= Shine (Boney James album) =

Studio album by Boney James
- Released: September 26, 2006
- Genre: Smooth jazz, contemporary jazz, crossover jazz
- Length: 50:39
- Label: Concord
- Producer: Boney James

Boney James chronology
Pure (2004)	Shine (2006)	Christmas Present (2007)

Professional ratings
Review scores
Source	Rating
AllMusic	3.5/5 stars

Shine is the tenth album by jazz saxophonist Boney James, released in 2006, and his first for Concord Records.

== Track listing ==
No.	Title	Writer(s)	Length
1.	"Shine" (featuring Esthero)	Boney James; Lauren Evans; Lily Mariye	4:22
2.	"The Total Experience" (featuring George Duke)	Boney James; Johnny Britt	3:59
3.	"Aquas de Março (Waters of March)"	Antonio Carlos Jobim	4:00
4.	"Let It Go"	Boney James; Rex Rideout	4:00
5.	"In the Rain" (featuring Dwele)	Anthony Hestor	5:00
6.	"Gonna Get It" (featuring Faith Evans)	Boney James; Rahsaan Patterson	3:55
7.	"Breathe"	Boney James; Phil Davis	3:59
8.	"Love Song" (featuring Philip Bailey)	Boney James; Eric Daniels; Johnny Britt	4:50
9.	"Hypnotic" (featuring George Benson)	Boney James	4:13
10.	"The Way She Walks"	Boney James; Leon Bisquera	4:01
11.	"Dedication"	Boney James; Gerald McCauley; Joe Wolfe	4:44
12.	"Soft" (featuring Ann Nesby)	Chuck Mangione	3:36
Total length:			50:39

== Personnel ==
- Boney James – arrangements (1–11), keyboards (1, 3, 4, 6, 7, 10, 12), tenor saxophone (2, 3, 5, 6, 9, 10), horn arrangements (2), soprano saxophone (3, 8, 11, 12), alto saxophone (4, 6, 7), flute (7)
- Darrell Smith – keyboards (1, 3, 8), acoustic piano (3), Rhodes piano (8), Wurlitzer electric piano (9)
- Eric Daniels – acoustic piano (8)
- Johnny Britt – acoustic piano (2), arrangements (2)
- George Duke – Rhodes piano (2)
- Rex Rideout – acoustic piano (4), Rhodes piano (4), keyboards (4)
- Tim Carmon – keyboards (5, 7, 10), arrangements (5), Rhodes piano (6, 11), organ (6), acoustic piano (7, 9)
- Gerald McCauley – Moog synthesizer (11), arrangements (11)
- Herman Jackson – Rhodes piano (12)
- Paul Jackson Jr. – guitars (1), acoustic guitar (2)
- Tony Maiden – electric guitar (2, 10, 11), guitars (7)
- Kleber Jorge – acoustic guitar (3), vocals (3)
- Michael Thompson – guitars (4)
- Agape – guitars (5)
- Dean Parks – guitars (6), acoustic guitar (10, 11)
- Wah Wah Watson – guitars (7), rhythm guitar (9)
- George Benson – lead guitar (9)
- Alex Al – bass (2–4, 6–9, 11)
- Teddy Campbell – drums (1)
- Lil' John Roberts – drums (2–4, 6–11)
- Lenny Castro – percussion (2–4, 6–12)
- Dan Higgins – saxophones (2, 9), flute (9)
- Bill Reichenbach Jr. – trombone (2, 9)
- Jerry Hey – trumpet (2), flugelhorn (2, 9), horn arrangements (2)
- Christian Scott – trumpet (10)
- Tollak Ollestad – harmonica (11)
- Romeo – vocal arrangements (5)
- Esthero – lead and backing vocals (1)
- Lauren Evans – backing vocals (1, 11), ooh vocals (5)
- Dwele – vocals (5), vocal arrangements (5)
- Faith Evans – vocals (6)
- Philip Bailey – vocals (8)
- Ann Nesby – vocals (12)

String section (Tracks 2, 8, 9 & 11)

- Boney James – arrangements
- Jerry Hey – arrangements
- Darrell Smith – arrangements (8, 11)
- Stephen Erdody, Trevor Handy, Paula Hochhalter and Tina Soule – cello
- Sam Formicola, Carrie Holzman-Little, Roland Kato and Victoria Miskolczy – viola
- Jackie Brand, Bruce Dukov, Julie Gigante, Henry Gronnier, Alan Grunfeld, Natalie Leggett, Ralph Morrison, Alyssa Park, Katia Popov, Tereza Stanislav, Sarah Thornblade and Margaret Wooten – violin

== Production ==
- Boney James – producer, recording
- Todd Fairall – recording
- Darius Fong – recording, second engineer
- Dave Rideau – recording
- Bill Schnee – recording, mixing (2, 3, 4, 7–12)
- Michael Thompson – recording
- John Adams – second engineer
- Jeff Harris – second engineer
- Jimmy Hoyson – second engineer
- Ryan Kennedy – second engineer
- Mark McLaughlin – second engineer
- Philip Ramos – second engineer
- Eric Rennaker – second engineer
- Assen Stoyanov – second engineer
- Erich Talaba – second engineer
- Aaron Walk – second engineer
- John Wroble – second engineer
- Koji Egawa – Pro Tools consultant
- Serban Ghenea – mixing (1, 5, 6)
- Robert Hadley – mastering
- Lexy Shroyer – production coordinator
- Glenn Barry – art production
- Andy Engel – design
- Don Miller – photography
- Direct Management Group, Inc. – management

Studios

- Recorded at The Backyard, Record Plant and Westlake Studios (Los Angeles, California); Capitol Studios and Sunset Sound (Hollywood, California); Schnee Studios (North Hollywood, California); Cocoa Butt Studios (Culver City, California); Porcupine Studios (Chandler, Arizona); Studio A (Dearborn Heights, Michigan).
- Mixed at MixStar Studios (Virginia Beach, Virginia) and Schnee Studios (North Hollywood, California).
- Mastered at The Mastering Lab (Hollywood, California).
