= Contact (Boney James album) =

Studio album by Boney James
- Released: March 29, 2011
- Recorded: 2010
- Genre: Smooth jazz
- Length: 48:15
- Label: Verve
- Producer: Boney James

Boney James chronology
Send One Your Love (2009)	Contact (2011)	The Beat (2013)

Contact is the thirteenth studio album by jazz saxophonist Boney James, released in 2011.

== Background and recording ==
James was part way through the recording of the album in 2010 when he was rear-ended by a drunk driver while sitting in traffic, suffering a fractured jaw, facial cuts, and losing two teeth. He was unable to play sax for six weeks as a result, and used this time to focus on writing for the album.

Of the album's title, James stated "Some of these songs had more of an energy even as I was starting, which is the first reason why I called it Contact. I thought of an airplane propeller being spun around."

The album features vocals from LeToya Luckett (on "When I Had the Chance"), Mario (on "That Look on Your Face"), Heather Headley (on "I'm Waiting"), and Donell Jones (on "Close to You"). It also features Dean Parks on guitar, and Mark Stephens on piano.

Two singles were taken from the album, "Contact" and "When I Had the Chance".

== Reception and chart performance ==
Contact received positive reviews from JazzTimes and Allmusic (Thom Jurek calling it "a bright spot in James' catalog").

The album reached no. 1 on the Billboard Jazz Albums chart, and no. 53 on the Billboard 200.

Contact was nominated for Best Contemporary Jazz Album at the Soul Train Awards.

== Track listing ==
No.	Title	Writer(s)	Length
1.	"Contact"	Boney James, Johnny Britt	3:51
2.	"Close to You"	James, Tim Carmon, Rex Rideout	4:15
3.	"Spin"	James, Carmon	4:20
4.	"When I Had the Chance"	James, Carmon, Lily Mariye	4:06
5.	"Cry"	James, Mark Stephens	4:09
6.	"That Look on Your Face"	James, Jon B.	4:48
7.	"Deep Time"	James, Britt, Freddie Washington	4:57
8.	"I'm Waiting"	James, Carmon, Mariye, Rideout	4:13
9.	"There and Back"	James, Stephens	5:10
10.	"Everything Matters"	James, Leon Bisquera	5:00
