= Send One Your Love (album) =

Studio album by Boney James
- Released: February 3, 2009
- Genre: Smooth jazz
- Length: 48:15
- Label: Concord
- Producer: Boney James

Boney James chronology
Christmas Present (2007)	Send One Your Love (2009)	Contact (2011)

Singles from Send One Your Love
- 1. "Don't Let Me Be Lonely Tonight" Released: 2009

Send One Your Love is the twelfth studio album by jazz saxophonist Boney James, released in 2009.

The cover of James Taylor's "Don't Let Me Be Lonely Tonight", featuring guest vocalist Quinn, was the only non-instrumental track on the album. It was released as a single, and was nominated for the Grammy Award for Best Traditional R&B Performance in 2010.

== Track listing ==
No.	Title	Writer(s)	Length
1.	"Wanna Show U Sumthin'"	Boney James	5:25
2.	"Send One Your Love"	Stevie Wonder	4:35
3.	"Stop, Look, Listen (To Your Heart)"	Thom Bell and Linda Creed	4:57
4.	"Touch"	John Klemmer	3:47
5.	"Don't Let Me Be Lonely Tonight"	James Taylor	4:17
6.	"Hold On Tight"	Boney James	5:05
7.	"I'm Gonna Love You Just a Little More Baby"	Barry White	4:30
8.	"City of Light"	Boney James and Tim Carmon	5:24
9.	"Butter"	Boney James	5:05
10.	"I'll Be Good to You"	The Brothers Johnson and Sonora Sam	5:10

== Personnel ==
- Boney James – arrangements, tenor saxophone (1, 3–6, 9, 10), soprano saxophone (2), keyboards (4, 9), programming (4, 5, 6), alto saxophone (7, 8)
- Tim Carmon – keyboards (1–8, 10), arrangements (2, 7, 10), keyboard bass (5, 7, 10)
- Mark Ellis Stephens – keyboards (9), keyboard bass (9)
- Dean Parks – guitars (2, 4, 8)
- Rob Bacon – guitars (3, 5, 10)
- Agape – guitars (6)
- Alex Al – bass (1–4, 6, 8)
- Lil' John Roberts – drums (1, 2, 8), cymbals (4)
- Teddy Campbell – drums (3, 7, 9, 10), cymbals (6)
- Lenny Castro – percussion (1–4, 6–10)
- Stefan Harris – vibraphone (8)
- Sue Ann Carwell – vocals (1)
- Kimberly Brewer – vocals (2, 10)
- Lynne Fiddmont – vocals (2, 10)
- Kenya Hathaway – vocals (2, 10)
- Lamont Van Hook – vocals (3, 10)
- Lily Mariye – touch (4)
- Quinn – vocals (5)

String section (Tracks 2, 6, 7 & 8)

- Jerry Hey – arrangements
- Ralph Morrison – concertmaster
- Stephen Erdody, Paula Hochhalter, Christina Soule and Cecilia Tsan – cello
- Marlow Fisher, Roland Kato, Shawn Mann and Victoria Miskolczy – viola
- Nina Evluhov, Julie Gigante, Henry Gronnier, Alan Grunfeld, Tamara Hatwan, Aimee Kreston, Ralph Morrison, Sara Parkins, Katia Popov, Tereza Stanislav, Sarah Thornblade and Josefina Vergara – violin

== Production ==
- Boney James – producer, recording
- Isaiah Abolin – recording
- Dave Rideau – recording
- Bill Schnee – recording, mixing
- Cliff Allen – assistant engineer
- Darius Fong – assistant engineer
- Steve Genewick – assistant engineer
- Eric Rennaker – assistant engineer
- Paul Smith – assistant engineer
- Sangwook "Sunny" Nam – mastering
- Lexy Shroyer – production coordinator
- Gravillias, Inc. – art direction, design
- Harper Smith – photography
- Annie Wolfson – grooming
- Melissa Orndorff – stylist
- Direct Management Group, Inc. – management

Studios

- Recorded at The Backyard and Westlake Studios (Los Angeles, California); Capitol Studios and Sunset Sound (Hollywood, California); Schnee Studios (North Hollywood, California); Legacy Recording Studios (New York City, New York).
- Mixed at Schnee Studios
- Mastered at The Mastering Lab (Ojai, California).
