= Be My Girl =

Be My Girl may refer to:

- Be My Girl (Jim Dale song), 1957: written by Artie Singer; produced by George Martin; with instrumental accompaniment and directed by Ron Goodwin
- "Be My Girl" (The Dramatics song), 1976
- "Be My Girl - Sally", a 1978 song by English rock band The Police
- "Be My Girl" (New Kids on the Block song), 1986
- "Be My Girl" (Eamon song), 2017
