= Kermit Quinn =

American singer

- Also known as: Quinn
- Origin: Atlanta, Georgia, U.S.
- Genres: R&B
- Occupation: Singer
- Formerly of: Intro, Blackstreet

Kermit Quinn, who also performs as Quinn, is an American R&B singer. He has been a member of the vocal groups Intro and Blackstreet. He is a native of Atlanta, Georgia.

His song "Let Me Do Me" was featured in the 2005 film Beauty Shop.

Quinn sang on saxophonist Boney James's cover of James Taylor's "Don't Let Me Be Lonely Tonight", on the 2009 album Send One Your Love.

He is currently the lead singer of the cover band JukeBox.

== Awards and nominations ==
Quinn and Boney James were nominated for the Grammy Award for Best Traditional R&B Performance for "Don't Let Me Be Lonely Tonight"; they lost to Beyoncé's cover of "At Last".

== Personal life ==
In 2011, Quinn dated The Real Housewives of Atlanta cast member Sheree Whitfield.
