= In the Rain (song) =

1972 single by The Dramatics

Single by The Dramatics

from the album Whatcha See Is Whatcha Get
- B-side: "(Gimme Some) Good Soul Music"
- Released: February 1972
- Genre: Soul
- Length: 5:08; 3:15 (edit)
- Label: Volt/Stax
- Songwriter: Tony Hester
- Producer: Tony Hester

The Dramatics singles chronology
"Get Up and Get Down" (1971)	"In the Rain" (1972)	"Toast to the Fool" (1972)

"In the Rain" is a 1972 soul single by American vocal group The Dramatics, from their first album, Whatcha See Is Whatcha Get. It was written by Tony Hester and released in February 1972. The track is notable for its use of sounds of rain and thunder, first heard before the song's introduction, then throughout the instrumental and chorus sections. The rhythm charts, strings and horns were arranged by Johnny Allen. The tracks were recorded at United Sound Recording Studio in Detroit, Michigan.

== Chart performance ==
"In the Rain" reached No. 5 on the Billboard Hot 100 singles chart and spent four weeks at No. 1 on the Best Selling Soul Singles chart. It sold over one million copies and is the group's biggest hit. Billboard ranked it as the No. 53 song for 1972.

== Song background ==
The song's lyrics state that, because of a broken love relationship, the singer wants to go out and stand in the rain so that no one can see him cry.

"Once the rain starts falling on my face,
You won't see a single trace,
Of the tears I'm crying,
Because of you I'm crying.
Don't want you to see me cry.
Let me go, Let me go
Let me go!"

== Chart positions ==
Chart (1972)	Peak position
U.S. Billboard Hot 100	5
U.S. Billboard Best Selling Soul Singles	1
Canada (RPM)	31

== Cover versions ==
- Keith Sweat, on his 1987 album Make It Last Forever
- The R&B group Xscape, in 1997, from the soundtrack of Love Jones
- The smooth jazz artist Boney James, featuring Dwele, for his 2006 album Shine
- Soul reggae version by the legendary Ernest Ranglin from his 1983 album From Kingston JA To Miami USA

== Sampling ==
The song has been sampled by many hip hop artists such as Wu-Tang Clan, Jadakiss, Big L, and Lil Wayne. As of 2022, music data website WhoSampled lists that it has been used in sampling over 90 times.

== See also ==
- List of number-one R&B singles of 1972 (U.S.)
