= Christmas Present (Boney James album) =

Studio album by Boney James
- Released: September 18, 2007
- Genre: Smooth jazz
- Length: 43:01
- Label: Concord
- Producer: Boney James

Boney James chronology
Shine (2006)	Christmas Present (2007)	Send One Your Love (2009)

Professional ratings
Review scores
Source	Rating
AllMusic	3/5 stars

Christmas Present is the second Christmas album and eleventh studio album by jazz saxophonist Boney James, released in 2007.

== Track listing ==
No.	Title	Writer(s)	Length
1.	"Skating"	Vince Guaraldi	3:36
2.	"Santa Baby" (featuring Chanté Moore)		4:38
3.	"O Tannenbaum"		4:09
4.	"River"		4:06
5.	"The First Noel" (featuring Rick Braun)		4:41
6.	"Merry Christmas Baby" (featuring Angie Stone)		4:28
7.	"My Grown Up Christmas List"		4:44
8.	"Hark! The Herald Angels Sing"		3:31
9.	"Silent Night" (featuring Anthony Hamilton)		5:16
10.	"Auld Lang Syne"		3:52

== Personnel ==
- Boney James – arrangements (1, 2, 3, 5–10), soprano saxophone (1, 4, 8), keyboards (2, 5, 8, 10), tenor saxophone (2, 3, 5, 6, 7, 9, 10)
- Phil Davis – keyboards (1), arrangements (1, 3), Rhodes piano (3)
- Darrell Smith – keyboards (2), arrangements (2)
- Eric Daniels – additional Rhodes piano (3), keyboards (6, 7), arrangements (6, 7), Rhodes piano (8)
- Tim Carmon – clavinet (3), organ (3), acoustic piano (4), keyboards (4, 5, 9), arrangements (5, 9)
- Paul Jackson Jr. – acoustic guitar (3), guitar solo (3), guitars (5)
- Tony Maiden – electric guitar (3), guitars (6)
- Dean Parks – guitars (7), acoustic guitar (8, 10)
- Alex Al – bass (1–6, 8, 10)
- Dave Weckl – drums (1), brushes (8)
- Teddy Campbell – drums (3, 5–8, 10)
- Lenny Castro – percussion
- Rick Braun – flugelhorn (5)
- Chanté Moore – vocals (2)
- Angie Stone – vocals (6)
- Anthony Hamilton – vocals (9)
