= The Beat (Boney James album) =

Studio album by Boney James
- Released: April 9, 2013
- Genre: Jazz, R&B
- Length: 42:03
- Label: Concord Records

Boney James chronology
| Contact (2011) | The Beat (2013) |

The Beat is the 14th studio album by Boney James released on April 9, 2013. At the 56th Annual Grammy Awards (held on January 26, 2014), The Beat lost out to Steppin' Out performed by Herb Alpert in the Best Pop Instrumental Album category.

== Track listing ==
1. "Don't You Worry 'Bout a Thing" (Stevie Wonder) - 4:56
2. "Sunset Boulevard" (Boney James, Brandon Coleman) - 4:07
3. "Missing You" (James, Abi Mancha, Jairus Mozee) - 3:37
4. "Batucada (The Beat)" (Marcos Valle, Paulo Sérgio Valle) - 4:03: featuring Rick Braun
5. "Maker of Love" (James, Phil Davis, Raheem Devaughn) - 3:48: featuring Raheem Devaughn
6. "Mari's Song" (James) - 4:28
7. "Powerhouse" (James, Mark Stephens) - 4:00
8. "The Midas (This Is Why)" (James, Natalie Stewart, Nolan Weekes) - 4:03: featuring The Floacist
9. "Acalento (Lullaby)" (James, Stephens) - 4:04
10. "You Can Count on Me" (James) - 4:57

== Personnel ==
- Boney James – keyboards, alto saxophone, soprano saxophone, tenor saxophone, flute
- Brandon Coleman – keyboards (1, 2)
- Jairus Mozee – keyboards (3), programming (3), guitars (3)
- Tim Carmon – keyboards (4), keyboard bass (4), acoustic piano (6, 8)
- Phil Davis – keyboards (5), programming (5)
- Mark Stephens – keyboards (7, 9)
- Rob Bacon – guitars (2, 4, 7, 10)
- Dwayne "Smitty" Smith – bass (2, 10)
- Alex Al – bass (4, 6, 7, 9)
- Vinnie Colaiuta – drums (1, 9, 10)
- Omari Williams – drums (2, 4, 7)
- Lenny Castro – percussion
- Rick Braun – trumpet (4)
- Abi Mancha – vocals (3)
- Raheem Devaughn – vocals (5)
- The Floacist – vocals (8)

== Production ==
- Boney James – producer, recording
- Dave Rideau – recording, mixing
- Jamil "Face" Johnson – vocal recording (5)
- Nolan Weekes – vocal recording (8)
- Graham Hope – assistant engineer
- David Schwerkolt – assistant engineer
- Paul Blakemore – mastering
- Lexy Shroyer – production coordinator
- Gravillis, Inc. – package design
- Harper Smith – photography
- Barbara Rose Management – management

Studios

- Recorded at The Backyard (Los Angeles, California) and Sunset Sound (Hollywood, California).
- Vocals on Track 5 recorded at Phase Recording & Media (White Plains, Maryland).
- Vocals on Track 8 recorded at Free Sum Music Studio (London, UK).
- Mixed at Cane River Studios (Sherman Oaks, California).
- Mastered at CMG Mastering (Cleveland, Ohio).

== Awards ==
| Year | Award | Result |
|---|---|---|
| 2014 | 56th Annual Grammy Awards Best Pop Instrumental Album. | Nominated |

== Notes ==
Track 1 is a cover a song by Stevie Wonder from his 1973 album Innervisions.
