= I Can't Get Over You =

I Can't Get Over You may refer to:

- "I Can't Get Over You" (Brooks & Dunn song), 1998
- "I Can't Get Over You", a bonus track from the 1966 album Black Monk Time by The Monks, B-side of single "Cuckoo"
- "I Can't Get Over You", a song from the 1976 Dramatics album, Joy Ride
- "I Can't Get Over You", a song from the 1981 Gap Band album, Gap Band IV
- "I Can't Get Over You", a song from the 2006 Linda Ronstadt and Ann Savoy album, Adieu False Heart
- "I Can't Get Over You", a song by Shane Filan from the 2015 album Right Here
- "I Can't Get Over You (Getting over Me)", a 1983 song by Bandana (country band)
- "Ooh La La (I Can't Get Over You)", a 1990 song by American R&B trio Perfect Gentlemen

== See also ==
- "Can't Get Over You", a 1989 song by Maze
- "Can't Get Over You", a 1986 song by Shara Nelson
- "Can't Get Over You", a song by Joji from his 2018 album Ballads 1
- "Can't Get Over You", a song from the 2004 Groove Coverage album, 7 Years and 50 Days
