= Happy Home =

Happy Home may refer to:

- Happy Home Series, six-volume series of children's books written by Howard R. Garis between 1926 and 1927
- Happy Home (TV series), a 2016 South Korean television
- "Happy Home" (song), a 2014 single by Danish DJ Hedegaard
- "Happy Home", a song by Boney James from his 1994 album Backbone
- "Happy Home", a song by 2Pac from the album Until the End of Time
