= Pure (Boney James album) =

Studio album by Boney James
- Released: August 3, 2004
- Genre: Smooth jazz
- Length: 44:09
- Label: Warner Bros.
- Producer: Boney James, Greg Smith, Paul Brown, Gerald McCauley

Boney James chronology
Ride (2001)	Pure (2004)	Shine (2006)

Singles from Pure
- 1. "Stone Groove" Released: 2004; 2. "Here She Comes" Released: 2004; 3. "Better With Time" Released: 2005

Professional ratings
Review scores
Source	Rating
AllMusic	4/5 stars

Pure is the ninth album by jazz saxophonist Boney James, released in 2004.

== Track listing ==
No.	Title	Writer(s)	Length
1.	"Pure"	Boney James, Phil Davis	4:38
2.	"Better With Time" (featuring Bilal)	James, Phillip Jackson, Rex Rideout	5:26
3.	"2:01 A.M."	James, Greg Smith	5:04
4.	"Stone Groove" (featuring Joe Sample)	James, Darrell Smith	4:47
5.	"Appreciate" (featuring Debi Nova)	James	3:34
6.	"Here She Comes"	James, Leon Bisquera	4:14
7.	"Break of Dawn" (featuring Dwele)	James, Johnny Britt, Andwele Gardner	4:49
8.	"It's On"	James, Britt	3:29
9.	"Thinkin' 'bout Me" (Lauren Evans)	James	4:02
10.	"You Don't Have to Go Home"	James, Paul Brown, Gerald McCauley	4:06

== Personnel ==
- Boney James – keyboards (1, 3–8), programming (1, 5), tenor saxophone (1, 3–6, 8, 9), string arrangements (1), soprano saxophone (2, 7), drum programming (2), horn arrangements (3, 4, 6, 7, 9, 10), keyboard bass (5)
- Phil Davis – keyboards (1)
- Morris Pleasure – acoustic piano (1), keyboards (2), Fender Rhodes (9), clavinet (9)
- Rex Rideout – keyboards (2)
- Greg Smith – keyboards (3), arrangements (3)
- David Torkanowsky – Fender Rhodes (3, 4), acoustic piano (6), Wurlitzer organ (6)
- Joe Sample – acoustic piano (4)
- Darrell Smith – clavinet (4)
- Johnny Britt – keyboards (8)
- Tim Carmon – organ (9)
- Kurt "KC" Clayton – Digital Rhodes piano (10)
- Bobby Lyle – acoustic piano (10)
- Billy Preston – organ (10)
- Matt Richardson – source sounds (10)
- Dean Parks – acoustic guitar (1, 2, 6), electric guitar (1, 6)
- Rohn Lawrence – wah guitar (1), electric guitar (2), guitars (6, 9)
- Paul Jackson Jr. – guitars (3, 7)
- Tony Maiden – guitars (5)
- Erick Walls – guitars (8)
- Marlon McClain – guitars (10)
- Pino Palladino – bass (1), fuzz bass (9)
- Alex Al – bass (2, 4, 7, 8), "funk" bass (9)
- Larry Kimpel – bass (6)
- Ricardo Jordan – hi-hat overdubs (1), drums (6)
- Ahmir "?uestlove" Thompson – drums (2, 4, 9)
- Teddy Campbell – drums (8)
- Ricky Lawson – drums (10)
- Lenny Castro – percussion (1–4, 6, 9)
- Luis Conte – percussion (5, 7, 8, 10)
- Dan Higgins – tenor saxophone (3, 4, 6, 7, 9, 10)
- Bill Reichenbach Jr. – trombone (3, 4, 6, 7, 9, 10)
- Jerry Hey – string arrangements (1, 2), trumpet (3, 4, 6, 7, 9, 10), horn arrangements (3, 4, 6, 7, 9, 10)
- Cecilia Tsan – cello (1, 2)
- Roland Kato – viola (1, 2)
- Ralph Morrison – violin (1, 2)
- Sara Parkins – violin (1, 2)
- Bilal – vocals (2)
- Debi Nova – vocals (5)
- Dwele – vocals (7)
- Lauren Evans – vocals (9)

== Production ==
- Jeff Aldrich – A&R
- Boney James – producer, recording
- Greg Smith – additional producer (3)
- Paul Brown – producer (10)
- Gerald McCauley – producer (10)
- Ray Bardani – recording
- Russell Elevado – recording
- Todd Fairall – recording
- Dave Rideau – recording
- Rex Rideout – recording
- Bill Schnee – recording
- Koji Egawa – Pro Tools consultant
- Aaron Fessel – second engineer
- Jesse Gorman – second engineer
- Marc McLaughlin – second engineer
- Michael Musmanno – second engineer
- Ryan Petrie – second engineer, additional Pro Tools consultant
- Greg Price – second engineer, additional Pro Tools consultant
- Jason Rankins – second engineer
- Steef Van De Gevel – second engineer, additional Pro Tools consultant
- Antony Zeller – second engineer
- Dragan "DC" Capor – additional Pro Tools consultant
- John Hanes – additional Pro Tools consultant
- Steve Mazur – additional Pro Tools consultant
- Serban Ghenea – mixing
- Tim Roberts – mix assistant
- Chris Gehringer – mastering
- Lexy Shroyer – production coordinator
- Mick Haggerty – art direction
- James Minchin III – photography
- Direct Management Group, Inc. – management

Studios

- Recorded at The Backyard and Westlake Audio (Los Angeles, California); Schnee Studios (North Hollywood, California); KAR Studios (Sherman Oaks, California); Electric Lady Studios, The Hit Factory and Sear Sound (New York City, New York); Studio A Recording (Dearborn Heights, Michigan).
- Mixed at MixStar Studios (Virginia Beach, Virginia).
- Mastered at Sterling Sound (New York City, New York)
