= Body Language (Boney James album) =

Studio album by Boney James
- Released: February 23, 1999
- Recorded: 1998
- Genre: Smooth jazz
- Length: 42:14
- Label: Warner Bros.
- Producer: Boney James, Paul Brown

Boney James chronology
Sweet Thing (1997)	Body Language (1999)	Shake It Up (2000)

Singles from Sweet Thing
- 1. "Are You Ready?" Released: 1999; 2. "I Get Lonely" Released: 1999

Professional ratings
Review scores
Source	Rating
AllMusic	3/5 stars

Body Language is the sixth album by jazz saxophonist Boney James, released in 1999.

== Track listing ==
No.	Title	Writer(s)	Length
1.	"Are You Ready?"	James Oppenheim; Ronnie Garrett; Rex Rideout; Daryl Simmons	5:02
2.	"Into the Blue"	James Oppenheim; Leon Bisquera	4:33
3.	"Body Language"	James Oppenheim; Phil Davis; Paul Brown	4:55
4.	"I'll Always Love You"	James Oppenheim; Johnny Britt; Sean Thomas	4:26
5.	"Boneyizm (duet with Rick Braun)"	James Oppenheim; Paul Brown	4:27
6.	"Love Fest"	James Oppenheim; Leon Bisquera	4:45
7.	"Bedtime Story"	James Oppenheim; David Torkanowsky	4:25
8.	"I Get Lonely"	Janet Jackson; Rene Elizondo, Jr.; Terry Lewis; James Harris III	5:31
9.	"All Night Long"	James Oppenheim; Paul Brown; Mark Ellis Stephens; Donnell Spencer Jr.	4:10
Total length:			42:14

== Personnel ==
Musicians

- Boney James – soprano saxophone (1, 4, 6, 8), Yamaha WX7 (1, 3, 9), tenor saxophone (2, 3, 5, 8, 9), keyboards (2, 5–9), synth bass (5, 7), programming (5, 7), alto saxophone (7)
- Rex Rideout – keyboards (1), programming (1)
- David Torkanowsky – acoustic piano (2, 8), Fender Rhodes (6, 8), additional keyboards (7), acoustic piano solo (7), organ (8)
- Phil Davis – keyboards (3, 4), synth bass (3), programming (3, 4)
- Tim Heintz – additional keyboards (4, 8)
- Leon Bisquera – keyboards (6)
- Mark Ellis Stephens – keyboards (9)
- Paul Jackson Jr. – acoustic guitar (1), electric guitar (1), guitars (5)
- Rohn Lawrence – guitars (2), "right" guitars (3, 8)
- Tony Maiden – "left" guitars (3), guitars (9)
- Ronnie Garrett – bass (1)
- Alex Al – bass (2, 6, 9), synth bass (8)
- Larry Kimpel – bass (5)
- Lil' John Roberts – drums (2, 6, 9), additional drums (8)
- Donnell Spencer Jr. – drums (8), vocals (9)
- Paulinho da Costa – percussion (1, 2, 3, 6, 8)
- Lenny Castro – percussion (5, 7, 9)
- Rick Braun – flugelhorn (5)
- Chelle Davis – vocals (1)
- Shai – vocals (4)

Arrangements

- Boney James (1, 2, 5–9)
- Rex Rideout (1)
- Paul Brown (2, 6, 8, 9)
- Phil Davis (3, 4)
- Impromp2 (4)
- Mark Ellis Stephens (9)

String section (Tracks 2, 6 & 9)

- Jerry Hey – arrangements and conductor
- Ralph Morrison – concertmaster
- Stephen Erdody (principal), Christine Ermacoff, Paula Hochhalter, Armen Ksajikan, Christina Soule and Cecilia Tsan – cello
- Margot Aldcroft, Brian Dembow (principal), Thomas Diener, Jennie Hansen, Carrie Holzman-Little and Victoria Miskolczy – viola
- Richard Altenbach, Jackie Brand, Mario De Leon, Henry Gronnier, Lily Ho Chen, Karen Jones, Frances Moore, Ralph Morrison, Sara Parkins and Kenneth Yerke – violin

== Production ==
- Boney James – producer
- Paul Brown – producer, engineer
- Ronnie Garrett – co-producer (1)
- Martin Christensen – engineer
- Don Murray – engineer
- Bill Schnee – engineer, mixing
- Erik Zobler – engineer
- Koji Egawa – mix assistant
- Stephen Marcussen – mastering
- Lexy Shroyer – production coordinator
- Vigon/Ellis – art direction, design
- Robert Zuckerman – photography
- Diane Kranz – stylist
- Howard Lowell – management

Studios

- Recorded at Alpha Studios (Burbank, California); Funky Joint Studios and Heintz 57 Varieties Studio (Sherman Oaks, California); Sunset Sound (Hollywood, California); Schnee Studios (North Hollywood, California); Silent Partner Studios (Philadelphia, Pennsylvania).
- Mixed at Schnee Studios
- Mastered at Precision Mastering (Hollywood, California).

== Charts ==
=== Weekly charts ===
Chart (1999)	Peak position
US Billboard 200	91
US Top Jazz Albums (Billboard)	1
US Top R&B/Hip-Hop Albums (Billboard)	32

=== Year-end charts ===
Chart (1999)	Position
US Top R&B/Hip-Hop Albums (Billboard)	92
