= The Shangri-la Cafe =

The Shangri-la Cafe is a 2000 short film written and directed by Lily Mariye. The film is about a Japanese American family who conceal their heritage and reluctantly adopt discriminatory practices in order to operate a Chinese restaurant in Las Vegas in the late 1950s. The Los Angeles Times calls the film well-reviewed, and it won awards at festivals such as the Brussels Independent Film Festival and Nashville Independent Film Festival.

The director began working on the film in 1998, working with the American Film Institute's Directing Workshop for Women.

== Cast ==
- Montana Tsai as Annie Takashi
- Joanne Takahashi as Emiko Takashi
- Sam Anderson as The Man
- Christopher Chen as Tad Takashi
- Albert Chien as Jimmy Takashi
- Cedric Harris as Reverend Charles Osteen
- Montae Russell as George Brooks
- Margaret Laurena Kemp as Mildred Brooks
- Kelli Kirkland as Helen Osteen
- Charles 'Brick' Tilley Jr. as Man #2
- Bob Bergen as Television Announcer (voice)

== Reception ==
The Los Angeles Times calls the film well-reviewed, and it won awards at festivals such as the Brussels Independent Film Festival and Nashville Independent Film Festival. It was positively reviewed for its portrayal of 1950s racism by SFGate, which called it "unusually sensitive to the heightened experience of children." The Chicago Reader wrote that Mariye set "a preachy tone" in the film. Edward Guthmann from the San Francisco Chronicle, Jonathan Kaplan, and Lesli Linka Glatter praised Mariye's directing debut. The Hollywood Reporter's Michael Rechtshaffen described the film as a "tender, bittersweet childhood recollection of a not always glittering Las Vegas past."

== Awards ==
- Filmmaker of the Year (Lily Mariye), National Organization for Women
- Best Short Film Award, Moondance International Film Festival
- Best Screenplay Award, Brussels Independent Film Festival
- 2nd place, Best Short Film, Nashville Film Festival
- 2nd place, Best Short Film, Woodstock Film Festival

== Official selection ==
- BBC British Short Film in London, England
- Seattle International Film Festival
- Palm Springs International Festival of Short Films
- Hamptons International Film Festival
- American Cinematheque at Grauman's Egyptian Theatre, Hollywood, California
- Athens International
- Sepia Women of Color at the John F. Kennedy Center for the Performing Arts
- Big Bear
- Los Angeles Asian Pacific American Film and Video
- New York Asian American International
- San Francisco International Asian American Film Festival
- Women of Color in Berkeley, California
- Sedona Film Festival
- Shades of Power in San Francisco, California
- Chicago Asian American Showcase
- San Diego Asian Film Festival
- Slant in Houston, Texas
- University of Iowa
- Museum of Fine Arts, Boston
- Portobello Film Festival
- Woodstock Film Festival
- Blue Sky International Film in Las Vegas, Nevada
- Magnolia Festival
- Yale Women in Film Festival
