= Trust (Boney James album) =

Studio album by Boney James
- Released: 1992
- Genre: Smooth jazz
- Length: 42:53
- Label: Spindletop Records
- Producer: Paul Brown

Boney James chronology
Trust (1992)	Backbone (1994)

Professional ratings
Review scores
Source	Rating
AllMusic	3/5 stars

Trust is the debut album by American jazz saxophonist Boney James, released in 1992. The album was recorded and released on the independent label Spindletop Records. Followed by the album's success Boney James would sign up to Warner Bros. Records to record future albums.

== Track listing ==
1. "It's A Beautiful Thing" (Jeff Carruthers/Paul Brown/James Oppenheim) - 5:05
2. "Roadrunner" (James Oppenheim) - 4:14
3. "Lily" (James Oppenheim/Leon Bisquera) - 5:36
4. "Kyoto" (Jeff Carruthers/Paul Brown/James Oppenheim/Sam Sims/Mark Gregory) - 5:16
5. "Another Place, Another Time" (Jeff Carruther/Paul Brown/James Oppenheim) - 5:12
6. "Creepin'" (Stevie Wonder) - 3:39
7. "Personal Touch" (James Oppenheim/Paul Brown) - 4:34
8. "Trust" (Jeff Carruthers/Paul Brown/James Oppenheim/Mark Gregory) - 4:41
9. "Metropolis" (Jeff Carruthers/Paul Brown/James Oppenheim/Mark Gregory) - 4:36

== Personnel ==
- Boney James – tenor saxophone (1, 5, 9), all other instruments (1, 2, 4, 5, 6, 8, 9), keyboards (2, 3, 7), alto saxophone (2, 3, 8), arrangements (2, 3, 7), soprano saxophone (4, 6, 7), Yamaha WX7 (9)
- Leon Bisquera – keyboards (3)
- David Torkanowsky – acoustic piano (4), acoustic piano solo (5)
- Jeff Carruthers – arrangements (1, 4, 5, 6, 8, 9), keyboards (6)
- Allen Hinds – guitars (2, 3), guitar solo (2)
- Paul Jackson Jr. – guitars (4, 6, 8, 9)
- Marcos Loya – classical guitar (7)
- Roberto Vally – bass (3, 4, 7)
- Freddie Washington – bass (8)
- Carlos Vega – drums (3, 7)
- Lenny Castro – percussion (1–8)
- Oscar Brashear – trumpet (1)
- Tollak Ollestad – harmonica solo (4)

== Production ==
- W. Barry Wilson – executive producer
- Paul Brown – producer, recording, mixing
- Teresa Caffin – recording assistant
- Richard McIntosh – recording assistant
- Russell Burt – assistant engineer
- Stephen Marcussen – mastering
- Larry Vigon – art direction, design
- Brian Jackson – design
- Denise Milford – photography
- Howard Lowell – management

Studios

- Recorded at Studio Ultimo (Los Angeles, California); Alpha Studios (Burbank, California); Entourage Studios (North Hollywood, California).
- Mixed at Alpha Studios
- Mastered at Precision Mastering (Hollywood, California).
