= Whatcha See Is Whatcha Get (album) =

Studio album by The Dramatics
- Released: November 1971
- Genre: Soul
- Length: 30:10
- Label: Volt/Stax
- Producer: Tony Hester (exec.)

The Dramatics chronology
Whatcha See Is Whatcha Get (1971)	A Dramatic Experience (1973)

Singles from Whatcha See Is Whatcha Get
- 1. "Whatcha See Is Whatcha Get" Released: 1971; 2. "Get Up and Get Down" Released: 1972; 3. "In the Rain" Released: 1972

Alternative cover
- Artwork for 1978 vinyl and 1980s CD re-releases

Whatcha See Is Whatcha Get is the debut studio album by American R&B group The Dramatics, released in 1971 via Volt Records and Stax Records. It peaked at #20 on the Billboard 200 and #5 on the Billboard R&B chart.

Three singles were released from the album: "Whatcha See Is Whatcha Get", "Get Up and Get Down" and "In the Rain". "Thankful for Your Love" (originally appearing on the album as "Thank You for Your Love") was also issued as a promotional single. "In the Rain" was the most successful single from the album, peaking at #5 on the Billboard Hot 100 in 1972. "Get Up and Get Down" was featured in Dead Presidents.

== Critical reception ==
Professional ratings
Review scores
Source	Rating
AllMusic	4/5 stars
Christgau's Record Guide	B
The Rolling Stone Album Guide	3.5/5 stars
Q Magazine	4/5 stars

Reviewing in Christgau's Record Guide: Rock Albums of the Seventies (1981), Village Voice critic Robert Christgau wrote of the album: "Sounds like better Motown than recently and greasier Motown than ever, and it figures—this Tempts-styled Detroit quintet, with Ron Banks in the David Ruffin role, play for the Memphis Grease Kings. 'Get Up and Get Down' and 'Whatcha See Is Whatcha Get' resound with uptempo bottom, and while I find the big dramatic number, 'In the Rain,' a little too big and too dramatic, I do prefer Don Davis's sound effects to Norman Whitfield's. Better filler than Motown, too—but not that much better." Q Magazine described the album as "consistently impressive [with] 'Hot Pants In The Summertime' carrying a peculiar angst-ridden intensity".

== Track listing ==
All tracks are written by Tony Hester.

No.	Title	Length
1.	"Get Up and Get Down"	3:10
2.	"Thank You for Your Love"	4:25
3.	"Hot Pants in the Summertime"	3:57
4.	"Whatcha See Is Whatcha Get"	3:56
5.	"In the Rain"	5:08
6.	"Gimme Some (Good Soul Music)"	2:35
7.	"Fall in Love, Lady Love"	3:34
8.	"Mary Don't Cha Wanna"	3:25
Total length:		30:10

== Charts ==
=== Weekly charts ===
Chart (1971–1972)	Peak position
US Billboard 200	20
US Top R&B/Hip-Hop Albums (Billboard)	5

=== Year-end charts ===
Chart (1972)	Position
US Billboard 200	99
US Top R&B/Hip-Hop Albums (Billboard)	14
