= Ride (Boney James album) =

Studio album by Boney James
- Released: October 23, 2001
- Genre: Smooth jazz
- Length: 48:42
- Label: Warner Bros.
- Producer: Boney James, Paul Brown

Boney James chronology
Shake It Up (2000)	Ride (2001)	Pure (2004)

Singles from Ride
- 1. "RPM / Something Inside" Released: August 21, 2001; 2. "See What I'm Sayin'? / Ride" Released: November 13, 2001

Professional ratings
Review scores
Source	Rating
AllMusic	4/5 stars

Ride is the eighth studio album by jazz saxophonist Boney James, released on October 23, 2001 by Warner Bros. Records. The album spawned the smooth jazz radio singles "RPM" and "See What I'm Sayin'?" and the Urban AC radio singles "Something Inside" with R&B singer Dave Hollister and "Ride" with R&B singer Jaheim.

== Track listing ==
No.	Title	Writer(s)	Length
1.	"Heaven" (featuring Trina Broussard)	James Oppenheim, Johnny Britt	4:04
2.	"Grand Central"	Oppenheim, Britt	4:57
3.	"RPM"	Oppenheim, David Torkanowsky	4:48
4.	"Something Inside" (featuring Dave Hollister)	Sekou Aitken, Rex Rideout, Angie Stone, Phil Temple	3:53
5.	"So Beautiful"	Oppenheim, Rideout, Ronnie Garrett	4:21
6.	"See What I'm Sayin'?"	Oppenheim, Paul Brown, David "Kahlid" Woods	4:34
7.	"All About You"	Oppenheim, Brown, Sue Ann Carwell, Ian Prince	4:07
8.	"Ride" (featuring Jaheim)	Brown, Woods, Teron Beal	4:33
9.	"As You Are"	Oppenheim	4:30
10.	"This Is the Life"	Oppenheim, Carl Burnett	4:59
11.	"Boneyard" (Hidden Track)	Oppenheim, Brown, Chuck Cymone	3:56

== Personnel ==
Musicians

- Boney James – all instruments (1), programming (1, 3), keyboards (2, 3, 4, 6, 7, 9, 10, 11), tenor saxophone (2, 3, 5–8, 10), wind synthesizer (2), soprano saxophone (4, 9, 11), vocoder (8), synth acoustic guitar (9), drum programming (9)
- Rex Rideout – acoustic piano (2), Fender Rhodes (2), keyboards (4, 5), programming (4)
- David Torkanowsky – keyboards (3), Rhodes piano (9), acoustic piano (11)
- David "Kahlid" Woods – keyboards (6, 8), programming (6, 8), guitars (8), backing vocals (8)
- Ian Prince – keyboards (7), programming (7), vocals (7)
- Carl Burnett – keyboards (10), programming (10)
- Leon Bisquera – additional keyboards (10)
- Chuck Cymone – programming (11), acoustic guitar (11)
- Paul Jackson Jr. – guitars (2, 5), acoustic guitar (9)
- Paul Brown – wah wah guitar (2), drum programming (9)
- Rohn Lawrence – guitars (3, 6), "uh-huh" voice (6)
- Charlie Singleton – guitars (7)
- Alex Al – bass (2, 5)
- Marcus Miller – bass (6)
- Larry Kimpel – bass (9)
- Ahmir "?uestlove" Thompson – drums (2, 5)
- Paulinho da Costa – percussion (2, 5, 6, 10)
- Lenny Castro – percussion (3, 7, 9)
- Andy Narell – steel drums (10)
- Luis Conte – percussion (11)
- Dan Higgins – tenor saxophone (2, 10), flute (2, 10), alto flute (5)
- Bill Reichenbach Jr. – trombone (2, 10), bass trumpet (5)
- Jerry Hey – trumpet (2, 10), flugelhorn (2, 5)
- Trina Broussard – lead and backing vocals (1)
- Johnny Britt – backing vocals (1)
- Dave Hollister – lead vocals (4)
- Caleb Simms – backing vocals (4)
- Carl Carwell – vocals (7)
- Sue Ann Carwell – vocals (7)
- Jaheim – lead vocals (8)

Arrangements

- Boney James (1–5, 9, 11)
- Jerry Hey – horn arrangements (2, 5, 10)
- Paul Brown (4, 6, 8, 9, 11)
- Rex Rideout (4, 5)
- Ronnie Garrett (5)
- David "Kahlid" Woods (6)
- Ian Prince (7)
- Teron Beal (8)
- David Torkanowsky (9)
- Carl Burnett (10)
- Chuck Cymone (11)

== Production ==
- Boney James – producer
- Paul Brown – producer, recording
- Ian Prince – additional producer (7)
- Russell Elevado – recording, mixing
- Don Murray – recording
- Andy Ackland – mix assistant
- Shinobu Mitsuoka – mix assistant
- Martin Christensen – Pro Tools engineer
- Koji Egawa – Pro Tools engineer
- Chris Gehringer – mastering
- Lexy Shroyer – production coordinator
- Glenn Barry – design production
- Andy Engel – art direction, design
- Eric Heintz – digital rendering
- Don Miller – photography
- Direct Management Group, Inc. – management

Studios

- Recorded at Electric Lady Studios (New York City, New York); Funky Joint Studios (Sherman Oaks, California); O'Henry Sound Studios and Alpha Studios (Burbank, California); Sunset Sound (Hollywood, California).
- Pro Tools recording at Schnee Studios (North Hollywood, California) and 57 Varieties Studio (Sherman Oaks, California).
- Mixed at Electric Lady Studios and O'Henry Sound Studios.
- Mastered at Sterling Sound (New York City, New York).
