= Detroit (film) =

2017 film by Kathryn Bigelow

- Theatrical release poster
- Directed by: Kathryn Bigelow
- Written by: Mark Boal
- Produced by: Megan Ellison; Kathryn Bigelow; Mark Boal; Matthew Budman; Colin Wilson; Greg Shapiro
- Starring: John Boyega; Will Poulter; Algee Smith; Jason Mitchell; John Krasinski; Anthony Mackie
- Cinematography: Barry Ackroyd
- Edited by: William Goldenberg; Harry Yoon
- Music by: James Newton Howard
- Production companies: Annapurna Pictures; First Light; Page 1
- Distributed by: Annapurna Pictures
- Release dates: July 25, 2017 (Fox Theatre); July 28, 2017 (United States)
- Running time: 153 minutes
- Country: United States
- Language: English
- Budget: $34 million
- Box office: $26 million

Detroit is a 2017 American historical crime drama film directed by Kathryn Bigelow and written by Mark Boal. It stars John Boyega, Will Poulter, Algee Smith, Jason Mitchell, John Krasinski, and Anthony Mackie. Based on the Algiers Motel incident during Detroit's 1967 12th Street Riot, the film's release commemorated the 50th anniversary of the event.

The film premiered at Detroit's Fox Theatre on July 25, 2017, and began a limited theatrical release on July 28, before opening wide on August 4 by Annapurna Pictures. It received positive reviews from critics, with particular praise given to Bigelow's direction, Boal's script, and the performances of Poulter, Boyega, and Smith, but was a box office failure, only grossing $26 million against its $34 million budget.

== Plot ==
On July 23, 1967, the Detroit Police Department stage a raid on an unlicensed club during a celebration for some African American veterans returning from the Vietnam War. While suspects are being arrested, a mob forms and begins throwing rocks at the officers before looting nearby stores and starting fires, beginning the 12th Street Riot. With local authorities, elected representatives, and emergency services unable to maintain order, Governor George W. Romney authorizes the National Guard and President Lyndon B. Johnson authorizes Army paratroopers to enter Detroit to provide assistance. On the second day of rioting, officers Krauss and Flynn pursue a fleeing looter, and Krauss kills the man with a shotgun against orders, but is allowed to remain on duty while his superiors debate filing murder charges.

Seconds before The Dramatics, a black R&B vocal group, take the stage for a performance that they hope will lead to a recording contract with Motown, the police shut down the venue due to rioting outside. The bus the group gets on is attacked by rioters, and, in the ensuing chaos, they get split up. Larry, the lead singer, and his friend, Fred, rent a room in the nearby Algiers Motel—in a detached annex building—to get off the streets. They meet two young white women, Julie and Karen, who introduce them to Carl, Lee, Aubrey, and Michael. Carl and Lee stage a prank using a starter pistol, upsetting Julie and Karen, who go to the room of Greene, a Vietnam War veteran, while Larry and Fred return to their own room.

Melvin Dismukes, a private security guard, is at a grocery store near the Algiers to protect it from rioters. Some guardsmen pull up outside, and Carl decides to fire several blanks at the troops to frighten them. The shots are mistaken for a sniper attack, and members of the National Guard and the state and local police descend upon the Algiers annex to investigate. Krauss guns down a fleeing Carl immediately upon entering the building and plants a knife next to the body.

The task force lines up everyone they find in the annex against the wall, demanding to know who the sniper was. No weapon is found, but Krauss begins to terrorize and beat the suspects while interrogating them. Dismukes arrives and, although he does not like what he sees, does not challenge Krauss openly. As the situation spirals out of control, most of the state police and national guardsmen leave to avoid being associated with it, but no one intervenes or reports the abuse.

One by one, Krauss orders several suspects to be moved to different rooms and subjected to mock executions in order to terrify the others into confessing. Julie and Karen are taken to an upstairs room when Karen begins screaming, and Julie's clothes get torn off. Disgusted, one of the remaining Guardsman gets them released from custody. Not understanding the executions were supposed to be faked, officer Demens actually kills Aubrey, and a worried Krauss offers to let the remaining suspects leave if they swear to keep silent. Greene and Larry agree and are let go, but Fred refuses and is killed.

As the riots die down, Dismukes is brought to the police station, where he is shocked to find himself a suspect in the investigation into the deaths. Krauss, Flynn, and Demens are also implicated after Demens and Flynn make a compromising statement.

Two years later, at the trial, the testimony of the survivors of the incident is picked apart by the defense attorney. When the judge finds the officers' statements to be inadmissible because they were not properly advised of their Miranda rights, the prosecution's case falls apart. The all-white jury acquits the defendants.

Larry rethinks his singing career due to the trauma he experienced, and watches as his former bandmates achieve success without him. Living in squalor, he ultimately gets a job as choir director at a small church.

Closing text reveals that Dismukes subsequently moved to the suburbs to escape death threats and resumed work as a security guard, the police officers never returned to active duty, and the families of some of the victims had limited success with civil lawsuits.

== Cast ==
- John Boyega as Melvin Dismukes, a part-time security guard
- Will Poulter as Philip Krauss (based on David Senak), a Detroit police officer
- Algee Smith as Larry Reed, a member of The Dramatics
- Jacob Latimore as Fred Temple, The Dramatics' valet
- Jason Mitchell as Carl Cooper
- Hannah Murray as Julie Ann Hysell
- Kaitlyn Dever as Karen Malloy
- Jack Reynor as Demens (based on Ronald August), a Detroit police officer
- Ben O'Toole as Flynn (based on Robert Paille), a Detroit police officer
- Nathan Davis Jr. as Aubrey Pollard
- Peyton Alex Smith as Lee Forsythe
- Malcolm David Kelley as Michael Clark
- Joseph David-Jones as Morris, a member of The Dramatics
- Laz Alonso as Congressman Conyers
- Ephraim Sykes as Jimmy, a member of The Dramatics
- Leon Thomas III as Darryl, a member of The Dramatics
- Gbenga Akinnagbe as Aubrey Pollard Sr.
- Chris Chalk as Officer Frank, who leads the blind pig raid
- Jeremy Strong as Prosecuting Attorney Lang
- Austin Hébert as Warrant Officer Roberts of the Michigan Army National Guard
- Miguel Pimentel as Malcolm, Larry's replacement in The Dramatics
- Khris Davis as Blind Pig Patron
- John Krasinski as Defense Attorney Auerbach (based on Norman Lippitt)
- Anthony Mackie as Karl Greene (based on Robert Lee Greene)
- Mason Alban as Police Sergeant James, who is present at the blind pig raid
- Amari Cheatom as Undercover Cop at the blind pig
- Tyler James Williams as Leon, who is present at the blind pig raid and the start of the riot
- Dennis Staroselsky as Detective Jones
- Darren Goldstein as Detective Tanchuck
- Jonny P. as Announcer for the Swingin' Time Revue
- Samira Wiley as Vanessa, an employee at the Algiers Motel
- Devin Clark as Kid on Street helped by Dismukes
- Ricardo Pitts-Wiley as Spencer, Dismukes' coworker
- Bates Wilder as Michigan State Police Sergeant
- Kris Sidberry as Roberta Pollard, Aubrey's mother
- Lizan Mitchell as Ma Pollard, Aubrey's grandmother
- Chris Coy as Detective Thomas
- Glenn Fitzgerald as Homicide Detective Anderson
- Frank Wood as Judge Demascio
- Jennifer Ehle as Morgue Doctor (uncredited)

== Production ==
=== Development and casting ===
On January 28, 2016, it was announced that Kathryn Bigelow and Mark Boal would reteam to make a film about the 1967 Detroit riot, with Bigelow directing from a script by Boal. Both would also produce the film, along with Annapurna Pictures' Megan Ellison and Matthew Budman. Game of Thrones actress Hannah Murray was cast in a "key role" in the film, although the character she would play was initially kept under wraps. The film was scheduled to shoot in the summer of 2016, in order to be released in 2017—the 50th anniversary of the riot. John Boyega joined the cast on June 21, 2016; Will Poulter, Jack Reynor, and Ben O'Toole on August 3; Anthony Mackie on August 4; and Jacob Latimore and Algee Smith on August 5; Joseph David-Jones on August 8; Kaitlyn Dever on August 30; Jason Mitchell on September 9; and John Krasinski on September 13. In October, Jeremy Strong, Chris Chalk, Austin Hébert, Ephraim Sykes, Laz Alonso, Nathan Davis Jr., Malcolm David Kelley, Peyton Alex Smith, and Leon Thomas III all joined the cast of the film.

=== Filming ===
It was reported at the end of July 2016 that the film had commenced principal photography in Boston during the previous week. Scenes were filmed inside Dedham District Court, as well as at other locations in Dorchester and Brockton, Massachusetts. In addition, the movie filmed in Detroit during October 2016. The elimination of Michigan's film incentives in 2015 affected the filming locations that were used.

=== Post-production ===
In May 2017, James Newton Howard was hired as the film's composer. Detroit rapper Tee Grizzley released a song called "Teetroit" in July. The Roots and Bilal recorded a song titled "It Ain't Fair", which plays during the film's end credits.

== Release ==
The film began a limited release in 10 markets on July 28, 2017, opening in New York City, Los Angeles, Chicago, Dallas, Washington, D.C., Detroit, San Francisco, Houston, Atlanta, and Baltimore. Annapurna Pictures then released the film nationally, its first as a distributor, on August 4. While Annapurna handled the film's North American distribution, Metro-Goldwyn-Mayer and Entertainment One handled distribution for its international release. On November 3, 2017, it was announced the film would get a 10 city, 20 screen re-release on December 1, in an effort to assist its award campaign.

== Reception ==
=== Box office ===
Detroit grossed $16.8 million in the United States and Canada and $9.2 million in other territories, for a worldwide total of $26 million, against a production budget of $34 million.

In North America, the film grossed $350,190 its limited-opening weekend from 20 theaters (an average of $17,510), finishing 16th at the box office. It had its wide expansion alongside Kidnap and The Dark Tower, and was initially projected to gross $10–15 million from 3,007 theaters over the weekend. After making $525,000 (more than the $515,482 it made its entire week of limited release) from Thursday previews, the film made $2.6 million on its first day, and the projection for its wide-opening weekend gross was lowered to $7.5 million. The film went on to open to $7.1 million, finishing 8th at the box office. 40% of its opening weekend audience were African American. Deadline Hollywood said the film could have done better if it had been released in the fall, during festivals and awards season. Its second weekend of wide release, the film grossed $2.9 million, dropping 59.5% (above average for an adult drama) and finishing in 13th. The following week, the film was pulled from 1,579 theaters and grossed $850,000 (a drop of 70.9%).

=== Critical response ===
The film received praise for its direction, script, and performances, especially those of Poulter, Boyega, and Smith. On review aggregator website Rotten Tomatoes, it has an approval rating of 82% based on 301 reviews, with an average score of 7.6/10; the site's "critics consensus" reads: "Detroit delivers a gut-wrenching – and essential – dramatisation of a tragic chapter from America's past that draws distressing parallels to the present." On Metacritic, the film has a weighted average score of 77 out of 100, based on 49 critics, indicating "generally favorable reviews". Audiences polled by CinemaScore gave the film an average grade of "A−" on an A+ to F scale, while PostTrak reported filmgoers gave it an 86% overall positive score and a 63% "definite recommend".

Richard Roeper of Chicago Sun-Times gave the film 4 out of 4 stars and called it one of 2017's best, saying: "Journalist-screenwriter Mark Boal (Bigelow's collaborator on The Hurt Locker and Zero Dark Thirty) does a magnificent job of juggling the multiple storylines and creating fully authentic characters—some flawed, some basically decent, some evil." Writing for Rolling Stone, Peter Travers praised the cast and script, giving the film 3.5/4 stars and saying: "Detroit is far more than a liberal howl against the escalating toxicity of racism in America. Bigelow, with the same immersive intensity that Christopher Nolan brings to Dunkirk, smacks us down in the middle of a brutal historical event so we can see it – and feel it – for ourselves."

Conversely, Alexander Nazaryan of Newsweek wrote: "[Bigelow's] characters never come alive, moving through the film less as people than entries in a sociology textbook ... If Bigelow could get inside the minds of soldiers suffocated by post-traumatic stress disorder, as she did so capably in The Hurt Locker, she can get into the mind of anyone. In Zero Dark Thirty, she made even CIA interrogators likeable. The characters in Detroit, though, black and white, are as flat as the plains of the Upper Midwest."

Several critics noted the film's questionable take on a predominantly African American-based story. A. O. Scott of The New York Times wrote: "It is curious that a movie set against a backdrop of black resistance and rebellion—however inchoate and self-destructive its expression may have been—should become a tale of black helplessness and passivity. The white men, the decent ones as much as the brutes, have the answers, the power, the agency." K. Austin Collins of The Ringer wrote: "This movie isn't really about black people as people, nor history as a lived experience, but is instead invested in a dutiful, 'just the facts, ma'am' reenactment that pretends those other things are already a given. Boal, and Bigelow beside him, refuse to speculate about — or imagine — the rest."

The New Yorker's Richard Brody called the film "a moral failure", saying: "[Bigelow's] intentions come through clearly: to depict an incident—and a climate—of racism, to show that the cruelty of these deeds was multiplied by their ultimate impunity, and to suggest that, in the intervening half-century since the events depicted in the film took place, little has changed. Movies aren't made with intentions, though; they're made with people and with equipment, and what Bigelow has her actors do for the benefit of the camera is repellent to imagine."

=== Accolades ===
Award	Date of ceremony	Category	Recipient(s)	Result	Ref.
Black Reel Awards	February 22, 2018	Outstanding Film	Detroit	Nominated	
Black Reel Awards	February 22, 2018	Outstanding Actor, Motion Picture	Algee Smith	Nominated	
Black Reel Awards	February 22, 2018	Outstanding Ensemble	Victoria Thomas	Nominated	
Black Reel Awards	February 22, 2018	Outstanding Score	James Newton Howard	Nominated	
NAACP Image Awards	January 15, 2018	Outstanding Motion Picture	Detroit	Nominated	
NAACP Image Awards	January 15, 2018	Outstanding Actor in a Motion Picture	Algee Smith	Nominated	
NAACP Image Awards	January 15, 2018	Outstanding Writing in a Motion Picture	Mark Boal	Nominated	
NAACP Image Awards	January 15, 2018	Outstanding Independent Motion Picture	Detroit	Won	

== Historical accuracy ==
According to Melvin Dismukes, who is depicted prominently in the film, Detroit "is 99.5% accurate as to what went down at the Algiers and in the city at the time." However, the Los Angeles Times wrote that "Bigelow does say there are moments of fiction, and Boal notes instances of 'pure screenwriting.' Some facts are contested within accounts; others were changed for the screen", and then raised the question: 'Does a disclaimer at the end sufficiently cover fictional manipulations in an ostensibly true story?' " Variety went so far as to state that Bigelow and Boal "changed names [of characters] so as to enjoy other creative liberties in the storytelling." One such subject whose name was dropped in favor of a fictional one is lawyer Norman Lippitt (played in the film by actor John Krasinski under the name Auerbach). Three victims of the Algiers Motel incident were excluded from the film: James Sortor, Roderick Davis (a member of The Dramatics), and Charles Moore (a man in his early 40s whose very presence at the motel that evening was among the many things that were called into question after the fact). The film also does not include the Peoples Tribunal that was held to protest the incident at the Reverend Albert Cleage's church.

In response to the historical criticism, Boal said: "I employed poetic license, under a self-imposed rule to never stray from what I understood to be the underlying truth of a scene or an event. This script is built on a sturdy base of journalism and history, but it is not the same as journalism or history, nor does it aspire to be. As a screenwriter, I take the responsibility of being the creator of a tale, of transforming these raw materials into a drama."

== See also ==
- List of black films of the 2010s
