= Seduction (Boney James album) =

Studio album by Boney James
- Released: 1995
- Studio: Alpha Studios and The Enterprise (Burbank, California); The Complex (Los Angeles, California); Sunset Sound (Hollywood, California); Entourage Studios (North Hollywood, California); Funky Joint Studios (Sherman Oaks, California).
- Genre: Smooth jazz
- Length: 43:19
- Label: Warner Bros.
- Producer: Paul Brown

Boney James chronology
Backbone (1994)	Seduction (1995)	Boney's Funky Christmas (1996)

Professional ratings
Review scores
Source	Rating
AllMusic	5/5 stars

Seduction is the third album by jazz saxophonist Boney James, released in 1995.

== Track listing ==
No.	Title	Writer(s)	Length
1.	"Camouflage"	Paul Brown, Michael Egizi, James Oppenheim,	5:17
2.	"Got It Goin' On"	Brown, Oppenheim, Carl Burnett	5:11
3.	"Lights Down Low"	Oppenheim, Darrell Smith	4:31
4.	"Seduction"	Brown, Oppenheim, Egizi	5:26
5.	"Washington Bridge"	Brown, Oppenheim, Leon Bisquera	5:32
6.	"Without a Doubt"	Brown, Oppenheim, Dwayne Smith	4:37
7.	"Sara Smile"	Daryl Hall, John Oates	3:31
8.	"Second Nature"	Brown, Oppenheim, Darrell Smith	5:18
9.	"Ain't No Sunshine"	Bill Withers	3:56
Total length:			43:19

== Personnel ==
Musicians

- Boney James – all other instruments except where noted, alto saxophone (1, 2), wind synthesizer (1, 9), keyboards (2, 6, 8, 9), tenor saxophone (3, 5–8), soprano saxophone (4, 6, 9), synth bass (5, 9), Minimoog (7)
- Michael Egizi – keyboards (1, 4)
- David Torkanowsky – keyboards (2, 6, 9), acoustic piano (6)
- Darrell Smith – keyboards (3, 7), acoustic piano (8)
- Leon Bisquera – keyboards (5)
- Bob James – acoustic piano (5)
- Eric Cadieux – Pro Tools programming (6)
- Tony Maiden – guitars (1)
- Paul Jackson Jr. – guitars (2–5, 9), guitar solo (2)
- Carl Burnett – Wah Wah guitar (2)
- A. Ray Fuller – guitars (6, 7)
- Marcos Loya – guitars (8), jarana candelas (8)
- Me'Shell NdegéOcello – bass (2)
- Dwayne "Smitty" Smith – synth bass (6)
- Roberto Vally – bass (8), electric bass (9)
- Donnell Spencer Jr. – drums (6)
- Lenny Castro – percussion (1–6, 8, 9)
- Peter Erskine – cymbals (5), drums (8)
- Paul Brown – handclaps (9)
- Dan Higgins – tenor saxophone (3)
- Bill Reichenbach Jr. – trombone (3)
- Jerry Hey – trumpet (3), flugelhorn (3)
- Rick Braun – flugelhorn (8)
- Daddy Shakespeare – vocals (2)
- Roy Galloway – backing vocals (7)
- Jeff Pescetto – backing vocals (7)
- Leslie Smith – backing vocals (7)

Arrangements

- Michael Egizi (1, 4)
- Carl Burnett (2)
- Darrell Smith (3, 7)
- Jerry Hey – horn arrangements (3)
- Leon Bisquera (5)
- Paul Brown (5–9)
- Boney James (5–9)

== Production ==
- Paul Brown – producer, recording, mixing
- Rob Seilert – additional engineer
- Scott Burns – assistant engineer
- Teresa Callin – assistant engineer
- Dave Huron – assistant engineer
- Fred Kelly – assistant engineer
- Liz Magro – assistant engineer
- Charles Nasser – assistant engineer
- Terri Wong – assistant engineer
- Stephen Marcussen – mastering at Precision Mastering (Hollywood, California)
- Lexy Brewer – production coordinator
- Larry Vigon – art direction, design
- Brian Jackson – design
- Taek Jun – photography
- Alison Reynolds – photography, hair stylist, make-up
- Howard Lowell – management
