= Boney's Funky Christmas =

Studio album by Boney James
- Released: October 8, 1996
- Studio: Alpha Studios (Burbank, California); Entourage Studios (North Hollywood, California); Funky Joint Studios (Sherman Oaks, California).
- Genre: Smooth jazz
- Length: 37:57
- Label: Warner Bros.
- Producer: Boney James, Paul Brown

Boney James chronology
Seduction (1995)	Boney's Funky Christmas (1996)	Sweet Thing (1997)

Singles from Boney's Funky Christmas
- 1. "This Christmas" Released: 1996

Professional ratings
Review scores
Source	Rating
AllMusic	3/5 stars

Boney's Funky Christmas is the first Christmas album and fourth studio album by jazz saxophonist Boney James, released in 1996.

== Track listing ==
No.	Title	Writer(s)	Length
1.	"Jingle Bells"		1:43
2.	"This Christmas"		4:14
3.	"Christmas Time Is Here"		4:26
4.	"The Christmas Song"		4:22
5.	"Sleigh Ride"		4:17
6.	"Breath of Heaven"		4:46
7.	"Let It Snow"	Brian McKnight, Wanya Morris	4:37
8.	"What Are You Doing New Year's Eve?"		4:57
9.	"God Rest Ye Merry Gentlemen"		4:35
Total length:			37:57

== Personnel ==
- Boney James – all other instruments except where noted, tenor saxophone (1, 2, 3, 5, 7, 8, 9), alto saxophone (4), Yamaha WX7 (4), soprano saxophone (6)
- Michael Egizi – keyboards (2)
- David Torkanowsky – keyboards (3, 5)
- Randy Kerber – keyboards (4)
- Dan Shea – keyboards (6), drum programming (6)
- Jeff Carruthers – keyboards (7, 9), drum programming (7, 9)
- Greg Karukas – keyboards (8)
- Dwight Sills – guitars (2, 8, 9)
- Bob De Marco – wah wah guitar (2)
- Paul Jackson Jr. – guitars (7)
- Alex Al – bass (3, 4, 5, 8), synth bass (4)
- Donnell Spencer – drum fills (2), drums (8)
- Paul Brown – drum programming (3, 4, 5)
- Paulinho da Costa – percussion (1, 3, 9)
- Lenny Castro – percussion (2, 7)
- Rick Braun – trumpet (9)
- Dee Harvey – vocals (2)
- Jim Gilstrap – vocals (7)
- Leslie Smith – vocals (7)
- Bobby Caldwell – vocals (8)

Arrangements

- Boney James (1, 3, 5, 8, 9)
- Michael Egizi (2)
- Paul Brown (3, 5, 8, 9)
- David Torkanowsky (3, 5)
- Jerry Hey (4)
- Dan Shea (6)
- Jeff Carruthers (7, 9)
- Greg Karukas (8)

== Production ==
- Boney James – producer
- Paul Brown – producer, recording, mixing
- Dan Shea – additional engineer
- Charles Nasser – recording assistant
- Gordon Suffield – recording assistant
- Terri Wong – recording assistant
- Stephen Marcussen – mastering at Precision Mastering (Hollywood, California)
- Lexy Brewer – production coordinator
- Stine Schyberg – art direction, design
- Kip Lott – photography
