= Algiers Motel killings =

Police brutality incident in Detroit

Coordinates: 42.376121°N 83.077510°W

The Algiers Motel killings occurred in Detroit, Michigan, United States, throughout the night of July 25–26, 1967, during the racially charged 12th Street Riot. At the Algiers Motel, approximately 1 mi (1.6 km) east of where the riot began, three civilians were killed and nine others abused by a riot task force composed of the Detroit Police Department, the Michigan State Police, and the Michigan Army National Guard. Among the casualties were three black teenage boys killed, and two white women and seven black men wounded. The task force was searching the area after reports were received that a gunman or group of gunmen, possibly snipers, had been seen at or near the motel.

One death has never been explained as the body was allegedly found by responding officers. Two deaths have been attributed to "justifiable homicide" or "self-defense". Charges of felonious assault, conspiracy, murder, and conspiracy to commit civil rights abuse were filed against three officers. Charges of assault and conspiracy were also filed on a private security guard. All were found not guilty.

== Background ==
=== Riot ===
The 12th Street Riot began in the early morning hours of Sunday, July 23, 1967. The Detroit Police Department at the time was 93% white, of whom 45% working in black neighborhoods were considered to be "extremely anti-Negro" and an additional 34% were "prejudiced". The riot began after police raided a black-owned business that hosted a "blind pig" (illegal bar), during a party to celebrate the safe return of two black Vietnam War veterans. Police had expected a small number of patrons; however, there were 85 or more patrons inside. As the dozens of partygoers were being loaded into police vans, a mob of people formed around the scene. One of the sons of the blind pig's owner jumped on the roof of a car and threw a bottle at the police, and the mob followed suit. In the ensuing violence, numerous businesses were looted or burnt down as the riot spread to other districts of Detroit. At first, police officers were ordered to hold back from responding to the rioting, to prevent an escalation in violence. A curfew was imposed and many people in Detroit stayed home or took shelter. Detroit Fire Department (DFD) personnel were held back from the fires by looters throwing objects at them or by snipers. Michigan Army National Guardsmen were activated by the Michigan government and were patrolling the streets and guarding several large businesses. Michigan State Troopers and United States Army paratroopers were also deployed to patrol the streets.

=== Algiers Motel ===
The Algiers Motel at 8301 Woodward Avenue near the Virginia Park district was a black-owned business, owned by Sam Gant and McUrant Pye. It was one of three motels in Detroit owned by Gant and Pye, the others being the Alamo, at Alfred and Woodward, and the Rio Grande, on West Grand near Grand River. Prior to Gant and Pye's purchase in 1965, the motel's white owner had barred black people from staying at the motel. The Algiers was considered by the police to be a center of illegal drugs and prostitution and was raided regularly by the vice squad. It was located close to the then-headquarters of General Motors (GM) and executives of the firm were regular customers. To the rear of the motel, a three-story detached home, known as the Manor House or Annex, was also rented to clients. Its street address was 50 Virginia Park Street, and it was accessible from Virginia Park and through a driveway from Woodward. The motel itself was laid out in the shape of a "U", with its office, pool and cabana rooms to the left and a two-story wing of rooms to the right around its parking lot. The Manor House could be seen from Woodward Avenue.

=== Motel guests ===
After the riot started, soul vocal group the Dramatics left their concert at the Fox Theater on Saturday, July 22, and checked in at the Algiers. Three of the members—Ron Banks, Larry Demps and Michael Calhoun—left before the 25th, leaving Roderick Davis, Larry Reed, and the band's valet driver Fred Temple at the motel.

On the evening of July 25, the Motel Annex was occupied by several people who had taken refuge from the rioting:

==== Survivors: ====
- Roderick Davis, 21, black male, member of The Dramatics
- Larry Reed, 19, black male, member of The Dramatics
- Charles Moore, early 40s, black male
- Robert Lee Greene, 26, black male, Vietnam War veteran
- Michael Clark, 21, black male
- Lee Forsythe, 20, black male
- James Sortor, 18, black male
- Juli Ann Hysell, 18, white female
- Karen Malloy, 18, white female

==== Killed by gunshot: ====
- Carl Cooper, 17, black male
- Aubrey Pollard, 19, black male
- Fred Temple, 18, black male, valet to The Dramatics

== Incident ==
=== Shooting of the motel ===
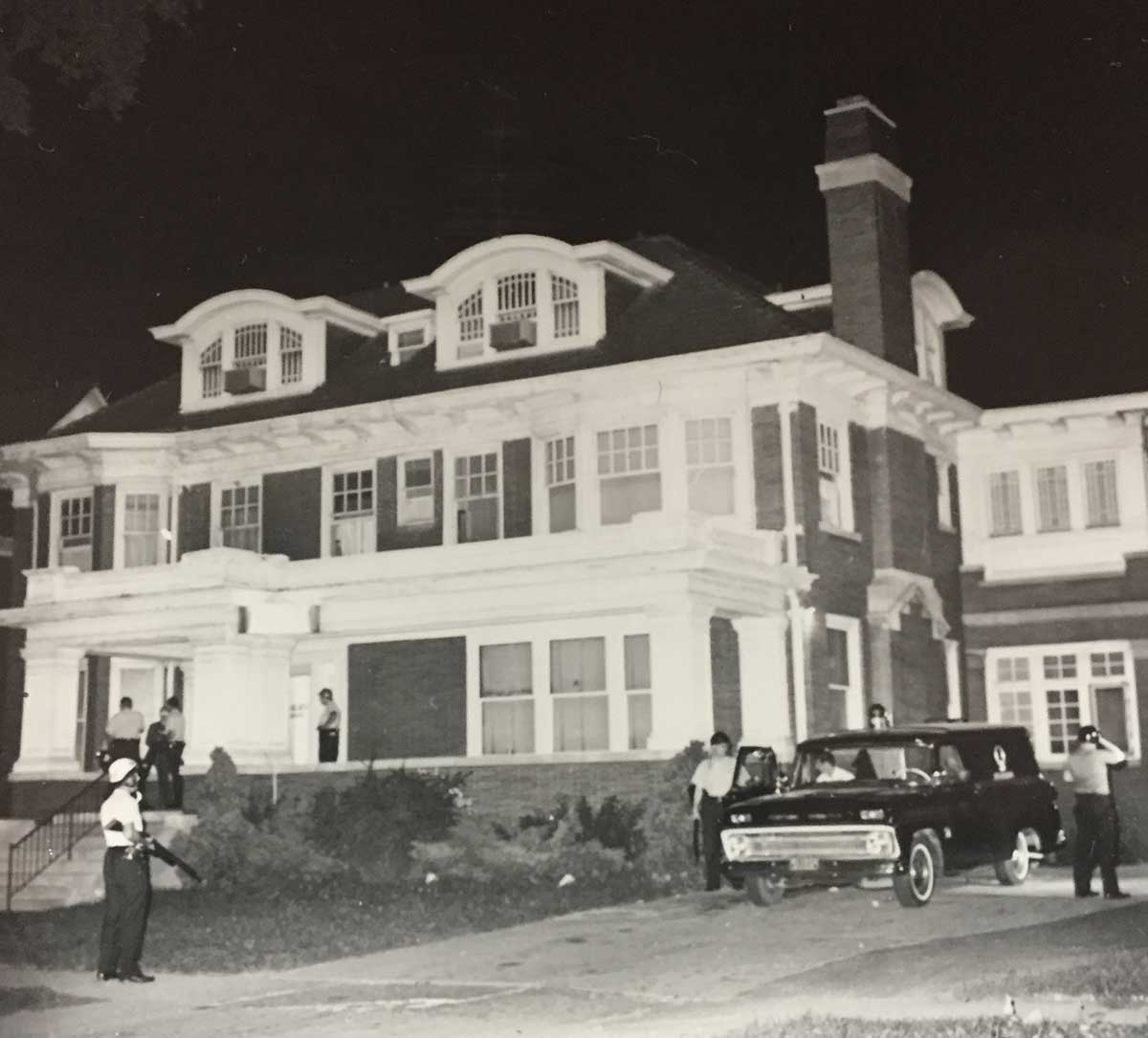
Police standing outside the annex of the Algiers Motel after three bodies were found inside

On July 25, 1967, police and National Guardsmen were protecting the Great Lakes Mutual Life Insurance building one block north. Security guard Melvin Dismukes was guarding a store across the street from the Algiers. After midnight, shots were heard and Guardsman Ted Thomas reported gunfire in the vicinity of the Algiers Motel. A large contingent of Detroit police officers, State Troopers, and Guardsmen were ordered to investigate. They observed people in the windows of the Algiers' annex building, and consequently shot out those windows and stormed the building through its three entrances.

According to testimony, three of the black youths—Cooper, Clark, and Forsythe—and the two white youths, Hysell and Malloy, were listening to music in a third-floor room of the annex. Cooper pulled out a starter pistol and shot blanks in the air, drawing return fire from the various authorities outside. Alarmed and frightened, the occupants fled to other rooms as law enforcement personnel rushed into the annex.

=== Death of Carl Cooper ===
Carl Cooper was the first person shot to death in the incident. Cooper had been in a third-floor room but his dead body was found in a first-floor room, A-2. He was killed by law enforcement personnel when they first entered the building; according to later testimony, he may have been mistaken for an armed rioter. Alternatively, several law enforcement witnesses later testified that Cooper was already dead when they entered the building. The shooting was never fully explained and no one was ever arrested for Cooper's death.

His injuries were consistent with buckshot wounds from the type of shotguns the Detroit Police Department used. In their testimony about the entering of the annex, Guardsmen, State Troopers and Detroit police officers each testified they were not the first to enter, stating that Cooper was already dead when they arrived, leaving responsibility for the death unexplained. In the federal conspiracy trial, the defense would attempt to show that Cooper was killed by occupants of the motel before the police arrived but this was denied by those occupants. They testified that at least one policeman shot into the rooms first and checked for persons later.

=== Abuse of motel guests ===
The occupants of the motel annex were rounded up in the first-floor hallway and lined up against the wall. The various officers present hit each of the persons in turn, threatening to kill them unless they told the officers who had the gun and was sniping from the motel. Two 18-year-old women, Juli Hysell and Karen Malloy, were both forcibly stripped naked and harangued as "nigger lovers". Several of the men were shown a knife on the floor and told to pick it up, so they could be killed in "self-defense". In turn, each of the black youths in line were taken into rooms and intimidated with threats or gunshots and told to stay still and quiet or be killed. The policeman who had escorted the occupant then returned to the hallway, making some comment about the death of the individual. First, per conflicting reports, an officer took one of the youths into a room and fired a shot into the wall, to make the prisoners believe he was dead in a simulated execution. He then asked Guardsman Ted Thomas if he wanted to kill one. Thomas then took an occupant into a room and shot into the ceiling.

=== Death of Aubrey Pollard ===
Aubrey Pollard was then taken to room A-3 by Officer Ronald August. August would later admit to Pollard's killing, stating it was in self-defense. A spent cartridge found next to Pollard was a .300 Savage, a type used for sporting rifles and not issued to police officers. Pollard had extensive injuries to his head. Witnesses described how he had been beaten on the head with a rifle, with force enough to break the rifle. The remaining occupants then admitted that Cooper had a starter pistol and had used it earlier.

=== Departure of police and death of Fred Temple ===
The sound of gunshots was then heard outside the motel and the police officers left. Two remaining officers escorted the remaining prisoners out of the motel annex and told them to run home or they would be killed too. The death of the third youth, Fred Temple, occurred at that time or later. Several of the prisoners who were allowed to leave recalled Temple still being alive when they left the motel. Temple's body was later found in room A-3. He had been shot by Officer Robert Paille, who later testified it was in self-defense during a struggle over his gun.

== Aftermath ==
=== Discovery of corpses ===
The officers did not report the deaths to the Detroit Police Homicide Bureau as required. The next day, on July 26, 1967, Charles Hendrix, whose security firm provided security for the Algiers, found the bodies in the annex and reported the deaths to the Wayne County Morgue, which then called the Detroit Police Homicide Bureau. Detectives Edward Hay, Lyle Thayer, a photographer and several patrolmen arrived around 3 a.m. The scene was examined and the bodies removed. A knife was found next to the body in A-2, but no gun was found and the cartridges and shell casings were left. The investigator's activities, including the flashes from the camera and the presence of police on the roof of the building, were noticed by Guardsmen stationed nearby and they shouted a challenge to identify themselves. The detectives left the scene to return at a later time, feeling it was not safe to stay on scene that night.

=== Press reports ===
The deaths were reported to the press as having happened in an exchange of gunfire with snipers. However, the Detroit Free Press interviewed the witnesses of the events, who all claimed to have been unarmed and that the dead men were not snipers. The deaths were reported to Congressman John Conyers and the NAACP and motel witnesses appeared in a press conference held by Conyers on the conduct of the military and police. The US Department of Justice began an investigation under assistant District Attorney Robert Murphy, who interviewed witnesses. The witnesses' accounts were delivered to Detroit prosecutors on July 29. The Free Press investigated the story and retained a pathologist, Dr. Robert Sillery, to examine the bodies. His conclusions were that all three had been killed inside the home and all had been shot twice, shot from slightly behind and at close range, and in defensive postures.

Five days after the incident, The Detroit News reported the story of one of the survivors, Robert Lee Greene, stating that one of the National Guard warrant officers murdered the men.

=== Charge of Melvin Dismukes ===
Security guard Melvin Dismukes, who was black, was the first to be charged. He was arraigned for the felonious assault of James Sortor and Michael Clark in the first-floor hallway of the annex. He was freed on $1,500 bail. Dismukes's trial took place in May 1968. He was found not guilty of the charge of felonious assault. The all-white jury returned the verdict in 13 minutes.

=== Investigations ===
Officer Ronald August, Officer Robert Paille, and Officer David Senak, confessed to taking part in the killings of Pollard and Temple and were charged with murder. Each spent one night in jail and was released on $5,000 bail. August had given a statement to detectives that the three were dead when he arrived, but asked for that statement back and submitted a second statement asserting he had shot Pollard in self-defense. At the pretrial examination, Guard Warrant Officer Ted Thomas identified August as the shooter of Pollard and 23-year-old Vice Patrolman David Senak as the officer who did the questioning and beating. Senak had allegedly taken part in the killing of two men earlier in the riot before arriving at the Algiers Motel. Paille's initial confession was ruled inadmissible and August claimed self-defense. Senak appeared as a witness and testified that he had not seen August or Paille fire their weapons. One of the motel survivors, Michael Clark, gave conflicting evidence that August and Paille had taken him into a room and threatened him when Hersey falsely wrote Senak and Thomas had actually done so. Judge DeMascio ruled that August could be indicted for the murder of Pollard, but charges against Paille for the murder of Temple were dropped.

=== Protest tribunal ===
The Citywide Citizens' Action Committee, organized by Dan Aldridge, was formed by a coalition of Detroit black leaders. They held a tribunal of their own, convicting August, Paille, Dismukes and Thomas for their roles in the murders and sentencing them to death. The jury included novelist John Killens and activist Rosa Parks. Without revealing himself, Dismukes attended the tribunal.

=== Arrest of Robert Paille and David Senak ===
On August 23, Ronald August, Robert Paille and David Senak were arrested for conspiracy under Michigan law. The conspiracy trial began on September 27 in Recorder's Court. The trial was three days in length. Judge Frank Schemanske dismissed the conspiracy charges in December. Schemanske concluded that while there was "unfortunate violence" at the motel, it was "scarcely surprising" but also "overzealous". He also stated that "[the witnesses] in their calculated prevarication to the point of perjury was so blatant as to defeat its object." The decision was appealed to the Michigan Supreme Court but that was later dismissed.

=== Trial of Robert Paille ===
The dismissal of the murder charge against Paille by Judge DeMascio during the pre-trial was appealed by Prosecutor William L. Cahalan. Recorder's Court Judge Geraldine Ford ordered the case back to Judge DeMascio for further testimony. Paille's attorney Norman Lippitt then appealed to the Michigan Court of Appeals, which chose not to hear the case. Lippitt then appealed to the Michigan Supreme Court. In 1970, the Supreme Court ruled that the Wayne County Court of Appeals should determine whether the case could be reopened. In 1971, the Wayne County Court ordered the Recorder's Court to take additional testimony.

The final appeal would be heard in February 1972. Judge George Ryan of Detroit Recorder's Court would dismiss the murder charge in August 1972, stating that Paille's confession was inadmissible because he had not been advised of his Constitutional rights as per the 1966 Miranda Warning law. He cited the testimony of Detroit detective Charles Schlacter, who stated that he "viewed both August and Paille" as suspects when he took the statements. Schlacter stated that if he had informed them of their rights, they would not have confessed. In Ryan's judgment, the law meant that persons must be advised of their right to remain silent in what was an "atmosphere of coercion."

=== Trial of Ronald August ===
The first-degree murder trial of Ronald August was held in May and June 1969 in Mason, Michigan. It had been moved from Detroit to escape publicity, partly because of a 1968 book on the incident. In opening statements, defense attorney Norman Lippitt described Pollard as "an antisocial personality" and "potential killer" and the killing by August as "justifiable homicide" while prosecutor Avery Weiswasser described the killing as "murder with malice aforethought and with full premeditation."

August admitted killing Pollard, describing it as "justifiable homicide" because Pollard had attempted to grab his shotgun. According to Detroit Free Press reporter Walker Lundy, there were as many descriptions of the shooting as there were witnesses. Two State's witnesses, Greene and Hysell, who had been at the motel, failed to appear to testify.

Guardsman Thomas took one of the youths into a room and fired a shot into the ceiling. Senak then gave August a shotgun and told August to "shoot one". Thomas stated that he heard no sounds of struggle or words between August and Pollard before he saw "a flash of clothing, heard a shotgun blast and saw Pollard's body fall". Thomas then told an officer either "this was police business" or "this was bad business" and "he was leaving". According to Thomas, August said no words throughout the incident.

Karen Malloy, one of the two women in the motel, testified that she saw Cooper shoot a starter's pistol at another black youth in a room on the third floor of the motel. The police then shot out the window of the room and the occupants fled. She ran to the room of Robert Greene and hid there until a police officer with a rifle arrived. The officer fired into the closet and a bathroom. Then, he asked if there was anyone in either place. They were all herded into the first floor hallway, where she said several of the black youths were beaten and taken individually into motel rooms. She testified she was not beaten but she had been forcibly stripped naked. She testified that she could not identify August as one of the officers and that she had not seen any of the killings.

State Troopers Philip Martin, John Fonger and Archie Davies testified at the trial. All testified to the lineup and beatings going on and officers taking individuals from the line into motel rooms and shooting their guns in a "game" to frighten the prisoners. Davies and Fonger testified that they heard shots and then a man in blue shirt and riot helmet leave room A-3, ejecting empty shells from a revolver, stating "that one tried for my gun" and "the room is secure". Martin testified that he saw no resistance, no sniper weapons and no arrests made while at the motel. After Fonger reported the events to his supervisor, the supervisor stated that it was "in the hands of the Detroit Police and he didn't like what was going on" and the Troopers left.

On June 3, August testified in his own defense. He stated that he saw the bodies of Cooper and Temple when he entered the building, and saw a lineup against the wall. He testified that, when asked by Senak, he took Pollard into room A-3 and closed the door. There, Pollard asked if he was going to shoot him. August said he would not and he had never shot anyone. He asked Pollard if he knew anything about a sniper and Pollard said he did not. August testified that Pollard then pushed August's shotgun away and then grabbed the gun. August stated then he tried to fire the gun, but the safety was on. Pollard then came at him and he fired, killing Pollard. He testified: "I thought he was going to take the gun away from me. He scared me." August testified that he did not file a report immediately after the shooting, as required, on the advice of either Paille or Senak. When August arrived at the station the next day, he found out that no one else had filed a report. Paille was the only one with a radio and was supposed to have called for an ambulance and squad car. He testified that he, Senak and Paille filed a joint report. Two days later, they were summoned to the station to file individual statements. August admitted lying in his statement to his supervisor, then asking for the statement back to change it, to admit he had taken part in the shootings and had done so in self-defense.

The trial concluded on June 9 with summations by prosecutor Avery Weisswasser and defense attorney Norman Lippitt. Judge William Beer instructed the all-white jury to either convict August of first-degree murder or acquit him. They could not return a verdict of the lesser charges of second-degree murder or manslaughter, as both the defense and the prosecution had requested. According to the Free Press, legal sources described Beer's instructions to the jury as a direction to find an acquittal on the other possible options. Beer's instructions to the jury were criticized by black leaders as "having all but guaranteed an acquittal" for August. After deliberating for 2 ½ hours, the jury found August not guilty.

=== Federal conspiracy trial ===
The earlier Schemanske decision incensed Kenneth McIntyre, the assistant U.S. District Attorney, and he pushed to reopen a federal investigation of the killings. The Federal Bureau of Investigation (FBI) investigated the case. J. Edgar Hoover personally reviewed the policemen's statements, and described them as "for the most part untrue and were undoubtedly furnished in an attempt to cover their activities and the true series of events." On May 3, 1968, a federal grand jury indicted Melvin Dismukes, Ronald August, Robert Paille and David Senak on a charge of conspiring to deny civil rights to the motel occupants. An indictment was not pursued against Thomas because the government wanted his testimony against the others. The federal conspiracy trial was delayed, both by the assassination of Robert F. Kennedy, but also the publication of a book by John Hersey, The Algiers Motel Incident. U.S. Judge Stephen Roth was assigned the case. The defense asked for a change of venue. Roth closed the hearings to the press and waited a full year until September 1969 before ruling on the change of venue, ordering the trial to be moved to his hometown of Flint, Michigan.

In January and February 1970, the federal conspiracy trial was held in Flint, Michigan. It, like the August murder trial, had been moved from Detroit partially because of the publication of The Algiers Motel Incident. It meant it was nearly impossible to get any black persons on the jury. Defense lawyer Lippitt represented the policemen and admitted later that he felt the book publishing had helped his case as he felt that no black person in Detroit would be impartial. "I wouldn't want a black man on the jury. I was hoping for all the prejudice I could get."

The other woman held prisoner at the motel, Juli Hysell, testified at the trial. She testified about the starter pistol incident and the lineup in the hallway, but could not identify any of the defendants as being present at the motel. James Sortor, another of the black youths held at the motel, did identify the defendants August, Paille and Dismukes as being present at the motel, but he testified that he had not heard any shooting inside the motel. He stated that he "was beaten so many times he lost count." Roderick Davis testified that he had heard the shots and the sounds of people running on the stairs. Both Hysell and Sortor testified that Cooper was still alive when the police arrived.

Senak's lawyer stated that Temple was shot while being handcuffed after Temple grabbed Senak's service revolver. State Trooper Hubert Rosema testified that he heard scuffling noises and gunshots coming from the room. Senak was overheard to yell "He's got my gun" multiple times. He testified that afterwards, he went into the room and saw Temple still breathing, lying against the bed. No aid was called for Temple as far as he knew.

Several witnesses were called to support the charge of a cover-up by August, Paille and Senak to save face. Police Lieutenant Robert Boroni testified about the contents of the July 29 first report the three policemen filed stating that they entered the motel, saw the lineup, saw that the prisoners were already wounded and left. August's July 31 statement stated that he did not fire his gun inside the motel, and he saw no Guardsmen on the premises. Detroit homicide detective Robert Everett testified that August filed a separate statement two hours later that he had shot Pollard in self-defense and that Paille admitted shooting Temple. Police Lieutenant Gerald Hallmark provided a statement that later that day August and Paille asked to revise their statements. According to Hallmark, August said "the media have the events all wrong and that he did what he had to do."

After deliberating for nine hours, an all-white jury found the four not guilty of conspiracy. In a review of the trial, the Detroit Free Press felt that prosecutors Avery Weiswasser and McIntyre were "outpointed by Lippitt."

=== John Hersey book ===
In 1968, writer John Hersey wrote a book about the incident. Hersey interviewed survivors, members of the victims' families and some of the law enforcement personnel who participated in the raid and also consulted forensic reports, in identifying the law enforcement personnel involved in the killings. The proceeds from royalties from the book (over 550,000 copies were printed) were turned over to a college scholarship fund for African American students by Knopf. Hersey stated in the book that he "will not take any money from any source for the publication of this story".

== Legacy ==
=== Lives of police officers ===
The Detroit Police Department rehired Ronald August and David Senak in 1971, after firing them in the aftermath of the Algiers Motel killings. The DPD refused to rehire Robert Paille, citing the false statements he made in his initial incident report. Paille took other jobs including crane operator, construction worker, carpenter and insurance agent. Senak opened a construction business. Dismukes became a security guard for the Detroit Pistons. He received death threats from the Black Panthers. August resigned from the Detroit Police in July 1977. He became a building tradesman. August, Paille, and Senak all moved out of Detroit.

=== Lippitt ===
Norman Lippitt later became an Oakland County Circuit Judge in 1985, then returned to private practice in 1987 in Birmingham, Michigan. Lippitt died on July 26, 2021.

=== Algiers Motel ===
In 1968, Cahalan filed suit to close down the Algiers Motel but was unsuccessful. It re-opened as "The Desert Inn". The motel and manor house were demolished in 1979. This was done as part of the "New Center" urban renewal project sponsored in part by General Motors. The Motel was located at 8301 Woodward Avenue, between Woodward and Virginia Park in the geographic center of Detroit. The site where the motel and the manor house stood is now an open greenspace known as Virginia Park.

=== Lawsuits ===
Both the Pollard family and the Temple family filed lawsuits against the Detroit Police officers. Settlements were reached in each case. In 1976, the City of Detroit paid each family $62,500 ($354,000 today) to settle.

=== Life of Larry Reed ===
Larry Reed left The Dramatics after the incident, and today sings in church choirs.

== Historical marker ==
In July 2024, a historical marker went up at the site.

== In popular culture ==
In 2013, Mercilee Jenkins' play Spirit of Detroit was performed at the Charles H. Wright Museum of African American History. The plot tells the stories of Anthony, a black man, and Lucy, a white woman, who were friends in childhood and reunite at the Algiers Motel while hiding out from the violence during the 1967 Detroit uprising.

In 2017, Annapurna Pictures released Detroit, a feature film dramatization of the 12th Street Riot and the Algiers Motel incident, directed by Kathryn Bigelow. Hysell acted as a special advisor on the film and was present every day on the set. The movie soundtrack includes a singing performance by Algee Smith of Larry Reed's song "Grow".

== See also ==
- List of homicides in Michigan
