= Sweet Thing (album) =

Studio album by Boney James
- Released: May 27, 1997
- Studio: Alpha Studios and The Enterprise (Burbank, California); Funky Joint Studios (Sherman Oaks, California); Sunset Sound (Hollywood, California); Entourage Studios (North Hollywood, California).
- Genre: Smooth jazz
- Length: 41:59
- Label: Warner Bros.
- Producer: Boney James, Paul Brown

Boney James chronology
Boney's Funky Christmas (1996)	Sweet Thing (1997)	Body Language (1999)

Singles from Sweet Thing
- 1. "I Still Dream" Released: 1997; 2. "Sweet Thing" Released: 1997; 3. "Innocence" Released: 1997; 4. "It's All Good" Released: 1997

Professional ratings
Review scores
Source	Rating
AllMusic	4.5/5 stars

Sweet Thing is the fifth album by jazz saxophonist Boney James, released in 1997. "I Still Dream" features Al Jarreau.

== Track listing ==
CD
No.	Title	Writer(s)	Length
1.	"East Bay"	Paul Brown; James Oppenheim; Dan Shea	5:19
2.	"Nothin' But Love"	Brown; Oppenheim; Carl Burnett	5:01
3.	"Words (Unspoken)"	Alex Al; Oppenheim	4:38
4.	"Sweet Thing"	Chaka Khan; Tony Maiden	3:56
5.	"It's All Good"	Brown; Oppenheim; Darrell Smith	5:14
6.	"After the Rain"	Oppenheim	4:40
7.	"Innocence"	Brown; Oppenheim; Smith	4:30
8.	"I Still Dream" (duet with Al Jarreau)	Brown; Oppenheim; John Stoddart; Scott Cross	4:14
9.	"Ivory Coast"	Oppenheim; Roberto Vally	4:27
Total length:			41:59

== Personnel ==
- Boney James – soprano saxophone (1, 4, 5, 9), alto saxophone (2, 8), keyboards (2, 6, 8, 9), Yamaha WX7 (2), tenor saxophone (3, 6, 7), Wurlitzer electric piano (4, 5)
- Dan Shea – keyboards (1)
- David Torkanowsky – keyboards (2, 4), additional keyboards (5), vibraphone solo (5), strings (7), acoustic piano solo (9)
- Alex Al – keyboards (3), Nord synth lead (3), bass (3, 4), drum programming (3)
- Jeff Carruthers – keyboards (4), drum programming (4)
- Darrell Smith – keyboards (5, 7), drum programming (5), electric piano (6)
- John Stoddart – keyboards (8)
- Daddy Shakespeare – Moog synthesizer (8)
- Peter White – accordion (9), guitars (9)
- Paul Jackson Jr. – guitars (1, 2, 7, 8)
- Tony Maiden – guitars (4, 5), vocals (4)
- Larry Kimpel – bass (1, 6, 7, 9)
- Lil' John Roberts – drums (1, 6, 7)
- Paul Brown – drum programming (2, 6–9), additional programming (5)
- Lenny Castro – percussion (1, 2, 5, 6, 8)
- Paulinho da Costa – percussion (7, 9)
- Dan Higgins – tenor saxophone (1)
- Bill Reichenbach Jr. – trombone (1)
- Jerry Hey – flugelhorn (1)
- Maxyan Lewis – vocals (4)
- Dee Harvey – vocals (5)
- Al Jarreau – vocals (8)
- Bridgette Bryant-Fiddmont – backing vocals (8)

Arrangements

- Paul Brown (1, 2, 4–9)
- Carl Burnett (2)
- Boney James (2, 4–9)
- Alex Al (3)
- Jeff Carruthers (4)
- Tony Maiden (5)
- Darrell Smith (5, 7)

== Production ==
- Boney James – producer
- Paul Brown – producer, recording, mixing
- Dave Rideau – additional engineer, co-mixing (4)
- Dan Shea – additional engineer
- Erik Zobler – additional engineer
- Tony Alvarez Jr. – recording assistant
- Cappy Japngie – recording assistant
- Charles Nasser – recording assistant, mix assistant
- Matt Pakucko – mix assistant
- Stephen Marcussen – mastering at Precision Mastering (Hollywood, California)
- Lexy Brewer – production coordinator
- Larry Vigon – art direction, design
- Brian Jackson – design
- James Minchin III – photography
- Howard Lowell – management
