= The Dramatics =

American rhythm and blues group

- Origin: Detroit, Michigan, U.S.
- Genres: R&B; pop; soul
- Years active: 1964–present
- Labels: Volt; ABC
- Members: Larry "LJ" Reynolds; Cleveland Jones Jr; Willie Greene Jr; Mario Corbino; Tony Glover
- Past members: Ron Banks; Larry "Squirrel" Demps; Willie Ford; William "Wee Gee" Howard; Elbert Wilkins; Lenny Mayes; Barrington "Bo" Henderson; Michael Brock; Larry Reed; Roderick Davis; Craig Jones; Steven Boyd; Harley K. Brown; Robert Ellington; James "JB" Mack Brown; Paul Hill; Winzell Kelly; Leon Franklin; Lavell Jackson; Andre Delano Jones
- Website: https://staxrecords.com/artist/the-dramatics

The Dramatics are an American soul music vocal group, formed in Detroit, Michigan, in 1964. They are best known for their 1970s hit songs "In the Rain" and "Whatcha See Is Whatcha Get", both of which were Top 10 Pop hits, as well as their later 1993 collaboration "Doggy Dogg World" with Snoop Dogg, a top 20 hit on the Billboard Rhythmic Top 40.

== Career ==
The Dramatics, founded by Ron Banks (May 10, 1951 – March 4, 2010), Larry Demps, Rod Davis, Elbert Wilkins and Larry Reed, originally formed in 1964. They were originally known as the Sensations, but changed their billing to the Dramatics in 1965. Their first release in 1965 entitled "Bingo" was recorded for Wingate, a division of Golden World Records in Detroit, Michigan. By 1967, Motown had absorbed the entire Golden World Records operation. The Dramatics then moved to another local Detroit label, Sport Records, where they garnered their first minor hit single, "All Because of You". After becoming victims in the July 1967 Algiers Motel incident, including the police killing of the group's valet Fred Temple, Reed and Davis eventually left the group, and were replaced by William "Wee Gee" Howard and Willie Ford (July 10, 1950 – May 28, 2019) in 1969.

The Dramatics signed with Stax Records of Memphis, Tennessee in 1968, but moved on after one unsuccessful release, the 1969 Temptations-inspired tune "Your Love Was Strange" (Volt VOA 4029), written by group members Ron Banks, William "Wee Gee" Howard, and Elbert "Al" Wilkins, which got regional airplay, but never charted nationally. This song was re-released as the "B" side to the hit, "Toast to the Fool" (Volt VOA 4082) three years later. However, producer Don Davis re-signed them to Volt, a Stax subsidiary, in 1971 after the group teamed up with Detroit writer-producer, Tony Hester. They broke through with their first release recorded with Hester, "Whatcha See Is Whatcha Get", which Hester offered them after seeing the group perform in a Detroit nightclub. The song went into the Top 10 of the Billboard Hot 100, peaking at number 9 and climbing to number 3 in the R&B chart. "Whatcha See Is Whatcha Get" was awarded gold disc status by the R.I.A.A. in December 1971.

Their members at this time were Ron Banks, William "Wee Gee" Howard, Elbert Wilkins, Willie Ford, and Larry Demps. These five members are often thought of as the original Dramatics, though it is more accurate to call them "the Classic Five", as only Ron Banks, Larry Demps and Elbert Wilkins were part of the original line-up. This quintet are the five singers that the general public first got to know as The Dramatics.

Shortly after the success of their first album, Howard and Wilkins left the group, and formed their own version of the Dramatics, recording the single "No Rebate On Love" on Mainstream Records. They were replaced by Larry James "L.J." Reynolds and Leonard "Lenny" Mayes (who died of lung cancer on November 8, 2004, at the age of 53). At the urging of Don Davis and Stax Records, the original group changed its billing to "Ron Banks and the Dramatics". These two groups toured the concert circuit for four years before Banks' group won a court battle, when they bought Howard and Wilkins out and gained full access to the name. Howard and Wilkins were forced to change the name of their group to "A Dramatic Experience". Banks, Demps and Ford then had the trademark rights to the name, and then extended that right to Mayes and Reynolds.

Through the 1970s, the group continued to have successful songs, including the Top 10 Pop, number 1 R&B hit, "In the Rain" in 1972, "Hey You! Get Off My Mountain" (number 5 R&B), "Me and Mrs Jones" (number 4 R&B), originally recorded by Billy Paul three years earlier, "Be My Girl" (number 3 R&B), and "Shake It Well" (number 4 R&B). "In the Rain" also reached number 5 on the Hot 100 pop chart and was their second million-seller.

The group recorded for Don Davis' Groovesville and later Great Lakes music production companies during the 1970s, although the recordings appeared on several labels. The group moved from Volt in 1974 after three albums, Whatcha See Is What You Get (1971), A Dramatic Experience (1973) and Dramatically Yours (1974). They also featured on The Dells vs. The Dramatics on Chess Records' subsidiary Cadet, together with the Dells, who were also being produced by Davis at the time. The group then signed for ABC in 1975 and transferred five years later to MCA, after ABC closed following its buy-out by MCA. Many of the Dramatics' songs initially were written and produced by Tony Hester, including all the tracks on the first two Volt albums. Davis, then Banks and Reynolds took over production later in the 1970s and the early 1980s.

In 1982, the group moved to Capitol Records and made their first album without Don Davis, with Banks acting as producer. Only Banks, Ford and Mayes remained in the group. L.J. Reynolds left to go solo in 1981 and Larry Demps decided to go into teaching and spend more time with his family, after having joined the group's original line-up in 1964 with Banks. When Ron Banks also decided to try a solo career, the group disbanded for a few years, but re-formed in the mid-1980s, with Howard returning to join Reynolds, Mayes, Ford and Banks to record for Fantasy Records.

From 2012 there were two groups of the Dramatics. One group was led by L.J. Reynolds, with Winzell Kelly, Leon Franklin, Donald Albert and Levell Thompson. The other group was led by the original member of the Dramatics, Willie Lee Ford, with Rick Littleton, Michael Brock, Douglas Gaddy and Gregory Finley, plus in 2017 long time member Paul Hill, of George Clinton's Parliament/Funkadelic band joined Willie Ford's Dramatics. The Dramatics featuring Willie Ford focused on staying true to the Dramatics' original and recognizable concept of five part harmonies and five dynamic lead voices in the group, at their shows until his death at 68 years old, on May 28, 2019, after having surgery. L.J. Reynolds' Dramatics featured the singing-talents of Reynolds and also included music from Reynolds' solo career at their shows. On September 24, 2018, L.J. Reynolds legally took the trademark rights to the name the Dramatics.

LJ Reynolds married Lua Leongbergeron-Reynolds, and resides in Detroit. To this day, LJ Reynolds and The Dramatics continue to play.

The Dramatics were officially inducted into the R&B Music Hall of Fame at Cleveland State University's Waetejen Auditorium on Saturday August 17, 2013.

The Dramatics are depicted centrally in the 2017, Kathryn Bigelow film Detroit, a dramatization of the Algiers Motel killings.

In 2020, reviewing I Escaped from Devil's Island (1973) on the website of his New Beverly Cinema, Quentin Tarantino pointed out that the film's director Bill Witney, concluded "a directing career that spanned constant shooting of film since the mid-thirties" by filming The Dramatics singing "Whatcha See Is Whatcha Get."

== Discography ==
=== Studio albums ===
Year	Album	Peak chart positions			Certifications (sales thresholds)	Record label
Year	Album	US	US R&B	CAN	Certifications (sales thresholds)	Record label
1971	Whatcha See Is Whatcha Get	20	5	—		Volt
1973	A Dramatic Experience	86	11	—		Volt
1974	The Dells vs. The Dramatics	156	15	—		Cadet
1974	Dramatically Yours ^{[A]}	—	36	—		Volt
1975	The Dramatic Jackpot ^{[A]}	31	9	89		ABC
1975	Drama V	93	10	—		ABC
1976	Joy Ride	103	11	—		ABC
1977	Shake It Well	60	10	—		ABC
1978	Do What You Wanna Do	44	6	72	RIAA: Gold	ABC
1979	Anytime, Anyplace	—	15	—		ABC
1980	10½	61	14	—		MCA
1980	The Dramatic Way	—	38	—		MCA
1982	New Dimension	—	40	—		Capitol
1986	Somewhere in Time (A Dramatic Reunion)	—	55	—		Fantasy
1989	Positive State of Mind	—	80	—		Volt
1990	Stone Cold	—	—	—		Volt
1994	Mellow Drama	—	—	—		Groovesville
1997	A Dramatic Christmas: The Very Best Christmas of All	—	—	—		Fantasy
1999	If You Come Back to Me	—	—	—		Volt
2002	Look Inside	—	—	—		BBEG
"—" denotes a recording that did not chart or was not released in that territory.

- ^{A} Album credited to Ron Banks & the Dramatics.

=== Live albums ===
- Live (1988, Stax)
- Greatest Hits Live (2002, Stax Records/Fantasy)

=== Compilation albums ===
- The Best of the Dramatics (1974, Volt)
- Be My Girl: Their Greatest Love Songs (1998, Hip-O)
- Shake It Well: The Best of the Dramatics 1974-1980 (1998, MCA)
- Say the Word: Their Greatest Love Songs, Vol. 2 (1999, Hip-O)
- Ultimate Collection (2000, Hip-O)
- 20th Century Masters - The Millennium Collection: The Best of the Dramatics (2005, Hip-O)
- The Very Best of the Dramatics (2007, Stax)
- Greatest Slow Jams (2014, Stax)

=== DVDs ===
- Biggest Hits Live (2009, Soul Concerts)

=== Singles ===
Year	Single (A-side, B-side) Both sides from same album except where indicated	Peak chart positions			Album
Year	Single (A-side, B-side) Both sides from same album except where indicated	US	US R&B	CAN	Album
1963	"Toy Soldier" b/w "Hello Summer"	—	—	—	Non-album tracks
1965	"Bingo" b/w "Somewhere"	—	—	—	Non-album tracks
1966	"Inky Dinky Wang Dang Doo" b/w "Baby I Need You"	—	—	—	Non-album tracks
1967	"All Because of You" b/w "If You Haven't Got Love"	—	43	—	Non-album tracks
1969	"Your Love Was Strange" b/w "Since I've Been in Love"	—	—	—	Non-album tracks
1971	"Whatcha See Is Whatcha Get" b/w "Thankful for Your Love"	9	3	44	Whatcha See Is Whatcha Get
1971	"Get Up and Get Down" b/w "Fall in Love, Lady Love"	78	16	—	Whatcha See Is Whatcha Get
1972	"In the Rain" b/w "(Gimme Some) Good Soul Music"	5	1	31	Whatcha See Is Whatcha Get
1972	"Toast to the Fool" b/w "Your Love Was Strange" (Non-album track)	67	18	—	Dramatically Yours
1973	"Hey You! Get Off My Mountain" b/w "The Devil Is Dope"	43	5	—	A Dramatic Experience
1973	"Fell for You" b/w "Now You Got Me Loving You"	45	12	—	A Dramatic Experience
1974	"And I Panicked" b/w "Beware of the Man" (from A Dramatic Experience)	—	49	—	Dramatically Yours
1974	"Choosing Up on You" /	—	30	—	The Dells vs. The Dramatics
1974	"Door to Your Heart"	62	25	—	The Dells vs. The Dramatics
1974	"Highway to Heaven" ^{[B]} b/w "I Made Myself Lonely"	—	—	—	Dramatically Yours
1974	"Don't Make Me No Promises" /	—	63	—	The Dells vs. The Dramatics
1975	"Tune Up"	—	74	—	The Dells vs. The Dramatics
1975	"Me and Mrs. Jones" ^{[B]} b/w "I Cried All the Way Home"	47	4	78	The Dramatic Jackpot
1975	"Love Is Missing from Our Lives" b/w "I'm In Love"; Both tracks with The Dells	—	46	—	The Dells vs. The Dramatics
1975	"(I'm Going by) The Stars in Your Eyes" ^{[B]} b/w "Trying to Get Over Losing You"	81	22	—	The Dramatic Jackpot
1975	"No Rebate on Love" b/w "Feel It"	—	26	—	Non-album tracks
1975	"You're Fooling You" b/w "I'll Make It So Good"	87	10	—	Drama V
1976	"Treat Me Like a Man" b/w "I Was the Life of the Party"	—	49	—	Drama V
1976	"Finger Fever" b/w "Say the Word"	—	23	—	Joy Ride
1976	"Be My Girl" b/w "Richest Man Alive"	53	3	65	Joy Ride
1977	"I Can't Get Over You" b/w "Sundown Is Coming (Hold Back the Night)"	101	9	99	Joy Ride
1977	"Shake It Well" b/w "That Heaven Kind of Feeling"	76	4	—	Shake It Well
1978	"Ocean of Thoughts and Dreams" b/w "Come Inside"	106	17	—	Shake It Well
1978	"Stop Your Weeping" b/w "California Sunshine"	—	22	—	Do What You Wanna Do
1978	"Do What You Want to Do" b/w "Jane"	—	56	—	Do What You Wanna Do
1978	"Why Do You Want to Do Me Wrong" b/w "Yo' Love (Can Only Bring Me Happiness)	—	—	—	Do What You Wanna Do
1979	"I Just Wanna Dance with You" b/w "I've Got a Schoolboy Crush on You" (Non-album track)	—	35	—	Any Time Any Place
1979	"That's My Favorite Song" b/w "Bottom Line Woman"	—	40	—	Any Time Any Place
1980	"Welcome Back Home" b/w "A Marriage on Paper Only" (from Any Time Any Place)	—	9	—	10 1/2
1980	"Be With the One You Love" b/w "If You Feel Like You Wanna Dance, Dance"	—	79	—	10 1/2
1980	"Get It" b/w "Share Your Love with Me"	—	59	—	The Dramatic Way
1980	"You're the Best Thing in My Life" b/w "(We Need More) Loving Time"	—	26	—	The Dramatic Way
1982	"Live It Up" b/w "She's My Kind of Girl"	—	40	—	New Dimension
1982	"Treat Me Right" b/w "Night Life"	—	62	—	New Dimension
1986	"Luv's Calling" b/w "Dream Lady"	—	—	—	Somewhere In Time (A Dramatic Reunion)
1986	"One Love Ago" b/w "Dream Lady"	—	61	—	Somewhere In Time (A Dramatic Reunion)
1986	"When Love Is Over" (B-side unknown)	—	—	—	Somewhere In Time (A Dramatic Reunion)
1988	"Born to Be Wild" b/w "Born to Be Wild" (Instrumental)	—	—	—	Non-album tracks
1988	"We Are the Champions" (with Thomas Hearns) b/w "We Are the Champions (Part 2)"	—	—	—	Non-album tracks
1989	"Bridge Over Troubled Water" b/w "Please Say You'll Be Mine"	—	93	—	Positive State of Mind
1990	"Ready 4 Love" b/w "Just A Little Bit"	—	—	—	Stone Cold
1994	"Doggy Dogg World"; Snoop Dogg featuring Tha Dogg Pound and The Dramatics	46	—	—	Doggystyle
1996	"Try Love Again" (CD single with various mixes)	—	82	—	Non-album tracks
1997	"The Golden Horn" b/w "All I Want for Christmas Is My Baby"	—	—	—	Non-album tracks
1998	"Saying Goodbye" (Release format unknown)	—	—	—	Non-album tracks
2002	"Ballin'"; Snoop Dogg featuring The Dramatics and Lil' ½ Dead	—	—	—	Paid tha Cost to Be da Boss
2015	"Victoria"; The Dramatics featuring Willie Ford	—	—	—	
"—" denotes a recording that did not chart or was not released in that territory.

- ^{B} Single credited to Ron Banks & the Dramatics
