= The Very Best of the Dramatics =

The Very Best of The Dramatics

Compilation album by The Dramatics
- Released: July 17, 2007
- Recorded: 1969–1974, 1989
- Genre: R&B, Southern soul
- Length: 1:06:16
- Label: Stax; STXCD-30304
- Producer: Rob Bowman

Professional ratings
Review scores
Source	Rating
Allmusic	4.5/5 stars

The Very Best of The Dramatics is a compilation album by American soul vocal group The Dramatics released on Concord Records. The album is part of Stax's Very Best Series.

Allmusic review by Al Campbell says: "This 2007 compilation is slightly superior than the 1976 version Best of the Dramatics, also on Stax, due to overall improved sound quality and the addition of the tracks "Your Love Was Strange" from 1969 and their last R&B charted single "Bridge Over Troubled Water" from the late '80s."

== Track listing ==
1. "Your Love Was Strange" - 3:00
2. "Whatcha See Is Whatcha Get" - 3:36
3. "Get Up and Get Down" - 3:10
4. "In The Rain" - 3:29
5. "Toast to The Fool" - 4:17
6. "The Devil is Dope" - 5:22
7. "Hey You! Get Off My Mountain" - 3:29
8. "Fell for You" - 3:15
9. "And I Panicked" - 3:34
10. "Highway to Heaven" - 3:55
11. "Bridge Over Troubled Water" - 5:13
12. "Thank You for Your Love" - 4:24
13. "Gimme Some (Good Soul Music)" -2:32
14. "Fall in Love, Lady Love" - 3:34
15. "You Could Become The Very Heart of Me" - 2:42
16. "Beware of the Man (With The Candy in His Hand)" - 2:45
17. "I Dedicate My Life to You" - 3:32
18. "I Made Myself Lonely" - 3:49
