= Shake It Up (Boney James & Rick Braun album) =

Studio album by Boney James & Rick Braun
- Released: May 30, 2000
- Studio: Alpha Studios (Burbank, California); Funky Joint Studios (Sherman Oaks, California); Schnee Studios (North Hollywood, California).
- Genre: Smooth jazz
- Length: 47:36; 27:33 (Words + Music EP)
- Label: Warner Bros.
- Producer: Boney James, Paul Brown, Rick Braun

Boney James & Rick Braun chronology
Body Language (1999)	Shake It Up (2000)	Ride (2001)

Singles from Shake It Up
- 1. "R.S.V.P." Released: 2000; 2. "Grazin' in the Grass" Released: 2000

Professional ratings
Review scores
Source	Rating
AllMusic	4/5 stars

Shake It Up is an album by smooth jazz musicians Boney James and Rick Braun, released in 2000.

== Track listing ==
No.	Title	Writer(s)	Length
1.	"R.S.V.P."	Rick Braun, Paul Brown, Jim Oppenheim, David Woods	4:43
2.	"Grazin' in the Grass"	Harry Elston, Philemon Hou	5:08
3.	"More Than You Know"	Braun, Brown, Oppenheim, Darrell Smith	4:32
4.	"Shake It Up"	Braun, Brown, Oppenheim, Carl Burnett	4:03
5.	"Central Ave."	Brown	4:09
6.	"Love's Like That" (featuring Fourplay)	Braun, Brown, Oppenheim	4:28
7.	"Song for My Father"	Horace Silver	5:58
8.	"Chain Reaction"	Braun, Brown, Oppenheim, Michael Egizi, Joe Sample	5:05
9.	"The Stars Above"	Oppenheim, Phil Davis	5:09
10.	"Grazin' in the Grass" (Vocal Version)		4:21
Total length:			47:36

Words + Music (Promotional EP)
No.	Title	Length
1.	"Segment One" (Grazin' in the Grass • Shake It Up • More Than You Know)	13:43
2.	"Segment Two" (Central Avenue • Song for My Father • Grazin' in the Grass (Can You Dig It? Vocal))	13:50
Total length:		27:33

== Personnel ==
Musicians

- Boney James – tenor saxophone (1–8), keyboards (1, 6–9), Yamaha WX7 (8), alto saxophone (9), soprano saxophone (10), programming (9)
- Rick Braun – trumpet (1, 2, 4–8), flugelhorn (3, 9), keyboards (6)
- David "Kahlid" Woods – keyboards (1, 5), keyboard bass (1, 5), programming (1, 5)
- Phil Davis – Wurlitzer electric piano (2), keyboards (9)
- Larry Williams – strings (2)
- Darrell Smith – keyboards (3), keyboard bass (3), programming (3)
- Carl Burnett – keyboards (4), keyboard bass (4), programming (4), guitars (4)
- Dave Torkanowsky – acoustic piano (4, 5), keyboards (7)
- Paul Brown – programming (5), drum programming (7)
- Bob James – keyboards (6)
- Michael Egizi – keyboards (8), programming (8)
- Rohn Lawrence – guitars (2, 3, 7)
- Paul Jackson Jr. – guitars (5, 9)
- Larry Carlton – guitars (6)
- Bob DeFranco – guitars (8)
- Tony Maiden – guitars (8)
- Larry Kimpel – bass (2)
- Alex Al – bass (5, 7, 9)
- Nathan East – bass (6)
- Lil' John Roberts – drums (2, 5, 7)
- Gary Novak – drums (4)
- Harvey Mason – drums (6)
- Paulinho da Costa – percussion (2–9)
- Alex Brown – vocals (10)
- Sue Ann Carwell – vocals (10)
- Keturah Claiborne – vocals (10)
- Kristle Murden – vocals (10)
- Yvonne Williams – vocals (10)

Arrangements

- Boney James (1, 2, 6, 7, 9), vocal arrangements (10)
- Rick Braun (1, 2, 6, 7)
- Paul Brown (1, 2, 5–7), vocal arrangements (10)
- David "Kahlid" Woods (1, 5)
- Phil Davis (2)
- Darrell Smith (3)
- Carl Burnett (4)
- Dave Torkanowsky (7)
- Michael Egizi (8)
- Sue Ann Carwell – vocal arrangements (10)

== Production ==
- Boney James – producer
- Paul Brown – producer, engineer, mixing (2, 9, 10)
- Rick Braun – co-producer (2, 6, 10)
- Dave Rideau – engineer
- Bill Schnee – engineer, mixing (1, 3, 4, 5, 7, 8)
- Al Schmitt – mixing (6)
- Koji Egawa – Pro Tools editing
- Stephen Marcussen – mastering at A&M Mastering Studios (Hollywood, California)
- Lexy Shrayer – production coordinator
- Vigon/Ellis – art direction, design
- Horst Stasny – photography
