= Joy Ride (album) =

Studio album by The Dramatics
- Released: 1976
- Studio: United Sound Systems, Detroit, Michigan
- Genre: R&B
- Label: ABC
- Producer: Don Davis, Tony Hester, LJ Reynolds, Ron Banks, Jimmy Roach, Michael Henderson

The Dramatics chronology
Drama V (1975)	Joy Ride (1976)	Shake It Well (1977)

Singles from Joy Ride
- 1. "Finger Fever" Released: 1976; 2. "Be My Girl" Released: 1976; 3. "I Can't Get over You" Released: 1977

Professional ratings
Review scores
Source	Rating
AllMusic	3/5 stars
The Encyclopedia of Popular Music	3/5 stars

Joy Ride is the seventh studio album from American R&B group The Dramatics, released in 1976 via ABC Records. The album peaked at #103 on the Billboard 200 and at #11 on the Billboard R&B chart.

Three singles were released from the album: "Finger Fever", "Be My Girl" and "I Can't Get over You". "Be My Girl" was the most successful single from the album, peaking at #53 on the Billboard Hot 100.

== Track listing ==
No.	Title	Writer(s)	Producer(s)	Length
1.	"Finger Fever"	Tony Hester	Tony Hester	3:05
2.	"Richest Man Alive"	Edward Robinson	Don Davis	2:50
3.	"Stand Up and Move"	LJ Reynolds	LJ Reynolds	4:03
4.	"Sing and Dance Your Troubles Away"	Garry Glenn	Ron Banks	3:15
5.	"I Get Carried Away"	Jimmy Roach	Jimmy Roach	4:19
6.	"Be My Girl"	Michael Henderson	Michael Henderson	3:53
7.	"After This Dance"	Michael Henderson	Michael Henderson	4:20
8.	"Say the Word"	Tony Hester	Tony Hester	4:08
9.	"I Can't Get over You"	Eddie McGhee; Floyd Fleshman; John Brinson	Don Davis	3:48
10.	"Sundown Is Coming (Hold Back the Night)"	Norma Toney	Don Davis	4:18

== Chart positions ==
Chart (1997)	Peak position
US Billboard 200	103
US R&B Albums (Billboard)	11
