= Be My Girl (The Dramatics song) =

Single by The Dramatics

from the album Joy Ride
- B-side: "Richest Man Alive"
- Released: 1976
- Genre: R&B
- Length: 3:53
- Label: ABC
- Songwriter(s): Michael Henderson
- Producer(s): Michael Henderson

The Dramatics singles chronology
"Finger Fever" (1976)	"Be My Girl" (1976)	"I Can't Get over You" (1977)

"Be My Girl" is a song performed by American R&B group The Dramatics, issued as the second single from their seventh studio album Joy Ride. The song peaked at #53 on the Billboard Hot 100 in 1976., and was a Top 10 national Billboard R&B hit, peaking at # 3.

== Chart positions ==
Chart (1976)	Peak position
US Billboard Hot 100	53
US R&B Singles (Billboard)	3
Canada (RPM)	65
