= Backbone (Boney James album) =

Studio album by Boney James
- Released: May 24, 1994
- Studio: Alpha Studios (Burbank, CA)
- Genre: Smooth jazz
- Length: 42:25
- Label: Warner Bros.
- Producers: Paul Brown; tracks 2 and 3 co-produced by Jeff Carruthers

Boney James chronology
Trust (1992)	Backbone (1994)	Seduction (1995)

Singles from Backbone
- 1. "Happy Home" Released: 1994

Professional ratings
Review scores
Source	Rating
AllMusic	3/5 stars

Backbone is the second album by jazz saxophonist Boney James, released in 1994. Backbone the album is James's first release with Warner Bros. Records.

No.	Title	Writer(s)	Length
1.	"Backbone"	James Oppenheim, Paul Brown, L. Carl Burnett	4:25
2.	"Bleecker Street"	Oppenheim, Brown, Jeff Carruthers, Sheppard Solomon	4:21
3.	"Just Between Us"	Oppenheim, Brown, Carruthers, Vincent Berry	4:47
4.	"Trinidad"	Oppenheim, Brown, Roberto Vally	4:43
5.	"Blue"	Kiki Ebsen	2:39
6.	"Love You All My Lifetime"	Klarmann/Weber	5:00
7.	"Happy Home"	Valerie Davis, Steve Harvey, Karyn White	5:58
8.	"One Autumn Night"	Oppenheim, Darrell Smith	5:00
9.	"The Night I Fell in Love"	Luther Vandross, Marcus Miller	5:32
Total length:			42:25

== Personnel ==
Musicians

- Boney James – all other instruments except where noted, tenor saxophone (1–6, 8, 9), soprano saxophone (2, 3, 7), Yamaha WX7 (2, 9), keyboards (4, 7), clavinet (6)
- David Torkanowsky – acoustic piano (1, 3), keyboards (4, 7)
- Jeff Carruthers – keyboards (2, 6)
- Kiki Ebsen – keyboards (5)
- Darrell Smith – keyboards (8)
- Paul Jackson Jr. – guitars (1, 2, 3, 8)
- Allen Hinds – guitars (6)
- Doc Powell – guitars (7, 9)
- Peter White – acoustic guitar (8)
- Freddie Washington – bass (2, 8)
- Roberto Vally – bass (4)
- Dwayne "Smitty" Smith – bass (7)
- Lenny Castro – percussion (1–4, 8, 9)
- Sam RIney – alto flute (4)
- Bridgette Bryant – vocals (7)
- Alex Brown – vocals (9)
- Gene Van Buren – vocals (9)

Arrangements

- Boney James (1, 3, 4, 7, 8)
- Paul Brown (1, 3, 4, 7, 8)
- Carl Burnett (1)
- Jeff Carruthers (2, 3, 6, 9)
- Darrell Smith (8)

== Production ==
- Paul Brown – producer, recording, mixing
- Jeff Carruthers – co-producer (2, 3)
- Stephen Marcussen – mastering at Precision Mastering (Hollywood, California)
- Christine Caro – art direction, design
- Andrea Marouk – photography
- Tracy Lamonica – portrait artwork
- Howard Lowell – management
