= Boney James =

American saxophonist and songwriter

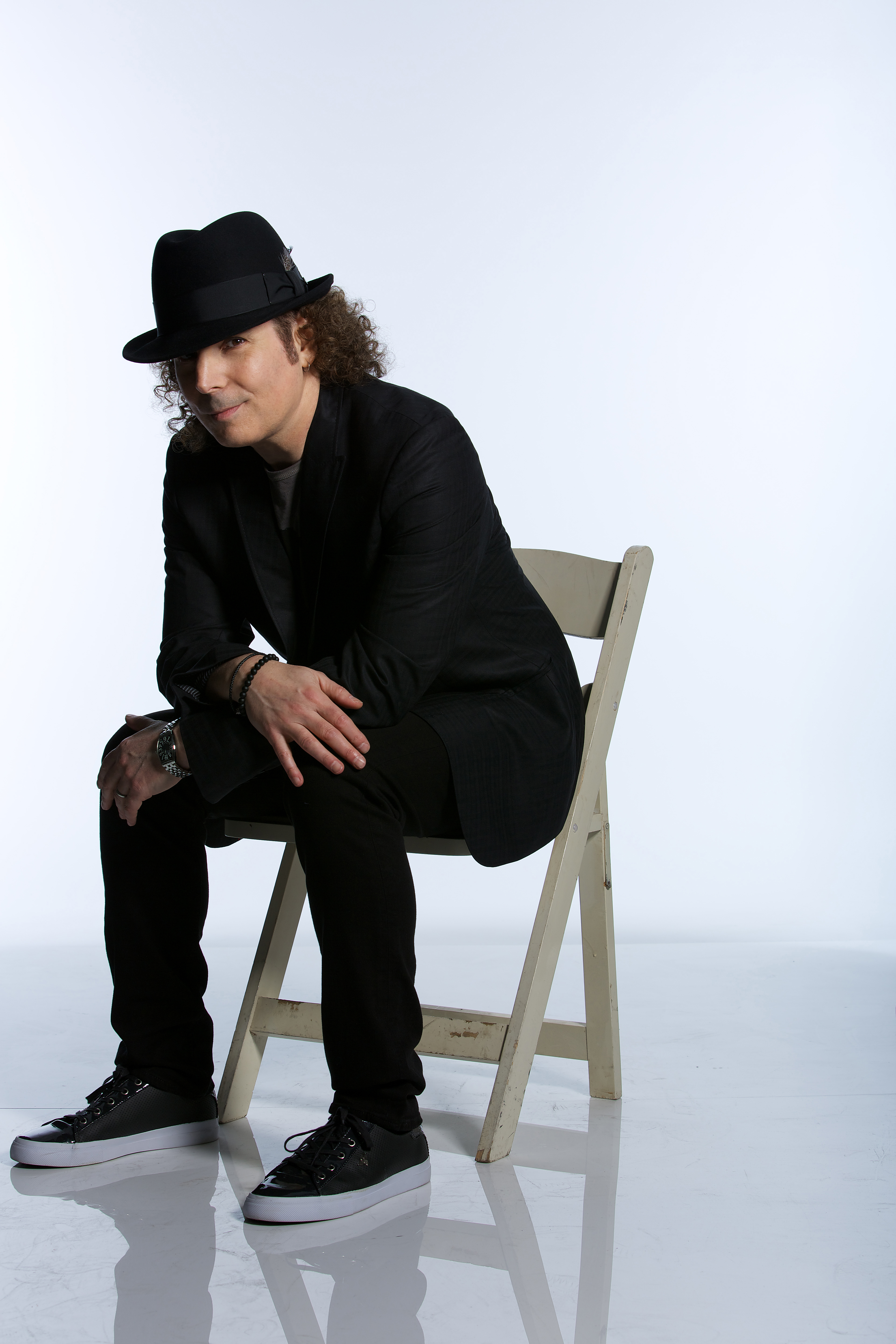
- Boney James in 2013

Background information
- Born: James Oppenheim; September 1, 1961 (age 65); Lowell, Massachusetts, U.S.
- Genres: Jazz, contemporary jazz, R&B
- Occupation: Musician
- Instrument: Saxophone
- Years active: 1970s–present
- Label: Concord
- Spouse: Lily Mariye (m. 1985)
- Website: boneyjames.com

Boney James (born James Oppenheim September 1, 1961) is an American saxophonist, recording artist, songwriter and record producer.

He is a four-time Grammy Award nominee (Best Pop Instrumental Album, 2001, 2004, 2014 and Best Traditional R&B Performance, 2009) and a Soul Train Award winner (Best Jazz Album 1998). He has also received three NAACP Image Award nominations for Best Jazz Album. James has sold over four million albums, and has accumulated four RIAA Certified Gold Records. In 2009, Billboard magazine named James one of the Top 3 Billboard Contemporary Jazz Artists of the Decade. In 2024 James became the first artist to notch 20 No. 1 singles on the Billboard magazine SJ Chart.

== Biography ==
Born in Lowell, Massachusetts, James took up the clarinet at the age of eight, switching to sax when he was ten. James spent his early teen years in New Rochelle, New York. He became musically influenced by the R&B Motown genre and saxophonist Grover Washington, Jr. When he was fourteen his family moved to Los Angeles, where he joined a fusion band that opened for acts like Flora Purim and the Yellowjackets. Another member of this early band was John Shanks, now a successful pop producer and guitarist with Bon Jovi. James eventually received a degree in history from UCLA, but began playing music full-time after graduation. James learned to play keyboards and in 1985 he joined Morris Day's band. His R&B influence was further strengthened by seven years of touring and sessions as a sideman with Day, The Isley Brothers, Bobby Caldwell, Randy Crawford, Teena Marie and others. It was on the road with Crawford in 1986 that he earned his now-famous moniker, when his physique led a bandmate to joke "We'll have to start calling you 'Boney' James!"

In the early 1990s, while on tour with Bobby Caldwell's band, he met engineer and producer Paul Brown, beginning a 10-year period of collaboration. In 1992 he released his debut album as a leader, Trust, on the independent record label Spindletop Records. Following the record's success, he was signed by the Warner Brothers label in 1994, on which he released the RIAA Certified Gold Records Seduction, Sweet Thing and Body Language albums.

In 2000 he collaborated with trumpeter Rick Braun on an album called Shake it Up. Their duets include the now classic updated version of Hugh Masakela's "Grazin' in the Grass". Other artists who have made guest appearances on Boney's records include October London, Lalah Hathaway, Raheem DeVaughn, Faith Evans, George Benson, George Duke, Dwele, Al Jarreau, Philip Bailey, Anthony Hamilton, Jaheim, Eric Benét, Dave Hollister, Stokley Williams, Avery*Sunshine, Kenny Lattimore and Angie Stone.

James began co-producing his records with Brown in 1997, and assumed the role of sole producer starting with his Grammy-nominated Pure album in 2003. Following a string of chart-topping albums, in 2006 James moved to Concord Records and released Shine which posted his highest Billboard Pop Chart positions to that date (No. 44 on the Top 200). His 2009 album, Send One Your Love earned him a Grammy nomination for Best Traditional R&B Performance. His 2013 album The Beat received a Grammy nomination for Best Pop Instrumental Album.

Returning home from a concert performance on May 15, 2010, his car was rear ended by a drunk driver, causing him a fractured jaw, two shattered teeth and facial lacerations which sidelined his career for two months.

In 2014, he produced two songs on Al Jarreau's George Duke tribute album My Old Friend, "No Rhyme No Reason" (feat. Kelly Price) and "Bring Me Joy" (feat. George Duke).

In 2015, he released futuresoul which spent eleven weeks at No. 1 on the Billboard Contemporary Jazz Chart and was the best selling Contemporary Jazz Record of 2015. In August 2015, James made his first appearance on The Tonight Show Starring Jimmy Fallon.

2017 saw the release of Honestly, his sixteenth album, which became his eleventh No. 1 on the Billboard Jazz Albums Chart. It also reached No. 22 on the Billboard Current Albums Chart, his highest pop chart debut to date.

June 2020 he released his seventeenth studio album Solid, describing it as "a reaction to how stressful the world feels these days. Music is a respite, it’s always ‘solid’ and never lets me down." The CD broke his previous Pop Chart record, debuting at No. 10 on the Billboard Top Albums Chart. His eighteenth album Detour was released on September 23, 2022.

== Personal life ==
James is married to actress and director Lily Mariye and in 2012 he contributed an original score to her directorial feature film debut, Model Minority.

== Discography ==
=== Studio albums ===
Year	Album	Label
1992	Trust	Spindletop
1994	Backbone	Warner Bros.
1995	Seduction	Warner Bros.
1997	Sweet Thing	Warner Bros.
1999	Body Language	Warner Bros.
2001	Ride	Warner Bros.
2004	Pure	Warner Bros.
2006	Shine	Concord
2009	Send One Your Love	Concord
2011	Contact	Verve
2013	The Beat	Concord
2015	Futuresoul	Concord
2017	Honestly	Concord
2020	Solid	Concord
2022	Detour	Concord
2024	Slow Burn	Concord
2026	A Simple Man	Concord

=== Collaboration albums ===
Year	Album	Label
2000	Shake It Up – (with Rick Braun)	Warner Bros.

=== Holiday albums ===
Year	Album	Label
1996	Boney's Funky Christmas	Warner Bros.
2007	Christmas Present	Concord
2025	'Tis the Season	Concord

=== Score contributions ===
Year	Album	Label
2000	The Shangri-la Café	Nice Girl
2012	Model Minority	Nice Girl

=== Singles ===
Year	Title	Peak chart positions		Album	Ref.
Year	Title	Smooth Jazz Airplay	Adult R&B Airplay	Album	Ref.
Year	Title	pk^{wks}		Album	Ref.
2005	"2:01 A.M."	12^{1}	—	Pure	
2006	"The Total Experience" (featuring George Duke)	1^{4}	—	Shine	
2007	"Hypnotic"	1^{3}	—	Shine	
2008	"Skating"	27^{1}	—	Christmas Present	
2008	"The First Noel" (featuring Rick Braun)	29^{1}	—	Christmas Present	
2008	"Let It Go"	1^{3}	—	Shine	
2008	"The Way She Walks"	17^{4}	—	Shine	
2009	"Stop, Look, Listen"	1^{8}	—	Send One Your Love	
2009	"Send One Your Love"	5^{2}	—	Send One Your Love	
2010	"Touch"	6^{1}	—	Send One Your Love	
2010	"I'll Be Good to You"	30^{1}	—	Send One Your Love	
2011	"Contact"	1^{5}	—	Contact	
2011	"Spin"	1^{4}	—	Contact	
2012	"Cry"	2^{1}	—	Contact	
2012	"Deep Time"	10^{1}	—	Contact	
2013	"Batucada (The Beat)" (featuring Rick Braun)	1^{8}	—	The Beat	
2013	"Powerhouse"	1^{2}	—	The Beat	
2014	"Don't You Worry 'bout a Thing"	2^{1}	—	The Beat	
2014	"Sunset Boulevard"	4^{4}	—	The Beat	
2015	"Drumline"	1^{6}	—	Futuresoul	
2015	"Vinyl"	1^{2}	—	Futuresoul	
2016	"A Little Attitude"	1^{1}	—	Futuresoul	
2016	"Futuresoul"	14^{1}	—	Futuresoul	
2017	"Tick Tock"	1^{4}	—	Honestly	
2018	"On the Prowl"	1^{3}	—	Honestly	
2018	"Up All Night"	1^{4}	—	Honestly	
2019	"Kicks"	15^{1}	—	Honestly	
2020	"Solid"	1^{1}	—	Solid	
2020	"Full Effect"	1^{2}	—	Solid	
2021	"Tonic"	12^{1}	—	Solid	
2021	"Sundance"	1^{1}	—	Solid	
2022	"Bring It Back" (featuring Dontae Winslow)	1^{1}	—	Detour	
2022	"Coastin'" (featuring Lalah Hathaway)	—	17^{1}	Detour	
2023	"Detour"	6^{3}	—	Detour	
2023	"Memphis"	2^{1}	—	Detour	
2024	"All I Want Is You" (featuring October London)	23^{2}	—	Slow Burn	
2024	"Slide"	1^{3}	—	Slow Burn	
2025	"Sugar" (featuring Rick Braun)	2^{1}	—	Slow Burn	
2025	"The Bounce"	1^{1}	—	Slow Burn	
2026	"I Belong to You" (featuring Ledisi)	—	10^{1}	A Simple Man	
2026	"Storybook" (featuring Larry Carlton)	1^{2}	—	A Simple Man	
"—" denotes a recording that did not chart.

=== Collaborations ===
Year	Artist	Title	Peak chart positions		Album	Label	Ref.
Year	Artist	Title	Smooth Jazz Airplay	Adult R&B Airplay	Album	Label	Ref.
Year	Artist	Title	pk^{wks}		Album	Label	Ref.
2005	Ledisi	"My Sensitivity (Gets in the Way)"	—	18^{1}	Forever, for Always, for Luther	GRP	
2012	Jonathan Fritzén	"Magical"	1^{3}	—	Magical	Nordic Night	
2014	Al Jarreau (featuring George Duke)	"Bring Me Joy"	5^{1}	—	My Old Friend: Celebrating George Duke	Concord	
2018	Brian Simpson	"Persuasion"	23^{1}	—	Persuasion	Shanachie	
2019	Peabo Bryson	"Looking for Sade"	27^{1}	—	Stand for Love	Perspective	
2024	Big Mike Hart	"Cigar Lounge"	1^{3}	—	Modern Classic	Rhythm Section	
"—" denotes a recording that did not chart.
