= Lily Mariye =

American actress and filmmaker

- Born: September 25, 1964 (age 61); Las Vegas, Nevada, United States
- Spouse: Boney James (m. 1985)
- Website: http://www.lilymariye.net/

Lily Mariye (born September 25, 1964) is an American television director, filmmaker and actress.

== Early life ==
Mariye was born in Las Vegas, Nevada and graduated from UCLA with a BA in theater arts.

== Career ==
From 1994 to 2009 she had a regular role as nurse Lily Jarvik on the NBC television series ER. She has appeared in many films such as The Best Little Whorehouse in Texas, Mighty Joe Young, The Shadow, The New Age, The Doctor and Extraordinary Measures. Mariye has guest-starred in over 25 television shows including Teen Wolf, Criminal Minds, Shameless, NCIS: Los Angeles, Judging Amy, Ally McBeal, Family Ties, Star Trek: Deep Space Nine and Chicago Hope. She is also an award-winning theatre actress, performing in New York, Los Angeles and other regional theatres around the country.

Mariye's debut feature film as a writer and director, Model Minority had its world premiere at the 2012 Los Angeles Asian Pacific Film Festival, where it received three awards: Special Jury Outstanding Director, Breakthrough Performance by a New Actor and Outstanding Cinematography as well as being a nominee for the Grand Jury Prize in Narrative Feature Filmmaking. Model Minority also won Best Micro-Budget Film and Best Female Director at The London Independent Film Festival, and Outstanding Feature at The Sacramento International Film Festival.

She has written several full-length screenplays, one of which, The Shangri-la Cafe, was accepted into the second round of the application process for development in the Sundance Feature Film Labs. The Shangri-la Cafe won Best Screenplay at the Ohio International Independent Film Festival and the Gaffers Film Festival, and won her a grant from the AFI Conservatory's prestigious Directing Workshop for Women, 13th Cycle. While at AFI she produced and directed an award-winning short film version of the script (Best Short Film Award - Moondance International Film Festival, Best Screenplay Award - Brussels Independent Film Festival). The short film version of The Shangri-la Cafe was included on a DVD release of AFI shorts entitled Celebrating AFI.

In 2012, Mariye was chosen to participate in the Disney/ABC/DGA Directing Program.

In 2016, she directed Episode 14, Season 4 of ABC's Nashville and season 5, episode 14 after the show moved to CMT. She also directed an episode of Season 2 of Amazon's Just Add Magic and episode 17, Season 4 of Freeform's The Fosters.

In 2016, she participated in The CBS Directing Initiative.

In 2017, Mariye directed episodes of Chicago P.D., NCIS: Los Angeles and helmed her third episode on Nashville.

In 2018 Mariye directed two episodes of CBS's Criminal Minds, Chicago P.D., NCIS: Los Angeles, MacGyver and The Enemy Within.

In 2018 she received a DGA Award Nomination at the 70th Annual DGA Awards for Outstanding Directorial Achievement in Children's Program for her work on Just Add Magic.

Mariye also received the Visionary Award from East West Players in April 2018 for her contributions in raising "the visibility of the Asian Pacific American (APA) community through [her] craft."

== Personal life ==
A resident of Los Angeles, Mariye lives with her husband, saxophonist Boney James.

== Directing credits ==
=== Film ===
Year	Title	Director	Writer	Producer	Notes
2000	The Shangri-la Café	Yes	Yes	Yes	Short film
2002	Err	Yes	No	No	Short film
2003	Thumbing It	Yes	No	No	Short film
2012	Model Minority	Yes	Yes	Yes	Feature film

=== Television ===
Year	Title	Notes
2016–2018	Nashville	3 episodes
2017–2019	Chicago P.D.	2 episodes
2017	The Fosters	Episode: “Diamond in the Rough”
2017	Just Add Magic	Episode: “Just Add Meddling”; DGA Award Nomination
2018	Criminal Minds	2 episodes
2018–2019	NCIS: Los Angeles	4 episodes
2018–2020	MacGyver	2 episodes
2019	The Enemy Within	Episode: “Homecoming”
2019	The Terror: Infamy	Episode: “Shatter Like a Pearl”
2019	How to Get Away with Murder	Episode: “I'm the Murderer”
2019	Stumptown	Episode: “Dex Education”
2020	Prodigal Son	Episode: “The Professionals”
2020	Council of Dads	Episode: “Tradition!”
2021	The Walking Dead: World Beyond	2 episodes
2022	Promised Land	Episode: “La Cosecha (The Harvest)”
2022	The Walking Dead	Episode: “Trust”
2022	Partner Track	2 episodes
2022	The Good Fight	Episode: “The End of Ginni”
2023	Invitation to a Bonfire	2 episodes; series unscreened
2023–2025	Godfather of Harlem	3 episodes
2025	Elsbeth	Episode: “I’ve Got a Little List”

=== Theatre ===
Year	Title	Playwright	Notess
2017	"God of Carnage"	Yasmina Reza	East West Players Theatre

== Acting credits ==
=== Film ===
Year	Title	Role	Notes
1982	The Best Little Whorehouse in Texas	Chicken Ranch Girl	
1985	American Geisha	Shizue	TV Movie
1987	Right to Die	Unknown	TV Movie
1991	Switch	Nurse	
1991	The Doctor	O.R. Nurse	
1991	Ted & Venus	Rose	
1992	Exclusive	Doctor	TV Movie
1994	The Shadow	Mrs. Tam	
1994	The New Age	Sue	
1994	Roseanne & Tom: Behind the Scenes	Secretary	TV Movie
1998	Mighty Joe Young	Ticket Clerk	
2005	American Pie Presents: Band Camp	Dr. Susan Choi	
2010	Extraordinary Measures	Dr. Waldman	

=== Television series ===
Year	Title	Role	Notes
1982	Lou Grant	Judy	Episode: “Unthinkable”
1982	Fame	Dr. Chen	Episode: “Childhood's End”
1982	Knots Landing	Nurse	Episode: “Emergency”
1984	Family Ties	Eleanor	Episode: “Best Man”
1985	Remington Steele	Teller #1	Episode: “Have I Got a Steele for You”
1985	St. Elsewhere	Nurse Sherry Long	Episode: “Slice O’Life
1986	Disneyland	Teacher #3	Episode: “Fuzzbucket”
1988	Disneyland	Commentator	Episode: “Justin Case”
1988	Murphy Brown	Secretary #6	Episode: “Nowhere to Run”
1989	Jake and the Fatman	Mrs. DeLuca	Episode: “Easy to Love”
1989	China Beach	Servant	Episode: “Independence Day”
1991	Back to the Future	(voice)	Episode: “Brothers”
1991	Who's the Boss?	Nurse	Episode: “Tony Bags a Big One”
1992	Rachel Gunn, R.N.	Registrar	Episode: “My Left Feet”
1993	Star Trek: Deep Space Nine	Ops Officer	Episode: “Emissary”
1993	Bob	Sishu	Episode: “The Phantom of AmCanTranConComCo”
1993	George	Reporter #3	Episode: “Nobody Up There Likes Me”
1994–2009	ER	Nurse Lily Jarvik	127 episodes
1995	Signs and Wonders	Agent Sung	3 episodes
1995–1996	Melrose Place	Dr. Fisher	2 episodes
1996	Chicago Hope	Kayoko Miyamoto	Episode: “V-Fibbing”
2002	Ally McBeal	Dr. Franklin	Episode: “Homecoming”
2005	Judging Amy	Dr. Clara Kim	Episode: “You Don't Know Me”
2011	Shameless	Malaya	Episode: “Killer Carl”
2013	NCIS: Los Angeles	Ashley Hong	Episode: “Purity”
2014	Teen Wolf	Satomi Ito	3 episodes
2014	Criminal Minds	Dr. Lee	Episode: “X”
2015	General Hospital	Madame Bellot	1 episode
2016	Murder in the First	Beth Crotty	Episode: “Black and Blue”
2016	One Mississippi	Doctor	Episode: “New Contact”
2018	NCIS: Los Angeles	Shirley Hidoko	Episode: “Superhuman”

=== Theatre ===
Year	Title	Role	Director	Location	Notes
1987; 1988; 1991	Tea	Teruko	Julianne Boyd	Manhattan Theatre Club, NY; Old Globe Theatre, San Diego; Odyssey Theatre, LA	Dramalogue Award
1990	Delicacies	Unknown	Bruce Whitney	Carpet Co. Stage	
1992	Into the Woods	Unknown	DTim Dang	East West Players	
1995	Trojan Women	Unknown	Michael Arabian	CBS Studios Center	
1996	Kokoro (True Heart)	Yasako	Jan Lewis	Odyssey Theatre	LA Weekly Best Actress nomination
Unknown	Runaways	Unknown	Matt Casella	Richmond Shepard	
Unknown	The Bacchae	Unknown	Unknown	Mark Taper Workshop	
Unknown	Pastorale	Unknown	Susan Dietz	Beverly Hills Playhouse	
Unknown	Cabaret	Unknown	John Allison	Glendale Playhouse	
Unknown	Kimchee & Chitlins	Unknown	Unknown	Mark Taper Workshop	
Unknown	Daniel in Babylon	Unknown	Matt Casella	L.A. Stage Co.	
Unknown	Lesbian Seagulls	Unknown	Catherine Coke	Celebration Theatre, L.A.	
