= Tim Carmon =

American keyboard player

Tim Carmon is an American keyboard player. He was born a preacher's son in Washington, D.C. Carmon grew up immersed in the church. He began playing piano in the fourth grade and by the age of 12 was organist for three different churches, including his father's. His career led him to California. Carmon became known for his musical versatility. At sessions, this quickly placed him in great demand by artists in a variety of genres.

The roster of musicians with whom Carmon has performed, toured, written or produced is lengthy: Eric Clapton, Babyface, Stevie Wonder, Paul McCartney, Queen Latifah, Marcus Miller, Sheryl Crow, Bob Dylan, Gladys Knight, B.B. King, Jamie Foxx, Earth, Wind & Fire, Carlos Santana, Herbie Hancock, Michael McDonald, Mary J. Blige, David Sanborn and more.

In addition to playing keyboards, Carmon is a drummer, singer and music producer. He is an alumnus of the Duke Ellington School of Arts. Carmon worked with Eric Clapton on MTV's Babyface Unplugged and joined Clapton's touring band for the 1998 Pilgrim Tour. Additionally, he joined Clapton and B.B. King in the studio for the Riding With The King sessions in February 2000.

Carmon continues to be in demand. Most recently, he provided arrangements, piano and keyboards for the film adaptation of Dreamgirls with R&B producers, The Underdogs, and he took part in the 50-year-old revision of "Lady Sings the Blues". Carmon re-joined Clapton's touring band briefly for some US dates in 2004 when he substituted for Billy Preston, who was ill. More recently, Carmon was on the road with Clapton for the 2006 / 2007 World Tour. He joined Clapton's band for a 14-date Ireland / UK tour with performances in Dublin, Liverpool, Manchester and an 11-night residency at London's Royal Albert Hall in May 2009.
