= Groovology =

Studio album by Gerald Albright
- Released: June 18, 2002
- Studios: Bright Music Studios (Moonpark, California); EMI Studios (Santa Monica, California); Cardraygee Studios (Oak Park, California); JHL Sound (Malibu, California); Funky Joint Studios (Sherman Oaks, California)
- Genre: Jazz
- Length: 46:17
- Label: GRP
- Producers: Gerald Albright; Luther "Mano" Hanes; Marvin McQuitty; Gregory Curtis; Jeff Lorber; Paul Brown

Gerald Albright chronology
Pleasures of the Night with Will Downing (1998)	Groovology (2002)	Kickin' It You (2004)

Groovology is the eighth studio album by Gerald Albright, released in 2002 on GRP Records. This album reached No. 4 on the Billboard Top Contemporary Jazz Albums chart and No. 5 on the Billboard Top Jazz Albums chart.

== Overview ==
Groovology was produced by Gerald Albright. Guest artists such as Sheila E., Chuckii Booker, Bobby Lyle and Ricky Lawson appeared on the album.

== Critical reception ==
Professional ratings
Review scores
Source	Rating
AllMusic	4/5 stars
Atlanta Journal Constitution	(B)
Los Angeles Times	3/5 stars

Sonia Murray of the Atlanta Journal Constitution, in a B review remarked, "on Albright's "Groovology," he reworks the Babyface-Eric Clapton collaboration "Change the World"—particularly the bridge—into something reminiscent of Brothers Johnson funk."

With a 4/5 star rating, Paula Edelstein of AllMusic claimed, "Gerald Albright offers his listeners ten fresh musical concepts on his GRP label debut entitled Groovology, and they are musical concepts that have not been done to death." She added "Excellent solos, vocals, and supportive arrangements make this one a keeper for Gerald Albright fans."

Peter Bacon of the Birmingham Post noted, "Radio-friendly jazz/R'n'B from California, courtesy of the saxophonist Gerald Albright. The sound and style of this kind of easy listening stuff hasn't really changed since the 1970s, and why should it?...Albright packs in all the right ingredients, funky synth bass, chunking guitars, tight blasts of horn backings, and highly vocalised alto saxophone snaking around in the spotlight."

Don Heckman of the Los Angeles Times, in a 3/5 star review found, "Albright has produced an album that is a well-wrapped package of jazz and rhythm & blues elements that should have no difficulty appealing to its target audience. Beyond its sales appeal, the album is a tour de force for Albright, who leaps from saxophones, woodwinds, keyboards and percussion to background vocalist."

== Track listing ==
No.	Title	Writer(s)	Length
1.	"Old School Jam"	Gerald Albright	04:25
2.	"Groovology"	Gerald Albright, Marvin McQuitty	04:47
3.	"Bring a Li'l Love"	Greg Curtis	03:42
4.	"Ain't No Stoppin'"	Gerald Albright, Jeff Lorber	04:19
5.	"Change the World"	Gordon Kennedy, Wayne Kirkpatrick, Tommy Sims	05:02
6.	"I Will Always Love You"	Gerald Albright, Fred Hammond, Luther "Mano" Hanes	05:09
7.	"The Next Level"	Gerald Albright	04:43
8.	"I Need You"	Terrell Carter, Chuck Cymone	03:59
9.	"Don't Hold Back"	Gerald Albright	04:22
10.	"We Fall Down"	Kyle Matthews	05:49

== Personnel ==
Musicians

- Gerald Albright – alto saxophone, tenor saxophone, keyboards, bass guitar, drum programming, horn arrangements (2), arrangements (5)
- Chuckii Booker – keyboards (1, 9)
- Luther "Mano" Hanes – keyboards (2, 6), drum sequencing (6)
- Gregory Curtis – keyboards (3), drum programming (3)
- Jeff Lorber – keyboards (4), drum programming (4)
- Bobby Lyle – keyboards (5, 7)
- Tim Carmon – organ (5), keyboards (10)
- Chuck Cymone – keyboards (8), drum programming (8)
- David Delhomme – keyboards (9)
- Paul Jackson Jr. – electric guitar (1, 9), acoustic guitar (5), acoustic guitar solo (6)
- Joey Woolfolk – electric guitar (2)
- Paul Pesco – electric guitar (4)
- Maurice Fitzgerald – bass guitar (2)
- Raymond McKinley – bass guitar (6)
- Ricky Lawson – drums (1, 5, 7, 9)
- Marvin McQuitty – drums (2, 6, 10), drum programming (2)
- Sheila E. – percussion (7, 9)

Vocalists

- Gregory Curtis – lead vocals (3), backing vocals (3)
- Chris Walker – lead vocals (3), backing vocals (3)
- Briana Martin – backing vocals (3)
- Luther "Mano" Hanes – backing vocals (5, 6), vocal arrangements (5)
- Terrell Carter – lead vocals (8), backing vocals (8)
- Christopher Bolton – backing vocals (10)
- Lynn Davis – backing vocals (10)
- Lynne Fiddmont-Linsey – backing vocals (10)
- Kenya Hathaway – backing vocals (10)
- Lisa Vaughn – backing vocals (10)
- Lamont Van Hook – backing vocals (10)

== Production ==
- Gerald Albright – producer (1, 5–7, 9, 10)
- Luther "Mano" Hanes – producer (2, 6)
- Marvin McQuitty – producer (2)
- Gregory Curtis – producer (3)
- Jeff Lorber – producer (4)
- Paul Brown – producer (8)
- Jeff Newcott – release coordinator
- Kelly Pratt – release coordinator
- Hollis King – art direction
- Gravillis Inc. – design
- Rocky Schenck – photography
- Steve Chapman, Susie Major, Ron Moss and Yvonne Wish for Chapman Management – management

Technical credits

- Steve Hall – mastering at Future Disc (Hollywood, California)
- Gerald Albright – recording (1, 2, 5–7, 9, 10), mixing (1, 2, 5–7, 9, 10)
- Anthony Jeffries – recording (1–3, 5–7, 9, 10), mixing (1–7, 9, 10)
- Gregory Curtis – recording (3), mixing (3)
- Jeff Lorber – recording (4)
- Paul Brown – recording (8), mixing (8)

== Charts ==
Chart performance for Groovology
Chart (2002)	Peak position
US Top Jazz Albums (Billboard)	5
US Top Contemporary Jazz Albums (Billboard)	4
US Heatseekers Albums (Billboard)	28
