= Smooth (Gerald Albright album) =

Studio album by Gerald Albright
- Released: 1994
- Studios: Aire L.A. (Glendale, California); Bright (Moorpark, California)
- Genres: R&B; jazz
- Length: 54:42
- Label: Atlantic
- Producers: Gerald Albright; Arvel McClinton; Chuckii Booker; Travon Potts

Gerald Albright chronology
Dream Come True (1991)	Smooth (1994)	Giving Myself to You (1995)

Smooth is the fourth studio album by the American musician Gerald Albright, released in 1994 on Atlantic Records. The album peaked at No. 25 on the Billboard Top R&B Albums chart and No. 2 on both the Billboard Jazz Albums and Contemporary Jazz Albums charts.

== Production ==
Albright strove to create an R&B album; in addition to saxophone, he also played flute and keyboards. Vesta Williams, Lalah Hathaway, and Will Downing are among the many vocalists on the album. Howard Hewett sang on the cover of "This Is for the Lover in You". Stanley Clarke played bass on "Sedona". The liner notes were written by Magic Johnson.

== Critical reception ==
Professional ratings
Review scores
Source	Rating
AllMusic	3/5 stars
The Charlotte Observer	4/4 stars
The Encyclopedia of Popular Music	3/5 stars
Los Angeles Times	2/4 stars
MusicHound R&B: The Essential Album Guide	3/5 stars

The Los Angeles Times wrote that "Albright offers predictably melodic, safe solos that, for the most part, fail to engage the listener." The Daily Breeze determined that Albright "turns in softly percussive, overly slick readings of soul-jazz mood pieces... He ignores chances to improvise or offer inventive ideas." The Charlotte Observer deemed the album "Albright's breakthrough work," writing that "it's obvious Albright has put a lot of energy into this effort." The Buffalo News considered the music "full of slinky rhythms, gossamer textures and sensuous, lazy melodies."

AllMusic called the album "a tasty if somewhat typical journey through the land of quiet storm and light funk."

== Accolades ==
Smooth was nominated for a Soul Train Music Award for "Best Jazz Album".

== Track listing ==
No.	Title	Writer(s)	Length
1.	"Don't Worry About It"	Gerald Albright	4:33
2.	"I Surrender"	Albright	5:.50
3.	"Sweet Baby"	Albright, Arvel McClinton	5:11
4.	"This Is for the Lover in You"	Howard Hewett, Dana Meyers	4:44
5.	"G & Lee"	Albright	6:31
6.	"Just 2 B with You"	Albright, Chuckii Booker	5:08
7.	"Anniversary"	Raphael Saadiq, Carl Wheeler	4:33
8.	"Passion"	Albright, Travon Potts	6:21
9.	"Sedona"	Albright, Potts	5:36
10.	"Say It with Feeling"	Albright	5:36

== Personnel ==
Musicians

- Gerald Albright – tenor saxophone (1, 2, 10), keyboards (1, 2, 10), bass guitar (1, 2, 6), drum programming (2), EWI (2, 10), alto saxophone (3–5, 7–9), flute (4), soprano saxophone (5, 6)
- Chuckii Booker – keyboards (1–4, 6, 7), drum programming (1, 4, 6, 7)
- Arvel McClinton – keyboards (3), drum programming (3)
- Patrick Moten – keyboards (5, 10)
- Derek Nakamoto – strings (5, 9, 10)
- Travon Potts – keyboards (8, 9), drum programming (8, 9)
- Greg Phillinganes – keyboards (9)
- Paul Jackson Jr. – guitars (1, 2, 10), rhythm guitar (5)
- Lee Ritenour – lead guitar (5)
- Melvin Lee Davis – bass guitar (5)
- Stanley Clarke – piccolo bass solo (9)
- Freddie Washington – bass (10)
- Land Richards – drums (9, 10)

Vocalists

- Vesta Williams – featured vocals (1), backing vocals (1)
- Pattie Howard – backing vocals (1)
- Olivia McClurkin – backing vocals (1)
- Alfie Silas – backing vocals (1)
- Lalah Hathaway – featured vocals (2), backing vocals (2)
- Arvel McClinton – backing vocals (3)
- Howard Hewett – backing vocals (4)
- Will Downing – featured vocals (6), backing vocals (6)
- Chuckii Booker – backing vocals (7)

Production

- Raymond A. Shields II – executive producer, management
- Gerald Albright – producer
- Arvel McClinton – producer (3)
- Chuckii Booker – producer (7)
- Travon Potts – producer (8, 9)
- Kevin D. Lewis – production coordinator
- Elizabeth Barrett – art direction
- Louise O'Brien – photography
- Daniel Schridde – photography
- Lisa Michelle – styling
- Ron Graves – hair
- Merc Arceneaux – make-up
- Magic Johnson – liner notes

Technical credits

- Gerald Albright – recording (1, 3, 6, 7), assistant engineer (1–3, 5, 6, 8–10)
- Kevin Kadel – recording (1, 2, 4–6, 8–10), mixing (6)
- Anthony Jefferies – mixing (1–5, 7), recording (5, 9, 10)
- Dave Pensado – mixing (8)
- Craig Burbidge – mixing (9, 10)
- Ray Silva – assistant engineer
