= Sax for Stax =

Studio album by Gerald Albright
- Released: June 24, 2008
- Recorded: Unknown
- Studio: Castle Oaks Productions (Calabasas, California); KAR Studios (Sherman Oaks, California); Bright Music Studios (Moonpark, California); CCI Media (Torrance, California); The Green Room (London, UK)
- Genre: Jazz
- Length: 51:10
- Label: Peak Records
- Producer: Gerald Albright; Rex Rideout

Gerald Albright chronology
New Beginnings (2006)	Sax for Stax (2008)	Pushing the Envelope (2010)

Professional ratings
Review scores
Source	Rating
AllMusic	(favourable)
Jazz Times	(favourable)

Sax for Stax is the thirteenth studio album by saxophonist Gerald Albright issued in 2008 by Peak Records. The album rose to No. 4 on the Billboard Contemporary Jazz Albums chart, No. 7 on the Billboard Jazz Albums chart and No. 24 on the Billboard Top R&B/Hip-Hop Albums chart.

== Critical reception ==
Anthony Tognazzini of AllMusic exclaimed, "On 2008's SAX FOR STAX, Albright returns to his personal and professional roots, offering up tasty interpretations of classic Stax/Volt soul sides... Laid back and mellow, Albright's tribute to Stax is designed to go down smooth."

Brian Soergel of JazzTimes noted, "Stax, of course, had and still has a gritty rep that contrasted with rival Motown's sweet soul music. Albright, a veteran, conveys that style to maximum effect while clearly enjoying the contemporary sounds he's known for."

== Accolades ==
Sax for Stax was nominated for Best Pop Instrumental Album at the 51st Annual Grammy Awards in 2009.

== Track listing ==
1. "Theme from "The Men"" (Isaac Hayes) - 5:08
2. "Knock on Wood" (Eddie Floyd, Steve Cropper) -4:04
3. "Never Can Say Goodbye" (Clifton Davis) - 4:17 (Featuring Will Downing)
4. "Memphis Passion" (Gerald Albright) - 4:54
5. "Respect Yourself" (Luther Ingram, Mack Rice) - 5:05 (featuring Ledisi)
6. "I Stand Accused" (William Butler, Jerry Butler) - 5:11
7. "Cheaper to Keep Her" (Mack Rice) - 4:22
8. "Walkin' Down Beale Street" (Gerald Albright) - 4:30
9. "What You See Is What You Get" (Tony Hester) - 4:50 (featuring Philip Bailey)
10. "Who's Making Love?" (Bettye Crutcher, Don Davis, Homer Banks, Raymond Jackson) - 4:16
11. "W.C. Handy Hop" (Gerald Albright) - 4:36

== Personnel ==
Musicians

- Gerald Albright – alto saxophone, baritone saxophone, tenor saxophone, alto sax solo (1, 3, 4, 5, 8), flutes (1, 3, 4, 6), tenor sax solo (2, 6, 7, 9–11), bass guitar (4, 6, 8, 11), percussion programming (4, 11), vocal arrangements (6), horn arrangements (10)
- Tracy Carter – keyboards (1–3, 5, 7–11)
- Rex Rideout – keyboards (2, 5, 6, 9, 10)
- Arlington Jones – keyboards (4)
- Errol Cooney – guitars (1–3, 5, 7, 9, 10)
- Rick Watford – acoustic guitar (4), electric guitar (4), guitars (8, 11)
- Darrell Crooks – guitars (6)
- Melvin Lee Davis – bass (1–3, 5, 7, 9, 10)
- Teddy Campbell – drums
- Lenny Castro – percussion (1–3, 5–10)
- Kirk Whalum – tenor saxophone (8)
- Mark Cargill – strings (1, 3, 6, 9), string arrangements (1, 3, 6, 9)

Vocalists

- Will Downing – vocals (3)
- Ledisi – vocals (5)
- Selina Albright – backing vocals (6)
- Philip Bailey – vocals (9)
- Mabvuto Carpenter – additional backing vocals (9)

== Production ==
- Andi Howard – executive producer
- Mark Wexler – executive producer
- Gerald Albright – producer and arrangements (1, 3, 4, 7, 8, 11)
- Rex Rideout – producer and arrangements (2, 5, 6, 9, 10)
- Valerie Ince – label coordinator
- Yvonne Wish – project coordinator
- Sonny Mediana – cover design, package design
- Carl Studna – photography
- Larry Cooper – wardrobe
- George Duke – liner notes
- Ross Moss for Moss/Chapman and Co. Management, Inc. – management

Technical credits

- Eric Boulanger – mastering
- Sangwook "Sunny" Nam – mastering
- The Mastering Lab (Ojai, California) – mastering location
- Don Murray – mixing at G Studio Digital (Studio City, California) and The Firehouse (San Francisco, California)
- Gerald Albright – recording
- Marc Green – recording
- Rex Rideout – recording
- Steve Sykes – recording
- Josh Blanchard – assistant engineer
- Seth Presant – assistant engineer

== Charts ==
Chart performance for Sax for Stax
Chart (2008)	Peak position
US Billboard 200	9
US Top Jazz Albums (Billboard)	7
US Top R&B/Hip-Hop Albums (Billboard)	24
US Heatseekers Albums (Billboard)	9
