= Dreams Come True =

Dreams Come True or Dream Come True may refer to:

== Organizations ==
- Dreams Come True (British charity)
- Dreams Come True (American non-profit)

== Film and television ==
- Dreams Come True (film), a 1936 British musical film
- "Dreams Come True" (Glee), the final episode of TV series Glee

== Music ==
- Dreams Come True (band), a Japanese pop group

=== Albums ===
- Dreams Come True 2019, a 2019 remix EP by Black Dresses
- Dreams Come True, a 2012 EP by Heidi Montag
- Dreams Come True (CANT album), 2011
- Dreams Come True (Andrew Hill & Chico Hamilton album), 2008
- Dreams Come True, a 2006 album by Rosemary Vandenbroucke
- Dreams Come True (Judee Sill album), 2005
- Dreams Come True (Marcia Ball/LuAnn Barton/Angela Strehli), 1990
- Dream Come True (Gerald Albright album), 1990
- Dream Come True (A Flock of Seagulls album), 1985
- Dream Come True (Earl Klugh album), 1980
- Dream Come True (Nora Aunor and Tirso Cruz III album), 1971

=== Songs ===
- "Dreams Come True" (Hey! Say! JUMP song), 2008
- "Dreams Come True (S.E.S. song)", 1998, covered by Aespa in 2021
- Dream Come True (song), a 2025 song by Carly Pearce
- "Dreams Come True", a demo track by Kanye West of his 2004 single "All Falls Down"
- "Dreams Come True", a song by Brandon Flowers from The Desired Effect
- "Dream Come True", a song by Frozen Ghost from Nice Place to Visit
- "Dreams Come True", a song by HammerFall from Crimson Thunder
- "Dreams Come True", a song by Robert Palmer from Honey
- "Dream Come True", a song by Ta-Gana from the soundtrack of the 1998 film The Parent Trap
- "Dream Come True", a song by The Brand New Heavies from The Brand New Heavies
- "Dreams Come True", a song by Westlife from Coast to Coast
- "Dreams Come True", a song by Willie Nelson from It Always Will Be

== See also ==
- Never Had a Dream Come True (disambiguation)
