= Scumrun =

Annual charitable event

The Scumrun is an annual charitable event in the form of a road rally from the United Kingdom to mystery destinations around Europe. It has been running since 2006, originally as the Scumball 3000.

== Format of the event ==
Vehicles with a maximum purchase price of £500 – but often significantly upgraded by the teams of one or more drivers and passengers – are taken to a launch party in the UK before being taken by ferry to mainland Europe.

On each day a destination (plus, usually, intermediate checkpoints) is announced, but only to drivers who pass a breathalyser test to ensure their blood alcohol level is below the legal maximum to drive. At the end of each day those not driving in the morning participate in celebrations.

Much of the driving and celebrating is recorded for the purposes of producing a DVD which is used to encourage further teams to participate in future years. Media coverage is found in publications such as Fast Car and Men and Motors, highlighting the antics and money raised for much needed charities.

Communications are maintained between many of the cars using CB radios.

Typical vehicles include older BMW 5 and 7 Series, Mercedes-Benz W123 and W124 E-class and W126 S-class, Jaguar XJ models, and an assortment of Japanese sports cars. There have also been oddities such as black cab taxis and fire engines.

== Beneficiary charities ==
- 2006: The Sussex Snowdrop Trust (around £35,000 raised)
- 2007: Winston's Wish (around £50,000 raised)
- 2008: Whizz-Kidz (around £63,000 raised)
- 2009: CHASE hospice care for children (around £65,000 raised)
- 2010: CLIC Sargent (over £90,000 raised)
- 2011: Dreams Come True (around £80,000 raised)
- 2012: Sparks (Over £80,000 raised)
- 2013: WellChild
- 2014: Tommy's
- 2015: JDRF
- 2016: Action for A-T
- 2017: Together for Short Lives
- 2018: Action Medical Research

== Destinations ==
- 2008: Nevers, Luxembourg, Nürburg / Nürburgring, Amsterdam, return via Belgium
- 2009: Biganos, Pyrenees / Andorra (optional routes), Mataró, Millau Viaduct, Nonette, Puy-de-Dôme
- 2010: Amsterdam, Maastricht, Luxembourg, Nürburg / Nürburgring, Versailles, Paris
- 2011: Strasbourg, Nuremberg, Prague, Chemnitz, Vöhl, Bruges
- 2012: Le Mans, Clermont-Ferrand, Pau, Pamplona, Dune du Pilat
- 2013: Cologne, Hamelin, Berlin, Prague, Plzeň, Amberg, Stuttgart, Strasbourg, Champagne Region

== Organisational details ==
=== Name change ===
Scumball 3000 was the brainchild of Edward White (managing director) who created the event to assist National Children's charities in raising much needed funds to continue with the support they offer. The event provides a unique format that ensures the participants receive professional care and organisation throughout resulting in high repeat custom compared to similar events. Scumrun sells out each year and works closely with border crossing agencies as well as ferry operators to ensure the route is well planned and tested whilst providing support during the event itself to all participants where possible.

The name had to be changed from Scumball 3000 when the organisers of the Gumball 3000 complained, despite there being a clear distinction between the events with the Gumball 3000 involving extremely valuable sports cars and Scumrun based around cheap cars.

The Scumrun logo was trademarked following the name change and due to the popularity of the event the company have had to take the protection of their brand / event very seriously which sometimes includes legal advice in resolving conflicts from similar events.

== See also ==
- Mongol Rally, a similar (but much longer) light-hearted charity-fundraising driving event
