= New Beginnings (Gerald Albright album) =

Studio album by Gerald Albright
- Released: March 28, 2006
- Studio: JHL Sound (Pacific Palisades, California); Castle Oaks Studio (Calabasas, California); Riverphio Studios (Anaheim, California); KAR Studios and Da Crib Studio (Sherman Oaks, California)
- Genre: Jazz
- Length: 55:10
- Label: Peak Records
- Producer: Jeff Lorber; Gerald Albright; Rex Rideout; Chuckii Booker; Luther Hanes

Gerald Albright chronology
Kickin' It Up (2004)	New Beginnings (2006)	Sax for Stax (2008)

New Beginnings is an album by Gerald Albright. It was nominated for Best Pop Instrumental Album at the 49th Annual Grammy Awards in 2007 which became his first nomination in that category in his music career.

== Track listing ==
1. "We Got The Groove" (Gerald Albright, Jeff Lorber) - 4:07
2. "New Beginnings" (Albright) - 5:10
3. "Deep into My Soul" (Albright, Lorber) - 4:04
4. "And the Beat Goes On" - 4:36
5. "Georgia on My Mind" - 5:23
6. "Take Your Time" (Albright, Lorber) - 4:35
7. "I Want Somebody" (Albright, Chuckii Booker) - 4:28
8. "You Are My Love" (Albright, Luther Hanes) - 5:15
9. "Last But Not Least" (Albright) - 4:38
10. "I Need You" (Albright, Booker) - 3:53
11. "Big Shoes" (Albright, Lorber, Marion McClain) - 5:09
12. "Georgia on My Mind" (reprise) - 3:52

== Personnel ==
- Gerald Albright – alto saxophone, baritone saxophone (1, 10), tenor saxophone (1–7, 9–12), flute (1, 11), bass guitar (1, 4, 6, 11), arrangements
- Jeff Lorber – keyboards (1, 3, 6), guitars (1, 3, 6), arrangements (1, 3, 6, 11), drum programming (3, 6)
- Tracy Carter – keyboards (2, 5, 9, 12), arrangements (2, 5, 9, 12)
- Patrice Rushen – acoustic piano solo (2)
- Rex Rideout – keyboard programming (4), drum programming (4), arrangements (4)
- Chuckii Booker – keyboards (7, 10), drum programming (7, 10), arrangements (7, 10), backing vocals (10)
- Luther "Mano" Hanes – keyboards (8), backing vocals (8), arrangements (8)
- Paul Jackson Jr. – guitars (1, 3, 11)
- John "Jubu" Smith – guitars (2, 5, 12)
- Darrell Crooks – guitars (4)
- Rick Watford – guitars (8, 9)
- Marlon McClain – guitars (11)
- Melvin Lee Davis – bass guitar (2, 5, 12)
- Teddy Campbell – drums (1, 3, 6, 11)
- Anthony Moore – drums (2, 5, 12)
- Chris Botti – trumpet (11)
- Walter Scott – vocals (4)
- Wallace "Scotty" Scott – vocals (4)

== Production ==
- Andi Howard – executive producer
- Mark Wexler – executive producer
- Jeff Lorber – producer (1, 3, 6, 11)
- Gerald Albright – producer (2, 5, 9, 12)
- Rex Rideout – producer (4)
- Chuckii Booker – producer (7, 10)
- Luther "Mano" Hanes – producer (8)
- Sonny Mediana – art direction
- Carl Studna – photography
- Phil Collins – liner notes
- Chapman Management – management

Technical credits

- Steve Hall – mastering at Future Disc (Hollywood, California)
- Anthony Jeffries – mixing at The Music Group Studios (Van Nuys, California), engineer (2, 5, 12)
- Gerald Albright – engineer (1, 3, 4, 6, 7, 9–11)
- Jeff Lorber – engineer (1, 3, 6, 11)
- Dave Rideau – engineer (1, 3, 6, 11)
- Rex Rideout – engineer (4)
- Chuckii Booker – engineer (7, 10)
- Tracy Carter – engineer (9)

== Charts ==
Chart performance for New Beginnings
Chart (2006)	Peak position
US Top Contemporary Jazz Albums (Billboard)	1
US Heatseekers Albums (Billboard)	16
