= Chip Ritter =

American drummer

- Occupation(s): Drummer, musician
- Instrument: Drums
- Website: chipritter.com

Kristopher "Chip" Ritter is an author, drummer, musician, and entertainer. Perhaps, best known for his appearance and showmanship on The Late Show with David Letterman in 2004 where he juggled three drumsticks while playing the drums during his "Stupid Human Tricks" spotlight. Career highlights include becoming an author for Mel Bay Publications as well as being recognized on Drummerworld.com

As an active artist, Ritter has performed at drumming events including the 2007 Tiger Bill Drumbeat Festival in New Jersey, the 2008 Chicago Drum Show, the 2009 Hollywood Drum Show, and the 2010 Drummers for Jesus Festival in Dallas, Texas. Ritter has shared clinic rosters and stages with fellow artists including Aaron Spears, Calvin Rodgers, Gerald Heyward, Gorden Campbell, Marvin McQuitty, Nisan Stewart, Richie Gajate Garcia, Seth Davis, Teddy Campbell, and many others.

== Publications ==
- “The Ritter Method” - 2002
- “Stick Tricks” - 2006 ASIN B00127YRTA
- "The Pedal of Boom” - 2009 ASIN B002VRU6MW
- "Snare Force One - 2012 ISBN 0786684542
