= Live to Love =

Studio album by Gerald Albright
- Released: 1997
- Studio: Bright Music Studios (Moonpark, California); Aire L.A. Studios (Glendale, California); White Lightning Studios (Los Angeles, California)
- Genre: Jazz
- Length: 53:44
- Label: Atlantic
- Producer: Gerald Albright; Gordon Campbell; David Delhomme; Steve Harvey; Jacques Richmond; Marc Scarborough; Michael White

Gerald Albright chronology
Giving Myself to You (1995)	Live to Love (1997)	Pleasures of the Night with Will Downing (1997)

Live to Love is the sixth studio album by Gerald Albright. It was produced by Albright and released in 1997 by Atlantic Records. Live to Love reached No. 4 on the Billboard Contemporary Jazz Albums chart and No. 5 on the Billboard Jazz Albums chart.

Guest artists such as Lalah Hathaway, Will Downing and Jonathan Butler appear on the album.

== Critical reception ==
Professional ratings
Review scores
Source	Rating
AllMusic	3/5 stars

Leo Stanley of AllMusic noted "Live to Love finds Gerald Albright returning to urban R&B, turning in an album of laid-back, polished soul and smooth jazz."

== Track listing ==
Track no.	Song title	Songwriter(s)	Length
1	"You're My Everything"	Gerald Albright, Marc Scarborough	04:58
2	"All I Wanna Do"	Gerald Albright, David Delhomme	05:43
3	"About Last Night"	DaMone Arnold Antoine, Michael Terrel White	04:34
4	"Sooki Sooki"	Gerald Albright	05:07
5	"Live to Love"	Gerald Albright	05:37
6	"Beautiful Like You"	Gerald Albright, Marc Scarborough	05:31
7	"Lonely Winds"	Gerald Albright, Gorden Campbell, Shyronda Felder, Sy Smith	04:35
8	"Creepin'"	Gerald Albright, Jacques Richmond	04:43
9	"Killin' Don't Make No Sense"	Gerald Albright	04:51
10	"The Good Ole Days"	Gerald Albright	05:47
11	"You're My Everything" (Reprise)	Gerald Albright, Marc Scarborough	02:18

== Personnel ==
Musicians

- Gerald Albright – alto saxophone (1–4, 7–11), tenor saxophone (1, 5, 9–11), bass guitar (1, 4–6, 8, 9, 11), drum programming (1, 2, 4, 5, 9–11), keyboard bass (2, 4, 10), EWI (2), keyboards (5), soprano saxophone (6), alto flute (6), flute (6), additional programming (10)
- David Delhomme – keyboards (1–4, 6, 8–11), keyboard programming (4), analog synthesizer solo (10)
- Marc Scarborough – additional programming (1, 6, 11)
- Morris Pleasure – keyboards (4)
- David Goldblatt – keyboards (5)
- Gordon Campbell – keyboards (7), drum programming (7)
- Jonathan Butler – acoustic guitar (1, 11)
- Paul Jackson Jr. – rhythm guitar (1, 9, 11), guitars (4, 5), acoustic guitar (6), guitar ad libs (9)
- Tim Carmon – keyboard bass (3)
- Jacques Richmond – drum programming (3, 8), keyboards (8), guitars (8)
- Michael White – drums (4–6)
- Ray Brown – flugelhorn (4)

Vocalists

- Jonathan Butler – featured vocals (1, 11), ad libs (1, 11)
- Wallace Scott – featured backing vocals (2), vocal ad libs (2)
- Walter Scott – featured backing vocals (2)
- Michael White – featured lead and backing vocals (3), vocal arrangements (3)
- Jacques Richmond – additional vocal arrangements (3)
- Selina Albright – backing vocals (4, 5, 8)
- Will Downing – featured backing vocals (6), vocal ad libs (6)
- Lalah Hathaway – featured lead vocals (7), backing vocals (7), vocal arrangements (7)
- Shyronda Felder – backing vocals (7)
- Sy Smith – backing vocals (7)
- Gerald Albright – backing vocals (9, 10)
- Tim Owens – featured backing vocals (9), ad libs (9)

== Production ==
- Raymond A. Shields II – executive producer, management, direction
- Gerald Albright – producer, recording
- Marc Scarborough – producer (1, 6, 11)
- David Delhomme – producer (2)
- Michael White – producer (3)
- Gordon Campbell – producer (7)
- Jacques Richmond – producer (8)
- Anthony Jeffries – recording, mixing
- Future Disc (Hollywood, California) – mastering location
- Elizabeth Barrett – art direction, design
- Albert Sanchez – photography
- Derek Lee – clothing
- Ron Graves – hair stylist
- Lalette Littlejohn – make-up
- Black Dot Management – management company
