= Love's the Place to Be =

Studio album by Will Downing
- Released: August 3, 1993
- Studios: Skyline and Electric Lady (New York City, New York); East Bay (Tarrytown, New York); Record One and the Carriage House (Los Angeles, California)
- Genres: Funk; R&B; soul; jazz
- Length: 56:34
- Label: Mercury
- Producers: Bob Baldwin; Will Downing; Barry J. Eastmond; Ronnie Foster; Rex Rideout

Will Downing chronology
A Dream Fulfilled (1991)	Love's the Place to Be (1993)	Moods (1995)

Love's the Place to Be is the fourth studio album by the American musician Will Downing, released by Mercury Records in 1993. His first album for the label, it peaked at number 166 on the US Billboard 200. "There's No Living Without You" peaked at number 67 on the UK Singles Chart.

== Production ==
Among the album's many producers were Barry Eastmond and Ronnie Foster. Stevie Wonder contributed harmonica to "That's All". Rachelle Ferrell duets with Downing on "Nothing Has Ever Felt Like This".

== Critical reception ==
Professional ratings
Review scores
Source	Rating
AllMusic	3/5 stars
The Charlotte Observer	4/4 stars
Daily Breeze	1/4 stars
The Encyclopedia of Popular Music	2/5 stars
Music Week	2/5 stars
MusicHound R&B: The Essential Album Guide	4.5/5 stars

The Atlanta Journal-Constitution called the album "the kind of romantic, elegant material that fans of the highly touted Luther Vandross wish he would return to." The Charlotte Observer deemed it "a masterpiece," writing that "the three-song suite 'Do You Still Love Me'/'Hey Girl'/'Break Up to Make Up' is one of the best things to hit CD in a long time." The Dallas Morning News thought that "Downing has matured into a stunning stylist, caressing such classics as Nat 'King' Cole's 'That's All' [and] the Stylistics' 'Break Up to Make Up' ... with a reverence that still leaves room for redefining."

The Daily Breeze wrote that "most of the 11 tracks spin at the same speed and intensity, thus there is no chance for the highs and lows." The New York Times said that Downing's "rich baritone is tailor-made for intimacy, his phrasing both deliberate and effortless."

AllMusic editor Jason Birchmeier wrote that "these songs were all some of Downing's best work ... showcasing his vocal prowess."

== Track listing ==
Love's the Place to Be track listing
No.	Title	Writer(s)	Producer(s)	Length
1.	"There's No Living Without You"	Greg Smith; Conner Reeves	Rex Rideout; Will Downing	4:15
2.	"Sailing on a Dream"	Bob Baldwin; James Robinson; Downing	Baldwin; Downing	6:09
3.	"One Moment"	Ronnie Garrett; Vastine Pettis; Rideout	Barry Eastmond	4:43
4.	"Nothing Has Ever Felt Like This" (featuring Rachelle Ferrell)	Ferrell	Eastmond	6:21
5.	"Love's the Place to Be"	Ronnie Foster	Foster	5:00
6.	"Lovers Paradise"	Susaye Greene; Foster	Foster	4:42
7.	"Everything to Me"	Rideout; Downing	Rideout; Downing	4:20
8.	"Do You Still Love Me"	Eastmond; Downing	Eastmond	4:55
9.	"Hey Girl"	Gerry Goffin; Carole King	Baldwin; Downing	5:25
10.	"Break Up to Make Up"	Thom Bell; Linda Creed; Kenneth Gamble	Baldwin; Downing	5:07
11.	"That's All"	Alan Brandt; Bob Haymes	Foster	5:37
Total length:				56:34

== Personnel ==
- Will Downing – vocals, backing vocals (1–3, 6–10)
- Rex Rideout – all instruments (1), keyboards (7), drum programming (7)
- Bob Baldwin – keyboards (2, 9, 10), acoustic piano solo (2), backing vocals (2), scat (2)
- Barry Eastmond – keyboards (3, 8), electric piano (4), acoustic piano solo (8)
- Jason Miles – synthesizer programming (3, 8)
- Rachelle Ferrell – grand piano (4), vocals (4)
- Ronnie Foster – keyboards (5, 6, 11), vibraphone solo (5), backing vocals (6)
- Eddie Martinez – guitars (3, 8)
- Kevin Eubanks – guitars (4), guitar solo (9)
- Mike Campbell – guitars (4)
- Paul Jackson Jr. – guitars (6, 11)
- Mike Ciro – guitars (7)
- Clarance "Binky" Brice – guitars (9)
- Georg Wadenius – sitar (10)
- Larry Kimpel – bass (2)
- Victor Bailey – bass (3)
- Anthony Jackson – bass (4, 8, 10)
- Jimmy Johnson – bass (5)
- Gerald Albright – bass (6), sax solo (10)
- Carl Carter – bass (9)
- Freddie Washington – bass (11)
- Omar Hakim – drums (2)
- Rayford Griffin – drums (3, 8)
- Buddy Williams – drums (4, 10)
- Harvey Mason – drums (5, 6, 11)
- Neal Adams – drums (9)
- Bashiri Johnson – percussion (3, 8)
- Steve Thornton – percussion (4)
- Luis Conte – percussion (6)
- Steve Kroon – percussion (9, 10)
- Marion Meadows – saxophone (8)
- Stevie Wonder – harmonica solo (11)
- B.J. Nelson – backing vocals (1)
- Paulette McWilliams – backing vocals (2, 10)
- Cindy Mizelle – backing vocals (3, 8)
- Audrey Wheeler – backing vocals (3, 7–9), vocals (7)
- Craig Derry – backing vocals (9)
- Curtis King – backing vocals (10)
- Vaneese Thomas – backing vocals (10)

Music arrangements

- Rachelle Ferrell – arrangements (4)
- Chris Cameron – string arrangements (5)
- Ronnie Foster – arrangements (5, 6), string arrangements (11)
- Onaje Allan Gumbs – string arrangements (10)
- George Del Barrio – string conductor (5), string arrangements (11)

Production

- Will Downing – producer (1, 2, 7, 9, 10)
- Rex Rideout – producer (1, 7)
- Bob Baldwin – producer (2, 9, 10)
- Barry J. Eastmond – producer (3, 4, 8)
- Ronnie Foster – producer (5, 6, 11)
- Northern Xposure – artwork
- Michael Bays – art direction
- Étsuko Iseki – design
- David Robin – photography
- Rick Jones – stylist
- Desiree Diggs – make-up
- Sabato Russo – clothing

Technical credits

- Greg Calbi – mastering at Sterling Sound (New York City, New York)
- Doug DeAngelis – recording (1), mixing (1)
- Carl Beatty – engineer (1, 3, 8, 10), mixing (1), recording (4)
- Alec Head – engineer (1, 3, 8, 10), recording (4), mixing (7, 10), mix engineer (9)
- Earl Cohen – engineer (3, 8)
- Steve Wallace – recording (4)
- Rachelle Ferrell – mixing (4)
- Erik Zobler – mixing (4)
- Brad Gilderman – engineer (5, 6, 11), recording (5, 6, 11), mixing (5, 6, 11)
- Martin Horenburg – engineer (5, 6)
- Scott Mabuchi – engineer (10)
- Alex Gordon – engineer (10)
- Bill Leonard – engineer (11)
- John Wall – assistant engineer (1, 2)
- Kate Broudy – assistant engineer (2)

== Charts ==
Chart performance for Love's the Place to Be
Chart (1993)	Peak position
US Billboard 200	166
US Top R&B/Hip-Hop Albums (Billboard)	24
