= Pushing the Envelope (album) =

Studio album by Gerald Albright
- Released: June 15, 2010
- Recorded: Unknown
- Studio: Bright Music Studios (Castle Rock, Colorado)
- Genre: Jazz; R&B
- Length: 52:39
- Label: Heads Up Records
- Producer: Gerald Albright

Gerald Albright chronology
Sax for Stax (2008)	Pushing the Envelope (2010)	24/7 (2012)

Singles from Pushing the Envelope
- 1. "I Found the Klugh" Released: 2010; 2. "Highway 70" Released: 2010

Pushing the Envelope is the twelfth studio album by saxophonist Gerald Albright, released in 2010 on Heads Up Records. This album peaked at No. 6 on the US Billboard Top Jazz Albums chart and No. 2 on the US Billboard Top Contemporary Jazz Albums chart.

== Critical reception ==
Professional ratings
Review scores
Source	Rating
AllMusic	3/5 stars

Alex Henderson of AllMusic stated "despite the presence of a few weak tracks, Pushing the Envelope on the whole isn't a bad album. Anyone who owns a copy of Live at Birdland West knows that Albright is capable of a lot more, but even so, this disc has more going for it than a lot of the smooth jazz-oriented releases of 2010."

== Accolades ==
Pushing the Envelope was Grammy nominated in the category of Best Pop Instrumental Album.

== Track listing ==
All songs written by Gerald Albright, except where noted.

1. "What Would James Do?" - 5:32 (featuring Fred Wesley)
2. "Get on the Floor" (Michael Jackson, Louis Johnson) - 4:56
3. "Bobo's Groove" - 5:02
4. "Capetown Strut" - 4:52
5. "Close to You" (Burt Bacharach, Hal David) - 4:57
6. "I Found the Klugh" - 5:36 (featuring Earl Klugh)
7. "Embrace the Spirit" - 6:01
8. "The Road to Peace [A Prayer for Haiti]" - 5:10 (featuring George Duke)
9. "Highway 70" - 4:53
10. "From the Soul" - 5:40

== Personnel ==
- Gerald Albright – alto saxophone (1–4, 6–10), baritone saxophone (1–4, 6, 7, 9, 10, tenor saxophone (1–4, 6–10), keyboards (1, 4, 6–8), bass guitar (1–3, 5–8, 10), drum programming (1), synthesizer programming (2, 3), EWI controller (2–4, 6, 7, 9), backing vocals (4, 5), synthesizers (5), flute (5), soprano saxophone (5, 8), percussion programming (6, 8)
- Tracy Carter – keyboards (1–5, 7–10)
- Luther "Mano" Hanes – keyboards (6)
- George Duke – acoustic piano (8)
- Rick Watford – guitars (1–3, 6–10)
- Earl Klugh – acoustic guitar (6)
- Ricky Lawson – drums (2–10)
- Fred Wesley – trombone (1)
- Mark Cargill – string section (2, 5), string arrangements and conductor (2, 5)
- Selina Albright – backing vocals (2, 5)

== Production ==
- Mark Wexler – executive producer
- Gerald Albright – producer, arrangements, recording
- Yuya Morishita – drum recording (2–10) at Ahhsum Studios (West Covina, California)
- Greg Cook – string recording (2, 5) at CCI Media (Torrance, California)
- Erik Zobler – piano recording (8) at LeGonks West (Hollywood, California)
- Don Murray – mixing at G Studio Digital (Studio City, California)
- Sangwook "Sunny" Nam – mastering at The Mastering Lab (Ojai, California)
- Larissa Collins – art direction
- Albert J. Roman – cover design
- Lori Stoll – photography
- Steve Chapman for Chapman and Co. Management, Inc. – management
