= Orsonnette =

Commune in Puy-de-Dôme, France

- Part of Nonette-Orsonnette
- Location of Orsonnette
- Location within France Location within Auvergne-Rhône-Alpes
- Coordinates: 45°28′34″N 3°18′00″E
- Country: France
- Region: Auvergne-Rhône-Alpes
- Department: Puy-de-Dôme
- Arrondissement: Issoire
- Canton: Brassac-les-Mines
- Commune: Nonette-Orsonnette
- Area^{1}: 3.05 km^{2} (1.18 sq mi)
- Highest elevation: 490 m (1,610 ft)
- Lowest elevation: 389 m (1,276 ft)
- Population (2018): 226
  - Density: 74.1/km^{2} (192/sq mi)
- Time zone: UTC+01:00 (CET)
  - Summer (DST): UTC+02:00 (CEST)
- Postal code: 63340
- ^{1} French Land Register data, which excludes lakes, ponds, glaciers > 1 km^{2} (0.386 sq mi or 247 acres) and river estuaries.

Orsonnette (French pronunciation: [ɔʁsɔnɛt]; Occitan: Orsonede) is a former commune in the Puy-de-Dôme department in Auvergne in central France. On 1 January 2016, it was merged into the new commune of Nonette-Orsonnette.

== See also ==
- Communes of the Puy-de-Dôme department
