= Legacy (Hiroshima album) =

Studio album by Hiroshima
- Released: August 18, 2009
- Studio: Studio Tofuville
- Genre: Jazz
- Label: Heads Up Records
- Producer: Dan Kuramoto

Hiroshima chronology
Little Tõkyõ (2007)	Legacy (2009)	Departure (2011)

Legacy is the sixteenth studio album by Hiroshima it was nominated for Best Pop Instrumental Album at the 52nd Annual Grammy Awards (held on January 31, 2010).

== Track listing ==
No.	Title	Writer(s)	Length
1.	"Wind of Change"	Dan Kuramoto; Dane Matsumura; Richard Matthews	7:09
2.	"Turning Point"	June Kuramoto; Dave Iwataki	6:17
3.	"One Wish"	Dan Kuramoto	4:48
4.	"Dada"	Peter Hata; Dan Kuramoto	6:28
5.	"I've Been Here Before"	June Kuramoto; Derek Nakamoto	5:31
6.	"East"	Dan Kuramoto	6:36
7.	"Roomful of Mirrors"	Dan Kuramoto	3:57
8.	"Another Place"	Dan Kuramoto	9:35
9.	"Save Yourself for Me"	Dan Kuramoto	5:40
10.	"Hawaiian Electric"	Dan Kuramoto; June Kuramoto	6:28
11.	"Thousand Cranes"	June Kuramoto; Derek Nakamoto	4:03
Total length:			1:06:32

== Awards ==
Year	Award	Result
2010	52nd Annual Grammy Awards Best Pop Instrumental Album	Nominated

== Hiroshima ==
- June Kuramoto (koto, vocals)
- Dan Kuramoto (saxophone, flute, shakuhachi, synths, vocals)
- Kimo Cornwell (piano, keyboards, synths)
- Danny Yamamoto (drums, percussion)
- Dean Cortez (bass guitar)
- Shoji Kameda (taiko, percussion)
