= Love, Lust, & Lies: An Audio Novel =

Love, Lust & Lies: An Audio Novel

Studio album by Will Downing
- Released: September 14, 2010
- Genre: Funk; Soul
- Length: 57:45
- Label: Concord
- Producer: Will Downing; Chris "Big Dog" Davis; Rex Rideout

Will Downing chronology
Classique (2009)	Love, Lust & Lies: An Audio Novel (2010)	Silver (2013)

Singles from Love, Lust & Lies: An Audio Novel
- 1. "Glad I Met You Tonight" Released: August 24, 2010

Love, Lust & Lies: An Audio Novel is a studio album by American singer-songwriter Will Downing, released by Concord Music Group on September 14, 2010.

== Critical reception ==
Professional ratings
Review scores
Source	Rating
AllMusic	4/5 stars

Thom Jurek of AllMusic praised Downing's songwriting and production on the album.

== Singles ==
"Glad I Met You Tonight" was released as the lead single from the album on August 24, 2010.

== Track listing ==
No.	Title	Composer(s)	Length
1.	"Glad I Met You Tonight"	Will Downing, Chris Davis	3:49
2.	"Feelin' Alright"	Downing, Davis	4:33
3.	"Lust at First Sight"		0:49
4.	"Get to Know You"	Downing, Davis	4:06
5.	"Tell Me"	Downing, Davis	4:00
6.	"Consensual"	Downing, Davis, Taylor	4:01
7.	"Safe in His Arms"	Downing, Davis, Hollister	4:18
8.	"Put Yo Momma on the Phone"		0:38
9.	"Fly Higher"	Downing, Davis, Taylor	4:49
10.	"Saturday"	Downing, Davis	2:48
11.	"Guess Who's Back"		1:58
12.	"Shades"	Downing, Davis, Taylor	4:25
13.	"Extra! Extra!"		1:03
14.	"Libido Interuptus"		0:53
15.	"Do You Know"	Downing, Randy Bowland	4:15
16.	"You Do U"		0:54
17.	"At This Moment"	Billy Vera	4:41
18.	"I Got You Back"		0:31
19.	"Coulda Been/Shoulda Been"	Downing, Davis	4:05
20.	"Déjà Vu (Glad I Met You Tonight)"		1:09

== Charts ==
Chart (2010)	Peak position
US Billboard 200	42
US Top R&B/Hip-Hop Albums (Billboard)	11
