= Giving Myself to You =

Studio album by Gerald Albright
- Released: September 5, 1995
- Studio: Cherokee Studios (Hollywood, California); The Bakery Recording Studios (North Hollywood, California); Blue Palm Studios (Burbank, California); Power Station (New York City, New York)
- Genre: Jazz
- Length: 1:03:23
- Label: Atlantic
- Producer: Gerald Albright

Gerald Albright chronology
Smooth (1994)	Giving Myself to You (1995)	Live to Love (1997)

Professional ratings
Review scores
Source	Rating
AllMusic	1.5/5 stars

Giving Myself to You is the fifth studio album by Gerald Albright, released in 1995 by Atlantic Records. This album reached No. 10 on the US Billboard Top Jazz Albums chart.

== Background ==
Giving Myself to You was produced by Gerald Albright. Guest artists such as George Duke, Joe Sample, Bobby Lyle and Stanley Clarke appear on the album.

== Track listing ==
Track no.	Song title	Songwriter	Length
1	"Samba Queen"	Gerald Albright	08:20
2	"Chips N' Salsa"	Gerald Albright	05:16
3	"Oo Pah Doo"	Gerald Albright	07:10
4	"Lucky 7"	Gerald Albright	07:26
5	"Oo Pah Doo" (Interlude)	Gerald Albright	00:43
6	"Made in Chicago"	Gerald Albright	07:54
7	"Two Steppin'"	Gerald Albright	06:27
8	"Mr. Right"	Gerald Albright	07:57
9	"Planet Earth"	Yusef Lateef	05:20
10	"Made in Chicago" (Interlude)	Gerald Albright	01:05
11	"Giving Myself to You"	Gerald Albright	05:45

== Personnel ==
- Gerald Albright – alto saxophone, tenor saxophone (3, 4, 6, 10), soprano saxophone (4), flute (4)
- George Duke – acoustic piano (1, 8, 11)
- Bobby Lyle – acoustic piano (2–4, 9)
- Ronnie Foster – Hammond B3 organ (3)
- Joe Sample – acoustic piano (6)
- Cyrus Chestnut – acoustic piano (7)
- Stanley Clarke – acoustic bass (1, 8, 11)
- Tony Dumas – acoustic bass (2–6, 9, 10)
- Steve Kirby – acoustic bass (7)
- Harvey Mason – drums (1, 8, 9, 11)
- Leon "Ndugu" Chancler – drums (2–5)
- Gordon Campbell – drums (6, 10)
- Al Jackson – drums (7)
- Munyungo Jackson – percussion (1, 8, 11)
- Paulinho da Costa – percussion (2, 4, 6)
- Ray Brown – trumpet (2–4, 8), flugelhorn (2–4, 8)
- Oscar Brashear – featured muted trumpet (3), featured flugelhorn (3), trumpet (9)

String section (Tracks 1, 3 & 6)

- Susie Katayama – string arrangements, conductor
- Derek Nakamoto – string arrangements
- Larry Corbett and Daniel Smith – cello
- Robert Becker – viola
- Ron Clark, Bruce Dukov, Endre Granat, Tiffany Hu, Peter Kent, David Stenske, John Wittenberg and Kenneth Yerke – violin

=== Production ===
- Raymond A. Shields II – executive producer, management
- Eulis Cathey – A&R direction
- Gerald Albright – producer
- Anthony Jeffries – recording, mixing
- Peter Doell – string recording (1, 3, 6)
- Steve Hall – mastering at Future Disc (Hollywood, California)
- Booker White – music copyist
- Cozbi Sanchez-Cabrera – art direction
- Greenberg Kingsley – design
- Everard Williams – photography
- Bridget Echols – stylist
- Ron Graves – hair
- Lalette Littlejohn – make-up
- Daryl Stewart – management
- John Tarpin III – management
- Black Dot Management – management company
