= Cannonball Musical Instruments =

American musical instrument manufacturer

- Cannonball Musical Instruments logo
- Type: Musical Instrument Manufacturer
- Industry: Musical instruments
- Founded: 1996
- Founder: Tevis and Sheryl Laukat
- Headquarters: Sandy, Utah
- Area served: Global
- Products: Woodwind instruments, Brass instruments
- Website: http://cannonballmusic.com

Cannonball Musical Instruments is a manufacturer of saxophones, clarinets, trumpets, flutes, trombones, and musical instrument accessories. The company was founded in 1996 by musicians Tevis and Sheryl Laukat, and is based in Sandy, Utah. Cannonball specializes in professional, handmade, and uniquely "acoustically hand customized" instruments.

== Saxophones ==
Cannonball saxophone

Cannonball Musical Instruments first began as a saxophone manufacturer. Cannonball saxophones in current production are student Alcazar, intermediate Sceptyr, and professional Big Bell Stone Series, Vintage Series, and Key Artist Series models, are made in a variety of finishes including The Brute (aged brass), Raven (iced black), Mad Meg (bare brass), and Hotspur (iced black and iced silver).

=== Historical list of saxophone models ===
- Royal Crown Series
- Wizard Series
- '96 Excalibur Series
- 1998 Knight Series
- 98 Knight Series
- 99 Knight Series
- Big Bell Global Series
- '03 Excalibur Series
- Big Bell Stone Series
- Alcazar
- Sceptyr
- Vintage Reborn Series
- Gerald Albright Signature Series
- Key Artist Series

==== Hand-engraved models ====
Most professional Cannonball saxophone models are hand engraved at the Utah facility, and are categorized as Unlimited or Limited.

===== Unlimited =====
- Gerald Albright signature soprano, alto, and tenor models feature hand engraving on the bell, bow, body, and key guards, including a pair of golf clubs as a nod to one of Albright's hobbies.
- Vintage Reborn soprano, alto and tenor models are engraved with a traditional-style flower design.
- Big Bell Stone Series models produced since early 2013 (excluding Raven and Hotspur) are hand-engraved instead of laser-engraved.
- Key Artist altos and tenors

===== Limited =====
A limited hand-engraving series for alto and tenor Vintage Reborn Series saxophones is made concurrently with the unlimited engravings. Chronologically, the limited engraving series to date are:

- Lady Godiva
- Sea Dog
- Falcon
- Empire
- 20th Anniversary

The first Pete Christlieb signature Vintage Series models were a limited edition sporting an engraving motif of a drag racer emitting smoke and flames to portray one of Christlieb's interests. Following the limited series, these Signature models were engraved with an unlimited flower design, and were eventually replaced by the unlimited Vintage Reborn series.

== Trumpets ==
After about a decade of manufacturing saxophones, Cannonball introduced a trumpet line. Cannonball trumpets currently in production include professional Artist Series, Big Bell Stone Series, and Lynx; semi-professional Sceptyr; and student Alcazar.

=== Professional models ===
==== 42 Artist Series ====
Made in the US and introduced in 2014, Cannonball's Artist Series trumpets include 42 (Bb), 42C (C), and 779 (flugelhorn) in various finishes. These received multiple industry awards soon after their release.

==== Big Bell Stone Series ====
There are two professional models of Big Bell Stone Series trumpets. The Big Bell 725 series has a 4.921" (125mm) bell, and the Bavarian Lion reverse leadpipe 789RL series has a 5.315" (135mm) bell. Both have a medium-large 0.459" (11.66mm) bore and are hand-built in Germany.

==== Lynx ====
The Lynx 688LX-S series, also made in Germany, is a pro model designed for lead trumpet players with a unique leadpipe, 4.803" (122mm) bell, and medium-large 0.459" (11.66mm) bore.

=== Other models ===
A silver-plated semi-professional model, the Sceptyr, was added in 2014. The student model Alcazar trumpet was introduced in 2013, with availability limited to lacquer finish.

== Clarinets ==
Cannonball Arezzo clarinets were added in 2008, and include student Zeloso, semi-pro Fiore, professional Veloce, and premium professional Piacere models. Cannonball also produces various designs of clarinet barrels and bells in cocobolo and grenadilla.

== Flutes ==
Cannonball introduced its full line of Mio flutes in 2013, including professional, intermediate, and student C flutes; professional and student piccolos; alto flutes; and bass flutes. Intermediate and solid-silver professional Mio flutes are supplied with both a standard silver-plated crown and a "Royal Crown" made of titanium with an inlaid dome-shaped stone.

== Patents ==
Cannonball owns many design patents and utility patents from the United States Patent and Trademark Office, protecting its innovations such as the Fat Neck and the use of semi-precious stones.

== Artists ==
Cannonball instruments are endorsed by over 150 musicians such as:

- Gerald Albright
- Branford Marsalis
- The New Century Saxophone Quartet
- Raul Agraz
- Winston Byrd

== The Cannonball Band ==
To show their company is run by musicians, Cannonball owners and staff compose, record, and produce music videos of live and studio recordings. Songs are composed by CEO Sheryl Laukat, artists Vince Norman and Kris Johnson, and others such as Gordon Goodwin. Performances feature President Tevis Laukat; staff Ryan Lillywhite, Randal Clark, Daron Bradford, Ryan Laukat, and Howard Summers; and various guest musicians and artists.

In January 2013, the Band performed with other Cannonball artists at the Cannonball Artist NAMM Jam hosted by Gerald Albright in conjunction with the NAMM Show.
