= Fire Wire (Larry Carlton album) =

Studio album by Larry Carlton
- Released: March 2006
- Studio: Capitol Studio B (Hollywood); Masterfonics Studio 6; The Castle (North Hollywood); The Panic Room (Hollywood); Western Recorders
- Genre: Jazz, rock
- Length: 47:15
- Producer: Csaba Petocz

Larry Carlton chronology
| Sapphire Blue (2003) | Fire Wire (2006) | The Jazz King (2006) |

Fire Wire is an album by Larry Carlton that was released in 2006. It received a nomination for Best Pop Instrumental Album at the 49th Annual Grammy Awards which took place in 2007.

== Track listing ==
All songs written and arranged by Larry Carlton.

1. "Inkblot 11 – 3:18
2. "Double Cross – 4:36
3. "Naked Truth" – 3:49
4. "Surrender" – 5:01
5. "Big Trouble" – 3:42
6. "Goodbye" – 4:40
7. "Dirty Donna's House Party" – 5:37
8. "The Prince" – 4:35
9. "Sunrise" – 5:11
10. "Mean Street" – 6:48

== Personnel ==
Musicians

- Larry Carlton – guitars
- Jeff Babko – keyboards
- Michael Rhodes – bass
- Matt Chamberlain – drums

The Sapphire Blue Horn Section

- Mark Douthit – saxophones
- Doug Moffet – baritone saxophone
- Barry Green – trombone
- Mike Haynes – trumpet

=== Production ===
- Larry Hamby – A&R
- Csaba Petocz – producer, mixing, additional engineer
- Joe Chiccarelli – engineer
- Aldo Ruggiero – additional engineer
- Mike Glines – second engineer (1–4)
- Jason Gossman – second engineer (5–10)
- Mark Ditto – second engineer (horns, overdubs)
- Doug Sax – mastering at The Mastering Lab (Ojai, California)
- Frank Harkins – art direction
- David McClister – photography
