= G (Gerald Albright album) =

Studio album by Gerald Albright
- Released: September 30, 2016
- Studio: Bright Music Studios (Castle Rock, Colorado); CDS Studios (Wallingford, Connecticut)
- Genre: Jazz
- Length: 47:11
- Label: Bright Records
- Producer: Gerald Albright; Chris Davis

Gerald Albright chronology
Slam Dunk (2014)	G (2016)	30 (2018)

G is a studio album by Gerald Albright, released in 2016 on Bright Records. This album peaked at No. 5 on the US Billboard Top Jazz Albums chart and No. 2 on the US Billboard Top Contemporary Jazz Albums chart.

== Track listing ==
No.	Title	Writer(s)	Length
1.	"Taking Control"	Gerald Albright, Chris Davis	4:04
2.	"Read Your Mind"	Myron Avant, Stephen Edward Huff	4:19
3.	"Boom Boom"	Gerald Albright	4:31
4.	"Lovely Day" (featuring Michael McDonald)	Skip Scarborough, Bill Withers	5:03
5.	"Frankie B."	Gerald Albright	5:39
6.	"Funkism"	Gerald Albright	4:11
7.	"I Miss You"	Gerald Albright	4:55
8.	"G and Doug E." (featuring Doug E. Fresh)	Gerald Albright, Chris Davis	4:57
9.	"We Came to Play (La Calle)"	Chris Davis, Barbara A. Perry	4:38
10.	"Closure"	Gerald Albright	4:54
