= Just Between Us (Gerald Albright album) =

Studio album by Gerald Albright
- Released: October 27, 1987
- Studio: Soundcastle and Elumba Studios (Hollywood, California); Silverlake Studios, Jam Power Studios and Blah Blah Studios (Los Angeles, California)
- Genre: Jazz
- Length: 47:05
- Label: Atlantic Records
- Producer: Gerald Albright

Gerald Albright chronology
Just Between Us (1987)	Bermuda Nights (1988)

Professional ratings
Review scores
Source	Rating
AllMusic	3.5/5 stars
MusicHound R&B: The Essential Album Guide	3/5 stars

Just Between Us is the debut album by Gerald Albright, released on October 27, 1987, by Atlantic Records.

== Critical reception ==
Andy Kellman of AllMusic wrote: "The sparkling 'So Amazing', featuring Albright in typically joyous form, was the major single—a number 12 hit on Billboard's Hot Black Singles chart. This established Albright's long-term presence at the fore of commercial jazz."

== Charts ==
"So Amazing", a song written by Luther Vandross, peaked at No. 12 on January 29, 1988, on the Billboard Hot Black Singles chart. The album peaked at No. 181 for 5 weeks, beginning on March 11, 1988, on the Billboard 200 and was also listed at No. 32 on Billboard Top Black Albums chart for the week of December 26, 1987.

== Track listing ==
No.	Title	Writer(s)	Length
1.	"New Girl on the Block"	Gerald Albright; Glynis Albright	5:45
2.	"Trying to Find a Way"	Gerald Albright	5:22
3.	"So Amazing"	Luther Vandross	4:42
4.	"King Boulevard"	Gerald Albright	4:26
5.	"Come Back to Me"	Gerald Albright	5:33
6.	"You're My #1"	Gerald Albright; Glynis Albright	5:56
7.	"Just Between Us"	Gerald Albright	4:47
8.	"You Don't Even Know"	Garry Glenn; Michael Logan	4:54
9.	"Softly at Sunrise"	Bobby Lyle	5:40
Total length:			47:05

== Musicians ==
- Gerald Albright – alto saxophone, tenor saxophone, bass guitar, backing vocals
- Chuckii Booker – keyboards
- Rodney Franklin – keyboards, drum programming
- Bobby Lyle – keyboards
- Patrice Rushen – keyboards
- Greg Moore – guitars
- Billy Griffin – bass guitar
- Harvey Mason – drums, drum programming
- Lloyd Michael Cook – drums
- Craig Burbidge – drum programming
- David Stewart – drum programming
- Plato Brown – percussion
- Terral Santiel – percussion
- Arish Rountree – lead vocals (1)
- Bridgette Bryant – lead vocals (6), backing vocals
- Billy Griffin – lead vocals (8), backing vocals
- Maxi Anderson – backing vocals
- Fred White – backing vocals

== Production ==
- Merlin Bobb – executive producer
- Sylvia Rhone – executive producer
- Gerald Albright – producer
- Rodney Franklin – associate producer
- Craig Burbidge – recording, mixing
- Elizabeth Cluse – associate engineer
- T. Sumiko Green – associate engineer
- John Guggenheim – associate engineer
- Fred Howard – associate engineer
- David Koenig – associate engineer
- David Kopatz – associate engineer
- Jane McCord – associate engineer
- Ted Pattison – associate engineer
- Steve Hall – mastering at Future Disc (Hollywood, California)
- Serapis Productions – administrative production
- Bob Defrin – art direction
- Jodi Rovin – type design
- Glynis Albright – wardrobe, styling
- Labella – make-up
- Rudy Pounds – hair stylist
- Raymond A. Shields II – management, direction

== Charts ==
=== Weekly charts ===
Chart (1987–1988)	Peak position
US Billboard 200	181
US Top R&B/Hip-Hop Albums (Billboard)	21

=== Year-end charts ===
Chart (1988)	Position
US Top R&B/Hip-Hop Albums (Billboard)	49
