= Dream Come True (Gerald Albright album) =

Studio album by Gerald Albright
- Released: November 6, 1990
- Studio: Bermuda Sound (Bermuda); Aire L.A. Studios (Glendale, California); The Playhouse (Los Angeles, California); The Enterprise (Burbank, California)
- Genre: Jazz
- Length: 49:44
- Label: Atlantic
- Producer: Gerald Albright; Chuckii Booker; Derek Bramble

Gerald Albright chronology
Bermuda Nights (1988)	Dream Come True (1990)	Smooth (1994)

Professional ratings
Review scores
Source	Rating
AllMusic	1.5/5 stars

Dream Come True is the third album by Gerald Albright, produced by Albright, and released in 1990 by Atlantic Records. It spent three weeks at No. 1 on the Billboard Contemporary Jazz Albums chart.

== Track listing ==
1	"My, My, My"	Kenneth Edmonds, Daryl Simmons	05:08
2	"Front Street"	Gerald Albright, Chuckii Booker	05:09
3	"Say Yes"	Gerald Albright	04:28
4	"Desire"	Derek Bramble, Simon Hale, Jeffrey Patterson	04:58
5	"Sweet Dreams"	Gerald Albright	04:56
6	"Kickin' It"	Gerald Albright	04:25
7	"Dream Come True"	Gerald Albright	06:04
8	"Can't You Feel"	Chuckii Booker	04:56
9	"Come a Little Closer"	Gerald Albright	05:26
10	"Growing with Each Other" featuring BeBe Winans	Gerald Albright	04:14

== Personnel ==
Musicians

- Gerald Albright – alto saxophone (1, 2, 4, 6, 7, 9, 10), bass guitar (1, 3, 5, 7), synthesizers (3, 5, 9), soprano saxophone (3), tenor saxophone (5, 6, 8), saxophone pads (6)
- Patrick Moten – acoustic piano (1, 9), synthesizers (1)
- Derek Nakamoto – synthesizers (1, 5), keyboards (3, 7)
- Chuckii Booker – synthesizers (2, 6, 8, 10), drum programming (2, 6, 8, 9), lead guitar (8), keyboards (9), acoustic piano (10)
- Derek Bramble – keyboards (4), lead guitar (4), drum programming (4)
- Monty Seward – additional keyboards (4)
- Paul Jackson Jr. – acoustic guitar (3), electric guitar (3), guitars (5, 7, 10)
- Sam Sims – bass guitar (10)
- Donnell Spencer Jr. – drums (1, 10)
- Chuck Morris – drums (3, 7)
- Tony Lewis – drums (5)
- Paulinho da Costa – percussion (3)
- Luis Conte – percussion (5, 7)

Music arrangements

- Gerald Albright – arrangements (1, 6), horn arrangements (8)
- Patrick Moten – arrangements (1)
- Derek Nakamoto – arrangements (1)
- Donnell Spencer Jr. – arrangements (1)
- Chuckii Booker – arrangements (6)

Vocalists

- Mark Philpart – backing vocals (1, 3, 7, 9)
- Angel Rogers – backing vocals (1, 3, 7, 9)
- Phyllis St. James – backing vocals (1)
- Gerald Albright – vocals (6)
- Chuckii Booker – backing vocals (8)
- BeBe Winans – lead vocals (10)

Choir (Track 10)

- Maxi Anderson, Billie Barnum, Voncielle Faggett, Kathy Hazzard, Dorian Holley, Clydene Jackson, Linda McCrary, Sam McCrary, Perry Morgan, Ricky Nelson, Phyllis St. James, Tony Warren, Yvonne Williams, Edna Wright and Terry Young

== Production ==
- Merlin Bobb – executive producer
- Sylvia Rhone – executive producer
- Gerald Albright – producer (1–3, 5–7, 9, 10)
- Derek Bramble – producer (4)
- Chuckii Booker – producer (8)
- Serapis Productions – administrative production
- Elizabeth Barrett – design
- David Roth – photography
- Victor Joseph – wardrobe stylist
- Tara Posey – make-up
- Ron Graves – hair stylist
- Raymond A. Shields II for Black Dot Management – management, direction

Technical credits

- Future Disc (Hollywood, California) – mastering location
- Craig Burbidge – recording (1, 3, 5–10), mixing (1–3, 5–10), engineer (2)
- Gregg Barrett – recording (1, 3, 5–10), mixing (1–3, 5–10)
- David Koenig – recording (1, 3, 5–10), mixing (1–3, 5–10)
- Jeff Balding – engineer (4), mixing (4)
- Anthony Jeffries – associate engineer (1–3, 5–10)
- Mike Scotella – associate engineer (1–3, 5–10)
- Rob Seifert – associate engineer (1–3, 5–10)
- Ian Marshall – associate engineer (2)
