= Star People Nation =

Studio album by Theo Croker

Star People Nation is a studio album by Theo Croker. The album received a Grammy Award nomination for Best Contemporary Instrumental Album.
