= What If (Jerry Douglas album) =

Studio album by Jerry Douglas
- Released: August 18, 2017
- Studios: The Butcher Shoppe and Southern Ground Studios (Nashville, Tennessee)
- Length: 52:07
- Label: Rounder
- Producer: Jerry Douglas

Jerry Douglas chronology
Traveler (2012)	What If (2017)

Professional ratings
Review scores
Source	Rating
AllMusic	4/5 stars
PopMatters	8/10

What If is a studio album by American musician Jerry Douglas. It was released in August 2017 under Rounder Records.

== Track listing ==
All tracks are written by Jerry Douglas, unless otherwise noted.

No.	Title	Writer(s)	Length
1.	"Cavebop"		4:51
2.	"Unfolding"	Edgar Meyer	7:14
3.	"2:19"	Kathleen Brennan; Tom Waits	4:09
4.	"What If"	Jerry Douglas; Jamel Mitchell	6:46
5.	"Hey Joe"	Billy Roberts	4:19
6.	"Battle Stick"	Jerry Douglas; Michael Seal	4:49
7.	"Go Ahead and Leave"		3:11
8.	"Butcher Boy"		4:34
9.	"Freemantle"	Jerry Douglas; Béla Fleck	4:28
10.	"The Last Wild Moor"		4:39
11.	"Hot Country 84.5"		3:07
Total length:			52:07

== Personnel ==
The Jerry Douglas Band

- Jerry Douglas – lead vocals, dobro, lap steel guitar
- Mike Seal – guitars
- Daniel Kimbro – bass, strings
- Doug Belote – drums
- Christian Sedelmyer – violin, strings
- Jamel Mitchell – saxophones
- Vance Thompson – trumpet

With:

- The Butchershop Sextet – backing vocals

== Production ==
- Jerry Douglas – producer
- William Sean Sullivan – recording
- Dan Davis – recording assistant
- Chris Taylor – recording assistant
- Paul Blakemore – mastering at CMG Mastering (Nashville, Tennessee)
- Jimmy Hole – package design
- Patrick Sheehan – photography
- Brittany Gillott and Brian Penix for ABI Management – management

== Charts ==
Chart	Peak position
US Top Bluegrass Albums (Billboard)	1

== Awards ==
Year	Publication	Award	Result
2017	AllMusic	Favorite Jazz Albums	N/A
2017	60th Grammy Awards	Best Contemporary Instrumental Album	Nominated
