= Nonette-Orsonnette =

- Commune
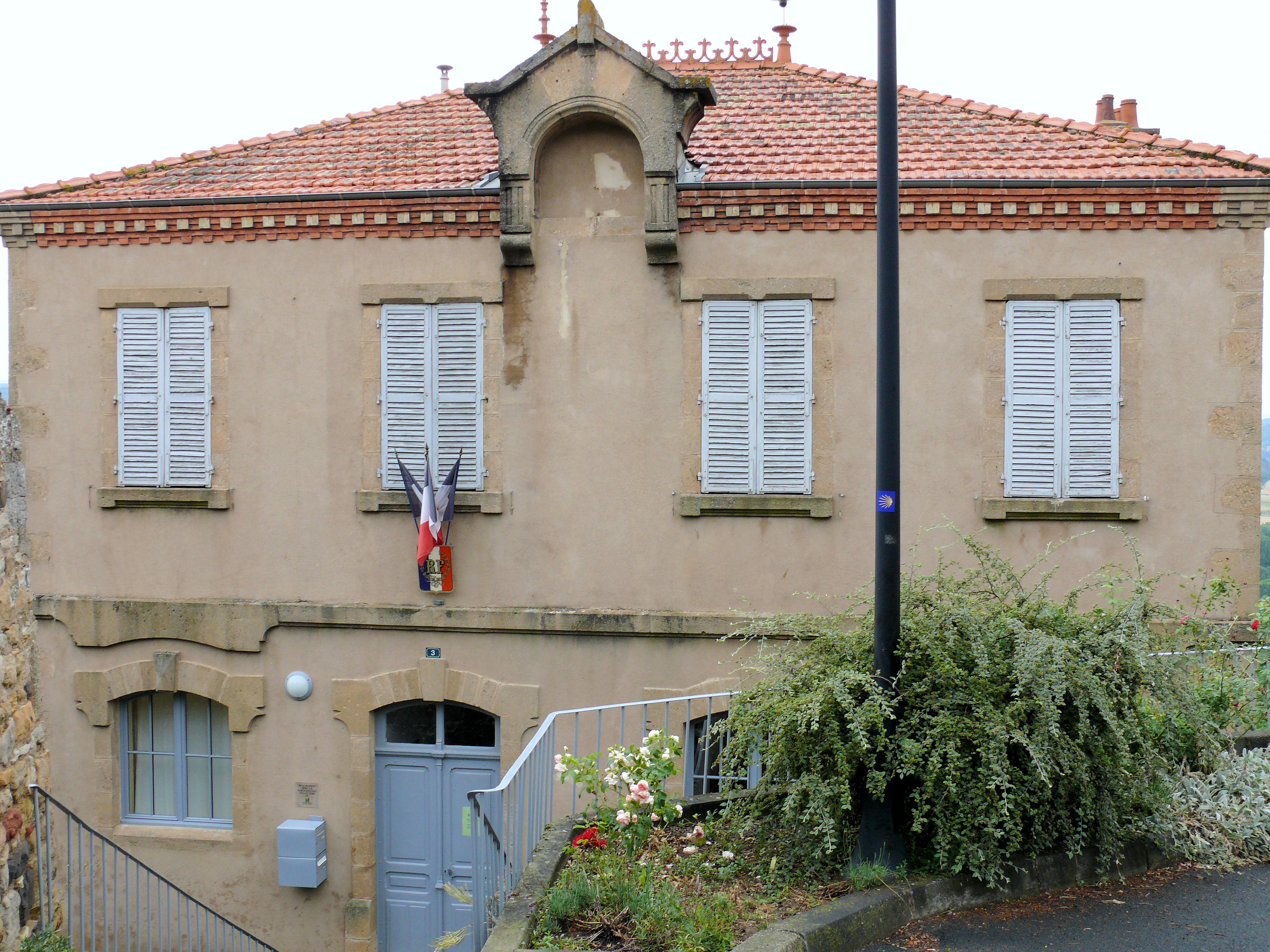
- The town hall in Nonette
- Location of Nonette-Orsonnette
- Location within France Location within Auvergne-Rhône-Alpes
- Coordinates: 45°28′30″N 3°16′44″E
- Country: France
- Region: Auvergne-Rhône-Alpes
- Department: Puy-de-Dôme
- Arrondissement: Issoire
- Canton: Brassac-les-Mines
- Intercommunality: Agglo Pays d'Issoire

Government
  - Mayor (2026–32): Pierre Ravel
- Area^{1}: 10.65 km^{2} (4.11 sq mi)
- Population (2023): 625
  - Density: 58.7/km^{2} (152/sq mi)
- Time zone: UTC+01:00 (CET)
  - Summer (DST): UTC+02:00 (CEST)
- INSEE/Postal code: 63255 /63340
- ^{1} French Land Register data, which excludes lakes, ponds, glaciers > 1 km^{2} (0.386 sq mi or 247 acres) and river estuaries.

Nonette-Orsonnette (French pronunciation: [nɔnɛt ɔʁsɔnɛt]) is a commune in the Puy-de-Dôme department of central France. The municipality was established on 1 January 2016 and consists of the former communes of Nonette and Orsonnette.

== See also ==
- Communes of the Puy-de-Dôme department
