= Grammy Award for Best Contemporary Instrumental Album =

Honor presented to recording artists for quality contemporary instrumental albums

- Awarded for: Quality instrumental albums in the pop music genre
- Country: United States
- Presented by: National Academy of Recording Arts and Sciences
- First award: 2001
- Currently held by: ARKAI – Brightside (2026)
- Website: Grammy.com

The Grammy Award for Best Contemporary Instrumental Album (previously: Best Pop Instrumental Album) is an award presented at the Grammy Awards, a ceremony that was established in 1958 and originally called the Gramophone Awards, to recording artists for quality instrumental albums in the pop music genre. Honors in several categories are presented at the ceremony annually by the National Academy of Recording Arts and Sciences of the United States to "honor artistic achievement, technical proficiency and overall excellence in the recording industry, without regard to album sales or chart position".

The award was first presented to Joe Jackson in 2001. According to the category description guide for the 52nd Grammy Awards, the award is presented to albums containing "at least 51% playing time of newly recorded pop instrumental tracks". As of 2025, Larry Carlton, Taylor Eigsti, Béla Fleck, Booker T. Jones, Edgar Meyer and Snarky Puppy are the only musicians to receive the award more than once. (Snarky Puppy has had the most wins, with 4.) Gerald Albright has received the most nominations, with six.

The award goes to the artist, producer and engineer/mixer of more than 50% of playing time on the winning album. A producer or engineer/mixer who worked on less than 50% of playing time, as well as the mastering engineer, can apply for a Winners Certificate.

In 2015, the category was renamed Best Contemporary Instrumental Album and moved from the Pop category field to the Contemporary category field. The category description did not change.

== Recipients ==
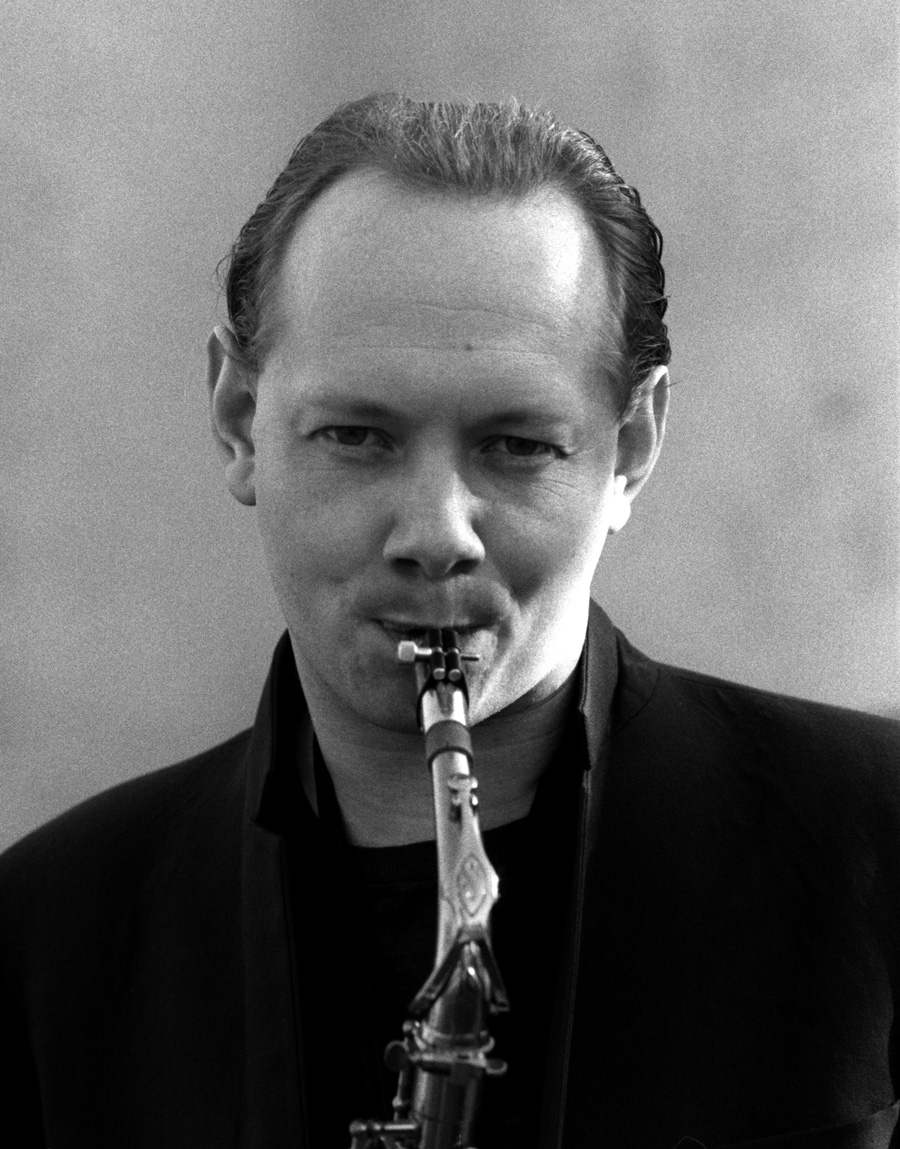
Joe Jackson was the first recipient of the award in 2001.

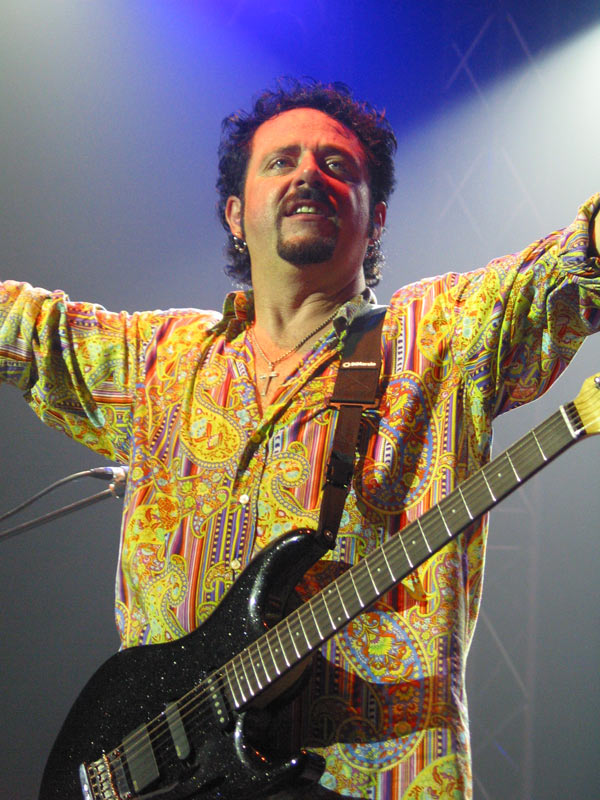
2002 award winner, Steve Lukather

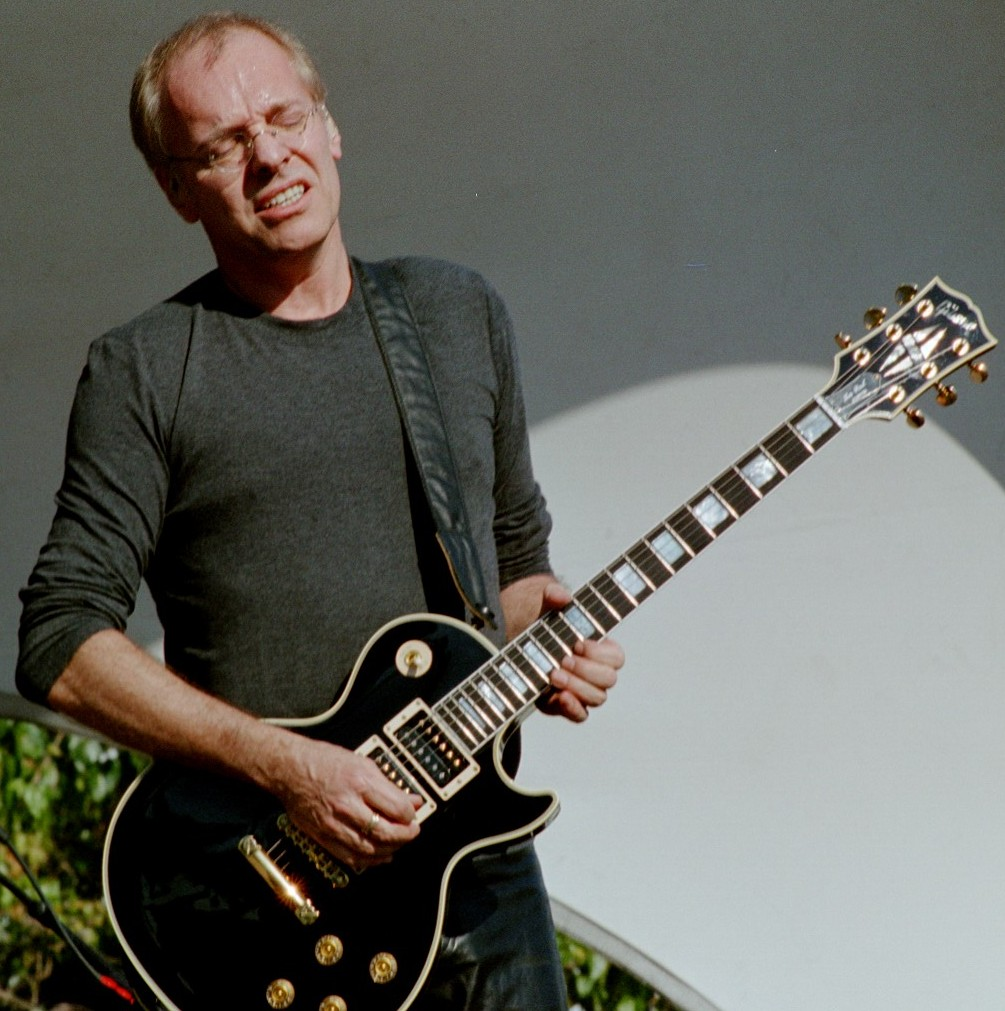
2007 award winner, Peter Frampton

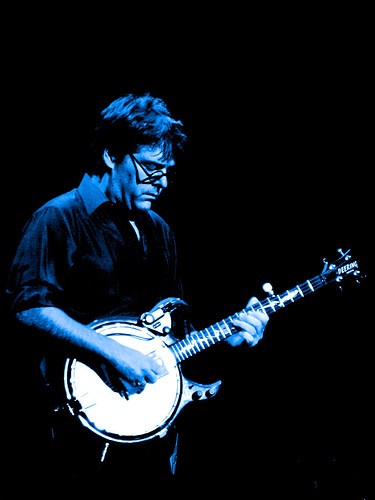
Béla Fleck of the 2009 award-winning group, Béla Fleck and the Flecktones

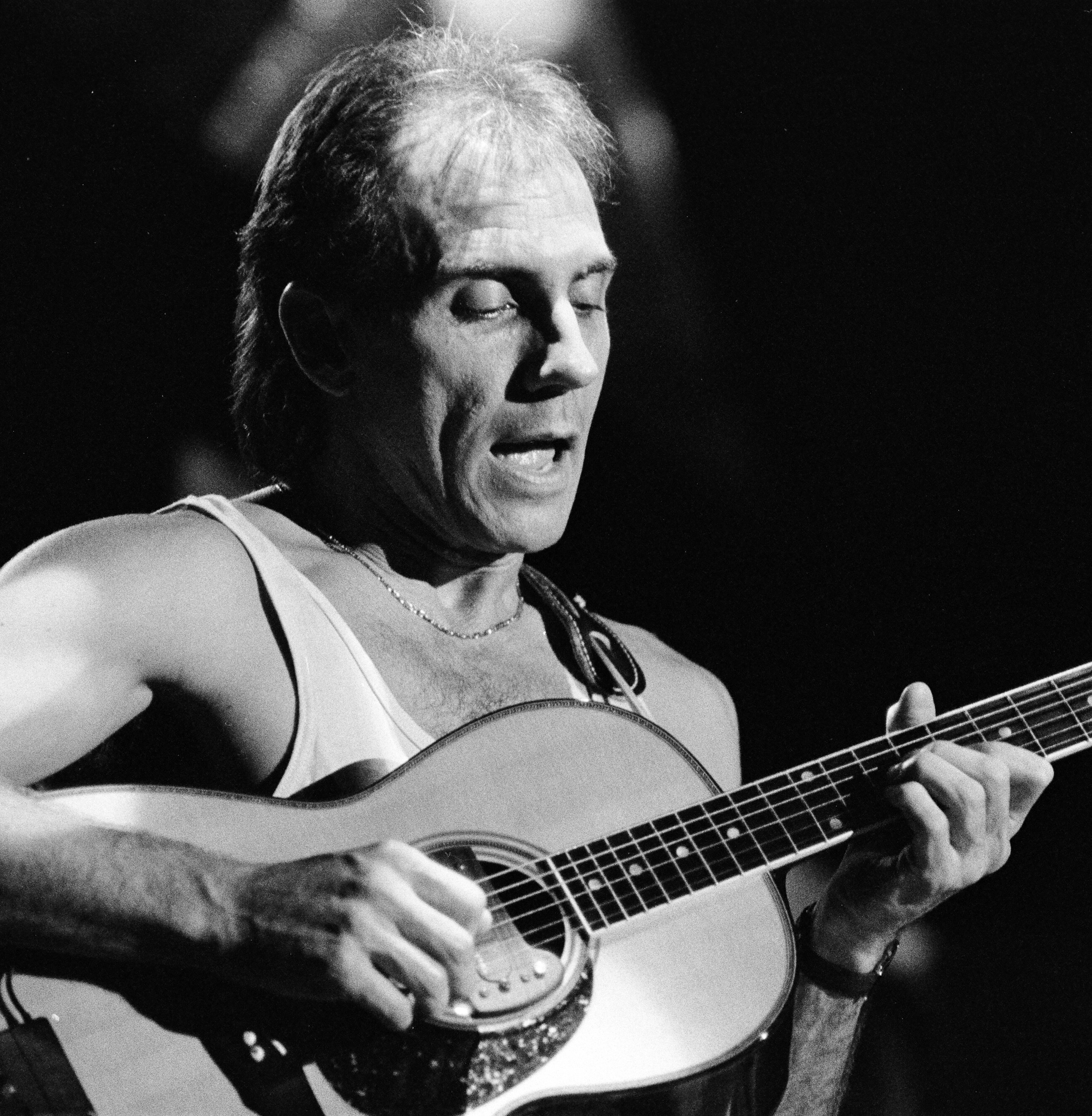
Two-time winner Larry Carlton

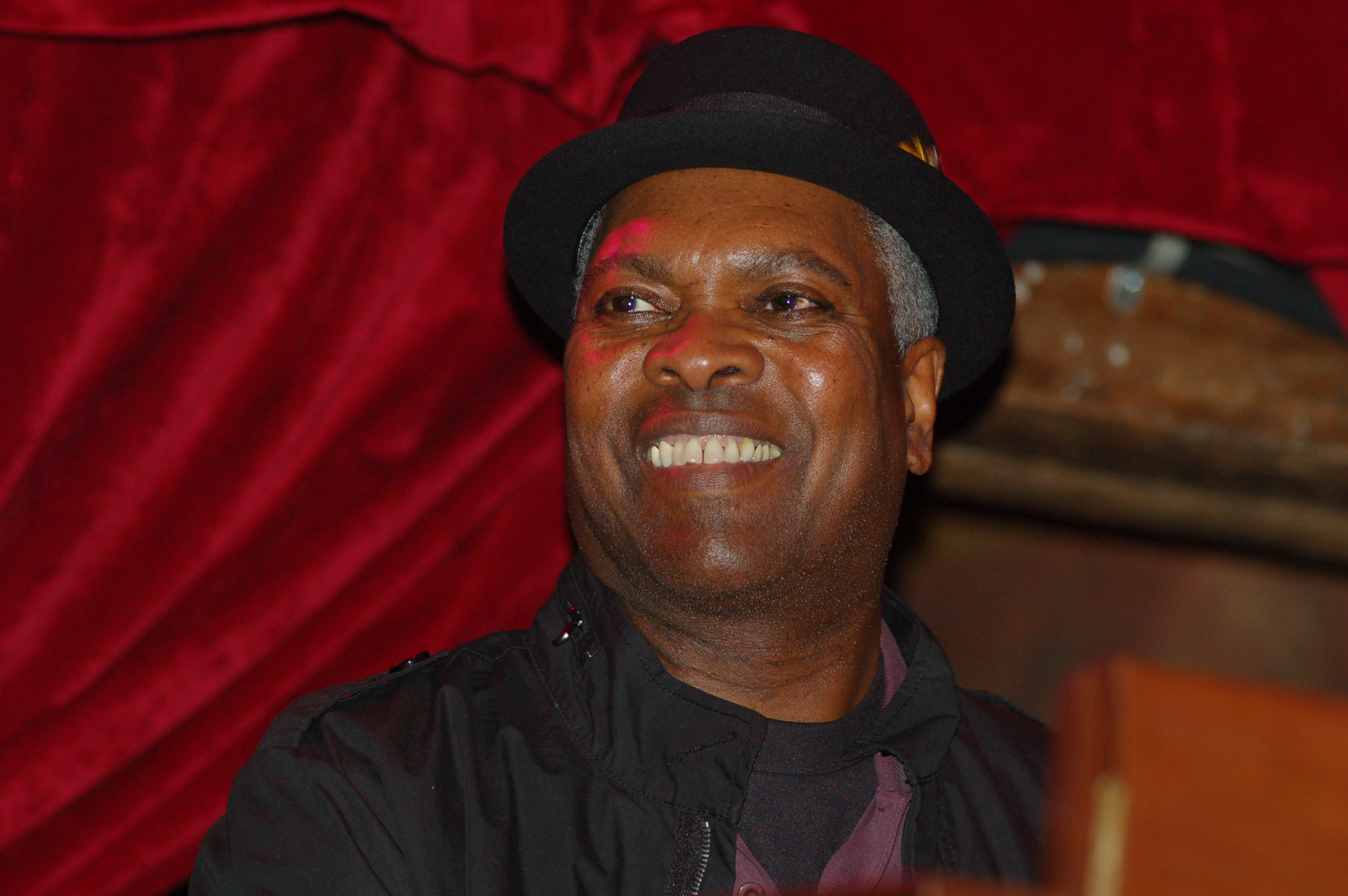
2010 award winner, Booker T. Jones

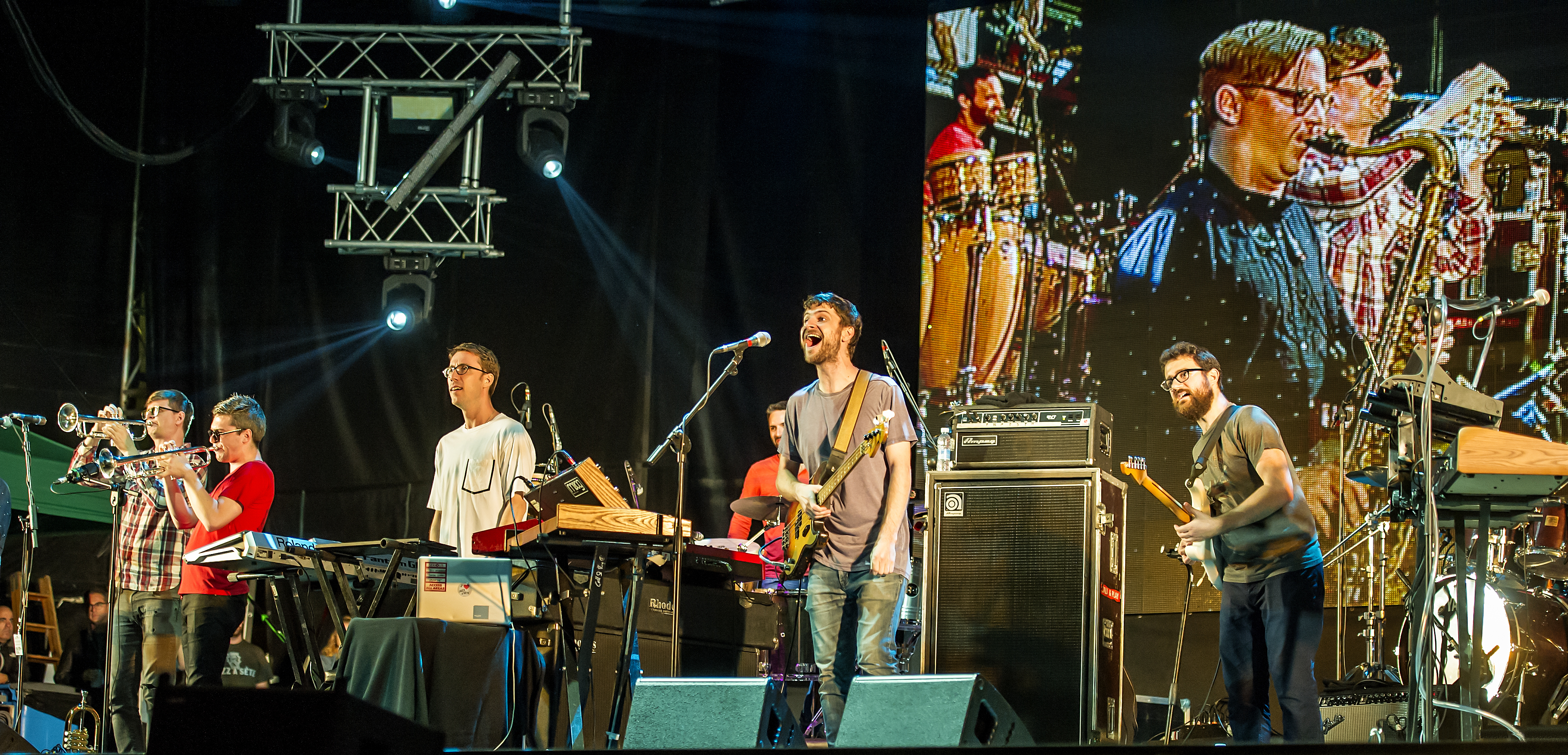
Four-time winners Snarky Puppy

=== 2000s ===
Year	Work	Artist
2001	Symphony No. 1	Joe Jackson
2001	Audio	Blue Man Group
2001	Faith: A Holiday Album	Kenny G
2001	Hymns in the Garden	Kirk Whalum
2001	Pieces in a Modern Style	William Orbit
2002	No Substitutions: Live in Osaka	Larry Carlton and Steve Lukather
2002	AArt	Acoustic Alchemy
2002	A Smooth Jazz Christmas	Dave Koz and Friends
2002	Unconditional	Kirk Whalum
2002	Voice	Neal Schon
2003	Just Chillin'	Norman Brown
2003	The Christmas Message	Kirk Whalum
2003	Paradise	Kenny G
2003	The Power of Love	John Tesh
2003	Ride	Boney James
2004	Mambo Sinuendo	Ry Cooder and Manuel Galban
2004	N.E.W.S	Prince
2004	Night Divides the Day – The Music of the Doors	George Winston
2004	Peace	Jim Brickman
2004	Wishes: A Holiday Album	Kenny G
2005	Henry Mancini: Pink Guitar	Various Artists
2005	EP 2003: Music for the Epicurean Harkener	Mason Williams
2005	Forever, for Always, for Luther	Various Artists
2005	Pure	Boney James
2005	Saxophonic	Dave Koz
2006	At This Time	Burt Bacharach
2006	Belladonna	Daniel Lanois
2006	Bloom	Eric Johnson
2006	Flipside	Jeff Lorber
2006	Naked Guitar	Earl Klugh
2007	Fingerprints	Peter Frampton
2007	Fire Wire	Larry Carlton
2007	New Beginnings	Gerald Albright
2007	Wrapped in a Dream	Spyro Gyra
2007	X	Fourplay
2008	The Mix-Up	Beastie Boys
2008	At the Movies	Dave Koz
2008	Good to Go-Go	Spyro Gyra
2008	Italia	Chris Botti
2008	Roundtrip	Kirk Whalum
2009	Jingle All the Way	Béla Fleck and the Flecktones
2009	Greatest Hits Rerecorded, Volume One	Larry Carlton
2009	A Night Before Christmas	Spyro Gyra
2009	Sax for Stax	Gerald Albright
2009	The Spice of Life	Earl Klugh

=== 2010s ===
Year	Work	Artist
2010	Potato Hole	Booker T. Jones
2010	In Boston	Chris Botti
2010	Down the Wire	Spyro Gyra
2010	Legacy	Hiroshima
2010	Modern Art	The Rippingtons featuring Russ Freeman
2011	Take Your Pick	Larry Carlton and Tak Matsumoto
2011	Everything Is Everything: The Music of Donny Hathaway	Kirk Whalum
2011	Heart and Soul	Kenny G
2011	Pushing the Envelope	Gerald Albright
2011	Singularity	Robby Krieger
2012	The Road from Memphis	Booker T. Jones
2012	E Kahe Malie	Daniel Ho
2012	Hello Tomorrow	Dave Koz
2012	Setzer Goes Instru-Mental!	Brian Setzer
2012	Wish Upon a Star: A Tribute to the Music of Walt Disney	Jenny Oaks Baker
2013	Impressions	Chris Botti
2013	24/7	Gerald Albright and Norman Brown
2013	Four Hands and a Heart, Volume One	Larry Carlton
2013	Live at the Blue Note Tokyo	Dave Koz
2013	Rumbadoodle	Arun Shenoy
2014	Steppin' Out	Herb Alpert
2014	The Beat	Boney James
2014	Hacienda	Jeff Lorber Fusion
2014	HandPicked	Earl Klugh
2014	Summer Horns	Dave Koz, Gerald Albright, Mindi Abair and Richard Elliot
2015	Bass & Mandolin	Chris Thile and Edgar Meyer
2015	Jazz Funk Soul	Jeff Lorber, Chuck Loeb and Everette Harp
2015	Nathan East	Nathan East
2015	Slam Dunk	Gerald Albright
2015	Wild Heart	Mindi Abair
2016	Sylva	Snarky Puppy and Metropole Orkest
2016	Afrodeezia	Marcus Miller
2016	The Gospel According to Jazz, Chapter IV	Kirk Whalum
2016	Guitar in the Space Age!	Bill Frisell
2016	Love Language	Wouter Kellerman
2017	Culcha Vulcha	Snarky Puppy
2017	Human Nature	Herb Alpert
2017	Unspoken	Chuck Loeb
2017	Way Back Home: Live from Rochester, NY	Steve Gadd Band
2017	When You Wish Upon a Star	Bill Frisell
2018	Prototype	Jeff Lorber Fusion
2018	Bad Hombre	Antonio Sánchez
2018	Mount Royal	Julian Lage and Chris Eldridge
2018	Spirit	Alex Han
2018	What If	The Jerry Douglas Band
2019	Steve Gadd Band	Steve Gadd Band
2019	The Emancipation Procrastination	Christian Scott aTunde Adjuah
2019	Modern Lore	Julian Lage
2019	Laid Black	Marcus Miller
2019	Protocol 4	Simon Phillips featuring Greg Howe, Ernest Tibbs and Dennis Hamm

=== 2020s ===
Year	Work	Artist
2020	Mettavolution	Rodrigo y Gabriela
2020	Ancestral Recall	Christian Scott aTunde Adjuah
2020	Beat Music! Beat Music! Beat Music!	Mark Guiliana
2020	Elevate	Lettuce
2020	Star People Nation	Theo Croker
2021	Live at the Royal Albert Hall	Snarky Puppy
2021	Americana	Grégoire Maret, Romain Collin and Bill Frisell
2021	Axiom	Christian Scott aTunde Adjuah
2021	Chronology of a Dream: Live at the Village Vanguard	Jon Batiste
2021	Take the Stairs	Black Violin
2022	Tree Falls	Taylor Eigsti
2022	At Blue Note Tokyo	Steve Gadd Band
2022	Deep: The Baritone Sessions, Vol. 2	Mark Lettieri
2022	Double Dealin'	Randy Brecker and Eric Marienthal
2022	The Garden	Rachel Eckroth
2023	Empire Central	Snarky Puppy
2023	Between Dreaming and Joy	Jeff Coffin
2023	Blooz	Grant Geissman
2023	Jacob's Ladder	Brad Mehldau
2023	Not Tight	DOMi & JD Beck
2024	As We Speak	Béla Fleck, Zakir Hussain and Edgar Meyer featuring Rakesh Chaurasia
2024	All One	Ben Wendel
2024	Jazz Hands	Bob James
2024	The Layers	Julian Lage
2024	On Becoming	House of Waters
2025	Plot Armor	Taylor Eigsti
2025	MARK	Mark Guiliana
2025	Orchestras (Live)	Bill Frisell featuring Alexander Hanson, Brussels Philharmonic, Rudy Royston and Thomas Morgan
2025	Rhapsody in Blue	Béla Fleck
2025	Speak to Me	Julian Lage
2026	Brightside	ARKAI
2026	BEATrio	Béla Fleck, Edmar Castañeda and Antonio Sánchez
2026	Just Us	Bob James and Dave Koz
2026	Ones & Twos	Gerald Clayton
2026	Shayan	Charu Suri
2027	Monk Meditations	Jon Batiste
2027	Lullaby For the Lost	Donny McCaslin
2027	A Six String Odyssey	Six String Symphony
2027	Somni	Snarky Puppy & Jules Buckley & Metropole Orkest
2027	Barcode	Ben Wendel

^{^[I]} Each year is linked to the article about the Grammy Awards held that year.

== Artists with multiple wins ==
4 wins

- Snarky Puppy

2 wins

- Larry Carlton
- Taylor Eigsti
- Béla Fleck
- Booker T. Jones
- Edgar Meyer

== Artists with multiple nominations ==
7 nominations

- Dave Koz

6 nominations

- Gerald Albright
- Kirk Whalum

5 nominations

- Larry Carlton

4 nominations

- Bill Frisell
- Béla Fleck
- Kenny G
- Julian Lage
- Jeff Lorber
- Snarky Puppy
- Spyro Gyra

3 nominations

- Chief Xian aTunde Adjuah
- Chris Botti
- Steve Gadd Band
- Boney James
- Earl Klugh

2 nominations

- Mindi Abair
- Herb Alpert
- Norman Brown
- Taylor Eigsti
- Mark Guiliana
- Bob James
- Booker T. Jones
- Chuck Loeb
- Edgar Meyer
- Marcus Miller
- Antonio Sánchez

== See also ==
- Grammy Award for Best Pop Instrumental Performance
- List of Grammy Award categories
