= Never Had a Dream Come True =

Never Had a Dream Come True may refer to:

- "Never Had a Dream Come True" (S Club 7 song)
- "Never Had a Dream Come True" (Stevie Wonder song)

== See also ==
- Dreams Come True (disambiguation)
