= 24/7 (Gerald Albright and Norman Brown album) =

Studio album by Gerald Albright & Norman Brown
- Released: June 19, 2012
- Studio: Bright Music Studios (Castle Rock, Colorado); In Your Ear Studio (Richmond, Virginia); Bedroom Studio (Nashville, Tennessee); Ahhsum Studios (West Covina, California); CCI Media (Torrance, California); Permanent Studios (Sherman Oaks, California)
- Genre: Jazz
- Length: 51:12
- Label: Concord Jazz
- Producer: Gerald Albright; Norman Brown; Herman Jackson

24/7 is a collaboration album by Gerald Albright & Norman Brown. The album was nominated for Best Pop Instrumental Album at the 55th Annual Grammy Awards.

== Track listing ==
1. "In the Moment" (Gerald Albright) - 4:47
2. "Keep it Moving" (Herman Jackson) - 5:03
3. "Perfect Love" (Norman Brown, Dr. Farid Zarif) - 4:29
4. "Buenos Amigos" (Albright) - 5:20
5. "Tomorrow" (The Brothers Johnson) - 5:53
6. "Yes I Can" (Brown) - 4:38
7. "24/7" (Albright) - 5:59
8. "Champagne Life" (David Dorohn, Shaffer Smith) - 5:22
9. "The Best Is Yet to Come" (Brown, Jeanette Harris) - 4:41
10. "Power of Your Smile" (Albright) - 5:00

== Personnel ==
- Gerald Albright – alto saxophone, tenor saxophone (1–3, 5, 6), flute (1, 3, 4, 7), bass guitar (1, 4, 7, 8), percussion programming (1, 4, 7, 8), arrangements (1, 4, 7, 8, 10), baritone saxophone (2, 3, 5, 6), horn arrangements (2, 3, 5, 6, 9), backing vocals (8), EWI (10)
- Norman Brown – lead guitar, rhythm guitar (2, 3, 5, 6, 9), arrangements (2, 3, 5, 6, 9), keyboards (8)

Additional musicians and vocalists

- Tracy Carter – keyboards (1, 7, 10), arrangements (1, 7, 8)
- Herman Jackson – keyboards (2, 3, 5, 6), arrangements (2, 5, 6), horn arrangements (2)
- Phil Davis – keyboards (4)
- Rick Watford – rhythm guitar (1, 4, 7), guitars (8)
- Byron Miller – bass (2, 3, 5, 6, 9)
- Jay Williams – drums (1, 4, 7, 8)
- Charles Streeter – drums (2, 3, 5, 6, 9)
- Ricky Lawson – drums (10)
- Ramon Ysalas – percussion (2, 3, 5, 6)
- Mark Cargill – bell programming (10), strings (10), harp (10)
- Jeanette Harris – horn arrangements (9)
- Rochella Brown – vocals (3)
- Demille Cole-Heard – vocals (3)
- Selina Albright – vocals (7), backing vocals (8)

== Production ==
- Mark Wexler – executive producer
- Gerald Albright – producer (1, 4, 7, 8, 10)
- Norman Brown – producer (2, 3, 5, 6, 9)
- Herman Jackson – producer (2, 3, 5, 6, 9)
- Michael Stever – music copyist
- Larissa Collins – art direction
- Albert J. Roman – package design
- Lori Stoll – photography
- Steve Chapman for Chapman & Co. Management, Inc. – management for Gerald Albright
- Bruce Kramer for The Kramer Entertainment Group, Inc. – management for Norman Brown

Technical credits

- Paul Blakemore – mastering at CMG Mastering (Cleveland, Ohio)
- Don Murray – mixing at Concord Studios (Los Angeles, California)
- Michael Vail Blum – mixing at Titan Studios (Sherman Oaks, California), recording
- Gerald Albright – recording
- Norman Brown – recording
- Tracy Carter – recording
- Phil Davis – recording
- Herman Jackson – recording
- Rick Watford – recording
- Jay Williams – recording

== Charts ==
=== Weekly ===
Chart (2012)	Peak position
US Top Current Album Sales (Billboard)	168
US Heatseekers Albums (Billboard)	4
US Top Jazz Albums (Billboard)	1
US Indie Store Album Sales (Billboard)	25

=== Year-end ===
Chart (2012)	Rank
Jazz Albums (Billboard)	21

Chart (2013)	Rank
Jazz Albums (Billboard)	47
