= Marvin McQuitty =

American drummer

- Birth name: Marvin McQuitty
- Born: August 30, 1966
- Died: September 11, 2012 (aged 46); Houston, TX, US
- Genres: Pop, Gospel, Soul, R&B
- Occupation: Drummer

Marvin McQuitty (August 30, 1966 – September 11, 2012) was an American gospel drummer. He played with a range of gospel artists including Fred Hammond, Israel & New Breed, Dawkins & Dawkins, Kim Burrell, Kirk Franklin and Mary Mary but also worked with pop artists like Stevie Wonder, Jessica Simpson and Destiny's Child,Gerald Albright.

McQuitty grew up in Ann Arbor, Michigan. He married Kimberly McQuitty in 1988 and had two daughters, Marielle and Simone. He died in 2012 after a 5-year struggle with the blood disorder autoimmune myelofibrosis.

In 2013 he was posthumously awarded the first ever BMI Lifetime Achievement Award.
