= Nonette, Puy-de-Dôme =

Nonette
- Part of Nonette-Orsonnette
- Location of Nonette
- Location within France Location within Auvergne-Rhône-Alpes
- Coordinates: 45°28′41″N 3°16′47″E
- Country: France
- Region: Auvergne-Rhône-Alpes
- Department: Puy-de-Dôme
- Arrondissement: Issoire
- Canton: Brassac-les-Mines
- Commune: Nonette-Orsonnette
- Area^{1}: 7.6 km^{2} (2.9 sq mi)
- Elevation: 510 m (1,670 ft)
- Highest elevation: 577 m (1,893 ft)
- Lowest elevation: 379 m (1,243 ft)
- Population (2018): 362
  - Density: 48/km^{2} (120/sq mi)
- Time zone: UTC+01:00 (CET)
  - Summer (DST): UTC+02:00 (CEST)
- Postal code: 63340
- ^{1} French Land Register data, which excludes lakes, ponds, glaciers > 1 km^{2} (0.386 sq mi or 247 acres) and river estuaries.

Nonette (French pronunciation: [nɔnɛt]; Auvergnat: Lenede) is a former commune in the Puy-de-Dôme department in Auvergne in central France. On 1 January 2016, it was merged into the new commune of Nonette-Orsonnette.

== See also ==
- Communes of the Puy-de-Dôme department
