= All the Man You Need =

2000 studio album by Will Downing

Studio album by Will Downing
- Released: July 18, 2000
- Length: 49:54
- Label: Motown
- Producer: Dwayne Bastiany; Regis Branson; Stanley Brown; Kyle Bynoe; Kevin Deane; Will Downing; James Poyser; Rex Rideout

Will Downing chronology
Pleasures of the Night (1998)	All the Man You Need (2000)	Sensual Journey (2002)

All the Man You Need is a studio album by American singer-songwriter Will Downing. It was released by Motown Records on July 18, 2000. The album was nominated in the Best Traditional R&B Vocal Album category at the 43rd Annual Grammy Awards.

== Critical reception ==
Professional ratings
Review scores
Source	Rating
AllMusic	3/5 stars
USA Today	2.5/4 stars

AllMusic editor Ed Hogan found that though there "isn't a huge difference between this album and his R&B/smooth jazz-oriented recordings of the mid-to late '90s [...] Fans of Will Downing and adult-oriented R&B music will be thoroughly pleased." He further remarked: "Though the beats may hit a little harder and there's more adherence to R&B ballad song structure, the focus is still on Downing's warm baritone vocals, soothing production, and good songs. PopMatters critic Mark Anthony Neal felt that All the Man You Need was "not likely to change opinions of Downing's work, one way or the other, but when so many veteran artists seek gimmicks to reach new audiences, Downing seems secure to simply do what he does best."

== Track listing ==
All the Man You Need track listing
No.	Title	Writer(s)	Producer(s)	Length
1.	"It's On (Intro)"	Kevin Deane; Terrance Motnsy; Will Downing	Deane	1:32
2.	"Summer Day"	Armsted Christian; Rex Rideout; Downing	Rideout; Downing	4:18
3.	"When You Need Me" (featuring Chanté Moore)	Kelly Price; Stanley Brown	Brown	5:07
4.	"Everytime It Rains"	Audrey Wheeler; Regis Branson; Downing	Branson; Downing	4:52
5.	"All The Man You Need"	Bob Baldwin; Kyle Bynoe; Downing	Bynoe; Downing	4:58
6.	"Real Soon"	Gordon Chambers; James Poyser	Poyser	3:57
7.	"Share My World"	Deane; Bynoe; Stevie Wonder; Downing	Deane	4:11
8.	"Tired Melody"	Christian; Poyser; Downing	Poyser	4:54
9.	"Grandma's Hands"	Bill Withers	Poyser	4:00
10.	"Thinkin' About You"	Dwayne Bastiany; Eric Roberson	Bastiany	3:29
11.	"Only a Moment Away"	Branson; Downing	Branson; Downing	4:29
12.	"Love of My Life"	Baldwin; Bynoe; Downing	Bynoe; Downing	4:09
Total length:				49:54

Sample credits

- "Share My World" contains excerpts from "Superwoman" as performed by Noel Pointer.

== Personnel ==
- Will Downing – vocals, backing vocals (2, 4, 7, 11, 12)
- Rex Rideout – programming (2), instruments (2)
- Stanley Brown – keyboards (3)
- Benjamin Love – keyboards (3)
- Regis Branson – keyboards (4), programming (4, 11), drums (4, 11), backing vocals (4, 11)
- Kevin Deane – additional keyboards (4), keyboards (7), programming (7)
- Bob Baldwin – keyboards (5, 12), programming (5, 12)
- Kyle Bynoe – programming (5, 12), drums (12)
- James Poyser – keyboards (6, 8, 9), programming (6), tambourine (9)
- Ed King – programming (6)
- Nunzio Signore – guitars (3, 10)
- Ira Siegel – guitars (4, 11)
- Greg Skaff – guitars (4)
- Rohn Lawrence – guitars (5, 12)
- Jef Lee Johnson – guitars (6, 8, 9)
- David Metcen – bass (4)
- Anthony Jackson – bass (6, 7, 11)
- Pino Palladino – bass (8, 9)
- Hubert Eaves IV – bass (10)
- Nathaniel Townsley III – drums (3)
- Ahmir Thompson – drums (8, 9)
- Dwayne Bastiany – drum programming (10)
- Bashiri Johnson – percussion (4, 11)
- Doc Gibbs – percussion (8)
- Nicholas Payton – trumpet (8)
- Larry Gold – cello (9), string arrangements and conductor (9)
- Davis Barnett – viola (9)
- Emma Kummow – violin (9)
- Charles Parker – violin (9)
- Igor Szwec – violin (9)
- Greg Teperman – violin (9)
- Antoinette Roberson – backing vocals (2)
- Chanté Moore – vocals (3)
- Dymon – backing vocals (3)
- Nneka – backing vocals (3)
- Audrey Wheeler – backing vocals (4)
- Denosh Bennett – backing vocals (7)
- Eric Roberson – backing vocals (10)
- Renee Neufville – backing vocals (12)

=== Production ===
- Kedar Massenberg – executive producer
- Stanley Brown – A&R direction
- Michael Michal – A&R direction
- Brain / Sensitive Guy Design – art direction
- Will Downing – photography
- Brett Panelli – photography
- Group Avenue Management – management

Technical credits

- Chris Gehringer – mastering at Sterling Sound (New York, NY)
- Kevin Deane – recording (1, 5, 7, 12)
- Alec Head – mixing (1, 4, 7, 11), recording (4, 11)
- Will Downing – recording (2, 4–7, 9, 10, 12)
- Matt Kane – recording (2)
- Ken Lewis – mixing (2)
- Chris Conway – recording (3, 10), mixing (3, 10)
- Jeff Cruz – recording (3)
- Carlos Lawrenz – recording (4)
- Carl Beatty – mixing (5, 12)
- Jim Bottari – recording (6, 9)
- Ed King – recording (6, 8)
- Jon Smeltz – recording (6, 8, 9)
- Russ Elevado – mixing (6, 8, 9)
- Pedro Serreira – recording (8, 9)
- Storm Martinez – recording (9)
- Ryan West – recording (10)
- Dana – assistant engineer (4)
- Metal – assistant engineer (4)
- John Shyloski – assistant engineer (4)
- Arnaldo Sola – assistant engineer (4)

== Charts ==
Chart performance for All the Man You Need
Chart (2000)	Peak position
US Billboard 200	100
US Top R&B/Hip-Hop Albums (Billboard)	25
