= Bermuda Nights =

Studio album by Gerald Albright
- Released: 1988
- Studio: Silverlake Studios (Los Angeles, California); Aire L.A. Studios (Glendale, California)
- Genre: Jazz
- Length: 47:05
- Label: Atlantic
- Producer: Gerald Albright

Gerald Albright chronology
Just Between Us (1987)	Bermuda Nights (1988)	Dream Come True (1990)

Bermuda Nights is the second album by Gerald Albright, released in 1988 on Atlantic Records. The album reached No. 12 on the Billboard Contemporary Jazz Albums chart.

== Accolades ==
Albright earned a Grammy nomination in the category of Best R&B Instrumental Performance for his performance on the album.

== Critical reception ==
Professional ratings
Review scores
Source	Rating
AllMusic	1.5/5 stars

Cashbox described Bermuda Nights as "satiny, contemporary pop fusion".

== Track listing ==
1	"When You Say You Love Me"	Gerald Albright, Donnell Spencer Jr.	05:04
2	"In the Mood"	Babyface, Daryl Simmons	05:50
3	"Bermuda Nights"	Albright	05:50
4	"The Hook"	Albright, Chuckii Booker	05:35
5	"Feeling Inside"	Bobby Lyle	06:35
6	"Still in Love"	Albright	05:20
7	"Truth"	Albright	05:00
8	"Too Cool"	Albright	05:25

== Personnel ==
- Gerald Albright – alto saxophone (1–4, 6, 7), tenor saxophone (1, 5, 8), backing vocals (1, 6), bass (2–8), keyboards (3), drum programming (3, 6, 7), synthesizers (4), flute (4, 8), tambourine (5), bass programming (7)
- Chuckii Booker – synthesizers (1–4, 6–8), backing vocals (1), keyboards (6, 7), drum programming (6)
- Donnell Spencer Jr. – synthesizers (1), drum programming (1), lead vocals (1), backing vocals (1)
- Rodney Franklin – acoustic piano (2), Rhodes electric piano (2)
- Bobby Lyle – acoustic piano (5, 8), synthesizers (5)
- Paul Jackson Jr. – guitars (3, 7)
- Sam Sims – bass (1)
- Harvey Mason – drums (2)
- Tony Lewis – drums (5, 8)
- Ray Brown – flugelhorn (2), trumpet (7)
- Mark Philpart – backing vocals (2)

=== Production ===
- Merlin Bobb – executive producer
- Sylvia Rhone – executive producer
- Gerald Albright – producer
- Craig Burbidge – recording, mixing
- Rob Seifert – associate engineer
- Jackie Forsting – assistant engineer
- John Guggenheim – assistant engineer
- Steve Hall – mastering at Future Disc (Hollywood, California)
- Serapis Productions – administrative production
- Bob Defrin – art direction
- Anthony Ranieri – design
- Jeff Katz – photography
- Glynis Albright – wardrobe, styling
- Ron Graves – hair stylist
- Tara Posey – make-up
- Raymond A. Shields II for Black Dot Management – management, direction
