= Gerald Albright =

American jazz saxophonist

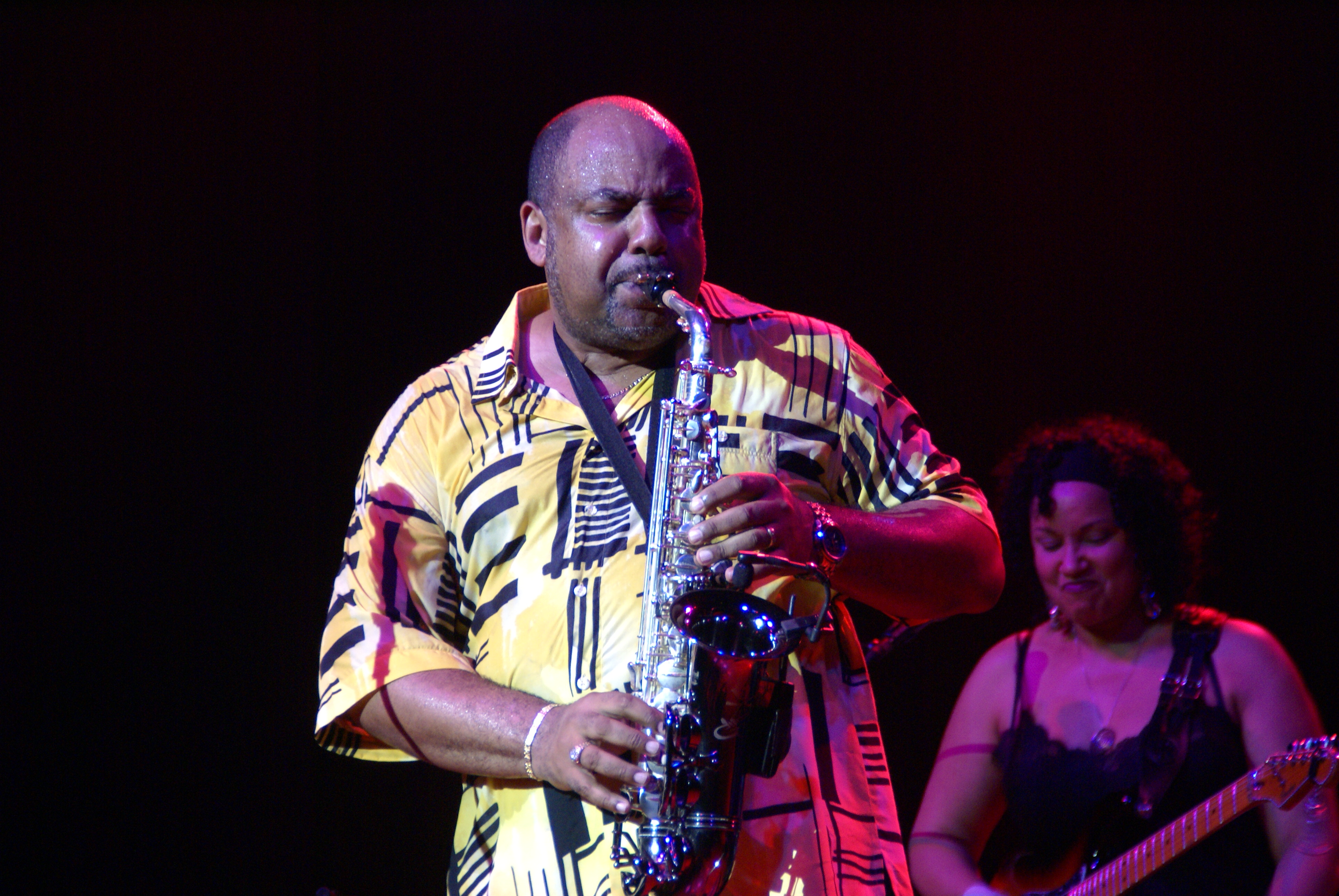

Background information
- Born: August 30, 1957 (age 69); Los Angeles, California, U.S.
- Genres: Jazz; smooth jazz; funk; disco; R&B
- Occupation: Musician
- Instruments: Saxophone; bass guitar; keyboards; flute
- Years active: 1987–present
- Labels: Atlantic/WEA; GRP; Peak; Heads Up; Concord; Bright Music
- Website: geraldalbright.com

Gerald Albright (born August 30, 1957) is an American jazz saxophonist. He earned Grammys for the albums 24/7 in 2012 and Slam Dunk in 2014 and was nominated for New Beginnings in 2008 and for Sax for Stax in 2009.

== Biography ==
Albright began piano lessons at an early age, although he professed no interest in the instrument. His love of music picked up when he was given a saxophone that belonged to his piano teacher. It further reinforced when he attended Locke High School. After high school, he attended the University of Redlands where he was initiated into the Iota Chi chapter of Alpha Phi Alpha and received a degree in business management with a minor concentration on music. He switched to bass guitar after he saw Louis Johnson in concert.

After college, Albright worked as a studio musician in the 1980s for Anita Baker, Ray Parker Jr., Olivia Newton-John, and The Temptations. He joined Patrice Rushen, who was forming a band, in which he played saxophone. When the bassist left in the middle of a tour, Albright replaced him and finished the tour playing bass guitar. Around the same time, he began to tour Europe with drummer Alphonse Mouzon. He has also toured with Anita Baker, Phil Collins, Johnny Hallyday, Whitney Houston, Quincy Jones, Jeff Lorber, and Teena Marie In addition to appearances at clubs and jazz festivals, he has been part of Jazz Explosion tours on which he played with Will Downing, Jonathan Butler, Chaka Khan, Hugh Masekela, and Rachelle Ferrell.

Albright has appeared in the television programs A Different World, Melrose Place and jazz segments for Black Entertainment Television, as well as piloting a show in Las Vegas with Meshach Taylor of Designing Women. He was one of ten saxophonists to perform at the inauguration of President Bill Clinton.

His saxophone work appears in the PlayStation video game Castlevania: Symphony of the Night during the theme song "I Am the Wind", which includes keyboardist Jeff Lorber.

Albright himself describes his playing style as being influenced to a large extent by the music which he heard when being a teenager: A mixture of gospel, Motown, Philly International Sound played by the likes of James Cleveland, The Hawkins Singers, James Brown with his band and particularly Maceo Parker.

In September 2021, Albright received the Presidential Lifetime Achievement Award from President Joseph R. Biden.

== Equipment ==
Albright plays a professional Big Bell Stone Signature Series model of saxophone made by Cannonball Musical Instruments. Of the two necks that are furnished with the Cannonball saxophones, he usually uses the "Fat Neck" with the octave vent tube on the bottom of the neck, a design similar to some vintage Conn 6M models.On mouthpieces, he uses a Beechler Diamond on alto with Silverstein Hexa ligature, Theo Wanne stainless steel Shiva on tenor. Albright also plays bass guitar.

== Discography ==
=== Albums ===
Year	Album	Peak chart positions									Label
Year	Album	US 200	US Top Sales	US Jazz	US Con. Jazz	US R&B /HH	US Trad Jazz	US Top Cur	US Ind	US Store Sales	Label
1988	Just Between Us	181	—	—	7	21	—	181	—	—	Atlantic
1988	Bermuda Nights	—	—	—	12	53	—	—	—	—	Atlantic
1990	Dream Come True	—	—	—	1	50	—	—	—	—	Atlantic
1991	Live at Birdland West – (live album)	—	—	—	—	—	4	—	—	—	Atlantic
1994	Smooth	151	151	2	2	25	—	151	—	—	Atlantic
1995	Giving Myself to You	—	—	10	—	—	4	—	—	—	Atlantic
1997	Live to Love	—	—	5	4	59	—	—	—	—	Atlantic
1998	Pleasures of the Night (Will Downing and Gerald Albright)	169	169	1	1	36	—	169	—	—	PolyGram
2001	The Very Best of Gerald Albright	—	—	19	9	—	—	—	—	—	Atlantic
2002	Groovology	—	—	5	4	—	—	—	—	—	GRP
2004	Kickin' It Up	—	—	8	5	26	—	—	—	—	GRP
2006	New Beginnings	—	—	4	1	—	—	—	—	—	Peak
2008	Sax for Stax	—	—	7	4	24	—	—	—	—	Peak
2010	Pushing the Envelope	—	—	6	2	—	—	—	—	—	Concord
2012	24/7 (Gerald Albright / Norman Brown)	—	—	1	1	—	—	168	—	25	Concord
2013	Dave Koz and Friends: Summer Horns (Dave Koz featuring Gerald Albright, Mindi Abair and Richard Elliot)	84	84	2	1	—	—	76	—	—	Concord
2014	Slam Dunk	182	182	2	2	—	—	138	—	—	Heads Up
2016	G	—	—	5	2	—	—	—	50	—	Bright
2018	30	—	—	7	3	—	—	—	—	—	Bright
2018	Dave Koz and Friends: Summer Horns II – From A to Z (Dave Koz featuring Gerald Albright, Rick Braun, Richard Elliot, Aubrey Logan)	—	55	2	1	—	—	48	—	—	Concord
2019	Not So Silent Night	—	—	18	4	—	—	—	—	—	There
"—" denotes a recording that did not chart.

=== Singles ===
Year	Title	Peak chart positions						Album
Year	Title	Hot R&B/ Hip-Hop Songs	Adult Cont.	Smooth Jazz Airplay	Hot Gospel Songs	Adult R&B Airplay	Gospel Airplay	Album
1987	"So Amazing"	12	42	—N/a	—N/a	—N/a	—N/a	Just Between Us
1988	"New Girl on the Block"	59	—	—N/a	—N/a	—N/a	—N/a	Just Between Us
1988	"Feeling Inside"	47	—	—N/a	—N/a	—N/a	—N/a	Bermuda Nights
1989	"In the Mood"	80	—	—N/a	—N/a	—N/a	—N/a	Bermuda Nights
1990	"Lift Every Voice and Sing" (Melba Moore and Friends)	9	—	—N/a	—N/a	—N/a	—N/a	Melba Moore – Soul Exposed
1990	"My, My, My"	54	—	—N/a	—N/a	—N/a	—N/a	Dream Come True
1994	"This Is for the Lover in You"	75	—	—N/a	—N/a	—N/a	—N/a	Smooth
1998	"Stop, Look, Listen to Your Heart" (Will Downing and Gerald Albright)	—	—	—N/a	—N/a	26	—N/a	Will Downing – Pleasures of the Night
1999	"Pleasures of the Night" (Will Downing and Gerald Albright)	—	—	—N/a	—N/a	30	—N/a	Will Downing – Pleasures of the Night
2000	"When You Need Me" (Will Downing featuring Chanté Moore And Gerald Albright)	—	—	—N/a	—N/a	18	—N/a	Will Downing – All the Man You Need
2005	"Hey Young World" (Gerald Albright with Kevin Toney)	—	—	10	—	—	—	Various Artists – Def Jazz
2005	"To the Max"	—	—	38	—	—	—	Kickin' It Up
2006	"We Got the Groove"	—	—	17	—	—	—	New Beginnings
2008	"Knock on Wood"	—	—	26	—	—	—	Sax for Stax
2009	"Walkin' Down Beale Street"	—	—	29	—	—	—	Sax for Stax
2010	"Highway 70"	—	—	20	—	—	—	Pushing the Envelope
2011	"I Found the Klugh"	—	—	8	—	—	—	Pushing the Envelope
2012	"In the Moment" (Gerald Albright / Norman Brown)	—	—	1	—	—	—	24/7
2012	"Champagne Life" (Gerald Albright / Norman Brown)	—	—	1	—	—	—	24/7
2013	"Full Tank" (Ben Tankard featuring Gerald Albright)	—	—	20	—	—	—	Ben Tankard – Full Tank
2013	"Got to Get You into My Life" (Dave Koz featuring Gerald Albright, Mindi Abair and Richard Elliot)	—	—	1	—	—	—	Dave Koz and Friends: Summer Horns
2013	"I Got You (I Feel Good)" (Dave Koz featuring Gerald Albright, Mindi Abair and Richard Elliot)	—	—	3	—	—	—	Dave Koz and Friends: Summer Horns
2014	"Hot Fun in the Summertime" (Dave Koz featuring Gerald Albright, Mindi Abair and Richard Elliot)	—	—	6	—	—	—	Dave Koz and Friends: Summer Horns
2014	"Slam Dunk"	—	—	1	—	—	—	Slam Dunk
2015	"SomeBossa (Summer Breezin')" (Al Jarreau featuring Gerald Albright)	—	—	11	—	—	—	Al Jarreau – My Old Friend: Celebrating George Duke
2015	"It's a Man's, Man's, Man's World"	—	—	8	—	—	—	Slam Dunk
2015	"Because of You"	—	—	1	—	—	—	Slam Dunk
2016	"Crush" (John Novello featuring Gerald Albright)	—	—	8	—	—	—	John Novello – Ivory Soul
2016	"Celebration" (Jonathan Fritzén featuring Gerald Albright)	—	—	15	—	—	—	Jonathan Fritzén – Fritzénized
2016	"Taking Control"	—	—	1	—	—	—	G (Bonus Version)
2017	"Boom Boom"	—	—	3	—	—	—	G (Bonus Version)
2017	"Frankie B."	—	—	1	—	—	—	G (Bonus Version)
2018	"Just Between Us"	—	—	5	—	—	—	30
2018	"This Will Be (An Everlasting Love)" (Dave Koz and Friends featuring Kenny Lattimore and Sheléa)	—	—	10	—	—	—	Dave Koz and Friends – Dave Koz and Friends: Summer Horns II – From A to Z
2018	"Keep That Same Old Feeling" (Dave Koz and Friends)	—	—	13	—	—	—	Dave Koz and Friends – Dave Koz and Friends: Summer Horns II – From A to Z
2018	"4 on the Floor"	—	—	2	—	—	—	30
2019	"New Beginnings"	—	—	5	—	—	—	30
2019	"Before I Let Go" (Dave Koz/Gerald Albright/Rick Braun/Richard Elliot/Aubrey Logan)	—	—	1	—	—	—	Dave Koz and Friends – Dave Koz and Friends: Summer Horns II – From A to Z
2020	"Just In" (Justin-Lee Schultz featuring Gerald Albright and Pieces of a Dream)	—	—	9	—	—	—	Justin-Lee Schultz – Gruv Kid
2020	"Better Days Ahead"	—	—	1	—	—	—	G-Stream (EP)
2021	"Hope"	—	—	1	—	—	—	G-Stream (EP)
2021	"Serendipity" (The Saxtress Pamela Williams featuring Gerald Albright)	—	—	1	—	—	—	Pamela Williams – Serendipity
2021	"Crazy"	—	—	1	—	—	—	G-Stream (EP)
2022	"G Wiggle"	—	—	1	—	—	—	G-Stream 2 – Turn It Up (EP)
2022	"Keep Holding On"	—	—	—	—	—	—	Hank Bilal – Beneath the Covers
2022	"Eddie's Groove"	—	—	2	—	—	—	G-Stream 2 – Turn It Up (EP)
2023	"On My Way" (Phylicia Rae featuring Gerald Albright)	—	—	1	—	—	—	Phylicia Rae – On My Way
2024	"Full Throttle"	—	—	1	—	—	—	G-Stream 3 – Full Throttle (EP)
2024	"Father in Heaven (Right Now)" (BeBe Winans featuring Gerald Albright)	—	—	—	10	—	1	BeBe Winans – TBA
2025	"G Funk" (Gerald Albright featuring Trombone Shorty)	—	—	14	—	—	—	G-Stream 3 – Full Throttle (EP)
2025	"Living My Best Life"	—	—	1	—	—	—	G-Stream 3 – Full Throttle (EP)
2025	"More Than Enough"	—	—	1	—	—	—	Hot Chocolate (EP)
2026	"Hot Chocolate"	—	—	17	—	—	—	Hot Chocolate (EP)
"—" denotes a recording that did not chart.

=== EPs ===
Year	Album	Label
2020	G-Stream	Bright Music
2022	G-Stream 2: Turn It Up	Bright Music
2024	G-Stream 3: Full Throttle	Bright Music

=== As sideman/guest ===
Year	Artist	Album	Label
1997	Pauline Wilson	Only You	Pony Canyon
1999	The Phil Collins Big Band	A Hot Night In Paris	Atlantic
2000	Noel Elmowy	Feelin' Good	Expansion Records
2008	Gerald Alston	Gerald Alston Sings Sam Cooke	LST CO
2026	Faye Carol	Faye Sings The Blues	Getdown Records
2026	Faye Carol	A Soulful Christmas	Getdown Records

== Grammy Awards ==
The Grammy Awards are awarded annually by the National Academy of Recording Arts and Sciences. Albright has received a sum of nine Grammy nominations.

Year	Category	Nominated work	Result
1988	Best R&B Instrumental Performance (Orchestra, Group or Soloist)	"So Amazing" (single)	Nominated
1989	Best R&B Instrumental Performance	Bermuda Nights	Nominated
2006	Best Pop Instrumental Album	New Beginnings	Nominated
2008	Best Pop Instrumental Album	Sax for Stax	Nominated
2010	Best Pop Instrumental Album	Pushing the Envelope	Nominated
2012	Best Pop Instrumental Album	24/7	Nominated
2013	Best Pop Instrumental Album	Summer Horns	Nominated
2014	Best Contemporary Instrumental Album	Slam Dunk	Nominated
2023	Best Improvised Jazz Solo	"Keep Holding On"	Nominated
