= Dreams Come True (British charity) =

Dreams Come True Charity
- Founded: 1988
- Type: Charity
- Registration no.: 800248 (England and Wales) SC043878 (Scotland)
- Purpose: Bringing joy to terminally and seriously ill children
- Location: United Kingdom
- Key people: Peter Newman, Sue Fowler, Martin Plowman, Karen Yoxall, Nick Adams
- Website: www.dreamscometrue.uk.com

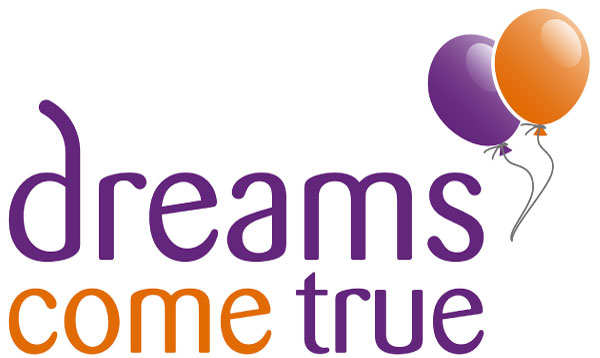
Dreams Come True

Dreams Come True Charity is a UK children's charity. The charity fulfils the dreams of children and young adults with a wide range of medical conditions, covering a wide range of locations and ages.

The charity works with children and young people between the ages of 2 and 18 who have a serious or life limiting illness and helps them to fulfil their dreams.

== Patrons ==
The list of Dreams Come True Patrons are:

- Royal Patron Princess Michael of Kent,
- Olivia Breen, Paralympian
- Louise Damen, Athlete
- Miranda Gore Browne, Celebrity Baker
- Jo Pavey, Olympic Athlete
- Jacqui Slack, Triathlete
- Kirstie Steele, Actress
- Christopher Timothy, Actor
- Kane Tomlinson-Weaver, Actor

== Felicity Wishes ==
In Dec 2013, Children's brand Felicity Wishes teamed up with Dreams Come True to help children across England get access to palliative care.

Felicity will become Dreams Come True's ambassador, running marathons, attending key events and granting dreams. Felicity Wishes will also be involved in Dreams Come True's annual Dream Tea campaign.
