= Melvin Lee Davis =

- Born: Orange County, California, U.S.
- Genres: R&B, jazz, funk, rock
- Occupations: Musician, songwriter, music director
- Instruments: Bass guitar, keyboards, piano
- Label: P-Vine
- Website: www.melvinleedavis.com

Melvin Lee Davis is an American bass player, vocalist, keyboard player, producer, TV composer and engineer based in Orange County, California. He is the music director for Grammy-award winning artist Chaka Khan and has recorded with The Pointer Sisters, Lee Ritenour, Bryan Ferry, Patti Austin and Gladys Knight & the Pips. He co-wrote "Soul Train's a-Comin", the theme song for the television show Soul Train. His albums, Tomorrow's Yesterday and Nature's Serenade were released through The Orchard; LTV: Love, Truth & Victory was released through P-Vine Records.

== Early life and career ==
Born and raised in Orange County, Melvin Lee Davis played the violin at age four and the saxophone at age six; he took up guitar while he was in high school. He was discovered by a saxophone player in Buddy Miles's jazz band who was dating his sister while Davis was playing at a club. Miles flew Davis to New York City to audition and hired him on the spot.

Davis played in New York City clubs and met Soul Train producer Don Cornelius through a mutual friend, Ron Kersey. According to Davis, Davis made many of his contacts in R&B through Cornelius. "...if you were a black musician in the business of making R&B and soul music and wanted to get on television, you had to go through Don Cornelius," he said.

His association with Cornelius lead him to co-write the Soul Train theme, "Soul Train's A-Comin'". Davis has worked for Grammy award winning singer Chaka Khan as a session and touring bassist in addition to music director. He's also worked with Lee Ritenour, Patti Austin, Gladys Knight & the Pips, The Pointer Sisters, and Bryan Ferry.

== Discography ==
- LTV: Love, Truth & Victory (1996)
- Tomorrow’s Yesterday (2000)
- Nature's Serenade (2003)
- Genre: Music (2011)

== Selected credits ==
With Lee Ritenour

- Alive in L.A.
- This Is Love
- Rit's House
- Overtime
- Wes Bound
- Smoke 'n' Mirrors
- 6 String Theory

With George Benson

- Love Remembers
- Standing Together
- Irreplaceable

With Patti Austin

- That Secret Place
- Reach

With others

- Gladys Knight & the Pips, All Our Love
- Allen Hinds, Touch
- Jeff Kashiwa, Simple Truth
