= Will Downing =

American singer and songwriter (born 1963)

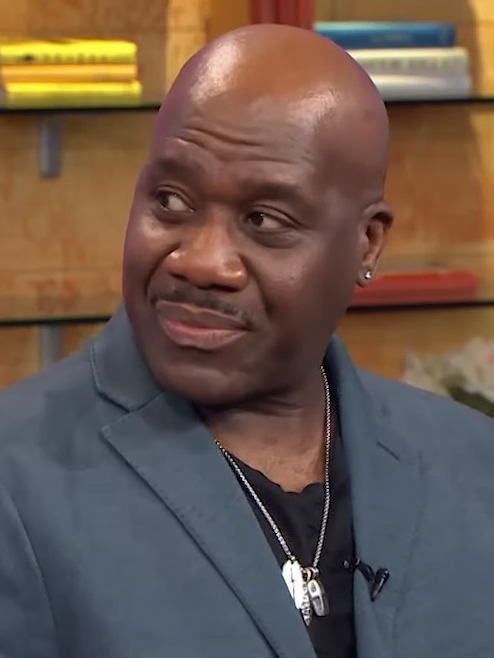
- Downing in 2019

Background information
- Born: Wilfred Downing; November 29, 1963 (age 62); Brooklyn, New York, U.S.
- Genres: R&B, soul, neo soul, jazz
- Occupations: Singer, songwriter
- Instrument: Vocals
- Years active: 1986–present
- Labels: Peak, Hip-O, GRP, Mercury, Motown, PolyGram, Island
- Website: www.willdowning.com

Wilfred "Will" Downing (born November 29, 1963) is an American R&B, soul, neo soul, and jazz singer and songwriter. He has released 22 studio albums.

== Biography ==
=== Early life ===
Downing was born and raised to a working-class family in Bedford-Stuyvesant, Brooklyn. His father was a skycap at a local airport and his mother was a schoolteacher. As a teenager, Downing was a member of a school choir. At age 16, Downing sang demos for publishing houses for songwriters who couldn't sing well, earning $50 each. Downing attended Erasmus Hall High School in Brooklyn, New York, graduating in 1981 along with future Motown Records president Kedar Massenburg. Downing then attended college at Virginia Union University in Richmond, Virginia for one year but dropped out to pursue a music career. His parents were not happy with his decision to leave school; all of his siblings had professional jobs.

=== Career ===
After college, Downing moved back to New York City. In 1983, he was the vocalist for a house music group. He was then a backing vocalist on albums by Jennifer Holliday, Kool & the Gang, Mariah Carey, Gerald Albright, Billy Ocean, Regina Belle and Mica Paris and later sang with Wally "Jump" Junior.

In 1988, Downing signed a recording contract with 4th & B'way Records, and released his first solo album, Will Downing. It included a cover version of the John Coltrane piece, "A Love Supreme", which reached No. 4 on the Billboard Hot Dance Club Songs record chart. Downing switched to Island Records for his second release, Come Together as One (1989). In 1991, he then released A Dream Fulfilled, which was his first commercial success, and included his rendition of Angela Bofill's "I Try".

He switched labels to Mercury Records for his fourth outing, Love's the Place to Be (1993). He remained with Mercury for two more albums, Moods (1995) and Invitation Only (1997), both of which sold well. All the Man You Need, released on Motown Records, received a Grammy Award nomination for Best Traditional R&B Album in 2000. The album included "When You Need Me", a duet single with Chante Moore. In 2002, Downing received the International Association of African-American Music Diamond Award.

He released Love, Lust, & Lies: An Audio Novel in 2010.

In 2014, he was the opening act for Patti LaBelle.

== Artistry ==
Downing is a baritone. He has often been compared to Luther Vandross.

== Personal life ==
From 1987 to 1992, Downing was married to Revonda Mills. In 2002, Downing married singer Audrey Wheeler, who was a member of the R&B group Unlimited Touch.

In December 2006, Downing received a diagnosis of polymyositis, a rare disease occurring most often in black men, in which inflammation causes debilitating muscle weakness. He was hospitalized for three months, used a wheelchair, and lost 100 pounds.

Downing is a spokesperson for the American Stroke Association. On tour, he conducts the charity bowling event Strike Against Stroke to raise funds towards awareness and education in the African American community. The American Heart Association recognized Downing as a celebrity ambassador.

Downing is also a keen photographer, and self-published the coffee table book Unveiled Series I in 2005.

Downing is a member of Omega Psi Phi fraternity.

Downing's daughter, Aron Siobhan Downing, died by suicide on January 11, 2023, at the age of 31. She had suffered from bipolar disorder, had depression and some schizophrenia.

== Discography ==
=== Studio albums ===
Year	Album details	Chart positions					Certifications / Notes
Year	Album details	US	US R&B	US Jazz	US Con. Jazz	UK	Certifications / Notes
1988	Will Downing: Released: March 1988; Label: Island	—	—	—	—	20	BPI: Gold
1989	Come Together as One: Released: October 24, 1989; Label: Island	—	62	—	—	36	
1991	A Dream Fulfilled: Released: March 5, 1991; Label: Island	—	22	—	—	43	
1993	Love's the Place to Be: Released: August 3, 1993; Label: Mercury	166	24	—	—	—	
1995	Moods: Released: November 7, 1995; Label: Mercury	139	23	—	3	—	
1997	Invitation Only: Released: October 28, 1997; Label: Mercury	127	30	—	—	—	Heatseekers No. 5
1998	Pleasures of the Night (with Gerald Albright): Released: September 29, 1998; Label: Verve Forecast	169	36	—	1	—	
2000	All the Man You Need: Released: July 18, 2000; Label: Motown	100	25	—	—	—	
2002	Sensual Journey: Released: May 7, 2002; Label: GRP	90	11	—	2	—	
2003	Emotions: Released: October 14, 2003; Label: GRP	92	9	2	2	—	
2004	Christmas, Love and You: Released: November 9, 2004; Label: GRP	—	40	4	3	—	Holiday No. 37
2005	Soul Symphony: Released: October 5, 2005; Label: GRP	85	18	—	—	—	
2007	After Tonight: Released: October 30, 2007; Label: Peak	37	1	—	—	—	
2009	Classique: Released: June 16, 2009; Label: Peak	22	3	—	—	—	
2010	Love, Lust, & Lies: An Audio Novel: Released: September 14, 2010; Label: Peak	42	11	—	—	—	
2013	Silver: Released: February 8, 2013; Label: Sophisticated Soul / WD Productions	—	62	—	—	—	
2014	Euphoria: Released: March 11, 2014; Label: Sophisticated Soul / WD Productions	—	40	3	2	—	R&B No. 22
2015	Chocolate Drops: Released: March 31, 2015; Label: Sophisticated Soul / WD Productions	—	—	9	2	—	R&B No. 22
2016	Black Pearls: Released: July 8, 2016; Label: Shanachie	—	10	—	—	—	R&B No. 5, Indie No. 12
2017	Soul Survivor: Released: September 22, 2017; Label: Shanachie	—	19	—	—	—	R&B No. 8, Indie No. 33
2018	Promise: Released: November 30, 2018; Label: Shanachie	—	—	—	—	—	
2021	Sophisticated Soul: Released: November 1, 2021; Label: Sophisticated Soul	—	—	—	—	—	
"—" denotes a release that did not chart.

=== EPs ===
- 2021: The Song Garden

=== Compilations ===
Year	Album details	Chart positions	Note
Year	Album details	US R&B	Note
2002	Greatest Love Songs: Released: January 15, 2002; Label: Hip-O / Island	78	
2002	A Love Supreme – The Collection: Released: September 2, 2002 (UK); Label: Spectrum	—	
2006	20th Century Masters - The Millennium Collection: The Best of Will Downing: Released: June 6, 2006; Label: Hip-O / UM^{e}	32	
2014	Collection: Released: November 24, 2014; Label: Concord	—	
"—" denotes a release that did not chart.

=== Singles ===
Year	Single	Peak chart positions		
Year	Single	US Dance	US R&B	UK
1988	"A Love Supreme"	4	77	14
1988	"Sending Out an S.O.S"	―	45	―
1988	"In My Dreams"	―	―	34
1988	"Free"	―	48	58
1989	"Where Is the Love" (with Mica Paris)	―	―	19
1989	"Test of Time"	―	35	67
1990	"Come Together as One"	40	50	48
1990	"Sometimes I Cry"	―	―	―
1990	"Wishing on a Star"	―	―	―
1991	"I Try"	―	13	―
1991	"The World Is a Ghetto"	―	―	83
1991	"I Go Crazy"	―	37	―
1991	"Something's Going On"	―	―	―
1991	"Don't Make Me Wait"	―	―	―
1993	"There's No Living Without You"	―	57	67
1994	"Love's the Place to Be"	―	―	―
1994	"Break Up to Make Up"	―	66	―
1995	"Just to Be with You"	―	―	98
1995	"Sorry, I"	―	45	―
1997	"I Do Believe" (from Cats Don't Dance Soundtrack)	―	―	―
"—" denotes releases that did not chart or were not released in that territory.
