= After the Storm (Norman Brown album) =

Studio album by Norman Brown

Studio album by Norman Brown
- Released: May 17, 1994
- Studio: Winsonic Process & Recording (Beverly Hills, California); Quintus Recording Studios (Hollywood, California)
- Genre: Jazz
- Length: 59:47
- Label: Motown
- Producer: Steve McKeever (exec), Norman Brown

Norman Brown chronology
Just Between Us (1992)	After the Storm (1994)	Better Days Ahead (1996)

Professional ratings
Review scores
Source	Rating
AllMusic	4.5/5 stars

After the Storm is the second album by jazz guitarist Norman Brown, released in 1994 on Motown Records. The album peaked at No. 2 on the Billboard Jazz Albums chart and No. 21 on the Billboard Top Soul Albums chart. After the Storm was also certified Gold in the US by the RIAA.

== Overview ==
The Earth, Wind & Fire Horns section of saxophonist Gary Bias, trumpeter Raymond Lee Brown and trombonist Reggie Young played on the album.

== Covers ==
Brown covered For the Love of You by The Isley Brothers, Any Love by Luther Vandross and Janet Jackson's That's The Way Love Goes upon the album.

== Critical reception ==
After the Storm won a Soul Train Award in the category of Best Jazz Album.

== Track listing ==
No.	Title	Writer(s)	Length
1.	"Take Me There"	Norman Brown	5:09
2.	"After The Storm"	Norman Brown	4:43
3.	"That's The Way Love Goes"	Jimmy Jam, Janet Jackson, Terry Lewis	4:42
4.	"Any Love"	Marcus Miller, Luther Vandross	5:21
5.	"Lydian"	Norman Brown	6:28
6.	"For the Love of You"	Ernie Isley, Marvin Isley, O'Kelly Isley, Ronald Isley, Rudolph Isley, Chris Jasper	5:20
7.	"Trashman"	Norman Brown	5:19
8.	"It Costs To Love"	Norman Brown, Les Colter	4:48
9.	"Let's Come Together"	Norman Brown	5:28
10.	"Acoustic Time"	Norman Brown	2:48
11.	"El Dulce Sol"	Norman Brown	5:06
12.	"Family"	Norman Brown	4:35

== Credits ==
Musicians

- Norman Brown – guitars (1, 2, 5, 8, 9, 11, 12), guitar synth piano (1), backing vocals (1), lead guitar (3, 4, 6, 7), rhythm guitar (3, 4, 6, 7), wah-wah guitar (7), lead vocals (8), programming (9), keyboard bass (9), acoustic guitar (10)
- Brian Simpson – keyboards (1, 7, 11), horn idea (7, 11)
- Herman Jackson – keyboards (2, 4–6, 8, 12), acoustic piano (8), programming (9), keyboard bass (9)
- Crayge Lindesay – keyboards (3), wah-wah guitar (3), bass (3), drum programming (3)
- Gail Johnson – keyboards (4, 6)
- Larry Kimpel – bass (1, 7)
- Freddie Washington – bass (2, 4, 6, 8, 12)
- Tony Dumas – acoustic bass (5)
- James Manning – bass (9)
- George Lopez – bass (11)
- Ricky Lawson – drums (1, 7)
- Land Richards – drums (2, 4–6, 8, 11, 12)
- Alonzo "Scotter" Powell – drums (9)
- Munyungo Jackson – percussion (1, 4–6, 10, 11)
- Gary Bias – alto saxophone (7, 11), tenor saxophone (7, 11)
- Reggie Young – trombone (7, 11)
- Ray Brown – flugelhorn (5, 12), trumpet (7, 11)
- Lynne Fiddmont-Lindsey – backing vocals (1, 4, 6, 8)
- Bridgette Bryant-Fiddmont – backing vocals (4, 6)
- Baby Lee – backing vocals (4, 6)
- Arnold McCuller – backing vocals (4, 6)
- DeNetria Champ – backing vocals (8)

Music arrangements

- Norman Brown – arrangements (1–9, 11, 12), horn arrangements (7, 11),
- Crayge Lindesay – vocal arrangements (1), arrangements (3)
- Steve McKeever – vocal arrangements (1)
- Land Richards – arrangements (4–6, 8)
- Lynne Fiddmont-Lindsey – vocal arrangements (4, 6, 8)
- DeNetria Champ – vocal arrangements (8)

=== Production ===
- Steve McKeever – executive producer
- Norman Brown – producer
- Ralph Sutton – recording, mixing (4, 6–9)
- Malcolm Cecil – mixing (1)
- Brant Biles – additional recording (1–3, 11), mixing (2, 3, 5, 11, 12)
- Robert Margouleff – additional recording (1–3, 11), mixing (2, 3, 5, 11, 12)
- Richard Huredia – assistant engineer
- Nazeeh Islam – assistant engineer
- Bernie Grundman – mastering at Bernie Grundman Mastering (Hollywood, California)
- Bruce Walker – A&R
- Guy Abraham – A&R representative
- Lisa Smith-Craig – A&R production coordinator
- Jonathan Clark – art direction
- Shauna Woods – graphic design
- James Minchin III – photography
- Charles McCoy – hair stylist
- Lalette Littlejohn – make-up
- Barron Dohan – fashion consultant
- It Takes II – wardrobe

== Charts ==
=== Weekly charts ===
Chart (1994)	Peak position
US Billboard 200	140
US Top R&B/Hip-Hop Albums (Billboard)	21
US Top Jazz Albums (Billboard)	2

=== Year-end charts ===
Chart (1994)	Position
US Top R&B/Hip-Hop Albums (Billboard)	87
