= Earth, Wind & Fire Horns =

Horn section for Earth, Wind & Fire

- Genres: Funk, jazz, pop, soul, R&B
- Years active: 1987–present
- Labels: Columbia, Warner Bros., Kalimba, Sanctuary
- Members: Gary Bias; Reggie Young; Bobby Burns Jr.
- Past members: Raymond Lee Brown

The Earth, Wind & Fire Horns is the main horn section for the band Earth, Wind & Fire. The horn section has also played alongside artists such as Whitney Houston, P Diddy, Queen Latifah and Kelly Clarkson. The horn section should not be confused with the EWF Horns which were the first main horn section from 1975 to 1983, later known as the Phenix Horns.

== History ==
The Earth, Wind & Fire Horns were established in 1987 by Maurice White as Earth, Wind & Fire's new horn section. Composed of tenor saxophonist Gary Bias, Reggie Young on trombone and trumpeter Raymond Lee Brown the horn section at first featured on Earth, Wind & Fire's 1990 studio album Heritage.

During 2004 Raymond Lee Brown left the Earth, Wind & Fire Horns to be replaced by Bobby Burns Jr.

== Solo works ==
The Earth, Wind & Fire Horns' trio performed on Whitney Houston's 1990 album I'm Your Baby Tonight. They went on to play on MC Hammer's 1991 Too Legit to Quit. The horn section also performed on jazz guitarist Norman Brown's 1992 album Just Between Us, saxophonist Kirk Whalum's 1993 album Caché', and Salif Keita's 1993 Amen. The Earth, Wind & Fire horns then performed upon jazz guitarist Norman Brown's 1994 album After The Storm, and his 1996 album Better Days Ahead. Additionally horn section members Brown and Young played on Quincy Jones's 1995 Q's Jook Joint and Babyface's 1996 album The Day. On March 6, 1997, the Earth, Wind & Fire horns played at Ghana's 40th anniversary of independence gala held in its capital city of Accra alongside artistes such as Miriam Makeba and Joseph Hill of Culture.

The Earth, Wind & Fire Horns later featured on British girl group Cleopatra's 1998 album Comin' Atcha!, Puff Daddy's 1999 album Forever and Lionel Richie's 2000 album Renaissance. They also played on guitarist Paul Jackson Jr. 2003 album Still Small Voice and Queen Latifah's 2004 The Dana Owens Album. Additionally, horn section members Bias and Young featured on Anita Baker's 2004 album My Everything and Queen Latifah's 2007 album Trav'lin' Light. The Earth, Wind & Fire horns also played on Kelly Clarkson's 2017 album Meaning of Life.
