= Second Chances (album) =

Studio album by Jessy J
- Released: 10 September 2013
- Studios: JHL Sound (Pacific Palisades, California); The Village Recorder (Los Angeles, California); Vella Recording Studios (West Hills, California); Cane River Studios (Sherman Oaks, California).
- Genre: Contemporary jazz
- Label: Heads Up
- Producers: Jessy J: Jeff Lorber; Johnny Britt; Jimmy Haslip; Facundo; Bryant Siono

Jessy J chronology
Hot Sauce (2011)	Second Chances (2013)	My One and Only One (2015)

Second Chances is the fourth album released by smooth jazz artist Jessy J. Released on September 10, 2013, it debuted at No. 2 on the Billboard Jazz Albums chart. The album features guest writers, co-producers and performances by Norman Brown, Jeff Lorber, Jimmy Haslip, Johnny Britt, and Joe Sample. In addition to eight original songs, Second Chances includes Jessy J's reimagining of classics by Roberta Flack "Feel Like Making Love" and Sergio Mendes' samba "Magalenha".

== Reception ==
All About Jazz rated the album four stars and remarked, "Despite this being her fourth album, she truly seems to have made the most of a second chance to distinguish herself from a crowded field of players and by getting back to basics Second Chances is reason enough to give her a second listen."

Professional ratings
Review scores
Source	Rating
All About Jazz	4/5 stars

== Track listing ==
Second Chances track listing
No.	Title	Length
1.	"Listen 2 the Groove" (featuring Jeff Lorber)	4:58
2.	"Second Chances" (featuring Norman Brown)	3:43
3.	"Feel Like Makin' Love"	3:35
4.	"Magalenha"	4:26
5.	"Tango for Two"	4:16
6.	"Dos"	4:14
7.	"La Luna Feliz"	3:25
8.	"Double Trouble" (featuring Jeff Lorber & Jimmy Haslip)	5:15
9.	"Mambo Gumbo" (featuring Johnny Britt)	3:06
10.	"Twice"	4:45
Total length:		41:43

== Personnel ==
=== Musicians ===
- Jessy J – vocals (1, 3, 4, 7), tenor saxophone (1, 2, 4, 5, 7–10), arrangements (1–5, 7, 8, 10), flute (3, 4, 6, 7), alto saxophone (4), baritone saxophone (4, 9), soprano saxophone (6)
- Jeff Lorber – keyboards (1, 4, 5, 8), arrangements (1, 4, 5, 8), strings (3), guitars (4, 5, 8)
- Johnny Britt – additional vocals (1), vocal arrangements (1), vocals (2, 9, 10), keyboards (2, 10), drum programming (2, 10), trumpet (2), arrangements (2, 10)
- Norman Jackson – keyboards (3, 7, 9), strings (7)
- Dwight Sills – guitars (1)
- Norman Brown – guitar (2)
- Michael Angel – rhythm guitar (2), guitars (10)
- Tim Stewart – guitars (3, 7, 9), arrangements (3)
- Michael Thompson – guitars (4, 5, 8)
- Facundo Monty – guitar (6), vocals (6)
- Jimmy Haslip – bass (1, 4, 5, 8), backing vocals (4), arrangements (4, 5, 8)
- Frank Abraham – bass (2, 10)
- Bryant Siono – bass (3, 6, 7, 9), keyboards (6), electric guitar (6)
- Anthony Moore – drums (1, 5)
- Charles Streeter – drums (3, 6, 7, 9), percussion (7, 9)
- Michael White – drums (4)
- Richie Gajate-Garcia – percussion (2, 10)
- Nancy Lyons – chorus vocals (4)
- Eric Mondragon – backing vocals (7)

=== Production ===
- Jessy J – producer
- Jeff Lorber – producer (1, 4, 5, 8), recording (1, 4, 5, 8), mixing (1, 4, 5, 8)
- Johnny Britt – producer (2, 10), recording (2, 9, 10)
- Jimmy Haslip – producer (4, 5, 8)
- Facundo Monty – producer (6)
- Bryant Siono – recording (3, 6, 7, 9), producer (6)
- Seth Presant – recording (2–10)
- Dave Rideau – mixing (2, 3, 6, 9, 10)
- David Darlington – mastering at Bass Hit Studios (New York City, New York)
- Lorien Babajian – package design
- Tom Keller – photography
- Stewart Coxhead and International Music Management – management
