= Still Small Voice =

Still Small Voice or variants may refer to:

- "A still small voice", a phrase describing a manifestation of God to Elijah from 1 Kings 19:12

== Books ==
- A Still Small Voice, a 2000 novel by John Reed
- After the Fire, a Still Small Voice, a 2009 novel by author Evie Wyld
- The Still, Small Voice of Trumpets, a 1968 work by Lloyd Biggle Jr.
- "The Still Small Voice", a novelette by Robert Silverberg

== Film and TV ==
- Still Small Voices , a 2007 ghost film
- A Still Small Voice (film), a 2023 American documentary film
- A Still Small Voice (Task), an episode of the American crime drama television series Task
- "That Still Small Voice", an episode of the American television series Once Upon a Time
- "A Still Small Voice", an episode of British television series Oh, Brother!
- "A Still Small Voice", an episode of French television series Versailles

== Music ==
- Still Small Voice (album), a 2003 album by Paul Jackson Jr.
- Still Small Voice (band), a Japanese band featured in the manga series Kodocha
- "O still, small voice of calm", a phrase in the hymn "Dear Lord and Father of Mankind"
- "Still Small Voice", a song from Randy Stonehill's album Celebrate This Hearbeat
- "Still Small Voice", a song by the Strawbs from Hero and Heroine
- "A Still Small Voice", a song by Perry Como from When You Come to the End of the Day
