= The Passage (Andy Narell album) =

Studio album by Andy Narell
- Released: March 23, 2004
- Studio: Calypsociation, Paris, France
- Genre: Jazz
- Length: 58:36
- Label: Heads Up
- Producer: Andy Narell

Andy Narell chronology
Live in South Africa (2001)	The Passage (2004)	Tatoom (2007)

Professional ratings
Review scores
Source	Rating
Allmusic	3/5 stars

The Passage is an album by steelpan player Andy Narell that was released in 2004 and recorded with the group Calypsociation.

== Track listing ==
All tracks are composed by Andy Narell.

1. "The Passage" – 10:13
2. "Song for Mia" - 8:05
3. "The Long Way Back" - 5:57
4. "Sea of Stories" - 9:17
5. "Mabouya" - 6:37
6. "Dee Mwa Wee" - 7:17
7. "Coffee Street" - 11:10

== Personnel ==
- Andy Narell - tenor, double second, and quaduet steel pans

=== Bandleaders ===
- Mathieu Borgne - drums, percussion
- Laurent Lalsingué - tenor, double second

=== Guest soloists ===
- Michael Brecker – tenor sax ("Song for Mia")
- Paquito D'Rivera – alto sax ("Mabouya")
- Hugh Masekela – flugelhorn ("Dee Mwa Wee")

=== Other instrumentalists ===
- tenor: Olivier Wiren, Clement Bazin, Stéphanie N'Doye-Chevret, Sonia Descamps
- double tenor: Gwendel Wiren
- double second: Laurence Guerrini, Traci-Leigh Scarlett, Melodie Hammel, Etienne Huguenot, Delphine Denis, Marie Pelletier, Alice Courbrant
- triple guitar: Julie Goldstein, Magda Belaïd
- double guitar: Coline Hammel, Thomas Calavera
- 4 cello: Patrick Thine, Frédéric Deshuis, Agathe Delaporte, Donald Gellez
- tenor bass: Olivier Thomas, Jocelyne Baillon
- bass: José Babeu, Philippe Goldstein, Isabel Encinias, Nathalie Clérault, Smaïl-Smao Mekki, Bruno François
- percussion: Laurent Coatalen, Pernell Saturnino, Philippe Malique
- tuner: Darren Dyke
