= University of California Jazz Ensembles =

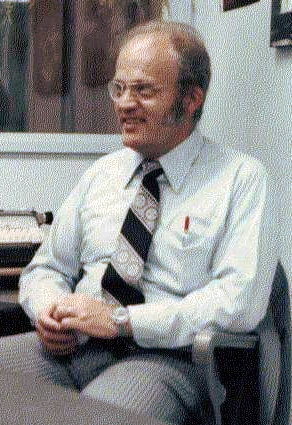
- Dr. David W. "Doc" Tucker; Director 1969–1985

Background information
- Origin: Berkeley, California
- Genres: Big bands, Combos, Instruction; Pacific Coast Collegiate Jazz Festival
- Years active: 1967– present
- Past members: Michael Wolff, Andy Narell, Susan Muscarella, Dave Le Febvre, Dave Meros, Kent Reed, Bill Aron, Dave Kopf, Cheryl Pyle, Scott Latham, Nic Ten Broeck
- Website: ucjazz.berkeley.edu

The University of California Jazz Ensembles, also known as the UC Jazz Ensembles, UC Jazz, or UCJE, is the student jazz organization founded in 1967 on the University of California, Berkeley, campus. Founded in 1967, it comprises one or more big bands, numerous jazz combos, a vocal jazz ensemble, an alumni big band, and instructional classes. With a mission statement to foster a community for the performance, study, and promotion of jazz at U.C. Berkeley, its Wednesday Night big band provides free concerts every Thursday noon on Lower Sproul Plaza, its various units perform throughout the San Francisco Bay Area including area high schools, travel to collegiate jazz festivals, and perform overseas, and for many years it sponsored the annual Pacific Coast Jazz Festival. It also provides master classes by its instructors and clinics by prominent guest artists. It has nurtured numerous musicians who have become professional jazz musicians and educators. UC Jazz Ensembles is one of three groups, with the Cal (marching) Band and UC Choral Ensembles, forming Student Musical Activities (SMA), a department within Cal Performances on the U.C. Berkeley campus. Its members are primarily U.C. Berkeley undergraduate and graduate students, representing many academic disciplines.

== History ==
=== Beginnings ===
Although a big band had existed briefly on the U.C. Berkeley campus in the late 1950s, the long-lasting UC Jazz Ensembles itself had its beginnings in 1966. The response was heavily loaded with guitar players and the project was put on hold. In 1967, Bob Docken, the first trombone player with the Cal Band and a respondent to the ad, followed Leslie Golden's lead and placed his own ad in the Daily Californian. The response was more favorable and with Rick Penner, a trumpet player in the Cal Band, rehearsals of the big band began on Sunday mornings in the Cal Band band room.

The first concert of the then-named ASUC Jazz Ensembles was in May, 1968, an event heralded by an article in The Daily Californian. The article included commentary by educator Dr. Herb Wong, Ph.D, a disc jockey at KJAZ-FM radio, jazz historian, jazz critic, album liner author, and jazz festival adjudicator, who was to form a lasting supportive bond with the UC Jazz Ensembles and a strong friendship based on common interests and mutual admiration with soon-to-be-named director David W. Tucker.

The UC Jazz Ensembles became an official student organization under the auspices of the Associated Students of the University California in 1971 with Dr. David W. "Doc" Tucker as its first director. Pianist Susan Muscarella was appointed to the position of Associate Director in 1974. Student interest led to the formation of three big bands, all under the direction of Tucker, with the Wednesday Night Band being the premier group.

Tucker also reached out to Milton Williams, the director of choral ensembles under student activities. Several jazz vocal groups were created, some of which performed with the UC Jazz Ensembles at various concerts, notably the spring concert.

=== Maturity ===
Several major events signified the maturity of the organization. By March 1971, Tucker believed that the Wednesday Night Band had reached a sufficient level of musicality and took it to the first jazz festival in which the UC Jazz Ensembles participated, the prestigious Reno Jazz Festival, the band being housed at the "legendary" B-Gay Motor Lodge. The guest artist at the festival was vibist Gary Burton and the band performed on Friday, March 19.

In the spring of 1972, the Wednesday Night Band traveled to southern California and performed at its first Pacific Coast Collegiate Jazz Festival, the Northridge Collegiate Jazz Festival, part of the American College Jazz Festival, performing on March 25, 1972. The Wednesday Night Band returned to the Reno Jazz Festival, performing on March 23, 1973. On this trip, the band was housed at the Towne House Motor Lodge, the B-Gay, to the disappointment of band members, being sold out.

In 1974, after the ensembles began hosting the Pacific Coast Collegiate Jazz Festival, the Wednesday Night Band won 3rd place, having performed on April 27. This placed them among the elite bands of the west coast, able to compete with the Los Angeles college bands notorious for seating "ringers", professional studio musicians taking a minimum of courses.

=== International tours ===
The first of its international tours occurred in the summer of 1979. The Wednesday Night Band embarked upon a four-week tour of Europe, playing several major jazz festivals in Finland, Sweden, Norway, Denmark, and Poland. In the summer of 1981 the band traveled to the Far East, touring Tokyo, Kyoto, Nara, and Osaka. In 1984, it was invited to tour again in Japan, and in addition to repeating the tour of central Honshu, they performed a live broadcast on FM Tokyo. Notably, the 1979 European Tour band appeared on the same bill as Dizzy Gillespie, and the 1981 Japan Tour band performed in, among other venues, Korakuen Stadium, home of the Tokyo Giants baseball team. This was most likely the largest UC Jazz performance venue in its history.

=== International associations ===
In the 1990s, the UC Jazz Ensembles extended their international associations by building relationships with foreign jazz groups. Visiting bands have performed either in evening concerts on the Berkeley campus or at the weekly Thursday noon-time venue in Lower Sproul Plaza. Such bands included The Australian Performing Arts Unit Big Band, The Rare Sounds Jazz Ensemble from Japan, and The Dunedin City Jazz Orchestra from New Zealand.

=== Directors ===
In 1984 Tucker took a sabbatical and he announced his retirement in 1985. Susan Muscarella became the director, appointing saxophonist Dave Le Febvre as Associate Director. Dave LeFebvre and Robert Calonico were co-directors between 1989 and 1995, Michael Stryker was director in the 1996 school year, and Bevan Manson was director from 1998 to 2000. The big bands and combo programs continued the ambitious programs begun under Tucker, winning awards at jazz festivals throughout California. After years of lobbying of the academic department of music, music majors can earn academic credits as members of the UC Jazz Ensembles.

The UC Jazz Ensembles expanded to include seven part-time instructors, creating the structure that remains in place. Each instructor coaches one of the combos or big bands as well as conducting master classes in his own instrument. The UC Jazz Ensembles is currently directed by drummer Ted Moore.

=== Dr. David W. "Doc" Tucker ===
Dr. David W. "Doc" Tucker (1929–2003) was the force behind the success of the UC Jazz Ensembles and is inextricably associated with it. A native of Cerro Gordo, a small town in central Illinois, he was graduated from the University of Illinois with a B.S. (1950) and M.S. (1951) in Music Education. In 1965, he both began teaching music at Luther Burbank High School in Sacramento and began studies toward a doctorate in Music Education at U.C. Berkeley. In 1966, at the request of the Sacramento school district, Tucker assumed the position of Director of Bands at Sacramento City College. While in Sacramento, Tucker played trombone in the pit bands at Lake Tahoe casinos. He completed his Ed.D. at Berkeley in 1969.

In the fall of 1968, Tucker was hired as an arranger and composer for the Cal Marching Band. He was appointed Associate Director in 1969. His responsibilities with the Cal Band included rehearsing, auditioning prospective new members, and directing on the football field opposite director James Berdahl. For the 1971 season, during Berdahl's sabbatical year in Japan, Tucker was named Acting Director.

In 1969, he was asked by members of the ASUC Jazz Ensembles affiliated with the Cal Band, most notably Docken, to direct the big band in his spare time, a role Tucker, with his jazz trombone background, eagerly accepted. His personal skills led numerous Cal Band musicians to join the big band, with the result that personnel issues were never to be a problem again.

At the end of the 1971 season, Tucker left the Cal Band to accept the newly created position of Director of the UC Jazz Ensembles under Cal's musical activities department. The band faced continual financial hurdles, with minimal funding from the university and low staff salaries, but prospered and grew in influence and popularity in the campus community. Within a couple years, with the increasing interest of more student musicians to join the big band, two additional big bands were created, the Tuesday Night Band and the Thursday Night Band, with the original big band, composed of the most skilled of the jazz musicians, named the Wednesday Night Band.

It continued to expand its programming, adding combos to the big bands and, beginning in 1974 sponsoring the Pacific Coast Collegiate Jazz Festival (PCCJF). The organization now had two sets of student administrators, the officers of the band itself and those running the PCCJF. Under Tucker's guidance, the PCCJF, later called the Pacific Coast Jazz Festival because of its inclusion of competition among high school bands, became the largest collegiate jazz festival in the country in terms of number of student participants and number of musical groups. These grew to include big bands, combos, and vocal ensembles.

Under Tucker, the various bands began to perform at various venues on the U.C. Berkeley campus and in the Bay Area. These include the Thursday noontime concerts on Lower Sproul Plaza, in the Bear's Lair, at a spring concert, at the Oakland Art Museum, and for official receptions and parties at the university president's home on the U.C. Berkeley campus. An annual spring concert, entitled "Spring Thing" included various bands from the UC Jazz Ensembles, vocal jazz groups from UC Choral Ensembles, and guest stars. Pianist George Duke was featured at the first Spring Thing in 1971.

Tucker directed the UC Jazz Ensembles until he retired in 1985 to pursue other interests, having mentored, befriended, supported, and provided performing as well as management opportunities for hundreds of musicians. His student musicians remember "Doc" fondly, how he served as a mentor to many and always took time to advise, lend a hand, or just chat. The organization has proven to be an effective recruitment tool for U.C. Berkeley, with many high school musicians interested in attending U.C. Berkeley but also interested in performing jazz finding it to fit both interests. The PCCJF itself promoted U.C. Berkeley, surprisingly to many high school students attracted to the campus mainly because of its academic renown, as a jazz education and performance center.

== Pacific Coast (Collegiate) Jazz Festival ==
Following the trips by the Wednesday Night Band to the Northridge Jazz Festival and the renowned Reno Jazz Festival, Tucker embarked on hosting the UC Jazz Ensembles own collegiate jazz festival. The Pacific region festival, which had been hosted by Cal State Northridge in Northridge, California, was part of the American College Jazz Festival, which existed from 1967 to 1973. When the jazz group at Cal State Northridge opted to discontinue their being host, Tucker volunteered to assume the hosting responsibilities on the U.C. Berkeley campus.

The logistical, funding, and planning demands were substantial, but beginning in 1974, the UC Jazz Ensembles began to annually sponsor the Pacific Coast Collegiate Jazz Festival or PCCJF. The guest artist for this first festival was flutist Hubert Laws. At the Saturday night awards and concert presentation, the Wednesday Night Band was augmented with additional French horns, strings, harp, and other instruments in their performance with Laws.

The PCCJF, as the other festivals of the American College Jazz Festival, was a competitive gathering for big bands, combos, and jazz vocal ensembles. Because it also came to include high school bands, it was later renamed the Pacific Coast Jazz Festival.

In addition to the student officers of UC Jazz, an entire slate of officers was created to administer the PCCJF. Both slates were guided by Tucker.

The PCCJF provided multiple venues on the University of California campus over several days for adjudicated performances, culminating in an awards ceremony on Saturday night in Zellerbach Auditorium, clinics led by the adjudicators and guest artists, and a performance at the awards ceremony by guest artists performing with the Wednesday Night Band.

Among the adjudicators has been Dr. Herb Wong, associated with the UC Jazz Ensembles since its beginning. He also supports alumni of the program, providing, for example, liner notes for their recordings

The PCCJF proved to be an effective recruitment tool for U.C. Berkeley, with many high school musicians who performed at the PCCJF later matriculating on the U.C. Berkeley campus. Such include pianist Michael Wolff, saxophonist former Associate Director Dave Le Febvre, and first trumpet Paul Giorsetto. Other high school musicians obtained recognition at the PCCJF, including trumpeter Jon Faddis from Pleasant Hill High School and vocalist Barbara Garcia from South San Francisco High School.

Over the years guest artists at the PCCJF have included numerous jazz luminaries. These include tenor saxophonist Sonny Rollins (1977), The Crusaders (1977), trumpeter Freddy Hubbard, flutist Hubert Laws (1974), The Tonight Show drummer Ed Shaughnessy, pianist Patrice Rushen, pianist Bill Evans, pianist Earl "Fatha" Hines, trombonist Bill Watrous, the Toshiko Akiyoshi – Lew Tabackin Big Band, alto saxophonist Richie Cole, who also performed with the band at the Rio Vista Jazz Festival in the 1970s, vocalist Bobby McFerrin (1982), bassist Christian McBride (1997), saxophonist Joe Lovano (also 1997), trumpeter Jon Faddis (1998), trombonist Slide Hampton (also 1998), bassist Jimmy Heath (also 1998!), saxophonist Michael Brecker (1999), pianist Chick Corea, and saxophonist Joe Henderson.

The last student-run festival was held on the Berkeley campus in the 2000s.

== Prominent alumni in music ==
The UC Jazz Ensembles has nurtured numerous musicians who have embarked upon jazz careers, as performers, band leaders, performers’ agents, and educators. These include pianist Michael Wolff, who has worked with Airto, the Thad Jones-Mel Lewis Orchestra, Sonny Rollins, Cal Tjader, Jean-Luc Ponty, Cannonball Adderley, Herbie Mann, among others, was the musical director for many years for vocalist Nancy Wilson, and was the director of the house band for The Arsenio Hall Show; Andy Narell, a pianist with the UC Jazz Ensembles who was the first widely recognized jazz player on the steelpan or "steel drums"; pianist Susan Muscarella, the founder of the Jazzschool in Berkeley; bass guitarist, who played bass trombone and tuba with UC Jazz Ensembles, Dave Meros; pianist Steve Carter; saxophonist Dave Le Febvre; flutist Cheryl Pyle; Chris Gillock and his blues group, Mr. G and the Mystery Band; bassist Dave Kopf and Octobop; drummer Scott Latham, currently residing in Japan where he has performed and recorded with, among others, Eric Miyashiro; saxophonist Bill Aron of the San Francisco Saxophone Quartet; drummer Kent Reed, who also performs in symphony orchestras; composer/arranger/valve trombonist Jules Rowell of the Jules Rowell Quintet; pianist Murray Low of the Wayne Wallace Latin Jazz Quintet; guitarist Harold Hansen; trombonist and composer Nic Ten Broeck (a classmate at Berkeley High School with Michael Wolff); Jeff Zias of the Touch of Brass big band; trumpet Russ Button of the Horns A Plenty brass band; vocalist and agent Linda Goldstein; college music educators Dave and Don Megill, and others. Many of the instructors at the Jazzschool were themselves members of the UC Jazz Ensembles.

== Discography ==
Among its recordings, the 1979 European Tour band recorded "UC Berkeley Jazz Ensemble Vol. 1, 1979" at the College for Recording Arts in San Francisco, and the 1981 Japan Tour band recorded "Orange Blossom Special" at Polydor Studios in Tokyo, Japan.

== Current organizations ==
=== UC Jazz ===
Current instructors and the groups they lead are: Ted Moore, Director of UC Jazz Ensembles, Percussion, Advanced Combo and Intermediate Combo; Steve Campos, Trumpet, Big Band; Frank Martin, Piano, Advanced Combo; Glenn Richman, Bass, Intermediate Combo; Marty Wehner, Trombone, Intermediate Combo; Dann Zinn, Saxophone, Advanced Combo; Joseph Escobar, Piano/Trumpet, Beginning Combo; Joshua Perline, Bass/Guitar/Saxophone, Beginning Combo; Jessie Salas, Saxophone, Beginning Combo; Owen Chen, Guitar/Drums, Beginning Combo.

=== The Cal Alumni Big Band ===
Under the management of Sam Lind and the direction of Paul Siebel, the Cal Alumni Big Band has rehearsed and performed at various Bay Area venues for more than two decades. It regularly donates income derived from its frequent public performances toward support of UC Jazz programs.

=== The UC Jazz Alumni Club ===
The alumni club was formed in the 1980s, with George Gaebler one of the primary driving forces, to keep graduates and staff of U.C. Berkeley who had performed in the UC Jazz Ensembles connected to each other and the program. It sends out periodic newsletters and emails to members. Its current president is Sam Lind. The UC Alumni Jazz Band has a provisional website with one CD listed: http://calumbigband.8m.com/ Contact Sam Lind for other CDs and how to get copies

=== The UC Jazz Club ===
In reaction to budget cuts for education from the State of California, alumni and members of the UC Jazz Ensembles formed the UC Jazz Club. Its goal is to support the work of the organization by acquiring private and corporate funding to purchase teaching materials, sheet music, instruments, studio equipment, and recordings for the Duke Ellington Memorial Library.
