= Just Chillin' =

Studio album by Norman Brown
- Released: 2 July 2002
- Studio: Alpha Studios (Burbank, California); Funky Joint Studios (Sherman Oaks, California); Schnee Studios (North Hollywood, California); Sunset Sound (Hollywood, California); Brandon's Way Recording (Los Angeles, California); In Your Ear Studio (Northridge, California); Studio Zed (Granada Hills, California); Crystal Clear Studios (Sacramento, California); Axis Studios and The Studio (Philadelphia, Pennsylvania); rudimentary (New York, NY)
- Genre: Smooth jazz
- Length: 44:47
- Label: Warner Bros.
- Producer: Paul Brown; Norman Brown; D.O.A; Vikter Duplaix; James Poyser

Norman Brown chronology
Celebration (1999)	Just Chillin' (2002)	West Coast Coolin' (2004)

Just Chillin' is the fifth studio album by American guitarist and singer Norman Brown, released in July 2002 through Warner Bros. Records. The album was produced by Paul Brown and features guest vocal performances by Miki Howard, Michael McDonald, Chanté Moore and Debi Nova. Guest instrumentalists include Rick Braun, percussionists Lenny Castro and Paulinho da Costa, Jerry Hey, Pino Palladino on bass, James Poyser, and Bill Reichenbach Jr. on trombone. The album contains six tracks written or co-written by Brown, a cover version of Janet Jackson's "Let's Wait Awhile" and three additional songs.

In the United States, Just Chillin' reached peak positions of number 198 on the Billboard 200, number two on Billboard's Top Contemporary Jazz Albums chart, number six on the Top Heatseekers chart, number three on the Top Jazz Albums chart and number 50 on the Top R&B Albums chart. In 2003, the album earned Brown the Grammy Award for Best Pop Instrumental Album.

== Composition ==
Just Chillin', produced by Paul Brown, contains ten tracks totaling approximately 45 minutes in length. The album has a relaxed mood generated by Brown's "gentle riffs and chords", a quality continued from his previous studio album Celebration (1999). Tracks include "light grooving instrumentals" and "unhurried romantic forays" with vocals by Miki Howard, Michael McDonald, Chanté Moore and Debi Nova. Backing vocals are supplied by Maya Azucena and Leela James. According to Brown, these guest vocalists marked his "introduction to vocals". Guest instrumentalists include: Rick Braun, percussionists Lenny Castro and Paulinho da Costa, Jerry Hey, Pino Palladino on bass, James Poyser, and Bill Reichenbach Jr. on trombone.

"The Feeling I Get", "Just Chillin'", and the Latin-influenced "Dancing in the House", are all original compositions by Brown; the latter two are considered moderately upbeat. "Night Drive", "Won't You Stay", and "In My Life" are also credited in part to Brown. "Night Drive", co-written by Phil Davis, contains a trumpet performance by Braun. In addition to Brown, "Won't You Stay" was co-written by Vikter Duplaix and James Poyser; "In My Life" was co-written by Edwin Lugo. The album also includes "Feeling the Way" (Derek Allen, Juanita Wynn), John Stoddart's "I Still Believe", a cover version of Janet Jackson's "Let's Wait Awhile" (Melanie Andrews, Jackson, Jimmy Jam, Terry Lewis), and Christopher Bolden's "Not Like You Do."

== Reception ==
Professional ratings
Review scores
Source	Rating
AllMusic	2/5 stars

Just Chillin' received less than favorable critical reception. Allmusic's Matt Collar awarded the album two out of five stars and noted his preference for Brown's 1994 studio album After the Storm. Collar thought that Brown incorporated too many programmed drums and "mid-tempo jams", producing more "urban and gritty" tracks than his other instrumental albums. He compared "The Feeling I Get" to "instrumental Maxwell" and called Janet Jackson's "Let's Wait Awhile" a standout track which reflects Brown's "overall vision to turn jazz to pop and vice versa". Chris Walker of JazzTimes also noted the album's laid-back pace ("almost too relaxed") and thought it lacked Brown's "trademark zestfulness". Walker complimented the vocalists' performances, which produced a "pleasant, soulful aura", but felt they were "far removed" from Brown. He wrote that "Just Chillin'" and "Dancing in the House" displayed Brown's acumen; Walker also complimented "Night Drive", in part because of Braun's trumpet performance, and considered "Let's Wait Awhile" the highlight of the album. In 2003, the album earned Brown the Grammy Award for Best Pop Instrumental Album.

== Track listing ==
No.	Title	Writer(s)	Length
1.	"The Feeling I Get"	Norman Brown	4:51
2.	"Just Chillin'"	Brown	4:29
3.	"Feeling the Way"	Derek Allen, Juanita Wynn	4:17
4.	"Night Drive"	Brown, Phil Davis	4:07
5.	"I Still Believe"	John Stoddart	4:02
6.	"Dancing in the House"	Brown	4:23
7.	"Let's Wait a While"	Melanie Andrews, Janet Jackson, Jimmy Jam, Terry Lewis	4:39
8.	"Won't You Stay"	Brown, Vikter Duplaix, James Poyser	3:55
9.	"In My Life"	Brown, Edwin Lugo	5:28
10.	"Not Like You Do"	Christopher Bolden	4:36

Track listing adapted from AllMusic.

== Personnel ==
Musicians

- Norman Brown – guitars (1, 2, 4–10), acoustic lead guitar (3), vocals (6), arrangements (9), backing vocals (10)
- Herman Jackson – keyboards (1, 2)
- Paul Brown – programming (2, 4, 5, 7, 10)
- D.O.A. – keyboards (3, 9), programming (3, 9), guitars (3), bass (3, 9), arrangements (3, 9)
- Phil Davis – keyboards (4), drum programming (4), arrangements (4)
- John Stoddart – keyboards (5), drums (5), backing vocals (5), arrangements (5)
- James Poyser – keyboards (6, 8)
- Vikter Duplaix – programming (6, 8)
- Chris Bolden – keyboards (7, 10), programming (7), drums (7), arrangements (7, 10), drum programming (10)
- Ricky Peterson – keyboards (7)
- Tony Maiden – guitars (1, 2)
- John Jubu Smith – acoustic guitar (7)
- Alex Al – bass (1, 2)
- Pino Palladino – bass (6, 8)
- Lil' John Roberts – drums (1, 2)
- Lenny Castro – percussion (1, 2)
- Paulinho da Costa – percussion (4, 5)
- Pablo Batista – percussion
- Larry Williams – saxophones (2)
- Bill Reichenbach Jr. – trombone (2)
- Jerry Hey – horn arrangements (1, 2), flugelhorn (2)
- Rick Braun – flugelhorn (4), trumpet (4)
- Chanté Moore – vocals (3)
- Juanita Wynn – backing vocals (3)
- Michael McDonald – vocals (5)
- Debi Nova – vocals (8)
- Sherree Ford – backing vocals (8, 10)
- Leela James – backing vocals (8)
- Maya Azucena – backing vocals (9)
- Jeni Fujita – backing vocals (9)
- Edwin Lugo – backing vocals (9)
- Miki Howard – vocals (10)

Production

- Paul Brown – producer (1, 2, 4, 5, 7, 10), mixing (1, 2, 4, 7), engineer
- Norman Brown – producer (3, 9), co-producer (6, 8)
- D.O.A. – producer (3, 9)
- Bob Brockman – additional producer (3, 9), mixing (3, 9)
- Yaron Fuchs – additional producer (3, 9), mixing (3, 9)
- Vikter Duplaix – producer (6, 8)
- James Poyser – producer (6, 8)
- Jan Fairchild – mixing (5, 6, 8, 10)
- Anthony Bell – engineer
- Bo Boddie – engineer
- Timothy Day – engineer
- Ryan Moys – engineer
- Don Murray – engineer
- Bill Schnee – engineer
- Jon Smeltz – engineer
- Krystof Zizka – engineer
- Erik Zobler – engineer, digital editing
- Doug Boehm – assistant engineer
- Wayne Holmes – assistant engineer
- Victor McCoy – assistant engineer
- Josean Posey – assistant engineer
- Dragan "D.C." Capor – digital editing
- Robert Hadley – mastering
- Doug Sax – mastering
- The Mastering Lab (Hollywood, California) – mastering location
- Dana Watson – production coordination
- Lexy Shroyer – production coordination
- Gregory Gilmer – art direction, design
- Stephen Lam – photography
- Bruce Kramer – management

Credits adapted from Allmusic.

== Chart performance ==
In the United States, Just Chillin' reached peak positions of number 198 on the Billboard 200, number two on Billboard's Top Contemporary Jazz Albums chart, number six on the Top Heatseekers chart, number three on the Top Jazz Albums chart and number 50 on the Top R&B Albums chart. The album remained on the Billboard 200 for one week, the Top Jazz Albums chart for fifty weeks and the Top R&B Albums chart for eight weeks. In 2003, Just Chillin' re-entered the Top Contemporary Jazz Albums chart at number 22. The 31 May 2003 issue of Billboard, which featured the annual "Jazz Spotlight" and covered jazz music between the 7 December 2002 and 3 May 2003 issues of the magazine, included the album at number eight on its list of the "Top Contemporary Jazz Albums".

Chart (2002)	Peak position
U.S. Billboard 200	198
U.S. Top Contemporary Jazz Albums	2
U.S. Top Heatseekers	6
U.S. Top Jazz Albums	3
U.S. Top R&B Albums	50
