= My One and Only One =

My One And Only One

Studio album by Jessy J
- Released: 26 May 2015
- Studio: Funky Joint Studios (Sherman Oaks, California); On The Level Studio, Bluezoux Studio and Siono Recording Studio (Los Angeles, California); Entourage Studios (North Hollywood, California).
- Genre: Contemporary jazz
- Label: Shanachie Entertainment
- Producer: Jessy J; Paul Brown; Michael Ripoll

Jessy J chronology
Second Chances (2013)	My One And Only One (2015)	California Christmas (2016)

My One And Only One is the fifth album released by smooth jazz artist Jessy J. It released in 2015. The album features special guest, Grammy winning keyboardist Gregg Karukas and Paul Brown. Highlights include Jessy's sensitive re-imaginings of the Cure's "Lovesong", Toni Braxton's "You're Makin' Me High", and the R&B classic "Strawberry Letter 23".

== Track listing ==
1. "Una Mas" (Jessy J, Paul Brown, Lew Lang) – 3:37
2. "My One And Only One" (Jessy J, Paul Brown, Lew Lang) – 4:14
3. "Lovesong" (Simon Gallup, Roger O'Donnell, Robert Smith, Porl Thompson, Lol Tolhurst, Boris Williams) – 5:16
4. "The Tango Boy" (Jessy J, Paul Brown) – 4:26
5. "Paraiso Magico" (Jessy J, Michael Ripoll) – 3:52
6. "'Back to the Basics" (Jessy J, Thiago Pinhero) – 6:15
7. "You're Makin' Me High" (Toni Braxton, Kenneth "Babyface" Edmunds, Bryce Wilson) – 6:23
8. "Siempre" (Jessy J, Janis Liebhart) – 4:53
9. "Cuba" (Jessy J, Thiago Pinhero) – 4:28
10. "Strawberry Letter 23" (Shuggie Otis) – 4:39

== Personnel ==
=== Musicians ===
- Jessy J – tenor saxophone (1–4, 6, 7, 9, 10), arrangements (1–9), flute (5, 8, 10), vocals (5, 8), alto saxophone (10)
- Gregg Karukas – keyboards (1–4), strings (1–4)
- Ruslan Sirota – acoustic piano (5, 7, 8), arrangements (8)
- Michael Ripoll – keyboards (5, 10), programming (5, 10), guitars (5, 8, 10), vocals (5), arrangements (5), rhythm guitar (7)
- Norman Jackson – keyboards (6, 9), strings (6, 9)
- Jeffrey "Zoux" Bluestein – additional keyboards (10)
- Paul Brown – guitars (1–4, 7), arrangements (1–4, 7, 8)
- Jay Gore – rhythm guitar (4)
- Michael Angel – guitars (6, 9)
- Roberto Vally – bass (1–4)
- Oskar Cataya – bass (5, 7)
- Frank Abraham – bass (6, 9)
- Alex Al – bass (10)
- Sergio Gonzalez – drums (1–4)
- David Hooper – drums (5, 7, 8)
- Iajhi Hampden – drums (6, 9, 10)
- Richie Gajate-Garcia – percussion (1–4, 6)
- Ronnie Gutierrez – percussion (5, 7, 8)
- Taku Hirano – percussion (10)
- Lee Thornburg – brass (4), additional horn arrangements (4)
- Janis Liebhart – backing vocals (8)

=== Production ===
- Paul Brown – producer (1–4, 7), recording (1–4, 6–10), mixing
- Michael Ripoll – producer (5, 10)
- Jessy J – producer (6, 8, 9)
- Bryant Sirono – recording (5, 9)
- David Darlington – mastering at Bass Hit Studios (New York City, New York)
- Lorien Babajian – package design
- Tom Keller – photography
- Stewart Coxhead with International Music Management – management
