= Just Between Us (Norman Brown album) =

Studio album by Norman Brown
- Released: September 8, 1992
- Recorded: 1992
- Studio: Lion Share Studios, Studio On Wheels, Studio 56 and Music Animals (Los Angeles, California); Ocean Way Recording and M'Bila Studios (Hollywood, California); Simpson Sonics (Van Nuys, California); Alpha Studios and Encore Studios (Burbank, California); Golden Scarab Studios (Studio City, California)
- Genre: Jazz; smooth jazz
- Length: 59:31
- Label: Motown
- Producer: Norman Brown; Norman Connors; Steve McKeever

Norman Brown chronology
Just Between Us (1992)	After the Storm (1994)

Just Between Us is the debut album by jazz guitarist Norman Brown. It was released in 1992 by Motown Records. The album reached No. 4 on the Billboard Top Contemporary Jazz Albums chart.

== Background ==
Brown produced the album with guest appearances by Stevie Wonder, Kirk Whalum, Ronnie Laws, the Earth, Wind & Fire Horns and Boyz II Men. The album contains cover versions of two songs: "Love Holiday" by Earth, Wind & Fire and "Too High" by Stevie Wonder. The latter song was featured in the end credits of the film Passenger 57.

== Critical reception ==
Professional ratings
Review scores
Source	Rating
AllMusic	4/5 stars

Sherri Winston of the Sun Sentinel called Just Between Us "jazzy fun that gets moody and sexy and thoughtful, but never boring... A beautiful ride."

Thom Jurek of AllMusic, in a 4 out of 5 stars review, commented, "The end result is an album that, although surely a product of its time in terms of production, is musically timeless. Its sense of balance between composition, arrangement, improvisation, and its various genre blends is still a blueprint for contemporary jazz in the 21st century."

== Track listing ==
No.	Title	Writer(s)	Length
1.	"Stormin'"	Norman Brown	6:09
2.	"Just Between Us"	Norman Brown	5:08
3.	"East Meets West"	Norman Brown	5:24
4.	"Love's Holiday"	Skip Scarborough, Maurice White	5:47
5.	"It's a Feelin'"	Norman Brown	4:00
6.	"Too High"	Stevie Wonder	5:11
7.	"Something Just for You"	Norman Brown	5:26
8.	"Here to Stay"	Norman Brown	6:31
9.	"Moonlight Tonight"	Norman Brown, Angel Rodgers	5:36
10.	"Sweet Taste"	Norman Brown	4:26
11.	"Inside"	Norman Brown	6:03

== Personnel ==
=== Musicians and vocalists ===
- Norman Brown – guitars, music concept (4)
- Herman Jackson – keyboards (1, 3, 5, 7, 11), synthesizers (9), synth strings (10)
- Wayne Linsey – keyboards (1, 3, 5, 11)
- Jerry Peters – keyboards (2)
- Brian Simpson – keyboards (2, 8), programming (2, 8)
- Bobby Lyle – acoustic piano (4, 7, 9), acoustic piano solo (8)
- Larry Farrow – keyboards (10), synth bass (10)
- Juewett Bostick – programming (10)
- Al McKay – rhythm guitar (4)
- Richard Patterson – bass (1, 3, 5, 6, 10, 11)
- Sam Sims – bass (2, 8)
- Verdine White – bass (4)
- Nathan East – bass (7, 9)
- Chuck Morris – drums (1, 3, 5, 6, 11)
- Land Richards – cymbals (2, 8, 10), drum fills (10)
- Michael Baker – drums (4, 7, 9)
- Paulinho da Costa – percussion (1, 3, 4, 6, 9)
- Munyungo Jackson – percussion (2, 7, 11)
- Ronnie Laws – soprano saxophone (1)
- Kirk Whalum – tenor saxophone (1)
- Gerald Albright – tenor saxophone (1, 5)
- Gary Bias – saxophones (4, 7, 9), flute (4, 7, 9)
- Jeff Clayton – saxophones (4, 7, 9), flute (4, 7, 9)
- Reggie Young – trombone (4, 7, 9)
- Ray Brown – trumpet (4, 7, 9)
- Stevie Wonder – harmonica (6), lead vocals (6)
- Perri – backing vocals (4, 9)
- Boyz II Men – backing vocals (6)
- Della Miles – backing vocals (10)
- Tony Warren – backing vocals (10)

=== Music arrangements ===
- Norman Brown – arrangements (1–3, 5–11), BGV arrangements (9)
- Norman Connors – arrangements (1–3, 5, 7–11)
- Land Richards – arrangements (3, 8)
- Benjamin Wright – arrangements (4, 7, 9), horn arrangements (7, 9), string arrangements (9)
- Denise Stewart – BGV arrangements (4, 9)
- Stevie Wonder – arrangements (6)
- Juewett Bostick – arrangements (10)

=== Production ===
- Steve McKeever – executive producer, producer (6)
- Norman Connors – producer (1–5, 7–11)
- Norman Brown – co-producer (1–3, 5, 8, 10, 11)
- Bruce Walker – A&R project coordinator
- Stephen Meltzer – art direction
- Shauna Woods – design
- Todd Gray – photography

=== Technical credits ===
- Ralph Sutton – recording, mixing (3, 7, 9, 10)
- Brant Biles – mixing (1, 2, 6)
- Malcolm Cecil – mixing (1, 2, 6)
- Robert Margouleff – mixing (1, 2, 6)
- John Falzarano – recording (2, 8)
- Brian Simpson – recording (2, 8)
- Barney Perkins – mixing (4)
- Elliott Peters – mixing (5, 8, 11)
- Steve McKeever – mixing (6)
- Richard Huredia – assistant engineer (1–9, 11)
- William Cooper – mix assistant (1, 2)
- Bob Tucker – mix assistant (3, 7, 9, 10)
- Noel Hazen – assistant engineer (4, 7, 9)
- Kenny Ochoa – mix assistant (4, 5)
- David Betancourt – mix assistant (8)
- Tina Antoine – mix assistant (11)
