= Jesse J =

Jesse J may refer to:

- Jesse James (1847–1882), American outlaw and legendary figure of the Wild West
- Jessy J (born 1982), American jazz musician
- Jessie J (born 1988), English singer-songwriter
