= Hot sauce (disambiguation) =

Hot sauce is a spicy sauce.

Hot sauce may also refer to:

== Music ==
- Hot Sauce (Jessy J album), released in 2011
- Hot Sauce (NCT Dream album), released in 2021
  - "Hot Sauce" (song), the title song
- "Hot Sauce", a song by Thomas Dolby from his album Aliens Ate My Buick (1988)
- "Hot Sauce", a song by Torren Foot (2018)
- "Hot Sauce", a song by Babymonster (2025)
- "Hot Sauce", a song by Madonna from her album Confessions II (2026)

== People with the nickname ==
- Philip Champion (born 1976), American streetball player
- Kevin Saucier (born 1956), American baseball pitcher
- Trevor Smith (fighter) (born 1981), American mixed martial artist

== Other uses ==
- HotSauce in computer software

== See also ==
- Hotsaucing, punishment by hot sauce
- Chili sauce, a condiment prepared with chili peppers or red tomato as a primary ingredient
