= Maya Azucena =

American singer-songwriter

- Genres: R&B, soul, acoustic
- Occupation: Singer-songwriter
- Years active: 2001–present
- Website: mayaazucena.com

Maya Azucena is an American singer-songwriter, recording artist and humanitarian from Brooklyn, New York City. She is a cultural ambassador, focusing on women's and youth empowerment as well as domestic and sexual violence.

Azucena has completed around twelve humanitarian tours sponsored by American Embassies and the U.S. State Department to countries such as China, Tanzania, Suriname, India, Sri Lanka, Haiti and Turkey. She has performed as a solo artist with her band in over forty countries.

== Musical career ==
=== Solo work ===
Azucena released her debut album "Maya Who?!" independently in 2003 and toured in America and Europe. CD Baby wrote the album, "Deep and soul-bearing" where she had sung like she had been everywhere and seen it all. This soul/R&B/hip hop album was a launching point for a young woman with a bright and long career ahead of her." The album featured guest artist Neal Evans of Soulive. Maya Who?! reached number 15 on CMJ's 2003 New Music Report.

Azucena's second major album Junkyard Jewel was released on Purpose Music Group Records in 2007. All tracks were acoustic, with several featuring string instruments. The song "Set You Free" was used in a Ford Motors Podcast. The song "Down, Down" was used in an episode of HBO's The Wire. The album was nominated for the Best Female Vocalist of the Year and Album of the Year at the SoulTracks Reader's Choice Awards.

In 2008, Taste This, a mix CD made by AMORE was released into circulation. The CD featured Rich Medina, Stephen Marley, Buckshot, among others.

In 2009, Azucena released a music video for her song "Get It Together", directed by Seth Kushner. The song was inspired by the work of Martin Luther King Jr.

On February 17, 2026, Azucena was announced as one of one of the semifinalists for the San Marino Song Contest 2026, San Marino's national selection for the Eurovision Song Contest 2026.

=== Collaborations ===
Azucena sang a duet with Stephen Marley on his 2007 record Mind Control. The album won a Grammy Award for Best Reggae Album in 2008.

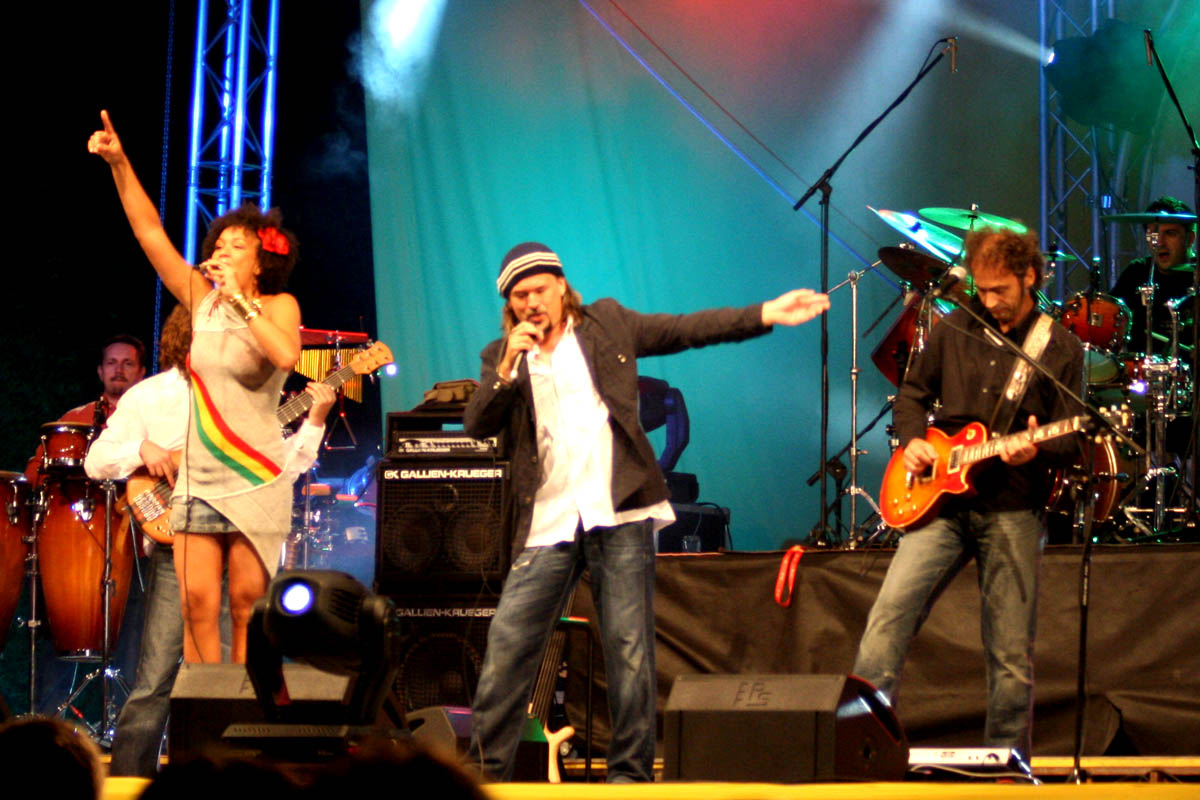
Maya performing live with Gibonni, September 2007

Azucena developed a musical relationship with Croatian singer Gibonni. She sang on his 2006 album Unca Fibre, which garnered two Croatian Grammy Awards (aka 'Porin'). Aside from appearing on two of his records, including aforementioned album and Acoustic/Electric, Azucena has joined him in extensive touring and television appearances throughout Europe. She has also collaborated with the album On je moj Bog, by Croatian musical group "Emanuel" and on album Veliki umovi 21. stoljeca, by band "Bolesna braca". Azucena also participated in a live concert of Oliver Dragojevic in Pula Arena 2007.

Azucena sang with Peruvian American rapper Immortal Technique on the track Crimes of the Heart from the 2008 album The 3rd World.

In response to the 2010 Haiti earthquake, Azucena sang with emcee Cormega on his tribute song I Made A Difference. The song also featured Redman, The Revelations, and various other artists.

Azucena sings on the new Fitz and the Tantrums album Pickin' Up the Pieces. Azucena's vocals are featured on the tracks Breakin' The Chains of Love and Winds of Change. The album has received acclamation and reached No. 2 on the Billboard Heatseekers Chart.

Azucena sang on the 2002 Norman Brown album Just Chillin'. The album won the 2003 Grammy Award for Best Pop Instrumental Album.

Azucena also collaborated with Jonathan Peters with the song Music.

=== Acknowledgements ===
Azucena's song Make It Happen made it to No. 3 on the Billboard Dance chart.

Azucena was named "Best Alternative Artist" by AllHipHop.com

She won three awards including "Best Female Vocal" in the international competition for ABC Radio Network Fame Games Effigy Awards.

She was nominated for "Best Female Vocalist of the Year" and "Album of the Year" at the Reader's Choice Soul Tracks Awards.

The Network Journal's 13th Annual List of outstanding business, leadership, and community service recognized Maya in the "Top 40 Under Forty Achievement" award.

== Activism and human rights ==
In 2006, Azucena sang at the "Save Darfur: Rally to Stop Genocide" on the National Mall in Washington, D.C. in solidarity with Barack Obama, Paul Rusesabagina, George Clooney, Elie Wiesel and, numerous other performers, activists, and celebrities.

Azucena performed as a part of Marcus Miller's concert for Japanese tsunami relief. She sang alongside bassist Marcus Miller, keyboardist Robert Glasper, and rapper Q-Tip.

She wrote two songs for the IFC documentary Lockdown USA, which examines the 1972 Rockefeller Drug Laws. USA

She provided music for Emmy-Winning UN documentarian Lisa Russel's latest film Not Yet Rain, regarding the advancement of Women's health laws and reproductive rights in Ethiopia.

Azucena performed two years in a row at the Susan G Komen Race for the Cure in New York City's Central Park, fundraising for breast cancer research.

Azucena produced Hope Night, a concert event devoted to domestic abuse awareness. The event brought together several nonprofit organizations and speakers, including Governor David Paterson.

In 2008 Azucena and her band did a five-week US State Department-sponsored tour of Burma, China, Philippines and Sri Lanka as a part of The Rhythm Road/American Music Abroad Program, performing concerts and workshops while appearing in national press in an effort to create cultural exchange. In 2009, Azucena toured for cultural exchange in Honduras and El Salvador and will be returning to Honduras for another program.

In response to tours of this nature Maya was invited to the White House to celebrate the Global Cultural Initiative.

== Discography ==
=== Albums ===
- Maya Who?! (2003)
- What You Don't Already Have (2005)
- The Rooftop: A Live Shot (2006)
- Make It Happen (Gotta Get Up) (2007)
- Junkyard Jewel (2007)
- Taste This (2008)
- Cry Love (2011)
