= Hot Sauce (Jessy J album) =

Studio album by Jessy J
- Released: September 6, 2011
- Studio: Funky Joint Studios (Sherman Oaks, California); Castle Oaks Productions (Calabasas, California); The Village Studios (Los Angeles, California); Mercy Sound Studios and Quad Recording Studios (New York City, New York).
- Genre: Contemporary jazz
- Length: 43:13
- Label: Heads Up
- Producer: Jessy J; Paul Brown; Joe Sample; Jon Notar; Saunders Sermons

Jessy J chronology
True Love (2009)	Hot Sauce (2011)	Second Chances (2013)

Hot Sauce is the third album by smooth jazz saxophonist Jessy J, released on September 6, 2011. It debuted at No. 1 on the Billboard Jazz chart. The album features guest performances by Saunders Sermons, Paul Brown, Joe Sample, Harvey Mason, and Ray Parker Jr.

== Track listing ==
1. "Remember the Night" (Jessy J, Marco Basci, Paul Brown) – 4:09
2. "Rio Grande" (Jessy J, Paul Brown) – 4:01
3. "Hot Sauce" (Jessy J, Paul Brown, DeYon Dobson, Michael Ripoll, Lawrence Young) – 3:17
4. "Rainbow Gold" (Jessy J, Joe Sample) – 4:27
5. "'Til You Make Up Your Mind" (Jessy J, Paul Brown) – 3:53
6. "Meant to Be" (Jessy J, Paul Brown, Thomas Klemperer) – 4:07
7. "We Kissed" (Jessy J, Paul Brown, Thomas Klemperer) – 2:50
8. "Leave Right Now" (Francis "Eg" White) – 3:34
9. "In a Sentimental Mood" (Duke Ellington, Manny Curtis, Irving Mills) – 4:47
10. "Last Night" (Jessy J, Janis Liebhart, Joe Sample) – 8:08

== Personnel ==
Musicians

- Jessy J – tenor saxophone (1–7, 9, 10), arrangements (1, 2, 4, 5, 6, 10), vocals (4, 7, 10), flute (6, 8), soprano saxophone (8)
- Paul Brown – keyboards (1), strings (1), guitars (1, 2, 5, 6, 7), bass (1), drum programming (1, 5, 6), arrangements (1, 2, 5, 6, 7), drums (2, 7), nylon guitar (3), percussion (5, 6, 7)
- Marco Basci – keyboards (2, 5), strings (2)
- DeYon Dobson – keyboards (3), drum programming (3)
- Lawrence Young – keyboards (3)
- Joe Sample – acoustic piano (4, 10), Rhodes piano (4), Rhodes solo (4), Hammond B3 organ (10), Korg Triton (10)
- Gregg Karukus – keyboards (6, 7), strings (6, 7)
- Jeff Carruthers – keyboards (8), guitars (8), bass (8), drum programming (8), arrangements (8)
- Jon Notar – acoustic piano (9), arrangements (9)
- Michael Ripoll – guitars (3), bass (3)
- Ray Parker Jr. – guitars (4, 10), arrangements (4, 10)
- Roberto Vally – bass (2, 5, 6, 7)
- Nicklas Sample – bass (4, 10)
- Jordan Scannella – electric bass (9)
- Harvey Mason – drums (4, 10)
- Josh Guinta – drums (9)
- Saunders Sermons – vocals (9), arrangements (9)
- Janis Liebhart – backing vocals (10)
- Toni Scruggs – backing vocals (10)

Production

- Paul Brown – producer (1, 2, 3, 5–8), recording (1, 2, 3, 5–8), mixing
- Jessy J – producer (4, 10)
- Joe Sample – producer (4, 10)
- Jon Notar – producer (9)
- Saunders Sermons – producer (9)
- Joshua Blanchard – recording (4, 10)
- Rob Filmore – recording (9)
- Nick Tashjian – assistant engineer
- Paul Blakemore – mastering at CMG Mastering (Cleveland, Ohio)
- Janet Wolsburn – package design
- Nicolas Zurcher – photography
- Karyn Hughes – photography assistant
- Stewart Coxhead with International Music – management

== Charts ==
Chart performance for Hot Sauce
Chart (2011)	Peak position
US Jazz Albums (Billboard)	1
