= Two Siberians =

Russian music duo

Two Siberians a.k.a. White Fort
- Origin: Moscow, Russia
- Genres: Jazz fusion, world fusion, instrumental rock, avant-rock
- Years active: 1995–2008, 2012
- Labels: Cool Hat, Heads Up
- Members: Artyom Yakushenko; Yuriy Matveyev

Two Siberians is a Russian music duo composed of Artyom Yakushenko (electric violin) and Yuriy Matveyev (electric guitar). In Russia, their music has been produced under the name White Fort (Russian: Белый Острог, Belyi Ostrog).

Matveyev and Yakushenko are, as their Western nom de plume suggests, residents of Siberia. They met in 1986 while studying at the Irkutsk Art Academy. At their debut concert in Novosibirsk, they won the festival's award for Best Original Artists, an honor which nearly got them expelled from school (for sullying their stern classical training by performing jazz and rock music).

As White Fort, the duo released nine studio albums in their native country between 1995 and 2006, including the score for a ballet, and soundtracks for Russian television and film. They toured extensively in Russia and were featured at many major festivals.

In 1997, playing for vodka shots at the opening of an exclusive photography exhibit in Moscow, White Fort captured the attention of an American music producer, who casually suggested he'd like to see them make a recording back in the United States. The noncommittal nature of this chitchat was apparently lost in translation, as the next time this producer saw the duo, they had just arrived at JFK Airport, "ready to pursue their version of the American dream."

Despite enthusiastic public reaction to their performances, it proved impossible to sign them with a major recording label. Studio executives refused to believe that two ragamuffins from "out of nowhere" could possibly sell 125 demo CDs in a single performance at New York City's Times Square.

After a series of adventures involving a whirlwind national club tour, expiring green cards, lonely musicians missing their wives and children back in the Old Country, and meteorites, Two Siberians financed and produced their first Western LP, Out of Nowhere. A number of well-known jazz musicians contributed to individual songs on the album, including Michael Brecker (tenor sax), Don Byron (clarinet), and Richard Bona (bass).

The duo split up in 2009 and pursued various solo projects for several years. In April 2012, they reunited on stage in Moscow. Within days of that concert, their song "6/8" was awarded First Place in the "Instrumental" category of the 2011 International Songwriting Competition.

Spurred by the prize and the warm reception at their reunion performance, White Fort began performing on stage together again in May and June 2012. They returned to the United States the following autumn and toured the west coast.

It is virtually impossible to find any of their original recordings outside of Russia, other than the Out of Nowhere LP. However, White Fort re-released Anglicized versions of their albums Two Kings and 6/8 in the US market. While in Seattle, Washington, the duo performed a recording session at Electrokitty, though a new release has not yet been announced.

== Discography ==
- 1995: Peculiar Reality (White Fort), En Face Records, Novouralsk, Russia.
- 1996: Ancient Cave (Белый Острог), En Face Records, Novouralsk, Russia.
- 1997: Forgotten Name (Белый Острог), En Face Records, Novouralsk, Russia.
- 2000: Out of the Woods (Two Siberians), Demo CD, Soundbyte Studios, USA.
- 2001: My Love, the Color Green (Белый Острог), ballet score.
- 2002: Two Siberians (Белый Острог).
- 2002: Next 2 (Белый Острог), TV series soundtrack.
- 2003: Next 3 (Белый Острог), TV series soundtrack.
- 2004: Two Kings (Белый Острог).
- 2005: Out of Nowhere (Two Siberians), Heads Up International, Cleveland, Ohio, USA.
- 2005: 6/8 (Белый Острог).
- 2006: Duke of Montenegro (Белый Острог), Film soundtrack.
- 2011: Two Kings (White Fort), Cool Hat Records, Salem, Oregon.
- 2012: 6/8 (White Fort), Cool Hat Records, Salem, Oregon.

== Other external links ==
- allaboutjazz.com - reviews of Out of Nowhere
- progarchives.com - general bio, reviews, and discography
- whitefort.ru - Russian official website (outdated)
- sonicbids.com - official online press kit
