= Celebration (Norman Brown album) =

Studio album by Norman Brown
- Released: August 10, 1999
- Studio: Funky Joint Studios and Titan Recording Studios (Sherman Oaks, California); Bill Schnee Studios and Track Recording, Inc. (North Hollywood, California); Yellow House Studios (Hollywood, California); Adwin Recording Studios (Van Nuys, California); Alpha Recording Studios (Burbank, California); Front Page Studios (Glendale, California)
- Genre: Jazz
- Length: 52:58
- Label: Warner Bros.
- Producer: Norman Brown; Paul Brown; Oji Pierce

Norman Brown chronology
Better Days Ahead (1996)	Celebration (1999)	Just Chillin' (2004)

Professional ratings
Review scores
Source	Rating
AllMusic	3/5 stars
Jazz Times	(favourable)

Celebration is the fourth studio album by jazz guitarist Norman Brown, released in 1999 on Warner Bros. Records. The album reached No. 2 on the Billboard Contemporary Jazz Albums chart and No. 4 on the Billboard Top Jazz Albums chart.

== Overview ==
Brown covered the Stylistics' "You Make Me Feel Brand New" on the album.

A song from the LP called "Rain" reached No. 15 on the Billboard Adult R&B Songs chart.

== Track listing ==
No.	Title	Writer(s)	Length
1.	"Out'a Nowhere"	Norman Brown, Paul Brown, Brian Culbertson, Todd Sucherman	4:52
2.	"Together at Last"	Norman Brown, Paul Brown	5:05
3.	"Paradise"	Norman Brown	4:26
4.	"You Make Me Feel Brand New"	Thom Bell, Linda Creed	5:45
5.	"Celebration"	Norman Brown	4:23
6.	"Getting By"	Norman Brown	4:54
7.	"Rain"	Brian Alexander Morgan, Jaco Pastorius	4:14
8.	"Never Again"	Norman Brown, Paul Brown, Lynne Fiddmont-Linsey, Kimberly Ross	4:39
9.	"Breaking Out"	Norman Brown	5:21
10.	"It's Time for Love"	Norman Brown	4:37
11.	"Stay Strong"	Norman Brown	4:42

== Credits ==
=== Musicians and vocalists ===
- Norman Brown – all guitars, vocals (1, 8, 9), lead vocals (4)
- Tim Heintz – keyboards (1), additional keyboards (2, 3, 7)
- Dave Torkanosky – keyboards (2, 3)
- Oji Pierce – keyboards (4), programming (4)
- Herman Jackson – keyboards (5, 6, 9–11), synthesizers (5, 9–11), synthesizer programming (6), acoustic piano (10)
- David "Kahlid" Woods – keyboards (7, 8), drums (7, 8)
- Alex Al – bass (2, 3)
- Larry Kimpel – bass (5, 6, 9–11)
- Lil' John Roberts – drums (2, 3, 5, 6)
- Rayford Griffin – drums (9, 11)
- Lenny Castro – percussion (2, 3)
- Munyungo Jackson – percussion (6, 10, 11)
- Dan Higgins – saxophones (3)
- Bill Reichenbach Jr. – trombone (3)
- Rick Braun – trumpet (3)
- Phajja (Kena Epps, Nakia Epps & Karen Johnson) – lead vocals (4)
- Bridgette Bryant-Fiddmont – backing vocals (6)
- Lynne Fiddmont-Linsey – backing vocals (6), vocals (10)
- Tim Owens – backing vocals (6)
- Sue Ann Carwell – backing vocals (8)
- Miki Butler – vocals (10)
- LaNika Hayes – vocals (10)

=== Music arrangements ===
- Paul Brown – arrangements (1–3, 8)
- Jerry Hey – horn arrangements (2, 3)
- Oji Pierce – arrangements (4)
- Jeremy Monroe – BGV arrangements (4)
- Norman Brown – arrangements (5, 6, 9–11), vocal arrangements (6, 10)
- Lynne Fiddmont-Linsey – vocal arrangements (6, 10)
- David "Kahlid" Woods – arrangements (7, 8)

=== Production ===
- Matt Pierson – executive producer
- Paul Brown – producer (1–3, 7, 8)
- Oji Pierce – producer (4)
- Norman Brown – producer (5, 6, 9–11)
- Herman Jackson – co-producer (5, 6, 9–11)
- Michael Vail Blum – co-producer (5, 6, 9–11)
- Lexy Shroyer – production coordinator (1–3, 7, 8)
- Kimberly Ross – production coordinator (5, 6, 9–11)
- Gregory Gilmer – art direction, design
- Kate Garner – photography
- Bruce Kramer – management

=== Technical credits ===
- Don C. Tyler – mastering at Precision Mastering (Hollywood, California)
- Paul Brown – mixing (1–3, 7, 8), recording (1, 7, 8)
- Bill Schnee – recording (2, 3)
- Oji Pierce – recording (4), mixing (4)
- Michael Vail Blum – recording (5, 6, 9–11)
- Erik Zobler – recording (5, 6, 9–11), mixing (5, 6, 9, 10)
- Koji Egawa – mix assistant (2)
- Guy DeFazio – second mix engineer (4)
- Al Fujisaki – assistant engineer (4)
- Gary C. Kroeger – assistant engineer (5, 6, 9, 10)
- Dan Steinberg – assistant engineer (5, 6, 9, 10)
- Martin Kloiber – assistant engineer (6)
- Bob Tucker – assistant engineer (10)
- Sergio Garcia – assistant engineer (11)
