= David W. Tucker =

American trombonist and bandleader (1929-2003)

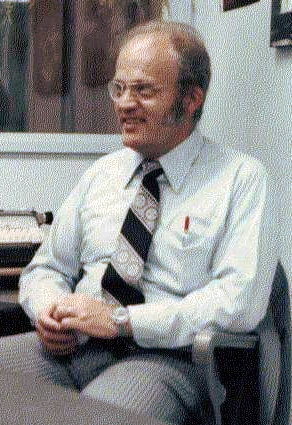
- David W. “Doc” Tucker; Director UC Jazz Ensembles,1969-1985

Background information
- Origin: Cerro Gordo, Illinois
- Genres: Jazz, classical, marching band
- Years active: 1947– 1985

David W. Tucker (1929–2003) was an American jazz trombonist, music educator, composer of band and orchestral music, record producer, and marching band arranger, most renowned as the director of the University of California Jazz Ensembles from 1969 until 1985. Under his direction, the organization expanded to become the largest musical organization on the campus of the University of California, Berkeley, had an international reputation resulting from foreign tours, and sponsored the Pacific Coast Collegiate Jazz Festival. Numerous student members of the organization have become renowned jazz musicians, composers, and music educators.

== History ==
=== Early years ===
David W. (Doc) Tucker was raised as an only child in a small central Illinois town, Cerro Gordo, where he attended the public schools. He obtained an undergraduate and master's degree in music education from the University of Illinois in 1950 and 1951, respectively, before entering the military.

=== At the University of California, Berkeley ===
In 1965, he both began teaching music at Luther Burbank High School in Sacramento and began studies toward a doctorate in Music Education at University of California, Berkeley. In 1966, at the request of the Sacramento school district, Tucker assumed the position of Director of Bands at Sacramento City College. While in Sacramento, Tucker played trombone in the show bands of Lake Tahoe. He also arranged compositions for the show bands. He completed his Ed.D. at Berkeley in 1969.

In the fall of 1968, Tucker was hired as an arranger and composer for the Cal Marching Band. He was appointed Associate Director in 1969. His responsibilities with the Cal Band included rehearsing, auditioning prospective new members, and directing on the football field opposite director James Berdahl. For the 1971 season, during Berdahl’s sabbatical year in Japan, Tucker was named Acting Director.

At the end of the 1971 season, Tucker left the Cal Band to accept the newly created position of Director of UC Jazz under Cal’s musical activities department.

== Professional career ==
=== Jazz trombonist ===
Tucker performed in the Champaign-Urbana area as a trombone player until his induction into the army. He was a trombone soloist with the Army band while stationed in Little Rock, Arkansas, during the Korean War.

After the war, he moved to California, where he played trombone in the house bands at numerous Sacramento and Lake Tahoe venues.

=== Music educator ===
Tucker mentored numerous students as a classical composer and music teacher. He mentored numerous students at Fiatarones Music Store in Pinole, California, in music, music education, and composition. Among professional composers who studied with Tucker are Rolf Johnson, Michael Wolff, and Susan Muscarella of the JazzSchool in Berkeley.

=== Director of the University of California Jazz Ensembles ===
Within a couple years of Tucker's assuming the position of director, increasing interest of more student musicians to join the big band led to the creation of, two additional big bands, the Tuesday Night Band and the Thursday Night Band, with the original big band, composed of the most skilled of the jazz musicians, named the Wednesday Night Band.

Tucker directed the University of California Jazz Ensembles until 1985, his early retirement resulting largely from a bad back that had him lying flat for a year. Each year 100 students worked under his direction in the Monday, Tuesday, and Wednesday night big bands, combos, and classes.

Under Tucker's guidance, the University of California Jazz Ensembles became the most successful and visible performing arts organization on the Cal campus. The bands of the University of California Jazz Ensembles performed throughout California, at cultural venues such as the Oakland Art Museum and International House, once or twice weekly on campus, and at student and administration functions, including receptions for the Chancellor of the Berkeley campus.

The first tier band, the Wednesday Night Band, was sponsored by the government of Poland to travel to Poland to perform at Katowice University in 1979 and the Montreux Jazz Festival arranged for the group to perform as the featured collegiate band during the trip and paid for its travel to Switzerland. The total trip lasted four weeks, with other sponsored-appearances in the four Scandinavian countries. Tucker had formed a friendship with Japanese dignitaries during their educational trip to Berkeley, and the prefectures of Okayama and Hyogo jointly sponsored the group on a Japanese tour during 1981. The group received critical acclaim and a last-minute concert was arranged by the sponsors at the Japanese major league baseball Korakuen Stadium.

== Recognition ==
In the service with the army he was principal trombone with the Fort Smith Symphony and directed the 5th Armored Division public relations tours and radio broadcasts. In Sacramento, he taught at the elementary, high school, where he was music department chairman, and college levels. He was director of bands at Sacramento City College and taught at Sacramento State College. At the same time, he was the curriculum supervisor for the Sutter Union School District. He adjudicated and was featured conductor at various jazz festivals throughout the state of California.

He received numerous honors as an educator and conductor and held numerous leadership positions in music and educator associations.

Tucker also received awards for his marching band arrangements and a Cal Berkeley award as an educator.

=== Record producer ===
Beginning in 1974, Tucker produced recordings of UC Jazz under various labels. The 1979 European Tour band recorded UC Berkeley Jazz Ensemble Vol. 1, 1979 at the College for Recording Arts in San Francisco, and the 1981 Japan Tour band recorded Orange Blossom Special at Polydor Studios in Tokyo, Japan.

== Influence ==
Many student musicians who studied privately with Tucker or who performed with UC Jazz became musicians, band leaders, and music educators in their own right as a result of their experience with Tucker. These include pianist, band leader, and composer Michael Wolff, steel drum player Andy Narell, and bass guitarist Dave Meros (who played bass trombone in the jazz ensemble). Others, provided the opportunity to be soloists and announcers for the organization, embarked on careers as musician agents, music producers, radio disk jockeys, and stand-up comedians. UC Jazz continues as a viable organization on the Cal Berkeley campus, celebrating its 44th anniversary in 2011.
