= Tequila Moon =

Studio album by Jessy J
- Released: 4 March 2008
- Studio: Funky Joint Studios (Sherman Oaks, California); Castle Oaks Productions (Calabasas, California); Entourage Studios (North Hollywood, California); Stagg Street Studio (Van Nuys, California).
- Genre: Contemporary jazz
- Label: Peak Records
- Producer: Paul Brown

Jessy J chronology
Tequila Moon (2008)	True Love (2009)

Tequila Moon is the first studio album from Peak Records recording artist Jessy J. It includes the Billboard Jazz #1 song "Tequila Moon". The album was released on March 4, 2008 and produced by Paul Brown.

== Track listing ==
1. "Tequila Moon" (Paul Brown, Tommy K, Jessy J) - 4:36
2. "Spanish Nights" (Donald Hayes) - 3:45
3. "Sin Ti/Without You" (Jessy J, Paul Brown) - 4:35
4. "Mas que Nada" (Jorge Ben) - 5:04
5. "Fiesta velada" (Jessy J, Paul Brown) - 4:07
6. "Poetry Man" (Phoebe Snow) - 3:36
7. "Turquoise Street" (Kiki Ebsen) - 4:03
8. "PB 'n' J" (Paul Brown, Jessy J) - 3:04
9. "Bésame Mucho" (Consuelo Velazquez) - 3:40
10. "Running Away" (Jessy J, Paul Brown) - 3:51
11. "A Song for You" (Leon Russell) - 5:43
