= West Coast Coolin' =

Studio album by Norman Brown
- Released: September 21, 2004
- Studio: Sunset Sound Recorders and Conway Studios (Hollywood, California); Entourage Studios and The Villa (North Hollywood, California); Studio Atlantis (Los Angeles, California); Funky Joint Studios and Titan Studios (Sherman Oaks, California); Golden Bolden Music (Burbank, California); JCM Studios (Woodland Hills, California); Axis Studios and The Studio (Philadelphia, Pennsylvania)
- Genre: Jazz; smooth jazz
- Length: 44:11
- Label: Warner Bros.
- Producer: James Poyser; Paul Brown; Norman Brown; Jay Dee; Malik Pendleton; Vikter Duplaix; Brian Culbertson; Herman Jackson

Norman Brown chronology
Just Chillin' (2002)	West Coast Coolin' (2004)	Stay with Me (2007)

West Coast Coolin' is a studio album by American jazz guitarist Norman Brown, released in 2004 by Warner Bros. Records. The album reached No. 3 on the Billboard Top Contemporary Jazz Albums, No. 5 on the Billboard Top Jazz Albums and No. 24 on the Billboard Top R&B/Hip-Hop albums charts.

== Critical reception ==
Professional ratings
Review scores
Source	Rating
AllMusic	3/5 stars

Woodrow Wilkins of All About Jazz wrote,

The guitarist/vocalist is a master of the laid-back groove, successfully bringing together elements of smooth jazz and contemporary R&B. On West Coast Coolin', Brown consolidates his reputation as a premier recording and performing artist with a collection of ten tracks—written and co-written by the leader—that push the idea of "chillin'" to new heights.

Thom Jurek of AllMusic commented,

Brown works with a host of producers, and his familiar smooth jazz underpinnings — derived more from George Benson and Hiram Bullock than Wes Montgomery these days — are present but not prevalent on most of the set. Instead, his slick nu-soul/nu-jazz singing style — identified by a thin whispery tenor — gets front and center on more than half the album's ten cuts.

== Track listing ==
No.	Title	Writer(s)	Length
1.	"I Might"	Chalmers Alford, Eric Benét, Vikter Duplaix, Pino Palladino, James Poyser	04:50
2.	"Up 'n' At 'Em"	Christopher Bolden, Norman Brown, Wirlie Morris	04:00
3.	"West Coast Coolin'"	Christopher Bolden, Norman Brown, Wirlie Morris	04:31
4.	"Missin' You"	Christopher Bolden, Norman Brown, Wirlie Morris	04:16
5.	"Come Over"	Eric Benét, Vikter Duplaix, James Poyser	04:27
6.	"What's Goin' On"	Renaldo Benson, Al Cleveland, Marvin Gaye	04:39
7.	"Let's Play"	Christopher Bolden, Norman Brown, Wirlie Morris	04:51
8.	"Right Now"	Norman Brown, Brian Culbertson, Stephen Lu	03:56
9.	"Angel"	Malik Pendleton, James Poyser, James Yancey	04:30
10.	"Remember the Time"	Norman Brown	04:11

== Personnel ==
Musicians and vocalists

- Norman Brown – vocals (1, 2, 4, 6–9), lead guitar (1), guitars (2–10)
- James Poyser – keyboards (1, 5, 9), drums (9)
- Vikter Duplaix – programming (1, 5)
- Wirlie Morris – keyboards (2–4, 7), programming (2, 3, 7)
- Chris Bolden – programming (2, 3, 7), drum programming (4)
- Dragan "DC" Capor – additional programming (2–4, 6, 7), digital processing (7)
- David "Kahlid" Woods – keyboards (6), drum programming (6), backing vocals (6)
- Brian Culbertson – keyboards (8), programming (8)
- Stephen Lu – keyboards (8), programming (8)
- Herman Jackson – keyboards (10)
- Chalmers Alford – rhythm guitar (1, 5), guitar (5)
- Pino Palladino – bass (1, 5)
- Alex Al – bass (2, 3, 6, 10)
- Thaddeus Tribbett – bass (9)
- Lil' John Roberts – drums (2, 3)
- Michael Bland – drums (10)
- Luis Conte – percussion (2, 3)
- Arno Lucas – percussion (6)
- Kevin Ricard – percussion (10)
- Dan Higgins – saxophones (2, 3), flute (3)
- Reggie Young – trombone (2, 3)
- Jerry Hey – flugelhorn (2–4)
- Lynne Fiddmont-Linsey – vocals (8)

Music arrangements

- Chris Bolden – arrangements (2–4, 7)
- Paul Brown – arrangements (2, 3, 6)
- Wirlie Morris – arrangements (2–4, 7)
- Jerry Hey – horn arrangements (2, 3)
- David "Kahlid" Woods – arrangements (6)
- Brian Culbertson – arrangements (8)
- Stephen Lu – arrangements (8)
- Norman Brown – arrangements (10)
- Herman Jackson – arrangements (10)

== Production ==
- Vikter Duplaix – producer (1, 5)
- James Poyser – producer (1, 5, 9)
- Paul Brown – producer (2–4, 6, 7)
- Brian Culbertson – producer (8)
- Jay Dee – producer (9)
- Malik Pendleton – producer (9)
- Norman Brown – producer (10)
- Herman Jackson – producer (10)
- Lexy Shroyer – production coordinator (2–4, 6)
- Ellen Wakayama – creative director
- Gregory Gilmer – art direction
- Lisa Peardon – photography
- Bruce Kramer for Kramer Management – management

Technical credits

- Kevin "K.D." Davis – recording (1, 5), mixing (1, 5)
- Ryan Moys – recording (1, 5, 9)
- Chris Bolden – recording (2–4)
- Paul Brown – recording (2–4, 6, 7), mixing (2–4, 7, 10)
- Wirlie Morris – recording (2–4)
- Erik Zobler – recording (2, 3)
- Timothy Day – recording (5, 9)
- Jan Fairchild – mixing (6)
- Brian Culbertson – recording (8)
- Peter Mokran – mixing (8)
- Russell Elevado – mixing (9)
- Michael Vail Blum – recording (10)
- Dragan "DC" Capor – digital editing (2–4, 6, 7), Pro Tools technician (2–4, 6)
- Brian Hearity – second engineer (2, 3, 6)
