= Jessy J =

American saxophonist

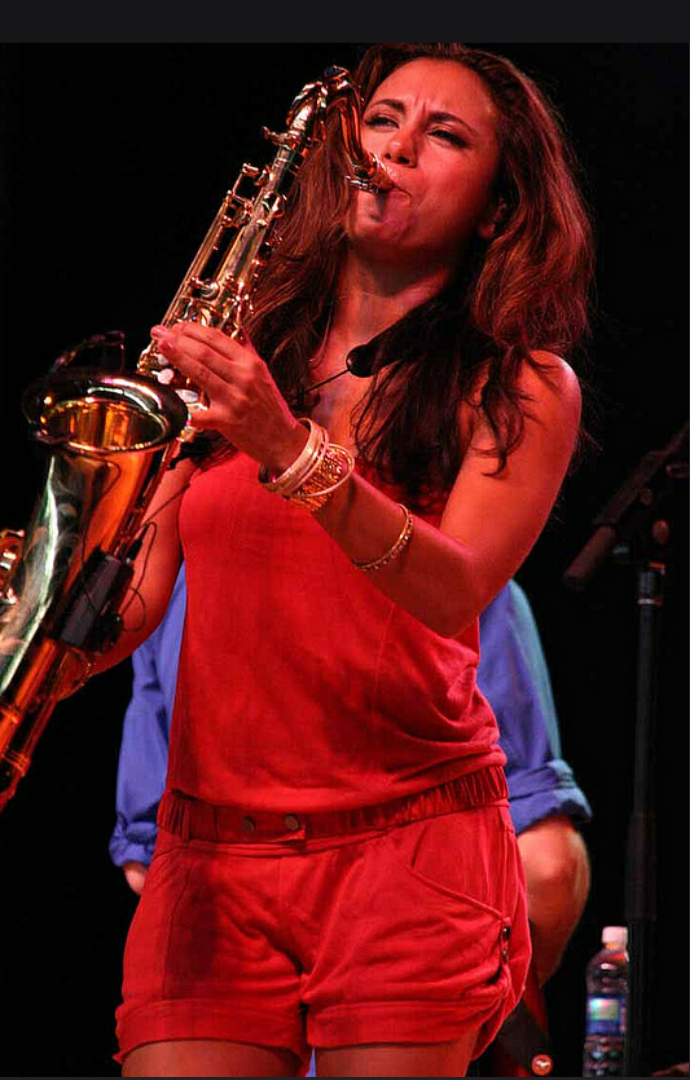
- Jessy J in 2009

Background information
- Born: Jessica Arellano; December 20, 1982 (age 43); Portland, Oregon
- Genres: Jazz
- Occupation: Musician
- Instrument: Saxophone
- Years active: 2001–present
- Labels: Peak, Heads Up, Concord, Shanachie
- Website: jessyj.com

Jessica Arellano (born December 20, 1982), known professionally as Jessy J, is an American saxophonist.

== Biography ==
Jessy J was born Jessica Arellano on December 20, 1982, in Portland, Oregon, and raised in Hemet, California. Of Mexican-American descent, her father is from Mexico and her mother is a native Texan. She began playing piano at the age of four. At the age of 15, at the Béla Bartók Festival, she won the Piano State Championship. She also played saxophone in state honored bands, such as the Grammy Band, and played internationally in festivals like the Montreux Jazz Festival in Switzerland. After earning a scholarship from the University of Southern California, she obtained a degree in jazz studies and was named the "Most Outstanding Jazz Student".

While attending USC, Jessy auditioned and was selected to join Disney as a member of the All American College Band two consecutive years in a row. As a band member she attended workshops learning critical skills, such as leadership, teamwork, and communication which gave her the confidence needed for creative song writing and organizing a band as a leader. In 2010 Jessy was inducted into Disney's Magic Music Days Hall of Fame.

After graduating from USC, she worked in the studio with Michael Bublé. She toured with The Temptations, Jessica Simpson, Michael Bolton, and Seal. Other Artists she has performed or recorded with include Taylor Swift, Chance the Rapper, Robin Thicke, Andra Day, Maxwell, Joe Sample, Harvey Mason, and Ray Parker, Jr.

Jessy J performed on the twice Grammy nominated album Elevation as a member of the Henry Mancini Jazz Orchestra. Jessy has performed on the hit television competition shows American Idol, The Voice and Dancing With the Stars. The year Steven Tyler was a judge on Idol, he was so impressed with her performances that he invited her to play on Aerosmith's 2012 album Music From Another Dimension.

Prior to being a studio musician and touring as a jazz artist, Jessy J performed in the casts of Mason Entertainment Group's Off-Broadway shows Shockwave, Cyberjam, and M.I.X. She performed not only as a saxophonist and singer but also as an actress and dancer. Touring with Mason Entertainment led her across the US, the United Kingdom, and Japan.

Jessy J's recording career began after producer/guitarist Paul Brown listened to her demo and gave her a spot on his tour. She soon began making solo appearances. Her first major solo performance was at the Catalina JazzTrax Festival in 2006. Soon afterward, she and Paul Brown were in the studio recording her first album, Tequila Moon.

Since beginning her career, she has toured with other jazz artists, such as Jeff Lorber, Jeff Golub, Euge Groove, Paul Brown, and Gerald Albright. In 2008/2009, she toured as a part of the Guitars & Saxes tour. In 2010 she Toured with Norman Brown and Brenda Russell in the Summer Storm Jazz tour.

Jessy was carefully selected along with a handful of young jazz artists by Selmer Saxophones to be part of a team of educators at schools to help advance music programs.

Jessy J has built up a Latin following, lending her hand in Hispanic music programs and performing with the Hispanic Musician Association Orchestra. In 2006 Jessy J was hand selected by Paquito D'Rivera to perform at Carnegie Hall as part of the Latin Jazz Project featuring the "Rising Stars of Tomorrow". She has also worked in Mexico with artists Gloria Trevi, Armando Manzanero, Grammy Nominated singer Cristian Castro, Rock of Ages star Diego Boneta, and Sheila E.

Her song "Tequila Moon" hit the #1 spot on the Billboard chart for Jazz. Her song "Tropical Rain", from her 2009 release, reached the top of the Groove Jazz Music chart and also took the #1 spot on the Smooth Jazz Top 20 Countdown, as well as the R&R and Billboard Jazz charts.

In 2008, Jessy J was named Radio & Records "Debut Artist of the Year". She also received the "Contemporary Jazz Song of the Year" award from R&R and Billboard for her song "Tequila Moon". Also that year, she was featured on the cover of the May issue of Jazziz Magazine. In 2009, she was on the October cover of Saxophone Journal and Latina Style Magazine.

In 2011, Jessy's album Hot Sauce debuted at number one on the Billboard Jazz Albums chart and was featured in People en Español and Latina magazine. The album includes performances by Jazz Legends Joe Sample, Harvey Mason, and Ray Parker Jr.

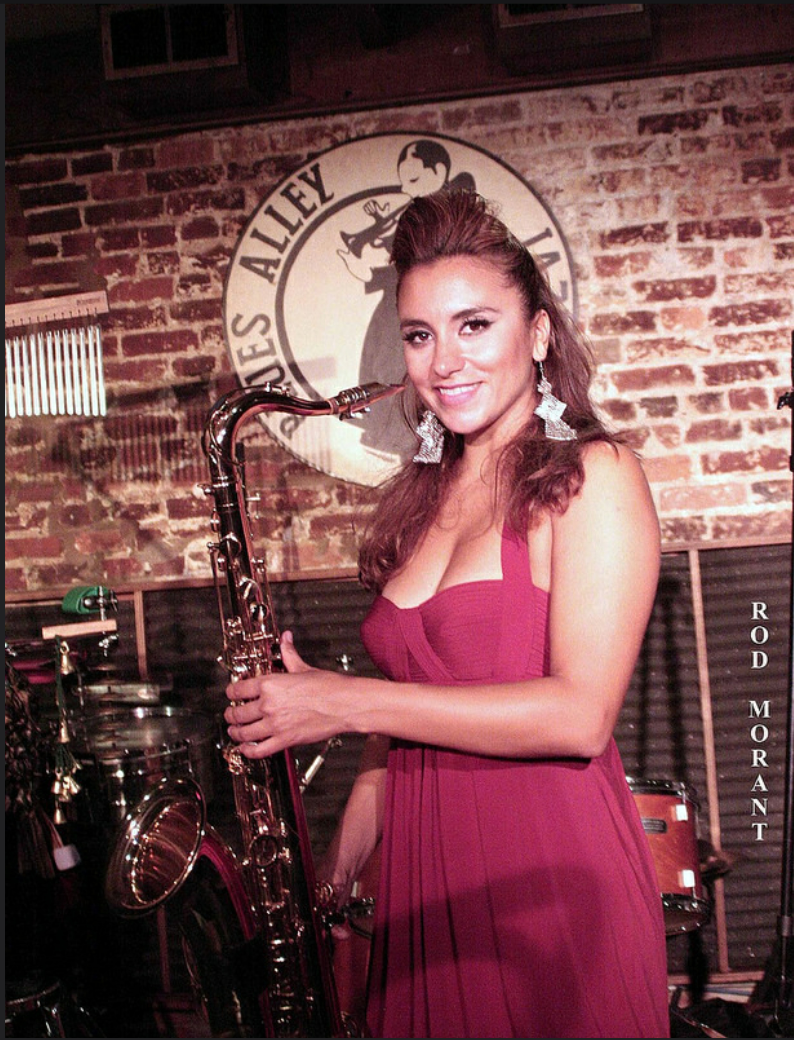
Jessy J performing in 2013

== Television performances ==
- 2012 American Idol Finale with Neil Diamond
- 2012 American Idol performances with Phillip Phillips and Jessica Sanchez
- 2012 The Voice "Just the Way You Are", "Dancing in the Street" with Cee Lo Green
- 2011 CNN Espanol
- 2011 Univision, Acceso Total, Miami
- 2011 Telemundo, Levántate
- 2011 Telemundo, Azul
- 2010 Fox Morning News
- 2009 Good Morning UK with Seal
- 2009 Royal Albert Hall PBS Special with Michael Bolton
- 2008 Este Noche Tu Night, America TeVe
- 2008 Telemundo, Nitido
- 2006 The View w/Jessica Simpson
- 2006 Good Morning America with Jessica Simpson
- 2006 NBC's Rockefeller Christmas Tree Ceremony w/Jessica Simpson
- 2004 BBC, Blue Peter

== Discography ==
=== Contemporary jazz albums ===
- Tequila Moon (Peak, 2008)
- True Love (Peak, 2009)
- Hot Sauce (Heads Up, 2011)
- Second Chances (Shanachie, 2013)
- My One and Only One (Shanachie, 2015)
- California Christmas (Changi Records, 2016)
- Live At Yoshi's: 10 Year Anniversary Special (Changi Records, 2018)
- Blue (Changi Records, 2022)
- California Christmas, Vol. 2 (Changi Records, 2022)
- Terranova (Changi Records, 2025)

=== Children's albums ===
- Children's Album – (instrumental lullabies) – [EP] (Changi Records, 2024)
- Now, Let's Play – (sing-along) – [Toddler Tunes album] (Changi Records, 2024)

=== Charted singles ===
Year	Title	Peak chart positions	Album	Ref.
Year	Title	Smooth Jazz Airplay	Album	Ref.
2008	"Tequila Moon"	1	Tequila Moon	
2009	"Tropical Rain"	1	True Love	
2010	"True Love"	14	True Love	
2011	"Hot Sauce"	4	Hot Sauce	
2012	"Rainbow Gold"	24	Hot Sauce	
2012	"Remember the Night"	16	Hot Sauce	
2013	"Listen 2 the Groove"	8	Second Chances	
2014	"Second Chances" (featuring Norman Brown)	19	Second Chances	
2015	"The Tango Boy"	7	My One and Only One	
2016	"My One and Only One"	—N/a	My One and Only One	—
2018	"All I Want"	3	Live at Yoshi's: 10-Year Anniversary Special	
2019	"Despacito" (live)	23	Live at Yoshi's: 10-Year Anniversary Special	
2022	"Dance Beat"	5	Blue	
2023	"Blue"	—N/a	Blue	—
2025	"Terranova"	—N/a	Terranova	—
"—" denotes a recording that did not chart.
