= Sakésho =

- Andy Narell, Mario Canonge, Jean-Philippe Fanfant, Michel Alibo

Background information
- Genres: Caribbean jazz, jazz fusion
- Labels: Heads Up
- Members: Michel Alibo, Mario Canonge, Jean-Philippe Fanfant, Andy Narell
- Website: www.myspace.com/sakesho

Sakésho is a jazz quartet based band in France.

Sakésho is based in the beguine, the polyrhythmic music of the French Caribbean. The band members are Mario Canonge (piano), Michel Alibo (bass) and Jean-Philippe Fanfant (drums); all born in the French Caribbean, plus North American Andy Narell (steelpan).

The group is based in Paris. They perform under the direction of Heads Up International They recorded just two albums in the past five years, and have worked with the likes of several famous jazz musicians on their album projects.

== Discography ==
- Sakesho (2002)
- We Want You to Say (2005)
