= True Love (Jessy J album) =

Studio album by Jessy J
- Released: August 4, 2009
- Studio: Funky Joint Studios (Sherman Oaks, California); Entourage Studios (North Hollywood, California); Porter Ranch Studio (Porter Ranch, California).
- Genre: Contemporary jazz
- Length: 39:18
- Label: Peak
- Producer: Paul Brown, Pablo Aguirre

Jessy J chronology
Tequila Moon (2008)	True Love (2009)	Hot Sauce (2011)

True Love is the second studio album by saxophonist Jessy J, released through Peak Records on August 4, 2009. It includes the Groove Jazz Music number-one single "Tropical Rain". That song also reached number one on the R&R and Billboard Jazz charts. The album was released on August 4, 2009, and produced by Paul Brown.

== Track listing ==
1. "Tropical Rain" (Gregg Karukas, Paul Brown, Jessy J) – 4:15
2. "Forever" (Paul Brown, Jessy J, Thomas Klemperer) – 4:08
3. "True Love" (Jessy J) – 3:48
4. "Mr. Prince" (Jessy J, Paul Brown) – 3:58
5. "Morning of the Carnival" from Black Orpheus (Manha Dee Carnaval) (Louiz Bonfa, Antonio Maria) – 3:58
6. "Somewhere in a Dream" (Jessy J, Paul Brown) – 4:15
7. "Jessy's Blues" (Jessy J, Paul Brown" – 3:39
8. "Llegaste tú" (Pablo Aguirre, Paulina Aguirre, Jessy J) – 3:40
9. "Brazilian Dance" (Sergio Aranda) – 3:51
10. "Baila!" (Jessy J, Paul Brown) – 3:47

== Personnel ==
Musicians

- Jessy J – tenor saxophone (1–5, 7, 10), flute (1, 5, 7, 10), arrangements (3–7, 10), vocals (5, 6, 8, 10), soprano saxophone (6, 9)
- Gregg Karukas – keyboards (1, 4–7), arrangements (1, 5), acoustic piano (2, 3, 7, 10), strings (2–6, 10), bass (5)
- Pablo Aguirre – programming (8)
- Sergio Aranda – acoustic piano (9), vocals (9)
- Tommy Kay – guitars (2), arrangements (2)
- Tom Strahle – guitars (8)
- Roberto Vally – bass (1–4, 6, 7, 10), chorus vocals (10)
- Sergio Gonzalez – drums (1, 3, 4, 6, 7, 10)
- Paul Brown – arrangements (1, 2, 4–7, 10), drum programming (2, 5), guitars (3, 4, 6, 7, 10), chorus vocals (10)
- Richie Gajate-Garcia – percussion (1, 3, 4, 6, 7, 10), chorus vocals (10)
- Danilo Arroyo – percussion (8)
- Paulina Aguirre – chorus vocals (8)
- Kenny O'Brien – chorus vocals (8)
- Cameron Smith – chorus vocals (10)

Production

- Paul Brown – producer (1–7, 10), recording (1–7, 10), mixing (1–7, 10)
- Pablo Aguirre – producer (8, 9), recording (8, 9)
- Dragan "DC" Capor – recording (1–7, 10), mixing (1–7, 10)
- Eric Astor – recording assistant (1–7, 10)
- Nick Tashjian – recording assistant (1–7, 10)
- Pepe Clark – recording assistant (8, 9)
- Abraham Pacas – recording assistant (8, 9)
- Lee Herschberg – mastering at Herschberg Mastering (Camarillo, California)
- Larissa Collins – art direction
- Michael Gassel – package design
- Lori Stoll – photography
- Steve Chapman and Chapman & Co. Management, Inc. – management

== Charts ==
Chart performance for True Love
Chart (2009)	Peak position
US Jazz Albums (Billboard)	7
