= Roberto Perera =

- Born: 1952; Montevideo, Uruguay
- Genres: Jazz fusion, smooth jazz, Latin jazz
- Occupation: Musician
- Instrument: Harp
- Years active: 1980–present
- Labels: Heads Up

Roberto Perera (born 1952) is an Uruguayan jazz harpist, in the smooth jazz and fusion styles. Born in 1952 in Montevideo, the capital city of Uruguay, Perera was barely 12 years old when his mother enrolled him in a music conservatory where he selected the rare 36-string Paraguayan harp. Perera's complex technique includes precisely bending the strings to create sharps and flats while gliding across the harp in a seemingly effortless fashion, which bespeaks the tremendous amount of skill and discipline required.

About the time Perera started playing the harp, the Beatles were in their heyday. The young musician absorbed their music as well as other pop music influences into his musical muse, which included Brazilian music, folk and tango from South America, and the folk music from Paraguay. Unable to find an instructor who could teach him how to perform a pop music repertoire on the harp, he experimented until he was able to overcome the instrument's technical hurdles and develop his own form of expression.

In 1973, after completing ten years of harp studies in Montevideo, Perera moved to New York City with hopes of pursuing a top-notch music career. At first, his experience was not the American dream he had imagined, as his performances were limited primarily to playing folk tunes at clubs and restaurants. Perera paid his dues in New York for a couple of years before he was recruited by a talent scout to entertain at an exclusive private club in Florida. There he finally was allowed to perform his own compositions and further develop his distinctive style, having applied the musical influences of Weather Report and Antônio Carlos Jobim. He'd starting approaching the harp as a percussive instrument, much like a piano, instead of a string instrument.

By the time his recording debut, Erotica, was released by Epic Records in 1990, Perera had earned a reputation as one of the pioneers in electro-acoustic harp performance. His five albums for Heads Up infused the jazz-pop idiom with a wide range of multicultural flavorings, punctuated with guest performances by Trinidadian steel drummer Othello Molineaux, Nicaraguan salsa singer Luis Enrique, Floridian hand percussionist Robert Thomas Jr., and Cuban jazz reedman Paquito D'Rivera.

In 1993 he won the Billboard Contemporary Latin Jazz Album of the Year award for his second Heads Up album, Dreams & Desires. He was selected musical director for the Hispanic Heritage Awards at the Kennedy Center in 1997 and 1998 was voted Favorite Jazz Artist in his category numerous times in the annual Jazziz magazine reader's poll. He guested on numerous recordings including D'Rivera's 100 Years of Latin Love Songs and Gloria Estefan's Abriendo Puertas. Perera's own compositions for In the Mood include "Joia" and "Six A.M." A different approach is taken on "Coming Home," written by Perera in the style Paraguayan folk music but adapted to the contemporary jazz idiom for In the Mood.

== Discography ==
- 1990 Erótica (Epic)
- 1991 Passions, Illusions and Fantasies (Heads Up)
- 1992 Dreams & Desires (Heads Up)
- 1994 Seduction (Heads Up)
- 1996 Harp and Soul (Heads Up)
- 1996 Christmas Fantasies (Heads Up)
- 1999 In the Mood (Heads Up)
- 2002 Sensual (Heads Up)
- 2010 Magical (Harpa)
- 2017 Siempre, Lo Que Quiero...
