= Better Days Ahead (album) =

Studio album by Norman Brown
- Released: June 18, 1996
- Studio: Titan Recording (Van Nuys, California); In Your Ear Recording (Los Angeles, California); Ocean Way Recording, Record Plant and Music Grinder Studios (Hollywood, California); Larrabee Sound Studios (North Hollywood, California); Saturn Sound (Studio City, California); The Enterprise (Burbank, California)
- Genre: Jazz
- Length: 55:18
- Label: Motown
- Producer: Norman Brown; The Characters; Charles Farrar; Herman Jackson; Troy Taylor; Michael Vail Blum

Norman Brown chronology
After the Storm (1994)	Better Days Ahead (1996)	Celebration (1999)

Professional ratings
Review scores
Source	Rating
AllMusic	3/5 stars

Better Days Ahead is the third studio album by jazz guitarist Norman Brown, released in 1996 on Motown Records. Earth, Wind & Fire Horns appear on the album. The album reached No. 2 on the Billboard Top Jazz Albums chart.

== Track listing ==
No.	Title	Writer(s)	Length
1.	"This Time Around"	Norman Brown	4:25
2.	"Better Days Ahead"	Norman Brown	5:42
3.	"After the Love Has Gone"	Bill Champlin, David Foster, Jay Graydon	5:03
4.	"Places in the Heart"	Norman Brown	6:32
5.	"Third World"	Norman Brown	5:16
6.	"Come Closer to Me"	Norman Brown	4:59
7.	"N-Control"	Norman Brown	5:27
8.	"Serenade"	Norman Brown	6:10
9.	"Your Body's Callin'"	R. Kelly	5:49
10.	"Facts of Love"	Norman Brown, Kenneth William Hirsch, Kimberly Ross	5:55

== Personnel ==
- Norman Brown – guitars (1–9), arrangements (1–9), vocal scat (3), vocal arrangements (3, 6), lead guitar (10)
- Gail Johnson – keyboards (1), organ (7), synthesizers (7)
- Wayne Livsey – keyboards (1, 7)
- Herman Jackson – keyboards (2, 4–6, 8), synthesizer programming (3), drum programming (3), arrangements (3), grand piano (4, 8)
- The Characters (Charles Farrar and Troy Taylor) – instruments (9, 10)
- Troy Taylor – backing vocals (9, 10), additional arrangements (8), synthesizer programming (10), drum programming (10), rhythm and vocal arrangements (10)
- Larry Kimpel – bass (1, 2, 4–8)
- James Manning – bass (3)
- Rayford Griffin – drums (1, 2, 4–8)
- Munyungo Jackson – percussion (1, 2, 4–6)
- Gary Bias – horns (6, 7)
- Reggie Young – horns (6, 7)
- Ray Brown – horns (6, 7), orchestration (6, 7)
- Bridgette Bryant – backing vocals (3), vocals (6)
- Lynne Fiddmont-Linsey – backing vocals (3), vocal arrangements (3, 6), vocals (6)
- Arnold McCuller – backing vocals (3)
- Carl "Neuron" Thomas – backing vocals (9)

=== Production ===
- Bruce Walker – executive producer
- Norman Brown – executive producer, producer (1–8, 10)
- Herman Jackson – co-producer (1–8)
- Michael Vail Blum – co-producer (1, 2, 4–8), recording, mixing
- The Characters – producers (9, 10)
- Eliud "Lou" Ortiz – recording, mixing
- Ralph Sutton – recording
- Richard Huredia – recording assistant
- Tony Rambo – recording assistant
- James Saez – recording assistant
- Michael Sangrey – recording assistant
- Erick Labson – mastering at MCA Music Media Studios (North Hollywood, California)
- Eric Talbert – A&R direction
- Chad Gary – A&R production coordinator
- Kimberly Ross – production management assistant
- David Irvin – design
- Carol Friedman – art direction, photography
- Ellen Silverstein – wardrobe styling
- Michael Evans – hair stylist
- Quitefire – make-up
- Bruce Kramer – management
