= Joyce Cooling =

American jazz guitarist, vocalist, and songwriter

- Born: December 31, 1969; Perth Amboy, New Jersey, U.S.
- Genres: Jazz
- Occupations: Musician, singer, songwriter
- Instruments: Guitar, Vocals, Bass
- Years active: 1980–present
- Labels: Heads Up, GRP, Narada
- Website: Official site

Joyce Cooling is an American jazz guitarist, vocalist, and songwriter. She has performed with Joe Henderson, Stan Getz, Mark Murphy, Al Jarreau, and Charlie Byrd.

== Music career ==
Cooling was born into a musical family. Her mother, a music teacher, was a classical music aficionado. After moving to California from New York in the early 1980s, Cooling began sitting in on the percussion classes of Ghanaian drummer C. K. Ladzekpo. Integrating the polyrhythms of West African music with her passion for melody and harmony, Cooling focused her attention on guitar and taught herself to play by ear.

She met keyboardist Jay Wagner on San Francisco's Brazilian jazz circuit. Wagner was an original member of the San Francisco-based group Viva Brasil. She joined Viva Brasil part-time in 1988 as a guitarist and background vocalist. Cooling's and Wagner's chemistry and passion for songwriting resulted in their first collaboration, Cameo (1989), recorded with members of Viva Brasil.

Cooling and Wagner formed a band in 1990, performing and recording for the next six years. By 1996 they had completed their second self-produced album, Person2Person. The album came to the attention of Heads Up International, which signed the duo to a two-record deal. They added four additional tracks and renamed the album Playing It Cool. The album was released internationally in the fall of 1997. Cooling's second Heads Up album, Keeping Cool, was released in the spring of 1999. In 2000, Cooling and Wagner signed with GRP/Verve Music Group and released their fourth album, Third Wish, on September 11, 2001. In October 2001, Cooling recorded "The Christmas Song" with Lee Ritenour for the 2001 GRP holiday compilation Making Spirits Bright. Cooling and Wagner's fifth album, This Girl's Got to Play, was released by Narada.

Cooling's sixth album, Revolving Door, was released by Narada Jazz when it merged with Blue Note in 2006. Although Cooling had been a member of the National Alliance on Mental Illness (NAMI), she became a national advocate for the organization with Revolving Door. She has performed at NAMI national and regional events across the country. She and Wagner donate a portion of the proceeds from the sale of their albums to NAMI.

They released their song "It's Feeling Like Christmas" in 2008 with an accompanying music video produced by Progressive Pulse.

== Discography ==
- Cameo (Nucleus, 1989)
- Playing It Cool (Heads Up, 1997)
- Keeping Cool (Heads Up, 1999)
- Third Wish (GRP, 2001)
- This Girl's Got to Play (Narada Jazz, 2004)
- Revolving Door (Narada Jazz, 2006)
- Global Cooling (Group 2, 2009)
- Living Out Loud (Group 2, 2019)
- The Holiday's On (Rhythm Kitchen, 2022)
