= Lost in Los Angeles =

American indie and alternative rock music band

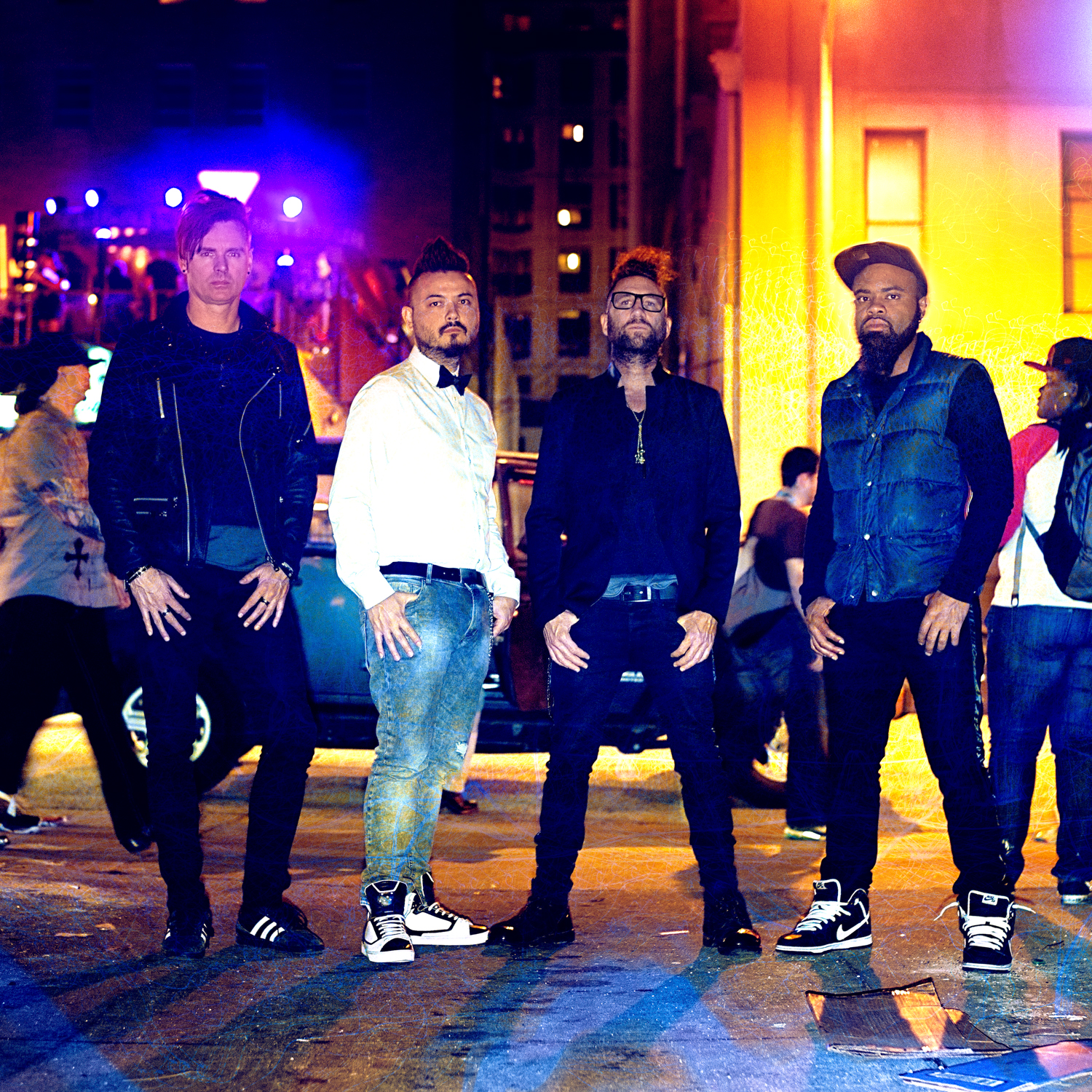
- From left to right: Clark Souter, Eddie Deering, Danny Klein, Iajhi Hampden

Background information
- Origin: Los Angeles, California, United States
- Genres: Alternative rock
- Years active: 2006–present
- Labels: Spark Farm Records, Cartel Records
- Members: Danny Klein; Eddie Deering; Clark Souter; Iajhi Hampden
- Website: www.lostinlosangeles.com

Lost in Los Angeles (LiLA) is an American indie and alternative rock music band formed in Los Angeles, California in 2006. They received the 35th Annual Telly Award in New York City for Best Music Video, "Million Stars" which aired on MTV, VH1, and Spike.

== Concert tours ==
- 2013 - JVC Mobile Entertainment Plugged-In U.S. Tour – The five-week national tour covered 28 cities across the United States. Lost in Los Angeles toured with bands ‘Girl on Fire’ and ‘AngelsFall'.
- 2013 - East Coast Radio & Club Tour - The band took a mini-tour to the east coast tri-state area New York, New Jersey, and Philadelphia. The band performed at various radio stations and played shows at Fontana’s Club in New York City, The Hard rock in Philadelphia and Mexicali Live in Teaneck, New Jersey.
- 2014 - SXSW 2014 - The band went on the road performing a string of five shows at South By Southwest, Austin, TX.

== Record labels ==
- 2013 - Spark Farm Records
- 2007 - 2013 - Griffin Guess, Cartel Records

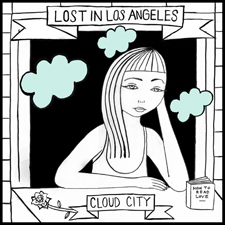
Lost in Los Angeles: Cloud City Single Cover

== Albums ==
- 2014 - LOVE IS FATE (LP)
- 2014 - CLOUD CITY (SINGLES & B-SIDES)
- 2013 - BURNIN (December Sessions Remix)
- 2013 - BECAUSE OF YOU (RADIO EDIT & B-SIDES)
- 2013 - THE HOVERING (EP)
- 2012 - "DAYBREAK" (Single)
- 2010 - LILA (LP)

== Awards and accolades ==
- 2006 - 35th Annual Telly Award Winner for Best Music Video, Million Stars.
