= Andy Narell =

American jazz steel pannist and composer

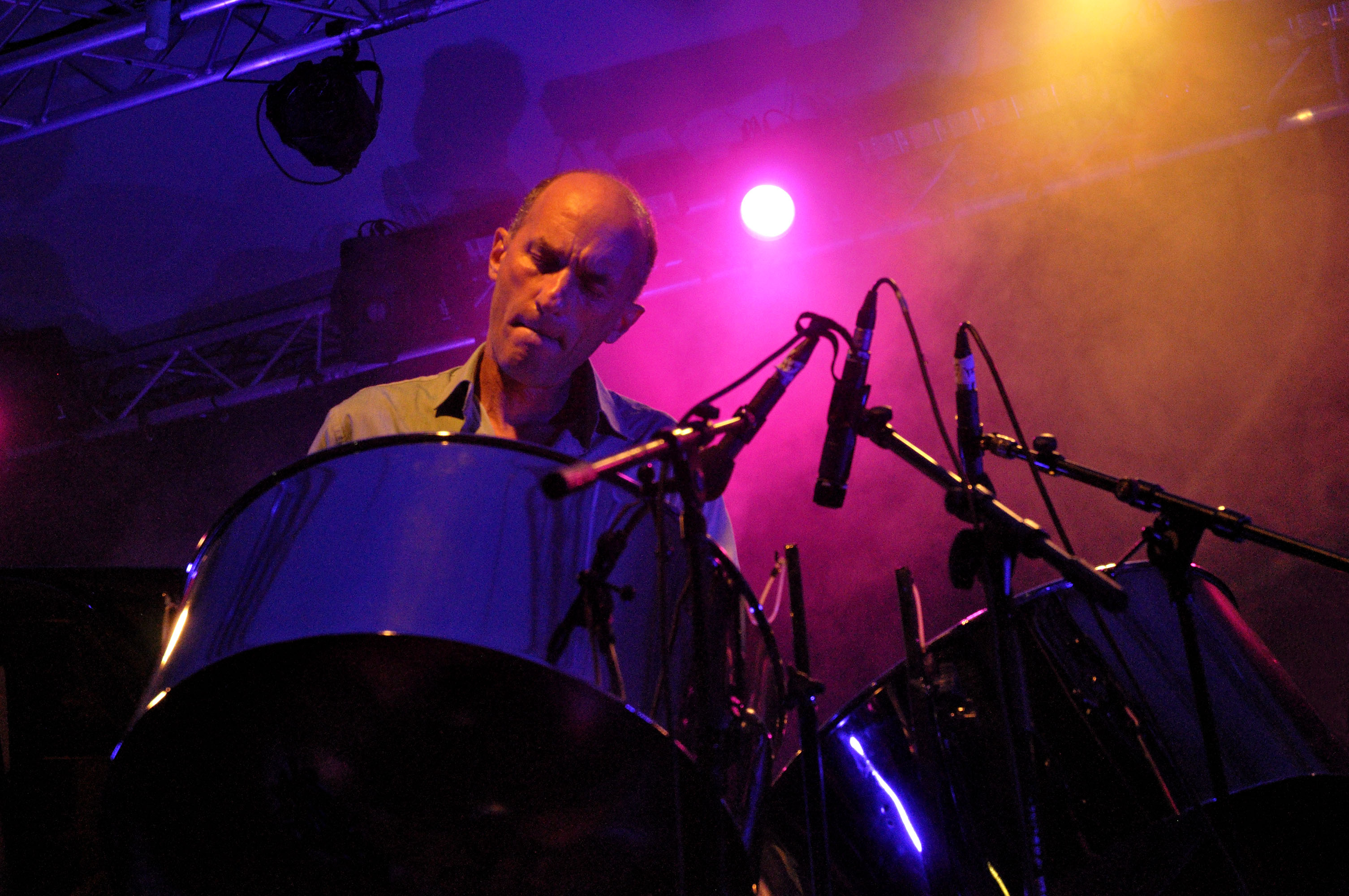
- Narell in 2009

Background information
- Born: March 18, 1954 (age 72); New York City, U.S.
- Genres: Jazz, Latin jazz
- Occupations: Musician, composer, arranger, music educator
- Instrument: Steel pans
- Years active: 1973–present
- Labels: Inner City, Hip Pocket, Windham Hill, Heads Up

Andy Narell (born March 18, 1954) is an American jazz steel pannist, composer and producer.

== Biography ==
Narell took up the steelpan at a young age in Queens, New York. His father, who was a social worker, had started a program of steelpan playing for at-risk youth at the Jewish philanthropic Education Alliance in Lower East Side Manhattan using two sets of pans made by Rupert Sterling, a native of Antigua. Beginning in 1962, Andy, his brother Jeff, and three others boys played on a third set of Sterling-made pans in the basement of the Narell house in the Whitestone neighborhood of Queens, calling themselves the Steel Bandits. The band was a novelty steelpan act that played concerts and appeared on television shows, including I've Got a Secret in 1963.

The band played Carnegie Hall and at the National Music Festival of Trinidad. Murray Narell invited Ellie Mannette in 1964 to expand steelpan activities in New York City and convinced him to come in 1967. Mannette taught the Narell boys more technique, and they played on improved pans tuned by Mannette.

Narell studied music at the University of California, Berkeley and played piano with the University of California Jazz Ensembles under the direction of David W. Tucker. He graduated in 1973.

He started the record label Hip Pocket and released his first solo album, Hidden Treasures, in 1979. With an interest in Caribbean music, Latin jazz, and rhythm and blues, he joined the Caribbean Jazz Project in 1995 with Dave Samuels and Paquito D'Rivera.

He has performed with Montreux, Sakésho, Calypsociation, and Béla Fleck and the Flecktones. He composed and arranged music for Trinidad's national steelband competition, Panorama. Narell performed in South Africa in 1999 in front of a crowd of 80,000 people.

== Panorama involvement ==
In 1999 Narrell became the first foreigner to compose for Panorama steel band competition in Trinidad, guiding the 100-player Skiffle Bunch Steel Orchestra to the finals of both the 1999 and 2000 Panoramas. After a 12 year hiatus, Narell returned to Panorama in 2013 and the subsequent three years to arrange for Birdsong. His arrangements have continued to introduce musical ideas that have not been done before in Panorama, such as the 6/8 time in a section of "We Kinda Music" in 2014. Some critics have dismissed his music as jazz or avant-garde rather than Panorama.

== Discography ==
=== As leader ===
- Hidden Treasure (Inner City, 1979)
- Stickman (Hip Pocket, 1981)
- Light in Your Eyes (Hip Pocket, 1983)
- Slow Motion (Hip Pocket, 1985)
- The Hammer (Windham Hill, 1987)
- Little Secrets (Windham Hill, 1989)
- Down the Road (Windham Hill, 1992)
- The Long Time Band (Windham Hill, 1995)
- Behind the Bridge (Heads Up, 1998)
- Fire in the Engine Room (Heads Up, 2000)
- Live in South Africa (Heads Up, 2001)
- The Passage (Heads Up, 2004)
- Tatoom (Heads Up, 2007)
- University of Calypso (Heads Up, 2009)
- Oui ma Chérie! (Andy Narell, 2014)
- Dis 1. 4. Raf (Andy Narell, 2016)
- We Kinda Music (Andy Narell, 2017)

With Caribbean Jazz Project

- The Caribbean Jazz Project (Heads Up, 1995)
- Island Stories (Heads Up, 1999)

With Sakésho

- Sakésho (Heads Up, 2002)
- We Want You to Say... (Heads Up, 2005)

=== As guest ===
- Darol Anger, Heritage (Six Degrees, 1997)
- Darol Anger/Barbara Higbie Quintet, Live at Montreux (Windham Hill, 1985)
- Angela Bofill, Something About You (Arista, 1981)
- Richie Cole, Signature (Milestone, 1988)
- Paulinho da Costa, Breakdown (A&M, 1991)
- Pete Escovedo, Flying South (Concord Picante, 1995)
- Béla Fleck, Outbound (Columbia, 2000)
- Béla Fleck, Live at the Quick (Columbia, 2002)
- Aretha Franklin, Who's Zoomin' Who? (Arista, 1985)
- Alex De Grassi, The World's Getting Loud (Windham Hill, 1993)
- Jimmy Haslip, Arc (GRP, 1993)
- Greg Kihn, Citizen Kihn (EMI, 1985)
- Boney James, Ride (Warner Bros., 2001)
- Biréli Lagrène, Electric Side (Dreyfus, 2008)
- Patti LaBelle, Tasty (Epic, 1978)
- The Manhattan Transfer, Mecca for Moderns (Atlantic, 1981)
- Les McCann, Listen Up! (MusicMasters, 1996)
- Marcus Miller, The Sun Don't Lie (Dreyfus, 1993)
- Ray Obiedo, Sticks & Stones (Windham Hill, 1993)
- Ray Obiedo, Zulaya (Windham Hill, 1995)
- John Patitucci, Another World (GRP, 1993)
- Kim Pensyl, Eyes of Wonder (GRP, 1993)
- Peter, Paul and Mary, Reunion (Warner Bros., 1978)
- The Pointer Sisters, Having a Party (ABC, 1977)
- Paquito D'Rivera, Panamericana Suite (MCG, 2010)
- Pete Sears, Watchfire (Redwood, 1988)
- Ben Sidran, Life's a Lesson (Go Jazz, 1993)
- Phoebe Snow, It Looks Like Snow (Columbia, 1976)
- Spyro Gyra, Original Cinema (Heads Up, 2002)
- Spyro Gyra, Good to Go-Go (Heads Up, 2007)
- Taj Mahal, Satisfied 'n' Tickled Too (Columbia, 1976)
- Toto, The Seventh One (CBS, 1988)
- Vince Mendoza, Nights on Earth (Art of Groove, 2011)
- Nancy Wilson, Turned to Blue (MCG, 2006)
- Link Wray, The Link Wray Rumble (Polydor, 1974)
- Vital Information, Easier Done Than Said (Manhattan, 1992)
- Narada Michael Walden, Looking at You, Looking at Me (Atlantic, 1983)
