= Zestfulness =

== See also ==
- Zest (positive psychology)
