= Norman Brown (guitarist) =

American jazz guitarist and singer (born 1962)

- Born: December 18, 1962 (age 63); Shreveport, Louisiana, U.S.
- Genres: Smooth jazz, jazz-rock, soul jazz, fusion
- Occupations: Musician, singer
- Instruments: Guitar, vocals
- Years active: 1992–present
- Labels: Mo Jazz; Warner Bros.; Peak; Shanachie
- Website: www.normanbrown.com

Norman Brown (born December 18, 1962) is an American smooth jazz guitarist and singer.

== Career ==
Brown was born in Shreveport, Louisiana in 1962 and grew up in Kansas City, Kansas. When he was eight years old, he was attracted to his brother's acoustic guitar. He was inspired by Jimi Hendrix and the Isley Brothers. When he heard Wes Montgomery, he began to play jazz. He attended the Musicians Institute in Hollywood. After graduating in 1984, he joined the staff and was an instructor until 1998. In 1991, he signed with Mo Jazz, a division of Motown.

In 1992 he released his debut album, Just Between Us. Collaborators included Boyz II Men, Stevie Wonder, and Kenneth H. Williams. The album was produced by Norman Connors, a jazz drummer and producer who discovered Brown. In 1994 Brown released the album After the Storm, which gained critical success and was awarded jazz album of the year by Soul Train Music Awards. It also won a Gavin Radio Award by remaining on the charts for over two years. He followed this album with the 1996 release Better Days Ahead, which earned him a broader audience and the American Jazz Award. In 1999, he returned from a three year hiatus and signed with Warner Bros., releasing Celebration, which was produced by Norman Brown, Paul Brown, and Herman Jackson.

In 2002, he formed BWB with saxophonist Kirk Whalum and trumpeter Rick Braun, and they released the album Groovin' . During the summer of 2007, Brown had a No. 1 smooth jazz radio hit, "Let's Take a Ride", from the album Stay with Me, according to Radio and Records magazine. In 2008, the Verve Music Group re-released Just Between Us as part of its "Verve Originals" series. Brown's music can be heard during The Weather Channel's Local on the 8s segments. His song "Lydian" is included in their 2008 compilation album, The Weather Channel Presents: Smooth Jazz II. In 2011, Brown collaborated with Gerald Albright to record 24/7 which had a number one single, "In the Moment", and earned him a Grammy Award nomination.

== Accolades ==
=== Grammy Awards ===
The Grammy Awards are awarded annually by the National Academy of Recording Arts and Sciences. Brown has won one award out of two nominations.

Year	Category	Nominated work	Result
2003	Best Contemporary Instrumental Album	"Just Chillin'"	Won
2013	Best Contemporary Instrumental Album	24/7	Nominated

== Discography ==
Year	Title	Peak chart positions				Label
Year	Title	US	US R&B	US Jazz	US Con. Jazz	Label
1992	Just Between Us	—	51	—	4	Mo Jazz
1994	After the Storm	140	21	2	2	Mo Jazz
1996	Better Days Ahead	162	31	2	2	Mo Jazz
1999	Celebration	—	50	4	3	Warner Bros.
2002	Just Chillin'	198	50	3	2	Warner Bros.
2004	West Coast Coolin'	160	24	5	3	Warner Bros.
2007	Stay with Me	107	11	1	1	Peak
2010	Sending My Love	—	—	3	2	Peak
2012	24/7 (with Gerald Albright)	—	—	1	1	Concord
2017	Let It Go	—	—	1	1	Shanachie
2019	The Highest Act of Love	—	—	4	1	Shanachie
2020	Heart to Heart	—	—	15	4	Shanachie
2022	Let's Get Away	—	—	n/a	8	Shanachie
2024	It Hits Different	—	—	n/a	n/a	Shanachie
"—" denotes a recording that did not chart.

as BWB (Braun-Whalum-Brown)

Year	Title	Peak chart positions				Label
Year	Title	US	US Jazz	US Con. Jazz	US Heat	Label
2002	Groovin'	—	9	4	6	Warner Bros.
2013	Human Nature: The Songs of Michael Jackson	184	4	2	5	Heads Up
2016	BWB	—	13	1	4	Artistry Music/Mack Avenue
"—" denotes a recording that did not chart.

=== Singles ===
Year	Title	Peak chart positions				Album
Year	Title	Hot R&B/ Hip-Hop Songs	Smooth Jazz Airplay	Adult R&B Airplay	Holiday Airplay	Album
1994	"That's the Way Love Goes"	93	—N/a	—	—N/a	After the Storm
2000	"You Make Me Feel Brand New"	—	—N/a	39	—N/a	Celebration
2000	"Rain"	—	—N/a	15	—N/a	Celebration
2003	"Feeling the Way"	—	—N/a	32	—N/a	Just Chillin'
2004	"I Might"	—	—N/a	15	—N/a	West Coast Coolin'
2005	"Angel"	—	—N/a	36	—N/a	West Coast Coolin'
2005	"West Coast Coolin'"	—	16	—	—N/a	West Coast Coolin'
2005	"Up 'n' at Em"	—	38	—	—N/a	West Coast Coolin'
2007	"Stay with Me"	80	—	20	—N/a	Stay with Me
2007	"Let's Take a Ride"	—	1	—	—N/a	Stay with Me
2008	"Pop's Cool Groove"	—	2	—	—N/a	Stay with Me
2010	"Sending My Love"	—	2	—	—N/a	Sending My Love
2011	"Come Go with Me"	—	15	—	—N/a	Sending My Love
2011	"Charlie Brown Christmas"	—	—	—	31	A MoJazz Christmas, Volume 2
2012	"In the Moment" (Gerald Albright / Norman Brown)	—	1	—	—	Gerald Albright / Norman Brown – 24/7
2013	"Champagne Life" (Gerald Albright / Norman Brown)	—	1	—	—	Gerald Albright / Norman Brown – 24/7
2013	"Man in the Mirror" (bwb)	—	3	—	—	bwb – Human Nature
2014	"Shake Your Body (Down to the Ground)" (bwb)	—	1	—	—	bwb – Human Nature
2014	"Billie Jean" (bwb)	—	22	—	—	bwb – Human Nature
2014	"Second Chances" (Jessy J featuring Norman Brown)	—	19	—	—	Jessy J – Second Chances
2016	"bwb" (bwb)	—	1	—	—	bwb – BWB
2016	"Triple Dare" (bwb)	—	1	—	—	bwb – BWB
2016	"I Want You Girl" (bwb)	—	4	—	—	bwb – BWB
2017	"It Keeps Coming Back"	—	1	—	—	Let It Go
2019	"The King Is Here"	—	1	—	—	The Highest Act of Love
2019	"Peace of Mind"	—	11	—	—	The Highest Act of Love
2020	"Mo Jazzin" (Johnny Britt featuring Norman Brown)	—	12	—	—	Johnny Britt – Mo Jazzin'
2020	"Heading Wes"	—	6	—	—	Heart to Heart
2021	"Just Groovin'"	—	1	—	—	Heart to Heart
2021	"Heart to Heart"	—	15	—	—	Heart to Heart
2022	"Back at Ya"	—	12	—	—	Let's Get Away
2022	"Easy Livin'"	—	25	—	—	Let's Get Away
2023	"Let's Get Away"	—	7	—	—	Let's Get Away
2024	"Anything"	—	1	—	—	It Hits Different
2024	"Strollin'" (Norman Brown featuring Tom Schuman)	—	3	—	—	It Hits Different
2025	"No Regrets" (Phylicia Rae featuring Norman Brown)	—	3	—	—	Phylicia Rae – TBD
2025	"Casual Cool"	—	2	—	—	It Hits Different
2026	"Chillax"	—	2	—	—	Authentically Norman
2026	"Home Stretch"	—	23	—	—	Authentically Norman
"—" denotes a recording that did not chart.

== See also ==
- BWB
- List of smooth jazz performers
