= Still Small Voice (album) =

Studio album by Paul Jackson Jr.
- Released: May 20, 2003
- Genre: Jazz
- Length: 61:04
- Label: Blue Note

Professional ratings
Review scores
Source	Rating
Allmusic	4/5 stars
Jazz Times	(favourable)

Still Small Voice is a studio album by guitarist Paul Jackson Jr. released in 2003 on Blue Note Records.The album peaked at No. 29 on the Billboard Jazz Albums chart.

== Track listing ==
No.	Title	Writer(s)	Length
1.	"Still Small Voice"	Paul Jackson Jr.	5:50
2.	"Blue Note"	Alan V. Abrahams, Keith Anderson, Margaret Fowler, Paul Jackson, Jr.	5:31
3.	"Dios Te Bendiga"	Paul Jackson, Jr.	4:40
4.	"Walkin'"	Brian Culbertson, Paul Jackson, Jr., Jerry Reed	4:04
5.	"It's A Shame"	Lee Garett, Johnny Rawls, Stevie Wonder, Syreeta Wright	4:12
6.	"Park Tour Intro."	Paul Jackson Jr.	0:48
7.	"Athens Park"	Paul Jackson Jr.	4:01
8.	"Crystal Park"	Paul Jackson Jr., James Reese	6:31
9.	"Sportsman Park"	Paul Jackson Jr., Jeff Lorber	4:50
10.	"1:15"	Paul Jackson Jr.	4:36
11.	"Lillian"	Paul Jackson Jr., Kevin Membley	5:08
12.	"Changed"	Alan V. Abrahams, Nickolas Ashford, Margaret Fowler, Paul Jackson, Jr., Valerie Simpson, Bobby Sparks	5:57
13.	"Back at One"	Brian McKnight	4:56
