= Gary Bias =

American musician

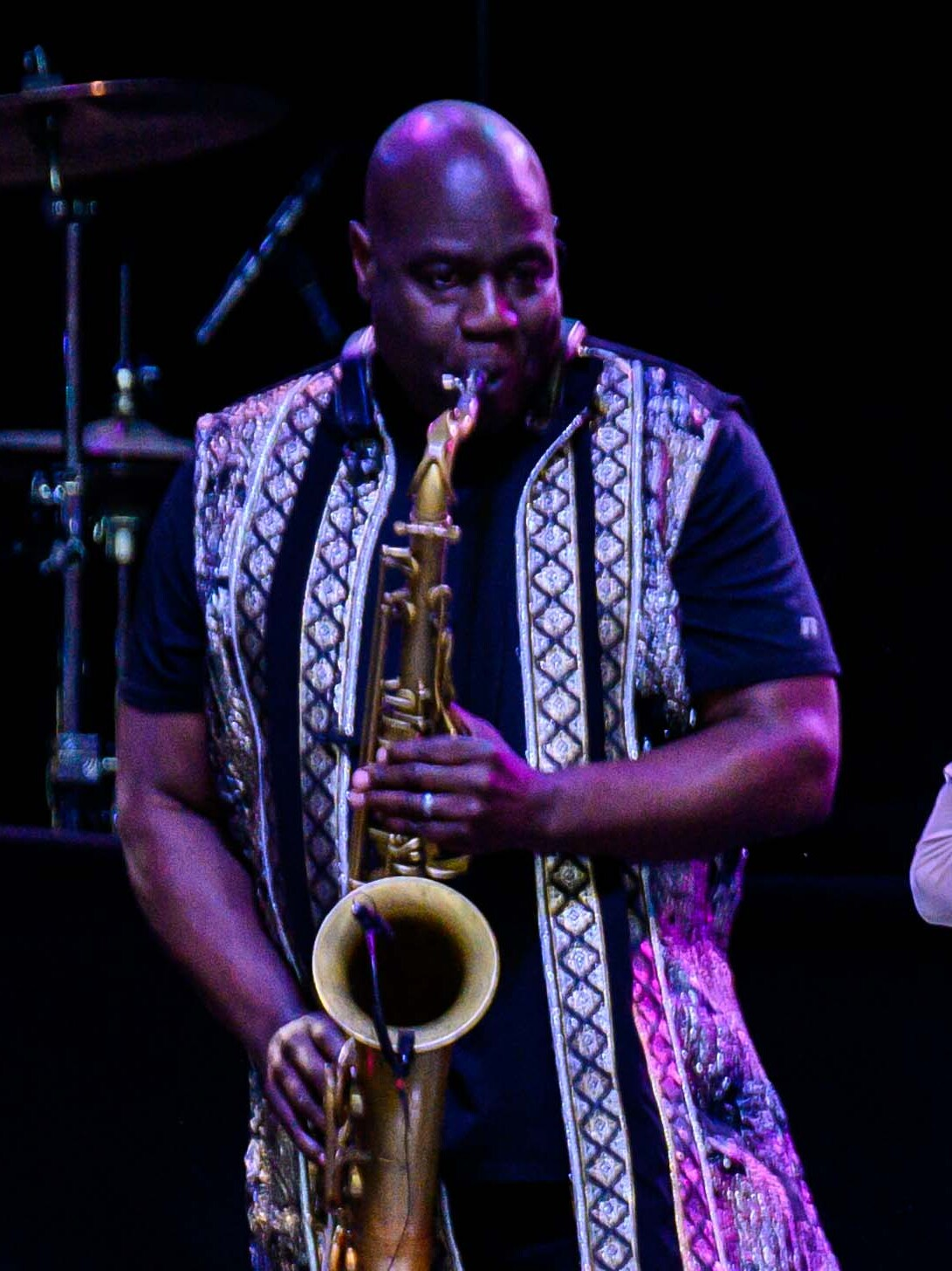
- Bias with Earth, Wind & Fire in 2022

Background information
- Born: Los Angeles, California, U.S.
- Origin: Los Angeles, California, U.S.
- Genres: Jazz, R&B, funk
- Occupations: Musician, composer
- Instruments: Saxophone, flute
- Years active: 1981–present
- Labels: Nimbus, Thunderbop
- Member of: Earth, Wind & Fire Horns

Gary Bias is an American saxophonist, flutist and composer. Bias is a longtime member of the Earth, Wind & Fire Horns.

== Overview ==
He born and raised in Los Angeles, California. Bias began playing the saxophone at the age of 11. He went on to attend Locke High School with Gerald Albright and Patrice Rushen.

During 1981 Bias released his debut album entitled East 101 upon Nimbus Records. He went on to play the sax upon reggae band Third World's 1983 album All the Way Strong. Bias then served as a composer on Najee's 1986 LP Najee's Theme and Mongo Santamaria's 1987 album So Yo.

During 1987 Bias also won a Grammy Award within the category of Best Rhythm & Blues Song for co-composing Anita Baker's "Sweet Love". Within the same year he went on to join up with Earth, Wind & Fire. Bias then played and composed upon the band's 1990 album Heritage. As well he featured as a saxophonist on Whitney Houston's album of the same year being I'm Your Baby Tonight.

Bias then played upon MC Hammer's 1991 album Too Legit to Quit and Salif Keita's 1991 LP Amen. In 1999 Bias released his sophomore LP entitled "2 B Free" upon Thunderbop Records.

== Discography ==
- "East 101" (Nimbus, 1981)
- "2 B Free" (Thunderbop, 1999)
