= Heads Up International =

Jazz record label

- Parent company: BMG Rights Management
- Founded: 1990
- Founder: Dave Love
- Genre: Jazz, contemporary jazz
- Country of origin: U.S.
- Location: Cleveland, Ohio
- Official website: at Concord

Heads Up International is a jazz record label that was formed in Cleveland, Ohio. It was bought by the Concord Music Group in 2005 who would later merge with BMG Rights Management.

== History ==
The label got its name from a jazz group that Dave Love formed while attending North Texas State University. After college, Love became musical director for Donald Byrd. Later, he recorded an album with his band and soprano saxophonist Dave Liebman.

While trying to sell the album to record labels, he took a position as National Director of Sales & Marketing for Oxymoron P&D, where executives convinced him to start his own label with his album. Using Oxymoron for distribution, Love began Heads Up International in Seattle, Washington, in 1990. The label's first album was The Energy of the Chance by Dave Liebman. In 2000, Heads Up International merged with Telarc International Corporation.

In 2005 the two companies were acquired by the Concord Music Group. The label's roster includes Mindi Abair, Richard Elliot, Fourplay, Mike Stern, and Peter White. Its catalog includes Stanley Clarke, George Duke, Hiroshima, Earl Klugh, Jeff Lorber, Spyro Gyra, and Take 6.

== Special releases ==
The Heads Up Africa series was begun to mark the tenth anniversary of the end of apartheid. Musicians such as Ladysmith Black Mambazo, Miriam Makeba, Hugh Masekela, and Oliver Mtukudzi have recorded for the label.

In 2007, Heads Up released the final albums by Michael Brecker (Pilgrimage) and Joe Zawinul (Brown Street). Heads Up began its 18th year with recordings by George Duke, Taj Mahal, Esperanza Spalding, Take 6, and Victor Wooten.

For more than 12 years, the label has produced enhanced CDs with video, biographies, and other bonus material. Heads Up was among the first labels to release music in the Super Audio CD (SACD) format and the first to incorporate enhanced CD technology with SACDs.

== Awards and honors ==
Heads Up International's musicians have appeared on the Billboard Contemporary Jazz, Traditional Jazz, and World Music charts. The label's awards include the Billboard Contemporary Latin Jazz Album of the Year (Dreams & Desires by Roberto Perera), the AFIM's Independent Contemporary Jazz Album of the Year (Love's Silhouette by Pieces of a Dream) a Grammy Award nomination in 2004 (Time Squared by the Yellowjackets), a Grammy Award for Best Traditional World Music Album in 2005 (Raise Your Spirit Higher by Ladysmith Black Mambazo), a Grammy nomination for Best Surround Sound Award in the first surround sound category at the Grammys (Raise Your Spirit Higher by Ladysmith Black Mambazo), ten additional Grammy nominations for Spyro Gyra, Mike Stern, the JazzWeek Radio Programmers Album of the Year Award for two consecutive years (Word of Mouth Revisited and The Word Is Out! by Jaco Pastorius), and Gibson Guitar's Best Female Jazz Guitarist (Joyce Cooling). Heads Up artists have regularly captured the No. 1 position in national radio airplay.

== Roster ==
- Mindi Abair
- Gerald Albright
- Acoustic Alchemy
- Ann Armstrong
- The Bad Plus
- Philip Bailey
- Walter Beasley
- Kenny Blake
- Bona Fide
- Michael Brecker
- Caribbean Jazz Project
- Citrus Sun
- Stanley Clarke
- Richie Cole
- Joyce Cooling
- Paquito D'Rivera
- Stefán Dickerson
- George Duke
- Candy Dulfer
- Fourplay
- Tony Gable & 206
- Carlos Guedes
- Hiroshima
- Incognito
- Henry Johnson
- Ladysmith Black Mambazo
- Chuck Loeb
- Jeff Lorber
- Bobby Lyle
- Miriam Makeba
- Hugh Masekela
- Joe McBride
- Marion Meadows
- Oliver Mtukudzi
- Najee
- Andy Narell
- Maceo Parker
- Jaco Pastorius Big Band
- Roberto Perera
- Pieces of a Dream
- Doc Powell
- Sakésho
- Diane Schuur
- Eric Scortia
- Richard Smith
- Esperanza Spalding
- Spyro Gyra
- Mike Stern
- Nestor Torres
- Two Siberians
- Gerald Veasley
- Pamela Williams
- Victor Wooten
- Yellowjackets
- Zap Mama
- Joe Zawinul
- Alexander Zonjic
