= Dave Koz discography =

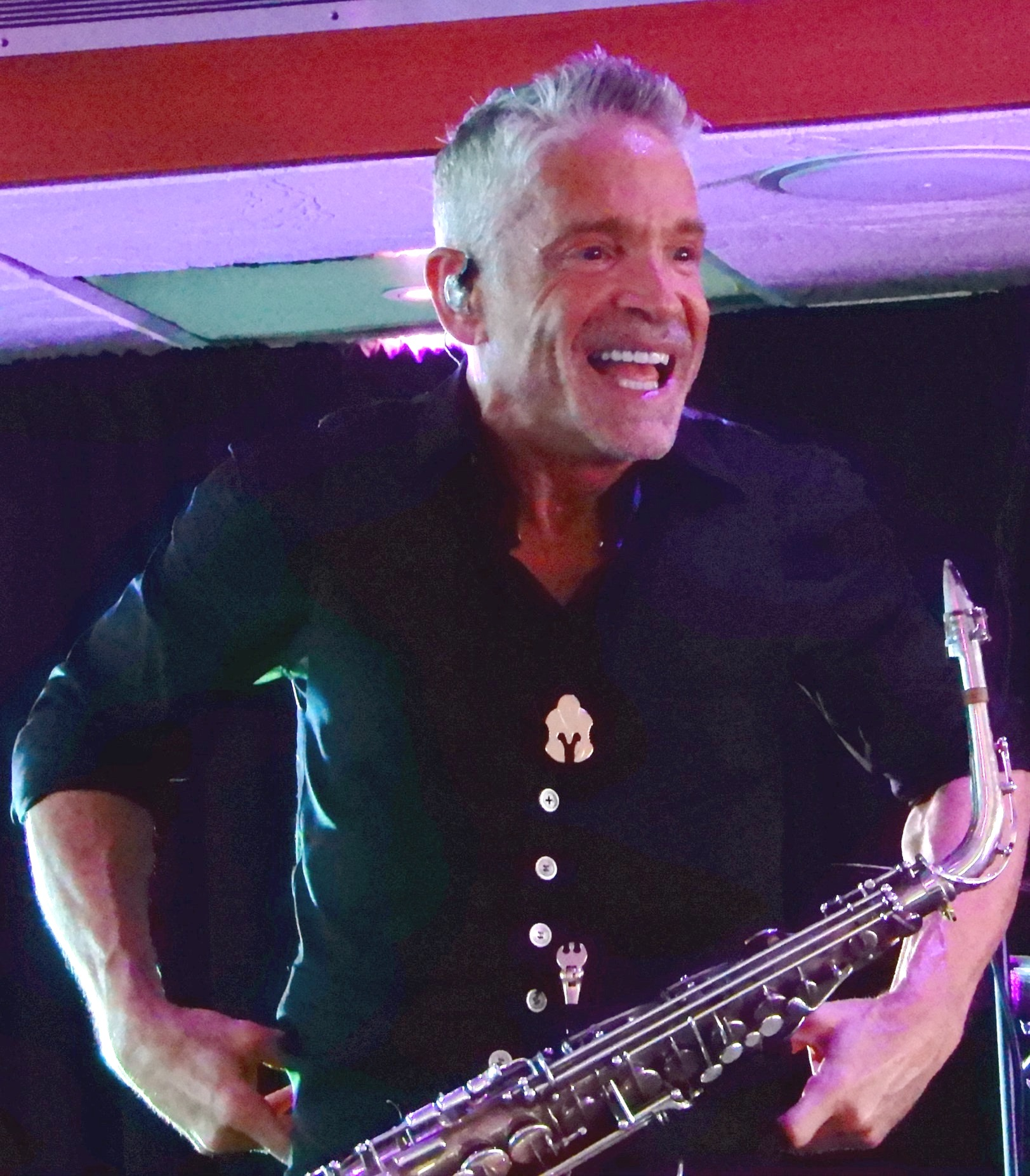
- Studio albums: 22
- Live albums: 7
- Compilation albums: 1
- Singles: 47
- Video albums: 1
- Featured artist: 19
- Collaboration albums: 3
- Other appearances: 6

This is the discography for American jazz saxophonist Dave Koz which consists of 19 studio albums, three collaboration album, four live albums, one compilation album, one video album, 67 singles (47 as lead artist and 19 as a featured artist), and six other appearances.

== Albums ==
=== Studio albums ===
==== Solo albums ====
List of albums, with selected chart positions
| Title | Album details | Peak chart position | | |
| Title | Album details | US | US Jazz | US Contemp Jazz |
|---|---|---|---|---|
| Dave Koz | Released: May 27, 1990 (NYC) September 25, 1990 (USA); Label: Capitol; Format: Cassette, CD | 128 | 48 | 4 |
| Lucky Man | Released: June 29, 1993; Label: Capitol; Format: Cassette, CD | 176 | 4 | 2 |
| Off the Beaten Path | Released: August 20, 1996; Label: Capitol; Format: Cassette, CD | 182 | 3 | 3 |
| December Makes Me Feel This Way | Released: September 23, 1997; Label: Capitol; Format: CD | — | 4 | 2 |
| The Dance (Note: The Dance also peaked at No. 67 on Billboard's R&B/Hip Hop Albums.) | Released: September 28, 1999; Capital; CD | 190 | 3 | 2 |
| A Smooth Jazz Christmas (Note: Smooth Jazz Christmas also peaked at No. 2 on Billboard's Holiday Albums.) | Released: September 25, 2001; Label: Capitol; Format: CD | 140 | 3 | 1 |
| Golden Slumbers: A Father's Lullaby | Released: September 24, 2002; Label: Artistry; Format: CD | — | — | — |
| Saxophonic | Released: October 7, 2003; Label: Capitol; Format: CD | 129 | 2 | 2 |
| Golden Slumbers: A Father's Love | Released: April 26, 2005; Label: Rendezvous; Format: CD | — | — | — |
| At the Movies | Released: January 30, 2007; Label: Capitol; Format: CD | 86 | 2 | 1 |
| Memories of a Winter's Night | Released: September 18, 2007; Label: Capitol; Format: CD | — | 7 | 1 |
| Hello Tomorrow | Released: October 9, 2010; Label: Concord; Format: CD, digital download | 104 | 1 | 1 |
| Ultimate Christmas | Released: October 11, 2011; Label: Concord; Format: Digital download | — | — | 1 |
| Dave Koz and Friends: Summer Horns | Released: May 7, 2013; Label: Concord; Format: Digital download | 84 | 2 | 1 |
| Rest | Released: September 23, 2014; Label: Concord; Format: Digital download, streaming | 184 | 2 | 1 |
| Dave Koz and Friends: 20th Anniversary Christmas | Released: September 29, 2017; Label: Concord; Format: Digital download, streaming | — | — | 1 |
| Dave Koz and Friends: Summer Horns II From A to Z | Released: June 22, 2018; Label: Concord; Format: Digital download, streaming | — | 2 | 1 |
| A New Day | Released: October 9, 2020; Label: Just Koz Entertainment; Format: Digital download, streaming | — | 21 | 2 |
| A Romantic Night In (The Love Songs Album) | Released: February 14, 2021; Label: Just Koz Entertainment; Format: Digital download, streaming | — | — | — |
| Dave Koz and Friends: Christmas Ballads (25th Anniversary Edition) | Released: September 23, 2022; Label: Just Koz Entertainment; Format: Digital download, streaming | — | — | — |
"—" denotes a release that did not chart.

=== Collaborations ===
List of albums, with selected chart positions
| Title | Album details | Peak chart position | | |
| Title | Album details | US | US Jazz | US Contemp Jazz |
|---|---|---|---|---|
| Collaborations: 25th Anniversary Collection | Released: July 31, 2015; Label: Concord; Format: Digital download, streaming | 187 | 1 | 1 |
| The Golden Hour (Cory Wong and Dave Koz) | Released: June 11, 2021; Label: Just Koz Entertainment; Format: Digital download, streaming | — | 16 | 5 |
| Just Us (Bob James and Dave Koz) | Released: March 7, 2025; Label: Just Koz Entertainment; Format: Digital download, streaming | | | |
"—" denotes a release that did not chart.

=== Live albums ===
| Title | Album details | Peak chart position | |
| Title | Album details | US Jazz | US Contemp Jazz |
|---|---|---|---|
| Dave Koz: Off the Beaten Path - Live in Trinidad | Released: November 18, 1997; Label: Capitol; Format: CD | — | — |
| iTunes Live from SoHo (EP) | Released: June 14, 2011; Label: iTunes; Format: Digital download | 15 | 8 |
| Live at the Blue Note Tokyo | Release: September 12, 2012; Label: Concord; Format: Digital download | — | 20 |
| Dave Koz Presents: Live from the Dave Koz Cruise | Released: June 20, 2019; Label: Just Koz; Format: Digital download, streaming | 8 | 3 |
"—" denotes a release that did not chart.

=== Compilations ===
List of albums, with selected chart positions
| Title | Album details | Peak chart position | | |
| Title | Album details | US | US Jazz | US Contemp Jazz |
|---|---|---|---|---|
| Greatest Hits | Released: November 6, 2008; Label: Capitol; Format: CD, digital download | 184 | 3 | 1 |
"—" denotes a release that did not chart.

=== Video albums ===
| Title | Album details |
|---|---|
| Dave Koz: Off the Beaten Path - Live in Trinidad | Released: August 27, 2002; Label: Capitol; Format: DVD |

== Singles ==
=== As lead artist ===
List of singles, with selected chart positions
| Title | Year | Peak chart position | | | | Album | Ref. |
| Title | Year | US Hot 100 | US AC | US Smooth Jazz | AUS | Album | Ref. |
|---|---|---|---|---|---|---|---|
| "Emily" | 1990 | — | — | — | | Dave Koz | |
| "Nothing But the Radio On" (featuring Joey Diggs) | 1990 | — | 20 | — | 98 | Dave Koz | |
| "Castle of Dreams" | 1991 | — | 13 | — | — | Dave Koz | |
| "You Make Me Smile" | 1993 | 111 | 20 | — | — | Lucky Man | (Note: "You Make Me Smile" also peaked at No. 15 on RPM's Adult Contemporary charts.) |
| "Faces of the Heart" (ABC Daytime's General Hospital Theme Song) | 1993 | — | — | — | — | Lucky Man | |
| "Silverlining" | 1993 | — | — | — | — | Lucky Man | |
| "Shakin' The Shack" | 1994 | — | — | — | — | Lucky Man | |
| "Lucky Man" (featuring Charles Pettigrew) | 1994 | — | — | — | — | Lucky Man | |
| "Together Again" | 1999 | — | — | — | — | The Dance | (Note: "Together Again" also peaked at No. 75 on RPM's Adult Contemporary charts.) |
| "Careless Whisper" (featuring Montell Jordan) | 2000 | — | — | 30 | — | The Dance | (Note: "Careless Whisper" featuring Montell Jordan also peaked at No. 105 on Billboard's US R&B charts.) (Note: "Careless Whisper" featuring Montell Jordan also peaked at No. 80 on RPM's Adult Contemporary charts.) |
| "Know You by Heart" | 2000 | — | — | 26 | — | The Dance | |
| "Love Changes Everything" (featuring Brian McKnight) | 2005 | — | 6 | — | — | Saxophonic | |
| "Somewhere" (featuring Anita Baker) | 2006 | — | — | — | — | At the Movies | |
| "The Summer Knows" | 2006 | — | — | — | — | At the Movies | |
| "The Pink Panther" | 2007 | — | — | 27 | — | At the Movies | |
| "It Might Be You (Instrumental)" (featuring Peter White) | 2007 | — | — | — | — | At the Movies | |
| "Life in the Fast Lane" | 2008 | — | — | 1 | — | Greatest Hits | |
| "White Christmas" | 2008 | — | — | 14 | — | Non-album single | |
| "Bada Bing" (featuring Jeff Golub) | 2009 | — | — | 2 | — | Greatest Hits | |
| "And Then I Knew" | 2010 | — | — | 13 | — | Greatest Hits | |
| "Silent Night" | 2010 | — | — | — | — | Non-album single | |
| "Put The Top Down" (featuring Lee Ritenour) | 2010 | — | — | 1 | — | Hello Tomorrow | |
| "This Guy's in Love with You" (featuring Herb Alpert) | 2010 | — | — | — | — | Hello Tomorrow | (Note: "This Guy's in Love with You" also peaked at No. 39 on Billboard's Dance Club Songs.) |
| "Starting Over Again" (with Dana Glover) | 2011 | — | — | 7 | — | Hello Tomorrow | |
| "Anything's Possible" | 2011 | — | — | 1 | — | Hello Tomorrow | |
| "I Got You (I Feel Good)" (with Gerald Albright, Mindi Abair, and Richard Elliot) | 2013 | — | — | 3 | — | Dave Koz and Friends - Summer Horns | |
| Hot Fun in the Summertime (with Gerald Albright, Mindi Abair, and Richard Elliot) | 2014 | — | — | 6 | — | Dave Koz and Friends - Summer Horns | |
| "Let It Snow! Let It Snow! Let It Snow!" (featuring Kenny G) | 2014 | — | 11 | — | — | Dave Koz & Friends: The 25th of December | |
| "(Your Love Keeps Lifting Me) Higher and Higher" (featuring Kenny Lattimore and Rick Braun) | 2015 | — | — | 6 | — | Collaborations: 25th Anniversary Collection | |
| "The Jump (Rap Version)" (featuring Dominque Cohill) | 2017 | — | — | — | — | Non-album singles | |
| "If Not You" | 2018 | — | — | — | — | Non-album singles | |
| "Drive" | 2018 | — | — | — | — | Non-album singles | |
| "Paris Nocturne" | 2018 | — | — | — | — | Non-album singles | |
| "Barefoot" | 2018 | — | — | — | — | Non-album singles | |
| "Deep Dive" | 2019 | — | — | — | — | Non-album singles | |
| "Smooth Talk" | 2019 | — | — | — | — | Non-album singles | |
| "Before I Let Go" (with Gerald Albright, Rick Braun, Richard Elliot, Aubrey Logan) | 2019 | — | — | 1 | — | Dave Koz and Friends: Summer Horns II From A to Z | |
| "Summertime in NYC" (featuring Brian McKnight) | 2020 | — | — | 1 | — | A New Day | |
| "The Closer We Get" | 2020 | — | — | 1 | — | A New Day | |
| "Yesterday" | 2020 | — | — | — | — | A New Day | |
| "Side by Side" (featuring Dave Sanborn) | 2020 | — | — | 1 | — | A New Day | |
| "Long Goodbyes" (featuring Bob James) | 2020 | — | — | 15 | — | A New Day | |
| "Dr. Norm" (featuring Paul Jackson Jr.) | 2020 | — | — | 1 | — | A New Day | |
| "Today" (with Cory Wong) | 2021 | — | — | — | — | The Golden Hour | |
| "Getaway Car" (with Cory Wong) | 2021 | — | — | — | — | The Golden Hour | |
| "Summertime in NYC" (Instrumental Mix) | 2022 | — | — | — | — | Non-album single | |
| "Happy Xmas (War Is Over) / Imagine" (featuring Rebecca Jade) | 2022 | — | — | — | — | Dave Koz & Friends: Christmas Ballads (25th Anniversary Edition) | |
| "New Hope" (Radio Edit) (with Bob James) | 2025 | — | — | — | — | Non-album single | |
| "—" denotes a release that did not chart. | 2025 | | | | | | |

=== As featured artist ===
List of singles, with selected chart positions
| Title | Year | Peak chart position | | Album | Ref. |
| Title | Year | US AC | US Smooth Jazz | Album | Ref. |
|---|---|---|---|---|---|
| "White Christmas" (Kelly Sweet featuring Dave Koz) | 2007 | 22 | — | Sweet Christmas | |
| "Ritmo De Otono" (Bernie Williams featuring Dave Koz) | 2010 | — | 1 | Moving Forward | |
| "Let It Snow! Let It Snow! Let It Snow!" (Rod Stewart featuring Dave Koz) | 2012 | 1 | — | Merry Christmas, Baby | (Note: The Rod Stewart and Dave Koz version of "Let It Snow! Let It Snow! Let It Snow!" also peaked at No. 14 on the Canada Adult Contemporary charts.) |
| "Can You Hear Me" (Patrick Bradley featuring Dave Koz) | 2014 | — | 25 | Can You Hear Me | |
| "Game of Thrones Theme" (Scott Bradlee featuring Dave Koz) | 2014 | — | — | Non-album single | |
| "Harmony Park" (Nate Harasim featuring Dave Koz) | 2015 | — | 19 | #Shadesofnate | |
| "When I Hear Your Name" (Brian Simpson featuring Dave Koz) | 2016 | — | 12 | Out of a Dream | |
| "Rosy Cheeks" (Peet Project featuring Dave Koz) | 2017 | — | 18 | The Bad Boys of Budapest | |
| "Friends at Sea" (Cory Wong with Dave Koz) | 2018 | — | — | The Koz Nod | (Note: Koz Nod is the name of a two-song single.) |
| "The Optimist" (Cory Wong with Dave Koz) | 2018 | — | — | The Koz Nod | (Note: Koz Nod is the name of a two-song single.) |
| "Just Dance" (Adam Hawley featuring Dave Koz) | 2019 | — | 3 | Double Vision | |
| "It's All Love" (Chris "Big Dog" Davis featuring Dave Koz) | 2020 | — | 26 | Focus | |
| "Heat" (Ilya Serov featuring Dave Koz) | 2021 | — | 13 | Non-album single | |
| "B Positive" (Rob Tardik featuring Dave Koz) | 2021 | — | — | Diversity, Vol. 2: Contemporary Funky Jazz | |
| "Walking on Sunshine" (Brian Bromberg featuring Dave Koz) | 2021 | — | — | A Little Driving Music | |
| "Sweet Reunion" (Tommy Davidson featuring Dave Koz) | 2022 | — | — | Non-album singles | |
| "Because I Love You" (Chris Walker featuring Dave Koz) | 2022 | — | — | Non-album singles | |
| "Kave Doz" (Sam Greenfield featuring Dave Koz) | 2022 | — | — | Non-album singles | |
| "Natalie Explain (Alan Chang featuring Dave Koz) | 2023 | — | — | Non-album singles | |
| "Good Morning" (Eric Hirshberg featuring Dave Koz) | 2023 | — | — | Second Hand Smoke | |
"—" denotes a release that did not chart.

== Other appearances ==
List of albums, with selected chart positions
| Title | Year | Credited artists | Peak chart position | | Album | Ref |
| Title | Year | Credited artists | US Hot 100 | US Contemp Jazz | Album | Ref |
|---|---|---|---|---|---|---|
| "Shakin' the Shack" (from the album Lucky Man) | 2007 | Dave Koz | 1 | 1 | The Weather Channel Presents: The Best of Smooth Jazz | |
| "The Tears of Goodbye" | 2008 | Taro Gold | — | — | The Diamond You | |
| "Restoration" | 2020 | Cory Wong (featuring Dave Koz) | — | — | Elevator Music for an Elevated Mood | |
| "Watercolors" | 2020 | Cory Wong (featuring Dave Koz) | — | — | Elevator Music for an Elevated Mood | |
| "Super Natural" | 2022 | Ben Rector (featuring Dave Koz) | — | — | The Joy of Music | |
| "You've Got a Friend" | 2025 | Ryan La Valette (featuring Dave Koz) | — | — | Fresh | |
"—" denotes a release that did not chart.
