= Off the Beaten Path =

Off the Beaten Path may refer to:

- Off the Beaten Path (Dave Koz album), 1996
- Off the Beaten Path (Justin Moore album), 2013
- Off the Beaten Path, a 2018 album by the Ozark Mountain Daredevils

== See also ==
- Off the Beaten Track
