= Memories of a Winter's Night =

Compilation album by Dave Koz
- Released: September 18, 2007
- Recorded: 1997–2007
- Genre: Smooth jazz, Christmas
- Length: 45:17
- Label: Capitol
- Producer: Dave Koz, Brian Culbertson, Thom Panunzio

Dave Koz chronology
At the Movies (2007)	Memories of a Winter's Night (2007)	Greatest Hits (2008)

Professional ratings
Review scores
Source	Rating
Allmusic	4.5/5 stars

Memories of a Winter's Night is the compilation album by saxophone player Dave Koz. Koz's third holiday album contains tracks from previous holiday albums and new tunes. The album was released by Capitol Records on September 18, 2007.

== Track listing ==
No.	Title	Writer(s)	Length
1.	"Deck the Halls"	Public Domain	3:41
2.	"Santa Claus Is Coming to Town" (from December Makes Me Feel This Way, 1997)	J. Fred Coots, Haven Gillespie	2:54
3.	"Have Yourself a Merry Little Christmas"	Ralph Blane, Hugh Martin	4:19
4.	"White Christmas" (featuring Kelly Sweet)	Irving Berlin	3:17
5.	"Winter Wonderland"	Felix Bernard, Richard B. Smith	4:29
6.	"Hark! The Herald Angels Sing"	Felix Mendelssohn, Charles Wesley	3:52
7.	"Please Come Home for Christmas" (featuring Kimberley Locke)	Charles Brown, Gene Redd	3:45
8.	"Memories of a Winter's Night (A Song for Hanukkah)"	Dave Koz	3:31
9.	"Little Drummer Boy" (from A Smooth Jazz Christmas, 2001)	Katherine K. Davis, Henry Onorati, Harry Simeone	4:23
10.	"Silver Bells" (from December Makes Me Feel This Way, 1997)	Jay Livingston, Ray Evans	3:52
11.	"Boogie Woogie Santa Claus" (from A Smooth Jazz Christmas, 2001)	Brenda Russell	3:19
12.	"O Tannenbaum" (from December Makes Me Feel This Way, 1997)	Public Domain	3:49

== Personnel ==
- Dave Koz - Saxophones, Piano, Keyboards
- Alex Al - Bass
- David Benoit - Piano
- Rick Braun - Trumpet
- Gerry Brown - Drums
- Bridgette Bryant - Background Vocal
- Brian Culbertson - Piano, Keyboards, Percussion, Trombone
- Jim Culbertson - Trumpet
- Paul Jackson Jr. - Guitar
- Brian Kilgore - Percussion
- Jeff Koz - Nylon String Guitar
- Nick Lane - Trombone
- Kimberley Locke - Vocal
- Tony Maiden - Guitar, Vocal
- Eddie Miller - Wurlitzer, B-3 Organ
- Ester Nicholson - Background Vocal
- Ray Parker Jr. - Guitar
- Phil Parlapiano - Keyboards, Guitar
- Fernando Perdomo - Bass
- Doug Pettibone - Guitars
- David Piltch - Acoustic Bass
- Brenda Russell - Vocal
- Bill Sharpe - Bass
- Sandy Simmons - Background Vocal
- Brian Simpson - Keyboards, Piano
- Kelly Sweet - Vocal
- Michael Thompson - Guitar
- Stevo Théard - Drums
- Bruce Watson - Guitars
- Gigi Worth - Background Vocal
- Donn Wyatt - Piano, Keyboards

== Charts ==
Chart (2007)	Peak position
Billboard Top Jazz Albums	7
