= You Make Me Smile =

You Make Me Smile may refer to:

- "You Make Me Smile" (song), a 1992 song by Dave Koz
- You Make Me Smile (album), a 1986 album by Art Farmer's Quintet, or the title song
