= Hello Tomorrow (disambiguation) =

Hello Tomorrow! is an American television series.

Hello Tomorrow may also refer to:

- "Hello Tomorrow" (advertisement), a 2005 television commercial
  - "Hello Tomorrow", a song by Karen O featured in the commercial
- Hello Tomorrow (album), a 2010 album by Dave Koz
- "Hello Tomorrow", a song by Zebrahead from MFZB
- "Hello Tomorrow", the brand tagline used by Emirates from 2012 to 2018.
