= Smooth Christmas =

Smooth Christmas may refer to:

- Smooth Christmas, a UK radio station dedicated to Christmas music, first launched in 2011
- A Smooth Jazz Christmas, a 2001 album by saxophone player Dave Koz
