= Emily (Dave Koz song) =

Single by Dave Koz

from the album Dave Koz
- Released: March 1990
- Recorded: 1989
- Genre: Smooth jazz
- Length: 5:30 (Album Edit)
- Label: Capitol
- Songwriter(s): Bobby Caldwell, Dave Koz, Jeff Lorber

Dave Koz singles chronology
"Castle of Dreams" (1990)	"Emily" (1990)	"You Make Me Smile" (1993)

"Emily" is the debut single by American smooth jazz saxophonist Dave Koz, from his self-titled debut album released in 1990. The album proved to be one of the first to spawn hit singles in the genre smooth jazz. The song was written for his then newborn niece.

== Track listings and appearances ==
The song has appeared on several albums apart from Dave Koz, notably in Pure Moods and Greatest Hits.

CD-maxi

No.	Title	Length
1.	"Emily" (Album Edit)	5.30
