= Stars (Mindi Abair album) =

Studio album by Mindi Abair
- Released: May 6, 2008
- Genre: Jazz
- Length: 44:21
- Label: Peak Records
- Producer: Matthew Hager

Mindi Abair chronology
Life Less Ordinary (2007)	Stars (2008)	In Hi-Fi Stereo (2010)

Professional ratings
Review scores
Source	Rating
AllMusic	4/5 stars

Stars is Mindi Abair's fifth album. It was released on May 6, 2008, by Peak Records. The album peaked at No. 4 on the Billboard Contemporary Jazz chart, and No. 7 on the Jazz albums chart. Two songs peaked on Billboard's Smooth Jazz Airplay chart, "Smile" at No. 9 and "Out of the Blue" at No. 16.

== Critical reception ==
Jonathan Widran of AllMusic calls the album, "one of 2008's most popular and dynamic urban contemporary jazz releases."

Brian Soergel of JazzTimes writes, "Abair clearly has a new market in sight with Stars" and "Her voice certainly holds up, with its earnest wistfulness carrying appealingly autobiographical songs about love and longing."

== Track listing ==
All songs written by Mindi Abair and Matthew Hager, except where noted.

No.	Title	Writer(s)	Length
1.	"Smile"		4:25
2.	"On and On"		4:15
3.	"Out of the Blue"		4:11
4.	"Stars"		3:58
5.	"F.L.A. Swing"	Abair, Hager, John Taylor	4:31
6.	"I Wonder"		3:43
7.	"Gingerbread Man"	Abair, Tyrone Stevens	3:40
8.	"Change"	Abair, Stevens	4:20
9.	"Mojo"		3:13
10.	"Here for You"		4:12
11.	"Gonna Be Alright"		3:53
Total length:			44:21

== Musicians ==
- Mindi Abair – vocals (1–6, 8, 10), acoustic piano (1), alto saxophone (1, 2, 3, 5, 9, 11), soprano saxophone (2, 4, 6, 7, 8, 10, 11), flute (2), keyboards (6, 7), percussion (8), vocal arrangements (10), all saxophones (11)
- Ricky Peterson – organ (2, 6, 7, 8, 10, 11), acoustic piano (3, 6, 8, 10, 11), keyboards (7), Wurlitzer electric piano (7)
- Jason Steele – string synthesizer (2)
- Matthew Hager – electric guitars (1, 3, 4, 8, 9, 10), acoustic guitar (1, 4, 6), bass (1–6, 9, 10), drum programming (1–4, 6–9), keyboards (2, 4, 5, 6), acoustic piano (2, 4), string arrangements (2), tambourine (3, 9), backing vocals (4), percussion (5, 7), sound effects (5)
- Dwight Sills – electric guitars (2, 4, 7, 8, 10, 11), guitar solo (4), acoustic guitar (8)
- John Taylor – acoustic guitar (5)
- Shawn Davis – bass (7, 8)
- Abe Laboriel Jr. – drums (2, 4, 5, 8, 9, 11), tambourine (4, 8, 11)
- Ryan Dankanich – baritone saxophone (2, 6, 8)
- Steve Tirpak – trombone (2, 6, 8), trumpet (2, 6, 8), horn arrangements (2, 6, 8)
- Richard Dodd – cello (2, 4)
- Charlean Carmon – backing vocals (2, 4, 6, 7, 8, 10),
- DeeDee Foster – backing vocals (2, 4, 6, 7, 8, 10),
- Kenya Hathaway – backing vocals (2, 4, 6, 7, 8, 10)

== Production ==
- Andi Howard – executive producer
- Mark Wexler – executive producer
- Matthew Hager – producer, recording
- Steve Sykes – recording, mixing
- Josh Blanchard – assistant engineer
- Brendan Dekora – assistant engineer
- Stephen Marcussen – mastering
- Valerie Ince – label coordinator
- Patty Palazzo – art direction
- Reisig & Taylor Photography – photography

Track information and credits adapted from Discogs and AllMusic, then verified from the album's liner notes.

== Charts ==
Chart (2003)	Peak position
Contemporary Jazz (Billboard)	4
US Top Jazz Albums (Billboard)	7

=== Singles ===
Title	Date	Chart	Peak position
"Smile"	May 16, 2008	Smooth Jazz Airplay	9
"Out of the Blue"	February 20, 2009	Smooth Jazz Airplay	16
"Stars"	August 23, 2008	Billboard Adult Contemporary	29
