= Testimony (Dana Glover album) =

Studio album by Dana Glover
- Released: October 15, 2002
- Label: DreamWorks
- Producer: Matthew Wilder

Testimony is the only studio album by singer-songwriter Dana Glover. Released in October 2002, the album reached No. 43 on the UK albums chart and produced two singles that both cracked the top 30 on ranking charts. "Thinking Over" reached No. 17 on the Billboard Adult Contemporary chart and No. 22 on the Billboard Adult Top 40 chart, while "Rain" reached No. 30 on the Adult Top 40 chart.

== Track listing ==
No.	Title	Length
1.	"Rain"	4:30
2.	"Thinking Over"	5:05
3.	"Almost Had It All"	4:38
4.	"Cherish"	4:21
5.	"A Reason"	4:16
6.	"Maybe"	4:02
7.	"Make It Real"	3:59
8.	"River Of Love"	4:43
9.	"Falling Into Love"	4:44
10.	"The Way (Radio Song)"	4:08
11.	"Testimony"	5:04
