= Mindi Abair =

American jazz saxophonist (born 1969)

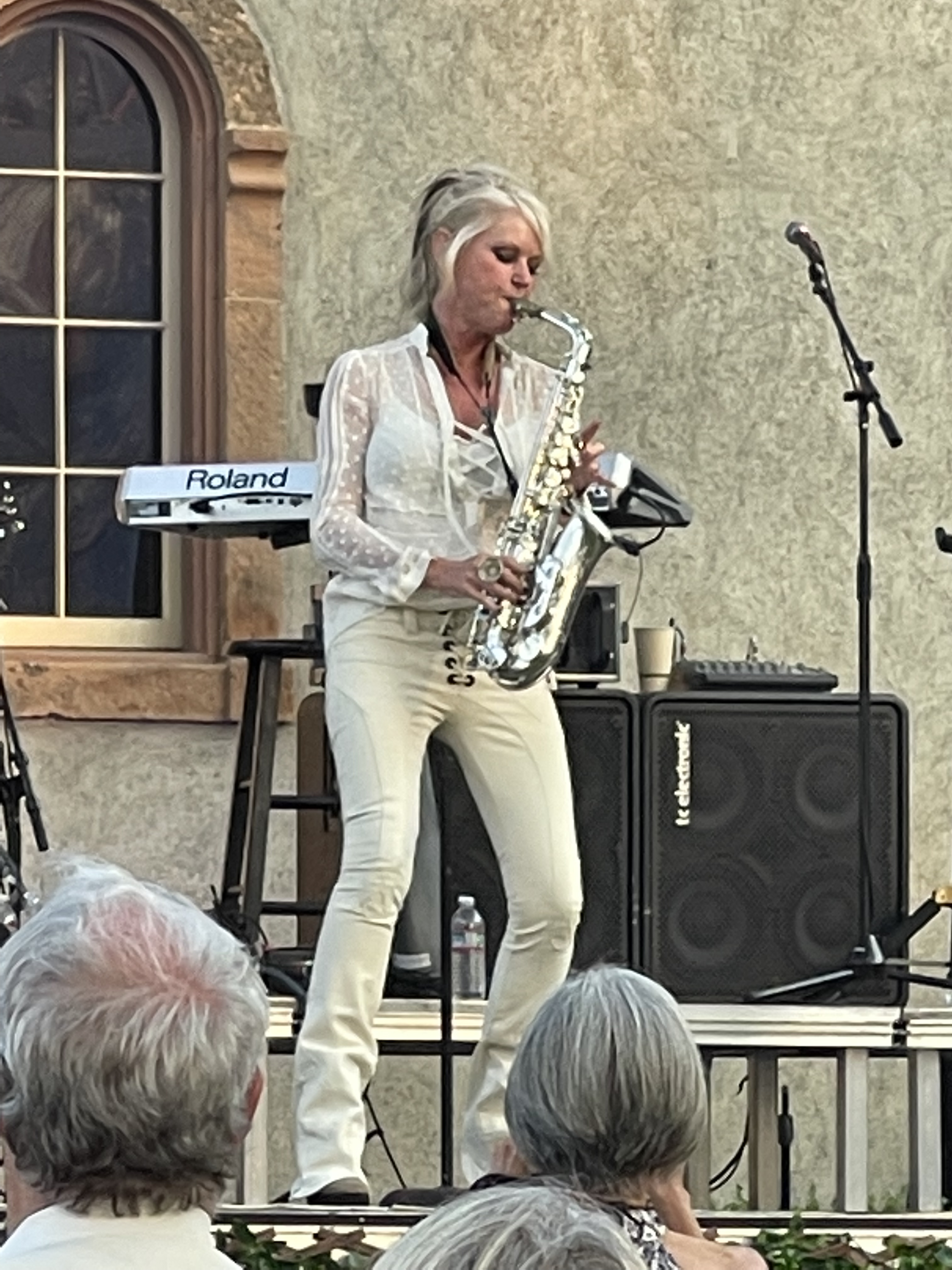
- Abair performing in St. Helena, California in August 2021.

Background information
- Born: May 23, 1969 (age 57); St. Petersburg, Florida, U.S.
- Genres: Rock, soul, pop, Contemporary jazz, smooth jazz
- Occupations: Musician, composer, bandleader, author
- Instruments: Vocals, saxophone, keyboards
- Years active: 1991–present Married
- Labels: GRP, Verve, Artistry, Peak, Heads Up, Concord
- Website: mindiabair.com

Mindi Abair (/ˈeɪbɛər/ AY-bair; born May 23, 1969) is an American saxophonist, vocalist, and author.

Her solo career has produced ten No. 1 radio singles, two No. 1 Billboard Jazz CDs, and four more solo CDs that have landed No. 5 and above on the Billboard Contemporary Jazz Charts. She was the featured saxophonist for the 2011 and 2012 seasons of American Idol, and performed with the rock band Aerosmith.

== Early life ==
She acted as drum major of her high school marching band in her junior and senior years at Northside Christian School in St. Petersburg. As a senior in high school, she won the first chair alto saxophone for the Florida All-State Jazz Band. Abair spent her first year of college on a full scholarship at the University of North Florida, a jazz program started by Rich Matteson. She transferred to Berklee College of Music in Boston, Massachusetts, attending on a scholarship and studying saxophone with Joe Viola and George Garzone. Abair graduated magna cum laude in 1991 with a degree in Woodwind Performance. She formed her first band in college.

== Career ==
=== Performances and releases ===
In 1991, after college, Abair moved to Los Angeles, California, where she began booking her band into clubs, coffee shops and hotels. She played solo on the street at 3rd Street Promenade in Santa Monica, California and garnered the attention of jazz keyboardist Bobby Lyle, who hired her to record on his Power of Touch CD and tour with him. Her touring opportunities expanded over the next decade, as she toured as a saxophonist/singer and keyboardist with Adam Sandler, John Tesh, Jonathan Butler, Teena Marie, Rick Braun as well. Abair was featured on saxophone in the Go West video "Tell Me". In 1996, she appeared on Adam Sandler's HBO Special and recorded on his platinum CD What's Your Name? playing the saxophone solo on "The Lonesome Kicker" and singing on various tracks.

In 1999, Abair joined the Backstreet Boys for their Millennium World Tour, and spent the next year and a half as their saxophonist, keyboardist and percussionist. She assembled Mandy Moore's first band and acted as musical director, keyboardist, background singer and percussionist for many of Moore's first television appearances and shows.

When not touring, Abair released her first complete solo album, Always and Never the Same, an all-vocal pop record, independently. Abair performed in local Los Angeles rock clubs to promote the record, in addition to her touring with the Backstreet Boys.

In 2003, Abair signed to Verve Records and released the album It Just Happens That Way, which peaked at No. 7 on the Billboard Contemporary Jazz Chart. 2004's "I Can't Wait for Christmas," the title track to her Christmas album of the same name, became a regional hit, particularly in Buffalo, New York, where both incarnations of WTSS have included the record among their Christmas music playlists.

In 2004, Abair released Come As You Are, which peaked at No. 9 on the Billboard Contemporary Jazz charts. She followed that with Life Less Ordinary in 2006, which peaked at No. 1 on the Billboard Contemporary Jazz Chart and remained in the top 20 for 45 weeks. Her songs "True Blue" and "Bloom" hit No. 1 on R&R.

Abair signed to Concord Records in 2007 and released her genre breaking Stars in 2008 which peaked at No. 4 on the Billboard Contemporary Jazz Chart. Her single "Stars" (co-written and produced by Matthew Hager) charted at No. 29 Adult Contemporary R&R simultaneously with her single "Smile" which reached No. 1 on the R&R jazz airplay charts. She released "Hi-Fi Stereo" in 2010 which peaked at No. 6 on the Billboard Jazz Albums chart. The album spawned the No. 1 hit "Be Beautiful" written by David Ryan Harris.

The album Summer Horns, a collaboration with Dave Koz, Gerald Albright, and Richard Elliot, was nominated for Best Pop Instrumental Album at the 2013 Grammy Awards.

On May 27, 2014, Abair released Wild Heart on Concord Records imprint, Heads Up International. The record debuted at No. 1 on the Billboard Jazz chart and No. 152 on the Billboard Top 200. The record, which included collaborations with the late Gregg Allman, Joe Perry and Trombone Shorty, was nominated for Best Contemporary Instrumental Album in the 2015 Grammy Awards.

Abair received the Mad Skills Award at the third annual She Rocks at NAMM Show on January 24, 2015. Held in Anaheim, California, the event was founded by the Women's International Music Network.

In 2015, after working with Randy Jacobs (founder of The Boneshakers) on the tour for Wild Heart, he and Abair decided to form Mindi Abair and The Boneshakers, which includes Mindi Abair (saxophone, vocals), Randy Jacobs (guitar, vocals), Sweet Pea Atkinson (vocals), Rodney Lee (keyboards), Derek Frank (bass, vocals), and Third Richardson (drums, vocals). In late 2015, they released a live album Mindi Abair and The Boneshakers Live in Seattle via Pledge Music and HeadsUp, which featured a performance from Seattle's Dimitriou's Jazz Alley in February 2015. In summer 2017, the group announced their first studio project via Randy Jacobs' website. Recorded over five days at EastWest Studios with producer Kevin Shirley, The EastWest Sessions, included 11 blues and rock tracks, was released on September 15, 2017. Joe Bonamassa and Fantastic Negrito were featured guests. The album debuted at No. 3 on the Billboard Blues Albums Chart on the week of October 7, 2017.

"Pretty Good for a Girl," a tongue-in-cheek track co-written by Abair and Jacobs for the album, inspired Abair to launch the web platform PrettyGoodForAGirl.net. The goal of the website is to celebrate exceptional women and turn "pretty good for a girl" into a phrase of empowerment.

In October 2018, Mindi Abair and The Boneshakers released their first blues rock holiday album, All I Got For Christmas Is The Blues. It debuted at number 7 on the Billboard Blues Albums Chart, number 1 on the RMR Holiday Album and Song Chart and number 13 on Sirius XM Bluesville. It featured four original songs including "All I Got For Christmas Is The Blues" and five holiday classics including "Merry Christmas Baby" and "The Christmas Song".

In June 2019, Abair and The Boneshakers released No Good Deed. It debuted at number 3 in the Billboard Blues Albums Chart.

=== Radio host ===
In 2007, Abair took over the nationally syndicated radio program Chill with Chris Botti which he had hosted for two years. The name changed to "Chill With Mindi Abair," which she hosted from 2007 to 2015. The focus of the program was chill out music.

=== Television appearances ===
Abair featured on the 2011 American Idol season as a soloist with Paul McDonald and Casey Abrams and playing behind contestants Jacob Lusk and Haley Reinhart. Steven Tyler remarked to McDonald after her debut on the show "Forget you, who's your sax player?" Abair was featured on the 2012 American Idol season, performing with Phillip Phillips and Joshua Ledet. Abair appeared with Phillips six times as a featured saxophonist, performing the songs "U Got It Bad" originally by Usher, "Disease" originally by Matchbox Twenty, "Have You Ever Seen the Rain?" originally by Creedence Clearwater Revival, "Movin' Out" originally by Billy Joel, "In The Midnight Hour" originally by Wilson Pickett and "Give A Little More" originally by Maroon 5. She was also part of the selected brass section for Ledet's performance of "It's a Man's Man's Man's World" originally by James Brown. Tyler was so impressed with Abair that he invited her to join Aerosmith on the summer leg of their 2012 world tour playing sax and singing backing vocals.

She filled in as the saxophonist with the CBS Orchestra on the Late Show with David Letterman on April 3 and 4, 2012. She sat in with the band again on July 29, 2014, and she also performed her original songs "Wild Heart" and "Train."

Abair has also appeared on The Tavis Smiley Show and more than once on The Tonight Show Starring Jimmy Fallon.

== Other ventures ==
=== National Academy of Recording Arts And Sciences ===
In 2009, Abair was elected as a Governor on the Board of the Los Angeles Chapter of the National Academy of Recording Arts and Sciences, serving for three years until 2012, when she was elected as Secretary. She spent one year serving as Secretary. In 2013, Abair was elected to a two-year term as the President of the Los Angeles Chapter, taking over the position from the previous president, MC Lyte. Mindi was elected to a two-year term as National Trustee of the Recording Academy in 2015, serving for two years until 2017.

== Discography ==
=== Albums ===
Year	Album	Peak chart positions								Label
Year	Album	US 200	US Top Sales	US Jazz	US Con. Jazz	US Top Cur	US Ind	US Holi	US Blues	Label
1999	Mindi Abair	—	—	—	—	—	—	—	—	—N/a
2000	Always and Never the Same	—	—	—	—	—	—	—	—	—N/a
2003	It Just Happens That Way	—	—	7	3	—	—	—	—	GRP
2004	Come As You Are	—	—	9	5	—	—	—	—	GRP
2006	Life Less Ordinary	—	—	2	1	—	—	—	—	GRP
2007	Peter White Christmas (Peter White with Rick Braun and Mindi Abair)	—	—	12	5	—	—	19	—	Artistry
2008	Stars	—	—	7	4	—	—	—	—	Peak
2010	In Hi-Fi Stereo	—	—	6	2	—	—	—	—	Heads Up
2013	Dave Koz and Friends: Summer Horns (Dave Koz featuring Gerald Albright, Mindi Abair and Richard Elliot)	84	84	2	1	76	—	—	—	Concord
2014	Wild Heart	—	—	1	1	152	—	—	—	Heads Up
2015	Live in Seattle (Mindi Abair and the Boneshakers)	—	—	6	2	—	—	—	—	Heads Up
2015	Peter White Christmas – Live! (Peter White with Rick Braun and Mindi Abair)	—	—	—	—	—	—	—	—	—N/a
2017	The EastWest Sessions (Mindi Abair and the Boneshakers)	—	—	—	—	—	—	—	3	Pretty Good for a Girl
2018	All I Got for Christmas Is the Blues (Mindi Abair and the Boneshakers)	—	—	—	—	—	—	—	7	Pretty Good for a Girl
2019	No Good Deed (Mindi Abair and the Boneshakers)	—	—	—	—	—	48	—	3	Pretty Good for a Girl
2021	The Best of Mindi Abair	—	—	11	3	—	—	—	—	Pretty Good for a Girl
2022	Forever	—	—	19	5	—	—	—	—	Pretty Good for a Girl
2024	I Can't Wait for Christmas (Mindi Abair with Lindsey Webster and Marcus Anderson)	—	—	—	—	—	—	—	—	Pretty Good for a Girl
2025	Based on a True Story	—	—	—	—	—	—	—	—	Pretty Good for a Girl
"—" denotes a recording that did not chart.

=== Singles ===
Year	Title	Peak chart positions			Album
Year	Title	Adult Cont.	Smooth Jazz Airplay	JPN Hot	Album
2005	"Make a Wish"	—	21	—	Come As You Are
2006	"Happy Christmas" – (charted in Japan in 2017)	—	18	90	Non-album single
2006	"True Blue"	—	2	—	Life Less Ordinary
2006	"Bloom"	—	1	—	Life Less Ordinary
2008	"Smile"	—	9	—	Stars
2008	"Out of the Blue"	—	16	—	Stars
2008	"Stars"	29	—	—	Stars
2009	"The Little Drummer Boy" (Peter White with Rick Braun and Mindi Abair)	—	28	—	Peter White Christmas
2010	"Be Beautiful"	—	1	—	In Hi-Fi Stereo
2010	"Get Right"	—	16	—	In Hi-Fi Stereo
2011	"Any Way You Wanna"	—	30	—	In Hi-Fi Stereo
2013	"Got to Get You into My Life" (Dave Koz featuring Gerald Albright, Mindi Abair and Richard Elliot)	—	1	—	Dave Koz and Friends: Summer Horns
2013	"I Got You (I Feel Good)" (Dave Koz featuring Gerald Albright, Mindi Abair and Richard Elliot)	—	3	—	Dave Koz and Friends: Summer Horns
2014	"Hot Fun in the Summertime" (Dave Koz featuring Gerald Albright, Mindi Abair and Richard Elliot)	—	6	—	Dave Koz and Friends: Summer Horns
2014	"Haute Sauce"	—	3	—	Wild Heart
2014	"Amazing Game" (Mindi Abair featuring Trombone Shorty)	—	15	—	Wild Heart
2015	"Wild Heart"	—	18	—	Wild Heart
2015	"Gone" (Mindi Abair and the Boneshakers)	—	7	—	Live in Seattle
2020	"Forever"	—	3	—	Forever
2021	"April"	—	14	—	Forever
2022	"Nothing Ever Hurt Like You"	—	1	—	Forever
2023	"Fly"	—	11	—	Non-album single
2025	"Oooh-Aah (Catalina)"	—	1	—	Based on a True Story
2025	"Nouveau Soul"	—	6	—	Based on a True Story
2026	"Falling in Love" (Mindi Abair featuring Delisha Thomas)	—	2	—	Based on a True Story
2026	"The Way That You Love Me" (Mindi Abair featuring Delisha Thomas)	—	21	—	Based on a True Story
"—" denotes a recording that did not chart.

== Appearances ==
=== Guest appearances ===
- Bobby Lyle – Power of Touch (1997)
- Adam Sandler – What's Your Name? (1997)
- Henry Phillips – Number 2 (1999)
- Jeff Golub – Soul Sessions (2003)
- Michael Feinstein – Only One Life: The Songs Of Jimmy Webb (2003)
- Keb' Mo' – Peace...Back by Popular Demand (2004)
- Peach – Real Thing (2004)
- Ellis Hall – Straight Ahead (2004)
- Alan Hewitt Project – Noche de Pasion (2004)
- Peter White – Confidential (2004)
- Daniel Benzali – Benzali (2005)
- Loren Gold – Keys (2005)
- Val Watson – Live at the Funk Lounge (2005)
- Randy Jacobs – From Me To You (2005)
- Russ Kunkel/Chateau Beach – Rivage (2008)
- The Ides of March – Still 19 (2010)
- Greg Manning – The Calling (2010)
- Jim Peterik's Lifeforce – Forces at Play ( 2011)
- Brite Futures – Dark Past (2011)
- Mocean Worker – Candygram for Mowo! (2011)
- Keb' Mo' – The Reflection (2011)
- Groove Kid Nation – The Wheels on the Bus (2011)
- Terry Wollman – A Joyful Noise (2012)
- Chris Mann – Home For Christmas: The Chris Mann Christmas Special (2013)
- Chris Mann – Chris Mann in Concert: A Mann For All Seasons (2013)
- Randy Jacobs – Rhythm and the Beat (2013)
- Jeff Golub with Brian Auger – Train Keeps A-Rolling (2013)
- David Pack – Napa Crossroads (2014)
- Bobby Rush & Blinddog Smokin' – Decisions (2014)
- Sweet Pea Atkinson – Get What You Deserve (2017)

=== Soundtrack appearances ===
- License to Wed – "Every Time" (2007) track 9

=== Compilation album appearances ===
- A Twist of Motown (2003)
- WSJT 94.1 Smooth Jazz, Vol. 6 (2003)
- KKSF 103.7 FM Sampler For AIDS Relief, Vol. 14 (2003)
- Forever, For Always, For Luther (2004) on "Stop To Love"
- First Annual Smoothie Award Winners (2004)
- Live Your Life With Verve: Autumn Moods (2004)
- Dreams And Vision (2005)
- WNUA 95.5 Smooth Jazz Sampler, Vol. 18 (2005)
- Jazziz: Women, Volume 7 (2006)
- KWJZ 98.9 Smooth Jazz Vol. 10 (2006)
- Wave Music, Vol. 9: Max (2006)
- The Best Christmas... Ever! (Poland) (2006)
- Smooth Sounds of the Season, Vol. 1: Circuit City Exclusive (2006)
- KKSF 103.7 FM Sampler For AIDS Relief, Vol. 17 (2006)
- Smooth Ones (2007)
- Smooth Jazz Hits (2009)
- Smooth Jazz No. 1 Hits (2011)
- Smooth Jazz Hits: Ultimate Grooves (2012)
