= Summer Horns =

Studio album by Dave Koz, Gerald Albright, Mindi Abair & Richard Elliot
- Released: May 7, 2013
- Genre: Jazz
- Length: 55:39
- Label: Concord
- Producer: John Burk (exec.); Dave Koz (exec.); Paul Brown; Darren Rahn (co.)

Professional ratings
Review scores
Source	Rating
AllMusic	3.5/5 stars

Summer Horns is a collaboration album by Dave Koz, Gerald Albright, Mindi Abair and Richard Elliot. It was released on May 7, 2013 via Concord Records. The album was nominated for Grammy Award for Best Pop Instrumental Album at the 56th Annual Grammy Awards, losing to Steppin' Out by Herb Alpert.

== Track listing ==
1. "Always There" (William Jeffrey, Ronnie Laws) - 4:05
2. "Got to Get You into My Life" - 5:38
3. "Rise" (Andy Armer, Randy Badazz) - 5:08
4. "So Very Hard to Go" - 4:38
5. "Hot Fun in the Summertime" - 4:27
6. "Take Five" - 4:12
7. "25 or 6 to 4" - 4:47
8. "Reasons" (Philip Bailey, Maurice White, Charles Stepney) - 4:46
9. "I Got You (I Feel Good)" - 4:17
10. "You Haven't Done Nothin' - 3:46
11. "God Bless the Child" - 5:58
12. "Summer Horns" (Rick Braun, Paul Brown, Brian Culbertson, Dave Koz) - 3:57

== Personnel ==
Summer Horns

- Dave Koz – alto saxophone (1, 3, 5, 8, 11), lead soprano saxophone (3, 12), lead alto saxophone (4), baritone saxophone (4, 7), soprano saxophone (6), lead tenor saxophone (7), tenor saxophone (8–10), flute (8)
- Mindi Abair – alto saxophone (1–6, 8–10, 12), lead alto saxophone (7, 11)
- Gerald Albright – tenor saxophone (1, 3–6, 11, 12), alto saxophone (2, 7, 8, 10), lead alto saxophone (9)
- Richard Elliot – tenor saxophone (1, 2, 4–7, 9–11), lead tenor saxophone (3, 8, 12)

Musicians

- Tracy Carter – Wurlitzer electric piano (2, 4), Hammond B3 organ (2, 4, 7, 11), acoustic piano (4, 7), keyboards (7)
- Jeff Caruthers – keyboards (3, 8), guitars (3, 8), drum programming (3, 8)
- Marco Basci – keyboards (5, 12), drum programming (5), organ (9)
- David "Kahlid" Woods – keyboards (9), guitars (9), synth bass (9), drum programming (9)
- Darren Rahn – keyboards (10), synthesizers (10), Hammond B3 organ (10), drum programming (10)
- Paul Brown – guitars (1, 2, 4, 5, 10), electric guitars (7), steel guitar (7)
- Jay Gore – guitars (2, 4)
- Frank Selman – guitars (10)
- Jon Woodhead – guitars (11)
- Randy Jacobs – guitars (12)
- Roberto Valley – bass (2–5, 7, 8, 11, 12), acoustic bass (6)
- Mel Brown – bass (10)
- Ricky Lawson – drums (1, 2, 4, 5, 7, 9, 11, 12)
- Lenny Castro – percussion (4, 5, 7, 8, 10, 12)
- Lee Thornburg – trombone (1, 4), flugelhorn (1), trumpet (4)
- Nick Lane – trombone (2)
- Brian Culbertson – trombone (5, 10)
- Greg Adams – flugelhorn (1)
- Sean Billings – trumpet (2)
- Rick Braun – trumpet (10), flugelhorn (10)
- Michael McDonald – vocals (4)
- Jeffrey Osborne – vocals (5, 11)
- Jonathan Butler – vocals (5, 10)
- Billy Mondragon – backing vocals (5)
- Eric Mondragon – backing vocals (5)
- Damon Real – backing vocals (5)

Arrangements

- Marco Basci – rhythm arrangements (1, 5, 12), horn arrangements (12)
- Greg Adams – horn arrangements (1, 4, 5, 8, 12)
- Tracy Carter – rhythm arrangements (2, 4, 7, 11)
- Tom Scott – horn arrangements (2, 3, 7, 11)
- Jeff Caruthers – rhythm arrangements (3, 8)
- Gordon Goodwin – arrangerments (6)
- David "Kahlid" Woods – rhythm arrangements (9)
- Gerald Albright – horn arrangements (9, 10)
- Darren Rahn – arrangements (10)
- Paul Brown – rhythm arrangements (12)

=== Production ===
- John Burk – executive producer
- Dave Koz – executive producer
- Paul Brown – producer, recording, mixing
- Darren Rahn – co-producer (10), recording
- Jeff Caruthers – recording
- Carmen Grillo – recording
- John Lee – recording
- Grady Walker – recording
- David "Kahlid" Woods – recording
- Lee Herschberg – mastering
- Michael Stever – music copyist (9, 10)
- Mary Hogan – A&R administration
- Larissa Collins – creative direction
- Greg Allen – art direction, design, photography
- W.F. Leopold Management, Inc. – management

== Chart history ==
Chart (2013)	Peak position
US Billboard 200	84
US Top Jazz Albums (Billboard)	2
US Top Holiday Albums (Billboard)	8
