= Lucky Man (Dave Koz album) =

Studio album by Dave Koz
- Released: June 29, 1993 (NYC); November 1993 (USA); May 1994 (international)
- Recorded: March 1992 – June 1993
- Studio: JHL Sound (Pacific Palisades, California); The Village Recorder, Record One, Westlake Studios, The Bakery Recording Studios and Who Did That Music? (Los Angeles, California); O'Henry Sound Studios and Ocean Studios (Burbank, California); Ocean Way Recording, Trax Recording Studio and The Bunny Hop (Hollywood, California); Larrabee North and Bill Schnee Studios (North Hollywood, California); Larrabee West (West Hollywood, California); Kiva Recording and The Zoo (Encino, California); The Loft Recording Studios (Bronxville, New York)
- Genre: Smooth jazz
- Length: 59:53
- Label: Capitol
- Producer: Dennis Lambert; Jeff Lorber; Dave Koz; Jeff Koz; Carl Sturken; Evan Rogers

Dave Koz chronology
Dave Koz (1990)	Lucky Man (1993)	Off the Beaten Path (1996)

Singles from Lucky Man
- 1. "Silverlining" Released: November 17, 1993; 2. "Shakin' The Shack" Released: June 15, 1994; 3. "Lucky Man" Released: October 18, 1994

Professional ratings
Review scores
Source	Rating
Allmusic	4.5/5 stars

Lucky Man is the second studio album by saxophonist Dave Koz. It was released by Capitol Records on June 29, 1993, in NYC, followed by a nationwide release in November 1993 and international release in May 1994. The album peaked at number 2 on Billboard Top Contemporary Jazz Albums chart. The album has sold over 500,000 copies in the United States and has thus been certified gold by the RIAA.

One of the tracks on the album — "Faces of the Heart" — was used as the theme to the ABC soap opera General Hospital from 1993 to 2004.

== Track listing ==
No.	Title	Writer(s)	Length
1.	"Shakin' the Shack" (featuring Robben Ford & Chester Thompson)	Dave Koz, Jeff Lorber	6:05
2.	"You Make Me Smile"	Jeff Koz, D.Koz	4:17
3.	"Faces of the Heart"	D.Koz, J.Koz, Jack Urbont	3:42
4.	"Don't Look Any Further (Prelude)"		0:40
5.	"Don't Look Any Further" (featuring Zelma Davis)	Franne Golde, Dennis Lambert, Duane Hitchings	5:19
6.	"Tender Is the Night" (featuring Phil Perry)	D.Koz, Evan Rogers, Carl Sturken	5:55
7.	"Saxman" (featuring Maceo Parker, Clarence Clemons, Stephen Kupka, Booker T. Jones, with a spoken introduction by Edward James Olmos)	Allee Willis, D.Koz	4:25
8.	"After Dark"	Lorber, D.Koz	6:22
9.	"Lucky Man" (featuring Charles Pettigrew)	Jud Friedman, D.Koz	3:26
10.	"Silver Lining"	D.Koz, Lorber	5:15
11.	"Wait a Little While"	Carlos Rios, D.Koz	5:39
12.	"Show Me the Way"	D.Koz, J.Koz	5:22
13.	"Misty"	Erroll Garner	3:19

== Personnel ==
- Dave Koz – alto saxophone (1, 3, 5, 7–13), baritone saxophone (1, 13), tenor saxophone (1, 7, 13), arrangements (1, 2, 4–12), keyboards (2, 6, 10, 12), soprano saxophone (2, 6, 7), additional keyboards (3, 7, 11), programming (4), saxophone (4), backing chanter (4), breath noises (4), backing vocals (5), EWI (6, 7), whisperers (7)
- Jeff Lorber – keyboards (1, 8, 10, 11), arrangements (1, 2, 4, 5, 7, 9), drum programming (8, 10), synth bass (10, 11), programming (11)
- Bill Payne – acoustic piano (1)
- Chester Thompson – organ (1)
- Jeff Koz – keyboards (2, 12), acoustic guitar (2, 12), bass programming (2), drum programming (2), arrangements (2, 11, 12), electric guitar (3), nylon guitar (3)
- Brad Cole – keyboards (3), acoustic piano (3), sax section arrangements (13)
- Dennis Lambert – programming (4), arrangements (4), backing chanter (4), backing vocals (5)
- Tim Carmon – keyboard programming (5)
- Anthony DeTiege – keyboard programming (5)
- Billy Moss – keyboard programming (5)
- Claude Gaudette – keyboards (6), acoustic piano (6), synth bass (6), strings (6), string arrangements (6), bass (7), drum programming (7)
- Carl Sturken – keyboards (6), acoustic guitar (6), arrangements (6)
- John Barnes – acoustic piano (7)
- Kenny Moore – acoustic piano (7)
- Booker T. Jones – organ (7)
- Robbie Buchanan – keyboards (9), synthesizer programming (9), arrangements (9)
- Greg Phillinganes – acoustic piano (12)
- Robben Ford – guitars (1)
- Oliver Leiber – additional guitars (1), guitars (10)
- Michael Thompson – electric guitar (2, 12)
- Bob Mann – acoustic guitar (3)
- Paul Jackson, Jr. – guitars (7, 8), rhythm guitar (10)
- Teddy Castellucci – acoustic guitar (9), electric guitar (9)
- Buzz Feiten – guitar fills (10), additional guitars (11)
- Carlos Rios – electric guitar (11), guitar solo (11)
- Alec Milstein – bass (1), electric bass (5, 8, 10, 11)
- Nathan East – bass (2, 12), electric bass (7)
- John Pena – bass (3)
- Jimmy Haslip – fretless bass (6)
- Pino Palladino – fretless bass (8, 11)
- John Robinson – drums (1, 9, 11), drum fills (8)
- Rayford Griffin – drums (2, 12)
- Ricky Lawson – drums (3)
- Mark Schulman – drums (6)
- Ed Greene – drums (7)
- Curt Bisquera – drums (10)
- Lenny Castro – percussion (1, 2, 10, 12)
- Michito Sanchez – percussion (3)
- Steve Reid – percussion (6)
- Michael Fisher – percussion (7, 9)
- Paulinho da Costa – percussion (8, 11)
- Maceo Parker – alto saxophone (7)
- Stephen "Doc" Kupka – baritone saxophone (7)
- Clarence Clemons – tenor saxophone (7)
- Jeremy Lubbock – string arrangements and conductor (3)
- Jules Chaikin – string contractor (3)
- Franne Golde – backing chanter (4), backing vocals (5)
- Evelyn King – backing chanter (4), backing vocals (5)
- Jheryl Lockhart – backing chanter (4), backing vocals (5)
- Jean McClain – backing chanter (4), backing vocals (5)
- Katrina Perkins – backing chanter (4), backing vocals (5)
- Zelma Davis – lead and backing vocals (5)
- Phil Perry – lead vocals (6)
- Evan Rogers – backing vocals (6), arrangements (6)
- Edward James Olmos – spoken introduction (7)
- Charles Pettigrew – vocals (9)

Party Goers on "Saxman"

- Tim Carmon, Anthony DeTiege, Jud Friedman, Karin Friedman, Audrey Koz, Norman Koz, Bobby Kranc, Paul La Combe, Tina Lambert, Simone Lazer, Hilary Mandel, Mark Mattson, Cassandre McGowan, Billy Moss, Harley Neuman, David Pearlman, David Perler, Allan Rich, Nick Smith, David Williams, Patrick Wilson, Roberta Wilson and Taylor Rose Wilson

Choir on "Show Me the Way"

- Alex Brown, Jim Gilstrap, Phillip Ingram, Katrina Perkins, Jeff Pescetto, Leslie Smith, Yvonne Williams, Gigi Worth, Mona Lisa Young and Terry Young

== Production ==
- Bruce Lundvall – executive producer
- Dave Koz – producer (1–3, 6, 8, 10–13), associate producer (5, 7, 9), liner notes
- Jeff Lorber – producer (1, 8, 10), engineer
- Jeff Koz – producer (2, 3, 11, 12)
- Dennis Lambert – producer (5, 7, 9)
- Evan Rogers – producer (6)
- Carl Sturken – producer (6)
- Nick Els – engineer
- Gabriel Moffat – engineer
- Ed Murphy – engineer
- Doug Rider – engineer, mixing (13)
- Allen Sides – engineer
- Gabe Veltri – engineer
- Dan Bosworth – second engineer
- Martin Brumbach – second engineer
- Jim Champagne – second engineer
- Mark Levinson – second engineer
- Bob Loftus – second engineer
- Nica Lorber – second engineer
- Eric Rudd – second engineer
- Mick Stern – second engineer
- Shelly Stewart – second engineer
- Howard Willing – second engineer
- John Zaika – second engineer
- Alan Meyerson – mixing (1–12)
- John Chamberlin – second mix engineer (1–12)
- Kimm James – second mix engineer (1–12)
- Thom Russo – second mix engineer (1–12)
- Jamie Seyberth – second mix engineer (1–12)
- Willie Will – second mix engineer (1–12)
- Jeff Shannon – second mix engineer (13)
- Steve Hall – mastering at Future Disc (Hollywood, California)
- Colleen Donahue-Reynolds – project coordinator (6)
- Jeffrey Fey – art direction
- Tommy Steele – art direction, design
- Scott Morgan – photography

== Charts ==
Album
Year	Chart	Position
1993	Billboard 200	176
1993	Top Contemporary Jazz Albums	2

Single
Title	Year	Chart	Position
You Make Me Smile	1993	Adult Contemporary	20

== Certifications ==
Country	Certification	Sales/shipments
United States	Gold	500,000
