= Dave Koz (album) =

Studio album by Dave Koz
- Released: September 25, 1990
- Recorded: August – September 1989, November 1989 – May 1990
- Studio: Studio Ultimo and The Village Recorder (Los Angeles, California); JHL Sound (Pacific Palisades, California); Ground Control and Soundcastle (Santa Monica, California); Entourage Studios, The Lighthouse, Kingsound Studios and Larrabee Sound Studios (North Hollywood, California); Baby'O Recorders (Hollywood, California); Knobworld (Echo Park, California); Bunny Hop Studios (Sherman Oaks, California); O'Henry Sound Studios and The Enterprise (Burbank, California); The Loft Recording Studios (Bronxville, New York); The Sandbox Studios (Easton, Connecticut)
- Genre: Smooth jazz
- Length: 51:41
- Label: Capitol
- Producer: Steve Barri; Claude Gaudette; Dave Koz; Jeff Koz; Jeff Lorber; Randy Nicklaus; Tony Peluso; Evan Rogers; Carl Sturken; Elliot Wolff

Dave Koz chronology
Dave Koz (1990)	Lucky Man (1993)

Singles from Dave Koz
- 1. "Emily" Released: March 15, 1990; 2. "Nothing But The Radio On" Released: May 1, 1990; 3. "Castle of Dreams" Released: February 1991

Professional ratings
Review scores
Source	Rating
AllMusic	4/5 stars

Dave Koz is the 1990 debut album by Dave Koz. It was released on Capitol Records on September 25, 1990. Koz co-wrote eight of the 11 tracks, as well as having a reworking of the Richard Marx hit "Endless Summer Nights". He is supported by various people depending on the song.

== Track listing ==
1. "So Far from Home" (Dave Koz, Jeff Lorber) - 6:10
2. "Emily" (Bobby Caldwell, D. Koz, Lorber) - 5:30
3. "Give It Up" (D. Koz, Lorber, Richard Marx) - 5:53
4. "Nothing but the Radio On" (featuring Joey Diggs) (Jeff Klaven, Sam Rose, Geoff Rose) - 4:31
5. "Castle of Dreams" (D. Koz, Jeff Koz) - 5:00
6. "Endless Summer Nights" (Richard Marx) - 5:01
7. "Love of My Life" (featuring Cole Basquē) (D. Koz, Elliot Wolff) - 4:24
8. "Art of Key Noise" (D. Koz, Claude Gaudette) - 0:27
9. "Perfect Stranger" (D. Koz, Evan Rogers, Carl Sturken) - 4:34
10. "If Love Is All We Have" (featuring Cole Basquē) (Jacques Davidovicci, Maribeth Derry, Brice Homs) - 4:27
11. "Yesterday's Rain" (D. Koz, Rogers, Sturken) - 5:51

== Production ==
- Allen Kovac – executive producer
- Bruce Lundvall – executive producer
- Dave Koz – producer (1–3, 5), co-producer (6, 10), associate producer (9, 11)
- Jeff Lorber – producer (1–3), recording (1–3), additional producer (4)
- Steve Barri – producer (4)
- Tony Peluso – producer (4), recording (4), mixing (4)
- Jeff Koz – producer (5)
- Claude Gaudette – producer (6)
- Randy Nicklaus – producer (6)
- Elliot Wolff – producer (7), recording (7)
- Evan Rogers – producer (9, 11)
- Carl Sturken – producer (9, 11)
- Bruce Sugar – recording (5)
- Howard Lee Wolen – recording (6)
- Francis Buckley – recording (9, 11)
- Matt Noble – recording (9, 11)
- Eddie King – recording (10)
- Gabriel Moffat – second engineer (1, 2, 5)
- Fawn Rogers – second engineer (1–3)
- Nick Els – second engineer (5)
- Jeff DeMorris – second engineer (9, 11)
- Sally Browder – second engineer (10)
- Rob Ruscoe – second engineer (10)
- Alan Meyerson – mixing (1, 2)
- Keith Cohen – mixing (3)
- Steve Peck – mixing (5–7)
- Darrell Gustamacho – mixing (9, 11)
- Neal Pogue – mix assistant (1–3)
- Joel Stoner – mix assistant (4)
- John Schmit – mix assistant (5–7)
- Mike Harlow – mix assistant (9, 11)
- Steve Hall – mastering at Future Disc (Hollywood, CA)
- Mark Sullivan – production coordinator
- Julie Barri – production coordinator (4)
- Dean Freeman – photography
- Jeffrey Fey – art direction
- Tommy Steele – art direction

== Personnel ==
- Dave Koz – alto saxophone (1, 3–7, 9), soprano saxophone (2, 6, 9–11), EWI (2, 6), arrangements (5), baritone saxophone (7, 9), tenor saxophone (7, 9, 10), saxophone key (8), breath noise (8), backing vocals (9)
- Jeff Lorber – keyboards (1–3), guitars (1, 3), drum programming (1–3), additional keyboards (4)
- Jim Lang – keyboards (4), drum programming (4), arrangements (4)
- Jeff Koz – keyboards (5), guitars (5), drum programming (5), arrangements (5), backing vocals (9)
- Claude Gaudette – additional keyboards (4, 5), keyboards (6, 10), drum programming (6, 10), arrangements (6, 10)
- Elliot Wolff – keyboards (7), drum programming (7)
- Carl Sturken – keyboards (9, 11), drum programming (9, 11)
- Buzz Feiten – guitars (1–3)
- Charles Fearing – guitars (4)
- Carlos Rios – air guitar (5)
- Paul Jackson, Jr. – guitars (7, 10)
- Alec Milstein – electric bass (1, 4)
- Randy Jackson – fretless bass (2)
- Matt Bissonette – fretless bass (5)
- Sylvain Bolduc – bass sound design (6, 10)
- Paulinho da Costa – percussion (1–3)
- Billy Lewis – cymbal rolls (2)
- Lenny Castro – percussion (5, 6)
- Steve Reid – percussion (9, 11)
- Kevin Cloud – snare drum (11)
- Judd Miller – EWI programming (2, 6), Yamaha WX7 programming (5)
- Tom Scott – Yamaha WX7 (5)
- Tony Peluso – arrangements (4)
- Randy Nicklaus – arrangements (6)
- Phillip Ingram – backing vocals (3, 6)
- Joey Diggs – lead vocals (4), backing vocals (4)
- Marva Barnes – backing vocals (4)
- Portia Griffin – backing vocals (4)
- Bunny Hull – backing vocals (6)
- Gigi Shuttleworth – backing vocals (6)
- Cole Basqué – lead vocals (7, 10)
- Elisa Fiorillo – backing vocals (9)
- Michelle Gilgan – backing vocals (9)
- Audrey Koz – backing vocals (9)
- Evan Rogers – backing vocals (9), lead vocals (11)
- Mark Schulman – backing vocals (9)
