= Dave Koz =

American saxophonist (born 1963)

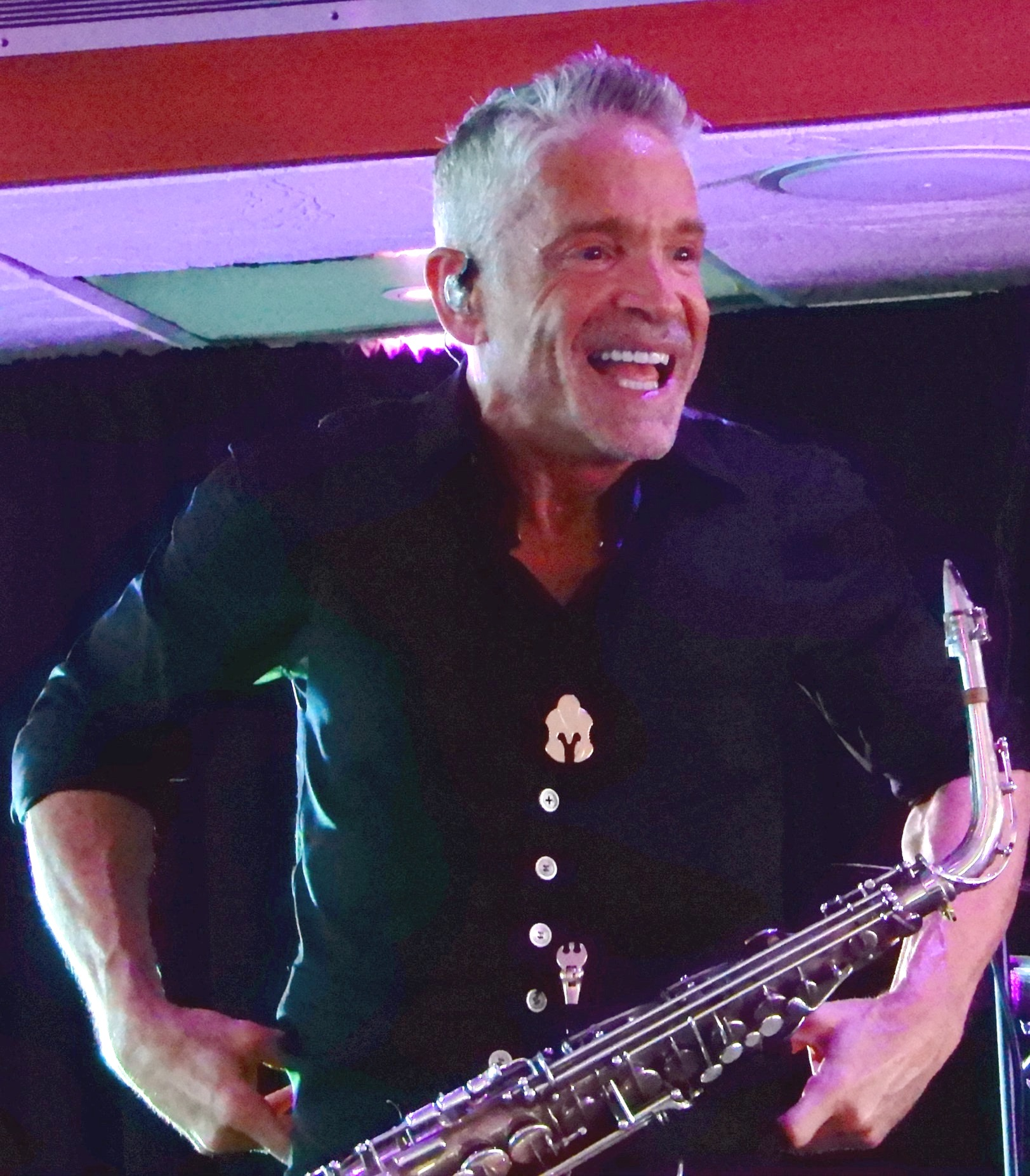
- Koz in 2018

Background information
- Born: David Stephen Koz; March 27, 1963 (age 63); Tarzana, California, U.S.
- Genres: Smooth jazz, rock, glam rock, heavy metal (formerly)
- Occupations: Musician, composer, record producer, radio personality
- Instruments: Soprano and alto saxophones
- Works: Dave Koz discography
- Years active: 1987–present
- Labels: Capitol, EMI, Rendezvous, Concord
- Website: davekoz.com

David Stephen Koz (born March 27, 1963) is an American saxophonist, composer, record producer, and radio personality based in Los Angeles, California.

== Early life ==
Dave Koz was born in Los Angeles, California to Jewish parents: Norman, a dermatologist and Audrey, a pharmacist. He grew up in the Encino neighborhood. Dave has a brother, Jeff, who is also a musician, and a sister, Roberta. Although he is Jewish, Koz plays both Christmas and occasional Hanukkah songs at his concerts. He attended William Howard Taft High School in Woodland Hills, Los Angeles, California, performing on saxophone as a member of the school jazz band. He later graduated from UCLA with a degree in mass communications in 1986, and only weeks after his graduation, decided to make a go of becoming a professional musician.

== Career ==
Within weeks of deciding to be a professional musician, he was recruited as a member of Bobby Caldwell's tour. Koz was originally a rock saxophonist before he moved to smooth jazz in 1989. For the rest of the 1980s, Koz served as a session musician in several rock bands, and toured with Jeff Lorber. Koz was a member of rock musician Richard Marx's band and toured with Marx throughout the late 1980s and early 1990s, which was around the time he recurred as the guest saxophonist on the syndicated late-night talk show The Arsenio Hall Show. He also played in the house band of CBS' short-lived The Pat Sajak Show, with Tom Scott as bandleader.

In 1989, Koz decided to pursue a solo career, and began recording for Capitol Records. His albums there include Dave Koz (his 1990 solo debut), Lucky Man, The Dance, and Saxophonic. Saxophonic was nominated for both a Grammy Award and an NAACP Image Award.

Koz released his second album, Lucky Man, in 1993. During production of the album in 1992, Koz was approached by the producers of ABC's General Hospital to perform on the show after his track entitled "Emily", from his Dave Koz album, was used as part of the show's soundtrack that year. After his GH appearance, executive producer Wendy Riche commissioned Koz to write a new theme song for the soap. Koz took elements from the show's existing theme song, Jack Urbont's "Autumn Breeze", and merged the chorus notes into a brand new smooth jazz composition titled "Faces of the Heart". The new theme music made its debut on General Hospital's 30th anniversary show, which aired April 1, 1993, and remained as the show's title track until August 27, 2004. "Faces of the Heart" ended up as the third track on Koz's Lucky Man album.

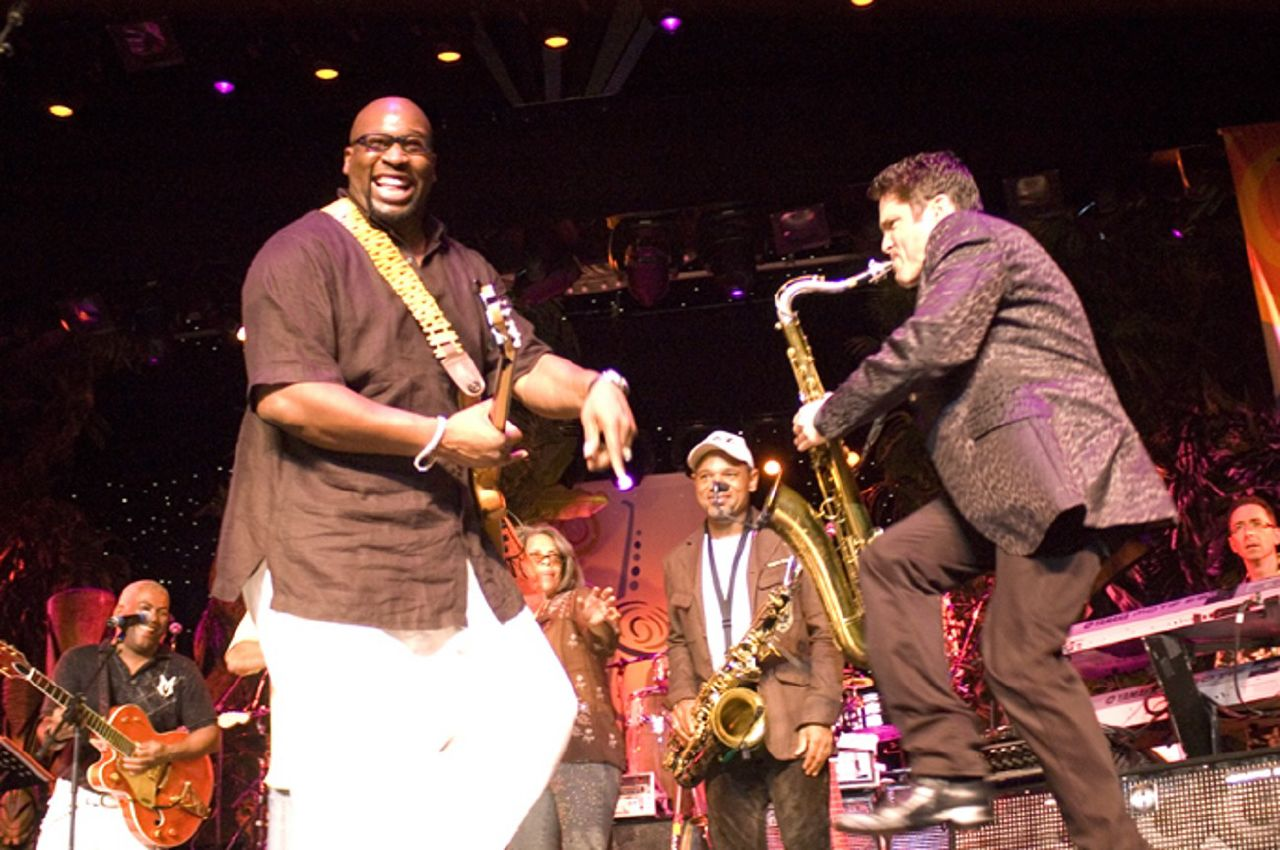
Dave and Wayman Tisdale performing at the Dave Koz & Friends Smooth Jazz Cruise 2006

In 1994, Koz began hosting a syndicated radio program, The Dave Koz Radio Show (formerly Personal Notes), featuring the latest music and interviews with who's who in the genre. Dave co-hosted The Dave Koz Morning Show on 94.7 The Wave, a smooth jazz station in Los Angeles for six years. He decided to leave the show in January 2007 and was replaced by Brian McKnight. In 2002, Koz started a record label, Rendezvous Entertainment, with Frank Cody and Hyman Katz.

In October 2004, Koz collaborated with ADA Band, Indonesia, for their single entitled "Manusia Bodoh" (lit. Stupid Person).

Koz has promoted annual Dave Koz & Friends Jazz Cruises since 2005.

Koz is the host of a weekly half-hour television series named Frequency put on by Fast Focus. Koz interviews musicians on the show such as Earth, Wind & Fire, Jonathan Butler, and Kelly Sweet. At the end of each interview, he plays along with the musician, adding some of his saxophone riffs to one of their hit songs.

Koz was also the bandleader on The Emeril Lagasse Show. The band, Dave Koz & The Kozmos, featured Jeff Golub (guitar), Philippe Saisse (keyboards), Conrad Korsch (bass guitar), and Skoota Warner (drums).

Koz hosts a weekly radio show on the Sirius-XM Radio Watercolors channel called "The Dave Koz Lounge," which airs Sundays at noon ET.

On September 22, 2009, Koz received a star on the Hollywood Walk of Fame.

In October 2010, Koz performed "Start All Over Again" in a Desperate Housewives season 7 episode "Let Me Entertain You", alongside singer Dana Glover. In July 2012, he appeared on The Eric André Show, season 1 episode 7, and sat in with the house band.

In December 2014, he opened Spaghettini & the Dave Koz Lounge, a restaurant and live music venue located at 184 North Canon Drive in Beverly Hills, California with business partners Cary Hardwick and Laurie Sisneros, who own Spaghettini in Seal Beach.

In 2018, Koz collaborated with guitarist and regular Vulfpeck contributor, Cory Wong, on two tracks, "The Optimist" and "Friends at Sea". The two collaborated again in 2021 for the album The Golden Hour, including the single "Today".

In 2022, Koz collaborated with singer-songwriter Ben Rector on the track "Supernatural" from Rector's album The Joy of Music.

In March 2025, Koz released Just Us, a duets album with Bob James. With seven original songs and three standards, Just Us is uniquely raw and unplugged with just the saxophone and piano only. Regarding the album, Koz has said, "When you only have two instruments, as we have here, taking up the entire sonic space, each can be heard in a much clearer, bolder, bigger way. It's amazing and scary because we hear all the breaths, clicks and pad noise. Those who go on this ride with us will hear our instruments in a whole new way."

== Instruments ==
Koz plays a Yamaha silver plated alto saxophone (YAS-62S Mk. I) with a No. 7 Beechler metal mouthpiece, a Yamaha straight silver plated Soprano saxophone (YSS-62S) or a vintage Conn curved soprano sax with a No. 8 Couf mouthpiece, and a Selmer Mark VI Tenor sax with a Berg-Larsen 90/2 hard rubber mouthpiece. As for reeds, he uses a No. 3 Rico Plasticover. Koz occasionally plays keyboards and piano, with which he also composes his songs.

== Personal life ==
In an April 2004 interview with The Advocate, Koz came out publicly as gay. He has been a resident of Sausalito, California since 1990.

== Discography ==
Solo studio albums

- Dave Koz (1990)
- Lucky Man (1993)
- Off the Beaten Path (1996)
- December Makes Me Feel This Way (1997)
- The Dance (1999)
- A Smooth Jazz Christmas (2001)
- Golden Slumbers: A Father's Lullaby (2002)
- Saxophonic (2003)
- Golden Slumbers: A Father's Love (2005)
- At the Movies (2007)
- Memories of a Winter's Night (2007)
- Hello Tomorrow (2010)
- Ultimate Christmas (2011)
- Dave Koz and Friends: Summer Horns (2013)
- Rest (2014)
- Dave Koz & Friends: The 25th of December (2014)
- Dave Koz and Friends: 20th Anniversary Christmas (2017)
- Dave Koz and Friends: Summer Horns II From A to Z (2018)
- Gifts of the Season (2019)
- A New Day (2020)
- A Romantic Night In (The Love Songs Album) (2021)

Collaboration studio albums

- The Golden Hour | Dave Koz and Cory Wong (2021)
- Just Us | Bob James and Dave Koz (2025)

== Awards and nominations ==
Dave Koz awards and nominations
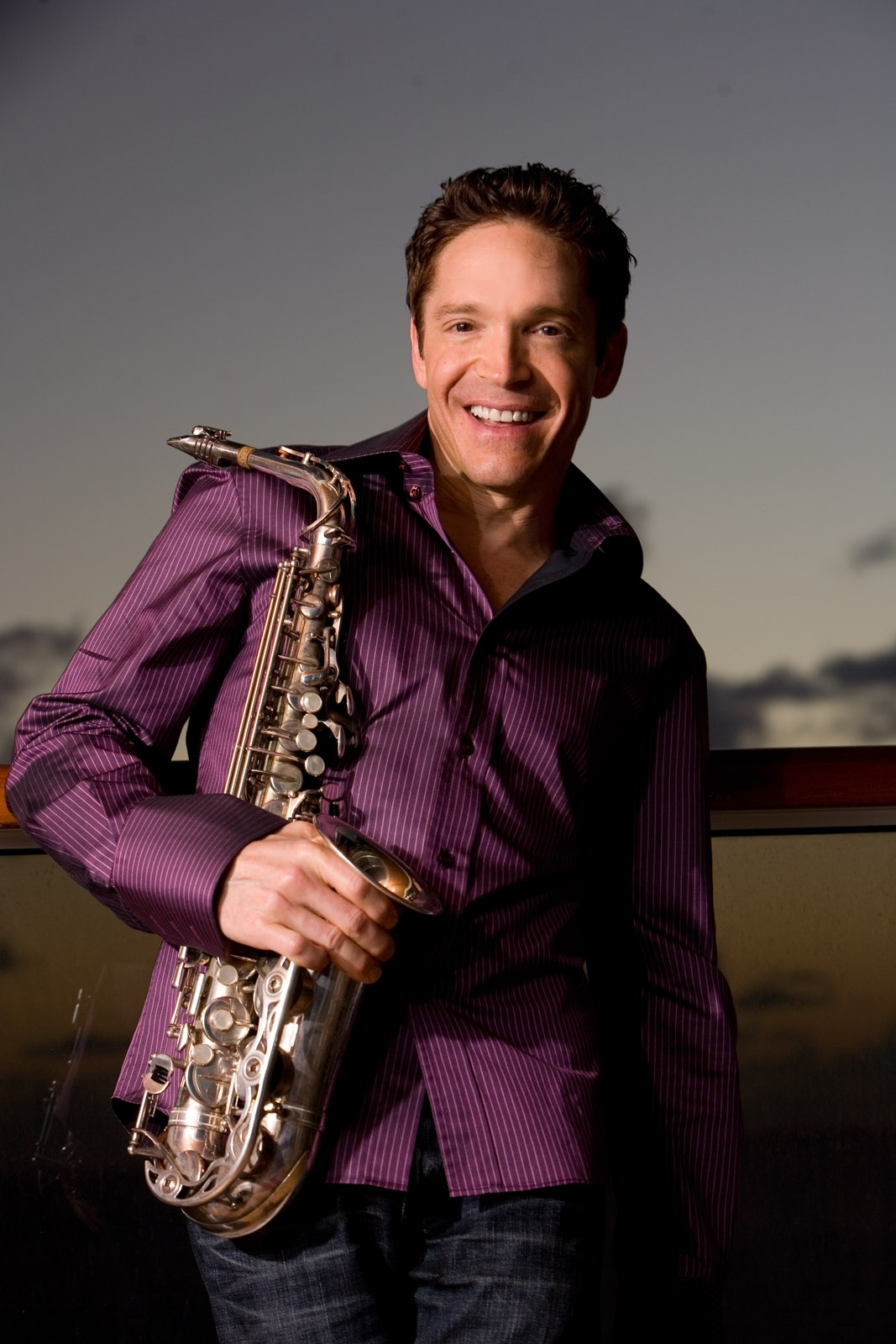
Awards and nominations
Award	Wins	Nominations
Grammy Awards	0	9
NAACP Image Awards	0	1
Soul Train Music Award	1	1

Totals (Note: Certain award groups do not simply award one winner. They acknowledge several different recipients, have runners-up, and have third place. Since this is a specific recognition and is different from losing an award, runner-up mentions are considered wins in this award tally. For simplification and to avoid errors, each award in this list has been presumed to have had a prior nomination.)
- Wins: 1
- Nominations: 11

Year	Nominated work	Event	Award	Result	Ref
2002	A Smooth Jazz Christmas	Grammy Awards	Best Pop Instrumental Album	Nominated	
2003	"Blackbird" (with Jeff Koz)	Grammy Awards	Best Pop Instrumental Performance	Nominated	
2004	"Honey-Dipped"	Grammy Awards	Best Pop Instrumental Performance	Nominated	
2005	Saxophonic	Grammy Awards	Best Pop Instrumental Album	Nominated	
2008	At the Movies	Grammy Awards	Best Pop Instrumental Album	Nominated	
2008	"Over the Rainbow"	Grammy Awards	Best Pop Instrumental Performance	Nominated	
2011	Hello Tomorrow	Soul Train Music Award	Best Contemporary Jazz Artist/Group	Won	
2012	Hello Tomorrow	Grammy Awards	Best Pop Instrumental Album	Nominated	
2013	Live at the Blue Note Tokyo	Grammy Awards	Best Pop Instrumental Album	Nominated	
2014	Summer Horns (with Gerald Albright, Mindi Abair, and Richard Elliot)	Grammy Awards	Best Pop Instrumental Album	Nominated	
2015	Dave Koz & Friends: The 25th of December	NAACP Image Awards	Outstanding Jazz Album	Nominated	
2026	Just Us	Grammy Awards	Best Contemporary Instrumental Album	Pending	

== See also ==
- LGBTQ representation in jazz
