= The Dance (Dave Koz album) =

Studio album by Dave Koz
- Released: September 28, 1999
- Studio: The Loft Recording Studios (Bronxville, New York); The Hit Factory (New York City, New York); Chicago Recording Company (Chicago, Illinois); Paramount Recording Studios, Sunset Sound and Ocean Way Recording (Hollywood, California); Coal Mine Studios (North Hollywood, California); Westlake Audio and Java Studios (Los Angeles, California); JHL Sound (Pacific Palisades, California); HUM Music & Sound Design (Santa Monica, California); 29th Street Studio (Torrance, California); O'Henry Sound Studios (Burbank, California)
- Genre: Smooth jazz
- Length: 60:40
- Label: Capitol
- Producer: Glen Ballard; Carl Sturken; Evan Rogers; Jeff Lorber; Jeff Koz; Burt Bacharach; Montell Jordan; Schappell Crawford; Brad Cole; Dave Koz

Dave Koz chronology
December Makes Me Feel This Way (1997)	The Dance (1999)	A Smooth Jazz Christmas (2001)

Professional ratings
Review scores
Source	Rating
AllMusic	4.5/5 stars

The Dance is the fifth studio album by American smooth jazz saxophonist Dave Koz. It was released by Capitol Records on September 28, 1999. The album peaked at number 2 on the Billboard Top Contemporary Jazz Albums chart. The album sold more than 500,000 copies and was certified gold by the Recording Industry Association of America (RIAA).

== Track listing ==
No.	Title	Writer(s)	Length
1.	"Together Again"	Dave Koz, Jeff Koz	4:17
2.	"I'm Waiting for You"	D.Koz, J.Lorber	3:18
3.	"Can't Let You Go (The Sha La Song)" (featuring Luther Vandross)	D.Koz, Carl Sturken, Evan Rogers	4:17
4.	"Careless Whisper" (featuring Montell Jordan)	George Michael, Andrew Ridgeley	6:11
5.	"Love Is on the Way" (featuring Chris Botti)	Jeff Lorber, D.Koz	4:45
6.	"Know You by Heart"	D.Koz, Skip Ewing	3:39
7.	"Surrender"	J.Koz, D.Koz	4:43
8.	"You Are Me, I Am You" (featuring Marc Antoine)	D.Koz, Sturken, Rogers	4:52
9.	"The Dance" (featuring BeBe Winans)	Tony Arata	5:19
10.	"Cuban Hideaway"	D.Koz	2:14
11.	"The Bright Side" (featuring Jonathan Butler)	D.Koz, Lorber	4:41
12.	"Don't Give Up" (featuring Burt Bacharach)	Burt Bacharach, D.Koz	4:02
13.	"Right by Your Side"	D.Koz, J.Koz	4:04
14.	"I'll Be There"	Berry Gordy, Bob West, Willie Hutch, Hal Davis	4:18

== Personnel ==
- Dave Koz – alto saxophone, baritone saxophone, soprano saxophone, tenor saxophone, keyboards
- Jeff Koz – keyboards, acoustic guitar, bass, drum programming
- Jeff Lorber – keyboards (2, 11), drum programming (2, 11)
- Carl Sturken – keyboards (3, 8), acoustic guitar (3, 8), electric guitar (3, 8), bass (3, 8), drum programming (3, 8)
- Mark Portmann – additional keyboards (3), keyboards (8)
- Schappell Crawford – keyboards (4), Fender Rhodes (4)
- Urs Wiesendanger – additional keyboards (5, 11), percussion (5)
- David Benoit – acoustic piano (6)
- Glen Ballard – keyboards (9), acoustic piano (9)
- Randy Kerber – Fender Rhodes (9)
- Burt Bacharach – acoustic piano (12)
- Greg Phillinganes – keyboards (12)
- Brad Cole – additional keyboards (14)
- Michael Thompson – electric guitar (1, 4, 7, 12, 13), nylon guitar (4), guitars (9, 14), acoustic guitar (13)
- Michael Landau – acoustic guitar (2, 11), electric guitar (2, 5, 11)
- Jay Williams – acoustic guitar (4)
- Paul Jackson, Jr. – electric guitar (5)
- Tony Maiden – wah wah guitar (7)
- Marc Antoine – Spanish guitar (8)
- Jonathan Butler – acoustic guitar (11), vocals (11)
- Dean Parks – acoustic guitar (12), electric guitar (12)
- Al McKay – electric guitar (14)
- Bill Sharpe – bass (1, 7)
- Nathan East – bass (2, 11)
- Freddie Washington – bass (6)
- John Peña – bass (8, 14)
- Neil Stubenhaus – bass (12)
- Gota Yashiki – drum samples (1)
- Steve Ferrone – drums (3)
- George Johnson – drums (4)
- Montell Jordan – drum programming (4), lead vocals (4)
- John Robinson – drums (5, 11, 12, 14)
- Ricky Lawson – drums (6)
- Matt Chamberlain – drums (9)
- Vinnie Colaiuta – drums (13)
- Lenny Castro – percussion (1, 3, 6, 7, 12, 13)
- Paulinho da Costa – percussion (2, 5, 11)
- Brian Kilgore – percussion (9)
- Luis Conte – percussion (10)
- Nick Lane – trombone (12)
- Chris Botti – trumpet (5)
- Wayne Bergeron – flugelhorn (12), trumpet (12)
- Luther Vandross – vocals (3)
- Sue Ann Carwell – backing vocals (4, 12)
- Shae Jones – backing vocals (4)
- Cindy Mizelle – backing vocals (8)
- Audrey Wheeler – backing vocals (8)
- BeBe Winans – lead vocals (9)
- Gloria Agustus – backing vocals (9)
- Kathy Hazzard – backing vocals (9)
- Janet Mims – backing vocals (9)
- Ricky Nelson – backing vocals (9)
- Alfie Silas – backing vocals (9)
- Jackie Simley Stevens – backing vocals (12)
- Mervyn Warren – lead vocals (14), backing vocals (14)
- Terry Bradford – backing vocals (14)
- Timothy Owens – backing vocals (14)
- David Thomas – backing vocals (14)

Arrangements

- Luther Vandross – vocal arrangements (3)
- David Benoit – string arrangements (4, 6)
- Bruce Dukov – concertmaster (4, 6)
- Dave Koz – arrangements (5, 13)
- Jeff Koz – arrangements (5, 13), vocal arrangements (14)
- Brad Cole – arrangements (10)
- Mervyn Warren – vocal arrangements (14)

== Production ==
- Roy Lott – executive producer
- Dave Koz – producer, engineer
- Jeff Koz – producer, engineer
- Jeff Lorber – producer (2, 11)
- Evan Rogers – producer (3, 8)
- Carl Sturken – producer (3, 8)
- Schappell Crawford – producer (4)
- Montell Jordan – producer (4)
- Glen Ballard – producer (9)
- Brad Cole – producer (10), engineer
- Scott Campbell – engineer
- Bryan Carrigan – engineer
- Anne Catalino – engineer
- Nick Els – engineer
- Clark Germain – engineer
- Al Hemberger – engineer
- Ed Miller – engineer
- Gus Mossler – engineer
- Frank Nadasdy – engineer
- Doug Rider – engineer
- Gabe Veltri – engineer
- John Vigran – engineer
- Jeff Woodruff – engineer
- Allen Sides – string recording (4, 6)
- Peter Mokran – mixing at Conway Studios (Hollywood, California)
- Steve Hall – mastering at Future Disc (Hollywood, California)
- Valerie Pack – project coordinator
- Ceinwyn Clark – production coordinator
- Jolie Levine-Aller – production coordinator
- Jeffrey Fey – art direction, design
- Tommy Steele – art direction
- Sam Jones – photography
- Adriana Verwey – stylist

== Charts ==
Album
Year	Chart	Position
1999	Billboard 200	190
1999	Billboard Top Contemporary Jazz Albums	2
1999	Billboard R&B/Hip-Hop Albums	67
2000	Billboard Jazz Albums	3

Single
Title	Year	Chart	Position
"Careless Whisper"	2000	Billboard Adult Contemporary	30
"Know You by Heart"	2000	Billboard Adult Contemporary	26

== Certifications ==
Country	Certification	Sales/shipments
United States	Gold	500,000
