= You Make Me Smile (song) =

Single by Dave Koz

from the album Lucky Man
- Released: September 1992
- Recorded: August 1992
- Genre: Smooth jazz
- Length: 4:17 (Album Edit)
- Label: Capitol
- Songwriter(s): Dave Koz, Jeff Koz

Dave Koz singles chronology
| "Emily" (1990) | "You Make Me Smile" (1992) | "Faces of the Heart" (1993) |

"You Make Me Smile" is a 1992 smooth jazz song by American saxophonist Dave Koz. The song appeared in his second album Lucky Man released in 1993.

== Chart performance ==
The song is the third Billboard chart hit of Koz, reaching number 20 in Hot Adult Contemporary Tracks.

== Music video ==
The music video of the song follows a serenade-like and somewhat comical events. Narrating texts of the events of the song appears in the video and also the lyrics of the song. Dave Koz plays his saxophone to a woman whom he loves. The woman seems to evade his advances, Koz continually try to melt her heart. At the end of the video the couple start dancing and the last narrating text reads: "Everybody happy... except the saxophone left under a streetlight to rust".

== Track listings ==
CD-Maxi

| No. | Title | Length |
|---|---|---|
| 1. | "You Make Me Smile" (Album Edit) | 4:17 |

== Charts ==
| Chart (1993) | Peak position |
|---|---|
| U.S. Billboard Adult Contemporary | 20 |
