= Hello Tomorrow (album) =

Studio album by Dave Koz
- Released: October 19, 2010
- Studio: Henson Recording Studios (Hollywood, California); The Village Studios, BCM Studios and G Studio Digital (Los Angeles, California); The Litterbox (Denver, Colorado); OsO Studios (Detroit, Michigan)
- Genre: Smooth jazz
- Length: 58:53
- Label: Concord
- Producer: John Burk; Marcus Miller

Dave Koz chronology
| Greatest Hits (2008) | Hello Tomorrow (2010) | Live at the Blue Tokyo (2012) |

Professional ratings
Review scores
| Source | Rating |
|---|---|
| Allmusic | 3.5/5 stars |

Hello Tomorrow is the ninth studio album by saxophone player Dave Koz. It was his first album released by Concord Records on October 19, 2010. Koz himself provided vocals on "This Guy's in Love with You". The album peaked at number 1 on Billboard Jazz Albums chart. On November 30, 2011, the album received a Nomination in the 54th Grammy Awards for Best Pop Instrumental Album.

== Track listing ==
| No. | Title | Writer(s) | Length |
|---|---|---|---|
| 1. | "Put the Top Down" (featuring Lee Ritenour) | Dave Koz, Brian Culbertson | 4:59 |
| 2. | "When Will I Know for Sure" (featuring Boney James) | Darren Rahn, Koz, Marcus Miller, Nate Harasim | 4:53 |
| 3. | "It's Always Been You" | Koz, Culbertson | 3:57 |
| 4. | "Getaway" (featuring Jonathan Butler and Sheila E.) | Carl Sturken, Evan Rogers, Koz | 4:45 |
| 5. | "This Guy's in Love with You" (featuring Herb Alpert) | Burt Bacharach, Hal David | 4:56 |
| 6. | "Anything's Possible" | Koz, Culbertson | 4:04 |
| 7. | "There's a Better Way" (featuring Keb' Mo') | Koz, Culbertson | 4:31 |
| 8. | "Start All Over Again" (featuring Dana Glover) | Dana Glover | 4:29 |
| 9. | "Think Big" (featuring Christian Scott, Marcus Miller, Keb' Mo', and Brian Culbertson) | Koz, Culbertson | 4:59 |
| 10. | "The Journey" | Marcus Miller | 5:54 |
| 11. | "Remember Where You Come From" (featuring Jeff Lorber) | Koz, Lorber | 4:34 |
| 12. | "Whisper in Your Ear" | Harvey Mason, Jr., Koz | 4:47 |
| 13. | "What You Leave Behind" | Koz | 1:56 |

== Personnel ==
- Dave Koz – alto saxophone (1, 3, 5, 7, 10–13), soprano saxophone (2, 4, 9, 11), tenor saxophone (4, 6, 8, 9), lead vocals (5), backing vocals (8), whisper (12)
- Brian Culbertson – keyboards (1, 3, 6), programming (1, 6), synthesizer programming (3), bass programming (3), trombone (9)
- David Delhomme – keyboards (1, 2, 4, 6, 10, 13), synthesizers (5)
- Bobby Sparks II – Hammond B3 organ (1, 4, 7, 12)
- Darren Rahn – keyboards (2), programming (2)
- Nate Harasim – additional keyboards (2), synthesizer programming (2), loops (2)
- Tim Carmon – Fender Rhodes (4, 10, 11), Wurlitzer electric piano (7)
- Greg Phillinganes – electric piano (5, 9), acoustic piano (10), Fender Rhodes (13)
- Jeff Lorber – keyboards (6, 11), acoustic piano solo (11)
- Dean Parks – keyboards (8), programming (8), guitars (8), arrangements (8)
- Harvey Mason, Jr. – keyboards (12), programming (12)
- Lee Ritenour – lead guitar (1)
- Jonathan Butler – guitars (1, 4), vocals (4)
- Ray Parker Jr. – guitars (1, 4, 7, 10, 11)
- Paul Jackson, Jr. – guitars (2, 3, 6, 10)
- John "Jubu" Smith – guitars (5, 9)
- Keb' Mo' – guitars (7, 9), vocals (7)
- John Burk – guitars (8)
- Marcus Miller – bass (1, 2, 4–12), horn arrangements (1, 6, 10, 11), vibraphone (5), backing vocals (5), keyboards (6), bass clarinet (9, 10), clarinet (9), Moog synthesizer (10), arrangements (10), guitars (13)
- Omar Hakim – drums (1, 4, 7, 10, 11)
- John Robinson – drums (2, 3, 5, 6, 8, 9)
- Sheila E. – percussion (1, 3, 4), vocals (4)
- Lenny Castro – percussion (2, 3, 6–9, 11), washboard (9)
- Dan Higgins – tenor saxophone (1, 6, 10, 11), flute (6, 10)
- Boney James – tenor saxophone (2)
- Chuck Findley – trombone (1, 6, 10), trumpet (1, 6, 10, 11)
- Alan Kaplan – trombone (11)
- Gary Grant – trumpet (1, 6, 10, 11)
- Herb Alpert – trumpet (5)
- Christian Scott – trumpet (9)
- Brian O'Connor – French Horn (3)
- John Capek – strings (5, 8), string arrangements (5, 8)
- Lynn Mabry – backing vocals (4)
- Evan Rogers – backing vocals (4)
- Lynne Fiddmont – backing vocals (5)
- Dana Glover – lead vocals (8), backing vocals (8)

== Production ==
- John Burk – producer
- Marcus Miller – producer
- Darren Rahn – additional production (2)
- Dean Parks – additional production (9)
- Brian Culbertson – co-producer (9)
- Jeff Lorber – co-producer (11)
- Harvey Mason, Jr. – co-producer (12)
- Don Murray – recording, mixing
- Seth Presant – recording
- Nicolas Essig – recording assistant
- Jon Fan – recording assistant
- Julian Smith – recording assistant
- Scott Smith – recording assistant
- Doug Sax – mastering
- Sangwook "Sunny" Nam – mastering
- The Mastering Lab (Ojai, California) – mastering location
- Larissa Collins – creative director
- Greg Allen – art direction, design, photography
- Shelly Willis – hair, make-up
- Monica Schweiger – stylist
- W.F. Leopold Management – management

== Charts ==
| Chart (2010) | Peak position |
|---|---|
| Billboard 200 | 104 |
| Jazz Albums | 1 |

Singles
| Year | Title | Chart | Position |
|---|---|---|---|
| 2010 | Put the Top Down | Jazz Songs | 1 |
| 2010 | Start All Over Again | Jazz Songs | 11 |
| 2011 | Anything's Possible | Jazz Songs | 1 |
