= Wild Heart (Mindi Abair album) =

Studio album by Mindi Abair
- Released: May 27, 2014
- Recorded: 2014
- Genre: Contemporary, smooth jazz
- Length: 49:17
- Label: Heads Up
- Producer: Adam Berg, Itai Shapira, Todd Simon & Mindi Abair

Mindi Abair chronology
Summer Horns (2013)	Wild Heart (2014)	Live in Seattle (2015)

Singles from Wild Heart
- 1. "Haute Sauce" Released: 2014; 2. "Amazing Game" Released: 2014; 3. "Wild Heart" Released: 2015

Wild Heart is the seventh full-length solo studio album by American musician Mindi Abair. Released on May 27, 2014, Wild Heart marks Abair's fourth release on Concord Records imprint, Heads Up International. The album debuted at number 1 on the Billboard Jazz Albums chart, staying there for two weeks. Wild Heart received a 2015 Grammy nomination in the Contemporary Instrumental Album category, Abair's second Grammy nomination.

== Background and recording ==
Wild Heart was recorded in late 2013 and early 2014 at several studios including Manifest Music in Santa Monica, California, Elevated Basement Studio in Savannah, Georgia, Morrisound in Tampa, Florida and Skip Saylor Studios in Northridge, California. The album features several guest musicians, including Max Weinberg, Gregg Allman, Booker T. Jones, Keb' Mo', Joe Perry and Trombone Shorty.

== Style and composition ==
Wild Heart saw Abair stepping away from her traditional smooth jazz style, for a more rock n roll influenced sound.

== Critical reception ==
Professional ratings
Review scores
Source	Rating
AllMusic	3.5/5 stars
AltSounds	3.5/5 stars
AllAboutJazz	3.5/5 stars
BopNJazz	5/5 stars

Wild Heart received mostly positive reviews from critics, who often commented on the different sound of the album. James Woods of AXS said "Wild Heart’s roots actually go back to when Abair found herself “moonlighting”—performing a lot of rock and roll, blues and organic music. So it should come as no surprise that sharing the stage with the likes of Aerosmith, Bruce Springsteen and Duran Duran would eventually be absorbed into her musical psyche. And it was those experiences that inspired Abair to want to capture the mojo she's been holding in for so long." and Thom Jurek of AllMusic called the record "a much rowdier, grimier fashion."

Jazz Weekly said “Abair’s sax growls, grunts and grinds like it’s a smoky joint in Lafayette, Louisiana, with more gristle than a T-Bone steak at The Pantry.” AllMusic said of the album; “Though it pays unapologetic tribute to retro inspirations, it does so with 21st century sophistication, a gritty, raucous spirit, and exceptional creative imagination.”

== Track listing ==
No.	Title	Writer(s)	Length
1.	"Amazing Game" (featuring Trombone Shorty)	Mindi Abair, Jim Peterik	4:22
2.	"I Can't Lose"	Mindi Abair, Tyrone Stevens	3:36
3.	"Wild Heart"	Mindi Abair, Dave Yaden	4:07
4.	"Haute Sauce"	Mindi Abair, Dave Yaden	3:18
5.	"Train"	Mindi Abair, Jim Peterik	3:27
6.	"Kick Ass" (featuring Joe Perry)	Mindi Abair, Matthew Hager	5:36
7.	"It'll Be Your Home" (featuring Keb' Mo')	Mindi Abair, Dave Yaden, Candace Devine	4:17
8.	"The Shakedown" (featuring Max Weinberg and Waddy Wachtel)	Mindi Abair, Waddy Wachtel	3:49
9.	"Kiddo's Revenge"	Mindi Abair, Dave Yaden	4:28
10.	"Addicted to You" (featuring Booker T. Jones)	Mindi Abair, Booker T. Jones	6:47
11.	"Just Say When" (featuring Gregg Allman)	Mindi Abair, Gregg Allman	5:30
Total length:			49:17

== Personnel ==
- Mindi Abair – alto saxophone, baritone saxophone, tenor saxophone, vocals (2), handclaps (8)
- Adam Berg – acoustic piano (1, 3, 8), handclaps (1), organ (2, 3, 5), tambourine (2, 5, 6), synthesizers (3, 4)
- Dave Yaden – acoustic piano (4, 9)
- Booker T. Jones – Hammond B3 organ (7, 10)
- Lance Abair – organ (8)
- Gregg Allman – Hammond B3 organ (11), guitars (11), vocals (11)
- Itai Shapira – guitars (1–10), bass (1–10), handclaps (1, 8)
- Joe Perry – guitar (6)
- Keb' Mo' – guitar (7), tambourine (7), vocals (7)
- Waddy Wachtel – guitars (8)
- Dave Burris – electric guitars (11)
- Kevin Scott – bass (11)
- Jake Najor – drums (1, 2, 3, 5, 6, 9)
- Blake Colie – drums (4)
- James Gadson – drums (7, 10)
- Max Weinberg – drums (8)
- Bud Harner – crash cymbal (1)
- Elizabeth Lea – trombone (1–9)
- Trombone Shorty – trombone (1)
- Todd Simon – trumpet (1–9), horn arrangements (1–9)

== Production ==
- John Burk – executive producer
- Bud Harner – executive producer, management
- Mindi Abair – producer
- Todd Simon – producer
- Adam Berg – producer, engineer, mixing
- Itai Shapira – producer, engineer
- Shane Baldwin – engineer
- David Burris – engineer
- Jim Morris – engineer
- John Wydrycs – engineer
- Allen Franco – second engineer, assistant engineer
- Kevin Cohen – assistant engineer
- John Silverman – assistant engineer
- Paul Blakemore – mastering
- Patty Palazzo – cover design
- Greg Allen – photography

== Chart positions ==
Chart (2014)	Peak position
US Top Contemporary Jazz Albums (Billboard)	1
US Top Jazz Albums (Billboard)	1
