= Saxophonic =

Studio album by Dave Koz
- Released: October 7, 2003
- Studio: Sunset Sound (Hollywood, California); The ColeMine (North Hollywood, California); JHL Sound and Palisades Zoo (Pacific Palisades, California); The Back Room (Glendale, California); BCM Studios (Los Angeles, California); HUM Studios (Santa Monica, California); The Loft Recording Studios (Bronxville, New York); The Lab (New York City, New York); The Studio (Philadelphia, Pennsylvania)
- Genre: Smooth jazz
- Length: 54:20
- Label: Capitol
- Producer: Evan Rogers; Carl Sturken; Jeff Lorber; Jeff Koz; Brian Culbertson; Brian McKnight; Dave Koz

Dave Koz chronology
Golden Slumbers: A Father's Lullaby (2002)	Saxophonic (2003)	Golden Slumbers: A Father's Love (2005)

Professional ratings
Review scores
Source	Rating
Allmusic	4/5 stars

Saxophonic is the seventh studio album by saxophone player Dave Koz. It was released by Capitol Records on October 7, 2003. The album peaked at number 2 on Billboard Jazz Albums chart.

== Track listing ==
No.	Title	Writer(s)	Length
1.	"Honey-Dipped (featuring Norman Brown)"	Dave Koz, Jeff Lorber	4:23
2.	"Love Changes Everything" (featuring Brian McKnight)	D.Koz, Evan Rogers, Carl Sturken	3:58
3.	"All I See Is You"	D.Koz, Brian Culbertson	4:14
4.	"Just to Be Next to You"	D.Koz, J.Koz	4:54
5.	"Let It Free"	D.Koz, J.Koz	3:48
6.	"Undeniable"	D.Koz, Lorber	4:13
7.	"Saxophonic (Come on Up)"	J.Koz, D.Koz	5:02
8.	"Definition of Beautiful" (featuring Javier)	D.Koz, Rogers, Sturken	4:56
9.	"Sound of the Underground " (featuring Chris Botti)	D.Koz, Rogers, Sturken, Lee Morgan	4:05
10.	"Only Tomorrow Knows"	D.Koz, Rogers, Sturken	5:07
11.	"I Believe"	D.Koz, J.Koz	5:31
12.	"A View from Above" (featuring Marc Antoine)	Culbertson, D.Koz	4:51
13.	"One Last Thing"	McKnight, D.Koz	3:35

== Personnel ==
- Dave Koz – alto saxophone (1, 2, 6, 7, 10, 11, 13), arrangements (1, 2, 4–6, 8–11), soprano saxophone (2, 4, 5, 7, 8, 10, 12), tenor saxophone (2, 3, 5, 7), horn arrangements (3), sax section (13)
- Jeff Lorber – Wurlitzer electric piano (1, 6), clavinet (1), additional keyboards (1, 6), electric guitar (1, 6), arrangements (1, 6)
- Carl Sturken – keyboards (2, 8–10), electric guitar (2), bass programming (2, 8–10), drum programming (2, 8–10), arrangements (2, 8–10), guitars (8), acoustic guitar (10)
- Brian Culbertson – keyboards (3, 12), synth bass (3), drum programming (3, 12), trombone (3), trumpet (3), arrangements (3, 12), horn arrangements (3), acoustic piano (12), sound effects (12)
- Jeff Koz – keyboards (4, 5, 7, 11), bass programming (4, 5, 7), drum programming (4, 5, 7), arrangements (4, 5, 7, 11), acoustic guitar (5), effects (7), nylon acoustic guitar (11)
- Brad Cole – acoustic piano (7), sax section arrangements (13)
- Charles Crawford – turntables (9), DJ effects (9)
- Norman Brown – guitar solo (1)
- Paul Jackson, Jr. – acoustic guitar (3), guitar pads (3), guitar effects (3)
- Tony Maiden – wah wah guitars (3), "funk" guitars (3), electric guitar (6)
- Michael Thompson – acoustic guitar (4, 5, 11, 12), electric guitar (4, 5, 7, 11, 12), guitar arrangements (4, 5, 7), guitar synthesizer (7), Ebow (12)
- Marc Antoine – nylon acoustic guitar solo (12)
- Alex Al – bass (1, 6), electric bass (3, 12)
- Nathan East – bass (4, 7), electric bass (11)
- John Robinson – drums (1, 6)
- Gary Novak – drums (7, 11)
- Lenny Castro – percussion (1, 4, 5, 7, 11)
- Bashiri Johnson – African percussion (12), vocal effects (12)
- Bill Reichenbach Jr. – trombone (1, 6)
- Jerry Hey – trumpet (1, 6), flugelhorn (1, 6), horn arrangements (1, 6)
- Chris Botti – trumpet (9)
- Evan Rogers – arrangements (2, 8–10), backing vocals (8), vocal effects (9), vocals (10), whistle (10)
- Larry Gold – string arrangements and conductor (8)
- Jennie Lorenzo – cello (8)
- Peter Nocella – viola (8)
- Gloria Justin – violin (8)
- Emma Kummrow – violin (8)
- Igor Szwec – violin (8)
- Brian McKnight – lead vocals (2), backing vocals (2, 13), acoustic piano (13)
- Bobby Caldwell – backing vocals (6)
- John Stoddart – vocal effects (7)
- Javier – lead and backing vocals (8)

Handclaps on "Honey-Dipped"

- Janice Dela Cruz, Lois Gleckman, Liz Healy, Hyman Katz, Audrey Koz, Dave Koz, Jeff Lorber, Gary Morris, Mel Pearlman and Mark Tungwarapotwitan

== Production ==
- Dave Koz – executive producer, producer (1, 3–7, 11), co-producer (2, 8–10)
- Jeff Lorber – producer (1, 6), recording (1, 6)
- Evan Rogers – producer (2, 8–10)
- Carl Sturken – producer (2, 8–10)
- Brian Culbertson – producer (3, 12), recording (3, 12)
- Jeff Koz – producer (4, 5, 7, 11), engineer (4, 5, 7, 11)
- Brian McKnight – producer (13)
- Dave Rideau – rhythm section recording (1, 6)
- Al Hemberger – recording (2, 8–10)
- Chris Wood – vocal recording (2), recording (13)
- Mary Ann Souza – vocal recording assistant (2), recording assistant (13)
- Dan Hart – engineer (4, 5, 7, 11)
- Frank Nadasdy – engineer (4, 5, 7, 11)
- Doug Rider – engineer (4, 5, 7, 11)
- Jeff Chestek – strings recording (8)
- John McGlinchey – strings recording assistant (8)
- Louis Alfred III – percussion recording (12)
- Brad Cole – sax section recording (13)
- Peter Morkran – mixing at Conway Studios (Hollywood, California)
- Tony Flores – mix assistant
- Seth Waldmann – mix assistant
- Steve Hall – mastering at Future Disc (Hollywood, California)
- Wendy Goldstein – A&R
- Natasha Bishop – project coordinator
- Andrea Derby – production coordinator
- Mary Fagot – art direction
- George Mimnaugh – design
- Elfie Semotan – photography
- W.F. Leopold Management, Inc. – management

== Charts ==
Chart (2003)	Peak position
Billboard 200	129
Jazz Albums	2
