= At the Movies (Dave Koz album) =

Studio album by Dave Koz
- Released: January 30, 2007
- Studio: Capitol Studios (Hollywood, California); Schnee Studios (North Hollywood, California); Paul Gilman Music (Palm Springs, California); Bennett Studios (Englewood, New Jersey); Right Track Recording, Avatar Studios and Sound On Sound (New York City, New York)
- Genre: Smooth jazz
- Length: 56:14
- Label: Capitol
- Producer: Phil Ramone

Dave Koz chronology
Golden Slumbers: A Father's Love (2005)	At the Movies (2007)	Memories of a Winter's Night (2007)

Professional ratings
Review scores
Source	Rating
Allmusic	3.5/5 stars

At the Movies is the eighth studio album by saxophone player Dave Koz. It was released by Capitol Records on January 30, 2007. The album peaked at number 2 on Billboard Jazz Albums chart.

== Track listing ==
No.	Title	Writer(s)	Music from	Length
1.	"Over the Rainbow"	Harold Arlen, E.Y. Harburg	The Wizard of Oz	4:02
2.	"Moon River" (featuring Barry Manilow)	Henry Mancini, Johnny Mercer	Breakfast at Tiffany's	3:47
3.	"As Time Goes By"	Herman Hupfeld	Casablanca	4:02
4.	"Somewhere" (featuring Anita Baker)	Leonard Bernstein, Stephen Sondheim	West Side Story	4:32
5.	"The Shadow of Your Smile" (featuring Johnny Mathis and Chris Botti)	Johnny Mandel, Paul Francis	The Sandpiper	5:22
6.	"The Pink Panther"	Mancini	The Pink Panther	3:38
7.	"The Way We Were" (featuring Vanessa Williams)	Alan Bergman, Marvin Hamlisch	The Way We Were	4:31
8.	"The Summer Knows"	A.Bergman, Marilyn Bergman, Michel Legrand	Summer of '42	4:55
9.	"It Might Be You" (featuring India.Arie)	A.Bergman, M.Bergman, Dave Grusin	Tootsie	4:23
10.	"Cinema Paradiso Suite"	Andrea Morricone, Ennio Morricone	Cinema Paradiso	4:16
11.	"A Whole New World" (featuring Donna Summer)	Alan Menken, Tim Rice	Aladdin	3:46
12.	"Schindler's List"	John Williams	Schindler's List	4:17

Bonus Track
No.	Title	Writer(s)	Music from	Length
13.	"It Might Be You [Instrumental]" (featuring Peter White)			4:00
14.	"The Shadow of Your Smile [Instrumental]" (featuring Chris Botti and Norman Brown)			4:38
15.	"Manusia Bodoh [Indonesian Bonus Track]" (ADA Band and Dave Koz)	Krishna Balagita & Donnie Sibarani	"Heaven of Love" (2004's ADA Band album)	5:16

== Personnel ==
- Dave Koz – alto saxophone (1, 2, 4, 7, 8, 10, 15), soprano saxophone (3, 6, 9, 11, 12), tenor saxophone (5)
- Rob Mounsey – acoustic piano (1, 5, 6, 9), arrangements (1, 5, 6, 9)
- Philippe Saisse – keyboards (1, 2, 5–7, 9, 11, 12)
- Rob Mathes – acoustic piano (2, 7, 11, 12), arrangements (2, 7, 11, 12)
- Jim Cox – keyboards (3, 4, 8, 10)
- Randy Waldman – acoustic piano (3, 8, 10), arrangements (3), Fender Rhodes (4), acoustic guitar (12)
- Barry Eastmond – acoustic piano (4)
- Krishna Balagita – keyboards (15), acoustic piano (15)
- Rodney Jones – guitars (1, 2, 5–7, 9, 11, 12)
- Jeff Mironov – guitars (1, 2, 5–7, 9, 11, 12)
- Dean Parks – acoustic guitar (3, 4, 8, 10)
- Michael Thompson – electric guitar (3, 4, 8, 10)
- Peter White – acoustic guitar (13)
- Norman Brown – electric guitar (14)
- Marshal S. Rachman – guitars (15)
- David Finck – bass (1, 2, 5–7, 9, 11, 12)
- Kevin Axt – bass (3, 4, 8, 10)
- Dika Satjadibrata – bass (15)
- Shawn Pelton – drums (1, 2, 5–7, 9, 11, 12)
- Greg Field – drums (3, 4, 8, 10)
- Rama Yaya Moektio – drums (15)
- Ken Hitchcock – alto saxophone (6)
- Roger Rosenberg – baritone saxophone (6)
- Charles Pillow – tenor saxophone (6)
- Andy Snitzer – tenor saxophone (6)
- George Flynn – bass trombone (6)
- Larry Farrell – tenor trombone (6)
- Birch Johnson – tenor trombone (6)
- Chris Botti – trumpet (5, 14)
- Jim Hynes – trumpet (6)
- Tony Kadleck – trumpet (6)
- Victor Vanacore – arrangements (4, 8, 10)
- Judy Garland – vocal introduction (1)
- Barry Manilow – vocals (2)
- Ingrid Bergman – spoken introduction (3)
- Anita Baker – vocals (4)
- Johnny Mathis – vocals (5)
- Vanessa Williams – vocals (7)
- India.Arie – vocals (9)
- Donna Summer – vocals (11)
- Donnie Sibarani – vocals (15)

=== Orchestra ===
- Rob Mounsey – conductor (1, 3–6, 8–10)
- Rob Mathes – conductor (2, 7, 11, 12)
- Jill Dell'Abate – contractor
- Elena Barere – concertmaster

Horns and Woodwinds

- Marc Goldberg and Ron Jannelli – bassoon
- John Manasse, David Mann and Charles Pillow – clarinet
- David Mann, Charles Pillow and Pamela Sklar – flute
- Diane Lesser – oboe
- Diane Lesser and Bill Meredith – English horn
- Joseph Anderer, Julie Landsman, Patrick Milando, Stewart Rose and Anne Schraer – French horn
- Chris Hall – tuba

Strings

- Diane Barare, Jeanne LeBlanc, Richard Locker, Eugene Moye and Ellen Westerman – cello
- Larry Glazener and Gail Kruvand-Moye – double bass
- Stacey Shames – harp
- Adria Benjamin, Crystal Garner, Vincent Leonti, Craig Mumm, Maxine Roach and Judy Witmer – viola
- Abe Appleman, Avril Brown, David Chan, Cenovia Cummins, Jonathan Dinklage, Katherine Fong, Jean Ingraham, Ann Leathers, Ann Lehmann, Laura McGinnis, Jan Mullen, Richard Sortomme, Marti Sweet and Yuri Vodovoz – violin

Percussion

- Jim Saporito – percussion
- Joe Passaro – timpani

== Production ==
- Sue Drew – A&R
- Phil Ramone – producer, liner notes
- Frank Filipetti – recording
- Dave O'Donnell – recording
- Al Schmitt – recording, mixing
- David Benson – additional engineer
- Bruce Feagle – additional engineer
- Jan Folkson – additional engineer
- Michael O'Reilly – additional engineer
- Bill Schnee – additional engineer
- Darius Fong – assistant engineer, Pro Tools operator
- Justin Shturtz – assistant engineer
- Angie Teo – assistant engineer
- Tim Whitney – assistant engineer
- Steve Genewick – mix assistant
- Bill Smith – mix assistant
- Andrew Felluss – Pro Tools operator
- Sangwook Nam – mastering
- Doug Sax – mastering
- The Mastering Lab (Ojai, California) – mastering location
- Jill Dell'Abate – production manager
- Eric Roinestad – art direction, design
- Megan Steinman – art direction
- Ellen Von Unwerth – photography
- Dave Koz – liner notes
- W.F. Leopold Management, Inc. – management

== Charts ==
Chart (2007)	Peak position
Billboard 200	86
Jazz Albums	2
