= Off the Beaten Path (Dave Koz album) =

Studio album by Dave Koz
- Released: August 20, 1996 (US, Japan, and UK); August 1, 1997 (international)
- Recorded: 1995–1996
- Studio: Groove Masters (Santa Monica, California); A&M Studios (Hollywood, California); House of Blues Studio (Encino, California)
- Genre: Smooth jazz
- Length: 57:34
- Label: Capitol
- Producer: Thom Panunzio; Jeff Koz; Dave Koz

Dave Koz chronology
Lucky Man (1993)	Off the Beaten Path (1996)	December Makes Me Feel This Way (1997)

Professional ratings
Review scores
Source	Rating
Allmusic	3/5 stars

Off the Beaten Path is the third studio album by saxophone player Dave Koz. It was released by Capitol Records on August 20, 1996. Koz himself provides vocals on "That's the Way I Feel About You."

== Track listing ==
No.	Title	Writer(s)	Length
1.	"Don't Look Back"	Dave Koz, Jeff Koz	4:07
2.	"I'm Ready"	D. Koz	4:37
3.	"Wake Up Call"	D. Koz, Evan Rogers, Carl Sturken	4:52
4.	"Let Me Count the Ways"	D. Koz, Rogers, Sturken	4:20
5.	"Follow Me Home"	D. Koz, Ron Cohen	5:44
6.	"Awakenings"	D. Koz, J. Koz	3:34
7.	"Flat Feet"	D. Koz, Jeff Lorber, J. Koz	3:50
8.	"Lullaby for a Rainy Night"	D. Koz	4:56
9.	"That's the Way I Feel About You"	Jud J. Friedman, Allan Rich, D. Koz	4:41
10.	"Leave the Light On"	D. Koz, J. Koz	4:09
11.	"Under the Spell of the Moon"	D. Koz, J. Lorber	4:50
12.	"My Back Porch"	D. Koz, J. Koz	5:13
13.	"Remembrance"	D. Koz, Iianti Erningpraja	2:41

== Personnel ==
- Dave Koz – alto saxophone (1, 2, 5, 7, 9), baritone saxophone (2), tenor saxophone (2, 10, 13), soprano saxophone (4, 6, 8, 11–13), vocals (9), acoustic piano (13)
- Jim Cox – Hammond B3 organ (1, 2, 5, 8), Wurlitzer electric piano (2, 11)
- Brian Mann – accordion (1, 4–7)
- Jamie Muhoberac – keyboards (2, 4)
- Chester Thompson – Hammond B3 organ (3, 12)
- Jeff Koz – acoustic guitar (1, 4, 5, 7, 9, 10, 12), classical guitar (1, 4), lead guitar (4)
- Gregg Arreguin – electric guitar (1, 4, 5, 7–12), acoustic guitar (2, 3), lead guitar (12)
- Tim Pierce – electric guitar (1–3, 5, 10–12), mandolin (1, 5), slide guitar (3), baritone guitar (4), classical guitar (4, 8), 12-string guitar (5), dobro (7), acoustic guitar (8, 9, 11)
- Greg Leisz – lap steel guitar (2, 11), lead guitar (10)
- Leo Kottke – acoustic guitar (6)
- David Piltch – electric bass (1, 2, 5, 11), bass (3), acoustic bass (8, 10), bass percussion (10)
- John Pierce – electric bass (4, 7, 9, 12)
- Mark Schulman – drums (1–3, 5, 8, 10, 11)
- Kenny Aronoff – drums (4, 7, 9)
- Lenny Castro – percussion (1–3, 8, 10), djembe (1)
- Brian Kilgore – snare drum (5), bass drum (5), chimes (5), maracas (7), vibraphone (8), percussion (11), congas (12), tambourine (12), washboard (12)
- Gary Herbig – baritone saxophone (3), tenor saxophone (3)
- Nick Lane – trombone (3)
- Greg Adams – trumpet (3), horn arrangements (3)
- Chuck Findley – trumpet (3)
- Phil Ayling – tin whistle (5)
- Sid Page – fiddle (5)
- Larry Corbett – cello (6)
- Tollak Ollestad – harmonica (12)
- Sharon Celani – backing vocals (4)
- Stevie Nicks – backing vocals (4)
- Sweet Pea Atkinson – backing vocals (10, 12)
- Sir Harry Bowens – backing vocals (10, 12)
- Jim Gilstrap – backing vocals (10, 12)
- Arnold McCuller – backing vocals (10, 12)
- Kipp Lennon – backing vocals (11)
- Mark Lennon – backing vocals (11)

== Production ==
- Bruce Lundvall – executive producer
- Dave Koz – producer, arrangements
- Jeff Koz – producer, arrangements
- Thom Panunzio – producer, mixing, recording (1–12)
- Bob Salcedo – recording (13), assistant engineer
- John Aguto – assistant engineer
- Howard Willing – assistant engineer
- Steve Hall – mastering at Future Disc (Hollywood, California)
- Shelly Haber – career direction
- Leanne Meyers – career direction
- Valerie Pack – production coordinator
- Tommy Steele – art direction, design
- Lisa Peardon – photography
- Vision Management – management company

Enhanced CD credits

- Lou Beach – producer, graphic design
- Richard D'Andrea – producer, graphic design, programming
- Chris Silagyi – producer, graphic design, engineer

== Charts ==
Chart (1996)	Peak position
Billboard 200	182
Top Contemporary Jazz Albums	3

== See also ==
- Larry Carlton
