= December Makes Me Feel This Way =

Studio album by Dave Koz
- Released: September 23, 1997
- Studio: Groove Masters (Santa Monica, California); House of Blues Studio (Encino, California); Studio Seven (Hollywood, California)
- Genre: Smooth jazz, Christmas
- Length: 48:07
- Label: Capitol
- Producer: Dave Koz; Thom Panunzio

Dave Koz chronology
Off the Beaten Path (1996)	December Makes Me Feel This Way (1997)	The Dance (1999)

Professional ratings
Review scores
Source	Rating
Allmusic	2/5 stars

December Makes Me Feel This Way is the fourth studio album by saxophone player Dave Koz. Koz's first holiday album was released by Capitol Records on September 23, 1997. Koz provided vocals on album title track "December Makes Me Feel This Way." The album peaked at #2 on Billboard's Top Contemporary Jazz Albums chart.

== Track listing ==
No.	Title	Writer(s)	Length
1.	"Sleigh Ride"	Leroy Anderson	3:20
2.	"Have Yourself a Merry Little Christmas"	Ralph Blane, Hugh Martin	3:18
3.	"Winter Wonderland"	Felix Bernard, Richard B. Smith	2:56
4.	"White Christmas"	Irving Berlin	3:17
5.	"Santa Claus Is Coming to Town"	J. Fred Coots, Haven Gillespie	2:54
6.	"The Christmas Song"	Mel Tormé, Robert Wells	3:01
7.	"I'll Be Home for Christmas"	Walter Kent, Kim Gannon	4:08
8.	"Little Drummer Boy"	Katherine K. Davis, Henry Onorati, Harry Simeone	3:40
9.	"December Makes Me Feel This Way" (featuring Victoria Shaw)	Dave Koz, Jud Friedman, Allan Rich	3:22
10.	"Silver Bells"	Jay Livingston, Ray Evans	3:50
11.	"Eight Candles (A Song for Hanukkah)"	Koz, Phil Parlapiano	3:31
12.	"O Tannenbaum"	Public Domain	3:49
13.	"Auld Lang Syne"	Public Domain	6:55

== Personnel ==
- Dave Koz – alto saxophone, baritone saxophone, soprano saxophone, tenor saxophone, keyboards, acoustic piano, vocals (9)
- Phil Parlapiano – keyboards, acoustic piano, Wurlitzer electric piano, Hammond B3 organ, pump organ, Mellotron, celesta, accordion, acoustic guitar, mandolin
- Doug Pettibone – acoustic guitar, electric guitar, bass guitar
- Bruce Watson – acoustic guitar, electric guitar, slide guitar, lap steel guitar, mandolin, harmonica
- Jeff Koz – nylon guitar (5)
- David Piltch – acoustic bass
- Stephen Théard – drums, percussion, bells, trash cans
- Lisa Haley – fiddle (11)
- Victoria Shaw – backing vocals
- Phil Hartman – narrator

== Production ==
- Bruce Lundvall – executive producer
- Dave Koz – producer, arrangements
- Thom Panunzio – producer, engineer, mixing
- David Bryant – assistant engineer
- Nick Els – assistant engineer
- Bob Salcedo – assistant engineer
- John Aguto – mix assistant
- Steve Hall – mastering at Future Disc (Hollywood, California)
- Valerie Pack – production coordinator
- Jeffrey Fey – art direction, design
- Tommy Steele – art direction
- Robert Zuckerman – photography
- Vision Management – management

== Charts ==
Chart (1997)	Position
Billboard Top Contemporary Jazz Albums	2
