= A Smooth Jazz Christmas =

Studio album by Dave Koz & Friends
- Released: September 25, 2001
- Recorded: April – May 2001
- Studio: Capitol Studios (Hollywood, California)
- Genre: Smooth jazz, Christmas
- Length: 60:32
- Label: Capitol
- Producer: Dave Koz

Dave Koz & Friends chronology
The Dance (1999)	A Smooth Jazz Christmas (2001)	Golden Slumbers: A Father's Lullaby (2002)

Professional ratings
Review scores
Source	Rating
Allmusic	4.5/5 stars

A Smooth Jazz Christmas is the sixth studio album by saxophone player Dave Koz. Koz's second holiday album was released by Capitol Records on September 25, 2001. Features include David Benoit, Rick Braun, Kenny Loggins, Brenda Russell, and Peter White.

== Track listing ==
No.	Title	Writer(s)	Length
1.	"Smooth Jazz Christmas Overture"		8:30
2.	"The Christmas Song"	Mel Torme, Robert Wells	4:54
3.	"O Tannenbaum/Sleigh Ride Medley"	Public Domain/Leroy Anderson	4:03
4.	"Silent Night" (featuring Peter White)	Public Domain	4:34
5.	"Beneath the Moonlit Sky" (featuring David Benoit)	Dave Koz, David Benoit	3:04
6.	"Little Drummer Boy" (featuring Rick Braun)	Katherine K. Davis, Henry Onorati, Harry Simeone	4:26
7.	"Hark! The Herald Angels Sing" (featuring David Benoit)	Public Domain	4:09
8.	"December Makes Me Feel This Way" (featuring Kenny Loggins)	Koz, Judd Friedman, Alan Rich	3:37
9.	"Boogie Woogie Santa Claus" (featuring Brenda Russell)	Leon Rene	3:19
10.	"Have Yourself a Merry Little Christmas" (featuring Peter White)	Ralph Blane, Hugh Martin	3:47
11.	"White Christmas" (featuring Brenda Russell, David Benoit)	Irving Berlin	3:20
12.	"Eight Candles (A Song for Hanukkah)"	Koz, Phil Parlapiano	3:35
13.	"Get Here (For the Holidays)" (featuring Brenda Russell)	Brenda Russell	4:58
14.	"'Twas the Night Before Christmas"	Koz, Rick Braun, Benoit, Peter White, Russell	3:57

== Personnel ==
Musicians and Vocalists

- Dave Koz – alto saxophone, soprano saxophone, tenor saxophone, narrator (14)
- Brian Simpson – keyboards, acoustic piano
- David Benoit – acoustic piano, musical director, narrator (14)
- Peter White – accordion, acoustic guitars, narrator (14)
- Paul Jackson Jr. – electric guitars
- Bill Sharpe – bass
- Stevo Théard – drums
- Brian Kilgore – percussion
- Nick Lane – bass trombone, tenor trombone
- Rick Braun – trumpet, flugelhorn, narrator (14)
- Brenda Russell – vocals (1, 9, 11, 13), narrator (14)
- Kenny Loggins – vocals (8)
- Bridgette Bryant – backing vocals
- Esterlee Nicholson – backing vocals
- Sandy Simmons – backing vocals

Handclaps

- Rick Braun, Mike Glines, John Hendrickson, Dave Koz, Julian Raymond, Paula Salvatore, Maggie Sikkens and Michael White

=== Production ===
- Roy Lott – executive producer
- Dave Koz – producer
- Al Schmitt – recording, mixing
- Stephan Oberhoff – vocal producer and recording for Brenda Russell
- John Hendrickson – additional engineer
- Steve Genewick – assistant engineer
- Jimmy Hoyson – assistant engineer
- Doug Sax – mastering at The Mastering Lab (Hollywood, California)
- Steve Schuer – A&R
- Yvonne Wish – project coordinator
- Jeffrey Fey – art direction, design
- Tommy Steele – art direction
- Sam Jones – photography
- Lester Cohen – wire image photography (pg. 4)
- Lisa Oliver – stylist
- W.F. Leopold Management – management

== Charts ==
Chart (2001)	Peak position
The Billboard 200	140
Top Jazz Albums	3
