= Dana Glover =

American pop singer and songwriter

- Genres: Gospel, pop
- Occupations: Singer, songwriter
- Instruments: Vocals, piano
- Years active: 2001–2003
- Label: DreamWorks Records

Dana Glover is a pop singer and songwriter, known for performing film songs.

In 2001, she recorded, for the film The Wedding Planner, the song "Plan On Forever"—a duet with the film's composer, Mervyn Warren. Later that year, she recorded her song "It Is You (I Have Loved)" for the film Shrek. Then the late Robbie Robertson introduced her to Matthew Wilder. Wilder produced her debut album, Testimony, which reached #43 on the UK Albums Chart.

== Discography ==
=== Albums ===
| Album | Statistics | Singles |
|---|---|---|
| Testimony | Released: October 15, 2002; Peak chart positions; #43 UK Chart; #41 Billboard Heatseakers | Singles released: "Thinking Over"; "Rain" |

=== Singles ===
| Year | Single | Album | US AC | US Hot AC | UK Singles Chart |
|---|---|---|---|---|---|
| 2002 | "Thinking Over" | Testimony | 17 | 22 | 38 |
| 2003 | "Rain" | Testimony | - | 30 | - |
| 2003 | "It Is You (I Have Loved)" | Shrek Soundtrack | - | - | - |
