= List of Billboard Smooth Jazz Airplay number-ones of the 2020s =

Billboard Smooth Jazz Airplay number-ones by decade

List of Billboard Smooth Jazz Airplay number-ones of the 2020s.

No.	Initial peak entry	Artist(s)	Title	Weeks	Ref.
2019
217	December 14	Kayla Waters	"Full Bloom"	6	
2020
218	January 25	Lisa Addeo	"Listen to This"	1	
219	February 1	Paul Hardcastle	"Dancing Galaxies"	2	
220	February 15	Blake Aaron	"Fall for You"	1	
221	February 22	Jacob Webb featuring Stantawn Kendrick	"Details"	4	
222	March 21	Chris Standring	"Is There a Doctor in the House?"	4	
223	April 18	Paula Atherton	"Can You Feel It"	3	
224	May 9	Darren Rahn	"Infinite Love"	1	
225	May 16	Brian Culbertson featuring Mr. TalkBox and Marcus Anderson	"Get Up!"	1	
226	May 23	Boney James	"Solid"	1	
227	May 30	Nick Colionne	"Let's Get Serious"	3	
228	June 20	Kim Scott featuring Jazmin Ghent	"Free to Be"	1	
229	June 27	Cindy Bradley	"Snack Grouch"	2	
230	July 11	Oli Silk featuring Vincent Ingala	"New Bounce"	3	
231	August 1	Alex Parchment featuring Phillip Doc Martin	"Vibin' in Time"	1	
232	August 8	Nils Jiptner	"Caught in the Groove"	1	
233	August 15	Paul Hardcastle	"Latitude"	1	
234	August 22	Brian Culbertson featuring Everette Harp	"Keep Movin'"	1	
235	August 29	Chris Standring	"Shake You Up"	1	
236	September 5	Julian Vaughn featuring Elan Trotman	"Afternoon Delight"	2	
237	September 12	Euge Groove	"Dirty Dozen"	1	
238	September 26	Willie Bradley featuring Ragan Whiteside	"It's on Now"	1	
239	October 3	Lin Rountree	"Fluid"	1	
240	October 10	Randy Scott	"Joy Ride"	1	
241	October 17	Boney James	"Full Effect"	2	
242	October 31	Adam Hawley featuring Rick Braun	"Escape"	3	
243	November 21	Nils Jiptner	"Outta Sight"	1	
244	November 28	Dave Koz featuring David Sanborn	"Side by Side"	4	
245	December 26	Gerald Albright	"Better Days Ahead"	4	
2021
246	January 23	Skinny Hightower	"Blue Moon"	1	
247	January 30	Riley Richard	"Don't Wanna Let Go"	3	
248	February 20	Freddie Fox	"Too Tuff"	1	
249	February 27	Sean U featuring Blake Aaron	"Magic Hour"	1	
250	March 6	JJ Sansaverino	"Style and Elegance"	1	
251	March 13	Paul Brown featuring Jeff Ryan	"Nothin' but Love"	2	
252	March 27	Willie Bradley featuring James Lloyd	"It's My Time"	1	
253	April 3	Patrick Bradley	"Exhale"	1	
254	April 10	Paul Hardcastle	"Welcome to the Beach"	2	
255	April 24	Julian Vaughn	"Sway"	1	
256	May 1	Dave Koz featuring Paul Jackson Jr.	"Dr. Norm"	2	
257	May 15	Norman Brown	"Just Groovin'"	2	
258	May 29	Oli Silk	"Hurry Up and Wait"	1	
259	June 5	Jazmin Ghent	"Kickin It Up"	1	
260	June 12	Blake Aaron featuring Najee	"Sunday Strut"	1	
261	June 19	Tim Bowman	"Fireball"	1	
262	June 26	Gerald Albright	"Hope"	2	
263	July 10	Randy Scott	"Affection"	1	
264	July 17	Greg Manning	"Sunrise Boulevard"	1	
265	July 24	Skinny Hightower	"Now or Never"	1	
266	July 31	Ben Tankard	"Just like Music"	1	
267	August 7	Jeff Ryan	"Sentimental Soul"	1	
268	August 14	Jonathan Fritzén	"Keys to Paradise"	1	
269	August 21	Paula Atherton featuring Nathan Mitchell	"Summer Song"	2	
270	September 4	Lin Rountree	"Release"	1	
271	September 11	Steve Cole	"Living Out Loud"	1	
272	September 18	Darren Rahn	"Midnight Sun"	1	
273	September 25	Andy Snitzer	"Non Stop"	1	
274	October 2	Nick Colionne	"Right Around the Corner"	1	
275	October 9	Vincent Ingala	"On the Move"	2	
276	October 23	Paul Hardcastle	"Tropicool"	1	
277	October 30	Adam Hawley	"Risin' Up"	1	
278	November 6	Kayla Waters	"Open Portals"	1	
279	November 13	Christian de Mesones featuring Bob James	"Hispanica"	1	
280	November 20	Blake Aaron	"Feels So Right"	1	
281	November 27	The Saxtress Pamela Williams featuring Gerald Albright	"Serendipity"	1	
282	December 4	Paul Taylor	"Straight to the Point"	2	
283	December 11	Kim Scott featuring Althea Rene and Ragan Whiteside	"I'm Every Woman"	1	
284	December 25	Boney James	"Sundance"	1	
2022
285	January 1	Randy Scott featuring Cindy Bradley	"Daydreams"	1	
286	January 8	Phil Denny	"Urban Troubadour"	2	
287	January 22	Gerald Albright	"Crazy"	2	
288	February 5	Dave Koz	"The Closer We Get"	1	
289	February 12	Jacob Webb featuring Jazmin Ghent	"Nothing Better"	2	
290	February 19	Le Sonic featuring Robert Lee	"Any Moment"	1	
291	March 5	Nicholas Cole featuring Julian Vaughn	"Feelings"	1	
292	March 12	Judah Sealy	"Stylish"	1	
293	March 19	Chris Standring	"Change the World"	1	
294	March 26	Oli Silk	"Out to Lunch"	2	
295	April 9	Paul Hardcastle featuring Rock Hendricks	"Wavelength"	1	
296	April 16	Ryan La Valette	"Let It Flow"	1	
297	April 23	Nick Colionne	"What You Do to Me"	3	
298	May 14	Vincent Ingala	"Shadow Dancer"	3	
299	June 4	Gerald Albright	"G Wiggle"	1	
300	June 11	Richard Elliot	"Move Ahead"	2	
301	June 25	Eric Valentine featuring Everette Harp and Greg Manning	"Q's Vibe"	1	
302	July 2	Blake Aaron	"Dreamland"	1	
303	July 9	The Braxton Brothers	"Catalina Nights"	2	
304	July 23	Marcus Anderson featuring Darnell "Showcase" Taylor	"Soul Ties"	2	
305	August 6	Paul Taylor	"Friday@5"	1	
306	August 13	Ragan Whiteside	"Thrill Ride"	1	
307	August 20	Dave Koz featuring Brian McKnight	"Summertime in NYC"	1	
308	August 27	Cindy Bradley	"Drive"	2	
309	September 10	Jeffery Smith	"Jazz Party"	1	
310	September 17	Paul Brown	"Secret Sauce"	2	
311	September 24	Ryan La Valette	"Highway 10"	1	
312	October 1	Boney James featuring Dontae Winslow	"Bring It Back"	1	
313	October 15	Le Sonic featuring Lauran Beluzo and Robert Lee	"I'll Be the One"	1	
314	October 22	Adam Hawley featuring Vincent Ingala	"Let's Get Down Tonight"	2	
315	November 5	Carol Albert featuring Paul Brown	"Paradigm Shift"	1	
316	November 12	Lemek	"Co-Motion"	4	
317	December 10	Will Donato	"Good on You"	3	
318	December 17	Quintin Gerard W. featuring Michael Broening	"Broken Promises"	1	
2023
319	January 7	Mindi Abair	"Nothing Ever Hurt like You"	1	
320	January 14	Michael Broening	"Let It Breathe"	4	
321	February 11	Candy Dulfer featuring Nile Rodgers	"Convergency"	1	
322	February 18	Bobby Lyle featuring Nathan East	"Nujazzy"	5	
323	March 18	Pamela Williams	"Stone Cold"	1	
324	April 1	Jimmy B.	"It's Personal"	1	
325	April 8	Ryan La Valette featuring Nicholas Cole	"Lovers Melody"	5	
326	May 13	Nick Colionne	"Just like That"	1	
327	May 20	Lemek featuring Ryan La Valette	"Groove Central"	5	
328	May 27	Nathan Mitchell featuring Marcus Anderson	"100% Cotton"	1	
329	July 1	Quintin Gerard W.	"On a Roll"	3	
330	July 22	Jackiem Joyner	"Missing You"	2	
331	August 5	Tim Bowman	"Easy"	2	
332	August 19	Michael Broening featuring Marion Meadows	"Talk to Me"	1	
333	August 26	Damien Escobar	"Taboo"	2	
334	September 9	Lin Rountree featuring Ryan La Valette	"Solid"	1	
335	September 16	Mo Louis	"Static"	1	
336	September 23	Ryan La Valette featuring Chris 'Big Dog' Davis	"Closer to You"	5	
337	October 28	Phylicia Rae featuring Gerald Albright	"On My Way"	1	
338	November 4	Roberto Restuccia featuring Michael Broening	"1979"	2	
339	November 18	Adam Hawley	"Uptop"	2	
340	December 2	Michael Lington	"South Bay"	7	
341	December 9	Randy Scott	"Twilight"	2	
2024
342	February 3	Ellis Hamilton	"My Heart to Yours"	1	
343	February 10	Slim Gambill	"Light This Candle"	4	
344	March 9	Jonathan Butler	"Bon Appetit"	3	
345	March 30	Lawson Rollins featuring Shahin Shahida	"After Twilight"	1	
346	April 6	Cindy Bradley	"Promise"	1	
347	April 13	Blake Aaron	"She's the One"	1	
348	April 20	Big Mike Hart featuring Boney James	"Cigar Lounge"	3	
349	April 27	Quintin Gerard W.	"Tell Me Something"	1	
350	May 18	Michael Broening	"The Way She Moves"	1	
351	May 25	Tim Bowman	"Ocean Breeze"	1	
352	June 1	Norman Brown	"Anything"	5	
353	June 22	Le Sonic featuring Lauran Beluzo	"Take It or Leave It"	1	
354	July 13	Carol Albert featuring Peter White	"Sunshine Yellow"	2	
355	July 27	Gerald Albright	"Full Throttle"	3	
356	August 17	The TNR Collective	"Hypnotized"	1	
357	August 24	Lisa Addeo	"Diamond Dress"	2	
358	September 7	Special EFX featuring Chieli Minucci	"Cool Summer"	2	
359	September 21	Gregory Goodloe	"Groovin' On"	2	
360	October 5	Randy Scott featuring Bill Moio	"Embrace"	1	
361	October 12	Vincent Ingala	"Movin' and Shakin'"	2	
362	October 26	Nicholas Cole	"Brown Sugar"	1	
363	November 2	Richard Elliot	"Very Delicious"	1	
364	November 9	Elan Trotman	"Runnin' Hot"	3	
365	November 30	Jazmin Ghent	"Upgrade"	1	
366	December 7	Boney James	"Slide"	3	
367	December 14	Michael Broening	"Happy Hour"	2	
368	December 21	Dave Koz and Adam Hawley	"Automatic"	2	
2025
369	January 25	Ryan La Valette	"Daydreaming"	3	
370	February 15	Les Sabler	"Patches' Groove"	1	
371	February 22	Cindy Bradley	"A Little Moxie"	2	
372	March 8	Mark Jaimes	"Wheels in Motion"	1	
373	March 15	Carol Albert	"Seaside Story"	1	
374	March 22	Nathan Mitchell featuring Chelsey Green	"So in Love with You"	1	
375	March 29	Donald Hayes featuring Nathan East	"Longing for You"	2	
376	April 12	Blake Aaron	"Let's Get Lost"	3	
377	May 3	Chris Standring	"Top Hat & Tails"	2	
378	May 17	Adam Hawley featuring Judah Sealy	"Absolute Love"	1	
379	May 24	Special EFX featuring Chieli Minucci	"Meant to Be"	1	
380	May 31	Vincent Ingala	"Let's Get to It"	3	
381	June 21	Lin Rountree	"So Naturally"	2	
382	July 5	Richard Elliot	"Straight Up Down"	1	
383	July 12	Mindi Abair	"Oooh-Aah (Catalina)"	1	
384	July 19	Ryan La Valette	"Release Me"	2	
385	August 2	Nicholas Cole	"Blue Magic"	3	
386	August 16	Eric Darius	"Too Good 2 Let Go"	2	
387	September 6	Michael Broening	"Together Again"	1	
388	September 13	Gerald Albright	"Living My Best Life"	2	
389	September 27	3rd Force	"Show Me the Way"	2	
390	October 11	Roberto Restuccia	"De Nada"	1	
391	October 18	Brian Culbertson featuring Marcus Miller and Sheila E.	"On the Road"	2	
392	November 1	Nathan Mitchell featuring Patrick Bryant and Mo'Horns	"Feel the Heat"	1	
393	November 8	Adrian Crutchfield	"Sooo Good"	3	
394	November 29	Blake Aaron	"Dare to Fly"	1	
395	December 6	Ryan La Valette	"London Nights"	3	
396	December 13	Boney James	"The Bounce"	1	
2026
397	January 3	Nicholas Cole	"Shine"	3	
398	January 24	Adam Hawley	"RollerSk8"	3	
399	February 14	Richard Elliot	"Driftin'"	1	
400	February 21	Althea Rene featuring Jordan Love	"Synergy"	2	
401	February 28	Byron Miller featuring Ragan Whiteside	"Any Time, Any Place"	1	
402	March 14	3rd Force	"Onward and Upward"	1	
403	March 21	Rick Braun featuring Tom Scott	"Give It All You Got"	2	
404	April 4	WaKaNa	"After Hours"	1	
405	April 11	Jeff Ryan	"Speakeasy"	2	
406	April 25	The TNR Collective	"Colors"	1	
407	May 2	Carol Albert	"City Walk"	2	
408	May 16	Gerald Albright	"More Than Enough"	2	
409	May 30	Phylicia Rae	"Take Your Time"	2	
410	June 13	Adam Hawley featuring Everette Harp	"Electric"	2	
411	June 27	Kim Scott	"Hide & Seek"	2	
412	July 11	Najee and Will Downing	"Catch a Feelin'"	1	
413	July 18	David Benoit and Jeff Lorber	"Boarding Pass"	1	
414	July 25	Nils	"Joy and Pain"	1	
415	August 1	Adrian Crutchfield featuring Nicholas Cole	"Hypnotic"	2	
416	August 15	Bob Baldwin	"HEPnotic (Hep Is the New Hip)"	1	
417	August 22	Nicholas Cole	"Green Light"	1	
418	August 29	Eric Darius	"Maputo Nights"	2	
419	September 12	Ragan Whiteside	"In Love: Reimagined"	1	
420	September 19	Greg Manning featuring Kirk Whalum	"Jolanda"	1	
421	September 26	Oli Silk featuring Jeff Ryan	"Yessir!"	1	
422	October 3	Euge Groove	"The Phoenix"	3	
423	October 24	Carol Albert	"Vertical Horizon"	1	
424	October 31	Evan Taylor featuring Dave Koz	"Skate On"	1	
425	November 7	Adam Hawley featuring Jeff Ryan	"Power Move"	1	
426	November 14	Boney James featuring Larry Carlton	"Storybook"	2	
427	November 28	BPM: Brian Bromberg, Paul Brown and Michael Paulo	"Gridlock"	1	

== See also ==
- 2020s in music
