= List of smooth jazz musicians =

The following artists and bands have performed smooth jazz.

== Saxophonists ==
- Mindi Abair
- Gerald Albright
- Paula Atherton
- Gato Barbieri
- Walter Beasley
- Tom Colclough
- Steve Cole
- Eric Darius
- Will Donato
- Candy Dulfer
- Richard Elliot
- Kenny G
- Euge Groove
- Everette Harp
- Warren Hill
- George Howard
- Vincent Ingala
- Jessy J
- Boney James
- Jackiem Joyner
- Jeff Kashiwa
- Grace Kelly
- John Klemmer
- Kaori Kobayashi
- Dave Koz
- Ronnie Laws
- Michael Lington
- Eric Marienthal
- Stu Matthewman
- Marion Meadows
- Najee
- Fausto Papetti
- Michael Paulo
- Courtney Pine
- Art Porter
- Bobby Ricketts
- Nelson Rangell
- David Sanborn
- Tom Scott
- Arturo Tappin
- Paul Taylor
- Grover Washington, Jr.
- Sadao Watanabe
- Kim Waters
- Kirk Whalum
- Pamela Williams

== Guitarists ==
- Marc Antoine
- Armik
- Roni Benise
- George Benson
- Tim Bowman
- Zachary Breaux
- Norman Brown
- Jonathan Butler
- Larry Carlton
- Craig Chaquico
- Jesse Cook
- Joyce Cooling
- Al Di Meola
- Kevin Eubanks
- Russ Freeman
- Frank Gambale
- Jeff Golub
- Adam Hawley
- Brian Hughes
- Paul Jackson, Jr.
- Ronny Jordan
- Stanley Jordan
- Ryo Kawasaki
- Gideon King
- Earl Klugh
- Ludwik Konopko
- Michael Landau
- Ottmar Liebert
- Johannes Linstead
- Chuck Loeb
- Pat Metheny
- Chieli Minucci
- Ken Navarro
- Ray Obiedo
- Steve Oliver
- Gil Parris
- Doc Powell
- Lee Ritenour
- Neal Schon
- Agboola Shadare
- Shahin and Sepehr
- Craig Sharmat
- Jay Soto
- Chris Standring
- Alan Steward
- Roberto Tola
- Peter White
- Bernie Williams
- Patrick Yandall

== Pianists/Keyboardists ==
- Bob Baldwin
- David Benoit
- Alex Bugnon
- Brian Culbertson
- Eumir Deodato
- Terry Disley
- George Duke
- Ronnie Foster
- Rodney Franklin
- Jonathan Fritzén
- Chris Geith
- Tom Grant
- Dave Grusin
- Paul Hardcastle
- Gene Harris
- Alan Hewitt
- Skinny Hightower
- Bob James
- Bradley Joseph
- Gregg Karukas
- Kenny Kirkland
- David Lanz
- Elliot Levine
- Ramsey Lewis
- Jeff Lorber
- Erik van der Luijt
- Bobby Lyle
- Keiko Matsui
- Jimmy McGriff
- Duncan Millar
- Yuriko Nakamura
- Freddie Ravel
- Paolo Rustichelli
- Philippe Saisse
- Joe Sample
- Bill Sharpe
- Dan Shea
- Dan Siegel
- Oli Silk
- Brian Simpson
- Lonnie Liston Smith
- Alan Steward
- Tonéx (vocalist)
- Ben Tankard
- John Tesh
- Kevin Toney
- Reuben Wilson

== Drummers and other percussionists ==
- Roy Ayers
- Vinnie Colaiuta
- Paulinho da Costa
- Leonard Gibbs
- Omar Hakim
- Skinny Hightower
- Akira Jimbo
- Steve Jordan
- Harvey Mason
- Alphonse Mouzon
- Cal Tjader
- Dave Weckl
- Gota Yashiki

== Bassists ==
- Brian Bromberg
- Stanley Clarke
- Nathan East
- Skinny Hightower
- Paul Jackson (bassist)
- Abraham Laboriel
- Marcus Miller
- Wayman Tisdale
- Gerald Veasley
- Leroy Vinnegar

== Trumpeters / Flugelhornists ==
- Greg Adams
- Herb Alpert
- Chris Botti
- Cindy Bradley
- Rick Braun
- Randy Brecker
- Tom Browne
- Jerry Hey
- David Longoria
- Chuck Mangione
- Hugh Masekela
- Lin Rountree

== Flutists ==
- Brian Dunning
- Bobbi Humphrey
- Hubert Laws
- Najee
- Nelson Rangell
- Nestor Torres
- Dave Valentin
- Alexander Zonjic

== Bands/Groups ==
- 3rd Force
- Acoustic Alchemy
- BWB
- Carmel
- Count Basic
- The Crusaders
- Curiosity Killed the Cat
- Dancing Fantasy
- Down to the Bone
- Fattburger
- Fourplay
- Four80East
- Haircut One Hundred
- The Headhunters
- Heavyshift
- Hiroshima
- Incognito
- Liquid Soul
- Matt Bianco
- Mezzoforte
- The Microscopic Septet
- Opafire
- Physical Therapy
- Pieces of a Dream
- Praful
- The Rippingtons
- Sade
- Shakatak
- Soul Ballet
- Spyro Gyra
- Swing Out Sister
- The Jazzmasters
- The Manhattan Transfer
- The Style Council
- The Terry Disley Experience
- The Three Sounds
- Turning Point
- Urban Knights
- Weather Report
- Yellowjackets

== Vocalists ==
- Sade Adu
- Gabriela Anders
- Carl Anderson
- Patti Austin
- Anita Baker
- Basia
- Regina Belle
- Ray Brown, Jr.
- Michael Bublé
- Bobby Caldwell
- Carmel
- Natalie Cole
- Randy Crawford
- Will Downing
- Carol Duboc
- Eliane Elias
- Everything but the Girl
- Michael Franks
- Laura Fygi
- Melody Gardot
- Astrud Gilberto
- Bebel Gilberto
- Lalah Hathaway
- Ilse Huizinga
- James Ingram
- Janita
- Al Jarreau
- Norah Jones
- Kem
- Diana Krall
- Viktor Lazlo
- Maysa Leak
- David Longoria
- Gigi MacKenzie
- Raul Midón
- Jane Monheit
- Chanté Moore
- Jeffrey Osborne
- Phil Perry
- Kenny Rankin
- Dianne Reeves
- Diane Schuur
- Marilyn Scott
- Sting
- Lindsey Webster
- Joe Williams
- Nancy Wilson
- Lizz Wright

== Other Instruments ==
- Brian Culbertson (Trombone)
- Eddie Daniels (Clarinet)
- Deborah Henson-Conant (Harp)
- Skinny Hightower (Vibraphone)
- Catya Maré (Violin)
- Andy Narell (Pan Drum)
- Lee Oskar (Harmonica)
- Noel Pointer (violinist, singer, pianist and composer)
- Jean-Luc Ponty (Violin)
- Bill Reichenbach Jr. (Trombone)
- Noel Webb (Violin)

== Composers ==
- David Benoit
- Brian Culbertson
- Sam Cardon
- Russ Freeman
- Dave Grusin
- Paul Hardcastle
- Skinny Hightower
- Bob James
- Quincy Jones
- Bradley Joseph
- Ottmar Liebert
- David Longoria
- Erik van der Luijt
- Ralph MacDonald
- Catya Maré
- Dan Siegel

== Disc jockeys ==
- Art Good, host of Jazztrax
- Dave Koz, saxophonist who hosted a morning show in Los Angeles as well as a weekly syndicated program.
- Paul Hardcastle, syndicated weekend radio show
- Norman Brown, syndicated weekend radio show
- Brian Culbertson, syndicated weekend radio show
- David Longoria, 24k Music Network syndicated television and radio show Welcome To The World
- Kenny G, syndicated weekend radio show

== See also ==
- List of jazz fusion artists
