= List of Billboard Smooth Jazz Airplay number-ones of 2021 =

The Smooth Jazz Airplay number-ones from Billboard for 2021.

== 2021 number-ones ==
2021
Issue date	Song	Artist(s)	Ref.
January 2	"Better Days Ahead"	Gerald Albright	
January 9	"Better Days Ahead"	Gerald Albright	
January 16	"Better Days Ahead"	Gerald Albright	
January 23	"Blue Moon"	Skinny Hightower	
January 30	"Don't Wanna Let Go"	Riley Richard	
February 6	"Don't Wanna Let Go"	Riley Richard	
February 13	"Don't Wanna Let Go"	Riley Richard	
February 20	"Too Tuff"	Freddie Fox	
February 27	"Magic Hour"	Sean U featuring Blake Aaron	
March 6	"Style and Elegance"	JJ Sansaverino	
March 13	"Nothin' but Love"	Paul Brown featuring Jeff Ryan	
March 20	"Nothin' but Love"	Paul Brown featuring Jeff Ryan	
March 27	"It's My Time"	Willie Bradley featuring James Lloyd	
April 3	"Exhale"	Patrick Bradley	
April 10	"Welcome to the Beach"	Paul Hardcastle	
April 17	"Welcome to the Beach"	Paul Hardcastle	
April 24	"Sway"	Julian Vaughn	
May 1	"Dr. Norm"	Dave Koz featuring Paul Jackson Jr.	
May 8	"Dr. Norm"	Dave Koz featuring Paul Jackson Jr.	
May 15	"Just Groovin'"	Norman Brown	
May 22	"Just Groovin'"	Norman Brown	
May 29	"Hurry Up and Wait"	Oli Silk	
June 5	"Kickin It Up"	Jazmin Ghent	
June 12	"Sunday Strut"	Blake Aaron featuring Najee	
June 19	"Fireball"	Tim Bowman	
June 26	"Hope"	Gerald Albright	
July 3	"Hope"	Gerald Albright	
July 10	"Affection"	Randy Scott	
July 17	"Sunrise Boulevard"	Greg Manning	
July 24	"Now or Never"	Skinny Hightower	
July 31	"Just like Music"	Ben Tankard	
August 7	"Sentimental Soul"	Jeff Ryan	
August 14	"Keys to Paradise"	Jonathan Fritzén	
August 21	"Summer Song"	Paula Atherton featuring Nathan Mitchell	
August 28	"Summer Song"	Paula Atherton featuring Nathan Mitchell	
September 4	"Release"	Lin Rountree	
September 11	"Living Out Loud"	Steve Cole	
September 18	"Midnight Sun"	Darren Rahn	
September 25	"Non Stop"	Andy Snitzer	
October 2	"Right Around the Corner"	Nick Colionne	
October 9	"On the Move"	Vincent Ingala	
October 16	"On the Move"	Vincent Ingala	
October 23	"Tropicool"	Paul Hardcastle	
October 30	"Risin' Up"	Adam Hawley	
November 6	"Open Portals"	Kayla Waters	
November 13	"Hispanica"	Christian de Mesones featuring Bob James	
November 20	"Feels So Right"	Blake Aaron	
November 27	"Serendipity"	The Saxtress Pamela Williams featuring Gerald Albright	
December 4	"Straight to the Point"	Paul Taylor	
December 11	"I'm Every Woman"	Kim Scott featuring Althea Rene and Ragan Whiteside	
December 18	"Straight to the Point"	Paul Taylor	
December 25	"Sundance"	Boney James	
