= List of Billboard Smooth Jazz Airplay number-ones of 2020 =

The Smooth Jazz Airplay number-ones from Billboard for 2020.

== 2020 number-ones ==
2020
| Issue date | Song | Artist(s) | Ref. |
|---|---|---|---|
| January 4 | "Full Bloom" | Kayla Waters | |
| January 11 | "Full Bloom" | Kayla Waters | |
| January 18 | "Full Bloom" | Kayla Waters | |
| January 25 | "Listen to This" | Lisa Addeo | |
| February 1 | "Dancing Galaxies | Paul Hardcastle | |
| February 8 | "Dancing Galaxies | Paul Hardcastle | |
| February 15 | "Fall for You" | Blake Aaron | |
| February 22 | "Details" | Jacob Webb featuring Stantawn Kendrick | |
| February 29 | "Details" | Jacob Webb featuring Stantawn Kendrick | |
| March 7 | "Details" | Jacob Webb featuring Stantawn Kendrick | |
| March 14 | "Details" | Jacob Webb featuring Stantawn Kendrick | |
| March 21 | "Is There a Doctor in the House?" | Chris Standring | |
| March 28 | "Is There a Doctor in the House?" | Chris Standring | |
| April 4 | "Is There a Doctor in the House?" | Chris Standring | |
| April 11 | "Is There a Doctor in the House?" | Chris Standring | |
| April 18 | "Can You Feel It" | Paula Atherton | |
| April 25 | "Can You Feel It" | Paula Atherton | |
| May 2 | "Can You Feel It" | Paula Atherton | |
| May 9 | "Infinite Love" | Darren Rahn | |
| May 16 | "Get Up!" | Brian Culbertson featuring Mr. TalkBox and Marcus Anderson | |
| May 23 | "Solid" | Boney James | |
| May 30 | "Let's Get Serious" | Nick Colionne | |
| June 6 | "Let's Get Serious" | Nick Colionne | |
| June 13 | "Let's Get Serious" | Nick Colionne | |
| June 20 | "Free to Be" | Kim Scott featuring Jazmin Ghent | |
| June 27 | "Snack Grouch" | Cindy Bradley | |
| July 4 | "Snack Grouch" | Cindy Bradley | |
| July 11 | "New Bounce" | Oli Silk featuring Vincent Ingala | |
| July 18 | "New Bounce" | Oli Silk featuring Vincent Ingala | |
| July 25 | "New Bounce" | Oli Silk featuring Vincent Ingala | |
| August 1 | "Vibin' in Time" | Alex Parchment featuring Phillip Doc Martin | |
| August 8 | "Caught in the Groove" | Nils Jiptner | |
| August 15 | "Latitude" | Paul Hardcastle | |
| August 22 | "Keep Movin'" | Brian Culbertson featuring Everette Harp | |
| August 29 | "Shake You Up" | Chris Standring | |
| September 5 | "Afternoon Delight" | Julian Vaughn featuring Elan Trotman | |
| September 12 | "Dirty Dozen" | Euge Groove | |
| September 19 | "Afternoon Delight" | Julian Vaughn featuring Elan Trotman | |
| September 26 | "It's on Now" | Willie Bradley featuring Ragan Whiteside | |
| October 3 | "Fluid" | Lin Rountree | |
| October 10 | "Joy Ride" | Randy Scott | |
| October 17 | "Full Effect" | Boney James | |
| October 24 | "Full Effect" | Boney James | |
| October 31 | "Escape" | Adam Hawley featuring Rick Braun | |
| November 7 | "Escape" | Adam Hawley featuring Rick Braun | |
| November 14 | "Escape" | Adam Hawley featuring Rick Braun | |
| November 21 | "Outta Sight" | Nils Jiptner | |
| November 28 | "Side by Side" | Dave Koz featuring David Sanborn | |
| December 5 | "Side by Side" | Dave Koz featuring David Sanborn | |
| December 12 | "Side by Side" | Dave Koz featuring David Sanborn | |
| December 19 | "Side by Side" | Dave Koz featuring David Sanborn | |
| December 26 | "Better Days Ahead" | Gerald Albright | |
