= List of Billboard Smooth Jazz Airplay number-ones of 2022 =

The Smooth Jazz Airplay number-ones from Billboard for 2022.

== 2022 number-ones ==
2022
| Issue date | Song | Artist(s) | Ref. |
|---|---|---|---|
| January 1 | "Daydreams" | Randy Scott featuring Cindy Bradley | |
| January 8 | "Urban Troubadour" | Phil Denny | |
| January 15 | "Urban Troubadour" | Phil Denny | |
| January 22 | "Crazy" | Gerald Albright | |
| January 29 | "Crazy" | Gerald Albright | |
| February 5 | "The Closer We Get" | Dave Koz | |
| February 12 | "Nothing Better" | Jacob Webb featuring Jazmin Ghent | |
| February 19 | "Any Moment" | Le Sonic featuring Robert Lee | |
| February 26 | "Nothing Better" | Jacob Webb featuring Jazmin Ghent | |
| March 5 | "Feelings" | Nicholas Cole featuring Julian Vaughn | |
| March 12 | "Stylish" | Judah Sealy | |
| March 19 | "Change the World" | Chris Standring | |
| March 26 | "Out to Lunch" | Oli Silk | |
| April 2 | "Out to Lunch" | Oli Silk | |
| April 9 | "Wavelength" | Paul Hardcastle featuring Rock Hendricks | |
| April 16 | "Let It Flow" | Ryan La Valette | |
| April 23 | "What You Do to Me" | Nick Colionne | |
| April 30 | "What You Do to Me" | Nick Colionne | |
| May 7 | "What You Do to Me" | Nick Colionne | |
| May 14 | "Shadow Dancer" | Vincent Ingala | |
| May 21 | "Shadow Dancer" | Vincent Ingala | |
| May 28 | "Shadow Dancer" | Vincent Ingala | |
| June 4 | "G Wiggle" | Gerald Albright | |
| June 11 | "Move Ahead" | Richard Elliot | |
| June 18 | "Move Ahead" | Richard Elliot | |
| June 25 | "Q's Vibe" | Eric Valentine featuring Everette Harp and Greg Manning | |
| July 2 | "Dreamland" | Blake Aaron | |
| July 9 | "Catalina Nights" | The Braxton Brothers | |
| July 16 | "Catalina Nights" | The Braxton Brothers | |
| July 23 | "Soul Ties" | Marcus Anderson featuring Darnell "Showcase" Taylor | |
| July 30 | "Soul Ties" | Marcus Anderson featuring Darnell "Showcase" Taylor | |
| August 6 | "Friday@5" | Paul Taylor | |
| August 13 | "Thrill Ride" | Ragan Whiteside | |
| August 20 | "Summertime in NYC" | Dave Koz featuring Brian McKnight | |
| August 27 | "Drive" | Cindy Bradley | |
| September 3 | "Drive" | Cindy Bradley | |
| September 10 | "Jazz Party" | Jeffery Smith | |
| September 17 | "Secret Sauce" | Paul Brown | |
| September 24 | "Highway 10" | Ryan La Valette | |
| October 1 | "Bring It Back" | Boney James featuring Dontae Winslow | |
| October 8 | "Secret Sauce" | Paul Brown | |
| October 15 | "I'll Be the One" | Le Sonic featuring Lauran Beluzo and Robert Lee | |
| October 22 | "Let's Get Down Tonight" | Adam Hawley featuring Vincent Ingala | |
| October 29 | "Let's Get Down Tonight" | Adam Hawley featuring Vincent Ingala | |
| November 5 | "Paradigm Shift" | Carol Albert featuring Paul Brown | |
| November 12 | "Co-Motion" | Lemek | |
| November 19 | "Co-Motion" | Lemek | |
| November 26 | "Co-Motion" | Lemek | |
| December 3 | "Co-Motion" | Lemek | |
| December 10 | "Good on You" | Will Donato | |
| December 17 | "Broken Promises" | Quintin Gerard W. featuring Michael Broening | |
| December 24 | "Good on You" | Will Donato | |
| December 31 | "Good on You" | Will Donato | |
