= List of Billboard Smooth Jazz Airplay number-ones of 2025 =

The Smooth Jazz Airplay number-ones from Billboard for 2025.

== 2025 number-ones ==
2025
Issue date	Song	Artist(s)	Ref.
January 4	"Happy Hour"	Michael Broening	
January 11	"Slide"	Boney James	
January 18	"Slide"	Boney James	
January 25	"Daydreaming"	Ryan La Valette	
February 1	"Daydreaming"	Ryan La Valette	
February 8	"Daydreaming"	Ryan La Valette	
February 15	"Patches' Groove"	Les Sabler	
February 22	"A Little Moxie"	Cindy Bradley	
March 1	"A Little Moxie"	Cindy Bradley	
March 8	"Wheels in Motion"	Mark Jaimes	
March 15	"Seaside Story"	Carol Albert	
March 22	"So in Love with You"	Nathan Mitchell featuring Chelsey Green	
March 29	"Longing for You"	Donald Hayes featuring Nathan East	
April 5	"Longing for You"	Donald Hayes featuring Nathan East	
April 12	"Let's Get Lost"	Blake Aaron	
April 19	"Let's Get Lost"	Blake Aaron	
April 26	"Let's Get Lost"	Blake Aaron	
May 3	"Top Hat & Tails"	Chris Standring	
May 10	"Top Hat & Tails"	Chris Standring	
May 17	"Absolute Love"	Adam Hawley featuring Judah Sealy	
May 24	"Meant to Be"	Special EFX featuring Chieli Minucci	
May 31	"Let's Get to It"	Vincent Ingala	
June 7	"Let's Get to It"	Vincent Ingala	
June 14	"Let's Get to It"	Vincent Ingala	
June 21	"So Naturally"	Lin Rountree	
June 28	"So Naturally"	Lin Rountree	
July 5	"Straight Up Down"	Richard Elliot	
July 12	"Oooh-Aah (Catalina)"	Mindi Abair	
July 19	"Release Me"	Ryan La Valette	
July 26	"Release Me"	Ryan La Valette	
August 2	"Blue Magic"	Nicholas Cole	
August 9	"Blue Magic"	Nicholas Cole	
August 16	"Too Good 2 Let Go"	Eric Darius	
August 23	"Blue Magic"	Nicholas Cole	
August 30	"Too Good 2 Let Go"	Eric Darius	
September 6	"Together Again"	Michael Broening	
September 13	"Living My Best Life"	Gerald Albright	
September 20	"Living My Best Life"	Gerald Albright	
September 27	"Show Me the Way"	3rd Force	
October 4	"Show Me the Way"	3rd Force	
October 11	"De Nada"	Roberto Restuccia	
October 18	"On the Road"	Brian Culbertson featuring Marcus Miller and Sheila E.	
October 25	"On the Road"	Brian Culbertson featuring Marcus Miller and Sheila E.	
November 1	"Feel the Heat"	Nathan Mitchell featuring Patrick Bryant and Mo'Horns	
November 8	"Sooo Good"	Adrian Crutchfield	
November 15	"Sooo Good"	Adrian Crutchfield	
November 22	"Sooo Good"	Adrian Crutchfield	
November 29	"Dare to Fly"	Blake Aaron	
December 6	"London Nights"	Ryan La Valette	
December 13	"The Bounce"	Boney James	
December 20	"London Nights"	Ryan La Valette	
December 27	"London Nights"	Ryan La Valette	
