= List of Billboard Smooth Jazz Airplay number-ones of 2017 =

The Smooth Jazz Airplay number-ones from Billboard for 2017.

== 2017 number-ones ==
2017
Issue date	Song	Artist(s)	Ref.
January 7	"Lifecycle"	Nathan East	
January 14	"Lifecycle"	Nathan East	
January 21	"Lifecycle"	Nathan East	
January 28	"Lifecycle"	Nathan East	
February 4	"Do I Do"	Peter White	
February 11	"Do I Do"	Peter White	
February 18	"Do I Do"	Peter White	
February 25	"Do I Do"	Peter White	
March 4	"Morning Call"	Nick Colionne	
March 11	"Morning Call"	Nick Colionne	
March 18	"Morning Call"	Nick Colionne	
March 25	"Morning Call"	Nick Colionne	
April 1	"Category A"	Cindy Bradley featuring Chris Standring	
April 8	"I Am"	Kayla Waters featuring Kim Waters	
April 15	"Hey Girl"	Brian Culbertson	
April 22	"Hey Girl"	Brian Culbertson	
April 29	"Hey Girl"	Brian Culbertson	
May 6	"Why Not"	Marc Antoine featuring Philippe Saisse	
May 13	"Hush"	Paul Brown	
May 20	"Hush"	Paul Brown	
May 27	"Where Do You Want to Go"	Lindsey Webster	
June 3	"Where Do You Want to Go"	Lindsey Webster	
June 10	"Harry the Hipster"	Richard Elliot	
June 17	"Harry the Hipster"	Richard Elliot	
June 24	"Like This, Like That"	Chris Standring	
July 1	"Lavish"	Special EFX	
July 8	"It Keeps Coming Back"	Norman Brown	
July 15	"Lavish"	Special EFX	
July 22	"Taboo"	Skinny Hightower featuring Andrew Hawkley	
July 29	"Summer Nights"	Jazz Holdouts	
August 5	"Summer Nights"	Jazz Holdouts	
August 12	"I Don't Mind"	Adam Hawley featuring Euge Groove	
August 19	"I Don't Mind"	Adam Hawley featuring Euge Groove	
August 26	"Uncle Nick"	Nick Colionne	
September 2	"I Don't Mind"	Adam Hawley featuring Euge Groove	
September 9	"Caminando"	David Benoit and Marc Antoine	
September 16	"Caminando"	David Benoit and Marc Antoine	
September 23	"Caminando"	David Benoit and Marc Antoine	
September 30	"Caminando"	David Benoit and Marc Antoine	
October 7	"Frankie B."	Gerald Albright	
October 14	"Tick Tock"	Boney James	
October 21	"Tick Tock"	Boney James	
October 28	"Tick Tock"	Boney James	
November 4	"Tick Tock"	Boney James	
November 11	"Let's Take It Back"	Najee featuring Incognito	
November 18	"Let's Take It Back"	Najee featuring Incognito	
November 25	"Let's Take It Back"	Najee featuring Incognito	
December 2	"Piccadilly Circus"	Paul Brown featuring Chris Standring	
December 9	"Piccadilly Circus"	Paul Brown featuring Chris Standring	
December 16	"Piccadilly Circus"	Paul Brown featuring Chris Standring	
December 23	"Baby Coffee"	Michael J Thomas	
December 30	"Baby Coffee"	Michael J Thomas	
