= List of Billboard Smooth Jazz Airplay number-ones of 2026 =

The Smooth Jazz Airplay number-ones from Billboard for 2026.

== 2026 number-ones ==
2026
Issue date	Song	Artist(s)	Ref.
January 3	"Shine"	Nicholas Cole	
January 10	"Shine"	Nicholas Cole	
January 17	"Shine"	Nicholas Cole	
January 24	"RollerSk8"	Adam Hawley	
January 31	"RollerSk8"	Adam Hawley	
February 7	"RollerSk8"	Adam Hawley	
February 14	"Driftin'"	Richard Elliot	
February 21	"Synergy"	Althea Rene featuring Jordan Love	
February 28	"Any Time, Any Place"	Byron Miller featuring Ragan Whiteside	
March 7	"Synergy"	Althea Rene featuring Jordan Love	
March 14	"Onward and Upward"	3rd Force	
March 21	"Give It All You Got"	Rick Braun featuring Tom Scott	
March 28	"Give It All You Got"	Rick Braun featuring Tom Scott	
April 4	"After Hours"	WaKaNa	
April 11	"Speakeasy"	Jeff Ryan	
April 18	"Speakeasy"	Jeff Ryan	
April 25	"Colors"	The TNR Collective	
May 2	"City Walk"	Carol Albert	
May 9	"City Walk"	Carol Albert	
May 16	"More Than Enough"	Gerald Albright	
May 23	"More Than Enough"	Gerald Albright	
May 30	"Take Your Time"	Phylicia Rae	
June 6	"Take Your Time"	Phylicia Rae	
June 13	"Electric"	Adam Hawley featuring Everette Harp	
June 20	"Electric"	Adam Hawley featuring Everette Harp	
June 27	"Hide & Seek"	Kim Scott	
July 4	"Hide & Seek"	Kim Scott	
July 11	"Catch a Feelin'"	Najee and Will Downing	
July 18	"Boarding Pass"	David Benoit and Jeff Lorber	
July 25	"Joy and Pain"	Nils	
August 1	"Hypnotic"	Adrian Crutchfield featuring Nicholas Cole	
August 8	"Hypnotic"	Adrian Crutchfield featuring Nicholas Cole	
August 15	"HEPnotic (Hep Is the New Hip)"	Bob Baldwin	
August 22	"Green Light"	Nicholas Cole	
August 29	"Maputo Nights"	Eric Darius	
September 5	"Maputo Nights"	Eric Darius	
September 12	"In Love: Reimagined"	Ragan Whiteside	
September 19	"Jolanda"	Greg Manning featuring Kirk Whalum	
September 26	"Yessir!"	Oli Silk featuring Jeff Ryan	
October 3	"The Phoenix"	Euge Groove	
October 10	"The Phoenix"	Euge Groove	
October 17	"The Phoenix"	Euge Groove	
October 24	"Vertical Horizon"	Carol Albert	
October 31	"Skate On"	Evan Taylor featuring Dave Koz	
November 7	"Power Move"	Adam Hawley featuring Jeff Ryan	
November 14	"Storybook"	Boney James featuring Larry Carlton	
November 21	"Storybook"	Boney James featuring Larry Carlton	
November 28	"Gridlock"	BPM: Brian Bromberg, Paul Brown and Michael Paulo	
