= List of Billboard Smooth Jazz Airplay number-ones of 2019 =

The Smooth Jazz Airplay number-ones from Billboard for 2019.

== 2019 number-ones ==
2019
Issue date	Song	Artist(s)	Ref.
January 5	"Snap, Crackle, Pop"	Vincent Ingala	
January 12	"Snap, Crackle, Pop"	Vincent Ingala	
January 19	"Snap, Crackle, Pop"	Vincent Ingala	
January 26	"Backyard Brew"	The JT Project featuring Najee	
February 2	"Backyard Brew"	The JT Project featuring Najee	
February 9	"Backyard Brew"	The JT Project featuring Najee	
February 16	"Backyard Brew"	The JT Project featuring Najee	
February 23	"Rise!"	Ben Tankard	
March 2	"Rise!"	Ben Tankard	
March 9	"How Sweet It Is (To Be Loved by You)"	Nick Colionne	
March 16	"Top Down"	Greg Manning	
March 23	"Infinite Soul"	Will Donato	
March 30	"Good to Go"	John Novello featuring Eric Marienthal	
April 6	"Good to Go"	John Novello featuring Eric Marienthal	
April 13	"The King Is Here"	Norman Brown	
April 20	"The King Is Here"	Norman Brown	
April 27	"Spirit Dance"	Keiko Matsui featuring Gretchen Parlato	
May 4	"Happy Go Lucky"	Paul Hardcastle	
May 11	"Silver Arrows"	The Rippingtons featuring Russ Freeman	
May 18	"Silver Arrows"	The Rippingtons featuring Russ Freeman	
May 25	"Silver Arrows"	The Rippingtons featuring Russ Freeman	
June 1	"Emerge"	Kim Scott featuring Jonathan Fritzén	
June 8	"Emerge"	Kim Scott featuring Jonathan Fritzén	
June 15	"Stylin'"	Gregory Goodloe	
June 22	"Black Dynamite"	Julian Vaughn	
June 29	"Black Dynamite"	Julian Vaughn	
July 6	"Topside"	Bob James Trio	
July 13	"Topside"	Bob James Trio	
July 20	"Topside"	Bob James Trio	
July 27	"Captivate Me"	Riley Richard	
August 3	"Captivate Me"	Riley Richard	
August 10	"Captivate Me"	Riley Richard	
August 17	"Eddie's Ready"	Thom Rotella	
August 24	"I'll Never Love Again"	Michael J Thomas	
August 31	"Moon Over Gotham"	Keiko Matsui	
September 7	"Moon Over Gotham"	Keiko Matsui	
September 14	"Cinco Cinco Seis"	Four80East	
September 21	"Cinco Cinco Seis"	Four80East	
September 28	"Cinco Cinco Seis"	Four80East	
October 5	"Soulmate"	Nicholas Cole featuring Chieli Minucci	
October 12	"Soulmate"	Nicholas Cole featuring Chieli Minucci	
October 19	"Crossroads"	Rick Braun	
October 26	"Crossroads"	Rick Braun	
November 2	"Before I Let Go"	Dave Koz / Gerald Albright / Rick Braun / Richard Elliot / Aubrey Logan	
November 9	"It's So Amazing"	Joyce Cooling	
November 16	"Wind Chill Factor"	Cindy Bradley	
November 23	"Wind Chill Factor"	Cindy Bradley	
November 30	"Wind Chill Factor"	Cindy Bradley	
December 7	"Wind Chill Factor"	Cindy Bradley	
December 14	"Full Bloom"	Kayla Waters	
December 21	"Full Bloom"	Kayla Waters	
December 28	"Full Bloom"	Kayla Waters	
