= List of Billboard Smooth Jazz Airplay number-ones of 2024 =

The Smooth Jazz Airplay number-ones from Billboard for 2024.

== 2024 number-ones ==
2024
Issue date	Song	Artist(s)	Ref.
January 6	"South Bay"	Michael Lington	
January 13	"South Bay"	Michael Lington	
January 20	"South Bay"	Michael Lington	
January 27	"South Bay"	Michael Lington	
February 3	"My Heart to Yours"	Ellis Hamilton	
February 10	"Light This Candle"	Slim Gambill	
February 17	"Light This Candle"	Slim Gambill	
February 24	"Light This Candle"	Slim Gambill	
March 2	"Light This Candle"	Slim Gambill	
March 9	"Bon Appetit"	Jonathan Butler	
March 16	"Bon Appetit"	Jonathan Butler	
March 23	"Bon Appetit"	Jonathan Butler	
March 30	"After Twilight"	Lawson Rollins featuring Shahin Shahida	
April 6	"Promise"	Cindy Bradley	
April 13	"She's the One"	Blake Aaron	
April 20	"Cigar Lounge"	Big Mike Hart featuring Boney James	
April 27	"Tell Me Something"	Quintin Gerard W.	
May 4	"Cigar Lounge"	Big Mike Hart featuring Boney James	
May 11	"Cigar Lounge"	Big Mike Hart featuring Boney James	
May 18	"The Way She Moves"	Michael Broening	
May 25	"Ocean Breeze"	Tim Bowman	
June 1	"Anything"	Norman Brown	
June 8	"Anything"	Norman Brown	
June 15	"Anything"	Norman Brown	
June 22	"Take It or Leave It"	Le Sonic featuring Lauran Beluzo	
June 29	"Anything"	Norman Brown	
July 6	"Anything"	Norman Brown	
July 13	"Sunshine Yellow"	Carol Albert featuring Peter White	
July 20	"Sunshine Yellow"	Carol Albert featuring Peter White	
July 27	"Full Throttle"	Gerald Albright	
August 3	"Full Throttle"	Gerald Albright	
August 10	"Full Throttle"	Gerald Albright	
August 17	"Hypnotized"	The TNR Collective	
August 24	"Diamond Dress"	Lisa Addeo	
August 31	"Diamond Dress"	Lisa Addeo	
September 7	"Cool Summer"	Special EFX featuring Chieli Minucci	
September 14	"Cool Summer"	Special EFX featuring Chieli Minucci	
September 21	"Groovin' On"	Gregory Goodloe	
September 28	"Groovin' On"	Gregory Goodloe	
October 5	"Embrace"	Randy Scott featuring Bill Moio	
October 12	"Movin' and Shakin'"	Vincent Ingala	
October 19	"Movin' and Shakin'"	Vincent Ingala	
October 26	"Brown Sugar"	Nicholas Cole	
November 2	"Very Delicious"	Richard Elliot	
November 9	"Runnin' Hot"	Elan Trotman	
November 16	"Runnin' Hot"	Elan Trotman	
November 23	"Runnin' Hot"	Elan Trotman	
November 30	"Upgrade"	Jazmin Ghent	
December 7	"Slide"	Boney James	
December 14	"Happy Hour"	Michael Broening	
December 21	"Automatic"	Dave Koz and Adam Hawley	
December 28	"Automatic"	Dave Koz and Adam Hawley	
