= Tanya Nolan =

American singer-songwriter

- Born: December 24, 1973 (age 52); Galveston, Texas, U.S.
- Origin: Houston, Texas, U.S.
- Genres: Contemporary R&B; soul music; smooth jazz
- Occupations: Singer songwriter record producer
- Website: tanyanolanmusic.com

Tanya Nolan (born December 24, 1973) is an American singer-songwriter. She has appeared on Billboard's Adult R&B Airplay and Smooth Jazz Airplay charts. Nolan founded the record label ArtsessionZ and operates childcare businesses in Galveston County, Texas.

== Early life and education ==
Nolan was born and raised in Galveston, Texas. She was a snare drummer for the Grambling State University Tiger Marching Band while attending Grambling State University.

== Career ==
In 2022, her single "Good Woman" charted on the Billboard Adult R&B Airplay chart. Her collaboration with CeeLo Green, "My Best," also appeared on the same chart. In 2023, "Pace Yourself" featuring Raheem DeVaughn continued her presence on the Adult R&B Airplay chart.

In 2024, Nolan released the smooth jazz single "Nobody." In 2025, "Like Water (SoulPersona Remix)" charted on the Billboard Smooth Jazz Airplay chart. In 2025, she released "Blessings," her first gospel single.

=== Business and philanthropy ===
Nolan owns and operates childcare centers in the Galveston area, including Aww Better Child Care and Nolan's Child Care Center. She also works in real estate and consumer product development.

Her nonprofit organization, Nolan's Gift of Hope, conducts community outreach. She has performed for the She Ready Foundation, founded by Tiffany Haddish.

== Personal life ==
Nolan is a member of the LGBTQ+ community. She married Kimberly Crawford.

== Honors ==
Nolan has received a Presidential Lifetime Achievement Award (2024), honorary doctorates in Humanitarianism and Music from Leaders Esteem University (2024), and an annual proclamation of Tanya Nolan Day by the City of Galveston.

== Discography ==
- "Good Woman" (2022) – No. 20 Billboard Adult R&B Airplay
- "My Best" featuring CeeLo Green (2022) – No. 25 Billboard Adult R&B Airplay
- "Pace Yourself" featuring Raheem DeVaughn (2023) – No. 13 Billboard Adult R&B Airplay
- "Nobody" (2024) – No. 28 Billboard Smooth Jazz Airplay
- "Like Water (SoulPersona Remix)" (2025) – No. 11 Billboard Smooth Jazz Airplay
- "Blessings" (2025) - No.1 Billboard Gospel Airplay

== See also ==
- Adult R&B Songs
- Smooth Jazz Airplay
- List of Billboard Smooth Jazz Airplay number-ones of the 2020s
- LGBTQ culture in Houston
