= Michael J. Thomas =

Michael J. Thomas may refer to:

- Mike Thomas (athletic director), American university administrator
- Michael J Thomas, American saxophonist, songwriter, and vocalist
