= Ken Navarro =

American jazz guitarist (born 1953)

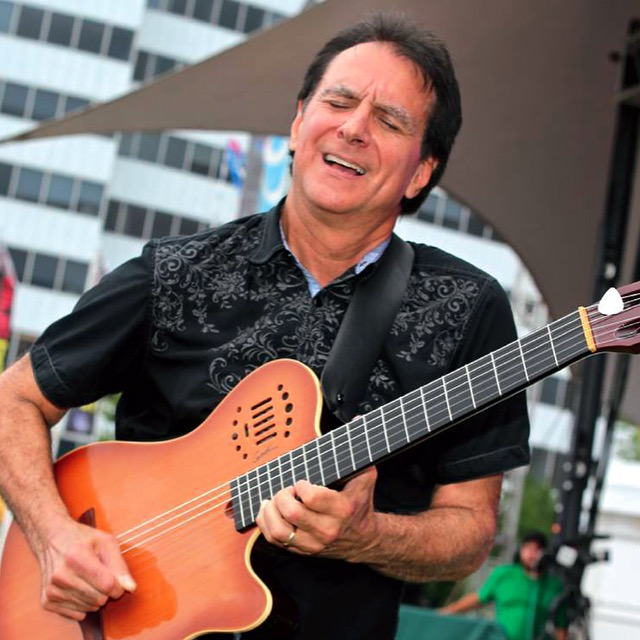
- Ken Navarro in concert

Background information
- Born: June 9, 1953; Lafayette, Indiana, U.S.
- Genres: Contemporary jazz
- Occupations: Musician, record label owner
- Instrument: Guitar
- Years active: 1984-present
- Labels: Positive Music, Shanachie
- Website: www.kennavarro.com

Ken Navarro (born June 9, 1953) is an American contemporary jazz guitarist from Lafayette, Indiana.

== Career ==
Navarro worked as a studio musician in Los Angeles, performing with Dave Koz, Nell Carter, and Doc Severinsen. In 1990, Navarro released his debut album, The River Flows, on his own record label. His second album was nominated for a Grammy Award. His 28 albums have included appearances by Dave Weckl, John Patitucci, Chad Wackerman, Brandon Fields, and Eric Marienthal. Navarro has also produced albums for saxophonist Eric Darius, Tony Craddock Jr.and pianist Jay Rowe.

On the smooth jazz chart at Billboard magazine, his song "You Are Everything" reached No. 6, "Juliet" reached No. 7, "When We Dance" reached No. 11 and "Ruby Lane" reached No. 10.

== Discography ==
Year	Title	Label
1990	The River Flows	Positive Music
1991	After Dark	Positive Music
1992	Labor of Love	Positive Music
1993	I Can't Complain	Positive Music
1994	Pride & Joy	Positive Music
1995	Brighter Days	Positive Music
1996	When Night Calls	Positive Music
1996	Christmas Cheer	Positive Music
1997	Smooth Sensation	Positive Music
1998	Ablaze in Orlando	Positive Music
1999	In My Wildest Dreams	Positive Music
2000	Island Life	Positive Music
2002	Slow Dance	Shanachie
2003	All the Way	Shanachie
2005	Love Coloured Soul	Positive Music
2007	The Meeting Place	Positive Music
2008	The Grace of Summer Light	Positive Music
2010	Dreaming of Trains	Positive Music
2012	The Test of Time	Positive Music
2014	Ruby Lane	Positive Music
2015	Hope, Joy, Strength	Positive Music
2015	Unbreakable Heart	Positive Music
2016	Bonfire	Positive Music
2018	Music for Guitar and Orchestra	Positive Music
2020	Into the Light	Positive Music
2021	I Will Still Be Here	Positive Music
2023	Love Is Everywhere	Positive Music
2025	It’s Nice To Be With You	Positive Music
