= Skinny Hightower =

American jazz pianist

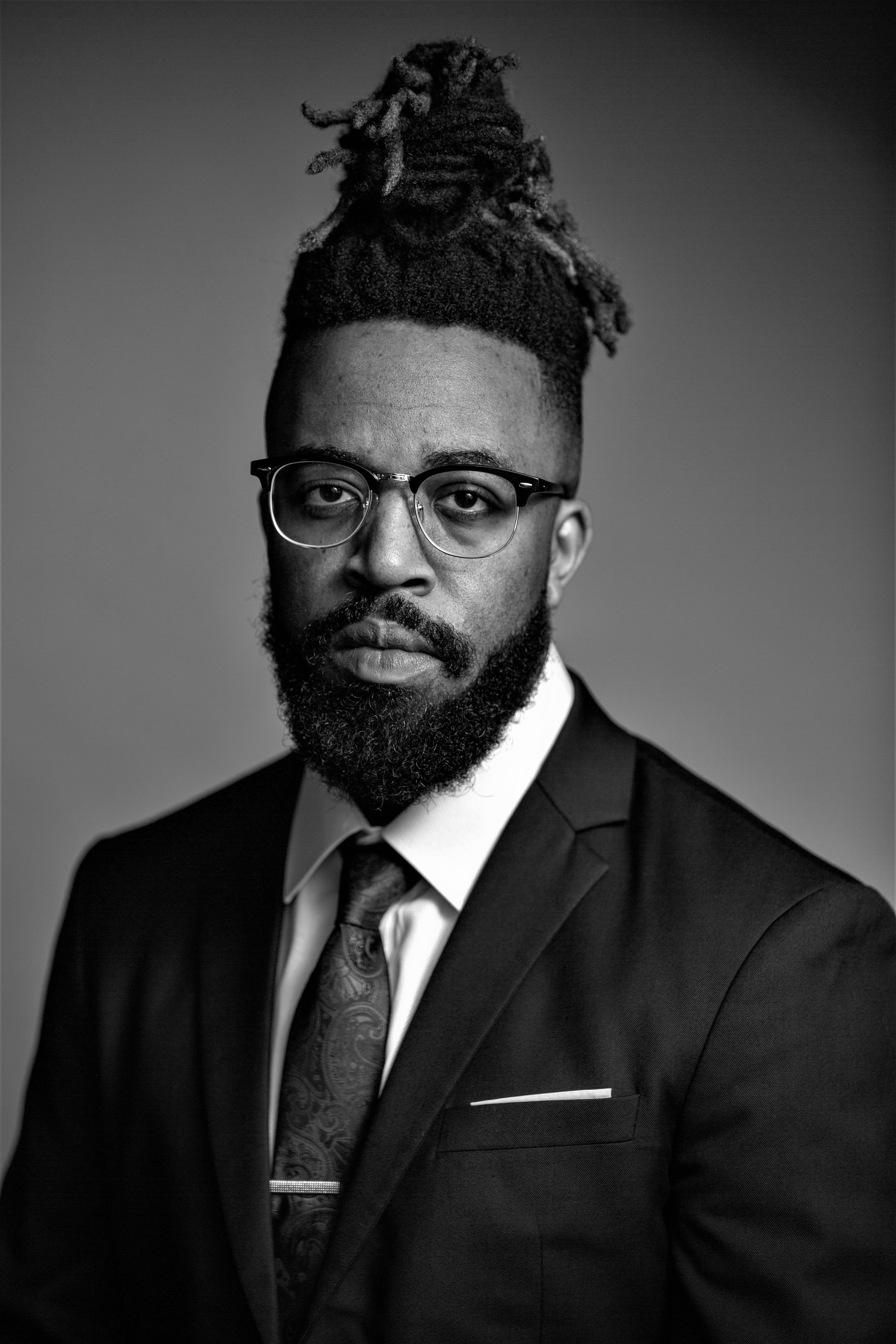
- Hightower in 2023

Background information
- Born: Jason Carroll; November 12, 1985 (age 41); Wichita, Kansas
- Genres: Jazz, smooth jazz
- Occupation: Pianist
- Instruments: Piano; drums; bass; vibraphone
- Years active: 2016–present
- Label: Trippin 'N' Rhythm Records
- Website: skinnyhightower.com
- Military career
- Branch: United States Army
- Service years: 2012–2017
- Rank: Sergeant

Jason Carroll (born November 12, 1985), known professionally as Skinny Hightower, is an American multi-instrumentalist. In 2020, his album Blue Moon finished as the 14th overall smooth jazz album on the Smooth Jazz Year End Top 100 Album Chart. In the same year, his single "Bittersweet" finished as the sixth overall single on the 2020 Billboard Year-End charts for Smooth Jazz Airplay Songs. Two singles from Blue Moon, the title track "Blue Moon" and "Now or Never", finished 36th and 38th respectively on the 2021 Billboard Year-End charts for Smooth Jazz Airplay Songs. Hightower was also the number seven artist on the 2021 Billboard Year-End Smooth Jazz Airplay Artists list. Hightower's singles "Blue Moon," "Now or Never," and "Taboo" all reached number one on the Smooth Jazz Airplay Billboard charts. "Blue Moon" also reached number one on the Smooth Jazz Network Top 20 singles chart. In 2026, his single "Red Lights" peaked at number two on the Smooth Jazz Airplay Billboard charts.

== Early life ==
Hightower was born in Wichita, Kansas on November 12, 1985. Hightower's interest in music began at age two when he would sit on his father's lap and play the drums. His involvement would continue as he later developed a mild interest in piano at age eight and began playing bass at the age of 12. Jazz and gospel were his primary musical influences at the time. Hightower later attended Wichita South High School where he played as a percussionist in the marching band, pep band, jazz band, and concert band.

== Music career ==
=== 2012–2017: Military service and Cloud Nine ===
In 2012, Skinny Hightower enlisted in the United States Army where he served for five years and was promoted up to the rank of Sergeant. He deployed to Afghanistan during the War in Afghanistan for a few months. Four years into his military contract, he recorded and released his first studio album Cloud Nine.

==== Name origin ====
Hightower's pseudonym originated as a nickname given to him by his fellow servicemembers. Upon learning that he was a jazz musician, his Army friends called him a skinny Mr. Hightower (played by Steve Harvey) in connection with the 1996 sitcom The Steve Harvey Show.

=== 2020: Blue Moon ===
In 2020, Skinny Hightower released Blue Moon which spawned the second and third number one Billboard singles of his career. The production of the album consisted of the recording of 100 songs of which 24 were selected by a team of 10 individuals.

== Discography ==
=== Studio albums ===
Album title	Release year	Record label	Ref(s)
Cloud Nine	2016	Vein Records	
Emotions	2017	Trippin 'N' Rhythm Records	
Retrospect	2018	Trippin 'N' Rhythm Records	
Blue Moon	2020	Trippin 'N' Rhythm Records	
Mind Over Matter	2023	Trippin 'N' Rhythm Records	
THE MAN	2024	Trippin 'N' Rhythm Records	
Feels Like Destiny	2026	CastOver Records	

=== Singles ===
Title	Year	Peak chart position	Album	Ref(s)
Title	Year	US Jazz (Smooth)	Album	Ref(s)
"Taboo"	2017	1	Emotions	
"Bittersweet"	2020	3	Blue Moon	
"Blue Moon"	2020	1	Blue Moon	
"Now or Never"	2020	1	Blue Moon	

=== Collaborations ===
Year	Artist	Release	Additional information	Ref(s)
2018	Lin Rountree	Stronger Still	Featured artist, piano	
2019	Cindy Bradley	The Little Things	Bass, vibraphone	

== Live performances ==
=== Festivals ===
Year	Title	Role	Ref(s)
2018	Catalina Island Jazztrax Festival	Featured artist	
2019	Seabreeze Jazz Festival	Featured artist	

== See also ==
=== Music ===
- Billboard charts
- Jazz piano
- Smooth jazz
- Smooth jazz radio

=== Lists ===
- List of jazz pianists
- List of people from Wichita, Kansas
- List of smooth jazz musicians
- Lists of African Americans

=== Other ===
- United States Army
- U.S. Army Sergeant
