= Alan Steward =

Dutch producer

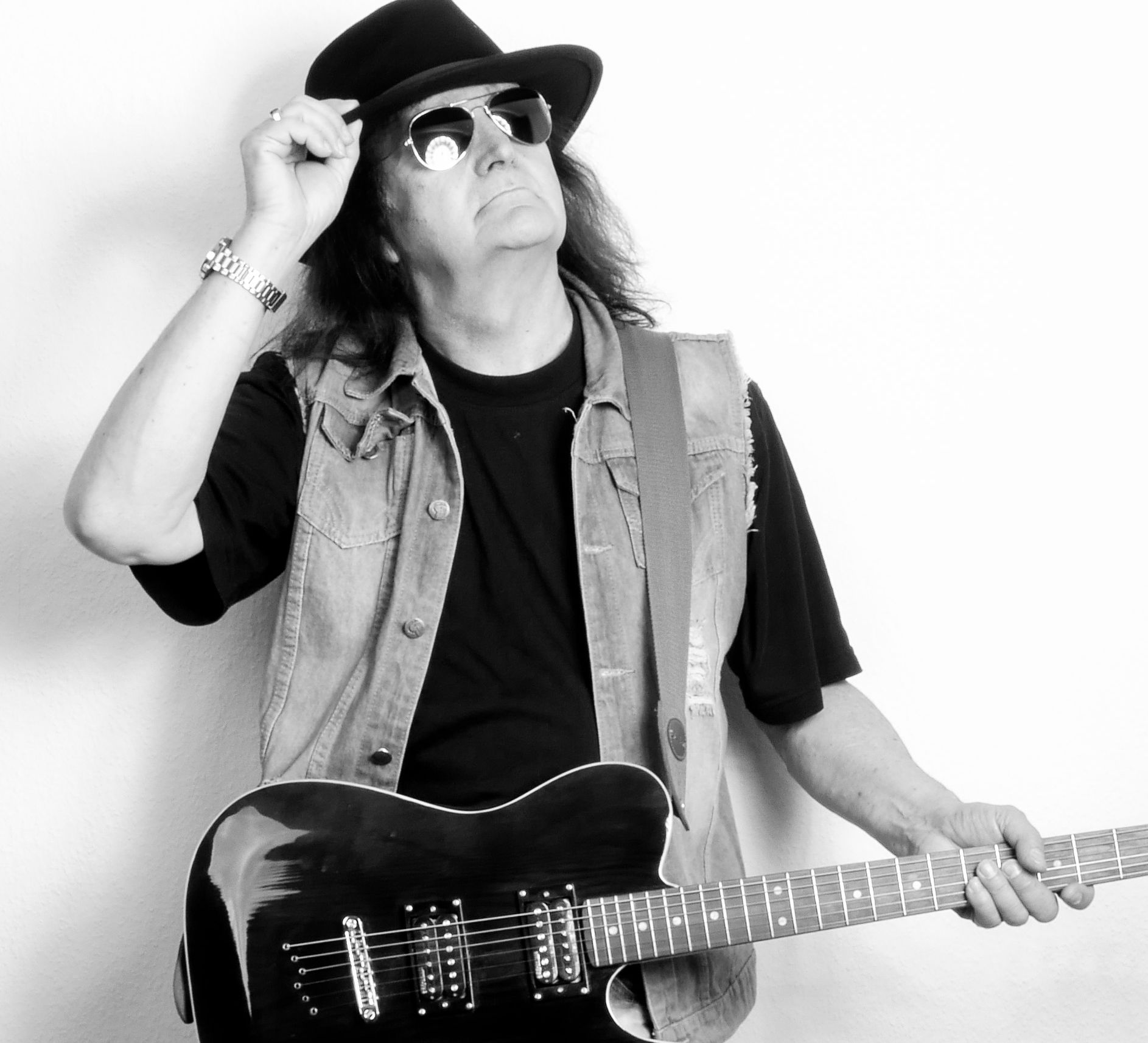

Background information
- Genres: Reggae fusion, dancehall, reggae, funk, jazz fusion
- Occupations: Recording artist, record producer, sound engineer, sound designer
- Instruments: Guitar, keyboards, saxophone, percussion, drums,
- Years active: 1976 – present
- Label: Slim Chance Recordings
- Website: http://www.alansteward.com

Alan Steward is a Dutch producer who produced hits for the likes of Baha Men and five time Grammy winners Dennis Edwards and Eddie Kendricks both original members of The Temptations. Their single "Get it While It's Hot" (co-written by Jermaine Jackson) became a club hit and went on to spawn four remixes. He has currently 6 albums to his name, the latest is the Reggae album "Rise Up", released in 2018.

== Early career ==
Alan is credited by many as a European pioneer of house music and electronic dance music, touring throughout Europe with an elaborate setup of 13 or more keyboards, synthesizers and rhythm boxes (in the early 1970s, at a time when the drum machine wasn't even invented yet and long before the terms house music and electronic dance music even existed).

He was one of the first artists to use sampling (by means of an obscure instrument called the Optigan that used optical discs to play back musical loops. Unlike the other pioneers of electronica like Kraftwerk and Tangerine Dream, Alan's music was always very "danceable", full of R&B and Soul influences and indeed the forerunner of what is now termed House music and Electronic dance music. Alan's musical style is best described as electronic World fusion music with strong Jazz and Funk influences as it combines exotic instruments and voices with jazz, funk grooves and electronica. He also draws on his many years of living in the Caribbean and working with Caribbean artists on his current Reggae album release.

== Music production ==
As a producer, Alan recorded hits for Dennis Edwards and Eddie Kendricks of the legendary Temptations, the Baha Men (of 'who let the dogs out' fame), David Black (Capitol/EMI Records) who went on a World Tour opening for MC Hammer and also appeared on his album 'Too legit to Quit', Isaac Adams (former vocalist for both the Bar Kays and Cameo). He was also asked to do a remix of the Dazz Band's #1 Billboard chart hit "Dazz Dazz Disco Jazz". His engineering credits include multi-platinum artists like: Jermaine Jackson, Melba Moore, Inner Circle, The Temptations, Evelyn 'Champagne' King and Melissa Manchester.

== Film scoring ==
In the past years, Alan concentrated his career on producing music for films and television. His music and sound design has been heard on just about every TV channel on the planet as well as quite a few motion pictures and video games like the BAFTA award-winning "Bad Mutha Truckers 2" from Empire Interactive. Over 200 of his musical compositions have been featured in films, TV shows and video games. But Alan quickly came to realize that people enjoyed his soundtracks so much that his songs started to get 'bootlegged', copied and shared on the internet. He started getting a 'fan base' even though he had not released an actual album or single in ten years.

== Album releases ==
In 2007 Alan decided to once again 'step into the limelight'. He formed his own record label, Slim Chance Recordings and released his third album ‘Slim Chance and the Groove Enigma’ on that label. With the advent of iTunes and digital online distribution, Alan found that the timing was right for this venture. The single "Give it Up" from the "Slim Chance and the Groove Enigma" album was well received in the danceclubs and received worldwide airplay.

In 2008, Alan's fourth album, "The Jazz Masters" was released. A slight departure from Alan's trademark world-fusion electronica sound, the Jazz fusion album "The Jazz Masters" showcases the more jazzy side of Alan Steward, the kind of music he usually writes for movie and TV soundtracks. The album turned out to be his most successful album to date, being very popular on Smooth jazz radio stations in Europe.

Alan's major release for 2008 however was the album "Pop Icon". The single off the album was "Underdog" which Alan calls an ‘anthem for the anti-heroes’. "Underdog" is dedicated to all the independent musicians pursuing their dreams. "Pop Icon" also featured the vocal talents of Caribbean Soul Vocalist Tricia Hamilton on "Bad Boy Style" and UK House Diva Diane Gordon on a track called "Pfunked Up", a tribute to George Clinton and P-Funk.

Alan's 2009 album release is entitled "Licensed to Chill". This World fusion music album features vocals in five different languages and dialects and a mix of exotic sounds.

In 2011, he released the album ""The Temple of Boom"", similar in style to ""Licensed to Chill"", this album also features a variety of musical styles and exotic voices but also a forays into electronic dance, reggae and drum and bass. The album also features a new version of his song "Dream come true" from the Slim Chance album.

The 2013 album release "The very best of Alan Steward" features 21 songs in total from his last 5 album releases.

In 2018, the long-awaited album "Rise Up" is released. On this album that features mainly Reggae music, Alan takes a very different musical direction. This is also Alan's first album that features Alan's vocals on every single track.

== Discography ==
Rise Up - AbacoMedia - 2018
The very best of Alan Steward - Slim Chance Recordings - 2013
Temple of Boom - Slim Chance Recordings - 2011
Licensed to Chill - Slim Chance Recordings - 2009
Underdog (Single) - Slim Chance Recordings - 2008
Pop Icon - Slim Chance Recordings - 2008
The Jazz Masters - Slim Chance Recordings- 2008
Give it Up (Single) - Slim Chance Recordings- 2007
Slim Chance & the Groove Enigma (Album) - Slim Chance Recordings - 2007
G-Force - Sunshine Records - 1983
Just Listen - Live Album - 1976
