= Chris Geith =

Composer and arranger

- Genres: Jazz; smooth jazz; jazz fusion
- Occupations: Musician; composer; arranger
- Instruments: Piano, keyboards
- Years active: 1994–present
- Website: ChrisGeith.com

Chris Geith is a European keyboardist, composer, and arranger of contemporary jazz and instrumental music. He has performed with many well-known artists including Lee Ritenour, Peter White, Eric Marienthal, Warren Hill, Paul Taylor, Steve Oliver, Vincent Ingala, Euge Groove, and Mindi Abair.

His music has been heard extensively on The Weather Channel, Music Choice cable, Sirius XM radio, and on a number of different national TV shows including VH1 (Behind the Music), Inside Fame, PBS (Hometime); Discovery Health, Speed Channel (Autoline Detroit, My Classic Car), Animal Planet.

Chris has performed at numerous major jazz festivals and venues, including the Veneto Jazz Festival, the Seabreeze Jazz Festival, "Earl Klugh's Weekend of Jazz," the Wolf Creek Amphitheater Jazz Festival, Scullers in Boston, the Jazz Alley, and the Catalina Island Jazztrax festival.

== Discography ==
- Prime Time (2006)
- Timeless World (2007)
- Island of a Thousand Dreams (2010)
- Chasing Rainbows (2014)
- Well Tempered Love (2016)
- Invisible Reality (2021)
- Tales of Christmas (2022)
- Capture the Moment (2024)

== See also ==
- The Weather Channel Presents: Smooth Jazz II
- List of jazz arrangers
