= Dancing Fantasy =

German smooth jazz and new-age duo

Dancing Fantasy is a smooth jazz and new-age music band formed in 1990, consisting of German composers Curtis McLaw and Chris W. Williams. The band's music incorporates "elements of hip-hop and electronica" and occasionally includes vocals. They released their first album, Midnight Boulevard, in 1990. The duo released music on the Innovative Communication label.

The duo has also released songs under the names Blue Knights and Destination Fantasy.

== Discography ==
=== Albums ===
- Midnight Boulevard (1990), IC / Innovative Records
- California Grooves (1991), Innovative Records
- Moonlight Reflections (1992), IC / Innovative Records
- Worldwide (1993), IC / Digit Music
- Day Dream (1995), Orchard
- Live USA (1995), Innovative Records
- Love Letters (1997), IC / Innovative Records
- Dancing Fantasy (1999), Higher Octave
- Soundscapes (2001), 1201 Music
- Back Home (2015), Audio & Video Labs, Inc.

== Singles ==
- Turn Back Time (2026), Dancing Fantasy Music.
- Moments In Love, Dancing Fantasy Music.
