= Jay Soto =

American jazz musician

Jay Soto (born October 24, 1972) is an American smooth jazz guitarist.

== Biography ==
At age 5, Soto began studying drums, followed by classical piano at age 7, then guitar at age 12.

In 2004, Soto won the local, district and regional rounds in Guitar Center's Guitarmageddon competition. This lead him to the finals at Eric Clapton's Crossroads Guitar festival in Dallas, Texas where he finished as one of the top guitarists in the nation. Also in 2004, Soto sang "The Star-Spangled Banner" for President George W. Bush at the Memorial Coliseum in Phoenix, Arizona.

In 2005, Soto released his first album, Long Time Coming, and two years later signed with the smooth jazz label, Nu Groove. His self-produced debut led to his meeting producers Jeff Lorber and Paul Brown, who helped produce Soto's second album, Stay Awhile.

Soto's 2007 single, "Slammin", was listed in the top 5 on Radio and Records's Smooth Jazz Chart.

He has had song placements in HBO's Sex and the City and The Weather Channel and has been featured in JazzTimes and 20th Century Guitar. He has played with Michael Lington, Jeff Lorber, Paul Brown, Marion Meadows, Euge Groove, Jeffrey Osborne, Craig Chaquico, Acoustic Alchemy, and Peter White.

== Discography ==
- Long Time Coming (SotoPop, 2005)
- Stay Awhile (nuGroove, 2007)
- Mesmerized (nuGroove, 2009)
- On the Verge (Innervision, 2018)
