= Jonathan Fritzén =

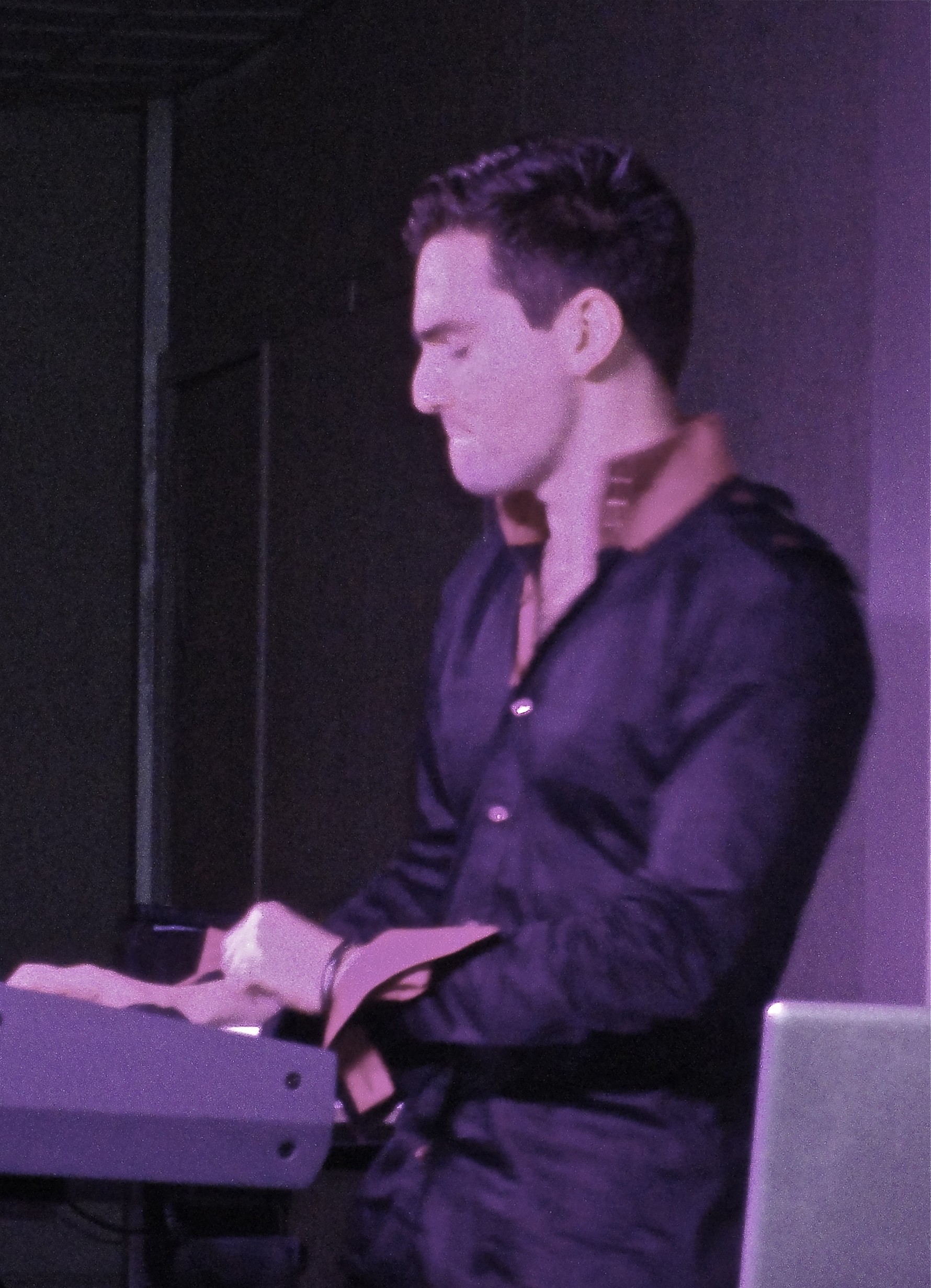

Background information
- Born: Jonathan Fritzén; October 11, 1982 (age 43)
- Origin: Stockholm, Sweden
- Genres: Smooth jazz, contemporary jazz
- Occupations: Musician, composer, producer
- Instrument: Piano
- Years active: 2008–present
- Website: jonathanfritzen.com

Jonathan Fritzen (born October 11, 1982) is a Swedish contemporary jazz pianist and multi-instrumentalist.

== Biography ==
Fritzen was born in Stockholm, Sweden to a Swedish mother, flutist Katarina Fritzén, and an American father, composer Steve Dobrogosz. He started playing drums at a young age, and as he got older he also learned the piano, bass, guitar, flute and vocals. His formal music education comes from the Royal Swedish Academy of Music in Stockholm, where he became one of the first students to receive a master's degree from the jazz department.

His debut solo album, Love Birds was released in 2008. Besides playing piano, he did all the composing, producing and played all eight different instruments.

Fritzen's second album VIP (2009) features vocalist Laila Adele, guitarist Jay Soto, saxophone players Michael Lington and Greger Hillman. The album spent 40 weeks on the Smoothjazz.com TOP 50.

His third album Diamonds (2010) features saxophone players Darren Rahn, Jessy J and Koh (aka Mr. Saxman), vocalist Laila Adele and guitarist Alex Crown. The first single Dance With Me spent 10 weeks at No. 1 on the Billboard Indicator Smooth Jazz Chart, and his second single Undercover made it to No. 2 on the same Chart. Diamonds also made the top −10 on the Smoothjazz.com Chart, and hit No. 1 on Amazon.com in "Bestsellers in Smooth Jazz".

His fourth album, "Magical", was released in August 2012, and features several different artists, such as Boney James, Jackiem Joyner, and Vincent Ingala.

His fifth album, "Fritzenized", was released in February 2015, and features artists like Gerald Albright, Paul Taylor, Nils Landgren and many more.

His sixth album, “Ballads”, was released in July 2017.

His seventh album, “Bach and Jazz” was released in November 2020.

His eighth album, “Piano Tales”, was released in May 2022.

Fritzen has performed in several countries including Sweden, United States, United Kingdom, Switzerland, Spain and Thailand.

== Discography ==
| release date | album title | label | notes |
|---|---|---|---|
| 2008, July 15 | Love Birds | Nordic Night Records | |
| 2009, May 22 | VIP | Nordic Night Records | |
| 2010, June 19 | Diamonds | Nordic Night Records | |
| 2012, August 21 | Magical | Nordic Night Records | |
| 2015, February 10 | Fritzenized | Nordic Night Records | |
| 2017, July 27 | Ballads | Nordic Night Records | |
