= Paula Atherton =

American jazz saxophonist

- Born: New York City, NY
- Genres: Jazz
- Occupations: Vocalist, musician
- Instrument: Saxophone
- Years active: 2000–Present
- Labels: Kalimba Music
- Website: paulaatherton.com

Paula Atherton is an American jazz saxophonist.

== Career ==
Born and raised in Massapequa Park, Long Island, NY, Atherton began playing the flute at the age of nine and then the saxophone during her teen years. She became further interested in jazz soon afterwards. As a jazz vocalist/musician, Atherton was influenced by artists such as Billie Holiday, Charlie Parker, Cannonball Adderley and David Sanborn.

== Discography ==
=== Singles ===
Year	Single	Chart positions
Year	Single	US Jazz
2013	"Sassy Strut"	15
2013	"Herbie"	21
2016	"Between You & Me"	21
2017	"Girl Talk" (Cindy Bradley feat. Paula Atherton)	2
2018	"My Song for You"	18

=== Credits ===
Year	Album	Artist	
2020	Colors	Roberto Tola	Flute, Soloist
2017	Natural	Cindy Bradley	Sax (Alto)
2014	Jazzboy	Dino Fiumara	Primary Artist
2012	WO!: Bobby Susser Songs for Children	Bobby Susser	Flute, Penny Whistle, Sax (Alto), Featured Artist, Vocals
2012	Good Medicine	Ty Stephens	Soloist
2009	America: An Album for All Ages	The Bobby Susser Singers	Featured Artist
2008	All Roads Lead to Home	Bobby Susser	Main Personnel, Vocals
1996	Some Like It Hot	Kit McClure Big Band / Kit McClure	Vocals, Sax (Alto), Vocals (Background)
