= Michael J Thomas =

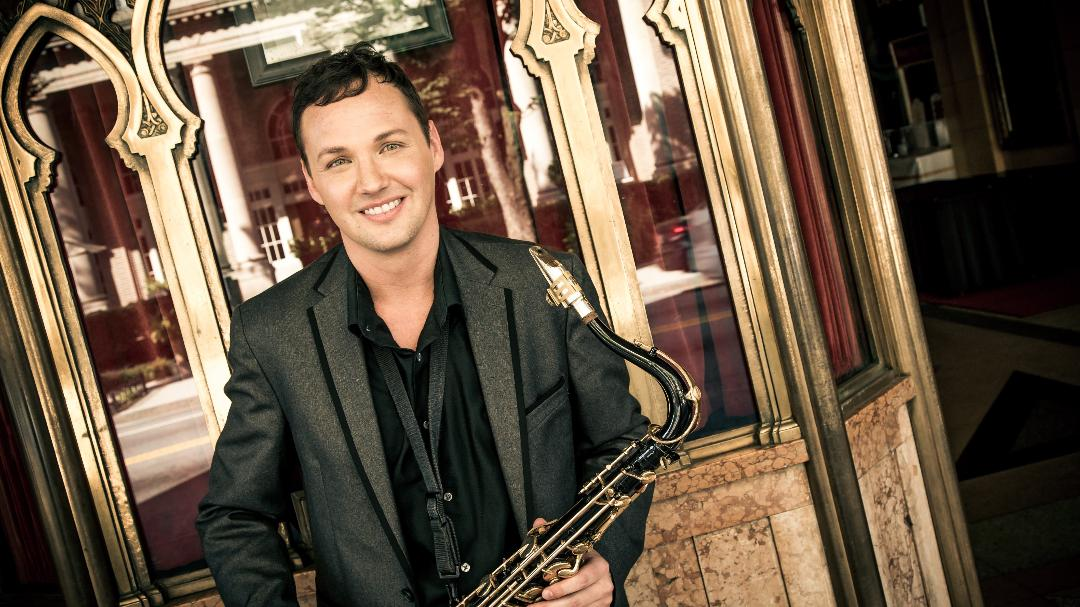

Background information
- Genres: Jazz, Contemporary Jazz, R&B
- Occupation: Contemporary Jazz Musician
- Instruments: Soprano Saxophone, Alto Saxophone, Tenor Saxophone
- Years active: 2010–present
- Website: https://michaeljthomas.net

Michael J Thomas is an American saxophonist, songwriter, and vocalist.

== Life and career ==
Thomas joined the Jive Rockets, which opened for the Brian Setzer Orchestra, Big Bad Voo Doo Daddy, and Bill Haley's Original Comets.

Thomas released his first solo album, City Beat, in 2010, and wrote or co-wrote nine of the ten songs on the album. The track "Amante Del Vino" was featured in the movie Contagion. Thomas had his vocal debut in 2011 with a single titled “I Think About Amy,” which was released on Woodward Avenue Records and hit #16 on the Billboard Smooth Jazz Airplay chart.

His album, Driven, was released on Harbor Breeze Records in 2017, and Thomas was involved in the writing on all of the tracks. The lead single, "Baby Coffee", hit #1 on Billboard's Smooth Jazz Chart for four weeks. It was also a song of the day on Jazziz.

His cover of "I'll Never Love Again" from the movie A Star is Born earned him another #1 on Billboard's Smooth Jazz Charts. In 2020, Thomas released the EP, Stream'n Love with the lead single, "Sippin' The Yak", written by Thomas and Trammell Starks.

== Discography ==
Year	Title	Record label
2010	City Beat	Harbor Breeze Records
2011	I Think About Amy - Single	Woodward Avenue Records
2017	Driven	Harbor Breeze Records
2019	I'll Never Love Again - Single	Harbor Breeze Records
2020	Stream'n Love - EP	Harbor Breeze Records
