= Pamela Williams =

American jazz saxophonist

- Born: December 28, 1963 (age 62); Philadelphia, Pennsylvania, U.S.
- Genres: Smooth jazz
- Occupation: Musician
- Instrument: Saxophone
- Years active: 1996–present
- Labels: Shanachie, Heads Up
- Website: www.pamelawilliamsthesaxtress.com

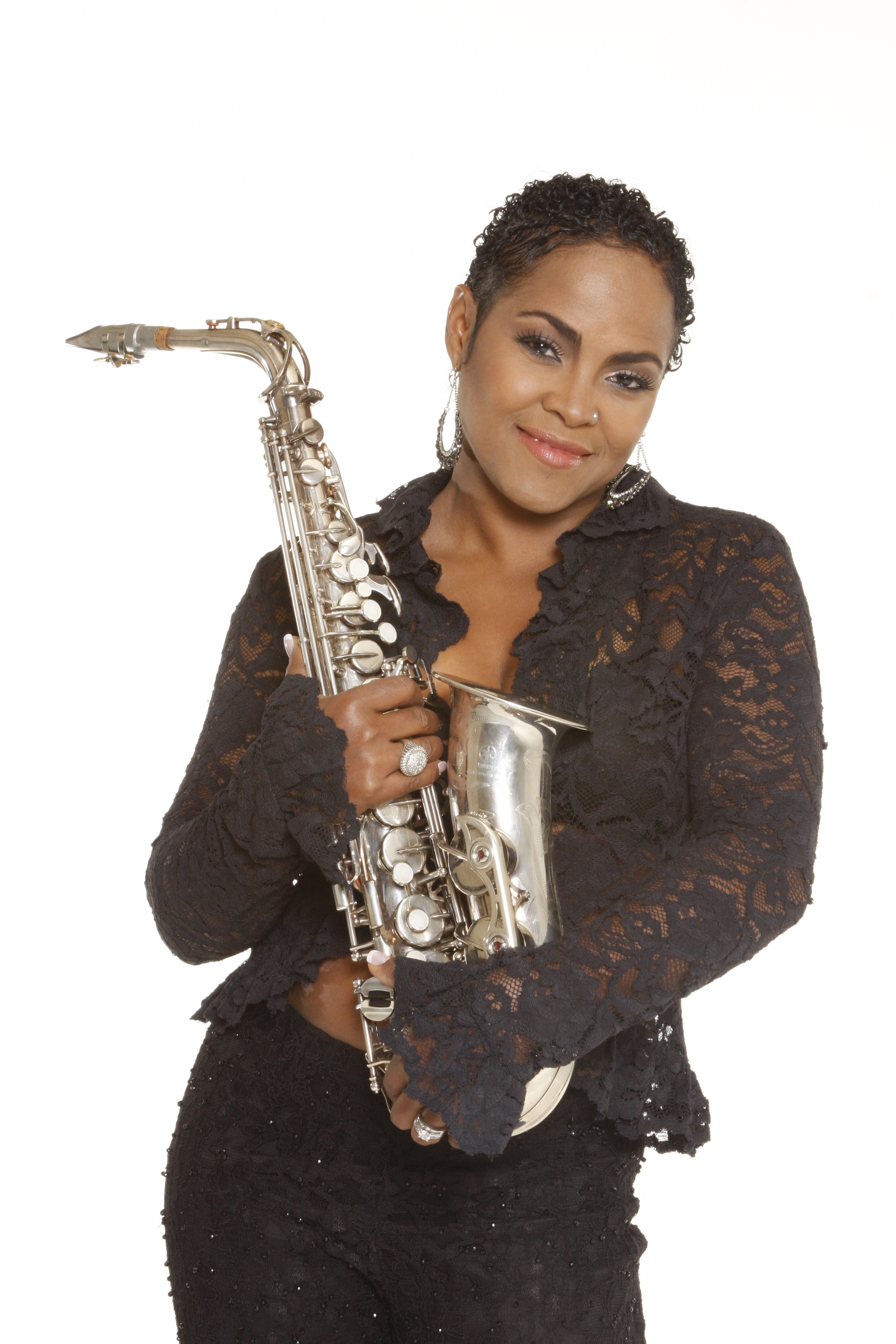

Pamela Williams (born 1963) is an American smooth jazz saxophonist. Her music employs nu Jazz, funk, R&B, house, Latin and pop.

== Biography ==
Williams grew up in Philadelphia, Pennsylvania, which was also the adopted hometown of an early influence of hers, Grover Washington, Jr. Playing with the Martin Luther King Jr Jazz Ensemble at King High School in Philadelphia's historic Germantown section, Williams was required to embrace both electric jazz-funk and hardcore bebop. In 1996, she first found fame as a member of Patti LaBelle's backup band, furthering her subsequent career. Williams has toured with Teena Marie and performed with Prince, Babyface and Chante Moore. She has appeared in music videos by artists ranging from Barry White ("Come On") to rapper/actress Queen Latifah ("Hard Times").

In 1996, Williams made her recording debut, Saxtress™, which was the "Top Contemporary Jazz Album", Billboard's Top 10 pick. A cover of Quincy Jones' "The Secret Garden (Sweet Seduction Suite)" includes guest performances by female soul vocalists Pat Peterson, Patti LaBelle, and Teena Marie; Teena Marie is also heard on "Latin Lullaby." The album also earned Williams a nomination for the Soul Train Lady of Soul Awards and the title of "Best Female Contemporary Jazz Artist" in 1996. Her subsequent recordings include Eight Days of Ecstasy (1998), Evolution (2002) (on which Williams performed vocals and keyboards, along with alto and soprano saxophone), The Perfect Love (2003), Sweet Saxations (2005), and Elixir (2006). In 2007 she recorded The Look of Love, featuring songs originally recorded by Dionne Warwick, and written by Burt Bacharach and Hal David. In November 2009, Williams released a Nu Jazz CD, Chameleon, the first release from her own indie label Saxtress™ Entertainment.

== Discography ==
Year	Title	Genre	Label
1996	Saxtress	Jazz	Heads Up
1998	Eight Days of Ecstasy	Jazz	Heads Up
2002	Evolution	R&B, Soul, Jazz	Red Int / Red Ink
2003	The Perfect Love	Jazz	Shanachie
2005	Sweet Saxations	Jazz	Shanachie
2006	Elixir	Jazz	Shanachie
2006	Pamela Williams: A Night with the Saxtress	Jazz	Shanachie
2007	The Look of Love	Funk	Shanachie
2009	Chameleon	Nu Jazz	Saxtress Entertainment
