= 3rd Force =

Smooth jazz band

- Genres: Smooth jazz
- Years active: 1994–present
- Label: Higher Octave
- Members: William Aura; Craig Dobbin; Alain Eskinasi
- Website: www.3rdforcemusic.com

3rd Force is a smooth jazz band consisting of William Aura, Craig Dobbin, and Alain Eskinasi.

The band's eponymous first album was released in 1994. It was followed by others with "Force" in the title. "3rd Force is considerably more eclectic than most artists who fit into smooth jazz radio formats; in fact, their work often straddles the line between smooth jazz and dance-heavy, electronic-tinged acid jazz, sometimes incorporating ethnic influences as well."

== Discography ==
- 3rd Force (1994)
- Force of Nature (1995)
- Vital Force (1997)
- Force Field (1999)
- Collective Force (2000)
- Gentle Force (2002)
- Driving Force (2005)
- Global Force (2016)
- Lifeforce (2025)

== See also ==
- List of ambient music artists
