= Will Donato =

Will Donato is a smooth jazz composer, alto saxophonist and recording artist whose 2007 release, Will Call is his first with Innervision Records. His "Infinite Soul" reached No. 1 on the Billboard Smooth Jazz Airplay chart in 2019. His "You Got This" was No. 31 on the Billboard Smooth Jazz Songs year-end chart of 2020.

== Discography ==
- Elevate - 2020 (Innervision Records)
- Supersonic - 2017 (Innervision Records)
- Universal Groove - 2014 (Innervision Records)
- Best of the Season - 2011 (Innervision Records)
- What It Takes - 2010 (Innervision Records)
- Laws of Attraction - 2009 (Innervision Records)
- Will Call - 2007 (Innervision Records)
- Will Power - 2004 (Generation Records)
- Portrait (with 'The Art of Sax') - 2002
- The Art of Sax
- Speak My Heart
