= Eric Darius =

American musician, songwriter, and educator

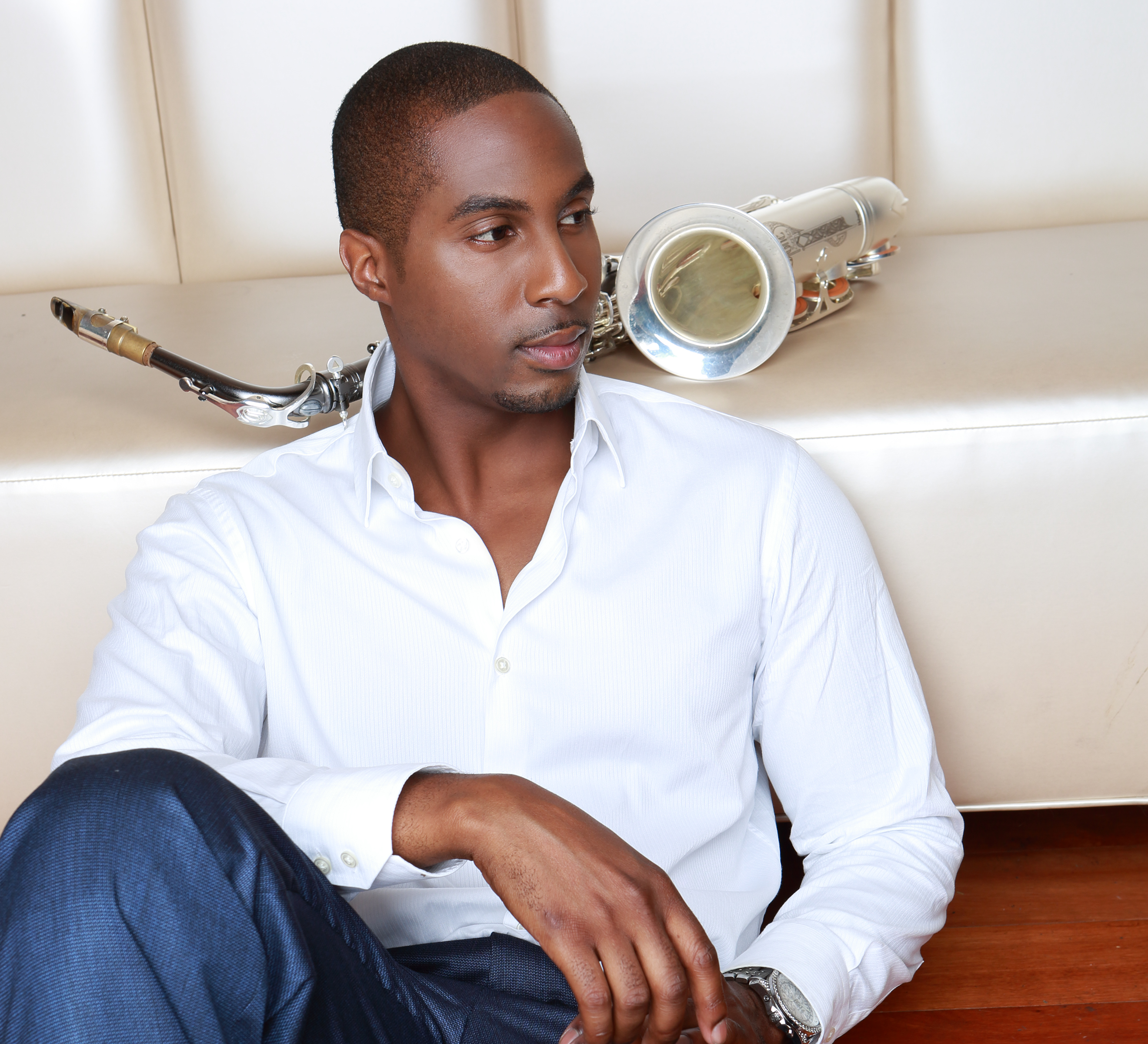

Background information
- Born: December 3, 1982 (age 43); Livingston, New Jersey, U.S.
- Genres: Jazz, contemporary jazz, smooth jazz, R&B, pop
- Occupation: Musician
- Instrument: Saxophone
- Years active: 1982–present
- Labels: SagiDarius, Blue Note, Shanachie, Narada, Higher Octave
- Website: ericdarius.com

Eric Darius (born December 3, 1982), is an American saxophonist, vocalist, songwriter, producer, and educator.

== Early life ==
Darius was born in New Jersey to a father of Haitian descent and a mother of Jamaican descent. He grew up in Tampa, Florida. Born into a musical family, his father plays bass, his mother and sister sing, and his older brother plays drums and trumpet. Darius grew up listening to Stevie Wonder, Michael Jackson, Earth, Wind and Fire, Marvin Gaye, Al Green, Grover Washington, Jr., David Sanborn, George Benson, and Bob Marley. He developed a love and appreciation for music at an early age, as his parents exposed him to music from many genres. The first time he saw someone playing saxophone was when in church when he was nine years old. He fell in love with the sound. His parents bought him a saxophone for his birthday.

He began his performing career at the age of 11, when he joined and toured with Sonny LaRosa and America's Youngest Jazz Band. The band included kids from the ages of five to twelve and toured worldwide, playing music by Duke Ellington, Count Basie, and Louis Armstrong. While performing with the band at the Montreux Jazz Festival, he decided to pursue a career in music.

At thirteen he left the youth band and his father became his manager. He started performing in Tampa Bay with his own band. As a teenager he performed over 100 shows per year. He attended Howard W. Blake High School of the Performing Arts. In high school he participated in music and sports. He performed with the Blake High School jazz band at the Essentially Ellington contest and festival at Lincoln Center. At seventeen he released his first album independently.

Darius attended the University of South Florida in Tampa, where he studied business and music. He studied jazz under the direction of Chuck Owens and Jack Wilkins and was a member of the university's Jazztet, which performed at the Montreaux Jazz Festival, North Sea Jazz Festival, Jazz à Vienne, and the Umbria Jazz Festival. During college, he signed a recording contract with Higher Octave Music.

== Career ==
His debut album Night on the Town was released in 2004 by Higher Octave and peaked at No. 32 on the jazz albums chart at Billboard magazine. This was followed by Just Getting Started, peaking at No. 18 (2006), Goin' All Out at 14 (2008), On a Mission at 10 (Shanachie, 2010), Retro Forward at 15 (2014), and Breakin' Thru at 19 (2018). The single "Goin' All Out" reached No. 1 on the Contemporary Jazz chart during the week of October 25, 2008.

His performance at the Catalina Island JazzTrax Festival earned him the JazzTrax Best Live Performance of the Year and the Smooth Jazz News Debut Artist of the Year.

== Discography ==
=== Albums ===
Release	Title	Peak chart positions		Label
Release	Title	US Jazz	US Con. Jazz	Label
March 16, 2000	Cruisin'	—	—	Smooth Breeze
June 29, 2004	Night on the Town	32	18	Higher Octave
March 7, 2006	Just Getting Started	18	8	Narada
June 24, 2008	Goin' All Out	14	9	Blue Note
June 29, 2010	On a Mission	10	3	Shanachie
November 11, 2014	Retro Forward	15	6	Shanachie
May 12, 2017	Breakin' Thru	13	7	SagiDarius
August 12, 2022	Unleashed	—	—	SagiDarius
"—" denotes a recording that did not chart.

=== Singles ===
Year	Title	Peak chart positions	Album
Year	Title	Smooth Jazz Airplay	Album
2006	"If I Ain't Got You"	12	Just Getting Started
2006	"Chillin' Out"	22	Just Getting Started
2006	"Steppin' Up"	29	Just Getting Started
2006	"Slick"	17	Just Getting Started
2008	"Goin' All Out"	1	Goin' All Out
2009	"Because of You"	14	Goin' All Out
2010	"Uptown Swagger"	15	On a Mission
2011	"Settin' It Off"	28	On a Mission
2011	"Soulful Stride"	13	On a Mission
2014	"Happy"	27	Retro Forward
2016	"35th Street" (Adam Hawley featuring Eric Darius)	1	Just the Beginning – (Adam Hawley)
2017	"Breakin' Thru"	5	Breakin' Thru
2018	"Dare 2 Dream"	8	Breakin' Thru
2019	"L.O.V.E." (Eric Darius featuring Brian Culbertson)	18	Breakin' Thru
2019	"Fired Up" (Eric Darius featuring Rodney Jones Jr. and André Troutman)	3	Breakin' Thru
2020	"Summer Feelin'" (Eric Darius featuring Paul Jackson Jr.)	13	Unleashed
2021	"Let's Go" (Brian Culbertson featuring Eric Darius)	8	Music from The Hang – (Brian Culbertson)
2022	"That's My Jam" (Eric Darius featuring Justin Lee Schultz)	5	Unleashed
2023	"Bottle Up Magic" (Rebecca Jade featuring Eric Darius)	19	A Shade of Jade – (Rebecca Jade)
2025	"Too Good 2 Let Go"	1	TBA
2026	"Maputo Nights"	1	TBA
