= Everette Harp =

American jazz saxophonist (born 1961)

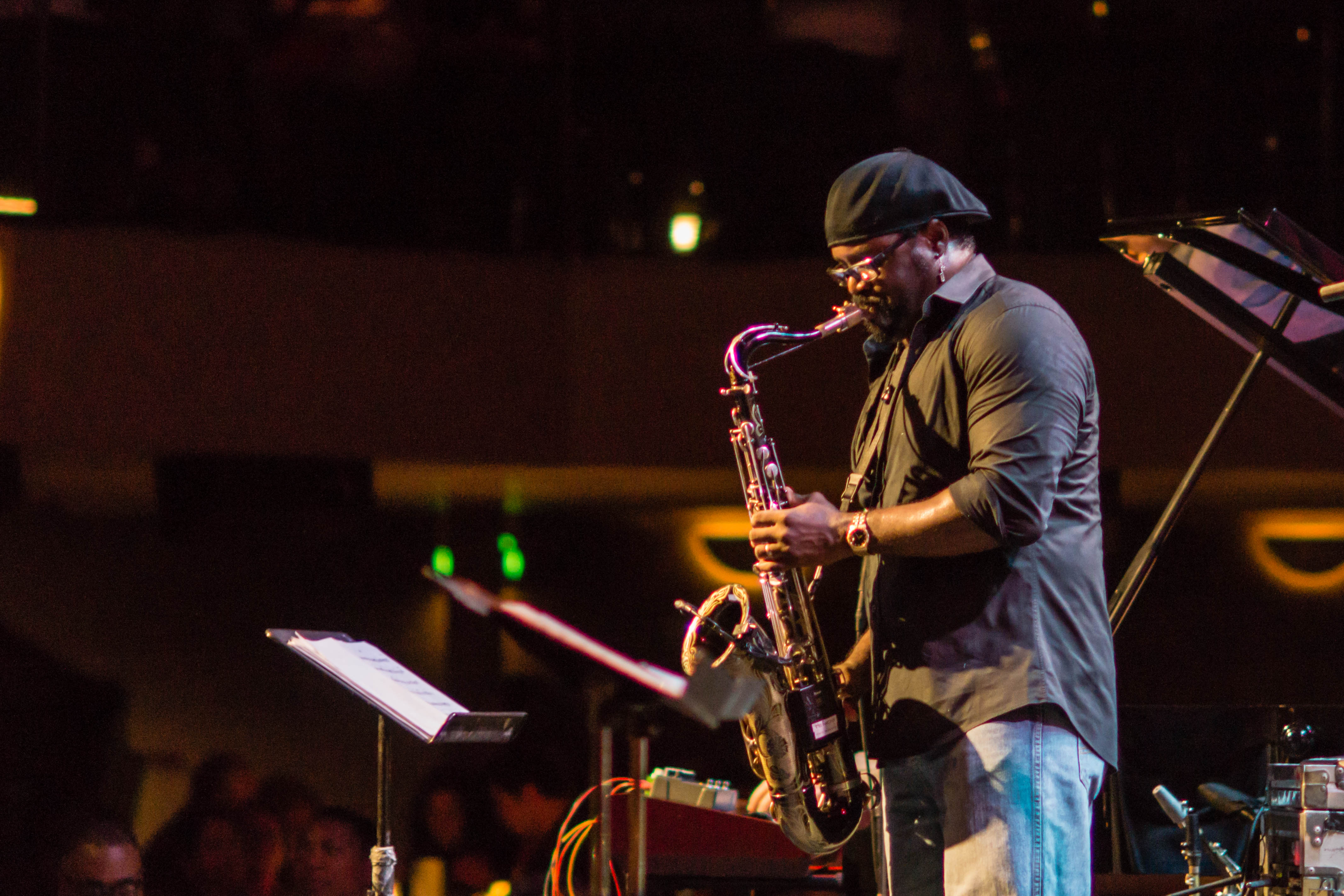

Background information
- Born: August 17, 1961 (age 65); Houston, Texas, U.S.
- Genres: Jazz
- Occupation: Musician
- Instrument: Saxophone
- Years active: 1981–present
- Labels: Blue Note; Capitol; Shanachie
- Website: everetteharp.com

Everette Harp (born August 17, 1961, in Houston, Texas) is an American jazz saxophonist who has recorded for Blue Note, Capitol and Shanachie Records. His album Jazz Funk Soul, a collaboration with Chuck Loeb and Jeff Lorber, received his first nomination for a Grammy Award for Best Contemporary Instrumental Album at 57th Annual Grammy Awards.

== Career ==
Everette Harp is the youngest of eight children. His father was a minister and his mother played the organ. Gospel music was one of his earliest influences. He started playing jazz in middle school at Marshall Junior High under the tutelage of drummer Buddy Smith. He attended the High School for Performing and Visual Arts in Houston under the direction of Robert "Doc" Morgan", then North Texas State University as a music major in the early 1980s. While there he joined Phi Beta Sigma. Working as an accountant for a short time, Harp played in local Houston bands, most notably a jazz/funk group called The Franchise which released an album locally with the first recording of Harp's "There's Still Hope" in 1987.

In 1988 he moved to Los Angeles and toured briefly with Teena Marie and then Anita Baker. Two years later George Duke signed him to a contract with Capitol Records to record with his group 101 North. Bruce Lundvall of Blue Note Records signed Harp to a solo contract before the group album was released. Harp's album was produced by Duke and released by Blue Note in 1992.

Harp appeared at the Montreux Jazz Festival as a featured guest artist presented by Duke. He appeared every week on The Arsenio Hall Show. His appearance on Sax by the Fire, produced by John Tesh, led to his performing on the theme song for Entertainment Tonight, produced by and starring Tesh. He also played on the theme song for Soul Train and shared the stage with President Bill Clinton at the Arkansas Ball in 1992.

Harp worked with Stanley Clarke, Natalie Cole, Neil Diamond, Aretha Franklin, Wayne Henderson, Al Jarreau, The Jazz Crusaders, Billy Joel, Chaka Khan, Kenny Loggins, Bobby Lyle, Peter Maffay, Marcus Miller, Chante Moore, Dianne Reeves, Eros Ramazzotti, Brenda Russell, Joe Sample, and Luther Vandross.

He continued his television and studio recording obligations and his solo recording career. During the 1990s he became a staple in the Los Angeles TV and recording studio scene, showing up on many recordings becoming a favorite of such producers as Kenny "Babyface" Edmonds, Peter Wolf, Peter Asher and Barry Eastmond. He appeared on several television shows, including The Tonight Show with Johnny Carson and with Jay Leno, The Arsenio Hall Show, and The Tavis Smiley Show. In later years Harp reduced his side gigs to focus on his solo career.

Harp collaborated with guitarist Chuck Loeb and keyboardist Jeff Lorber and formed a group Jazz Funk Soul. The trio has released two studio albums, Jazz Funk Soul in 2014 and More Serious Business in 2016. Loeb died of cancer on July 31, 2017, at the age of 61.

== Discography ==
=== Studio albums ===
List of albums, with selected chart positions and certifications
| Title | Album details | Peak chart positions | | | | |
| Title | Album details | US R&B | US Jazz | US Con. Jazz | US Indie | US Heat |
|---|---|---|---|---|---|---|
| Everette Harp | Released: 1992; Label: Blue Note | 54 | — | 6 | — | 16 |
| Common Ground | Released: 1994; Label: Blue Note | 44 | 6 | 5 | — | 20 |
| What's Going On | Released: 1997; Label: Blue Note | — | 8 | 6 | — | — |
| Better Days | Released: October 20, 1998; Label: Blue Note | — | 12 | 8 | — | — |
| For the Love | Released: October 24, 2000; Label: Blue Note | — | 14 | 10 | — | — |
| All for You | Released: July 20, 2004; Label: A440 Records | 56 | 22 | 14 | — | — |
| In the Moment | Released: May 23, 2006; Label: Shanachie | — | 4 | 1 | 44 | 46 |
| My Inspiration | Released: August 28, 2007; Label: Shanachie | — | 7 | 2 | — | 22 |
| First Love | Released: October 27, 2009; Label: Shanachie | — | 21 | 9 | — | — |
"—" denotes releases that did not chart or were not released in that territory.

=== Jazz Funk Soul – collaboration albums ===
List of albums, with selected chart positions and certifications
| Title | Album details | Peak chart positions | | | | |
| Title | Album details | US R&B | US Jazz | US Con. Jazz | US Indie | US Heat |
|---|---|---|---|---|---|---|
| Jazz Funk Soul | Released: April 29, 2014; Label: Shanachie | — | 5 | 2 | — | — |
| More Serious Business | Released: January 22, 2016; Label: Shanachie | — | 7 | 2 | — | — |
| Life and Times | Released: January 25, 2019; Label: Shanachie | — | 6 | 2 | — | — |
| Forecast | Released: June 7, 2022; Label: Shanachie | — | — | — | — | — |
| Simpatico | Released: July 11, 2025; Label: Shanachie | — | — | — | — | — |
"—" denotes releases that did not chart or were not released in that territory.

=== Other collaborations ===
- Marcus Miller ("Under the Sky") (1991)
- Kenny Loggins ("What's Going On") (1997)
- Billy Joel ("Hey Girl") (1997)
- Regina Belle ("Lazy Afternoon") (2004)
- Forever, For Always, For Luther (2004)
- "Wholly Holy"
- Yolanda Adams ("Wholly Holy") (1997)
- Nikkole ("Love Was Made in Heaven") (2009)

=== Charted singles ===
| Year | Title | Peak chart positions | | Album |
| Year | Title | Hot R&B/ Hip-Hop Songs | Smooth Jazz Airplay | Album |
|---|---|---|---|---|
| 1992 | "Let's Wait Awhile" | 80 | —N/a | Everette Harp |
| 2006 | "Monday Speaks" | — | 22 | In the Moment |
| 2007 | "Just As You Are" | — | 26 | In the Moment |
| 2007 | "Old School" | — | 4 | My Inspiration |
| 2010 | "Texas Groove" | — | 23 | First Love |
| 2020 | "Keep Movin'" – (Brian Culbertson featuring Everette Harp) | — | 1 | (Brian Culbertson) – XX |
| 2022 | "Q's Vibe" – (Eric Valentine featuring Everette Harp and Greg Manning) | — | 1 | Non-album single |
| 2026 | "Electric" – (Adam Hawley feat. Everette Harp) | | 1 | (Adam Hawley) – Electric |
"—" denotes releases that did not chart or were not released in that territory.

=== Jazz Funk Soul – collaboration singles ===
| Year | Title | Peak chart positions | Album |
| Year | Title | Smooth Jazz Airplay | Album |
|---|---|---|---|
| 2014 | "Serious Business" | 1 | Jazz Funk Soul |
| 2015 | "Speed of Light" | 20 | Jazz Funk Soul |
| 2016 | "You'll Know When You Know" | 21 | More Serious Business |
| 2017 | "Tuesday Swings" | 7 | More Serious Business |
| 2019 | "Windfall" | 3 | Life and Times |
| 2019 | "Blacksmith" | 23 | Life and Times |
| 2022 | "Hustle" | 4 | Forecast |
| 2023 | "Forecast" | 7 | Forecast |
| 2025 | "Over Easy" | 4 | Simpatico |
| 2026 | "Simpatico" | 6 | Simpatico |
"—" denotes releases that did not chart or were not released in that territory.
