= Chris Standring =

British jazz guitarist (born 1960)

- Born: 1960 (age 65–66); Buckinghamshire, England
- Genres: Soul jazz, smooth jazz
- Occupation: Musician
- Instrument: Guitar
- Formerly of: SolarSystem
- Website: chrisstandring.com

Chris Standring (born 1 December 1960) is a British jazz guitarist known for his heavy use of 1970s-style musical nuances. Before launching his solo career with his 1998 album Velvet, he represented a third of the band SolarSystem, a band that combined elements of jazz and hip-hop.

== Solo career ==
His solo debut Velvet was followed two years later by Hip Sway, co-produced with Rodney Lee. Groovalicious followed in 2003, then Soul Express in 2006. Love & Paragraphs (2008) spawned the title track hit radio single. Blue Bolero spawned the hit single "Bossa Blue" which went to No. 1 on contemporary radio across the US and stayed there for nine consecutive weeks. "Bossa Blue" was named 2010 Billboard contemporary jazz track of the year. Electric Wonderland was released on 20 March 2012.

Strandring continues to release new material regularly. "Change the World" from Simple Things (2022) and "Top Hat & Tails" from As We Think (2024) both reached No. 1 in the Smooth Jazz Airplay chart. Time of Change (2026) is his 18th full length solo album.

== Discography ==
=== Studio albums ===
year	title	label	notes
1989	Main Course	Ultimate Vibe	the early tapes, recorded 1989, released 2011
1996	Solar System	Sonic Images	recorded as the 'Solar System' group
1998	Velvet	Instinct	
2000	Hip Sway	Instinct	
2003	Groovalicious	Pyramid Media Group	
2006	Soul Express	Trippin n Rhythm	reissued on Ultimate Vibe in 2018
2008	Love & Paragraphs	Ultimate Vibe	Standring's own label
2010	Blue Bolero	Ultimate Vibe	
2011	Send Me Some Snow	Ultimate Vibe	featuring Kathrin Shorr
2012	Electric Wonderland	Ultimate Vibe	
2014	Don't Talk, Dance!	Ultimate Vibe	
2016	Ten	Ultimate Vibe	
2018	Sunlight	Ultimate Vibe	
2020	Real Life	Ultimate Vibe	
2021	Wonderful World	Ultimate Vibe	Chris Standring Trio & Orchestra
2022	Simple Things	Ultimate Vibe	
2022	Silent Night	Ultimate Vibe	
2024	As We Think	Ultimate Vibe	
2026	Time of Change	Ultimate Vibe	

=== Live albums ===
year	title	label	notes
2017	Live in London	Ultimate Vibe	

=== Compilation albums ===
year	title	label	notes
2014	Collector's Series		
2019	Best of Chris Standring – Remixed	Ultimate Vibe	
2023	The Lovers Remix Collection	Ultimate Vibe	

=== Charted albums ===
Year	Title	Peak chart positions		Label
Year	Title	US Jazz	US Con. Jazz	Label
2006	Soul Express	44	20	Trippin n Rhythm
2008	Love and Paragraphs	15	7	Ultimate Vibe
2010	Blue Bolero	—	24	Ultimate Vibe
2012	Electric Wonderland	15	4	Ultimate Vibe
2014	Don't Talk, Dance!	10	4	Ultimate Vibe
2016	Ten	12	5	Ultimate Vibe
2018	Sunlight	7	1	Ultimate Vibe
2019	Best of Chris Standring – Remixed	24	11	Ultimate Vibe
2020	Real Life	—	12	Ultimate Vibe
"—" denotes a recording that did not chart.

=== Charted singles ===
Year	Title	Peak chart positions	Album
Year	Title	Smooth Jazz Airplay	Album
2006	"I Can't Help Myself"	18	Soul Express
2008	"Love & Paragraphs"	2	Love and Paragraphs
2008	"Have Your Cake & Eat It"	15	Love and Paragraphs
2010	"Bossa Blue"	1	Blue Bolero
2010	"Fast Train to Everywhere"	14	Blue Bolero
2012	"Oliver's Twist"	1	Electric Wonderland
2012	"Pandora's Box"	10	Electric Wonderland
2014	"Sneakin' Out the Front Door"	1	Don't Talk, Dance!
2014	"Imagine That"	15	Don't Talk, Dance!
2016	"Ready Steady Flow"	2	Ten
2016	"Soul Vibration"	2	Ten
2017	"Like This, Like That"	1	Ten
2017	"Category A" (Cindy Bradley featuring Chris Standring)	1	Natural – (Cindy Bradley)
2017	"Piccadilly Circus" (Paul Brown featuring Chris Standring)	1	One Way Back – (Paul Brown)
2018	"Love Street"	6	Sunlight
2018	"Like Paradise"	15	Sunlight
2019	"Static in the Attic"	9	Sunlight
2019	"Kaleidoscope (2019)"	4	Best of Chris Standring – Remixed
2020	"Is There a Doctor in the House?"	1	Real Life
2020	"Shake You Up"	1	Real Life
2021	"Whatever She Wants"	8	Real Life
2022	"Change the World"	1	Simple Things
2022	"Shadow of Doubt"	13	Simple Things
2023	"Face to Face"	21	Simple Things
2023	"Liquid Soul (Lovers Remix)"	6	The Lovers Remix Collection
2024	"Alphabet Soup"	7	As We Think
2025	"Top Hat & Tails"	1	As We Think
2025	"Chocolate Shake"	2	As We Think
2026	"All the Good Times"	3	Time of Change
