= Lin Rountree =

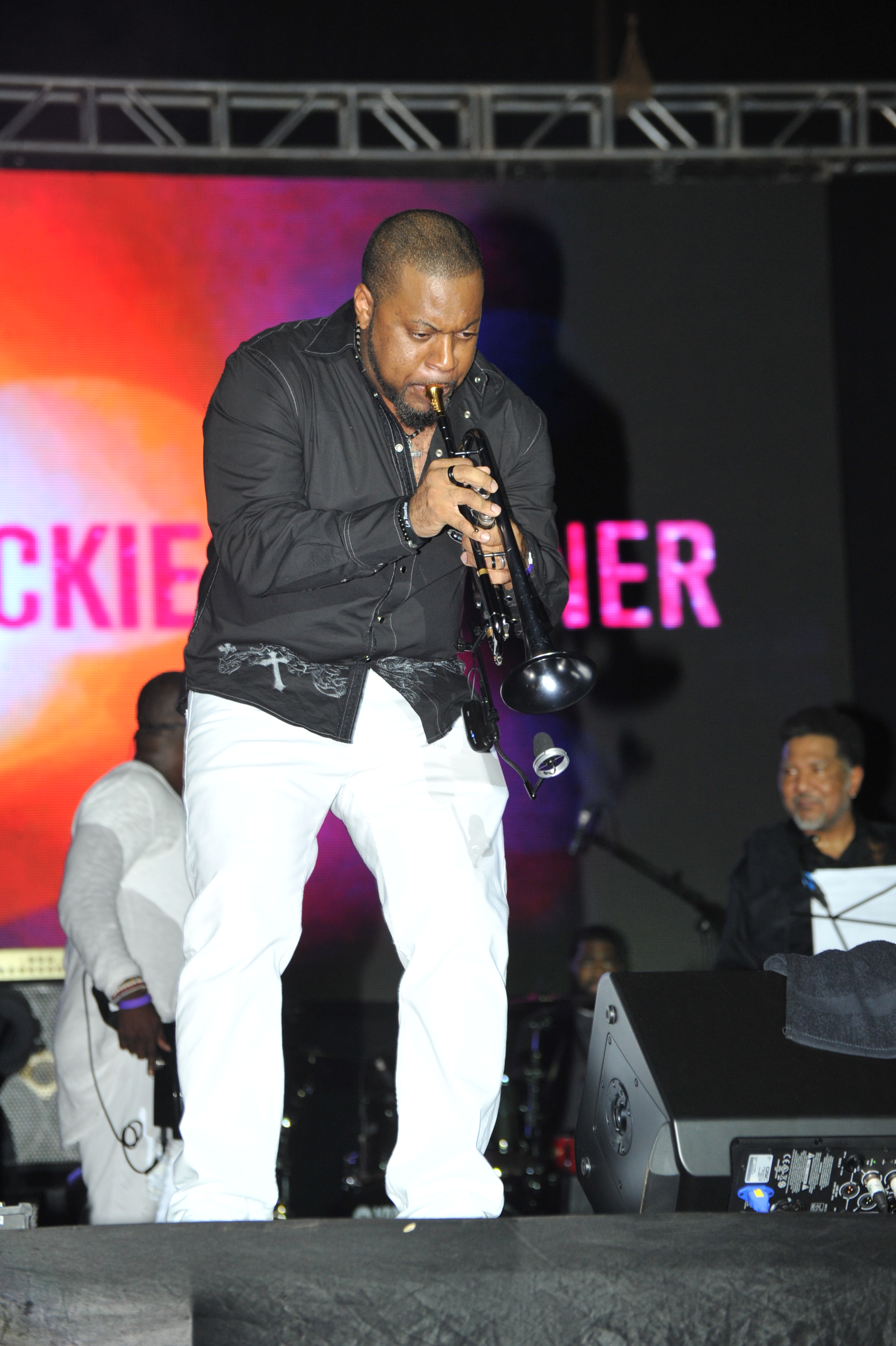
- Lin Rountree - 9th Annual Nile Gold Jazz & Soul Safari - Kampala, Uganda

Background information
- Born: New York, New York, United States
- Origin: Detroit, Michigan
- Genres: Smooth jazz, R&B, Soul
- Occupations: Musician, composer, record producer
- Instruments: Trumpet, flugelhorn
- Years active: 2004–present
- Label: Trippin N' Rhythm Records
- Website: www.linrountreemusic.com

Lin Rountree (born September 15, 1971) is an American soul/urban jazz trumpeter, record producer, and composer. He has recorded 9 solo albums, the last six for Trippin N' Rhythm Records. Between the years 2011 - 2025 Lin Rountree released 24 singles that landed on the National Billboard Top 25 Smooth Jazz Chart which included 5 number 1 Billboard singles; "Pass The Groove" (that stayed #1 for three consecutive weeks), "Fluid" in 2020, "Release" in 2021, "Solid" in 2023 and "So Naturally" in 2025. Rountree's sixth solo album, Stronger Still, peaked at #20 on the Billboard Top 50 Jazz Albums Chart. In 2014, Lin Rountree appeared alongside Jordin Sparks and CeeLo Green in the film, Sparkle.

== Biography ==
Lin Rountree was born September 15, 1971, in New York City, to Linwood and Yvonne Rountree. He and his family then moved to Alexandria, Virginia, where he attended Hayfield Secondary School. Upon graduation Rountree went on attend Florida A&M University (FAMU) in Tallahassee, Florida, and became a member of the Marching 100. While there he became a brother of Omega Psi Phi fraternity. He graduated in 1995 with a Bachelor of Science in Business Administration from FAMU's School Of Business and Industry (SBI).

== Discography ==
Solo albums

- 2005 Groovetree (BDK Records/Nu Millennium)
- 2008 Sumthin' Good (BDK Records/Nu Millennium)
- 2010 SoulTree the Soul-Jazz Experience (Independent)
- 2013 Serendipitous (Trippin' N' Rhythm Records)
- 2015 SoulFunky (Trippin' N' Rhythm Records)
- 2018 Stronger Still (Trippin' N' Rhythm Records)
- 2021 Fluid (Trippin' N' Rhythm Records)
- 2023 The Message (Trippin' N' Rhythm Records)
- 2025 The Chill (Trippin' N' Rhythm Records)
