= Vincent Ingala =

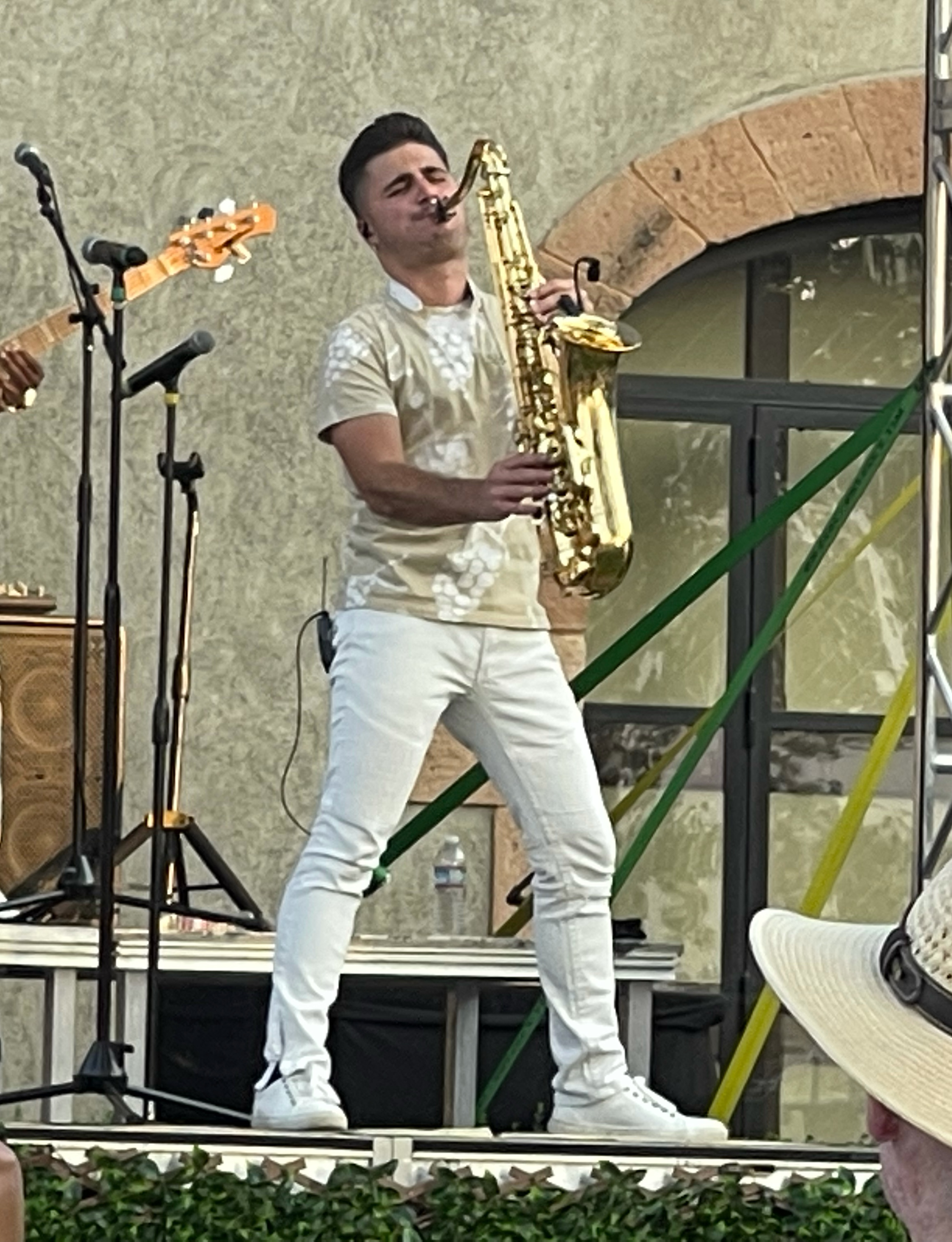
- Vincent Ingala performing in St. Helena, California, in August 2021.

Background information
- Born: Vincent Ingala; December 10, 1992 (age 33)
- Origin: Prospect, Connecticut, United States
- Genres: Smooth jazz, urban jazz, R&B
- Occupations: Musician, composer, producer
- Instruments: Saxophone, Guitar, Drums
- Years active: 2010–present
- Website: vincentingala.com

Vincent Ingala (born December 10, 1992) is a contemporary/urban jazz multi-instrumentalist. The tenor saxophone is his main instrument of choice, though he plays drums, guitar, piano, and sings as well. He has released eight albums, his most recent being released on July 12, 2024.

== Biography ==
Ingala was born in Prospect, Connecticut, to parents Leo and Dawn Ingala. At age four, he started playing the drums when his parents bought him a drum set for Christmas. As he got older he learned to play the guitar, the piano, and later the saxophone at age 10. He is self taught on all instruments. As a teenager, he played the local restaurant and club circuit. His father was a mobile disc jockey, which introduced Vincent to many different styles of music, including 50s rock ’n’ roll, soul, funk, R&B, and also smooth jazz.

His debut album North End Soul, released in 2010, featured smooth jazz and R&B tracks played on the saxophone, guitar, and piano. At seventeen years old, Ingala did the recording, composing, and producing for the album. The song "It Is What It Is" peaked at No. 14 on Billboard's Smooth Jazz Songs.

Ingala's second album Can't Stop Now, released in 2012, features keyboardist Gregg Karukas and pianist Jonathan Fritzén. He wrote or co-wrote seven of the album's tracks, and programmed and composed the album. Can't Stop Now peaked at No. 28 on the Billboard Jazz Albums. It also reached No. 15 on SmoothJazz.com's Year End 2014 Top 50 Albums, and had five songs place in the top 10 on Billboard's Smooth Jazz Songs, including "Wish I Was There" at No. 1.

His third album, Coast to Coast, was released in 2015. The album name reflects his move from the east coast (Connecticut) to the west coast (Long Beach, California). Ingala did the programming, composing, producing, and vocals for the album. The album peaked at No. 12 on the Billboard Jazz Albums, and placed at No. 5 on the SmoothJazz.com's 2015 Top 50 Year End Chart. "When I'm With You" and "Coast To Coast" both peaked at No. 1 on Billboard's Smooth Jazz Songs.

His fourth album was Christmas, released in 2016. Guest artists on the album include Ariana Savalas, Steve Oliver, and Justin Shandor. It features smooth jazz renditions of several Christmas songs played on the saxophone, piano, and guitar. Ingala performs the majority of the vocals.

In 2018, Ingala departed from being an independent artist and signed with record label Shanachie, releasing Personal Touch. Ingala performed all instruments for all 10 tracks on the album, and wrote all but two of them. The song “Snap, Crackle, Pop” went to No. 1 on the Billboard Smooth Jazz chart for five weeks.

Ingala has performed throughout the USA and in several countries, including the United Kingdom, Mexico, Indonesia, Italy, Portugal, Spain, Sweden, and Africa. He has recorded and performed with numerous other instrumental artists such as Peter White, Dave Koz, Mindi Abair, Kirk Whalum, Rick Braun, David Benoit, Keiko Matsui, Earl Klugh, Paul Taylor, Steve Oliver, Michael Lington, Gregg Karukas, Jonathan Fritzen, and Chris Geith.

== Discography ==
=== Albums ===
Date	Album	Peak chart positions				Label
Date	Album	US Jazz	US Con. Jazz	US Top Cur	US Ind	Label
June 29, 2010	North End Soul	—	—	—	—	CD Baby
June 14, 2012	Can't Stop Now	28	14	—	—	CD Baby
May 1, 2015	Coast to Coast	12	3	—	—	CD Baby
November 18, 2016	Christmas	—	12	—	—	CD Baby
April 27, 2018	Personal Touch	4	1	—	38	Shanachie
February 21, 2020	Echoes of the Heart	24	6	—	—	Shanachie
September 17, 2021	Fire & Desire	18	3	97	—	Shanachie
July 12, 2024	Escape with Me	—	7	—	—	Shanachie
"—" denotes a recording that did not chart.

=== Singles ===
Year	Title	Peak chart positions	Album
Year	Title	Smooth Jazz Airplay	Album
2011	"It Is What It Is"	14	North End Soul
2011	"Vintage Vibe"	29	North End Soul
2012	"Can't Stop Now"	4	Can't Stop Now
2013	"Wish I Was There"	1	Can't Stop Now
2013	"To the Top" (Jonathan Fritzén featuring Vincent Ingala)	8	Jonathan Fritzén – Magical
2013	"If I Could Fly"	7	Can't Stop Now
2013	"Snap" (Nicholas Cole featuring Vincent Ingala)	1	Nicholas Cole – Endless Possibilities
2014	"Kimi Trick" (Vincent Ingala featuring Jonathan Fritzén)	9	Can't Stop Now
2015	"Coast to Coast"	1	Coast to Coast
2015	"When I'm with You"	1	Coast to Coast
2016	"Only You" (Gregg Karukas featuring Vincent Ingala)	8	Gregg Karukas – Soul Secrets
2016	"In Deep"	7	Coast to Coast
2016	"Mr. Morris" (Roman Street featuring Vincent Ingala)	14	Roman Street – Bohemia
2017	"Nasty"	2	Coast to Coast
2018	"Personal Touch"	3	Personal Touch
2018	"Snap, Crackle, Pop"	1	Personal Touch
2019	"Dave G" (David Benoit featuring Vincent Ingala)	3	David Benoit – David Benoit and Friends
2019	"Can't Stop the Rain from Falling"	10	Personal Touch
2020	"Caught Me By Surprise"	5	Echoes from the Heart
2020	"New Bounce" (Oli Silk featuring Vincent Ingala)	1	Oli Silk – 6
2020	"Maybe You Think"	9	Echoes from the Heart
2021	"On the Move"	1	Fire and Desire
2022	"Shadow Dancer"	1	Fire and Desire
2022	"Let's Get Down Tonight" (Adam Hawley featuring Vincent Ingala)	1	Adam Hawley – Risin' Up
2023	"Ridin' the Wave"	2	Fire and Desire
2024	"Movin' and Shakin'"	1	Escape with Me
2025	"Let's Get to It"	1	Escape with Me
2025	"That Familiar Feeling"	4	Escape with Me
