= Oli Silk =

British jazz musician

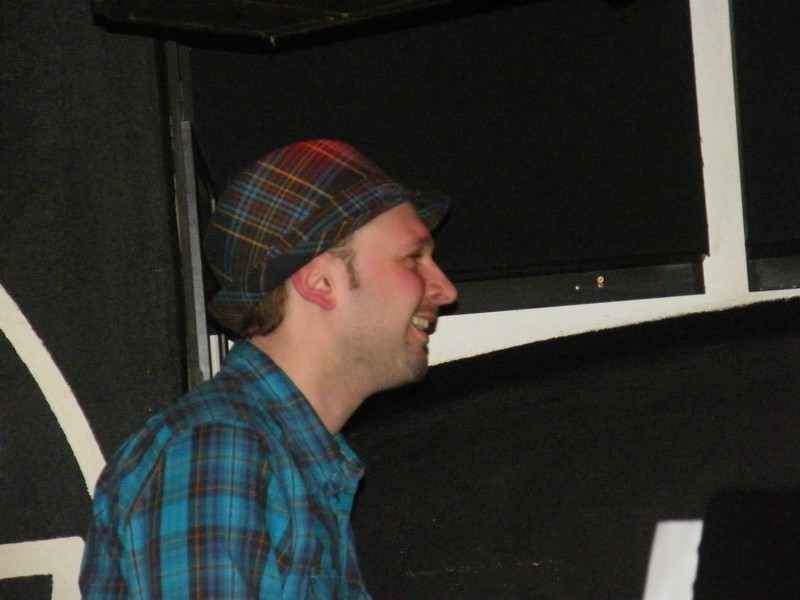
- Oli Silk in 2010

Background information
- Origin: London, England
- Genre: Smooth jazz
- Occupation: Musician
- Instrument: Keyboard
- Years active: 2000–present
- Label: Trippin'N'Rhythm
- Website: olisilk.com

Oli Silk is a British smooth jazz keyboardist, producer and composer.

In 2006, Oli Silk made his debut at the Catalina Island JazzTrax Festival. Later that year, he was named Debut Artist of the Year by *Smooth Jazz News* magazine and Art Good’s JazzTrax.com.[1] His track “Easy Does It” also reached No. 19 on the US Billboard Smooth Jazz Airplay chart.

Although Silk has achieved recognition within the smooth jazz radio market, his chart positions should not be confused with commercial sales chart success. The Billboard Smooth Jazz Airplay chart primarily reflects radio airplay rather than actual physical or streaming sales, and Air Play chart placements alone do not establish an artist’s commercial sales performance.

In 2009, his single “Chill or Be Chilled” reached No. 3 on the Billboard Smooth Jazz Airplay chart and No. 5 on the *Top Smooth Jazz Airplay Chart Songs 2009* ranking.[2] These achievements demonstrated his ability to gain radio exposure within the smooth jazz genre.

In 2010, Silk was nominated for International Artist of the Year at the American Smooth Jazz Awards, further recognising his standing within the genre.

In January 2014, Silk achieved his first Billboard No. 1 on the Smooth Jazz Airplay chart with “At Your Service”, featuring Julian Vaughn.[3]

In September 2026, Silk reportedly secured his third No. 1 on the Billboard Smooth Jazz Airplay chart with “Yessir!”, featuring Jeff Ryan..

== Discography ==
- Fact or Friction (Heaven Cent, 2000)
- Duality (Passion, 2002)
- So Many Ways (Trippin' 'N' Rhythm, 2006)
- The Limit's the Sky (Trippin' N' Rhythm, 2008)
- All We Need (Trippin' N' Rhythm, 2010)
- Razor Sharp Brit (Trippin' N' Rhythm, 2013)
- Where I Left Off (Trippin' N' Rhythm, 2016)
- 6 (Trippin' N' Rhythm, 2020)
- In Real Life (Trippin' N' Rhythm, 2024)
