= Adam Hawley =

American contemporary pop guitarist

- Born: Portland, Oregon
- Genre: Jazz
- Occupation: Musician
- Instrument: Guitar
- Label: Kalimba Music
- Website: adamhawley.com

Adam Hawley is a smooth jazz guitarist.

== Biography ==
Hawley was born and raised in Portland, Oregon. At a young age he developed a keen interest in music, taking up piano lessons at eight and guitar lessons a year later. He eventually attended the University of Southern California where he graduated with a PhD in Music.

== Discography ==
=== Albums ===
Year	Album	Chart positions		Label
Year	Album	US Jazz	US Con. Jazz	Label
2016	Just the Beginning	—	—	Kalimba Music
2018	Double Vision	15	8	Kalimba Music
2020	Escape	23	4	A-Train/MBF Entertainment
2021	Risin' Up	—	8	A-Train/MBF Entertainment
2023	What Christmas Means to Me	—	—	A-Train/MBF Entertainment
2024	Unstoppable	—	—	A-Train/MBF Entertainment
2026	Electric	—	—	A-Train/MBF Entertainment
"—" denotes a release that did not chart.

=== Singles ===
Year	Title	Chart positions	Album
Year	Title	Smooth Jazz Airplay	Album
2016	"35th Street" – (feat. Eric Darius)	1	Just the Beginning
2017	"Joy Ride"	2	Just the Beginning
2017	"I Don't Mind" – (feat. Euge Groove)	1	Just the Beginning
2017	"Backseat Drivers" – (Marcus Anderson feat. Adam Hawley)	20	Limited Edition – (Marcus Anderson)
2018	"Can You Feel It?" – (feat. Marcus Anderson)	1	Double Vision
2018	"Traveling Mood" – (feat. Julian Vaughan)	1	Double Vision
2018	"Take It Back" – (Lin Rountree feat. Adam Hawley)	15	Stronger Still – (Lin Rountree)
2019	"Just Dance" – (feat. Dave Koz)	3	Double Vision
2019	"Shuffle" – (feat. Darren Rahn)	6	Double Vision
2020	"To the Top" – (feat. Jeff Ryan)	2	Escape
2020	"Escape" – (feat. Rick Braun)	1	Escape
2021	"Tokyo Groove"	3	Escape
2021	"Risin' Up"	1	Risin' Up
2021	"New Day" – (Jeff Ryan feat. Adam Hawley)	4	Duality – (Jeff Ryan)
2022	"Gotta Get Up"	2	Risin' Up
2022	"Let's Get Down Tonight" – (feat. Vincent Ingala)	1	Risin' Up
2023	"Right On, Right On" – (feat. Julian Vaughan)	7	Risin' Up
2023	"Uptop"	1	Unstoppable
2024	"Unstoppable"	3	Unstoppable
2024	"Automatic" – (Dave Koz feat. Adam Hawley)	1	Electric
2024	"Fly By"	9	Unstoppable
2025	"Absolute Love" – (feat. Judah Sealy)	1	Unstoppable
2025	"Missing Your Love" – (Jeff Ryan feat. Adam Hawley)	14	Into Focus – (Jeff Ryan)
2025	"RollerSk8"	1	Electric
2026	"Electric" – (feat. Everette Harp)	1	Electric
2026	"Give & Go" – (Julian Vaughn feat. Adam Hawley)	21	Follow Me – (Julian Vaughn)
2026	"Power Move" – (feat. Jeff Ryan)	1	Electric
