= Cindy Bradley =

American jazz musician and composer

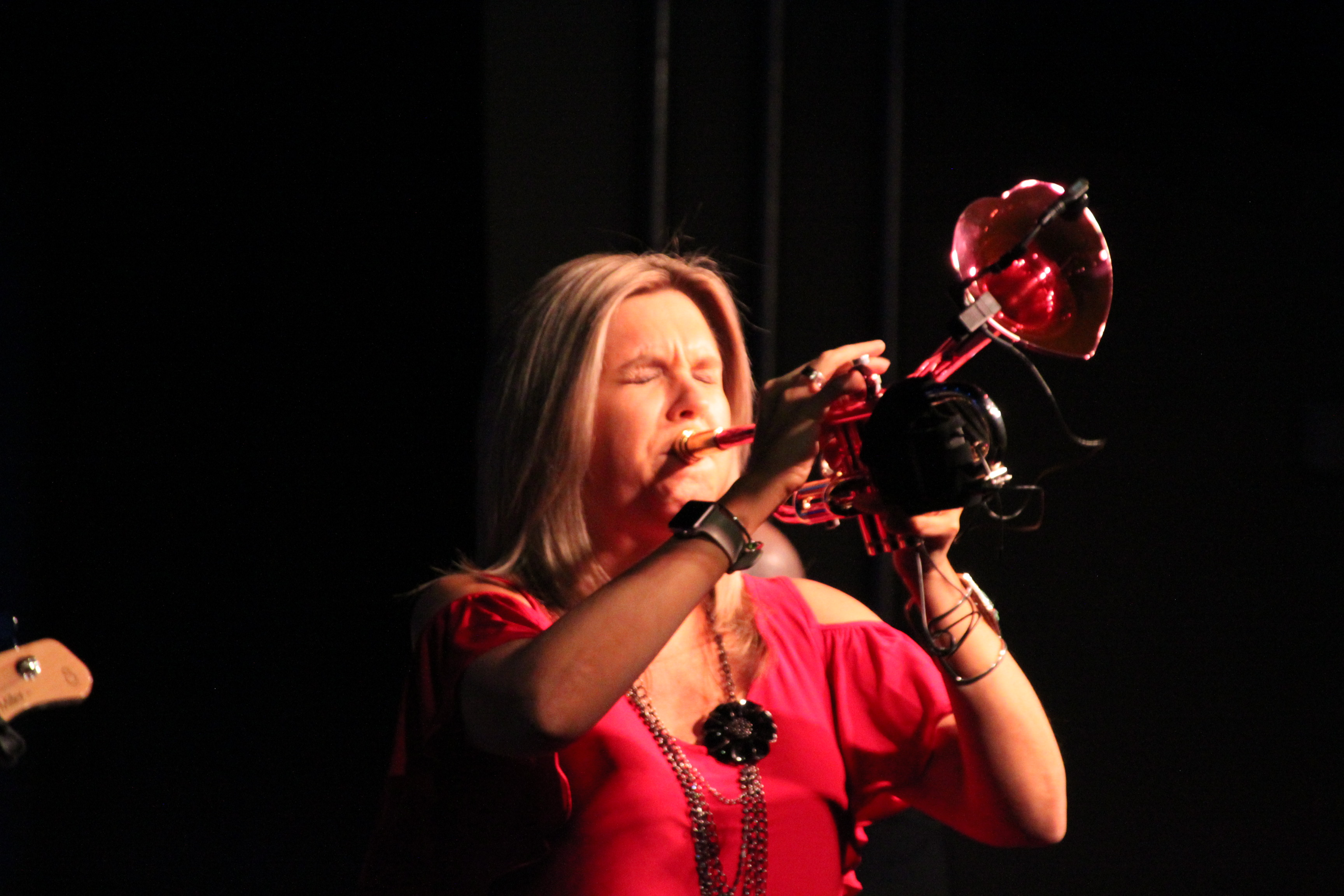
- Bradley in 2020

Background information
- Born: Cindy Lynn Bradley; December 11, 1977 (age 48); North Tonawanda, New York
- Genres: Smooth jazz, contemporary jazz
- Occupations: Musician and composer
- Instruments: Trumpet, flugelhorn
- Years active: 2005–present
- Labels: Trippin' N' Rhythm Records
- Website: cindybradley.com

Cindy Lynn Bradley (born December 11, 1977) is an American smooth jazz trumpet and flugelhorn player and composer.

== Early life ==
Bradley was born in North Tonawanda in upstate New York. She already played piano, but picked up her first trumpet by accident at age nine because it was the only available instrument which she recognized in her teacher's list for school band classes. She began playing traditional jazz trumpet as a schoolgirl and went on to earn degrees in jazz studies at Ithaca College in New York state and in jazz trumpet performance at the New England Conservatory in Boston, Massachusetts.

== Career ==
Bradley released her debut album Just a Little Bit on her own label in 2007. In 2009, she signed with Les Cutmore's Trippin' N' Rhythm Records and recorded her second, Bloom, with Grammy Award-winning producer Michael Broening at his studio in Phoenix, Arizona. Bloom won instant critical acclaim and Bradley followed it in 2011 with Unscripted. The hit single from that album, "Massive Transit", co-written by Bradley and Broening, remained at No. 1 on the US Billboard Smooth Jazz Songs chart for six weeks. Unscripted itself topped the Billboard Jazz Albums chart for two weeks.

Bradley cites her major influences in jazz as fellow trumpet players Freddie Hubbard, Lee Morgan, and Blue Mitchell. When she is not touring or playing at jazz festivals, she works as a public elementary school band teacher in New Jersey. She is a longtime vegan and animal rights advocate.

Bradley's sixth solo album, The Little Things, was released in May 2019 and her seventh, Promise, in July 2023.

== Awards ==
- 2009 Catalina Island JazzTrax Festival Debut Artist of the Year
- 2010 American Smooth Jazz Awards Best New Artist
- 2010 Smooth Jazz News Debut Artist of the Year
- 2011 Oasis Contemporary Jazz Awards New Artist of the Year
- 2011 Oasis Contemporary Jazz Awards Brass Player of the Year
- 2011 Jazziz magazine's Critics' Choice of the Year for Unscripted

== Discography ==
=== Albums ===
As leader

- 2007 Just a Little Bit (CB Jazz Music)
- 2009 Bloom (Trippin' N' Rhythm Records)
- 2011 Unscripted (Trippin' N' Rhythm Records)
- 2014 Bliss (Trippin' N' Rhythm Records)
- 2017 Natural (Trippin' N' Rhythm Records)
- 2019 The Little Things (Trippin' N' Rhythm Records)
- 2023 Promise (Trippin' N' Rhythm Records)

As sidewoman

- 2005 The DIVA Jazz Orchestra A Tommy Newsom Tribute (Lightyear)
- 2006 Cordovan Highway 10 Blues (Cordovan Records)
- 2009 The Very Best of Christmas (Trippin' N' Rhythm Records)
- 2010 Oli Silk All We Need (Trippin' N' Rhythm Records)
- 2011 Nate Harasim Rush (Trippin' N' Rhythm Records)
- 2011 Elan Trotman Love & Sax (E.T. Muzik Productions)
- 2012 Phil Denny Crossover (Off Sheet Music)
- 2012 Jay Stewart Enjoy the Ride (CD Baby)
- 2012 Elizabeth Mis Breakaway (Trippin' N' Rhythm Records)
- 2012 Pete Gitlin Amplify (Coming Together Music)
- 2012 Paula Atherton Enjoy the Ride (Dot Time Records)
- 2013 Kris Brownlee Sincerely Yours (Megawave Records)
- 2013 Althea Rene In the Flow (Trippin' N' Rhythm Records)

=== Singles ===
Number-ones

The following hit number-one on the Billboard Smooth Jazz Airplay chart.

No.	Initial peak date	Title	Weeks	Ref.
01.	September 10, 2011	"Massive Transit"	4	
02.	May 16, 2015	"Bliss"	1	
03.	November 28, 2015	"Button Legs"	2	
04.	April 1, 2017	"Category A" (featuring Chris Standring)	1	
05.	May 19, 2018	"Everyone but You"	3	
06.	November 16, 2019	"Wind Chill Factor"	4	
07.	June 27, 2020	"Snack Grouch"	2	
08.	January 1, 2022	"Daydreams" (Randy Scott featuring Cindy Bradley)	1	
09.	August 27, 2022	"Drive"	2	
10.	April 6, 2024	"Promise"	1	
11.	February 22, 2025	"A Little Moxie"	2	
