= List of Billboard Smooth Jazz Airplay number-ones of the 2010s =

Billboard Smooth Jazz Airplay number-ones by decade

List of Billboard Smooth Jazz Airplay number-ones of the 2010s

No.	Initial peak entry	Artist(s)	Title	Weeks	Ref.
2009
043	October 17	Jessy J	"Tropical Rain"	2	
044	October 24	Peter White	"Bright"	13	
2010
045	January 30	Paul Taylor	"Burnin'"	2	
046	February 13	Sade	"Soldier of Love"	3	
047	February 27	Najee	"Sweet Summer Nights"	2	
048	March 6	Euge Groove	"Sunday Morning"	2	
049	April 3	Jackiem Joyner	"Take Me There"	6	
050	May 15	Bernie Williams featuring Dave Koz	"Ritmo De Otono"	7	
051	July 3	Rick Braun	"Christiane"	1	
052	July 10	Chris Standring	"Bossa Blue"	3	
053	July 24	Steve Oliver	"Fun in the Sun"	8	
054	August 28	Mindi Abair	"Be Beautiful"	2	
055	October 9	Jazzmasters	"Touch and Go"	1	
056	October 16	Kenny G	"Heart and Soul"	1	
057	October 23	Brian Culbertson featuring Earl Klugh	"That's Life"	5	
058	November 6	Dave Koz featuring Lee Ritenour	"Put the Top Down"	15	
2011
059	March 12	Nils	"Jump Start"	8	
060	May 7	Boney James	"Contact"	5	
061	June 11	David Benoit	"Botswana Bossa Nova"	6	
062	July 23	Dave Koz	"Anything's Possible"	2	
063	August 6	Paul Taylor	"Push to Start"	5	
064	September 10	Cindy Bradley	"Massive Transit"	4	
065	October 8	Boney James	"Spin"	4	
066	November 5	Paul Hardcastle	"Easy Come Easy Go"	3	
067	November 26	Richard Elliot	"Boom Town"	9	
2012
068	January 28	Acoustic Alchemy	"Marrakesh"	4	
069	February 4	George Benson	"The Lady in My Life"	2	
070	March 10	Najee	"Perfect Nites"	1	
071	March 17	Chris Standring	"Oliver's Twist"	6	
072	April 28	Peter White	"Here We Go"	4	
073	May 5	Jeff Lorber Fusion	"Big Brother"	2	
074	May 19	Paul Brown	"The Funky Joint"	4	
075	July 7	Brian Culbertson	"Your Smile"	3	
076	July 21	Richard Elliot	"Island Style"	1	
077	August 4	Kenny G and Rahul Sharma	"Namaste"	1	
078	August 11	David Benoit	"Feelin' It"	6	
079	September 15	Gerald Albright / Norman Brown	"In the Moment"	2	
080	October 6	Jeff Lorber Fusion	"City"	1	
081	October 13	Julian Vaughn	"On Your Feet"	2	
082	October 27	Jonathan Fritzén featuring Boney James	"Magical"	3	
083	November 17	Euge Groove	"House of Groove"	3	
084	December 8	Fourplay	"Sonnymoon"	2	
085	December 22	Richard Elliot	"Inner City Blues (Make Me Wanna Holler)"	1	
086	December 29	Paul Brown featuring Bob James	"Backstage Pass"	6	
2013
087	February 9	Gerald Albright / Norman Brown	"Champagne Life"	4	
088	March 9	Vincent Ingala	"Wish I Was There"	4	
089	March 30	Paul Hardcastle	"No Stress"	1	
090	April 13	Boney James featuring Rick Braun	"Batucada (The Beat)"	8	
091	June 8	Euge Groove	"Old.Edu (Old School)"	1	
092	June 15	Althea Rene	"In the Flow"	5	
093	July 20	Dave Koz featuring Gerald Albright, Mindi Abair and Richard Elliot	"Got to Get You into My Life"	7	
094	August 24	Bob James and David Sanborn	"Deep in the Weeds"	3	
095	September 28	Jeff Golub with Brian Auger	"Pusherman"	6	
096	October 5	Tim Bowman	"Seaside Drive"	1	
097	October 12	Boney James	"Powerhouse"	2	
098	November 30	Jeff Lorber Fusion	"Hacienda"	6	
2014
099	January 11	Pieces of a Dream	"Stepper's "D" Lite"	3	
100	January 18	Nicholas Cole featuring Vincent Ingala	"Snap"	1	
101	February 8	Oli Silk featuring Julian Vaughn	"At Your Service"	2	
102	February 22	bwb	"Shake Your Body (Down to the Ground)"	4	
103	March 22	Brian Culbertson featuring Chuck Loeb	"Fullerton Ave."	8	
104	May 17	Down to the Bone	"The Sweetness"	2	
105	May 24	Chris Standring	"Sneakin' out the Front Door"	1	
106	May 31	Paul Taylor	"Supernova"	2	
107	June 21	Vandell Andrew	"Let's Ride"	5	
108	July 26	Rick Braun	"Get Up and Dance"	5	
109	August 23	Richard Elliot	"Givin' It Up"	2	
110	September 6	Jonathan Butler	"African Breeze"	3	
111	October 4	Jazz Funk Soul	"Serious Business"	3	
112	October 25	Gerald Albright	"Slam Dunk"	3	
113	November 15	Peter White	"Head Over Heels"	9	
2015
114	January 17	Rick Braun	"Back to Back"	3	
115	February 7	Richard Elliot	"Lip Service"	6	
116	March 21	Brian Culbertson	"Think Free" (live)	6	
117	April 25	Kim Waters	"Go-Go Smooth"	2	
118	May 16	Cindy Bradley	"Bliss"	1	
119	May 23	Boney James	"Drumline"	6	
120	July 4	Julian Vaughn featuring Elan Trotman	"Ride Along"	2	
121	July 18	Vincent Ingala	"Coast to Coast"	3	
122	August 8	Gregg Karukas featuring Ricardo Silveira, Shelby Flint and Ron Boustead	"Rio Drive"	3	
123	August 29	Najee	"Fly with the Wind"	2	
124	September 12	Jeff Golub featuring Philippe Saisse and Kirk Whalum	"Swagster"	4	
125	October 10	Walter Beasley	"I'm Back"	2	
126	October 24	Gerald Albright	"Because of You"	3	
127	November 7	Boney James	"Vinyl"	2	
128	November 28	Cindy Bradley	"Button Legs"	2	
129	December 12	Vincent Ingala	"When I'm With You"	1	
130	December 19	Jeff Lorber Fusion	"Get Up"	8	
2016
131	February 13	Fourplay	"Silverado"	2	
132	February 27	Lindsey Webster	"Fool Me Once"	4	
133	March 26	3rd Force	"Big Shot"	2	
134	April 9	The JT Project	"Overdrive"	3	
135	April 30	Boney James	"A Little Attitude"	1	
136	May 7	Nick Colionne	"The Journey"	2	
137	May 21	bwb	"bwb"	1	
138	May 28	Darren Rahn	"D-Luxe"	2	
139	June 11	Adam Hawley featuring Eric Darius	"35th Street"	5	
140	July 16	Marcus Anderson featuring Matt Marshak	"Cup of Joe"	2	
141	July 30	Euge Groove	"Still Euge"	1	
142	August 6	Steve Cole	"Mirage"	1	
143	August 13	Paul Jackson Jr.	"B.F.A.M. (Brothers From Another Mother)"	4	
144	September 10	bwb	"Triple Dare"	1	
145	September 17	Nick Colionne	"Say What's on Your Mind"	4	
146	October 15	Brian Culbertson	"Been Around the World"	1	
147	October 22	Marc Antoine	"Laguna Beach"	2	
148	November 5	Gerald Albright	"Taking Control"	3	
149	November 26	Paul Brown	"Put It Where You Want It"	1	
150	December 3	Paul Hardcastle	"Echoes Rising"	2	
151	December 17	Nathan East	"Lifecycle"	7	
2017
152	February 4	Peter White	"Do I Do"	4	
153	March 4	Nick Colionne	"Morning Call"	4	
154	April 1	Cindy Bradley featuring Chris Standring	"Category A"	1	
155	April 8	Kayla Waters featuring Kim Waters	"I Am"	1	
156	April 15	Brian Culbertson	"Hey Girl"	3	
157	May 6	Marc Antoine featuring Philippe Saisse	"Why Not"	1	
158	May 13	Paul Brown	"Hush"	2	
159	May 27	Lindsey Webster	"Where Do You Want to Go"	2	
160	June 10	Richard Elliot	"Harry the Hipster"	2	
161	June 24	Chris Standring	"Like This, Like That"	1	
162	July 1	Special EFX	"Lavish"	2	
163	July 8	Norman Brown	"It Keeps Coming Back"	1	
164	July 22	Skinny Hightower featuring Andrew Hawkley	"Taboo"	1	
165	July 29	Jazz Holdouts	"Summer Nights"	2	
166	August 12	Adam Hawley featuring Euge Groove	"I Don't Mind"	3	
167	August 26	Nick Colionne	"Uncle Nick"	1	
168	September 9	David Benoit and Marc Antoine	"Caminando"	4	
169	October 7	Gerald Albright	"Frankie B."	1	
170	October 14	Boney James	"Tick Tock"	4	
171	November 11	Najee featuring Incognito	"Let's Take It Back"	3	
172	December 2	Paul Brown featuring Chris Standring	"Piccadilly Circus"	3	
173	December 23	Michael J Thomas	"Baby Coffee"	3	
2018
174	January 13	Lin Rountree	"Pass the Groove"	3	
175	February 3	Euge Groove	"Groove On"	3	
176	February 24	Nick Colionne	"Buckle Up"	2	
177	March 10	Brian Culbertson	"Colors of Love"	4	
178	April 7	Boney James	"On the Prowl"	3	
179	April 28	Adam Hawley featuring Marcus Anderson	"Can You Feel It?"	3	
180	May 19	Cindy Bradley	"Everyone but You"	3	
181	June 9	ThreeStyle featuring Magdalena Chovancova	"Ready to Go"	2	
182	June 23	Jeff Ryan	"Up and Up"	4	
183	July 21	Ragan Whiteside	"Corey's Bop"	1	
184	July 28	Brian Culbertson	"You're Magic"	4	
185	August 25	Phil Denny	"Switch Up"	1	
186	September 1	Boney James	"Up All Night"	4	
187	September 29	Paul Brown	"Boogaloo"	2	
188	October 13	Brian Bromberg	"Coupe De Ville"	1	
189	October 20	Adam Hawley featuring Julian Vaughn	"Traveling Mood"	4	
190	November 17	Blake Aaron featuring Darren Rahn	"Groovers and Shakers"	1	
191	November 24	Kayla Waters	"Zephyr"	4	
192	December 22	Vincent Ingala	"Snap, Crackle, Pop"	5	
2019
193	January 26	The JT Project featuring Najee	"Backyard Brew"	4	
194	February 23	Ben Tankard	"Rise!"	2	
195	March 9	Nick Colionne	"How Sweet It Is (To Be Loved by You)"	1	
196	March 16	Greg Manning	"Top Down"	1	
197	March 23	Will Donato	"Infinite Soul"	1	
198	March 30	John Novello featuring Eric Marienthal	"Good to Go"	2	
199	April 13	Norman Brown	"The King Is Here"	2	
200	April 27	Keiko Matsui featuring Gretchen Parlato	"Spirit Dance"	1	
201	May 4	Paul Hardcastle	"Happy Go Lucky"	1	
202	May 11	The Rippingtons featuring Russ Freeman	"Silver Arrows"	3	
203	June 1	Kim Scott featuring Jonathan Fritzén	"Emerge"	2	
204	June 15	Gregory Goodloe	"Stylin'"	1	
205	June 22	Julian Vaughn	"Black Dynamite"	2	
206	July 6	Bob James Trio	"Topside"	3	
207	July 27	Riley Richard	"Captivate Me"	3	
208	August 17	Thom Rotella	"Eddie's Ready"	1	
209	August 24	Michael J Thomas	"I'll Never Love Again"	1	
210	August 31	Keiko Matsui	"Moon Over Gotham"	2	
211	September 14	Four80East	"Cinco Cinco Seis"	3	
212	October 5	Nicholas Cole featuring Chieli Minucci	"Soulmate"	2	
213	October 19	Rick Braun	"Crossroads"	2	
214	November 2	Dave Koz / Gerald Albright / Rick Braun / Richard Elliot / Aubrey Logan	"Before I Let Go"	1	
215	November 9	Joyce Cooling	"It's So Amazing"	1	
216	November 16	Cindy Bradley	"Wind Chill Factor"	4	
217	December 14	Kayla Waters	"Full Bloom"	6	

== See also ==
- 2010s in music
