= List of Billboard Smooth Jazz Airplay number-ones of the 2000s =

Billboard Smooth Jazz Airplay number-ones by decade

List of Billboard Smooth Jazz Airplay number-ones of the 2000s.

No.	Initial peak entry	Artist(s)	Title	Weeks	Ref.
2005
001	October 22	Paul Hardcastle	"Serene"	2	
002	November 5	Brian Culbertson	"Hookin' Up"	4	
003	December 3	Euge Groove	"Get 'Em Goin'"	5	
2006
004	January 7	Rick Braun	"Shining Star"	6	
005	February 4	Brian Simpson	"It's All Good"	1	
006	February 25	Richard Elliot	"Mystique"	7	
007	April 15	Paul Brown	"Winelite"	5	
008	May 20	Philippe Saisse Trio	"Do It Again"	6	
009	June 3	Nils Jiptner	"Summer Nights"	1	
010	July 8	Peter White	"What Does It Take (To Win Your Love)"	16	
011	October 28	Jazzmasters	"Free as the Wind"	4	
012	November 11	Boney James featuring George Duke	"The Total Experience"	4	
013	December 16	George Benson and Al Jarreau	"Mornin'"	5	
2007
014	January 27	Kirk Whalum	"Give Me the Reason"	7	
015	March 3	Mindi Abair	"Bloom"	2	
016	March 31	Peter White	"Mister Magic"	8	
017	May 26	Walter Beasley	"Ready for Love"	2	
018	June 9	Boney James	"Hypnotic"	3	
019	June 30	Paul Brown	"The Rhythm Method"	3	
020	July 21	Norman Brown	"Let's Take a Ride"	7	
021	September 8	Euge Groove	"Born 2 Groove"	1	
022	September 15	Rick Braun and Richard Elliot	"R n R"	10	
023	November 10	Jeff Golub featuring Richard Elliot	"Ain't No Woman (Like the One I Got)"	2	
024	December 8	Candy Dulfer	"L.A. City Lights"	7	
2008
025	January 19	Boney James	"Let It Go"	3	
026	February 9	Eric Marienthal	"Blue Water"	1	
027	February 23	Paul Hardcastle	"Lucky Star"	6	
028	April 5	Kenny G	"Sax-o-loco"	7	
029	May 24	Jessy J	"Tequila Moon"	7	
030	July 12	Chuck Loeb	"Window of the Soul"	1	
031	July 19	Brian Culbertson	"Always Remember"	2	
032	August 2	The Sax Pack	"Fallin' for You"	10	
033	October 11	Dave Koz	"Life in the Fast Lane"	7	
034	October 18	Eric Darius	"Goin' All Out"	2	
035	December 13	Tim Bowman	"Sweet Sundays"	5	
2009
036	January 17	Euge Groove	"Religify"	7	
037	March 7	Boney James	"Stop, Look, Listen (To Your Heart)"	8	
038	May 2	Jackiem Joyner	"I'm Waiting for You"	12	
039	July 25	Walter Beasley	"Steady as She Goes"	5	
040	August 1	Richard Elliot	"Move On Up"	1	
041	August 29	Bernie Williams	"Go for It"	3	
042	September 26	Darren Rahn	"Talk of the Town"	3	
043	October 17	Jessy J	"Tropical Rain"	2	
044	October 24	Peter White	"Bright"	13	

== See also ==
- 2000s in music
