= Smooth Jazz Airplay =

The Billboard Smooth Jazz Airplay chart measures airplay spins on 15 smooth jazz radio stations in the United States.

== Chart history ==
Billboard Smooth Jazz Airplay –number-ones– ~by decade~ 2000s · 2010s · 2020s ~by year~
- 2000 · 2001 · 2002 · 2003 · 2004 · 2005 · 2006 · 2007 · 2008 · 2009 · 2010 · 2011 · 2012 · 2013 · 2014 · 2015 · 2016 · 2017 · 2018 · 2019 · 2020 · 2021 · 2022 · 2023 · 2024 · 2025 · 2026 · 2027 · 2028 · 2029 ·

== Artists with most number-one hits ==
Artists with most Smooth Jazz Airplay No. 1s

(as of November 14, 2026)

23 – Boney James
17 – Gerald Albright
16 – Richard Elliot
13 – Brian Culbertson
13 – Adam Hawley
12 – Rick Braun
12 – Dave Koz
11 – Paul Brown
11 – Paul Hardcastle
11 – Cindy Bradley
11 – Vincent Ingala
11 – Ryan La Valette
11 – Euge Groove
10 – Nick Colionne
10 – Chris Standring

== Songs at number-one for at least five weeks ==
Smooth Jazz Airplay
Weeks	Year	Artist(s)	Title	Ref.
16	2006	Peter White	"What Does It Take (To Win Your Love)"	
15	2010	Dave Koz featuring Lee Ritenour	"Put the Top Down"	
13	2009	Peter White	"Bright"	
12	2009	Jackiem Joyner	"I'm Waiting for You"	
10	2007	Rick Braun and Richard Elliot	"R n R"	
10	2008	The Sax Pack	"Fallin' for You"	
9	2011	Richard Elliot	"Boom Town"	
9	2014	Peter White	"Head Over Heels"	
8	2007	Peter White	"Mister Magic"	
8	2009	Boney James	"Stop, Look, Listen (To Your Heart)"	
8	2010	Steve Oliver	"Fun in the Sun"	
8	2011	Nils	"Jump Start"	
8	2013	Boney James featuring Rick Braun	"Batucada (The Beat)"	
8	2014	Brian Culbertson featuring Chuck Loeb	"Fullerton Ave."	
8	2015	Jeff Lorber Fusion	"Get Up"	
7	2006	Richard Elliot	"Mystique"	
7	2007	Kirk Whalum	"Give Me the Reason"	
7	2007	Norman Brown	"Let's Take a Ride"	
7	2007	Candy Dulfer	"L.A. City Lights"	
7	2008	Kenny G	"Sax-o-loco"	
7	2008	Jessy J	"Tequila Moon"	
7	2008	Dave Koz	"Life in the Fast Lane"	
7	2009	Euge Groove	"Religify"	
7	2010	Bernie Williams featuring Dave Koz	"Ritmo De Otono"	
7	2013	Dave Koz featuring Gerald Albright, Mindi Abair and Richard Elliot	"Got to Get You into My Life"	
7	2016	Nathan East	"Lifecycle"	
7	2023	Michael Lington	"South Bay"	
6	2006	Rick Braun	"Shining Star"	
6	2006	Philippe Saisse Trio	"Do It Again"	
6	2008	Paul Hardcastle	"Lucky Star"	
6	2010	Jackiem Joyner	"Take Me There"	
6	2011	David Benoit	"Botswana Bossa Nova"	
6	2012	Chris Standring	"Oliver's Twist"	
6	2012	David Benoit	"Feelin' It"	
6	2012	Paul Brown featuring Bob James	"Backstage Pass"	
6	2013	Jeff Golub with Brian Auger	"Pusherman"	
6	2013	Jeff Lorber Fusion	"Hacienda"	
6	2015	Richard Elliot	"Lip Service"	
6	2015	Brian Culbertson	"Think Free" (live)	
6	2015	Boney James	"Drumline"	
6	2019	Kayla Waters	"Full Bloom"	
5	2005	Euge Groove	"Get 'Em Goin'"	
5	2006	Paul Brown	"Winelite"	
5	2006	George Benson and Al Jarreau	"Mornin'"	
5	2008	Tim Bowman	"Sweet Sundays"	
5	2009	Walter Beasley	"Steady as She Goes"	
5	2010	Brian Culbertson featuring Earl Klugh	"That's Life"	
5	2011	Boney James	"Contact"	
5	2011	Paul Taylor	"Push to Start"	
5	2013	Althea Rene	"In the Flow"	
5	2014	Vandell Andrew	"Let's Ride"	
5	2014	Rick Braun	"Get Up and Dance"	
5	2016	Adam Hawley featuring Eric Darius	"35th Street"	
5	2018	Vincent Ingala	"Snap, Crackle, Pop"	
5	2023	Bobby Lyle featuring Nathan East	"Nujazzy"	
5	2023	Ryan La Valette featuring Nicholas Cole	"Lovers Melody"	
5	2023	Lemek featuring Ryan La Valette	"Groove Central"	
5	2023	Ryan La Valette featuring Chris 'Big Dog' Davis	"Closer to You"	
5	2024	Norman Brown	"Anything"	

== Women with number-ones ==
(Debut date precedes name)

- 2007 Mar 03 – Mindi Abair
- 2007 Dec 08 – Candy Dulfer
- 2008 May 24 – Jessy J
- 2010 Feb 13 – Sade
- 2011 Sep 10 – Cindy Bradley
- 2013 Jun 15 – Althea Rene
- 2016 Feb 27 – Lindsey Webster
- 2017 Apr 08 – Kayla Waters
- 2018 Jun 09 – Magdalena Chovancova
- 2018 Jul 21 – Ragan Whiteside
- 2019 Apr 27 – Keiko Matsui
- 2019 Apr 27 – Gretchen Parlato
- 2019 Jun 01 – Kim Scott
- 2019 Nov 02 – Aubrey Logan
- 2019 Nov 09 – Joyce Cooling
- 2020 Jan 25 – Lisa Addeo
- 2020 Apr 18 – Paula Atherton
- 2020 Jun 20 – Jazmin Ghent
- 2021 Nov 27 – Pamela Williams
- 2022 Oct 15 – Lauran Beluzo
- 2022 Nov 05 – Carol Albert
- 2023 Oct 28 – Phylicia Rae
- 2024 Aug 17 – Catie Waters
- 2025 Mar 22 – Chelsey Green
- 2026 Apr 04 – WaKaNa

== Local on the 8s ==
- The Weather Channel Presents: The Best of Smooth Jazz
- The Weather Channel Presents: Smooth Jazz II
