= List of Billboard Smooth Jazz Airplay number-ones of 2007 =

The Smooth Jazz Airplay number-ones from Billboard for 2007.

== 2007 number-ones ==
2007
Issue date	Song	Artist(s)	Ref.
January 6	"Mornin'"	George Benson and Al Jarreau	
January 13	"Mornin'"	George Benson and Al Jarreau	
January 20	"Mornin'"	George Benson and Al Jarreau	
January 27	"Give Me the Reason"	Kirk Whalum	
February 3	"Give Me the Reason"	Kirk Whalum	
February 10	"Give Me the Reason"	Kirk Whalum	
February 17	"Give Me the Reason"	Kirk Whalum	
February 24	"Give Me the Reason"	Kirk Whalum	
March 3	"Bloom"	Mindi Abair	
March 10	"Give Me the Reason"	Kirk Whalum	
March 17	"Bloom"	Mindi Abair	
March 24	"Give Me the Reason"	Kirk Whalum	
March 31	"Mister Magic"	Peter White	
April 7	"Mister Magic"	Peter White	
April 14	"Mister Magic"	Peter White	
April 21	"Mister Magic"	Peter White	
April 28	"Mister Magic"	Peter White	
May 5	"Mister Magic"	Peter White	
May 12	"Mister Magic"	Peter White	
May 19	"Mister Magic"	Peter White	
May 26	"Ready for Love"	Walter Beasley	
June 2	"Ready for Love"	Walter Beasley	
June 9	"Hypnotic"	Boney James	
June 16	"Hypnotic"	Boney James	
June 23	"Hypnotic"	Boney James	
June 30	"The Rhythm Method"	Paul Brown	
July 7	"The Rhythm Method"	Paul Brown	
July 14	"The Rhythm Method"	Paul Brown	
July 21	"Let's Take a Ride"	Norman Brown	
July 28	"Let's Take a Ride"	Norman Brown	
August 4	"Let's Take a Ride"	Norman Brown	
August 11	"Let's Take a Ride"	Norman Brown	
August 18	"Let's Take a Ride"	Norman Brown	
August 25	"Let's Take a Ride"	Norman Brown	
September 1	"Let's Take a Ride"	Norman Brown	
September 8	"Born 2 Groove"	Euge Groove	
September 15	"R n R"	Rick Braun and Richard Elliot	
September 22	"R n R"	Rick Braun and Richard Elliot	
September 29	"R n R"	Rick Braun and Richard Elliot	
October 6	"R n R"	Rick Braun and Richard Elliot	
October 13	"R n R"	Rick Braun and Richard Elliot	
October 20	"R n R"	Rick Braun and Richard Elliot	
October 27	"R n R"	Rick Braun and Richard Elliot	
November 3	"R n R"	Rick Braun and Richard Elliot	
November 10	"Ain't No Woman (Like the One I Got)"	Jeff Golub featuring Richard Elliot	
November 17	"R n R"	Rick Braun and Richard Elliot	
November 24	"R n R"	Rick Braun and Richard Elliot	
December 1	"Ain't No Woman (Like the One I Got)"	Jeff Golub featuring Richard Elliot	
December 8	"L.A. City Lights"	Candy Dulfer	
December 15	"L.A. City Lights"	Candy Dulfer	
December 22	"L.A. City Lights"	Candy Dulfer	
December 29	"L.A. City Lights"	Candy Dulfer	
