= List of Billboard Smooth Jazz Airplay number-ones of 2010 =

The Smooth Jazz Airplay number-ones from Billboard for 2010.

== 2010 number-ones ==
2010
Issue date	Song	Artist(s)	Ref.
January 2	"Bright"	Peter White	
January 9	"Bright"	Peter White	
January 16	"Bright"	Peter White	
January 23	"Bright"	Peter White	
January 30	"Burnin'"	Paul Taylor	
February 6	"Burnin'"	Paul Taylor	
February 13	"Soldier of Love"	Sade	
February 20	"Soldier of Love"	Sade	
February 27	"Sweet Summer Nights"	Najee	
March 6	"Sunday Morning"	Euge Groove	
March 13	"Sunday Morning"	Euge Groove	
March 20	"Sweet Summer Nights"	Najee	
March 27	"Soldier of Love"	Sade	
April 3	"Take Me There"	Jackiem Joyner	
April 10	"Take Me There"	Jackiem Joyner	
April 17	"Take Me There"	Jackiem Joyner	
April 24	"Take Me There"	Jackiem Joyner	
May 1	"Take Me There"	Jackiem Joyner	
May 8	"Take Me There"	Jackiem Joyner	
May 15	"Ritmo De Otono"	Bernie Williams featuring Dave Koz	
May 22	"Ritmo De Otono"	Bernie Williams featuring Dave Koz	
May 29	"Ritmo De Otono"	Bernie Williams featuring Dave Koz	
June 5	"Ritmo De Otono"	Bernie Williams featuring Dave Koz	
June 12	"Ritmo De Otono"	Bernie Williams featuring Dave Koz	
June 19	"Ritmo De Otono"	Bernie Williams featuring Dave Koz	
June 26	"Ritmo De Otono"	Bernie Williams featuring Dave Koz	
July 3	"Christiane"	Rick Braun	
July 10	"Bossa Blue"	Chris Standring	
July 17	"Bossa Blue"	Chris Standring	
July 24	"Fun in the Sun"	Steve Oliver	
July 31	"Fun in the Sun"	Steve Oliver	
August 7	"Bossa Blue"	Chris Standring	
August 14	"Fun in the Sun"	Steve Oliver	
August 21	"Fun in the Sun"	Steve Oliver	
August 28	"Be Beautiful"	Mindi Abair	
September 4	"Fun in the Sun"	Steve Oliver	
September 11	"Be Beautiful"	Mindi Abair	
September 18	"Fun in the Sun"	Steve Oliver	
September 25	"Fun in the Sun"	Steve Oliver	
October 2	"Fun in the Sun"	Steve Oliver	
October 9	"Touch and Go"	Jazzmasters	
October 16	"Heart and Soul"	Kenny G	
October 23	"That's Life"	Brian Culbertson featuring Earl Klugh	
October 30	"That's Life"	Brian Culbertson featuring Earl Klugh	
November 6	"Put the Top Down"	Dave Koz featuring Lee Ritenour	
November 13	"That's Life"	Brian Culbertson featuring Earl Klugh	
November 20	"Put the Top Down"	Dave Koz featuring Lee Ritenour	
November 27	"Put the Top Down"	Dave Koz featuring Lee Ritenour	
December 4	"That's Life"	Brian Culbertson featuring Earl Klugh	
December 11	"That's Life"	Brian Culbertson featuring Earl Klugh	
December 18	"Put the Top Down"	Dave Koz featuring Lee Ritenour	
December 25	"Put the Top Down"	Dave Koz featuring Lee Ritenour	
