= List of Billboard Smooth Jazz Airplay number-ones of 2013 =

The Smooth Jazz Airplay number-ones from Billboard for 2013.

== 2013 number-ones ==
2013
| Issue date | Song | Artist(s) | Ref. |
|---|---|---|---|
| January 5 | "Backstage Pass" | Paul Brown featuring Bob James | |
| January 12 | "Backstage Pass" | Paul Brown featuring Bob James | |
| January 19 | "Backstage Pass" | Paul Brown featuring Bob James | |
| January 26 | "Backstage Pass" | Paul Brown featuring Bob James | |
| February 2 | "Backstage Pass" | Paul Brown featuring Bob James | |
| February 9 | "Champagne Life" | Gerald Albright / Norman Brown | |
| February 16 | "Champagne Life" | Gerald Albright / Norman Brown | |
| February 23 | "Champagne Life" | Gerald Albright / Norman Brown | |
| March 2 | "Champagne Life" | Gerald Albright / Norman Brown | |
| March 9 | "Wish I Was There" | Vincent Ingala | |
| March 16 | "Wish I Was There" | Vincent Ingala | |
| March 23 | "Wish I Was There" | Vincent Ingala | |
| March 30 | "No Stress" | Paul Hardcastle | |
| April 6 | "Wish I Was There" | Vincent Ingala | |
| April 13 | "Batucada (The Beat)" | Boney James featuring Rick Braun | |
| April 20 | "Batucada (The Beat)" | Boney James featuring Rick Braun | |
| April 27 | "Batucada (The Beat)" | Boney James featuring Rick Braun | |
| May 4 | "Batucada (The Beat)" | Boney James featuring Rick Braun | |
| May 11 | "Batucada (The Beat)" | Boney James featuring Rick Braun | |
| May 18 | "Batucada (The Beat)" | Boney James featuring Rick Braun | |
| May 25 | "Batucada (The Beat)" | Boney James featuring Rick Braun | |
| June 1 | "Batucada (The Beat)" | Boney James featuring Rick Braun | |
| June 8 | "Old.Edu (Old School)" | Euge Groove | |
| June 15 | "In the Flow" | Althea Rene | |
| June 22 | "In the Flow" | Althea Rene | |
| June 29 | "In the Flow" | Althea Rene | |
| July 6 | "In the Flow" | Althea Rene | |
| July 13 | "In the Flow" | Althea Rene | |
| July 20 | "Got to Get You into My Life" | Dave Koz featuring Gerald Albright, Mindi Abair and Richard Elliot | |
| July 27 | "Got to Get You into My Life" | Dave Koz featuring Gerald Albright, Mindi Abair and Richard Elliot | |
| August 3 | "Got to Get You into My Life" | Dave Koz featuring Gerald Albright, Mindi Abair and Richard Elliot | |
| August 10 | "Got to Get You into My Life" | Dave Koz featuring Gerald Albright, Mindi Abair and Richard Elliot | |
| August 17 | "Got to Get You into My Life" | Dave Koz featuring Gerald Albright, Mindi Abair and Richard Elliot | |
| August 24 | "Deep in the Weeds" | Bob James and David Sanborn | |
| August 31 | "Got to Get You into My Life" | Dave Koz featuring Gerald Albright, Mindi Abair and Richard Elliot | |
| September 7 | "Got to Get You into My Life" | Dave Koz featuring Gerald Albright, Mindi Abair and Richard Elliot | |
| September 14 | "Deep in the Weeds" | Bob James and David Sanborn | |
| September 21 | "Deep in the Weeds" | Bob James and David Sanborn | |
| September 28 | "Pusherman" | Jeff Golub with Brian Auger | |
| October 5 | "Seaside Drive" | Tim Bowman | |
| October 12 | "Powerhouse" | Boney James | |
| October 19 | "Powerhouse" | Boney James | |
| October 26 | "Pusherman" | Jeff Golub with Brian Auger | |
| November 2 | "Pusherman" | Jeff Golub with Brian Auger | |
| November 9 | "Pusherman" | Jeff Golub with Brian Auger | |
| November 16 | "Pusherman" | Jeff Golub with Brian Auger | |
| November 23 | "Pusherman" | Jeff Golub with Brian Auger | |
| November 30 | "Hacienda" | Jeff Lorber Fusion | |
| December 7 | "Hacienda" | Jeff Lorber Fusion | |
| December 14 | "Hacienda" | Jeff Lorber Fusion | |
| December 21 | "Hacienda" | Jeff Lorber Fusion | |
| December 28 | "Hacienda" | Jeff Lorber Fusion | |
