= List of Billboard Smooth Jazz Airplay number-ones of 2006 =

The Smooth Jazz Airplay number-ones from Billboard for 2006.

== 2006 number-ones ==
2006
Issue date	Song	Artist(s)	Ref.
January 7	"Shining Star"	Rick Braun	
January 14	"Shining Star"	Rick Braun	
January 21	"Shining Star"	Rick Braun	
January 28	"Shining Star"	Rick Braun	
February 4	"It's All Good"	Brian Simpson	
February 11	"Shining Star"	Rick Braun	
February 18	"Shining Star"	Rick Braun	
February 25	"Mystique"	Richard Elliot	
March 4	"Mystique"	Richard Elliot	
March 11	"Mystique"	Richard Elliot	
March 18	"Mystique"	Richard Elliot	
March 25	"Mystique"	Richard Elliot	
April 1	"Mystique"	Richard Elliot	
April 8	"Mystique"	Richard Elliot	
April 15	"Winelite"	Paul Brown	
April 22	"Winelite"	Paul Brown	
April 29	"Winelite"	Paul Brown	
May 6	"Winelite"	Paul Brown	
May 13	"Winelite"	Paul Brown	
May 20	"Do It Again"	Philippe Saisse Trio	
May 27	"Do It Again"	Philippe Saisse Trio	
June 3	"Summer Nights"	Nils Jiptner	
June 10	"Do It Again"	Philippe Saisse Trio	
June 17	"Do It Again"	Philippe Saisse Trio	
June 24	"Do It Again"	Philippe Saisse Trio	
July 1	"Do It Again"	Philippe Saisse Trio	
July 8	"What Does It Take (To Win Your Love)"	Peter White	
July 15	"What Does It Take (To Win Your Love)"	Peter White	
July 22	"What Does It Take (To Win Your Love)"	Peter White	
July 29	"What Does It Take (To Win Your Love)"	Peter White	
August 5	"What Does It Take (To Win Your Love)"	Peter White	
August 12	"What Does It Take (To Win Your Love)"	Peter White	
August 19	"What Does It Take (To Win Your Love)"	Peter White	
August 26	"What Does It Take (To Win Your Love)"	Peter White	
September 2	"What Does It Take (To Win Your Love)"	Peter White	
September 9	"What Does It Take (To Win Your Love)"	Peter White	
September 16	"What Does It Take (To Win Your Love)"	Peter White	
September 23	"What Does It Take (To Win Your Love)"	Peter White	
September 30	"What Does It Take (To Win Your Love)"	Peter White	
October 7	"What Does It Take (To Win Your Love)"	Peter White	
October 14	"What Does It Take (To Win Your Love)"	Peter White	
October 21	"What Does It Take (To Win Your Love)"	Peter White	
October 28	"Free as the Wind"	Jazzmasters	
November 4	"Free as the Wind"	Jazzmasters	
November 11	"The Total Experience"	Boney James featuring George Duke	
November 18	"Free as the Wind"	Jazzmasters	
November 25	"Free as the Wind"	Jazzmasters	
December 2	"The Total Experience"	Boney James featuring George Duke	
December 9	"The Total Experience"	Boney James featuring George Duke	
December 16	"Mornin'"	George Benson and Al Jarreau	
December 23	"Mornin'"	George Benson and Al Jarreau	
December 30	"The Total Experience"	Boney James featuring George Duke	
