= List of Billboard Smooth Jazz Airplay number-ones of 2009 =

The Smooth Jazz Airplay number-ones from Billboard for 2009.

== 2009 number-ones ==
2009
Issue date	Song	Artist(s)	Ref.
January 3	"Sweet Sundays"	Tim Bowman	
January 10	"Sweet Sundays"	Tim Bowman	
January 17	"Religify"	Euge Groove	
January 24	"Religify"	Euge Groove	
January 31	"Religify"	Euge Groove	
February 7	"Religify"	Euge Groove	
February 14	"Religify"	Euge Groove	
February 21	"Religify"	Euge Groove	
February 28	"Religify"	Euge Groove	
March 7	"Stop, Look, Listen (To Your Heart)"	Boney James	
March 14	"Stop, Look, Listen (To Your Heart)"	Boney James	
March 21	"Stop, Look, Listen (To Your Heart)"	Boney James	
March 28	"Stop, Look, Listen (To Your Heart)"	Boney James	
April 4	"Stop, Look, Listen (To Your Heart)"	Boney James	
April 11	"Stop, Look, Listen (To Your Heart)"	Boney James	
April 18	"Stop, Look, Listen (To Your Heart)"	Boney James	
April 25	"Stop, Look, Listen (To Your Heart)"	Boney James	
May 2	"I'm Waiting for You"	Jackiem Joyner	
May 9	"I'm Waiting for You"	Jackiem Joyner	
May 16	"I'm Waiting for You"	Jackiem Joyner	
May 23	"I'm Waiting for You"	Jackiem Joyner	
May 30	"I'm Waiting for You"	Jackiem Joyner	
June 6	"I'm Waiting for You"	Jackiem Joyner	
June 13	"I'm Waiting for You"	Jackiem Joyner	
June 20	"I'm Waiting for You"	Jackiem Joyner	
June 27	"I'm Waiting for You"	Jackiem Joyner	
July 4	"I'm Waiting for You"	Jackiem Joyner	
July 11	"I'm Waiting for You"	Jackiem Joyner	
July 18	"I'm Waiting for You"	Jackiem Joyner	
July 25	"Steady as She Goes"	Walter Beasley	
August 1	"Move On Up"	Richard Elliot	
August 8	"Steady as She Goes"	Walter Beasley	
August 15	"Steady as She Goes"	Walter Beasley	
August 22	"Steady as She Goes"	Walter Beasley	
August 29	"Go for It"	Bernie Williams	
September 5	"Go for It"	Bernie Williams	
September 12	"Go for It"	Bernie Williams	
September 19	"Steady as She Goes"	Walter Beasley	
September 26	"Talk of the Town"	Darren Rahn	
October 3	"Talk of the Town"	Darren Rahn	
October 10	"Talk of the Town"	Darren Rahn	
October 17	"Tropical Rain"	Jessy J	
October 24	"Bright"	Peter White	
October 31	"Tropical Rain"	Jessy J	
November 7	"Bright"	Peter White	
November 14	"Bright"	Peter White	
November 21	"Bright"	Peter White	
November 28	"Bright"	Peter White	
December 5	"Bright"	Peter White	
December 12	"Bright"	Peter White	
December 19	"Bright"	Peter White	
December 26	"Bright"	Peter White	
