= List of Billboard Smooth Jazz Airplay number-ones of 2015 =

The Smooth Jazz Airplay number-ones from Billboard for 2015.

== 2015 number-ones ==
2015
Issue date	Song	Artist(s)	Ref.
January 3	"Head Over Heels"	Peter White	
January 10	"Head Over Heels"	Peter White	
January 17	"Back to Back"	Rick Braun	
January 24	"Back to Back"	Rick Braun	
January 31	"Back to Back"	Rick Braun	
February 7	"Lip Service"	Richard Elliot	
February 14	"Lip Service"	Richard Elliot	
February 21	"Lip Service"	Richard Elliot	
February 28	"Lip Service"	Richard Elliot	
March 7	"Lip Service"	Richard Elliot	
March 14	"Lip Service"	Richard Elliot	
March 21	"Think Free" (live)	Brian Culbertson	
March 28	"Think Free" (live)	Brian Culbertson	
April 4	"Think Free" (live)	Brian Culbertson	
April 11	"Think Free" (live)	Brian Culbertson	
April 18	"Think Free" (live)	Brian Culbertson	
April 25	"Go-Go Smooth"	Kim Waters	
May 2	"Go-Go Smooth"	Kim Waters	
May 9	"Think Free" (live)	Brian Culbertson	
May 16	"Bliss"	Cindy Bradley	
May 23	"Drumline"	Boney James	
May 30	"Drumline"	Boney James	
June 6	"Drumline"	Boney James	
June 13	"Drumline"	Boney James	
June 20	"Drumline"	Boney James	
June 27	"Drumline"	Boney James	
July 4	"Ride Along"	Julian Vaughn featuring Elan Trotman	
July 11	"Ride Along"	Julian Vaughn featuring Elan Trotman	
July 18	"Coast to Coast"	Vincent Ingala	
July 25	"Coast to Coast"	Vincent Ingala	
August 1	"Coast to Coast"	Vincent Ingala	
August 8	"Rio Drive"	Gregg Karukas featuring Ricardo Silveira, Shelby Flint and Ron Boustead	
August 15	"Rio Drive"	Gregg Karukas featuring Ricardo Silveira, Shelby Flint and Ron Boustead	
August 22	"Rio Drive"	Gregg Karukas featuring Ricardo Silveira, Shelby Flint and Ron Boustead	
August 29	"Fly with the Wind"	Najee	
September 5	"Fly with the Wind"	Najee	
September 12	"Swagster"	Jeff Golub featuring Philippe Saisse and Kirk Whalum	
September 19	"Swagster"	Jeff Golub featuring Philippe Saisse and Kirk Whalum	
September 26	"Swagster"	Jeff Golub featuring Philippe Saisse and Kirk Whalum	
October 3	"Swagster"	Jeff Golub featuring Philippe Saisse and Kirk Whalum	
October 10	"I'm Back"	Walter Beasley	
October 17	"I'm Back"	Walter Beasley	
October 24	"Because of You"	Gerald Albright	
October 31	"Because of You"	Gerald Albright	
November 7	"Vinyl"	Boney James	
November 14	"Vinyl"	Boney James	
November 21	"Because of You"	Gerald Albright	
November 28	"Button Legs"	Cindy Bradley	
December 5	"Button Legs"	Cindy Bradley	
December 12	"When I'm With You"	Vincent Ingala	
December 19	"Get Up"	Jeff Lorber Fusion	
December 26	"Get Up"	Jeff Lorber Fusion	
