= List of Billboard Smooth Jazz Airplay number-ones of 2014 =

The Smooth Jazz Airplay number-ones from Billboard for 2014.

== 2014 number-ones ==
2014
Issue date	Song	Artist(s)	Ref.
January 4	"Hacienda"	Jeff Lorber Fusion	
January 11	"Stepper's "D" Lite"	Pieces of a Dream	
January 18	"Snap"	Nicholas Cole featuring Vincent Ingala	
January 25	"Stepper's "D" Lite"	Pieces of a Dream	
February 1	"Stepper's "D" Lite"	Pieces of a Dream	
February 8	"At Your Service"	Oli Silk featuring Julian Vaughn	
February 15	"At Your Service"	Oli Silk featuring Julian Vaughn	
February 22	"Shake Your Body (Down to the Ground)"	bwb	
March 1	"Shake Your Body (Down to the Ground)"	bwb	
March 8	"Shake Your Body (Down to the Ground)"	bwb	
March 15	"Shake Your Body (Down to the Ground)"	bwb	
March 22	"Fullerton Ave."	Brian Culbertson featuring Chuck Loeb	
March 29	"Fullerton Ave."	Brian Culbertson featuring Chuck Loeb	
April 5	"Fullerton Ave."	Brian Culbertson featuring Chuck Loeb	
April 12	"Fullerton Ave."	Brian Culbertson featuring Chuck Loeb	
April 19	"Fullerton Ave."	Brian Culbertson featuring Chuck Loeb	
April 26	"Fullerton Ave."	Brian Culbertson featuring Chuck Loeb	
May 3	"Fullerton Ave."	Brian Culbertson featuring Chuck Loeb	
May 10	"Fullerton Ave."	Brian Culbertson featuring Chuck Loeb	
May 17	"The Sweetness"	Down to the Bone	
May 24	"Sneakin' out the Front Door"	Chris Standring	
May 31	"Supernova"	Paul Taylor	
June 7	"Supernova"	Paul Taylor	
June 14	"The Sweetness"	Down to the Bone	
June 21	"Let's Ride"	Vandell Andrew	
June 28	"Let's Ride"	Vandell Andrew	
July 5	"Let's Ride"	Vandell Andrew	
July 12	"Let's Ride"	Vandell Andrew	
July 19	"Let's Ride"	Vandell Andrew	
July 26	"Get Up and Dance"	Rick Braun	
August 2	"Get Up and Dance"	Rick Braun	
August 9	"Get Up and Dance"	Rick Braun	
August 16	"Get Up and Dance"	Rick Braun	
August 23	"Givin' It Up"	Richard Elliot	
August 30	"Get Up and Dance"	Rick Braun	
September 6	"African Breeze"	Jonathan Butler	
September 13	"African Breeze"	Jonathan Butler	
September 20	"African Breeze"	Jonathan Butler	
September 27	"Givin' It Up"	Richard Elliot	
October 4	"Serious Business"	Jazz Funk Soul	
October 11	"Serious Business"	Jazz Funk Soul	
October 18	"Serious Business"	Jazz Funk Soul	
October 25	"Slam Dunk"	Gerald Albright	
November 1	"Slam Dunk"	Gerald Albright	
November 8	"Slam Dunk"	Gerald Albright	
November 15	"Head Over Heels"	Peter White	
November 22	"Head Over Heels"	Peter White	
November 29	"Head Over Heels"	Peter White	
December 6	"Head Over Heels"	Peter White	
December 13	"Head Over Heels"	Peter White	
December 20	"Head Over Heels"	Peter White	
December 27	"Head Over Heels"	Peter White	
