= Yours Truly (Rick Braun album) =

Studio album by Rick Braun
- Released: 2005
- Recorded: 2004–2005
- Studios: Brauntosoarus Studio (Woodland Hills, California)
- Genre: Smooth jazz
- Length: 41:19
- Labels: ARTizen Music Group, Artistry Music
- Producer: Rick Braun

Rick Braun chronology
Sessions: Volume 1 (2004-2006)	Yours Truly (2005)	R n R (with Richard Elliot) (2007)

Yours Truly is the twelfth studio album from jazz trumpeter Rick Braun. It was released in 2005 on ARTizen Music, the label he co-founded with Richard Elliot (with whom Braun would also collaborate the following year).

The nine-track disc contains no original material. Instead, Braun has chosen to cover hit pop songs by bands as diverse as Sade, Simply Red and Earth, Wind & Fire. He also covers songs by John Mayer, Lisa Stansfield and Lou Reed.

Allmusic's Paula Edelstein gave the release a rating of four stars (of a possible five), stating, "this is classic Rick Braun in a mellow, melodic mood, transporting listeners with the rich tones of his muted trumpet voice through the musical landscape of his life."

== Track listing ==
1. "Shining Star" (originally by Earth, Wind & Fire; written by Phillip Bailey, Lorenzo Dunn & Maurice White) - 3:30
2. "Holding Back the Years" (originally by Simply Red; written by Mick Hucknall & Neil Moss) - 4:41
3. "Love's Theme" (originally by Barry White; written by White) - 4:36
4. "All Around The World" (originally by Lisa Stansfield; written by Stansfield, Ian Devaney & Andrew Morris) - 4:59
5. "Walk on the Wild Side" (originally by Lou Reed; written by Reed) - 4:05
6. "Daughters" (originally by John Mayer; written by Mayer) - 5:10
7. "Groove is in the Heart (originally by Deee-Lite; written by Dmitry Brill, Herbie Hancock & Kamaal Fareed) - 4:37
8. "Kiss of Life" (originally by Sade; written by Sade Adu, Paul S. Denman & Andrew Hale) - 4:48
9. "What Are You Doing the Rest of Your Life?" (originally by Michael Dees for the movie The Happy Ending; written by Alan Bergman, Marilyn Bergman & Michel Legrand) - 4:53

== Personnel ==
- Rick Braun – trumpet, flugelhorn
- Mitchel Forman – keyboards (1, 6), string arrangements (6)
- David Benoit – acoustic piano (9), string arrangements (9)
- John Pondel – guitars (1)
- Todd Sharp – guitars (2, 5)
- Ross Bolton – guitars (3, 4, 7, 8)
- Jeff Golub – guitars (6)
- David Dyson – bass (4)
- Stan Sargeant – bass (5, 6)
- Lenny Castro – percussion (1, 3, 4, 7–9)
- Bud Harner – drum brushes (5)
- Steve Kujala – flute (1)
- Craig Sharmat – orchestra arrangements (3), programming (9)
- Naughty Heidi – vocals (7)

=== Production ===
- Rick Braun – producer, recording, mixing
- Steve Hall – mastering at Future Disc (Hollywood, California)
- Michelle Laurençot – art direction, design
- Shawn Peterson – digital image assistant
- Lori Stoll – photography
- Steve Chapman – management
