= List of Billboard Smooth Jazz Airplay number-ones of 2023 =

The Smooth Jazz Airplay number-ones from Billboard for 2023.

== 2023 number-ones ==
2023
Issue date	Song	Artist(s)	Ref.
January 7	"Nothing Ever Hurt like You"	Mindi Abair	
January 14	"Let It Breathe"	Michael Broening	
January 21	"Let It Breathe"	Michael Broening	
January 28	"Let It Breathe"	Michael Broening	
February 4	"Let It Breathe"	Michael Broening	
February 11	"Convergency"	Candy Dulfer featuring Nile Rodgers	
February 18	"Nujazzy"	Bobby Lyle featuring Nathan East	
February 25	"Nujazzy"	Bobby Lyle featuring Nathan East	
March 4	"Nujazzy"	Bobby Lyle featuring Nathan East	
March 11	"Nujazzy"	Bobby Lyle featuring Nathan East	
March 18	"Stone Cold"	Pamela Williams	
March 25	"Nujazzy"	Bobby Lyle featuring Nathan East	
April 1	"It's Personal"	Jimmy B.	
April 8	"Lovers Melody"	Ryan La Valette featuring Nicholas Cole	
April 15	"Lovers Melody"	Ryan La Valette featuring Nicholas Cole	
April 22	"Lovers Melody"	Ryan La Valette featuring Nicholas Cole	
April 29	"Lovers Melody"	Ryan La Valette featuring Nicholas Cole	
May 6	"Lovers Melody"	Ryan La Valette featuring Nicholas Cole	
May 13	"Just like That"	Nick Colionne	
May 20	"Groove Central"	Lemek featuring Ryan La Valette	
May 27	"100% Cotton"	Nathan Mitchell featuring Marcus Anderson	
June 3	"Groove Central"	Lemek featuring Ryan La Valette	
June 10	"Groove Central"	Lemek featuring Ryan La Valette	
June 17	"Groove Central"	Lemek featuring Ryan La Valette	
June 24	"Groove Central"	Lemek featuring Ryan La Valette	
July 1	"On a Roll"	Quintin Gerard W.	
July 8	"On a Roll"	Quintin Gerard W.	
July 15	"On a Roll"	Quintin Gerard W.	
July 22	"Missing You"	Jackiem Joyner	
July 29	"Missing You"	Jackiem Joyner	
August 5	"Easy"	Tim Bowman	
August 12	"Easy"	Tim Bowman	
August 19	"Talk to Me"	Michael Broening featuring Marion Meadows	
August 26	"Taboo"	Damien Escobar	
September 2	"Taboo"	Damien Escobar	
September 9	"Solid"	Lin Rountree featuring Ryan La Valette	
September 16	"Static"	Mo Louis	
September 23	"Closer to You"	Ryan La Valette featuring Chris 'Big Dog' Davis	
September 30	"Closer to You"	Ryan La Valette featuring Chris 'Big Dog' Davis	
October 7	"Closer to You"	Ryan La Valette featuring Chris 'Big Dog' Davis	
October 14	"Closer to You"	Ryan La Valette featuring Chris 'Big Dog' Davis	
October 21	"Closer to You"	Ryan La Valette featuring Chris 'Big Dog' Davis	
October 28	"On My Way"	Phylicia Rae featuring Gerald Albright	
November 4	"1979"	Roberto Restuccia featuring Michael Broening	
November 11	"1979"	Roberto Restuccia featuring Michael Broening	
November 18	"Uptop"	Adam Hawley	
November 25	"Uptop"	Adam Hawley	
December 2	"South Bay"	Michael Lington	
December 9	"Twilight"	Randy Scott	
December 16	"Twilight"	Randy Scott	
December 23	"South Bay"	Michael Lington	
December 30	"South Bay"	Michael Lington	
