= List of Billboard Smooth Jazz Airplay number-ones of 2012 =

The Smooth Jazz Airplay number-ones from Billboard for 2012.

== 2012 number-ones ==
2012
Issue date	Song	Artist(s)	Ref.
January 7	"Boom Town"	Richard Elliot	
January 14	"Boom Town"	Richard Elliot	
January 21	"Boom Town"	Richard Elliot	
January 28	"Marrakesh"	Acoustic Alchemy	
February 4	"The Lady in My Life"	George Benson	
February 11	"The Lady in My Life"	George Benson	
February 18	"Marrakesh"	Acoustic Alchemy	
February 25	"Marrakesh"	Acoustic Alchemy	
March 3	"Marrakesh"	Acoustic Alchemy	
March 10	"Perfect Nites"	Najee	
March 17	"Oliver's Twist"	Chris Standring	
March 24	"Oliver's Twist"	Chris Standring	
March 31	"Oliver's Twist"	Chris Standring	
April 7	"Oliver's Twist"	Chris Standring	
April 14	"Oliver's Twist"	Chris Standring	
April 21	"Oliver's Twist"	Chris Standring	
April 28	"Here We Go"	Peter White	
May 5	"Big Brother"	Jeff Lorber Fusion	
May 12	"Big Brother"	Jeff Lorber Fusion	
May 19	"The Funky Joint"	Paul Brown	
May 26	"Here We Go"	Peter White	
June 2	"Here We Go"	Peter White	
June 9	"Here We Go"	Peter White	
June 16	"The Funky Joint"	Paul Brown	
June 23	"The Funky Joint"	Paul Brown	
June 30	"The Funky Joint"	Paul Brown	
July 7	"Your Smile"	Brian Culbertson	
July 14	"Your Smile"	Brian Culbertson	
July 21	"Island Style"	Richard Elliot	
July 28	"Your Smile"	Brian Culbertson	
August 4	"Namaste"	Kenny G and Rahul Sharma	
August 11	"Feelin' It"	David Benoit	
August 18	"Feelin' It"	David Benoit	
August 25	"Feelin' It"	David Benoit	
September 1	"Feelin' It"	David Benoit	
September 8	"Feelin' It"	David Benoit	
September 15	"In the Moment"	Gerald Albright / Norman Brown	
September 22	"Feelin' It"	David Benoit	
September 29	"In the Moment"	Gerald Albright / Norman Brown	
October 6	"City"	Jeff Lorber Fusion	
October 13	"On Your Feet"	Julian Vaughn	
October 20	"On Your Feet"	Julian Vaughn	
October 27	"Magical"	Jonathan Fritzén featuring Boney James	
November 3	"Magical"	Jonathan Fritzén featuring Boney James	
November 10	"Magical"	Jonathan Fritzén featuring Boney James	
November 17	"House of Groove"	Euge Groove	
November 24	"House of Groove"	Euge Groove	
December 1	"House of Groove"	Euge Groove	
December 8	"Sonnymoon"	Fourplay	
December 15	"Sonnymoon"	Fourplay	
December 22	"Inner City Blues (Make Me Wanna Holler)"	Richard Elliot	
December 29	"Backstage Pass"	Paul Brown featuring Bob James	
