= List of Billboard Smooth Jazz Airplay number-ones of 2016 =

The Smooth Jazz Airplay number-ones from Billboard for 2016.

== 2016 number-ones ==
2016
Issue date	Song	Artist(s)	Ref.
January 2	"Get Up"	Jeff Lorber Fusion	
January 9	"Get Up"	Jeff Lorber Fusion	
January 16	"Get Up"	Jeff Lorber Fusion	
January 23	"Get Up"	Jeff Lorber Fusion	
January 30	"Get Up"	Jeff Lorber Fusion	
February 6	"Get Up"	Jeff Lorber Fusion	
February 13	"Silverado"	Fourplay	
February 20	"Silverado"	Fourplay	
February 27	"Fool Me Once"	Lindsey Webster	
March 5	"Fool Me Once"	Lindsey Webster	
March 12	"Fool Me Once"	Lindsey Webster	
March 19	"Fool Me Once"	Lindsey Webster	
March 26	"Big Shot"	3rd Force	
April 2	"Big Shot"	3rd Force	
April 9	"Overdrive"	The JT Project	
April 16	"Overdrive"	The JT Project	
April 23	"Overdrive"	The JT Project	
April 30	"A Little Attitude"	Boney James	
May 7	"The Journey"	Nick Colionne	
May 14	"The Journey"	Nick Colionne	
May 21	"bwb"	bwb	
May 28	"D-Luxe"	Darren Rahn	
June 4	"D-Luxe"	Darren Rahn	
June 11	"35th Street"	Adam Hawley featuring Eric Darius	
June 18	"35th Street"	Adam Hawley featuring Eric Darius	
June 25	"35th Street"	Adam Hawley featuring Eric Darius	
July 2	"35th Street"	Adam Hawley featuring Eric Darius	
July 9	"35th Street"	Adam Hawley featuring Eric Darius	
July 16	"Cup of Joe"	Marcus Anderson featuring Matt Marshak	
July 23	"Cup of Joe"	Marcus Anderson featuring Matt Marshak	
July 30	"Still Euge"	Euge Groove	
August 6	"Mirage"	Steve Cole	
August 13	"B.F.A.M. (Brothers From Another Mother)"	Paul Jackson Jr.	
August 20	"B.F.A.M. (Brothers From Another Mother)"	Paul Jackson Jr.	
August 27	"B.F.A.M. (Brothers From Another Mother)"	Paul Jackson Jr.	
September 3	"B.F.A.M. (Brothers From Another Mother)"	Paul Jackson Jr.	
September 10	"Triple Dare"	bwb	
September 17	"Say What's on Your Mind"	Nick Colionne	
September 24	"Say What's on Your Mind"	Nick Colionne	
October 1	"Say What's on Your Mind"	Nick Colionne	
October 8	"Say What's on Your Mind"	Nick Colionne	
October 15	"Been Around the World"	Brian Culbertson	
October 22	"Laguna Beach"	Marc Antoine	
October 29	"Laguna Beach"	Marc Antoine	
November 5	"Taking Control"	Gerald Albright	
November 12	"Taking Control"	Gerald Albright	
November 19	"Taking Control"	Gerald Albright	
November 26	"Put It Where You Want It"	Paul Brown	
December 3	"Echoes Rising"	Paul Hardcastle	
December 10	"Echoes Rising"	Paul Hardcastle	
December 17	"Lifecycle"	Nathan East	
December 24	"Lifecycle"	Nathan East	
December 31	"Lifecycle"	Nathan East	
