= Down to the Bone =

Down to the Bone may refer to:

- Down to the Bone (album), a 1995 album by Quiet Riot, and its title track
- Down to the Bone (film), an independent film made in 2004
- Down to the Bone (band), a British jazz funk band active since 1996
