= List of Billboard Smooth Jazz Airplay number-ones of 2008 =

The Smooth Jazz Airplay number-ones from Billboard for 2008.

== 2008 number-ones ==
2008
| Issue date | Song | Artist(s) | Ref. |
|---|---|---|---|
| January 5 | "L.A. City Lights" | Candy Dulfer | |
| January 12 | "L.A. City Lights" | Candy Dulfer | |
| January 19 | "Let It Go" | Boney James | |
| January 26 | "L.A. City Lights" | Candy Dulfer | |
| February 2 | "Let It Go" | Boney James | |
| February 9 | "Blue Water" | Eric Marienthal | |
| February 16 | "Let It Go" | Boney James | |
| February 23 | "Lucky Star" | Paul Hardcastle | |
| March 1 | "Lucky Star" | Paul Hardcastle | |
| March 8 | "Lucky Star" | Paul Hardcastle | |
| March 15 | "Lucky Star" | Paul Hardcastle | |
| March 22 | "Lucky Star" | Paul Hardcastle | |
| March 29 | "Lucky Star" | Paul Hardcastle | |
| April 5 | "Sax-o-loco" | Kenny G | |
| April 12 | "Sax-o-loco" | Kenny G | |
| April 19 | "Sax-o-loco" | Kenny G | |
| April 26 | "Sax-o-loco" | Kenny G | |
| May 3 | "Sax-o-loco" | Kenny G | |
| May 10 | "Sax-o-loco" | Kenny G | |
| May 17 | "Sax-o-loco" | Kenny G | |
| May 24 | "Tequila Moon" | Jessy J | |
| May 31 | "Tequila Moon" | Jessy J | |
| June 7 | "Tequila Moon" | Jessy J | |
| June 14 | "Tequila Moon" | Jessy J | |
| June 21 | "Tequila Moon" | Jessy J | |
| June 28 | "Tequila Moon" | Jessy J | |
| July 5 | "Tequila Moon" | Jessy J | |
| July 12 | "Window of the Soul" | Chuck Loeb | |
| July 19 | "Always Remember" | Brian Culbertson | |
| July 26 | "Always Remember" | Brian Culbertson | |
| August 2 | "Fallin' for You" | The Sax Pack | |
| August 9 | "Fallin' for You" | The Sax Pack | |
| August 16 | "Fallin' for You" | The Sax Pack | |
| August 23 | "Fallin' for You" | The Sax Pack | |
| August 30 | "Fallin' for You" | The Sax Pack | |
| September 6 | "Fallin' for You" | The Sax Pack | |
| September 13 | "Fallin' for You" | The Sax Pack | |
| September 20 | "Fallin' for You" | The Sax Pack | |
| September 27 | "Fallin' for You" | The Sax Pack | |
| October 4 | "Fallin' for You" | The Sax Pack | |
| October 11 | "Life in the Fast Lane" | Dave Koz | |
| October 18 | "Goin' All Out" | Eric Darius | |
| October 25 | "Goin' All Out" | Eric Darius | |
| November 1 | "Life in the Fast Lane" | Dave Koz | |
| November 8 | "Life in the Fast Lane" | Dave Koz | |
| November 15 | "Life in the Fast Lane" | Dave Koz | |
| November 22 | "Life in the Fast Lane" | Dave Koz | |
| November 29 | "Life in the Fast Lane" | Dave Koz | |
| December 6 | "Life in the Fast Lane" | Dave Koz | |
| December 13 | "Sweet Sundays" | Tim Bowman | |
| December 20 | "Sweet Sundays" | Tim Bowman | |
| December 27 | "Sweet Sundays" | Tim Bowman | |
