= List of Billboard Smooth Jazz Airplay number-ones of 2011 =

The Smooth Jazz Airplay number-ones from Billboard for 2011.

== 2011 number-ones ==
2011
Issue date	Song	Artist(s)	Ref.
January 1	"Put the Top Down"	Dave Koz featuring Lee Ritenour	
January 8	"Put the Top Down"	Dave Koz featuring Lee Ritenour	
January 15	"Put the Top Down"	Dave Koz featuring Lee Ritenour	
January 22	"Put the Top Down"	Dave Koz featuring Lee Ritenour	
January 29	"Put the Top Down"	Dave Koz featuring Lee Ritenour	
February 5	"Put the Top Down"	Dave Koz featuring Lee Ritenour	
February 12	"Put the Top Down"	Dave Koz featuring Lee Ritenour	
February 19	"Put the Top Down"	Dave Koz featuring Lee Ritenour	
February 26	"Put the Top Down"	Dave Koz featuring Lee Ritenour	
March 5	"Put the Top Down"	Dave Koz featuring Lee Ritenour	
March 12	"Jump Start"	Nils	
March 19	"Jump Start"	Nils	
March 26	"Jump Start"	Nils	
April 2	"Jump Start"	Nils	
April 9	"Jump Start"	Nils	
April 16	"Jump Start"	Nils	
April 23	"Jump Start"	Nils	
April 30	"Jump Start"	Nils	
May 7	"Contact"	Boney James	
May 14	"Contact"	Boney James	
May 21	"Contact"	Boney James	
May 28	"Contact"	Boney James	
June 4	"Contact"	Boney James	
June 11	"Botswana Bossa Nova"	David Benoit	
June 18	"Botswana Bossa Nova"	David Benoit	
June 25	"Botswana Bossa Nova"	David Benoit	
July 2	"Botswana Bossa Nova"	David Benoit	
July 9	"Botswana Bossa Nova"	David Benoit	
July 16	"Botswana Bossa Nova"	David Benoit	
July 23	"Anything's Possible"	Dave Koz	
July 30	"Anything's Possible"	Dave Koz	
August 6	"Push to Start"	Paul Taylor	
August 13	"Push to Start"	Paul Taylor	
August 20	"Push to Start"	Paul Taylor	
August 27	"Push to Start"	Paul Taylor	
September 3	"Push to Start"	Paul Taylor	
September 10	"Massive Transit"	Cindy Bradley	
September 17	"Massive Transit"	Cindy Bradley	
September 24	"Massive Transit"	Cindy Bradley	
October 1	"Massive Transit"	Cindy Bradley	
October 8	"Spin"	Boney James	
October 15	"Spin"	Boney James	
October 22	"Spin"	Boney James	
October 29	"Spin"	Boney James	
November 5	"Easy Come Easy Go"	Paul Hardcastle	
November 12	"Easy Come Easy Go"	Paul Hardcastle	
November 19	"Easy Come Easy Go"	Paul Hardcastle	
November 26	"Boom Town"	Richard Elliot	
December 3	"Boom Town"	Richard Elliot	
December 10	"Boom Town"	Richard Elliot	
December 17	"Boom Town"	Richard Elliot	
December 24	"Boom Town"	Richard Elliot	
December 31	"Boom Town"	Richard Elliot	
