= Steve Oliver =

American guitarist, vocalist, and songwriter

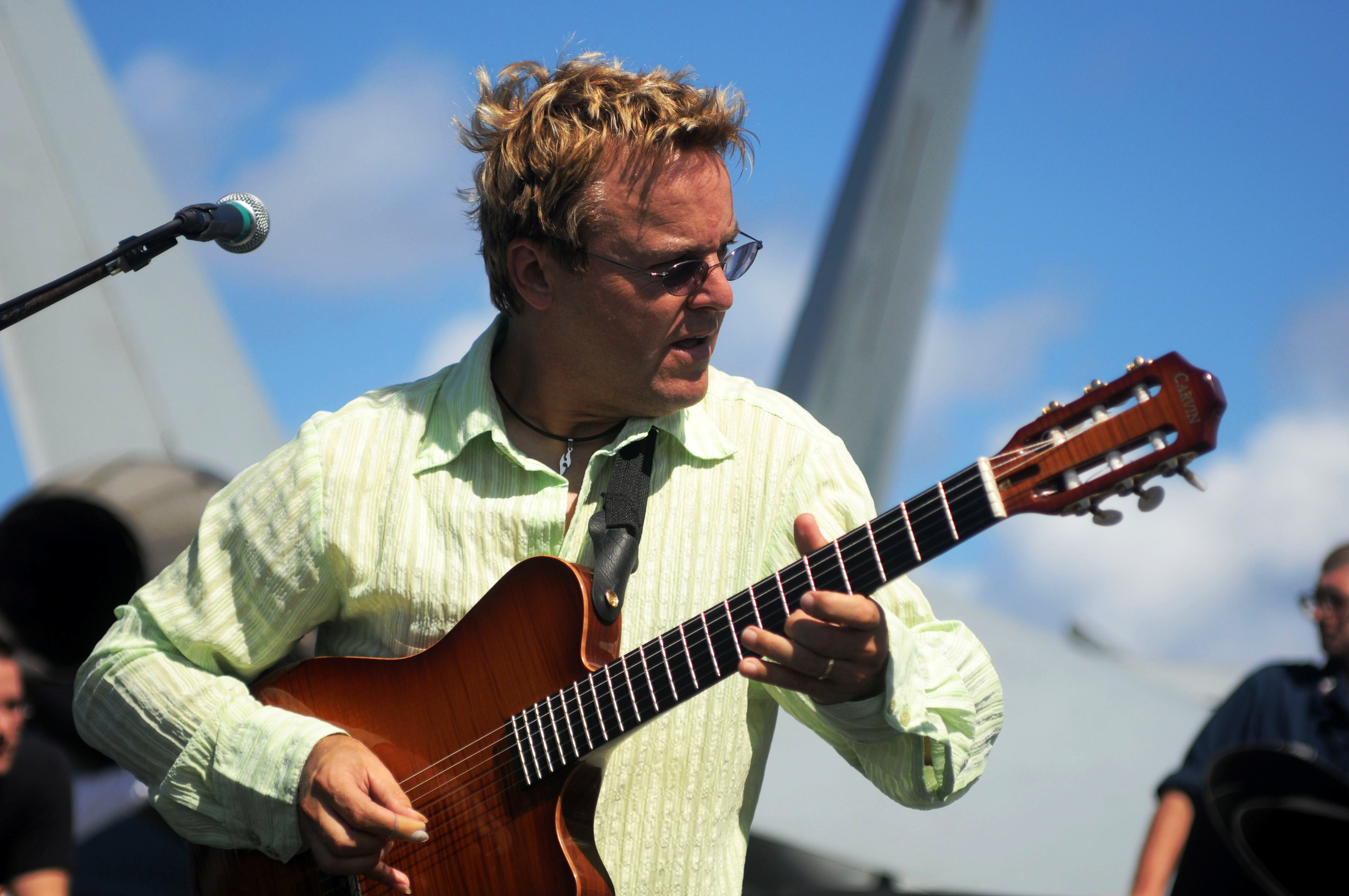
A concert with Steve Oliver on the aircraft carrier USS Ronald Reagan

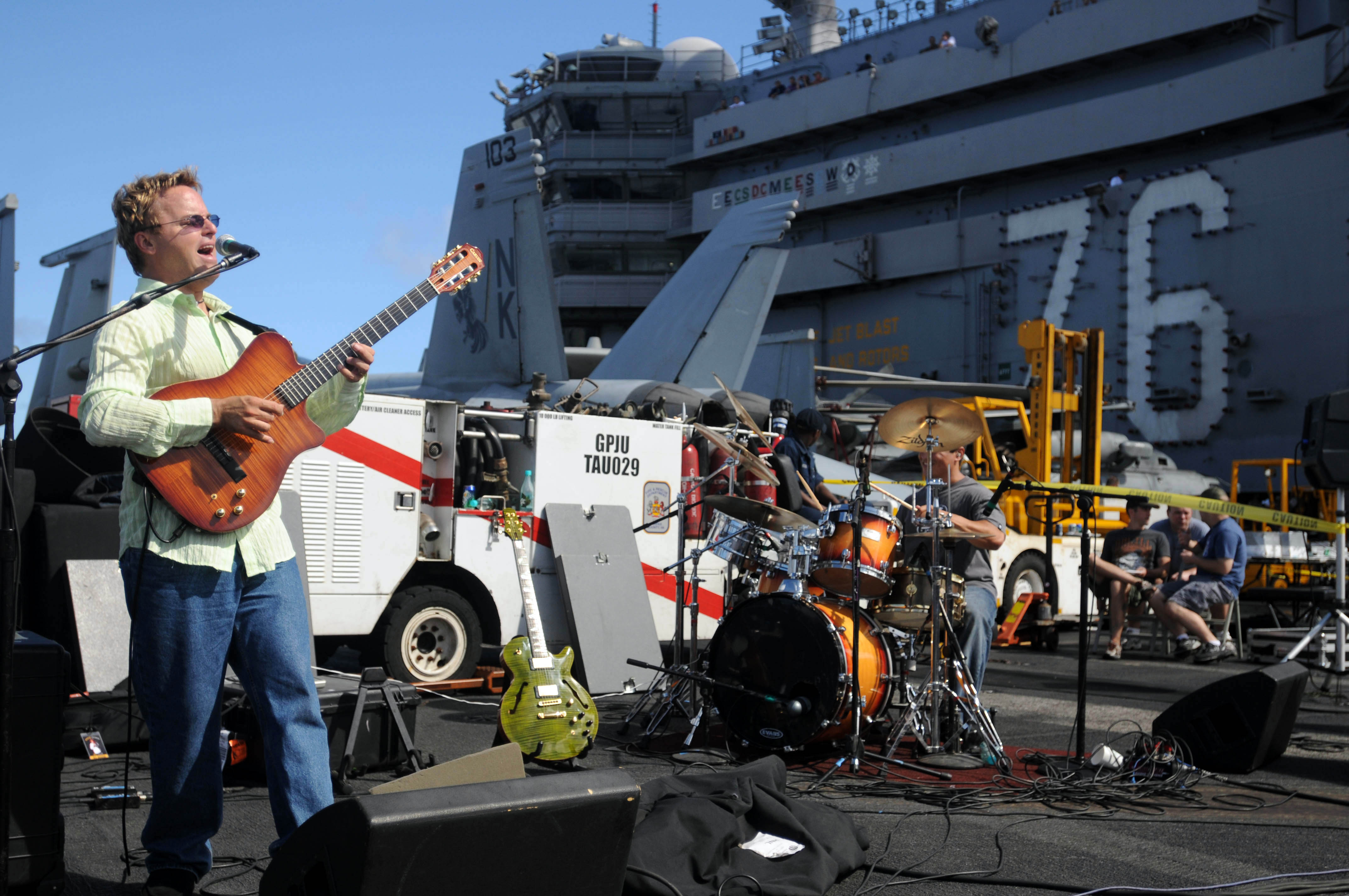
A concert with Steve Oliver on the aircraft carrier USS Ronald Reagan

Steve Oliver (born January 11, 1962) is an American musician, guitarist, vocalist, songwriter, and producer. Although best known for his work in the field of contemporary or “smooth” jazz, he performs in a wide variety of styles including pop, rock, Latin, electronic, and world music. A prolific performer, Oliver tours regularly and has scored multiple hit singles on the Billboard contemporary jazz chart.

== Accolades and accomplishments ==
- 3 number 1 singles on Billboard contemporary jazz chart.
- 13 Top 20 singles on Billboard contemporary jazz chart.
- Two time Canadian Smooth Jazz Awards nominee for best international artist.
- “Fun in the Sun” from the album “Global Kiss” was number 1 on the Billboard contemporary jazz chart for 8 weeks.

== Discography ==
=== Studio albums ===
- First View (1999)
- Positive Energy (2002)
- 3D (2004)
- Radiant (2006)
- Snowfall (2006)
- Global Kiss (2010)
- World Citizen (2012)
- Pictures & Frames (2016)
- Illuminate (2018)
- Unified (2020) with Brian Simpson
- Sojourn (2022)
- A New Light (29.09.2023)

=== Live albums ===
- One Night Live (2008) with DVD

=== Charted albums ===
Year	Title	Peak chart positions		Label
Year	Title	US Jazz	US Con. Jazz	Label
2003	Positive Energy	34	25	Koch
2004	3D	46	—	Koch
2006	Radiant	46	—	Koch
2008	One Night Live	45	—	nuGroove
2020	Unified – (Brian Simpson and Steve Oliver)	21	4	Shanachie
"—" denotes a recording that did not chart.

=== Charted singles ===
Year	Title	Peak chart positions	Album
Year	Title	Smooth Jazz Airplay	Album
2008	"On the Upside" (Steve Oliver featuring Warren Hill)	25	One Night Live
2009	"Carol of the Bells"	19	Snowfall
2010	"Fun in the Sun"	1	Global Kiss
2011	"Global Kiss"	2	Global Kiss
2012	"Horizon" (Paul Taylor featuring Steve Oliver)	4	Paul Taylor – Prime Time
2012	"Watching the World"	16	World Citizen
2013	"World Citizen"	12	World Citizen
2014	"Calling You"	29	Best Of... So Far
2018	"Vamonos"	30	Illuminate
2019	"Illuminate"	4	Illuminate
2020	"Unified" (Brian Simpson and Steve Oliver)	5	Brian Simpson and Steve Oliver – Unified
2021	"The Road Never Ends" (Brian Simpson and Steve Oliver)	24	Brian Simpson and Steve Oliver – Unified
2021	"Slingshot"	25	A New Light
2023	"Skyway"	6	A New Light
2024	"A Kind Heart"	6	A New Light
2025	"Freedom Drive"	21	A New Light
2025	"Living a Dream" (Phillip Doc Martin featuring Steve Oliver	28	Phillip Doc Martin – TBA
2026	"Dancing in the Sand" (Steve Oliver featuring Peter White)	3	TBA
