= List of Billboard Smooth Jazz Airplay number-ones of 2005 =

The Smooth Jazz Airplay number-ones from Billboard for 2005.

== 2005 number-ones ==
2005
Issue date	Song	Artist(s)	Ref.
October 22	"Serene"	Paul Hardcastle	
October 29	"Serene"	Paul Hardcastle	
November 5	"Hookin' Up"	Brian Culbertson	
November 12	"Hookin' Up"	Brian Culbertson	
November 19	"Hookin' Up"	Brian Culbertson	
November 26	"Hookin' Up"	Brian Culbertson	
December 3	"Get 'Em Goin'"	Euge Groove	
December 10	"Get 'Em Goin'"	Euge Groove	
December 17	"Get 'Em Goin'"	Euge Groove	
December 24	"Get 'Em Goin'"	Euge Groove	
December 31	"Get 'Em Goin'"	Euge Groove	
