= List of Billboard Smooth Jazz Airplay number-ones of 2018 =

The Smooth Jazz Airplay number-ones from Billboard for 2018.

== 2018 number-ones ==
2018
Issue date	Song	Artist(s)	Ref.
January 6	"Baby Coffee"	Michael J Thomas	
January 13	"Pass the Groove"	Lin Rountree	
January 20	"Pass the Groove"	Lin Rountree	
January 27	"Pass the Groove"	Lin Rountree	
February 3	"Groove On"	Euge Groove	
February 10	"Groove On"	Euge Groove	
February 17	"Groove On"	Euge Groove	
February 24	"Buckle Up"	Nick Colionne	
March 3	"Buckle Up"	Nick Colionne	
March 10	"Colors of Love"	Brian Culbertson	
March 17	"Colors of Love"	Brian Culbertson	
March 24	"Colors of Love"	Brian Culbertson	
March 31	"Colors of Love"	Brian Culbertson	
April 7	"On the Prowl"	Boney James	
April 14	"On the Prowl"	Boney James	
April 21	"On the Prowl"	Boney James	
April 28	"Can You Feel It?"	Adam Hawley featuring Marcus Anderson	
May 5	"Can You Feel It?"	Adam Hawley featuring Marcus Anderson	
May 12	"Can You Feel It?"	Adam Hawley featuring Marcus Anderson	
May 19	"Everyone but You"	Cindy Bradley	
May 26	"Everyone but You"	Cindy Bradley	
June 2	"Everyone but You"	Cindy Bradley	
June 9	"Ready to Go"	ThreeStyle featuring Magdalena Chovancova	
June 16	"Ready to Go"	ThreeStyle featuring Magdalena Chovancova	
June 23	"Up and Up"	Jeff Ryan	
June 30	"Up and Up"	Jeff Ryan	
July 7	"Up and Up"	Jeff Ryan	
July 14	"Up and Up"	Jeff Ryan	
July 21	"Corey's Bop"	Ragan Whiteside	
July 28	"You're Magic"	Brian Culbertson	
August 4	"You're Magic"	Brian Culbertson	
August 11	"You're Magic"	Brian Culbertson	
August 18	"You're Magic"	Brian Culbertson	
August 25	"Switch Up"	Phil Denny	
September 1	"Up All Night"	Boney James	
September 8	"Up All Night"	Boney James	
September 15	"Up All Night"	Boney James	
September 22	"Up All Night"	Boney James	
September 29	"Boogaloo"	Paul Brown	
October 6	"Boogaloo"	Paul Brown	
October 13	"Coupe De Ville"	Brian Bromberg	
October 20	"Traveling Mood"	Adam Hawley featuring Julian Vaughn	
October 27	"Traveling Mood"	Adam Hawley featuring Julian Vaughn	
November 3	"Traveling Mood"	Adam Hawley featuring Julian Vaughn	
November 10	"Traveling Mood"	Adam Hawley featuring Julian Vaughn	
November 17	"Groovers and Shakers"	Blake Aaron featuring Darren Rahn	
November 24	"Zephyr"	Kayla Waters	
December 1	"Zephyr"	Kayla Waters	
December 8	"Zephyr"	Kayla Waters	
December 15	"Zephyr"	Kayla Waters	
December 22	"Snap, Crackle, Pop"	Vincent Ingala	
December 29	"Snap, Crackle, Pop"	Vincent Ingala	
