= Brian Simpson (musician) =

American contemporary jazz pianist and composer

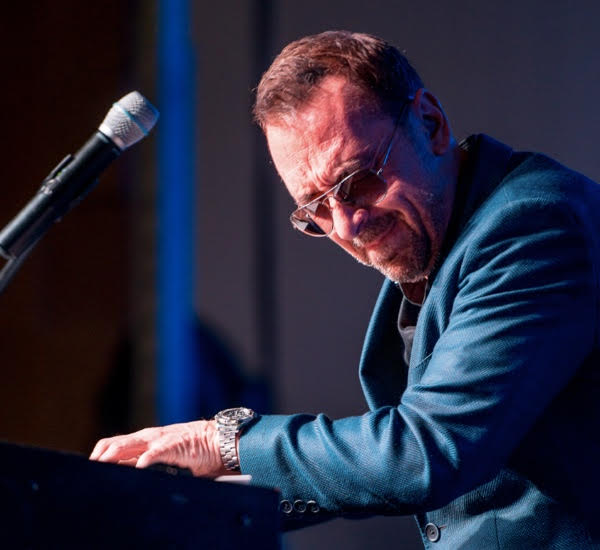

Background information
- Born: Brian Simpson; May 11, 1961 (age 65)
- Origin: Gurnee, Illinois, United States
- Genres: Smooth jazz, contemporary jazz, R&B
- Occupations: Musician, composer, producer
- Instrument: Piano
- Years active: 1995–present
- Website: bsimpsonmusic.com

Brian Simpson (born May 11, 1961) is an American contemporary jazz pianist and composer. He has released 12 albums as a solo artist, his most recent, Midnight Groove, released in 2025.

== Biography ==
Simpson was born May 11, 1961, and raised in Gurnee, Illinois, to music-oriented parents. His father was a fan of jazz music, and Simpson says, "Our house was filled with music. I never really considered any other lifestyle." The musician also states that his brother and sister both played instruments. At the age of ten, he began to play the piano. He states that while he initially preferred the sound of jazz guitar, the main individual who influenced his piano tastes was Oscar Peterson. Simpson then graduated from Northern Illinois University, earning a Bachelor's of Arts degree in music (piano).

Soon after graduating, Simpson moved to Los Angeles in order to take part in the music scene there. He played with several jazz artists, including Boney James, Norman Brown and Everette Harp. His career took a twist when he later toured with multiple pop stars including Janet Jackson, co-writing a major pop hit The First Time, before returning to jazz. Simpson has worked with smooth jazz musicians including Dave Koz, Jonathan Butler, Gerald Albright and Marc Antoine throughout his career.

His debut album Closer Still, released in 1995, features smooth jazz tracks played on the piano, saxophone and guitar. Simpson did the composing, producing and engineering for the album as well as playing the keyboard. Simpson's second album, It's All Good, was released in 2005. It features guest artists including Dave Koz (tenor sax), Everette Harp (alto sax) and Allen Hinds (guitar). The album peaked at No. 37 on Billboard's Top Jazz Albums. The song Saturday Cool from the album reached a high of No. 15 on Billboard's Top Smooth Jazz Songs.

Above the Clouds (released in 2007), Simpson's third album, features Michael Brecker, George Duke, Dave Koz, Chuck Loeb, Wayman Tisdale and Kirk Whalum as the primary artists in addition to Simpson. On Billboard, the album topped out at No. 21 on the top jazz albums, and on the top smooth jazz songs list, What Cha Gonna Do? topped at No. 9 and Juicy reached a high point of No. 21. 2010 saw the release of his next album, South Beach, his first album to crack the top 15 in the top jazz albums on Billboard, getting to No. 14. It is also his first album to be released under the Shanachie label. Headlining artists on his fourth album are George Duke on synth, Euge Groove on tenor sax and Peter White on guitar. Songs placing on the top smooth jazz list include both the album's namesake song at No. 11 and Lay It On Me at No. 28.

Brian Simpson's fifth album, Just What You Need (released in 2013), presents a collection of smooth jazz pieces with lite rhythm & blues. The song of the same name achieved a high of No. 3 on Billboard's smooth jazz song list while Emerald City reached No. 9; the album itself placed at No. 6 on the jazz album list. Albright, Antoine, Butler, Koz and Elan Trotman are the spotlighted musicians, while Simpson composes, produces and performs the piano. Out of a Dream came almost 2 years later and stars Jonathan Fritzén, Norman Brown, Maysa and Najee, among others. On Billboard, When I Say Your Name and Sky Watcher peaked at No. 12 and No. 6 respectively on the top smooth jazz song list, and the album reached No. 8 on the top jazz albums.

Simpson's seventh album, Persuasion, was released in late 2016. He has toured with many varying artists in countries including Barbados, the Caribbean, the United Kingdom and the United States, and he later plans to tour in Indonesia, Mexico and Spain. In addition, he has spent almost a decade as the musical director of the "Dave Koz and Friends Cruise" and of "The Smooth Jazz Cruise", and has won the American Smooth Jazz Keyboardist of the Year award. Just What You Need finished at No. 5 on SmoothJazz.com's Year End 2013 Top 50 Albums, and Out of a Dream placed at No. 21 on the 2015 list.

== Discography ==
Closer Still (1995)

It's All Good (2005)

Above the Clouds (2007)

South Beach (2010)

Just What You Need (2013)

Out of a Dream (2015)

Persuasion (2016)

Something About You (2018)

Unified (with Steve Oliver) (2020)

All That Matters (2021)

Soul Connection (2023)

Midnight Groove (2025)
