= Lindsey Webster =

American singer

- Born: January 19, 1988 (age 38); Woodstock, New York, U.S.
- Genres: Smooth jazz; traditional pop; R&B; Jazz Pop; Jazz Rock; Soul Jazz
- Occupation: Singer
- Instrument: Vocals
- Years active: 2013–present
- Label: Shanachie
- Website: www.lindseywebstermusic.com

Lindsey Webster (born January 19, 1988) is an American jazz, R&B, and pop singer. Her first single, "Fool Me Once", reached number one on the Smooth Jazz chart at Billboard magazine (2016), making her the first vocalist since Sade's 2010 "Soldier of Love" to have a #1 vocally-driven song in the primarily instrumental format. Since then Webster has scored six Top 5 hits, including "Where Do You Want To Go" (#1), Back To Your Heart (#2), Open Up (#3), Next To Me (#3), & Love Inside.

Webster was born in Woodstock, New York, and as a child played the cello. She became interested in singing and studied at the Fiorello H. LaGuardia High School of Music & Art and Performing Arts. She released her first album independently in 2013.

== Discography ==
=== Albums ===
Year	Album	Label
2013	Lindsey Webster	Maxophone Music
2015	You Change	Atlanta Records (Note: 2023 Maxophone re-issue)
2016	Back to Your Heart	Shanachie
2018	Love Inside	Shanachie
2020	A Woman Like Me	Shanachie
2022	Reasons	Shanachie
2026	Music in Me	Shanachie

=== Charted singles ===
Year	Title	Peak chart positions	Album	Ref.
Year	Title	Smooth Jazz Airplay	Album	Ref.
2016	"Fool Me Once"	1	You Change	
2016	"Open Up"	3	You Change	
2016	"Back to Your Heart"	3	Back to Your Heart	
2017	"Where Do You Want to Go?"	1	Back to Your Heart	
2017	"Next to Me"	4	Back to Your Heart	
2018	"Love Inside"	3	Love Inside	
2018	"It's Not You, It's Me" (Lindsey Webster featuring Rick Braun)	9	Love Inside	
2019	"A Love Before"	16	Love Inside	
2019	"Don't Give Up on Me"	29	Love Inside	
2020	"Feels like Forever"	14	A Woman Like Me	
2020	"One Step Forward"	21	A Woman Like Me	
2021	"Close to You"	6	A Woman Like Me	
2021	"Only You"	17	A Woman Like Me	
2022	"I Didn't Mean It" (Lindsey Webster featuring Brian Culbertson)	5	Reasons	
2022	"Stay with Me" (Lindsey Webster featuring Randy Brecker)	7	Reasons	
2023	"I'm OK" (Lindsey Webster featuring Nicholas Payton)	19	Reasons	
2023	"The Way"	2	Reasons	
2024	"Love of Your Life" (Lindsey Webster featuring Nathan East)	9	Reasons	
2026	"Music in Me"	3	Music in Me	
2026	"What Is Meant to Be"	3	Music in Me	
"—" denotes a recording that did not chart.
