= Down to the Bone (band) =

British acid jazz band

Down to the Bone is an acid jazz group led by British DJ Stuart Wade, who formed the band in 1996 with Chris Morgans (who later left). The group was popular in the UK, where it is "hailed as the kings of UK jazz groove." The band's music is a mix of funk and jazz.

As of 2014 there are two sets of Personnel for the band – a US band and a UK band.

== The music ==
Stuart Wade, the band's leader, does not play any instruments. He hums into a dictaphone.

== Discography ==
=== Studio albums ===
Year	Album	Peak chart positions		Label
Year	Album	US Jazz	US Con. Jazz	Label
1998	From Manhattan to Staten	3	2	Internal Bass; Q Records; Narada Jazz; Trippin 'N' Rhythm
1999	The Urban Grooves – Album II	13	9	Internal Bass; Q Records; Narada Jazz; Trippin 'N' Rhythm
2001	Spread The Word – Album III	19	6	Internal Bass; Q Records; Narada Jazz; Trippin 'N' Rhythm
2002	Crazy Vibes and Things	6	4	GRP
2004	Cellar Funk	4	4	Narada Jazz
2005	Spread Love Like Wildfire	10	5	Narada Jazz
2007	Supercharged	12	4	Narada Jazz
2009	Future Boogie	16	10	Shanachie
2011	The Main Ingredients	12	7	Dome; Trippin 'N' Rhythm
2014	Dig It	7	4	Dome; Trippin 'N' Rhythm

=== Compilation albums ===
Year	Album	Peak chart positions		Label
Year	Album	US Jazz	US Con. Jazz	Label
2007	The Best of Down to the Bone	19	8	Narada Jazz
2019	Funkin' Around: A Collection of Remixes and Reworks	—	—	Dome

== Singles ==
Year	Title	Peak chart positions	Album
Year	Title	Smooth Jazz Airplay	Album
2007	"Parkside Shuffle"	10	Supercharged
2011	"Music Is the Key"	14	The Main Ingredients
2012	"Uptown Hustle"	10	The Main Ingredients
2014	"The Sweetness"	1	Dig It
2015	"The Bounce"	11	Dig It
2026	"Umph!"	28	This Way Forward
