= The Sax Pack =

American smooth jazz group

The Sax Pack is a smooth jazz trio of saxophone players: Jeff Kashiwa, Steve Cole, and Kim Waters, all of whom already have successful careers and discographies of their own.

Their albums have reached number 13 and number 16 on the Billboard chart. In 2012 Marcus Anderson become an official touring and recording member of The Sax Pack with Kashiwa and Cole, replacing Waters. In 2015 The Power of 3 was released, with Waters returning for the studio production.

== Discography ==
- The Sax Pack (Shanachie, 2008)
- The Pack Is Back (Shanachie, 2009)
- The Power of 3 (Shanachie, 2015)
