= Mornin' =

Song by Al Jarreau

Single by Al Jarreau

from the album Jarreau
- B-side: "Not Like This" (U.S.); "Black and Blues" (International)
- Released: March 1983
- Genre: Soul; Jazz
- Length: 4:16
- Label: Warner Brothers
- Songwriters: Al Jarreau, David Foster, Jay Graydon
- Producer: Jay Graydon

Al Jarreau singles chronology
"Teach Me Tonight" (1982)	"Mornin'" (1983)	"Boogie Down" (1983)

Music video
- "Mornin'" (Official Music Video) on YouTube

"Mornin'" is a 1983 hit song by Al Jarreau, billed simply as 'Jarreau'. It was the first of three single releases from his sixth studio album, Jarreau. The song's music video was mostly animated, with Jarreau himself starring in a live-action role.

"Mornin'" again reached the music charts in 2006 when Jarreau reworked the song with George Benson on their collaborative album Givin' It Up. "Mornin'" reached #1 on the US Jazz charts.

== Personnel ==
- Al Jarreau - vocals
- David Foster - keyboards, synthesizers, rhythm arrangements
- Jay Graydon - guitar, rhythm arrangements
- Abe Laboriel - bass guitar
- Jeff Porcaro - drums
- Jeremy Lubbock - string arrangements

== Chart history ==
Chart (1983)	Peak position
Australian (Kent Music Report)	82
Belgium (Ultratop 50 Flanders)	26
Canada Adult Contemporary (RPM)	3
France	119
Ireland (IRMA)	13
Netherlands (Dutch Top 40)	16
Netherlands (Single Top 100)	24
UK Singles (Official Charts)	28
US Billboard Hot 100	21
US Adult Contemporary (Billboard)	2
US Hot R&B/Hip-Hop Songs (Billboard)	6
US Cash Box Top 100	25

Chart (2006)	Peak position
US Jazz	1
