= Jeff Golub =

American guitarist (1955–2015)

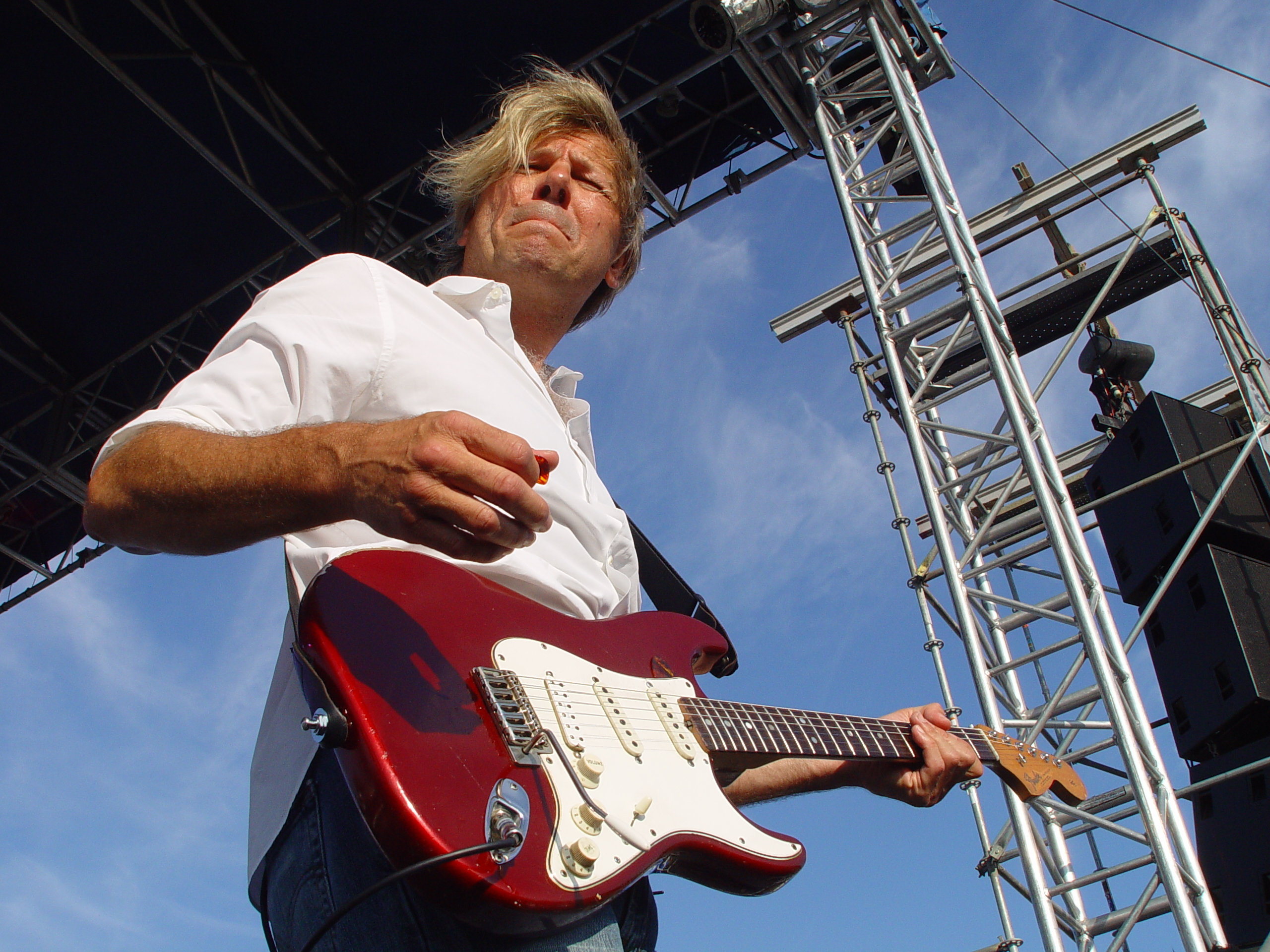

Background information
- Born: April 15, 1955; Copley Township, Ohio, US
- Died: January 1, 2015 (aged 59) New York City, US
- Genres: Jazz, rock, blues, smooth jazz
- Occupations: Musician, songwriter
- Instrument: Guitar
- Years active: 1980–2014
- Labels: Atlantic, GRP
- Website: www.jeffgolub.com

Jeff Golub (April 15, 1955 – January 1, 2015) was an American jazz guitarist who had a solo career and who led the band Avenue Blue. He worked as a sideman for a number of rock and pop musicians. He was arguably best known for his work with Rod Stewart.

== Career ==
Golub was born in Copley Township, Ohio, near Akron. He grew up listening to pop music, rock, blues, funk, and R&B. In the 1970s, he attended the Berklee College of Music in Boston. 1980, he moved to New York city, and worked for rock guitarist Billy Squier. During the 1980s and '90s, he worked as a sideman for Ashford & Simpson, Tina Turner, John Waite, Dar Williams, Vanessa Williams, and Peter Wolf. 1988–95, he recorded and toured with Rod Stewart. Jeff also played guitar on Grayson Hugh's 1992 MCA album "Road To Freedom".

He was a member of Dave Koz and the Kozmos, the house band of The Emeril Lagasse Show.

In 1988, Golub released his first solo album Unspoken Words; in 1994, he formed the band Avenue Blue, and the group released its first album Avenue Blue Featuring Jeff Golub. For the album Out of the Blue (Atlantic, 1999), he dropped the Avenue Blue prefix and recorded simply as Jeff Golub. He recorded a blues album with Billy Squier, Peter Wolf, and John Waite, and an album with blind jazz pianist Henry Butler in 2011.

== Illness ==
In 2011, Golub lost his eyesight from pressure on his optic nerve. In September 2012, he fell on the tracks of a subway, but was saved by people nearby. He was taken to the hospital with minor injuries. Soon after, he released the album Train Keeps A Rolling with keyboardist Brian Auger.

In 2014, Golub was diagnosed with progressive supranuclear palsy. He died from the disease on January 1, 2015, at the age of 59.

== Discography ==
=== As leader ===
- Unspoken Words (Gaia, 1988)
- Avenue Blue Featuring Jeff Golub (Bluemoon, 1994)
- Naked City (Bluemoon, 1996)
- Nightlife (Bluemoon, 1997)
- Out of the Blue (Bluemoon/Atlantic, 1999)
- Dangerous Curves (GRP, 2000)
- Do It Again (GRP, 2002)
- Soul Sessions (GRP, 2003)
- Temptation (Narada, 2005)
- Grand Central (Narada, 2007)
- Six String Santa (Metro Café, 2007)
- Blues for You (E1, 2009)
- The Three Kings (E1, 2011)
- Train Keeps A Rolling with Brian Auger (E1, 2013)
- The Vault (E1, 2015)

=== As sideman ===
With Rick Braun

- Night Walk (Bluemoon/Rhino, 1994)
- Beat Street (Bluemoon/Atlantic, 1995)
- Body and Soul (Bluemoon/Atlantic, 1997)
- Full Stride (Atlantic, 1998)
- Kisses in the Rain (Warner Bros, 2001)
- Yours Truly (Artizen, 2005)
- Sessions Volume 1 (Artizen, 2006)

With Billy Squier

- Emotions in Motion (Capitol, 1982)
- Signs of Life (Capitol, 1984)
- Enough Is Enough (Capitol, 1986)
- Hear & Now (Capitol, 1989)
- Creatures of Habit (Capitol, 1991)
- Tell the Truth (Capitol, 1993)

With Rod Stewart

- Vagabond Heart (Warner Bros., 1991)
- Unplugged ...and Seated (Warner Bros., 1993)
- A Spanner in the Works (Warner Bros., 1995)

With others

- Marc Antoine, Universal Language (Verve, 2000)
- Gato Barbieri, Que Pasa (Columbia, 1997)
- David Benoit, Conversation (Heads Up, 2012)
- David Broza, Away From Home (EMI, 1989)
- Steve Cole, True (Narada, 2006)
- Richard Elliot, Crush (GRP, 2001)
- Bill Evans, The Alternative Man (Blue Note, 1985)
- Bill Evans, Push (Lipstick, 1994)
- Steve Ferrone, More Head (Drumroll, 2006)
- Euge Groove, S7ven Large (Shanachie, 2011)
- Everette Harp, For the Love (Blue Note, 2000)
- Marcia Hines, Time of Our Lives (WEA, 1999)
- Grayson Hugh, Road to Freedom (MCA, 1992)
- Bob James & Kirk Whalum, Joined at the Hip (Evosound, 2019)
- Michael Lington, Pure (Trippin 'n' Rhythm, 2012)
- Jimmy Norman, Little Pieces (Wildflower, 2004)
- Philippe Saisse, Halfway 'Til Dawn (GRP, 1999)
- Philippe Saisse, At World's Edge (Koch, 2009)
- Miu Sakamoto, Dawn Pink (WEA Japan, 1999)
- Paul Shaffer, Coast to Coast (Capitol, 1989)
- Tina Turner, Simply the Best (Capitol, 1991)
- Randy VanWarmer, Beat of Love (Bearsville, 1981)
- Kirk Whalum, Everything Is Everything (Mack Avenue, 2010)
- Cheryl Wheeler, Mrs. Pinocci's Guitar (Philo, 1995)
- Bernie Williams, Moving Forward (in-akustik, 2010)
- Dar Williams, End of the Summer (Razor & Tie, 1997)
- Peter Wolf, Come As You Are (EMI, 1987)
