= Walter Beasley =

American saxophonist and music professor

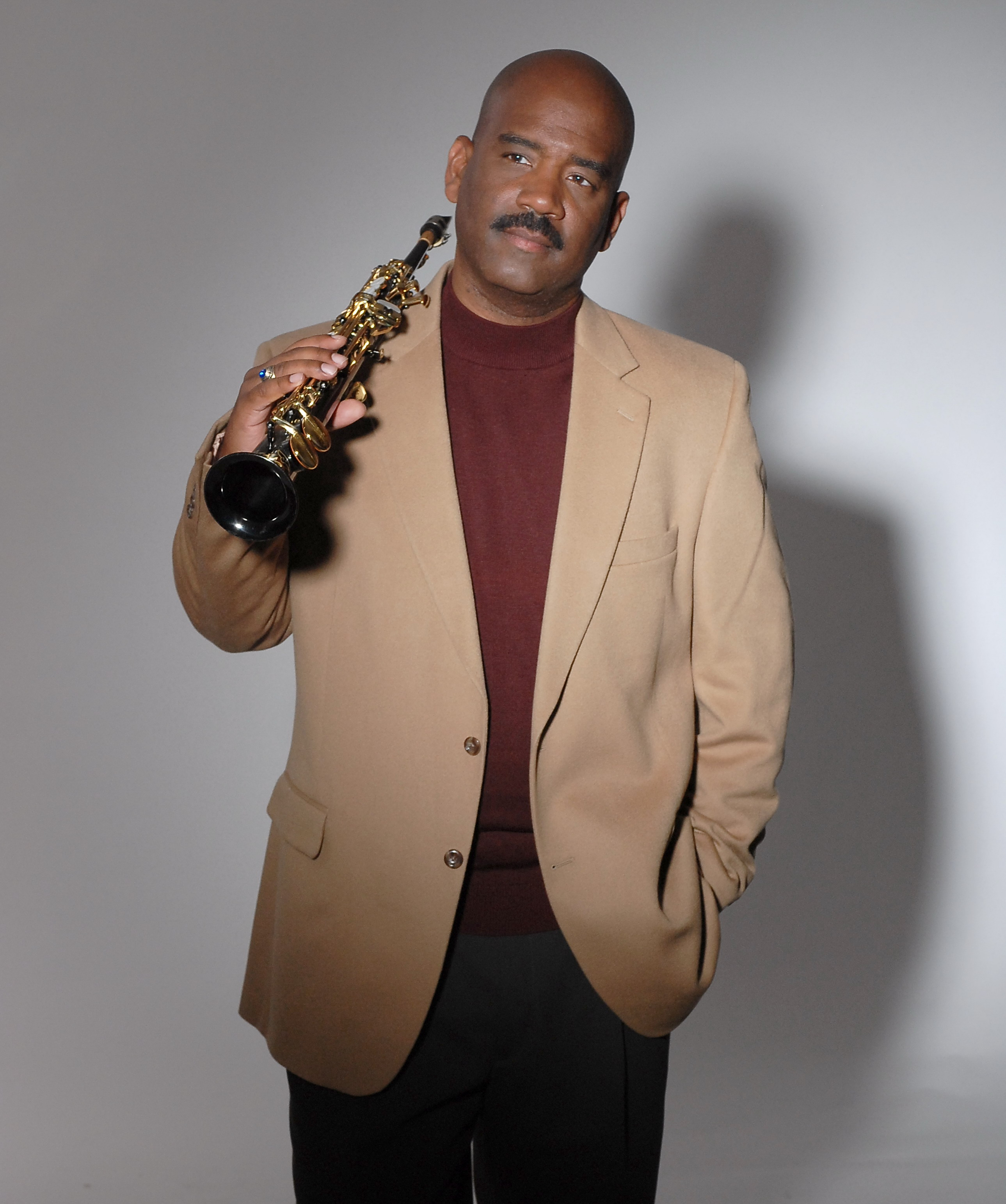

Background information
- Born: Walter Beasley; May 24, 1961 (age 65)
- Origin: El Centro, California, United States
- Genres: Smooth Jazz, R&B
- Occupations: Musician, professor, recording artist, performer, composer
- Instruments: Soprano saxophone, alto saxophone, voice
- Labels: Shanachie Records; Warner Bros. Records; Mercury Records; Headsup/Affable Records
- Website: walterbeasley.com

Walter Beasley (born May 24, 1961) is an American saxophonist, a professor of music at the Berklee College of Music, and founder of Affable Publishing and Affable Records.

== Biography ==
Beasley grew up in El Centro, California. By the age of 13 he was singing in Spanish in a band called Los Elegantes, and he played in various bands and performed at clubs throughout middle and high school.

Beasley graduated from Berklee in 1984, and a year later took a short-term teaching position at the same school, which became a permanent career. He is now a professor at the school.

In 1987, he released his first, self-titled, album, and since 1998 has been one of the top ten best-selling African American saxophonists in the world. Having grown up as a fan of R&B and funk and trained in classical and jazz saxophone, his own style falls between contemporary R&B and contemporary jazz, a blend which has been called "smooth jazz".

He is not only an alto and soprano saxophonist and a singer, but also a composer and producer. He is the founder and CEO of Affable Publishing, and the owner of Affable Records.

== Discography ==
=== Albums ===
| Year | Album | Peak chart positions | | | | Label |
| Year | Album | US Jazz | US Con. Jazz | US R&B /HH | US Ind | Label |
|---|---|---|---|---|---|---|
| 1988 | Walter Beasley | — | 25 | 72 | — | Mercury/ Polydor/ PolyGram/ UMG |
| 1989 | Just Kickin' It | — | — | — | — | Mercury/ Polydor/ PolyGram/ UMG |
| 1993 | Intimacy | — | — | 56 | — | Mercury/ Polydor/ PolyGram/ UMG |
| 1995 | Private Time | — | — | — | — | Mercury/ Polydor/ PolyGram/ UMG |
| 1996 | Live and More | — | — | — | — | Affable |
| 1997 | Tonight We Love | 13 | 10 | — | — | Shanachie |
| 1998 | For Your Pleasure | 6 | 6 | — | — | Shanachie |
| 2000 | Won't You Let Me Love You | 4 | 3 | — | 34 | Shanachie |
| 2002 | Rendezvous | 6 | 3 | — | 19 | Shanachie |
| 2003 | Midnight Love | 8 | 4 | — | 38 | Shanachie |
| 2003 | Go with the Flow | 7 | 4 | — | 23 | Affable |
| 2004 | The Classics R & B Collection | 14 | 10 | — | — | Shanachie |
| 2005 | Greatest Hits! | 34 | 23 | — | — | Shanachie |
| 2005 | For Her | 10 | 5 | 88 | — | Heads Up |
| 2006 | Live | — | — | — | — | Shanachie |
| 2007 | Ready for Love | 5 | 2 | — | 34 | Affable |
| 2008 | Sax Meditations | — | — | — | — | Affable |
| 2009 | Free Your Mind | 15 | 5 | — | — | Heads Up |
| 2010 | Backatcha! | 13 | 9 | — | — | Shanachie |
| 2010 | Live – In the Groove | — | — | — | — | Affable |
| 2013 | Live in the Club | — | — | — | — | Affable |
| 2014 | Sax Meditations ll | — | — | — | — | Affable |
| 2015 | I'm Back | — | — | — | — | Affable |
| 2017 | Blackstreams (EP) | 18 | 6 | — | — | Affable |
| 2018 | The Best of Walter Beasley | — | 11 | — | — | Affable |
| 2019 | Going Home | 15 | 7 | — | — | Affable |
| 2021 | Meet Me at My Place | — | — | — | — | Affable |
| 2023 | Do You Want to Dance? | — | — | — | — | Affable |
| 2024 | Live and Blessed | — | — | — | — | Affable |
| 2024 | Tribute To Soul | — | — | — | — | |
| 2025 | Sin Palabras | — | — | — | — | |
| 2026 | 65 Bounce | — | — | — | — | |
"—" denotes a recording that did not chart.

=== Singles ===
| Year | Title | Peak chart positions | | Album |
| Year | Title | Hot R&B/ Hip-Hop Songs | Smooth Jazz Airplay | Album |
|---|---|---|---|---|
| 1987 | "I'm So Happy" | 49 | —N/a | Walter Beasley |
| 1988 | "On the Edge" | 79 | —N/a | Walter Beasley |
| 1989 | "Don't Say Goodbye" | 95 | —N/a | Just Kickin' It |
| 1990 | "Just Kickin' It" | 67 | —N/a | Just Kickin' It |
| 1993 | "If You Ever Loved Someone and Lost" | 63 | —N/a | Intimacy |
| 2005 | "Coolness" | — | 2 | For Her |
| 2007 | "Ready for Love" | — | 1 | Ready for Love |
| 2007 | "Why Not You" | — | 13 | Ready for Love |
| 2009 | "Steady as She Goes" | — | 1 | Free Your Mind |
| 2010 | "Oh Yeah" | — | 3 | Free Your Mind |
| 2011 | "Expressway" | — | 19 | Backatcha! |
| 2011 | "The Call" | — | 20 | Backatcha! |
| 2013 | "Groove in You" (live) | — | 14 | Live in the Club |
| 2014 | "Silver Lining" | — | 21 | Sax Meditations ll |
| 2015 | "I'm Back" | — | 1 | I'm Back |
| 2016 | "Hard Work" (Walter Beasley featuring Michael O'Hara) | — | 17 | I'm Back |
| 2017 | "Don't Say a Word" | — | 8 | Blackstreams |
| 2017 | "Now What" | — | 18 | Blackstreams |
| 2018 | "Come on Over" | — | 15 | Blackstreams |
| 2018 | "Funky Boy" (Byron Miller featuring Walter Beasley) | — | 24 | Byron Miller – Psychobass 2 – The Gift |
| 2018 | "Skip to My Lew" | — | 4 | I'm Back |
| 2019 | "The B-Spot" (Byron Miller featuring Walter Beasley) | — | 2 | Byron Miller – Psychobass 2 – The Gift |
| 2019 | "It's Alright" | — | 3 | Going Home |
| 2020 | "Aqui" | — | 24 | Going Home |
| 2020 | "Real Love" (Bryon Miller featuring Stevie Wonder and Walter Beasley) | — | 22 | Byron Miller – Psychobass 3 – Real Love |
| 2021 | "The Beasley Strut" | — | 16 | Meet Me at My Place |
| 2023 | "Nice and Easy" (Walter Beasley featuring Najee) | — | 2 | Do You Want to Dance? |
| 2024 | "Funk Foot" (Walter Beasley featuring Phil Davis) | — | 3 | Do You Want to Dance? |
| 2025 | "Lazy Afternoon (Kenny's Groove)" | — | 7 | 65 Bounce |
| 2026 | "65 Bounce" | — | 2 | 65 Bounce |
"—" denotes a recording that did not chart.

== DVDs ==
=== Educational ===
- Sound Production for the Saxophone (Affable Publishing, 2003)
- Hip-Hop Improvisation (Affable Publishing, 2003)
- Circular Breathing with Walter Beasley
- 14 Steps to Maximizing Your Performance (for Saxophonists)
- Walter Beasley's Performance Workshop
- Walter Beasley presents Vocal Performance
- Improv Using Pentatonics
- Performance Insight
- Playing Blues
- Resolution Warm-Up
- Using Vibrato
- Improvisations and Delivery Clinic

=== Live ===
- Walter Beasley Live at Scullers (Affable Records, 2003)
- Live in the Club (Walter Beasley, 2013)

== Books ==
- Performance Insight for Musicians
- Nice and Easy Cookbook
- Performance Insight (for Musicians) Vol. II
- Quotes For Grown Folks

== APPs ==
- Walter Beasley Smooth Jazz Alarm App
- Walter Beasley in Concert Transcriptions
- Music Lessons by Walter Beasley
- Hip hop Improvisation
- Walter Beasley Transcriptions
- Circular Breathing
- Sound Production for Saxophone
- Sax Meditations

== Awards and accolades ==
- 2001 Boston Music Awards, Outstanding Jazz Artist
- 2001 Berklee College of Music Trustee Award for advancing the mission and values of the college
- 2001 South Middlesex Men's Club Leadership Award for community service and support of youth development in music.
- 2001 SESAC National Performing Activity Award for the song "Comin' at Cha"
- 2002 SESAC National Performing Activity Award for the song "Rendezvous"
- 2003 Boston Music Awards, Jazz Album of the Year (Go With the Flow)
- 2013 Forever Ink Achievement Award
- 2019 Boston Music Award for Outstanding Jazz Artist
- 2023 Soul Tracks Reader's Choice Award, Instrumentalist for the Year
