= Tim Bowman =

American smooth jazz gospel musician (born 1959)

- Born: Timothy Bowman; April 22, 1959 (age 67); Detroit, Michigan
- Genres: Smooth jazz, gospel, traditional black gospel, urban contemporary gospel
- Occupations: Singer, songwriter, guitarist
- Instruments: Vocals, singer-songwriter, guitar
- Years active: 1996–present
- Labels: INSP, Insync, Diamante, Liquid 8, Trippin 'N' Rhythm
- Website: timbowman.com

Timothy Bowman Sr. (born April 22, 1959) is an American smooth jazz gospel musician. He started his music career, in 1996, with the release of, Love, Joy, Peace, by INSP Media Group (Insync Music) alongside Diamante Records, and they released his first three albums, 1998's Paradise and 2000's Smile. The subsequent album, This Is What I Hear, was released by Liquid 8 Records in 2004. His fifth album, Tim Bowman, released in 2008 by Trippin 'N' Rhythm Records. This album was his breakthrough release upon the Billboard Contemporary Jazz Albums chart.

== Early life ==
Bowman was born on April 22, 1959, as Timothy Bowman in Detroit, Michigan. His older sister is Vickie Winans(who was also a member of International Sounds of Deliverance, a gospel group that he joined after his high school commencement ceremony). His parents were a father who worked in the construction business, Aaron Bowman, and a mother who was a homemaker, Mattie A. Bowman. He started playing the guitar at 11 years old, and he became a member of The Winans, for a short time during the early to mid-1980s, as their guitarist, after getting an invite to play a show at Mercy College in the presence of Andraé Crouch. He would soon get tired of the endless touring schedule, and left the group in 1987.

== Music career ==
His solo music recording career commenced in May 1996, with the album, Love, Joy, Peace, and it was released by INSP Media Group (Insync Music), who originated from Salem, Oregon, alongside Diamante Records, yet they only made 2,000 units to sell in his hometown of Detroit, and in the span of five weeks half of the units were sold. The labels decided to sell the album nationwide that October. He released two more albums with the labels, 1998's Paradise and 2000's Smile. The subsequent album, This Is What I Hear, was released by Liquid 8 Records on August 3, 2004. His fifth album, Tim Bowman, released on September 30, 2008, by Trippin 'N' Rhythm Records. This album was his breakthrough release upon the Billboard Contemporary Jazz Albums chart, and it placed at a peak of No. 15. He has placed four songs on the Smooth Jazz Songs chart over the course of his career.

== Personal life ==
His son, Tim Bowman Jr., is a gospel music artist in his own right.

== Discography ==
=== Albums ===
Year	Title	Peak chart positions		Label
Year	Title	US Jazz	US Con. Jazz	Label
1996	Love, Joy, Peace	—	—	Insync Music
1998	Paradise	—	—	Insync Music
2000	Smile	—	—	Insync Music
2004	This is What I Hear	—	—	Liquid 8 Records
2008	Tim Bowman	28	15	Trippin 'N' Rhythm
2010	Collection – (Compilation)	—	—	Trippin 'N' Rhythm
2017	Into the Blue	5	2	I.M. Records
"—" denotes a recording that did not chart.

=== Singles ===
Year	Title	Peak chart positions			Album
Year	Title	Smooth Jazz Airplay	Hot Gospel Songs	Gospel Airplay	Album
2005	"My Praise"	—	8	8	This is What I Hear
2005	"Summer Groove"	24	—	—	This is What I Hear
2008	"Sweet Sundays"	1	—	—	Tim Bowman
2009	"High Def"	28	—	—	Tim Bowman
2010	"God Rest Ye Merry Gentlemen"	29	—	—	Various Artists – The Very Best of Christmas
2010	"Let It Shine"	4	—	—	Collection
2011	"All My Life"	7	—	—	Collection
2012	"Sunday Vibe" (Ben Tankard featuring Tim Bowman)	14	—	—	Ben Tankard – Full Tank
2013	"Please Don't Say No" (Nicholas Cole featuring Tim Bowman)	8	—	—	Nicholas Cole – Endless Possibilities
2013	"Seaside Drive"	1	—	—	Into the Blue
2017	"City Lights"	10	—	—	Into the Blue
2017	"Boss"	4	—	—	Into the Blue
2019	"Into the Blue"	21	—	—	Into the Blue
2020	"Just a Taste" (Marcus Anderson featuring Tim Bowman)	5	—	—	Marcus Anderson – HERO
2021	"Fireball"	1	—	—	Non-album single
2022	"Movin' N Groovin" (Tim Bowman featuring Michael Broening)	4	—	—	Non-album single
2023	"Easy"	1	—	—	Non-album single
2024	"Ocean Breeze"	1	—	—	Non-album single
2025	"I Want to Be with You"	2	—	—	Non-album single
2025	"One of a Kind" (Embassy featuring Tim Bowman)	19	—	—	Non-album single
"—" denotes a recording that did not chart.
