= Jackiem Joyner =

American jazz musician

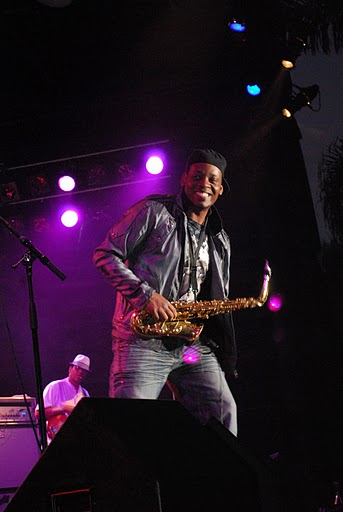

Background information
- Born: Jackiem Charvez Joyner; February 9, 1980 (age 46); Norfolk, Virginia, U.S.
- Genres: Smooth jazz
- Occupation: Musician
- Instruments: Saxophone, flute
- Label: Mack Avenue
- Website: www.jackiemjoyner.com

Jackiem Joyner (born February 9, 1980) is a smooth jazz saxophonist and flutist from Norfolk, Virginia, US.

== Biography ==
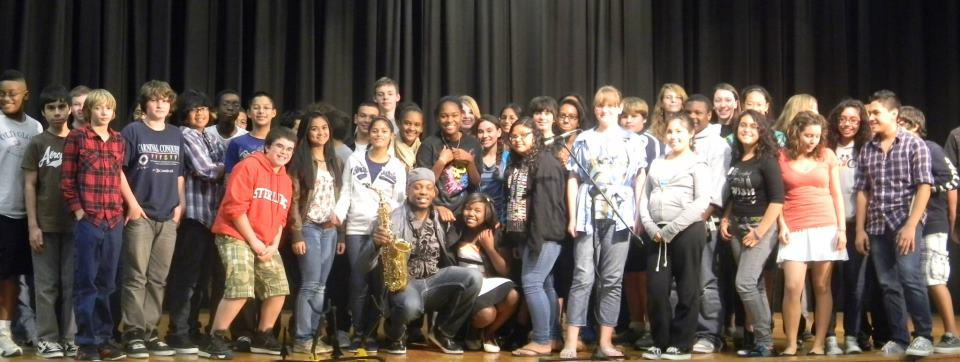
Jackiem Joyner Musicians Clinic, Sterling Middle School, Virginia.

Son of Dianne Joyner Terry and Jackie Smith (local bass guitar player known as the raven). Raised by his mother in a single parent home. Family of six, three brothers and one sister. The family moved from Norfolk, Virginia, to Syracuse, New York, when Joyner was a teenager. He began playing saxophone while attending Fowler High School under the leadership of his music teacher and mentor Lou Adams. He competed in the NAACP's youth achievement program "ACT-SO" (geared towards African Americans demonstrating academic, artistic and scientific prowess and expertise) representing the city of Syracuse and won the state competition three years in a row in three different categories: instrumental contemporary, composition, and classical music. After high school, he moved back to Virginia, where Bishop Michael Patterson of the World Harvest Outreach Ministries in Newport News made him music director. Joyner played for audiences in Nigeria, Sudan, and Kenya on a missionary trip in 2002.

When he was twenty-one, Joyner played saxophone for keyboardist Marcus Johnson from 2001 to 2004. He played the national anthem at a professional basketball game in Washington, D.C. At the Bermuda Jazz Festival, R&B singer Angela Bofill invited him on tour with Jean Carne and Ronnie Laws. He has been the opening act for India.Arie, George Duke, Najee, and Phil Perry and has toured with Keiko Matsui.

Joyner independently released his debut album, This Time Around (2005), then signed with Artizen Music Group, which released his second album, Babysoul (2007). The single "Stay With Me tonight" featured guitarist Peter White and reached No. 17 on the Billboard magazine Contemporary Jazz Chart.

He recorded for Mack Avenue after it bought Artizen. The single "I'm Waiting for You" was a No.1 hit on the Billboard Contemporary Jazz chart. It was nominated Song of the Year in 2010 at the American Smooth Jazz Awards. His single "Take Me There" was also a No. 1 hit on the same chart.

In 2010, he was given Keys to the City by Mayor Stephanie Miner of Syracuse for Outstanding Achievement in Music along with a proclamation of August 5, 2010 as Jackiem Joyner Day.

== Awards and honors ==
- 2008 Debut Artist of the Year, Smooth Jazz News
- 2009 Nomination, Song of the Year, American Smooth Jazz Awards
- 2010 Keys to the city and Jackiem Joyner Day, by Mayor Stephanie Minor of Syracuse, New York

== Discography ==
=== Studio albums ===
year	title	label	notes
2007	BabySoul	Artizen	including Peter White, Rick Braun
2009	Lil Man Soul	Mack Avenue/Artistry	
2010	Jackiem Joyner	Mack Avenue/Artistry	including Paul Jackson Jr.
2012	Church Boy	Mack Avenue/Artistry	including Kirk Whalum, Jonathan Butler
2014	Evolve	Mack Avenue/Artistry	
2017	Main Street Beat	Mack Avenue/Artistry	
2019	Touch	Joyner Media Company	
2023	Missing You	Joyner Media Company	

=== EP albums ===
year	title	label	notes
2020	Journey of Passion	CDBaby	

=== As guest ===
year	title	label	notes
2004	Straight and Smooth		by Bobby Lyle
2005	Lessons in Love		by Marcus Johnson
2005	Smooth Jazz Christmas		by Marcus Johnson
2010	The Road		by Keiko Matsui
