= Paul Taylor (saxophonist) =

American smooth jazz saxophonist

- Born: April 30, 1960 (age 66)
- Origin: Denver, Colorado, United States
- Genres: Smooth jazz
- Occupation: Saxophonist
- Instruments: alto and soprano saxophone, vocals
- Years active: 1995–present
- Website: www.paultaylorsax.com

Paul Taylor (born April 30, 1960) is an American smooth jazz alto and soprano saxophonist and singer who has released twelve albums since his debut On the Horn in 1995. He is a graduate of University of Nevada, Las Vegas (UNLV), where he attended with a full music scholarship. He is signed to Peak Records. Although originally from Denver, Colorado, he is based in Las Vegas, Nevada. He has worked extensively with Keiko Matsui and played as a special guest with the Rippingtons for a short time in 1999 and 2000, after Jeff Kashiwa left the group and before Eric Marienthal joined them.

He collaborated with many R&B vocalists such as LaToya London, Regina Belle, Maxi Priest, Peabo Bryson and Terry Dexter.

== Discography ==
=== Studio albums ===
Year	Title	Peak chart positions			Record label
Year	Title	US Jazz	US R&B	US IND	Record label
1995	On The Horn	23	—	—	Countdown Records
1997	Pleasure Seeker	11	—	—	Countdown Records
2000	Undercover	6	—	27	N-Coded Music/N2K Records
2001	Hypnotic	12	—	—	Peak Records
2003	Steppin Out	11	—	40	Peak Records
2005	Nightlife	5	—	—	Peak Records
2007	Ladies' Choice	5	26	—	Peak Records
2009	Burnin	7	—	—	Concord/Peak Records
2011	Prime Time	7	—	—	E-One
2014	Tenacity	6	—	—	E-One
2016	Countdown	9	—	—	E-One/Peak Records
2021	And Now This				Peak Records
