= Peter White (musician) =

English jazz musician and composer

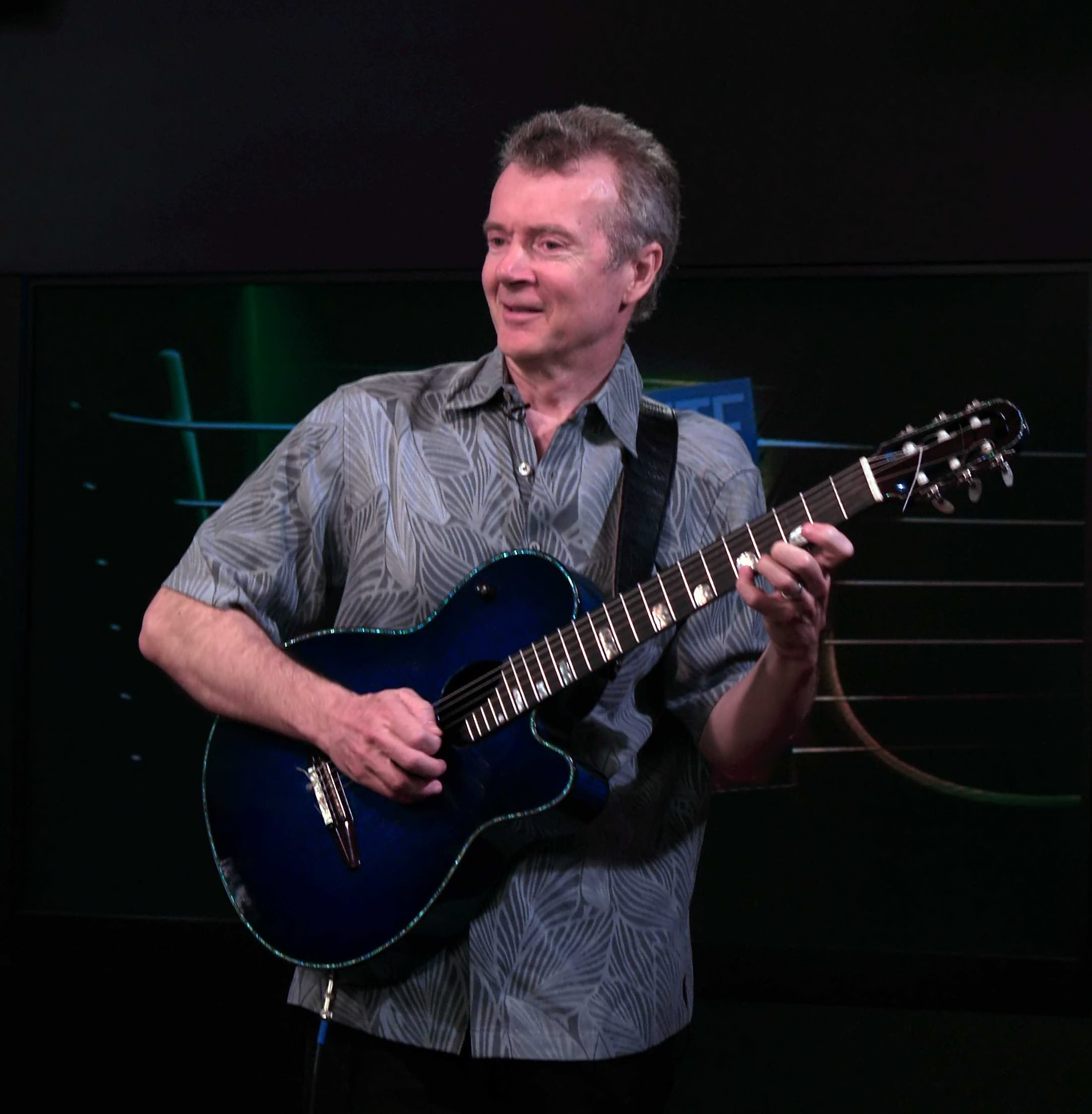
- Peter White, San Diego, 2009

Background information
- Born: 20 September 1954 (age 71); Luton, England
- Genres: Smooth jazz
- Occupation: Musician
- Instruments: Guitar, accordion, piano, harmonica
- Labels: Columbia, ARTizen, Peak, Heads Up
- Formerly of: Shot in the Dark
- Website: www.peterwhite.com

Peter White (born 20 September 1954) is an English musician and composer who plays guitar, piano, accordion and harmonica. He is known for his 20-year collaboration with Al Stewart.

== Musical career ==
=== Early career with Al Stewart ===
Born in Luton, England White first gained fame with his distinctive guitar style as accompanist to singer/songwriter Al Stewart. He started in Stewart's band in 1975 at the age of 20, then moved to Los Angeles in 1978. During a 20-year tenure with Stewart, he co-wrote many songs, including Stewart's 1978 top-ten hit "Time Passages" and “Midnight Rocks” (which reached No. 24 on the US charts) in 1980. That same year he formed Shot In The Dark, a band which backed Stewart and released an eponymous album in 1981.

=== Basia ===
In 1984, White’s brother Danny White, one of the founders of Matt Bianco, invited him to play on the Matt Bianco debut album Whose Side Are You On?. He played acoustic guitar (uncredited) on the song "Half A Minute"--the first time that the two brothers collaborated musically. In 1987 White continued his association with Matt Bianco's singer, Basia Trzetrzelewska, by playing guitar on her Time and Tide album, co-produced by his brother. He played on all of Basia’s following studio albums and joined her on two world tours, in 1990 and 1994. In 1996 Basia returned the favor by singing on White's album Caravan of Dreams, on the single "Just Another Day".

=== Producing and solo work ===
In 1989 White co-produced the album “The Clock and the Moon” by singer Skipper Wise. In return Wise co-produced White’s first two solo albums, Reveillez-Vous in 1990 and Excusez-Moi in 1992. Many other solo albums by Peter White followed which resulted in several songs reaching the top of the Billboard Smooth Jazz Songs chart. No. 1 hits include "Midnight in Manhattan", featuring Grover Washington, Jr. (1998), "What Does It Take (To Win Your Love)" featuring Sam Riney (2006), "Mister Magic" featuring Bob James (2007), "Bright" (2009), "Good Day (2010), "Here We Go" featuring Dave Sanborn (2012), "Head Over Heels" featuring Rick Braun (2014), and "Do I Do" (2017).

White’s first full-length show as a solo artist took place at the 1991 Catalina Island JazzTrax Festival, which featured many other notable performers such as Grover Washington Jr., Dave Koz, Bobby Caldwell, and Acoustic Alchemy.

Even after releasing three solo CDs, White continued to work with Al Stewart and Basia, eventually co-producing Stewart’s Famous Last Words CD in 1993. As a solo artist White has recorded and performed with many other instrumental artists including Boney James, Rick Braun, Richard Elliot, Grover Washington Jr., Gerald Albright, Dave Koz, and Brian Culbertson.

== Discography ==
=== Albums ===
Year	Title	US Jazz	US Con. Jazz	Label
1990	Réveillez-Vous			Chase Music
1991	Excusez-Moi		14	Sindrome
1993	Promenade	36	8	Sindrome
1994	Reflections	16	13	Sindrome
1996	Caravan of Dreams	4	5	Columbia
1997	Songs of the Season	13	9	Columbia
1998	Perfect Moment	3	3	Columbia
2001	Glow	4	2	Columbia
2004	Confidential	3	2	Columbia
2006	Playin' Favourites	4	2	Columbia
2007	Peter White Christmas	12	5	ARTizen
2009	Good Day	2	2	Peak
2013	Here We Go	3	1	Heads Up
2014	Smile	3	1	Heads Up
2016	Groovin'	2	1	Heads Up
2019	Music for STARLUX Airlines	14	3	Lobster Music
2025	Light of Day			A-Train/Lobster

=== Singles ===
Year	Title	US Jazz	Label
2006	"What Does It Take (To Win Your Love)"	1	Columbia
2007	"Mister Magic"	1	ARTizen
2009	"The Little Drummer Boy" (with Rick Braun and Mindi Abair)	28	Peak
2009	"Bright"	1	Peak
2010	"Good Day"	7	Peak
2012	"Here We Go"	1	Heads Up
2013	"Night after Night"	14	Heads Up
2014	"Head Over Heels"	1	Heads Up
2015	"Smile"	5	Heads Up
2017	"Do I Do"	1	Heads Up
2017	"We Don't Talk Anymore" (Rick Braun featuring Peter White)	3	Heads Up
2017	"Groovin'"	15	Heads Up
2019	"Last Dance" (Jackiem Joyner featuring Peter White)	15	Lobster Music
2020	"Flying High"	17	Lobster Music
2022	"After We Play" (Johnny Britt featuring Peter White)	2	J-Jams
2024	"Sunshine Yellow" (Carol Albert featuring Peter White)	1	Cahara
2025	"Catalonia"	2	A-Train/Lobster
2025	"Ventura Highway" (Dw3 featuring Peter White)	20	Woodward Avenue
2026	"Dancing in the Sand" (Steve Oliver featuring Peter White)	3	TBA

== Awards ==
Peter White won the award for best Smooth Jazz Musician in the 2007 Canadian Smooth Jazz Awards. He was named the Best Guitarist at the National Smooth Jazz Awards for four consecutive years from 2000–2003.

In 2000, White won three Oasis Contemporary Jazz Awards:

- CD of the Year for Perfect Moment
- Song of the Year for "Midnight in Manhattan" with Grover Washington, Jr.
- Best Guitarist
