= Rick Braun =

American jazz musician and composer

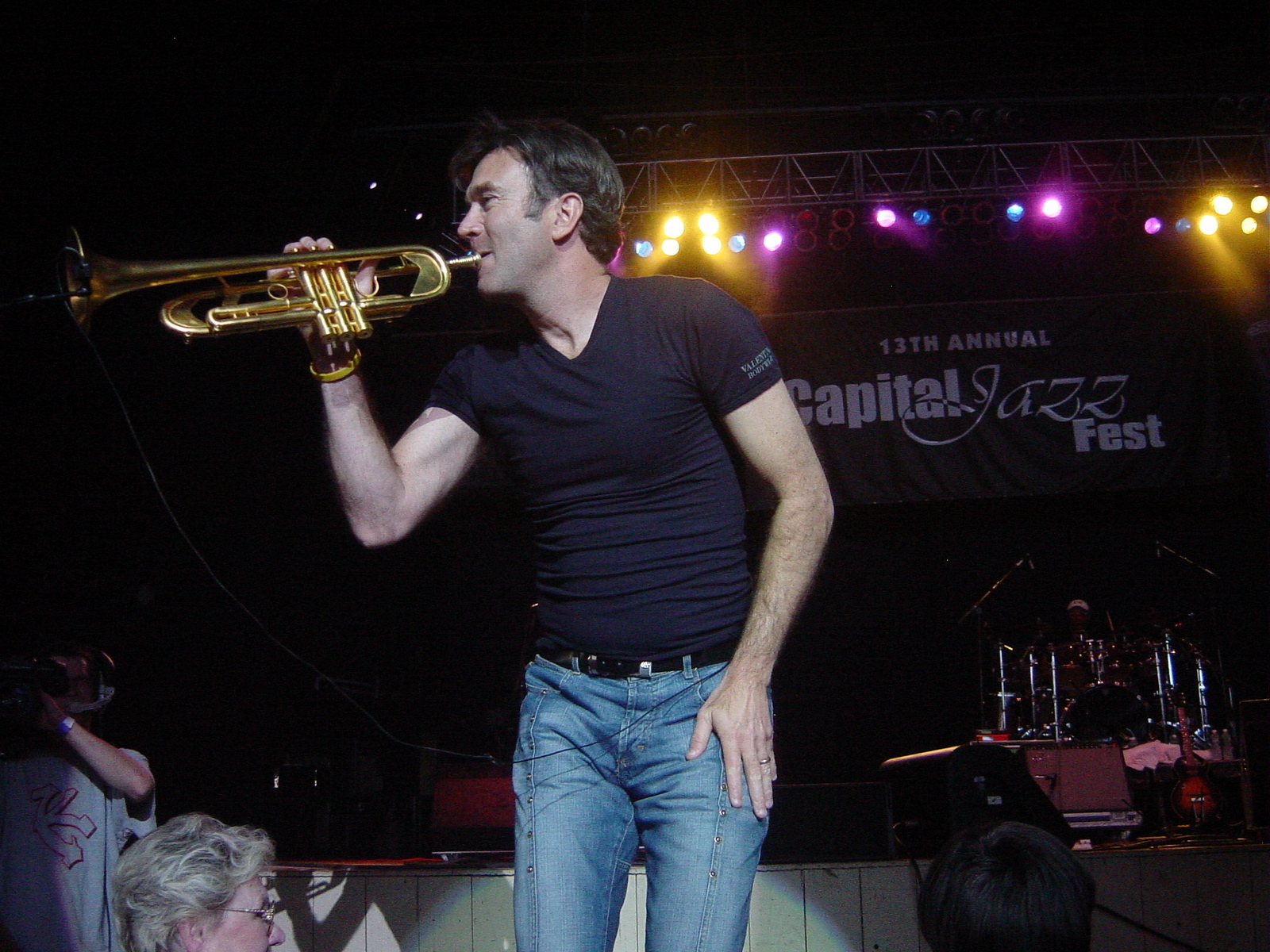
- Braun performing in 2005

Background information
- Birth name: Richard Carl Braun
- Born: July 6, 1955 (age 70); Allentown, Pennsylvania, U.S.
- Genres: Smooth jazz, jazz fusion, pop
- Occupation(s): Musician, record producer
- Instruments: Trumpet, flugelhorn, keyboards
- Labels: Artistry, Mack Avenue
- Website: rickbraun.com

Rick Braun (born July 6, 1955) is an American smooth jazz trumpet, flugelhorn, trombone and keyboards player, vocalist, composer, and record producer.

== Early life and education ==
Braun was born in Allentown, Pennsylvania, on July 6, 1955. He attended Dieruff High School in Allentown. His mother was a self-taught pianist and banjoist. Braun played drums at Dieruff High School, and followed his brother in playing trumpet.

In the 1970s, while attending the Eastman School of Music in Rochester, New York, he became a member of a jazz-fusion band, Auracle, along with, amongst others, keyboards player John Serry, saxophone and flute player Steve Kujala and vibes player Steve Rehbein (later Steve Raybine). The band worked with producer Teo Macero and Braun co-produced the second album City Slickers (minus John Serry and Steve Kujala).

== Career ==
In the 1980s, Braun entered the pop music world, releasing an album in Japan as a singer. He then worked as a songwriter for Lorimar, writing the song "Here with Me" with REO Speedwagon which became a top twenty hit, and the theme for Lorimar's NBC show Midnight Caller. When he returned to the trumpet, he worked as a studio musician and touring member with Crowded House, Natalie Cole, Glenn Frey, Jack Mack and the Heart Attack, Tom Petty, Sade, Rod Stewart, Tina Turner, and War.

In 1992, he released his debut solo album, Intimate Secrets (Mesa), followed in 1994 by two solo albums, Night Walk and Christmas Present. The former featured him playing just muted trumpet and flugelhorn. His popularity increased enough by 1995, when he released Beat Street, that he was persuaded to pursue a solo career.

He has cited as influences Miles Davis, Lee Morgan, Chet Baker, Clark Terry, Dizzy Gillespie, and Herb Alpert. He cites Herb Alpert with inspiring his album All It Takes, which includes the song "Tijuana Dance", a play on Alpert's band Tijuana Brass. One of his influences was Freddie Hubbard, and Braun composed a song, "Freddie Was Here" in 2008, which he recorded on his album, All it Takes, in tribute to Hubbard, who died that year.

He achieved several top chartings including Kisses in the Rain (as high as number 1), R n R (as high as number 1), All It Takes (as high as number 2), and Can You Feel It (as high as number 1) along with charting at the Traditional Jazz Albums for the first time in 2011 with the vocal album Sings with Strings (as high as number 9).

Braun performs in the band BWB, with saxophonist Kirk Whalum and guitarist Norman Brown. He has performed live with known musicians such as Candy Dulfer, Dave Koz, Jackiem Joyner, and Peter White.

In 2005, he and saxophonist Richard Elliot co-founded ARTizen Music Group, now known as Artistry Music, and once had Rykodisc as a distributor.

Braun has twice been named Gavin Report's "Artist of the Year".

== Discography ==
=== Albums ===
Titles	Year	Label	Notes
Intimate Secrets	1992	Mesa	
Night Walk	1994	Mesa/Bluemoon	
Christmas Present: Music of Warmth and Celebration	1994	Mesa/Bluemoon	reissued by Atlantic in 1997
Beat Street	1995	Mesa/Bluemoon	
Body and Soul	1997	Mesa/Bluemoon	
Full Stride	1998	Atlantic	
Shake It Up	2000	Warner Bros.	with Boney James
Kisses in the Rain	2001	Warner Bros.	
Esperanto	2003	Warner Bros.	
Yours Truly	2005	Artizen	
Sessions: Volume 1	2006	Artizen	
R n R	2007	Artizen	with Richard Elliot
All It Takes	2009	Artistry/Mack Avenue	
Sings with Strings	2011	Artistry/Mack Avenue	
Swingin' in the Snow	2012	Brauntosoarus/CD Baby	
Can You Feel It	2014	Artistry/Mack Avenue	
Around the Horn	2017	Shanachie	
Crossroads	2019	Shanachie	
Rick Braun	2022	Brauntosoarus	

=== BWB (Rick Braun, Kirk Whalum, Norman Brown) ===
Titles	Year	Label
Groovin'	2002	Warner Bros.
Human Nature: The Songs of Michael Jackson	2013	Heads Up
BWB	2016	Artistry/Mack Avenue

=== Compilation appearances ===
- New Age Music & New Sounds Vol. 67 – Liberty

=== Songs co-written ===
- "Here With Me" (with Kevin Cronin)
