= Euge Groove =

American smooth jazz saxophonist

- Birth name: Steven Eugene Grove
- Also known as: Euge Groove
- Born: November 27, 1962 (age 62); Hagerstown, Maryland, United States
- Genres: Smooth jazz
- Years active: 1980s–present
- Website: www.eugegroove.com

Steven Eugene Grove (born November 27, 1962), better known as Euge Groove, is an American smooth jazz saxophonist.

== Early life and career ==
Born in Hagerstown, Maryland, he graduated from the University of Miami School of Music in 1984. Grove did not record his first solo album until 2000. Prior to that, he had replaced Richard Elliot in the Tower of Power when Elliot decided to pursue a solo career; he also did session work with various pop acts, most noticeably the Miami girl group Exposé. He has a sax solo on their No. 1 hit "Seasons Change," and another on their 1993 hit "I'll Never Get Over You (Getting Over Me)."

Grove adopted the name Euge Groove; initially presumed to be coined by fans who saw him perform in Europe, Grove later indicated in an interview on XM Radio in 2006 that his mother-in-law conceived the idea for his stage name.

Euge Groove's best-known solo hits include "Sneak a Peek," "Slam Dunk," "Rewind," "Don't Let Me Be Lonely Tonight," "Livin' Large" and "XXL." His most recent hits include "Get 'Em Going", "Chillaxin', and "S7ven Large". Albums include: “S7ven Large” (2011), “Born 2 Groove” (2006), “Livin' Large” (2004), “Play Date” (2002) and “Sunday Morning” (2009). In 2008 he went on tour with Tina Turner.
