= Richard Elliot =

Scottish saxophonist (born 1960)

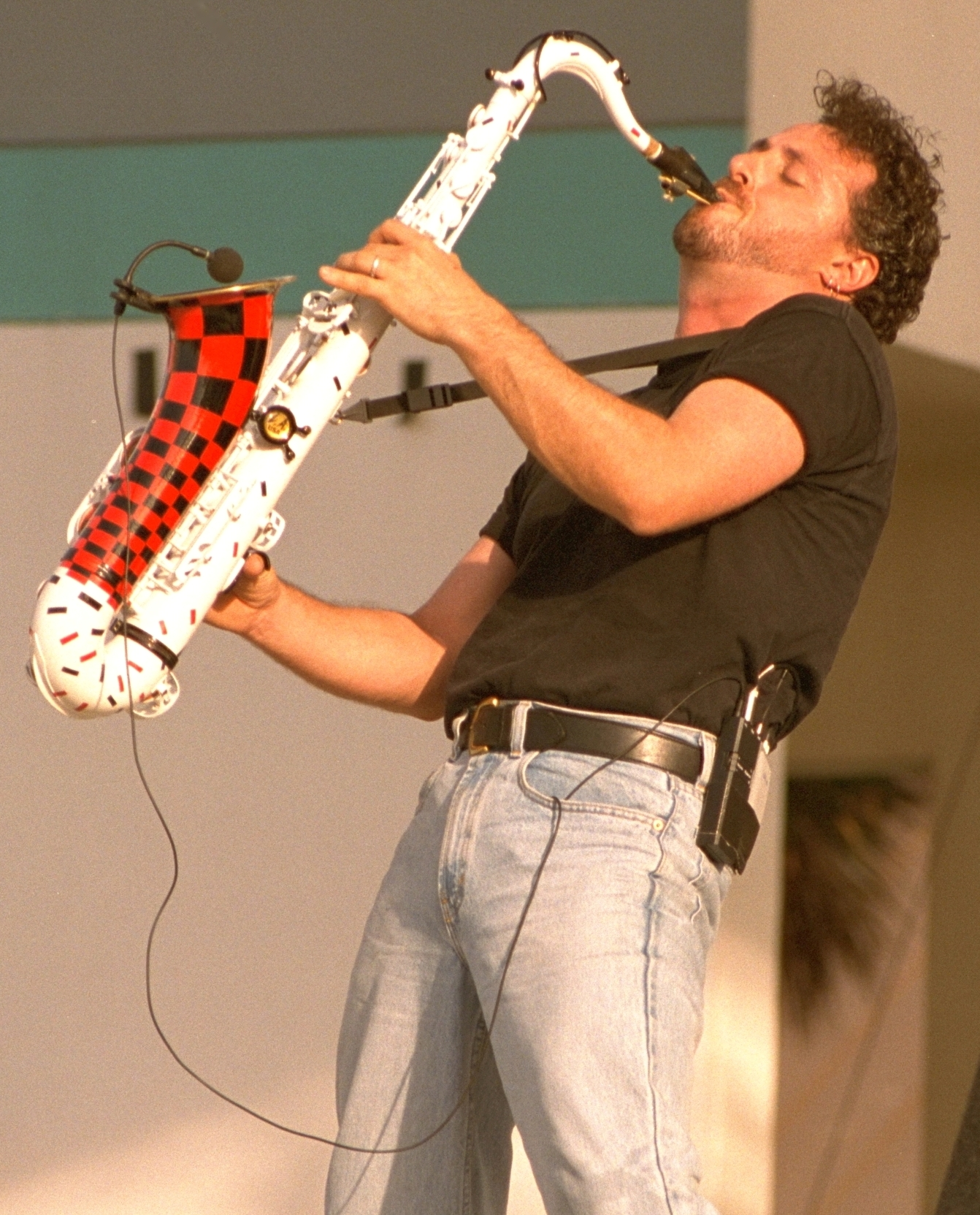
- Richard Elliot performing in 2005

Background information
- Born: Richard Joel Elliot; January 16, 1960 (age 66); Glasgow, Scotland
- Origin: Los Angeles, California
- Genre: Jazz
- Occupation: Saxophonist
- Instruments: Tenor saxophone; lyricon; alto saxophone; soprano saxophone
- Years active: 1977–present
- Formerly of: Tower of Power
- Website: richardelliot.com

Richard Elliot (born January 16, 1960) is a Scottish saxophonist. He was nominated for a Grammy Award for Best Pop Instrumental Album at the 56th Annual Grammy Awards for Summer Horns.

== Biography ==
=== Early life ===
Elliot was born in Glasgow, Scotland, but moved to Los Angeles, California with his family at the age of three. There, he became smitten with the R&B sound, particularly that of Motown.

=== Career ===
Elliot started out as a member of the jazz-rock unit, KittyHawk, playing lyricon (a wind synthesizer) and saxophone, and recording several albums with them. He then became a member of the funk band Tower of Power, playing tenor sax for five years during the 1980s. He also did a stint as a member of the Yellowjackets. He also worked on Stacy Lattisaw's 1986 album Take Me All the Way. His solo career took off when he remade the Percy Sledge classic "When a Man Loves a Woman", which had also been remade by Michael Bolton. Other well-known songs include "In the Groove", "Take Your Time", "Crush", "Chill Factor", "Corner Pocket" and "Sly", as well as remakes of classic pop songs such as "I'm Not in Love" and the Luther Vandross hits "Here and Now" and "Your Secret Love".

Elliot participated with fellow saxophonists Paul Taylor and Gerald Albright, as well as keyboardist Jeff Lorber, in the "Grooving for Grover" concert series. The series honored the legacy of the late Grover Washington Jr.

Elliot was known for his zebra-striped tenor saxophone. In 2011, he switched from LA SAX Saxes to Dakota Saxophones, which the owner, Peter LaPlaca, sold for Dakota.

In 2005, Elliot joined trumpeter Rick Braun to co-found their own label, ARTizen Music Group (now known as Artistry Music). Among the first albums on that label is Elliot's own Metro Blue.

Elliot played the lyricon on several songs on the album Mirage a Trois (1983) by the Yellowjackets.

== Discography ==
- Initial Approach (ITI, 1984)
- Trolltown (Intima, 1986)
- The Power of Suggestion (Intima, 1988)
- Take to the Skies (Intima, 1989)
- What's Inside (Enigma, 1990)
- On the Town (Manhattan, 1991)
- Soul Embrace (Capitol/Manhattan, 1993)
- After Dark (Blue Note, 1994)
- City Speak (Blue Note, 1996)
- Jumpin' Off (Metro Blue, 1997)
- Chill Factor (Capitol/Blue Note, 1999)
- Ballads (Blue Note, 2001)
- Crush (Verve/GRP, 2001)
- Ricochet (GRP, 2003)
- Metro Blue (Artizen, 2005)
- R n R (featuring Rick Braun) (Artizen, 2007)
- Rock Steady (Artistry Music, 2009)
- In the Zone (Artistry Music, 2011)
- Lip Service (Heads Up, 2014)
- Summer Madness (Hear Music, 2016)
- Authentic Life (Shanachie, 2021)
- Straight Up Down (Shanachie, 2024)

== Awards and nominations ==
Year	Nominee / work	Award	Result	Ref.
2013	Summer Horns	Grammy Award for Best Pop Instrumental Album	Nominated	
