= Craig Bauer =

American mixing engineer

- Occupations: Mix engineer, producer, songwriter, artist
- Instruments: keyboards; guitars
- Website: www.craigbauer.com

Craig Bauer is an American Grammy Award winning mixing engineer and record producer. He has been nominated for two Album of the Year Grammy Awards for his work on Kanye West's multiplatinum album Late Registration and double platinum follow-up Graduation. He won a Grammy Award in 2008 for mixing the Clark Sisters' 2007 album, Live – One Last Time.

Bauer has worked with other high-profile artists across multiple genres, including Lupe Fiasco, Justin Timberlake, Ed Sheeran, the Clark Sisters, Janet Jackson, Rihanna, Common, Jennifer Hudson, Lil' Kim, Wu-Tang Clan, Richard Marx, 98°, Yolanda Adams, Dave Koz, Dennis DeYoung, Styx, Donald Lawrence, Destiny's Child, Public Enemy, Hezekiah Walker, and the Smashing Pumpkins.

He also mixed the Saturday Night Live Digital Short "Motherlover" featuring Justin Timberlake and Andy Samberg.

== Life and career ==
Craig Bauer was born and raised in Cleveland, Ohio, where he worked through the ranks of the studios there before migrating to Chicago, Illinois in the early 1990s to open his own recording studio. Bauer additionally studied classical piano and music education at Ohio State University.

In 1993, Bauer opened Hinge Studios in Chicago, Illinois. Many of his first clients were jazz artists, including, Dave Koz, Brian Culbertson, Steve Cole and Peter White.

By 1997, Bauer began working with a young rap group dubbed "the Go Getters", which included a 20 year-old Kanye West. Several of the demos that West recorded at Hinge Studios were built into tracks on the album The College Dropout. Bauer later mixed "Heard 'Em Say", "Roses", "Bring Me Down", "Addiction" and "Late" on West's Late Registration, which was nominated for Album of the Year at the 48th Annual Grammy Awards. He also mixed on West’s follow-up album Graduation, which was nominated again for Album of the Year at the 50th Annual Grammy Awards.

Craig Bauer mixed Lupe Fiasco's debut studio album Lupe Fiasco's Food & Liquor in 2006, which received four Grammy Award nominations at the 49th Grammy Awards, including Best Rap Album. In 2007, he mixed the majority of Fiasco's second album, Lupe Fiasco's The Cool, including the single "Superstar", which peaked at #10 on the Billboard Hot 100. The Cool was nominated in four categories at the 51st Grammy Awards.

In 2008, Bauer won his first Grammy for mixing the Clark Sisters album Live – One Last Time at the 50th Annual Grammy Awards.

== Hinge Studios ==
Opened by Bauer in 1993, Hinge Studios was a recording and mixing facility located in Chicago, Illinois. Hinge was one of the first studios to use the Euphonix CS2000 digitally-controlled recording console.

In 2014, Hinge relocated to Los Angeles, California, where the studio was temporarily operating at Devonshire Studios in North Hollywood. Hinge is now permanently located in Los Angeles.

Hinge Studios Chicago was once dubbed "Kanye West's fortress of solitude in the late '90s" by MTVNews.

== Selected discography ==
- 2019: Soleil Moon, Warrior — Mixing
- 2019: Michael Thompson Band, Love & Beyond — Mixing
- 2019: Donald Lawrence & the Tri-City Singers feat. Le'Andria Johnson, "Deliver Me" — Mixing
- 2019: Donald Lawrence & The Tri-City Singers, YHWH — Mixing
- 2019: Anita Wilson, Here's To Life — Mixing
- 2018: Halo Circus, Robots and Wranglers — Mixing
- 2018: The Nghbrs, All or Nothing — Mixing
- 2018: B Howard, Nite and Day 3.0 — Mixing
- 2018: Bill Champlin, Bleeding Secrets — Mixing
- 2017: Ted Winn, Stand in Awe — Mixing
- 2017: Anita Wilson, Sunday Song — Mixing
- 2016: Hezekiah Walker, Azusa: The Next Generation 2: Better – Mixing
- 2016: B. Reith, Heart on My Sleeve — Mixing
- 2015: Justin Young, Burn Me Down — Mixing
- 2015: Genevieve, Take Me Down — Mixing
- 2015: Karen Clark Sheard, Destined to Win — Mixing
- 2015: James Maslow, "Lies" — Mixing
- 2015: B Howard, Don't Say You Love Me — Mixing
- 2014: Anita Wilson, Vintage Worship — Mixing
- 2014: Common, Nobody's Smiling — Vocal Engineer
- 2014: Cozi Zuehlsdorff, Originals — Mixing
- 2014: Cowboy Troy, King of Clubs — Mixing
- 2013: Donald Lawrence, 20 Years Celebration, Vol. 1: Best for Last – Mixing
- 2013: Hezekiah Walker, Azusa: The Next Generation – Mixing
- 2013: Michael Thompson, Future Past – Mixing
- 2012: Anita Wilson, Worship Soul — Mixing
- 2012: Bishop Paul S. Morton, Sr., Best Days Yet – Mixing
- 2012: Soleil Moon, On the Way to Everything – Guitar (Acoustic), Keyboards, Mixing, Producer, Programming, Tracking
- 2011: Nick Carter, I'm Taking Off – Mixing
- 2011: Ashlyne Huff, Let It Out — Mixing
- 2011: Steve Cole, Moonlight – Engineer, Mixing
- 2011: Donald Lawrence, YRM — Mixing
- 2010: Stan Walker, From the Inside Out – Mixing
- 2009: Stan Walker, Introducing Stan Walker – Mixing
- 2009: Vanessa Bell Armstrong, The Experience – Mixing
- 2009: Donald Lawrence, The Law of Confession, Part I – Mixing
- 2008: Brian Culbertson, Christmas & Hits Duos – Engineer
- 2008: Donald Lawrence, Matthew 28: The Greatest Hits – Mixing
- 2008: Hezekiah Walker, Souled Out – Mixing
- 2008: (Various Artists), Total Club Hits – Mixing
- 2007: Yung Berg, Almost Famous EP – Mixing
- 2007: The Clark Sisters, Live – One Last Time – Mixing
- 2007: Dave Koz, Memories of a Winter's Night – Mixing
- 2007: Kurt Elling, Nightmoves – Engineer, Mixing
- 2007: Dennis DeYoung, One Hundred Years from Now – Engineer, Mixing
- 2007: Yung Berg, "Sexy Lady" – Mixing
- 2007: Lupe Fiasco, Lupe Fiasco's The Cool – Mixing
- 2006: Brian Culbertson, A Soulful Christmas – Engineerk
- 2006: Donald Lawrence, Finalé: Act One – Mixing
- 2006: Lupe Fiasco, Lupe Fiasco's Food & Liquor – Mixing
- 2006: Dave Hollister, The Book of David, Vol 1: The Transition — Engineer
- 2006: Hezekiah Walker & the Love Fellowship Crusade Choir, 20/85 the Experience – Mixing
- 2005: Ludacris, Disturbing tha Peace – Mixing
- 2005: Kanye West, Late Registration – Mixing
- 2005: Public Enemy, New Whirl Odor – Engineering
- 2004: LaShell Griffin, Free – Arranger, Engineer, Guitar (Acoustic), Mixing, Organ (Hammond), Producer, Pro-Tools, Vocal Engineer, Vocal Producer.
- 2004: Donald Lawrence, I Speak Life – Audio Engineer, Engineer, Mixing
- 2004: The O'Jays, Imagination – Mixing
- 2004: Dennis DeYoung, Music of Styx: Live with the Symphony Orchestra – Mixing
- 2004: Various Artists, Oprah's Popstar Challenge – Digital Editing, Engineer, Mixing, Producer
- 2003: Brian Culbertson, Come On Up – Background Noise, Digital Editing, Engineer, Mixing, Performer, Pro-Tools
- 2003: Donald Lawrence, The Best of Donald Lawrence & the Tri-City Singers: Restoring the Years – Engineer, Mixing
- 2001: Brian Culbertson, Nice & Slow – Engineer, Mixing
- 2000: Richard Marx, Days in Avalon – Mixing
- 2000: Da Brat, Unrestricted – Engineer
- 1999: Styx, Brave New World – Engineer, Mixing
- 1998: Yolanda Adams, Songs from the Heart – Engineer
- 1997: 98°, 98° – Engineer
- 1997: Richard Marx, Flesh and Bone – Engineer
- 1996: CeCe Peniston, I'm Movin' On – Mixing
