= Stay Awhile (Steve Cole album) =

Studio album by Steve Cole
- Released: May 1, 1998
- Genre: Jazz
- Length: 44:27
- Label: Atlantic
- Producer: Brian Culbertson

Steve Cole chronology
Stay Awhile (1998)	Between Us (2000)

Professional ratings
Review scores
Source	Rating
Allmusic	1/5 stars

Stay Awhile is a 1998 album by jazz musician Steve Cole, which is his first studio album. It features two number one hits in When I Think of You and Say It Again, and the number five hit Where The Night Begins. Because of this album, Cole also won the Prism Award for Best New Artist at the 2000 Oasis Smooth Jazz Awards. The album also peaked at number 13 on Billboard's Top Contemporary Jazz Albums list.

== Track listing ==
1. "It's Gonna Be Alright" – 4:02
2. "Say It Again" – 3:57
3. "Stay Awhile" – 4:41
4. "When I Think of You" – 4:08
5. "Think About It" – 4:22
6. "Interlude" – 1:46
7. "Where the Night Begins" – 4:37
8. "Intimacy" – 5:37
9. "Intro - Our Love" – 0:31
10. "Our Love" – 3:16
11. "Devotion" - 7:30

== Personnel ==
- Steve Cole - soprano, alto, & tenor saxophones, background vocals.
- Brian Culbertson - piano, keyboards, Hammond B3, synthesizer, drum programming, background vocals.
- Laura Finckle - alto flute.
- Paul Jackson Jr. - guitar.
- Gerey Johnson - guitar.
- Tim Morey - guitar.
- Richard Patterson - bass.
- Oscar Seaton, Jr. - drums.
- Lenny Castro - percussion, background vocals.
- Todd Sucherman - hi-hat, cymbals.
- Josie Aiello - background vocals.
- Phillip Ingram - background vocals.
- Steve Grissette - background vocals.
- George Nauful - background vocals.
- Nanette Frank - background vocals.
