= Come On Up =

Studio album by Brian Culbertson
- Released: June 24, 2003
- Studio: BCM Studios (Los Angeles, California); Megatrax Studio (North Hollywood, California); Hinge Studios (Chicago, Illinois)
- Genre: Jazz
- Length: 44:48
- Label: Warner
- Producer: Brian Culbertson; Stephen Lu

Brian Culbertson chronology
Nice & Slow (2001)	Come On Up (2003)	It's On Tonight (2005)

Professional ratings
Review scores
Source	Rating
AllMusic	3/5 stars
Jazz Times	(favourable)

Come On Up is a studio album by American jazz musician Brian Culbertson. It was released by June 24, 2003 on Warner Records. Artists such as Rick Braun, Rashaan Patterson, Marcus Miller and Norman Brown appeared on the album. Come On Up reached number three on both the US Billboard Contemporary Jazz Albums chart and the Billboard Top Jazz Albums chart.

== Track listing ==
No.	Title	Writer(s)	Length
1.	"Intro"		0:47
2.	"Say What"	Brian Culbertson; Steve Cole	4:55
3.	"Midnight" (featuring Marcus Miller and Steve Cole)	B. Culbertson; Miller	4:16
4.	"Playin'"	B. Culbertson; Dave Koz; Stephen Lu	3:48
5.	"Days Gone By"	B. Culbertson; Glenn McKinney; Lu	5:26
6.	"What Up B?"	B. Culbertson	1:50
7.	"Serpentine Fire"	Maurice White; Reginald Burke; Verdine White	4:11
8.	"Fly High" (featuring Rashaan Patterson)	B. Culbertson; McKinney; Rahsaan Patterson; Lu	4:01
9.	"Last Night" (featuring Rick Braun)	B. Culbertson; Michelle Culbertson	5:20
10.	"Come On Up" (featuring Norman Brown)	B. Culbertson	4:07
11.	"Our Love"	B. Culbertson	4:49
12.	"Funky B"	B. Culbertson	1:46

== Personnel ==
Musicians and vocalists

- Brian Culbertson – acoustic piano, drum programming (2–10, 12), shaker (2), trombone (2, 4, 7 9, 12), additional horn arrangements (2), synth bass (3, 5, 6, 9, 12), keyboards (4–10, 12), Fender Rhodes (4, 5), wah trombone (6), wah clavinet (7), trumpet (9, 12)
- Ricky Peterson – Wurlitzer electric piano (2), Hammond B3 organ (2, 3, 5–9, 11, 12), vocals (2)
- Kenneth Crouch – Fender Rhodes (3), wah clavinet (3)
- Monte Neuble – talk box (7, 8), wah synthesizer (8)
- Dave Hutten – additional keyboards (10)
- Paul Jackson, Jr. – guitars (2, 9), rhythm guitar (4), guitar pad (4), FX guitar (4), acoustic guitar (5)
- Gerey Johnson – guitars (3)
- Glenn McKinney – additional guitars (2), guitars (8)
- Tony Maiden – additional guitars (3), wah guitar (4, 10, 12)
- Michael Thompson – electric guitar (5), EBow guitar (5)
- Jorge Evans – guitars (6, 7)
- Norman Brown – guitar solo (10), vocals (10)
- Alex Al – bass (2, 8)
- Marcus Miller – bass (3, 7)
- Richard Patterson – bass (4, 10)
- Steve Rodby – acoustic bass (11)
- Todd Sucherman – hi-hat (2, 4, 7), cymbals (2, 7)
- Stephen Lu – drum programming (3, 4), additional keyboards (4, 5, 8), Victrolla operator (5), ‘the Wah Flavor’ (7)
- Oscar Seaton Jr. – hi-hat (3), cymbals (3)
- Lenny Castro – congas (2), timbales (2), shaker (5, 10), percussion (6, 7, 9, 12), clay hand drums (10)
- Brian Ripp – baritone saxophone (2, 7)
- Steve Cole – tenor saxophone (2–4), soprano saxophone (3), alto saxophone (4), high chorus flute hit (10)
- Carly Bauer – low intro flute (10)
- Bill Reichenbach Jr. – bass trombone (2, 7), tenor trombone (2, 7)
- Gary Grant – trumpet (2, 7)
- Jerry Hey – trumpet (2, 7), horn arrangements (2), horn transcription and additional arrangements (7)
- Rick Braun – muted trumpet solo (9)
- Justin Hori – scratches (10), beat box (10)
- Rahsaan Patterson – vocals (8)

String section (tracks 3, 5, 10 & 11)

- Cliff Colnot – string arrangements and orchestration (3, 10, 11), string quartet arrangements (5)
- Brian Culbertson – additional string arrangements (5)
- Stephen Lu – additional string arrangements (5)
- Peter LaBella – concertmaster (3, 10, 11)

Cello

- Stephen Balderston (3, 5, 10, 11)
- Katinka Kleijn (3, 10, 11)
- Gary Stucka (3, 10, 11)
- Brant Taylor (3, 10, 11)

Viola

- Catherine Brubaker (3, 10, 11)
- Li-Kuo Chang (3, 10, 11)
- Karen Dirks (3, 10, 11)
- Baird Dodge (3, 10, 11)
- Robert Swan (3, 10, 11)
- Terri Van Valkinburgh (3, 5, 10, 11)

Violin

- Kevin Case (3, 10, 11)
- Laura Chen (3, 10, 11)
- Teresa Fream (3, 5, 10, 11)
- Stefan Hersh (3, 10, 11)
- Russell Hershow (3, 10, 11)
- David Hildner (3, 10, 11)
- Ellen Hildner (3, 10, 11)
- Marlou Johnston (3, 10, 11)
- Peter LaBella (3, 5, 10, 11)
- Jennifer Marlas (3, 10, 11)
- Rika Seko (3, 10, 11)
- Susan Synnestvedt (3, 10, 11)
- David Taylor (3, 10, 11)
- Yuan Qing Yu (3, 10, 11)

Party vocals (tracks 2 & 11)

- Craig Bauer
- Steve Cole
- Brian Culbertson
- Jim Culbertson
- Michelle Culbertson
- Dave Hutten
- Steve Johnson
- Stephen Lu
- Ricky Peterson
- Oscar Seaton Jr.
- Scott Steiner

== Production ==
- Matt Pierson – executive producer
- Michelle Culbertson – executive producer, grooming, leg model
- Brian Culbertson – executive producer, producer, arrangements
- Stephen Lu – producer (3–5, 7, 8), arrangements (3–5, 7, 8)
- Scott Steiner – co-producer for piano tracks
- Greg Ross – art direction, design
- Daniel Ray – photography
- Julie Ray – production coordinator for photo shoot
- Valerie Lefort – grooming
- David K. – stylist
- Thom Santee for Auntie M Creative Consultants – management

Technical credits

- Steve Hall – mastering at Future Disc (Hollywood, California)
- Craig Bauer – recording, mixing, Pro Tools editing
- Brian Culbertson – recording, Pro Tools editing
- Steve Johnson – recording, mix assistant, Pro Tools editing
- Eddie King – recording
- Scott Steiner – recording, Pro Tools editing
- Stephen Lu – Pro Tools editing

== Charts ==
Chart (2003)	Peak position
US Billboard 200	197
US Top Contemporary Jazz Albums (Billboard)	3
US Top Jazz Albums (Billboard)	3
