= Always Remember (Brian Culbertson song) =

2008 song by Brian Culbertson

Single by Brian Culbertson

from the album Bringing Back The Funk
- Released: 2008
- Genre: R&B
- Label: GRP Records
- Songwriter(s): Brian Culbertson, Sheldon Reynolds
- Producer(s): Maurice White

Brian Culbertson singles chronology
"Angels We Have Heard on High" (2007)	"Always Remember" (2008)	"Let's Stay In Tonight" (2009)

"Always Remember" is a song by Brian Culbertson , released as a single in 2008 on GRP Records. The single peaked at No. 1 on the US Billboard Smooth Jazz Songs chart.

== Critical reception ==
Brian Soergel of JazzTimes declared, "Sheldon Reynolds, former EWF member and now a member of Culbertson’s band, sounds as good as ever when his familiar falsetto carries the chorus of...“Always Remember" Johnathan Widran of Allmusic hailed the song saying, "The EWF-inspired Culbertson-Reynolds co-write "Always Remember" shows that no matter how crazy he gets with the production, Culbertson is still a joyfully melodic jazz keyboardist at heart."
