= Somethin' Bout Love =

Studio album by Brian Culbertson
- Released: September 21, 1999
- Studio: Megatrax Studio (North Hollywood, California); BCM Digital Studios (Los Angeles, California); Hinge Studios (Chicago, Illinois)
- Genre: Jazz
- Length: 54:58
- Label: Atlantic/Wea
- Producer: Brian Culbertson; Michael Manson (co-producer on Track 11)

Brian Culbertson chronology
Secrets (1997)	Somethin' Bout Love (1999)	Nice & Slow (2001)

Professional ratings
Review scores
Source	Rating
AllMusic	3/5 stars

Somethin' Bout Love is the fifth studio album of keyboardist Brian Culbertson released in 1999 on Atlantic/WEA Records. The album reached No. 3 on the Billboard Contemporary Jazz Albums chart and No. 8 on the Billboard Top Jazz Albums chart.

== Singles ==
"Get'n Over You" reached No. 16 on the Billboard Adult R&B Songs chart. "I'm Gonna Miss You" reached No. 21 on the Billboard Adult R&B Songs chart.

== Track listing ==
No.	Title	Writer(s)	Length
1.	"Somthin' Bout Love"	Donnell Spencer Jr.	4:46
2.	"Do You Really Love Me?"	Brian Culbertson	4:34
3.	"Get'n Over You"	Lori Perry	3:31
4.	"The Secret Garden" (Instrumental)	El DeBarge, Quincy Jones, Rod Temperton, Siedah Garrett	6:40
5.	"Sittin' Back"	Brian Culbertson	4:19
6.	"Back in the Day"	Brian Culbertson	4:33
7.	"It's Only You"	Brian Culbertson	4:40
8.	"The Rise and Fall (Of Loving You)"	Brian Culbertson	4:22
9.	"Escape"	Brian Culbertson	4:56
10.	"The Secret Garden"	El DeBarge, Quincy Jones, Rod Temperton, Siedah Garrett	6:24
11.	"I'm Gonna Miss You"	Brian Culbertson	6:13

== Personnel ==
- Brian Culbertson – acoustic piano, keyboards (1–10), synth bass (1, 3, 7, 8, 10), trombone (1, 6), trumpet (1, 6), live bass pops (3), drum programming (3, 4, 6–10), Fender Rhodes (4, 5, 10)
- Ricky Peterson – Hammond B3 organ (1–3, 5, 6, 11)
- Ray Fuller – guitars (1), additional guitars (6)
- Paul Jackson Jr. – guitars (2–5, 7, 10), electric guitar (9), nylon guitar (9)
- Tony Maiden – rhythm guitar (6), guitar solo (6)
- Michael Thompson – acoustic guitar (8), electric guitar (8)
- Gerey Johnson – additional wah guitar (10), guitars (11)
- Alex Al – bass (1, 2, 5, 6)
- Wayman Tisdale – bass solo (7)
- Richard Patterson – bass (9, 11)
- Ricky Lawson – drums (1, 6)
- Michael White – drums (2, 5), cymbals (4, 10)
- Oscar Seaton Jr. – hi-hat (7), cymbals (7), drums (11)
- Todd Sucherman – drums (8)
- Steve Johnson – additional cymbals (10)
- Lenny Castro – percussion (1–10)
- Steve Cole – saxophone (2, 4, 11)
- Dave Koz – saxophone (8)
- Jim Culbertson – flugelhorn (5), muted trumpet (5)
- Donnell Spencer Jr. – vocals (1)
- Lori Perry – lead vocals (3, 11), backing vocals (3, 4, 9), vocal arrangements (3)
- Josie Aiello – backing vocals (4, 9)
- Fred White – backing vocals (4, 9), vocal ad libs (4)
- Howard Hewett – lead vocals (9)
- Kevin Chandler – backing vocals (9)
- Steve Grissette – backing vocals (9)

Choir on "I'm Gonna Miss You"

- Michael Manson and Lori Perry – arrangements
- Aaron Browk, Andrea Brown, Joan Collaso, Kim Gordon, LaToya Hill, Precious Holmes, Jimmie Hudson, Kelvin Lenox, Diane Madison, Pamela Mitchell, Rachel Packer, Janee Pryor, Phillip Purkett, Robin Robinson and Kimberly Waller – singers

== Production ==
- George Nauful – executive producer
- Brian Culbertson – producer, arrangements
- Michael Manson – co-producer (11)
- Craig Bauer – co-producer for piano tracks
- Scott Steiner – co-producer for piano tracks
- Thomas Bricker – art direction
- Jim Wright – photography
- Alexander Gutierrez – styling
- Jennifer Davis – grooming
- Thom Santee for Auntie M Creative Consultants – management
- Free World Music – booking

Technical credits

- Steve Hall – mastering at Future Disc (Hollywood, California)
- Craig Bauer – recording, mixing, Pro Tools editing
- Brian Culbertson – recording
- Eddie King – recording
- Scott Steiner – recording, Pro Tools editing
- Steve Sykes – recording
- Steve Weeder – recording, Pro Tools editing, additional mixing (11)
- Steve Johnson – recording assistant, radar editing
- Matt Prock – recording assistant, radar editing
- Dave Hutton – Pro Tools editing
- Charlie Terr – piano technician
