= Nice & Slow (album) =

Studio album by Brian Culbertson
- Released: June 3, 2001
- Studio: BCM Studios (Los Angeles, California); JHL Sound (Pacific Palisades, California); Cocoa Butt Studios (Culver City, California); Hinge Studios (Chicago, Illinois)
- Genre: Jazz
- Length: 48:04
- Label: Atlantic
- Producer: Brian Culbertson; Donnell Spencer Jr.; Stephen Lu

Brian Culbertson chronology
Somethin' Bout Love (1999)	Nice & Slow (2001)	Come on Up (2003)

Professional ratings
Review scores
Source	Rating
AllMusic	4.5/5 stars

Nice & Slow is the sixth studio album of keyboardist Brian Culbertson released in 2001 on Atlantic Records. The album reached No. 1 on the Billboard Contemporary Jazz Albums chart and No. 2 on the Billboard Top Jazz Albums chart.

== Overview ==
Artists such as Dave Koz, Jeff Lorber, Kirk Whalum, Kenny Lattimore and Herb Alpert appear on the album.

== Track listing ==
No.	Title	Writer(s)	Length
1.	"Just Another Day"	Brian Culbertson, Jeff Lorber	5:03
2.	"Get It On"	Brian Culbertson	4:06
3.	"Nice & Slow"	Brian Culbertson, Donnell Spencer Jr., Sherree Ford-Payne	4:44
4.	"I Could Get Used to This"	Brian Culbertson, Lindy Robbins	4:22
5.	"Without Your Love"	Brian Culbertson	4:51
6.	"Someone"	Brian Culbertson, Kenny Lattimore	3:47
7.	"Prelude to Together Tonight"		0:36
8.	"Together Tonight"	Brian Culbertson	5:40
9.	"All About You"	Brian Culbertson, Dave Koz	3:58
10.	"I Wanna Know"	Jolyon Skinner, Joseph Thomas, Michele Williams	6:42
11.	"Someone" (bonus mix)	Brian Culbertson, Kenny Lattimore	4:15

== Personnel ==
Musicians

- Brian Culbertson – acoustic piano, keyboards (1–6, 8, 9, 11), drum programming (1–6, 8, 9, 11), synth bass (2–4, 6, 11), trombone (2), trumpet (2), Hammond B3 organ (3), "live" bass (3), strings (11)
- Jeff Lorber – Fender Rhodes (1)
- Ricky Peterson – Hammond B3 organ (2, 4, 5, 8, 10), Wurlitzer electric piano (3)
- Stephen Lu – additional keyboards (6, 11), synthesizer programming (6, 11), synth bass (6, 11)
- Eddie Miller – Fender Rhodes (10)
- Paul Jackson Jr. – guitars (1, 5, 8), rhythm guitar (4)
- Tony Maiden – guitars (2, 10), acoustic guitar (3), electric guitar (3)
- Michael Thompson – EBow guitar (4), guitar pad (4), acoustic guitar (9, 11), electric guitar (9, 11), guitar synthesizer (9, 11)
- G. Moe – guitars (6)
- Alex Al – bass (1, 5, 10), "live" bass (2)
- Richard Patterson – bass (8, 9)
- Oscar Seaton Jr. – drums (1)
- Donnell Spencer Jr. – drums (10)
- Lenny Castro – percussion (1, 2, 4, 5, 8–10)
- Jim Reid – tenor saxophone (2, 5)
- Dave Koz – soprano saxophone (4)
- Kirk Whalum – tenor saxophone (10)
- Herb Alpert – trumpet (1)

Vocalists

- Alexx Daye – vocals (2)
- Sherree Ford-Payne – lead vocals (3), backing vocals (3, 6, 11)
- Trey Lorenz – lead vocals (3), backing vocals (3)
- Donnell Spencer Jr. – backing vocals (3)
- Kenny Lattimore – lead vocals (6, 11), backing vocals (6, 11)
- Michelle Culbertson – backing vocals (9)
- Paul Mabin – backing vocals (9)

Music arrangements

- Brian Culbertson – arrangements, vocal arrangements (11)
- Jeff Lorber – arrangements (1)
- Sherree Ford-Payne – vocal arrangements (3)
- Donnell Spencer Jr. – vocal arrangements (3)
- Guy Eckstine – arrangements (6)
- Stephen Lu – arrangements (6, 11), vocal arrangements (11)
- Jim Reid – arrangements (10)
- Kenny Lattimore – vocal arrangements (11)

== Production ==
- Guy Eckstine – executive producer
- Brian Culbertson – producer
- Scott Steiner – piano track producer (1–5, 7–10)
- Donnell Spencer Jr. – vocal co-producer (3)
- Stephen Lu – co-producer (6, 11), piano track producer (6)
- Craig Bauer – piano track producer (11)
- Camille Tominaro – production coordinator
- Lynn Kowalewski – art direction, design
- Dana Tynan – photography
- Orna Tisser – styling
- Brenda Green – grooming
- Thom Santee for Auntie M Creative Consultants, Inc. – management

Technical credits

- Steve Hall – mastering at Future Disc (Hollywood, California)
- Craig Bauer – recording, mixing
- Brian Culbertson – recording
- Eddie King – recording
- Jeff Lorber – recording
- Stephen Lu – recording
- Scott Steiner – recording
- Michael Thompson – recording
- Steve Johnson – recording assistant, digital editing
- Matt Prock – recording assistant, digital editing
- Charlie Terr – piano technician
