= Nice and Slow =

Nice and Slow may refer to:

- Nice & Slow (album), a 2001 album by Brian Culbertson
- "Nice and Slow" (Jesse Green song), 1976
- "Nice 'N' Slow", a 1988 song by Freddie Jackson
- "Nice & Slow", a 1997 song by Usher
- "Nice and Slow, a 2005 song by Samantha Fox from the album Angel with an Attitude
