= A Soulful Christmas (Brian Culbertson album) =

Studio album by Brian Culbertson
- Released: October 31, 2006
- Studios: BCM Studios and B Squared Studios (Los Angeles, California); Megatrax Studio (North Hollywood, California); Hinge Studios (Chicago, Illinois); Franklin, Tennessee
- Genre: Jazz
- Length: 46:53
- Label: GRP
- Producer: Brian Culbertson

Brian Culbertson chronology
It's On Tonight (2005)	A Soulful Christmas (2006)	Bringing Back The Funk (2007)

Professional ratings
Review scores
Source	Rating
AllMusic	4/5 stars
The Washington Post	(favourable)
The Baltimore Sun	(favourable)

A Soulful Christmas is the ninth studio album by keyboardist Brian Culbertson released in 2006 on GRP Records. The album reached No. 17 on the Billboard Contemporary Jazz Albums chart and No. 7 on the Billboard Top Jazz Albums chart.

== Track listing ==
No.	Title	Writer(s)	Length
1.	"Intro - Joy to the World"		0:27
2.	"Joy to the World" (featuring Eric Darius)	Georg Friedrich Händel, Isaac Watts	5:00
3.	"Deck the Halls"	Traditional	3:41
4.	"Jingle Bells"	James Lord Pierpont	4:11
5.	"The First Noel"	Brian Culbertson	3:15
6.	"All Through the Christmas Night" (featuring Michael McDonald)	Brian Culbertson, Marc Nelson	5:26
7.	"Rudolph the Red-Nosed Reindeer"	Johnny Marks	4:32
8.	"Angels We Have Heard On High"	Traditional	5:33
9.	"Some Children See Him" (featuring Michelle Culbertson)	Alfred S. Burt, Wihla Hutson	2:20
10.	"Little Drummer Boy"	Harry Simeone, Henry Onorati	5:14
11.	"This Christmas"	Donny Hathaway, Nadine McKinnor	4:39
12.	"Silent Night featuring Marc Nelson"	Franz Xaver Gruber, Joseph Mohr	2:22

== Personnel ==
Musicians

- Brian Culbertson – acoustic piano, trombone (2, 4, 6, 7, 12), celesta (3), bells (3, 8), muted trumpet (11)
- Eddie Miller – Fender Rhodes (2, 11)
- Ricky Peterson – Hammond B3 organ (2, 4, 6, 7, 11)
- Jeff Lorber – Wurlitzer electric piano (7)
- Paul Jackson Jr. – guitars (2, 6)
- Tony Maiden – wah guitar (2, 7), guitars (4)
- Bruce Watson – slide guitar (3)
- Jorge Evans – wah guitar solo (7), electric guitar (8)
- Peter White – acoustic guitar (8)
- Maurice Fitzgerald – bass (2, 6)
- Nathan East – bass (3, 8)
- Alex Al – electric bass (4)
- Brian Bromberg – acoustic bass (4, 10)
- Derrick Hodge – bass (7, 11)
- Oscar Seaton Jr. – drums (2, 3, 6–8, 11), "funk" drums (4)
- Vinnie Colaiuta – "swing" drums (4), drums (10)
- Lenny Castro – percussion (2–4, 6–8, 10, 11)
- Eric Marienthal – alto saxophone (2, 4, 7), tenor saxophone (2, 4, 6, 7, 11), baritone saxophone (4, 6, 7)
- Eric Darius – tenor sax solo (2)
- Warren Hill – alto saxophone (3)
- Martin Sullivan – trombone (1)
- Rob Schaer – trumpet (1), piccolo trumpet (1)
- Michael Stever – trumpet (1, 2), horn contractor (1)
- Wayne Bergeron – trumpet (2, 4, 6, 7, 11)
- Zach Collins – tuba (1)
- Jennifer Kessler – French horn (1)
- Michael McDonald – vocals (6)
- Michelle Culbertson – vocals (9)
- Marc Nelson – vocals (12)

Music arrangements

- Brian Culbertson – rhythm arrangements, horn arrangements (2, 6, 7, 11)
- Eric Marienthal – horn arrangements (2, 6, 7, 11)
- Maurice Fitzgerald – arrangements (2)
- Eddie Miller – arrangements (2)
- Dave Koz – arrangements (3)
- Matt Harris – big band arrangements (4)
- Jeff Lorber – arrangements (7)
- Peter White – arrangements (8)
- Michelle Culbertson – arrangements (9)
- Marc Nelson – vocal arrangements (12)

Orchestra

- Cliff Colnot – orchestrations and arrangements
- Jennifer Pedraza – contractor
- Thomas Schaller – copyist
- Peter LaBella – concertmaster

Horns and Woodwinds

- Dave Griffin – French horn
- Jelena Dirks – oboe

String section

- Dan Klinger, Nick Photinos and Gary Stucks – cello
- Collins Trier – double bass
- Alison Attar – harp
- Matt Albert, Ying Chai, Baird Dodge, Teresa Fream, Tom Hall, Peter LaBella, Carmen Llop Kassinger, Nancy Park, Paul Phillips, Ron Satkowitz, Rika Seko and Robert Waters – violin

The Jason White Ensemble (Tracks 2 & 6)

- Jason White – choir director and arrangements
- Keith Allen, Brittany Batson, Troy Clark, David Daughtry, Lashann Dendy, Chara Hammonds, Demeka Jackson, Shanika Leeks, Sharon Norwood, Melody Rhynes, Precious Umunna, Geneen White, Otha White and Brandon Winbush – choir singers

== Production ==
- Brian Culbertson – producer
- Scott Steiner – co-producer (5, 9, 12)
- Evelyn Morgan – A&R administrator
- Theodora Kuslan – release coordinator
- Kelly Pratt – release coordinator
- Sara Zickuhr – cover design
- Rocky Schenck – photography
- David K. – wardrobe stylist
- Merrilee McLain – hair stylist
- David Britz and Garry C. Kief for Stiletto Entertainment – management

Technical credits

- Bernie Grundman – mastering at Bernie Grundman Mastering (Hollywood, California)
- Brian Culbertson – recording, mixing
- Eddie King – recording, additional recording
- Scott Steiner – recording, mixing, piano track engineer(5, 9, 12)
- Michael Stever – mix assistant
- Craig Bauer – additional recording
- Shannon Forrest – additional recording
- Tom McCauley – additional recording
- James Karukas – piano technician
