= Another Long Night Out =

Studio album by Brian Culbertson
- Released: February 25, 2014
- Studio: Ahhsum Studios (West Covina, California); Ancient Pathways Studio (Thousand Oaks, California); BCM Studios and Orchestra.net (Los Angeles, California); Cocoa-Butt Studios (Culver City, California); Echobar Studios (Burbank, California); Surfboard Studios (Santa Monica, California); Coastal Access Studio (Seattle, Washington); Workhouse (St. Paul, Minnesota); Studio Smeky (Prague, Czech Republic)
- Genre: Soul music, smooth jazz
- Length: 55:25
- Label: BCM Entertainment Inc.
- Producer: Brian Culbertson

Brian Culbertson chronology
Dreams (2012)	Another Long Night Out (2014)	Funk! (2016)

Professional ratings
Review scores
Source	Rating
AllMusic	3.5/5 stars

Another Long Night Out is a studio album by Brian Culbertson released in 2014 by BCM Entertainment Inc. The album peaked at number one on both the Billboard Top Jazz Albums and Top Contemporary Jazz Albums charts. Another Long Night Out also reached No. 17 on the Billboard Independent Albums chart.

== Overview ==
Artists such as Ray Parker Jr., Steve Lukather, Lee Ritenour, Paul Jackson Jr., Nathan East, Larry Dunn, Lenny Castro, Jonathan Butler and Candy Dulfer appeared on the album.

== Singles ==
"Fullerton Ave." featuring Chuck Loeb peaked at No. 1 and "Horizon" featuring Patches Stewart reached No. 2 on the Billboard Smooth Jazz Airplay chart.

== Critical reception ==
Thom Jurek of AllMusic wrote "This re-imagined Another Long Night Out was a risky venture for obvious reasons. Yet it reveals more expansive harmonies, looser grooves, and more elegant textures. Culbertson's vision has matured over 20 years, but more surprising is how alluring these melodies were in the first place — and just how timeless they remain even in a completely different setting."

== Track listing ==
Track No.	Title	Writer(s)	Length
1	"City Lights"	Brian Culbertson	05:56
2	"Fullerton Ave."	Brian Culbertson	05:58
3	"Beyond The Frontier"	Brian Culbertson	04:39
4	"Heroes of the Dawn"	Brian Culbertson	05:32
5	"Beautiful Liar"	Brian Culbertson	04:19
6	"Double Exposure"	Brian Culbertson, Scott Steiner	04:35
7	"Twilight"	Brian Culbertson	04:08
8	"Horizon"	Brian Culbertson	04:28
9	"Alone With You"	Brian Culbertson	06:35
10	"Long Night Out"	Brian Culbertson	04:57
11	"Changing Tides"	Brian Culbertson	04:08

== Personnel ==
- Brian Culbertson – acoustic piano, keyboards, Fender Rhodes (1–4, 6–8, 10), trombone (1, 2, 4, 10), horn arrangements (1), Wurlitzer electric piano (2, 8, 10), slap bass (2), tambourine (2), muted trombone (3), euphonium (3), synth bass (8), string arrangements (10)
- Ricky Peterson – Hammond B3 organ (1, 2, 8)
- Lee Ritenour – lead guitar (1)
- Ray Parker Jr. – rhythm guitar (2), distorted guitar (8), wah guitar (8), guitars (10)
- Chuck Loeb – lead guitar (2), FX guitar (2, 9), guitars (4), guitar intro (9), guitar pads (9)
- Paul Jackson Jr. – rhythm guitar (2, 6, 9), guitars (7), additional rhythm guitar (8)
- Michael Thompson – lead guitar (3), acoustic guitar (3, 5, 11), electric guitar (3, 5, 11), electric sitar (3), Chinese banjo (3), EBow guitar (5, 11)
- Steve Lukather – lead guitar (5)
- Russ Freeman – lead guitars (6)
- Jonathan Butler – nylon guitar (11), vocals (11)
- Alex Al – bass (1, 3, 8, 10)
- Jimmy Haslip – bass (2, 4, 6, 7, 9), fretless bass (4, 6)
- Nathan East – bass (5, 11)
- Michael Bland – drums (1, 3, 8)
- Will Kennedy – drums (2, 4, 6, 7, 9)
- Ricky Lawson – drums (5, 11)
- Lenny Castro – percussion (1–9, 11), congas (10), timbales (10)
- Brian Kilgore – tabla (3), marimbas (10), African percussion (10)
- Larry Dunn – kalimba (10)
- Eric Marienthal – alto saxophone (2), tenor saxophone (2, 10), soprano saxophone (4, 7)
- Jeff Kashiwa – alto saxophone (6), tenor saxophone (6)
- Candy Dulfer – alto saxophone (10)
- Rick Braun – valve trombone (4), flugelhorn (4)
- Michael Stever – flugelhorn (1), horn arrangements (1, 2, 10)
- Michael "Patches" Stewart – muted trumpet (1), trumpet (2, 8, 10)
- David Benoit – string arrangements (3, 5, 10, 11)
- Adam Klemens – string conductor (3, 5, 10, 11)
- Bohumil Kotmel – concertmaster (3, 5, 10, 11)
- Micaela Haley – backing vocals (11)

== Production ==
- Brian Culbertson – producer, arrangements, artwork design, liner notes, wardrobe
- Micaela Haley – co-producer (piano tracks), wardrobe
- Michael Stever – music transcriptions and preparation
- Kel Benoit – string music preparation
- Nick DuPlessis – packaging layout
- Daniel Ray – photography
- Lloyd Johnson – photography assistant
- Kurt Weiss – photography assistant
- Daniel Nevins – painting
- Merrilee McLain – hair stylist
- Jeanne Townsend – make-up artist
- Davis Britz for Westchester Productions – management

Technical credits

- Gene Grimaldi – mastering at Oasis Mastering (Burbank, California)
- Brian Culbertson – engineer, mixing, additional recording
- Bob Horn – mixing, additional recording
- Micaela Haley – piano track engineer, mix consultant, additional recording
- Scott Steiner – mix consultant
- Russ Freeman – additional recording
- Jeff Kashiwa – additional recording
- Gordon Rustvold – additional recording
- Jim Ryberg – additional recording
- Michael Thompson – additional recording
- Kit Kral – string recording (3, 5, 10, 11)
- Steve Salani – string recording (3, 5, 10, 11)
- Ron Tuttle – piano technician

== Charts ==
Chart (2014)	Peak position
US Billboard 200	83
US Top Jazz Albums (Billboard)	1
US Top Contemporary Jazz Albums (Billboard)	1
US Independent Albums (Billboard)	17
UK Jazz & Blue Albums (OCC)	23
