= The Trilogy – Part 1: Red =

Studio album by Brian Culbertson
- Released: 2021
- Genre: Soul music, smooth jazz
- Label: BCM Entertainment Inc.
- Producer: Brian Culbertson

Brian Culbertson chronology
XX (2020)	The Trilogy – Part 1: Red (2021)	The Trilogy – Part 2: Blue (2022)

The Trilogy – Part 1: Red is a studio album by Brian Culbertson released in 2021 on BCM Entertainment Inc. The album peaked at No. 8 on the US Billboard Top Contemporary Jazz chart.

== Tracklisting ==
No.	Title	Writer(s)	Length
1.	"Feel the Love"	Brian Culbertson	6:52
2.	"Just Let Go"	Brian Culbertson	5:26
3.	"Come On Over"	Brian Culbertson	4:45
4.	"Infatuation"	Brian Culbertson	5:09
5.	"Deep in the Night"	Brian Culbertson	5:59
6.	"Whispers"	Brian Culbertson	5:20
7.	"Eyes Closed"	Brian Culbertson	5:02
8.	"Lost in You"	Brian Culbertson	4:23
9.	"One More Kiss"	Brian Culbertson	6:34
10.	"Dreamstate"	Brian Culbertson	5:50
