= Winter Stories (Brian Culbertson album) =

Studio album by Brian Culbertson
- Released: October 4, 2019
- Studio: BCM Studios (Los Angeles, California); Hinge Studios (Chicago, Illinois)
- Genre: Soul music, smooth jazz
- Length: 43:37
- Label: BCM Entertainment Inc.
- Producer: Brian Culbertson

Brian Culbertson chronology
Colors of Love (2018)	Winter Stories (2019)	XX (2020)

Winter Stories is a studio album by Brian Culbertson released in 2019 on BCM Entertainment Inc. The album peaked at No. 3 on the US Billboard Top Jazz Albums chart and No. 1 on the US Billboard Top Contemporary Jazz chart.

== Track listing ==
No.	Title	Writer(s)	Length
1.	"Sitting by the Fire"	Brian Culbertson	3:45
2.	"Montana Skies"	Brian Culbertson	5:10
3.	"Morning Walk"	Brian Culbertson	5:11
4.	"Flurries"	Brian Culbertson	4:40
5.	"City Sleigh Ride"	Brian Culbertson	3:33
6.	"Waltz for M"	Brian Culbertson	4:59
7.	"Island Dream"	Brian Culbertson	4:33
8.	"Northern Lights"	Brian Culbertson	2:53
9.	"Frosted Window"	Brian Culbertson	5:38
10.	"Staryy Night"	Brian Culbertson	3:15

== Personnel ==
- Brian Culbertson – acoustic piano, Fender Rhodes, Wurlitzer electric piano, Hammond B3 organ, celeste, percussion
- Steve Rodby – acoustic bass
- Khari Parker – drums
- Lenny Castro – bongos (5, 7), sleigh bells (5, 7), shakers (5, 7)

== Production ==
- Micaela Haley – executive producer
- Brian Culbertson – executive producer, producer, arrangements, art direction, design, wardrobe styling
- Michael Stever – music transcriptions and preparation
- Gina Perillo – original artwork cover painting
- Robert Beatty – artwork layout and preparation
- Daniel Ray – photography
- Merrilee McLain – hair
- David Britz and W. Luke Pierce for WORKS Entertainment – management

Technical credits

- Dave Collins – mastering at Dave Collins Mastering (Los Angeles, California)
- Craig Bauer – mixing
- Brian Culbertson – mixing, engineer (pianos, B3 organ, celeste, bass, percussion)
- Scott Steiner – piano engineer
- Steve Rodby – bass engineer
- Matt Prock – drum engineer
- Jordan Silva – percussion engineer for Lenny Castro (5, 7)
- Alex Burns – studio technician
- Joshua Younger – piano technician
