= XII (Brian Culbertson album) =

Studio album by Brian Culbertson
- Released: July 20, 2010
- Studios: BCM Studios, The Boat and Angel Sound (Los Angeles, California); The Hive Studios (North Hollywood, California); Cocoa Butt Studio (Culver City, California); Infinite Sound Studios (Bryans Road, Maryland)
- Genres: Soul music, smooth jazz
- Length: 55:45
- Label: GRP
- Producers: Brian Culbertson; Rex Rideout; Scott Steiner

Brian Culbertson chronology
Bringing Back the Funk (2008)	XII (2010)	Dreams (2012)

Professional ratings
Review scores
Source	Rating
AllMusic	4/5 stars

XII is a studio album by Brian Culbertson released in 2010 by GRP Records. The album peaked at number two on the Billboard Top Jazz Albums chart, number one on the Billboard Top Contemporary Jazz Albums chart, and number 15 on the Billboard Top R&B/Hip-Hop Albums chart.

== Overview ==
Artists such as Ray Parker Jr., Kenny Lattimore, Brian McKnight, Chuck Brown, Earl Klugh, Faith Evans and Avant are featured on the album.

== Singles ==
"That's Life" featuring Earl Klugh reached number one on the Billboard Smooth Jazz Songs chart. "Skies Wide Open" featuring Avant reached number 13 on the Billboard Adult R&B Songs chart.

== Track listing ==
Track No.	Title	Writer(s)	Length
1	"Feelin' It"	Chuck Brown, Brian Culbertson, Uno	04:29
2	"Another Love"	Brian Culbertson, Kenny Lattimore, Rex Rideout	04:05
3	"It's Time"	Brian Culbertson, Sheldon Reynolds	04:05
4	"Out on the Floor"	Brian Culbertson, Brian McKnight	05:03
5	"Waiting for You"	Brian Culbertson, Stephen Lu	04:38
6	"Stay wit It"	Brian Culbertson, Stephen Lu	04:05
7	"Skies Wide Open"	Brian Culbertson, Avant, Rex Rideout	04:38
8	"Forever"	Brian Culbertson, Sheldon Reynolds	04:26
9	"Don't U Know Me by Now"	Brian Culbertson, Rex Rideout, Natalie Stewart	04:49
10	"That's Life"	Brian Culbertson, Ray Parker Jr., Earl Klugh	04:38
11	"I Wanna Love You"	Brian Culbertson, Ray Parker Jr.	05:41
12	"I Don't Know"	Brian Culbertson, Natalie Stewart	05:08

== Personnel ==
Musicians and vocalists

- Brian Culbertson – acoustic piano, keyboards, Wurlitzer electric piano (1), clavinet (1), Hammond B3 organ (1, 5, 8–11), drum programming (1, 2, 4–8, 10–12), cowbell (1, 10), trombone (1, 3, 9, 10), synth bass (2–8, 10–12), Rhodes electric piano (3, 4, 10, 11), percussion (5, 11, 12), euphonium (6, 11), acoustic guitar (12), bass (12), vocals (12)
- Chuck Brown – wah guitar (1), guitar solo (1), vocals (1)
- Ray Parker Jr. – guitars (1, 6), acoustic guitar (8, 11), electric guitar (10, 11), vocals (11)
- Sinbad – guitars (1), hi-hat (1)
- Paul Jackson Jr. – guitars (2, 3)
- Randy Bowland – guitars (4, 7, 9)
- Bruce Watson – acoustic guitar (5)
- Randy Jacobs – guitars (6)
- Michael Thompson – guitar solo (8)
- Earl Klugh – acoustic guitar (8)
- Jorge Evans – guitars (11), electric guitar (12)
- Alex Al – bass (1, 6)
- Nathan Watts – bass (3)
- Rex Rideout – additional drum programming (2), Rhodes electric piano (7), keyboards (9), synth bass (9), drum programming (9)
- Oscar Seaton Jr. – drums (3), hi-hat (6)
- Lenny Castro – congas (1), percussion (3, 10)
- Bryan Mills – tenor saxophone (1, 6)
- Eric Marienthal – tenor saxophone (3, 9, 10), baritone saxophone (9)
- Greg Boyer– trombone (1, 6), horn arrangements (1, 6)
- Brad Clements – trumpet (1, 6)
- Dan Fornero – trumpet (3, 9, 10)
- Scott Steiner – euphonium (11)
- Michael Stever – horn arrangements (3, 10)
- Nick Lane – horn arrangements (9)
- Kevin "Uno" Blackmon – backing vocals (1)
- Kenny Lattimore – vocals (2)
- Brian McKnight – lead vocals (4), backing vocals (4)
- Marc Nelson – additional backing vocals (4)
- Marylin Reynolds – vocals (5)
- Sheldon Reynolds – vocals (5)
- Avant – vocals (7)
- Faith Evans – vocals (9)
- Natalie Stewart – spoken word (12)

String section (tracks 2, 3 & 9)

- Brian Culbertson and Nick Lane – string arrangements
- Rex Rideout – co-string arrangements (2)
- David Low – cello
- Andrew Duckles and Darrin McCann – viola
- Charlie Bisharat, Kevin Connolly, Julian Hallmark and Sara Parkins – violin

Party vocals on "Feelin' It"

- Chuck Brown, Brian Culbertson, Faith Evans, Kye Russaw, Chucky Thompson and Brad Todd

== Production ==
- David Britz – executive producer, management
- Dahlia Ambach Caplin – executive producer, A&R direction
- Brian Culbertson – executive producer, producer, arrangements, wardrobe stylist
- Scott Steiner – co-producer for piano tracks (1, 3, 5, 6, 8, 10–12)
- Rex Rideout – producer (2, 7, 9), arrangements (2, 7, 9)
- Evelyn Morgan – A&R administrator
- JoAnn Tominaga – project coordinator
- John Scholz – additional project coordinator
- Vartan Kurjian – art direction
- Kevin Reagan – artwork, design
- Daniel Ray – photography
- Kurt Weiss – additional photography
- Teena Collins – wardrobe stylist
- Merrilee McLain – hair stylist
- Jeanne Townsend – make-up
- Garry C. Kief – management
- Stiletto Entertainment – management company

Technical credits

- Chris Gehringer – mastering at Sterling Sound (New York City, New York)
- Brian Culbertson – recording, mixing
- Bob Horn – recording, mixing
- Eddie King – recording
- Steven Miller – recording
- Sheldon Reynolds – recording
- Rex Rideout – recording
- Scott Steiner – recording, piano track recording
- Michael Thompson – recording
- Brad Todd – recording
- Marcus Young – recording
- Patrick Hewlitt – assistant engineer
- Alyssa Pittaluga – assistant engineer
- Jon Tehel – assistant engineer
- Lena Lundal – digital technician
- Ron Tuttle – piano technician

== Charts ==
Chart (2010)	Peak position
US Billboard 200	82
US Top Jazz Albums (Billboard)	2
US Top Contemporary Jazz Albums (Billboard)	1
US Top R&B/Hip-Hop Albums (Billboard)	15
