= Worlds Apart (Soleil Moon album) =

Studio album by Soleil Moon
- Released: March 7, 2000
- Recorded: Abbey Road Studios (London); Hinge Studios (Chicago); Echo Park Studios (Bloomington); Capitol Studios (Hollywood)
- Label: MFO Entertainment
- Producer: Larry King

Soleil Moon chronology
Worlds Apart (2000)	On the Way to Everything (2011)

Professional ratings
Review scores
Source	Rating
Melodic.net	4/4 stars
Glorydaze Music	positive
L.A.S.Y.S. Inc	positive
Musical Discoveries	positive

Worlds Apart is the debut album by Soleil Moon. It was co-written by Larry King and John Blasucci, and released on MFO Records in 2000.

== Production ==
The 12 tracks were produced, co-written, and arranged by the duo of Larry King and John Blasucci. Among the studio musicians enlisted to participate in the recording sessions were the London Symphony Orchestra, session guitarist Michael Thompson, jazz musician Paul Jackson, Jr., Warren Hill on saxophone, percussionist Lenny Castro, drummer Kenny Aronoff of Lynyrd Skynyrd and the Smashing Pumpkins, and Todd Sucherman of Styx. Many others were also participants in the Larry King Orchestra. Worlds Apart was released under King's label MFO Records.

== Reception ==
In 2000, various tracks from the album including "Willingly" and "Never Say Goodbye" charted on the Adult Contemporary Top 100.

Reviews for the album positive, Glory Daze Music saying "As far as genre's go, Soleil Moon could fit into numerous. Smooth jazz would be one. West Coast another. 80's pop is a good fit too. The production on Worlds Apart is utterly first class, there is a depth to it that disappears out of sight, the soul and emotion displayed on all the songs is a connection very few musicians (let alone a duo) can expect to achieve in a lifetime." Another review also espoused the production quality, saying "Normally, with more or less independent releases on small labels (or no label at all) it's the production that fails the most. Not here!"

About the style, Musical Discoveries stated "the band's first album blends singer Larry King's epic rock instincts with Blasucci's sleek-flavored approach. A truly unique jazz/pop style has been used by the group in a form never achieved by any other artist."

== Track listing ==
No.	Title	Length
1.	"Willingly"	4:08
2.	"Never Say Goodbye"	4:53
3.	"Ohio"	6:26
4.	"Warm Summer Rain"	5:35
5.	"Worlds Apart"	3:56
6.	"I'd Die For You" (Orchestral Introduction)	1:04
7.	"I'd Die For You"	4:57
8.	"You & Me"	4:52
9.	"Calling On The World"	5:48
10.	"I Need You Close To Me"	5:18
11.	"Love Me Like You Used To"	3:11
12.	"What Are You Dreaming"	3:34

== Personnel ==
Instruments, production

- Larry King - vocals, co-writing, production
- John Blasucci - keyboards, piano, programming, co-writing
- London Symphony Orchestra
- Michael Thompson - guitar
- Paul Jackson Jr. - guitar
- Warren Hill - saxophone
- Lenny Castro - percussion
- Kenny Aronoff - drums
- Todd Sucherman - drums
- Craig Bauer - Wha Wha keyboards
- Ricky Peterson - organ
- Bob Lizik - bass
- Richard Patterson - bass

Background vocals

- Kathleen O'Brien
- Pamela Rose
- Phoebe Fuller
- Becca Kaufman
- Donna Lori
- Yvonne Gage
- Paul Mabin
- Jeffrey Morrow
