= Funk! =

Studio album by Brian Culbertson
- Released: September 30, 2016
- Studio: BCM Studios (Chicago, Illinois); The Echo Bar Recording Studio and Fever Recording Studios (North Hollywood, California); Chibola Studios (Los Angeles, California); Port Wine Studio (Minneapolis, Minnesota)
- Genre: Soul music, smooth jazz
- Length: 52:34
- Label: BCM Entertainment Inc.
- Producer: Brian Culbertson

Brian Culbertson chronology
Breathe - Piano for Relaxation, Massage, Yoga and Meditation (2014)	Funk! (2016)	Colors of Love (2018)

Funk! is a studio album by Brian Culbertson released in 2016 by BCM Entertainment Inc. The album peaked at No. 3 on the US Billboard Top Jazz Albums chart and No. 1 on the US Billboard Top Contemporary Jazz chart.

== Critical reception ==
Clint Rhodes of the Herald Standard claimed, "Brian Culbertson is on a mission to bring back the funk on his latest studio album. Just like his 2008 release, Bring Back the Funk, the talented keyboard player, composer, and multi-instrumentalist swaps out his signature contemporary jazz stylings for a throwback funk explosion."

== Track listing ==
No.	Title	Writer(s)	Length
1.	"Get Ready"	Brian Culbertson, Stanley "Chance" Howard, Paul Peterson	5:28
2.	"The Call"	Brian Culbertson, Stanley "Chance" Howard, Rodney Jones Jr.	4:09
3.	"Been Around the World"	Brian Culbertson, Stanley "Chance" Howard, Paul Peterson	4:39
4.	"Take It Up"	Brian Culbertson, Major Johnson Finley, Rodney Jones Jr.	4:15
5.	"Let's Take a Ride"	Brian Culbertson, Stanley "Chance" Howard, Sheldon Reynolds, Stephen Lu	3:45
6.	"We Got What You Want"	Brian Culbertson, Marqueal Jordan, Rodney Jones Jr.	4:02
7.	"Sunshine"	Brian Culbertson, Stanley "Chance" Howard, Chris Miskel, Rodney Jones Jr., Tyrone Chase	1:09
8.	"Hey Girl"	Brian Culbertson, Rodney Jones Jr.	4:36
9.	"Damn, I'm Hungry"	Brian Culbertson, Stanley "Chance" Howard, Chris Miskel, Rodney Jones Jr., Tyrone Chase	1:04
10.	"Got to Give It Up"	Marvin Gaye	4:53
11.	"Mile Sauce"	Brian Culbertson, Ray Parker Jr.	3:43
12.	"Play That Funky Music"	Robert Parissi	4:24
13.	"Spend a Little Time"	Brian Culbertson, Stanley "Chance" Howard	5:21
14.	"To Be Continued..."	Brian Culbertson, Rodney Jones Jr.	1:05

== Personnel ==
Musicians

- Brian Culbertson – acoustic piano (1–6, 8, 10–13), Fender Rhodes (1–4, 6, 13), clavinet (1–8, 10, 12), Hammond B3 organ (1, 3, 4, 7–9), percussion (1–4, 6–14), trombone (1–6, 8, 10–14), Wurlitzer electric piano (3–5, 8, 14), lead synthesizers (4–6, 8, 9), synth strings (4, 5, 11), "underwater" bass (4), "jet phaser" bass (4, 5, 11), synth bass (5, 8, 10), drums (6), keyboards (8), gong (11)
- Eddie Miller – Hammond B3 organ (2, 10, 12), Fender Rhodes (10), clavinet (11)
- Tyrone Chase – guitars (1, 3, 5, 7, 8, 11–14), additional guitars (2), talkbox guitar (8), rhythm guitar (10), guitar solo (10)
- Paul Peterson – guitars (1, 3)
- Rodney Jones Jr. – guitars (2, 4, 6), bass (2, 4, 6, 8, 10–12), drums (2), slap wah bass (5), clavinet (9, 14)
- Sheldon Reynolds – guitars (5)
- Chance Howard – bass (1, 3, 13), synth bass (1, 3, 4, 7, 9, 11, 12, 14), "stanky" synthesizer (5), synthesizers (10)
- Bob Horn – distorted bass (12)
- Franklin "Third" Richardson – drums (1, 3, 5)
- Khari Parker – drums (4, 8, 13)
- Chris Miskel – china cymbal (5), drums (7, 9–12, 14)
- Marqueal Jordan – baritone saxophone (1–4, 10), tenor saxophone (1–6, 8, 10–13)
- Michael Stever – trumpet (1–6, 8, 10–13), all horn arrangements

Vocalists

- Brian Culbertson – lead vocals (1), bass vocals (1), vocals (2–7, 9, 11), gang vocals (10), group vocals (12)
- Marqueal Jordan – vocals (1, 3–5, 11–13), lead vocals (2, 6, 10), gang vocals (10), group vocals (12)
- Eddie Miller – vocals (1–3, 10), gang vocals (10), group vocals (12), lead vocals (13)
- Chance Howard – vocals (2, 5, 6, 10, 12, 13), lead vocals (3), gang vocals (10), group vocals (12)
- Rodney Jones Jr. – vocals (2, 4), gang vocals (10), group vocals (12)
- Major Johnson Finley – vocals (4)
- Chris Miskel – vocals (7, 9, 11), gang vocals (10), group vocals (12)
- Michael Stever – gang vocals (10), vocals (11), group vocals (12)
- Angela Martin – "I heard that" vocal (10), vocals (11)
- Tyrone Chase – group vocals (12)

== Production ==
- Brian Culbertson – executive producer, producer, arrangements, art direction
- Micaela Haley – executive producer, co-producer for piano tracks
- Chance Howard – additional production
- Rodney Jones Jr. – additional production
- Katie Campbell – logo design
- Nick DuPlessis – artwork layout, design
- Daniel Ray – photography
- David Hillerby – photography assistant
- Merrilee McLain – hair stylist
- Sir Tom Baker – wardrobe
- David Britz – management
- W. Luke Pierce – management
- WORKS Entertainment – management company

Technical credits

- Gene Grimaldi – mastering at Oasis Mastering (Burbank, California)
- Brian Culbertson – mixing
- Bob Horn – mixing
- Matt Prock – recording
- Micaela Haley – mix consultant, additional recording
- Chance Howard – mix consultant
- Scott Steiner – mix consultant, additional recording
- Stephen Lu –additional recording
- Paul Peterson – additional recording
- Larry Whitt – additional recording
- Josh Shapera – studio technician
- Stephen Young – piano technician
