= From the Start (disambiguation) =

"From the Start" is a 2023 song by Laufey.

From the Start may also refer to:

- "From the Start", Jazz chart #1 single by Steve Cole from Between Us
- "From the Start", a song by Ryan Cabrera from You Stand Watching
- "From the Start", a song by B. J. Thomas, 1979
- "From the Start", a song by Rachelle Ann Go, 2004
- "From the Start", a song by Chad Gilbert from That New Sound You're Looking For, 2015
