= NY LA =

Studio album by Steve Cole
- Released: 2003
- Genre: Jazz
- Length: 45:21
- Label: Warner Brothers

Steve Cole chronology
Between Us (2000)	NY LA (2003)	Spin (2005)

Professional ratings
Review scores
Source	Rating
Allmusic	4.5/5 stars

NY LA is a 2003 album by jazz musician Steve Cole. It features keyboards by Brian Culbertson and Marquis Dair and also vocals by Mauli B. It is Steve Cole's third studio album and reached as high as number six on the Billboard Top Contemporary Jazz Albums List. It includes the hit song "Off Broadway" which went to the top of the charts in 2003.

== Track listing ==
1. "NY LA" – 3:38
2. "Everyday" – 4:19
3. "Tonight It's On" (featuring Charlean Hines) – 3:31
4. "Love Letter" – 4:48
5. "Off Broadway" – 4:18
6. "Interlude IV" – 2:05
7. "Every Little Thing" – 3:27
8. "Missing You" – 4:45
9. "Close Your Eyes" – 3:38
10. "Keep It Live" (featuring Brevi and Aloe Blacc) – 10:33
