= Secrets (Brian Culbertson album) =

Studio album by Brian Culbertson
- Released: September 16, 1997
- Studio: Hinge Studios (Chicago, Illinois); Entourage Studios and Studio Sound Recorders (North Hollywood, California); Funky Joint Studios (Sherman Oaks, California); Live Wire Studios (New York City, New York)
- Genre: Jazz
- Length: 44:56
- Label: Mesa/Bluemoon/Atlantic
- Producer: Brian Culbertson; Paul Brown; Tim Gant

Brian Culbertson chronology
After Hours (1996)	Secrets (1997)	Somethin' Bout Love (1999)

Professional ratings
Review scores
Source	Rating
AllMusic	3/5 stars
Jazz Times	(favourable)

Secrets is the fourth studio album by keyboardist Brian Culbertson released in 1997 on Mesa/Bluemoon/Atlantic Records. The album reached No. 15 on the Billboard Contemporary Jazz Albums chart and No. 20 on the Billboard Top Jazz Albums chart.

== Track listing ==
No.	Title	Writer(s)	Length
1.	"So Good"	Brian Culbertson	4:12
2.	"On My Mind"	Brian Culbertson, Steve Finckle	4:29
3.	"Backstreet"	Paul Brown, Brian Culbertson, Tim Redfield	4:02
4.	"Straight to the Heart"	Marcus Miller	3:55
5.	"Secrets"	Brian Culbertson	5:04
6.	"You'll Never Find"	Brian Culbertson, Tim Gant	4:35
7.	"One More Day"	Brian Culbertson	4:47
8.	"You're the One"	Brian Culbertson	6:00
9.	"At the Backroom"	Brian Culbertson	7:55

== Personnel ==
- Brian Culbertson – acoustic piano, keyboards (1, 2, 4–9), drum programming (1, 2, 6–9), additional keyboards (3), synth bass (4, 6–8), trombone (9)
- Tim Redfield – keyboards (3), synth bass (3), drum programming (3)
- Paul Brown – additional keyboards (3), additional programming (3), drum programming (4)
- Tim Gant – keyboards (6), synth bass (6), drum programming (6)
- Ricky Peterson – Hammond B3 organ (7–9)
- Dwight Sills – guitars (1, 2, 7, 8)
- Paul Jackson Jr. – guitars (4)
- Richie Davis – guitars (5, 6), wah-wah guitar (7)
- Jeff Golub – rhythm guitar (9), guitar solo (9)
- Richard Patterson – bass (1, 2, 5, 9)
- Oscar Seaton Jr. – drums (2, 5, 9), hi-hat (7)
- Todd Sucherman – hi-hat (5), cymbal fills (5)
- Lenny Castro – percussion (1, 2, 4, 5, 7, 8), congas (9)
- Marc "M. Doc" Williams – vibraphone (6)
- Steve Finckle – tenor saxophone (1, 2, 5), soprano saxophone (2, 8), additional keyboards (2)
- Gerald Albright – alto saxophone (7)
- Theresa Davis – backing vocals (1, 6, 8)
- Nanette Frank – backing vocals (1, 6, 8), vocal solo (1, 6)
- Diane Madison – backing vocals (1, 8)
- Michelle Buss – backing vocals (5)
- Steve Grissette – backing vocals (5, 6), talking (5)
- Larry King – backing vocals (5)
- Dee Alexander – backing vocals (6)

Music arrangements

- Brian Culbertson – arrangements (1, 2, 4–9)
- Tim Redfield – arrangements (3)
- Paul Brown – arrangements (4)
- Tim Gant – arrangements (6)

== Production ==
- George Nauful – executive producer
- Jim Snowden – executive producer
- Brian Culbertson – producer (1, 2, 5–9)
- Scott Steiner – co-producer for piano and trombone tracks (1–5, 7–9)
- Paul Brown – producer (3, 4)
- Tim Gant – producer (6), co-producer for piano and trombone tracks (6)
- Benjamin Niles – art direction, design
- Creston Funk – photography
- David K. – stylist
- Howard Lowell for Shooting Stars Media Consultants – management
- Thom Santee for Auntie M Creative Consultants – management
- Free World Music – booking

Technical credits

- Stephen Marcussen – mastering at Precision Mastering (Hollywood, California)
- Craig Bauer – recording (1, 2, 5–9), mixing (1, 2, 5–8), piano track recording
- Paul Brown – recording (3, 4), mixing (3, 4)
- Scott Steiner – piano track recording
- Stephen Gaboury – additional recording
- Eddie King – additional recording
- Matt Prock – additional engineer, assistant engineer
- Steve Weeder – additional engineer, mixing (9)
- Steve Johnson – assistant engineer
- Charlie Terr – piano technician
