= Colors of Love (Brian Culbertson album) =

Studio album by Brian Culbertson
- Released: February 14, 2018
- Studio: BCM Studios (Los Angeles, California)
- Genre: Soul music, smooth jazz
- Length: 1:02:57
- Label: BCM Entertainment Inc.
- Producer: Brian Culbertson

Brian Culbertson chronology
Funk! (2016)	Colors of Love (2018)	Winter Stories (2019)

Colors of Love is a studio album by Brian Culbertson released in 2018 on BCM Entertainment Inc. The album peaked at No. 1 on both the US Billboard Top Jazz Albums and Top Contemporary Jazz charts.

== Track listing ==
All songs written by Brian Culbertson.

No.	Title	Length
1.	"Colors of Love"	5:23
2.	"I Want You"	3:54
3.	"Love Transcended"	4:57
4.	"Don't Go"	5:28
5.	"You're Magic"	4:24
6.	"Through the Years"	3:38
7.	"In a Dream"	5:56
8.	"Let's Chill"	5:47
9.	"Desire"	4:36
10.	"Michelle's Theme"	4:03
11.	"In Your Embrace"	3:58
12.	"The Look"	6:41
13.	"All My Heart"	4:11

== Personnel ==
- Brian Culbertson – acoustic piano, keyboards, Fender Rhodes, Wurlitzer electric piano, Hammond B3 organ, synth bass, drum programming, percussion, trumpet
- Peter White – accordion (7)
- Isaiah Sharkey – all guitars

=== Production ===
- Micaela Haley – executive producer
- Brian Culbertson – executive producer, producer, arrangements, engineer, recording, mixing, art direction, design, wardrobe stylist
- Bob Horn – mixing
- Gene Grimaldi – mastering at Oasis Mastering (Burbank, California)
- Joshua Younger – piano technician
- Robert Beatty – art layout and preparation
- Daniel Ray – photography
- Merrilee McLain – hair stylist
- David Britz and Luke Pierce for WORKS Entertainment – management
