= Soleil Moon =

American adult contemporary band

- Origin: Chicago, Illinois
- Genres: Pop, Rock, Jazz, Adult Contemporary
- Years active: 1999–present
- Label: MFO Records
- Members: Larry King; John Blasucci

Soleil Moon is an adult contemporary band founded in 1999 by musicians Larry King and John Blasucci. They have released the studio albums Worlds Apart (2000) and On The Way to Everything (2011). The songs are chiefly co-written by King and Blasucci, and the band's recording sessions have included groups and notable musicians such as the London Symphony Orchestra, guitarist Michael Thompson, jazz musician Paul Jackson Jr., saxophonist Warren Hill, drummer Kenny Aronoff of Lynyrd Skynyrd, and Todd Sucherman of Styx.

== Founding ==
In 1994, long-time rock singer-songwriter Larry King met jazz pianist John Blasucci met, and they quickly began making music together. They eventually formed the band Soleil Moon, writing songs that were a mixture of jazz, pop, rock, and country. On March 2, 1999, they released their first single on React Entertainment, "Worlds Apart," with the B-side "Raining in Ashville." King produced and provided vocals, while Blasucci handled programming and acoustic piano. The tracks were supported in studio by a variety of musicians including Michael Thompson, Peter Hennes, and Tim Morey on guitar, Richard Patterson and Mark Beringer on bass, and Mark Ott and Lenny Castro on drums. Soleil Moon supported the release with a ten-city promotional tour, and "Worlds Apart" became a Top 25 Adult Contemporary hit.

== Worlds Apart (2000) ==
After the success of the single King and Blasucci began writing a full-length album, Worlds Apart. The 12 tracks were produced, co-written, and arranged by the duo, and recording took place at Abbey Road Studios in London, Hinge Studios in Chicago, Echo Park Studios in Bloomington, Indiana, and Capitol Studios in Hollywood. Worlds Apart was released under King's recently formed label MFO Records. Among the studio musicians enlisted to participate in the recording sessions were the London Symphony Orchestra. Many others were also participants in the Larry King Orchestra. Also included were famed session guitarist Michael Thompson, jazz musician Paul Jackson Jr., Warren Hill on saxophone, percussionist Lenny Castro, drummer Kenny Aronoff of Lynyrd Skynyrd and the Smashing Pumpkins, and Todd Sucherman of Styx.

=== Reception ===
Shortly after the release of Worlds Apart, tracks from the album including "Willingly" and "Never Say Goodbye" charted on the Adult Contemporary Top 100.

Reviews for the album were largely positive, with Glory Daze Music saying "the production on Worlds Apart is utterly first class, there is a depth to it that disappears out of sight, the soul and emotion displayed on all the songs is a connection very few musicians (let alone a duo) can expect to achieve in a lifetime." About the style, Musical Discoveries stated "the band's first album blends singer Larry King's epic rock instincts with Blasucci's sleek-flavored approach. A truly unique jazz/pop style has been used by the group in a form never achieved by any other artist."

== Christmas release ==
In November 2000, the group released a rendition of "Have Yourself a Merry Little Christmas," which became the Number One Most Added Christmas Song on the ACQB chart. The song was recorded for fans and was not released commercially until years later. The band reported that in the three months beforehand, the average hit count on their website had gone from 50,000 hits per month to over half a million hits a month.

== On The Way to Everything (2011) ==
On February 1, 2011, Soleil Moon released the 11 track album On The Way To Everything, again through MFO Entertainment Group. The songs had been recorded periodically since 2001, whenever the group had time in the studio in between other projects. Airplay Direct described the album as "Blending bittersweet, melodic ballads, burning hard-rock riffs, percolating R&B grooves, and anything else that happens to suit their fancy, Soleil Moon has made an album about life’s journey, and the conceptual arc is so striking that there’s already been an offer to turn it into a musical."

== Band members ==
Permanent members

- Larry King – lead vocals (1999–present)
- John Blasucci – piano, keyboard (1999–present)

== Discography ==
Singles

- "Worlds Apart" (March 1999)
- "Have Yourself a Merry Little Christmas" (1999)

Albums

- Worlds Apart (2000)
- On The Way to Everything (2011)
- Warrior (2019)
