= Larry King (musician) =

American musician

- Born: August 16, 1966 (age 60)
- Origin: Chicago, Illinois
- Genres: Pop, rock, jazz, adult contemporary
- Occupations: Musician
- Instruments: Vocals
- Years active: 1980–present
- Label: MFO Entertainment
- Website: MFO Entertainment Group; Sound Bank Recording Studio; Soleil Moon Band; Larry King Orchestra ( Page will play audio when loaded)

Larry King is an American singer-songwriter, music producer, and band leader based in Chicago, Illinois. In the late 1980s King along with guitarist Keith Burnstine (Bluesmind, The Gutones, Mindspool) was the co-founder and lead singer of the Los Angeles progressive rock band Human Factor, and after moving back to Chicago, founded the Larry King Orchestra in 1997. He founded MFO Entertainment Group a year later, and remains as president of the company. In 1999 King and John Blasucci founded Soleil Moon, an adult contemporary band that has since had two studio releases, and involved session musicians such as the London Symphony Orchestra, Kenny Aronoff, Todd Sucherman of Styx, Michael Thompson, Leland Sklar, Vinnie Colaiuta In 2012 Larry collaborated with Michael Thompson and became the new lead singer for the Michael Thompson Band under the Frontiers Records Label based in Italy. Frontiers also picked up the 'Soleil Moon – On The Way To Everything' record for international release in 2013.

== Early life and education ==
Larry King was born and raised in Chicago, Illinois. He was involved in the entertainment industry from a young age, and began working as a child actor in television and radio commercials by age seven. Before the age of 13 he had been featured in 52 commercials, and began singing and writing music at age 12. As a teen he would sing jingles for television and radio by day and at night he'd work with local bands alongside his brother, who was a drummer. He was also active in musical theater, including a stint as Bobby Kennedy in One Shining Moment at Chicago's Drury Lane Theater.

After high school King attended the University of Miami and later the University of Wisconsin–Madison. While attending school he began focusing more on music, and wrote over 100 jingles for local and national advertising campaigns.

== Music career ==
Upon graduating in the late 1980s King moved to Los Angeles, where he and Keith Burnstine formed the band "Human Factor". The group was signed to Caliber Records, an independent record label associated with Warner Brothers Distribution. King wrote music, played keys and performed vocals for the band, which he has described as having a glam rock style with epic pop ballads.

In the early 1990s the Human Factor disbanded and King moved back to Chicago and secured a role as a staff writer and musician for River North Records. He became a session singer and wrote the rock opera Sins of the Father, staged by the Winston-Salem Repertory Company in North Carolina.

=== Larry King Orchestra ===
In 1997 King conceptualized and formed The Larry King Orchestra, a society band in Chicago. The original incarnation featured King on vocals and eleven musicians. The band, now a 22-piece, has developed a reputation as a high-end private event entertainment power house. LKO has been featured in CS Brides multiple times and many other trade publications. On New Years 2010 the band performed at the wedding of NASCAR driver Kyle Busch and Samantha Sarcinella in Chicago and was featured in People Magazine and on the Style Network.

=== MFO Entertainment Group ===
In 1998, Larry created MFO Entertainment Group, under which Soleil Moon achieved great success competing with artists such as Celine Dion, Michael Bolton and Toni Braxton on the Adult Contemporary radio charts. The band featured prominently in the Top 40 with their last 3 releases and two of their songs, Willingly and Never Say Goodbye, were featured on the Adult Contemporary Top 2000 Tracks.

MFO Entertainment Group provides a multitude of entertainment options. From Weddings, Corporate Parties, Classical String Ensembles, Electronic Dance Parties, Jazz Ensembles and Opera with the Larry King Orchestra, Ron Bedal Orchestra, and Chris Forte Band. MFO also books headliners as well as manages and provides backline for private functions around the world.

=== Soleil Moon ===
In 1994 King met and befriended jazz musician John Blasucci. They quickly began making music together, eventually forming the band Soleil Moon. On March 2, 1999 they released their first single "World's Apart" under MFO Entertainment, with King providing vocals. They supported the release with a ten-city promotional tour, and "World's Apart" became a Top 40 Adult Contemporary hit.

Worlds Apart (2000)

After the single's success King and Blasucci began writing a full-length album. Among the studio musicians enlisted to participate in the project were the London Symphony Orchestra, session guitarist Michael Thompson, Paul Jackson, Jr., saxophonist Warren Hill, percussionist Lenny Castro, drummer Kenny Aronoff of John Cougar Mellencamp, and Todd Sucherman of Styx. Many others were also participants in the Larry King Orchestra. Worlds Apart was released on March 7, 2000 under King's label MFO Records. Various tracks from the album including "Willingly" and "Never Say Goodbye" charted on the Adult Contemporary Top 100, peaking at #17 and #22 respectively.

On The Way to Everything (2011–2012)

On February 1, 2011, Soleil Moon released the studio album On The Way To Everything through MFO Entertainment Group. The songs were recorded periodically since 2001, whenever King and other members found time between other projects. A review stated the album blended "bittersweet, melodic ballads, burning hard-rock riffs, percolating R&B grooves, and anything else that happens to suit their fancy, Soleil Moon has made an album about life's journey, and the conceptual arc is so striking that there's already been an offer to turn it into a musical." In 2012 "On The Way To Everything" was re-released through Frontiers Records, an Italian record label founded in 1996 by Serafino Perugino and is based in Naples, Italy. The Frontiers' release of "On The Way To Everything" has all of the original songs plus a few favorites from the "World's Apart" record.

=== Michael Thompson Band – Future Past ===
Released 2012: Frontiers Records

- Michael Thompson – Guitars & Keys
- Larry King – Vocals
- Khari Parker – Drums
- Alan Berliant – Bass

Guest Performers

- John Blasucci – Keys Official Website
- Dave Hiltebrand – Bass – When You Love Someone, Beautiful Mystery, Future Past, Here I Am & Break Me Down
- Matt Walker – Drums – High Times
- Sahara Thompson – Background Vocals – Can't Miss
- J.P. Delaire – Keys, Background Vocals, Sax – Can't Miss

Produced By
Larry King & Michael Thompson

== Discography ==
Singles
Year	Artist/Band	Song	Link
1998	Soliel Moon	Worlds Apart	Soundcloud
2000	Soleil Moon	Have Yourself a Merry Little Christmas	Listen
2000	Soleil Moon	Willingly	Listen
2000	Soleil Moon	Never Say Goodbye	Listen
2000	Soleil Moon	I'd Die For You	Music Video ( Page will play audio when loaded)
2001	Soleil Moon	Calling on the World	Listen
2008	Haley Pharo	Reach Out	Music Video ( Page will play audio when loaded)
2011	Emma Rose and The Band	Every Girl Needs A Hero	Music Video ( Page will play audio when loaded)
2011	Georgia Rose	Through The Eyes	Music Video ( Page will play audio when loaded)
2012	Georgia Rose	Don't Care	Music Video ( Page will play audio when loaded)
2012	Georgia Rose	Never Gonna Make Me Cry	Music Video ( Page will play audio when loaded)
2012	Soleil Moon	History Repeats It's Pages	Music Video ( Page will play audio when loaded)
2012	Soleil Moon	On The Way To Everything	Listen
2012	Soleil Moon	Blackbird	Listen
2012	Soleil Moon	Goodnight Irene	Listen
2012	Soleil Moon	Freedom	Listen
2012	Soleil Moon	Burn	Listen
2012	Soleil Moon	Down	Listen
2012	Soleil Moon	Colorado	Listen
2012	Soleil Moon	Move On	Listen
2012	Soleil Moon	Ohio	Listen
2012	Soleil Moon	Calling on the World	Listen
2012	Michael Thompson Band	Here I Am	Music Video ( Page will play audio when loaded)
2012	Michael Thompson Band	Future Past	Music Video ( Page will play audio when loaded)
2012	Michael Thompson Band	High Times	Music Video ( Page will play audio when loaded)
2012	Michael Thompson Band	Beautiful Mystery	Music Video ( Page will play audio when loaded)
2012	Michael Thompson Band	Fight For Your Life	Music Video ( Page will play audio when loaded)
2012	Michael Thompson Band	Can't Miss	Music Video ( Page will play audio when loaded)
2012	Michael Thompson Band	Gypsy Road	Music Video ( Page will play audio when loaded)
2013	Michael Thompson Band	When You Love Someone	Music Video ( Page will play audio when loaded)
2013	Soleil Moon	On The Way To Everything	Music Video ( Page will play audio when loaded)
2013	Molly Hunt	Terror in Disguise	
2014	Jennifer Jasons	Creatures of Autumn	Listen
2014	Jennifer Jasons	Raven	Listen
2014	Kanisha K	Bring Me Home	Listen ( Page will play audio when loaded)
2014	Kanisha K	Bring Me Home (Razor & Guido Dance Remix)	Listen ( Page will play audio when loaded)

Albums

- 1997: The Chalice
- 2000: Worlds Apart
- 2008: Verbal Crush – Antoinette AllMusic.com
- 2010: A Circle of Firsts – E. Faye Butler
- 2011: Never Forget – Emily
- 2011: On The Way to Everything
- 2012: On The Way to Everything (Frontiers Records Release)
- 2012: Future Past – Michael Thompson Band
- 2014: Bring Me Home – Kanisha K
- 2014: The Closer I Get To You (Classic Love Songs) – Mark Smith & Opal Staples

Production

- Soleil Moon
- Michael Thompson Band
- Antoinette
- E. Faye Butler
- Kanisha K
- Emily
- Emma Rose
- Molly Hunt
- Emily Tumen
- Jennifer Jasons
- Mark Smith & Opal Staples
- Aleem Khalid

Rock operas

- 1995: Sins of the Fathers
