= Body of Soul =

Studio album by Alfonzo Blackwell
- Released: 1998
- Genre: Jazz
- Label: Street Life
- Producer: Alfonzo Blackwell

Alfonzo Blackwell chronology
Alfonzo Blackwell (1996)	Body of Soul (1998)	The Time Is Now (2000)

Professional ratings
Review scores
Source	Rating

Body of Soul is the third studio album by Alfonzo Blackwell released in 1998. The album peaked at No. 14 on the Billboard Contemporary Jazz Albums chart and No. 19 on the Billboard Jazz Albums chart.

== Overview ==
Artists such as Preston Glass and Sheldon Reynolds appeared upon the album.
