= It's On Tonight =

Studio album by Brian Culbertson
- Released: July 26, 2005
- Studio: BCM Studios (Los Angeles, California)
- Genre: Jazz
- Length: 58:07
- Label: GRP
- Producer: Brian Culbertson; Stephen Lu

Brian Culbertson chronology
Come On Up (2003)	It's On Tonight (2005)	A Soulful Christmas (2006)

Professional ratings
Review scores
Source	Rating
AllMusic	2.5/5 stars

It's On Tonight is the eighth studio album by American keyboardist Brian Culbertson. It was released by GRP Records on July 26, 2005. The album reached the top of the US Billboard Contemporary Jazz Albums chart and number two on the Billboard Top Jazz Albums chart.

== Overview ==
Artists such as Kirk Whalum, Chris Botti, Boney James, Patti Austin, Will Downing and Marc Nelson are featured on the album.

== Track listing ==
No.	Title	Writer(s)	Length
1.	"Let's Get Started"	Brian Culbertson	3:53
2.	"Hookin' Up"	Culbertson; Stephen Lu	4:43
3.	"It's On Tonight" (featuring Will Downing)	Culbertson; Lu; Marc Nelson	5:09
4.	"Sensuality"	Culbertson	6:32
5.	"The Way You Feel" (featuring Boney James)	Culbertson; Lu	4:52
6.	"Forbidden Love"	Culbertson	4:34
7.	"Dreaming of You"	Culbertson	3:55
8.	"Wear It Out" (featuring Marc Nelson)	Culbertson; Lu; Nelson	4:51
9.	"Secret Affair" (featuring Chris Botti)	Culbertson; Lu	5:38
10.	"Touch Me"	Culbertson	5:46
11.	"Love Will Never Let You Down" (featuring Patti Austin and Kirk Whalum)	Culbertson; Lu; Nelson	5:55
12.	"Reflections"	Culbertson	2:30

== Personnel ==
Musicians

- Brian Culbertson – acoustic piano, keyboards (1–10, 12), bass (1), drum programming (1–7, 9, 10), trombone (1, 2, 4, 6), trumpet (1, 2, 4, 6), synth bass (3–5, 7, 10), percussion (6, 10), handclaps (6)
- Stephen Lu – keyboards (2–5, 8, 9), drum programming (2–5, 8, 11), synth bass (3–5, 8)
- Ricky Peterson – Hammond B3 organ (2, 4–6, 8, 10, 11)
- Greg Phillinganes – Fender Rhodes (11)
- Tony Maiden – wah guitar (1, 6)
- Micah Otano – acoustic guitar (1), handclaps (6)
- Tim Stewart – acoustic nylon-string guitar (2), electric guitar (2, 3), steel-string acoustic guitar (3), guitars (4, 5, 8)
- Paul Jackson Jr. – electric guitar (6), guitars (11)
- Michael Thompson – acoustic guitar (7), electric guitar (7)
- Jorge Evans – guitars (9, 10)
- Alex Al – bass (2, 6, 9)
- Marcus Miller – bass (11)
- Scott Steiner – handclaps (6)
- Eric Darius – tenor saxophone (1)
- Boney James – tenor saxophone (5)
- Kirk Whalum – tenor saxophone (11)
- Chris Botti – trumpet (9)
- Michelle Culbertson – violin (7)

Vocalists

- Michelle Culbertson – vocal FX (1)
- Ledisi – vocals (1)
- Will Downing – lead vocals (3)
- Marc Nelson – backing vocals (3, 11), vocals (8)
- Brian Culbertson – backing vocals (6), vocal FX (6)
- Patti Austin – lead vocals (11), backing vocals (11)

== Production ==
- Bud Harner – executive producer
- Brian Culbertson – producer, arrangements, all horn arrangements
- Stephen Lu – producer (2–5, 8, 9, 11), arrangements (2–5, 8, 9, 11)
- Scott Steiner – co-producer for piano tracks
- Marc Nelson – all BGV arrangements
- Theodora Kuslan – release coordinator
- Kelly Pratt – release coordinator
- Hollis King – art direction
- Isabelle Wong – design
- Lisa Peardon – photography
- David K. – wardrobe stylist
- Merrilee McLain – hair stylist
- Chantal Moore – grooming
- Thom Santee – management

Technical credits

- Bernie Grundman – mastering at Bernie Grundman Mastering (Hollywood, California)
- Brian Culbertson – recording
- Peter Mokran – mixing
- Micah Otano – recording assistant, mix assistant, additional engineer
- Stephen Lu – additional engineer
- Scott Steiner – additional engineer, piano track engineer
- Dean Garten – piano technician
- James Karukas – piano tuner

== Charts ==
Chart (2005)	Peak position
US Billboard 200	161
US Top Contemporary Jazz Albums (Billboard)	1
US Top Jazz Albums (Billboard)	2
