= Dreams (Brian Culbertson album) =

Studio album by Brian Culbertson
- Released: June 12, 2012
- Studio: BCM Studios (Los Angeles, California); Cocoa-Butt Studios (Culver City, California); Brandon Henderson's Home Studio (Philadelphia, Pennsylvania); Frogland Studio (Madrid, Spain)
- Genre: Soul music, smooth jazz
- Length: 50:32
- Label: GRP
- Producer: Brian Culbertson

Brian Culbertson chronology
XII (2010)	Dreams (2012)	Another Long Night Out (2014)

Dreams is a studio album by Brian Culbertson released in 2012 by GRP Records. The album peaked at number one on both the Billboard Top Jazz Albums and Top Contemporary Jazz Albums charts.

== Overview ==
Artists such as Ray Parker Jr. and Stokley Williams of Mint Condition are featured on the album.

== Singles ==
"Your Smile" peaked at No. 1 and "Later Tonight" at No. 3 on the Billboard Smooth Jazz Airplay chart. What's more "Still Here" peaked at No. 15 and "You're My Music" at No. 23 on the Billboard Adult R&B Airplay chart.

== Critical reception ==
Professional ratings
Review scores
Source	Rating
AllMusic	3/5 stars

With a 3 out of 5 star rating, Thom Jurek of AllMusic commented, "On Dreams, Brian Culbertson attempts to dig further into the vein he opened on 2010's XII, where he seamlessly married adult-oriented R&B to contemporary jazz. In fact, Dreams feels like a bookend of sorts."

== Track listing ==
Track No.	Title	Writer(s)	Length
1	"Later Tonight"	Brian Culbertson	04:55
2	"No Limits"	Brian Culbertson, Taj Jackson, Rex Rideout	04:53
3	"Your Smile"	Brian Culbertson	04:41
4	"Still Here"	Brian Culbertson, Vivian Green, Rex Rideout	04:19
5	"In The City"	Brian Culbertson	05:22
6	"Your My Music"	Brian Culbertson, Taj Jackson	04:46
7	"Dreams"	Brian Culbertson	03:42
8	"Madelena"	Brian Culbertson	04:37
9	"Lights Off"	Brian Culbertson	07:08
10	"The Journey"	Brian Culbertson	06:09

== Personnel ==
- Brian Culbertson – acoustic piano, keyboards, Hammond B3 organ (1, 5–7, 9), drum programming, percussion (1, 2, 7–10), trombone (1, 5, 9), synth bass (2, 3, 8–10), bass (6), finger snaps (7)
- Rex Rideout – keyboards (2), drum programming (2), synth bass (4)
- Rob Bacon – guitars (1, 6)
- John "Jubu" Smith – guitars (2, 5, 9)
- Michael Thompson – acoustic guitar (3, 7), electric guitar (3, 7), EBow guitar (3, 7)
- Ray Parker Jr. – rhythm guitar (3)
- Marc Antoine – acoustic guitar (8)
- Alex Al – bass (1, 5, 7)
- Eric Marienthal – alto saxophone (1), tenor saxophone (1, 5, 9), bass clarinet (5)
- Michael Stever – flugelhorn (1, 5), horn arrangements (1, 5, 9), trumpet (9)
- Stokley Williams – vocals (2)
- Taj Jackson – additional backing vocals (2)
- Vivian Green – vocals (4)
- Noel Gourdin – vocals (6)

== Production ==
- Dahlia Ambach Caplin – executive producer
- Michelle Culbertson – executive producer
- Brian Culbertson – executive producer, producer, arrangements
- Scott Steiner – piano and B3 organ track producer
- Rex Rideout – co-arrangements (2, 4)
- Taj Jackson – co-producer for vocals (6)
- Evelyn Morgan – A&R administrator
- JoAnn Tominaga – project coordinator
- Vartan Kurjian – art direction
- Sachico Asano – artwork design
- Daniel Ray – photography
- Lloyd Johnson – photography assistant
- Teena Collins – wardrobe stylist
- Merrilee McLain – hair stylist
- Jeanne Townsend – make-up artist
- David Britz and Garry C. Kief for Stiletto Entertainment – management

Technical credits

- Gene Grimaldi – mastering at Oasis Mastering (Burbank, California)
- Brian Culbertson – engineer
- Bob Horn – mixing, horn engineer (1, 5, 9)
- Scott Steiner – piano track engineer (1, 3, 5–10), B3 organ track engineer (1, 5–7, 9)
- Rex Rideout – piano track engineer (2, 4)
- Michael Thompson – additional recording (3, 7)
- Marc Antoine – additional recording (8)
- Lena Lundal – digital technician
- Ron Tuttle – piano technician

== Charts ==
Chart (2012)	Peak position
US Top Jazz Albums (Billboard)	1
US Top Contemporary Jazz Albums (Billboard)	1
US Billboard 200	105
