= XX (Brian Culbertson album) =

Studio album by Brian Culbertson
- Released: April 10, 2020
- Genre: Soul music, smooth jazz
- Length: 56:44
- Label: BCM Entertainment Inc.
- Producer: Brian Culbertson

Brian Culbertson chronology
Winter Stories (2020)	XX (2020)	Music From The Hang (2020)

XX is a studio album by Brian Culbertson released in 2020 on BCM Entertainment Inc. The album peaked at No. 13 on the US Billboard Top Jazz Albums chart and No. 3 on the US Billboard Top Contemporary Jazz chart.

== Reception ==
The album received mostly positive reviews from critics.

== Track listing ==
No.	Title	Writer(s)	Length
1.	"Get Up!"	Brian Culbertson	5:06
2.	"Dance Like This"	Brian Culbertson	4:41
3.	"The Hangout"	Brian Culbertson, Rishon Odel Northington	6:20
4.	"Prelude to More Than Thankful"	Brian Culbertson	0:41
5.	"More Than Thankful"	Brian Culbertson, Nicholas Cole, Michael Jeffries, Dana Johnson	4:45
6.	"It's a Love Thing"	Brian Culbertson	6:24
7.	"Time Flies"	Brian Culbertson	4:44
8.	"Sexi Love"	Brian Culbertson	6:16
9.	"Keep Movin`"	Brian Culbertson, Marcus Anderson, Rishon Odel Northington, Darnell "Showcase" Taylor	5:19
10.	"The Truth"	Brian Culbertson, Noel Gourdin	6:24
11.	"Intro to Looking Back"	Brian Culbertson	0:46
12.	"Looking Back"	Brian Culbertson	5:18

== Personnel ==
- Brian Culbertson – vocals (1, 2, 8), acoustic piano, keyboards (1, 2, 4–10, 12), bass (1, 2, 7), drum programming (1, 2, 6–8), trombone (1–5, 9, 10), leader (1, 7), clavinet (2–5, 8), woodblock (2), organ (3–5, 7, 9), bass drum (6), synthesizers (7), shaker (7), finger snaps (7, 12), tambourine (10), bass trombone (10)
- Paul Jackson Jr. – right guitar (1), stereo 80's guitar (1)
- Ray Parker Jr. – left guitar (1), rhythm 80's guitar (1)
- Alex Al – bass (1)
- Khari Parker – snare drum (1)
- Lenny Castro – congas (1), timbales (1)
- Marcus Anderson – tenor saxophone (1)
- Marqueal Jordan – saxophones (1)
- Michael Stever – trumpet (1)
