= Sheldon Reynolds (guitarist) =

American musician (1959–2023)

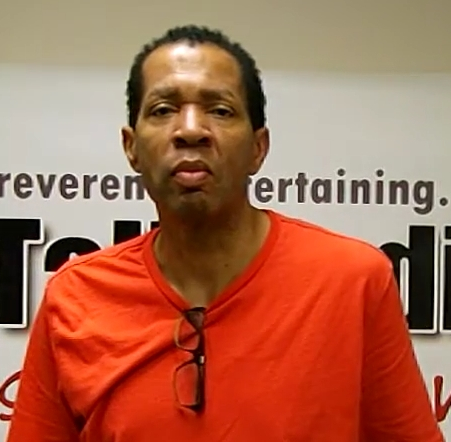
- Reynolds in 2016

Background information
- Born: Sheldon Maurice Reynolds; September 13, 1959; Cincinnati, Ohio, U.S.
- Died: May 23, 2023 (aged 63) Los Angeles, California, U.S.
- Genres: R&B, funk, smooth jazz
- Occupations: Singer, songwriter, guitarist, producer
- Instruments: Guitar, vocals, keyboards
- Years active: 1984–2023
- Formerly of: Sun, Commodores, Earth, Wind & Fire, Maurice White, Brian Culbertson

Sheldon Maurice Reynolds (September 13, 1959 – May 23, 2023) was an American guitarist, singer, and songwriter. He was a member of bands Sun, The Commodores and Earth, Wind & Fire.

== Career ==
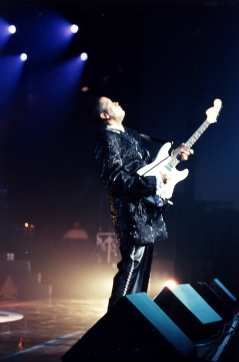
Sheldon Reynolds in 2002

Born in Cincinnati, Ohio, Reynolds began playing the guitar when he was eight years old, and by the age of 12 was considered a prodigy. He graduated from the University of Cincinnati. Reynolds toured with singer Millie Jackson. Reynolds later joined R&B band Sun, with whom he recorded three albums. During 1983 he became a member of The Commodores. With the Commodores he sang on their 1985 LP Nightshift and then played on their 1986 album United. Altogether he featured with the band for four years.

Reynolds then joined Earth, Wind & Fire (EWF) in the roles of lead guitarist and co-vocalist. He went on to play on EWF's LPs Touch The World (1987), The Best of Earth, Wind & Fire, Vol. 2 (1988), Heritage (1990), Millennium (1993) and In The Name of Love (1997). With EWF he earned a Grammy Award nomination in 1994 in the category of Best R&B Performance by a Duo or Group with Vocals for the song "Sunday Morning". As a member of the band, Reynolds was inducted into the NAACP Image Award Hall of Fame.

=== Solo work ===
Reynolds played on Maurice White's 1985 self-titled album and Philip Bailey's 1989 LP Family Affair. He later guested on Barbara Weathers's 1990 self-titled album, Smokey Robinson's 1990 LP Love, Smokey and Joey Lawrence's 1993 self-titled album. Reynolds also performed on 4Him's 1994 LP The Ride and Take 6's 1996 album Brothers.

Reynolds later appeared on jazz group Urban Knights 1997 LP Urban Knights II and on Alfonzo Blackwell's 1998 album Body of Soul.

Reynolds teamed up with two former Band of Gypsys members, Buddy Miles and Billy Cox to contribute to The Band of Gypsys Return album that was released in 2006.

Reynolds also featured on Chicago's 2008 LP Chicago XXXII: Stone of Sisyphus, Brian Culbertson's 2008 album Bringing Back The Funk and on Culbertson's 2010 release XII.

== Personal life and death ==
Reynolds was a contributing editor to the magazine Astronomy. He also had a talk show on Twilight Radio.

Reynolds had two children of his own; Jade Williams (daughter) and Brice Bates (son).

Reynolds was at one time married to Janie Hendrix, the adopted sister of Jimi Hendrix.

Reynolds died on May 23, 2023, at the age of 63.
