= Bringing Back the Funk =

Studio album by Brian Culbertson
- Released: April 29, 2008
- Studio: BCM Studios (Los Angeles, California); Megaplex Studio (North Hollywood, California); Glenwood Place Studios (Burbank, California); Angel Sound Studio (Inglewood, California); Master Mix Studios and Workhouse Studios (Minneapolis, Minnesota); Big Kahuna Studios (St. Paul, Minnesota); Bootzilla Re-Hab Center (Cincinnati, Ohio)
- Genre: Funk, smooth jazz
- Length: 46:54
- Label: GRP Records
- Producer: Brian Culbertson

Brian Culbertson chronology
A Soulful Christmas (2006)	Bringing Back the Funk (2008)	XII (2010)

Professional ratings
Review scores
Source	Rating
AllMusic	4.5/5 stars
People	(favourable)
Jazz Times	(favorable)

Bringing Back the Funk is the tenth studio album by Brian Culbertson released in 2008 on GRP Records. The album reached No. 3 on the Billboard Jazz Albums chart and No. 15 on the Billboard Top R&B/Hip Hop Albums chart.

== Overview ==
Bringing Back the Funk was executively produced by Maurice White.

Artists who feature on the album include Bootsy Collins, Ray Parker Jr., Musiq Soulchild, Larry Dunn, Ledisi, Maceo Parker, Larry Graham, Sheldon Reynolds and Gerald Albright.

== Singles ==
The song "Always Remember" reached No. 1 on the Billboard Smooth Jazz Songs chart.

== Track listing ==
No.	Title	Writer(s)	Length
1.	"Funkin' Like My Father" (featuring Bootsy Collins)	Bootsy Collins, Brian Culbertson, Candice Cheatham, Keith Cheatham, Donald Moore, Sheldon Reynolds, Pete Roberts, Zion Roberts	5:15
2.	"Always Remember"	Culbertson, Reynolds	4:22
3.	"Hollywood Swinging" (featuring Gerald Albright and Musiq Soulchild)	Robert "Kool" Bell, Ronald Bell, George Brown, Robert "Spike" Mickens, Claydes Smith	4:09
4.	"The House of Music" (featuring Larry Graham and Ronnie Laws)	Culbertson, Larry Graham	4:50
5.	"You Got to Funkifize" (featuring Chance Howard)	Emilio Castillo, Stephen "Doc" Kupka	5:26
6.	"The Groove"	Culbertson, Larry Dunn	4:41
7.	"The World Keeps Going Around" (featuring Ledisi)	Bill Withers	4:26
8.	"Excuse Me... What's Your Name?"	Culbertson, Maurice Fitzgerald, Chris Miskell	1:59
9.	"Voices Inside (Everything Is Everything)" (featuring David T. Walker and Eddie Miller)	Richard Evans, Ric Powell, Phil Upchurch	6:02
10.	"Let's Stay in Tonight"	Culbertson, Reynolds, Maurice White	5:29

== Performers ==
- Brian Culbertson – acoustic piano (1–7, 9, 10), clavinet (1, 2), Minimoog (1, 6), trombone solo (1), keyboards (2–4, 6–8, 10), trombone (2–10), Wurlitzer electric piano (3), distorted bass (3), Fender Rhodes (4, 8), percussion (4), muted trumpet (6), trumpet (8)
- Eddie Miller – keyboards (1, 3), Wurlitzer electric piano (5, 7), backing vocals (5), Fender Rhodes (9), lead vocals (9)
- Bernie Worrell – keyboards (1)
- Ricky Peterson – Hammond B3 organ (1–7, 9, 10)
- Larry Dunn – Fender Rhodes (2, 6, 10), Minimoog (6)
- Monte Neuble – talk box (5), wah synthesizer (7)
- Phelps "Catfish" Collins –guitars (1)
- Sheldon Reynolds – guitars (1–3, 5–7, 9, 10), vocals (2, 4, 10), additional guitars (4), backing vocals (5)
- Ron Jennings – guitar solo (1)
- Paul Jackson, Jr. – guitars (2, 3, 10)
- Ray Parker Jr. – guitars (2–4, 6, 7, 10), vocals (4), acoustic guitar (8), electric guitar (8)
- Sonny Thompson – guitars (4)
- Tony Maiden – rhythm guitar (5), guitar solo (5)
- David T. Walker – rhythm guitar (9), guitar solo (9)
- Chance Howard – synth bass (1, 3), clavinet (4, 5, 9), lead vocals (5), backing vocals (5)
- Bobby Watson – bass (1, 9)
- Bootsy Collins – space bass (1), vocals (1)
- Maurice Fitzgerald – bass (2, 8, 10)
- Sam Sims – slap bass (3)
- Larry Graham – bass (4)
- Derrick "D.O.A." Allen – bass (5)
- Morris Pleasure – bass (6), synth bass (6, 10)
- Rhonda Smith – bass (7)
- Michael Bland – drums (1, 4, 9)
- Chris Miskel – drums (2, 8)
- Oscar Seaton Jr. – drums (3, 5)
- Sonny Emory – drums (6, 10)
- Cora Coleman Dunham – drums (7)
- Lenny Castro – percussion (1–3, 5, 6, 9, 10)
- Perri (Carol, Darlene, Lori and Sharon Perry) – tambourines (5), gospel vocals (5), backing vocals (9)
- Maceo Parker – alto saxophone (1)
- Eric Marienthal – alto saxophone (1, 3, 5, 7, 9, 10), tenor saxophone (1, 3–7, 9), horn arrangements (3), baritone saxophone (7), bass clarinet (7), clarinet (7), flute (7)
- Tom Scott – baritone saxophone (2, 5, 9), tenor saxophone (2, 5, 9)
- Gerald Albright – alto sax solo (3)
- Ronnie Laws – tenor saxophone (4), tenor sax solo (4)
- Fred Wesley – trombone (1)
- Richard "Kush" Griffith – trumpet (1)
- Greg Adams – trumpet (2, 5, 9), flugelhorn (2, 9), horn arrangements (2, 5, 9)
- Lee Thornburg – trumpet (2, 5, 9), flugelhorn (2, 9)
- Dan Fornero – trumpet (3, 6, 7, 10), flugelhorn (7)
- Bill Meyers – horn arrangements (4, 6, 10)
- Michael Stever – horn arrangements (7)
- Ice Candi – vocals (1)
- Zion Planet 10 – vocals (1)
- DJizzle – rap (1)
- Musiq Soulchild – lead vocals (3), backing vocals (3)
- Bleu McAuley – backing vocals (5)
- David Pack – backing vocals (5)
- Ledisi – lead vocals (7), backing vocals (7)

Party people on "Funkin' Like My Father"

- Michael Bland, Brian Culbertson, Ricky Peterson, Sheldon Reynolds, Bobby Watson and Maurice White

Gang vocals and Handclaps on "Hollywood Swinging"

- Brian Culbertson, Chance Howard, Paul Jackson Jr., Eddie Miller, Ricky Peterson, Sheldon Reynolds, Sam Sims, Musiq Soulchild and Maurice White

Handclaps on "The World Keeps Going Around"

- Cora Coleman Dunham, Brian Culbertson, Eddie Miller, Monte Neuble, Ricky Peterson, Sheldon Reynolds, Rhonda Smith and Maurice White

== Production ==
- Maurice White – executive producer
- David Britz – co-executive producer, A&R direction, management
- Brian Culbertson – co-executive producer, producer, arrangements, liner notes
- Bootsy Collins – co-producer (1)
- Sheldon Reynolds – additional production (1, 2, 4, 10)
- Scott Steiner – co-producer for all piano tracks (1–7, 9, 10)
- Dahlia Ambach Caplin – A&R for Verve
- Mitchell Cohen – A&R for Verve
- Evelyn Morgan – A&R administrator
- JoAnn Tominaga – production coordinator
- Matt Godina – production assistant for Brian Culbertson
- Maytal Rozensher – production assistant for David Britz
- Michael Stever – music preparation, transcriptions
- Steve Cartotto – additional music preparation
- Cameron Mizell – release coordinator
- John Newcott – release coordinator
- Hollis King – art direction
- Sachico Asano – graphic design, background photography
- Beth Herzhaft – photography
- Carol Culbertson – baby photography
- David K. – stylist
- Merrilee McLain – hair stylist
- Garry C. Kief – management
- Stiletto Entertainment – management company

Technical credits

- Bernie Grundman – mastering at Bernie Grundman Mastering (Hollywood, California)
- Bob Horn – mixing, additional recording
- Brian Culbertson – mixing, additional recording
- Maurice White – mixing
- Ed Cherney – basic track recording
- Rob Brill – basic tracking assistant
- Anthony Caruso – basic tracking assistant
- Bootsy Collins – additional recording
- Tobe Donohue – additional recording
- Eddie King – additional recording
- Sheldon Reynolds – additional recording
- Jim Ryberg – additional recording
- Scott Steiner – additional recording
- Tom Tucker – additional recording
- Hiroko Ito – additional recording assistant
- Adam Krinsky – additional recording assistant
- Keith Albright – piano technician
- James Karukas – piano technician
- Ron Tuttle – piano technician

== Charts ==
=== Albums ===
Chart (2008)	Peak position
US Billboard 200	99
US Top Contemporary Jazz Albums (Billboard)	1
US Top Jazz Albums (Billboard)	3
US Top R&B/Hip-Hop Albums (Billboard)	18

=== Singles ===
Year	Title	Chart	Position
2008	"Always Remember"	US Smooth Jazz Songs	1
