= Between Us (Steve Cole album) =

Studio album by Steve Cole
- Released: 2000
- Genre: Jazz
- Length: 41:10
- Label: Warner Bros. Records

Steve Cole chronology
Stay Awhile (1998)	Between Us (2000)	NY LA (2003)

Professional ratings
Review scores
Source	Rating
Allmusic	4.5/5 stars

Between Us is an album by jazz musician Steve Cole, released in 2000. It features two number one hits in "Got it Goin' On" and "From the Start". Cole's cover of the TLC song "Waterfalls" also received rave reviews from Billboard. The album also peaked at number eight on Billboard's Top Contemporary Jazz Albums list.

== Track listing ==
1. "Got It Goin' On" – 4:07
2. "From the Start" – 3:45
3. "Take Me Home to You" – 5:01
4. "So Into You" – 4:03
5. "For Your Love" – 4:25
6. "Interlude" – 1:56
7. "Together Again" – 4:04
8. "Between Us" – 5:21
9. "Waterfalls" – 4:03
10. "Funky D" – 4:25
