= Steve Cole =

American jazz saxophonist and educator

- Born: Steve Finckle; August 17, 1970 (age 56); Chicago, Illinois, U.S.
- Genres: Smooth jazz
- Occupation: Musician
- Instrument: Saxophone
- Years active: 1990s–present
- Labels: Atlantic, Warner Bros., Narada, Artistry
- Website: artistecard.com/stevecole

Steve Cole (born August 17, 1970) is an American smooth jazz saxophonist. He is also a professor/adviser of music business at the University of St. Thomas.

== Early career and education ==
Cole was born in Chicago, Illinois and began to play music at a young age. At first, he trained classically, following in his father's footsteps with the clarinet before switching to the saxophone in high school. While at Northwestern University, he studied classical saxophone before changing his field to economics, eventually earning an MBA from The University of Chicago. After leaving school, Cole returned his focus to music; in particular, jazz.

In 2000 his first solo album Stay Awhile won him the Prism Award for Best New Artist at the Oasis Smooth Jazz Awards. He was also a winner of Chicago Symphony Orchestra's annual young artists competition, allowing him the honour of performing with the orchestra.

In 2001 he hit the charts with the Grover Washington Jr. & Bill Withers classic "Just The Two of Us" from the star-studded tribute album "To Grover, with Love", produced by renowned keyboardist/arranger/producer Jason Miles. The album eventually made # 4 on the Top Contemporary Jazz Albums. The track covered fantastically by Regina Belle, Steve Cole and George Duke is still on the playlist of many jazz radio stations and has become a jazz classic.

== Present career ==
Cole's second album Between Us resulted in a No. 1 hit with the track "Got It Goin' On". Next up, the single "Thursday" from the album, Spin, reached the Top 20 in the radio charts. Spin was well received by critics with a score of 4.5/5.0 at Allmusic – the same score held by albums Between Us and NY LA.

== Discography ==
=== Studio albums ===
- Stay Awhile (Mesa Bluemoon/Atlantic, 1998)
- Between Us (Atlantic, 2000)
- NY LA (Warner Bros., 2003)
- Spin (Narada Jazz, 2005)
- True (Narada Jazz, 2006)
- Moonlight (Artistry Music, 2011)
- Pulse (Artistry Music, 2013)
- Turn It Up (Artistry Music, 2016)
- Gratitude (Artistry Music, 2019)
- Smoke + Mirrors (Artistry Music, 2021)
- Without a Doubt (Artistry Music, 2023)

=== Collaborations ===
- The Sax Pack (Shanachie, 2008) [As member of the group 'The Sax Pack']
- The Pack Is Back (Shanachie, 2009) [As member of the group 'The Sax Pack']
- The Power of 3 (Shanachie, 2015) [As member of the group 'The Sax Pack']

== See also ==
- Boney James
