= Oscar Seaton Jr. =

American drummer

- Born: Chicago, Illinois, United States
- Genres: Gospel, pop, rock, fusion
- Occupation: Drummer
- Instruments: Drums, percussion, bass

Oscar Seaton Jr. (also credited as Oscar Seaton) is an American drummer and a long-time collaborator of Grammy Award-winning jazz pianist and composer Ramsey Lewis. He has also played and toured with other best-selling and award-winning musicians including Lionel Richie, Lee Ritenour, David Sanborn, Boz Scaggs, George Benson, Yolanda Adams and Dianne Reeves, among many others.

== Early life and career ==
Seaton was born in Chicago and took to the drums at an early age by banging on the family's pots and pans. Raised primarily listening to gospel, Seaton realized he had an aptitude for the drums when playing for his church's choir and moved to Los Angeles in 2000. He regularly appears on albums from best-selling artists Ramsey Lewis, Lionel Richie and Lee Ritenhour (as well as Richie). He's also toured with award winners David Sanborn, Boz Scaggs and George Benson. In addition to his collaborations, he also is founding member of the jazz trio date/of/birth, as well as the rock group 13 Curves.

== Credits ==
- Terence Blanchard, Breathless (Drums)
- Will Downing, Euphoria (Drums)
- Aleks Sever, Danger Girl (Drums)
- Chris Standring, Electric Wonderland (Drums)
- Michael Lington, Pure (Drums)
- Lee Ritenour, Rhythm Sessions (Drums)
- Oil Silk, All We Need (Drums)
- Brian Simpson, South Beach (Drums)
- Gregg Karukas, GK (Drums)
- Robert Bradley's Blackwater Surprise, Out of the Wilderness (Drums)
- Euge Groove, Sunday Morning (Drums) (Drums)
- Lionel Richie, Live (Drums)
- Jessy J, Tequila Moon (Drums)
- Oli Silk, The Limit's the Sky (Drums)
- Michael Manson, Up Front (Drums)
- Dianne Reeves, When You Know (Drums)
- Lionel Richie, Live in Paris (Drums)
- Dharma Buds, New World Jazz Order (Drums)
- J. Thompson, Inside World (Drums)
- Michael Manson, Just Feelin' It (Drums)
- Eric Darius, Just Getting Started (Drums)
- Lee Ritenour, Smoke 'N' Mirrors (Drums)
- Lackawanna Blues (Soundtrack) (Drums)
- Lee Ritenour, Overtime (Drums)
- Dwayne Smith, Stories
- Dwayne Smith, This Is Me
- Lionel Richie, Encore (Drums)
- Dan Siegel, Inside Out (Drums)
- Lionel Richie, Just for You (Drums)
- Don Grusin, The Hang (Drums)
- Brazzaville, Welcome to…Brazzaville (Drums)
- Darius Brooks, Your Will [Chordant] (Drums)
- Brian Culbertson, Come on Up (Drums)
- Chris Standring, Groovalicious (Drums)
- David Garfield, Retro Jazz Quintet (Drums)
- Percy Bady, The Percy Bady Experience (Drums)
- Dino Soldo, Thread (Drums)
- Brazzaville, Rouge On Pockmarked Cheeks (Drums)
- Michael Manson, The Bottom Line (Drums)
- Brian Culbertson, Nice & Slow (Drums)
- Steve Cole, Between Us (Drums)
- Jeff Jarvis, Morning Drive (Drums)
- Brian Culbertson, Somethin' Bout Love (Drums)
- Darius Brooks, Your Will [Journey] (Drums)
- Public Announcement, All Work, No Play (Drums)
- Sharie Marie, Essence of Love (Drums)
- Ramsay Lewis, Priceless Jazz (Drums)
- Steve Cole, Stay Awhile (Drums)
- Glenn Kaiser, You Made a Difference in Me (Drums)
- Ramsay Lewis, Dance of the Soul (Drums)
- Brian Culbertson, Secrets (Drums)
- Ramsay Lewis, Between the Keys (Drums)
- Michael Ross, Last Love Letter (Drums)
- Abe Cook & Renewed Spirit, Renewed Spirit (Drums)
- Yolanda Adams, Yolanda Live in Washington (Drums)
- Bill Boris, Hold Back (Drums)
- Yolanda Adams, Save the World (Drums)
- Chicago Mass Choir, Call Him Up (Drums)
- Walt Whitman & the Soul Children of Chicago, This Is the Day (Drums)
- Kaylene Peoples, My Man (Drums)
- George Benson, Guitar Man (Drums)
- Brian Culbertson, XII (Drums)
- Brian Culbertson, Bringing Back the Funk (Drums)
- Michael Manson, Up Front (Drums)
- Brian Culbertson, A Soulful Christmas (Drums)
- Larry Howard, Bright Side Of The Blues (Drums)
- Mansfield, Howard, Kaiser, Into The Night (Drums)
- Carmen Stokes, Sexy Feelin' (Drums)
- Lionel Richie, Still (Live) (Drums)
- Larisa Dolina, Hollywood Mood (Drums)
- Robert Bradley's Blackwater Surprise, Out Of The Wilderness (Drums)
- Dorian Holley, Independent Film (Drums)
- Dorian Holley, Not on Label (Drums)
- James Day, Natural Day (Drums)
- Terence Blanchard Featuring The E-Collective, Breathless (Drums)
- Melvin Lee Davis, Inner City News (Drums)
- Allen Hinds, Monkeys and Slides (Drums)
- David Garfield, Retro Jazz Quintet (Drums)

== TV/movie credits ==
- Talk to Me (music department; drums)
- Inside Man (music department; drums)
- The Early Show, 12 June 2009 "Lionel Richie at the Intrepid Sea Air Space"
- BlacKkKlansman (music department; drums)
