= Brian Culbertson =

American jazz/R&B/funk musician

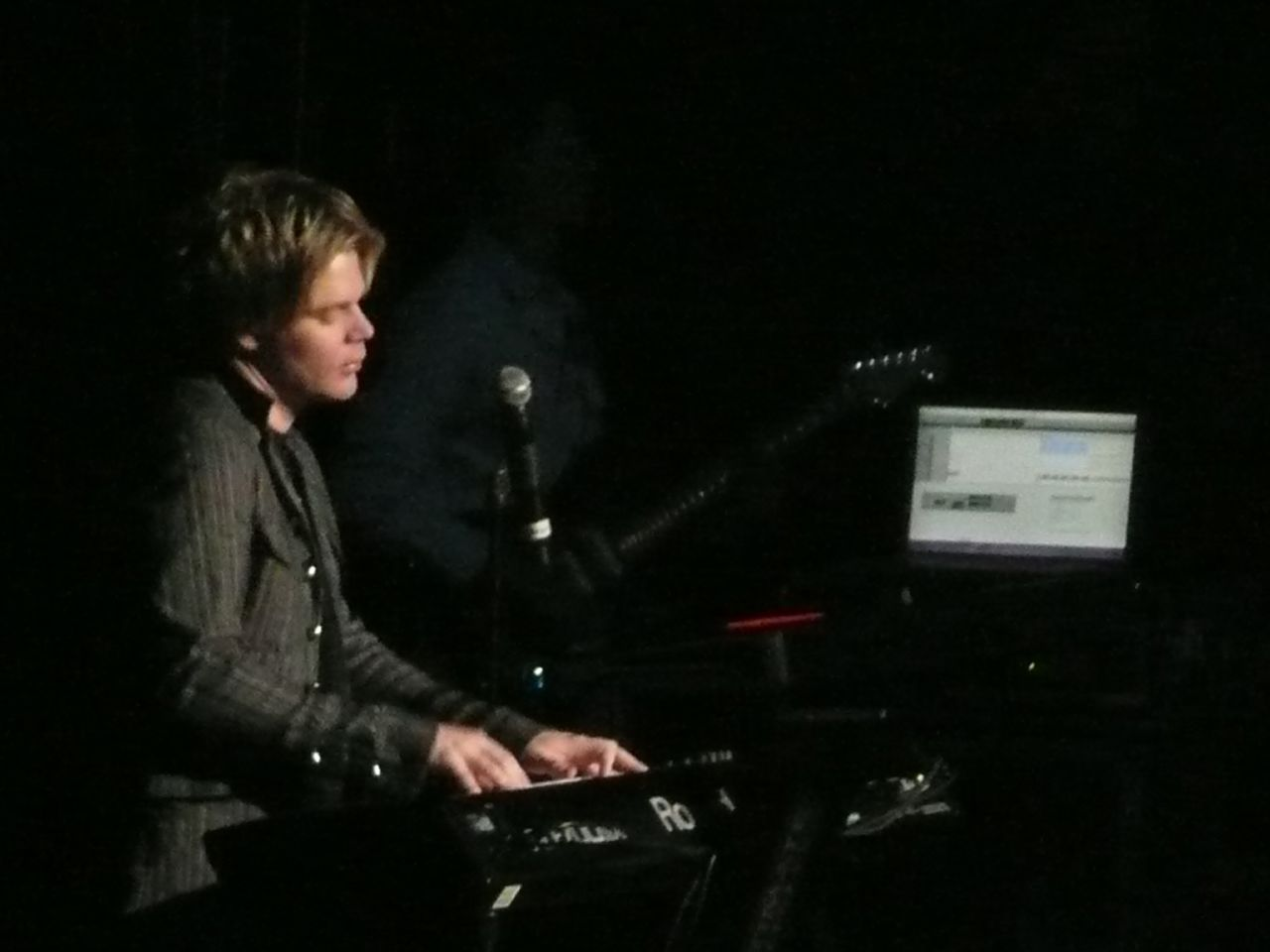
- Culbertson in 2008

Background information
- Born: January 12, 1973 (age 53); Decatur, Illinois, U.S.
- Genres: Smooth jazz; R&B; funk
- Occupation: Musician
- Years active: 1994–present
- Website: brianculbertson.com

Brian Culbertson (born January 12, 1973) is an American smooth jazz/R&B/funk musician and producer. His instruments include the synthesizer, piano and trombone.

== Early life and career ==
Culbertson was born in Decatur, Illinois. As a child, he was musically skilled, having started playing piano at age eight, drums at nine, trombone at ten, bass in seventh grade, and euphonium in high school.

Growing up, he listened to Sting, The Yellowjackets, George Duke, David Foster, Marcus Miller, David Sanborn, Chicago, and Earth, Wind and Fire. He attended and graduated MacArthur High School, where his father was a music teacher. He then moved to Chicago where he attended DePaul University. It was in college that he actually started working on a CD, gathering a group of musicians, recording a demo tape and sending it to the only person he knew in Los Angeles, Bud Harner, who would get him his first record deal.

He is married to Michelle Culbertson, also known by her stage name Micaela Haley, and they live in Chicago. In an interview, Culbertson revealed that he met his wife in college through his first bass player Sharay Reed who had met Michelle at the World of Music Festival in Nashville, Tennessee where they both won awards at the age of 16. Michelle, originally a violinist, won for Best Concert Master and Sharay Reed for Best Soloist. They both were reintroduced to one another at DePaul University two years later. At the end of their Freshman year together Sharay introduced Michelle to Brian telling them that they would make a good match. His wife contributed background vocals on his earlier albums and a feature vocal on his Christmas CD, A Soulful Christmas.

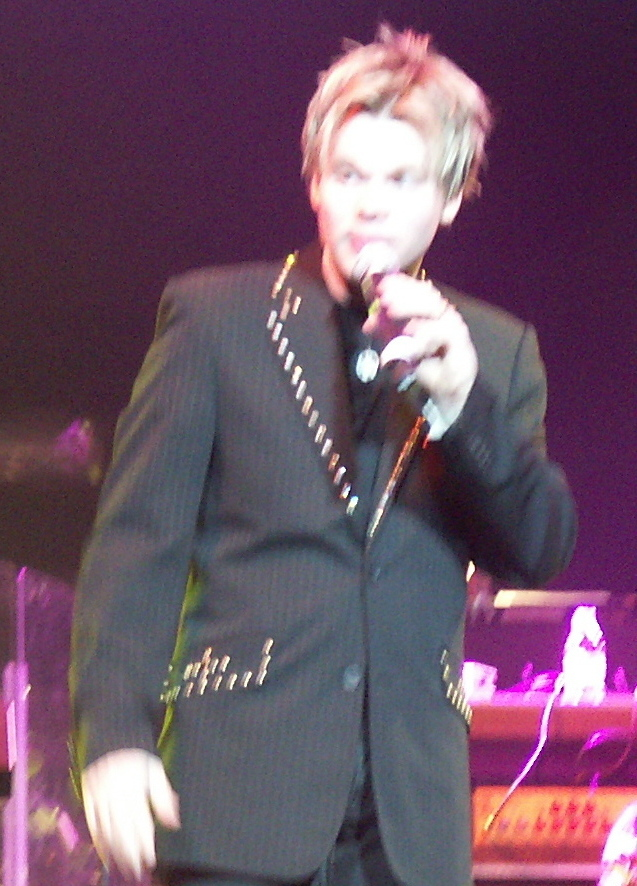
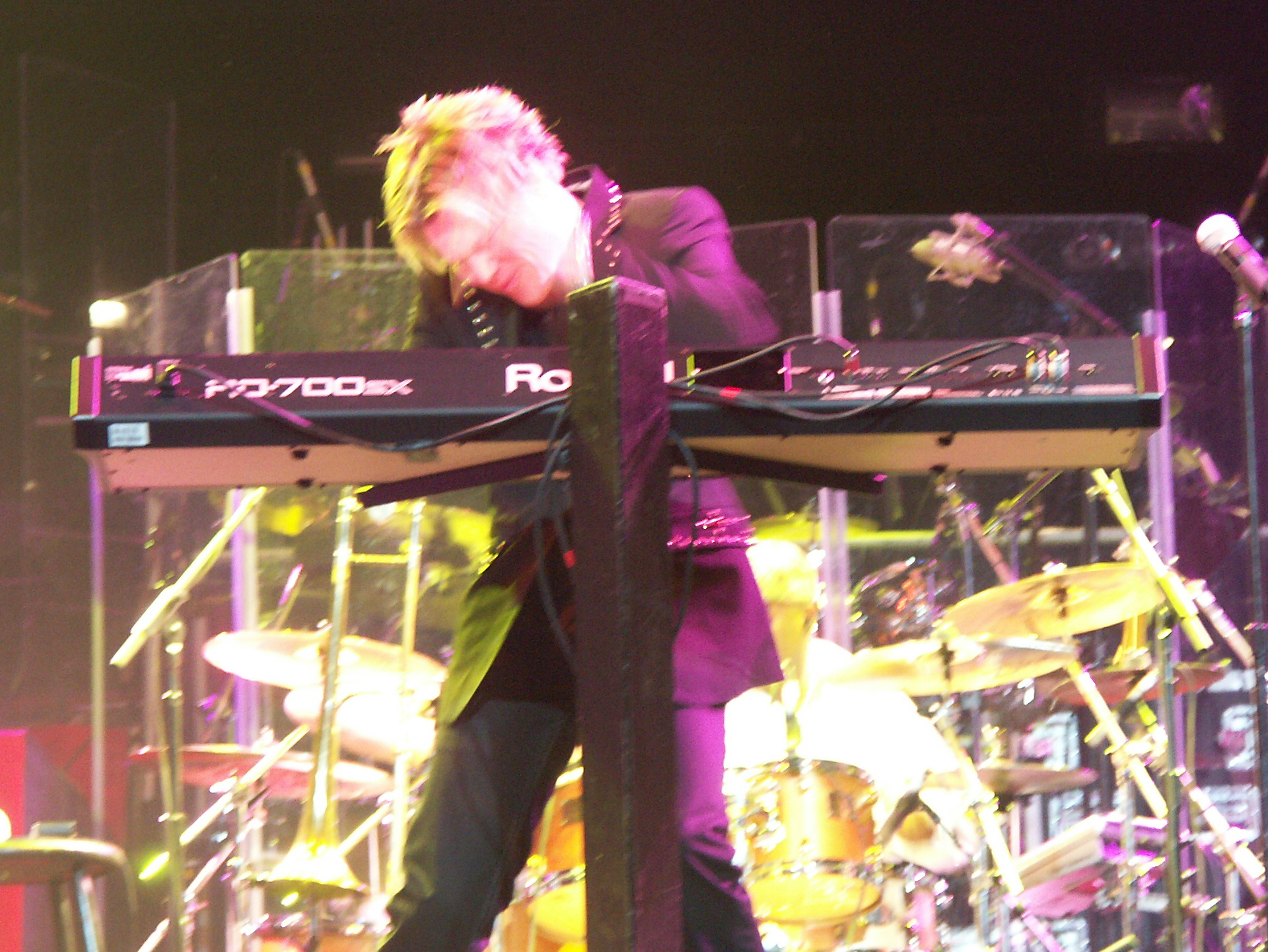
Culbertson live at the Xcel Energy Center in 2008

Culbertson plays Mason & Hamlin pianos and Roland keyboards and has appeared at the NAMM Show.

In 2013, he announced on his blog that he was working on his fourteenth album, the album Another Long Night Out was released on February 25, 2014, and was going to revisit his earlier roots in contemporary jazz. In 2015, he released a second live album "20th Anniversary Tour" while performing at jazz club Yoshi's and, subsequently, he also released a solo piano album for yoga and meditation.

His latest album, released on April 10, 2020, is aptly titled XX (Roman numeral for 20) because it is his 20th solo record. Featuring many guests including Mr. Talkbox, Bootsy Collins, Avery*Sunshine, Marcus Anderson, Everette Harp, Noel Gourdin, Patches Stewart, Ray Parker Jr., Paul Jackson Jr., Jubu Smith, Nicholas Cole, and more. XX features tracks reminiscent of all of Brian's albums: Smooth Jazz, Funk, Gospel, Pop, R&B, and more.

== Napa Valley Jazz Getaway ==
In late 2011, Culbertson announced he would be hosting the first annual Brian Culbertson Napa Valley Jazz Getaway at the Napa Valley Opera House on June 7–10, 2012. Brian along with his wife, Michelle Culbertson (Micaela Haley) began working on the Napa Valley Jazz Getaway together after having spent their 10th wedding anniversary in the region. The 4-day concert event would include live performances by comedian Sinbad, vocalists Oleta Adams and Kenny Lattimore, as well as artists Eric Marienthal, Eric Darius, and David Benoit. In addition to performances, Culbertson curated the weekend's events to include food and wine events at his favorite Napa establishments including: Cindy Pawlcyn's Brassica restaurant, Miner Family Vineyards, Silver Oak Cellars, Caldwell-Snyder Art Gallery, and Silo's Napa.

The inaugural event was a commercial and critical success, selling out within a week of the public announcement of ticket sales. At the 2012 event, Culbertson announced that the event would return for a second year, held June 5–9, 2013. The expanded 5-day 2013 event was held at the Napa Valley Opera House and the Lincoln Theater in addition to several wineries and featured Norman Brown, Kirk Whalum, Rick Braun, Larry Graham & Graham Central Station, Take 6, Ray Parker Jr., Eric Darius, Nick Colionne, Michael Lington, DW3, Cecil Ramirez and returning special guest comedian Sinbad.

== Awards ==
Culbertson has received numerous awards including a 2012 NAACP Image Award nomination for Best Jazz Album; 2012 Soul Train Award nomination for Best Contemporary Jazz Artist; Winning Six (6) 2011 Oasis Smooth Jazz Awards for Best Entertainer, Best Album "XII", Best Song "That's Life", Best Keyboardist, Best Male Artist and Best Collaboration "w/Earl Klugh"; 2010 Canadian Smooth Jazz Award for Best International Artist; 2010 American Smooth Jazz Award for Best Keyboardist; 2005 ASYM All That Jazz Award; 2001 National Smooth Jazz Award for Best Keyboardist.

== Personal life ==
Culbertson has been married to a woman since 1997.

== Discography ==
=== Studio albums ===
Year	Title	Peak chart positions					Record label
Year	Title	US Pop	US R&B	US Jazz	US Con. Jazz	US Internet	Record label
1994	Long Night Out	-	-	-	-	-	Mesa/Bluemoon
1995	Modern Life	-	-	38	-	-	Mesa/Bluemoon
1996	After Hours	-	-	50	-	-	Mesa/Bluemoon
1997	Secrets	-	-	20	15	-	Mesa/Bluemoon
1999	Somethin' Bout Love	-	-	8	3	-	Atlantic
2001	Nice & Slow	-	-	2	1	-	Atlantic
2003	Come On Up	197	36	3	3	-	Warner Bros.
2005	It's On Tonight	161	-	2	1	18	GRP Records
2006	A Soulful Christmas	-	-	17	7	-	GRP
2008	Bringing Back the Funk	99	18	3	1	7	GRP
2010	XII	82	15	2	1	9	GRP
2012	Dreams	105	-	1	1	17	Verve
2014	Another Long Night Out	83	-	1	1	11	BCM Entertainment
2014	Breathe - Piano for Relaxation, Massage, Yoga and Meditation	-	-	-	-	-	BCM Entertainment
2016	Funk!	-	-	3	1	-	BCM Entertainment
2018	Colors of Love	-	-	1	1	-	BCM Entertainment
2019	Winter Stories			3	1		BCM Entertainment
2020	XX			13	3		BCM Entertainment
2020	Music from 'The Hang'						BCM Entertainment
2021	Soundscapes						BCM Entertainment
2021	The Trilogy – Part 1: Red				8		BCM Entertainment
2022	The Trilogy – Part 2: Blue				11		BCM Entertainment
2022	The Trilogy – Part 3: White				8		BCM Entertainment
2023	Sleep						BCM Entertainment
2025	Day Trip						BCM Entertainment

=== Live albums ===
Year	Title	Label	Notes
2009	Live from the Inside	Verve	CD and DVD; chart: No. 14 US Jazz, No. 3 US Contemporary Jazz
2015	Live 20th Anniversary Tour	BCM Entertainment	2 CD; recorded live at Yoshi's (September 11–14, 2014)
2019	Colors of Love Tour – Live in Las Vegas	BCM Entertainment	2 CD and Blu-ray
2025	The Trilogy Tour – Live from Detroit	BCM Entertainment	2 CD and 4K Ultra HD + Blu-ray

=== Singles ===
Year	Title	Peak chart positions				Album
Year	Title	Hot R&B/ Hip-Hop Songs	R&B/ Hip-Hop Airplay	Smooth Jazz Airplay	Adult R&B Airplay	Album
1999	"Get'n Over You"	—	—	—N/a	19	Somethin' Bout Love
2000	"I'm Gonna Miss You"	—	—	—N/a	21	Somethin' Bout Love
2005	"Hookin' Up"	—	—	1	—	It's On Tonight
2006	"Sensuality"	66	65	—	39	It's On Tonight
2006	"Let's Get Started"	—	—	2	—	It's On Tonight
2006	"Deck the Halls"	—	—	16	—	A Soulful Christmas
2007	"Angels We Have Heard on High"	—	—	26	—	A Soulful Christmas
2008	"Always Remember"	—	—	1	—	Bringing Back the Funk
2009	"Let's Stay In Tonight"	—	—	20	—	Bringing Back the Funk
2009	"Go"	—	—	5	—	Live from the Inside
2010	"Skies Wide Open"	58	58	—	13	XII
2010	"That's Life"	—	—	1	—	XII
2011	"It's Time"	—	—	2	—	XII
2012	"Your Smile"	—	—	1	—	Dreams
2012	"Still Here"	61	61	—	15	Dreams
2012	"Later Tonight"	—	—	3	—	Dreams
2012	"You're My Music"	—	—	—	23	Dreams
2014	"Fullerton Ave."	—	—	1	—	Another Long Night Out
2014	"Horizon"	—	—	2	—	Another Long Night Out
2015	"Think Free" (live)	—	—	1	—	Live – 20th Anniversary Tour
2016	"Been Around the World"	—	—	1	—	Funk!
2017	"Hey Girl"	—	—	1	—	Funk!
2017	"Let's Take a Ride"	—	—	4	—	Funk!
2018	"Colors of Love"	—	—	1	—	Colors of Love
2018	"You're Magic"	—	—	1	—	Colors of Love
2018	"Understanding"	—	—	13	—	Marcus Anderson – Limited Edition
2019	"L.O.V.E."	—	—	18	—	Eric Darius – Breakin' Thru
2019	"Morning Walk"	—	—	2	—	Winter Stories
2020	"Get Up!"	—	—	1	—	XX
2020	"Keep Movin'"	—	—	1	—	XX
2020	"Time Flies"	—	—	4	—	XX
2021	"Let's Go"	—	—	8	—	Music from 'The Hang'
2021	"Feel the Love"	—	—	21	—	The Trilogy – Part 1: Red
2022	"I Didn't Mean It"	—	—	5	—	Lindsey Webster – Reasons
2022	"Step Into Love"	—	—	5	—	The Trilogy – Part 3: White
2022	"Sistas"	—	—	3	—	Marqueal Jordan – All We Have Are Moments
2022	"Sandcastles"	—	—	15	—	The Trilogy – Part 3: White
2023	"Dance with Me Tonight"	—	—	5	—	The Trilogy – Part 3: White
2024	"Sandcastles 2.0"	—	—	9	—	Non-album single
2024	"Come Dance with Me"	—	—	14	—	Donald Hayes – Soul Searching
2025	"On the Road"	—	—	1	—	Day Trip
2026	"Morning Light"	—	—	4	—	Day Trip
"—" denotes a recording that did not chart.
