= Hinge Studios =

Recording studio in California

Coordinates: 34.10146°N 118.3107°W

Hinge Studios is a recording and mixing studio in Los Angeles, California. Opened by Craig Bauer in Chicago, Illinois in 1993, the studio was referred to as "Kanye West's fortress of solitude in the late '90s" by MTVNews.

In 2014, Hinge Studios relocated to Los Angeles, California, temporarily operating at Devonshire Studios in North Hollywood. Hinge Studios is now permanently located in Los Angeles.

Some artists that have worked at Hinge Studios include Kanye West, Lupe Fiasco, Justin Timberlake, Halo Circus, Justin Young, Anita Wilson, Ed Sheeran, the Clark Sisters, Janet Jackson, Rihanna, Common, Jennifer Hudson, Lil' Kim, Wu-Tang Clan, Da Brat, Brian Culbertson, Richard Marx, 98°, Yolanda Adams, Steve Cole, Dave Koz, Dennis DeYoung, Styx, Donald Lawrence, Destiny's Child, Public Enemy, Hezekiah Walker, and the Smashing Pumpkins.
