= Transgender Day =

Transgender or Trans Day may refer to:

- International Transgender Day of Visibility, annual event for transgender people
- Trans Day of Action, annual rally and march held in June
- Trans Day of Revenge, 2016 EP by G.L.O.S.S.
- Transgender Day of Remembrance, day to memorialize those who have been killed as a result of transphobia
- National Trans Visibility Day, annual date in Brazil

== See also ==
- Transgender Awareness Week, One-week celebration leading up to Transgender Day of Remembrance
- Category:Transgender events
