= Chanelle Pickett =

Transgender woman whose death inspired the creation of the Transgender Day of Remembrance

- Born: August 6, 1972; New York, U.S.
- Died: November 20, 1995 (aged 23); Watertown, Massachusetts, U.S.

Chanelle Pickett (August 6, 1972 – November 20, 1995) was an American transgender woman whose death helped inspire the creation of the Transgender Day of Remembrance.

== Early life ==
Chanelle Pickett was born on August 6, 1972, in New York. She was described by her twin sister, Gabrielle Pickett, as "high-spirited and confident" and "full of life" with "many goals" and by her friends as "beautiful", a "flirt", and "very happy and funny". She and Gabrielle Pickett both identified as transgender women and were very close to each other, transitioning medically and socially together at the same time. In their early years, the Pickett sisters attended Buffalo Traditional School. In 1992, at the age of 19–20, they appeared on The Jenny Jones Show, where they discussed their lives and experiences, including the fact that their mother cut ties with them because of their gender identity. They were also guests on Geraldo, on a segment titled "Dead Ringers, Twisted Tales of Twins".

In 1993, they moved to the Boston area where both twins lived together in an apartment in Chelsea, Massachusetts. The Pickett sisters worked at NYNEX in Brookline, Massachusetts. After being outed as transgender in the workplace, they were harassed by a supervisor for many weeks and then fired in February 1995.

== Death ==
=== Context ===
In the time leading up to Chanelle Pickett's death, the Boston community saw a rise of violence against LGBTQ+ people, and in 1995, violence against LGBTQ people is recorded to have increased by 36% from the previous year. The increase in violence against LGBTQ+ people, namely trans people, can be attributed to the increased public presence of transgender people and movements of the early 1990s, as increased visibility and representation increases susceptibility to violence. Boston had a thriving transgender scene, but with that came an increase of violence against trans people. Transmisogynist ideologies and politics were particularly rampant during this time, having been spearheaded by Janice Raymond's 1979 book, The Transsexual Empire: The Making of the She-Male.

Pickett's death was preceded by the murders of and violence toward many trans women in Massachusetts, including the May 1994 murder of Deborah "Debbie" Forte—a white trans woman—in Haverhill, Massachusetts, that happened just a few months and about 35 miles away from Pickett's death. Murders of trans women, namely Black trans women, in the Boston area followed Pickett's death, including the murders of Rita Hester and Monique Thomas, both in 1998. Hester herself once provided a comment on Pickett's trial to local LGBT newspaper In Newsweekly, saying, "I'm afraid of what will happen if [Palmer] gets off lightly. It'll just give people a message that it's OK to do this. This is a message we cannot afford to send."

=== Death ===
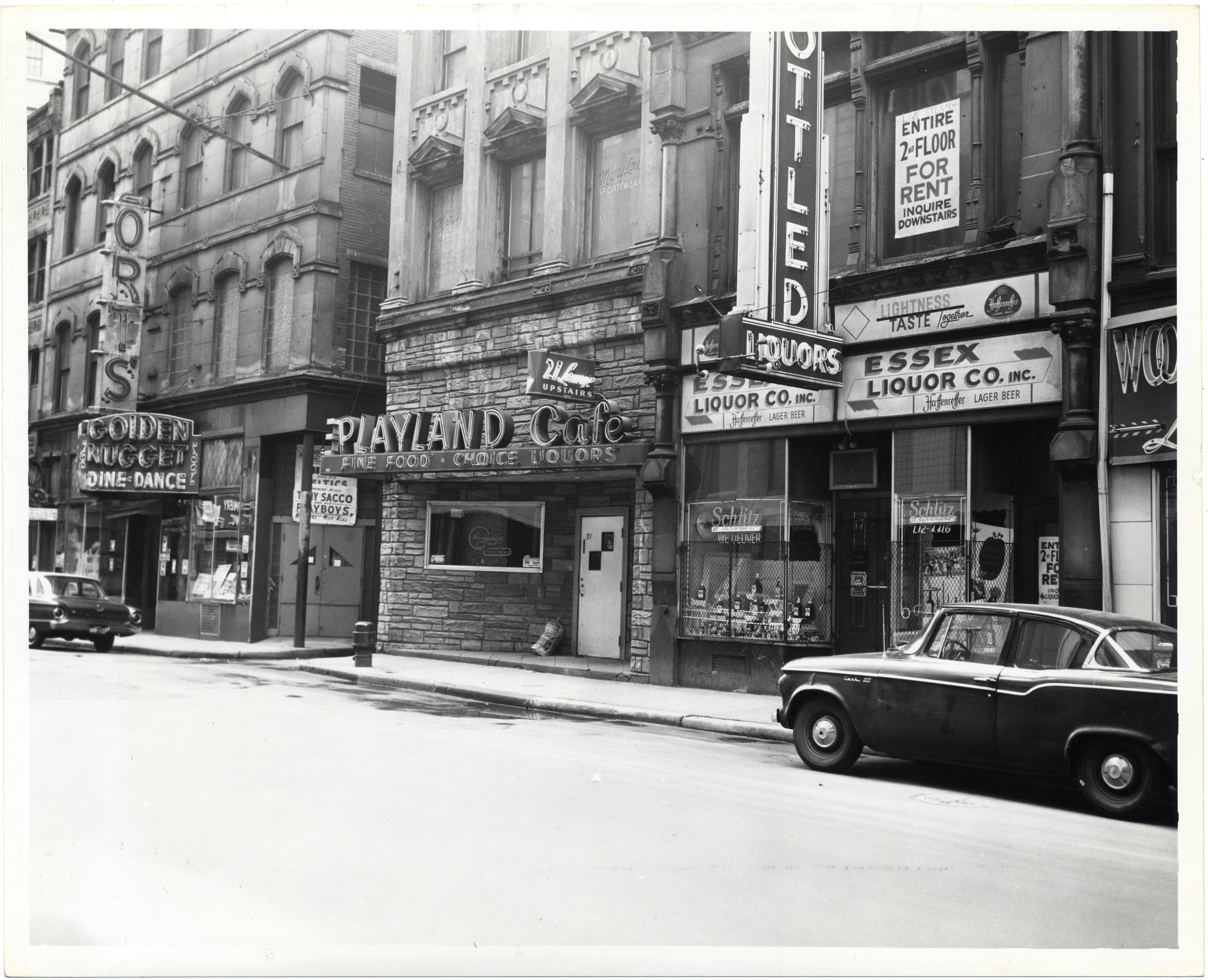
Exterior of Playland Cafe

Chanelle Pickett died in the early hours of the morning on November 20, 1995, in Watertown, Massachusetts. The Pickett sisters met William C. Palmer at the Playland Cafe—one of Boston's known "transsexual pick-up bars" located near Boston's "Combat Zone", a red-light district known for its high crime rates—on November 19. Palmer drove the Pickett sisters back to their apartment in Chelsea and stayed for a little while before inviting them both over in hopes of a three-way sexual encounter, but only Chanelle went to Palmer's apartment in Watertown with him. Palmer's roommates reported hearing sounds of "intense" struggle coming from Palmer's room in the early hours of the morning. After Palmer allegedly called an attorney who in turn called the police, Pickett's body was found that afternoon in Palmer's apartment.

=== Trial ===
On November 28, 1995, $50,000 cash bail was appointed to William Palmer.

Gabrielle Pickett, Chanelle Pickett's sister, was a key witness in the trial, revealing the vital information that Palmer always knew Chanelle Pickett was trans. Palmer initially claimed that he attacked Pickett after he found out she "was actually a man." However, after interviews with Gabrielle Pickett and those who knew Chanelle Pickett, news outlets started to communicate that Palmer was a known frequent customer of Playland Cafe and other trans establishments and sexually fetishized 'pre-op' trans women. Six trans people came forward and claimed that they had also had sexual encounters with Palmer, and two out of the six testified. The judge did not allow the other witnesses to testify about their encounters with Palmer. A few days later, he changed his story and claimed that he had fallen asleep next to her while she was still alive and woke up to her dead, and that the cause of her death was drug-related.

Although the medical examiner, Dr. Stanton Kessler, ruled Chanelle Pickett's cause of death was manual strangulation, two defense experts—one of whom also testified at O.J. Simpson's trials—argued against the medical examiner and said Pickett had died from drugs. Robert Cunningham, a juror for the trial, claimed that the medical examiners "didn't do a complete job", and that there was insufficient medical evidence to prove that Pickett had been strangled to death.

Palmer's attorneys used the "homosexual panic" or "trans panic" defense to account for his violence toward Pickett. Walter Prince argued that it was "out of character" for Palmer to have dated transgender people.

On May 16, 1997, after three days of deliberation, Palmer was not convicted of murder, but was convicted of assault and battery and sentenced to two years in prison and five years of probation.

== Impact ==
=== Remember Chanelle ===
On December 18, 1995, after Pickett's death, a group of activists—including Nancy Nangeroni—formed a group called "Remember Chanelle" that was dedicated to activism against anti-trans violence. The group created six task forces: Media, Legislative, Community, Legal, Stories, and Victim Recovery.

=== Vigils ===
Chanelle Pickett's death led to many vigils, protests, and other demonstrations.

On December 10, 1995, about 250 people attended a service at a local church dedicated to Pickett that was followed by a candlelight vigil and wreath hanging at the State House on the first day of Palmer's trial. Nancy Nangeroni, as well as activists Riki Anne Wilchins and Leslie Feinberg, spoke at the event, which was organized by Transsexual Menace in a similar way to the vigils held after the deaths of both Deborah Forte and Brandon Teena. Among others, city councilor David Scondras also spoke at the event.

On February 27, 1997, roughly 35 people gathered outside of the Middlesex County Courthouse in Cambridge, Massachusetts in support of Chanelle Pickett and in opposition to Palmer in a vigil co-sponsored by the Remember Chanelle Committee, the Transexual Menace, and the Fenway Community Health Center Victim Recovery Program. They held signs that read "there's no shame in loving transsexuals" and handed out flyers that were titled "TRANSPEOPLE ARE NOT DISPOSABLE PEOPLE!".

On May 16, 1997, the day that Palmer received his sentence, Nancy Nangeroni and about 25 others gathered outside of the courthouse in protest of anti-trans violence.

=== Transgender Day of Remembrance ===
In 1999, Gwendolyn Ann Smith observed the similarities between Chanelle Pickett in 1995 and Rita Hester in 1998; after Hester's murder, Smith was surprised to realize that none of her friends remembered Pickett, saying "It really surprised me that it had already, in a short period of time, been forgotten, and here we were with another murder at the same site.” She started a website called "Remembering Our Dead", where she compiled information about deaths caused by transphobic/homophobic violence. Smith was then inspired to make this memorial a live event, and created the Transgender Day of Remembrance (TDOR), which aims to prevent the erasure of trans people who have been victims of anti-trans violence. The first TDOR occurred in San Francisco and Boston in November 1999 because November was the month that both Pickett's death and Hester's murder took place. Trans Day of Remembrance now happens annually on November 20, the anniversary of Chanelle Pickett's death.
