= Jahaira DeAlto =

American anti-domestic violence activist (died 2021)

- Born: Beirut, Lebanon
- Died: May 2, 2021 (aged 41–42); Dorchester, Massachusetts, U.S.
- Other name: Jahaira DeAlto Balenciaga
- Education: Simmons University; Berkshire Community College
- Occupations: Activist, social worker, domestic violence advocate
- Movement: Transgender Resistance
- Parent: Doris Camer
- Family: House of Balenciaga
- Awards: 2019 Victim Rights Month Special Recognition Award, Massachusetts Office of Victim Assistance

Jahaira DeAlto Balenciaga was a social work student, community advocate, anti-domestic violence activist, house mother, and local ballroom drag scene performer in Boston, Massachusetts, US.

DeAlto spoke at the Ryan White Conference on HIV/AIDS, presented at Harvard University, and was a guest lecturer at Columbia University's School of Social Work. She made videos for the transgender community.

DeAlto was murdered in her Dorchester home on May 2, 2021.

== Early life ==
DeAlto was adopted by her mother, Doris Camer, from Beirut, Lebanon. DeAlto grew up in Dorchester, Massachusetts, US. As a child, she struggled to express who she truly was, facing incessant bullying. DeAlto began transitioning at age 16.

== Education ==
When asked in an interview why she hadn't gone to college sooner, DeAlto commented, “I thought that college was for people who were richer, and whiter, and cis, and all that I was not.”

=== Berkshire Community College ===
DeAlto enrolled in Berkshire Community College (BCC), earned a scholarship for students who have overcome obstacles in life, and graduated in 2019 with an associate degree and certificate in human services. DeAlto became a spokesperson for the Massachusetts program, Credit for Prior Learning, which allows community college students to complete a portfolio about their lived experiences for academic credit. At BCC, DeAlto helped develop a peer-mentorship program for students from first-generation and low-income backgrounds.

=== Simmons University ===
At the time of her death, she was enrolled in the Undergraduate Social Work program at Simmons University, with plans to graduate in 2023. Professor Diane Grossman, who had DeAlto as a student and advisee at Simmons, stated DeAlto was, “exceptionally bright and tremendously committed to social justice issues around trans rights, victims of abuse, and more. She had a charismatic personality and was a magnet for other Simmons students who admired her tremendous experience as a community leader. As a vocal supporter of her peers, Jahaira stood up for issues of equality, justice, and inclusion.” Professor Katie Nolan, DeAlto's teacher and social work advisor said of DeAlto, "Her understanding of the importance of human relationships as well as her lifelong commitment to social justice were evident in every interaction that she had in the classroom, with peers and faculty, and in her work in the community." In a town hall meeting held to commemorate and mourn DeAlto, Professor Lydia Ogden shared that whenever DeAlto spoke in class, Ogden was sure DeAlto would receive a Doctorate of Social Work one day and become a professor. In 2022, $26,729 was raised to support the Jahaira M.DeAlto Endowed Scholarship at Simmons.

== Ballroom career and chosen family ==
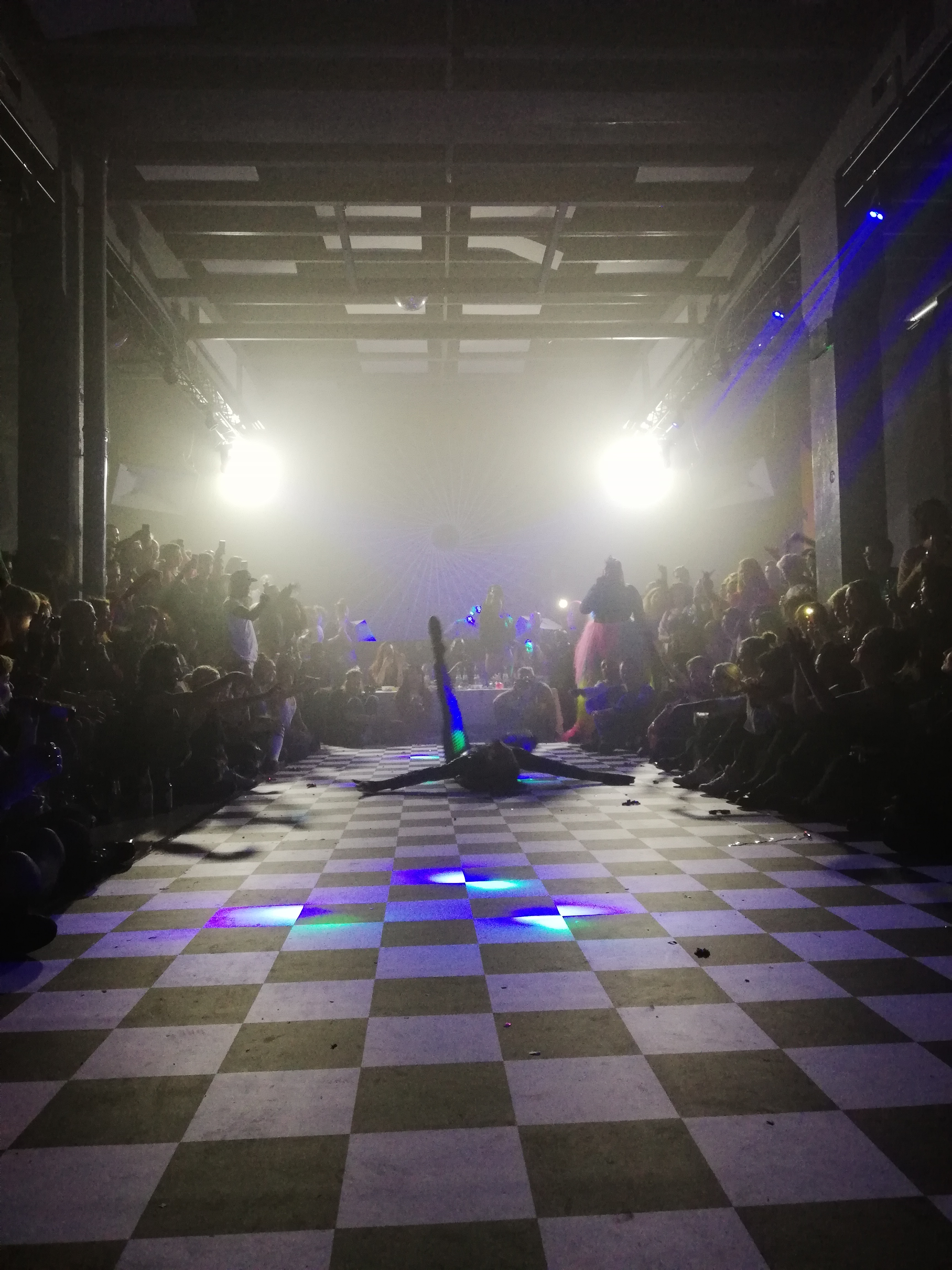
A performer vogues during a community ball. DeAlto was known for her participation in the realness category.

DeAlto began her ballroom career in Boston in 1996 and nurtured relationships with other transgender women of color to create a chosen family. She belonged to the House of Balencia. In ballroom, the category she was most known for was realness.

Harold Balenciaga, Founder of the House of Balenciaga, released a public statement on the night of DeAlto's death saying, "The House of Balenciaga regretfully acknowledges the death/murder of our own Jahaira M. DeAlto, a community advocate and friend to many. Let us not forget her ongoing work against domestic abuse and continue to uplift her name and ensure her memory lives on in this ironic twist of fate."

=== Children ===
DeAlto served as a chosen mother to many people in the LGBTQ community abandoned by their birth families, the exact number of how many children she raised is unknown. DeAlto's friend in the ballroom community, Feroza Syed, commented, "Countless people considered her a mother figure, and I’ve seen dozens if not hundreds of posts talking about the impact of their relationship with her… Through her work she saved hundreds of lives and inspired many others to do the work."

Athena Vaughn was one of DeAlto's children, and lived with DeAlto for more than a decade after her family rejected her when she came out as trans. Vaughn described DeAlto as, "The essence of giving hope, the essence of guiding, the essence of uplifting, and just having someone to show you the unconditional love that your biological family was no longer giving because they were not supporting your lifestyle.” Vaughn is a co-founder and leader of Trans Resistance MA.

Commenting on motherhood, DeAlto shared on Mother's Day in 2020,

“I am the mother who raised the children whose rainbow sparkled too brightly and blinded their birth moms. I cherished what they discarded. I took on earthly assignments for the moms who’d earned their Heavenly reward. For their babies who still needed raising. I did that. And I’m still doing that. And I’ll keep doing that. Because I will never know what seeing my DNA reflected in another’s eyes could look like, but I know what gratitude in the eyes of a young person who finally feels seen looks like. And for me, that’s enough.”

=== Friendship with Rita Hester ===
DeAlto spent most of her life honoring the remembrance of close friend and member of her chosen family, Black trans woman, Rita Hester, who was brutally murdered in Allston in 1998.

DeAlto was one of the organizers that helped launch the first Transgender Day of Remembrance (TDoR) that was created in Hester's honor.

=== Friendship with Ta’aliyah Ayanna “Endego" Jones ===
In 1996, DeAlto befriended Ta’aliyah Ayanna “Endego" Jones, a Black trans woman in the ballroom community.

In a tribute on Massachusetts Transgender Political Coalition's website, on the day Jones' death was announced, DeAlto wrote that Jones was humble and never posted on social media. DeAlto credited Jones for facilitating groups at Ryan White National Youth Conference on HIV/AIDS, presenting on the trans youth experience to a group of grad students at Harvard University at 16-years-old, organizing her first ball with sponsorship to save Boston's ballroom community, and receiving a master's degree.

DeAlto and Jones shared memories such as performing together at Club Café and watching Tracy Chapman perform in Harvard Square.

== Domestic violence advocacy ==
=== Elizabeth Freeman Center ===
In 2019, The Massachusetts Office of Victim Assistance (MOVA) awarded DeAlto with the Victim Rights Month Special Recognition Award for her work as a counselor and a member of the Elizabeth Freeman Center LGBTQ Community Advisory/Action Group. DeAlto also served as MOVA's 2019 Victim Rights Conference keynote speaker.

Commenting on the recognition, DeAlto said, "As a survivor of violence myself, I know personally that the journey from victim to survivor comes with owning your own story". About DeAlto, MOVA stated, “She is a survivor, an advocate and a voice for victims and survivors across the Commonwealth. Jahaira has worked diligently to increase access to sexual and domestic violence response services for LGBTQ survivors, and has made notable contributions toward advancing victim rights.”

In 2021, Elizabeth Freeman Center spoke of her legacy, “We remember Jahaira as a colleague, activist and survivor who touched the lives of everyone around her with her passion, drive, humanity, humor, and fierce vision.”

=== Casa Myrna ===
At the time of her death, DeAlto was working at Casa Myrna, a provider of shelter and services to survivors of domestic violence and their children. In a public statement regarding her death, Casa Myrna stated, “She turned every obstacle in life into a strength and a way to help others. She was an activist, an advocate, a nurturer, a leader, an educator, and a friend.”

== Activism in the Berkshires ==
DeAlto was a founder of the Berkshire Transgender Day of Remembrance and Berkshire Pride Festival.

Berkshire Pride Festival organizer Kelan O’Brien said of DeAlto, “She was such a rock. I never thought that she was going to be on that list, and now I think we are all determined to make sure that she is not just a number, because she lived such a full life, and that should be how we remember her."

In 2018, DeAlto was the keynote speaker at the Live Out Loud Conference at Berkshire Community College and Transgender Day of Remembrance at Berkshire Community College.

DeAlto served on the advisory board for an ongoing initiative at the Elizabeth Freeman Center that placed LGBTQ+ advocates in each of the organization's Berkshire County locations, and went on to work for the center as an advocate at the emergency shelter, while also fielding calls to the center's emergency crisis line.

DeAlto advocated for local access to appropriate health care for transgender individuals and their right to use public accommodations that align with their gender identities.

In 2021, Pittsfield, Massachusetts raised a pride flag and dedicated their pride month celebrations to DeAlto.

== Death ==
On May 2, 2021, DeAlto was murdered by Marcus Chavis in a violent attack at her home in Dorchester. Boston police received a call for a person stabbed on Taft Street. When officers arrived, they found two women suffering from stab wounds: DeAlto and Fatima Yasin, 28.

Yasin's husband, Marcus Chavis, 34, was arrested and charged on two counts of murder, after calling to turn himself in. Chavis has schizophrenia and PTSD.

Yasin, Chavis and their two children, aged seven and eight years old, were staying at DeAlto's house because DeAlto wanted to “make a safe space for them to get out of a bad situation”, an invitation she often extended to victims/survivors of domestic violence. Yasin and Chavis's children witnessed the murders of Yasin and DeAlto by Chavis, but were physically unharmed.

DeAlto's murder and domestic violence advocacy brought more attention to the challenges transgender women face trying to escape abusive situations.

In 2021, DeAlto was survived by her dog Albi, her mother Doris Camer and many in the Berkshires, Boston, LGBT, ballroom and domestic violence survivor communities.
