= Irene Monroe =

American public theologian and columnist

Reverend Irene Monroe is an American public theologian, columnist and speaker.

== Early life and education ==
Monroe was abandoned shortly after her birth and was discovered by a cleanup worker in a park trash can. She was raised in Brooklyn, New York and was educated as a Ford Foundation fellow at Wellesley College and the Union Theological Seminary at Columbia University. She studied for her doctorate at Harvard Divinity School.

== Career ==
Monroe hosts a weekly segment, "All Revved Up!", on WGBH and is a weekly commentator on New England Cable News. She additionally writes a weekly column for Bay Windows and has written content for HuffPost, The Boston Herald, The Boston Globe, and The Cambridge Chronicle. She formerly wrote the columns "The Religion Thang" for In Newsweekly, "Faith Matters" for The Advocate, and "Queer Take" for The Witness Magazine. Monroe is the founder of three Christian LGBTQ+ organizations: Equal Partners of Faith, the Religious Coalition for the Freedom to Marry, and Christian Lesbians Out. She has additionally served on the Religious Advisory Committee of the Human Rights Campaign and as the commissioner of the Cambridge LGBTQ+ Commission.

Monroe was named as one of Boston's 50 Most Intriguing Women by Boston magazine in 1997, and was nominated for the Bishop Carl Bean Spirituality Award the following year. That year, in 1998, she became the first African-American lesbian to be the grand marshal of Boston Pride. Monroe additionally led the vigil for murdered trans woman Rita Hester in 1998. She received the YWCA Cambridge's Tribute to Outstanding Women Award in 2011, the GLBTQ Legal Advocates & Defenders Spirit of Justice Award in 2012, the Bayard Rustin Service Award in 2013, and the Fenway Health Susan M. Love Award in 2020. Furthermore, while serving as a teaching fellow for Peter J. Gomes, she received the Harvard University Certificate of Distinction in Teaching. Prior to her employment at Harvard, she worked as a pastor at an African-American church in New Jersey.

In 2007, Monroe appeared in the film For the Bible Tells Me So and has additionally been featured on In the Life, CRISIS: 40 Stories Revealing the Personal, Social, and Religious Pain and Trauma of Growing up Gay in America, and Youth in Crisis.

Monroe served as a visiting scholar in the Religion and Conflict Transformation Program at Boston University School of Theology during the 2018-19 school year.

In 2025, Monroe and her spouse, Dr. Thea James, became the first LGBTQ+ couple to be Embrace Honors MLK Awardees.

== Personal life ==
Monroe identifies as a Christian, a lesbian, and as a feminist. She is a member emeritus of the National Black Justice Coalition.

Monroe is married to Dr. Thea James, who works as an associate chief medical officer at Boston Medical Center. The couple live in Cambridge.
