= Monique Thomas =

Massachusetts murder victim (1963–1998)

- Born: March 30, 1963
- Died: September 11, 1998 (aged 35); Dorchester, Massachusetts, U.S.
- Cause of death: Murder
- Education: Northeastern University
- Known for: Inspiring the Transgender Day of Remembrance

Monique Thomas (March 30, 1963 – September 11, 1998) was a Black transgender woman who resided in Dorchester, Massachusetts. Her death, along with the murders of other Black transgender women in Boston, such as Rita Hester, led to the creation of International Transgender Day of Remembrance.

== Early life ==
Monique Thomas spent her childhood in Massachusetts, graduating from Jeremiah E. Burke High School in Roxbury. Following this, she attended the Northeastern University Dental Assistants Program under her dead name (which she is almost exclusively referred to as in public and media records) and graduated at age 19. At the time of her death, she was living in Dorchester, MA.

== Murder ==
Monique Thomas was murdered at age 35 by George Stallings, and her body was found in her apartment a week after her death, at 8 pm on September 11, 1998, by Boston Police. Her jewelry, credit cards, and car were stolen after her death. Thomas's car was found September 23, 1998, in Manchester, New Hampshire which led to Stallings' arrest.

=== Trial ===
Stallings pleaded guilty to second-degree murder on June 6, 2000. He was sentenced to life, with the possibility of parole. As of 2019, Stallings' petition for parole was denied. As of 2024 George Stallings was released on parole. He currently resides in a residential facility in Lowell, MA.

== Legacy ==
Monique Thomas's death was one of three such murders that began a recognition of the danger transgender individuals face internationally. Her murder was discussed alongside the murders of Rita Hester and Chanelle Pickett in "Remembering Our Dead," a web project that led to the creation of International Transgender Day of Remembrance. Although Monique's death was not mentioned often during the initial creation of the day, she is now frequently mentioned in articles that discuss the ongoing impact and observance of Transgender Day of Remembrance.
