= Trans Day of Action =

Annual rally and march held in June

Trans Day of Action (TDOA) began in 2005 and is an annual rally and march held in late June in New York City. It is organized by the Audre Lorde Project's Trans Justice group. It aims "to call attention to the continued violence, discrimination and institutionalization of our people [Trans and Gender Non-Conforming people], while simultaneously lifting up and celebrating our legacy of resilience, organizing, and community building." While addressing issues that disproportionately impact trans and gender non-conforming people, TDOA is also meant to honor and contribute to the broader "struggle for justice, liberation, and recognition for all oppressed people worldwide."

In its first year, TDOA drew over 1,000 participants. The 2016 event gathered 2,000 attendees in Washington Square, and included speakers such as Olympia Perez of the Audre Lorde Project and Jennicet Gutiérrez of Familia Trans Queer Liberation Movement. TDOA is supported by a range of organizations, including SALGA (South Asian Lesbian and Gay Association) and GLAAD (formerly the Gay & Lesbian Alliance Against Defamation). The event is highly inter-sectional, as "TGNC communities include communities of color, immigrants, youth, elders, rural communities, and differently abled communities... as TGNC communities of color, we view our struggles as one and the same as broader struggles for social justice domestically and directly connected—if not the same as—struggles for social justice globally."

In 2021 it was reported that it was the worst year in LGBTQ+ rights in the US in the history of TDOA, with more anti LGBTQ+ legislation being passed than in years past.

== See also ==
- International Transgender Day of Visibility
- Trans March
- National Trans Visibility March
- Transgender Day of Remembrance
