= Old Central High School =

Old Central High School may refer to:

- Old Central High School (Pittsfield, Massachusetts), listed on the National Register of Historic Places in Berkshire County, Massachusetts
- Old Central High School (Kalamazoo, Michigan), listed on the National Register of Historic Places in Kalamazoo County, Michigan
- Central High School (Shreveport, Louisiana), also known as Old Central High School (Shreveport, Louisiana), listed on the National Register of Historic Places in Caddo Parish
