= Black News =

Black News may refer to:

- Black News Channel, an American pay television news channel that ran from 2020 to 2022
- BLKNWS: Terms & Conditions, a 2025 American documentary film
