= Matt Cusson =

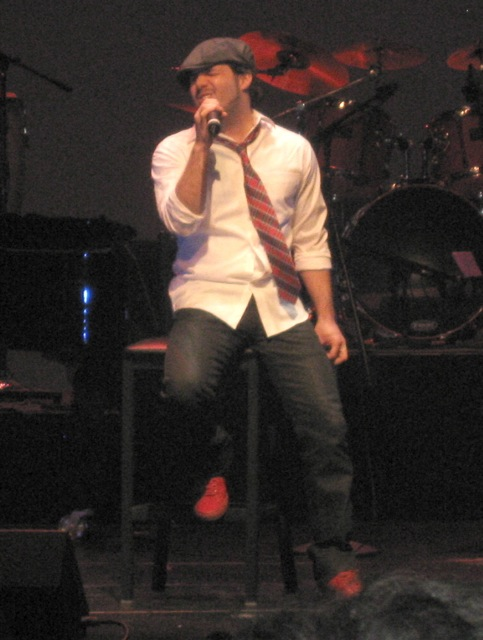

Background information
- Genres: R&B, pop
- Occupations: Singer, musician
- Instrument: Keyboards
- Website: mattcusson.com

Matt Cusson is a pop and R&B singer.

== Biography ==
Born and raised in Pittsfield, Massachusetts to a classical piano teacher and choir director, music of all different genres was introduced to Cusson at an early age. He attended St. Joseph High School and Berkshire Community College. He studied at Berklee College of Music in Boston where he played with John Mayer and Ryan Leslie.

== Career ==
In 2000, Cusson was discovered by Brian McKnight, who a day after hearing him perform flew him to Los Angeles to collaborate.

In 2004, he was chosen as the only male singer to perform with Christina Aguilera on her summer tour Exposed. He has performed on The Daily Beat with Allure, BET Live with Avant, Bobby Jones Gospel, and the 2003 U.S. Open Tennis Tour with Here II Praise.

In 2009, while on tour with his mentor McKnight, Cusson was awarded the Maxell Song of the Year and the John Lennon Songwriting Contest Best Jazz Song for his composition "One of Those Nights", while his single "Every Step" performed in the top three in the R&B category. In that same year, his self-titled album was a pick for top 10 albums of 2009 in the Japanese magazine BMR.

He has performed live on The View and Live with Regis and Kelly. He was one of the 12 people chosen out of hundreds to perform at Amateur Night at the Apollo Theatre in New York City and went on to win the competition three times.

Cusson signed with Spectra Jazz in 2010 to release his single "One Of Those Nights". He performed as a member of the international Michael Jackson Man in the Mirro tribute tour. Soon after, Cusson received a 2011 Song of the Year nomination from the Oasis Contemporary Jazz Award committee for his composition of "One Of Those Nights".
