= Berkshire Community College =

Public college in Pittsfield, Massachusetts, US

Coordinates: 42°27′37.39″N 73°18′53.33″W

- Motto: Start Here. Go Anywhere.
- Type: Public community college
- Established: 1960
- Accreditation: NECHE
- President: Hara Charlier
- Administrative staff: 330 full and part-time (2015 est.)
- Students: 3,000 (2015 est.)
- Location: Pittsfield, Massachusetts, United States
- Campus: 180 acres (73 ha); Rural
- Mascot: Falcon
- Website: www.berkshirecc.edu

Berkshire Community College is a public community college in Berkshire County, Massachusetts with its primary campus in Pittsfield. It also has a satellite campus in Great Barrington and classroom spaces in the city of Pittsfield. Established in the 1960s, it is the oldest college founded by the Massachusetts Community Colleges Executive Office.

More than 2,000 students enroll annually in BCC's academic programs, which include associate degrees, certificate programs, and transfer programs. Additional students enroll in noncredit or workforce development courses. The majority of students are from Massachusetts, with 96% coming from Berkshire County. The student body is 61% female and nearly half of enrolled students are 23 years old or older. Berkshire Community College has been accredited by the New England Association of Schools and Colleges since 1964.

== History ==
Berkshire Community College opened on September 15, 1960 as the first publicly funded community college in Massachusetts. The Old Central High School in Pittsfield served as BCC's campus for its first eleven years, during which admission grew from 153 students to 1,222. The college moved to its current campus at 1350 West Street in 1972.

BCC expanded classes to southern Berkshire County in the 1980s. The college's South County Center, which was purchased and renovated in 1987, is in the former Whittaker's Garage building at 343 South Main St. in Great Barrington. During the 1990s and early 2000s, BCC launched "teleclassroom" courses through Pittsfield Community TV, the city's public-access television channel and offered online courses through its website.

BCC and Massachusetts College of Liberal Arts jointly operate a satellite campus at the Silvio O. Conte Federal Building in downtown Pittsfield. The campus, which opened in 2011, provides access to associate, baccalaureate, an MBA program through MCLA, and workforce skills-assessment and development programs

Since 2007, the college's Berkshire Institute of Lifelong Learning has been affiliated with the nationwide Osher Lifelong Learning Institutes. The BCC program is one of only four adult education programs in the nation to be affiliated with a two-year college, and received a $1 million endowment gift to administer in perpetuity in 2010.

=== Presidents ===
- Thomas O'Connell (1960 – 1978)
- Jonathan Daube (1978 – 1987)
- Cathryn Addy (1987 – 1994)
- Barbara Viniar (1994 – 2003)
- Bryan Blanchard (2003 – 2005)
- Paul Raverta (2005 – 2012)
- Ellen Kennedy (2012 – 2026)
- Hara Charlier (2026 – present)

== Campus ==
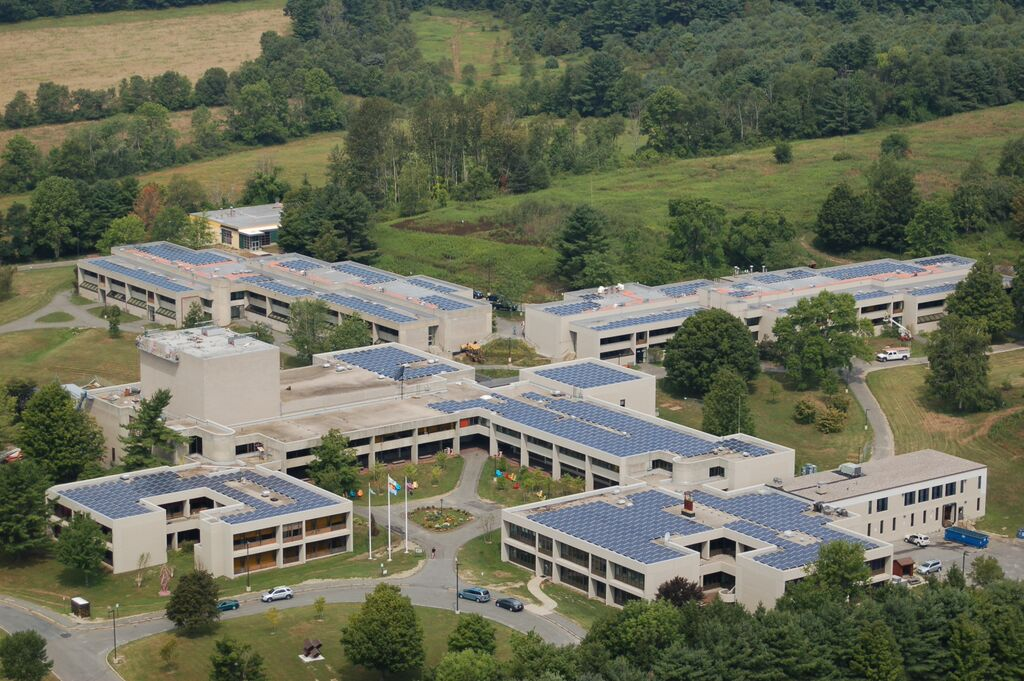
Aerial view of Berkshire Community College's campus on 1350 West Street in Pittsfield, Massachusetts.

Berkshire Community College's main campus at 1350 West Street spans 180 acres in a park-like setting. Facilities include the Ralph Hoffmann Environmental Science and Sustainable Energy Center, and the Barbara A. Nichols Nursing Arts Center, which houses the college's nursing courses. Sections of the campus are used by the Pittsfield Family YMCA as part of Camp Sumner, its summer camp.

== Academics ==
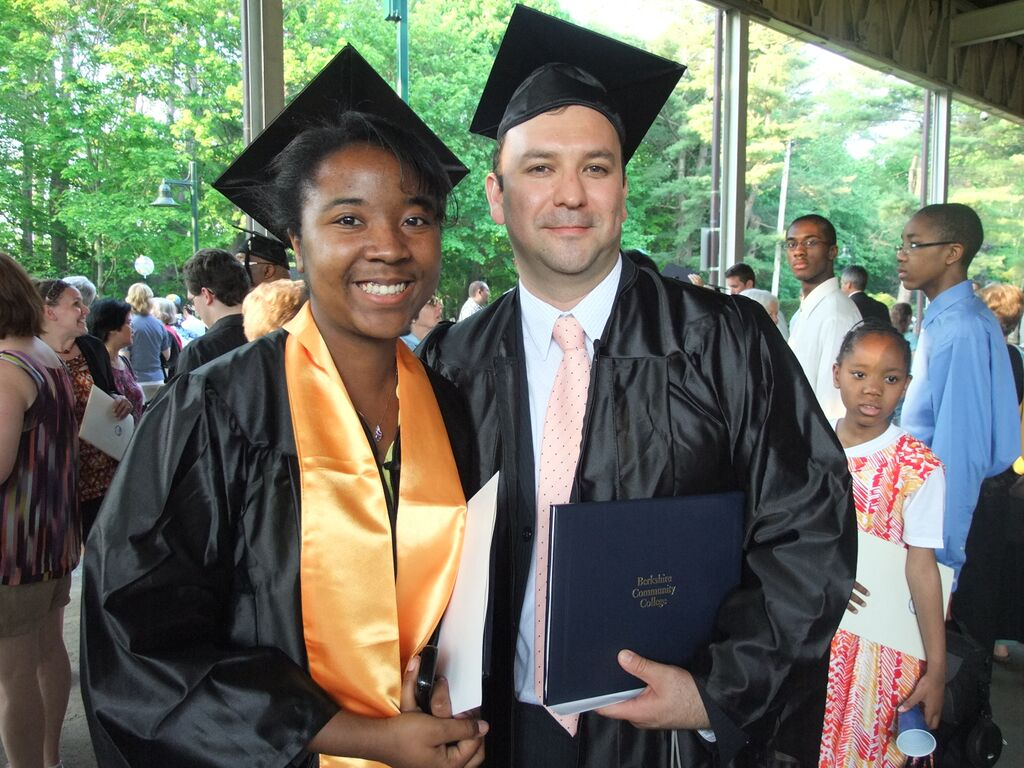
Graduates pose with diplomas following commencement at the Koussevitzky Music Shed in Lenox.

Berkshire Community College offers associate degrees and certificate programs. The college's Associate in Arts degree program confirms to the requirements of the Massachusetts Transfer Compact; students pursuing an Associate in Science degree pay pursue additional courses to be eligible for compact status. Students are also eligible to receive second degrees or concentrations. Certificate programs in fields including massage therapy and bodywork, practical nursing, and health information management may be completed in one year or less. Berkshire Community College is accredited by the New England Commission of Higher Education.

The college also has transfer articulation agreements with over thirty different colleges and universities and has joint admissions agreements with the University of Massachusetts, Massachusetts College of Liberal Arts, Cheyney University, Delaware State College, Florida A&M University, Hampton University, Howard University, and Tuskegee University. Together with the Charles H. McCann Technical School in North Adams, Massachusetts, BCC offers an accredited dental assistant degree program.

== Recreation ==
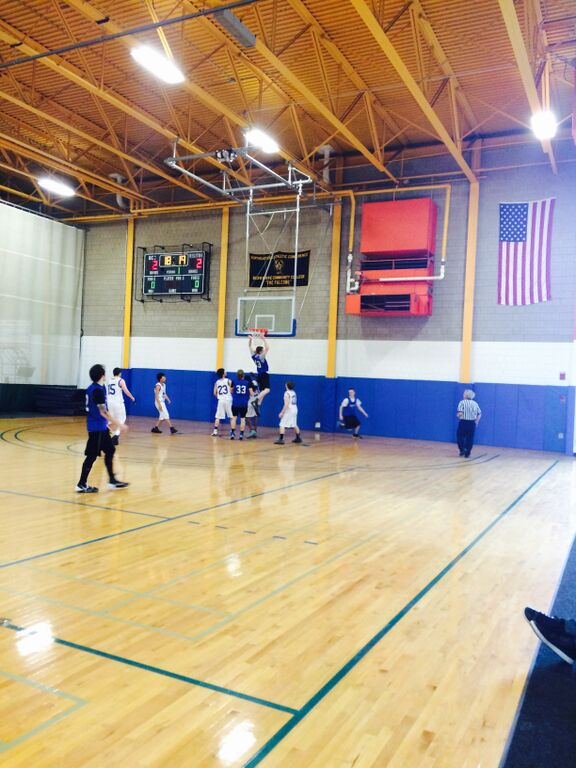
Students from Berkshire Community College's basketball team play against Bard College at Simon's Rock in the BCC gym.

Berkshire Community College offers club sports including cross country running, basketball, and soccer. In 2014, the college joined the Southern New England Club Basketball League in the East Division, which includes American International College, Goodwin College, Yale University, and Assumption College. Students also participate in seasonal hiking and snowshoeing excursions.

The Paterson Field House on BCC's campus provides students and community members access to athletic facilities including a fitness center, an outdoor swimming pool, and tennis courts.

The Bennington Martens of the American Basketball Association play their home games at BCC.

== Arts ==
BCC's student publication, The Zine, is a literary and art magazine published annually. The college's student theatre group, the BCC Players, has presented musicals and plays to the Berkshire community since 1973. The Koussevitzky Art Gallery at BCC features monthly installations by emerging and mid-career artists.

== Notable people ==
=== Faculty ===
- Francis Mahoney
- Clara Claiborne Park

=== Alumni ===
- Matt Cusson, artist
- Jahaira DeAlto, American activist
- Christopher Hodgkins, American politician
- Bo Bo Nge, Burmese economist and political activist

== See also ==
- List of colleges and universities in Massachusetts
