= Nancy Nangeroni =

Transgender activist

- Born: September 30, 1953 (age 72); Boston, Massachusetts, US
- Education: MIT, 1976 - Electrical Engineering
- Occupations: Electrical engineer, activist, radio host, designer
- Organization: International Foundation for Gender Education Massachusetts Transgender Political Coalition Transgender Resource Center of New Mexico

Nancy Nangeroni is an American diversity educator and transgender community activist. She is a founder of GenderTalk Radio, the award-winning talk show about gender and transgender issues that was broadcast from 1995 to 2006 on WMBR in Cambridge, Massachusetts. Nangeroni served as an executive director of the International Foundation for Gender Education and Chair of the Steering Committee of the Massachusetts Transgender Political Coalition.

== Career and impact ==
Nancy Nangeroni created the talk show GenderTalk Radio in 1995. The show was focused on transgender history and contemporary issues and co-hosted by Gordene MacKenzie and Nangeroni herself. It was broadcast weekly for over 11 years, ending on September 30th, 2006.

In the early 1990s, Nangeroni also founded the Boston area chapter of The Transexual Menace. Throughout the decade, she wrote about trans and gender issues, co-editing and publishing the collection In Your Face: The Journal of Political Activism, and commented continuously on anti-transgender violence and bigotry in Boston-area newspapers. In 1995, after the murder of transgender youth Brandon Teena, Nangeroni helped organize one of the first national actions against trans violence. The demonstration was held outside of Falls City, Nebraska, and was attended by over 40 trans activists, including Leslie Feinberg and Kate Bornstein.

With Transexual Menace, Nangeroni led the vigil for Rita Hester, a Black transgender woman murdered in Allston, Massachusetts on November 28, 1998. The event of violence towards a transgender person inspired the International Transgender Day of Remembrance, a campaign held annually to remember and honor the lives of transgender people reported murdered during the year. Nangeroni said of the International Transgender Day of Remembrance in 2014: "Until people no longer suffer violence for daring to openly live their true gender, the TDOR remains an important reminder of the worldwide hostility, violence, and murder that too many brothers, sisters, and genderqueers suffer every day. TDOR is about remembering and honoring victims and standing together in the community against gender-based hate."

At the time of Hester's death, Nancy Nangeroni chronicled the troubled media response to the event. In 2000, to commemorate the second anniversary of the murder, Nangeroni interviewed Hester's mother Kathleen and younger sister Diana on GenderTalk. From 2006 to 2008, Nangeroni and MacKenzie co-produced and co-hosted "'GenderVision,' an educational cable television program about gender identity."

Nangeroni is a Chair Emeritus of the Massachusetts Transgender Political Coalition, where she served for six years.

== Personal life ==
=== Early life and transition ===
Nangeroni was born in Boston and raised in Milton, Massachusetts. For many years, a closeted Nangeroni privately identified as a crossdresser or transvestite, but lived publicly as a cisgender man. Later, she moved to Silver Lake, Los Angeles. When she was 27, she collided with a car while riding her motorcycle, leaving her hospitalized for many weeks. This experience led Nangeroni to decide to come out to her family as a transgender woman; while her parents were supportive, she did not immediately begin to live publicly as a woman.

Upon returning to Boston, Nangeroni subscribed to TAPESTRY, a publication for trans and gender-nonconforming people published by the Tiffany Club and the International Foundation for Gender Education. She attended Fantasia Fair in Provincetown, Massachusetts, and there felt that she was able to live freely as a woman for the first time; after that she became active in the trans and crossdressing community.

=== Later life and activism ===
Starting in the 1990s, Nangeroni became an activist and leader in the Massachusetts transgender community. Nangeroni also worked as an electrical engineer until 2004, when a spinal injury forced her to leave the field. In 1998, Nangeroni met her partner Gordene MacKenzie, with whom she produced GenderVision and Gender Talk. They lived together in Cambridge, Massachusetts, and then Beverly until the mid-2010's. Since 2017, she has focused on design work and memoir writing. Nangeroni and MacKenzie married in 2018 and currently live in New Mexico. Her website details her current work, including past membership on the board of the Transgender Resource Center of New Mexico.

== Awards and recognition ==
In 2000, GenderTalk received an award from GLAAD for "Outstanding LGBT Radio". In 2020, Nancy Nangeroni was an honoree for the 2020 HistoryMaker Awards, presented by The History Project, Boston's LGBTQ+ archive.
