= BLKNWS: Terms & Conditions =

- Poster
- Directed by: Kahlil Joseph
- Written by: Kahlil Joseph; Saidiya Hartman; Irvin Hunt; Kristen Adele Calhoun; Elodie Saint-Louis; Sheba Anyanwu; Madebo Fatunde
- Produced by: Kahlil Joseph; Amy Greenleaf; Nic Gonda; Onye Anyanwu
- Starring: Shaunette Renée Wilson; Kaneza Schaal; Hope Giselle; Peter Jay Fernandez; Penny Johnson Jerald; Zora Casebere
- Cinematography: Bradford Young
- Edited by: Kahlil Joseph; Luke Lynch; Paul Rogers
- Music by: Klein; Philesciono Canty
- Production company: BN Media
- Distributed by: Rich Spirit
- Release dates: January 27, 2025 (Sundance); November 28, 2025 (United States)
- Running time: 113 minutes
- Country: United States
- Language: English

BLKNWS: Terms & Conditions is a 2025 American science docufiction film directed by Kahlil Joseph, in his directorial debut. It stars Shaunette Renée Wilson, Kaneza Schaal, Hope Giselle, Peter Jay Fernandez, Penny Johnson Jerald and Zora Casebere.

The film premiered in the NEXT section at the Sundance Film Festival on January 27, 2025.

== Synopsis ==
BLKNWS: Terms & Conditions is adapted from a video art installation by Kahlil Joseph. The work is presented as a cinematic experience structured to resemble the sonic qualities of a record album. It combines fictional and historical elements in an immersive format that features fictionalized portrayals of W. E. B. Du Bois and Marcus Garvey, alongside appearances by artists, musicians, members of Joseph's family, and material drawn from Twitter chats, collectively forming a vision centered on Black consciousness.

== Cast ==
- Shaunette Renée Wilson as Sarah
- Kaneza Schaal as Funmilayo Akachukwu
- Hope Giselle
- Peter Jay Fernandez as W.E.B. DuBois
- Penny Johnson Jerald
- Zora Casebere

== Production ==
In January 2022, it was announced Kahlil Joseph would direct the film, with Participant and A24 set to produce, with the latter additionally distributing. In June 2023, Shaunette Renée Wilson announced her involvement.

In January 2025, worldwide rights were acquired by James Shani's Rich Spirit.

== Release ==
BLKNWS: Terms & Conditions was originally set to premiere at the Sundance Film Festival on January 24, 2025. However, three days prior to its premiere, Participant pulled the film from the festival upon learning of a new cut made without their knowledge by Joseph, allegedly screened for critics at the talent agency CAA on January 17, and supposedly used to gain entry to the 75th Berlin International Film Festival, to be held in February 2025; the film's screening at the latter was also left in question. It was also revealed that A24 had quietly left the project in August 2024 upon Joseph's failure to submit the final film, which was approved by Participant three months later.

Later that month, Rich Spirit and BN Media bought Participant out of its ownership of the film, planning to sell it to a new distributor with the film back on track for a premiere at Sundance; it was also clarified that Joseph was circulating a polished print, not a secret director's cut, of the film.

Screen Daily's Jeremy Kay wrote:

“...Shani's status as someone who is prepared to invest in challenging films that find themselves in challenging situations. Last summer he bought out Kinematic's stake in The Apprentice, enabling Briarcliff Entertainment to come on board as US distributor.”

It also screened at the 2025 New York Film Festival. It was released in 12 select cities on November 28, 2025.

== Reception ==
On the review aggregator website Rotten Tomatoes, 100% of 23 critics' reviews are positive, with an average rating of 8.6/10. Metacritic, which uses a weighted average, assigned the film a score of 92 out of 100, based on 9 critics, indicating "universal acclaim".

Manohla Dargis of The New York Times wrote, "As formally inventive as it is intellectually exciting, it uses both Joseph's life and the W.E.B. DuBois-inspired encyclopedia 'Africana' as jumping-off points in a far-reaching exploration of peoples of African descent. Anchored by that posthumously completed work and by an astonishment of found and original material, the movie playfully, often touchingly surges and leaps across time and borders."

Robert Daniels of RogerEbert.com gave the film four out of four stars and wrote, "This is a challenging, dense, and all-encompassing picture that works best when it's allowed to wash over you."
