= Gwendolyn Ann Smith =

Founder of Transgender Day of Remembrance (born 1967)

Gwendolyn Smith
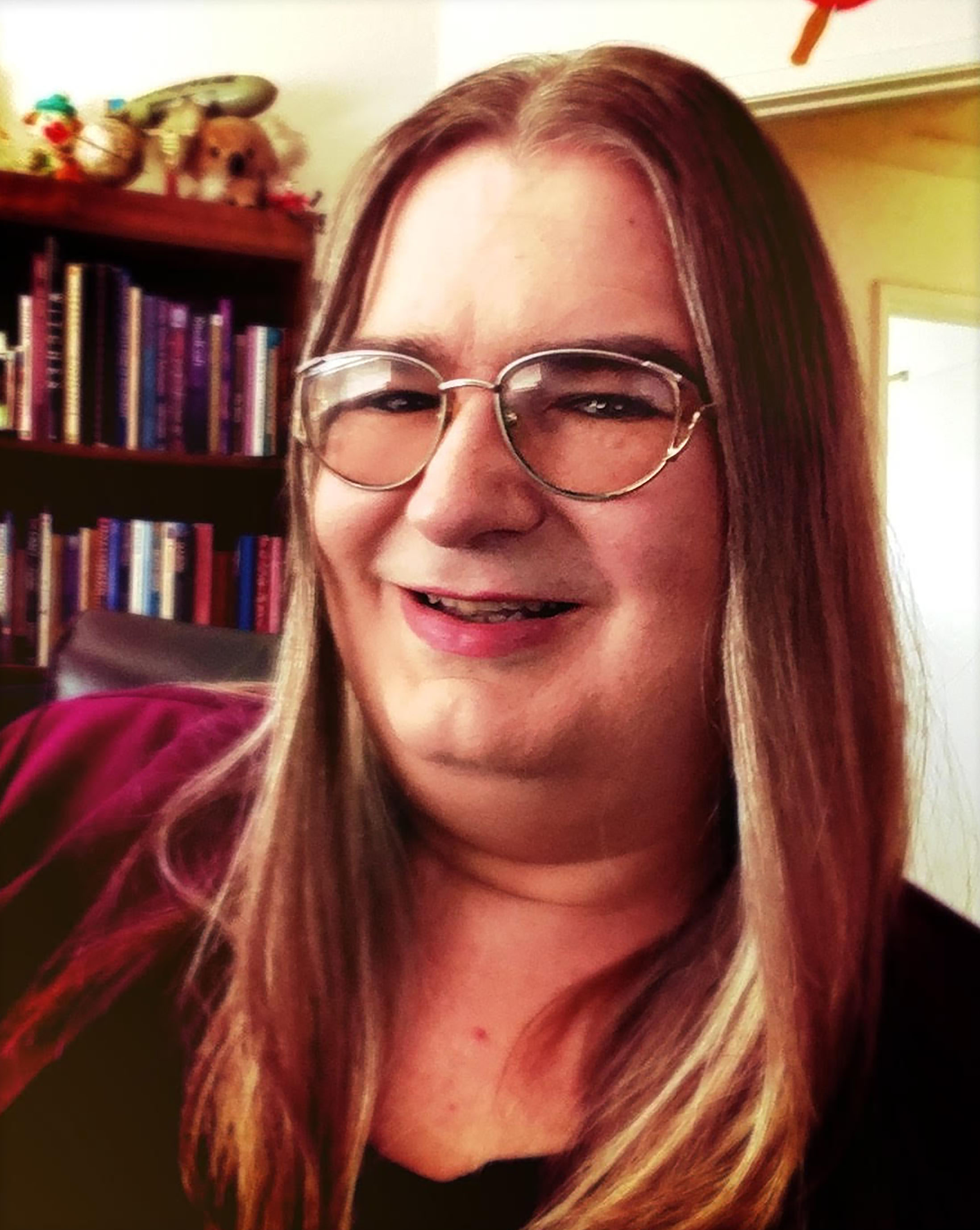
- Smith in 2017
- Born: June 22, 1967 (age 59)
- Occupations: Activist; Writer
- Known for: Transgender rights movement
- Website: http://gwensmith.com/

Gwendolyn Smith (born 22 July 1967) is an American transgender woman from the San Francisco Bay Area who co-founded Transgender Day of Remembrance, a day to memorialize people who have been killed as a result of transphobia. Trans/Active: A Biography of Gwendolyn Ann Smith is a biography about Smith published in July 2017.

== Life ==
Born July 22, 1967, Smith is a transgender activist, writer, and graphic designer. From 1993 to 1998, she ran the Transgender Community Forum on AOL, which was one of the first public online forums for transgender people. Since 2000, she has been a columnist for the Bay Area Reporter. Her column is called "Transmissions." Her essay, "We're all Someone's Freak," is in the Norton Reader 14th edition. She also manages the website Genderfork.

Smith founded a website called Remembering Our Dead, which memorializes people (going back to 1970) who have died as a direct result of hatred and prejudice based on gender. Today the list is hosted on the Transgender Day of Remembrance website, which now (going back to 2007) publishes information about people who have been murdered due to anti-transgender violence. In 2012, Gwendolyn Smith wrote an article for Huffington Post titled, "Transgender Day of Remembrance: Why We Remember". In addition, she is published in Kate Bornstein's book, Gender Outlaws: The Next Generation.

== Transgender Day of Remembrance ==
Smith began Transgender Day of Remembrance in November 1999 to honor Rita Hester, a transgender woman who was murdered in 1998. It is now observed annually on November 20, all over the United States, in over 200 cities, and in different countries. The week leading up to the Day of Remembrance has become Transgender Awareness Week.
