= Kahlil Joseph (filmmaker) =

American filmmaker, music video director and video artist

- Born: Kahlil Davis; 1981 (age 44–45); Seattle, Washington
- Occupations: Filmmaker and Director
- Years active: 2012-present
- Notable work: BLKNWS: Terms & Conditions

Kahlil Davis, known professionally as Kahlil Joseph (born 1981), is an American filmmaker, music video director, and video artist. Joseph is known for creating "intellectually and emotionally dense short films" that center on the experience of African Americans in the United States. He was a 2017 Artadia Awardee.

== Early life ==
Kahlil Joseph was born in Seattle, Washington in 1981. Joseph's father Keven Davis was a prominent sports and entertainment attorney, and his younger brother Noah Davis was a painter and museum curator.

Joseph attended Loyola Marymount University but did not graduate. Joseph's own approach to filmmaking was influenced by his study of the work of Apichatpong Weerasethakul, the Thai director of experimental films.

== Career ==
Joseph got his start in the entertainment industry working as an intern for a post-production house in Los Angeles. He later began working as a Production Assistant on a shoot for music video director Hype Williams.

In 2012, Joseph wrote and directed his first short film, The Mirror Between Us, and in 2013, he gained recognition for writing and directing a short film for Flying Lotus’ song, Until the Quiet Comes. The film was awarded the Short Film Special Jury Prize at the 2013 Sundance Film Festival. Joseph has since directed videos for artists including Kendrick Lamar, FKA Twigs, and Beyonce.

In 2019, Joseph premiered his acclaimed video installation, BLKNWS at the Venice Biennale in the main exhibition. It has since been shown in many different formats and exhibitions, including a theatrical screening at the 2020 Sundance Film Festival. In 2022, it was announced that Joseph would direct an upcoming feature adaptation of BLKNWS for entertainment distribution company A24.

== Commercial work ==
Joseph previously worked as an assistant to the photographer Melodie McDaniel and at the commercial film production company Directors Bureau in Los Angeles. He has directed a commercial for British telecom company O2 and a short film for the luxury brand Kenzo.

Joseph has directed music videos for Blvck Spvde(Black Spade), Flying Lotus, Shabazz Palaces, Sampha, and Kendrick Lamar among others.

Joseph was the original director approached by Beyoncé Knowles to direct the companion film to her 2016 concept album Lemonade. Joseph and Knowles jointly received a BET Award for Video Director of the Year for the track "Sorry". Knowles eventually remixed much of the film with a number of different directors, and has since allowed Joseph's version of Lemonade to be screened only at art museums.

== Museum and gallery exhibitions and commissions ==
In 2014, contemporary artist Kara Walker curated the ICA Philadelphia exhibition Ruffneck Constructivists and included Joseph's 2011 music video for Shabazz Palaces Black Up and the 2012 short film Until the Quiet Comes for the titular Flying Lotus song. In 2015 The Underground Museum presented the exhibition Oracle, displaying works by Joseph and his contemporaries Henry Taylor, Kandis Williams, and Ruby Neri alongside rarities from The Jeremiah Cole Collection of Arts d’Afrique. Joseph's short film m.A.A.d. debuted here for the first time as a double screen projection, and again in the 2016 exhibition Kahlil Joseph: Double Conscience at the Museum of Contemporary Art, Los Angeles. However, the 2015 exhibition Young Blood: Noah Davis, Kahlil Joseph, The Underground Museum at the Frye Art Museum in Seattle, WA, was Joseph's first museum-scale exhibition.

In 2017, Tate Modern commissioned Joseph to create a short film, Black Mary, to debut as part of a special film installation in the final week of the exhibition Soul of a Nation: Art in the Age of Black Power. The six-minute film was inspired by the photography of Roy DeCarava, and features the singer Alice Smith, among others.

Joseph first presented Fly Paper in his 2017 solo exhibition Kahlil Joseph: Shadow Play at New York's New Museum. The film was commissioned by the New Museum in collaboration with The Vinyl Factory, a London-based enterprise. In 2018 Fly Paper made its European debut at The Store X Berlin, and later that year it was shown in London as part of Strange Days: Memories of the Future, presented by the New Museum and The Store X in partnership with The Vinyl Factory. One Day at a Time: Kahlil Joseph's Fly Paper was the final exhibition at The Museum of Contemporary Art's Pacific Design Center in West Hollywood, which closed in 2019, and where Fly Paper was shown for the first time on the West Coast.

== Filmography ==
Kahlil Joseph Filmography
Year	Title	Type	Position
2010	Belhaven Meridian	Short film	Director/cinematographer
2012	The Mirror Between Us	Short film	Writer/director
2013	Dreams Are Colder Than Death	Documentary	Editor
2013	Flying Lotus: Until the Quiet Comes	Music video/short film	Writer/director
2014	Kendrick Lamar: Good kid, m.A.A.d city	Music video/short film	Director
2014	FKA Twigs: Video Girl	Music video	Director
2015	The Reflektor Tapes	Documentary	Director
2016	Lemonade TV Special	TV special	Director
2016	Beyoncé: Love Drought	Music video	Director
2016	Beyoncé: Sorry	Music video	Director
2016	Beyoncé: All Night	Music video	Director
2016	Wizard of the Upper Amazon	Video installation	Creator
2017	Sampha: Process	Music video/short film	Director
2018	Flypaper	Short film	Director
2019	BLKNWS	Video installation	Creator
2023	Circus Maximus	Film	Director
2025	BLKNWS: Terms & Conditions	Film	Director

== Influences ==
Throughout his career, Kahlil Joseph has been very open about the artists he draws inspiration from. He frequently makes direct references to other art in his work and pays tribute to other artists through his work. His acclaimed short film, Until The Quiet Comes, was influenced by the work of Andrei Tarkovsky and Spike Lee. His short, Belhaven Meridian, pays homage to Charles Burnett’s 1977 film Killer of Sheep.
