= Arline Isaacson =

American gay rights activist and lobbyist

Arline Isaacson is an American gay rights activist, political consultant and lobbyist who is the current co-chair of the Massachusetts GLBTQ Political Caucus (formerly the Massachusetts Gay and Lesbian Political Caucus) and the Massachusetts Coalition to Ban Conversion Therapy for Minors. She has been described to be one of the key figures in the legalization of same-sex marriage in Massachusetts.

In 1989, Isaacson was an advocate for a civil rights bill in Massachusetts that prohibited the discrimination of a person on the basis of sexual orientation in employment, housing, and public accommodation. The bill was signed into law on November 15 of that year by Governor Michael Dukakis. In 2003, she served as a lobbyist for MassEquality in the landmark Goodridge v. Department of Public Health Massachusetts Supreme Judicial Court legal case. In 2010, Isaacson opened her own political consultancy firm, Isaacson Political Consultants. Prior to this, she worked as a lobbyist for the Massachusetts Teachers Association, as Director of Governmental Services for the Massachusetts Bay Transportation Authority, as President of TEAM (Tax Equity Alliance for MA), and as Director of Governmental Affairs for the City of Boston. In 2013, Isaacson endorsed Marty Walsh's bid for mayor of Boston. She has been listed as a part of Boston's "50 Most Powerful" residents in Boston magazine.

Isaacson was awarded the Boston Women Communicators' Legacy Award in 2015, the AIDS Action Committee of Massachusetts's Heroes in Action Award in 2018 and The History Project's HistoryMaker Award in 2022.

Isaacson has lived in Beacon Hill, Boston for over 30 years.
