= Hope Giselle =

Transgender activist and author

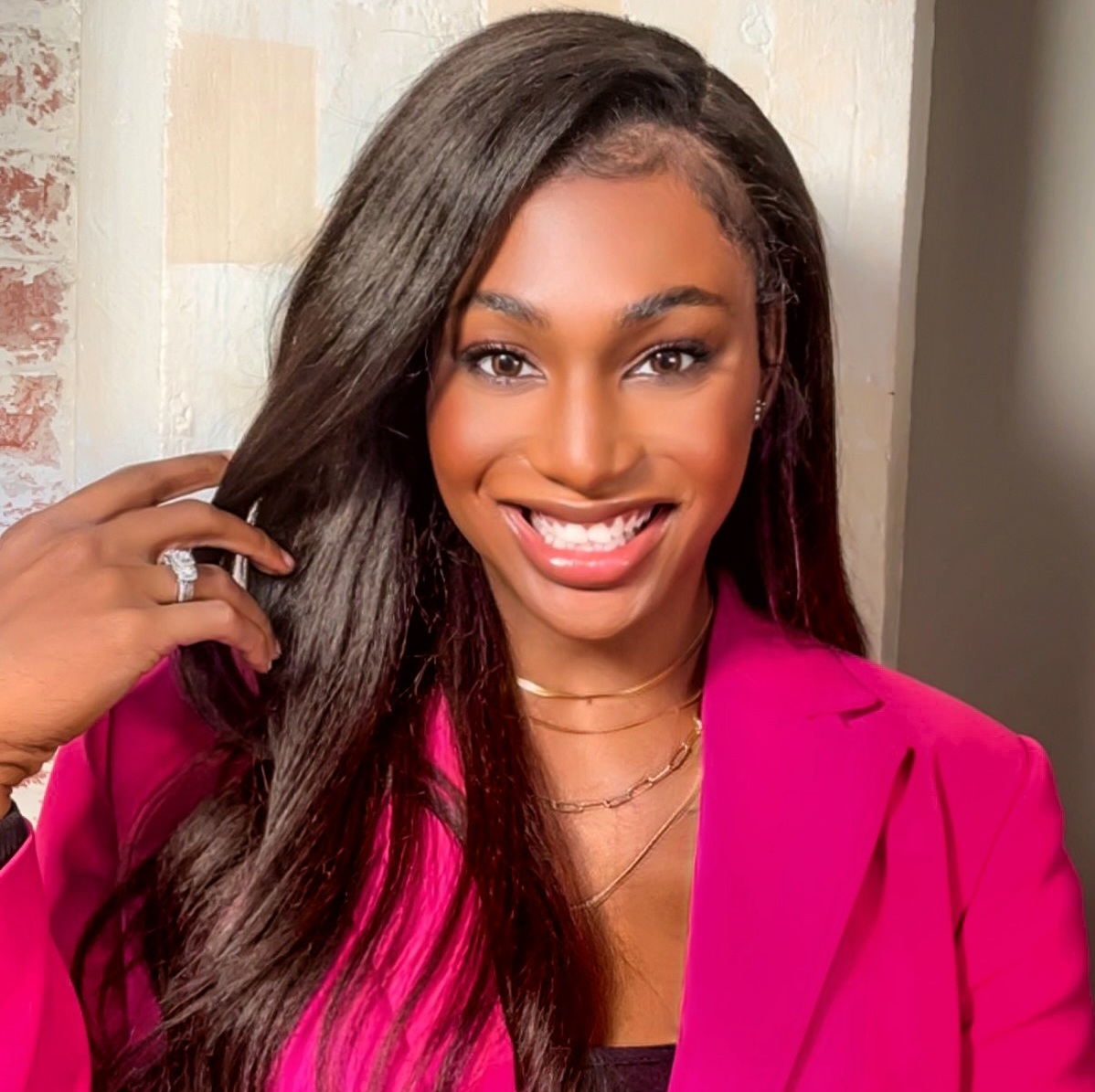
- Born: August 2, 1993 (age 33); Miami, Florida, U.S.
- Education: Alabama State University
- Occupations: Consultant, activist, author
- Website: hopegiselle.com

Hope Giselle (born August 2, 1993) is an African-American transgender activist and author. She is the executive director of the National Trans Visibility March.

== Early life and education ==
Giselle grew up in Miami, Florida. She attended Alabama State University, where she founded the school's first group for LGBTQ students. She graduated as the first openly trans woman at the university to earn both bachelor's and master's degrees in fine arts.

== Career and activism ==
In 2022, Giselle launched AllowMe, a nonprofit that promotes the personal and professional growth of young LGBTQ people of color.

In June 2023, Giselle was a grand marshal of the New York City Pride March.

Giselle was one of the featured speakers at the 60th anniversary of the March on Washington in August 2023, representing the National Black Justice Coalition.

As of October 2023, Giselle serves as the communications director for the GSA Network, and director of training for GET Phluid. As of August 2024, she serves as the executive director, president, and CEO of the National Trans Visibility March.

== Writing ==
In 2018, Giselle published the memoir Becoming Hope: Removing the Disguise. In 2021, she followed up with another memoir, Until I Met Black Men.

== Personal life ==
Giselle has spoken openly about experiencing suicidal ideation in response to bullying during her freshman year of college.
