= Queer History Boston =

American community archives project

- Formation: 1980
- Headquarters: Boston, Massachusetts, U.S.
- Website: queerhistoryboston.org

Queer History Boston (formerly The History Project) is a Boston-based community archives focused on telling and preserving the history of New England LGBTQ people. It is one of the largest independent LGBTQ archives in the United States. They continue to offer programs and collect materials related to the LGBTQ history of New England. The organization changed its name to Queer History Boston in 2025.

== History ==
The History Project was founded in 1980 when several prominent LGBTQ Boston activists and community members, including Libby Bouvier, received a $300 grant from the City of Boston to document Boston LGBTQ history. A number of the original founders were involved with Boston area publication Gay Community News. The founders were advised that including terms such as "gay" and "lesbian" in the organization's name might jeopardize their nonprofit status, so they made the "quieter, safer choice" by choosing a neutral name.

In addition to their work collecting archival materials, the organization has launched several major public history exhibits. In 1996, they curated an exhibit at the Boston Public Library entitled 'Public Faces/Private Lives,' which detailed the lives of LGBTQ Bostonians. The exhibit drew over 50,000 visitors. The contents of this exhibit were later published in 1998 into the book Improper Bostonians.

In 2019, as part of the commemoration of the 50th anniversary of the Stonewall Riots, the History Project, in collaboration with Boston Pride, launched a public history project entitled 'Stonewall 50' to map and commemorate fifty locations connected to Boston's LGBTQ history. These locations, some extant and others since closed, were commemorated in person with banners or posters and virtually on a digital map that included information about each location and photographs from the History Project's archives. Locations featured in this project included Jacques Cabaret, Fenway Health's main building, Boston City Hall and the Old West Church. The History Project by the Boston Preservation Alliance for this project in 2021.

In September 2025, the organization announced that it had changed its name to Queer History Boston. According to their blog post, the original name effectively closeted the organization by obscuring its true purpose. The new name is intended to make the organization and its mission "visible, accessible, and open."

== HistoryMaker Award ==
Each year, Queer History Boston honors chosen community members and organizations with the HistoryMaker award to recognize their impact. The award was first given in 2009. Honorees include:

- Arline Isaacson
- Nancy Nangeroni
- John Ward, founder of GLBTQ Legal Advocates & Defenders
- Combahee River Collective
- Thea L. James
- Barney Frank
- Byron Rushing
- Mary Bonauto
- Larry Kessler
