= Mason J. Dunn =

American lawyer, educator, and LGBTQ rights advocate

- Born: 1985 (age 40–41); Southern California
- Education: University of New Hampshire School of Law
- Occupations: Attorney, educator, & LGBTQ+ rights advocate
- Employer: Massachusetts LGBT Chamber of Commerce
- Known for: Transgender activism
- Website: https://malgbtcc.org/about/team/mason-dunn/

Mason J. Dunn (born 1985) is an American lawyer, educator, and LGBTQ+ rights advocate based in Massachusetts (MA). Dunn is known for their long-standing work in transgender rights and public policy, including co-chairing the "Yes on 3" campaign, which successfully preserved transgender protections in MA's public accommodations law. They currently serve as the Director of Education and Research at the Massachusetts LGBT Chamber of Commerce, where they provide inclusivity training and resources for businesses across the state. Dunn is a nonbinary, trans masculine, and bisexual/queer identifying Jewish person who uses he/him or they/them pronouns.

== Early life and education ==
Dunn is originally from Southern California. Assigned female at birth, Dunn had experienced challenges related to gender identity throughout adolescence. As an 18-year-old undergraduate student, Dunn discovered that the term "transgender" provided a framework for understanding his experiences. After encountering a lack of awareness about transgender and gender-nonconforming identities among faculty and staff, Dunn conducted research on these topics and began lecturing in various university courses. His advocacy expanded to launching a Safe Zone project, leading the campus Gay-Straight Alliance, and collaborating with statewide student advocacy groups. During this time, Dunn also experienced difficulty accessing trans-competent healthcare resources, including mental health support and treatment for severe endometriosis, which became life-threatening after he was repeatedly denied a hysterectomy.

Dunn eventually relocated to New England and attended the University of New Hampshire (UNH) School of Law, graduating in 2012 with his JD. At UNH, Dunn was part of the Daniel Webster Scholar Honors Program, which provided practical legal training, and completed internships with the American Civil Liberties Union (ACLU) of New Hampshire and the New Hampshire Human Rights Commission. Dunn is a licensed attorney and a member of the New Hampshire Bar Association, although he is currently listed as retired.

== Career and activism ==
Dunn has been involved in LGBTQ+ advocacy for over 15 years, with a particular focus on advancing gender equity. In 2013, they became the Executive Director of the Massachusetts Transgender Political Coalition. In this role, Dunn advocated for non-discrimination protections, including the 2016 addition of public accommodations to MA's civil rights laws.

In 2018, Dunn co-chaired the “Yes on 3” campaign, which successfully defended MA's trans-inclusive public accommodations law through a statewide referendum in the nation's first ever statewide vote on transgender rights. Following this, he joined Keshet in 2019 as the organization’s first Director of Advocacy, focusing on intersectional LGBTQ+ rights within the Jewish community. From 2020-2023, Dunn served as the Deputy Director of the Division of Education and Training at Fenway Health's National LGBTQIA+ Health Education Center. In 2023, Dunn joined the Massachusetts LGBT Chamber of Commerce as Director of Education and Research, overseeing LGBTQ+ inclusivity training for businesses. In 2025, Dunn became the executive director of the Planned Parenthood Advocacy Fund of Massachusetts.

Dunn is an adjunct faculty member at the University of New Hampshire, where they teach in the Communications Department. Dunn also serves on the boards of The Equality Federation and the Massachusetts LGBTQ Youth Commission. He is a former vice-chair of the Tewksbury Diversity, Equity, and Inclusion Committee.

== Honors and awards ==
Dunn has received several awards in recognition of their LGBTQ+ advocacy, including:

- Massachusetts LGBTQ+ Leader from MassLive (2023)
- The Kidder Award for LGBTQ+ Inclusivity in Education from the University of New Hampshire (2018)
- Mr. New England Leather (2023) (under the name Pup Scout).
- The Advocate for Justice Award from the Jewish Alliance for Law and Social Action

== See also ==
- LGBT rights in Massachusetts
- Transgender rights movement
- Same-sex marriage in Massachusetts
- List of LGBT rights organizations
