= Thea L. James =

American emergency medical physician

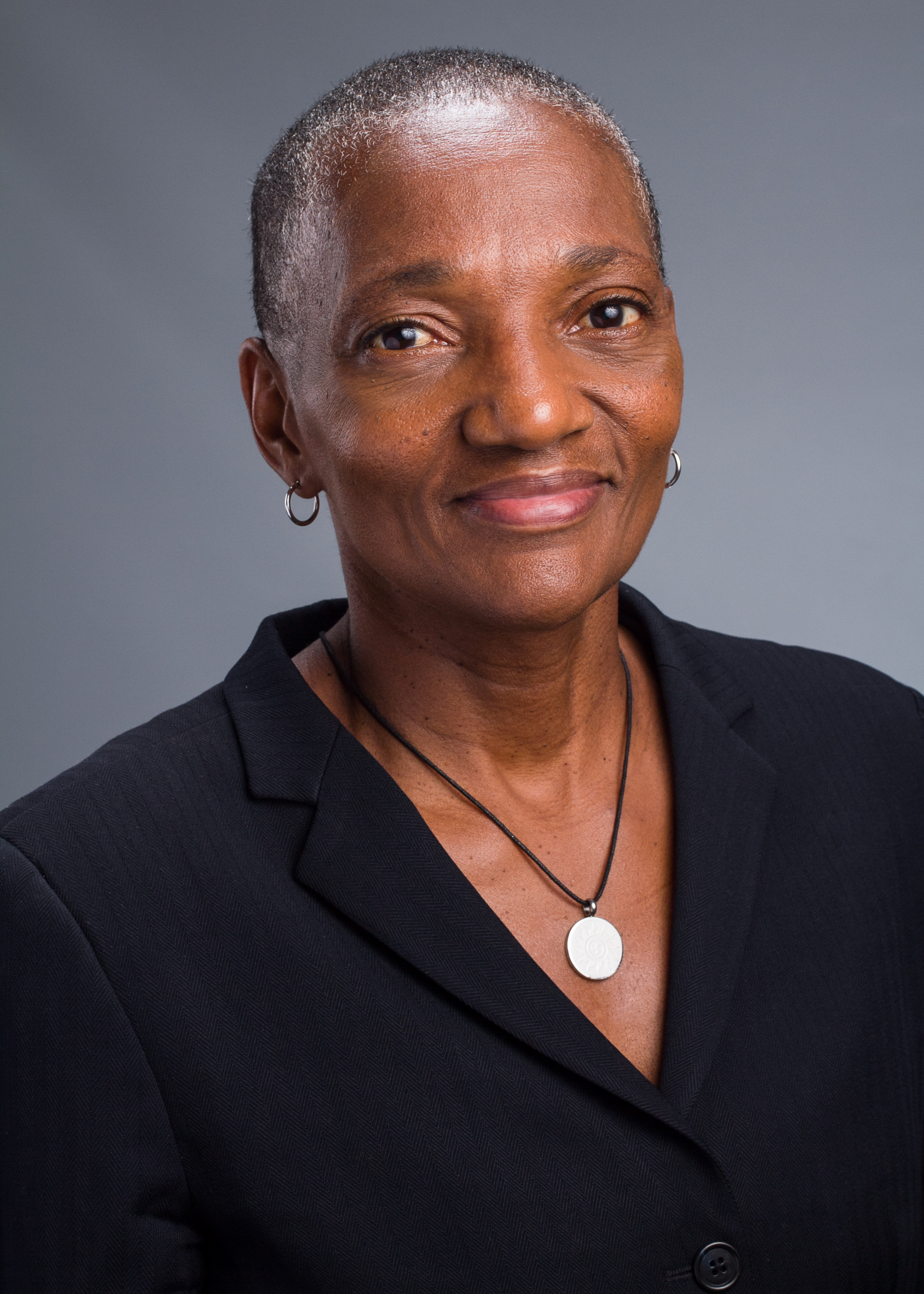
- James in 2012
- Born: Alexandria, Virginia
- Education: Hampton University, Georgetown University School of Medicine, Boston University
- Scientific career
- Fields: Emergency Medicine, Public Health
- Workplaces: Boston Medical Center; Boston University School of Medicine

Thea L. James is an American emergency medical physician as well as an associate professor, associate chief medical officer, and vice president of mission at the Boston Medical Center (BMC) in Boston, Massachusetts.

She serves as director of the Violence Intervention Advocacy Program, and was supervising medical officer on the Boston Disaster Medical Assistance Team under the department of Health and Human Services. At BMC, she leads efforts to manage and strengthen partnerships with local, state, and national organizations, driving innovative and effective care models for patients and communities.

== Early life and education ==
James was born in Alexandria, Virginia. James received her BS and MS from Hampton University. She then studied at Georgetown University School of Medicine from 1987-1991, receiving an MD. In 1991, she moved to Boston to pursue a residency in emergency medicine at Boston City Hospital, which is now part of BMC and was affiliated with Boston University School of Medicine, eventually becoming Chief Resident. James' upbringing outside of Washington, D.C., where the federal government serves as an economic anchor for employment, informed her later work in Boston with the awareness that economic anchoring could translate to health in the community. James has worked at Boston Medical Center for her entire career, following her residency which she completed in 1995

== Career ==
After residency, James began practicing emergency medicine at Boston Medical Center in Boston, Massachusetts. She became an associate professor of emergency medicine at and later the president of the medical and dental staff from 2010 to 2012. In 2015, James was appointed vice president of mission at Boston Medical Center. With a critical focus on establishing equity for patients and communities, James also became an assistant dean of diversity and multicultural affairs at the Boston University School of Medicine. Her goal was to move away from short-term, "downstream" solutions toward long-term, "upstream" solutions more likely to foster autonomy and economic stability.

James has extensively focused on addressing violence and trauma in communities. She is the co-founder and director of the Violence Intervention Advocacy Program at Boston Medical Center to provide trauma informed care. She started this program in 2006 based in the emergency room, and her experiences highlighted the need to address factors upstream of the emergency room in order to alter the quality of life-course that in turn prevents violence and trauma in her patients. For her work in addressing community violence, James was appointed by the Obama Administration to serve on the National Task Force on Children Exposed to Violence.

As a leader in the medical field, James currently serves as the chair of the Licensing Committee of the Massachusetts Board of Registration in Medicine. She has also served in several leadership positions within the Society for Academic Emergency Medicine (SAEM) and is currently an appointed member of the SAEM Women in Academic Medicine Emergency Task Force.

She has also spoken at several universities, including the University of Washington, where she presented at the 2023 Grand Rounds and discussed Boston Medical Center’s efforts to reduce health disparities.

=== Global emergency medicine ===
James promotes health equity and addresses public health needs in communities beyond the Boston Area. For 20 years, James travelled to Haiti, along with other colleagues in emergency medicine, to build sustainable public health infrastructures through grass-roots community partnerships. As a Supervising Medical Officer on the Boston Disaster Medical Assistance Team under the department of Health and Human Services, James has provided medical support and leadership after several disasters including 9/11, Hurricane Katrina, Bam in Iran, and the earthquake in Port-au-Prince in Haiti. One day after Haiti's earthquake in 2010, James flew down to provide support and leadership alongside her colleagues. She also co-founded the non-profit Unified for Global Healing and is a member of the Board of Directors of Equal Health. Equal Health works with local partners in Haiti to create strong, sustainable medical and nursing education systems. James partners with colleagues and community organizations with a goal for patients and communities to be able to fully participate in the economy, which leads to the ability to afford housing, healthy food, education and wellness.

== Awards and honors ==
- 2008: David H. Mulligan Award for Public Service
- 2011: Attorney General Eric Holder's National Task Force on Children Exposed to Violence, Member
- 2012: The Boston Business Journal, Healthcare Hero Award
- 2012: Suffolk County District Attorney's Role Model Award
- 2014: Schwartz Center, Compassionate Care Award
- 2015: The Boston Business Journal, Healthcare Hero Award
- 2015: Boston Chamber of Commerce, Pinnacle Award
- 2016: Barney L. Simms “Trailblazer” Award by Atlanta Victim Assistance Inc.
- 2017: Jerome Klein Award for Physician Excellence
- 2019: Massachusetts Public Health Association, Health Equity Champion
- 2020: Fenway Health: Dr. Susan M. Love Award
- 2020: The History Project, History Maker Award
- 2020: American College of Emergency Physicians, Thea James Social Emergency Medicine Award

== Select works and publications ==
- James, Thea (September 2000). "Women in Academic Emergency Medicine/Diversity Interest Group Position Statement". Academic Emergency Medicine. 7 (9): 1032–1035. doi:10.1111/J.1553-2712.2000.TB02096.X. PMID 11044000. Wikidata ()
- James, Thea L.; Feldman, James; Mehta, Supriya D. (February 2006). "Physician Variability in History Taking When Evaluating Patients Presenting with Chest Pain in the Emergency Department". Academic Emergency Medicine. 13 (2): 147–152. doi:10.1111/J.1553-2712.2006.TB01663.X. PMID 16436792. Wikidata ()
- James, Thea L.; Aschkenasy, Miriam; Eliseo, Laura J.; Olshaker, Jonathan; Mehta, Supriya D. (2009-05-01). "Response to Hepatitis A Epidemic: Emergency Department Collaboration with Public Health Commission". Journal of Emergency Medicine. 36 (4): 412–416. doi:10.1016/J.JEMERMED.2007.10.001. ISSN 0736-4679. PMID 18359602. Wikidata ()
- James, Thea L.; Bibi, Salma; Langlois, Breanne K.; Dugan, Elizabeth; Mitchell, Patricia M.; Mello, Michael J. (July 2014). "Boston Violence Intervention Advocacy Program: A Qualitative Study of Client Experiences and Perceived Effect". Academic Emergency Medicine. 21 (7): 742–751. doi:10.1111/ACEM.12409. PMID 25039818.
- James T. The Mission of Safety Net Hospitals: Charity or Equity?. J Clin Ethics. 2018;29(3):237‐239.
