= National Trans Visibility Day =

Brazilian annual event of transgender visibility

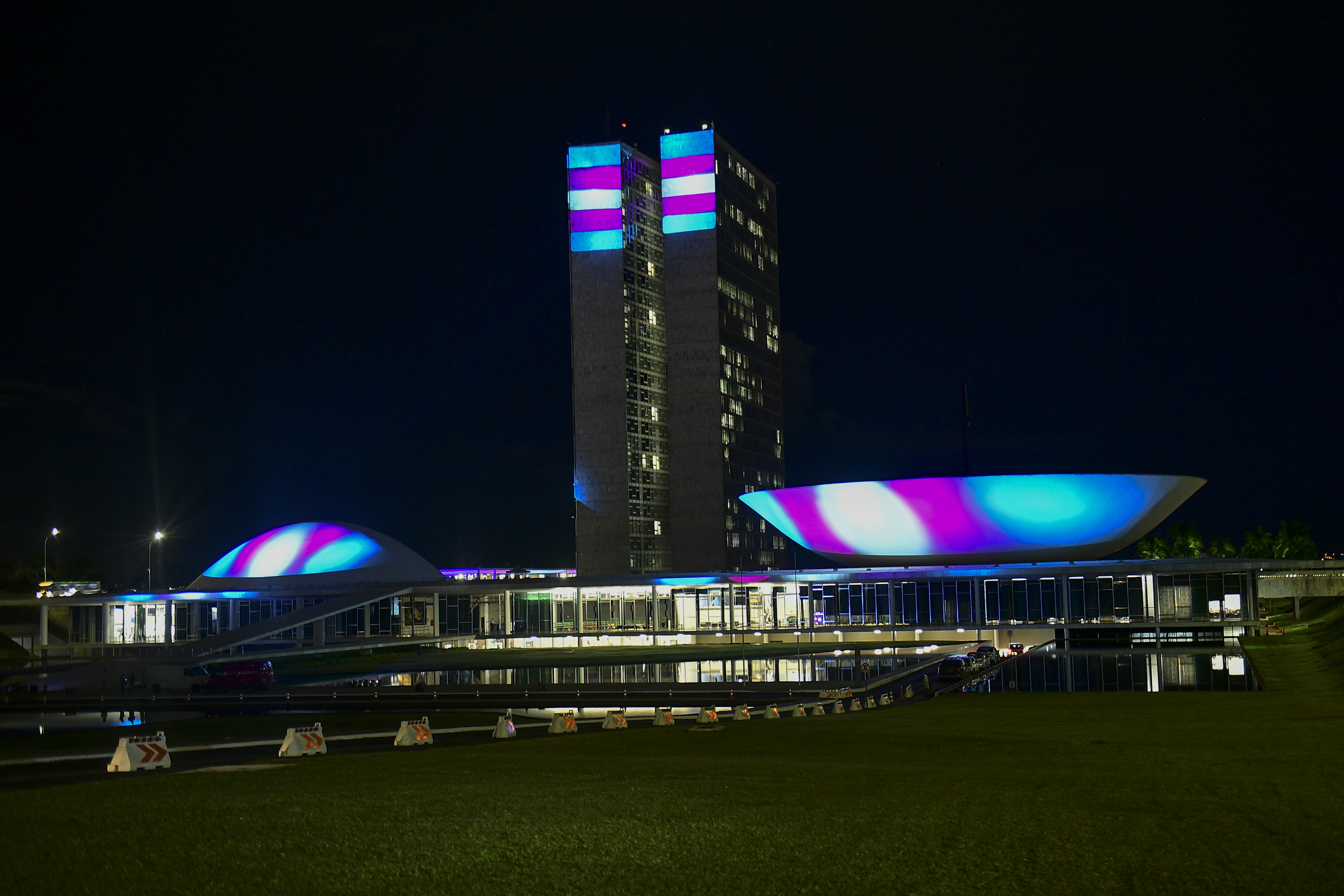
- The Brazilian National Congress illuminated with the colors of the trans flag on 29 January 2025
- Official name: Dia da Visibilidade Trans
- Observed by: Brazil
- Type: National
- Date: 29 January
- Frequency: Annual
- First time: 2004; 22 years ago
- Related to: Transgender Day of Remembrance; International Transgender Day of Visibility

National Trans Visibility Day (Brazilian Portuguese: Dia Nacional da Visibilidade Trans) is a date celebrated annually on January 29th, and since 2004 it has celebrated pride and awareness about transgender and travesti people in Brazil.

On 29 January 2004, a group of transgender activists went to the National Congress to demonstrate in favor of the "Travesti e Respeito" (lit. 'Travesti and Respect') campaign. This nationwide campaign was developed by leaders of the transgender movement in partnership with the National STI and AIDS Program of the Ministry of Health. At the time, the Ministry sought to intensify its actions to combat sexually transmitted infections (STIs), conditions frequently associated with prostitution. The launch of the campaign was considered an important event in the fight for transgender rights in Brazil.

== See also ==
- International Transgender Day of Visibility
