= Oasis Contemporary Jazz Awards =

Jazz award in the United States

The Oasis Contemporary Jazz Awards (Oasis Music Awards) is a United States based award presented annually to recognize achievement in the smooth-jazz music format as well as Jazz Fusion and other sectors of the contemporary jazz genre. The award categories are similar in nature to the Grammys, American Music Awards, Country Music Association Awards. Awards are given for Song of the Year, CD of the Year, Male and Female Artist of the Year. Also, an award is presented to the player of the year on saxophone, piano, drums, bass, or guitar.

The three previous Oasis Music Awards shows were virtual all-star concerts in 2000, 2001 and 2002 with The Rippingtons, Rick Braun, Jeff Lorber, Richard Elliot, Peter White, Boney James, Kirk Whalum, Herb Alpert, Dave Koz, Al Jarreau, Bob James, Keiko Matsui, Brenda Russell, David Benoit, Euge Groove, Brian Culbertson, Marc Antoine, Steve Cole, Joyce Cooling, the late Wayman Tisdale, and more, all performing.

The 2011 Oasis Contemporary Jazz Awards Show was to be held in San Diego, California over the weekend of March 10–13, 2011. Larry Seacat and Bill Paddock were producing the show. The show was cancelled.

== History ==
The Oasis Smooth Jazz Awards were conceived in 1999 by radio executive Rick Parrish, and created by Parrish, Bill Paddock, and concert promoter Jerry Thompson. They were first announced at the June 1999 Radio and Records Convention in Los Angeles. The name “Oasis Awards” was chosen because it is the single most common name associated with the format. The first show was held January 28, 2000, at Bass Hall in Ft Worth, Texas. Originally, the awards were called the Oasis Smooth Jazz Awards.

=== 2000 show ===
Saxophonist Dave Koz hosted the “First Annual” Oasis Smooth Jazz Awards Show. Jeff Lorber served as Music Director and put together the back-up band of mostly session players who would support all performances at the show. Performers and Presenters included: Dave Koz, David Benoit, Wayman Tisdale, Herb Alpert, Rick Braun, Richard Elliot, Jeff Lorber, and Grady Nichols, among others. TV personality Cameron Smith assisted Dave Koz in the hosting. The awards portion of the show was an alternating of performances and award presentations. Note: Grover Washington, Jr, was to be part of the show but he died of a heart attack at the CBS Studios in New York City on December 16, just six weeks before the show. Several performers played together in tribute. A panel of industry experts chose the seven nominees in each category. Voting on the nominees was then done online by the public. The various smooth jazz radio stations and artists promoted the voting process nationally.

=== 2001 show ===
The 2001 show was moved to The Chicago Theater in Chicago. The theater was sold out, 3,500 seats, three weeks in advance. The show was Saturday, March 3. Performers and presenters included Dave Koz, Keiko Matsui (who flew in from Tokyo), Bob James, Bona Fide, Jeff Golub, Brian Culbertson, Paul Taylor, Euge Groove, Marion Meadows, Chuck Loeb, Larry Carlton, Jeff Kashiwa, Joseph Quevedo, Steve Cole, Peter White, and Brenda Russell. Again, Dave Koz and Jeff Lorber served as Host and Musical Director, respectively. The show was videotaped for BET and BET On Jazz networks. Their national sponsor was Heineken. Michael Fagien, publisher of JAZZIZ magazine, was Chairman of the Advisory Committee.

=== 2002 show ===
After the 2001 show, Paddock and Thompson sold their interests to Parrish and his brother. The Parrishes then moved the show to the Golden Hall Theater in San Diego. The date of the third show was March 2, 2002. A KIFM/San Diego radio personality, Lenny B, served as Executive Producer. Dave Koz and Brenda Russell co-hosted. Al Jarreau, Brian Culbertson, Rick Braun, Keiko Matsui, Peter White, Kirk Whalum, Boney James, Fattburger, Wayman Tisdale, Gabriela Anders, Boz Scaggs and Craig Chaquico were among the performers and presenters. The show was again taped for BET and BET On Jazz networks. This year for the first time ever, the show was broadcast nationally on all participating smooth jazz radio stations. About 3,400 attended the San Diego event.

=== 2003 show ===
After the 2002 show, the Parrishes sold to ShoCorp, a division of SCI Event Group, in Los Angeles. ShoCorp announced that the 2003 show (4th Annual National Smooth Jazz Awards) would be presented June 18, 2003 at the Wiltern Theater in downtown Los Angeles. Scheduled to perform were Al Jarreau, Dave Koz, Gerald Albright, Euge Groove, Freddie Ravel, David Benoit, Jeff Lorber, Peter White, Richard Elliot, Jeff Golub, Rick Braun, Steve Cole and Norman Brown.

Another announcement came from ShopCorp on April 21, 2003 – The 4th annual National Smooth Jazz Awards ceremony scheduled for June 18 at The Wiltern in Los Angeles has been cancelled. The actual awards for this year will be given out but without the ceremony. Tim Goodwin President/Executive Producer of ShoCorp's who was to handle the event says, "Due to our current world climate, several of the valuable participants in this endeavor are apprehensive about rising to the commitment level that is required to make this event a success." Carol Archer of R&R magazine says nominations are currently being tabulated by the magazine and will be announced tomorrow with voting to commence immediately after. Voting will end one week prior to the June 18 awards announcement. Goodwin says he plans to put a ceremony together for next year's awards. Subsequently, winners were announced although there was no ceremony or show. This was the last public announcement from ShoCorp. Show tickets never went on sale.

== 2011 Oasis Contemporary Jazz Awards ==
The 2011 Awards Weekend (March 10–13, 2011 in San Diego, CA) had scheduled shows at the Balboa Theatre on Thursday, March 10 and the Awards Show at the San Diego Civic Theater on Saturday, March 12. The show was unfortunately canceled due to lack of ticket sales.

== Compilation CDs ==
Two compilation cds, Oasis Smooth Jazz Awards Collection, Volumes 1 and 2 have been released by Native Language Records.
