= Old Central High School (Pittsfield, Massachusetts) =

- U.S. National Register of Historic Places
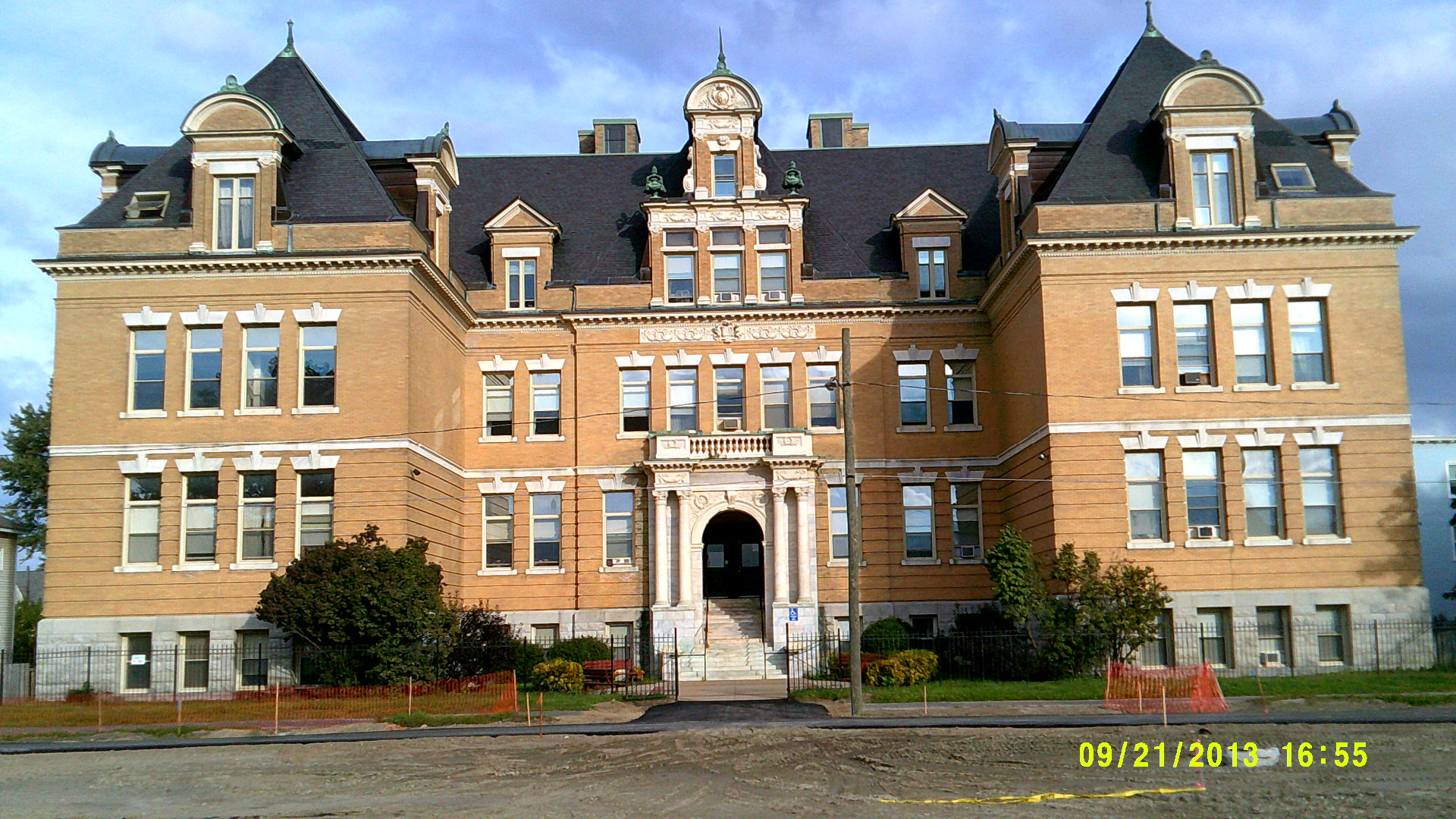

- Location within Massachusetts Location within the United States
- Location: Pittsfield, Massachusetts
- Coordinates: 42°27′3″N 73°14′56″W
- Built: 1898
- Architect: Pierce & Brun
- Architectural style: Beaux-Arts
- NRHP reference No.: 80000428
- Added to NRHP: August 6, 1980

The Old Central High School is a historic school building at 99 2nd Street in Pittsfield, Massachusetts. Built in 1898 as "Pittsfield High School" NOT Central, and served as such until 1931 when it became "Central Junior High School", it is one of the most architecturally elaborate school buildings in the city. The building was listed on the National Register of Historic Places in 1980. It is now residential housing.

== Description and history ==
Pittsfield's Old Central High School is located northeast of the city center, on the east side of the old town common. It is a U-shaped 3 1/2-story masonry structure, finished primarily in cream-colored brick, with marble trim and terra cotta detailing. It has a hipped roof pierced by dormers, and is set on a high sandstone foundation. Its centered entrance is flanked by Corinthian columns and topped by a full entablature with balustrade. The interior design echoes the color schemes of the exterior.

The land on which the school stands was originally part of Pittsfield's first cemetery, whose graves were relocated to the Pittsfield Cemetery on Wahconah Street between 1850 and 1872. When the city's previous high school burned down in 1895, the city held a design competition for its replacement. Of 130 designs submitted, the city selected one by the New York City firm of Pierce & Brun. It was completed in 1898 at a cost of $200,000, well over the $135,000 it had been estimated to cost. A new high school was built in 1931, after which this building became a junior high school. It sat vacant from 1953 to 1959, and in 1961 became the first home of Berkshire Community College. It has since been converted to residences.

== See also ==
- National Register of Historic Places listings in Berkshire County, Massachusetts
