= Trans march =

Annual transgender community marches

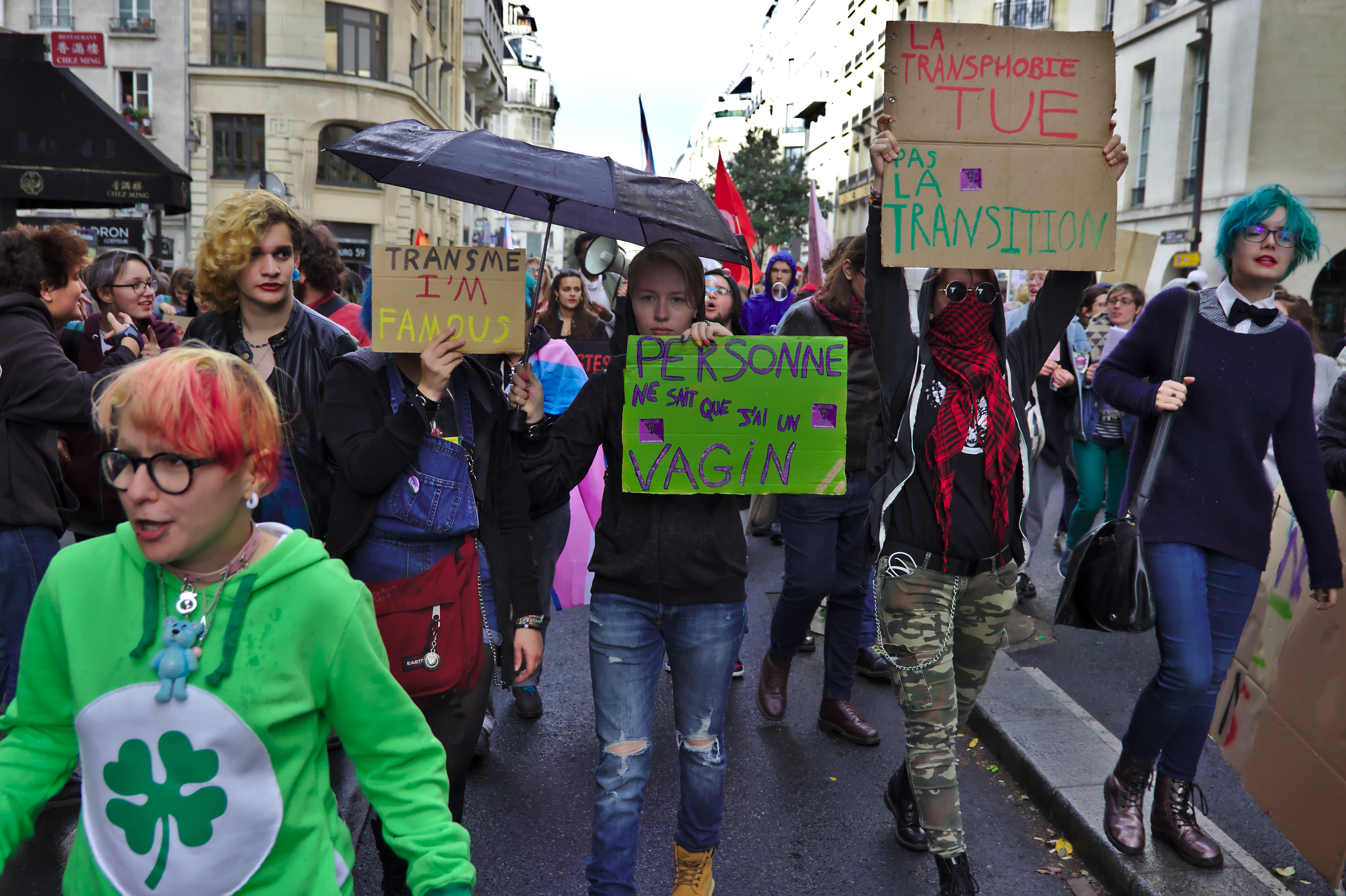
Scene from French trans and intersex March "Existrans" 2017

Since the late 20th century, annual marches, protests or gatherings have been held around the world for transgender issues. They often take place during the time of local Pride parades for LGBTQ people. These events are frequently organized by trans communities to build community, address human rights struggles, and create visibility.

== ExisTransInter march Paris ==
Created in 1997 is the Existrans march in Paris. Since 2007 the march also includes intersex demands. The current name is "ExisTransInter, la marche des personnes trans et intersexes et de celles qui les soutiennent" ("ExisTransInter, the march of the trans and intersex persons and those who support them").

== Early U.S. Trans Prides ==
In 1997, trans Seattleites hosted a Trans Pride march and rally at Seattle Central College in Capitol Hill, Seattle. Annual trans pride events began again in 2013 organized by Gender Justice League, and have continued since.

The 2009 logo of the San Francisco Trans March

The San Francisco Trans March is an annual gathering and protest march in San Francisco, California, that takes place on the Friday night of Pride weekend, the last weekend of June. It is a trans and gender non-conforming and inclusive event in the same spirit of the original gay pride parades and dyke marches. It is one of the few large annual transgender events in the world and has likely been the largest transgender event since its inception in June 2004. The purpose of the event is to increase visibility, activism and acceptance of all gender-variant people.

== Toronto Trans March ==
The Toronto Trans March was founded in 2009 by Karah Mathiason. The annual event typically takes place on the Friday of Toronto Pride Week. The trans community in Toronto had seen resistance for years to the idea of a trans march, and in 2009 Karah Mathiason decided to create the march for herself.

In 2009, Toronto Pride attempted to confine the newly formed Trans March to the sidewalks of Church Street up to Wellesley Street. Instead, participants took to the streets and marched past the barriers on Wellesley Street. Since 2009, Toronto Pride has consistently stood in the way of the Trans March, often trying to confine it to a small portion of Church Street while the Toronto Dyke March and Toronto Pride Parade march down Yonge Street.

In 2012, Toronto Pride attempted to restrict the Trans March from Norman Jewison Park down Church Street, where vending booths were set up and pedestrians were still walking around. The "official" march received relatively little attention and occurred amidst oblivious pedestrians until it reached Wood Street. Upon arriving at Wood Street, marchers who were aware of alternative plans split off and marched down Yonge Street to Dundas Avenue.

In 2013, Toronto Pride again attempted to mislead marchers, but this time activists prevailed. The Toronto Trans March began at Norman Jewison Park and marched down Yonge Street to Allan Gardens on Sherbourne and Carlton. It was the largest unified Trans March that has occurred in Toronto to date. Between 1000 and 2000 people are believed to have marched in the Toronto Trans March 2013.

=== Community conflicts ===
During the organisation of the Toronto Trans March 2013, a conflict occurred following a decision made during one organising meeting to accept a request by the LGBT Consultative Committee of the Toronto Police Services to march in the Trans March. Many in the community objected to a police contingent of the march. They believed that it disregarded the facts of police brutality and harassment against trans people in Toronto. In the end, a community letter was presented to the LGBT Consultative Committee and the contingent did not march.

== London Trans+ Pride ==
In London, the first London Trans+ Pride march was held on 14 September 2019. In July 2026, the march drew an estimated 150,000 participants.

== Other cities ==
In 2007, a trans march was started in Minneapolis–St. Paul, United States.

In Philadelphia, the first Philly Trans March was held in 2010.

In São Paulo, Brazil, the first Trans March was held in 2018.

In Japan, the first Trans March was held in Shinjuku, Tokyo by Transgender Japan (TGJP) on 20 November 2021. About 500 people participated. The second Trans March is planned to be held on 12 November 2022.

On March 28, 2026, the first Trans and Non-Binary March (in Spanish, Marcha Trans y No Binaria) in Peru took place on the streets of Lima, with a hundred people asserting their rights in the context of the electoral campaign for the 2026 general elections.

== See also ==
- Dyke march
- International Transgender Day of Visibility
- List of LGBT awareness days
- List of LGBT events
- National Trans Visibility March
- Transgender flag
- Transgender rights movement
- Trans October
