= National Trans Visibility March =

The National Trans Visibility March is an annual march and rally that first took place in Washington, D.C., on September 28, 2019, to call for federal recognition of transgender people and transgender rights in the United States. Activists called for Congress to pass the Equality Act, which would add gender identity to the Civil Rights Act.

The first annual march was led by Marissa Miller and Luckie Alexander. Featured speakers included trans rights activist and actress Angelica Ross, trans rights activist Ashlee Marie Preston and Human Rights Campaign president Alphonso David. Over 5,600 people attended the march.

The 2020 march was held mostly online due to the COVID-19 pandemic. The 2021 march took place on October 9, 2021, in Orlando, Florida. The 2022 march took place on November 5, 2022, in West Hollywood, California.

== See also ==
- Equality Act (United States)
- National Trans Visibility Day
- Trans March
- Transgender rights in the United States
