= Transgender Awareness Week =

Celebration leading to Transgender Day of Remembrance

- Observed by: Transgender community and supporters
- Date: November
- Duration: 1 week
- Frequency: Annual
- Related to: Transgender Day of Remembrance, International Transgender Day of Visibility

Transgender Awareness Week, observed from November 13 to November 19, is a one-week celebration leading up to the Transgender Day of Remembrance (TDoR), which memorializes victims of transphobic violence. TDoR occurs annually on November 20, when transgender advocates raise awareness of the transgender community through education and advocacy activities.

The first week of November typically begins with third parties hosting events at venues (including online venues) surrounding a main central venue, followed the second week by more venues at the main area showcasing more and more in-depth events. The purpose of Transgender Awareness Week is to educate about transgender and gender non-conforming people and the issues associated with their transition or identity.

== Background ==
Transgender people face many issues within their community that cause them to feel they are in danger and unsafe. A survey found that 50% of transgender people report having been raped or assaulted by a romantic partner. Transgender people have been murdered simply for being trans, in addition to their loved ones and/or friends because of being involved with them. Some trans women were arrested for fighting back against their attacker. Trans people and supporters have formally united with one another and took stands against discrimination towards trans people by holding protests. Transgender Awareness Week was established in response to these killings and imprisonments in order to highlight the challenges faced by trans people.

== Events ==
Participants in Transgender Awareness Week are encouraged to organize events that serve as educational opportunities to the community. One possible event is the screening of a trans-themed movie, such as the film Paris is Burning, which highlights gay and transgender ball culture in New York City. Another educational event is the personal testimonies of local transgender people and the issues they face because of their gender identity. "I AM: Trans People Speak" is a collection of videos regarding transgender people's personal testimonies that could be shown in place of a live testimony. Other events have revolved around the discussion of trans-themed books or the observation of a trans-themed art show or performance.

In San Francisco, Transgender Awareness Week was expanded to cover the entire month of November starting in 2018 by Mayor London Breed and Clair Farley, director of the city's Office of Transgender Initiatives. In November 2019, each member of the San Francisco Board of Supervisors gave a commendation to a member of the trans community.

== Trans demographics in the United States ==
A study released by the Williams Institute in August 2025 found that about 1% of the U.S. population (2.8 million) are transgender or nonbinary. Their study in 2016 had concluded that 0.6% of the U.S. population (1.4 million people) identified as transgender. In 2008, only 8% of Americans reported knowing or working with someone who is transgender; by 2015, this had doubled to 16%, according to a Harris poll, and by 2021, this had risen to 42% according to a Pew poll.

== See also ==
- Transgender history
- Transgender rights movement
- List of LGBTQIA+ awareness periods
