= Massachusetts Transgender Political Coalition =

- The Massachusetts Transgender Political Coalition logo

- U.S. State of Massachusetts
- Founded: September 2001
- Location: Boston, Massachusetts
- Region served: Massachusetts
- Key people: Mason Dunn, executive director
- Website: masstpc.org

The 'Massachusetts Transgender Political Coalition (MTPC) is an organization dedicated to ending discrimination on the basis of gender identity and gender expression. The MTPC educates the public, lobbies state and local government, and encourages political activism.

The MTPC professes to work guided by the following values: "Equal rights and institutional responsibility; working against all forms of oppression; building broad-based participation and community power; developing leaders and building coalitions; drawing strength from diverse experiences and identities; being informed by our history and elders; growing through challenge and critique; being inclusive of those who cannot be fully visible, and accountability to the communities for which we work."

MTPC was started by transgender activists and allies in September 2001. In early 2002, MTPC members began advocating for non-discrimination ordinances on the basis of gender identity and gender expression in Boston. The ordinance passed in October 2002 with a 9-1 vote. In 2003, MTPC members began advocating for a similar ordinance in Northampton, Massachusetts, which passed in December 2005.

In the summer of 2006, MTPC began developing a campaign for a statewide gender identity/gender expression non-discrimination bill. The legislation to outlaw discrimination in Massachusetts on the basis of "gender identity or expression" was introduced on Jan 10, 2007, by lead sponsors Representative Carl Sciortino and Representative Byron Rushing as House Bill No. 1722, "An Act Relative to Gender-Based Discrimination and Hate Crimes". The bill was passed in 2011.

The final draft of "An Act Relative to Gender-Based Discrimination and Hate Crimes" didn't include any public accommodations (places that aren't home, school or work). In 2012 their next legislative fight began, working to ensure those spaces were included in anti-discrimination laws. An act including anti-discrimination regulations was passed in 2016. That act was then contested by anti-trans lobbyists. It was then put on the ballot for the 2018 election. In the election, Massachusetts voters decided to keep these transgender protections on the books.

In 2015 they launched the Identity Documentation Assistance Network. The network was designed to help Massachusetts residents change their legal name and gender markers.

MTPC hosts a local transgender resource wiki and helpful materials for transgender activism on its website.

MTPC currently has a Boston chapter and a North Shore chapter (NSTA). Mason J. Dunn is the former executive director of the organization, and Maxwell Ng chairs an eight-person steering committee. Current MTPC committees include a policy committee, a community engagement committee, a training, and education committee, a fundraising, and events committee, and the Interfaith Committee for Trans Equality.

== See also ==
- LGBT rights in Massachusetts
- Same-sex marriage in Massachusetts
- List of LGBT rights organizations
