= In Newsweekly =

American LGBT newspaper

- Type: LGBT weekly newspaper
- Format: eventually Tabloid
- Publisher: Christopher Robinson
- Founded: 1991
- Language: English
- Headquarters: Boston, Massachusetts
- Price: free

In Newsweekly, known as IN Newsweekly or in newsweekly during some of its publication, was an LGBT newspaper based in Boston, Massachusetts. It began in 1991 as IN Boston and became IN Newsweekly in 1993 when it merged with other publications and increased its coverage to include other New England states. In 2007, publisher and co-founder Chris Robinson sold the paper to HX Media, a New York–based company that published both the New York Blade and HX Magazine. After changing its title to New England Blade, the paper ceased publication in November 2008.
