= Transgender Day of Remembrance =

Day to memorialize transphobia victims

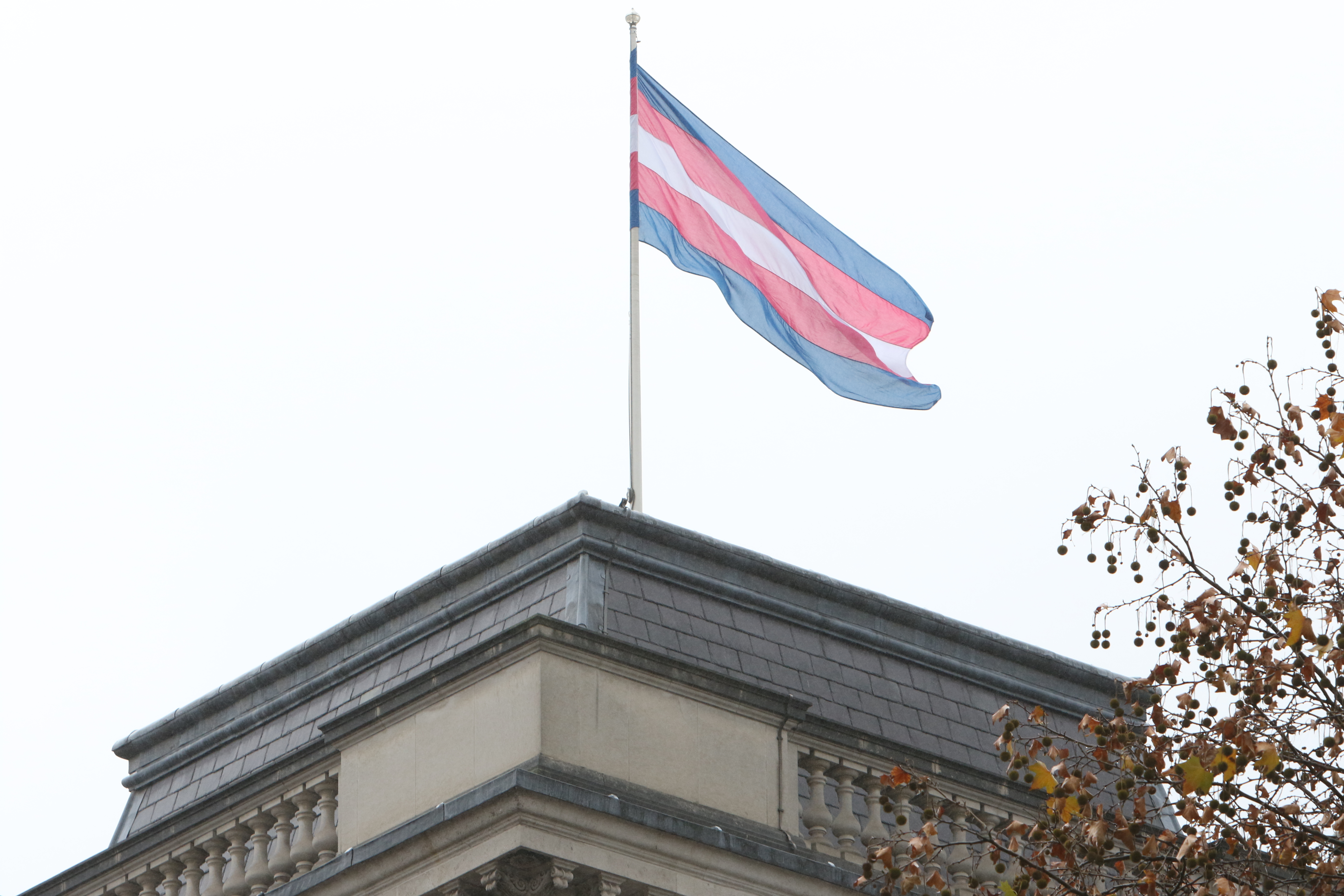
- A Transgender Pride flag on the British Foreign Office, 2018
- Observed by: Transgender community and supporters
- Type: International; Cultural
- Observances: Typically, a reading of the names of those who died within the past year, and may include other actions, such as candlelight vigils, dedicated church services, marches, art shows, food drives and film screenings
- Date: November 20
- Frequency: Annual
- First time: 1999; 27 years ago
- Related to: Transgender Awareness Week, International Transgender Day of Visibility

The Transgender Day of Remembrance (TDoR), also known as the International Transgender Day of Remembrance, has been observed annually from its inception on November 20, 1999, to memorialize those who have been murdered as a result of transphobia. The day was founded to draw attention to the continued violence directed toward transgender people. According to the Trans Murder Monitoring by Transgender Europe, 273 trans people were murdered worldwide from October 1, 2025 to September 30, 2026, with 95% of the victims being trans women. On average, one murder was reported every 32 hours.

Transgender Day of Remembrance was founded in 1999 by a small group, including Gwendolyn Ann Smith, Nancy Nangeroni, and Jahaira DeAlto, to memorialize the murders of Black transgender women Rita Hester in Allston, Massachusetts, and Chanelle Pickett in Watertown, Massachusetts. After Hester's death in 1998, Smith was surprised to realize that none of her friends remembered Pickett or her murder three years prior, saying "It really surprised me that it had already, in a short period of time, been forgotten, and here we were with another murder at the same site.” The first TDoR took place in November 1999 in Boston and San Francisco, as both Hester and Pickett's deaths occurred in November. TDoR continued to be observed annually on November 20, the anniversary of Pickett's murder. In 2010, TDoR was observed in over 185 cities throughout more than 20 countries.

Typically, a TDoR memorial includes a reading of the names of those who were killed within the past year, and may include other actions, such as candlelight vigils, dedicated church services, marches, art shows, food drives, and film screenings. GLAAD (formerly the Gay & Lesbian Alliance Against Defamation) has extensively covered TDoR, interviewed numerous transgender advocates (including actress Candis Cayne), profiled an event at the Lesbian, Gay, Bisexual & Transgender Community Center in New York, and discussed media coverage of TDoR.

== History ==
Rita Hester (November 30, 1963 – November 28, 1998) was a transgender African-American woman who was murdered in Allston, Massachusetts, on November 28, 1998. In response to her murder, an outpouring of grief and anger led to a candlelight vigil held the following Friday (December 4) in which about 250 people participated. The community struggle to see Rita's life and identity covered respectfully by local papers, including the Boston Herald and Bay Windows, was chronicled by Nancy Nangeroni. Her death inspired the "Remembering Our Dead" web project and the Transgender Day of Remembrance (TDoR).

Chanelle Pickett (August 6, 1972 – November 20, 1995) was a Black trans woman who was murdered in Watertown, Massachusetts, on November 20, 1995. Her death inspired many actions, including several vigils and the creation of a group dedicated to preventing violence against trans people, called "Remember Chanelle" which was formed on December 18, 1995. Similar to Rita Hester's murder, Chanelle Pickett's murder was chronicled by Nancy Nangeroni and also inspired the "Remembering Our Dead" web project and Transgender Day of Remembrance (TDoR).

Monique Thomas (March 30, 1963 – September 11, 1998) was a Black trans woman murdered at her home in Dorchester, Massachusetts. Her murder was discussed alongside the murders of Rita Hester and Chanelle Pickett in "Remembering Our Dead", a web project that led to the creation of International Transgender Day of Remembrance. Although Monique's death was not mentioned often during the initial creation of the day, she is now frequently mentioned in articles that discuss the ongoing impact and observance of Transgender Day of Remembrance.

== Reception ==
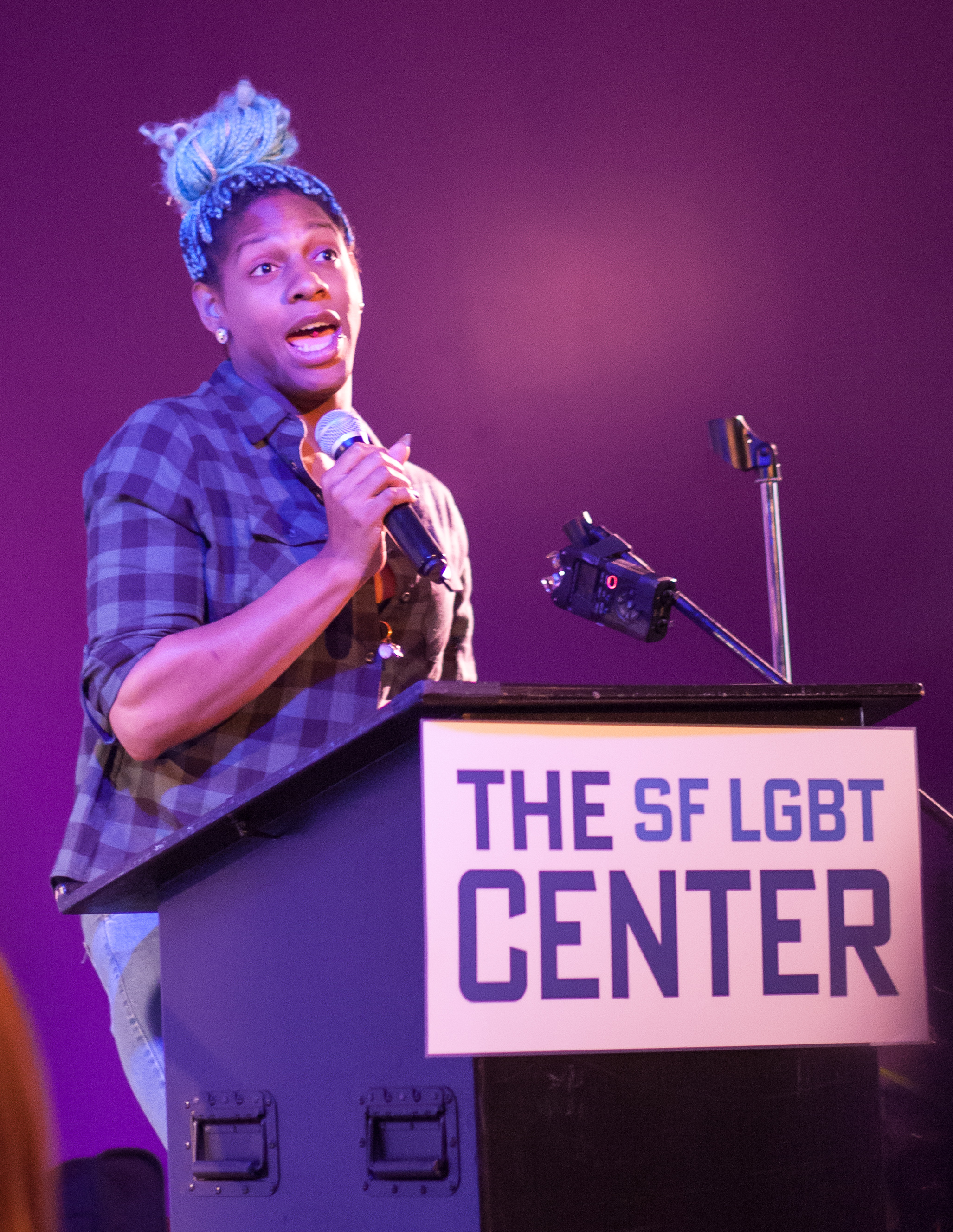
CeCe McDonald speaks at the 2015 Transgender Day of Remembrance in San Francisco.

Scholars and activists committed to advancing intersectional approaches to trans advocacy continue to highlight the importance of seeing transphobic violence as inherently connected to race, gender, and class. This is reflected in the disproportionate instances of violence against trans women of color, particularly Black and Latina transgender women.

The transgender pride flag being raised above the California State Capitol on the Transgender Day of Remembrance in 2019

Theorists C. Riley Snorton and Jin Haritaworn critique how images and narratives centering on the deaths of trans people of color—most often transfeminine bodies of color—are circulated within social movements and spaces headed by white gay and trans activists, such as TDoR. Scholar Sarah Lamble argues that TDoR's focus on a collective mourning risks producing the white spectator as innocent of, rather than complicit in, the violence that produces the deaths of trans women of color they are mourning. Lamble states that:

Our task then is to push these further—not only with respect to TDOR but also in the many ways we recount and confront violence. None of us are innocent. We must envision practices of remembrance that situate our own positions within structures of power that authorize violence in the first place. Our task is to move from sympathy to responsibility, from complicity to reflexivity, from witnessing to action. It is not enough to simply honor the memory of the dead—we must transform the practices of the living.

— Lamble, 2008: "Retelling Racialized Violence, Remaking White Innocence: The Politics of Interlocking Oppressions in Transgender Day of Remembrance"

Transgender activist Mirha-Soleil Ross criticizes TDoR for conflating the motivation behind the murders of transgender women sex workers. In an interview with scholar Viviane Namaste, she presents examples of transgender sex workers who were murdered in Toronto for being sex workers and accuses the organizers of TDoR of using these women who died for being sex workers as martyrs of the transgender community.

== Recognition by governments ==
=== Canada ===
The Canadian province of Ontario unanimously passed the Trans Day of Remembrance Act, 2017 on December 12, 2017, officially recognizing TDoR and requiring the Legislative Assembly of Ontario to hold a minute of silence every year on November 20.

=== United Kingdom ===
Transgender Day of Remembrance was recognized in the UK parliament through a motion tabled on 15 November 2021, with 14 members signing it. It's commemorated annually on 20 November to honor transgender people who have lost their lives to violence. On 13 November 2025, Caroline Russel (AM) moved a motion and Andrew Boff (AM) also moving a motion in recognition of the day. The tributes honored victims of anti-transgender violence, including Brianna Ghey, Naomi Hersi, among others.

=== United States ===
In 2020, US president-elect Joe Biden recognized the Transgender Day of Remembrance and said the transphobic violence experienced by trans women is intolerable. In 2021, Biden and Vice President Kamala Harris issued a statement saying, "At least 46 transgender Americans were killed by acts of fatal violence to date this year". His office also issued a report outlining "How the Biden-Harris Administration Is Advancing Safety, Opportunity, and Inclusion for Transgender and Gender Diverse Individuals." Moreover, Biden called on the Senate to pass the Equality Act.

Antony J. Blinken, United States Secretary of State, also issued a statement mourning the loss of trans lives in 2021. As the chief American diplomat, he stated, "Promoting and protecting the human rights of LGBTQI+ persons is a foreign policy priority of this Administration."

On November 18, 2021, on the House floor, Representative Ayanna Pressley read the names of 46 trans people murdered that year. Pressley was joined by other members of the Congressional Equality Caucus that included Representatives Marie Newman, David N. Cicilline, Mark Takano, Sara Jacobs, and Al Green.

== See also ==
- Category:Victims of anti-LGBTQ hate crimes
- Day of Silence
- International Transgender Day of Visibility
- List of LGBTQ awareness periods
- List of people killed for being transgender
- Trans Day of Action
- Transgender genocide
- Transgender history
- Transgender rights movement
