= Rita Hester =

Trans woman (1963–1998); murder inspired Transgender Day of Remembrance

- Born: November 30, 1963; Hartford, Connecticut, U.S.
- Died: November 28, 1998 (aged 34); Boston, Massachusetts, U.S.
- Known for: Murder inspired Transgender Day of Remembrance

Rita Hester (30 November 1963 – 28 November 1998) was an African-American transgender woman who was murdered in Allston (Boston), Massachusetts, on November 28, 1998.

Hester was born in Hartford, Connecticut, in 1964. She moved to Boston in her early twenties and became involved in the local rock community.

Hester was murdered while at home on November 28th, 1998, being stabbed twenty times by an unknown assailant. In response to her murder, an outpouring of grief and anger led to a candlelight vigil held the following Friday, December 4, in which about 250 people participated. The vigil was led by Rev. Irene Monroe. The community's struggle to see Rita's life and identity covered respectfully by local papers, including the Boston Herald and Bay Windows, was chronicled by Nancy Nangeroni. Her death also inspired the "Remembering Our Dead" web project and the Transgender Day of Remembrance, founded by Gwendolyn Ann Smith in 1999.

The city of Boston commissioned artist Rixy to paint a mural memorializing Hester in Allston. The mural was completed in July 2022.

The Hub of the Gay Universe: An LGBTQ History of Boston, Provincetown, and Beyond includes several quotes from people who knew her: “Rita Hester was statuesque and glamorous. Usually clad in her favorite colors, black and purple, perhaps in a slinky tube dress adorned with ruffles, she was a familiar figure both at Allston bars such as the Model Cafe and the Silhoutte Lounge and at Jacque’s Cabaret.” Another friend fondly remembered that Hester “liked to wear opera-length gloves with rings on top, big pieces of costume jewelry”. p.283
