= The Best of The Rippingtons =

Compilation album by The Rippingtons
- Released: November 11, 1997
- Recorded: 1986–1995
- Genres: Smooth jazz Jazz fusion
- Length: 52:10
- Label: GRP
- Producer: Russ Freeman

The Rippingtons chronology
Black Diamond (1997)	The Best of The Rippingtons (1997)	Topaz (1999)

The Best of The Rippingtons is a compilation album by the American jazz group The Rippingtons, released in 1997 by the GRP label. The album is a retrospective of their previous GRP albums, and also includes two previously unreleased tracks.

The album reached No. 10 on the Billboard Contemporary Jazz chart.

== Track listing ==
All songs written by Russ Freeman

1. "Garden of Babylon" - 5:40 (previously unreleased)
2. "Tourist in Paradise" - 5:41 (from Tourist in Paradise)
3. "Affair in San Miguel" - 5:08 (from Welcome to the St. James' Club)
4. "Snowbound" - 4:53 (from Curves Ahead)
5. "Aruba!" - 4:17 (from Tourist in Paradise)
6. "Sapphire Island" - 4:48 (previously unreleased)
7. "Principles of Desire" - 4:42 (from Sahara)
8. "Vienna" - 4:51 (from Weekend in Monaco)
9. "Kenya" - 5:22 (from Welcome to the St. James' Club)
10. "She Likes to Watch" - 5:31 (from Moonlighting)
11. "Urban Wanderer" - 4:43 (from Brave New World)
12. "Kilimanjaro" - 4:48 (from Kilimanjaro)

== Personnel ==
- Russ Freeman - guitar, synthesizers, keyboards
- Jeff Kashiwa - saxophone
- Steve Reid - percussion
- Brandon Fields - saxophone
- Kenny G - saxophone
- Gregg Karukas - keyboards
- Kim Stone - bass
- Steve Bailey - bass
- Tony Morales - drums
- Patti Austin - vocals
- Carl Anderson - vocals
- Bill Lanphier - bass
- Eric Marienthal - saxophone
- Kirk Whalum - saxophone
- Mark Portmann - piano

== Charts ==
Chart (1997)	Peak position
US Billboard Jazz Albums	10
