= 20th Anniversary =

Studio album by The Rippingtons
- Released: July 25, 2006
- Genre: Smooth jazz
- Length: 48:09
- Label: Peak
- Producer: Russ Freeman, Andi Howard, Brian McKnight, Steve Sykes, and Mark Wexler

The Rippingtons chronology
Wild Card (2005)	20th Anniversary (2006)	Modern Art (2009)

Professional ratings
Review scores
Source	Rating
AllMusic	3.5/5 stars

20th Anniversary is The Rippingtons' fourteenth album, which was released in 2006. As the title states, this album commemorates the band's 20 years performing together.

== Track listing ==
No.	Title	Length
1.	"City of Angels"	5:05
2.	"Celebrate"	4:43
3.	"Costa del Sol"	4:19
4.	"Bingo Jingo"	4:42
5.	"Eternity"	4:26
6.	"Six Four"	4:02
7.	"Rainbow"	4:29
8.	"Twenty"	3:56
9.	"Anything"	4:26
10.	"A Kiss Under the Moonlight"	4:08
11.	"A 20th Anniversary Bonus / I'll Be Around"	5:53

Packaged with the album is a DVD which contains a 25-minute retrospective, as well as four music videos:

1. "Tourist in Paradise" (from Tourist in Paradise)
2. "Curves Ahead" (from Curves Ahead)
3. "High Roller" (from Live in L.A.)
4. "I'll Be Around" (from Sahara)
