= Russ Freeman (guitarist) =

American smooth jazz guitarist

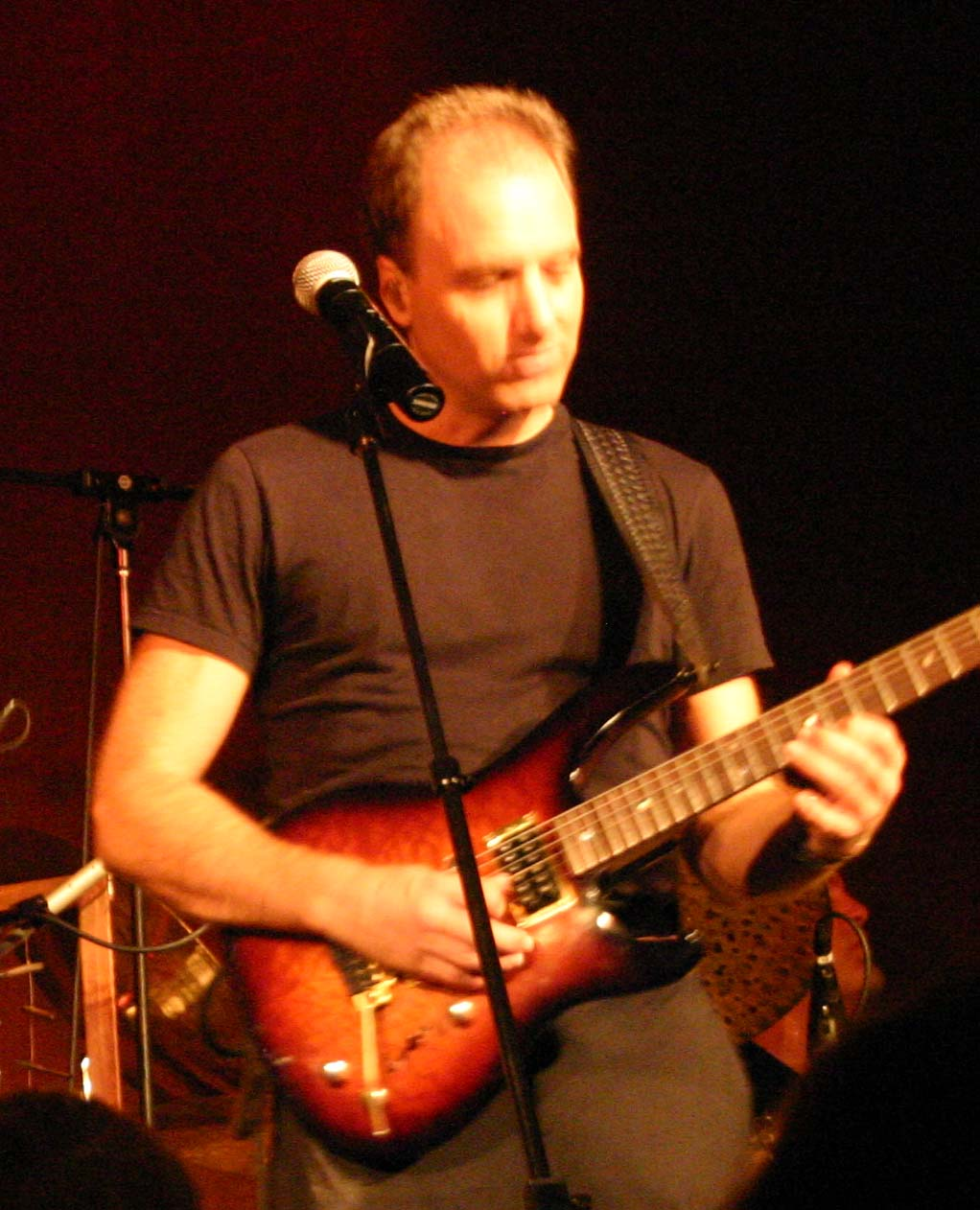

Background information
- Born: February 11, 1960 (age 66); Nashville, Tennessee, U.S.
- Genres: Smooth jazz, jazz fusion
- Occupations: Musician, composer, record producer, record label owner
- Instruments: Guitar, Keyboards, Bass, Drums
- Years active: 1985–2020
- Label: Peak
- Website: www.rippingtons.com

Russ Freeman (born February 11, 1960) is a retired smooth jazz guitarist who was the founder and leader of The Rippingtons.

== Life and career ==
Born in Nashville, Tennessee, Freeman started on guitar when he was ten years old. His first teacher was a session musician in Nashville who knew his father. He followed his teacher around Nashville studios and after six years worked in a variety of sessions as a professional guitarist. Two years later, he moved to Los Angeles, where he found work playing for commercials and with vocalists Engelbert Humperdinck and Anne Murray. He cites George Benson and Larry Carlton as influences.

For one year he attended the California Institute of the Arts. He recorded his first solo album, Nocturnal Playground. In 1985, he founded the band The Rippingtons as an opportunity to record with a variety of musicians. The first version of the band included David Benoit, Gregg Karukas, Brandon Fields, Kenny G, and Dave Koz. By 1993, The Rippingtons had solidified into a sextet of Freeman, Jeff Kashiwa on saxophone, Dave Kochanski on keyboards, Kim Stone on bass guitar, Tony Morales on drums, and Steve Reid on percussion. In 1994 Freeman reunited with Benoit for The Benoit/Freeman Project. Freeman and his manager, Andi Howard, formed Peak Records in 1994. In 1998 he collaborated with guitarist Craig Chaquico of Starship for the album From the Redwoods to the Rockies.

A record producer and arranger, Freeman also plays bass guitar, keyboards, and drums. His music can be heard during The Weather Channel's Local on the 8s segments, and his song "Brave New World" is included in the 2008 compilation album, The Weather Channel Presents: Smooth Jazz II.

His wife, Yaredt Leon, has composed music for The Rippingtons' albums.

== Awards ==
- University School of Nashville, Tennessee, Distinguished Alumni Award, 1995

== Discography ==
=== As leader ===
- Nocturnal Playground (Brainchild, Alfa Records (Japan), 1986)
- Holiday (GRP, 1995)
- Drive (Peak, 2002)

With The Rippingtons

- Moonlighting (Passport, Alfa Moon (Japan; under its title Cruise Control — Moon Riding, 1986)
- Kilimanjaro (Passport, 1988)
- Tourist in Paradise (GRP, 1989)
- Welcome to the St. James' Club (GRP, 1990)
- Curves Ahead (GRP, 1991)
- Weekend in Monaco (GRP, 1992)
- Live in L.A. (GRP, 1993)
- Sahara (GRP, 1994)
- Brave New World (Peak, 1996)
- Black Diamond (Windham Hill, 1997)
- Topaz(Windham Hill, 1999)
- Life in the Tropics (Peak, 2000)
- Live Across America (Peak, 2002)
- Let It Ripp (Peak, 2003)
- Wild Card (Peak, 2005)
- Modern Art (Peak, 2009)
- Côte d'Azur (Peak, 2011)
- Built to Last (Peak, 2012)
- Fountain of Youth (eOne, 2014)
- True Stories (Peak, 2016)
- Open Road (eOne, 2019)

With David Benoit

- The Benoit/Freeman Project (GRP, 1994)
- The Benoit/Freeman Project 2 (Peak, 2004)

=== As sideman ===
With David Benoit

- Freedom at Midnight (GRP, 1987)
- Every Step of the Way (GRP, 1988)

With others

- Carl Anderson, Pieces of a Heart (GRP, 1990)
- Carl Anderson, Fantasy Hotel (GRP, 1992)
- Steve Bailey, Dichotomy (Justice, 1994)
- Brian Bromberg, Basses Loaded (Intima, 1988)
- Doug Cameron, Passion Suite (Spindletop, 1987)
- Lorraine Feather, The Body Remembers (Bean Bag, 1996)
- Brandon Fields, Other Places (Nova, 1990)
- Gregg Karukas, GK (Trippin 'n' Rhythm, 2009)
- Jeff Kashiwa, Peace of Mind (Native Language, 2004)
- Michael Lington, A Foreign Affair Christmas (Copenhagen Music, 2019)
- Barry Manilow, Barry Manilow (Arista, 1989)
- Eric Marienthal, Turn Up the Heat (Peak, 2001)
- Eric Marienthal, Got You Covered! (Peak, 2005)
- Jason Miles, To Grover with Love (ARTizen, 2006)
- Alphonse Mouzon, On Top of the World (Tenacious, 1994)
- Alphonse Mouzon, The Survivor (Tenacious, 1992)
- Phil Perry, Pure Pleasure (GRP, 1994)
- Phil Perry, Magic (Peak, 2001)
- Nelson Rangell, In Every Moment (GRP, 1992)
- Emily Remler, This Is Me (Justice, 1990)
- Paul Taylor, Undercover (N-Coded, 2000)
- Tim Weisberg, Outrageous Temptations (Cypress, 1989)
