= Holiday (Russ Freeman album) =

Studio album by Russ Freeman
- Released: 1995
- Recorded: 1995
- Studio: Cheyenne Mountain Ranch Studios (Colorado); Alpha Studios (Burbank, California); Remidi Studios (Ardley-On-Hudson, New York)
- Genre: Smooth jazz Jazz fusion Christmas music
- Length: 50:14
- Label: GRP Records
- Producer: Russ Freeman

Russ Freeman chronology
The Benoit/Freeman Project (1994)	Holiday (1995)	From The Redwoods To The Rockies (1998)

Holiday is a Christmas music by American guitarist Russ Freeman. The album reached #5 on Billboard's Contemporary Jazz chart.
Russ Freeman also serves as leader and frontman for the Rippingtons.

== Track listing ==
Tracks 1, 3-6 & 10 arranged by Russ Freeman.

1. Carol of the Bells - 1:45
2. Faith (Russ Freeman) - 4:33
3. O Come, All Ye Faithful - 1:05
4. Hark! The Herald Angels Sing - 2:58
5. God Rest Ye Merry Gentlemen - 4:15
6. Angels We Have Heard on High - 1:12
7. Hymne (Vangelis) - 2:34
8. Holiday (Freeman) - 4:17
9. My Favorite Things - 4:15
10. Jesu, Joy of Man's Desiring - 3:05
11. Merry Christmas, Baby - 4:39
12. This Christmas - 4:10
13. Have Yourself a Merry Little Christmas - 3:06

== Personnel ==
- Russ Freeman – all instruments (1, 4, 7, 13), keyboards (2, 5, 8, 10), electric guitar (2, 5, 8), bass (2, 5, 8, 11, 12), drums (2, 5, 8), classical guitar (3, 6, 10), acoustic guitar (5, 8), percussion (5, 8), 12-string acoustic guitar (8), hi-3rd guitar (8), mandolin (8), Epiphone guitar (9), all other instruments (9), additional keyboards (11, 12), rhythm programming (11, 12)
- Bob James – acoustic piano (5, 9), electric piano (5, 11), keyboards (12)
- Steve Bailey – acoustic bass (10)
- Steve Reid – percussion (10)
- Jeff Kashiwa – alto saxophone (2), tenor saxophone (11, 12)
- Judd Miller – EWI (10)
- Steven Holtman – trombone (5, 8, 11)
- Gary Grant – trumpet (5, 8, 11), flugelhorn (5)
- Jerry Hey – trumpet (5, 8, 11), flugelhorn (5)
- Bridgette Bryant – vocals (8, 11, 12)
- Lynne Fiddmont – vocals (8, 11, 12)
- Lillian Tynes Perry – vocals (8, 11, 12)

=== Production ===
- Russ Freeman – producer, recording, mixing; all song, vocal and horn arrangements
- Wes Cavalier – additional engineer
- Ken Freeman – additional engineer
- Alan Hirschberg – additional engineer
- Joseph Doughney – digital editing at The Review Room (New York, NY)
- Andi Howard – production coordinator
- Robin Lynch – art direction, graphic design
- Freddie Paloma – graphic design
- Lisa Peardon – photography
