= True Stories =

True Stories may refer to:

- True Stories (film), a 1986 film by Talking Heads frontman David Byrne
  - True Stories (Talking Heads album), a 1986 Talking Heads album featuring songs from the film
  - Sounds from True Stories, the soundtrack from the film
- Avicii: True Stories, a 2017 documentary directed by Levan Tsikurishvili about the DJ and record producer Avicii
- True Stories (Martin Simpson album), a 2009 album by Martin Simpson
- True Stories (The Rippingtons album), a 2016 album by The Rippingtons
- True Stories (collection), a 1981 collection of poetry by Canadian author Margaret Atwood
- True Stories (Documentary) (TV series), a British television documentary series which aired on Channel 4
- True Stories (TV series), an Australian television series which aired on the Seven Network, hosted by Anna Coren
- True Stories, a 2004 Nathan Rogers album
- True Stories, a 1978 David Sancious album
- True Stories, memoirs of Russian gulag inmate and writer Lev Razgon
- True Stories: Selected Non-Fiction, a 1996 book by Helen Garner

== See also ==
- True Story (disambiguation)
- Based on a True Story (disambiguation)
