= Black Diamond (The Rippingtons album) =

Studio album by The Rippingtons
- Released: March 24, 1997
- Recorded: October 1996
- Studios: Cheyenne Mountain Ranch Studios (Colorado); Sound On Sound (New York City, New York); Werewolf Studio (Oakland, California); Sonic Jungle Studios (North Hollywood, California)
- Genres: Jazz, Smooth jazz
- Length: 52:10
- Labels: Windham Hill, Peak Records
- Producer: Russ Freeman

The Rippingtons chronology
| Brave New World (1996) | Black Diamond (1997) | The Best of The Rippingtons (1997) |

Black Diamond is the ninth studio album by the American Jazz group the Rippingtons. Released in 1997, it was their first release on Windham Hill Records after the transfer of Peak Records from GRP Records earlier that year. The album reached number one on Billboard's contemporary jazz chart.

== Track listing ==
All tracks written by Russ Freeman except where noted.

1. "Black Diamond" – 4:46
2. "Deep Powder" – 6:16
3. "Seven Nights in Rome" – 5:05
4. "Soul Seeker" – 4:40
5. "In Another Life" – 5:41
6. "Big Sky" – 4:23
7. "If I Owned the World" (Russ Freeman, Mark Williamson) – 3:39
8. "North Peak" – 4:12
9. "Angelfire" – 4:13
10. "Jewel Thieves" – 5:05
11. "Black Diamond" (Acoustic Version) – 4:09

== Personnel ==
The Rippingtons

- Russ Freeman – keyboards (1–3, 5, 6, 8–10), guitars (1, 6, 10), 12-string guitar (1, 6, 11), rhythm loops (1, 2, 8), acoustic guitar (2, 7, 8, 11), jazz guitar (2, 4), bass (2, 5, 9, 10), classical guitars (3, 9), mandolin (3, 6), percussion (3, 7, 9), Epiphone guitar (5), drum programming (6), baritone guitar (7, 8), electric guitar (8), rhythm programming (10), slide guitar (11)
- David Kochanski – keyboards (1, 2, 4, 8, 10), organ (1, 6, 11), drum programming (4), rhythm loops (5), acoustic piano (6), rhythm programming (10)
- Kim Stone – bass (1, 3, 6, 11), fretless bass (3, 8), bass fills (10)
- Steve Reid – percussion (8, 11)
- Jeff Kashiwa – EWI controller (1), tenor sax solo (2), tenor saxophone (4), soprano saxophone (11)

Guest Musicians

- Mark Williamson – backing vocals (1, 2, 4, 6–8, 10, 11), lead vocals (7), acoustic guitar (7), percussion (7)
- Pete Escovedo – percussion (9)
- Nelson Rangell – alto saxophone (10), tenor saxophone (10), flute (10)
- Mark Ledford – trumpet (5)
- Arturo Sandoval – trumpet solo (9)

=== Production ===
- Andi Howard – executive producer, management
- Russ Freeman – executive producer, producer, arrangements, recording, mixing
- Carl Griffin – producer (trumpet sessions on Tracks 5 & 9), mixing
- Paul Wickliffe – additional recording
- Ray Obiedo – recording assistant
- John Reigart III – recording assistant
- Brian Springer – recording assistant
- Nick Sodano – mixing
- Doug Sax – mastering at The Mastering Lab (Hollywood, California)
- Patrick Clifford – A&R
- Larry Hamby – A&R
- Sonny Mediana – art direction
- Ilene Weingard – design
- Bill Mayer – illustration
- Carl Studna – photography

== Charts ==
| Chart (1997) | Peak position |
|---|---|
| US Billboard Jazz Albums | 1 |
