= Topaz (The Rippingtons album) =

Studio album by The Rippingtons
- Released: May 18, 1999
- Recorded: 1999
- Studio: Cheyenne Mountain Ranch Studios (Colorado)
- Genres: Jazz, smooth jazz
- Length: 48:55
- Label: Windham Hill / Peak
- Producer: Russ Freeman

The Rippingtons chronology
The Best of The Rippingtons (1997)	Topaz (1999)	Life in the Tropics (2000)

Topaz is the tenth studio album by the American jazz group the Rippingtons, released in 1999 through Windham Hill Records. The album reached No. 2 on Billboard's contemporary jazz chart.

== Track listing ==
All tracks are written by Russ Freeman.

CD
No.	Title	Length
1.	"Taos"	5:53
2.	"Summer Lovers"	4:40
3.	"Spirits in the Canyon"	5:01
4.	"Under a Spanish Moon"	4:18
5.	"Temple of the Sun"	4:45
6.	"Stories of the Painted Desert"	4:42
7.	"Snakedance"	4:21
8.	"Led Here By An Eagle"	5:20
9.	"Topaz: Gem of the Setting Sun"	4:57
10.	"Rain"	4:58
Total length:		48:55

== Personnel ==
The Rippingtons

- Russ Freeman – keyboards (1–3, 5–8), acoustic guitar (1, 6, 10), electric guitar (1, 4, 6, 8, 9), classical guitar (1, 4, 5, 7), bass (1, 2, 6, 8, 10), guitars (2, 3), 12-string guitar (6)
- David Kochanski – acoustic piano solo (3, 4)
- Kim Stone – bass (3, 7), arco bass (4)
- David Hooper – drums (1–3, 5–10), percussion (7, 9)
- Ray Yslas – percussion (does not play on album)

With special guest:

- Paul Taylor – alto saxophone (3), soprano saxophone (5, 10)

Additional musicians

- Bill Heller – keyboards (1–3, 5–10), organ solo (9), Kawai grand piano (10)
- Tom Gannaway – flamenco guitar intro (4)
- Tony Morales – drums (4)
- Steve Reid – percussion (4)
- Robert Tree Cody – pito (1, 6, 8)

=== Production ===
- Andi Howard – executive producer, management
- Russ Freeman – executive producer, producer, arrangements, recording, mixing
- Nick Sodano – recording, mixing
- Doug Sax – mastering at The Mastering Lab (Hollywood, California)
- Patrick Clifford – A&R
- Sonny Mediana – art direction, photography
- A to A Graphics – design
- Carl Studna – photo of Russ Freeman
- Bill Mayer – cover artwork

== Charts ==
Chart (1997)	Peak position
US Billboard Jazz Albums	4
