= Curves Ahead =

Studio album by the Rippingtons
- Released: August 13, 1991
- Recorded: 1991
- Studios: Alpha and Underwear (Burbank, California); The Slam Shack (North Hollywood, California)
- Genre: Jazz
- Length: 47:57
- Label: GRP
- Producer: Russ Freeman

The Rippingtons chronology
Welcome to the St. James' Club (1990)	Curves Ahead (1991)	Weekend in Monaco (1992)

Curves Ahead is the fifth studio album by the American jazz group the Rippingtons, released in 1991 through GRP Records. The album reached No. 1 on Billboard's Contemporary Jazz chart.

== Track listing ==
All tracks written by Russ Freeman.

1. "Curves Ahead" - 5:39
2. "Aspen" - 5:28
3. "Santa Fe Trail" - 5:14
4. "Take Me with You" - 5:34
5. "North Star" - 5:24
6. "Miles Away" - 5:17
7. "Snowbound" - 4:51
8. "Nature of the Beast" - 6:21
9. "Morning Song" - 4:09

== Personnel ==
The Rippingtons

- Russ Freeman – keyboards, acoustic guitar (1, 3, 6, 7), electric guitar (1, 2, 5–8), guitar synthesizer (1, 8), horn arrangements (1, 3), bass (3–7), classical guitar (4, 9), steel-string guitar (9)
- Mark Portmann – acoustic piano (2, 4, 9), keyboards (8)
- Kim Stone – bass (1, 2, 8)
- Tony Morales – drums (1–4, 6, 7, 9)
- Steve Reid – congas (1, 3–9), blocks (1, 4), udus (1), shakers (1, 2, 4, 6, 7, 9), Chinese bells (1), Japanese bells (1), jingle stick (1), caxixi (1, 8), toys (1, 3, 6, 8, 9), percussion (2, 5), tambourine (2, 6), apito (3), cowbell (3), ganzá (3, 8), surdo (3, 8), timbales (3), vocals (3), chimes (4, 9), guiro (4), crotales (4, 9), spinning bells (4), bongos (7, 8), claves (7), pods (7), batá drum (8), djembe (8), djum-djum (8), axatse (8), repinique (8), shekere (8), seed pods (8), rainstick (8), bird calls (8)
- Jeff Kashiwa – alto saxophone (1, 7), tenor saxophone (1), soprano saxophone (2)

Additional musicians

- Dave Grusin – acoustic piano and solo (5)
- Steve Bailey – additional fretted and fretless basses (7), fretless bass (9)
- Omar Hakim – drums (5, 8)
- Nelson Rangell – alto saxophone (1, 3, 8), flute (3, 9), piccolo solo (9), whistling (9)
- Bobby Martin – tenor saxophone (1, 6)
- Kirk Whalum – tenor saxophone (5, 6)
- Bruce Fowler – trombone (1, 3)
- Steve Szabo – trumpet (1, 3)

Production

- Dave Grusin – executive producer
- Larry Rosen – executive producer
- Carl Griffin – associate executive producer
- Russ Freeman – producer, arrangements, engineer, digital mixing
- Brant Biles – engineer, digital mixing
- Robert Margouleff – engineer, digital mixing
- David Hesse – additional engineer
- Joseph Doughney – post-production
- Michael Landay – post-production
- The Review Room (New York City, New York) – post-production location
- Bernie Grundman – mastering at Bernie Grundman Mastering (Hollywood, California)
- Andi Howard – production coordinator, management
- Michele Lewis – production coordinator
- Andy Baltimore – creative director
- David Gibb – graphic design
- Scott Johnson – graphic design
- Sonny Mediana – graphic design
- Andy Ruggirello – graphic design
- Dan Serrano – graphic design
- Bill Mayer – front cover artwork
- Jeff Katz – photography

== Charts ==
Chart (1991)	Peak position
Billboard Jazz Albums	1
