= Welcome to the St. James' Club =

Studio album by the Rippingtons
- Released: 1990
- Recorded: March–May 1990
- Studios: The Slam Shack and Pacifique (North Hollywood, California); Aire L.A. (Glendale, California)
- Genres: Jazz, jazz fusion
- Length: 47:13
- Label: GRP
- Producer: Russ Freeman

The Rippingtons chronology
Tourist in Paradise (1989)	Welcome to the St. James' Club (1990)	Curves Ahead (1991)

Welcome to the St. James' Club is the fourth studio album by the American jazz group the Rippingtons, released in 1990. It reached No. 1 on Billboard's Jazz chart. The group supported the album with a North American tour. The album was produced by Russ Freeman, who chose to give the songs a more rhythmic direction.

== Critical reception ==
Professional ratings
Review scores
Source	Rating
AllMusic	2.5/5 stars
Chicago Tribune	3/4 stars

The Philadelphia Inquirer deemed the album "generally complex, heavily synthesized music—some of it heavily orchestrated." The Chicago Tribune concluded that "what pop is to rock, the Rippingtons is to jazz—upbeat, modern and able to sell a lot of albums."

== Track listing ==
(All tracks composed by Russ Freeman).

1. "Welcome to the St. James' Club" - 4:41
2. "Wednesday's Child" - 4:53
3. "I Watched Her Walk Away" - 5:24
4. "Kenya" - 5:23
5. "Affair in San Miguel" - 5:04
6. "Tropic of Capricorn" - 4:59
7. "Who's Holding Her Now?" - 3:53
8. "Soul Mates" - 4:57
9. "Passion Fruit" - 4:34
10. "Victoria's Secret" - 3:25

== Personnel ==
The Rippingtons

- Russ Freeman – keyboards, keyboard programming, acoustic guitar (1, 5–7), electric guitar (1–6, 8–10), guitar synthesizer (1–4, 6, 8, 10), bass, drums (1–5, 8, 10), classical guitar (3), percussion (4, 8)
- Steve Bailey – additional fretless bass (2, 4, 5, 9, 10)
- Tony Morales – cymbals (1–5, 8), hi-hat (1–5, 8), additional cymbals (7)
- Steve Reid – percussion, vocals (6)
- Jeff Kashiwa – saxophone (1, 6), EWI controller (1)

Guest musicians and vocalists

- Mike Lang – acoustic piano (6)
- Joe Sample – acoustic piano (9)
- Vinnie Colaiuta – drums (6, 7, 9)
- Brant Biles – additional shaker (1)
- Kirk Whalum – saxophone (2, 8)
- Judd Miller – EWI controller (2, 4, 10)
- Brandon Fields – saxophone (3, 5, 7, 9), soprano saxophone (10)
- Carl Anderson – vocals (1, 4)
- Lynne Fiddmont – vocals (1)
- Patti Austin – vocals (3, 8)
- Dee Dee Bellson – vocals (4)
- Kevin Guillaume – vocals (4)

Production

- Dave Grusin – executive producer
- Larry Rosen – executive producer
- Russ Freeman – producer, arrangements, engineer, mixing
- Robert Margouleff – mixing, additional engineer
- Carl Griffin – additional mixing (2, 4, 8)
- Anthony Jeffries – additional engineer
- David Nesse – additional engineer
- Steve Reid – additional engineer
- Mike Scotella – additional engineer
- Brant Biles – associate mix engineer
- Bernie Grundman – editing and mastering at Bernie Grundman Mastering (Hollywood, California)
- Bruce Volk – technical support
- Suzanne Sherman – production coordinator
- Bill Mayer – front cover artwork
- Andy Baltimore – creative director
- David Gibb – graphic design
- Jacki McCarthy – graphic design
- Andy Ruggirello – graphic design
- Dan Serrano – graphic design
- Jeff Sedlik – photography
- Andi Howard – stylist, wardrobe, management
- Bruce Grayson – make-up
- Lucia Casteneda – hair

== Charts ==
Chart (1990)	Peak position
Billboard Jazz Albums	1
