= Weekend in Monaco =

Studio album by the Rippingtons
- Released: August 18, 1992
- Recorded: 1992
- Studio: Cheyenne Mountain Ranch (Colorado)
- Genres: Smooth jazz, jazz
- Length: 48:41
- Label: GRP
- Producer: Russ Freeman

The Rippingtons chronology
Curves Ahead (1991)	Weekend in Monaco (1992)	Live in L.A. (1992)

Weekend in Monaco is the sixth studio album by the American jazz group the Rippingtons, released in 1992. The album reached No. 2 on Billboard's Contemporary Jazz chart. It has sold more than 300,000 copies.

== Critical reception ==
The Washington Post wrote: "Guitarist Russ Freeman, who now gets top billing in the band, deserves some credit for trying to reflect the band's world travels in its music, but the results are often so tame and homogenized that one has to ask the question, why bother?" The Globe and Mail stated that "Freeman's formula for assertively tuneful fusion—modestly dramatic, light on raunch—works well enough again on Weekend in Monaco to sustain Rippingtons' high ranking among the idiom's second-generation, West-Coast bands."

== Track listing ==
All tracks composed by Russ Freeman

1. "Weekend in Monaco" - 5:19
2. "St. Tropez" - 5:55
3. "Vienna" - 4:49
4. "Indian Summer" - 5:44
5. "A Place for Lovers" - 5:12
6. "Carnival" - 5:45
7. "Moka Java" - 5:46
8. "Highroller" - 5:56
9. "Where the Road Will Lead Us" - 4:15

== Personnel ==
The Rippingtons

- Russ Freeman – keyboards, guitars (1), acoustic guitars (2–4, 7), electric guitars (2–6, 8, 9), classical guitar (3, 5, 9), bass (8)
- Mark Portmann – acoustic piano solos (1–3, 7)
- Kim Stone – bass (1, 2, 7), fretted bass (4), bass solo (8)
- Steve Bailey – fretless bass (3–5, 9), bass (6)
- Tony Morales – drums
- Steve Reid – percussion (1–5, 7–9), congas (1–5, 7–9), toys (1–5, 7–9), Brazilian percussion (6), soundscapes (6), vocals (6), timbales (7)
- Jeff Kashiwa – alto saxophone (1, 4, 8), tenor saxophone (2), EWI controller (4, 6), soprano saxophone (5, 9), alto sax solo (7), soundscapes (9)

Production

- Dave Grusin – executive producer
- Larry Rosen – executive producer
- Carl Griffin – assistant executive producer
- Russ Freeman – producer, recording, mixing
- Suzy Freeman – additional engineer (1)
- Brian Springer – additional engineer (1)
- Steve Reid – soundscape recording (6) at The Slam Shack (North Hollywood, California)
- Brant Biles – mixing (2–9)
- Robert Margouleff – mixing (2–9)
- Joseph Doughney – post-production
- Michael Landy – post-production
- Adam Zelinka – post-production
- The Review Room (New York City, New York) – post-production location
- Bernie Grundman – mastering at Bernie Grundman Mastering (Hollywood, California)
- Andi Howard – production coordinator, management
- Michael Pollard – production coordinator
- Doreen Kalcich – production assistant
- Andy Baltimore – creative director
- David Gibb – graphic design
- Scott Johnson – graphic design
- Sonny Mediana – graphic design
- Andy Ruggirello – graphic design
- Dan Serrano – graphic design
- Emil Bogan – graphic design assistant
- Bill Mayer – front cover artwork

== Charts ==
Chart (1992)	Peak position
US Billboard Jazz Albums	2
