= Modern Art (The Rippingtons album) =

Studio album by The Rippingtons
- Released: March 10, 2009
- Studios: Surfboard Studios (Boca Raton, Florida)
- Genre: Smooth jazz
- Length: 45:55
- Label: Peak
- Producers: Russ Freeman and Andi Howard

The Rippingtons chronology
20th Anniversary (2006)	Modern Art (2009)	Côte_D'Azur (2011)

Professional ratings
Review scores
Source	Rating
Allmusic	2.5/5 stars

Modern Art is the fourteenth studio album by the American jazz group the Rippingtons, released in 2009 through Peak Records. The album is the first Rippingtons album to not feature a hand percussion player. Guitarist/bandleader Russ Freeman cited a desire to explore the possibilities of a smaller ensemble.

== Track listing ==
All songs composed by Russ Freeman, except where noted.

1. "Modern Art" - 4:17
2. "Paris Groove" - 3:39
3. "Black Book" - 3:59
4. "Pastels on Canvas" (Freeman, Yaredt Leon) - 4:54
5. "One Step Closer" - 4:41
6. "I Still Believe" (Freeman, Leon) - 4:38
7. "Body Art" - 4:40
8. "Age of Reason" - 4:28
9. "Sweet Lullaby" (Freeman, Leon) - 4:22
10. "Jet Set" - 4:14
11. "Love Story" - 4:03
12. "Twist of Fate" - 3:27 (iTunes only)

== Personnel ==
The Rippingtons

- Russ Freeman – keyboards, guitars, electric sitar, bass and rhythm programming
- Bill Heller – keyboards, accordion
- Rico Belled – bass
- Dave Karasony – drums
- Jeff Kashiwa – saxophones, EWI

With:

- Rick Braun – trumpet (11)

=== Production ===
- Andi Howard – executive producer, management
- Russ Freeman – executive producer, producer, arrangements, recording, mixing (2–5, 9)
- Steve Sykes – mixing (1, 6–8, 10, 11)
- Alfredo Matheus – mixing (3–5)
- Bernie Grundman – mastering at Bernie Grundman Mastering (Hollywood, California)
- Valerie Ince – product manager
- Sonny Mediana – art direction, design, photography
- MAD Design – art direction, design, photography
- Bill Mayer – illustration
