= Live in L.A. (The Rippingtons album) =

Live album by The Rippingtons
- Released: 1992
- Recorded: September 25–26, 1992
- Genres: Smooth jazz Jazz
- Length: 54:44
- Label: GRP
- Producer: Russ Freeman

The Rippingtons chronology
Weekend in Monaco (1992)	Live in L.A. (1992)	Sahara (1994)

Live in L.A. is the first live album by the American jazz group The Rippingtons, released in 1992 through GRP Records. It is the group's first live album. The album reached No. 6 on Billboard's contemporary jazz chart.

Live in L.A. was recorded on consecutive nights at the Majestic Ventura Theatre and at the Greek Theatre on September 25–26, 1992.

== Track listing ==
All tracks composed by Russ Freeman.

1. "Indian Summer" - 5:19
2. "Aspen" - 5:55
3. "Curves Ahead" - 4:49
4. "Weekend in Monaco" - 5:44
5. "One Summer Night in Brazil" - 5:12
6. "Highroller" - 6:59
7. "Introduction of the Band" - 1:33
8. "Morocco" - 5:03
9. "Dream of the Sirens" - 5:22
10. "Tourist in Paradise" - 6:50

== Personnel ==
The Rippingtons

- Russ Freeman – acoustic guitar, classical guitar, electric guitar, guitar synthesizer
- Mark Portmann – keyboards
- Kim Stone – bass
- Tony Morales – drums
- Steve Reid – percussion
- Jeff Kashiwa – saxophones, EWI controller, horn arrangements (1, 2, 6)

Guest Musicians

- David Benoit – acoustic piano (4, 10)
- Paul Carman – alto saxophone
- Wendell Kelly – trombone
- Matt Fronke – trumpet
- Carl Anderson – vocals (10)

=== Production ===
- Dave Grusin – executive producer
- Larry Rosen – executive producer
- Carl Griffin – associate executive producer, mixing
- Russ Freeman – producer, arrangements, mixing
- Don Murray – recording
- Joseph Doughney – post-production editing
- Michael Landy – digital editing, post-production editing
- Adam Zelinka – post-production editing
- Ted Jensen – mastering
- Sharon Franklin – production assistant
- Diane Dragonette – production coordinator
- Michael Pollard – production coordinator
- Sonny Mediana – production director
- Andy Baltimore – creative director
- Scott Johnson – art direction
- Dan Serrano – art direction
- Alba Acevedo – graphic design
- Jackie Salway – graphic design
- Bill Mayer – front cover illustration
- Masato – photography
- Lucia Castaneda – hair, make-up
- Andi Howard – manager

Studios

- Mixed at Cheyenne Mountain Ranch Studios (Colorado).
- Edited at The Review Room (New York City, New York).
- Mastered at Sterling Sound (New York City, New York).

== Charts ==
Chart (1992)	Peak position
Billboard Jazz Albums	6
