= Built to Last (The Rippingtons album) =

Studio album by The Rippingtons
- Released: August 28, 2012
- Studio: Surfboard Studios (Marina del Rey, California)
- Genre: Smooth jazz
- Length: 1:02:16
- Label: eOne
- Producer: Russ Freeman

The Rippingtons chronology
| Cote D'Azur (2011) | Built to Last (2012) | Fountain of Youth (2014) |

Built to Last is a 2012 album by The Rippingtons.

== Track listing ==
All songs written by Russ Freeman, except Track 11 written by Russ Freeman and Yaredt Leon.

1. "Built to Last" - 5:30
2. "American Panorama" - 3:20
3. "Fool's Gold" - 3:50
4. "Hotel Deville" - 4:41
5. "Cougars & Gigolos" - 4:14
6. "Route 66" - 3:23
7. "In the Shadow of Giants" - 4:08
8. "Black Oak" - 4:29
9. "We Made A New World" - 3:20
10. "Monument/Monolith" - 5:58
11. "Firefly" - 4:27
12. "Built to Last (Classical Guitar Reprise)" - 1:50

Bonus Tracks

1. "Fool's Gold (Orchestral)" - 2:59
2. "Black Oak (Orchestral)" - 3:20
3. "Hotel Deville (Orchestral)" - 2:55
4. "Built to Last (Orchestral)" - 3:33

== Personnel ==
The Rippingtons

- Russ Freeman – keyboards, programming, guitars
- Bill Heller – keyboards, acoustic piano
- Rico Belled – bass
- Dave Karasony – drums
- Jeff Kashiwa – saxophone (6, 11)

With:

- Zakk Wylde – guitar solo (10)

=== Production ===
- Andi Howard – executive producer, management
- Russ Freeman – executive producer, producer, all orchestrations and brass arrangements, recording, mixing, liner notes
- Adam Klumpp – additional engineer (guitar solo on Track 10)
- Bernie Grundman – mastering at Bernie Grundman Mastering (Hollywood, California)
- Paul Grosso – creative director
- Sean Marlowe – art direction, design
- Bill Mayer – cover art illustration
