= Côte D'Azur (album) =

Cote D'Azur

Studio album by The Rippingtons
- Released: February 1, 2011
- Studios: Surfboard Studios (Boca Raton, Florida)
- Genre: Smooth jazz
- Length: 40:11
- Label: Peak
- Producer: Russ Freeman

The Rippingtons chronology
| Modern Art (2009) | Cote D'Azur (2011) | Built to Last (2012) |

Côte D'Azur is the fifteenth studio album by the American jazz group the Rippingtons, released in 2011 through Peak Records. The album features French, Latin, Gypsy and Euro rhythms. Saxophonist Jeff Kashiwa is featured on the album, returning for the second album in a row.

== Track listing ==
All songs composed by Russ Freeman, except Tracks 1 & 10 composed by Russ Freeman and Yaredt Leon.

1. "Cote D'Azur" - 4:21
2. "Le Calypso" - 3:32
3. "Bandol" - 3:50
4. "Sainte Maxime" - 4:15
5. "Postcards From Cannes" - 4:22
6. "Passage To Marseilles" - 3:40
7. "Provence" - 4:25
8. "Riviera Jam" - 3:25
9. "Rue Paradis" - 4:34
10. "Mesmerized" - 3:24

== Personnel ==
The Rippingtons

- Russ Freeman – keyboards, guitars, guitar synthesizer, main performer on album
- Bill Heller – keyboards
- Rico Belled – bass
- Dave Karasony – drums
- Jeff Kashiwa – saxophones, additional performer on album

=== Production ===
- Andi Howard – executive producer, management
- Russ Freeman – producer, executive producer, recording, mixing, additional package illustration
- Bernie Grundman – mastering at Bernie Grundman Mastering (Hollywood, California)
- Larissa Collins – art direction
- Devon Guillery – graphic design
- Bill Mayer – cover illustration
- Dave Hopley – photography
