= Fountain of Youth (album) =

Studio album by The Rippingtons
- Released: June 10, 2014
- Studio: Surfboard Studios (Marina del Rey, California)
- Genre: Smooth jazz
- Length: 45:00
- Label: eOne
- Producer: Russ Freeman

The Rippingtons chronology
Built to Last (2012)	Fountain of Youth (2014)	True Stories (2016)

Fountain of Youth is a 2014 album by The Rippingtons.

== Track listing ==
All music written by Russ Freeman.

1. "Spice Route" - 4:06
2. "Rivers of Gold" - 4:15
3. "North Shore" - 5:24
4. "We Will Live Forever" - 4:43
5. "The Sun King" - 4:14
6. "Fountain of Youth" - 4:05
7. "Emerald City" - 5:17
8. "Soul Riders" - 4:54
9. "Waterfalls of Bequia" - 2:58
10. "Garden of the Gods" - 5:04

== Personnel ==
The Rippingtons

- Russ Freeman – keyboards, guitars, electric sitar, bass and rhythm programming
- Bill Heller – keyboards
- Rico Belled – bass
- Dave Karasony – drums
- Jeff Kashiwa – saxophones

=== Production ===
- Andi Howard – executive producer, management
- Russ Freeman – producer, executive producer, arrangements, recording, mixing, sleeve notes, design, artwork
- Bernie Grundman – mastering at Bernie Grundman Mastering (Hollywood, California)
- Bill Mayer – cover artwork
