= David Garfield =

American songwriter

David Garfield (September 27, 1956 in Chicago, Illinois and grew up in St. Louis, Missouri) is an American keyboardist, songwriter, and record producer.

He has recorded with Smokey Robinson, Cher, Larry Carlton, Steve Lukather, Spinal Tap, George Benson, The Manhattan Transfer, Eros Ramazzotti, and The Rippingtons. He has performed with Freddie Hubbard, Boz Scaggs, Oleta Adams, Brenda Russell, Natalie Cole, and Michael Bolton. He is a founding member of Karizma and Los Lobotomys. He has been a songwriter, producer, bandleader, arranger, recording artist, record label owner (Creatchy Records), session and touring musician, musical director and composer of commissioned themes for global organizations.

== Biography ==
In addition to composing and performing music for Perfect Harmony, he has written several songs with Smokey Robinson, including "One Like You," which George Benson recorded on his 2009 album Songs & Stories. Garfield, who has been from time to time Benson's musical director since 1986, also arranged and produced Guitar Man. Garfield produced I Play The Piano, a DVD/Blu-Ray of Terry Trotter playing solo piano for AIX Media.

Garfield has been commissioned to write and produce theme songs and musical projects for several international organizations, including the composition and CD: "Pool of Friendship" for the European Aquatics Federation LEN (League of European Nations); the American Society of Cinematographers (ASC); and "Deep Within Each Man" (co-written with Phil Perry) for the Shorinji Kempo World Karate Foundation.

His first international release on Creatchy, 1997's Tribute To Jeff, was dedicated to drummer Jeff Porcaro. Garfield followed its Top Ten chart success with I Am The Cat… Man, and Giving Back. He re-released on Creatchy Records several collections from earlier in his career, including L.A. Keyboard Project, Recollections, and Seasons of Change.

Karizma's discography on Creatchy includes Dream Come True, Cuba, All The Way Live, (Forever in the) Arms of Love, Document, and Lost and Found. The other projects he has helmed for Creatchy include albums by guitarists Michael Landau and Michael O'Neill, saxophonists Brandon Fields and Larry Klimas and, most recently, former Toto bassist Mike Porcaro. Another Creatchy release, Los Lobotomys, is a collaboration with prominent members of the pop/rock band Toto, with whom Garfield has collaborated with many times throughout the years. Garfield also frequently does free-lance keyboard and production work for established and up and coming artists from across the U.S. and throughout the world.

In addition to his work with George Benson, Garfield continues ongoing musical relationships with numerous musicians, including Boz Scaggs and Natalie Cole. Over the years, he has recorded with Cher, Spinal Tap, The Rippingtons, Ratt, Larry Carlton, and Smokey Robinson; produced for Oleta Adams and Flora Purim; and has performed live with Michael Bolton, The Blues Brothers, Brenda Russell and Rick Braun, among others. Early in 2012, he was presented with the Hall of Fame Award from the Java Jazz Festival in Jakarta; Garfield has performed at the Indonesia event several times, most recently with saxophonist Gerald Albright and vocalist Alex Ligertwood. The same trio of musicians later performed at the Blue Note in Tokyo.

At the same time as he was performing his first gigs with Karizma in the mid-1970s, Garfield began working with jazz talents such as Willie Bobo, Freddie Hubbard, and Tom Scott. After establishing himself on the L.A. jazz scene, the keyboardist became a key part of the city's vast studio world during its heyday. These experiences ultimately led to composing opportunities for TV, film and commercials for such companies as NBC, Disney, Nippon Television, and RTL Germany. During the 1980s, Garfield arranged and produced many Japanese artists and went on to produce his own projects for release in Japan.

Reflecting on his diverse career, Garfield says, "It's creatively invigorating to have the opportunity to do so many interesting musical projects, to see so many amazing places throughout the world, and to work with some of the greatest musicians both in L.A. and overseas. I feel as though I am always learning from the artists and musicians I work with, not simply on a musical level, but also benefiting from their wealth of stories and life and career experiences. There are always unexpected thrills along the way, from opening with his band for Sergio Mendes or Jason Mraz to recording in a studio next to Paul McCartney or Alice in Chains and having the opportunity to meet and get to know them. I love being involved in so many different aspects of music and the feeling that I truly never know what's coming up next".

== Discography ==
=== As leader ===
- 1992: Seasons of Change
- 1998: I Am The Cat... Man (David Garfield and The Cats)
- 2003: Giving Back
- 2018: Jazz Outside The Box
- 2018: Jammin' Outside The Box
- 2019: Vox Outside The Box
- 2020: Holidays Outside The Box
- 2021: Stretchin' Outside The Box

David Garfield and Friends

- 1988: Music from Riding Bean
- 1989: L.A. Keyboard Project
- 1991: Recollections
- 1997: Tribute to Jeff Porcaro
- 2005: The State of Things

With Karizma

- 1983: Dream Come True
- 1986: Cuba
- 1987: All The Way Live (Revisited)
- 1989: (Forever In The) Arms of Love
- 2000: Document
- 2001: Lost and Found
- 2012: Perfect Harmony [3CD set]
- 2018: Live at 'Motion Blue' (Yokohama, Japan)
- 2018: Live at 'The Baked Potato' with Jeff Porcaro

With Los Lobotomys (with Steve Lukather)

- 1989: Los Lobotomys
- 1994: Candyman
- 2004: The Official Bootleg (Live)
- 2018: Los Lobotomys 3.0

=== As sideman ===
Brandon Fields

- 1989: Other Places

Steve Tavaglione

- 1989: Blue Tav

Michael Landau

- 1990: Tales from The Bulge

Pauline Wilson

- 2001: Tribute

Potato Salad (with Lenny Castro and Larry Klimas)

- 2004: Potato Salad

Mike Porcaro

- 2011: Brotherly Love

Jeff Baxter/Teddy Castellucci/James Harrah/Buzzy Feiten

- 1988: Guitar Workshop in L.A.

David Garfield with Alex Ligertwood

- 1995: Metro
- 1997: Tribute to Jeff (Revisited)
- 2003: Giving Back
- 2019: Alex Ligertwood Outside The Box

Latin Jazz Trio (with Luis Conte and Dave Carpenter)

- 2000: The Latin Jazz Trio (AIX Records)
