= Open Road (The Rippingtons album) =

Studio album by The Rippingtons
- Released: March 22, 2019
- Studio: Surfboard Studios (Marina Del Rey, California)
- Genre: Smooth jazz
- Length: 40:06
- Label: eOne
- Producer: Russ Freeman

The Rippingtons chronology
True Stories (2016)	Open Road (2019)

Open Road is the final studio album by The Rippingtons, released in 2019.

== Track listing ==
As stated on the cover, all songs predominantly feature Russ Freeman.

No.	Title	Length
1.	"Silver Arrows"	3:02
2.	"Lost Highway"	4:01
3.	"Follow the Stars"	3:17
4.	"Before Sunrise"	3:32
5.	"Travels Among the Ruins"	4:44
6.	"Open Road"	4:41
7.	"She's Got the Magic"	3:48
8.	"Midnight Ride"	4:06
9.	"Luca"	2:59
10.	"Gran Via"	5:21
11.	"Tangerine Skyline"	2:35
Total length:		40:06

== Personnel ==
The Rippingtons

- Russ Freeman – keyboards, guitars, pedal steel guitar, bass, rhythm programming, percussion
- Bill Heller – keyboards (not featured on album)
- Rico Belled – bass (not featured on album)
- Dave Karasony – drums
- Brandon Fields – saxophones (3, 7, 10)

=== Production ===
- Andi Howard – executive producer, management
- Russ Freeman – executive producer, producer, recording, mixing
- Danielle Harwood – A&R, production manager
- Isabel Evans – A&R administration
- John McDonald – production manager
- Victor Morante – production manager, director, inventory manager
- Paul Grosso – creative director
- Sean Marlowe – art direction
- Bill Mayer – cover artwork
