= Let It Ripp =

Studio album by The Rippingtons
- Released: May 6, 2003
- Recorded: 2002
- Studios: Swamp Rat Studios (Boca Raton, Florida); Sapphire Sound (Las Vegas, Nevada); The Barn (Shadow Hills, California)
- Genre: Smooth jazz
- Length: 48:58
- Label: Peak
- Producer: Russ Freeman

The Rippingtons chronology
| Live Across America (2002) | Let It Ripp (2003) | Wild Card (2005) |

Professional ratings
Review scores
| Source | Rating |
|---|---|
| Allmusic | 4/5 stars |

Let It Ripp is the twelfth studio album by the American jazz group the Rippingtons, released in 2003 through Peak Records.

== Track listing ==
All songs composed by Russ Freeman.

1. "Let It Ripp" - 5:09
2. "Mr. 3" - 4:31
3. "Lucky Charm" - 5:15
4. "A Private Getaway" - 4:27
5. "High Life" - 5:15
6. "Avalon" - 4:04
7. "Bella Luna" - 3:56
8. "Stingray" - 4:44
9. "17 Mile Drive" - 4:12
10. "Cast a Spell" - 4:22
11. "Get Over It" - 4:23

== Personnel ==
The Rippingtons

- Russ Freeman – keyboards, guitars, guitar synthesizer
- Bill Heller – keyboards
- Kim Stone – bass
- Dave Karasony – drums
- Scott Breadman – percussion
- Eric Marienthal – saxophones

Horn section (Tracks 1, 2, 5, 8 & 9)

- Steven Holtman – trombone
- Gary Grant – trumpet
- Jerry Hey – trumpet

=== Production ===
- Andi Howard – executive producer, management
- Russ Freeman – executive producer, producer, arrangements, recording
- Marko Ruffalo – additional engineer
- Nick Sodano – mixing
- Robert Hadley – mastering
- Doug Sax – mastering
- The Mastering Lab (Hollywood, California) – mastering location
- Valerie Ince – A&R coordinator
- Leilani Shelby – production coordinator
- Sonny Mediana – art direction, photography
- Nancy Fisher – stylist
- Jennifer Guerrero – hair, make-up
