= Moonlighting (The Rippingtons album) =

Studio album by the Rippingtons
- Released: 1986
- Recorded: July 11 – August 8, 1986
- Studio: Juniper (Glendale California)
- Genres: Smooth jazz, jazz fusion
- Length: 41:35
- Labels: Passport Jazz, GRP, Alfa Moon (Japan)
- Producer: Russ Freeman

The Rippingtons chronology
Moonlighting (1986)	Kilimanjaro (1988)

Moonlighting is the debut studio album by the contemporary jazz ensemble the Rippingtons. It was released in 1986 on Passport Jazz and GRP labels, and reached number 5 on Billboard's Jazz chart. It was released initially in Japan by Alfa Moon with its subsidiary label The Baked Potato as Moon Riding, using the alias for The Rippingtons called Cruise Control. This is the first appearance of the Jazz Cat on the album cover by artist Bill Mayer. The Jazz Cat has since been on the cover of every Rippingtons album.

== Track listing and personnel ==
(All songs written by Russ Freeman).

1. "Moonlighting" – 6:41
  - Russ Freeman – electric guitar and solo, keyboards, Linn 9000 drum programming
  - Brandon Fields – alto saxophone
  - Gregg Karukas – additional keyboards
  - Tony Morales – cymbals and hi-hat
  - Steve Reid – EMU percussion programming, soundscapes
  - Jimmy Johnson – fretless bass and solo
2. She Likes to Watch – 5:33
  - Russ Freeman – electric guitar, guitar synthesizers, keyboards, Linn 9000 programming
  - Kenny G – soprano saxophone
  - Gregg Karukas – additional keyboards
  - Tony Morales – cymbals and hi-hat
  - Steve Reid – EMU percussion
  - Bill Lanphier – electric bass
3. Angela – 4:45
  - Russ Freeman – classical guitar, guitar synthesizer, keyboard bass
  - David Benoit – acoustic piano
  - Gregg Karukas – keyboards
  - Tony Morales – cymbals and hi-hat
  - Steve Reid – EMU percussion, Linn 9000 drum programming, keyboards
4. Dreams – 5:08
  - Russ Freeman – guitar synthesizer, keyboards, Linn 9000 drum programming
  - Dave Koz – EWI (or lyricon)
  - David Benoit – acoustic piano
  - Gregg Karukas – additional keyboards
  - Tony Morales – cymbals and hi-hat
  - Steve Reid – EMU percussion
  - Jimmy Johnson – fretless bass and solo
5. Mirage – 4:18
  - Russ Freeman – guitar synthesizer, keyboards
  - David Benoit – acoustic piano
  - Brandon Fields – alto saxophone
  - Gregg Karukas - keyboards
  - Steve Reid – Linn 9000 drum programming, EMU percussion and soundscapes
6. Calypso Café – 4:42
  - Russ Freeman – electric guitars, guitar synthesizers
  - Brandon Fields – alto saxophone
  - Gregg Karukas – rhythm keyboards
  - Tony Morales – drums
  - Steve Reid – EMU percussion and soundscapes
  - Bill Lanphier – electric bass
7. Open All Night – 4:48
  - Russ Freeman – electric guitar, guitar synthesizer, keyboards, Linn 9000 programming
  - Kenny G – soprano saxophone
  - Gregg Karukas – additional keyboards
  - Tony Morales – cymbals and hi-hat
  - Steve Reid – EMU percussion and programming
8. Intimate Strangers – 5:40
  - Russ Freeman – acoustic guitar, keyboards, Linn 9000 drum programming
  - Dave Koz – EWI (or lyricon)
  - David Benoit – acoustic piano
  - Gregg Karukas – additional keyboards
  - Tony Morales – cymbals and hi-hat
  - Steve Reid – EMU percussion and programming
  - Jimmy Johnson – fretless bass

== Production ==
- Russ Freeman – producer, arrangements, mixing
- Steven Sharp – engineer, mixing
- Steve Reid – mixing
- Bill Mayer – front cover artwork
- Kathleen Covert – art direction, design
- Jim Snowden – executive producer

== Charts ==
Chart (1989)	Peak position
Billboard Jazz Albums	5
