= My True Story =

My True Story may refer to:

- My True Story (song), a 1961 single by The Jive Five
- My True Story (film), a 1951 American romantic crime drama film
- My True Story (radio and TV series), an American radio series, later a TV series

== See also ==
- True Story (disambiguation)
