= Nocturnal Playground =

Studio album by Russ Freeman
- Released: April 10, 1986
- Recorded: November 18 – December 3, 1985
- Studio: Juniper Recording Studio (Burbank, California)
- Genre: Jazz
- Length: 42:37
- Label: Brainchild; Alfa International (Japan)
- Producer: Dean Whitney

Russ Freeman chronology
Nocturnal Playground (1986)	Sahara (1994)

Nocturnal Playground is the first album by American guitarist Russ Freeman, released on April 10, 1986 by Brainchild Records. In Japan, it was released by Alfa International. After this album, Freeman formed the band the Rippingtons. Several tracks from the album appeared on The Weather Channel in its infancy, and were later used on News at 11 by Cat System Corp. The album peaked at #10 on the Billboard Top Jazz Albums Chart.

== Track listing ==
All tracks are written by Russ Freeman.

No.	Title	Length
1.	"Nocturnal Playground"	6:36
2.	"Polo in the Palisades"	5:26
3.	"What She Really Wants"	4:34
4.	"Jamaican Nights"	5:30
5.	"Easter Island"	5:34
6.	"Moving Violation"	5:50
7.	"Amelia"	4:39
8.	"Paradise Cove"	4:28

== Personnel ==
- Russ Freeman – Emulator II, electric guitars, classical guitars, guitar synthesizer, keyboard bass, Linn 9000 programming
- David Vasquez – rhythm keyboards
- Mike Watts – acoustic piano on "Amelia"
- David Renick – drums, percussion
- Steve Reid – percussion, Emulator II programming
- Brandon Fields – alto saxophone

=== Production ===
- Dean Whitney – producer
- Stephen Sharp – engineer
- Jim Emrich – assistant engineer
- Steve Hall – mastering at Future Disc Systems (Hollywood, California)
- Loni Spector – cover photography
- Stylianos – back cover photography
- Kathleen Covert – art direction, design
