= Life in the Tropics =

Studio album by The Rippingtons
- Released: October 10, 2000
- Recorded: 2000
- Studios: Swamp Rat Studios (Boca Raton, Florida); Rumbo Recorders (Canoga Park, California); Sapphire Sound (Las Vegas, Nevada); Remidi Studios (Dobbs Ferry, New York); Sound On Sound Studios (New York City, New York)
- Genre: Smooth jazz
- Length: 48:14
- Label: Peak
- Producers: Russ Freeman; Gary Brown

The Rippingtons chronology
Topaz (1999)	Life in the Tropics (2000)	Live Across America (2002)

Life in the Tropics is the eleventh studio album by the American jazz group the Rippingtons. Released in 2000, it was the group's first release on Peak Records. The album reached No. 3 on Billboard's contemporary jazz chart.

== Track listing ==
All tracks written by Russ Freeman except "Rhythm of Your Life" written by Michael Angelo Saulsberry and "I Found Heaven" written by Gary Brown and Russ Freeman.

1. "Club Paradiso" – 4:23
2. "Caribbean Breeze" – 4:23
3. "Cruisin' Down Ocean Drive" – 4:38
4. "Be Cool" – 4:25
5. "Rhythm of Your Life" – 4:00
6. "Love Child" – 4:20
7. "Avenida del Mar" – 5:17
8. "I Found Heaven" – 4:24
9. "South Beach Mambo" – 4:47
10. "Life in the Tropics" – 4:56
11. "Island Aphrodisiac" – 4:41

== Personnel ==
The Rippingtons

- Russ Freeman – keyboards (1–4, 6, 7, 9, 11), acoustic guitar (1), bass (1, 3, 4, 11), rhythm programming (1), classical guitar (2, 5, 8), guitars (3, 4, 6, 7, 9–11), vocals (9), additional keyboards (10)
- David Kochanski – keyboards (does not play on album)
- Kim Stone – bass (2, 3, 6, 7, 9, 10)
- David Hooper – drums (1–5, 7, 9–11), vocals (9)
- Ramon Yslas – percussion (2–5, 7, 9–11)

Guest Musicians

- Bill Heller – acoustic piano (3, 7), keyboards (5, 6), arrangements (5), rhythm programming (6)
- Gary Brown – keyboards (8), bass (8), rhythm programming (8), backing vocals (8)
- Bob James – keyboards (10)
- Mark Binder – additional programming (10)
- Peter White – classical guitar (2)
- Eric Marienthal – saxophone (1, 3), tenor saxophone (6)
- Dave Koz – saxophone (4)
- Paul Taylor – alto saxophone (6)
- Bill Reichenbach, Jr. – trombone (5, 7, 9)
- Gary Grant – trumpet (5, 7, 9)
- Jerry Hey – trumpet (5, 7, 9)
- Ramon Flores – trumpet solo (9), trumpet (11)

Guest Vocalists

- Daisy Villa – lead vocals (5), backing vocals (5), vocals (9)
- Michael Angelo – backing vocals (5)
- Andi Howard – backing vocals (5)
- Howard Hewett – lead vocals (8)
- Laurie Hooper – vocals (9)

=== Production ===
- Andi Howard – executive producer, production manager, management
- Russ Freeman – executive producer, producer, recording, mixing
- Michael Angelo Salusberry – vocal producer (5)
- Gary Brown – producer (8)
- Mark Binder – additional engineer
- Ken Freeman – additional engineer
- Posie Muladi – additional engineer
- Nick Sodano – additional engineer
- Robert Hadley – mastering
- Doug Sax – mastering
- The Mastering Lab (Hollywood, California) – mastering location
- Alexis Davis – A&R
- MAD Design – art direction
- Bill Mayer – cover artwork
- David Hooper – studio photography

== Charts ==
Chart (2000)	Peak position
US Billboard Jazz Albums	3
