= Drive (Russ Freeman album) =

Album by Russ Freeman

Studio album by Russ Freeman
- Released: 2002
- Recorded: 2002 at Boca Rio Studios = Boca Raton, Florida.
- Genre: Smooth jazz, jazz fusion
- Length: 46:11
- Label: Peak Records
- Producer: Russ Freeman

Russ Freeman chronology
From the Redwoods to the Rockies (1998)	Drive (2002)	The Benoit/Freeman Project 2 (2004)

Drive is an album by the American guitarist Russ Freeman, released in 2002 for the Peak label. This album reached #7 on Billboard's Contemporary Jazz chart.

== Track listing ==
All songs written by Russ Freeman, except where noted.

1. "Guitarland" - 4:47
2. "Villa By the Sea" - 4:54
3. "Soul Dance" (Russ Freeman / Barry Eastmond) - 4:41
4. "Brighter Day" - 4:32
5. "Boys of Summer" (Mike Campbell / Don Henley) - 4:36
6. "Anywhere Near You" (Russ Freeman / Barry Eastmond) - 4:45
7. "Drive" - 4:30
8. "Cool In the Shade" - 4:16
9. "East River Drive" (Grover Washington, Jr.) - 4:35
10. "Bellagio" - 4:16
11. "Higher Love" (Steve Winwood / Will Jennings) - 4:04*
- Bonus track included on Special Edition release

== Personnel ==
- Russ Freeman - Guitar, Keyboards
- Chris Botti - Trumpet
- Barry Eastmond - Keyboards
- Bill Heller - Keyboards
- Jeff Lorber - Keyboards
- Eric Marienthal - Saxophone
- Jason Miles - Keyboards
- Jeff Mirinov - Guitar
- Will Lee - Bass
- Buddy Williams - Drums
- Pablo Batista - Percussion

== Charts ==
Chart (2002)	Peak position
Billboard Jazz Albums	7
