= Wild Card (The Rippingtons album) =

Studio album by The Rippingtons
- Released: May 17, 2005
- Studios: Castle Oaks Recording (Calabasas, California); Latinum Music Studios (Miami, Florida); Surfboard Studios (Boca Raton, Florida)
- Genre: Smooth jazz
- Length: 52:49
- Label: Peak
- Producers: Russ Freeman; Steve Sykes

The Rippingtons chronology
| Let It Ripp (2003) | Wild Card (2005) | 20th Anniversary (2006) |

Professional ratings
Review scores
| Source | Rating |
|---|---|
| AllMusic | 3.5/5 stars |

Wild Card is the thirteenth studio album by the American jazz group the Rippingtons, released in 2005 through Peak Records.

== Track listing ==
CD
| No. | Title | Writer(s) | Length |
|---|---|---|---|
| 1. | "Gypsy Eyes" | Russ Freeman; Yaredt Leon | 4:20 |
| 2. | "Wild Card" | Russ Freeman | 3:56 |
| 3. | "El Vacilón" | Russ Freeman; Yaredt Leon | 4:47 |
| 4. | "Paradise" | Russ Freeman | 5:04 |
| 5. | "Spanish Girl" | Russ Freeman | 4:15 |
| 6. | "Mulata de Mi Amor" | Russ Freeman; Yaredt Leon | 4:08 |
| 7. | "Moonlight" | Russ Freeman | 3:51 |
| 8. | "Til You Come Back to Me" | Stevie Wonder; Clarence Paul; Morris Broadnax | 4:00 |
| 9. | "Lay It Down" | Russ Freeman | 4:11 |
| 10. | "King of Hearts" | Russ Freeman; Yaredt Leon | 4:10 |
| 11. | "Into You" | Russ Freeman; Rex Rideout | 3:57 |
| 12. | "Mulata de Mi Amor (Instrumental)" | Russ Freeman; Yaredt Leon | 3:56 |
| 13. | "In the End" | Russ Freeman | 4:14 |

== Personnel ==
The Rippingtons

- Russ Freeman – keyboards, guitars, rhythm programming, arrangements (1–7, 9–13)
- Bill Heller – keyboards, acoustic piano
- Kim Stone – bass
- Dave Karasony – drums
- Scott Breadman – percussion
- Eric Marienthal – saxophones

Additional personnel

- Bill Reichenbach Jr. – trombone
- Gary Grant – trumpet
- Jerry Hey – trumpet
- Ralph Sutton – arrangements (8)
- Lloyd Talbot – arrangements (8)
- Albita Rodriguez – lead vocals (3)
- Asdru Sierra – backing vocals (3)
- Sheffer Bruton – backing vocals (3)
- Willy Chirino – lead and backing vocals (6)
- Chanté Moore – lead and backing vocals (8)

=== Production ===
- Andi Howard – executive producer
- Mark Wexler – executive producer
- Russ Freeman – executive producer, producer
- Steve Sykes – associate producer, recording, mixing
- Hatsukazu Inagaki – additional recording
- Marko Ruffalo – additional recording
- Cornell "Doc" Wiley – additional recording
- Sonny Mediana – art direction
- MAD Design – art direction
- Bill Mayer – illustration
- Carl Studna – photography
