= Brave New World (The Rippingtons album) =

Studio album by The Rippingtons
- Released: February 27, 1996
- Recorded: 1995
- Genres: Jazz, smooth jazz
- Length: 52:08
- Label: GRP
- Producers: Russ Freeman; Magic Mendez

The Rippingtons chronology
| Sahara (1994) | Brave New World (1996) | Black Diamond (1997) |

Brave New World is the eighth studio album by the American jazz group the Rippingtons, released in 1996 through GRP Records. The album reached No. 4 on Billboard's contemporary jazz chart. It was the group's final release on the GRP label.

== Track listing ==
All songs written by Russ Freeman except as noted.

1. "Brave New World" - 4:14
2. "Urban Wanderer" - 4:41
3. "Key to the Forbidden City" - 4:46
4. "Hideaway" - 5:10
5. "Caravan of Love" (Ernie Isley, Marvin Isley, Chris Jasper) - 4:04
6. "Faith" - 4:32
7. "First Time I Saw Her" - 4:25
8. "Cicada" - 5:43
9. "While My Guitar Gently Weeps" (George Harrison) - 4:44
10. "Ain't No Stoppin' Us Now" (Gene McFadden, John Whitehead, Jerry Cohen) - 4:43
11. "Virtual Reality" - 5:06

== Personnel ==
The Rippingtons

- Russ Freeman – keyboards, guitars, guitar synthesizer
- David Kochanski – acoustic piano solo (4)
- Kim Stone – electric bass, arco bass
- Tony Morales – drums
- Steve Reid – percussion
- Jeff Kashiwa – alto saxophone, soprano saxophone, tenor saxophone, EWI

Additional Musicians

- Eric Marienthal – saxophone (1, 3)
- Brandon Fields – saxophone (7, 11)
- Steven Holtman – trombone
- Bill Reichenbach Jr. – trombone
- Gary Grant – trumpet
- Jerry Hey – trumpet
- Magic Mendez – all other instruments (5, 10), musical arrangements (5, 10)

Vocals

- Phil Perry – lead vocals (5)
- Wallace "Scotty" Scott – lead vocals (5, 10)
- Walter Scott – lead vocals (5, 10)
- Magic Mendez – backing vocals (5, 10), vocal arrangements (5, 10)
- The Whispers – backing vocals (5, 10)
- Bridgette Bryant – vocals (9)
- Lynne Fiddmont – vocals (9)
- Lillian Tynes – vocals (9)
- Harmony Blackwell – additional backing vocals (10)
- Mariah Garrett – additional backing vocals (10)
- Merrily Garrett – additional backing vocals (10)
- Starr Mendez – additional backing vocals (10)

=== Production ===
- AndI Howard – executive producer (1–4, 6–9, 11), production coordinator, manager
- Russ Freeman – executive producer (1–4, 6–9, 11), producer (1–4, 6–9, 11), recording (1–4, 6–9, 11), mixing (1–4, 6–9, 11)
- Nicholas Caldwell – executive producer (5, 10)
- Magic Mendez – producer (5, 10), recording (5, 10), mixing (5, 10)
- Alan Hirschberg – additional recording (1–4, 6–9, 11)
- Harmony Blackwell – assistant engineer (5, 10)
- Meriah Garrett – assistant engineer (5, 10)
- Doug Sax – mastering
- Hollis King – art direction, graphic design
- Robin Lynch – art direction
- Jim Gurney – photography
- Carl Studna – photography
- Karen Wood – make-up
- Lucia Mace – hair styling
- David K – stylist
- Gardner Howard Ringe Entertainment – management company

Studios

- Tracks 1–4, 6–9 & 11 recorded and mixed at Cheyenne Mountain Ranch Studios (Colorado); Additional recording at Pacifique Recorders and Alpha Studios (Burbank, California).
- Tracks 5 & 10 recorded and mixed at Magic Muzik Studios (Moorpark, California).
- Mastered at The Mastering Lab (Hollywood, California).

== Charts ==
| Chart (1995) | Peak position |
|---|---|
| US Billboard Jazz Albums | 4 |
