= Kilimanjaro (The Rippingtons album) =

Studio album by the Rippingtons
- Released: April 24, 1988
- Recorded: November 5 to December 22, 1987
- Studios: Take One (Burbank, California)
- Genres: Smooth jazz, jazz fusion
- Length: 43:57
- Labels: Passport Jazz, GRP
- Producer: Russ Freeman

The Rippingtons chronology
Moonlighting (1986)	Kilimanjaro (1988)	Tourist in Paradise (1989)

Kilimanjaro is the second studio album by the American Jazz group the Rippingtons, released in 1988 for Passport Jazz Records, and later reissued under the GRP label. Kilimanjaro reached No. 3 on Billboard's Jazz chart.

== Track listing and personnel ==
(All tracks composed by Russ Freeman except where noted).

1. "Morocco" - 4:50
  - Russ Freeman – electric guitar, guitar synthesizer, keyboards and programming
  - Jimmy Johnson – fretless bass
  - Vinnie Colaiuta – drums
  - Tony Morales – additional cymbals
  - Steve Reid – percussion
  - Dave Koz – alto saxophone
2. "Northern Lights" - 4:41
  - Russ Freeman – classical and electric guitars, guitar synthesizer, keyboards and programming
  - Jimmy Johnson – fretless bass
  - Tony Morales – drums
  - Steve Reid – percussion
3. "Dream of the Sirens" - 5:38
  - Russ Freeman – electric guitar, guitar synthesizer, keyboards, Linn 9000 drum programming
  - David Garfield – synthesizer solo
  - Bill Lanphier – fretless bass
  - Tony Morales – cymbals
  - Steve Reid – percussion
4. "Katrina's Dance" - 5:59
  - Russ Freeman – electric and acoustic guitars, guitar synthesizer, keyboards and programming
  - Jimmy Haslip – bass
  - Tony Morales – drums
  - Steve Reid – percussion
  - Brandon Fields – alto saxophone
5. "Kilimanjaro" - 4:47
  - Russ Freeman – electric guitar, guitar synthesizer, keyboards, Linn 9000 drum programming
  - Brandon Fields – alto saxophone
  - Steve Reid – percussion and soundscape
6. "Back Stabbers" (Leon Huff / John Whitehead / Gene McFadden) - 4:08
  - Russ Freeman – acoustic and electric guitars, keyboards
  - David Garfield – additional keyboards
  - Jimmy Johnson – electric bass
  - Vinnie Colaiuta – drums
  - Steve Reid – percussion
  - Brandon Fields – alto saxophone
7. "Love Notes" - 4:15
  - Russ Freeman – electric guitar, guitar synthesizer, keyboards and programming
  - David Garfield – acoustic piano solo
  - Jimmy Haslip – bass
  - Vinnie Colaiuta – drums
  - Steve Reid – percussion
  - Brandon Fields – alto and tenor saxophones
8. "Los Cabos!" - 4:09
  - Russ Freeman – electric guitar, guitar synthesizer, keyboards and programming
  - David Garfield – acoustic piano solo
  - Jimmy Johnson – electric bass
  - Vinnie Coluaita – drums
  - Steve Reid – percussion
  - Brandon Fields – flute
9. "Oceansong" - 5:30
  - Russ Freeman – classical and electric guitars, guitar synthesizer, keyboards and programming
  - Jimmy Johnson – fretless bass
  - Bill Lanphier – bass
  - Tony Morales – drums
  - Steve Reid – percussion
  - Brandon Fields – alto saxophone

== Production ==
- Russ Freeman – producer, arrangements, mixing
- Brad Gilderman – engineer, mixing
- Micajah Ryan – engineer
- Alan Hirschberg – additional engineer
- Bill Mayer – cover illustration
- Murray Brenman – design
- Dean Whitney – executive producer
- Ann Summa – back cover photography

== Charts ==
Chart (1988)	Peak position
US Billboard Jazz Albums	3
