= Tourist in Paradise =

Studio album by the Rippingtons
- Released: May 15, 1989
- Recorded: 1987
- Studios: Slam Shack (North Hollywood, California)
- Genres: Smooth jazz, jazz fusion
- Length: 44:10
- Label: GRP
- Producer: Russ Freeman

The Rippingtons chronology
Kilimanjaro (1988)	Tourist in Paradise (1989)	Welcome to the St. James' Club (1990)

Tourist in Paradise is the third studio album by the American jazz group the Rippingtons, released in 1989 on GRP Records. The album is primarily the work of Russ Freeman, who acted as producer, arranger, and composer. Tourist in Paradise reached No. 4 on Billboard's Jazz chart.

== Track listing ==
All tracks composed by Russ Freeman except where noted

1. "Tourist in Paradise" - 5:39
2. "Jupiter's Child" - 5:17
3. "Aruba!" - 4:15
4. "One Summer Night in Brazil" - 6:28
5. "Earthbound" - 4:37
6. "Let's Stay Together" (Willie Mitchell, Al Green, Al Jackson) - 4:47
7. "One Ocean Way" - 4:19
8. "Destiny" - 5:40
9. "The Princess" - 3:08

== Personnel ==
The Rippingtons

- Russ Freeman – synthesizers, acoustic guitar, electric guitar, guitar synthesizer, programming, Linn 9000 drum programming, arrangements
- Steve Bailey – bass
- Tony Morales – cymbals and hi-hat (1–3, 5, 6, 8), drums (4, 7, 9)
- Steve Reid – percussion, soundscapes
- Brandon Fields – alto saxophone (1, 2, 5–9), soprano saxophone (4)

Additional musicians

- Rob Mullins – keyboards (3)
- Carl Anderson – vocals (1–3)

Production

- Dave Grusin – executive producer
- Larry Rosen – executive producer
- Russ Freeman – producer, recording, mixing, digital editing
- Steve Reid – recording, mixing
- Ted Blaisdell – additional engineer
- Micajah Ryan – additional engineer
- Ted Jensen – mastering at Sterling Sound (New York City, New York)
- Suzanne Sherman – production coordinator
- Andy Baltimore – creative director, graphic design
- Bill Mayer – front cover artwork
- David Gibb – graphic design
- Dave Kunze – graphic design
- Dan Serrano – graphic design
- Chris Cuffaro – photography

== Charts ==
Chart (1989)	Peak position
US Billboard Jazz Albums	4
