= Carl Anderson (singer) =

American singer and actor (1945–2004)

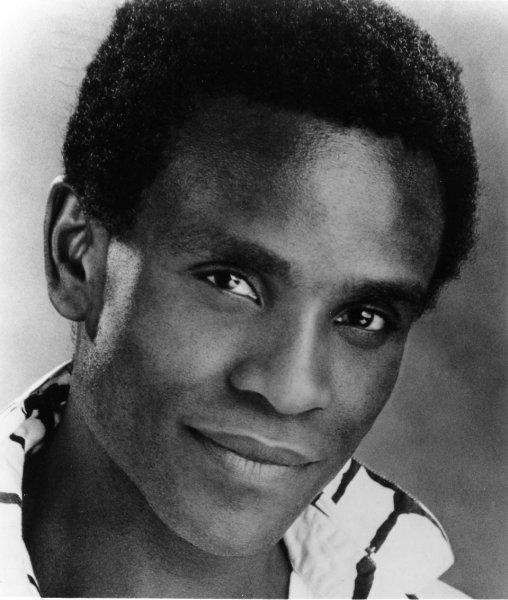
- Born: Carlton Earl Anderson; February 27, 1945; Lynchburg, Virginia, U.S.
- Died: February 23, 2004 (aged 58); Los Angeles, California, U.S.
- Education: Howard University
- Occupations: Singer, actor
- Years active: 1965–2004
- Spouse: Veronica Porché (m. 1992)
- Children: 1

Carlton Earl "Carl" Anderson (February 27, 1945 – February 23, 2004) was an American singer, film and theater actor best known for his portrayal of Judas Iscariot in the Broadway and film versions of the rock opera Jesus Christ Superstar by Andrew Lloyd Webber and Tim Rice. He and Gloria Loring performed the duet "Friends and Lovers", which reached No. 2 on the Billboard Hot 100 chart in 1986.

== Life and career ==
=== Early life ===
Born in Lynchburg, Virginia, Anderson was one of 12 children of James and Alberta Anderson. During his junior year of high school, Anderson enlisted in the U.S. Air Force, where he served as a communications technician for two years. He returned to Lynchburg to complete high school and graduated in 1965. With his honorable discharge, following high school, Anderson sang at military bases across the United States as part of the World Wide Air Force Talent Contest.

Anderson moved to Washington, D.C., in 1969, where he studied psychology at Howard University. He and some friends also formed a group called "The Second Eagle", with Anderson as lead singer. Among the many jazz and rock tunes that the Second Eagle covered were some from the album Jesus Christ Superstar, which had not been released in the United States yet.

In 1971, Anderson and his band performed some songs from the album at a Palm Sunday service; this performance was covered by the Today show. A producer for the American production of Jesus Christ Superstar saw the performance and offered him an audition.

=== Early career ===
Anderson played the role of Judas in the pre-Broadway touring company's production of Jesus Christ Superstar but was passed over for the initial 1971 Broadway production when producers opted for the more well-known Ben Vereen for the part, and was cast as an understudy. He took over the role performed it on Broadway and in Los Angeles when Vereen fell ill. After Vereen recovered, both actors took turns playing the role.

While performing in Los Angeles, Anderson was flown to London for a screen test for the film adaptation of the rock opera. Two weeks later, he left that production to begin filming in Israel alongside Ted Neeley and Yvonne Elliman, who were cast for the main roles as Jesus and Mary Magdalene, respectively. The film, released in 1973 by director Norman Jewison, earned Anderson two Golden Globe nominations as "Most Promising Newcomer" and "Best Musical Actor", as well as an NAACP Image Award.

In the late 1970s, he reprised his role as Judas for two regional productions in California, both under the auspices of the California Youth Theatre organization. Other films in which Anderson appeared include: The Black Pearl (1978) and Steven Spielberg's The Color Purple (1985). Television appearances include The Eddie Capra Mysteries, Cop Rock, Days of Our Lives, Rockford Files, and Hill Street Blues.

As a recording artist, Anderson was equally prolific. He signed with Motown Records in 1972. Several of the most recognizable albums to be released in the 1970s would bear the mark of Anderson, including his work with Stevie Wonder on his Songs in the Key of Life double album. He made numerous appearances at several notable clubs in Los Angeles during the 1970s and, with Columbia Records' talent scout Larkin Arnold, signed a record deal for which Anderson would release four albums on the Epic label beginning in 1982. In total, Anderson released nine jazz and Soul albums as a solo artist, including moderate successes "How Deep Does It Go" and "My Love Will", as well as the hit from his self-titled 1986 album, "Friends and Lovers", a duet with Gloria Loring. The song reached the number-two spot on the charts that year and endeared Anderson to soap opera fans, after he and Loring performed the song on Days of Our Lives. In 1989, Anderson recorded the song "Between You and Me", which was used as the title theme for the film Her Alibi. He also recorded on albums with other leading artists.

=== Later career ===
In 1992, Anderson reprised his role as Judas in Jesus Christ Superstar for a "20th Anniversary of the Movie" tour, alongside Neeley who also reprised his role as Jesus. Both men had agreed to do the tour only if they got to work together. Initially planned for three months, the production lasted five years and grossed over $100 million, visiting over 50 North American cities, including the Paramount Theater at Madison Square Garden in New York City, the Universal Amphitheater in Los Angeles, the Fox Theaters in Detroit, St. Louis and Atlanta, the Morris Mechanic Theatre in Baltimore, The Orpheum in San Francisco, Providence Performing Arts Center in Providence, Rhode Island, the Wang Center and Shubert Theater during multiple returns to Boston as well as dates in Washington, D.C., Philadelphia, Miami, Toronto, Vancouver and Montreal. All these showings allowed Anderson to reprise his role over 1,700 times.

In 1994, Anderson released an album titled Heavy Weather Sunlight Again which is full of soulful songs such as "Love'll Hold My Baby Tonight".

In 1997, Anderson performed on Broadway in an adaptation of William Shakespeare's Twelfth Night called Play On! Beginning in 1998, and in later years of his life, he reprised his role as Judas in Superstar to sold-out auditoriums around the world.

One of his later albums, Why We Are Here!, was recorded at the Agape International Spiritual Center, then located in Santa Monica, California. He continued to perform, with Linda Eder, in a show called Once in a Lifetime produced by Eder's then-husband, Frank Wildhorn.

In 2002, Anderson reprised his role as Judas in another national tour of Jesus Christ Superstar with ex-Skid Row singer Sebastian Bach playing Jesus. Bach received good reviews and Anderson was again praised. In April 2003, following a disagreement with the director, Bach walked out on the tour and was replaced with Broadway actor Eric Kunze. Bach considered Anderson a father-figure and good friend. Anderson stayed on the tour for three more months, but eventually left the show after being diagnosed with leukemia. The tour closed a year after his death.

=== Personal life and death ===
In 1992, Anderson married Veronica Porché, former wife of boxing legend Muhammad Ali.

In 2003, while performing with the national tour of Superstar that had started the previous year, Anderson was diagnosed with leukemia. According to a page on his memorial website, Anderson was involved in a minor car accident on his way to perform and, while being treated for his injuries, doctors discovered that he had leukemia. Anderson died from the illness on February 23, 2004, four days before his 59th birthday, in Los Angeles. The Leonard Cohen / Anjani song "Nightingale" (2004) was recorded in his memory.

== Discography ==
=== Solo ===
Year	Title
1982	Absence With Out Love: Released: 1982; Label: Epic
1984	On and On: Released: 1984; Label: Epic
1985	Protocol: Released: 1985; Label: Epic
1986	Carl Anderson: Released: 1986; Label: Epic
1988	Act of Love: Released: 1988; Label: Polydor
1990	Pieces of a Heart: Released: 1990; Label: GRP
1992	Fantasy Hotel: Released: 1992; Label: GRP
1994	Heavy Weather/Sunlight Again: Released: 1994; Label: GRP
1997	Why We Are Here! (live): Released: 1997; Label: Abu Khalil

=== Soundtracks and compilations ===
— indicates a solo contribution.

Year	Artist	Title	Contribution
1973	Original Motion Picture Soundtrack	Jesus Christ Superstar: Released: 1973 (25th anniversary reissue 1998); Label: MCA	Judas
1989	The Rippingtons	GRP: On the Cutting Edge (Various Artists): Released: 1989; Label: GRP	Vocals ("Tourist in Paradise")
1991	Garfield	Am I Cool or What? (Various Artists): Released: 1991; Label: GRP	Vocals ("Fat is Where It's At")
1992	—	GRP 10th Anniversary Collection (Various Artists): Released: 1992; Label: GRP	Vocals ("How Deep Does It Go")
1994	The Rippingtons	Jazz Live (Various Artists): Released: 1994; Label: GRP	Vocals ("Tourist in Paradise")
1996	Tim Rice	Collection: Stage & Screen Classics (Various Artists): Released: 1996; Label: Rhino	Vocals ("Heaven on Their Minds")
1997	The Rippingtons	The Best of The Rippingtons: Released: 1997; Label: GRP	Vocals
1997	Original Broadway Cast	Play On!: Released: 1997; Label: Varèse	The Duke
1999	Various Artists	The Civil War: The Complete Work: Released: 1999; Label: Atlantic	Vocals ("Sarah")

=== Other artists ===
Year	Artist	Title	Contribution
1976	Stevie Wonder	Songs in the Key of Life: Released: 1976; Label: Tamla	Background Vocals (uncredited)
1980	Menage a Trois	Menage a Trois: Released: 1980; Label: Ariola	Vocals
1981	Kazu Matsui Project	Time No Longer: Released: 1981; Label: Kazu	Vocals
1983	L.A. Jazz Choir	Listen...: Released: 1983; Label: Mobile Fidelity Sound Labs	Vocals ("I Only Have Eyes For You")
1983	Weather Report	Domino Theory: Released: 1983; Label: Columbia	Vocals ("Can It Be Done")
1984	Weather Report	Sportin' Life: Released: 1984; Label: Columbia	Vocals ("Corner Pocket," "Hot Cargo," "Ice-Pick Willy")
1985	Kenny Loggins	Vox Humana: Released: 1985; Label: Columbia	Background Vocals ("At Last")
1986	Joe Zawinul	Di•a•lects: Released: 1986; Label: Columbia	Ensemble Voice
1987	Nancy Wilson	Forbidden Lover: Released: 1987; Label: Epic	Vocals ("Forbidden Lover")
1987	Keiko Matsui	A Drop of Water: Released: 1987; Label: Passport Jazz	Background Vocals
1989	The Zawinul Syndicate	Black Water: Released: 1989; Label: Columbia	Vocals
1989	Dan Siegel	Late One Night: Released: 1989; Label: CBS Associated	Vocals
1989	Oceans	Ridin' the Tide: Released: 1989; Label: Pro-Jazz	Vocals
1989	The Rippingtons	Tourist in Paradise: Released: 1989; Label: GRP	Vocals
1990	Nancy Wilson	Lady with a Song: Released: 1990; Label: Epic	Background Vocals
1990	The Rippingtons	Welcome to the St. James' Club: Released: 1990; Label: GRP	Vocals
1991	Don Grusin	Zephyr: Released: 1991; Label: GRP	Background Vocals
1991	Peabo Bryson	Can You Stop the Rain: Released: 1991; Label: Columbia	Background Vocals ("Closer Than Close")
1991	Richard Elliot	On the Town: Released: 1991; Label: Blue Note	Vocals
1992	George Howard	Do I Ever Cross Your Mind?: Released: 1992; Label: GRP	Background Vocals ("Try Again," "Stay Here With Me")
1992	The Rippingtons	Live in L.A.: Released: 1992; Label: GRP	Vocals
1993	Eric Marienthal	One Touch: Released: 1993; Label: GRP	Vocals
1995	Kevin Toney	Pastel Mood: Released: 1995; Label: Ichiban	Vocals
1996	Michael Paulo	My Heart and Soul: Released: 1996; Label: Noteworthy	Vocals
1998	Nils	Blue Planet: Released: 1998; Label: Ichiban	Vocals
1999	Michael Paulo	Midnight Passion: Released: 1999; Label: Noteworthy	Vocals
1999	Gerald McCauley	The McCauley Sessions: Released: 1999; Label: Lightyear	Vocals
1999	L.A. Jazz Syndicate	L.A. Jazz Syndicate, Vol. 2: Released: 1999; Label: MCG	Vocals
2000	Brenda Russell	Paris Rain: Released: 2000; Label: Hidden Beach	Vocals
2002	Linda Eder	Gold: Released: 2002; Label: Atlantic	Vocals

== Theater and concert credits ==
Year	Title	Role
1971	Jesus Christ Superstar (pre-Broadway tour)	Judas Iscariot
1972	Jesus Christ Superstar (Broadway)	Judas Iscariot (understudy, later alternated with Ben Vereen)
1976-1977	Jesus Christ Superstar (California Youth Theatre organization)	Judas Iscariot (with Ted Neeley as Jesus and Yvonne Elliman as Mary)
1990	Jesus Christ Superstar (brief West Coast tour)	Judas Iscariot (with Barry Dennen as Pilate and Sam Harris as Jesus)
1992-1997	Jesus Christ Superstar (national tour)	Judas Iscariot (with Ted Neeley as Jesus, Dennis DeYoung as Pilate, Irene Cara/Syreeta Wright as Mary)
1997	Play On! (Broadway)	The Duke
1998	Jesus Christ Superstar (Rubicon Theatre Company)	Judas Iscariot (with Ted Neeley as Jesus)
1999	Linda Eder - Once in a Lifetime	Featured Vocalist (with Linda Eder and Douglas Sills)
1999-2000	Jesus Christ Superstar (Italian tour)	Judas Iscariot (also artistic director)
2002	Beggar's Holiday (Rubicon Theatre Company)	Mac
2002-2003	Jesus Christ Superstar (national tour)	Judas Iscariot (with Sebastian Bach as Jesus)

== Filmography ==
Year	Title	Role	Notes
1973	Jesus Christ Superstar	Judas Iscariot	
1977	The Black Pearl	Moro	
1985	The Color Purple	Reverend Samuel	
2015	Superstars: The Documentary	Himself/Judas Iscariot	
