= True Stories (The Rippingtons album) =

Studio album by The Rippingtons
- Released: June 24, 2016
- Genre: Smooth jazz
- Length: 42:17
- Label: eOne
- Producer: Russ Freeman

The Rippingtons chronology
Fountain of Youth (2014)	True Stories (2016)	Open Road (2019)

True Stories is a 2016 studio album by The Rippingtons.

== Track listing ==
All music written by Russ Freeman, except Track 4 written by Russ Freeman and Yaredt Leon.

1. "Wild Tales" - 4:30
2. "Sundance" - 4:18
3. "Flamenco Beach" - 4:19
4. "My Promise to You" - 4:06
5. "Reach Higher" - 4:20
6. "Dreamcatcher" - 3:32
7. "Wonderland" - 4:34
8. "Kings Road" - 4:02
9. "Golden Child" - 3:49
10. "True Stories" - 4:30

== Personnel ==
The Rippingtons

- Russ Freeman – keyboards, guitars, bass (1, 2, 4, 6–10), pedal steel guitar (2, 7, 9, 10), percussion (2–4), classical guitar (3)
- Rico Belled – Rhodes electric piano (5), bass (5)
- Dave Karasony – drums (1, 2, 4–10), timbales (1), tambourine (2), percussion (6, 8)
- Brandon Fields – saxophone (1, 2, 5, 6, 8, 9), soprano saxophone (10)

With:

- Jeffrey Osborne – vocals (4)

=== Production ===
- Andi Howard – executive producer, management
- Russ Freeman – producer, arrangements recording, mixing
- Scott Witherspoon – vocal recording (4)
- Bernie Grundman – mastering
- Sean Marlowe – art direction, design
- Bill Mayer – cover art illustration

Studios

- Recorded and Mixed at Surfboard Studios (Marina del Rey, California).
- Drums recorded at Midas Studios (Los Angeles, California).
- Mastered at Bernie Grundman Mastering (Hollywood, California).
