= Live Across America =

Live album by The Rippingtons
- Released: March 12, 2002
- Recorded: 1999–2000
- Genres: Smooth jazz Jazz fusion
- Length: 65:48
- Label: Windham Hill / Peak
- Producers: Russ Freeman; Nick Sodano

The Rippingtons chronology
Life in the Tropics (2000)	Live Across America (2002)	Let It Ripp (2003)

Professional ratings
Review scores
Source	Rating
Allmusic	3/5 stars

Live Across America is the second live album by The Rippingtons, released March 12, 2002.

== Track listing ==
1. "Road Warriors" - 4:15
2. "Summer Lovers" - 6:35
3. "Welcome to the St. James' Club" - 5:15
4. "Hideaway" - 3:57
5. "Black Diamond" - 5:00
6. "South Beach Mambo" - 4:39
7. "She Likes to Watch" - 5:38
8. "Jewel Thieves" - 8:34
9. "Rain" - 7:07
10. "Avenida del Mar" - 3:59
11. "Purple Haze / Fire Medley" - 1:42
12. "Fire" - 1:42
13. "The Star-Spangled Banner" - 2:46
14. "Are We There Yet?" - 4:29

== Personnel ==
The Rippingtons

- Russ Freeman – guitars
- David Kochanski – keyboards
- Kim Stone – bass
- Dave Hooper – drums
- Ray Yslas – percussion
- Paul Taylor – saxophone

With:

- Bill Heller – keyboards (2, 6, 9, 10)
- Dave Karasony – drums (2, 6, 9, 10)
- Scott Breadman – percussion (2, 6, 9, 10)
- Eric Marienthal – saxophone (2, 6, 9, 10)

=== Production ===
- Andi Howard – executive producer, management
- Russ Freeman – executive producer, producer, arrangements, mixing
- Nick Sodano – producer (1–5, 7–9), recording, mixing (1, 3–5, 7, 8)
- Kurt Wolf – recording assistant
- Cheyenne Mountain Ranch (Woodland Park, Colorado) – mixing location (1, 3–5, 7, 8)
- Boca Rio Studios (Boca Raton, Florida) – mixing location (2, 6, 9, 10)
- Robert Hadley – mastering
- Doug Sax – mastering
- The Mastering Lab (Hollywood, California) – mastering location
- Valerie Ince – A&R assistance
- Leilani Shelby – production coordinator
- Sonny Mediana – design
- Bill Mayer – cover artwork

Tour Crew

- Nick Sodano – tour manager, front house engineer
- D. Ogas – stage manager, monitor engineer
- Joe Allegro – lighting director
- Kurt Wolf – audio system technician
- Terry McNary – stage technician
- Carson Weed – stage technician
- Duane Hayes – road manager
