= Bass Extremes =

- Genres: Jazz, jazz fusion
- Members: Victor Wooten; Steve Bailey; Gregg Bissonette
- Past members: Derico Watson; Oteil Burbridge

Bass Extremes is a collaboration of bassists Victor Wooten and Steve Bailey. The project has produced three albums, the latest being S'Low Down, released in 2022. It has also released content on video and in a book of sheet music and tablature, transcribed by Roy Vogt.

The Bass Extremes project has also included drummer Derico Watson and Oteil Burbridge, and currently includes original drummer Gregg Bissonette.

== Discography ==
- Cookbook (1998)
- Just Add Water (2001)
- S'Low Down (2022)

== Bibliography ==
- (2006). "All that Bass." Harrisburg Patriot News. November 23.
- (2004). "Pop and Jazz Guide." The New York Times. September 17.
