= Variations on the Word Love =

Poem by Margaret Atwood

Variations on the Word Love is a poem about love by Margaret Atwood, who is regarded as one of Canada's greatest living writers. The poem appears in True Stories (Oxford University Press, 1981), her 9th poem collection, which is dedicated to Carolyn Forche. The poem was selected by Oprah Magazine as one of the "Beautiful Love Poems Begging to Be Shared."
