= Based on a True Story =

Based on a True Story may refer to:

== Albums ==
- Based on a T.R.U. Story, by 2 Chainz, 2012
- Based on a True Story..., by Blake Shelton, 2013
- Based on a True Story (The Del-Lords album), 1988
- Based on a True Story (Fat Freddy's Drop album), 2005
- Based on a True Story (Kimberley Locke album), 2007
- Based on a True Story (Lil' Mo album), 2001
- Based on a True Story (Mack 10 album) or the title song, 1997
- Based on a True Story (Sick of It All album), 2010
- Based on a True Story (Silkk the Shocker album), 2004
- Based on a True Story (The Starting Line album), 2005
- Based on a True Story (Trick Daddy album) or the title song, 1997
- Based on a True Story, by Øystein Sevåg, 2007
- Based on a True Story (Will Smith album), 2025
- Based on a True Story (Brynn Cartelli EP), 2021
- Based on a True Story, an EP by Jake Miller, 2019

== Film and television ==
- Based on a True Story (film), a 2017 film directed by Roman Polanski
- Based on a True Story (TV series), a 2023 comedy thriller series
- "Based on a True Story" (Arthur), a 2012 television episode
- "Based on a True Story" (Midnight Caller), a 1990 television episode

== Literature ==
- Based on a True Story, a 2008 short-story collection by Hesh Kestin
- Based on a True Story, a 2016 semi-fictional memoir by Norm Macdonald
- Based on a True Story, a 2015 novel by Delphine de Vigan

== See also ==
- Docudrama
- List of films based on actual events
- Non-fiction novel
- True Story (disambiguation)
- True Stories (disambiguation)
