= True Story =

True Story may refer to:

== Film and television ==
- True Story (film), a 2015 film
- True Story (miniseries), a 2021 limited American television series
- True Story with Hamish & Andy, a 2017–2018 Australian television series
  - True Story with Ed and Randall, a 2022 American adaptation; see List of Peacock original programming
- The True Story, documentary series

== Music ==
- True Story (album), an album by Terror Squad, 2004
- True Story, a mixtape by Future, 2011
- True Story, an album by Timaya, 2007
- "True Story" (song), by Ariana Grande, 2024

== Writing ==
- True Story (magazine), an American magazine founded in 1919
- A True Story, a satirical novel by Lucian of Samosata that is sometimes considered the oldest work of science fiction
- True Story: A Novel, a 1994 book by Bill Maher

== See also ==
- Nonfiction
- True Stories (disambiguation)
- Based on a True Story (disambiguation)
- Ravan Raaj: A True Story, a 1995 Indian film by T. Rama Rao
- Sacred Evil – A True Story, a 2006 Indian film
- Alice: A True Story, a 2014 Indian film
