= True Stories (poetry collection) =

Book by Margaret Atwood

First edition (publ. OUP)

True Stories is a collection of poetry by Canadian author Margaret Atwood, published in 1981. The collection is dedicated to poet Carolyn Forché with whom Atwood had discussed her trip to El Salvador as a member of Amnesty International, and the poems both directly and indirectly discuss her views regarding human rights in third-world nations.

The poems of True Stories confront the nature of poetry, question whether they may be conventionally defined as poetry. They diverge from the themes established in her previous poetry; they explore themes of atrocity, of war and torture. Ultimately, they confront whether “poems come from such horrors?”.

== See also ==
- Variations on the Word Love
