= Sahara (The Rippingtons album) =

Studio album by the Rippingtons
- Released: August 30, 1994
- Recorded: March – May 1994
- Studios: Cheyenne Mountain Ranch (Colorado); Ameraycan and The Slam Shack (North Hollywood, California)
- Genres: Smooth jazz, jazz fusion
- Length: 46:06
- Label: GRP
- Producer: Russ Freeman

The Rippingtons chronology
Live in L.A. (1992)	Sahara (1994)	Brave New World (1996)

Sahara is the seventh studio album by the American jazz group the Rippingtons, released in 1994 through GRP Records. The album reached number two on Billboard's Contemporary Jazz chart. It is also the first of two studio albums to be released under the name Russ Freeman & the Rippingtons, with the next being Brave New World.

== Track listing ==
All tracks written by Russ Freeman except where noted.

1. "Native Sons of a Distant Land" – 4:47
2. "True Companion" – 4:26
3. "I'll Be Around" (Phil Hurtt, Thomas Bell) – 4:04
4. "Principles of Desire" – 4:41
5. "Sahara" – 5:01
6. "'Til We're Together Again" – 5:17
7. "The Best Is Yet to Come" – 4:59
8. "Journey's End" – 3:13
9. "Girl with the Indigo Eyes" – 4:49
10. "Porscha" – 4:49

== Personnel ==
The Rippingtons

- Russ Freeman – keyboards, acoustic guitars (1, 2, 5, 6), electric guitars (1, 2, 5–7, 9), 12-string guitar (1, 2, 5), mandolin (2), bass (2–4, 9), guitars (3, 4, 10), rhythm programming (3, 4, 9), baritone guitar (5, 8), percussion (6, 8), classical guitar (8)
- Tom McMorran – acoustic piano solo (2, 7), additional keyboards (7) [uncredited in 6]
- Kim Stone – bass (1, 5–7, 9, 10)
- Tony Morales – drums (1, 2, 5–7, 9, 10)
- Steve Reid – percussion (1, 2, 5, 7, 10)
- Jeff Kashiwa – tenor saxophone (1, 10), EWI controller (1), alto saxophone (5, 10), soprano saxophone (8, 9)

Guest musicians and vocalists

- Art Wood – loops (3, 4, 9)
- Kirk Whalum – tenor saxophone (3, 4)
- Jeffrey Osborne – lead vocals (3)
- Bridgette Bryant – backing vocals (3, 4)
- Lynne Fiddmont – backing vocals (3, 4)
- Jim Gilstrap – backing vocals (3, 4)
- Phil Perry – backing vocals (3, 4), lead vocals (4)

Production

- Dave Grusin – executive producer
- Larry Rosen – executive producer
- Russ Freeman – producer, arrangements, recording, mixing
- John Potoker – recording (Jeffrey Osborne's vocal on Track 3)
- Carl Griffin – mixing
- Joseph Doughney – post-production
- Michael Landy – post-production
- The Review Room (New York City, New York) – post-production location
- Vlado Meller – mastering at Sony Music Studios (New York City, New York)
- Cara Bridgins – production coordinator
- Joseph Moore – production coordination assistant
- Sonny Mediana – production director
- Lillian Barbuti – production direction assistant
- Andi Howard – album coordination, management
- Andy Baltimore – creative director
- Alba Acevedo – art direction, inside illustration
- Hollis King – art direction
- Dan Serrano – art direction
- Laurie Goldman – graphic design
- Freddie Paloma – graphic design
- Bill Mayer – cover illustration
- Carl Studna – photography

== Charts ==
Chart (1994)	Peak position
US Billboard Jazz Albums	2
