= Steve Bailey =

American bassist

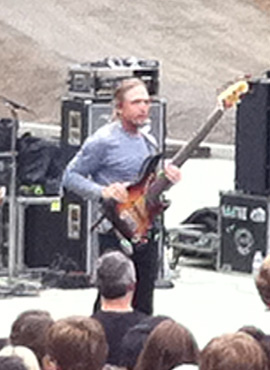
- Bailey performing at Stanford University

Background information
- Born: Myrtle Beach, South Carolina, U.S.
- Genre: Jazz
- Occupation: Musician
- Instruments: Bass guitar, double bass
- Years active: 1981–present
- Member of: Bass Extremes
- Website: stevebaileybass.com

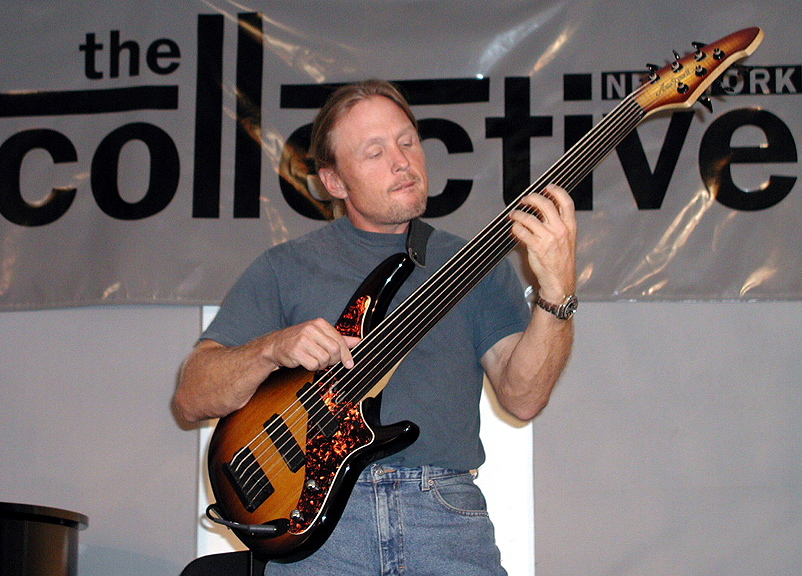
Steve Bailey performing at the New York Bass Collective

Steve Bailey is an American bassist. He is the chair of the bass department at Berklee College of Music.

== Career ==
Bailey began playing bass guitar at age 12 and started playing fretless bass after he ran over his fretted Stuart Spector with his car. He started playing double bass after hearing Stanley Clarke playing with Return to Forever. He has been a faculty member at Coastal Carolina University and the University of North Carolina Wilmington. He was also a faculty member at Hollywood's BIT for 10 years. He is a co-founder of Victor Wooten's Bass/Nature Camp, which helps to teach bassists of all ranges. Thebassvault.com is also a joint project by Bailey and Wooten.

Bailey has worked with Ernestine Anderson, Bass Extremes, David Benoit, Tab Benoit, Michel Camilo, Larry Carlton, Paquito D'Rivera, Chris Duarte, Bryan Duncan, Brandon Fields, Dave Liebman, Dizzy Gillespie, Scott Henderson, Carol Kaye, Kitaro, T Lavitz, James Moody, Mark Murphy, Willie Nelson, John Patitucci, Ray Price, Toni Price, Emily Remler, The Rippingtons, Claudio Roditi, Billy Joe Shaver, Billy Sheehan, Lynyrd Skynyrd, Mel Tormé, and Jethro Tull.

His latest Album, CAROLINA, is a collection of 17 duets (one track of bass and another person doing what they do) featuring 17 different guests including Willie Nelson, Ian Anderson, Ron Carter, Victor Wooten, Mike Stern, Becca Stevens, Dennis Chambers and much more.

Bailey has "authored" 3 different signature bass models.

- Aria AVBSB 1992-2002
- Fender SRB Jazz BASS 6 2008-2010
- Warwick Signature Steve Bailey models, 4, 5, & 6 string 2010–present

== Discography ==
=== As leader ===
- Dichotomy (Victor, 1991)
- Evolution (Victor, 1993)
- Bass Extremes "Cookbook" with Victor Wooten (Tone Center, 1995)
- Bass Extremes Vol. 2 with Victor Wooten (Tone Center, 1998)
- Bass Extremes Just Add Water with Victor Wooten (Tone Center, 2001)
- So Low...Solo (BATB, 2007)
- Carolina (Treehouse, 2020)
- Bass Extremes S'low Down (Vix, 2022)

=== As a member ===
The Rippingtons

- Tourist in Paradise (GRP, 1989)
- Welcome to St. James' Club (GRP, 1990)
- Curves Ahead (GRP, 1991)
- Weekend in Monaco (GRP, 1992)

=== As sideman ===
With David Benoit

- Inner Motion (GRP, 1990)
- Letter to Evan (GRP, 1992)
- Shaken Not Stirred (GRP, 1994)

With Tab Benoit

- Nice & Warm (Justice, 1992)
- What I Live For (Justice, 1994)

With Paquito D'Rivera

- Live at the Keystone Korner (Columbia, 1983) – live
- Taste of Paquito (Columbia, 1994) – compilation

With Steve Reid

- Bamboo Forest (Sugo, 1994)
- Water Sign (Telarc, 1996)

With Harry Sheppard

- This-a-Way That-a-Way (Justice, 1991)
- Points of View (Justice, 1992)

With Victor Wooten

- Yin-Yang (Compass, 1999)[2CD]
- Soul Circus (Vanguard, 2005)
- Palmystery (Heads Up International, 2008) – rec. 2004–2007
- Words and Tones (Vix, 2012)
- Sward and Stone (Vix, 2012)

With others

- Doug Cameron, Rendezvous (Higher Octave Music, 1996)
- Jesse Dayton, Raisin' Cain (Justice, 1995)
- Bryan Duncan, Strong Medicine (Modern Art, 1989)
- Russ Freeman, Holiday (GRP, 1995)
- Jeff Kashiwa, Remember Catalina (Fahrenheit, 1995)
- Kitaro, Dream (Geffen, 1992)
- Masi, Downtown Dreamers (Metal Blade, 1988)
- Roberto Perera, Erotica (Epic, 1990)
- Ray Price, Prisoncer of Love (Justice, 2000)
- Toni Price, Lowdown & Up (Antone's, 1999)
- David Rice, Released (Justice, 1994)
- Shaver, Highway of Life (Justice, 1996)
- Starfighters, In-Flight Movie (Jive, 1982)
- Jethro Tull, Roots to Branches (EMI, 1995)
- Robin Williamson, The Old Fangled Tone (Pig's Whisker Music, 1999)

== Books ==
- Advanced Rock Bass (1991)
- Five String Bass (1991)
- Fretless Bass
- Rock Bass (1991)
- Six String Bass (1991)
- Bass Extremes (1993) by Steve Bailey and Victor Wooten

== Videos ==
- Fretless Bass REH (1992)
- Bass Extremes: Live (1994)
- The Day Bass Players Took Over the World, Victor Wooten, Oteil Burbridge (2006)
- Warwick: Fuss on the Buss 1, featuring Larry Graham, Bootsy, TM Stevens, etc. (2009)
- Warwick: Fuss on the Buss II, featuring Bootsy, Robert Trujillo, Lee Sklar, Verdine White, etc. (2011)
- Warwick: Fuss on the Buss III, featuring Ralph Armstrong, Larry Graham, Jonas Hellborg, Ryan Martini, TM Stevens, etc. (2012)
