= The Rippingtons =

American jazz band

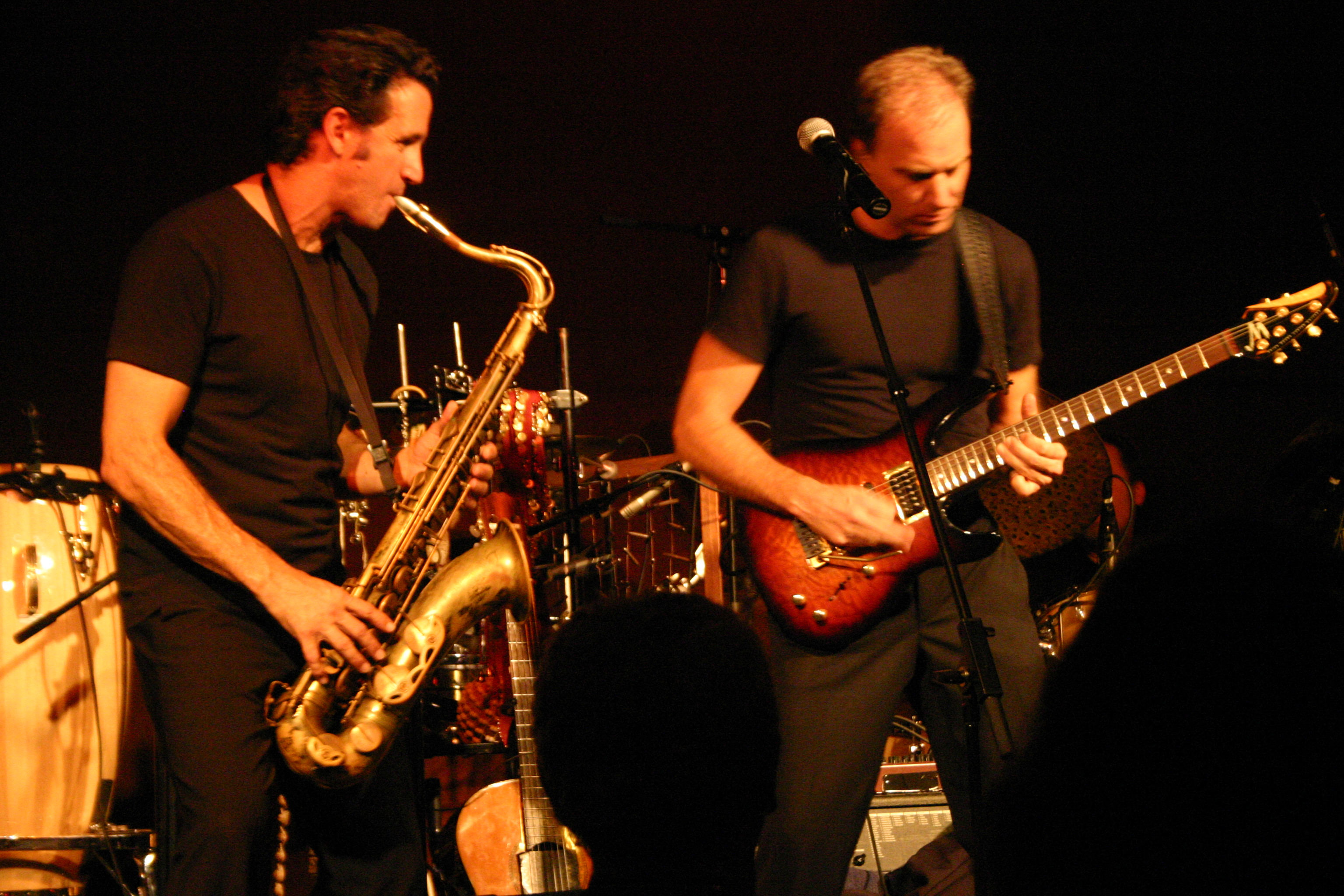
- Eric Marienthal and Russ Freeman playing live in 2007

Background information
- Origin: United States
- Genres: Smooth jazz, jazz fusion, jazz pop, crossover jazz
- Years active: 1985–2020
- Labels: GRP, Windham Hill, Peak, Concord
- Past members: Russ Freeman; Brandon Fields; Steve Reid †; Tony Morales †; Kenny G Bill Lanphier; Gregg Karukas; Jimmy Johnson; Rob Mullins; Steve Bailey; Mark Portmann; Jeff Kashiwa; Kim Stone; Tom McMorran; David Kochanski; David Anderson; Dave Hooper; Ramon Yslas; Paul Taylor; Eric Marienthal; Scott Breadman; Dave Karasony; Bill Heller; Rico Belled
- Website: www.rippingtons.com

The Rippingtons were an American contemporary jazz group, mainly relating to the genres smooth jazz, jazz fusion, jazz pop, and crossover jazz. Formed in 1985 by guitarist and band leader Russ Freeman, their career has spanned more than three decades. With a revolving door of musicians, Freeman has been the only consistent member.

Many of their songs have been featured in the "Local on the 8s" forecast segments on The Weather Channel. The band's mascot is a grinning, sunglasses-wearing jazz cat, which appears in the artwork of all the band's releases and on their official website.

== Current members ==
- Russ Freeman – guitar, keyboards and programming
- Dave Karasony – drums
- Bill Heller – piano
- Rico Belled – bass
- Brandon Fields – saxophone

Past members have included bassists Kim Stone, 1990–2008, Steve Bailey and Bill Lanphier; saxophone players Jeff Kashiwa, Paul Taylor, Eric Marienthal, Kenny G, Kirk Whalum, and Nelson Rangell; pianists/keyboard players Dave Kochanski, David Benoit, Gregg Karukas, Tom McMorran and Mark Portmann; drummers Tony Morales, David Anderson, Omar Hakim, and Dave Hooper; and percussionists Scott Breadman, Ray Yslas and Steve Reid.

== Music career ==
=== 1980s ===
The band name was conceived by Russ Freeman after hearing friends play "and they were ripping", so Freeman thought of Rippingtons for a name. Freeman had previously released his solo debut album Nocturnal Playground, which was released in April 1986 under the Brainchild Records label.

The band's recording career began in 1986 with the recording of the album Moonlighting. The album was well received by critics and consumers and featured the song "She Likes to Watch," which has gone on to become a staple of the band's live set and one of their signature tunes. In April 1988, the Rippingtons released Kilimanjaro and began to tour more extensively. Mark Portmann, Steve Bailey (replacing Bill Lanphier), and Jeff Kashiwa joined the band, the band then released Tourist in Paradise in May 1989. The tour for this album featured the group's first visit to Japan with David Benoit, where they joined the special summer concert series in Tokyo produced by Japanese saxophonist Sadao Watanabe.

=== 1990s ===
In August 1990, bassist Kim Stone joined the group replacing Steve Bailey; the album Welcome to the St. James' Club was released that month, and became the band's first CD to debut at #1 in the Billboard Charts.

In 1991, Russ Freeman relocated to Colorado and opened Cheyenne Mountain Ranch studios. The move influenced the group's next album, Curves Ahead, which was released in August, and featured songs based on Africa, Brazil, and the ski atmosphere in Colorado. Standouts include "Aspen" and the title track.

In August 1992, the group released Weekend in Monaco, which, to date, has been one of their best selling albums. After its release the group toured Europe for the first time in June 1993. The U.S. leg of the tour was documented on the album Live in L.A., with the video recorded live at The Ventura Theatre in Ventura, California on September 25, 1992, and the album recorded at The Greek Theatre in Los Angeles, California on September 26, 1992.

In 1994, Tom McMorran joined the band after Mark Portmann left, and in August of that year, the band released Sahara. The following tour featured extensive dates in East Asia, where the group played Tokyo, Osaka, Fukuoka (Japan), and Southeast Asia including Jakarta (Indonesia), Manila (Philippines) as well as Singapore and Guam.

In 1995, David Kochanski joined the group, and the group made its presence known on the Internet. February 1996 saw the release of Brave New World, which featured covers of "Ain't No Stoppin' Us Now," "While My Guitar Gently Weeps," and "Caravan of Love." The album was a stylistic departure for the band, and included more Urban Jazz than had appeared on previous releases. Tony Morales, the original drummer, left the band after this release to pursue a career in web management. Morales put together the Rippingtons' first web site, which was nominated for an AOL award (Best Jazz Band Site). He later became the webmaster and manager of Silicon Graphics International's web sites for 10 years, and now has his own hosting and development business tonyhosting.com.

In March 1997, the group released Black Diamond, their first record on Peak Records in conjunction with Windham Hill Records. The album debuted at #1 on Billboard. In 1999, Dave Hooper and Ramon Yslas joined the Rippingtons, and Jeff Kashiwa was replaced by Paul Taylor. In May 1999, the group released Topaz, which featured Native American flute work by Robert Tree Cody. Topaz remains one of the group's most requested CDs.

=== 2000s ===
In 2000, Russ Freeman relocated to South Florida, and the move was reflected thematically in Life in the Tropics. This was the group's first album to be recorded digitally. In 2001, Scott Breadman, Bill Heller, Dave Karasony, and jazz saxophonist Eric Marienthal joined the group, and the following tour was documented on the live album Live Across America. In 2003, the group released Let It Ripp, featuring the title cut, which became a hit.

In 2005, the group released Wild Card, which plays on their ongoing Latin influences. The album features guest vocal spots by Latin music stars Willy Chirino, Chante Moore, and Albita.

In 2006, the group celebrated their 20th anniversary by releasing 20th Anniversary, a two disc set which includes the main CD as well as a 20th Anniversary Retrospective DVD.

On March 10, 2009, the Rippingtons made a return to the contemporary jazz scene with the release of the album Modern Art. A new bassist, Ricardo "Rico" Belled, participated in the recording of this album. Modern Art was nominated for a Grammy in the category "Best Pop Instrumental Album."

In October 2009, the Rippingtons returned to Japan to perform four nights (eight gigs) at the Cotton Club in Tokyo. This was their first-time return to Japan in 18 years.

=== 2010s ===
In 2011, the Rippingtons took listeners to the French coast with the thematic album, Côte D'Azur. The album features French, Latin, Gypsy and Euro rhythms. Saxophonist Jeff Kashiwa is featured on the album (he returned for the second album in a row.)

The group released Built To Last on August 28, 2012, featuring Zakk Wylde, a full orchestra, and elements of jazz, rock, pop and country. This album was the first for the Rippingtons under its new partnership with E1 Music.

== Discography ==
=== Studio albums ===
Title	Album details	Peak chart positions			
Title	Album details	Top Contemporary Jazz Albums	US	Top Independent Albums	Top Jazz Albums
Moonlighting	Release date: 1986; Label: Alfa Moon (Japan) [under its subsidiary label The Baked Potato; initially released as Cruise Control Moon Riding], Passport Jazz [reissued by GRP in 1990]; Formats: CD, cassette, LP	5	50	-	25
Kilimanjaro	Release date: April 24, 1988; Label: GRP; Formats: CD, cassette, LP	3	110	-	-
Tourist in Paradise	Release date: May 15, 1989; Label: GRP; Formats: CD, cassette, LP	4	85	-	-
Welcome to the St. James' Club	Release date: August 21, 1990; Label: GRP; Formats: CD, cassette, DAT, LP	1	-	-	-
Curves Ahead	Release date: August 13, 1991; Label: GRP; Formats: CD, cassette, DCC, LP	1	148	-	-
Weekend in Monaco	Release date: August 18, 1992; Label: GRP; Formats: CD, cassette	2	147	-	-
Sahara	Release date: August 30, 1994; Label: GRP; Formats: CD, cassette	1	-	-	-
Brave New World	Release date: February 27, 1996; Label: GRP; Formats: CD, cassette	4	-	-	-
Black Diamond	Release date: March 24, 1997; Label: Peak; Formats: CD, cassette	1	147	-	-
Topaz	Release date: May 18, 1999; Label: Peak; Formats: CD, cassette	2	-	-	26
Life in the Tropics	Release date: October 10, 2000; Label: Peak; Formats: CD	4	-	29	-
Let It Ripp	Release date: May 6, 2003; Label: Peak; Formats: CD	6	-	15	-
Wild Card	Release date: May 17, 2005; Label: Peak; Formats: CD	4	-	-	4
20th Anniversary	Release date: July 25, 2006; Label: Peak; Formats: CD	3	-	-	3
Modern Art	Release date: March 10, 2009; Label: Peak; Formats: CD	4	-	-	4
Côte D'Azur	Release date: February 1, 2011; Label: Peak; Formats: CD	3	-	-	3
Built To Last	Release date: August 28, 2012; Label: eOne; Formats: CD	1	-	35	1
Fountain of Youth	Release date: June 10, 2014; Label: eOne; Formats: CD	3	-	-	3
True Stories	Release date: June 24, 2016; Label: eOne; Formats: CD	1	-	24	1
Open Road	Release date: March 22, 2019; Label: eOne; Formats: CD	-	-	-	-

=== Live albums ===
Title	Album details	Peak chart positions			
Title	Album details	Top Contemporary Jazz Albums	US	Top Independent Albums	Top Jazz Albums
Live in L.A.	Release date: 1992; Label: GRP; Formats: CD, cassette	6	-	-	-
Live Across America	Release date: March 12, 2002; Label: Peak; Formats: CD	11	-	-	-

=== Compilations ===
Title	Album details	Peak chart positions			
Title	Album details	Top Contemporary Jazz Albums	US	Top Independent Albums	Top Jazz Albums
The Best of The Rippingtons	Release date: November 11, 1997; Label: GRP; Formats: CD, cassette	10	-	-	-
