= Mark Portmann =

- Genres: Pop, jazz, classical
- Occupations: Musician, songwriter, arranger, record producer
- Instrument: Keyboards
- Formerly of: The Rippingtons
- Website: www.markportmann.net

Mark Portmann is a musician, songwriter, and record producer who has worked with Celine Dion and Josh Groban.

Portman began to learn classical piano as a child, but beginning at Coconut Creek High School he turned to pop music and jazz. He went to the Eastman School of Music on a scholarship, studying composition, and attended the University of Miami. In 1988, he became a keyboardist in the jazz group The Rippingtons and left the group four years later. In 1997, he released a solo album on Zebra Records titled No Truer Words.

Songs co-produced by Portmann were nominated for ASCAP Latin Music Awards in 2003 and 2010.
