= Nelson Rangell =

American jazz musician and composer

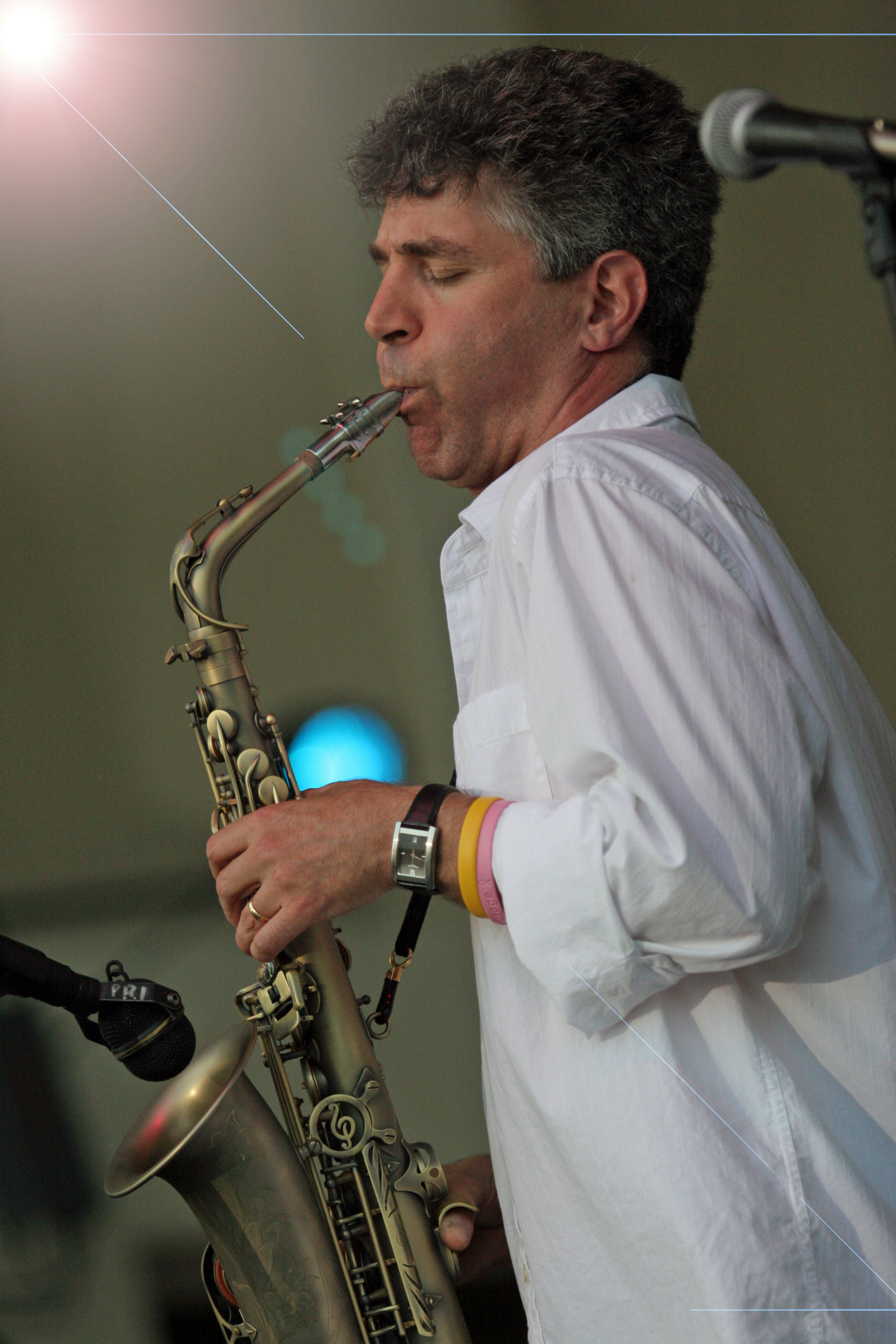

Background information
- Born: March 26, 1960 (age 66); Castle Rock, Colorado, U.S.
- Genre: Smooth jazz
- Occupation: Musician
- Instruments: Saxophone, flute
- Years active: 1988–present
- Labels: GRP, Shanachie
- Website: nelsonrangell.com

Nelson Rangell (born March 26, 1960) is an American smooth jazz musician and composer from Castle Rock, Colorado. Although he is known for his work with the tenor, alto, and soprano saxophone, his primary instrument is the piccolo, which he began playing at the age of 15. He has at times worked with Jimmy Haslip and Russ Ferrante.

== Career ==
Although Rangell's parents weren't musicians, his siblings have careers in music. His brother Andrew is a concert pianist and his brother Bobby is a woodwind player in Europe. His sister Paula is a singer in New Orleans, Louisiana.

Rangell first played flute at the age of 15. Within six months he was studying both jazz and classical music at the Interlochen Arts Academy, a camp for gifted music students. He attended the New England Conservatory of Music in Boston. As a student he won Best Jazz and Best Pop/Rock Instrumental Soloist in the Down Beat magazine National Student Recording Awards. Throughout his flute career, he also showed a talent in whistling, incorporating whistling into his flute playing.

After college he moved to New York City in 1984. During the next four years he worked as a sideman with Eric Marienthal, Hiram Bullock, Eric Gale, Richard Tee, Jaco Pastorius, David Sanborn, and the Gil Evans Monday Night Orchestra. He also worked on jingles for commercials. His debut album was released in 1987 by Gaia/Gramavision Records. Soon after, he was signed to GRP by Dave Grusin and Larry Rosen.

In the 1980s he was a member of Members Only, a jazz ensemble which recorded for Muse.

Beginning in 1989, he recorded eight albums for GRP. He has recorded with The Rippingtons, Chuck Loeb, Patti Austin, Tom Browne, the GRP All-Star Big Band and is featured on The Hang, an album by Don Grusin that was nominated for a Grammy Award. In the late 1990s he signed with Shanachie Records.

== Discography ==
- To Begin Again (1988)
- Playing for Keeps (1989)
- Nelson Rangell (1990)
- In Every Moment (1992)
- Truest Heart (1993)
- Yes, Then Yes (1994)
- Destiny (1995)
- Turning Night into Day (1997)
- Always (1999)
- Far Away Day (2000)
- Look Again (2003)
- All I Hope for Christmas (2004)
- My American Songbook Vol.1 (2005)
- Soul to Souls (2006)
- Red (2015)
- Blue (2015)
- By Light (2019)
