= Jeff Kashiwa =

American jazz saxophonist (born 1963)

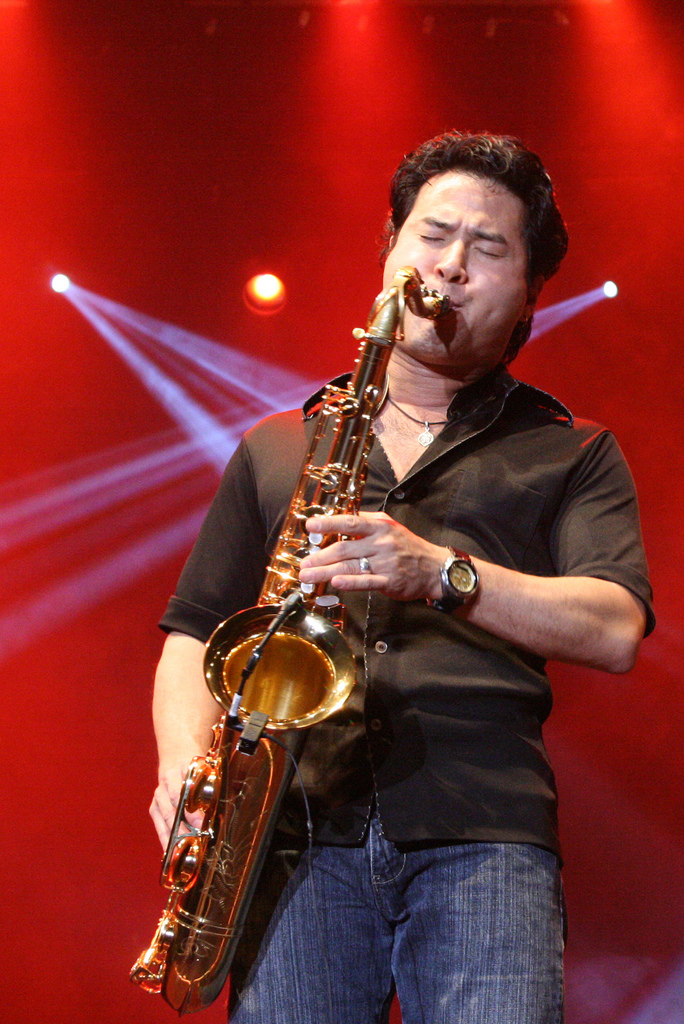
- Java Jazz Festival 2008

Background information
- Born: 1963 (age 62–63); Louisville, Kentucky, U.S.
- Genre: Jazz
- Occupation: Musician
- Instruments: Saxophone (primary); EWI; flute
- Label: Native Language
- Website: jeffkashiwa.com

Jeff Kashiwa is an American saxophonist with the smooth jazz band the Rippingtons and one of three with the Sax Pack, as well as having recorded several albums under his own name.

== Life and career ==
Jeff Kashiwa was born in 1963 in Louisville, Kentucky but moved to Seattle, Washington as a young child. He credits the public school's music program for inspiring his interest in music, along with his father, who died in 1992, who was a fan of jazz music including Benny Goodman and Glenn Miller. While attending school, his father gave him an old silver clarinet but, when he later saw a row of saxophones at school, Kashiwa knew he had found the instrument for him.

As a local gig musician working small jobs, Kashiwa wanted a more permanent position in a band and, after searching for some time without success, he approached bassist Steve Bailey of the Rippingtons, of whom he was a fan, and hired Bailey to play along with him. He eventually sought an audition for the Rippingtons, one of the genre's most successful bands, which led to him joining them following a festival concert and Brandon Fields' departure from the group. Prior to his audition, he prepared by learning every song in the group's library, making his eventual step into Field's large shoes seemingly effortless. Kashiwa recorded his first two solo albums, ("Remember Catalina" and "Walk A Mile"), during his tenure with the Rippingtons.

In 1999, though, he left the Rippingtons to concentrate on his own band, Coastal Access, which included Melvin Davis (Bass), Allen Hinds (Guitar), Dave Hooper (drums) and Dave Kochanski (Keyboards/Synths). Eric Marienthal and Paul Taylor both covered the sax player spot in the Rippingtons for a few years, but Kashiwa temporarily rejoined the band in 2007 for their 20th Anniversary Tour, and continues to record and perform with the group from time to time.

In 2004, Kashiwa got in touch with some of his saxophone peers to start a new group called the Sax Pack, led by three sax players, building on their collective musical passion for jazz, funk and R&B. "The Sax Pack" features Jeff Kashiwa, Steve Cole and Kim Waters. The Sax Pack released three CDs, "The Sax Pack" (2008), "The Pack is Back" (2009) and "Power of 3" (2015) on Shanachie Records.

Kashiwa not only plays soprano, alto and tenor saxophones, flute and the EWI (Electronic Wind Instrument) but also composes, produces and teaches.

He attended Berklee College of Music in 1981–83, where he developed an interest in straight-ahead jazz and, as a student, was picked as second alto chair by Disney's All American College Band. He eventually became an instructor. Kashiwa later transferred to Cal State Long Beach and received his Bachelor's degree in Music in 1985. He currently teaches Music Technology at Shoreline College, as well as private courses for students of all ages. Kashiwa has a wife, Chaunte, and a daughter, Catalina.

== Discography ==
=== As leader ===
- 1995 Remember Catalina
- 1997 Walk a Mile
- 2000 Another Door Opens
- 2002 Simple Truth
- 2004 Peace of Mind
- 2007 Play
- 2009 Back in the Day
- 2012 Let It Ride
- 2017 Fly Away
- 2021 Sunrise
- 2024 Luminoso

=== As a member of the Rippingtons ===
- 1990 Welcome to the St. James' Club
- 1991 Curves Ahead
- 1992 Weekend in Monaco
- 1994 Sahara
- 1996 Brave New World
- 1997 Black Diamond
- 2011 Côte D'Azur

=== As a member of the Sax Pack ===
- 2008 The Sax Pack - Steve Cole, Jeff Kashiwa, Kim Waters
- 2009 The Pack Is Back - Steve Cole, Jeff Kashiwa, Kim Waters
- 2015 Power of 3 - Steve Cole, Jeff Kashiwa, Kim Waters
