= Peak Records =

American record label

- Parent company: Concord Music Group
- Founded: 1994
- Founder: Russ Freeman, Andi Howard
- Distributor(s): Universal Music Group
- Genre: Jazz fusion
- Country of origin: U.S.

Peak Records is an American record label that was founded by The Rippingtons leader and guitarist Russ Freeman and Andi Howard in 1994.

== History ==
- 1994 Peak Records is co-founded by Russ Freeman and Andi Howard in GRP Records.
- 1997 Peak transferred to Windham Hill Records.
- 2000 Peak transferred to Concord Records.

Peak's first recording was Time Slipping By from Mark Williamson in 1994, and Sahara by Russ Freeman and the Rippingtons. During the late 1990s, Peak became a fully self-sufficient independent label under Windham Hill/RCA, and the Rippingtons' released Black Diamond to commemorate the then 10-year anniversary of the group.

When the label became part of Concord Records, Peak signed saxophonists Paul Taylor and Eric Marienthal, and Regina Belle to the label as well as vocalist Phil Perry. In 2001, Belle released This Is Regina!, which went gold and earned a Grammy Award nomination for Best Traditional Soul/R & B Vocal category.

Early on, the label put out the Rippingtons' second live recording called Live Across America in 2002, and an album from Gato Barbieri, called The Shadow Of The Cat. LaToya London released an album on Peak Records in September 2005 called Love & Life Others who have released material on the label include former Ambrosia vocalist David Pack and Denver-based contemporary jazz act Dotsero. In 2004, Lazy Afternoon from Regina Belle made No. 9 on the Billboard Smooth Jazz Chart.

In the middle of the decade, Howard and the label became aggressive in signing talent, bringing David Benoit in 2004, Lee Ritenour (2005), Gerald Albright (2006), Will Downing, Paul Brown, Norman Brown, Peabo Bryson and Marc Antoine (the last five all in 2007). In 2006, Peak released the Rippingtons' 20th Anniversary, which also included a commemorative 25-minute DVD. The CD included new songs including "Bingo Jingo," "City of Angels," "Costa Del Sol," and "Anything," which also featured singer-songwriter Brian McKnight. During 2007, Peak Records' artists Paul Brown and Norman Brown both peaked at No. 1 on the Smooth Jazz Chart from Radio & Records magazine. The label also released the debut album from Marc Antoine called Hi-Lo Split. In 2007, Peak Records released albums from Eric Marienthal (Just Around the Corner), Peabo Bryson (Missing You) and Will Downing (After Tonight).

In 2008, Jessy J released her debut recording on the label, Tequila Moon. In addition, saxophonist Mindi Abair signed to a recording contract and her debut, Stars, was released in May that year. Jeff Lorber's album Heard That was issued in September. Leigh Jones also signed to the label, during a ceremony in mid-March. In the latter stages of 2008, it was announced that Wayne Brady had joined Peak and released his debut, A Long Time Coming, on September 16. Peak also signed Peter White and All-4-One.

In 2011, Peak began a partnership with eOne Music.

== Notable current artists ==
- Gerald Albright
- All-4-One
- Marc Antoine
- Regina Belle
- David Benoit
- Wayne Brady
- Norman Brown
- Peabo Bryson
- Will Downing
- Russ Freeman
- Jessy J
- Jeff Lorber
- Eric Marienthal
- Chanté Moore
- Lee Ritenour
- Paul Taylor
- Peter White
- The Rippingtons

== See also ==
- List of record labels
