= Brandon Fields (musician) =

American musician

- Born: 1958 (age 67–68); Indiana, U.S.
- Genres: Jazz, Jazz fusion, pop
- Occupation: Musician
- Instruments: Saxophone, flute, clarinet
- Years active: 1976–present
- Labels: Nova, Positive Music, Paras
- Website: brandonfields.com

Brandon Fields (born 1958) is a saxophonist, flutist, and clarinetist from Indiana.

He has recorded with Alex Acuña, David Benoit, Stanley Clarke, Harry Connick Jr., Luis Conte, Terence Trent D'Arby, Neil Diamond, George Duke, David Garfield, Robben Ford, Al Jarreau, Elton John, Quincy Jones, Los Lobotomys (Steve Lukather, Simon Phillips & co), Neil Larsen, Michael McDonald, Bill Meyers, Robbie Nevil, Alphonse Mouzon, Ricky Peterson, Tom Petty, Lionel Richie, The Rippingtons, Tower of Power, Luther Vandross, Dave Weckl, Nancy Wilson and Phil Upchurch. He recorded also with Ray Charles, appearing on the posthumously-released album Genius Loves Company (2004).

Fields has also played on the movie soundtracks for Bull Durham (1988), Class Action (1991), Waiting to Exhale (1995), 2 Days in the Valley (1996), The Preacher's Wife (1996), and Austin Powers: The Spy Who Shagged Me (1999).

Fields has toured with George Benson (1985–86), The Rippingtons (1987–89 as a member), Tower of Power (early 1990s as a member), Earth Wind and Fire (1995), and with the Dave Weckl Band (1998–present).

== Discography ==
- The Other Side of the Story (Nova, 1986)
- The L.A. Jazz Quintet (ProJazz, 1986)
- The Traveler (Nova, 1988)
- Other Places (Nova, 1990)
- Everybody's Business (Nova, 1991)
- Brandon Fields (Positive Music, 1995)
- Higher Ground (Venus, 1997)
- Fields & Strings (Paras, 1999)
- One People (CD baby, 2009) - as Brandon Fields Trio
- Kiss Lonely Goodbye (Venus, 2011) - reissue of album Higher Ground under new name
