= Steve Reid (The Rippingtons) =

American percussionist (1955–2025)

- Born: November 14, 1955; Denver, Colorado, U.S.
- Died: September 24, 2025 (aged 69) Los Angeles, California, U.S.
- Genres: Jazz, New Age
- Occupation: Musician
- Instrument: Percussion
- Years active: 1970s–2025

Steve Reid (November 14, 1955 – September 24, 2025) was an American jazz percussionist and founding member of The Rippingtons. He played and recorded with The Rippingtons from 1985 to 1999. He also played with Supertramp in 1987–88, and worked frequently as a studio musician in the 1980s and 1990s, appearing on albums by Miles Davis, Dave Koz, Nelson Rangell, The Emotions, Frank Gambale, Stanley Jordan, and others. In 1993, 1995, and 1997 he was named Percussionist of the Year by Jazziz magazine.

== Discography ==
For recordings from 1986-1999 with The Rippingtons, see The Rippingtons.

=== As leader ===
- Bamboo Forest (Sugo, 1994)
- Water Sign (Telarc, 1996)
- Mysteries (Telarc, 1997)
- Passion In Paradise (DOMO, 1999)
- Dream Scapes (Eagle Music Group, 2001)

=== As sideman ===
- Miles Davis, Tutu (Warner Brothers, 1986)
- Supertramp, Free As A Bird (A&M, 1987)
- Supertramp, Live '88 (A&M, 1988)
- Dave Koz, Dave Koz (Capitol, 1990)
- Rob Mullins, Tokyo Nights (Nova, 1990)
- T-Square, Natural (CBS/Sony, Epic (U.S.), 1990)
- T-Square, New-S (CBS/Sony, 1991)
- Nelson Rangell, In Every Moment (GRP, 1992)
- Richard Smith, From My Window (Brainchild, 1994)
