= Java Jazz Festival =

Largest annual jazz event in Indonesia

Jakarta International Java Jazz Festival (JJF) is one of the largest jazz festivals in Asia. Held in Jakarta, Indonesia, it is arguably the biggest in the Southern Hemisphere. The festival has been held every May since 2021; previously, it was held every March.

The event has had some notable locations. From 2005 to 2009, it was held at Jakarta Convention Center, Senayan. From 2010 to 2025, it was held at Jakarta International Expo, Kemayoran. From 2026 onwards, Java Jazz Festival takes place at Nusantara International Convention Exhibition, PIK 2.

It was held for the first time in 2005, when approximately 125 groups and 1,405 artists performed in 146 shows. The first festival was attended by 47,500 visitors during its three-day stretch. The festival, which is also known simply as Java Jazz, was founded by Indonesian businessman Peter F. Gontha.

== Editions ==
=== 2005 ===
Date: March 5–7, 2005
Venue: Jakarta Convention Center, Senayan
Theme: "Bringing the World to Indonesia"
Number of visitors: ± 35.000
Number of stages: 11

==== International artists lineup ====
- Amp Fiddler
- Angie Stone
- Chiara Civello
- Deodato
- DJ IZO
- DJ Maestro
- Eric Benet
- Galaxy Jazz Big Band (Japan)
- Gilles Peterson
- Jeff Kashiwa
- Jeff Lorber
- Laura Fygi
- Lizz Wright
- Michael Paulo
- Michelle Nicolle
- Saskia Laroo
- Steve Reid
- Tania Maria
- Tetsuo Sakurai
- Tiempo Libre
- Vinny Valentino

==== Special show ====
- Earth, Wind & Fire Experience (featuring Al McKay's L.A. All Stars)
- George Duke
- Incognito
- James Brown

==== Indonesian artists lineup ====
- Adjierao & Jendela Ide Kids Percussion
- AGNEZ MO
- Aksan Sjuman Quartet
- Andien
- Bali Lounge & Gita Wiryawan
- Bayu Wirawan Trio
- Bertha & Friends
- Bintang Indrianto & Sujiwo Tejo
- Bubi Chen
- Canizzaro feat. Mus Mujiono
- Cherokee
- Chlorophyll
- CO-P
- D'Band
- DJ Glenn
- Donny Suhendra
- Dwanka Band
- Elfa's Bossa's
- Elfa's Children Choir
- Elfa's Jazz & Pop
- Farabi Percussion Ensemble
- Funky Thumb
- Trisum (featuring Dewa Budjana, Tohpati, I Wayan Balawan)
- Glenn Fredly
- Heaven on Earth
- Humania
- Iga Mawarni
- Indra Lesmana Reborn
- Janapria/ Sanjaya/ Sjuman
- Jaque Mate
- Jazzyphonic
- Krakatau
- KSP
- Kul-Kul
- Ligro Trio
- Maliq & D'Essentials
- Marcell
- Margie Segers feat. Idang Rasjidi & Friends
- Maulana Brothers feat. Jackie
- Melting Pod Soundsystem
- Nera
- New Breeze
- No Name
- Otti Jamalus Quartet
- Padi
- Paragita UI Choir
- Pentatones feat. Benny Likumahuwa
- Rieka Roeslan
- Ruth Sahanaya
- Saharadja feat. Rio & Sally
- Salta
- Shakila
- Simak Dialog
- Sova
- Stereo Soul
- Sue & Friends
- Syaharani & The Queenfireworks (ESQI:EF)
- T-Five
- Tamam Hoesein & Friends with Nina Warna
- Ten 2 Five
- The Groove
- The Romero's
- TJNDD International Quartet
- Zefa

=== 2006 ===
Date: March 4–6, 2006
Venue: Jakarta Convention Center, Senayan
Theme: "Bringing the World to Indonesia"
Number of visitors: ± 40.000
Number of stages: 15

==== International artists lineup ====
- Ad Colen Quartet
- Adani & Wolf Group
- Asianergy feat. Jack Lee
- Bob James
- Bob James and Angels of Shanghai
- Bob James Quintet
- Chiara Civello
- Dave McMurray
- Daniel Martina
- Daniel Sahuleka
- Daniela Schachter
- Dave Koz and Vinny Valentino (feat. Indonesian Idol)
- Dave Koz and Rendezvous All Stars feat. Jonathan Butler
- Dennis Rollins Badbone & Co
- Doug Cameron & Friends
- Eric Benet
- Gerald Albright
- Harri Stojka
- Hiromi
- Incognito
- Jack Lee
- Jeff Lorber and Gerald Albright
- Kirk Whalum
- Lewis Pragasam
- Lee Ritenour
- Luis Giraldo
- Mark de Clive-Lowe
- Masada
- Mezzoforte
- Michael Lington & Magenta Orchestra (feat Jeff Lorber and Eric Benet)
- Michael Paulo
- Negroni's Trio
- Nathan East
- Noryn Aziz
- Peter White & Michael Paolo Band
- Raphael Gualazzi Trio
- Relax
- Rendezvous All Star feat Jonathan Butler
- Wayman Tisdale
- Rick Braun
- Tetsuo Sakurai
- Tortured Soul
- Tots Tolentino
- Vikter Duplaix
- Vinny Valentino
- Youn Sun Nah

==== Special show ====
- Brand New Heavies
- Patti Austin (feat. Twilite Orchestra)
- Tower of Power
- Take 6
- Omar and Carleen Anderson (feat. Incognito)
- Kool & the Gang

==== Indonesian artists lineup ====
- 4 Peniti
- Adjierao Percussion Ensemble
- Aksan Sjuman Quartet
- Anda Bunga
- Andi Wiriantono
- Ape on the Roof
- Balawan & Batuan Ethnic
- Bali Lounge
- Bandung All Stars - Imam Pras, Benny Likumahua & Jazz Connection
- Benny Mustapha (Battle of the Drums)
- Blue Savana
- Blues Brothers Experience "Time Warp"
- Bobb Quartet
- British International School
- Bubi Chen with Bob Tutupoly (special guest)
- CDB
- Cronik (turntablist)
- Deviana
- Discus feat. Fadly (Padi) & Andien
- Doddie Latuharhary & Edy Timisela
- Dwiki Dharmawan Project feat. Rafly
- Ecoutez
- Elfa Secioria feat. E Voices
- Elfa Secioria feat. Elfa's Singer & Elfa's bosas
- Ello
- Endah Widiastuti & 426 UPH Bigband
- Farabi Percussion Ensemble
- Gadiz & Bass
- Galaxy Jazz Big Band - (Japan)
- Gilang Ramadhan feat. Nera
- Glenn Fredly
- Guitar Extravaganza (Kiboud M, Lee R, Vinny V, Jack Lee, Balawan, Dion, Nanda)
- Harvey Malaihollo & Shakila feat. Magenta Lounge
- Hyper Sax & CO
- Idang Rasjidi & Syndicate
- Imam Pras Quartet
- Indonesian Idol (Mike, Yudika, Monita, Nania, Lucky)
- Indonesian Soul feat. Humania special guests Marcell, Glenn & Andien
- Indra Lesmana Reborn Guest Star Lenny Castro
- Gerald Albright
- Ireng Maulana & Friends
- Jakarta International School
- Japoz (Arief Setiadi & Joel)
- Jaque Mate
- Kahitna
- Kelasik
- Kiboud Maulana Blues Band
- Kilimanjarao
- Kirana Big Band
- Ligro Trio
- Luluk Purwanto Quartet
- Maliq & D'Essentials
- Marcell
- Margie Segers
- Maya Hasan & Soul Mate
- Mocca
- Moluccan Nite: Glen Fredly, Ruth Sahanaya, Harvey Malaiholo, Shakila, Mike etc.
- Nial Djuliarso
- Nina Tamam And Friends feat. Tamam Hoesein Band
- Oele Patiselano, a tribute to Perry Pattiselano
- OpusTre directed by Ricky Lionardi
- Otti Jamalus
- Park Drive
- Quita
- Rafi Drums
- Rieke Roeslan
- Rio Moreno Trio
- Ruth Sahanaya feat. Ad Colen Quartet
- Saharadja
- Shakila
- Shanou
- Simak Dialog
- SORE
- Sova
- Tangga
- The Forte Band: A tribute night to Bill Saragih
- TIKA
- Tomorrow People Ensemble
- Tompi feat. Groovology
- Tribute to John Pattirane feat. Opustre Big Band, Bob Tutupoly, Ruth Sahanaya, Andre Hehanusa, Shakilla, Margie Segers, Harvey Malaiholo, Lita Zen, Olive, Iwan Zen, Edo Kondologit, MD:Ricky Lionardi, Glenn
- Tuti & Friends (Jogja)
- Viky Sianipar
- White Shoes & Couples Company
- Wong Pitoe
- Yeppi Romero & Andi Bayou
- Zarro
- Zefa (11th) & uncles

=== 2007 ===
Date: March 2–4, 2007
Venue: Jakarta Convention Center, Senayan
Theme: "Bringing the World Together"
Number of visitors: ± 40.000
Number of stages: 15

==== International artists lineup ====
- 5-Essence feat. John Hondorp
- Adam Klipple
- Airto Moreira & Flora Purim
- Austin Peralta
- Black Diamonds
- Bobby Hutcherson
- Brian Simpson
- Daughters of Soul feat. Lalah Hathaway
- Dave Douglas
- Indira Khan
- Dave Weckl
- David Benoit
- Deniece Williams
- Diane Schuur
- Djanecy
- Eldar
- Eric Legnini Trio
- Eric Marienthal
- Frank McComb
- Freddie Washington
- Gino Vannelli
- Harvey Mason
- The Hipstones
- Jan Wessels
- Jeff Lorber
- Jeffrey Osborne
- John Scofield
- Jorge Diaz
- Kenny Rankin
- Kiki Ebsen
- Kimiko Itoh
- Koji Goto
- Kyle Eastwood
- Larry Franco
- Level 42
- Lica Cecato
- Lisa Ono
- Marcus Miller
- Maurice Rugebregt "Sioh Maluku"
- Michael Paulo
- Nona Hendryx
- Omar Sosa
- Reel People
- Richard Bona
- Rick Braun
- Ron Carter
- Sadao Watanabe
- Sam McNally
- SFJAZZ Collective ft. *Joshua Redman
- Shapes
- Steve Thornton
- Tony Monaco
- Tortured Soul
- Vikter Duplaix
- Yosuke Onuma

==== Special show ====
- Chaka Khan
- Jamie Cullum
- Sérgio Mendes

==== Indonesian artists lineup ====
- "Brothers Of Revolution" feat Indra Lesmana
- Humania
- Glen Fredly
- Mike
- Mc Vandal
- Acoustic Encounter feat:Ireng & Kiboud Maulana, Kadek, Nanda, Viktor R, Oele P, Adjierao
- Unlimited Percussion
- Aldrin
- Andi Wiriantono
- Arief Setiadi & Friend's
- Bad Boys Blues
- Balawan Trio
- Bambang Nugroho
- Barry Likumahuwa Project
- BazzAttack
- Beben Jazz feat. Carolina
- Benny Likumahuwa & The Young Connection
- Benny Mustafa and Young All Stars
- Bobb Quartet
- Bubi Chen
- Canzo
- Chill n' Play
- Cindy
- Devian
- Dian PP
- Special Project
- DJ Ebi
- DJ Glenn
- Dwiki Dharmawan World Peace Project
- Ecoutez
- Elfa's Singers, Elfa's Bossas with Elfa's Big Band
- Emerald
- Endah & Rheza
- g.d.e
- Galaxi Big Band
- Geliga
- Glen Dauna Jazz Quintet
- Harry Toledo
- HyperSax N Co feat. Saunine
- Idang Rasjidi & The Syndicate
- Iga Mawarni & Heaven on Earth
- Imam Fathur
- Indonesian Voice of Soul (Ello, Rio F, Mike, Lucky, Pasto)
- Indra Aziz
- Ivonne Atmodjo
- Jazzy Phonic
- Jakarta Drums School Rhythm Nation
- Jilly And Her Banda Brama
- Jopie Item & Friends Feat. Rien Djamain
- Trie Utami
- Kelasik
- Kirana Big Band Jogjakarta
- Krakatau
- The Journey Of.M.Director:Irvan Chasmala feat. Andien
- Olive
- Rieka Roslan
- Ruth Sahanaya
- Loopin Loop
- Maliq & D'Essentials
- Marcel
- Melly
- Michelle Efferin Quartet
- Moskvitch
- Oele Pattiselano Project feat. 3G
- Park Drive
- Pasto
- Pineapple
- Rieka Roslan
- Rien Djamain
- Ruth Sahanaya
- Ryan
- Shanty
- Six Element
- Soul Id
- Soul Vibe
- Starlite
- Syaharani
- Syaharani & Queen Fireworks
- The Journey Of Krakatau
- The Professors
- The S Scade PCBnB
- Tiga Mawarnih
- Titi DJ
- Tompi & Groovology
- Viky Sianipar
- Vivo
- Warrior of Manga
- Zarro
- Zinnia
- 4 on 6 Quintet
- Apple Program Application For Music feat. Riza Arshad
- Dimi
- EQ Humania Project
- Jaque Mate
- Kahitna
- Karimata
- Tribute To Barry Likumahuwa feat. Andien, Cindy, Dira, Ello, Mike Mohede, Pasto
- Rio Febrian
- Tya Subiakto Orchestra
- 4 AM Quartet
- Ello
- Erwin Gutawa
- Jakarta Intl School Big Band
- Kulkul
- La Belle
- Quicky
- Storytellers

=== 2008 ===
Date: March 7–9, 2008
Venue: Jakarta Convention Center, Senayan
Theme: "Taste the Spirit of Jazz"
Number of visitors: ± 45.000
Number of stages: 19

==== International artists lineup ====
- Atilia
- Attwenger
- Brian Simpson
- Chico & the Gypsies
- Coda (Australia)
- Crusaders (feat. Randy Crawford)
- D'Sound
- Dhafer Youssef
- Duo - Gabriel Grossi e Daniel Santiago
- Dwiki Dharmawan's 'World Peace Project' feat. Walfredo Reyes, Jr.
- R. Burn
- Tollak Ollestad
- S. Thornton
- Earth, Wind & Fire Experience (featuring Al McKay's L.A. All Stars)
- Eric Darius
- Everette Harp
- Franco D'Andrea Quartet
- Gary Anthony
- George Clinton 'Funkadelic'
- Greg Adams
- Gregg Karukas
- Harvey Mason
- Incognito
- Jammin Zeb
- Jane Project
- Jeff Kashiwa
- Jeff Lorber
- Jeff Lorber Band (feat. Eric Darius)
- Jody Watley
- Joe Sample & The Crusaders (feat. Steve Gadd)
- Julien Wilson Trio
- Katalyst (Australia)
- Kazumi Watanabe
- Kristin Berardi and The Band (feat. Mike Nock Trio)
- Kurt Elling
- Lee Ritenour (with Patrice Rushen, William Kennedy, Kurt Elling)
- Lee Ritenour (with Patrice Rushen)
- Lenny Castro
- Logic
- Marc Antoine
- Marlene Del Rosario (Philippines)
- Maysa Leak
- Megan Bowman
- Melvin Davis
- Michael Paulo
- Michiel Borstlap `Eldorado` (Netherlands)
- Mike Nock Trio
- Najee
- Omar Sosa
- Raul Midon
- Ray Parker Jr.
- Renee Olstead
- Ron King Big Band
- Sara Gazarek
- Sizhukong (Taiwan)
- Steve Oliver & Humberto Velas
- Terumasa Hino
- Tetsuo Sakurai
- The Harvey Mason Trio (with Pat Martino & Tony Monaco)
- The High Five Quintet (Italy)
- Tineke Postma
- Tony Monaco
- Triba
- West Coast All Stars (feat. Greg Adams, Jeff Kashiwa, Gregg Karukas)

==== Special show ====
- James Ingram
- Bobby Caldwell
- Babyface
- The Manhattan Transfer

==== Indonesian artists lineup ====
- 21st Night
- 4 Peniti (DB)
- 4AM Quartet
- 5 Wanita - Rieka Roeslan, Yuni Shara, Iga Mawarni, Nina Tamam, Andien
- Abdul
- Aditya
- Adrian Adioetomo (DB)
- Afgan
- Alfred Young Sugiri
- Andezzz [departure:people]
- Andy Gomez
- Ari (Groovology)
- Arti Dewi (DB)
- Asiabeat
- Audy
- Avenue
- Bad Boyz Blues
- Bali Lounge
- Bambang Nugroho Octagon
- Barry Likumahuwa
- Benny Likumahuwa & the Salamander Big Band
- Benny Mustafa van Diest
- Bibus
- Bop Vivant
- Canizzaro
- Canzo feat. Sherly O
- Cindy Bernadette
- Contra Indigo
- Crave
- Desty
- Devian
- Deviana
- Dewi Sandra
- Dian Pramana Poetra
- Dimi
- Ecoutez
- Eki Puradiredja
- Endah N Rhesa
- Ermy Kullit
- Fakta
- Friends
- Galaxy Big Band
- Gihon Lohanda Trio
- Glen Dauna Project
- Glenn Fredly
- Gorga
- Gugun & The Blues Bug
- Hyper Sax,
- Idang Rasjidi
- Imel Rosalin Trio
- Ireng Maulana
- ITMOS (Indonesia-Germany-US)
- Iwan Wiradz & Tri Budiman feat. Elfa Secioria
- J-Flow (DB)
- Jakarta Broadway Singer & IMDI Ensemble
- Jakarta Drums School
- JassKiddin'
- Jazz Perhaps & Flava
- Jazzmatic
- Jazzmint Big Band
- Jeffrey Tahalele
- Jimmy
- Jopie Item
- Karinding Collaborative Project
- Kinanti Project
- Kirana Big Band
- La Belle
- Laconieck
- Lenggie
- Ligro Trio
- Michelle Effirin Quartet
- Mike Mohede
- Mr. Lazy
- Nial Djuliarso
- Nikki Manuputty
- Notturno
- Oele Pattiselano
- Oleo, Orbeat (DB)
- Palm From The Moody Tunes
- Parkdrive
- Pasto
- Phinisi (Makasar)
- Prambors Jazz Band
- Pro Rejected
- R&B Band
- Radhini & Renita
- RAN
- Rio Moreno
- Ryan
- Saharadja
- Santa Monica (DB)
- Sekapur Sirih
- Shinta & Jubing
- Sister Duke
- Sketsa
- Sol Project
- Souleh & Soulehah
- Soulvibe
- Starlite
- Suddenly September
- Surabaya All Star
- Syaharani and The Queenfireworks
- Tao Kombo
- The Cats
- The Doctors
- The New Konservativ
- Tiga Mawarnih
- Tika (DB)
- Tiwi Shakuhachi
- Tri Sum
- Two Triple O
- Vassagie
- Velvet Band
- Whisper Not
- Yance Manusama

=== 2009 ===
Date: March 6–8, 2009
Venue: Jakarta Convention Center, Senayan
Theme: "It's a Festival for All"
Number of visitors: ± 70.000
Number of stages: 19

==== International artists lineup ====
- Alex Ligertwood
- Antonio Pontarelli
- Chuck Loeb
- Dave Valentin
- Dhruv
- Dwight Sills
- Eliane Elias
- Eric Darius
- Everette Harp
- Gamelan Shockbreaker
- Gary Anthony
- Harvey Mason Quartet
- Isao Suzuki
- John Stoddart
- Karizma (feat. David Garfield)
- Ledisi
- Mike Stern (feat. Dave Weckl)
- Mitch Forman
- Moon Arra (India)
- New York Voices & Ron King Big Band
- Oleta Adams
- Parov Stelar (Austria)
- Pascoal Meirelles
- Peabo Bryson
- Prasanna
- Purple Circle
- Quasimode (Japan)
- Rex Rideout
- Roy Ayers
- Royce Campbell "Tribute To Wes Montgomery" (feat. Tonny Monaco, Oele Pattiselano & Cendy Luntungan)
- Sensuàl
- Simon Phillips
- Soil & "Pimp" Sessions
- Stefano Bollani
- Steve Ferrone
- Student Loan
- The Gospel According to Jazz
- Thermal and a Quarter
- Toku
- Tom Scott & Paulette McWilliams
- Veronica Nunn

==== Special show ====
- Brian McKnight
- Dianne Reeves
- Jason Mraz
- Laura Fygi
- Matt Bianco
- Swing Out Sister

==== Indonesian artists lineup ====
- 21st Night
- Abdul & The Coffee Theory feat. David Naif
- Aditya
- Afgan
- Aksan Sjuman
- Andy Gomez
- Anggun
- Ariss
- Bambang Nugroho Stright Ahead
- Benny Likumahuwa Jazz Connection & 5 Bones
- Benny Mustafa Van Diest feat. Nial Djuliarso & Indro
- Canizzaro
- Cindy Bernadette
- Contra Indigo
- D'Cinnamons
- Drew
- Dwiki Dharmawan Global Harmony Orchestra
- Ecoutez
- Elfas Scecoria feat. Elfa's Singers
- Emerald
- Endah N Rhesa
- Glenn Fredly Tribute to Chrisye
- Humania
- Jamie Aditya
- Jazmint Big Band
- Jflow
- Joeniar Arief & Lala Suwages
- Joppie Item & Friends
- LALA
- Malaka Ensemble feat. Hendry Lamiri Band
- Maliq 'n D'Essentials feat. The Organic's All Stars
- Manna
- New Breeze
- Nicky Manuputty
- Nial Djuliarso
- Noor Bersaudara
- Oele Pattiselano
- Orbeat Project
- Pa Tua (Stefan Thiele)
- Phinisi
- Pitoelas Big Band
- Ran
- Riza Arsyad Proje Ct/ Simak Dialog
- Salamander Big Band feat. Margie Segers
- Sierra
- Slank
- Souleh & Souleha
- Soulvibe
- Surabaya All Star
- Tohpati
- Tompi
- Tropical Transit
- Toba Rumba feat. Yeppy Romero
- Vidi Aldiano
- Yance Manusama feat Funk Section

=== 2010 ===
Date: March 5–7, 2010
Venue: Jakarta International Expo, Kemayoran
Theme: "Jazzin' Up Remarkable Indonesia"
Number of visitors: ± 60.000
Number of stages: 22

==== International artists lineup ====
- Adonis Puentes
- Alexandra Sherling
- Allen Hinds
- Arturo O'Farrill
- Bill Evans
- Bob James
- Breakestra
- Brian Lynch "Unsung Heroes"
- Brian Simpson
- Chieli Minucci
- Christian McBride and Inside Straight
- Darryl Jones
- David Murray Black Saint Quartet
- Dedication (feat. Alexandra Sherling, Valeri Grohovski's Jazz Trio, Hermitage)
- Due Voci: (Diane Warren's Greatest Hits)
- Direct from Las Vegas: The Rat Pack (with Ron King Big Band)
- Dr. Roberto Aymes (Mexico)
- Emilio Santiago
- Eric Benet (with Ron King Big Band)
- Griffith Frank
- Harvey Mason
- HDV Trio (with David Helbock) (Austria)
- Hendrik Meurkens Samba Jazz Quartet
- Hubert Laws
- Ivan Lins
- Jane Monheit
- Jazzanova Live! (feat. Paul Randolph)
- Jessy J
- Karen Briggs
- Karsh Kale & MIDIval Punditz
- Kurt Rosenwinkel Guitar Clinic
- Lao Tizer
- Lee Ritenour
- Maurice "Mobetta" Brown
- Melvin Davis
- Michael Paulo
- Mindi Abair
- Nathan Haines
- Novello B3
- Randy Brecker
- Robben Ford
- Rodney Holmes
- Ron Bruner Jr.
- Ron King Big Band
- Roy Hargrove Quintet
- RTM Orchestra (Malaysia)
- Rufus (feat. Sly Stone)
- Sax Divas
- The Sax Pack (Jeff Kashiwa, Steve Cole, Kim Waters)
- Sheila Majid
- Soulbop: Special Edition
- Special EFX
- State of Monc
- Steve Lukather
- The Johnny Thompson Singers
- Tony Monaco
- Wet Floor

==== Special show ====
- Babyface
- John Legend
- The Manhattan Transfer (with Ron King Big Band)
- The Manhattan Transfer: The Chick Corea Songbook
- Toni Braxton

==== Indonesian artists lineup ====
- /rif Special Project feat. Toni Monaco, State of Monc Horn & DJ Cream
- 21st Night
- Aditya feat. Aminoto K, Andi Rianto, Adrian, Kyriz
- Anda with the Joints
- Andezz
- Andra & the backbone acoustic feat. Ari Lasso
- Andre Harihandoyo & Sonic People
- Andre Hehanusa
- Angel Percussion
- BAG Trio
- Batak Sensation
- Beatbop Jazz Project
- Benny Mustafa Quartet feat. Indra Lesmana, Yance Manusama, Nikita Dompas
- Chlorophyl
- Coklat
- Contra Indigo
- Eclairs
- Ecoutez
- Endah 'n Rhesa
- Gugun Blues Shelter
- Idang Rasjidi Special Funk Project
- Imela Kei
- Indra Aryadi
- Jakarta Broadway Singers
- Jakarta Broadway Team
- JavaJazz feat. Indra L., Gilang R., Matez, Donny S., Dewa Budjana
- Lala Suwages
- Leonardo
- Major Seventh
- Maya Hasan Sound of Light feat. Fariz RM, John P, Adi D, Sandy W, Iwan H, Michael
- Notturno feat. Chroma String Quartet
- Opustre Soul Big Band feat. Lea Simanjuntak
- Papayafil
- Quartet Punakawan feat. Jaya Suprana
- Rafi & The Beat with Soul Generation feat. Soulmate, Rudlof, Davina, Bona Pascal, Radhini Aprilia
- Sol Project
- SUB 4
- Surabaya All Star
- Tika N The Dissidents
- Titi Sjuman Folk Jazz Project
- Tropical Transit (Bali)
- Yeppy Romero & Harry Toledo
- Yovie Widianto Fusion
- Yuri Mahatma

=== 2011 ===
Date: March 4–6, 2011
Venue: Jakarta International Expo, Kemayoran
Theme: "Harmony Under One Nation in Remarkable Indonesia"
Number of visitors: ± 110.000
Number of stages: 18

==== International artists lineup ====
- Abraham Laboriel
- Acoustic Alchemy
- Bauchklang
- Bob James
- Bobby Lyle
- Brian Culbertson
- Brian Simpson
- Chuck Loeb
- Corinne Bailey Rae
- Daniel Amat
- Danjil
- Eastmania (feat. Kai Eckhardt)
- Ed Motta
- Eric Darius
- Everette Harp and Bobby Lyle - Acoustic Show
- Fareed Haque
- Fourplay
- George Duke All Stars
- Harvey Mason
- Hendrik Meurkens
- Jamie Lidell
- Jeff Lorber
- Joey DeFrancesco Trio
- Jose James
- Juan de Marcos González & Afro Cuban All Stars
- Kilimanjaro
- Los Amigos
- Luca Ciarla Quartet
- Maurice "Mobetta" Brown
- Michael Paulo
- Nathan East
- New York Voices
- Rasmus Faber & RaFa Orchestra
- Rhoda Scott
- Robert Glasper Experiment
- Roberta Gambarini
- Ron King Big Band
- Roy Hargrove Quintet
- Ruben Hein
- Sondre Lerche
- Sr. Mandril
- Steve Smith & Vital Information (feat. Vinny Valentino)
- The Nairobi Trio (featuring Jonas Julio)
- Tony Monaco
- Zap Mama

==== Special show ====
- George Benson
- Santana

==== Indonesian artists lineup ====
- Abdul and The Coffee Theory
- Ade & Brothers
- Aditya
- Andien : The B-Sides
- Barry Likumahuwa Project
- Benny Likumahuwa & Young Jazz Connection
- Benny Mustafa
- Bonita & The Husband
- Bubi Chen Plays Pop
- C-Man
- Calvin Jeremy
- Chairul Umam Quintet
- David Manuhutu
- Dira Sugandi
- Donny Suhendra
- Drew
- Dwiki Dharmawan & Angklung Jazz Ensemble
- Elfa Secioria and His Legacy Lives On.. (feat. Elfa's Singers, Titi DJ, Elfa's Jazz Youth, Hedy Yunus, Yovie Widianto)
- Ello
- Endah N Rhesa
- Syaharani & The Queenfireworks (ESQI:EF)
- Fariz RM (feat. Barry Likumahuwa & Friend)
- Erwin Gutawa Big Band
- Farrah Di Bigband
- Four On The Floor
- Fraya
- Gigi and Ron King Big Band
- Glen Dauna (feat. Farrah Di)
- Glenn Fredly
- Husbands and Wives (Otti Jamalus, Yance Manusama & Endah N Rhesa)
- Idang Rasjidi
- Imam Pras Quartet
- Indonesia NuProgressive - Tribute to Harry Roesli
- Indonesian Youth Regeneration
- Indra Aryadi
- Indra Aziz Experiment
- Indro Hardjodikoro
- Iwan Abdie
- Iwan Hasan & Andien
- Enggar + Mery CHAMBER JAZZ
- J.O.C feat. J.O.C. Voices & Iwan Wiraz
- Java Jive
- Jopie Item
- Kahitna
- Kirana Big Band
- LLW (Indra Lesmana, Barry Likumahuwa, Sandy Winarta)
- Maliq & D'Essentials
- Manna Band
- Marcell
- Mian Tiara & D'Organics
- Minangapentagong Sawahlunto
- Nial Djuliarso: The Jazz Soul of Ismail Marzuki
- Nikita Dompas & His Fellow Musicians
- Nita Aartsen feat. Michael Paulo
- Notturno feat. The Soundscape
- Oele Pattiselano
- Pandji Pragiwaksono
- Pitoelas Bigband
- Raisa
- RAN
- Sandhy Sondoro
- Sandy Winarta Quartet
- Shadow Puppet Quartet
- Simak Dialog
- Sketsa
- Soulvibe
- Spero
- The Groove
- The Jongens Jazz Quartet
- The Police Project by Margo Rising
- The Profesors
- Tohpati Bertiga.
- Young Boys
- Zarro

=== 2012 ===
Date: March 2–4, 2012
Venue: Jakarta International Expo, Kemayoran
Theme: "Where Jazz Finds a Home"
Number of visitors: ± 123.000
Number of stages: 18

==== International artists lineup ====
- Barry White Show & The Pleasure Unlimited Orchestra
- Bobby Caldwell
- Bobby McFerrin
- Brian Simpson
- Bruce Hamada
- Carl Allen
- Chante Moore
- Chris Standring
- Dave Koz
- David Garfield & friends (Freddie Washington, Walfredo Reyes, Jr., Alex Ligterwood ft. Gerald Albright)
- David Sanborn
- Depapepe
- Dolf de Vries Trio (ft. Madeline Bell)
- Duwende
- D'Sound
- Franck Amsallem
- Frank McComb
- Gary Anthony & Ron King Big Band
- George Duke Trio
- Gerald Albright
- Hector Infanzon (Mexico)
- Jeff Lorber
- Jeff Pescatto
- Joey DeFrancesco
- Juilliard Jazz Quartet
- Laura Fygi
- Mamas Gun
- Maurice "Mobetta" Brown
- Mayer Hawthorne & The County
- Medeski Martin & Wood
- Nils Wogram Nostalgia
- Phil Perry
- Poncho Sanchez Latin Jazz Band
- Quincy Jones presents : Alfredo Rodriguez Trio
- Robert Randolph and the Family Band
- Ron Carter
- Ron King Big Band
- Sheila E. presents The E Family
- Soil and "Pimp" Sessions
- Swing Out Sister
- Taylor McFerrin
- The Manhattan Transfer
- Tony Monaco
- Triba
- Trijntje Oosterhuis
- Yoshinobu Hara

==== Special show ====
- Al Jarreau & George Duke Trio
- Erykah Badu
- Herbie Hancock
- Pat Metheny
- Stevie Wonder

==== Indonesian artists lineup ====
- Abdul and the Coffee Theory
- Aboda
- Ade & Brothers
- Andi Wiriantono Quartet & the Next Generation
- Andi Wiriantono Quintet
- Andien
- Andre Harihandoyo and Sonic people
- Ari Pramundito
- Atmosfera
- Balawan Bifan Duo
- Bambang Nugroho Straight Ahead + Cindy Bernadette
- Barry Likumahuwa Project feat. Ricky Lionardi Big band
- Benny Likumahuwa Like Father Like Son
- Benyamin on Jazz - Tribute to the Legend
- Bob Tutupoly Tribute to Bing Slamet & Sam Saimun feat. Titiek Puspa & Grace Simon
- Boby Limijaya 8 Horns Band
- Calvin Jeremy
- Chaseiro
- Cindy Bernadette
- Creamy Sugar Groove
- Devian Band
- Deviana und Freunde
- Dewa Budjana
- Dira Sugandi
- Donny Koeswinarno Quartet
- Donny Suhendra Project feat. Trie Utami
- Drew
- Dwiki Dharmawan & Sa'unine String Quartet
- Emerald BEX
- Endah & Rhesa
- Fanny Kuncoro Organ Quartet
- Farah Di
- Four on the Floor
- Funky Thumb feat. Najwa
- G-Pluck Beatles Gallery
- Galaxy Big Band
- Glen Dauna Project
- Godbless
- Gugun Blues Shelter
- Heaven on Earth
- HIVI
- Idang Rasjidi
- Imela Kei
- IMI Band
- In Memoriam of Bubi Chen
- Indonesia Nu Progressive
- Indonesian Youth Regeneration
- Indra Aziz Beat Bop Project
- Indra Lesmana - LLW feat. Maurice Brown
- Indrawan Tjhin Group
- Indro Hardjodikoro - The Fingers
- Jemima
- JOC feat. Bale Jazz Community
- Jopie Item Band with His Son
- Jozz Felix
- Kirana Big Band
- KLA Project
- Kosakata
- Kotak feat. Nabrassban
- KSP
- Lala Karmela
- Le Smokes Section's
- Living Colors
- Maliq & D'Essentials
- Manna
- Margo Rising Stars
- Matthew Sayersz & Tohpati
- Monita Tahalea Quartet
- Music Clinic
- Nicky Manuputty
- Nino
- Notturno
- Oele Pattiselanno
- Paquita
- Phylosophy ABG
- Project Bebas - Irianti & Friends
- Radhini
- Raisa
- Rendezvous by Rieka Roslan
- Rio Sidik Quintet
- Sandy Canester
- Sandy Winarta Quartet
- Senar 3
- Shadow Puppets feat. Nesia Ardi
- Sierra Soetedjo
- Simak Dialog
- Sister Duke
- Sketsa
- Smart Reborn
- Soulfull Corp
- Soulvibe
- Speakeasy
- Sri Hanuraga Trio
- Sruti Respati
- Stereocase
- Streamline Quartet
- Sujiwo Tejo
- Syaharani & QueenfireWorks
- Tembang Pribumi
- The Jongens Quartet
- The Journalists
- The Professors
- The Urban Gentlemen
- Tohpati Ethnomission
- Tomorrow People Ensemble
- Tribute to Herbie Hancock
- Tribute To Utha Likumahuwa
- Trio Lestari (Glen Fredly, Sandhy Sondoro, Tompi)
- Trio Scapes
- Trisum
- Twilite Orchestra
- Urban Phat
- VNS
- WRQ

=== 2013 ===
Date: March 1–3, 2013
Venue: Jakarta International Expo, Kemayoran
Theme: "Jazz Up the World"
Number of visitors: ± 115.000
Number of stages: 17

==== International artists lineup ====
- Balance and The Traveling Sounds
- Bob James
- Brian Simpson
- Butterscotch
- Chucho Valdes
- Chuck Loeb
- David Helbock
- Eldar Djangirov
- Emily Elbert
- Fernandez4
- Fourplay
- George Duke & Stanley Clarke
- Kaori Kobayashi
- James Carter Organ Trio
- Jimmy Cliff
- Jose James
- Magnus Lindgren (with Gregory Porter)
- Marcus Miller
- Mellow Motif
- Miles Smiles (feat. Larry Coryell, Joey DeFrancesco, Omar Hakim, Daryll Jones, Rick Margitza)
- New York Voices
- Phil Perry
- Roberta Gambarini
- Roy Hargrove Quintet
- Roy Hargrove RH Factor
- Spyro Gyra
- The Kenny Garrett Quintet
- The Soul Rebels
- Wouter Hamel

==== Special show ====
- Basia
- Joss Stone
- Lisa Stansfield
- Craig David

==== Indonesian artists lineup ====
- 4 Dekade - Oddie Agam & Friends with Twilite Orchestra
- Abdul and The Coffee Theory
- Aboda
- Ade & Brothers
- Aiko
- Aimee Saras Goes Swing
- Aksan Sjuman Glimpse
- Amanda and Friends
- Amboina
- Andezzz
- Andi Wiriantono & Friends
- Andien
- Anji
- B.D.G
- B3
- Balawan Bifan Trio feat Didiet Violin
- Bandanaira
- Barry Likumahuwa Project (BLP) Tribute to Weather Report
- Be3
- Benny Likumahuwa Jazz Connection
- Benny Mustafa feat. Rene Van Helsdigen
- Bonita & The Husband
- BubuGiri
- Calvin Jeremy
- Cindy Bernadette
- D'Masiv Jazz Project
- Dewa Budjana
- Dewi Sandra
- Donny Koeswinarno Quintet
- Donny Suhendra Power-Fusion Trio
- Dwiki Dharmawan and String Quartet
- Edelweiss
- Erik Sondhy Trio ( Karma)
- Eva Celia
- Flamenco Jazz Yeppy Romero & Nita Aartsen
- For Better Life Movement 57kustik
- G-Pluck Beatles
- Galaxy Jazz Big Band
- Ginda and The White Flowers
- Glen Dauna - Jimi Hendrix Experience
- Glenn Fredly
- HajarBleh Big Band Archived June 3, 2016, at the Wayback Machine
- Heaven On Earth
- Highnotes
- Idang Rasjidi meets Oele Pattiselanno
- IMI Band
- Indonesia Youth Regeneration
- Indra Lesmana-LLW feat Maurice Brown
- Indro Hardjodikoro The Fingers feat. dr. Tompi
- Ipang
- Iwan Hasan & Andien, Enggar + Mery Chamber Jazz
- Jhagad And Nusaha
- Karim Suweileh & Jazzy Quintet
- Kayon
- Klasika Kompas Workshop
- Krishna Balagita
- Ligro Trio
- Luka, Cinta & Merdeka - Glenn Fredly & Bakuucakar
- Maliq & D'essentials "Sriwedari"
- Manna
- Margo Rising Stars
- Matthew Sayersz
- Maya Hasan Classic Goes Jazz
- Mery Kasiman Project ft. Aksan Sjuman, Riza Arshad
- Milkiway
- Mr. Sonjaya
- Next Project
- Nino
- Oele Pattiselanno Septet
- Out Of Ordinary
- PD Tracks
- Philomena Singers
- Rafly Wasaja
- Raisa
- RAN
- Revo Marty
- Ritem Pertiwi
- Sandy Winarta Quartet
- Sarita Fraya
- Shadow Puppets - Septet
- Shadu Rasjidi
- Shakila
- Sister Duke
- Soul Bridge
- Soul Music System
- Space System
- Speakeasy
- Storia
- Suave
- Suddenly September
- Sweet Mouztache
- Tembang Pribumi
- The Collaboration
- The Crickets
- The ExtraLarge
- The Groove feat. Monday Michiru
- The Jongens Quartet
- The Soul Makers
- Three Song
- Tjut Nyak Deviana Daudsjah feat. Dip'ah
- Tohpati Bertiga
- Tompi
- Tribute To Elfa Secioria Feat Netta, Monita, Jemima, Yassovi
- Tribute To Ismail Marzuki Feat. Ghea Idol & Dendy Mike's
- Tribute To Utha Likumahuwa Feat Dinni Budiayu & Jamaica Cafe
- Tulus
- Ultras Quartet
- VNS
- Vriidom (Bale Jazz)
- Yassovi

=== 2014 ===
Date: February 28–March 2, 2014
Venue: Jakarta International Expo, Kemayoran
Theme: "Bringing the World to Indonesia"

==== International artists lineup ====
- Bella Kalolo
- Bob James
- Brazilian Connection
- Brian Simpson
- Chuck Loeb
- Cristina Morrison
- Dave Koz
- Djavan
- Dirty Loops
- Dutch Indo All Stars
- Earth, Wind & Fire Experience (featuring Al McKay's L.A. All Stars)
- Everette Harp
- Fourplay
- Gerald Albright
- Harvey Mason
- India Arie
- Incognito
- Ivan Lins
- James Taylor Quartet
- Jeff Lorber
- Joe Lima
- Joe Sabia
- Jonathan Butler
- Joyce
- Keiko Matsui
- Leny Andrade
- Magnus Lindgren
- Marcello Lessa
- Masse Sant Anan
- Maurice Brown
- Michael McDonald
- Mindi Abair
- Natalie Cole
- Nathan East
- Nils Petter Molvær
- Norman Brown
- Richard Elliot
- Rick Braun
- Robert Glasper
- Roberthino
- Ron King Big Band
- Sadao Watanabe
- Schroeder-Headz
- Snarky Puppy
- Soren Bebe
- Tania Maria
- Timo Lassy
- Toni Barretto
- Tony Monaco
- Vincent Ingala & Gregg Karukas

==== Special show ====
- Allen Stone
- Natalie Cole
- Jamie Cullum
- India Arie

==== Indonesian artists lineup ====
- 5 Wanita
- Adhitia Sofyan
- Afgan feat Vina Panduwinata
- Agnez Mo
- Andi Wiriantono Free Standarts Jazz Funk & Swing
- Art Of Tree
- Balawan
- Be3
- Benny Mustafa
- Bintang Indrianto
- Bubugiri
- Darkbark Dimension
- Devian and the Jazz Intersection
- Dewa Budjana
- Dian Pramana Poetra & Twilite Orchestra
- Diops
- Dira Sugandi feat Ron King Big Band
- Donny Koeswinarno Quart Electric
- Drew
- Dwiki Dharmawan & Friends
- Elfa's Bossas
- Endah N Rhesa Extended
- Esqi.EF
- Farah di Band feat Lana Nitibaskara
- Gadiz and Bazz
- Galaxy Bigband
- Gilang Ramadhan With Adi Darmawan & Ivan Nestorman
- Glen Dauna Project:Chat With Toots Feat Indra Dauna & Rega Dauna ( Harmonica )
- Gugun Blues Shelter
- HajarBleh Big Band
- Idang Rasjidi United Kingdom Rhythm
- Ina Ladies
- Indro Hardjodikoro - The Fingers
- Ivan Handojo
- J.O.C - PFG
- Jamie Aditya
- Jazzmint
- Jeffrey Tahalele
- Joey Alexander Trio
- Joy Tobing
- Karim Suweileh & The Jazzy Quintet
- Krystal Tahalele
- Latasha
- Like Father like Son Tribute to Indonesian Jazz Legends
- Liwu Rayie
- Maliq & D'Essentials
- Manna Band
- Marcell with Ricky Lionardi Bigband
- Monita Tahalea
- Musikimia
- Nial Djuliarso
- Oele Pattiselanno
- P-Project Bigband
- Radhini
- Raisa
- RAN
- Rio Moreno Latin Combo
- Robert MR Quartet
- Sandy Winarta Trio
- Sanur Jazz Project feat Damez Nababan
- Sentimental Moods
- Shadow Puppets feat Mike Mohede
- Sierra Soetedjo Tribute to Bubi Chen
- Sketsa
- Sound of Soul Project
- Storia
- Suave
- Taman Suropati Chamber
- Tembang Pribumi
- Teza Sumendra
- The Jongens
- The Newlans
- Tohpati
- Tomorrow People Ensemble
- Trans Brothers Band
- Tulus
- Tuslah
- Valera - Aartsen - Romero
- YK Samarinda
- YMI
- Yuri Jo

=== 2015 ===
Date: March 6–8, 2015
Venue: Jakarta International Expo, Kemayoran

==== Lineup ====
- Jessie J
- Christina Perri
- Chris Botti
- Bobby McFerrin
- Snarky Puppy
- Lisa Ono
- Kenny Lattimore
- Kahitna
- Naturally 7
- Tulus
- Sheila on 7
- Meshell Ndegeocello
- Reza Artamevia
- Ramsey Lewis
- Richard Bona
- Harvey Mason
- Mehliana (Brad Mehldau & Mark Guiliana)
- Alain Caron
- Chaka Khan featuring Incognito
- Matajiwa

and many more

=== 2016 ===
Date: March 4–6, 2016
Venue: Jakarta International Expo, Kemayoran

==== Lineup ====
- David Foster
- Chris Botti featuring Sting
- Robin Thicke
- Kurt Elling
- Tokyo Ska Paradise Orchestra
- Seun Kuti & Egypt 80
- Orquesta Buena Vista Social Club
- Relish
- Level 42
- Candy Dulfer
- Larry Coryell & David Garfield
- Patti Austin
- Hiatus Kaiyote
- Till Brönner
- Boney James
- BadBadNotGood
- Afgan
- Barasuara
- Marcell
- Glenn Fredly
- Raisa
- Isyana Sarasvati
- Michelle Walker
- Mocca
- Kunto Aji
- Teza Sumendra
- Yura Yunita
- Sore
- Tomorrow People Ensemble
- Endah & Rhesa with Dialog Dini Hari
- Maliq & D'Essentials
- Rida Sita Dewi
- Indro Hardjodikoro & Friends

and many more

=== 2017 ===
Date: March 3–5, 2017
Venue: Jakarta International Expo, Kemayoran

==== Lineup ====
- Elliott Yamin
- Incognito
- Ne-Yo
- Sergio Mendes
- Naughty by Nature
- Mezzoforte
- Nik West
- Bebel Gilberto
- Tulus
- Andien
- Afgan
- The Chick Corea Elektric Band
- HajarBleh Big Band (Special Guest Monita Tahalea)
- Arturo Sandoval
- Anthony Strong
- Wojtek Pilichowski
- The Lao Tizer Band
- Renegade Brass Band
- Michael Martyniuk Quartet
- Nicholas Payton Afro
- Dira Sugandi
- Lea Simanjuntak
- Cristina Morrison
- Blood Sweat Tears
- and many more

=== 2018 ===
Date: March 2–4, 2018
Venue: Jakarta International Expo, Kemayoran

Theme: Jazz In Diversity

Special Show: Daniel Caesar, Lauv, Goo Goo Dolls

==== Friday, March 2 ====
===== International artists lineup =====
- Bernhoft and The Fashion Bruises
- BJ the Chicago Kid
- Chris Walker
- Danish Radio Big Band
- Dionne Warwick
- DW3
- Elan Trotman
- Gorden Campbell
- Harvey Mason
- Ivan Lins
- Jeff Lorber
- Kennedy Administration
- Kevin Randolph
- Lee Ritenour
- Marlon McClain
- Mateus Asato with Rafi Muhammad Trio
- Matthew Whitaker Trio
- Maya Azucena
- Maysa Leak and The Brian Simpson Band
- Michael Manson
- New York Voices
- Papana Jazz Ensemble
- Paul Jackson Jr.
- Pianist Marvio Ciribelli and Brazilian Samba-Jazz Group
- Ron King Big Band
- The Commodores Experience feat. Thomas McClary
- Vanessa Williams

===== Indonesian artists lineup =====
- A Fine Tuning Creation
- Adrian Adioetomo
- Aksan Sjuman Trio
- Bass G
- BJ Dixieland
- Classmate Journal
- Dira Sugandi
- Dwiki Dharmawan & Friends Feat.Trisouls and Rahmania Astrini
- Elek Yo Band with Endah N Rhesa
- Endah N Rhesa
- Glenn Fredly
- HajarBleh Big Band (Special Guests Endah N Rhesa & Teddy Adhitya)
- Indro Harjodikoro
- Kunto Aji
- Lara
- Mery Kasiman
- MLDJAZZPROJECT Season 2
- NonaRia
- Papua Original
- Tesla Manaf
- The Intersection
- The Soulful Feat. Amelia Ong & Imela Kei
- Tomorrow People Ensemble

==== Saturday, March 3 ====
===== International artists lineup =====
- Avery*Sunshine
- Bernhoft and The Fashion Bruises
- Chris Walker
- Curtis Stigers
- Daniel Caesar
- Danish Radio Big Band
- DW3
- Elan Trotman
- Gorden Campbell
- Ivan Lins
- Jeff Lorber
- Kevin Randolph
- Marlon McClain
- Matthew Whitaker Trio
- Maya Azucena
- Maysa Leak and The Brian Simpson Band
- Michael Manson
- Neighbors Complain
- New York Voices
- Pianist Marvio Ciribelli and Brazilian Samba-Jazz Group
- Ron King Big Band
- The Commodores Experience ft. Thomas McClary
- Tony Monaco

===== Indonesian artists lineup =====
- 70S OC
- Candra Darusman Feat. Monita Tahalea, Teddy Adhitya, Danilla, Mondo Gascaro, Adikara Fardy, Nina Tamam, with Special Appearance from Chaisero and Karimata Trio
- Devian Zikri
- Dewa Budjana
- Endah N Rhesa
- Fourtwnty
- Hiroaki Kato
- JAKARTA BLUES FACTORY
- Java Jive X Fariz RM
- JAZ
- Jordy Waelauruw
- MLDJAZZPROJECT Feat. Marcel, Pusakata Danila, Syaharani
- MLDJAZZPROJECT Season 1
- Musicater - Cerita Fatmawati
- Nayra Dharma
- Petra Sihombing
- Syaharani and Queenfireworks
- Tashoora
- The Daunas
- Yamaha Music Project (Glenn Fredly, Andra Ramadhan, Tompi, Sandhy Sondoro, Kafin Sulthan)
- Yura Yunita
- ZIO

==== Sunday, March 4 ====
===== International artists lineup =====
- Avery*Sunshine
- BJ the Chicago Kid
- Danish Radio Big Band
- DW3
- Goo Goo Dolls
- Incognito
- Jhené Aiko
- Kennedy Administration
- Larry Carlton
- Lauv
- Maysa Leak and The Brian Simpson Band
- Neighbors Complain
- Pianist Marvio Ciribelli and Brazilian Samba-Jazz Group
- The Urban Renewal Project

===== Indonesian artists lineup =====
- Adhitia Sofyan
- Adikara Fardy
- Agam Hamzah & Arini Kumara
- Andien
- ANDRE Harihandoyo
- Cakrawala
- Deredia
- Ècoutez
- Fariz RM
- Gerald Situmorang Dimensions
- Gugun Blues Shelter with Tony Monaco
- Idang Rasjidi
- Indro Harjodikoro
- Iramamama
- Iwa K X Neurotic
- Maliq & D'Essentials
- Margie Segers Motown
- MLDJAZZPROJECT Feat. Marcel, Pusakata Danila, Syaharani
- MLDJUSTWANTED JUST ONE
- Mondo Gascaro
- Pusakata
- Rega Dauna Project
- Rendy Pandugo
- Saxx in The City
- Sheila and The Upmost
- Teddy Adhitya
- The Diplomats
- The Rollies
- Tohpati

=== 2019 ===
- Date: March 1–3, 2019
- Venue: Jakarta International Expo, Kemayoran

Special Show: TOTO, H.E.R, Raveena

Line-up

- Ade Avery
- Afgan
- Allen Hinds & L.A. Super Soul
- Andien
- Ardhito Pramono
- Barry Likumahuwa Tribute to Roy Hargrove
- Bob James Trio
- Cyrus Chestnut Trio
- The Daunas
- Delia
- Donny McCaslin
- Elfa Zulham & The Beatz Messenger
- Endah N Rhesa Extended
- The Funky Knuckles
- GoGo Penguin
- Gretchen Parlato
- Hanin Dhiya
- H.E.R.
- Idang Rasjidi & The Syndicate
- Indra Aziz For Good
- Indro Hardjodikoro
- Isyana Sarasvati
- James Vickery
- Jeff Bernat
- Jeslla
- JMSN
- John Beasley's MONK'estra
- Kneebody
- Knower
- Kunto Aji
- Louis Cole
- Lucky Chops
- Mac Ayres
- Masego
- Michal Martyniuk
- MLDJazzProject
- Moonchild
- Nathan East: Band of Brothers
- Nick Zavior
- Nima Ilayla
- Parkdrive
- Peter White
- R + R = NOW
- Radhini
- Raveena
- Rendy Pandugo
- Ron King Big Band
- Saxx in the City
- Sinéad Harnett
- Sony Music Project featuring Jaz, Ardhito Pramono & Rendy Pandugo
- Teddy Adhitya
- The Soul Rebels
- The Soulful
- The Suffers
- Tommy Pratomo
- Tony Monaco Trio
- Toto
- Warner Music Project featuring Andini, Hanin Dhiya, Rahmania Astrini & Trisouls
- Yura Yunita
- Yuri Mahatma
- ZAD
- Zsolt Botos

=== 2020 ===
- Date: February 28 – March 1, 2020
- Venue: Jakarta International Expo, Kemayoran

Avrist Hall
Friday: Elfa Zulham Project, Prep, Ron King Big Band, Mateus Asato
Saturday: T-Square, Yura Yunita, Jeff Lorber Fusion Trio, Rini
Sunday: Yuka Tamada & Trio Wijaya, Mike Stern & Jeff Lorber Fusion Trio, Pamungkas, Ezra Collective

Be One Hall
Friday: Michael White, Maurice Brown, Michael Paulo & Gregg Karukas & Melissa Manchester
Saturday: ABBA Revival by Maya Hasan, Michael Paulo & Gregg Karukas & Melissa Manchester, Harvey Mason
Sunday: Zad, Jay Som, Brian Simpson & Jackiem Joyner, Young Gun Silver Fox

BNI Hall
Friday: Nusantero Big Band, Chrisye Live by Erwin Gutawa, Reza Artamevia
Saturday: Ardhito Pramono & Ron King Horn Section, Yuni Shara Jazz Project, The Jacksons
Sunday: 7 Bintang, BNI Music Project, Omar Apollo, Tulus

Brava Radio Hall by MRA Media
Friday: The Daunas, Tony Monaco & Friends, Christian Sands Trio, Gerald Situmorang & Sri Hanuraga "Meta"
Saturday: Mondo Gascaro & Rien Djamain, Idang Rasjidi Syndicate, Otti Jamalus & Yance Manusama, Asian Jazz All Stars
Sunday: Nita Aartsen Quintet, New York Voices, Tony Monaco & Friends, Sri Hanuraga Trio

Demajors Stage
Friday: Anov Blues One, Chiki Fawzi, Kabar Burung, 5 Petani, Beatluz Music Collective
Saturday: Skastra, The Melodrama, Alsa Project, Bubugiri, Amboro
Sunday: Shandya, Made Mawut, Adhitia Sofyan, Metta Legita, MRNMRS, D'Name Acoustic Project

Java Jazz Stage
Friday: Lalahuta, Anomalie, Keziah Jones, Marcell
Saturday: Lakateu Lian, Jay Som, Young Gun Silver Fox, Brass Against
Sunday: United States Air Force Band of the Pacific, Cosmo's Midnight, Humania, The Steve McQueens

Kementerian Pariwisata dan Ekonomi Kreatif Stage
Friday: Yongky Vincent, Ade Avery, Paulinho Garcia, Cantika, Oslo Ibrahim
Saturday: Faye Risakotta, Rebecca Reijman, Good Morning Everyone, Andezzz (Departure People)
Sunday: The Mighties, KRLY, Indro Hardjodikoro Project, Tommy Ivan & Uap Widya, Balawan Batuan Ethnic Fusion

MLD Spot Hall
Friday: Likumahuwa Jazz Connection, T-Square, The Free Nationals, Rini
Saturday: Andmesh, MLDJazzProject S4, Jaz, Prep
Sunday: Nania, Church (Mark de Clive-Lowe & Harvey Mason), MLDJazzProject All Stars, Brass Against

MLD Spot Stage Bus
Friday: The Good People, Bass G, Mawar de Jongh, Efek Rumah Kaca
Saturday: Dreikids, Barry Likumahuwa, Saxx in the City, Maliq & D'Essentials
Sunday: Tashoora, Tuan Tigabelas, Sal Priadi, Reality Club

Teh Botol Sosro Hall
Friday: Rizky Febian, Bruno Major, Phil Perry, Isyana Sarasvati
Saturday: Nusantero Big Band, New York Voices, Bruno Major, Kiana Ledé
Sunday: Janapati (Dewa Budjana & Tohpati), Phil Perry, Yamaha Music Project

Top Coffee Hall
Friday: Jopie Item & Friends, Jamie Aditya & Ron King Big Band, Marion Jola, Cory Henry & The Funk Apostles
Saturday: Paulinho Garcia & Elfa's Singers, Anomalie, Brian Simpson & Jackiem Joyner, Mateus Asato
Sunday: Benny Mustafa N Jongens & Margie Segers, Dwiki Dharmawan & Nadin Amizah, Ron King Big Band, Fariz RM Anthology

=== 2021 ===
Not held due to the COVID-19 pandemic

=== 2022 ===
The 2022 festival was held May 27 through 29 at the Jakarta International Expo, Kemayoran, North Jakarta. The special show included JoJo, PJ Morton and The Temptations Rev. featuring Glenn Leonard.

=== 2023 ===
The 2023 festival was held on June 2–4 at the Jakarta International Expo, Kemayoran, North Jakarta. The festival included several special shows, including performances by Stephen Sanchez, The Chicago Experience featuring Danny Seraphine and Jeff Coffey, Cory Wong, and Max.

=== 2024 ===
Java Jazz Festival 2024 was the 19th anniversary edition of the annual Java Jazz Festival, held in JIExpo, Jakarta, Indonesia. The festival took place from May 24th to 26th 2024.

Special Show: Laufey, Snoh Aalegra

=== 2025 ===
The event marked the 20th anniversary of the iconic music festival, held from May 30th to June 1st, 2025 at JIExpo, Jakarta, Indonesia. The festival had 11 stages and over 1,000 musicians, and featured Jacob Collier, Tunde Baiyewu (voice of British pop soul duo Lighthouse Family) and Raye as Special Shows.

=== 2026 ===
The 2026 festival was held on 29–31 May 2026. It marked a change in venue from JIExpo to Nusantara International Convention Exhibition (NICE), located at PIK 2 in Tangerang Regency, Banten.

Ticket sales began on 1 November 2025 through the festival's official website. Special performances were given by Jon Batiste on 29 May, Wave to Earth and Ella Mai on 30 May, and Daniel Caesar on 31 May. The festival also featured the return of several artists who had previously performed at Java Jazz Festival, including Incognito, Dave Koz and Friends Summer Horns, and The Earth, Wind & Fire Experience by Al McKay.
