= Alison Wedding =

American singer (born 1972)

- Born: September 24, 1972 (age 53)
- Genres: Jazz, pop, vocal jazz, alternative rock
- Occupations: Singer-songwriter, musician
- Instruments: Vocals, piano
- Years active: 2000–present
- Labels: Group UP Music, Ropeadope
- Website: www.alisonwedding.com

Alison Wedding (born 1972) is an American singer and composer.

== Early life and education ==
Alison Wedding was born in 1972. She is based in New York City and she holds a degree from the University of North Texas.

== Career ==
She has performed with jazz musicians Gerry Mulligan, Dianne Reeves, Joe Chindamo, Bob Sedergreen, and Peter Knight. Before moving to New York in 2007, Wedding was based in Melbourne from 2001 to 2007 where she performed and recorded throughout Australia. She holds a degree from the University of North Texas. Her album, This Dance was produced by Michael League of Snarky Puppy and featured special guests Lionel Loueke, Chris Potter, and Theo Bleckmann.

=== Australian Jazz Bell Awards ===
The Australian Jazz Bell Awards, (also known as the Bell Awards or The Bells), are annual music awards for the jazz music genre in Australia. They commenced in 2003.

Year	Nominee / work	Award	Result
2004	The Secret	Best Australian Jazz Vocal Album	Won

== Discography ==
=== As leader ===
- The Secret, ABC Jazz (2003)
- Sometimes I Feel, Jazzhead (Australian label) (2004)
- Live at the BMW Edge (2004)
- This Dance, GroundUP/Ropeadope (2012)

=== As guest ===
- Cathy Segal-Garcia, background vocals on Secret Life, Dash Hoffman (label) (2001)
- Peter Knight, Between Two Moments, New Market (Australian label) (2001)
- Andy Summers, Peggy's Blue Skylight, vocals on "Remember Rockefeller at Attica", BMG/RCA Victor (2002)
- Mark Lockett, About Time, Move Records (2004)
- Gabriel Espinosa, From Yucatan to Rio, ZOHO Music L.L.C. (2008)
- Hendrik Meurkens (de) and Gabriel Espinosa, Celebrando, ZOHO Music L.L.C. (2011)
- Hendrik Meurkens (de) and Gabriel Espinosa, Samba Little Samba, ZOHO Music L.L.C. (2013)
- Michael Reinhart, background vocals on Echo, And Sum Music (label) (2013)
