= Mackey Feary =

American musician (1955–1999)

- Born: August 13, 1955
- Died: February 20, 1999 (aged 43)
- Education: Kalani High School
- Occupation: Musician

Bryant Mackey Feary Jr. (August 13, 1955 – February 20, 1999) was an American musician. He was a member of the Hawaiian music pop/rock/folk band Kalapana.

== Early life ==
Feary Jr. was born August 13, 1955, to Bryant Mackey Feary Sr. and Regina Feary. Feary Jr. began playing music at the age seven, and got his first guitar when he was eleven. He attended Kalani High School in Honolulu, and by sixteen was performing live at the Oar House in Hawaii Kai.

== Kalapana (1973-1976) ==
During the 1970s Hawaiian music experienced a popular resurgence. The new music captured the feeling and social issues of living in Hawaii, but was closer in style to pop-rock groups like the Eagles and Fleetwood Mac, than it was to traditional Hawaiian music. Bands like Country Comfort, Cecilio & Kapono, Keola and Kapono Beamer, and Olomana were playing to capacity crowds at concert halls and arenas, and their albums were selling thousands of copies.

In late 1973, music manager Ed Guy, who worked with Cecilio & Kapono, was looking to put together a band that could capitalize on the new Hawaiian sound. After scouting and auditions Guy felt the most promising were Feary (then 17 years old), Malani Bilyeu, DJ Pratt, and Kirk Thompson. Guy encouraged the quartet to form a band.

Feary and Bilyeu were the lead singers and played guitar, Pratt was lead guitarist, and Thompson played keyboards and bass guitar. Added to the group were saxophonist Michael Paulo, and drummer Alvin Fejerang. The group chose their name by blindfolding Pratt and having him point at a map of the Hawaiian Islands. Pratt pointed to the town of Kalapana, on the Big Island of Hawaii. Soon after, they were the house band at The Toppe Ada Shoppe club and the opening act for concerts by the Moody Blues, Earth, Wind & Fire, and Cecilio & Kapono.

In 1975, a few months before Feary's 20th birthday, they released their first album, Kalapana I. The album, composed mainly by Feary and Bilyeu, captured the feel of living in Hawaii while embracing pop, rock, folk, and jazz. Tours of Japan, Guam, Samoa, and California followed.

A year later they released Kalapana II, again mainly composed by Feary and Bilyeu. The album won the band two Nani Awards including Best Male Vocalist for Feary. Their popularity resulted in a concert with Cecilio & Kapono at Aloha Stadium for 20,000 fans. It was considered one of the biggest local music concerts ever. Despite the success, group tensions caused Feary's departure in 1977.

== Solo work ==
Feary formed the first version of the Mackey Feary Band which was originally the backup band for Billy Kaui, included Boom and Keefe Gaspar, Creed Fernandez, George Lustenberg, and Gaylord Holomalia. The second version with Kevin Daley, David Yoshiteru, and Gaylord Holomalia released their self-titled debut in 1978. For their second album, 1979's From the Heart, Yoshiteru was replaced by Beau Evans. Feary produced both albums composed the majority of the songs continuing Kalapana's Hawaii-themed pop-rock-jazz style. In 1980, when the Mackey Feary Band disbanded, Feary partnered with vocalist Nohelani Cypriano for the single, "Let's Do It/We Both Waited Too Long".

The next year Feary, Kenji Sano (bassist), and Maurice Bega (guitarist/vocalist) formed the band Mackey Feary & Nite Life. With back up from Gerry Davis on drums and George Tavy on piano they released the album Mackey Feary & Nite Life in 1983. Feary released Touch Sensitive, his first completely solo album in 1984. The album featured saxophonist Jerry Martini of Sly & the Family Stone.

Feary permanently reunited with Kalapana in 1986 and released only one more solo album of new material, 1994's Burning Bridges, before his death. Two solo compilations, Black & White and Back to Back, were released in 1995.

== Kalapana reunion ==
In 1982 Hawaii-based concert promoter Tom Moffatt convinced Feary, Bilyeu, Thompson, Paulo, and Fejarang, to reunite for a successful concert at the Waikiki Shell. Moffatt also released a live album of the concert, Kalapana Reunion. In the album's liner notes, international disc jockey, Kamasami Kong called them the Beatles of Hawaii.

After the successful reunion Kalapana reformed in 1986 with Feary, Bilyeu, Pratt, and new members Kenji Sano, who had worked with Feary in Nite Life, and Gaylord Holomalia, from the Mackey Feary Band. Kalapana released the albums Hurricane and Lava Rock in 1986–87. Throughout the 1990s they toured extensively, and released the albums, Back in Your Heart Again, Walk Upon the Water, and Full Moon Tonight. The group's popularity in Japan allowed their album Captain Santa's Island Music to be funded by a Japanese clothing company, and the songs were used in that company's commercials.

== Personal life ==
Much of Feary's private life was kept out of the public eye. In the early 1980s he met and married Marci Fogel from Vista, California. They had one son, Sebastian, who is Feary's only biological child. In the early 1990s, Marci and Feary divorced and soon after Feary married Danalee Akana. After two years of marriage Feary and Akana separated, but remained legally married.

== Final years, legal troubles, and death ==
Feary's final years were marked by very public legal and drug problems. His public troubles started September 4, 1996, when he broke Akana's car windshield with a hammer and rammed her car with his in a shopping center parking lot. When police arrested him they found crystal methamphetamine in his possession. The next day, Feary tried to hang himself in his jail cell but was revived. He pleaded guilty to all charges and served six months of a one-year sentence.

Released in the summer of 1997, Feary returned to nightly solo performing in various clubs and restaurants in Honolulu. He participated in a partial drug rehabilitation program and reconciled with Akana.

Kalapana held their 25th Anniversary Concert in 1998 at the Waikiki Shell. At the soundcheck of the November 8, 1998, concert, Feary was arrested for breaking a restraining order. He was bailed out of jail a few hours before the concert.

On January 21, 1999, Feary's probation was revoked when he tested positive for methamphetamine, failed to complete a drug rehab program, and broke a restraining order. He was sentenced to ten years in prison.

Feary's final appeal was rejected on February 18, 1999. Two days later Feary used bed sheets to hang himself in his jail cell on February 20. He was 43 years old.

== Legacy ==
Feary's funeral was attended by an estimated 2,000 family, friends, and fans.

Feary's suicide brought public attention to drug problems and treatment in Hawaii. His death also sparked the Hawaii legal system to alter its process for dealing with drug addicts.

Feary's sister Dancetta Kamai, son Sebastian, and father Bryant Sr. won a lawsuit against the State of Hawaii for negligence in the handling of Feary as a prisoner. Kamai became a spokesperson for drug treatment and awareness. She, and other advocates, lobbied the State of Hawaii to change the way drug offenses are handled in the courts. In 2002 Governor Ben Cayetano passed a law that gave drug addicts rehab treatment and also viewed drugs as a public health issue.

Kalapana held a Feary memorial concert at the Sheraton-Waikiki Hawaii Ballroom on April 14, 2001. Maurice Bega, Feary's friend and former member of Nite Life, performed Feary's vocals at the concert. The band's 2002 release, Blue Album, was also dedicated to Feary.

Feary's sister Dancetta Kamai raises and breeds white monarch butterflies, which she has named "Mackey's Monarchs", in honor of Feary.

When Honolulu Magazine took polls of "Greatest Hawaii Albums and Songs", they ranked Feary's 1975 composition "Nightbird" as the 50th best Hawaiian song. The magazine ranked Kalapana's debut album as the 10th Greatest Hawaiian album.

In 2011 Feary posthumously, along with the other early members of Kalapana—Bilyeu, Pratt, Thompson, Paulo, Fejarang, Aloya and Holomalia—received the Na Hoku Hanohano Lifetime Achievement Award from the Hawaii Academy of Recording Arts.

== Partial discography ==
=== Solo work ===
- Mackey Feary Band (self-titled LP) – 1978
- From The Heart (with the Mackey Feary Band) – 1979
- "Let's Do It/We've Both Waited Too Long" (single with Nohelani Cypriano) – 1980
- Mackey Feary & Nite Life (with the Nite Life Band) – 1982
- Touch Sensitive – 1984
- Burning Bridges – 1994
- Black & White (compilation CD) – 1995
- Back to Back (compilation CD) – 1995

=== With Kalapana ===
- Kalapana I – 1975
- Kalapana II – 1976
- Kalapana Reunion – 1983
- Hurricane – 1986
- Lava Rock – 1987
- Back in your Heart Again – 1990
- Kalapana Sings Southern All*Stars (release in Japan) – 1991
- Walk Upon the Water - 1992
- Full Moon Tonight – 1993
- Captain Santa's Island Music – 1996
- Best of Kalapana Vol. 1 (compilation) – 1997
- Best of Kalapana Vol. 2 (compilation) – 2004
- Black Sand: the Best of Kalapana - 2018
