= JJF =

JJF may refer to:

- Jakarta International Java Jazz Festival, as a music festival
- Jumpin' Jack Flash, a song by the Rolling Stones
