= Kalapana (band) =

Hawaiian music group

- Origin: Honolulu, Hawaii, U.S.
- Genres: Rock and roll, folk rock, soft rock
- Years active: 1974–present
- Labels: Abattoir Records, Bluewater Records, Pony Canyon Records, OTB Records, Manifesto Records, Kalapana Music
- Members: Gaylord Holomalia; Kenji Sano
- Past members: Kirk Thompson; David John "DJ" Pratt; Carl James "Malani" Bilyeu; Mackey Feary; Kimo Cornwell; Maurice Bega; Michael Paulo; Randy Aloya; Alvin Fejarang

Kalapana is an American pop-rock band from Honolulu, Hawaii. They are known for their songs "Naturally", "Nightbird", and "The Hurt".

== History ==
=== Early history (1973–1986) ===
In 1973, childhood friends DJ Pratt and Malani Bilyeu auditioned at the Rainbow Villa for Cecilio & Kapono. Bilyeu was a solo performer at the Oar House in Hawaii Kai while Pratt was downstairs at Chuck's in Sunlight with Kirk Thompson. They got together in Pratt's grandfather's garage with Mackey Feary, another solo act at the Oar House. They wrote songs, rehearsed, and at one point discussed the meaning of Kalapana. The literal translation of the word "Kalapana" is "sprouting money". Thompson said the meaning was "beat of the music", but he preferred the name "Dove" for the band. Pratt thought it meant "black sand". Regardless, they named themselves Kalapana, playing their first gig at Chuck's in Hawaii Kai.

Kalapana became a regular band at a Honolulu club called The Toppe Ada Shoppe. They opened concerts for Earth, Wind & Fire, Batdorf & Rodney, The Moody Blues, Sly & The Family Stone, and Cecilio & Kapono.

In 1975, the band released their debut self-titled album Kalapana, featuring Jackie Kelso on sax and flute, Bill Perry on bass, and Larry Brown on drums. The album was a big success in Hawaii and Japan.

Their second album Kalapana II was released in late 1976. The band performed a three-concert event at the Waikiki Shell during the span of June 25–27, 1976, where 25,000 people attended.

Kalapana won two Nani Awards, the predecessor to the Na Hoku Hanohano Awards. They were nominated for four categories and received Best Performance by a Duo or Group, and Best Male Vocalist (for Feary), who by year's end had split from the group for a solo career.

With Pratt, Bilyeu, and Thompson remaining, the group added bassist and vocalist Randy Aloya (replacing the departed Feary), sax and woodwinds player Michael Paulo, and drummer Alvin Fejarang. The band's third album Kalapana III was released in late 1977. Earlier that year, Kalapana helped select the entrants for the "Home Grown" album project.

Kalapana's fourth album Many Classic Moments, primarily a soundtrack to the Gary Capo-helmed surf film of the same name, was released in 1978. The domestic version of the album contained eight Kalapana tracks while the Japanese version was a two-record set with 22 tracks total, featuring additional orchestral music composed by David Wheatley.

With Kalapana's popularity in Japan going strong, the band toured there regularly, adding keyboardist and guitarist Kimo Cornwell (formerly of Beowolf and later with Hiroshima). The 1978 live album In Concert was released only in Japan. After the album's release, Kirk Thompson left the band to pursue a solo career as a producer. His first project as writer, arranger, and producer, the self-titled (and only) album by new Hawaii band Lemuria, was released in 1979.

Kalapana continued as a six-piece with the 1979 album Northbound. Randy Aloya left the group soon after the album's release, with Malani Bilyeu and Michael Paulo also exiting after the album's tour had ended.

In 1980, DJ Pratt and Alvin Fejarang continued as Kalapana and released Hold On and the live album Japan Jam Live, both Japan-only releases. The band would then go on hiatus.

On December 26, 1982, Bilyeu, Feary, Thompson, Fejarang, Paulo, and Aloya played a one-night "Kalapana Live Reunion" concert at the Waikiki Shell with Hawaii guitarist John Rapoza standing in for Pratt. Kalapana then went dormant for several years while the various members pursued separate projects.

=== Hurricane and Pony Canyon (1986–1999) ===
In 1986, Kalapana reunited as a quintet—Bilyeu, Feary, and Pratt plus Gaylord Holomalia (keyboards) and Kenji Sano (electric bass) – and recorded a successful comeback album, Hurricane. Kalapana presented the album at a release party at Rascals discothèque in Waikiki. The invitations were sent out with singles from the album; roses and T-shirts were given away at the venue.

For the "Hurricane" concert, the band wore suits. For the song "Living Without You", the band was brought out wearing white zoot suit dinner jackets with red velvet bow ties. Kenji, Mackey, Malani, and DJ performed choreography during the concert while Gaylord anchored the group on keyboards.

Kalapana released Lava Rock in 1987, and performed with Hiroshima and Anri, musicians from Japan. Kalapana played at the grand opening of the Hard Rock Cafe in Honolulu. They performed in the Philippines for crowds of 10,000 people at two sold-out concerts, toured Japan, the west coast of the contiguous US, Tahiti, Samoa, Guam, Saipan, and outer islands; their first feature-length video of the Lava Rock Concert was taped at the Waikiki Shell. Kalapana toured Japan with Michael Paulo, who was then with Al Jarreau's band, and Tris Imboden, the drummer for Chicago. Following, Kalapana signed a five-album deal with Pony Canyon Records.

In 1997, Kalapana released the Hawaii version of Captain Santa Island Music with liner notes by international radio DJ Kamasami Kong. More recently, Kalapana released, in Japan, another CD titled The Very Best of Kalapana, a compilation of twenty songs.

After battling drugs, drug treatment programs, and relapses, Mackey Feary was sentenced to prison. On February 20, 1999, Feary hanged himself in his jail cell. Feary's problems and eventual suicide called attention to the patterns of drug addiction and mental health and treatment needs.

=== Post-Feary era (1999 and onward) ===
During the summer of 1999, Kalapana released "Love Under the Sun", the title song for FM Nagoya's compilation CD, which was used for FM Nagoya's Summer Campaign. Also, they recorded the theme song for the Asahi Super Cup, a series of sailboat races held off the coast of Oahu. Both recordings were done at TK Disc Studios, which are Japanese recording artist/producer Tetsuya Komuro's recording studios in Hawaii.

In November 2002, the group released the studio album the Blue Album. Two songs off of the said album feature Maurice Bega on vocals. Guest artists included the group Chant singing background vocals on "Ten Years After" (written by Komuro), Tris Imboden from the band Chicago on "Another Lonely Night", Michael Paulo on saxophone, and Pauline Wilson and Garin Poliahu on drums. James Studer appears throughout the CD with arrangements and keyboards.

Kalapana continues to tour and record in Japan and the West Coast. The releases, to date, on Pony Canyon are: "Back In Your Heart Again", "Kalapana Sings Southern All-Stars", and "Walk Upon the Water". The fourth LP, "Full Moon Tonight", was released at the time of the royal wedding in Japan in June 1995, and included a new version of "Hawaiian Wedding Song" done R & B style. Their latest album on Pony Canyon Records, "Captain Santa Island Music", consists of songs written for a clothing line in Japan. Each album contains new arrangements of Kalapana classics and newly written songs.

Kalapana received the Hawaii Academy of Recording Arts Lifetime Achievement Award in 2011. The recipients were Bilyeu, Feary (posthumously), Pratt, Thompson, Fejarang, Paulo, Aloya, Holomalia, and Sano.

On Sunday, November 20, 2016, Kalapana, performed in Honolulu with the Honolulu Youth Symphony with a line-up of Bilyeu, Pratt, Holomalia, Aloya (bass guitar), John Valentine (guitar), Garin Poliahu drums, and Todd Yukumoto (sax).

On December 27, 2018, Malani Bilyeu died of a heart attack on Kauaʻi. He was 69. From the beginning, Bilyeu was one of Kalapana's resident songwriters. His contributions included "Naturally", "You Make It Hard", "Dorothy Louise", "(For You) I'd Chase a Rainbow", "Girl", and "Many Classic Moments."

On September 7, 2021, DJ Pratt was found unresponsive in his home. He was 67. Pratt received two Na Hoku Hanohano Awards for his work as a member of Kalapana. He earned three more for his work as a recording studio engineer.

=== Legal action against Abattoir Records ===
The early recordings of Kalapana were originally released on Abattoir Records, a label based in Los Angeles and owned by Ed Guy. However, Guy never paid any royalties, and the band received nothing from Guy for approximately forty years. In June 2017, the original members of the band (with Feary's son and heir Sebastian) sued Guy in federal court in Los Angeles for rescission of the mid-1970s agreements. The case was settled quickly, and Guy transferred all of his rights back to the band, including all music publishing rights.

As a result, on November 30, 2018, under Manifesto Records, the seven-album, eight-CD box set The Original Album Collection and the single-CD "best of" package Black Sand: The Best of Kalapana were released.

== Discography ==
=== Studio albums ===
- Kalapana (1975)
- Kalapana II (1976)
- Kalapana III (1977)
- Many Classic Moments (1978)
- Northbound (1979, Japan only)
- Hold On (1980, Japan only)
- Alive (1981)
- Hurricane (1986)
- Lava Rock (1987)
- Back in Your Heart Again (1990)
- Kalapana Sings Southern All Stars (1991, Japan only)
- Walk Upon the Water (1992)
- Full Moon Tonight (1993)
- Captain Santa Island Music (1996)
- Blue Album (2002)
- Many Classic Moments: Kalapana Plays Their Best (2007)

=== Live albums ===
- In Concert (1978)
- Japan Jam Live (1980, Japan only)
- Reunion (1983)

=== Compilation albums ===
- Kalapana's Greatest Hits of the Seventies (1979)
- Kalapana's Surfin' Best (1980)
- Kalapana's Best Live (1980)
- Endless Summer (Credited to "Malani Bilyeu & Kalapana") (1982)
- Seaside Romance (Credited to "Mackey Feary & Kalapana") (1982)
- Best Album (1986)
- Best of Kalapana (1986)
- Greatest Hits Vol. 1 / グレイテスト・ヒッツ～波の数だけ抱きしめて (1990)
- The Best of Kalapana Vol. 1 (1992)
- Greatest Hits (1995)
- The Very Best of Kalapana (1997)
- Best (1998)
- The Best of Kalapana Vol. 2 (2004)
- Super Best (2009)
- Best Collection (2009)
- 1975 - 1981 (CD Box Set) (2012)
- Mellowgroove Breeze of Kalapana (2012)
- (The Premium Best) Kalapana 40th Anniversary Best (2013)
- Kalapana: The Original Album Collection (CD Box Set) (2018)
- Black Sand: The Best of Kalapana (2018)
- Aloha Got Soul Selects Kalapana (7" Singles Box Set) (2023)
- Kalapana 50th Anniversary: Timeless Voyage (2025)

=== Singles ===
- The Hurt / Naturally (1975)
- Nightbird / The Hurt (c.1975)
- Dorothy Louise / Lost Again (1976)
- Juliette / Black Sand (1977)
- Girl / Mana (1977)
- Alisa Lovely / Inarajan (The Village) (1977)
- Alisa Lovely / Mana (1977)
- Many Classic Moments / The Ultimate (1978)
- Rainy Day / Merry-Go-Round (1979)
- I Need a Good Friend / Tropical Typhoon (1980)
- Hurricane / Tonight (1986)
- The Hurt (Tropical Dance Mix) (1990, Disc jockey exclusive)
- The Hurt (Tropical Dance Mix) / Informer (c.1992, Disc jockey exclusive)
- Chablis / Hawaiian Wedding Song (1993)
- Seaside M / Seaside M (1993)
- Real Thing / Real Thing (1993)
- Pacific Oasis EP (with Henry Kapono & Pauline Wilson) (1994)
