= Nusantara International Convention Exhibition =

Convention center in Tangerang Regency, Banten, Indonesia

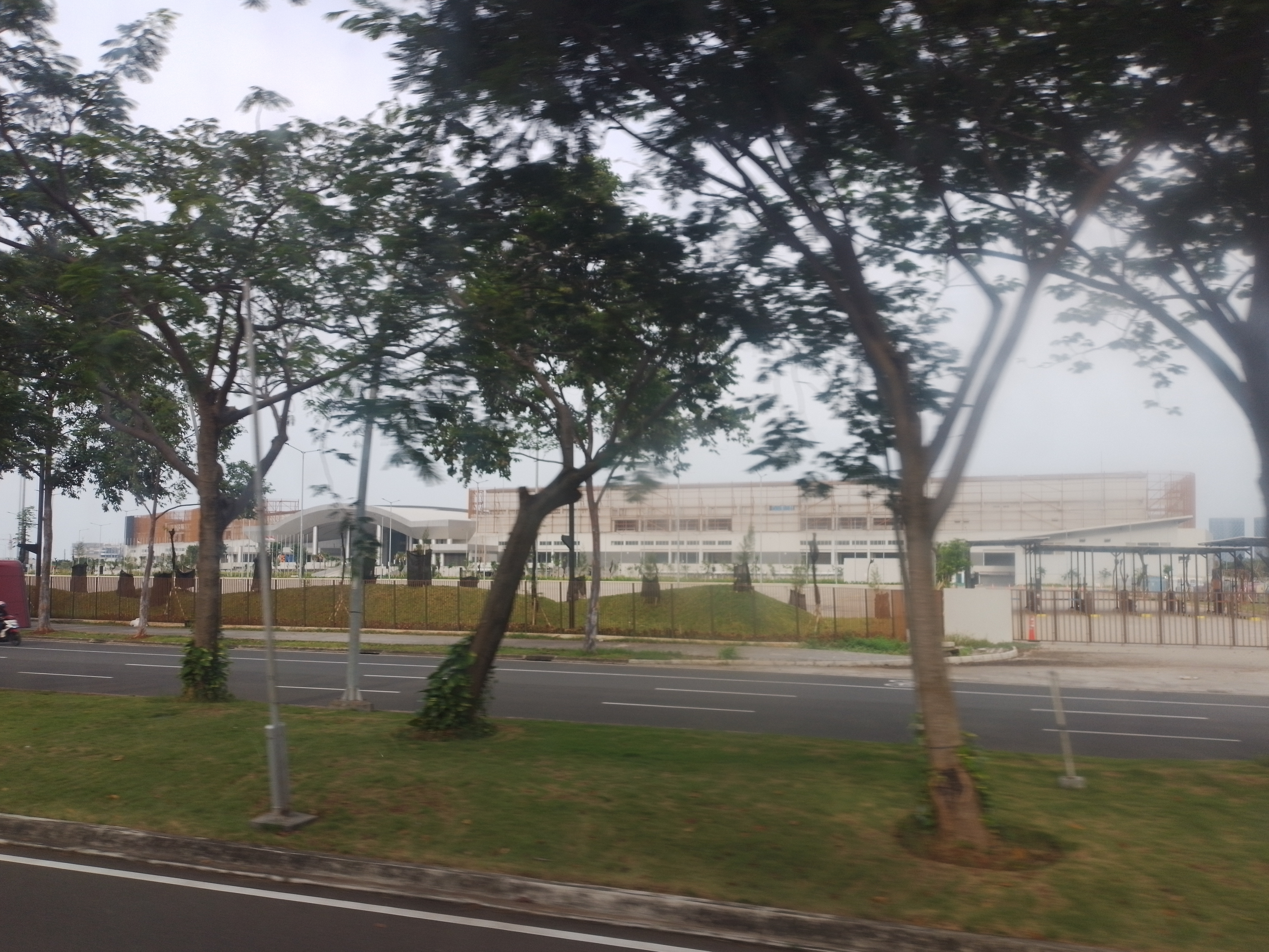
- West view of the building seen from outside
- Interactive map of Nusantara International Convention Exhibition
- Address: M.H. Thamrin St., Pantai Indah Kapuk 2, Salembaran, Kosambi, Tangerang Regency, Banten, Indonesia.
- Coordinates: 6.0549994°S 106.6909488°E
- Owner: PT. Industri Pameran Nusantara (Agung Sedayu Group and Salim Group)
- Operator: PT. Industri Pameran Nusantara

Construction
- Opened: 30 August 2025
- Cost: Rp 4 trillion
- Architect: PTI Architects

Website
- https://nice-nusantaraconvex.com

Nusantara International Convention Exhibition (NICE) is a convention and exhibition center located in the Pantai Indah Kapuk 2 township within Kosambi, Tangerang Regency, Banten, Indonesia, which is about 32 kilometres (20 mi) northwest of the Jakarta city center. With a total floor space of 380,000 m^{2}, it is the largest convention center in Indonesia by floor space, surpassing the Indonesia Convention Exhibition in BSD City with 220,000 m^{2} floor area.

== Specifications and facilities ==
Nusantara International Convention Exhibition is built on 40 hectares (99 acres) of land with the building's total space of 380,000 m^{2}. It consists of three buildings containing a total of 11 exhibition halls, two breakout/meeting rooms named after Nakula and Sadewa from the Mahabharata epic, and leasable retail zones. The first two buildings each contain four halls, while the third one is smaller and only contain three halls. The three buildings are connected by an atrium spanning east-west with a length of 397 m.

== Events ==
A meditation event named IONATION 6 was held as the first event in NICE, coinciding with the latter's soft opening on 30 August 2025. Due to of its large space, many Jakarta-based, large-scale events moved here starting from 2026, including Hammersonic Festival held on 2–3 May 2026, and the Java Jazz Festival (previously at the Jakarta International Expo) on 29–31 May of the same year.

== Transportation ==
NICE is accessible through the Kamal–Telugnaga–Rajeg (Katara) Toll Road at the Salembaran exit (and current terminus), which is connected to the Prof. Dr. Ir. Soedijatmo Toll Road towards the Soekarno–Hatta International Airport and other important places in Jakarta and Tangerang. For public transit, the Transjakarta bus rapid transit (BRT) network currently provides route T31, a cross-border (Transjabodetabek) feeder route connecting PIK 2 with Blok M in South Jakarta by passing the Sudirman business district. PIK 2 itself also has a shuttle bus service that terminates in front of NICE.

== See also ==
- Pantai Indah Kapuk 2
- List of convention and exhibition centers

Other convention center or concert venues in Greater Jakarta:

- Beach City International Stadium
- Gelora Bung Karno Stadium
- Indonesia Arena
- Istora Gelora Bung Karno
- Indonesia Convention Exhibition
- Jakarta International Convention Center
- Jakarta International Expo
- The Kasablanka
