= Steve McQueen (disambiguation) =

Steve McQueen most often refers to:

- Steve McQueen (1930–1980), an American actor who appeared in 1960s and 1970s films
- Steve McQueen (director) (born 1969), a British film director, screenwriter and video artist

Steve McQueen may also refer to:

== Music ==
- Steve McQueen (album), an album by Prefab Sprout
- "Steve McQueen" (M83 song), 2011
- "Steve McQueen" (Sheryl Crow song), 2002
- "Steve McQueen" (The Automatic song), 2008

== People ==
- Steven R. McQueen (born 1988), actor Steve McQueen's grandson, an American actor

== Fictional characters ==
- Steve McQueen (House character), a rat character in the TV series House
- Stephen C. McQueen, the protagonist in The Understudy, a novel by David Nicholls (writer)

== Others ==
- The Steve McQueens, Singaporean band
