= Djakarta Warehouse Project =

Dance music festival held in Jakarta, Indonesia

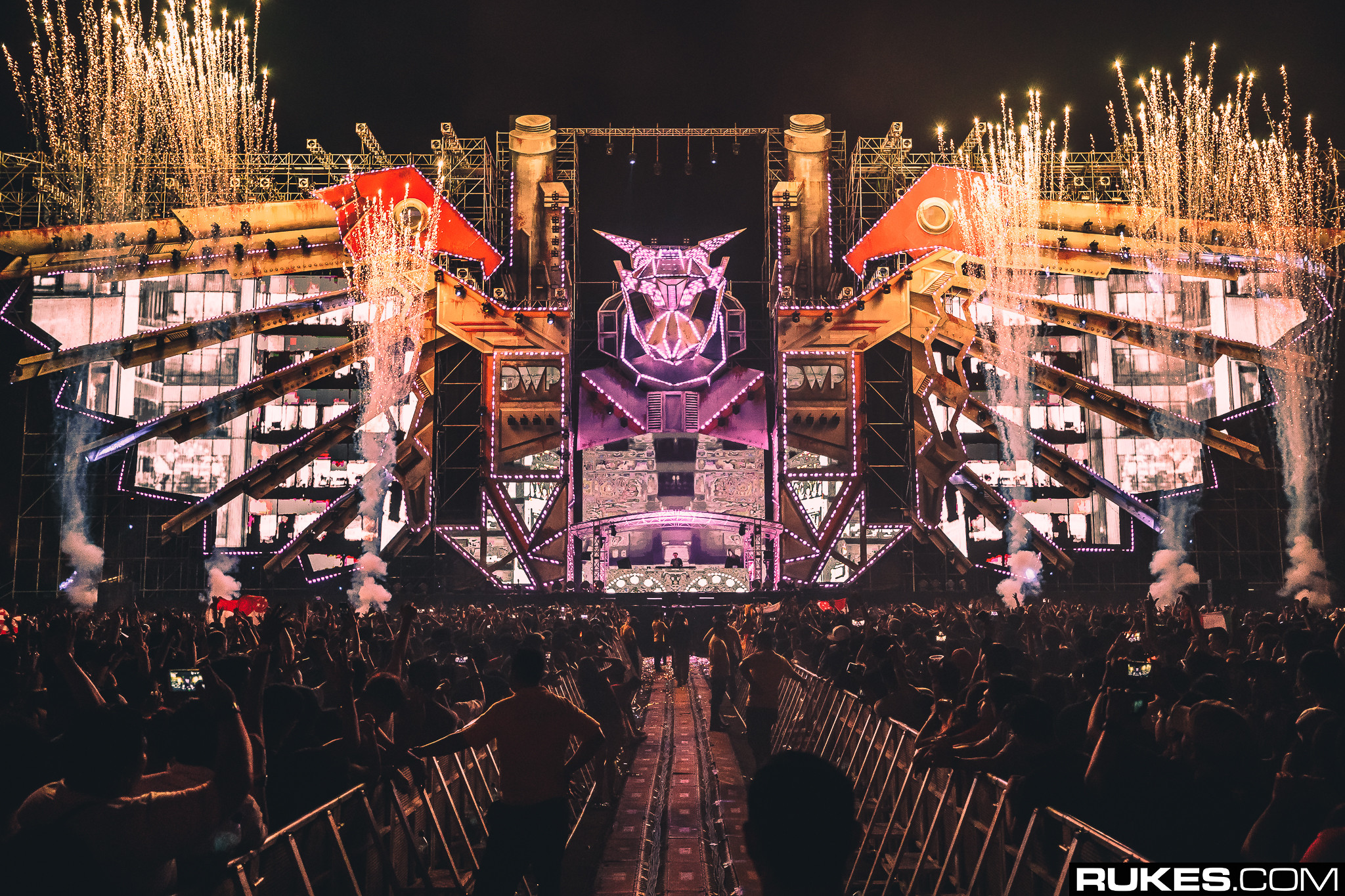
- Garuda Land, the main stage of Djakarta Warehouse Project (in 2017 edition).
- Status: Active
- Genre: Electronic dance music, pop, indie, hip hop
- Date: 2nd Weekend of December
- Frequency: Annually
- Location: Pantai Carnaval Ancol (2010); Tennis Indoor Senayan (2011); Istora Senayan (2012); Ancol Eco Park (2013); Garuda Wisnu Kencana Cultural Park (2018, 2023); Jakarta International Expo (2014-2017, 2019, 2022, 2024)
- Years active: 2010–Present
- Inaugurated: 2008
- Founder: Christian Rijanto
- Most recent: December 13–14–15, 2024 (DWP24)
- Next event: December 12–13–14, 2025 (DWP25)
- Attendance: 90,000 (per 2016)
- Capacity: 90,000–100,000 (depending on venue)
- Major events: Electronic Music Dance Party
- Organiser: Ismaya Live
- Member: Ismaya Group
- Website: djakartawarehouse.com

Djakarta Warehouse Project (often abbreviated as DWP) is a dance music festival held in Jakarta, Indonesia. It is currently the biggest electronic music festival in the country and also considered as one of the largest annual electronic dance music festivals in South East Asia, featuring dance music artists from around the world.

== History ==
The festival originated from a nightclub event in 2008 called Blowfish Warehouse Project at Jakarta's renowned night club Blowfish. Featuring 3 arenas within the club's vicinity, the festival's first edition boasted more than 5,000 audience. The second edition of the festival was planned to be held on 24 April 2010. However, a fight broke out three weeks before the planned date of the festival, damaging parts of the venue. Organisers moved the festival to Pantai Carnaval in Ancol and rebranded the festival with a new name, Djakarta Warehouse Project.

The most recent widely reported total attendance figure for Djakarta Warehouse Project dates back to 2016, when the festival attracted approximately 90,000 visitors. More recent coverage from 2024 noted that around 10,000 foreign attendees from 52 countries were present at the event, though no recent updated total attendance statistics have been officially published.

== Incident ==
=== 2010 Blowfish Incident ===
In early April 2010, a violent altercation occurred at Blowfish nightclub, the original venue of the festival’s predecessor, Blowfish Warehouse Project. According to reports, a confrontation between two groups escalated into a large-scale brawl inside the club, resulting in significant property damage and forcing the venue to temporarily cease operations.

The incident occurred only weeks before the scheduled second edition of the Blowfish Warehouse Project, which had been planned for 24 April 2010. Due to the damage and safety concerns arising from the clash, organisers were unable to proceed with the event at the original location. As a result, the festival was relocated to Pantai Carnaval in Ancol.

The move also marked a major turning point for the event. In conjunction with the venue change, organisers rebranded the festival as the Djakarta Warehouse Project (DWP), setting the foundation for its transformation into one of Southeast Asia’s largest electronic dance music festivals in the following years.

=== 2017 Security Deployment ===
For DWP 2017, a combined force of 600 police and military personnel guarded the event. The large deployment was partly due to anticipated oppositional protests from certain community elements.

=== 2019 Moral / Religious Controversy ===
In 2019, the Islamic organization FPI claimed that illicit items (alcohol and condoms) were found at the festival. The Jakarta provincial government announced it would evaluate the future licensing of DWP in response.

=== 2024 Police Extortion Scandal ===
During the 2024 edition of Djakarta Warehouse Project (13–15 December at JIExpo Kemayoran), 18 police officers from various units (Polda Metro Jaya, Polres Metro Jakarta Pusat, Polsek Kemayoran) were detained by the Internal Affairs Division (Propam) of the Indonesian National Police. They were accused of extorting primarily foreign concertgoers.

According to testimonies, undercover officers coerced attendees to take urine tests, then demanded bribes even when the results were negative. Evidence seized from the officers included approximately Rp 2.5 billion in cash. Following internal disciplinary hearings, at least two officers were dishonourably discharged. Moreover, broader investigations led to the reassignment or mutation of a total of 34 officers under Polda Metro Jaya for alleged involvement. Some legal observers and members of the National Police Commission (Kompolnas) argued that the case could involve criminal charges rather than being treated solely as an internal disciplinary matter. Polri later announced that the money confiscated would be returned to the victims.

In response, Ismaya Live (the festival organizer) publicly apologized and stated it would strengthen its cooperation with authorities and safety protocols for future editions.

== See also ==
- Music festivals
