= A New Generation: Paesanos on the New B3 =

Studio album by Tony Monaco and Joey DeFrancesco
- Released: September 2, 2003
- Recorded: December 5–6, 2002
- Genre: Jazz
- Length: 50:19
- Label: Summit
- Producer: Tony Monaco, Kip Sullivan, Joey DeFrancesco

Tony Monaco and Joey DeFrancesco chronology
Master Chops (2002)	A New Generation: Paesanos on the New B3 (2003)	Fiery Blues (2004)

A New Generation: Paesanos on the New B3 is an album by jazz organist Tony Monaco in collaboration with Joey DeFrancesco. The album was released in 2003 on Summit Records and was produced by Monaco, DeFrancesco, and Kip Sullivan. A New Generation reached #18 on Jazzweek's Top 100 in 2003.

== Overview ==
This album is one of several albums associated with a minor resurgence of "Chitlin' Circuit" style jazz music at the time of its release. It also represents the debut of Monaco on a major music label. Along with Monaco on Hammond organ and accordion, the album includes both Monaco's touring band and that of Joey Defrancesco, who plays the Hammond organ along with Craig Ebner and Robert Kraut on guitars, Byron Landham and Louis Tsamous on drums.

== Reception ==
Professional ratings
Review scores
Source	Rating
Allmusic	3.0/5 stars

Alex Henderson of All Music gave the CD a generally favorable review. Ken Hohman of All About Jazz gave the album a positive review writing "A sizzling showdown between the dueling organs of B3 grand master Joey DeFrancesco and up-and-coming master Tony Monaco, Paesanos shows that the unique sound of the Hammond B-3 can still ignite the kind of sparks it did during its heyday in the '60s." Alex Henderson commented in AllMusic "for the most part, New Generation grooves in a soulful, funky, earthy way."

== Track listing ==
(All songs by Tony Monaco except as indicated)

1. "Pasta Faggioli" 6:27
2. "Homily" 6:24
3. "Katarina's Prayer" 5:58
4. "Flat Tire" 6:13
5. "Mona Lisa" (Jay Livingston, Ray Evans) 5:34
6. "Mozzarella" 6:52
7. "Aglio e Olio" 4:01
8. "Oh Marie" (Eduardo di Capua) 5:02
9. "Waltz of the Angels" 2:20
10. "Interview with Pete Fallico's Doodlin' Lounge" 1:28

== Personnel ==
- Tony Monaco – Hammond organ, accordion, executive producer, mastering, mixing, producer
- Joey DeFrancesco – Hammond organ, producer
- Craig Ebner – guitar
- Robert Kraut – guitar
- Byron Landham – drums
- Louis Tsamous – drums

Technical

- David Christensen – executive producer
- Kip Sullivan – executive producer
- Bob D. Macklin – cover photography
- Liz Price – photography
- Joanne Fallico – photography
- Daniel Traynor – artwork, package design
- Joe Veers – audio engineer
- Pete Fallico – liner notes
