= Rene Paulo =

- Born: Irenio Pagarigan Paulo II; June 8, 1930; Schofield, Wisconsin, U.S.
- Died: January 11, 2023 (aged 92) Honolulu, Hawaii, U.S.
- Genres: Classical
- Occupation: Musician
- Instrument: Piano/keyboards

Irenio Pagarigan Paulo (June 8, 1930 – January 11, 2023), better known as Rene Paulo, was an American pianist.

== Biography ==
Born in the rural district of Schofield, Wisconsin, Paulo grew up in Wahiawa, Hawaii. His grandparents on his mother's side were from the Philippines, becoming naturalized US citizens after his grandfather joined the US military. Rene's musical background was in classical music, and he studied briefly at the Juilliard School of Music in New York with Lonnie Epstein and Gerald Tracy. He soon branched out into improvisation, listening to jazz pianists such as Art Tatum, Alec Templeton, Fats Waller, Earl "Fatha" Hines, and boogie woogie styles. He is known as "Hawaii's Favorite and Most Famous Pianist" and has been invited repeatedly to perform in Las Vegas, Los Angeles, and Tokyo. Paulo played with famous artists like Alfred Apaka, Hilo Hattie, Don Ho and Sandii. He played music at a church in Kapolei, Hawaii that was founded by Pastor Danny Yamashiro and is the father of cosmopolitan and versatile saxophonist Michael Paulo. Paulo died in Honolulu on January 11, 2023, at the age of 92.

== Discography ==
- Black Coral, Liberty Records, 1959
- Enchanted Garden, Mahalo Records, 1960
- Rene Paulo Plays in Person , Mahalo Records, 1962
- Tropical Heat Wave, 1963
- Whispering Sands, 1964
- The Best of Rene Paulo, 1995
- The Best of Rene & Akemi Paulo, 1996
- Surftides, 2002
- Waimanalo Moon, 2003
