= Cathy Segal-Garcia =

American jazz singer (born 1953)

Cathy Segal-Garcia (born May 28, 1953) is an American jazz singer. Segal-Garcia attended Berklee College of Music where she played flute and studied arranging and composition.

== Discography ==
- Point of View (1985)
- Song of the Heart (Whynot, 1991)
- Heart to Heart (1998)
- Alone Together (Koyo Sounds, 1998)
- Secret Life (Dash Hoffman, 2001)
- Day by Day with Joe Diorio (Dash Hoffman, 2007)
- In2uition (Dash Hoffman, 2017)
- Dreamsville (Dash Hoffman, 2019)
