= Rendezvous (band) =

- Rendezvous, composed of Hagai Izenberg (left) and Itai Simon (right)

Background information
- Origin: Israel
- Genres: Jazz; Electronica; Indie; Experimental Music
- Label: Independent
- Members: Hagai Izenberg; Itai Simon
- Website: www.rendezvousmusic.co.uk

Rendezvous is a two-piece band consisting of Itai Simon and Hagai Izenberg from Israel. While the two members consider the genre of their music to be electronic pop (or "electropop"), their music is played live with analog instruments with touches of jazz.

Rendezvous’ music has gained significant popularity on the Internet. On their YouTube channel, Rendezvous has accrued more than 1 million views, especially after the band uploaded videos of their recording sessions. Further, as of August 2011, the band's Facebook page has generated over 21,500 followers. Their EP was downloaded thousands of times and has earned good reviews from different music sites as well as from individual bloggers.
In June 2011, the band released "C Sharp", the first single off their debut album. The single was accompanied by 2 remixes by Carl Cox and an animated music video produced by M-I-E studios, London. On September 7, 2011, Rendezvous released a video for the 2nd single from their debut album, "The Murf", animated by Scott Benson. The video reached nearly 100,000 views in just a week, and was well received around the world, getting rave reviews by sites such as Motiongrapher, CBS News and others. "The Murf" single was also accompanied by 3 remixes by John Digweed, Loverush UK! and Timothy Allan.

== Musical style ==
Rendezvous' music is a fusion of electronica and jazz. It can also fall in the experimental music category. Various review describe the music as acid jazz, psychedelic jazz and contemporary jazz. The band's style is inspired mostly by the songs of Pink Floyd, a band Simon loved since childhood.

== History ==
=== Formation ===
Rendezvous’ two members, Itai Simon and Hagai Izenberg, met on their first day at the Rimon School of Jazz and Contemporary Music in Israel, where they both studied music. The name of the band, Rendezvous, was inspired by their gathering with other musicians after their initial meeting at Rimon. The band formed in 2003.

=== First releases ===
On 2004, Rendezvous got together with two friends, also musicians, and produced their first EP. Simon played bass, while Izenberg handled Fender Rhodes keyboards. Their friend, Erez Bachar was the drummer, while their other friend who they just called 'Andrei', was the saxophonist.

The band recorded the live session, which they described as “almost entirely improvised on the spot,” during one session spanning one full night, on a non-working holiday, an Israeli memorial day. At that time, since all studios were closed, the musicians found an empty one that evening where they recorded their session in complete isolation.

After recording, they mastered the tracks at Eshel Studios in Tel Aviv. The band then created a website where they uploaded their EP. The website received thousands of visits and music downloads from all over the world. These downloads made them soar to the top of underground band lists. Radio stations in London, the United States and Canada also began to play their music on the air, and many music blogs throughout the web and internet magazines featured their music and wrote about it. As a sneak peek into their debut album, they uploaded videos of their different studio sessions, all filmed by the renowned Israeli filmmaker, Uzi Adam.

== Discography ==
Live Studio Session (EP) (2004)
C Sharp (Single) (2011)
The Murf (Single) (2011)
Another Round Please (Album) (2012)

== Band members’ profiles ==
Hagai Izenberg was born on March 20, 1978. He started playing the organ when he was only 4 years old and was studying and composing music throughout his childhood.

Hagai studied in Rimon School of Jazz and Contemporary Music, where he met Itai. While choosing the piano as his major instrument, Hagai kept on looking for his own unique sounds which turned out to be vintage analog synthesizers. He now plays Synthesizers for Rendezvous.

The other half of the band, Itai Simon, was born on December 9, 1979. He became interested in music when he was 10 years old and started playing the electric guitar until he reached age 17. From this point onwards, he played bass guitar, which he claimed was his “true calling.” Now, he plays bass for Rendezvous.

Simon was a member of other Israeli rock bands, namely: The Relics (1998), Utopia (1998–2001), Missing Points (2001–2004), The Butterfly Effect (2004–2006) and SugarPlumBaby (2005 to present). He also produces and arranges music and plays bass guitar for other different artists.

Simon teaches at two music schools in Israel: Ulpan Le Muzika - Giv'at Brenner, and Beit Ha'noar - Ra'anana.

== External links and further reading ==
- Official website
- Rendezvous on Reverb Nation
- Rendezvous' Official YouTube channel
- Rendezvous on Bandcamp
