= Hendrik Meurkens =

Dutch harmonica player and jazz musician

Hendrik Meurkens (born 1957) is a Dutch harmonica and vibraphone player of the modern jazz.

He has been described as "the obvious leading player" in harmonica and has been compared to Toots Thielemans.

== Life and career ==
Hendrik Meurkens was born on August 15, 1957 to Dutch parents and spent his early life in Hamburg. He began playing the vibraphone when he was sixteen and started playing the harmonica three years later after listening to a Toots Thielemans recording. He studied with Wolfgang Schlüter from 1976 to 1977.

Meurkens moved to the United States the same year and attended the Berklee College of Music for three years. He lived in Brazil during the early 1980s, moving back to his hometown of Hamburg after a few years. During his time there, Meurkens met Brazilian musician Maurício Einhorn, who gave him a place to sleep during his first few days in the nation. Back in Hamburg, Meurkens toured throughout Europe with a jazz group and was composing for German television.

In 1989, Meurkens released his debut album, Samba Importado, via Bellaphon Records. He was signed onto Concord Records the next year, releasing six albums for the label before exiting during the late 1990s.

As of 2021, he lives in New York City.

== Discography ==
- Samba Importado (L+R/Bellaphon, 1989)
- Sambahia (Concord, 1991)
- Clear of Clouds (Concord, 1992)
- A View From Manhattan (Concord, 1993)
- Slidin' (Concord, 1994)
- October Colors (Concord, 1995)
- Poema Brasileiro (Concord, 1996)
- Quiet Moments (Evidence, 1998)
- Dig This Samba! (Candid, 1998)
- In a Sentimental Mood (A-Records, 1999)
- New York Nights (A-Records, 2000)
- Mundell's Moods with Mundell Lowe (Nagel Heyer, 2000)
- Amazon River (Blue Toucan, 2005)
- New York Samba Jazz Quintet (Zoho, 2007)
- Sambatropolis (Zoho, 2008)
- Samba to Go! (Zoho, 2009)
- A Night in Jakarta (Jawo, 2010)
- Live at Bird's Eye (Zoho, 2011)
- Celebrando (Zoho, 2012)
- Samba Little Samba with Gabriel Espinosa (Zoho, 2014)
- Junity with Misha Tsiganov (HMS Records, 2014)
- Harmonicus Rex (Height Advantage, 2016)
- Cabin In the Sky with Bill Cunliffe (Height Advantage, 2018)
- Cobb's Pocket with Jimmy Cobb (In+Out, 2019)
- Manhattan Samba (Height Advantage, 2020)
- Strollin' with Tony Monaco (Reid Hoyson Productions, 2021)
- Samba Jazz Odyssey with WDR Big Band (Zoho, 2022)
- Christmas Vibes (Reid Hoyson Productions, 2022)
- The Jazz Meurkengers (Cellar Music Group, 2024)
- Samba Tonto (Cellar Music Group, 2026)
