= Tony Monaco =

American jazz organist

- Born: August 14, 1959
- Origin: Columbus, Ohio, U.S.
- Genres: Jazz, soul
- Instrument(s): Organ, accordion, vocals
- Years active: 2000–present

Anthony M. Monaco (born August 14, 1959) is an American jazz organist.

== Biography ==
Monaco played accordion from childhood and was heavily influenced by Jimmy Smith in his youth. In 1971, he switched to the organ after hearing Smith play the instrument, and later received personal mentoring from Smith. In the early 2000s, he recorded his debut album in collaboration with Joey DeFrancesco, A New Generation: Paesanos on the New B3 which reached No. 18 on Jazzweek's Top 100 for the year 2003, and began releasing material on Summit Records. Monaco's career continued in the 2000s with frequent touring and performances with guitarist Pat Martino. Down Beat International Critics Poll placed Monaco in the top 5 jazz organists for the years 2005–2011. His most commercially successful album was East to West which reached No. 4 on Jazzweek's Top 100 for the year 2006. Monaco is also noted for his efforts in jazz education and holds the position of Artist in Residence in Music at Hope College.

== Playing style and critical reception ==
Monaco's work, along with several contemporaries, is associated with a minor resurgence of "Chitlin' Circuit" style jazz.

== Discography ==
=== As leader ===
- The Monacos Are Moving Up (Blue Ash Records, 1976) with The Monaco Family
- Continentale Disco (The Monacos in Europe) (Blue Ash Records, 1979) with The Monaco Family
- Getting in Touch! (Light 'n Jazzy 103.9fm WBBY, 1989)
- Out of Nowhere (1999) Tony Monaco Organ Trio with Joey DeFrancesco (piano/trumpet), Paul Bollenback (guitar), Byron "Wookie" Landham (drums)
- Burnin' Grooves (Summit, 2001)
- Master Chops 'T' (Summit, 2002)
- Intimately Live at the 501 (Summit, 2002)
- A New Generation: Paesanos on the New B3 (Summit, 2003) with Joey DeFrancesco
- Fiery Blues (Summit, 2004)
- East to West (Summit, 2006) with Bruce Forman
- Live at The Orbit Room (Summit, 2008) Tony and his Toronto Trio with Ted Quinlin, Vito Rezza
- Groove: Blue (Q-Rious, 2011 [2015]) with Vinny Valentino, Steve Smith
- Celebration: Life, Love, Music (Summit, 2012) with Joey DeFrancesco
- Live at Cotton Club Japan (Mocloud, 2013) with Yosuke Onuma, Gene Jackson
- New Adventures (TMHP, 2014) with Howard R. Paul, Jim Rupp
- Furry Slippers (Summit, 2015)
- At One (Mocloud, 2016) with Yosuke Onuma, Gene Jackson
- The Definition of Insanity (Summit, 2019)
- The Keys of Cool (RCP/Richie Cole Presents, 2019) with Richie Cole
- Strollin' (Reid Hoyson Productions, 2021) with Hendrik Meurkens, Reid Hoyson, Mark Lucas
- Four Brothers (Summit, 2022) with Kevin Turner, Eddie Bayard, Willie Barthell III
- Over and Over (Summity, 2024) with Zakk Jones, Reggie Jackson

=== As sideman ===
- Moanin' , Nancy Wright (Summit, 2009)
- A Night in Jazz, Ray Mantilla (M.M.C. Produzioni s.r.l., 2010)
- Undeniable: Live at Blues Alley, Pat Martino (HighNote, 2011)
