= Jakarta International Expo =

International expo center in Jakarta, Indonesia

Coordinates: 6.146701°S 106.845681°E

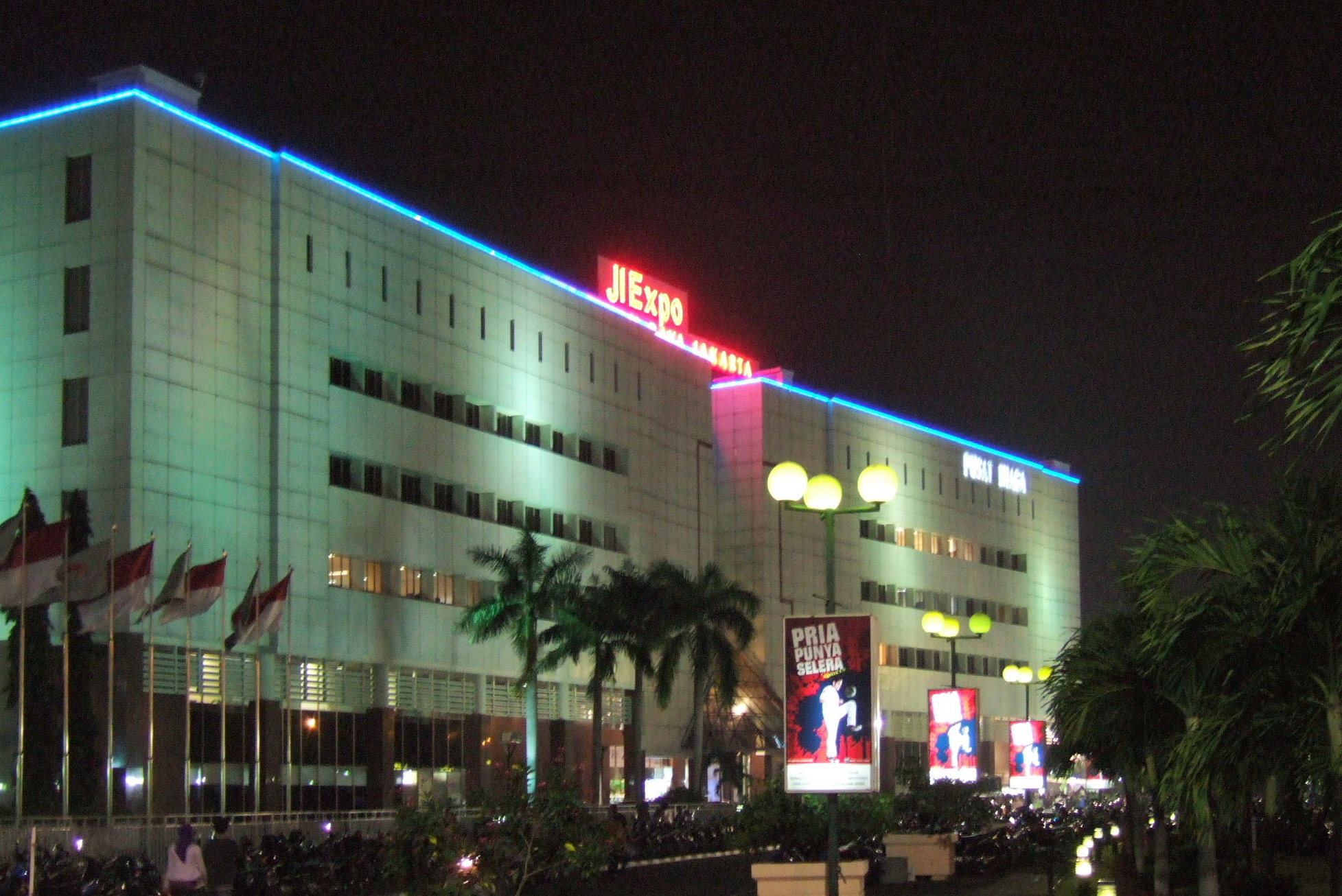
- Exterior of the main exhibition hall (c.2009)
- Interactive map of Jakarta International Expo
- Address: Jalan Benyamin Sueb No. 1
- Location: Pademangan, North Jakarta, Indonesia
- Owner: PT Central Cipta Murdaya; Moerdaja family
- Public transit: JIEXPO Kemayoran

Construction
- Opened: March 2010
- Expanded: 2016-18

Website
- www.jiexpo.com

Jakarta International Expo (JIExpo or JIExpo Kemayoran) is a convention, exhibition and entertainment complex located at Pademangan in North Jakarta, Indonesia. Opened in 2010, it was developed by the Central Cipta Murdaya group, built in the area of the former Kemayoran Airport. JIExpo is the sole venue of the Jakarta Fair, the largest annual trade fair in Indonesia.

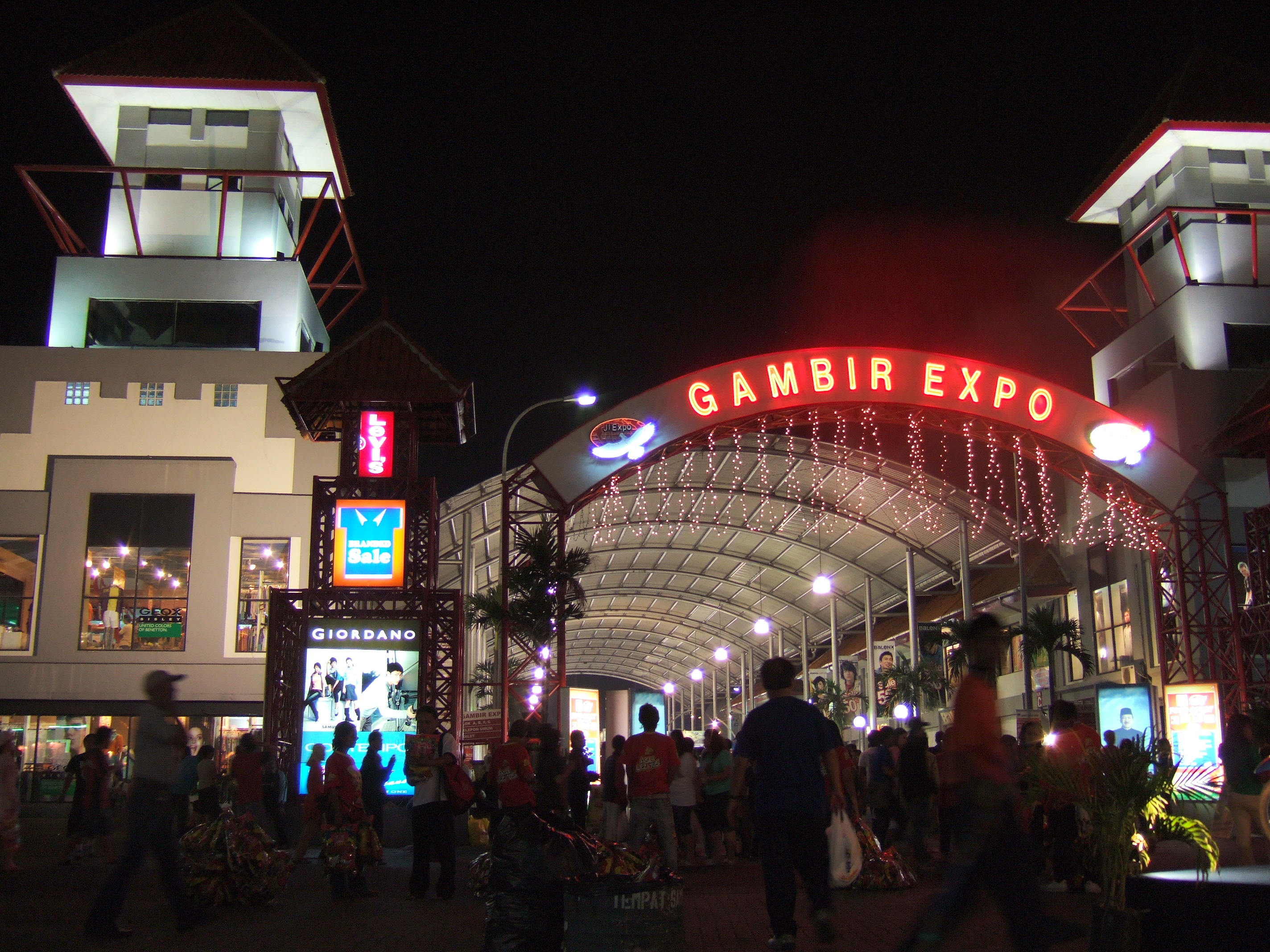
Entrance to the Gambir Expo in 2009

JIExpo covers approximately 44 hectares, with a 2,500-seat theatre and concert hall, 100,000 square meters of exhibition and convention space, and supporting operations. The facility has five exhibition halls, two ballrooms, 14 meeting rooms, and a professional international theatre. JIExpo underwent an expansion from 2016 to 2019, adding an international theatre and convention center. There is also a Holiday Inn Express on the grounds.

== Facilities ==
=== Theatre ===
Completed and commissioned in 2019, the JIExpo Theatre is one of the largest and most advanced performing arts centers in Indonesia. The proscenium arch measures 11m by 30m, with a stage depth of 17m from set line to back wall. The computerized fly system has 80 line sets onstage, and four over the forestage. The orchestra pit can accommodate up to 50 musicians, and the backstage and dressing areas accommodate up to 106 performers.

One of the unique features of the theatre is its acoustic design. The theatre interior is rated at STC 20, and is suitable for symphony and unamplified voice, as well as sound recording. The theatre's opening event was a performance of Bach's Suites for Unaccompanied Cello by renowned cellist Yo-Yo Ma, in his first-ever performance in Indonesia.

The JIExpo Theatre features Meyer Leopard stacks and one of the largest Meyer Constellation systems in a performance venue anywhere in the world as of 2019, according to Meyer Sound. The system has 285 speakers and 51 microphones installed throughout the interior, offering a superior audio experience for both acoustic and amplified performances.

=== Convention Center ===
Located in the JIExpo Theatre complex is the JIExpo Convention Center. It composed of two ballrooms, 12 configurable meeting rooms, and two executive-style Board Rooms. The convention center and theatre lobbies are connected to a 5-star banquet kitchen that provides food and beverage service to all function areas.

The JIExpo Convention Center was also completed and commissioned in 2019.

=== Exhibition halls ===
JIExpo has a series of five exhibition halls surrounding a central outdoor tarmac. It hosts a number of exhibitions, concerts and other national and international events. Annual events, such as Jakarta Fair, Java Jazz Festival, Djakarta Warehouse Project and the Indonesia International Motor Show (IIMS) draw thousands of visitors per year. The facility also hosts large-scale industrial, military and leisure exhibitions, as well as private and entertainment events. In 2018, the exhibition halls hosted boxing, contact bridge, gymnastics, wushu, table tennis and weightlifting tournaments on the 18th Asian Games that year.

== Entertainment events ==
Events from local artists
Events from Asian and regional artists
Events from international artists
Events from both local and international artists

Entertainment events at the Jakarta International Expo
Date(s)	Entertainer(s)	Event
2010
March 5–7	(Headliners): Babyface; John Legend; The Manhattan Transfer; Toni Braxton, and many more	Java Jazz Festival 2010
2011
March 4–6	(Headliners): George Benson; Santana, and many more	Java Jazz Festival 2011
March 13	Stone Temple Pilots	2011 Tour
March 19	2PM; Shontelle; Taio Cruz; Suede	Live & Rockin'
2012
February 25	Evanescence	Live in Jakarta
February 26	Blue; A1; Jeff Timmons	The Greatest Hits Tour
March 2–4	(Headliners): Al Jarreau & George Duke Trio; Erykah Badu; Herbie Hancock; Pat Metheny; Stevie Wonder, and many more	Java Jazz Festival 2012
March 18	Jessie J	Heartbeat Tour
2013
March 1–3	(Headliners): Basia; Joss Stone; Lisa Stansfield; Craig David, and many more	Java Jazz Festival 2013
October 26	OneRepublic	Native Tour
2014
February 28–March 2	(Headliners): Jamie Cullum; Allen Stone; Natalie Cole; India Arie, and many more	Java Jazz Festival 2014
December 12–13	See here	Djakarta Warehouse Project 2014
2015
March 6–8	(Headliners): Lisa Ono; Snarky Puppy; Jessie J; Christina Perri; Chris Botti; Bobby McFerrin, and many more	Java Jazz Festival 2015
August 26	Ariana Grande	The Honeymoon Tour
December 11–12	See here	Djakarta Warehouse Project 2015
2016
March 4–6	(Headliners): Chris Botti; David Foster; Sting; Robin Thicke; Kurt Elling; Tokyo Ska Paradise Orchestra; Seun Kuti & Egypt 80, and many more	Java Jazz Festival 2016
May 22	Joey Alexander	Joey Alexander: Live in Concert
November 12	SHINee	Shinee World V
December 9–10	See here	Djakarta Warehouse Project 2016
2017
March 3–5	(Headliners): Elliott Yamin; Incognito; Ne-Yo; Sergio Mendes, and many more	Java Jazz Festival 2017
March 31	Armin van Buuren	Armin Only
May 13	(Headliners): Above & Beyond; Afrojack	SHVR Ground Festival 2017
August 9	(Headliners): DNCE; NCT 127	Spotify On Stage 2017
August 11–13	(Headliners): The Kooks; Kodaline; Phoenix; Big Sean; G-Eazy, and many more	We the Fest 2017
March 13	Stone Temple Pilots	2011 Tour
September 2	EXO; B.A.P; GFriend; NCT 127; Astro	Music Bank World Tour In Jakarta
September 22	(Headliner): Martin Garrix	Invasion Jakarta 2017
October 13	Taeyang	White Night World Tour
December 15–16	See here	Djakarta Warehouse Project 2017
2018
January 20	Sheila Majid	Live in Concert
January 22	The xx	I See You Tour
February 7	Incubus	Live in Jakarta
March 2–4	(Headliners): Goo Goo Dolls; Daniel Caesar; Lauv	Java Jazz Festival 2018
March 30	The Chainsmokers	Live in Concert
July 20–22	(Headliners): Lorde; James Bay; SZA	We the Fest 2018
September 14	(Headliners): Don Diablo; Yellow Claw	Invasion Jakarta 2018
October 5–7	Dewa 19; Rhoma Irama, and many more	Synchronize Festival 2018
October 12	Alan Walker; Anne-Marie; Stray Kids; Tulus; Slot Machine	Spotify On Stage 2018
November 2	Kygo	Kids in Love Tour
November 10	(Headliners): Blue; The Moffats	The 90's Festival 2018
2019
March 1–3	(Headliners): Toto; H.E.R.; Raveena	Java Jazz Festival 2019
July 19–21	(Headliners): Rae Sremmurd; Troye Sivan; Travis	We the Fest 2019
September 4	Mike Shinoda	Post Traumatic Tour
October 26	Backstreet Boys	DNA World Tour
2023
October 3	Le Sserafim	Le Sserafim Tour "Flame Rises"
2026
November 3	Andrea Bocelli	Romanza 30th Anniversary World Tour

== Transportation ==
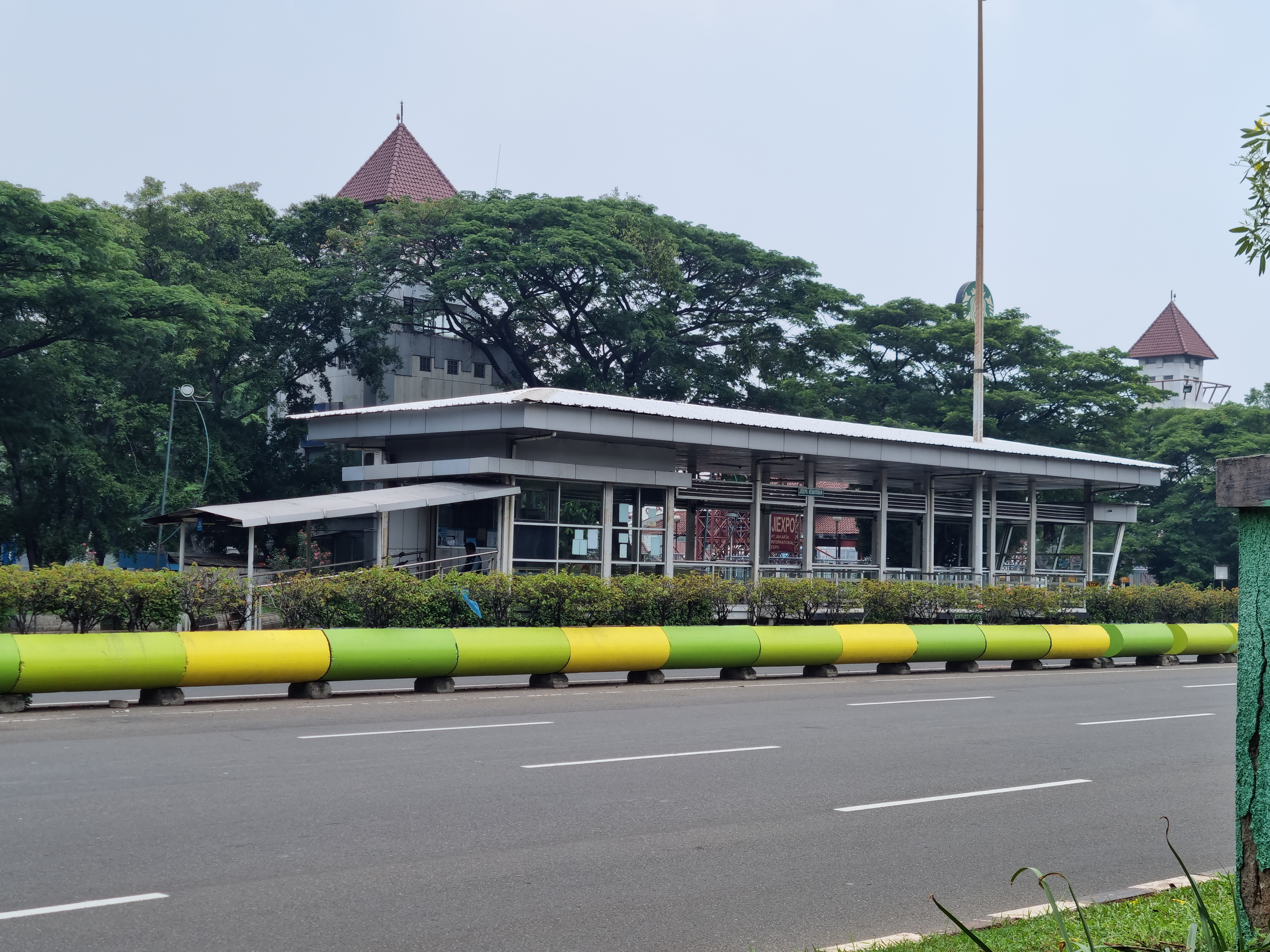
The JIEXPO Kemayoran Transjakarta BRT station, serving northbound corridor 14 buses, as well as Jakarta Fair-exclusive routes

JIExpo is accessible by Transjakarta BRT corridors 12 and 14, with the latter's two trajectories of bus number 14A & 14B. There are three Transjakarta stations nearby JIExpo: Kemayoran, JIEXPO Kemayoran and Landasan Pacu. Only the latter that serves both BRT corridors, while JIEXPO Kemayoran only caters northbound corridor 14 buses to Jakarta International Stadium. JIExpo Kemayoran station also caters feeder route 1W from Ancol one way towards Blok M via toll road. During the Jakarta Fair and/or other events sponsored by Transjakarta, there are three special routes to serve selected events in JIExpo as of 2026, namely route 2C (Balai Kota–JIEXPO), PRJ2 (Kampung Melayu–JIEXPO) and PRJ3 (Pulo Gadung–JIEXPO).

== See also ==
- Kemayoran Airport
- List of convention and exhibition centers
