= Michael Paulo =

American saxophonist (born 1956)

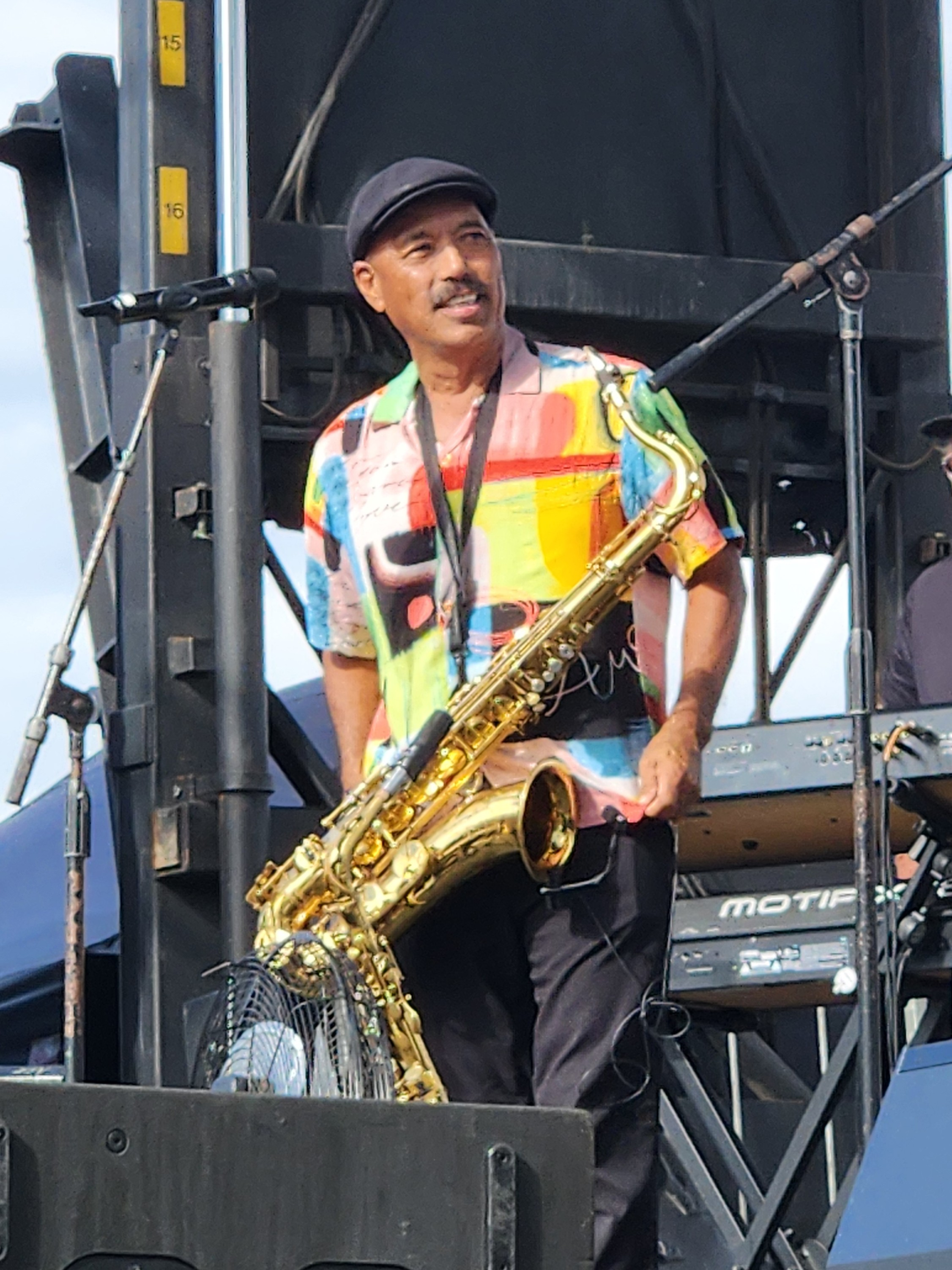
- Paulo performing in 2026

Background information
- Born: Michael Anthony Tatsuo Paulo; May 19, 1956 (age 70); Honolulu, Hawaii, United States
- Genre: Jazz
- Occupation: Musician
- Instrument: Saxophone
- Website: michaelpaulo.com

Michael Anthony Tatsuo Paulo (born May 19, 1956) is an American saxophonist.

== Biography ==
Paulo was born and raised in Hawaii and is the son of pianist Rene Paulo. He is of Filipino and Japanese descent through his parents. He began playing the saxophone at the age of 15. After graduating from Saint Louis High School, he had the opportunity to attend North Texas State University on a music scholarship, but instead chose to join Hawaiian pop/rock band Kalapana, featuring on their four albums from 1975 to 1979. He recorded his first solo album, "Tats" in the Rainbow, which was released in Japan in 1977.

In 1981, he moved to Los Angeles. In 1988, he released his first major solo project entitled One Passion. He then released the albums Fusebox (1990), Save The Children (1994), My Heart And Soul (1996), Midnight Passion (1999), Sax For Christmas (2000), Beautiful (2004), and Michael Paulo Featuring David Benoit and the Magenta Symphony Orchestra (2010). After a hiatus, he released his next album, Beautiful Day, in 2018.

In 1994, he launched his own music label, known as Noteworthy Records. He later launched another label, Apaulo Music Productions.

In 2020, a previously unreleased record by Miles Davis, on which Paulo was featured and was originally recorded in 1986, was released and reached number 1 on the Billboard jazz charts in its first week. In September 2023, he hosted a charity concert to raise money following the 2023 Hawaii wildfires. In October 2023, he released a version of his father's song "Here is Happiness", which became a number one hit in 1962, in honor of his father, after his death.

== Discography ==
The following is a list of albums released by Michael Paulo.

- "Tats" In The Rainbow, Trio Records, 1978
- One Passion, MCA Records, 1988
- Fusebox, GRP, 1990
- Save the Children, Bo-Tree, 1993
- My Heart and Soul, Noteworthy Records, 1996
- Midnight Passion, Noteworthy Records, 1999
- Sax For Christmas, Noteworthy Records, 2000
- Beautiful, Apaulo Productions, 2004
- Michael Paulo Featuring David Benoit and the Magenta Orchestra, 2010
- Beautiful Day, Apaulo Productions, 2018
- Here Is Happiness, Woodward Records, 2024
