= The Steve McQueens =

- Origin: Singapore
- Genres: R&B, pop
- Years active: 2013–present
- Labels: P-Vine
- Members: Eugenia Yip; Joshua Wan; Jase Sng; Anson Koh
- Past members: Bobby Singh; Ben Poh; Marcus Szeto; Fabian Lim; Aaron Lee; Andrew Lim
- Website: thestevemcqueens.wordpress.com

The Steve McQueens is a Singapore-based band formed in 2013.

== Line up ==
The band consists of Eugenia Yip (vocals), Joshua Wan (keyboards), Jase Sng (bass) and Anson Koh (drums).

They have been invited to international jazz festivals and performed at the 2015 Southeast Asian Games closing ceremony.

== Origins of band name ==
The group relates their musical style of "anti-establishments escapism" to Steve McQueen's anti-hero persona.

== History ==
The Steve McQueens were formed in Singapore in 2013, with Yip as singer, Wan on keyboard, and Ben on bass, working at the Oriental Hotel as a jazz trio. Marcus Szeto then joined playing the guitar and Bobby Singh as percussionist. They did their first gig on 23 April 2013 at the Sultan Jazz Club. Jase (bassist) replaced Ben and Aaron (drummer) replaced Bobby, while Fabian Lim (saxophonist) joined the group.

The group played regular gigs at the BluJaz Café, Marina Bay Sands, and other venues. They were featured on Late Night at Esplanade – Theatres on the Bay in January 2014 for their launch of Einstein Moments, their first album, and in March 2014 at The Singapore Jazz Festival. They were spotted there by veteran jazz funk producer, Jean-Paul 'Bluey' Maunick, founder and leader of the British acid jazz band Incognito. Bluey invited them to his Livingston Studio to record their second album, Seamonster. This was the first release for Bluey's record label alongside David Ranalli, Julian Fontenell and Ravi Chidambaram, Splash Blue. The album was released in Asia by the Singapore-based label Foundation Music.

== International performances ==
Jakarta

- Java Jazz 2014
- Java Jazz 2015
- Java Jazz 2020

Japan

- Tokyo SUMMERSONIC 2015
- Tokyo Peter Barakan Live Magic!
- Tokyo International Jazz Festival 2018

Singapore

- Singapore International Jazz Festival 2014 and 2015

Korea

- Jarasum International Jazz Festival and Zandari Festa 2016

Australia

- Brisbane Arts Fest and Adelaide OzAsia Festival
- Melbourne Jazz Festival

== Other performances ==
- Opening for Incognito, O2 Indigo, London, 23 May 2015
- 2015 Southeast Asian Games closing ceremony, National Stadium, Singapore, 16 June 2015

== Discography ==
- Einstein Moments (2013)
- Sea Monster (2015)
- Terrarium (2017)
- Tape Ends (2020)
- The Observer (2022)
