= Cecilio & Kapono =

American musical duo from Hawaii

- Also known as: C&K
- Origin: Honolulu, Hawaii, U.S.
- Genres: Pop; Rock; World music
- Years active: 1973–1980; 1991-2000
- Labels: Columbia; Starbolt; C&K Hui; Moi; Paradise/Bluewater; HOC

Cecilio & Kapono were a Hawaiian pop music duo formed in 1973 by Henry Kapono Ka’aihue (known professionally as Henry Kapono, born September 21, 1948) and Cecilio David Rodriguez (born January 1945). The duo released three albums on Columbia Records: the self-titled Cecilio & Kapono (1974), Elua (1975), and Night Music (1977). To date, the duo has released more than a dozen full-length albums which have incorporated various genres including Top 40 pop, modern soul, funk, disco, rock, and traditional Hawaiian. Individually, the two artists have also released numerous solo recordings.

Cecilio & Kapono received the Hawai'i Academy of Recording Arts Lifetime Achievement Award for their work as a duo in 2009.

== Cecilio Rodriguez Sexual assault convictions ==
Rodriguez was convicted twice on sexual assault charges. In 1994, he pleaded no contest to "attempted sexual assault in the second degree". He was sentenced to one year in jail, 500 hours of community service, and sex offender treatment. The plea also involved deferred adjudication and a prohibition on jobs that would put him around children under 14 without an approved adult present. He served two days in jail.

In 2012, Rodriguez again pleaded no contest to sexual assault charges. In this case, he allegedly sexually molested two girls in 1996 and 1999. The girls were between 7 and 9 years old at the times of the alleged assaults. He was sentenced to one year in jail, five years of probation, and 52 weeks of sex offender counseling. If he violated his probation, he would have faced six years in prison. He was released after 4 months, spending 130 days in jail due to prison overcrowding.

== Selected discography ==
Year	Title	Record label (Cat #)
1974	Cecilio & Kapono	Columbia (32928)
1975	Elua	Columbia (33689)
1977	Night Music	Columbia (34300)
1979	Life's Different Now	Starbolt (001)
1992	Summerlust	C&K Hui (999)
1995	Goodtimes Together	Moi (7007)
1995	Together Live	Paradise/Bluewater (830)
1999	The Journey Continues	HOC (30521)

== See also ==
- Lomi-lomi salmon
