= Soft Space =

Studio album by The Jeff Lorber Fusion
- Released: 1978
- Recorded: 1978
- Studio: ABC Recording Studios (Hollywood, California); Ripcord Studios (Vancouver, Washington)
- Genre: Jazz fusion Smooth jazz Funk
- Length: 37:28
- Label: Inner City Records
- Producer: Jeff Lorber Marlon McClain

The Jeff Lorber Fusion chronology
| The Jeff Lorber Fusion (1977) | Soft Space (1978) | Water Sign (1979) |

Professional ratings
Review scores
| Source | Rating |
|---|---|
| Allmusic | 3/5 stars |
| The Rolling Stone Jazz Record Guide | 2/5 stars |
| DownBeat | 4/5 stars |

Soft Space is the second album by keyboardist Jeff Lorber as leader of his band The Jeff Lorber Fusion. Released in 1978, this album featured special guest artists Chick Corea and Joe Farrell. This was the group's last effort for Inner City Records before moving on to Arista Records the following year.

== Track listing ==
All tracks are written by Jeff Lorber.

Side one
| No. | Title | Length |
|---|---|---|
| 1. | "The Samba" | 5:13 |
| 2. | "Katherine" | 5:50 |
| 3. | "Black Ice" | 5:40 |

Side two
| No. | Title | Length |
|---|---|---|
| 1. | "Curtains" | 6:00 |
| 2. | "Proteus" | 4:42 |
| 3. | "Soft Space" | 4:05 |
| 4. | "Swing Funk" | 5:56 |

== Personnel ==
The Jeff Lorber Fusion

- Jeff Lorber – acoustic piano, Fender Rhodes, Moog synthesizer, Oberheim Four Voice
- Lester McFarland – electric bass
- Dennis Bradford – drums
- Terry Layne – flute, alto saxophone, tenor saxophone

Special guests

- Chick Corea – Minimoog solo (1), Minimoog (5)
- Joe Farrell – soprano saxophone (2), flute (3)

Additional musicians

- Dean Reichert – acoustic guitars, electric guitars
- Bruce Smith – congas, percussion
- Ron Young – congas, percussion

== Production ==
- Jeff Lorber – producer
- Marlon McClain – producer
- Dave Dixon – engineer
- Reggie Dozier – engineer
- Gilbert Kong – mastering at Masterdisk (New York City, New York)
- Mathew Cohen – cover design, cover artwork
- Leo Bliok – liner design
- Ancil Nance – photography

== Charts ==
| Chart (1978) | Peak position |
|---|---|
| Billboard Top Jazz Albums | 13 |
