= Frankie Biggz =

American record producer and musician

- Born: Francisco Andres Lucio; January 26, 1973 (age 53); Monroe, Michigan, U.S.
- Genres: Hip hop, R&B, house, rock, Latin, EDM, K-pop
- Occupations: Record producer, musician, singer, songwriter, DJ
- Years active: 1984–present
- Labels: Groovy Soup (1990–2005); Rama Music (2006–present)
- Spouse: IreneB (m. 2013)
- Website: frankiebiggz.com

Francisco Andres Lucio (born January 26, 1973), better known by his stage name Frankie Biggz, is an American Latin Grammy-winning record producer, musician, singer, songwriter, and DJ. He is widely recognized for his cross-genre production work spanning Latin, R&B, hip-hop, and electronic dance music (EDM). In the 2020s, he achieved further international prominence in the K-pop industry, notably serving as a record producer for Big Ocean, the world's first hard-of-hearing K-pop idol group.

Frankie Biggz's first credit production work was in 1990 on Miguel Tomas (Warner Bros., 1992) for his Latin-R&B singer and brother Miguel Tomas. After further productions and remixes on various 1990s R&B and Latino albums, Frankie Biggz became one of the most influential record producers for both Independent & Major artists.

Before working by himself, he released several Independent albums and remixes with fellow production partners Miguel Tomas (Brother) & Robert Hilliard under the Groovy Soup production group and label, in which the partners would later earn their first Gold Record (RIAA) under the Sony Music Latin Label for the Artist YURI for her record "Nueva Era".

He has collaborated as a record producer with numerous Latino & R&B artists, including Miguel Tomas, Elida y Avante, Stefani, Jay Perez, Adassa, Frankie Negron, Tito Nieves, Anais, WE, Wanessa Camargo, Juanes, & Oscar D'León.

== Biography ==
=== Early life (1973–1987) ===
Francisco Andres Lucio was born on January 26, 1973, in Monroe, Michigan, where he was raised by his parents Alicia & Rogelio Lucio (both Mexican and Native American descent) along with his two brothers, Miguel Tomas Lucio (Older) and Eduardo Joseph Lucio (Younger).

Frankie started showing his musicianship at a very early age, playing drums at a college level when he was only nine. It was then when he would start playing drums in his first band, Hit-n-Run, with his brother Miguel Tomas as a lead singer. The band toured around the US as an opening act of bands like Poison, Guns N' Roses & Ratt.

=== Production Beginnings (1988–1994) ===
At the age of 15, Frankie started showing interest in the production aspect of music, making hip hop tracks under the name "TMP" (The Mexican Prince) on a Roland S-50 keyboard. While in high school, and thanks to mentor Eric Morgenson of Studio A in Dearborn Heights, MI ("Ready for the World", "Nena", etc.), Frankie and his brother Miguel Tomas would start a long-term collaboration with different producers and musicians around the world (including production & writing ensemble brothers Mario Resto & Luis Resto, known for their work with Eminem).

Not long after, both brothers would have their first commercial success when Miguel Tomas was signed to Warner Bros. Records and released his first album, Miguel Tomas, which also featured Gospel producer Fred Hammond and hip hop legends Bass Brothers, who would later discover Eminem.

=== Texas and Commercial Breakthrough (1994–1995) ===
Once Frankie had established his residence in San Antonio, him, Stephanie Lynn and her group High NRG joined forces to begin working on Stephanie's second EMI album release, Ojos Para Ti (1994).

During his short stay in San Antonio Frankie Biggz began receiving recognition as a songwriter, musician, producer and drummer. He worked as a producer on a number of Tejano projects with Capital EMI & Sony Discos, and Stefani's Todo Mi Amor (Sony Music Distribution, 1995), both earning Gold and Platinum records.

As far as his job as a drummer, he was part of the branding irons stable of Capital EMI known as "The Six Pack" crew, along with Selena, Emilio Navara, Grupo Mas, Jay Perez and Ram Herrera. During his tours he shared stage with Latin international artists such as Luis Miguel, Paulina Rubio, Los Tigres del Norte & male vocal group The Barrio Boyzz.

=== Back to Detroit and Major Records (1996–2006) ===
After his decision to come back to Detroit to further his non-Latin success, Frankie Biggz produced & remixed songs by several major international artists, including Gansta Rhyme Mistro's "The Ghetto", Eminem's "Without Me (Remix)" & "Renegade (Remix)", Christina Aguilera's "Come on Over (Remix)", 50 Cent's "In Da Club (Reggaeton Remix)", Kanye West's "Gold Digger" (Reggaeton Remix)", as well as tracking work associated with acts like Mariah Carey and Britney Spears.

During this period, he also was signed to Talent Beach Music/Universal Music as a Hip Hop artist in the group called BNW, eventually releasing the first single & MTV video "Nena" to BNW's LP entitled "The Difference", which he also produced and co-wrote.

Biggz's BNW European tour was slated for November 2006, but the tour was delayed and eventually canceled along with the record deal after BNW front man Wahero suddenly quit the group in late 2007 for personal reasons unknown. It was a commercial & career disappointment. The loss of Wahero deeply affected Frankie Biggz. In a phone interview in late 2007 with 92.5 Kiss FM for a BNW interview, Frankie Biggz said:

He was my Cuban link, and I was his "Brother Bear". Together we had this musical chemistry that will be forever unmatched. I lost a good friend and I don't know why, because beyond the music, he was brilliant, the most talented person I had ever met and worked with. My heart is broken.

— Frankie Biggz, 92.5 Kiss FM

=== Rama Music LLC, Tempo Music Studio and International Speaking (2007–2019) ===
==== Rama Music LLC ====
In the middle of 2007, Frankie Biggz partnered with Carlos Valderrama to revamp the dance and house label Rama Music, expanding it into a full record label and digital distribution service holding a vast catalog of independent digital media circulation under global distribution networks.

==== Latin Grammy Milestone ====
In 2007, Frankie Biggz achieved a major industry milestone at the 8th Annual Latin Grammy Awards. He won a collective Latin Grammy Award for Best Contemporary Tropical Album for his comprehensive production and piano programming contributions to legendary salsa artist Oscar D'León's Sony Latin album, Fuzionando.

==== Institute of the Arts Barcelona ====
From 2015 to 2018, Biggz expanded his professional activities into academia, serving as a lecturer and staff member at the Institute of the Arts Barcelona (IAB) in Spain, instructing emerging international students on music production, recording arts, and commercial music creation models.

==== Panels and Music Technology ====
Alongside his studio career, Biggz established himself as an industry consultant and public speaker, regularly delivering industry panels on global digital distribution models and music business trends at high-profile international electronic music gatherings, including the Amsterdam Dance Event (ADE) and the Miami Music Conference.

=== Digital Media and K-pop Production (2020s–present) ===
In the 2020s, Biggz transitioned a significant portion of his career to digital media, technical analysis, and collaborations within the South Korean music industry. Through his official YouTube platform, The Frankie Biggz Show (@frankiebiggz), he established a prominent presence by conducting professional production breakdowns, focusing heavily on K-pop and other Asian musical acts. His content regularly features industry-focused commentary, technical reviews, and high-profile interviews with global songwriters and performers, such as Grammy Award winning songwriter Nate Walka, hip hop pioneer Kurtis Blow or legendary actor and comedian Tommy Davidson.

In July 2025, Biggz's production background and analysis of the genre led to an official spotlight feature with Korea.net centered around Suga of BTS. In the interview, Biggz provided extensive musical analysis on Suga's dual nature as a pioneer artist-producer who successfully implements genre-bending sounds and visual elements to unite global audiences.

==== Collaborations with Big Ocean ====
As a hearing-impaired music professional, Biggz became a close creative partner for the South Korean musical trio Big Ocean, celebrated as the world's first hard-of-hearing K-pop idol group. Biggz served as a key writer for the group's third mini-album, THE GREATEST BATTLE, released in early 2026 under Parastar Entertainment. He specifically wrote the lyric for leading track "One Man Army," a pop-punk and hip-hop influenced anthem. The members of Big Ocean publicly noted that the song's prominent lyric, "Cause I've always been beaten, but never defeated," was directly inspired by Biggz's own life philosophy as a deaf producer working in the music industry.

In May 2026, Biggz continued his role as the group's primary producer by helming their digital follow-up single, "Make it up to you," released on major music streaming platforms. Rooted in 1970s disco-funk and city pop elements, the track was co-written by the band members to express gratitude towards global fans after the unexpected postponement of their European tour.

=== Other Achievements and Collaborations ===
==== Jeff Lorber: Now Is The Time (2010) ====
In late 2008, Frankie Biggz contacted EMI for a sample clearance of Jeff Lorber's "Rain Dance" (known for his use by Lil' Kim in her hit "Crush", featuring Lil Cesar & Notorious B.I.G.), that he had used for IreneB's song "I Wanna Fly" (included in "Metamorphosis"). Not long after, legendary jazz keyboard player Jeff Lorber reached out to IreneB & Frankie Biggz to congratulate them for their work. After several conversations between the three, Jeff Lorber and producer Bobby Colomby invited them to participate in his upcoming LP Now Is the Time. Frankie Biggz co-wrote with IreneB & Jeff Lorber four songs: "Rain Dance/Wanna Fly", "Sugar Free", "Water Sign" & "Curtains/Before We Go", that IreneB performed in the album. On June 1, 2010, "Now Is The Time" was released under Heads Up International record label. Produced by Bobby Colomby and Jeff Lorber and with guest appearances by Dave Weckl, Vinnie Colaiuta, Paul Jackson, Jr., Eric Marienthal & Jimmy Haslip. The album reached #8 on the Billboard Jazz Album charts. On December 1, 2010, "Now Is The Time" was nominated for a Grammy in the Best Contemporary Jazz Album category.

=== Personal life ===
Frankie Biggz has been married to Spanish R&B artist and music executive IreneB (Irene Bauza) since 2013. He has two sons from previous relationships, Marcus "Rome" Lucio and Luis Lucio. They reside in Barcelona, Spain.
