= The Weather Channel Presents: Smooth Jazz II =

Compilation album by Various artists
- Released: June 10, 2008
- Genre: Smooth jazz
- Label: Midas

The Weather Channel chronology
The Weather Channel Presents: The Best of Smooth Jazz (2007)	The Weather Channel Presents: Smooth Jazz II (2008)	The Weather Channel Presents: Winter Wonderland (2008)

The Weather Channel Presents: Smooth Jazz II is a 2008 compilation by Midas Records. It was the second album from the Weather Channel and included their most requested music from the Local on the 8s segments. It peaked at No. 9 on Billboard's Top Contemporary Jazz charts in the same year.

== Track listing ==
1. "Brave New World" – Russ Freeman & The Rippingtons (from the 1996 album Brave New World)
2. "Pacific Coast Highway" – Jeff Lorber (from the 1996 album State of Grace)
3. "Wade in the Water" – Ramsey Lewis Trio (from the 1966 album Wade in the Water)
4. "Friday's Child" – Bradley Joseph (from the 1994 album Hear the Masses)
5. "La Salsa En Mi" – Bernie Williams (from the 2003 album The Journey Within)
6. "Cast Your Fate to the Wind" – David Benoit (from the 1989 album Waiting for Spring)
7. "Breakfast at Igor's" – Spyro Gyra (from the 1993 album Dreams Beyond Control)
8. "Lydian" – Norman Brown (from the 1994 album After the Storm)
9. "Restless Heart" – Chris Geith (from the 2007 album Timeless World)
10. "Rainbow Seeker" – Joe Sample (from the 1978 album Rainbow Seeker)
11. "Now's the Time" – Charlie Parker Quartet (from the collection set Charlie Parker: The Complete Savoy Sessions)
12. "Big Country" – Eric Marienthal (from the 1991 album Oasis)

== See also ==
- The Weather Channel Presents: The Best of Smooth Jazz
