= GRP All-Star Big Band (album) =

Studio album by the GRP All-Star Big Band
- Released: 1992
- Recorded: January 12, 1992
- Studio: Ocean Way Recording (Los Angeles, California)
- Genre: Jazz; big band
- Length: 71:56
- Label: GRP
- Producer: Dave Grusin, Larry Rosen

GRP All-Star Big Band chronology
GRP All-Star Big Band (1992)	Dave Grusin Presents GRP All-Star Big Band Live! (1993)

Professional ratings
Review scores
Source	Rating
AllMusic	4/5 stars

GRP All-Star Big Band is a jazz album by the big band of the same name. The album was nominated for the Best Large Jazz Ensemble Recording at the 35th Annual Grammy Awards.

The band was assembled in celebration for the tenth anniversary of GRP Records and featured the top musicians of the label. The album itself was recorded and mixed over a two day session and filmed for the accompanying video directed by Ed Libonati.

== Track listing ==
No.	Title	Writer(s)	Length
1.	"Airegin"	Sonny Rollins	5:14
2.	"Blue Train"	John Coltrane	4:39
3.	"Donna Lee"	Charlie Parker	4:18
4.	"Maiden Voyage"	Herbie Hancock	6:37
5.	"Sister Sadie"	Horace Silver	6:54
6.	"The Sidewinder"	Lee Morgan	6:43
7.	"Seven Steps To Heaven"	Miles Davis, Victor Feldman	6:03
8.	"I Remember Clifford" (CD bonus track)	Benny Golson	5:36
9.	"Footprints" (CD bonus track)	Wayne Shorter	6:58
10.	"Manteca"	Dizzy Gillespie	7:00
11.	"'Round Midnight"	Thelonious Monk	7:04
12.	"Spain"	Chick Corea, Joaquín Rodrigo	5:19

== Personnel ==
Horn Section

- Dave Valentin – flute (10, 12), flute solo (10, 12)
- Eddie Daniels – clarinet (3, 4), clarinet solo (3, 4)
- Ernie Watts – flute, saxophones, tenor saxophone solo (1, 11)
- Tom Scott – flute, saxophones, alto saxophone solo (1), tenor saxophone solo (6)
- Nelson Rangell – flutes, saxophones, alto saxophone solo (2), piccolo flute solo (3)
- Bob Mintzer – flute, bass clarinet, saxophones, tenor saxophone solo (2), baritone clarinet (4)
- Eric Marienthal – flute, saxophones, alto saxophone solo (4)
- Arturo Sandoval – trumpet, flugelhorn, trumpet solo (8, 10)
- Sal Marquez – trumpet, flugelhorn, trumpet solo (7, 9)
- Randy Brecker – trumpet, flugelhorn, trumpet solo (6, 10)
- George Bohanon – trombone, trombone solo (2, 5)

Rhythm Section

- Russell Ferrante – acoustic piano (1, 2), acoustic piano solo (1, 2)
- Dave Grusin – acoustic piano (3, 4, 11), acoustic piano solo (4, 11)
- Kenny Kirkland – acoustic piano (5, 7, 10, 12), acoustic piano solo (5, 10)
- David Benoit – acoustic piano (6, 8, 9), acoustic piano solo (8, 9)
- Gary Burton – vibraphone (3, 11), vibraphone solo (3, 11)
- Lee Ritenour – guitar (9, 12), electric guitar solo (9, 12)
- John Patitucci – bass, bass solo (5)
- Dave Weckl – drums, drums solo (6, 7, 10)
- Alex Acuña – percussion (4, 6, 9, 10, 12), percussion solo (6, 10)

Arrangements

- Michael Abene (1, 5)
- Tom Scott (2, 3)
- Dave Grusin (4)
- David Benoit (5, 8)
- Russell Ferrante (7)
- Bob Mintzer (9, 10)
- Vince Mendoza (11)
- Chick Corea (12)

Orchestrations

- Peter Sprague (12)

Production

- Michael Abene - producer
- Gretchen Hoffman Abene - associate producer
- Dave Grusin - executive producer
- Larry Rosen - executive producer
- Don Murray - engineer
- Dan Bosworth, Eric Rudd - assistant engineer recording
- Elaine Anderson - assistant engineer, mixing
- Terry Rieff - assistant engineer, mixing
- Ted Jensen - mastering
- Wally Traugott - assistant engineer, mastering
- Zan Stevens - liner notes
- Harrison Funk - photography
- Andy Ruggirello - design
- Dan Serrano - design
- David Gibb - design
- Sonny Mediana - design
- Michael Landy - editor
- Joseph Doughney - assistant editor
