= Dave Grusin Presents GRP All-Star Big Band Live! =

Live album by GRP All-Star Big Band
- Released: October 5, 1993
- Recorded: January 31, 1993
- Venue: Gotanda Kan-i Hoken Hall, Tokyo
- Genre: Jazz, jazz fusion
- Length: 63:51
- Label: GRP
- Producer: Dave Grusin, Larry Rosen, Michael Abene, Gretchen Hoffmann Abene

GRP All-Star Big Band chronology
GRP All-Star Big Band (1992)	Dave Grusin Presents GRP All-Star Big Band Live! (1993)	All Blues (1995)

Professional ratings
Review scores
Source	Rating
Allmusic	4.5/5 stars

Dave Grusin Presents GRP All-Star Big Band Live! is a jazz album by the GRP All-Star Big Band.

== Track listing ==
No.	Title	Writer(s)	Length
1.	"Oleo"	Sonny Rollins	7:39
2.	"My Man's Gone Now"	George Gershwin	7:05
3.	"Sing, Sing, Sing"	Louis Prima	6:58
4.	"Manteca"	Dizzy Gillespie	7:33
5.	"Blues for Howard"	Dave Grusin	8:31
6.	"Cherokee"	Ray Noble	5:10
7.	"Blue Train"	John Coltrane	4:43
8.	"'S Wonderful"	George Gershwin, Ira Gershwin	6:31
9.	"Sister Sadie"	Horace Silver	7:00
10.	"GRP Band Introduction"		2:41

== Personnel ==
- Dave Grusin – piano
- John Patitucci – bass
- Dave Weckl – drums
- Gary Burton – vibraphone
- Tom Scott – conductor, soprano, tenor & baritone sax
- Eric Marienthal – soprano & alto saxophones
- Nelson Rangell – soprano & alto saxophones, flute
- Bob Mintzer – soprano & tenor saxophones, bass clarinet
- Ernie Watts – soprano & tenor saxophones
- Arturo Sandoval –trumpet, flugelhorn
- Chuck Findley – trumpet, flugelhorn
- Randy Brecker – trumpet, flugelhorn
- Byron Stripling – trumpet, flugelhorn
- George Bohanon – trombone
- Phillip Bent – flute
- Eddie Daniels – clarinet
- Russell Ferrante – piano
- Gary Lindsay – arranger

=== Technical personnel ===
- Keiichi Yamada – assistant engineer
- Yasuhisa Yoneda – photography
- Katsuya Koike – photography
- Hiroshi Aono – production coordination
- Wally Traugott – mastering
- Dan Serrano – art direction
- Scott Johnson – art direction
- Darren Mora – assistant engineer, mixing
- Bernie Kirsh – engineer, mixing
- Geoff Mayfield – liner notes
- Michael Landy – post-production
- Joseph Doughney – post-production
- Diane Dragonette – assistant coordinator, production coordination
- Alba Acevedo – design
