= Sister Sadie =

Composition by Horace Silver

from the album Blowin' the Blues Away
- Written: 1959
- Released: Early November 1959
- Recorded: August 30, 1959
- Genre: Jazz
- Label: Blue Note
- Composer: Horace Silver

"Sister Sadie" is a jazz standard written by pianist Horace Silver in 1959 and first recorded for his Blue Note Records album Blowin' the Blues Away, that same year. In 1961, Silver commented on Hank Crawford's version presented on the album More Soul: "They did this a little faster than I intended, but then that's their interpretation – the way they hear it [...] it's more of a blues-band-type interpretation". Silver reported, "I didn't know a girl named Sadie. I just wrote it, and that title came to mind."

== Notable cover versions ==
- 1960: Hank Crawford, More Soul (Atlantic)
- 1960: Gil Evans, Out of the Cool (Impulse!)
- 1961: Andy and the Bey Sisters, Andy and the Bey Sisters (RCA Victor)
- 1961: Ray Charles, Genius + Soul = Jazz (Impulse!)
- 1961: Shirley Scott, Shirley Scott Plays Horace Silver (Prestige)
- 1961: James Moody, Cookin' the Blues (Argo)
- 1963 Les McCann, Soul Hits (Pacific Jazz)
- 1963: Woody Herman, Woody Herman–1963 (Philips)
- 1966: Buddy Rich, Swingin' New Big Band (Pacific Jazz)
- 1975: Ray Charles, My Kind of Jazz Part 3 (Crossover)
- 1975: Rahsaan Roland Kirk, Dog Years in the Fourth Ring (32 Jazz) – released 1997
- 1991: Maceo Parker, Mo' Roots (Verve)
- 1992: Joe Pass, In Hamburg (ACT Music)
- 1992: Joey DeFrancesco, Reboppin′ (Columbia)
- 1992: GRP All-Star Big Band, GRP All-Star Big Band (GRP)
- 1993: Dee Dee Bridgewater, Keeping Tradition (Verve)
- 1993: GRP All-Star Big Band, Dave Grusin Presents GRP All-Star Big Band Live! (GRP)

== See also ==
- List of post-1950 jazz standards
