= Water Sign (Jeff Lorber album) =

Studio album by The Jeff Lorber Fusion
- Released: 1979
- Recorded: 1979
- Studio: Devonshire Sound Studios (North Hollywood, California); Ripcord Studios (Vancouver, Washington)
- Genre: Jazz fusion Smooth jazz Funk
- Length: 42:29
- Label: Arista
- Producer: Jeff Lorber Marlon McClain

The Jeff Lorber Fusion chronology
Soft Space (1978)	Water Sign (1979)	Wizard Island (1980)

Professional ratings
Review scores
Source	Rating
Allmusic	3/5 stars
The Rolling Stone Jazz Record Guide	3/5 stars

Water Sign is the third album by keyboardist Jeff Lorber as leader of his band "The Jeff Lorber Fusion". Released in 1979, this was Lorber's first album on Arista Records.

The backing track for the song "Rain Dance" has been sampled most notably for the 1997 Lil' Kim song "Crush on You", but also for the 1996 Tha Dogg Pound holiday song "I Wish," the 1997 SWV song "Love Like This", the 2013 Ariana Grande song "Right There" and the 2018 Mariah Carey song "A No No", from Caution. Lorber re-recorded the song, this time with vocals by Irene Bauza, as the song "Rain Dance/Wanna Fly" on his 2010 album Now Is the Time.

The song Toad's Place was written during a sound check at the nightclub Toad's Place and performed that night. It has been featured on The Weather Channel's Local On The 8s segments.

== Track listing ==
All tracks are written by Jeff Lorber.

Side one
No.	Title	Length
1.	"Toad's Place"	5:35
2.	"Country"	5:41
3.	"Tune 88"	4:28
4.	"Sparkle"	4:26

Side two
No.	Title	Length
1.	"Water Sign"	5:21
2.	"Rain Dance"	4:40
3.	"Right Here"	5:23
4.	"Lights Out"	6:41

== Personnel ==
The Jeff Lorber Fusion

- Jeff Lorber – Fender Rhodes, Yamaha electric grand piano, ARP 2600, Minimoog, Oberheim Four Voice, Prophet-5
- Danny Wilson – electric bass
- Dennis Bradford – drums

Guest Musicians

- Jay Koder – jazz guitar, acoustic guitar, guitar solo (7)
- Doug Lewis – "funky" guitar
- Bruce Smith – percussion
- Dennis Springer – soprano saxophone, tenor saxophone
- Joe Farrell – flute
- Freddie Hubbard – flugelhorn

== Production ==
- Jeff Lorber – producer
- Marlon McClain – associate producer
- Dave Dixon – engineer, mixing
- Jerry Hudgins – engineer, mixing
- John Golden – mastering at Kendun Recorders (Burbank, CA).
- Jeffrey Ross – production coordinator, management
- Trevor Brown – photography

== Charts ==
Chart (1979)	Peak position
Billboard Top LPs & Tape	119
Billboard Top Jazz Albums	4
