= It's a Fact =

Studio album by Jeff Lorber
- Released: May 21, 1982
- Recorded: September 27, 1981 – January 10, 1982
- Studios: Indigo Ranch Studios, Malibu, California
- Genres: Smooth jazz, jazz fusion
- Length: 37:40
- Label: Arista
- Producer: Jeff Lorber

Jeff Lorber chronology
Galaxian (1981)	It's a Fact (1982)	In the Heat of the Night (1984)

Singles from It's a Fact
- 1. "Full Moon" Released: 1982

It's a Fact is the first solo album by jazz musician Jeff Lorber.

Professional ratings
Review scores
Source	Rating
Allmusic	3/5 stars
The Rolling Stone Jazz Record Guide	2/5 stars

== Track listing ==
Side one
No.	Title	Writer(s)	Vocalist	Length
1.	"Tierra Verde"	Lorber, Gorelick		4:35
2.	"Full Moon"	Lorber, McClain, Browne	Arnold McCuller, Greg Walker	4:54
3.	"Warm Springs"	Lorber		4:28
4.	"It's a Fact"	Lorber, Ericksen	Greg Walker	4:12

Side two
No.	Title	Writer(s)	Vocalist	Length
5.	"The Magician"	Lorber, Gorelick		3:59
6.	"Your Love Has Got Me"	Lorber, Ericksen	Arnold McCuller, Sylvia St. James	4:00
7.	"Delevans"	Lorber		4:04
8.	"Always There"	Laws, Jeffrey		4:30
9.	"Above the Clouds"	Lorber		2:57

== Personnel ==
- Jeff Lorber – keyboards, Steinway grand piano, Fender Rhodes, Rhodes EK-10, clavinet, Oberheim OB-X, Prophet-10, Minimoog, Moog Modular System, Moog Liberation, Linn LM-1, string arrangements (1)
- Marlon McClain – guitar solo (5, 8)
- Pat Kelly – guitar solo (7)
- Nathan East – electric bass
- John Robinson – drums (1)
- Paulinho da Costa – percussion
- Kenny Gorelick – soprano saxophone, tenor saxophone, flute, sax solos
- Tom Browne – trumpet (2, 5), flugelhorn (2, 5)
- George Del Barrio – horn and string arrangements (4, 6)
- Pete Christlieb – horn conductor (4, 6)
- Lynn Davis – backing vocals
- Sylvia St. James – backing vocals, lead vocals (6)
- Arnold McCuller – lead vocals (2, 6)
- Greg Walker – lead vocals (2)

== Production ==
- Jeff Lorber – producer
- Chris Brunt – associate producer, recording, mixing
- Dennis Hansen – assistant engineer
- Ken Perry – mastering at Capitol Mastering (Hollywood, California).
- Ria Lewerke-Shapiro – art direction
- Sue Reilly – design
- Aaron Rapoport – photography
- Jeffrey Ross Music – management

== Charts ==
Chart (1982)	Peak position
Billboard Pop Albums	73
Billboard Top Soul Albums	44
Billboard Top Jazz Albums	4
