= Magical Elements =

Studio album by Dry Jack
- Released: July 1979
- Recorded: October 1978
- Studio: RPM Studios, New York, NY
- Genre: Jazz fusion
- Length: 43:30
- Label: Inner City
- Producer: Aimee Chiariello and Dry Jack

Dry Jack chronology
Magical Elements (1979)	Whale City (1979)

Professional ratings
Review scores
Source	Rating
Allmusic	3/5 stars

Magical Elements is Dry Jack's debut album, released in July 1979 by Inner City Records. It was recorded in October 1978 at RPM Studios in New York City. Magical Elements was reissued on CD in 2008.

== Track listing ==
All songs written and composed by Chuck Lamb, except "Earth Daze" by Chuck Lamb and Rod Fleeman.

1. Americana Hoedown – 4:32
2. Lit Spinners – 3:15
3. Laurel's Dream – 6:40
4. Magical Elements – 6:30
5. Sunday Boogie-Nookie Stomp – 6:40
6. Strollin' On Jupiter – 5:15
7. Earth Daze – 9:16

== Personnel ==
- Chuck Lamb – keyboards, piano
- Rich Lamb – bass
- Rod Fleeman – guitar
- Jon Margolis – drums, percussion

== Production ==
- Produced by Aimee Chiariello and Dry Jack
- Mike Barbiero: Engineering
- Mark Friedman, Ed Small: Assistant engineers
- Bob Ludwig: Mastering
