= Now Is the Time (Jeff Lorber Fusion album) =

2010 studio album by Jeff Lorber Fusion

Studio album by Jeff Lorber Fusion
- Released: June 1, 2010
- Studio: JHL Sound (Pacific Palisades, California)
- Genre: Jazz
- Length: 47:27
- Label: Heads Up
- Producer: Jeff Lorber; Bobby Colomby; Jimmy Haslip

Jeff Lorber Fusion chronology
Galaxian (1981)	Now Is the Time (2010)	Galaxy (2012)

Jeff Lorber chronology
Heard That (2008)	Now Is the Time (2010)

Now Is the Time is a jazz album released by Jeff Lorber Fusion. The album was released in 2010 on Heads Up Records and was produced by Jeff Lorber, Bobby Colomby, and Jimmy Haslip. It was nominated for the 2011 Grammy Award for Best Contemporary Jazz Album.

== Overview ==
Now Is the Time is the first Jeff Lorber album billed as a Jeff Lorber Fusion release since 1981's Galaxian.

We all had a vision of what we wanted this record to be. We wanted a return to the sound of the Jeff Lorber Fusion, but informed by everything I’ve learned since then. This record is a clear statement. It represents a real musical shift toward something a little jazzier, and a little more exciting. The title has a very positive thrust to it, and it evokes a certain sense of being serious and taking charge.

— Jeff Lorber

This version of The Fusion includes Lorber on Fender Rhodes electric piano, Hammond B-3 organ, and acoustic piano with bassist Jimmy Haslip, saxophonist Eric Marienthal, guitarist Paul Jackson, Jr., trumpeter Randy Brecker, and drummers Vinnie Colaiuta and Dave Weckl. The album also features the Blood, Sweat & Tears horn section, Tom Timko, Steve Jankowski, Jens Wendelboe, and Teddy Mulet, on two tracks, "Pixel" and "Sumatra" and vocalist IreneB on four tracks, "Water Sign", "Rain Dance/Wanna Fly", "Sugar Free", and "Curtains/Before We Go".

The album was nominated for the 2011 Grammy Award for Best Contemporary Jazz Album but lost to the Stanley Clarke album The Stanley Clarke Band. The other nominees were Never Can Say Goodbye by Joey DeFrancesco, To the One by John McLaughlin, and Backatown by Trombone Shorty.

== Tracks ==
The opening track, "Rain Dance/Wanna Fly", is one of several new versions of old Jeff Lorber Fusion tracks, this one was originally on the 1979 album Water Sign. The original, an instrumental, has been sampled by Lil' Kim on "Crush on You". This version has lyrics written and sung by IreneB. George Benson's touring drummer, Lil' John Roberts, plays on the album's second track, "Dr. Moy". "Pixel" was penned by Lorber along with Bobby Colomby from Blood, Sweat & Tears and Jimmy Haslip from the Yellowjackets and features the Blood, Sweat & Tears horn section. "Sugar Free" features IreneB on vocals.

"Mysterious Traveller" is a new arrangement of the Wayne Shorter penned song from the 1974 Weather Report album of the same name. This version highlights saxophonist Eric Marienthal. "Curtains/Before We Go" is a new version of another old Jeff Lorber Fusion track that has been sampled by Nelly on "Pimp Juice". This ballad features IreneB on vocals.

"Black Ice", a remake from the 1978 album Soft Space, is highlighted with a Jimmy Haslip bass solo. "Las Rosas" is another track co-written by Colomby and features Lorber on piano. "Chinese Medicinal Herbs" is new version of old Jeff Lorber Fusion track from their first release. "Water Sign" is another track that was previously released as an instrumental that has been updated with lyrics by IreneB. The album's closing track, "Sumatra", features the Blood, Sweat & Tears horn section.

== Reception ==
Reviewer Howard Dukes called Now Is the Time a "listener's album" "with its radio friendly R&B songs and instrumentals that cover the scope of electrified jazz". He also commented that it is "refreshing to see how Lorber is willing to kick up the jazz quotient on [these] R&B influenced tunes".

Professional ratings
Now Is the Time
Review scores
Source	Rating
Allmusic	4/5 stars

In All About Jazz, Eugene Holley, Jr. writes how the musicians "serve up a pleasing disc". Also from All About Jazz, James Nadal calls the music "easy on the ears and accessible to a broad audience". He comments how the album "offers a variation of tempos" and that the songs "[flow] seamlessly from one to the next".

Marvin Leon Lake, of The Virginian-Pilot calls the album "a successful endeavor" that "captures the improvisational energy of fusion, while infusing more jazz and R&B into Lorber’s tunes". In Allmusic, Alex Henderson wrote that the album is not "the work of a jazz purist or a bop snob, but...has a jazz improviser's mentality" and called it "a fine album".

== Track listing ==
1. "Rain Dance/Wanna Fly" (Irene Bauza, Frankie Biggz, Jeff Lorber) - 5:23
2. "Dr. Moy" (Bobby Colomby, Steve Dubin, Lorber) - 4:22
3. "Pixel" (Colomby, Jimmy Haslip, Lorber) - 4:13
4. "Sugar Free" (Bauza, Biggz, Lorber) - 4:00
5. "Mysterious Traveller" (Wayne Shorter) - 3:56
6. "Curtains/Before We Go" (Bauza, Biggz, Lorber) - 4:55
7. "Black Ice" (Lorber) - 4:17
8. "Las Rosas" (Colomby, Lorber) - 3:07
9. "Chinese Medicinal Herbs" (Lorber) - 4:49
10. "Water Sign" (Bauza, Biggz, Lorber) - 4:24
11. "Sumatra" (Lorber) - 4:11

== Personnel ==
- Jeff Lorber – all keyboards, guitars (2, 8), synth bass (4, 11)
- Larry Koonse – guitars
- Paul Jackson, Jr. – guitars (1, 3, 4, 7, 10)
- Tony Maiden – guitars (2)
- Michael Thompson – guitars (5, 6, 8)
- Jimmy Haslip – bass (1, 3-11), percussion (5)
- Alex Al – bass (2)
- Vinnie Colaiuta – drums (1, 3-5, 7, 8, 10)
- Lil' John Roberts – drums (2)
- Dave Weckl – drums (9)
- Jimmy Branly – percussion (1, 5, 7, 9), drums (6, 11)
- Lenny Castro – percussion (2)
- Tom Timko – saxophone (1, 3, 11), flute (9)
- Eric Marienthal – alto saxophone (2, 3, 11), soprano saxophone (5, 7-9), tenor saxophone (6, 10)
- Jens Wendelboe – trombone (1, 3, 11)
- Randy Brecker – flugelhorn (1)
- Steve Jankowski – trumpet (1, 3, 11), flugelhorn (9)
- Teddy Mulet – lead trumpet (1, 3, 11)
- Tower of PowerDavid Mann – horns (4), horn arrangements (4)
- Jerry Hey – horn arrangements (1, 3, 11)
- Irene B – vocals (1, 4, 6, 10)
- Frankie Biggz – backing vocals (1)

== Production ==
- Jeff Lorber – producer, engineer
- Jimmy Haslip – producer
- Bobby Colomby – producer
- Ada Rovatti – engineer
- Derek Jones – drum engineer
- Frankie Biggz – vocal recording
- Allen Sides – mixing at Ocean Way Recording (Hollywood, California).
- Chris Bellman – mastering at Bernie Grundman Mastering (Hollywood, California).
- Lori Stoll – photography
- Janet Wolsborn – package design

== Charts ==
=== Album charts ===
Year	Chart	Peak position
2010	Billboard Jazz Albums	8

=== Single charts ===
Year	Song	Cart	Peak position
2010	"Pixel"	Billboard Smooth Jazz Songs	4
