= Phillip Bent =

- Born: 16 September 1964 (age 61); London, England
- Genres: Jazz
- Occupation: Musician
- Instrument: Flute
- Years active: 1980s–present
- Label: GRP

Phillip Bent (born 16 September 1964) is an English jazz flautist from London, England, who was a member of the GRP All-Star Big Band. He has made references to a number of musicians as his inspiration, including Bobbi Humphrey, James Newton, Kathryn Lukas (his teacher), William Bennett, and James Galway.

== Discography ==
=== As leader ===
- The Pressure (1993)
- The Magic of Your Spell (2007)

=== As sideman ===
With GRP All-Star Big Band

- GRP All-Star Big Band (1992)
- Dave Grusin Presents GRP All-Star Big Band Live! (1993)
- All Blues (1995)

With others

- Jazz Warriors, Out of Many, One People (1987)
- Ronny Jordan, The Antidote (1992)
- Galliano, A Joyful Noise Unto The Creator (1992)
- The Prodigy, Music for the Jilted Generation (1994)
- Des'ree, Endangered Species (2000)
