= Walk Tall (album) =

Studio album by Eric Marienthal
- Released: September 22, 1998
- Recorded: 1998
- Genre: Jazz
- Length: 55:57
- Label: Verve
- Producer: Harvey Mason

Eric Marienthal chronology
Easy Street (1997)	Walk Tall (1998)	Turn Up the Heat (2001)

Walk Tall is an album by American saxophonist Eric Marienthal released in 1998, and recorded for the Verve label. It is Marienthal's tribute to the music of Cannonball Adderley. The album reached No. 13 on the Billboard Contemporary Jazz chart.

== Track listing ==
1. Mercy, Mercy, Mercy (Joe Zawinul) – 5:24
2. Work Song (Nat Adderley/Oscar Brown) – 4:24
3. Walk Tall (Zawinul/Jim Rein/Queen Esther Marrow) – 4:40
4. Skylark (Hoagy Carmichael/Johnny Mercer) – 3:31
5. Imagine That (Eric Marienthal/Rob Mullins) – 4:34
6. The Way You Look Tonight (Jerome Kern/Dorothy Fields) – 5:30
7. Here in My Heart (Mullins) – 4:37
8. Sunstone (Russell Ferrante) – 4:23
9. If You Need Me To (Harvey Mason) – 3:31
10. Country Preacher (Zawinul) – 5:29
11. Unit 7 (Sam Jones) – 5:01
12. Groove Runner (Jeff Lorber/Marienthal) – 4:13

== Personnel ==
- Eric Marienthal – saxophone
- Chris Botti – trumpet
- Chuck Findley – trumpet
- John Beasley – keyboards
- Russell Ferrante – keyboards
- Ronnie Foster – keyboards
- Rob Mullins – keyboards
- Stanley Clarke – bass
- Melvin Davis – bass guitar
- Chuck Domanico – bass guitar, double bass
- Reggie Hamilton – bass guitar
- Allen Hinds – guitar
- Lee Ritenour – guitar
- Michael Thompson – guitar
- Michael Mishaw – background vocals (8)
- Kevyn Lettau – background vocals (8)

== Charts ==
Chart (1998)	Peak position
US Top Jazz Albums (Billboard)	16
US Top Contemporary Jazz Albums (Billboard)	13
