= Whale City =

Studio album by Dry Jack
- Released: 1979
- Recorded: July 1979
- Studio: Secret Sound Studios, New York, NY
- Genre: Jazz fusion
- Length: 43:52
- Label: Inner City
- Producer: Dry Jack

Dry Jack chronology
Magical Elements (1979)	Whale City (1979)

Professional ratings
Review scores
Source	Rating
Allmusic	3/5 stars

Whale City is Dry Jack's second album, released in 1979 by Inner City Records as IC 1075. It was recorded in July 1979 at Secret Sound Studios in New York City. Whale City was reissued on CD on August 17, 2010.

== Track listing ==
All songs written and composed by Chuck Lamb, except "Butch and Bruce Go Under the Sea" by Chuck Lamb and Rick Lamb. All compositions published by Ramapo Publishing Company/BMI.

1. Hammerhead – 6:10
2. Heads in the Cloud – 6:38
3. Neener Nawner part one – 3:22
4. Neener Nawner part two – 3:55
5. Wimpy Thing – 4:40
6. Butch and Bruce Go Under the Sea – 5:20
7. Whale City – 12:40

== Band Members ==
- Chuck Lamb – acoustic piano, Fender-Rhodes electric piano, Mini-Moog, clavinet
- Rich Lamb – electric bass
- Rod Fleeman – electric guitar
- Jon Margolis – drums, percussion

== Production ==
- Dry Jack: Producers
- Michael Barry: Engineering
- Jason Corsaro: Assistant engineer
- Bob Ludwig: Mastering
