= One Touch =

One Touch may refer to:

- One Touch (Eric Marienthal album), 1993
- One Touch (Sugababes album), 2000
- "One Touch" (Jess Glynne and Jax Jones song), 2019
- "One Touch" (Kadiatou song), 2021
- "One Touch" (Mini Viva song), 2010
- "One Touch" (Michael Fall song), from the 2013 album Turn on your radio
- "One Touch", a song by LCD Soundsystem from This Is Happening
- "One Touch", a song by Steps from What the Future Holds
- One-touch football, a tactic in association football
- OneTouch Ultra, a blood glucose monitoring system
