= Chuck Findley =

American jazz musician (born 1947)

- Born: Charles B. Findley; December 13, 1947 (age 78); Johnstown, Pennsylvania, U.S.
- Genres: Jazz
- Occupation: Musician
- Instruments: Trumpet, flugelhorn, trombone
- Years active: 1970s–present
- Formerly of: Jimmy Dorsey Big Band; Buddy Rich Band; The Tonight Show Band (led by Doc Severinsen); Kevin Eubanks and The Tonight Show Band

Charles B. Findley (born December 13, 1947, in Johnstown, Pennsylvania) is an American trumpet player known for his diverse work as a session musician. He also plays other brass instruments such as flugelhorn and trombone. His technical abilities and versatility are renowned even among other session players, with the celebrated session horn player and arranger Jerry Hey saying "Chuck Findley can play anything".

== Early life and career ==
Findley graduated Maple Heights High School in Ohio in 1965 and later the Cleveland Institute of Music. Findley's first professional work was with the Jimmy Dorsey Big Band before joining the Buddy Rich Band on a world tour.

In 1972, Findley was part of the High Voltage band. He played on their self-titled album that was released on the Columbia label that year.

In 1989 he joined the Tonight Show band led by Doc Severinsen. He was also a member of the band on The Tonight Show with Jay Leno from 1994 to 2001.

A regular collaborator on recordings by artists such as B. B. King and Steely Dan, he has also played and/or recorded with Nancy Sinatra, Miles Davis, Stanley Turrentine, Toto, Pat Boone, Christopher Cross, Jaco Pastorius, James Last, Lee Ritenour, Jackson Browne, George Benson, Luis Miguel, George Harrison, Elton John, Carole King, Rickie Lee Jones, Joni Mitchell, Jose Feliciano, The Rolling Stones, Dionne Warwick, Diane Schuur, Tom Waits, Randy Newman, Tina Turner, Al Jarreau, Sarah Vaughan, Narada Michael Walden, Buddy Rich and many others.

Chuck Findley played the flugelhorn solo on the Carpenters 1970 #1 hit record "(They Long to Be) Close to You".

Findley often collaborates with his brother Bob, another trumpet player.

Findley is considered to be a member of The Wrecking Crew.

He played the trumpet solo in Blade Runner Blues by Vangelis.

== Discography ==
With Steely Dan

- The Royal Scam (1976)
- Aja (1977)
- Gaucho (1980)

With Richard "Groove" Holmes

- Welcome Home (World Pacific, 1968)
- Six Million Dollar Man, (RCA/Flying Dutchman, 1975)

With Toto

- Toto (1978)
- Isolation (1984)
- Fahrenheit (1986)
- The Seventh One (1988)
- Kingdom of Desire (1992)
- Mindfields (1999)

With Al Jarreau

- This Time (1980)
- Breakin' Away (1981)
- Jarreau (1983)
- High Crime (1984)

With GRP All-Star Big Band

- Dave Grusin Presents GRP All-Star Big Band Live! (GRP, 1993)
- All Blues (GRP, 1995)

With Metropole Orchestra, Rob Pronk

- Star Eyes - live (2001)

With others

- B.B. King in London, B.B. King (1971)
- Rita Coolidge, Rita Coolidge (1971)
- L.A. Reggae, Johnny Rivers (1972)
- Goats Head Soup, The Rolling Stones (1973)
- Fantasy, Carole King (1973)
- Sarah Vaughan with Michel Legrand, Sarah Vaughan (1973)
- Ringo, Ringo Starr (1973)
- Lulu, Lulu (1973)
- Compartments, José Feliciano (1973)
- Love Has Got Me, Wendy Waldman (1973)
- Blue Shuede Shoes, Johnny Rivers (1973)
- Share My Love, Gloria Jones (1973)
- Gypsy Symphony, Wendy Waldman (1974)
- Wrap Around Joy, Carole King (1974)
- Laughter in the Rain, Neil Sedaka (1974)
- Court and Spark, Joni Mitchell (1974)
- For My Love... Mother Music, José Feliciano (1974)
- Let's Love, Peggy Lee (1974)
- Pussy Cats, Harry Nilsson (1974)
- Come a Little Closer, Etta James (1974)
- Goodnight Vienna, Ringo Starr (1974)
- Dark Horse, George Harrison (1974)
- Slow Dancer, Boz Scaggs (1974)
- Just Wanna Rock 'n' Roll, José Feliciano (1975)
- Rising Sun, Yvonne Elliman (1975)
- The Hungry Years, Neil Sedaka (1975)
- Acid Queen, Tina Turner (1975)
- Common Sense, John Prine (1975)
- Mirrors, Peggy Lee (1975)
- Gorilla, James Taylor (1975)
- Extra Texture (Read All About It), George Harrison (1975)
- New Lovers and Old Friends, Johnny Rivers (1975)
- Rhinestone Cowboy, Glen Campbell (1975)
- The Hissing of Summer Lawns, Joni Mitchell (1975)
- I've Got the Music in Me, Thelma Houston (1975)
- Everybody Come On Out, Stanley Turrentine (Fantasy, 1976)
- Streetheart, Dion DiMucci (1976)
- Hejira, Joni Mitchell (1976)
- Anticipation, Willie Tee (1976)
- I'd Rather Believe in You, Cher (1976)
- The Pretender, Jackson Browne (1976)
- Music, Music, Helen Reddy (1976)
- Slow Down World, Donovan (1976)
- Bloodline, Glen Campbell (1976)
- White On White, Brian Cadd (1976)
- Silk Degrees, Boz Scaggs (1976)
- Killer Joe, Benny Golson (Columbia, 1977)
- Down Two Then Left, Boz Scaggs (1977)
- Love at First Sight, Dionne Warwick (1977)
- I'm Glad You're Here with Me Tonight, Neil Diamond (1977)
- Song Bird, Deniece Williams (1977)
- Outside Help, Johnny Rivers (1977)
- Tropical Nights, Liza Minnelli (1977)
- Nicolette, Nicolette Larson (1978)
- Southern Winds, Maria Muldaur (1978)
- Frankie Valli... Is the Word, Frankie Valli (1978)
- Don't Cry Out Loud, Melissa Manchester (1978)
- Gypsy Woman, Leroy Gomez (1978)
- Dane Donohue, Dane Donohue (1978)
- Night Flight, Yvonne Elliman (1978)
- Midnight Believer, B.B. King (1978)
- Cheryl Lynn, Cheryl Lynn (1978)
- Wild Child, Valerie Carter (1978)
- Totally Hot, Olivia Newton-John (1978)
- Christopher Cross, Christopher Cross (1979)
- Great Balls of Fire, Dolly Parton (1979)
- September Morn, Neil Diamond (1979)
- Rickie Lee Jones, Rickie Lee Jones (1979)
- Headlines, Paul Anka (1979)
- Yvonne, Yvonne Elliman (1979)
- Born Again, Randy Newman (1979)
- Brenda Russell, Brenda Russell (1979)
- No One Home, Lalo Schifrin (Tabu, 1979)
- Don't Look Back, Natalie Cole (1980)
- 21 at 33, Elton John (1980)
- Barry, Barry Manilow (1980)
- Messina, Jim Messina (1981)
- Secret Combination, Randy Crawford (1981)
- José Feliciano, José Feliciano (1981)
- Night Fades Away, Nils Lofgren (1981)
- Should I Do It, Tanya Tucker (1981)
- Dolly, Dolly, Dolly, Dolly Parton (1981)
- Night After Night, Steve Cropper (1982)
- Heartbreak Express, Dolly Parton (1982)
- Friends in Love, Dionne Warwick (1982)
- Ride Like the Wind, Freddie Hubbard (Elektra/Musician, 1982)
- Trumpets No End, Chuck Findley and Bobby Shew (1983)
- Swordfishtrombones, Tom Waits (1983)
- She Works Hard for the Money, Donna Summer (1983)
- Girl at Her Volcano, Rickie Lee Jones (1983)
- Robbery, Teena Marie (1983)
- Not a Through Street, Johnny Rivers (1983)
- Camouflage, Rod Stewart (1984)
- No Lookin' Back, Michael McDonald (1985)
- Every Turn of the World, Christopher Cross (1985)
- Dreamland Express, John Denver (1985)
- Winner in You, Patti LaBelle (1986)
- Emerald City, Teena Marie (1986)
- Heavy Nova, Robert Palmer (1988)
- Till I Loved You, Barbra Streisand (1988)
- The Rumour, Olivia Newton-John (1988)
- Giving You the Best That I Got, Anita Baker (1988)
- Mr. Jordan, Julian Lennon (1989)
- Like a Prayer, Madonna (1989)
- Dingo, Miles Davis (Warner Bros., 1990)
- Don't Explain, Robert Palmer (1990)
- Once More...With Feeling!, Doc Severinsen (1991)
- Unforgettable... with Love, Natalie Cole (1991)
- Pure Schuur, Diane Schuur (1991)
- Ridin' High, Robert Palmer (1992)
- Love Remembers, George Benson (1993)
- Evolution, Oleta Adams (1993)
- Blink of an Eye, Michael McDonald (1993)
- Joe Cool's Blues, Wynton Marsalis/Ellis Marsalis (1994)
- Night Creatures, Tom Scott (1995)
- My Cherie, Sheena Easton (1995)
- Yonder Tree, Gino Vannelli (1995)
- Vibrator, Terence Trent D'Arby (1995)
- The Road to Ensenada, Lyle Lovett (1996)
- Gently, Liza Minnelli (1996)
- Walk Tall, Eric Marienthal (1999)
- Red Heat, Jimmy Haslip (2000)
- Swing When You're Winning, Robbie Williams (2001)
- The Movie Album, Barbra Streisand (2003)
- Menza Lines, Don Menza (2005)
- Hymn for My Soul, Joe Cocker (2007)
- Home Before Dark, Neil Diamond (2008)
- Songs and Stories, George Benson (2009)
- Soulbook, Rod Stewart (2009)
- Shadows on the Moon, Johnny Rivers (2009)
- Kaleidoscope Heart, Sara Bareilles (2010)
- To Be Loved, Michael Bublé (2013)
- The Diving Board, Elton John (2013)
- Swings Both Ways, Robbie Williams (2013)
- Storytone, Neil Young (2014)
- The Search for Everything, John Mayer (2017)
- Meaning of Life, Kelly Clarkson (2017)
- Deeper, Lisa Stansfield (2018)
- It's the Holiday Season, Martina McBride (2018)
- Black Moon, Lucifer's Friend (2019)
