= Water Sign =

Water Sign may refer to:

- Water sign, a division of the astrological elements
- Water Sign (Jeff Lorber album), 1979
- Water Sign (Chris Rea album), 1983
