= Galaxian (album) =

Studio album by The Jeff Lorber Fusion
- Released: 1981
- Recorded: December 16, 1980 – January 27, 1981
- Studio: Hollywood Sound Recorders (Hollywood, California)
- Genre: Jazz fusion Smooth jazz Funk
- Length: 36:03
- Label: Arista
- Producer: Jeff Lorber Rik Pekkonen

The Jeff Lorber Fusion chronology
| Wizard Island (1980) | Galaxian (1981) | It's a Fact (1982) |

Professional ratings
Review scores
| Source | Rating |
|---|---|
| Allmusic | 3/5 stars |
| The Rolling Stone Jazz Record Guide | 2/5 stars |

Galaxian is the fifth album by keyboardist Jeff Lorber as leader of his band "The Jeff Lorber Fusion". Released in 1981, this was Lorber's last album as leader of his band "The Jeff Lorber Fusion" until 2010's Now Is The Time.

== Track listing ==
All songs composed by Jeff Lorber, except where noted.

1. "Monster Man" (Lorber, Stanley Clarke) - 3:29
2. "Seventh Mountain" (Lorber, Tom Grant) - 5:20
3. "Magic Lady" - 4:43
4. "Night Love" - 5:10
5. "Spur of the Moment" (Lorber, Kenny G, Danny Wilson) - 4:13
6. "Think Back and Remember" - 4:18
7. "Bright Sky" - 4:16
8. "Galaxian" - 4:22

== Personnel ==
The Jeff Lorber Fusion

- Jeff Lorber – acoustic piano, Fender Rhodes, electric grand piano, Prophet-10, Oberheim Eight Voice, Moog Modular System, Minimoog
- Danny Wilson – bass
- Dennis Bradford – drums
- Kenny Gorelick – saxophones, flute

Guest musicians

- Marlon McClain – guitars (1, 5, 6, 8), guitar solo (8)
- Dean Parks – guitars (2–4, 7, 8), guitar solo (2)
- Stanley Clarke – bass solo (1)
- Paulinho da Costa – percussion
- Kim Hutchcroft – horns
- Larry Williams – horns
- Jerry Hey – horns
- Donny Gerrard – vocals (1, 6)
- George Johnson – arrangements (6)

== Production ==
- Jeff Lorber – producer
- Rik Pekkonen – producer, engineer, mixing
- Bernie Grundman – mastering at Bernie Grundman Mastering (Hollywood, California).
- Ria Lewerke-Shapiro – art direction, design
- Douglas Kirkland – front cover photography
- Aaron Rapoport – back cover photography
- Sue Reilly – lettering
- Jeffrey Ross Music – management

== Charts ==
| Chart (1981) | Peak position |
|---|---|
| Billboard Pop Albums | 77 |
| Billboard Top Soul Albums | 45 |
| Billboard Top Jazz Albums | 6 |
