= The Jeff Lorber Fusion (album) =

Studio album by The Jeff Lorber Fusion
- Released: 1977
- Recorded: 1977
- Studio: Ripcord Studios (Vancouver, Washington)
- Genres: Jazz fusion Smooth jazz Funk
- Label: Inner City Records
- Producers: Jeff Lorber Harry Callow

The Jeff Lorber Fusion chronology
The Jeff Lorber Fusion (1977)	Soft Space (1978)

Professional ratings
Review scores
Source	Rating
Allmusic	3/5 stars
The Rolling Stone Jazz Record Guide	3/5 stars
DownBeat	3.5/5 stars

The Jeff Lorber Fusion is the debut album by keyboardist Jeff Lorber as leader of his band "The Jeff Lorber Fusion."

== Track listing ==
All tracks are written by Jeff Lorber.

Side one
No.	Title	Length
1.	"Funky Gospel"	5:38
2.	"Glisten"	6:00
3.	"Deva Samba"	4:28
4.	"Refunk"	1:53
5.	"Terry's Lament"	6:14

Side two
No.	Title	Length
1.	"Lift Off"	3:09
2.	"Chinese Medicinal Herbs"	5:03
3.	"Water Music"	4:07
4.	"River Winds"	4:20
5.	"Cousin Stu"	5:44
6.	"Poppin'"	4:17

== Personnel ==
The Jeff Lorber Fusion

- Jeff Lorber – keyboards
- Lester McFarland – electric bass
- Dennis Bradford – drums
- Terry Layne – reeds, flutes

Guest musicians

- Tod Carver – guitars (7, 8)
- Ron Young – percussion (3)
- Bruce Smith – percussion (4, 7, 8)
- Jeff Uusitalo – trombone (5)

== Production ==
- Jeff Lorber – producer
- Harry Callow – producer
- Dave Dixon – engineer
- Suzanne Hill – design
- Orval Goodwin – photography

== Charts ==
Chart (1980)	Peak position
Billboard Top Jazz Albums	30
