= He Had a Hat =

Studio album by Jeff Lorber
- Released: April 3, 2007
- Studio: JHL Sound (Pacific Palisades, California); Sunset Sound (Hollywood, California); Capitol Studios (Hollywood, California); The Lair Studio (Los Angeles, California); Avatar (New York, New York)
- Genre: Smooth jazz
- Length: 55:39
- Label: Blue Note
- Producer: Bobby Colomby

Jeff Lorber chronology
Flipside (2005)	He Had a Hat (2007)	Heard That (2008)

Professional ratings
Review scores
Source	Rating
Allmusic	4/5 stars

He Had a Hat is a 2007 album by jazz pianist Jeff Lorber. All compositions on this album were original, except for "Grandma's Hands" which was originally composed and performed by Bill Withers.

The album, and title track, are named after the punchline of an old Jewish joke about a grandmother whose grandson is saved from drowning in the ocean after she prays to God. The joke was told to Lorber by the album's producer, Bobby Colomby, in the recording studio, and Lorber felt it fit in well with the album's lighthearted mood. The then-current horn section of Blood, Sweat & Tears appears on five of the album's tracks.

He Had a Hat was nominated for a 2008 Grammy Award for Best Contemporary Jazz Album, losing to Herbie Hancock's River: The Joni Letters.

== Track listing ==
All songs written by Jeff Lorber and Bobby Colomby, except where noted.

1. "Anthem For a New America" - 3:48
2. "He Had a Hat" - 4:34
3. "Grandma's Hands"; featuring Eric Benét (Bill Withers) - 4:07
4. "Surreptitious" - 4:10
5. "All Most Blues" - 4:24
6. "Orchid"; featuring Chris Botti (Jeff Lorber, Chris Botti) - 3:53
7. "Be Bop" - 2:28
8. "The Other Side of the Heart"; featuring Eric Benét and Paula Cole (Paula Cole, Jeff Lorber) - 5:35
9. "Hudson" - 3:58
10. "Super Fusion Unit" - 3:52
11. "Eye Tunes" - 3:50
12. "Requiem For Gandalf" - 3:44
13. "Burn Brightly" - 3:52
14. Bonus Track: "Deep Night" - 3:33

== Personnel ==
- Jeff Lorber – all keyboards, keyboard solos
- Paul Jackson Jr. – guitars (2–4, 8, 10)
- Paul Brown – guitars (3)
- Russell Malone – guitars (13)
- Brian Bromberg – bass (1, 5–7, 11, 12, 14)
- Alex Al – bass (2–4, 8–10, 13)
- Abe Laboriel Jr. – drums (1–3, 8, 9)
- Dave Weckl – drums (4, 10, 13)
- Vinnie Colaiuta – drums (5–7, 11, 12, 14)
- Lenny Castro – percussion (2, 9, 10, 12–14), tambourine (3)
- Jeremy Lubbock – orchestrations (1, 8)
- The Krim Symphonic Orchestra – orchestra (1, 8)
- Eric Benét – vocals (3, 8)
- Paula Cole – vocals (8)

Horn sections

- Jeff Lorber – horn arrangements (2, 4, 7, 9–11, 13)
- Tom Scott – horn arrangements (3, 5)
- Randy Brecker – horn arrangements (4)
- Hernan "Teddy" Mulet – horn arrangements (4)
- Bobby Colomby – horn arrangements (7, 9, 11, 13)

Horn performers

- Kirk Whalum – tenor saxophone (2), horns (2)
- Gerald Albright – alto saxophone (3)
- Ada Rovatti – tenor saxophone (4)
- Tom Timko – saxophones (4, 7, 9, 11, 13)
- Tom Scott – horns (3), alto saxophone (5)
- John Mitchell – bass clarinet (5, 10, 12)
- Bob Sheppard – alto flute (5, 10, 12), flute (5, 10, 12), tenor saxophone (6, 9)
- Jeff Driskill – alto flute (5, 10, 12)
- Hubert Laws – flute (9, 11)
- Jacques Voyemant – trombone (2)
- Jens Wendelboe – bass trombone (4, 7, 9, 11, 13), trombone (4, 7, 9, 11, 13)
- Greg Gosnell – bass trombone (5, 10, 12)
- Bob McChesney – trombone (5, 10, 12)
- Randy Brecker – trumpet (4)
- Steve Jankowski – trumpet (4, 7, 9, 11, 13), flugelhorn (4, 7, 9, 11, 13)
- Hernan "Teddy" Mulet – trumpet (4, 7, 9, 11, 13), flugelhorn (4, 7, 9, 11, 13)
- Gary Grant – trumpet (5, 10, 12)
- Chris Botti – trumpet (6, 14)
- Steven Durnin – French horn (5, 10, 12)
- Richard Todd – French horn (5, 10, 12)

== Production ==
- Eli Wolf – A&R
- Bobby Colomby – producer
- Jeff Lorber – recording, mixing (4, 6)
- Dave Rideau – basic track recording
- Paul Brown – mixing (1–3, 5, 7–13)
- Kevin Killen – guitar recording (13)
- Dragan "DC" Capor – mix assistant (1–3, 5, 7–13)
- Larry Goetz – recording assistant for horns (2–4, 7, 9, 11, 13)
- Chris Bellman – mastering at Bernie Grundman Mastering (Hollywood, California)
- Keith Karwelies – A&R administration
- Josh Gold – product manager
- Adam Barber – orchestrations
- Dante DeSilva – music copyist
- Gordon H. Jee – creative direction
- Carla Leighton – art direction, design
- Jeff Bender – photography
- Bud Harner – management at Chapman Management
