= Dry Jack =

American jazz band

- Origin: upstate New York
- Genres: Jazz Fusion; Jazz
- Years active: 1973–1982
- Label: Inner City Records
- Members: Chuck Lamb; Rich Lamb; Rod Fleeman; Jon Margolis
- Past members: Theano Anifantakis; Tony DePaulo; Evan DuChene; John Lamb; Rocco Marshall; Clint Swank
- Website: facebook.com/DryJackFans

Dry Jack is an American jazz fusion band, active originally during the 1970s and the 1980s. Dry Jack formed in 1973 by founder keyboardist Chuck Lamb and his bassist brother Rich. Drummer Jon Margolis joined a year later and guitarist Rod Fleeman in 1977. Dry Jack was cited in Rolling Stone's History of Music as “one of the premier, cutting edge bands of the electric jazz movement.” They followed on the heels of Larry Coryell's The Eleventh House, Chick Corea's Return to Forever, and Weather Report. Dry Jack shared the stage with many musical greats, including Ray Charles, Pat Metheny, Freddie Hubbard, and McCoy Tyner. Chuck Lamb described the inspiration for the band's name as coming from a patron, who after listening to the music declared, "That's really dry, jack."

The band released two albums: Magical Elements and Whale City through the Inner City Records label.

Regular band members were Chuck Lamb on piano and his brother Rich Lamb on bass guitar. Other band members included Evan DuChene and Jon Margolis on drums; John Lamb, Rocco Marshall, Clint Swank, Tony DePaolo and Rod Fleeman on guitar. Theano Anifantakis was featured on vocals in the 1980s.

In 2016, the band reunioned and started to record a third album, called Alien Intervention. Band members include Chuck and Rich Lamb, Jon Margolis, and Rod Fleeman.

== Discography ==
=== Studio albums ===
Year	Album	CD Release
1978	Magical Elements: Recorded: October 1978; Released: July 1979; Label: Inner City; Aimee Chiariello and Dry Jack: Co-producers; Bob Ludwig: Mastering	2008
1979	Whale City: Recorded: July 1979; Released: 1979; Label: Inner City; Producer: Dry Jack; Bob Ludwig: Mastering	2010

== Live performances ==
Notable live performances by Dry Jack include their 2017 reunion concert held in Rapid City, South Dakota and their 35-Year Reunion in Denver, Colorado in 2015. Additionally, performances have also been held in New York City, Colorado, Kansas City, Missouri, and Rapid City, South Dakota.

== See also ==
- Yacht rock
