= Galaxy (Jeff Lorber Fusion album) =

Studio album by Jeff Lorber Fusion
- Released: January 31, 2012
- Genre: Jazz
- Length: 55.24

Jeff Lorber Fusion chronology
Now Is The Time (2010)	Galaxy (2012)	Hacienda (2013)

Galaxy is the seventh studio album by The Jeff Lorber Fusion it was released in January 2012.

== Track listing ==
1. "Live Wire"-4:03
2. "Big Brother"-4:50
3. "Montserrat-4:50
4. "Singraja" - 4:36
5. "Galaxy"-5:17
6. "City"-4:29
7. "Horace"-5:34
8. "The Samba"-4:49 (featuring Larry Koonse)
9. "Rapids"-4:25
10. "Wizard Island"-4:50
11. "The Underground"-4:39 (featuring Randy Brecker)
