= All Blues (GRP All-Star Big Band album) =

Studio album by GRP All-Star Big Band
- Released: 1995
- Recorded: January 8–9, 1994
- Studio: Ocean Way Recording (Los Angeles, California)
- Genre: Jazz, big band
- Length: 61:07
- Label: GRP
- Producer: Dave Grusin, Larry Rosen, Michael Abene

GRP All-Star Big Band chronology
Dave Grusin Presents GRP All-Star Big Band Live! (1993)	All Blues (1995)

All Blues is an album by the GRP All-Star Big Band that won the Grammy Award for Best Large Jazz Ensemble Performance in 1996.

== Track listing ==
No.	Title	Writer(s)	Length
1.	"Cookin' at the Continental"	Horace Silver	5:41
2.	"Stormy Monday"	T-Bone Walker	5:17
3.	"All Blues"	Miles Davis	7:38
4.	"Birk's Works"	Louie Bellson/Herb Ellis/Dizzy Gillespie/James Harris/Oscar Brown/Flip Phillips/Roy Eldridge	6:02
5.	"Goodbye Pork Pie Hat"	Charles Mingus	5:20
6.	"Señor Blues"	Horace Silver	6:16
7.	"Blue Miles"	Chick Corea	5:33
8.	"Mysterioso/Ba-Lue Bolivar Ba-Lues-Are"	Thelonious Monk	8:12
9.	"Some Other Blues"	John Coltrane	3:47
10.	"Aunt Hagar's Blues"	W. C. Handy	7:21

== Personnel ==
Horn section

- Tom Scott – band director, baritone saxophone, soprano saxophone, tenor saxophone, tenor sax solo (1),
- Ernie Watts – soprano saxophone, tenor saxophone, tenor sax solo (5)
- Eric Marienthal – alto saxophone, soprano saxophone, alto sax solo (4)
- Nelson Rangell – flute, alto saxophone, soprano saxophone, flute solo (6)
- Bob Mintzer – bass clarinet, soprano saxophone, tenor saxophone, tenor sax solo (9)
- Michael Brecker – tenor sax solo (7, 8)
- George Bohanon – trombone, trombone solo (2, 5)
- Randy Brecker – flugelhorn, trumpet, trumpet solo (3, 10)
- Chuck Findley – flugelhorn, trumpet, trumpet solo (4, 9)
- Arturo Sandoval – flugelhorn, trumpet, trumpet solo (1, 6)

Rhythm section

- Russell Ferrante – acoustic piano (1, 5, 9), Hammond B3 organ (2), acoustic piano solo (5, 9)
- Ramsey Lewis – acoustic piano (2, 6, 10), acoustic piano solo (6, 10)
- Dave Grusin – acoustic piano (3, 4), acoustic piano solo (3, 4)
- Chick Corea – acoustic piano (7, 8), acoustic piano solo (7, 8)
- B.B. King – guitar (2), vocals (2)
- John Patitucci – double bass (1, 3-10), electric bass (2), bass solo (3)
- Dave Weckl – drums

Arrangements

- Michael Abene (1, 8, 10)
- Tom Scott (2, 9)
- Dave Grusin (3, 6)
- Bob Mintzer (4, 5)
- Russell Ferrante (7)

=== Production ===
- Dave Grusin – executive producer
- Larry Rosen – executive producer
- Michael Abene – producer
- Gretchen Hoffman Abene – associate producer
- Bernie Kirsh – recording, mixing
- Ted Jensen – mastering at Sterling Sound (New York, NY)
