= One Touch (Eric Marienthal album) =

Studio album by Eric Marienthal
- Released: 1993
- Recorded: 1993 at
- Studio: JHL Studios-Pacific Palisides, California
- Genre: Jazz
- Length: 48:32
- Label: GRP
- Producer: Jeff Lorber

Eric Marienthal chronology
Oasis (1991)	One Touch (1993)	Street Dance (1994)

One Touch is an album by American saxophonistist Eric Marienthal released in 1993, and recorded for the GRP label. The album reached No. 11 on Billboard's contemporary Jazz chart.

== Track listing ==
1. No Doubt About It (written by: Jeff Lorber / Eric Marienthal) - 4:33
2. That's The Way (Dave Koz / Kiki Ebsen / Randy Hall) - 4:00
3. One For James (Russell Ferrante / Jimmy Haslip) - 4:49
4. Walk Through The Fire (Jeff Lorber / Dave Koz / Allee Willis) - 5:24
5. Ouch! (Jeff Lorber / Eric Marienthal / Oliver Leiber) - 4:34
6. Westland (Jeff Lorber / Eric Marienthal) - 5:06
7. The Village (Russell Ferrante) - 5:59
8. Tanto Amor (Russell Ferrante / Ivan Lins) - 4:38
9. Backtalk (Eric Marienthal / Jimmy Earl / Jeff Lorber) - 3:54
10. Where Are You (David Benoit / Eric Marienthal) - 5:34

== Personnel ==
- Eric Marienthal - alto saxophone (1, 3, 4, 5, 6, 7, 9); soprano saxophone (2, 8, 10); tenor saxophone (3); baritone saxophone (3)
- Dave Koz - soprano saxophone (2)
- Paul Jackson, Jr. - guitar (1, 2, 4, 6, 9)
- James Harrah - guitar (3, 7)
- Oliver Leiber - guitar (5)
- Peter Sprague - guitar (8)
- Alec Milstein - bass (1, 2, 4, 5, 6, 9)
- John Pattitucci - bass (1, 5: solos)
- Jimmy Haslip - bass (3, 7, 8, 10)
- Jeff Lorber - synthesizers, sequencing, drum programming (1, 2, 4, 5, 6, 9)
- Russell Ferrante - piano, keyboards (3, 7, 8); sequence programming (3, 7)
- David Benoit - piano, keyboard sequencing (10)
- John Robinson - drums (3, 7, 10)
- Paulinho Da Costa - percussion (1, 2, 4, 5, 6, 9)
- Alex Acuña - percussion (7, 8, 10); drums (8)
- Wayne Bergeron - trumpet (3)
- Andy Martin - trombone (3)
- Carl Anderson - vocals (4)
- Ivan Lins - vocals (8)
- Kiki Ebsen - background vocals (2)
- Randy Hall - background vocals (2)
- Benet - background vocals (4)

== Charts ==
Chart (1993)	Peak position
US Top Contemporary Jazz Albums (Billboard)	11
