= In the Heat of the Night (Jeff Lorber album) =

Studio album by Jeff Lorber
- Released: July 26, 1984
- Studio: Tracks 1 & 9 recorded at Syncro Sound (Boston, Massachusetts); Tracks 2–8 & 10 recorded at Indigo Ranch Studios (Malibu, California); Mixed at Normandy Sound (Warren, Rhode Island)
- Genre: Smooth jazz; jazz fusion
- Length: 40:24
- Label: Arista
- Producer: Jeff Lorber; Maurice Starr

Jeff Lorber chronology
It's a Fact (1982)	In the Heat of the Night (1984)	Step by Step (1985)

Singles from In the Heat of the Night
- 1. "In the Heat of the Night" Released: 1984

Professional ratings
Review scores
Source	Rating
AllMusic	3/5 stars
The Rolling Stone Jazz Record Guide	2/5 stars

In the Heat of the Night is the second solo studio album by jazz keyboardist Jeff Lorber.

The album peaked at No. 7 on the Traditional Jazz Albums chart and No. 44 on the Top Black Albums chart.

Its artwork consists of a still image from a 1982 commercial promoting the acquisition of American electronic brand Quasar from Motorola to Matsushita Electric Industrial, which is now Panasonic.

== Track listing ==
No.	Title	Writer(s)	Length
1.	"In the Heat of the Night"	Maurice Starr	4:14
2.	"Really Scarey"	Jeff Lorber, Nathan East	4:08
3.	"Don't Say Yes"	Lorber, Tony Haynes, Marlon McClain	4:07
4.	"Tropical"	Lorber	4:12
5.	"Sushi Monster"	Lorber, Nathan East, McClain	3:14
6.	"Rock II"	Lorber	4:26
7.	"Seventh Heaven"	Lorber, McClain	4:21
8.	"Double Bad"	Lorber, Joe Ericksen, Jack Robinson	4:18
9.	"Blast Off"	Starr	3:45
10.	"Water Fall"	Lorber	4:07

== Personnel ==
- Jeff Lorber – keyboards, guitars (1, 6, 9), drum programming (1, 9), lead vocals (1), backing vocals (1, 9), guitar solo (5), arrangements (8)
- Maurice Starr – keyboards (1, 9), guitars (1, 9), drum programming (1, 9), lead vocals (1), backing vocals (1, 9)
- Marlon McClain – guitars (2–8, 10), guitar solo (5)
- Lee Ritenour – rhythm guitar (5)
- Nathan East – bass (2–8, 10), vocals (2)
- John Robinson – cymbals (1, 9), drums (2–8, 10)
- Jimmy Johnson – congas (1, 9)
- Paulinho da Costa – percussion (2–8, 10)
- Ronnie Laws – saxophone solo (3)
- Phillip Ingram – lead vocals (3)
- Steve George – backing vocals (2–8, 10)
- David Page – backing vocals (2–8, 10)
- Richard Page – backing vocals (2–8, 10)
- Alex Ligertwood – lead vocals (8)

== Production ==
- Maurice Starr – producer (1, 9)
- Jeff Lorber – producer (2–8, 10)
- Phil Greene – recording (1, 9), mixing (1, 9)
- Chris Brunt – recording (2–8, 10), mixing (2–8, 10)
- Joe Moody – second engineer (1, 9)
- Ben Ing – second engineer (2–8, 10)
- Bill Kipper – mastering at Masterdisk (New York City, New York)
- Ria Lewerke – art direction
- Aaron Rapoport – back cover photography
- Steve Drimmer – manager
- Allen Kovac – manager
- Left Bank Management – management company

Technical design

- Robert Abel – executive producer
- Bob Regalado – producer
- Richard Hollander – technical director
- Randy Roberts – creative director, design

== Charts ==
Chart (1984)	Peak position
Billboard 200	106
Billboard Top Black Albums	44
Billboard Top Jazz Albums	7
