= Hacienda (album) =

Studio album by Jeff Lorber Fusion
- Released: August 27, 2013
- Studio: JHL Sound (Pacific Palisades, California) Cocoa Butt Studio (Culver City, California) Gong Vibe Mobile Studio 107 and Electric Lady Studios (New York City, New York)
- Genre: Jazz fusion, smooth jazz
- Length: 56:09
- Label: Heads Up Records/Concord Records
- Producer: Jeff Lorber; Jimmy Haslip

Jeff Lorber Fusion chronology
Galaxy (2012)	Hacienda (2013)	Step It Up (2015)

Hacienda is the eighth studio album by Grammy Award nominated Jazz band Jeff Lorber Fusion. Hacienda was nominated for Best Pop Instrumental Album at the 56th Annual Grammy Awards (held on January 26, 2014) losing to Herb Alpert for Steppin' Out.

== Track listing ==
All tracks composed by Jeff Lorber; except where indicated

1. "Corinaldo" - 4:28
2. "Solar Wind" - 4:58; Featuring Larry Koonse
3. "King Kong" - 5:41 (Frank Zappa); Featuring Jean-Luc Ponty
4. "The Steppe" - 5:20
5. "Hacienda" - 5:31
6. "Fab Gear" - 4:54
7. "Raptor" - 5:46
8. "Everlast" - 5:09 (Jeff Lorber, Jimmy Haslip)
9. "Playa del Falco" - 4:45
10. "Escapade" - 4:58
11. "Dragonfly" - 4:39 (Jeff Lorber, Jimmy Haslip)

== Personnel ==
- Jeff Lorber – all keyboards, guitars (1–8, 10, 11), synth bass (2, 11)
- Paul Jackson, Jr. – guitars (1, 6–8, 10)
- Larry Koonse – guitars (2, 9)
- Michael Thompson – guitars (3, 5, 11), guitar orchestration (4)
- Jimmy Haslip – bass (1, 3–11)
- Vinnie Colaiuta – drums (1–9)
- Gary Novak – drums (10)
- Dave Weckl – drums (11)
- Lenny Castro – percussion (1, 4, 5, 7–10)
- Ed Mann – marimba (3)
- David Mann – flute (1, 2, 5–7, 10, 11), brass (1, 2, 5–7, 10, 11), saxophone section (1, 2, 5–7, 10, 11), horn arrangements (1, 2, 5–7, 10, 11)
- Eric Marienthal – saxophone (1, 2), alto saxophone (4–10), soprano saxophone (11)
- Jean-Luc Ponty – violin (3)

=== Production ===
- Jimmy Haslip – producer
- Jeff Lorber – producer, recording, mixing (5, 9–11)
- Michael H. Brauer – mixing (1–4, 6–8)
- Ed Mann – recording
- David Mann – recording
- Michael Thompson – recording
- Rich Breen – mastering at Dogmatic Sound (Burbank, California)
- Raffi Minasian – cover design
- Janet Woisborn – package design
- Greg Allen – photography
- Nikki Nouvelle – grooming
- Bud Harner for Chapman & Co. Management – management

== Production ==
- Jeff Lorber – producer, recording, mixing (5, 9–11)
- Jimmy Haslip – producer
- David Mann – recording
- Ed Mann – recording
- Michael Thompson – recording
- Michael H. Brauer – mixing (1–4, 8, 10)
- Rich Breen – mastering
- Raffi Minasian – cover artwork
- Janet Wolsborn – package design
- Greg Allen – photography
- Bud Harner – management

Studios

- Recorded at JHL Sound (Pacific Palisades, CA); Cocoa Butt Studio (Culver City, CA); Gong Vibe Mobile; Studio 107.
- Mixed at Electric Lady Studios (New York City, NY).
- Mastered at Dogmatic Studios (Burbank, CA).
