= Wizard Island (album) =

Studio album by The Jeff Lorber Fusion
- Released: 1980
- Recorded: February 5–22, 1980
- Studio: Hollywood Sound, Hollywood, California
- Genre: Jazz fusion Smooth jazz Funk
- Length: 36:57
- Label: Arista
- Producer: Jeff Lorber

The Jeff Lorber Fusion chronology
Water Sign (1979)	Wizard Island (1980)	Galaxian (1981)

Professional ratings
Review scores
Source	Rating
Allmusic	3/5 stars
The Rolling Stone Jazz Record Guide	2/5 stars

Wizard Island is the fourth album by The Jeff Lorber Fusion, released in 1980. The album was both Lorber's and the group's first to reach number one on the US Jazz Album chart. This album was Kenny G's 1st album with a major-label act. He played on the JLF follow-up album in 1981 and then went solo in 1982.

== Track listing ==
All tracks written by Jeff Lorber, except "Fusion Juice", written by Kenny G.

No.	Title	Length
1.	"Wizard Island"	4:04
2.	"Sweet"	3:54
3.	"Can't Get Enough"	3:36
4.	"Reflections"	5:15
5.	"Fusion Juice"	4:09
6.	"Lava Lands"	3:56
7.	"Shadows"	3:56
8.	"City"	4:00
9.	"Rooftops"	3:47

== Personnel ==
The Jeff Lorber Fusion

- Jeff Lorber – acoustic piano, Yamaha electric grand piano, Fender Rhodes, Minimoog, Moog Modular System, Oberheim OB-X, Prophet-5
- Danny Wilson – electric bass
- Dennis Bradford – drums
- Kenny Gorelick – flute, soprano saxophone, tenor saxophone

Guest Musicians

- Chick Corea – Minimoog (9)
- Jay Koder – guitars
- Paulinho da Costa – percussion

== Production ==
- Jeff Lorber – producer
- Rik Pekkonen – engineer, mixing
- Jeffrey Ross – album coordinator, management
- Ria Lewerke-Shapiro – art direction, design
- Mathew Cohen – front and back cover artwork
- Gary Regester – photography

== Charts ==
Chart (1980)	Peak position
Billboard Pop Albums	123
Billboard Top Jazz Albums	1
