= Oasis (Eric Marienthal album) =

Studio album by Eric Marienthal
- Released: 1991
- Recorded: 1991 at
- Studio: JHL Studios-Pacific Palisides, California
- Genre: Jazz
- Length: 49:04
- Label: GRP
- Producer: Jeff Lorber and Russell Ferrante

Eric Marienthal chronology
Crossroads (1990)	Oasis (1991)	One Touch (1993)

Oasis is an album by American saxophonistist Eric Marienthal released in 1991, and recorded for the GRP label. AllMusic noted in its review that Oasis is "diverse, exciting, and highly enjoyable", and that the album represents Marienthal's "greatest growth as a composer".

The album reached #5 on Billboard's contemporary Jazz chart.

== Track listing ==
1. Hustlin' (written by: Jeff Lorber / Eric Marienthal / Alec Millstein) - 4:24
2. Seafood To Go (Jeff Lorber / Alec Millstein / Eric Marienthal) - 4:54
3. Oasis (Eric Marienthal / Russell Ferrante / Jimmy Haslip) - 5:05
4. Understanding (Jeff Lorber / Eric Marienthal / Alec Milstein) - 4:45
5. Tryin' To Tell Ya (Jeff Lorber / Eric Marienthal) - 4:54
6. Barcelona (Russell Ferrante / Eric Marienthal / Jimmy Haslip) - 6:40
7. Big Country (Russell Ferrante / Eric Marienthal) - 4:53
8. Just To See You Again (Russell Ferrante / Jimmy Haslip / Scott Cross) - 5:03
9. Turn Out The Light (Alec Milstein) - 4:43
10. Another Shore (Russell Ferrante / Jimmy Haslip) - 4:02

== Personnel ==
- Eric Marienthal - saxophone
- Jeff Lorber - synthesizers
- John Pattitucci - bass
- Alec Milstein - bass
- Jimmy Haslip - bass
- Oliver Leiber - guitar
- Robben Ford - guitar
- Alex Acuna - percussion
- John Robinson - drums
- Perri - vocals

== Charts ==
Chart (1992)	Peak position
US Top Contemporary Jazz Albums (Billboard)	5
