= Flipside (album) =

Studio album by Jeff Lorber
- Released: February 15, 2005
- Studio: JHL Sound (Pacific Palisades, California); Dubie Grooves Studio (Santa Monica, California); Westlake Studios (Los Angeles, California)
- Genre: Jazz
- Length: 45:02
- Label: Narada
- Producer: Jeff Lorber; Steve Dubin

Jeff Lorber chronology
Philly Style (2003)	Flipside (2005)	He Had a Hat (2007)

Professional ratings
Review scores
Source	Rating
AllMusic	3.5/5 stars

Flipside is the twelfth studio album by Grammy Award-nominated jazz musician Jeff Lorber.

== Awards and nominations ==
"Flipside" was nominated for Best Pop Instrumental Album at the 48th Annual Grammy Awards but lost to "At This Time" by Burt Bacharach.

== Track listing ==
No.	Title	Writer(s)	Length
1.	"Ooh La La"	Jeff Lorber, Steve Dubin, Nelson Jackson	4:28
2.	"Everybody Knows That"	Lorber, Dubin	4:43
3.	"By My Side"	Lorber, Dubin	5:08
4.	"Flipside"	Lorber, Dubin, Jackson	4:04
5.	"Santa Monica Triangle"	Lorber, Dubin, Jackson	4:11
6.	"Sun Ra"	Lorber, Dubin	5:00
7.	"Angel in Paris"	Lorber, Dubin	5:12
8.	"Bombay Café"	Lorber, Dubin, Robbie Nevil	4:26
9.	"Tune 88"	Lorber	3:09
10.	"Enchanted Way"	Lorber, Dubin, Jackson	4:36

== Personnel ==
- Jeff Lorber – keyboards (1–8, 10), acoustic piano (1–4, 7, 8, 10), Wah guitar (1), Rhodes electric piano (5, 6), additional guitars (6), Wurlitzer electric piano (9)
- Nelson Jackson – additional keyboards (1, 4, 5, 7, 8, 10), synth bass (1, 4, 5), horn parts (4)
- Paul Jackson Jr. – guitars (2), acoustic guitar (5), reggae guitar (6)
- Robbie Nevil – guitars (3)
- Eric Wall – guitars (4, 5, 8, 10)
- Alex Al – bass (7, 9)
- "Lil'" John Roberts – drums (1–4, 6–8, 10)
- Steve Dubin – drum programming (5)
- Lenny Castro – percussion (1–8, 10), congas (9)
- David Mann – saxophones (2), horn arrangements (2), tenor saxophone (8)
- Gary Meek – tenor saxophone (4, 6, 8), flute (5), soprano saxophone (10)
- Ron King – trumpet (4, 6–8)
- Victor Lawrence – cello (3, 7)
- Andrea Martin – backing vocals (8)

== Production ==
- Steve Dubin – producer
- Jeff Lorber – producer
- Dave Rideau – drum recording
- Jez Colin – mixing
- Stephen Marcussen – mastering at Marcussen Mastering (Hollywood, California)
- Connie Gage – design
- Vincent Van De Wijngaard – photography
- Ron Moss for Chapman Management – management
- Harley Neuman – business management
