= Dave Valentin =

American Latin jazz flautist (1952–2017)

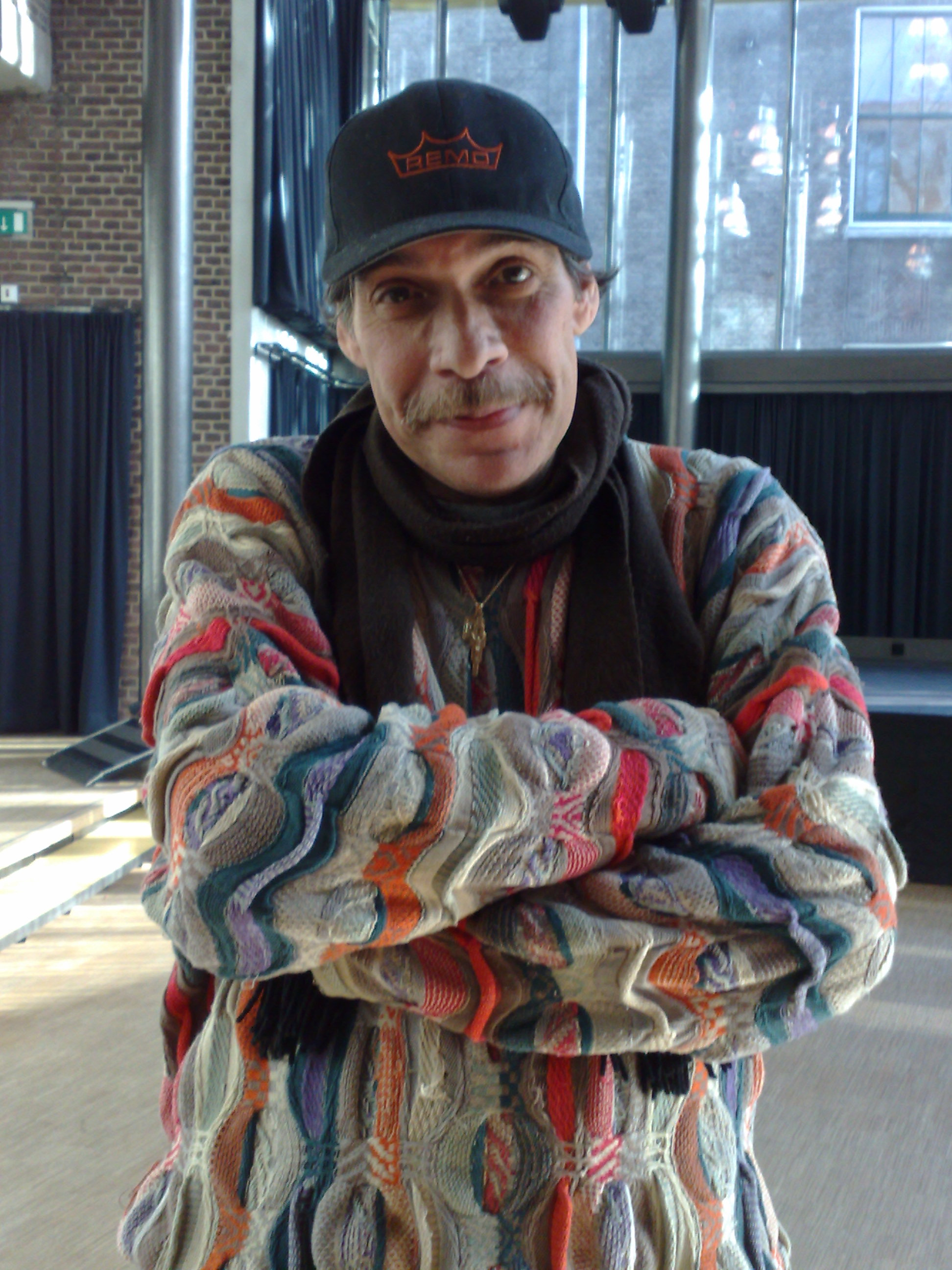
- Valentin at the World Music and Dance Centre, March 2008

Background information
- Born: David Peter Valentin; April 29, 1952; South Bronx, New York, U.S.
- Died: March 8, 2017 (aged 64) The Bronx, New York, U.S.
- Genres: Latin jazz, smooth jazz, salsa
- Occupation: Musician
- Instrument: Flute
- Years active: 1965–2012
- Labels: CTI, GRP, Highnote
- Formerly of: The Blackout All-Stars

David Peter Valentin (April 29, 1952 – March 8, 2017) was an American Latin jazz flautist of Puerto Rican descent.

== Life and career ==
Valentin was born on April 29, 1952, to Puerto Rican parents specifically from Mayagüez in the South Bronx in New York City Fox Street Tiffany Hunts Point, Bronx section, predominantly a Jewish neighborhood at that Time. His father was a Merchant Marine and his mother Sylvia Valentin Ramirez, a working housewife. He lived across St. Athanasius Church (Bronx). At age 13 his mother died. He attended The High School of Music & Art. He learned percussion at an early age, and by 10 was playing conga and timbales professionally. When he was 12, he began to practice the flute so he could get to know a girl in school who played the flute, Irene Cathcart. He borrowed a flute, bought a Herbie Mann record, and started to teach himself. Years later, he recorded an album with Mann called Two Amigos. He took lessons from Hubert Laws, who became his mentor.

In the 1970s, Valentin combined Afro-Cuban, Brazilian, and funk with jazz with his ensemble which featured at various times Bill O'Connell (piano), Lincoln Goines and Ruben Rodriguez (bass), Richie Morales and Robby Ameen (drums), Sammy Figueroa and Giovanni Hidalgo (congas). He was the first musician signed to GRP Records, a label founded by Dave Grusin and Larry Rosen that specialized in smooth jazz, jazz fusion, and jazz-pop-Latin. He recorded his debut album with Ricardo Marrero in 1977. Over time he recorded with Noel Pointer, Patti Austin, Lee Ritenour, Chris Connor, David Benoit, Eliane Elias, and Nnenna Freelon. Until 1979, he was a schoolteacher.

For several years Valentin served as musical director for Tito Puente's Golden Latin Jazz All-Stars, and also toured with Manny Oquendo's Conjunto Libre. In 2000, he appeared in the documentary Calle 54 performing with Tito Puente's Orchestra.

For seven years in a row, he was chosen best jazz flautist by readers of Jazziz magazine. In 1985, he received a Grammy Award nomination as best R&B instrumentalist. In 2003, he won a Grammy for Caribbean Jazz Project, an album he did with Dave Samuels.

In March 2012, Valentin had a stroke which left him partially paralyzed and unable to perform. In 2015, he suffered a second stroke, and worked to overcome his disabilities in an extended-care facility.

On March 8, 2017, Valentin died from complications of a stroke and Parkinson's disease in the Bronx at the age of 64. His lifelong "special friend", Irene, for whom he learned to play the flute, was at his side when he passed.

== Discography ==
- Legends (GRP, 1978)
- The Hawk (GRP, 1979)
- Land of the Third Eye (GRP, 1980)
- I Got It Right This Time (Arista, 1981)
- Pied Piper (GRP, 1981)
- In Love's Time (Arista/GRP, 1982)
- Flute Juice (GRP, 1983)
- Kalahari (GRP, 1984)
- Jungle Garden (GRP, 1985)
- Light Struck (GRP, 1986)
- Mind Time (GRP, 1987)
- Live at the Blue Note (GRP, 1988)
- Two Amigos (GRP, 1990)
- Musical Portraits (GRP, 1992)
- Red Sun (GRP, 1993)
- Tropic Heat (GRP, 1994)
- Sunshower (Concord Jazz, 1999)
- Primitive Passions (RMM, 2005)
- World on a String (Highnote, 2005)
- Come Fly With Me (Highnote, 2006)
- Pure Imagination (Highnote, 2011)

With Steve Turre

- The Spirits Up Above (HighNote, 2004)

With the GRP All-Star Big Band

- GRP All-Star Big Band (GRP, 1992)

With Scott Cossu

- Islands (Windham Hill, 1984)
- Switchback (Windham Hill, 1989)
- Stained Glass Memories (Windham Hill, 1992)

With Karimata

- Dave Valentin (Aquarius Musikindo, 1990)
