= The Weather Channel Presents: The Best of Smooth Jazz =

Compilation album by various artists
- Released: October 9, 2007
- Genre: Smooth jazz
- Label: Midas

The Weather Channel chronology
The Weather Channel Presents: The Best of Smooth Jazz (2007)	The Weather Channel Presents: Smooth Jazz II (2008)

The Weather Channel Presents: The Best of Smooth Jazz is a 2007 compilation release by Midas Records. It peaked at No. 1 on Billboard's Top Contemporary Jazz charts in the same year.

The first CD from the Weather Channel heralded the network's entry into retail music. The network's music had been a source of interest for viewers, who had written in for years asking where they could purchase the music played during the "Local on the 8s" segment, broadcast 288 minutes each day. The 12-song compilation features the channel's most requested music.

== Track listing ==
1. "Shakin' the Shack" – Dave Koz (from the 1993 album Lucky Man)
2. "The Gift" – 3rd Force (from the 1994 album 3rd Force)
3. "Ocean View" – Pieces of a Dream (from the 1994 album Goodbye Manhattan)
4. "Holding Hands" – Ryan Farish (from the 2008 album Wonderfall)
5. "Windows" – Chick Corea (from the 1968 album Now He Sings, Now He Sobs)
6. "Mildred's Attraction" – Joyce Cooling (from the 2006 album Revolving Door)
7. "Sidewayz" – Najee (from the 2005 album My Point of View)
8. "Bad, Bad Simba" – Paprika Soul (from the 2001 album Paprika Soul)
9. "Wait a Minute" – Mark Krurnowski (from the 2010 album Olive Fingers)
10. "Simple Pleasure" – Jeanne Ricks
11. "Viaduct" – Four80East (from the 2001 album Nocturnal)
12. "Santa Monica Triangle" – Jeff Lorber (from the 2005 album Flipside)

== See also ==
- The Weather Channel Presents: Smooth Jazz II
