= Easy Street (album) =

Studio album by Eric Marienthal
- Released: 1997
- Recorded: 1997
- Genre: Jazz
- Length: 54:37
- Label: Verve
- Producer: Lee Ritenour

Eric Marienthal chronology
| Street Dance (1994) | Easy Street (1997) | Walk Tall (1998) |

Easy Street is an album by American jazz saxophonist Eric Marienthal released in 1997 and recorded for the Verve label. The album reached No. 13 on the Billboard Contemporary Jazz chart.

== Track listing ==
1. Easy Street (Lee Ritenour) – 5:17
2. Tuesday's Delight (John Beasley) – 4:41
3. New Jack Saturday (Marienthal/Ritenour) – 5:07
4. Until You Come Back to Me (Morris Broadnax/Clarence Paul/Stevie Wonder) – 4:24
5. Glow (Ritenour) – 5:06
6. Half and Half (Charles Davis) – 4:36
7. The Sun Died (Ray Charles) – 5:14
8. Last Day of Summer (Rob Mullins) – 5:33
9. Bourriquot (Beasley) – 4:35
10. Secret Passions (Jeff Lorber/Marienthal) – 5:03
11. Backstage (Marienthal/Mullins) – 4:59

== Personnel ==
- Eric Marienthal – saxophone
- Rick Braun – trumpet
- John Beasley – keyboards
- Don Grusin – keyboards
- Rob Mullins – keyboards
- Russell Ferrante – piano
- Lee Ritenour – guitar
- Melvin Lee Davis – bass
- Sonny Emory – drums
- Hilary Jones – drums
- Cassio Duarte – percussion
- Vesta Williams – vocals

== Charts ==
| Chart (1997) | Peak position |
|---|---|
| US Top Jazz Albums (Billboard) | 21 |
| US Top Contemporary Jazz Albums (Billboard) | 13 |
