= Prototype (Jeff Lorber album) =

Studio album by Jeff Lorber
- Released: March 24, 2017
- Studio: Cocoa Butt Studio (Culver City, California); JHL Sound (Pacific Palisades, California); Mannerism Studio (New York City, New York)
- Genre: Jazz, contemporary jazz
- Length: 49:30
- Label: Shanachie
- Producer: Jeff Lorber; Jimmy Haslip

Jeff Lorber chronology
Step It Up (2015)	Prototype (2017)	Impact (2018)

Professional ratings
Review scores
Source	Rating
AllMusic	3.5/5 stars

Prototype is an album by the Jeff Lorber Fusion that was released on March 24, 2017. The album earned the group a Grammy Award for Best Contemporary Instrumental Album.

== Track listing ==
All songs written by Jeff Lorber. "Hidden Agenda" co-written with Jimmy Haslip.

No.	Title	Length
1.	"Hyperdrive"	4:56
2.	"Prototype"	5:22
3.	"Test Drive"	5:19
4.	"What's the Deal"	4:47
5.	"Vienna"	5:56
6.	"The Badness"	5:10
7.	"Hidden Agenda"	5:00
8.	"Gucci"	5:00
9.	"Park West"	4:09
10.	"River Song"	3:51

== Personnel ==
- Jeff Lorber – keyboards, guitars (3, 7, 9), synth bass (3, 4, 6, 8, 9)
- Paul Jackson, Jr. – guitars (1, 7, 8), rhythm guitar (1, 7, 8), guitar solo (7)
- Chuck Loeb – melody guitar (1)
- Michael Thompson – guitars (2–4, 6–10)
- Jairus Mozee – guitars (3, 4)
- Larry Koonse – guitars (5, 8), guitar solo (5, 8)
- Nathan East – bass (1)
- Jimmy Haslip – electric bass (2–4, 6, 7, 9, 10), bass (5)
- Gary Novak – drums
- Andy Snitzer – alto saxophone (1–3, 6–9), tenor saxophone (4, 5), soprano saxophone (8, 10)
- David Mann – horns (1–4, 6, 7, 9), horn arrangements (1–4, 6, 7, 9), orchestra and string arrangements (10)

== Production ==
- Jimmy Haslip – producer
- Jeff Lorber – producer, recording, mixing (1, 2, 5, 7, 10)
- Peter Mokran – mixing (3, 4, 6, 8, 9)
- Michael Thompson – guitar recording (2–4, 6–10)
- David Mann – horn recording (1–4, 6, 7, 9)
- Gavin Lurssen – mastering at Lurssen Mastering (Hollywood, California)
- Raifi Minasian – graphic and package design
- Alex Solca – photography
- Suzu Takeda – web mistress
- Bud Harner – management
- Alle Paone – management
- Chapman & Co. – management company

== Charts ==
Chart	Peak position
US Top Jazz Albums (Billboard)	6
