= GRP All-Star Big Band =

American big band

The GRP All-Star Big Band was a contemporary big band assembled in the late 1980s by Dave Grusin and Larry Rosen, the founders of GRP Records. The band played new arrangements of popular jazz pieces from the 1950s and 1960s.

Its albums GRP All-Star Big Band and Dave Grusin Presents GRP All-Star Big Band Live! were nominated for Grammys, and its album All Blues won the 1995 Grammy Award for Best Large Jazz Ensemble Album.

== Band members ==
- Randy Brecker – trumpet
- Chuck Findley – trumpet
- Sal Marquez – trumpet
- Arturo Sandoval – trumpet
- Byron Stripling – trumpet
- George Bohanon – trombone
- Timmy Capello – saxophone
- Eric Marienthal – first alto saxophone
- Nelson Rangell – second alto saxophone
- Bob Mintzer – first tenor saxophone
- Ernie Watts – second tenor saxophone
- Tom Scott – baritone saxophone
- Phillip Bent – flute
- Dave Valentin – flute
- Eddie Daniels – clarinet
- David Benoit – piano
- Chick Corea – piano
- Russell Ferrante – piano
- Dave Grusin – piano
- Kenny Kirkland – piano
- Ramsey Lewis – piano
- Gary Burton – vibraphone
- Lee Ritenour – guitar
- John Patitucci – double bass
- Dave Weckl – drum set
- Carlos Vega - drums
- Alex Acuña – percussion
- Larry Williams - keyboards, sax

== Discography ==
- Dave Grusin Presents GRP All-Stars Live in Japan (1980)
- GRP All-Star Big Band (1992)
- Dave Grusin Presents GRP All-Star Big Band Live! (1993)
- All Blues (1995)
