= Blue Train (composition) =

Jazz standard composed by John Coltrane

"Blue Train" is a 1958 jazz standard composed by John Coltrane. It is the lead track on the album of the same name. Rather than having either a major or minor quality, it contains both by using an E♭^{7♯9} chord, utilizing both the major and minor 3rd.

== Personnel ==
- John Coltrane - Tenor saxophone
- Lee Morgan - Trumpet
- Curtis Fuller - Trombone
- Kenny Drew - Piano
- Paul Chambers - Standup Bass
- Philly Joe Jones - Drums
