= Inner City Records =

American record label founded in 1976

- Parent company: Music Minus One
- Founded: 1976
- Founder: Irv Kratka
- Status: Inactive
- Genre: Jazz Hip-Hop/Rap
- Country of origin: U.S.
- Location: New York City

Inner City Records was a jazz record company and label founded by Irv Kratka in 1976 in New York City.

The company was a division of Music Minus One and also owned the label Classic Jazz. It started with reissues, then moved on to new recordings covering various types of jazz. Other non-jazz labels it released under the Inner City Records umbrella included Aural Explorer and City Sounds.

Inner City Records released over 60 albums between 1976 and 1980 and was voted the 1979 Record Label of the Year in the International Jazz Critics Poll.

Many Inner City albums were also issued on the Japanese East Wind Records, including Sam Morrison's Dune, The Three (Joe Sample, Ray Brown, Shelly Manne), and albums from Japanese musicians Sadao Watanabe and Terumasa Hino. Additional international labels licensed for release in the US include SteepleChase Records, Black & Blue, Vogue, and Enja. A three volume series of Django Reinhardt recordings licensed from Pathe Marconi included "Quintet of the Hot Club of France," which was nominated for a Grammy for Best Historical Recording.

Original Inner City Records productions included releases by Eddie Jefferson, Jeff Lorber, Dan Siegel, Listen featuring Mel Martin, Dry Jack, Sun Ra, Michel Urbaniak, Urzula Dudziak, and Susannah McCorkle.

== Roster ==
- Archie Shepp
- Dry Jack*
- Nat Adderley
- Toshiko Akiyoshi
- Art Ensemble of Chicago
- Chet Baker
- Gato Barbieri
- Louie Bellson
- Paul Bley
- Anthony Braxton
- Clifford Brown
- David Friedman
- David Friesen
- Dexter Gordon
- Eddie Jefferson
- Jeff Lorber
- Cecil McBee
- Susannah McCorkle
- Cam Newton
- New York Jazz Quartet
- Django Reinhardt
- Judy Roberts
- Jerry Rusch
- Dan Siegel
- Memphis Slim
- Roosevelt Sykes
- Lew Tabackin
- Lennie Tristano
- Young Ed
