= Eric Marienthal =

American jazz saxophonist (born 1957)

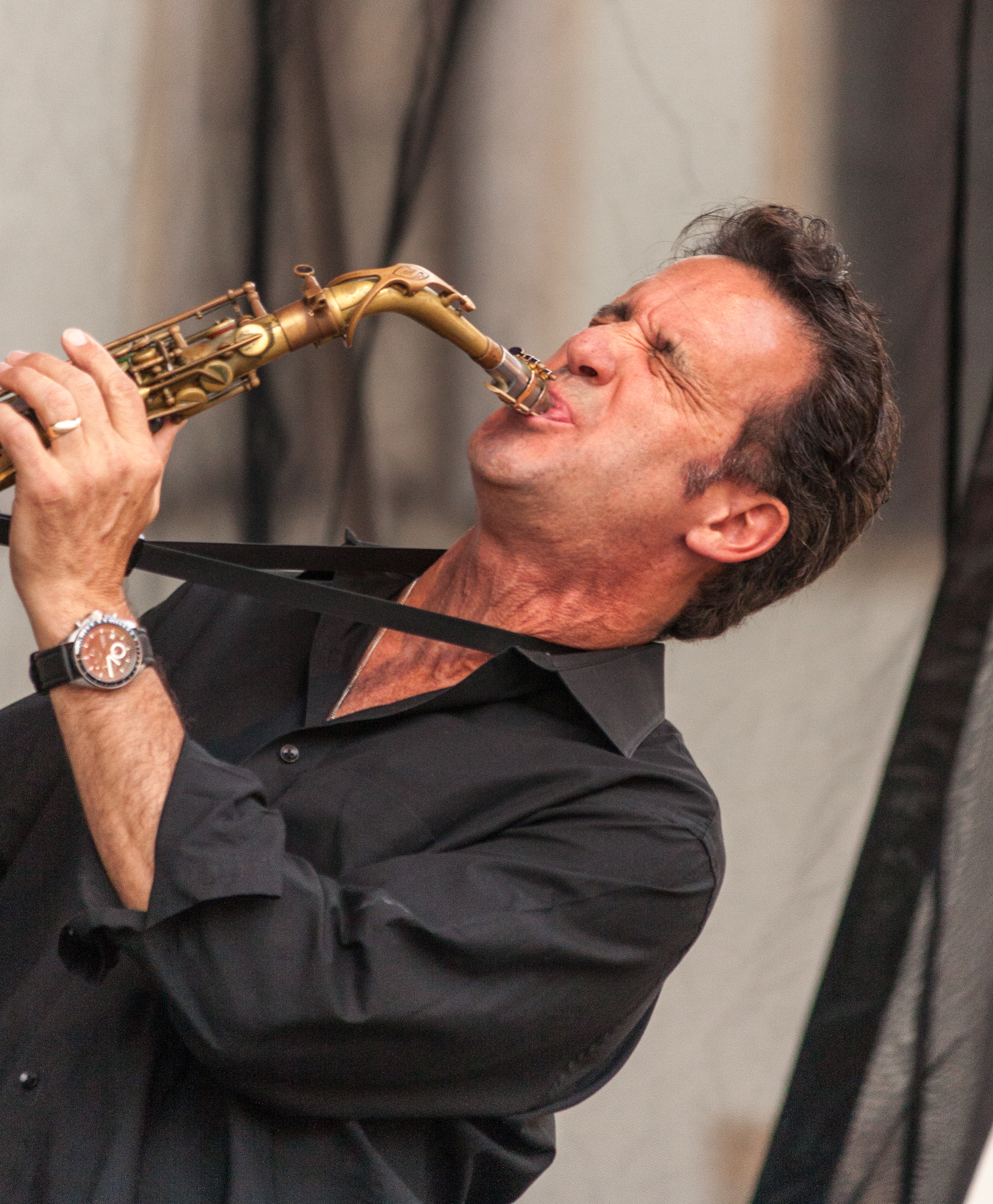
- Marienthal in 2012

Background information
- Born: December 19, 1957 (age 68); Sacramento, California, U.S.
- Genres: Jazz
- Occupation: Musician
- Instrument: Saxophone
- Labels: GRP, PolyGram, Peak
- Website: ericmarienthal.com

Eric Marienthal (born December 19, 1957) is an American Grammy Award-nominated contemporary saxophonist based in Los Angeles, best known for his work in the jazz, jazz fusion, smooth jazz, and pop genres.

== Early life ==
Eric Marienthal was born on December 19, 1957, in Sacramento, California, to Robert Marienthal, an insurance salesman, but moved to San Mateo when he was two years old. He has credited his enthusiasm for music on being taught music while in school, and picked up the saxophone in the fourth grade after he thought it looked "pretty cool". Marienthal has also mentioned his father was a fan of music, particularly 1940s and 1950s such as Boots Randolph, Nat King Cole and Frank Sinatra. He initially wanted to pick up the trumpet but a teacher discouraged him because of his braces. As Marienthal progressed, his father bought him a $400 Selmer saxophone and enrolled him in Corona Del Mar High School. Throughout his education, Marienthal also learned to play guitar (in grade school), flute, clarinet (both high school) and piano (college).

After graduating from high school in Southern California in 1976, he studied at the Berklee College of Music, where he studied with the saxophone professor, Joe Viola. By the time he left Berklee, Eric had achieved the highest proficiency rating given by the school.

== Career ==
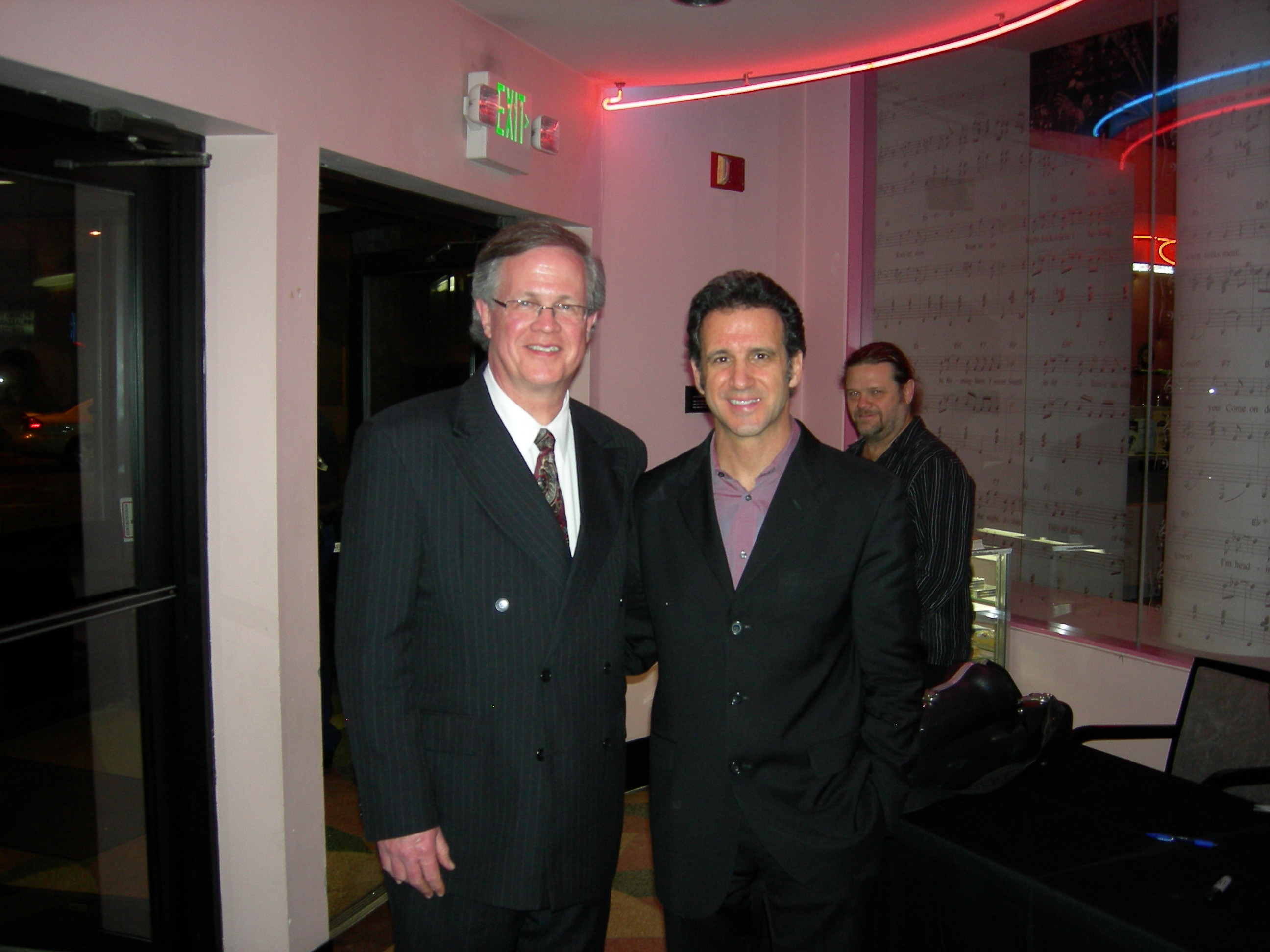
Marienthal (right) with Ray Reach, Director of Student Jazz Programs for the Alabama Jazz Hall of Fame

Marienthal started his professional career in 1980 with famed New Orleans trumpeter Al Hirt. After returning to Los Angeles, Eric became a member of the Chick Corea Elektric Band. Marienthal has stated that he was a Chick Corea fan even before he started performing with him. He recorded six albums with that band and two of them won Grammy Awards.

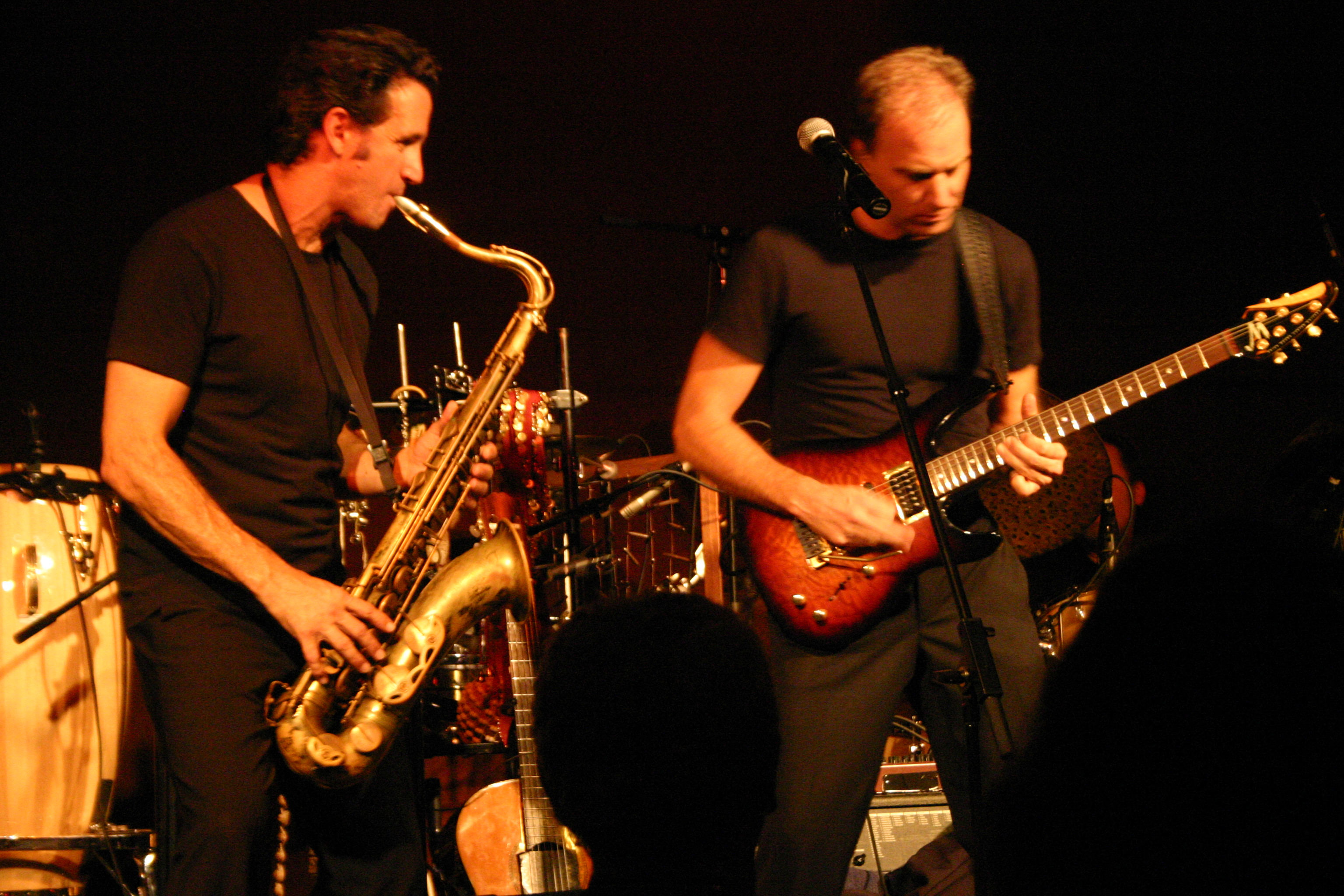
Marienthal (left) and Russ Freeman

Marienthal has also written instructional books, including Comprehensive Jazz Studies & Exercises, The Ultimate Jazz Play Along, and The Music of Eric Marienthal and instructional videos, including Play Sax From Day One, Modern Sax and Tricks of the Trade, all published by Warner Brothers Publications, which is now Alfred Publishing/Belwin Jazz. Every summer since 1999, he has put on an annual fundraising concert for High Hopes Head Injury Program, a non-profit organization in Orange County, California, that works with people who have suffered traumatic head injuries.

Marienthal occupies the lead alto chair of Gordon Goodwin's Big Phat Band, playing alto saxophone, soprano saxophone, flute, and piccolo.

In 2012, Marienthal released the album It's Love, produced by guitarist Chuck Loeb, who also appears on the tracks. The studio band includes keyboardist Russell Ferrante, drummer Gary Novak, and bassist Tim Lefebvre.

From 2010 to 2013, Marienthal was part of the re-constitued Jeff Lorber Fusion, both touring with the band and appearing on albums Now Is the Time, Galaxy and Hacienda.

== Equipment ==
- Selmer Mark VI Alto Saxophone with a "Eric Marienthal Special" mouthpiece with a size 7 (.085 inch) tip opening and ishimori woodstone ligature
- Yamaha Custom Z Alto Saxophone with a Beechler Metal No. 7 mouthpiece and 'Olegature' ligature
- Selmer Mark VI Tenor Saxophone with a Berg Larsen Metal 100/2 mouthpiece and Brancher ligature
- Yamaha YSS 62 Soprano Saxophone with a Selmer Super Session #H mouthpiece and Harrison ligature
- Muramatsu Flute
- Vandoren traditional 2.5 reeds

== Select discography ==
=== Albums ===
Year	Title	Peak chart positions		Label
Year	Title	US Jazz	US Con. Jazz	Label
1988	Voices of the Heart	—	—	GRP
1989	Round Trip	—	—	GRP
1990	Crossroads	—	—	GRP
1991	Oasis	—	5	GRP
1993	One Touch	—	11	GRP
1994	Street Dance	13	9	GRP
1997	Collection	—	—	GRP
1997	Easy Street	21	13	PolyGram/Verve
1998	Walk Tall	16	13	PolyGram/Verve
2001	Turn Up the Heat	17	10	Peak
2003	Sweet Talk	48	—	Peak
2005	Got You Covered	—	—	Peak
2007	Just Around the Corner	25	12	Peak
2012	It's Love	14	6	Peak
2015	Bridges (with Chuck Loeb)	15	6	Shanachie
2020	Double Dealin' (with Randy Brecker)	—	—	Shanachie
"—" denotes a recording that did not chart.

=== Charted singles ===
Year	Title	Peak chart positions	Album
Year	Title	Smooth Jazz Airplay	Album
2007	"Blue Water"	1	Just Around the Corner
2012	"Get Here"	11	It's Love
2015	"Crossing" (Eric Marienthal and Chuck Loeb)	21	Bridges – (with Chuck Loeb)
2016	"I Can't Stop My Heart" (John Novello featuring Eric Marienthal)	11	Ivory Soul – (John Novello)
2019	"Good to Go" (John Novello featuring Eric Marienthal)	1	Good to Go – (John Novello)
2026	"Morning Light" (Brian Culbertson featuring Eric Marienthal)	4	Day Trip – (Brian Culbertson)

=== As a leader ===
- 1988: Voices of the Heart (GRP)
- 1989: Round Trip (GRP)
- 1990: Crossroads (GRP)
- 1991: Oasis (GRP)
- 1993: One Touch (GRP)
- 1994: Street Dance (GRP)
- 1997: Easy Street (PolyGram/Verve)
- 1997: Collection (GRP)
- 1998: Walk Tall (Verve)
- 2001: Turn Up the Heat (Peak)
- 2003: Sweet Talk (Peak)
- 2005: Got You Covered (Peak)
- 2007: Just Around the Corner (Peak)
- 2012: It's Love (Peak/Entertainment One)
- 2015: Bridges with Chuck Loeb (Shanachie)
- 2020: Double Dealin' (with Randy Brecker, Shanachie Records)

=== As a sideman ===
With David Benoit

- 1989: Urban Daydreams
- 1994: Shaken Not Stirred
- 1997: American Landscape

With Brian Bromberg

- 2009: It Is What It Is

With Matt Catingub

- 1984: Your Friendly Neighborhood Big Band
- 1985: Hi-Tech Big Band

With Chick Corea

- 1987: Light Years
- 1988: Eye of the Beholder
- 1990: Inside Out
- 1991: Beneath the Mask
- 1993: Electric Band II: Paint the World
- 2004: To the Stars
- 2023: The Future is Now

With Brian Culbertson

- 2008: Bringing Back the Funk
- 2009: Live from the Inside
- 2014: Another Long Night Out

With Gordon Goodwin

- 2000: Swingin' for the Fences
- 2003: XXL
- 2006: The Phat Pack
- 2006: Bah, Humduck! A Looney Tunes Christmas
- 2008: Act Your Age
- 2009: Dave Siebels with Gordon Goodwin's Big Phat Band
- 2011: That's How We Roll
- 2014: Life in the Bubble
- 2015: Wrap This!
- 2016: An Elusive Man
- 2019: The Gordian Knot
- 2021: The Reset
- 2023: Raymond Scott Reimagined with Quartet San Francisco

With GRP All-Star Big Band

- 1992: GRP All-Star Big Band
- 1993: Dave Grusin Presents GRP All-Star Big Band Live!
- 1995: All Blues

With Roger Neumann

- 1983: Introducing Roger Neumann’s Rather Large Band

With Dave Weckl

- 1990: Master Plan
- 1992: Heads Up

With Michael Franks

- 2006: Rendezvous In Rio
- 2011: On Time Together
- 2018: On The Music in My Head

=== As a guest ===
With The Rippingtons

- 1996: Brave New World
- 2000: Life in the Tropics
- 2002: Live Across America
- 2003: Let it Ripp
