= Jeff Lorber =

American jazz keyboardist (born 1952)

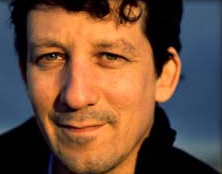

Background information
- Born: Jeffrey H. Lorber; November 4, 1952 (age 73); Philadelphia, Pennsylvania, U.S.
- Genres: Jazz, smooth jazz, jazz pop, jazz fusion
- Occupations: Musician, composer, record producer
- Instrument: Keyboards
- Years active: 1975–present
- Labels: Inner City, Blue Note, Narada, Zebra, Verve, Warner Bros., Arista, Peak

Jeffrey H. Lorber (born November 4, 1952) is an American keyboardist, composer, and record producer. After six previous nominations, Lorber won his first Grammy Award on January 28, 2018 for Best Contemporary Instrumental Album for Prototype by his band the Jeff Lorber Fusion.

Many of his songs have appeared on the Weather Channel's Local on the 8s segments and on the channel's compilation albums, The Weather Channel Presents: The Best of Smooth Jazz and The Weather Channel Presents: Smooth Jazz II. He was nominated for a Grammy Award for his album He Had a Hat (Blue Note, 2007)

== Early life ==
Lorber was born to a Jewish family in Cheltenham, Pennsylvania, the same suburb as Michael and Randy Brecker, with whom he would later play. He started to play the piano when he was four years old. After playing in a number of R&B bands as a teen, he attended Berklee College of Music, where he developed his love for jazz. At Berklee, he met and played alongside guitarist John Scofield. Lorber moved to Vancouver, Washington, in 1972. For several years, he studied chemistry at Boston University.

== Jeff Lorber Fusion ==
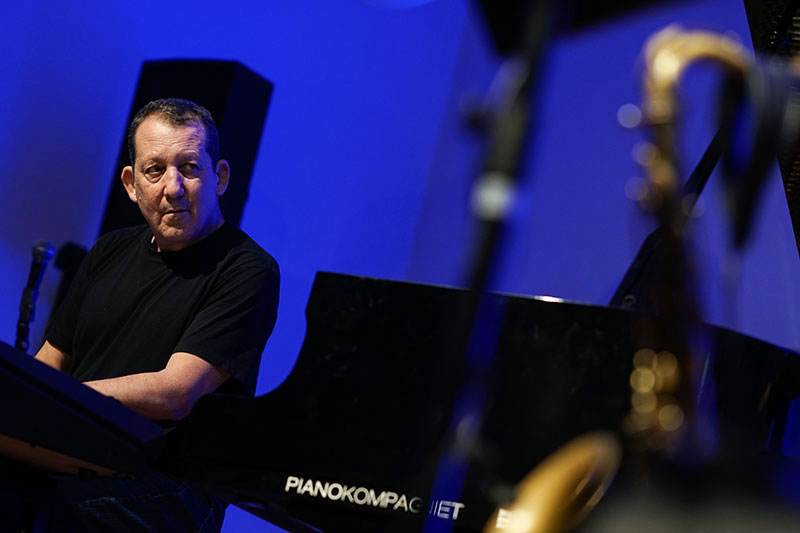
Lorber at Jazzy Days in Denmark, 2018

His first group, the Jeff Lorber Fusion, released their self-titled debut album The Jeff Lorber Fusion in 1977 on Inner City Records. Supported by a revolving cast of musicians, including drummer Dennis Bradford, he recorded five studio albums under this moniker. These early albums showcased a funky sound influenced by other jazz fusion practitioners such as Herbie Hancock, Weather Report, and Return to Forever, the latter's Chick Corea appearing on several songs. Like his contemporaries, Lorber performed on multiple keyboard instruments, including piano, Rhodes piano, and analog synthesizers, often favoring the Minimoog and Sequential Circuits Prophet 5. The Jeff Lorber Fusion's 1980 album, Wizard Island, introduced saxophonist Kenneth Bruce Gorelick, better known as Kenny G.

== Solo career ==
In 1984, Lorber released his second solo album, In the Heat of the Night, and Jeff Lorber Fusion compilation album Lift Off. Later that year, he and the production duo of David Frank and Mic Murphy, otherwise known as the System, produced Step by Step. The title track, written with Anita Pointer of the Pointer Sisters, rose to number 31 on the U.S. Billboard R&B chart. The song "Facts of Love" (featuring Karyn White) from the 1986 album Private Passion was his biggest chart hit, reaching No. 27 on the Billboard Hot 100 and No. 17 on the R&B chart. Several singles from this period also appeared on the Billboard Dance charts. However, Lorber was not satisfied that he was being overtaken by a more vocal and R&B feel on his own albums, so he took a seven-year hiatus. After Step by Step, he quoted Clive Davis as telling him, "We really want you to put more vocals on your records", which Lorber thought was a mistake.

Lorber's keyboard work appeared in the video game Castlevania: Symphony of the Night. His input can be heard during the game's closing theme song "I Am the Wind" (which also featured the saxophonist Gerald Albright).

Two greatest hits compilation albums were released in 2000 and 2002. Flipside (2005) was nominated for a Grammy Award in the Best Pop Instrumental Album category. At the 56th Annual Grammy Awards, his 2013 album Hacienda was nominated for Best Pop Instrumental Album. In 2018, he received a Grammy for his album Prototype in the Best Contemporary Instrumental Album category.

Lorber has done extensive production and session work for other musicians, including Dave Koz, Eric Benét, Herb Alpert, Carol Duboc and Laura Branigan. He hosts a show on Sirius Satellite Radio.

== Personal life ==
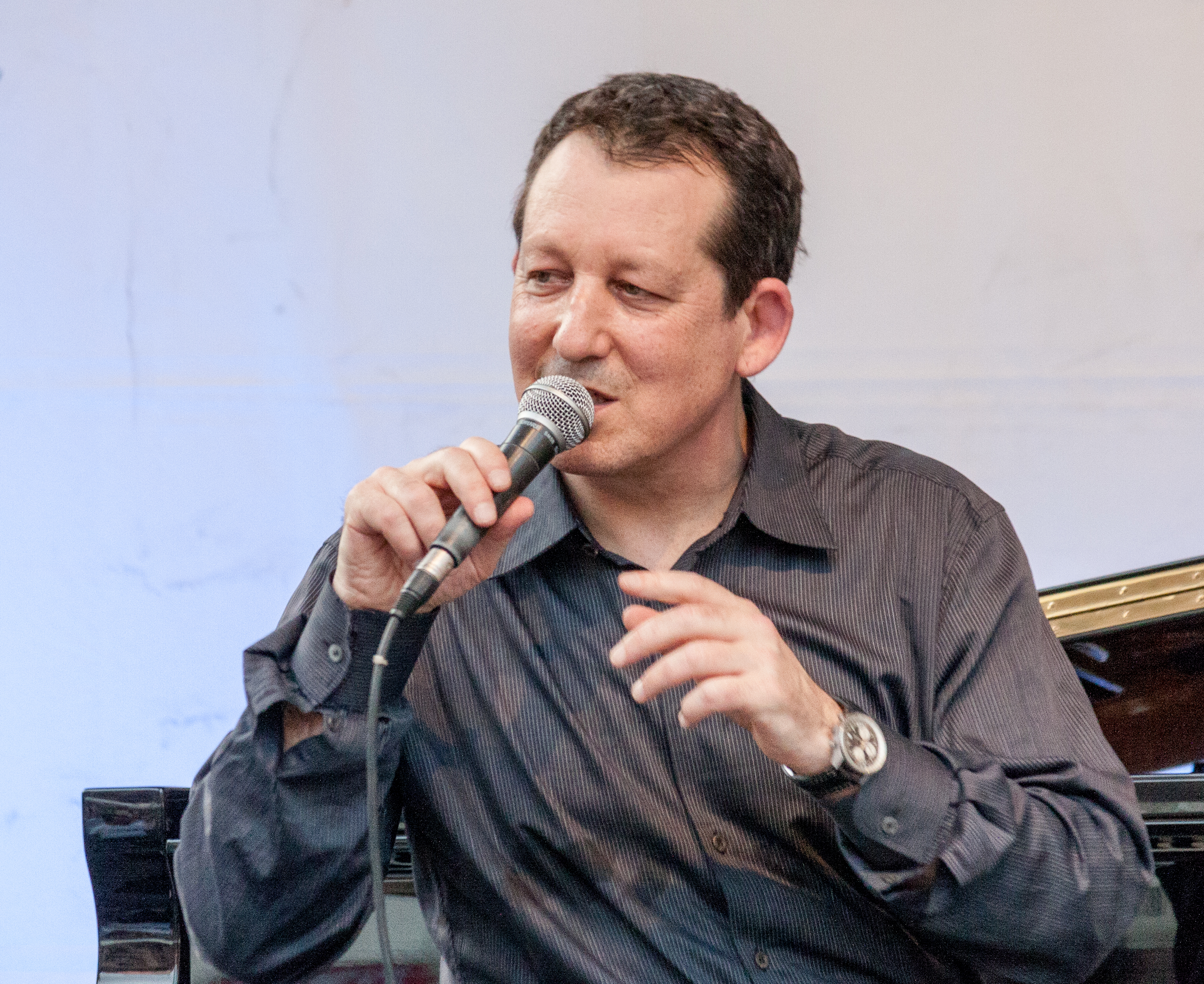
Lorber in 2012

In 2004, Lorber was diagnosed with polycystic kidney disease and received a successful kidney transplant from his wife Mink Lorber.

He has served as a spokesman for the PKD Foundation, an organization for fighting polycystic kidney disease. He has mentioned that the disease is common in his family. His daughters have it and his mother and sister died from it.

== Discography ==
=== Albums ===
- 1977: The Jeff Lorber Fusion
- 1978: Soft Space
- 1979: Water Sign
- 1980: Wizard Island
- 1981: Galaxian
- 1982: It's A Fact
- 1984: In the Heart of the Night
- 1985: Step By Step
- 1986: Private Passion
- 1993: Worth Waiting For
- 1994: West Side Stories
- 1996: State Of Grace
- 2000: The Definitive Collection
- 2001: Kickin' It
- 2002: The Very Best Of Jeff Lorber
- 2003: Philly Style
- 2005: Flipside
- 2007: He Had A Hat
- 2008: Heard That
- 2010: Now Is The Time
- 2012: Galaxy
- 2013: Hacienda
- 2014: Lift Off
- 2015: Step It Up
- 2015: BOP
- 2017: Prototype
- 2018: Impact
- 2021: Space-Time
- 2023: The Drop
- 2024: Elevate

Jazz Funk Soul
(Jeff Lorber, Everette Harp, Chuck Loeb (2014—2017),
and [Loeb's replacement] Paul Jackson, Jr.)

Year	Title	Label	Chart positions	
Year	Title	Label	US Trad Jazz	US Cont Jazz
2014	Jazz Funk Soul	Shanachie	5	2
2016	More Serious Business	Shanachie	7	2
2019	Life and Times	Shanachie	6	2
2022	Forecast	Shanachie	—	—
2025	Simpatico	Shanachie	—	—
"—" denotes releases that did not chart.

=== Singles ===
Solo

Year	Title	Chart positions				
Year	Title	US	US R&B	US Dance	US Jazz	UK
1985	"Step by Step"	105	31	4	—	—
1985	"Best Part of the Night"	—	—	15	—	80
1986	"Facts of Love"	27	17	9	—	95
1987	"True Confessions"	—	88	—	—	—
2006	"Ooh La La"	—	—	—	4	—
2007	"Anthem for a New America"	—	—	—	21	—
2008	"Rehab"	—	—	—	12	—
2009	"You Got Something"	—	—	—	5	—
2010	"Pixel"	—	—	—	22	—
2011	"Sumatra"	—	—	—	39	—
2013	"Right There"	—	—	—	45	—
"—" denotes releases that did not chart.

Jeff Lorber Fusion

Year	Title	Chart positions
Year	Title	US Jazz
2012	"Big Brother"	1
2012	"City"	5
2013	"Hacienda"	1
2014	"Fab Gear"	1
2015	"The Steppe"	1
2015	"Get Up"	3
2016	"Soul Party"	11
2017	"Hyperdrive"	2
2018	"The Badness"	5
2018	"Sport Coat Makes Good"	8
2019	"Highline"	24

Jazz Funk Soul

Year	Title	Chart positions	Album
Year	Title	Smooth Jazz Airplay	Album
2014	"Serious Business"	1	Jazz Funk Soul
2015	"Speed of Light"	20	Jazz Funk Soul
2016	"You'll Know When You Know"	21	More Serious Business
2017	"Tuesday Swings"	7	More Serious Business
2019	"Windfall"	3	Life and Times
2019	"Blacksmith"	23	Life and Times
2022	"Hustle"	4	Forecast
2023	"Forecast"	7	Forecast
2025	"Over Easy"	4	Simpatico
2026	"Simpatico"	6	Simpatico
