= The Best of David Benoit 1987–1995 =

Compilation album by David Benoit
- Released: October 24, 1995
- Recorded: 1987–1995
- Studio: Various
- Genre: Jazz
- Length: 65:58
- Label: GRP Records
- Producer: David Benoit; Nathan East; Marcel East; Jeffrey Weber; Allen Sides; Mike Abene; Seth Marshall; Don Grusin; Russ Freeman

David Benoit chronology
Shaken Not Stirred (1994)	The Best of David Benoit 1987–1995 (1995)	Remembering Christmas (1996)

Professional ratings
Review scores
Source	Rating
AllMusic	2/5 stars

The Best of David Benoit 1987–1995 is an album by American pianist David Benoit released in 1994, recorded for the GRP label. The album reached #25 on Billboard's Jazz chart.
The Best of David Benoit 1987–1995 is a retrospective of Benoit's GRP releases, and also contains some previously unreleased material.

== Track listing ==
No.	Title	Writer(s)	Original Album	Length
1.	"Drive Time"	David Benoit; Marcel East; Nathan East	Previously Unreleased	4:36
2.	"Every Step of the Way"	David Benoit; Russ Freeman	Every Step of the Way (1988)	4:02
3.	"Cast Your Fate to the Wind"	Vince Guaraldi; Carel Werber	Waiting for Spring (1989)	3:13
4.	"Searching For June"	David Benoit; Russ Freeman	Previously Unreleased	4:41
5.	"M.W.A. (Musicians With Attitude)"	David Benoit; Marcel East; Nathan East	Inner Motion (1990)	4:36
6.	"Linus and Lucy"	Vince Guaraldi	Happy Anniversary, Charlie Brown (1989)	3:28
7.	"Kei's Song"	David Benoit	Freedom at Midnight (1987)	4:36
8.	"The Key to You"	David Benoit; David Pack	Every Step of the Way	5:01
9.	"Freedom At Midnight"	David Benoit; Nathan East	Freedom At Midnight	4:10
10.	"Still Standing"	David Benoit; Nathan East	Shadows (1991)	5:11
11.	"Wailea"	David Benoit	Shaken Not Stirred	4:29
12.	"Letter To Evan"	Bill Evans	Letter to Evan (1992)	5:12
13.	"Urban Daydreams"	David Benoit	Urban Daydreams (1989)	5:48
14.	"Mediterranean Nights"	David Benoit; Russ Freeman	The Benoit/Freeman Project (1994)	6:55
Total length:				65:58

== Personnel ==
Tracks 1 & 4

- David Benoit – acoustic piano, keyboards, Hammond B3 organ, string arrangements and conductor (4)
- Paul Jackson Jr. – guitars
- Nathan East – bass
- Ricky Lawson – drums
- Michael Fisher – percussion
- Eric Marienthal – alto saxophone, soprano saxophone
- Charles Loper – trombone (1)
- Gary Grant – trumpet (1)
- Jerry Hey – trumpet (1), horn arrangements (1)
- Ken Gruberman – string contractor (4), copyist (4)
- Bruce Dukov – concertmaster (4)

== Production ==
- Carl Griffin – album compilation and sequencing
- Dave Grusin – executive producer (2, 3, 5–14)
- Larry Rosen – executive producer (2, 3, 5–14)
- David Benoit – producer (1–5, 8, 11–14), co-producer (10)
- Marcel East – producer (1, 10)
- Nathan East – producer (1)
- Jeffrey Weber – producer (2, 3, 7–9, 12), co-producer (11)
- Allen Sides – producer (5)
- Mike Abene – producer (6)
- Gretchen Hoffman-Abene – associate producer (6)
- Seth Marshall – co-producer (7, 9)
- Don Grusin – producer (13)
- Russ Freeman – producer (14)
- Tim Aller – project coordinator (1, 4)
- Dan Serrano – art direction, Illustration
- Jason Claiborne – graphic design
- Tracy Lamonica – photography
- The Fitzgerald Hartley Co. – management

Technical

- Ted Jensen – mastering at Sterling Sound (New York City, New York)
- Joseph Doughney – digital editing at The Review Room (New York City, New York)
- Will Hawkins – digital editing assistant

Tracks 1 & 4

- Clark Germain – engineer, remixing
- Omie Craden – assistant engineer
- Richard "Segal" Huredia – remix assistant

Tracks 2, 3 & 5–14

- Bob Loftus – recording (2, 7–9)
- Allen Sides – recording (2, 3, 5–9, 12), mixing (5)
- Clark Germain – recording (10), engineer (11), mixing (11)
- Khaliq Glover – recording (10)
- Rik Pekkonen – recording (10)
- Don Murray – engineer (13), mixing (13)

Track information and credits adapted from AllMusic, then verified from the album's liner notes.

== Charts ==
Chart (1995)	Peak position
US Top Jazz Albums (Billboard)	25
