= Shaken Not Stirred (David Benoit album) =

Studio album by David Benoit
- Released: September 27, 1994
- Recorded: February 1994
- Studio: 29th Street Studio (Torrance, California); Ocean Way Recording (Hollywood, California)
- Genre: Jazz
- Length: 46:07
- Label: GRP
- Producer: David Benoit; Jeffrey Weber

David Benoit chronology
| The Benoit/Freeman Project (1994) | Shaken Not Stirred (1994) | The Best of David Benoit 1987-1995 (1995) |

Shaken Not Stirred is an album by American pianist David Benoit released in 1994, recorded for the GRP label. The album reached #14 on Billboard's Jazz chart.

== Track listing ==
All tracks written by David Benoit, except as noted.

1. "Wailea" - 4:29
2. "I Went to Bat for You" - 4:29
3. "Any Other Time" (David Benoit, David Pack) - 5:05
4. "Carmel" - 3:10
5. "Sparks Flew" - 4:23
6. "Shaken Not Stirred" - 5:39
7. "Chi Chi's Eyes" - 4:45
8. "Days of Old" (David Benoit, Lorraine Feather) - 4:27
9. "Jacqueline" - 3:31
10. "Sarah's Theme" - 6:10

== Personnel ==
- David Benoit – acoustic piano, synthesizer programming, Rhodes electric piano (1), Roland Rhodes MK80 (2, 6, 8), synth bass (2, 6), Fender Rhodes (3), electronic percussion (3)
- Peter Sprague – guitar (1, 5)
- Kim Stone – bass (1, 4, 5)
- Joe Peña – bass (2, 6)
- Steve Bailey – bass (3)
- Dave Enos – bass (7, 10), Arco bass (7)
- Tony Morales – drums (1, 4, 5), pencil effects (5)
- Simon Phillips – drums (2, 6)
- George Perilli – drums (3)
- David Anderson – cymbals (7), drums (10)
- Brad Dutz – percussion (3, 7)
- Chris Trujillo – percussion (6)
- Eric Marienthal – alto saxophone (2, 10)
- Missy Hanson – cello (3)
- Tommy Morgan – harmonica (8)
- Morgan Ames – vocals (1), vocal arrangements (1)
- Clydene Jackson – vocals (1)
- Darlene Koldenhoven – vocals (1)
- Carmen Twillie – vocals (1)
- David Pack – vocals (3)
- Kenny Rankin – vocals (8)

Orchestrations (Tracks 4, 7 & 8)

- David Benoit – arrangements, conductor (4, 7)
- Susie Katayama – music contractor
- Ken Gruberman – music contractor, music preparation
- Michael Clarke – score supervisor (4)

Brass and Woodwinds

- Gary Gray – clarinet (4), bass clarinet (4)
- Charles Bolto – clarinet (7)
- Louise Di Tullio – flute (4)
- Valerie King – flute (4)
- Steve Kujala – piccolo flute (4)
- Brice Martin – piccolo flute (4, 7), pan flutes (4), flute (7)
- Joe Meyer, James Thatcher, Richard Todd and Brad Warnaar – French horn (4)
- Steven Holtman, Alan Kaplan and Robert Payne – trombone (4)
- Rick Baptist, Wayne Bergeron and Gregory Prechel – trumpet (4)
- Norman Pearson – tuba (4)

Strings

- Larry Corbett – cello (4, 7, 8)
- Douglas Davis – cello (4)
- Susie Katayama – cello (4)
- Armen Ksajikian – cello (4)
- Roger Lebow – cello (4)
- Chuck Berghofer – double bass (4)
- Ami Egglison – double bass (4)
- Richard Feves – double bass (4)
- Susan Ranney – double bass (4)
- Gayle Levant – harp (4, 7, 8)
- Robert Becker – viola (4)
- Denyse Buffum – viola (4)
- Pamela Goldsmith – viola (4)
- Roland Kato – viola (4)
- James Ross – viola (4)
- Evan Wilson – viola (4)
- Vicki Miskolczy – viola (7, 8)
- Israel Baker – violin (4)
- Ron Clark – violin (4)
- Bruce Dukov – violin (4), concertmaster (4)
- Henry Ferber – violin (4)
- Armen Garabedian – violin (4)
- Berj Garabedian – violin (4)
- Endre Granat – violin (4)
- Gwen Heller – violin (4)
- Karen Jones – violin (4)
- Peter Kent – violin (4, 7, 8)
- Ezra Kilger – violin (4)
- Miran Kojian – violin (4)
- Brian Leonard – violin (4)
- Joy Lyle – violin (4)
- Michael Markman – violin (4)
- Ralph Morrison – violin (4)
- Robert Peterson – violin (4)
- Barbara Porter – violin (4)
- Rachel Robinson – violin (4)
- Guillermo Romero – violin (4)
- Anatoly Rosinsky – violin (4)
- Mark Sazer – violin (4)
- John Wittenberg – violin (4)
- Sid Page – violin (7, 8), concertmaster (7, 8)

Percussion

- Larry Bunker – percussion (4)
- Alan Varvin – percussion (4), timpani (7)
- Bob Zimmitti – percussion (4)

== Production ==
- Dave Grusin – executive producer
- Larry Rosen – executive producer
- David Benoit – producer
- Jeffrey Weber – co-producer
- Clark Germain – engineer, mixing
- Mike Brink – second engineer
- David Brock – second engineer
- Randy Festejo – second engineer
- Mark Guilbeault – second engineer
- Bill Winnett – second engineer
- Tim Aller – additional engineer
- Bill Drescher – additional engineer
- Ross Pallone – additional engineer
- Bernie Grundman – mastering at Bernie Grundman Mastering (Hollywood, California)
- Joseph Doughney – post-production
- Michael Landy – post-production
- The Review Room (New York City, New York) – post-production location
- Dianna Mich – personal assistant
- Cara Bridgins – GRP production coordinator
- Joseph Moore – production coordinating assistant
- Sonny Mediana – GRP production director, art direction
- Lillian Barbuti – production direction assistant
- Andy Baltimore – GRP creative director
- Alba Acevedo – graphic design
- Jeff Sedlick – photography
- The Fitzgerald/Hartley, Co. – management

== Charts ==
| Chart (1994) | Peak position |
|---|---|
| Billboard Jazz Albums | 14 |
