= Professional Dreamer =

Studio album by David Benoit
- Released: June 1, 1999
- Recorded: 1999
- Studio: 29th Street Studio (Torrance, California)
- Genre: Jazz
- Length: 46:38
- Label: GRP
- Producer: Rick Braun; David Benoit; Clark Germain

David Benoit chronology
American Landscape (1997)	Professional Dreamer (1999)	Here's to You, Charlie Brown: 50 Great Years! (2000)

Professional Dreamer is an album by American pianist David Benoit released in 1999, and recorded for the GRP label. The album reached #8 on Billboard's Jazz chart.
The song "Dad's Room" (track #10) was a Grammy nominee for Best Instrumental Composition.

== Track listing ==
All tracks composed by David Benoit and Rick Braun; except where indicated

1. "Why Not" - 4:54
2. "Miles After Dark" - 5:31
3. "Something You Said" (David Benoit) - 4:57
4. "ReJoyce" - 4:44
5. "Golden Gate" (David Benoit) - 4:52
6. "Gothic Jazz Dance" (David Benoit) - 4:12
7. "Jump Start" - 4:46
8. "Thinking 'Bout the Cove" (David Benoit) - 4:18
9. "Twilight March" - 4:43
10. "Dad's Room" (David Benoit) - 3:41

== Personnel ==
- David Benoit – acoustic piano, computer programming, Hammond B3 organ (1, 7), strings (3, 9), keyboards (5, 6, 8), Fender Rhodes (5, 6, 8, 9), sequenced percussion (5, 6, 8), arrangements and conductor (10)
- Rick Braun – programming (1–4, 7), flugelhorn (2)
- Ross Bolton – guitar (1)
- Pat Kelley – guitar (2, 4, 9)
- Marc Antoine – guitar (3)
- Tony Maiden – guitar (4, 7)
- Cliff Hugo – bass (2, 4)
- Jimmy Johnson – bass (3, 9)
- Neil Stubenhaus – bass (5, 6, 8)
- David Palmer – drums (1, 4, 9)
- Vinnie Colaiuta – drums (5, 6, 8)
- John Ferraro – cymbals (3), percussion (3), drums (7)
- Spectrasonics Liquid Grooves – loops (3)
- Brad Dutz – percussion (5, 6, 8)
- Andy Suzuki – tenor saxophone (7)

Strings on "Dad's Room"

- Suzie Katayama – music contractor
- Bruce Dukov – concertmaster
- Arni Eglisson, Dave Stone and Ken Wild – bass
- Larry Corbett and Steve Richards – cello
- Jimbo Ross, John Scanlon and Evan Wilson – viola
- Jackie Brand, Joel Derouin, Bruce Dukov, Endre Granat, Clayton Haslop, Karen Jones, Peter Kent, Ezra Kliger, Barbara Porter, Anatoly Rosinsky, Miwako Wantanabe and John Wittenberg – violin

== Production ==
- Rick Braun – producer (1–4, 7, 9)
- David Benoit – producer (5, 6, 8, 10)
- Clark Germain – producer (5, 6, 8, 10), mixing (5, 6, 8, 10), recording engineer
- Steve Sykes – mixing (1–4, 7, 9)
- Ken Gruberman – music preparation, computer consultant
- Daniel Sofer – computer consultant
- John Newcott – release coordination
- Yvonne Wish – production coordinator
- David Riegel – graphic design
- Hollis King – art direction
- Kamil Vojnar – illustration
- Tracy Lamonica – photography
- Tracks 1–4, 7 & 9 mixed at "Lefty's"
- Tracks 5, 6, 8 & 10 mixed at The Village Recorder (Los Angeles, California)

== Charts ==
Chart (1999)	Peak position
Billboard Jazz Albums	8
