= Jazz for Peanuts =

Compilation album by David Benoit
- Released: October 28, 2008
- Recorded: 1989–2008
- Genres: Jazz; Soundtrack
- Length: 40:30
- Labels: Peak; Concord
- Producer: David Benoit

Professional ratings
Review scores
Source	Rating
AllMusic	3.5/5 stars
All About Jazz	5/5 stars
JazzTimes	5/5 stars

Jazz for Peanuts: A Retrospective of the Charlie Brown TV Themes is a compilation album released in the U.S. by Peak Records in October 2008. The album is credited to David Benoit and contains a mix of previously released material plus newly recorded songs featured in prime-time animated television specials based on the Peanuts comic strip by Charles M. Schulz.

== Critical reception ==
AllMusic critic Thom Jurek called the album an "odd duck", saying it is "all the better for it". Jurek noted that Benoit "succeeded the late Vince Guaraldi as the musical director for the Peanuts television specials, meaning that his 50th anniversary recording of Guaraldi's music wasn't a simple tribute, but a nod to his predecessor". Jurek also noted that both Benoit's compositions, as well as Guaraldi's classic melodies, "were newly recorded live in the studio, lending them their timeless lyric quality and immediacy of presence". All About Jazz critic Woodrow Wilkins noted how the "symbiotic relationship between pianist David Benoit and Peanuts" is a "blessing for fans of both the animated series and jazz".

== Track listing ==
All songs composed by Vince Guaraldi except where noted.

No.	Title	Writer	Performer	Original release	Length
1	"You're in Love, Charlie Brown"		David Benoit Quintet; Christian Scott		4:07
2	"The Buggy Ride"	Wynton Marsalis	Wynton Marsalis Septet	Joe Cool's Blues (1995); featured in This Is America, Charlie Brown: The Wright Brothers at Kitty Hawk	4:35
3	"Benjamin"	Dave Brubeck	Dave Brubeck Quartet	Happy Anniversary, Charlie Brown (1989); featured in This Is America, Charlie Brown: The NASA Space Station	3:48
4	"The Great Pumpkin Waltz"		David Benoit Trio	interpolated with "Graveyard Theme (Trick or Treat)"	4:18
5	"Wild Kids"	David Benoit	David Benoit Quartet; Taylor Eigsti	Urban Daydreams (1989); featured in This Is America, Charlie Brown: The Great Inventors	4:18
6	"Breadline Blues"	Dave Grusin	Kenny G	Happy Anniversary, Charlie Brown (1989); featured in This Is America, Charlie Brown: The Smithsonian and the Presidency	4:10
7	"Be My Valentine" (aka "Heartburn Waltz")		David Benoit Trio	featured in A Charlie Brown Valentine (2002)	4:36
8	"Rollerblading"	David Benoit	David Benoit Quintet; Christian Scott	featured in It Was My Best Birthday Ever, Charlie Brown (1997)	3:53
9	"Re-Run's Theme"	David Benoit	David Benoit Quintet	featured in I Want a Dog for Christmas, Charlie Brown (2003)	3:47
10	"Linus and Lucy"		David Benoit Trio; Vince Guaraldi Trio (archived recording)	Here's to You, Charlie Brown: 50 Great Years! (2000)	3:06

== Personnel ==
Credits adapted from CD liner notes.

- David Benoit – piano (Tracks 1, 4, 5, 7–10)
- Dave Carpenter – bass (Tracks 1, 4, 5, 7–10)
- John Robinson – drums (Tracks 1, 4–10)
- Christian Scott – trumpet (Tracks 1, 8)
- Andy Suzuki – tenor saxophone (Tracks 1, 8); flute (Track 9)
- Pat Kelley – guitar (Tracks 1, 5, 8, 9)
- Wynton Marsalis – trumpet (Track 2)
- Eric Reed – piano (Track 2)
- Benjamin Wolfe – double bass (Track 2)
- Wessell Anderson – alto and soprano saxophones (Track 2)
- Victor Goines – tenor saxophone and clarinet (Track 2)
- Wycliffe Gordon – trombone (Track 2)
- Herlin Riley – drums (Track 2)
- Dave Brubeck – piano (Track 3)
- Bobby Militello – flute (Track 3)
- Chris Brubeck – electric bass (Track 3)
- Randy Jones – drums (Track 3)
- Taylor Eigsti – piano (Track 5)
- Kenny G – soprano saxophone (Track 6)
- Walter Afanasieff – keyboards (Track 6)
- Vail Johnson – electric bass (Track 6)
- Vince Guaraldi – piano (Track 10)
- Monty Budwig – bass (Track 10)
- Colin Bailey – drums (Track 10)
