= Am I Cool or What? =

Studio album by various artists
- Released: July 3, 1991
- Genres: R&B, jazz
- Length: 39:51
- Label: GRP Records
- Producers: Marcel East, André Fischer

Professional ratings
Review scores
Source	Rating
Allmusic	4.5/5 stars

Am I Cool or What? is an album featuring songs inspired by the American comic strip Garfield created by Jim Davis. It was released on July 3, 1991, by GRP Records in cassette tape and compact disc format. The genre is primarily R&B and contemporary jazz. The album features appearances by influential contributors to the genre, including B. B. King and The Temptations. It peaked at number 23 on the Billboard charts for top contemporary jazz albums.

Three of the songs ("Long 'Bout Midnight", "Here Comes Garfield" and "Up on a Fence") were originally recorded for the soundtrack to Here Comes Garfield, with the former two appearing in the special itself. Two other songs ("Shake Your Paw", "Monday Morning Blues (Blues for Mr. G)") appeared in Garfield Gets a Life, which also used the melody of "Spare Time" for its opening theme.

== Critical reception ==
Rob Theakston of Allmusic rated it 4.5 stars out of 5, saying that "this is a perfect way to not only introduce children to many of these musical styles but to do so in an extremely fun atmosphere."

== Track listing ==
No.	Title	Writer(s)	Performer	Length
1.	"Shake Your Paw"	Tim Camp	The Temptations	3:41
2.	"I Love It When I'm Naughty"	Catte Adams, Will Ryan, Marc Hugenberger	Patti LaBelle	4:29
3.	"Fat Is Where It's At"	Camp	Carl Anderson	3:38
4.	"Long 'Bout Midnight"	Desirée Goyette, Ed Bogas	Natalie Cole	4:19
5.	"Nine Lives"	Adams, Ryan	The Pointer Sisters	4:17
6.	"Here Comes Garfield"	Goyette, Bogas	Lou Rawls	3:06
7.	"Next to You I'm Even Better"	Adams, Ryan	Diane Schuur	3:55
8.	"Spare Time"	David Benoit, Marcel East	David Benoit	4:53
9.	"Up on a Fence"	Goyette, Bogas	Desirée Goyette	3:16
10.	"Monday Morning Blues (Blues for Mr. G)"	Patrick DeVuono, Darlene Koldenhoven	B.B. King	4:17

== Credits ==
- Anas Allaf – engineer, assistant engineer
- Ken Allardyce – engineer
- Carl Anderson – vocals, performer
- Andy Baltimore – creative director
- David Benoit – synthesizer, bass, piano, strings, arrangements, vocals, clavier, brass, performer, string director
- Brad Cole – synthesizer, arrangements, keyboards, programming, associate producer, keyboard arrangements
- Natalie Cole – vocals
- Cal David – guitar
- Jim Davis – liner notes
- Denise DeCaro – backing vocalist
- Frank DeCaro – coordination, management
- Digital Allstars – keyboards, programming
- Joseph Doughney – digital editing, post-production, digital editing assistant
- Marcel East – arrangements, drums, bass, producer (track 8), engineer, drum programming, bass synthesizer, percussion programming
- Nathan East – bass guitar
- André Fischer – arrangements, producer (except track eight)
- Carol Freeman – photography
- David Gibb – graphic design
- Khaliq Glover – engineer
- Josiah Gluck – engineer
- Desirée Goyette – vocals
- Carl Griffin – assistant executive producer, executive associate
- Dave Grusin – executive producer
- Guido Harari – photography
- Tshlene Henreid – production assistant, assistant producer
- Steve Holroyd – engineer
- Jean Marie Horvath – engineer, assistant engineer
- Marc Hugenberger – arrangements, keyboards, programming, associate producer, keyboard arrangements
- Jim Hughart – electric upright bass
- Mike Humphrey – photography
- Clydene Jackson – backing vocalist
- Paul Jasmin – photography
- Alison Jefferson – assistant production coordination
- Ted Jensen – mastering
- Scott Johnson – graphic design
- B. B. King – guitar, vocals, overdubs
- Patti LaBelle – vocals
- Michael Landy – digital editing, post-production
- Michelle Lewis – production coordination
- Randy Long – programming, engineer, assistant engineer
- Sal Marquez – trumpet
- Richard McKernan – engineer
- Sonny Mediana – graphic design
- Lorenzo Music – vocals, voice of Garfield
- N Sisters – backing vocalist
- Valerie Pinkston – vocals
- The Pointer Sisters – vocals
- Lou Rawls – vocals
- Bill Reichenbach Jr. – trombone
- Matthew Rolston – photography
- Larry Rosen – executive producer
- Andy Ruggirello – graphic design
- Bonnie Schiffman – photography
- Diane Schuur – vocals
- Tom Scott – saxophone
- Dan Serrano – graphic design
- Allen Sides – engineer, mixing
- Larry Steelman – arranger, keyboards, programming, associate producer, keyboard arrangements
- The Temptations – vocals
- Carmen Twillie – backing vocalist
- Carlos Vega – drums
- Larry Washington – cymbals
- Carol Weinberg – photography
- Jeffrey "Woody" Woodruff – recorder, engineer, mixing
