= Great Pumpkin Waltz =

1966 jazz composition by Vince Guaraldi

"The Great Pumpkin Waltz"

Composition by Vince Guaraldi

from the album It's the Great Pumpkin, Charlie Brown: Original Soundtrack Recording
- Recorded: October 4, 1966
- Studio: Gower Street Studio, Desilu Productions, Hollywood, California
- Genre: Jazz waltz
- Composer: Vince Guaraldi
- Producers: Jason Mendelson; Sean Mendelson

Music video
- "Great Pumpkin Waltz" on YouTube

"The Great Pumpkin Waltz" is an instrumental jazz waltz composed by American pianist Vince Guaraldi for the 1966 Peanuts television special It's the Great Pumpkin, Charlie Brown. Written in 3/4 time, the composition serves as a recurring theme for Linus's belief in the Great Pumpkin. Guaraldi recorded it with a sextet and later reinterpreted it for his 1968 album Oh Good Grief!.

== Composition and musical structure ==
Musicologist Ryan Raul Bañagale describes "The Great Pumpkin Waltz" as an AABA-form jazz waltz, with 12-bar A sections in C minor. Its principal melody centers on the notes G–F–E♭–F, accompanied by a descending chromatic bass line that leads into a ii–V–I progression. The contrasting B section moves to the dominant major. New age pianist George Winston identified C minor and E♭ major as the composition's principal key areas and notes its characteristic descending chord progression, which Guaraldi also used in "Christmas Time Is Here" and "Monterey".

In a 2020 doctoral dissertation, Alec Villars Huntley analyzed the 1968 recording, identifying a chromatic bass passage he termed a "tritone walkdown" beginning in the fifth measure. His analysis notes Guaraldi's use of inverted major and diminished chords to maintain the descending bass movement.

== Recording and use in the special ==
Guaraldi recorded the original score on October 4, 1966, at Desilu's Gower Street Studio in Hollywood. The sextet comprised Guaraldi on piano, Monty Budwig on double bass, Colin Bailey on drums, John Gray on guitar, Mannie Klein on trumpet and Ronnie Lang on woodwinds. John Scott Trotter supervised the recording session. “The Great Pumpkin Waltz” accompanies Linus writing to the Great Pumpkin and recurs during Halloween preparations and a later pumpkin patch scene.

== Subsequent recordings and releases ==
Guaraldi rerecorded the composition for Oh Good Grief! (1968), performing with guitarist Eddie Duran, bassist Stanley Gilbert and drummer Carl Burnett. Recorded on March 22, 1968, at Golden State Recorders in San Francisco, the arrangement features acoustic piano rather than the electric harpsichord used elsewhere on the album.

A brief, synthesized version was utilized in the 1975 special You're a Good Sport, Charlie Brown, marking the only subsequent usage of the song within a Peanuts television special nearly a decade later.

The original recording sourced from the television soundtrack first appeared on Charlie Brown's Holiday Hits (1998). A complete soundtrack album followed in 2018, assembled from the television audio. An expanded 2022 edition used rediscovered session recordings and included an alternate take of the waltz.

Other interpretations include recordings by Chick Corea for Happy Anniversary, Charlie Brown!, George Winston for Linus and Lucy: The Music of Vince Guaraldi (1996), and David Benoit for Jazz for Peanuts (2008).

== Critical reception ==
Reviewing the 2022 soundtrack for All About Jazz, Mark Sullivan described "The Great Pumpkin Waltz" as a "charming exception" to the score's shorter cues, highlighting guitarist John Gray's extended contribution. Reviewing the 1968 recording for the same publication, Doug Collette praised the quartet's interplay and the warmth of its performance. A retrospective review in The Second Disc cited the waltz as a showcase for the quartet's "jazz prowess".

== Sources ==
- Bang, Derrick (2012). Vince Guaraldi at the Piano (1st ed.). McFarland. ISBN 978-1-4766-5223-8.
