= Great Pumpkin =

Peanuts comic strip character

A thematical representation of the Great Pumpkin from the title panel of the October 30, 1977 strip, by Charles M. Schulz.

The Great Pumpkin is an unseen character in the comic strip Peanuts by Charles M. Schulz. According to Linus van Pelt, the Great Pumpkin is a legendary personality who rises from the pumpkin patch on Halloween carrying a large bag of toys to deliver to believing children. Linus continues to maintain faith in the Great Pumpkin, despite his friends' mockery and disbelief.

The Great Pumpkin was first introduced in the strip dated October 26, 1959, and Schulz subsequently reworked the premise many times throughout the run of Peanuts. It notably inspired the 1966 animated television special It's the Great Pumpkin, Charlie Brown and Vince Guaraldi's recurring musical theme "The Great Pumpkin Waltz". The strips of October 30, 1977, and October 26, 1986, both include a thematical illustration of the Great Pumpkin in the title panel, which is not part of the story of the strip.

While Schulz usually avoided outright politics, he enjoyed his Great Pumpkin strips and incorporating religious references in many comics and animated cartoons.

== Premise ==
Linus awaits the Great Pumpkin with a sign welcoming it.

Each year Linus awaits the arrival of the Great Pumpkin in a pumpkin patch deemed most sincere and lacking in hypocrisy. The following morning, each year, an embarrassed yet undefeated Linus vows to wait for the Great Pumpkin again the following Halloween. Linus acknowledges the similarities between the Great Pumpkin and Santa Claus (in the television special, Linus writes to the Great Pumpkin that Santa Claus has better publicity). Charlie Brown attributes Linus's belief in the Great Pumpkin to "denominational differences."

In the comic strip dated October 25, 1961, Linus explains: "There are three things I have learned never to discuss with people: religion, politics, and the Great Pumpkin." This quote would later be said by Linus in the TV special. A few days later, Linus claims previously-reported official sightings of the Great Pumpkin in Connecticut and Texas, and Charlie Brown hears of a sighting in New Jersey.

Linus remains faithful to the Great Pumpkin, even devising a Great Pumpkin Newsletter in comic strips dated October 1998.

== Religious metaphors ==
The Great Pumpkin has been cited as a symbol of strong faith and foolish faith, leading to vastly different interpretations of creator Charles Schulz's own faith. As described in the book on Schulz's religious views, A Charlie Brown Religion, Schulz's views were very personal and often misinterpreted. Linus's seemingly unshakable belief in the Great Pumpkin, and his desire to foster the same belief in others, has been interpreted as a parody of Christian evangelism by some observers. Others have seen Linus's belief in the Great Pumpkin as symbolic of the struggles faced by anyone with beliefs or practices that are not shared by the majority. Still others view Linus's lonely vigils, in the service of a being that may or may not exist and which never makes its presence known in any case, as a metaphor for mankind's basic existential dilemmas.

Schulz himself, however, claimed no motivation beyond the humor of having one of his young characters confuse Halloween with Christmas. In the 1959 sequence of strips in which the Great Pumpkin is first mentioned, for instance, Schulz also has Linus suggest that he and the other kids "go out and sing pumpkin carols", something which he also asks of the trick-or-treating kids in the special itself.

== In animated adaptations ==
After the Great Pumpkin formed the central premise of the 1966 television special It's the Great Pumpkin, Charlie Brown, later television specials would also reference the character. These included You're Not Elected, Charlie Brown (1972) when Linus almost blows his chances in a school election; It's the Easter Beagle, Charlie Brown (1974) in which Sally cites her previous experience with the non-appearance of the Great Pumpkin; and You're a Good Sport, Charlie Brown (1975), wherein Linus enters the pumpkin patch with Charlie Brown, who gets teased as being the Great Pumpkin. The Peanuts Movie (2015) also namedrops the character, when Linus says he hopes the new kid in town (later revealed as the Little Red-Haired Girl) might be willing to believe in the Great Pumpkin.

== Music ==
The Great Pumpkin also inspired "The Great Pumpkin Waltz", an instrumental jazz waltz composed by Vince Guaraldi for It's the Great Pumpkin, Charlie Brown. Recorded with a sextet in October 1966, the composition recurs throughout the special as a musical theme for Linus and his belief in the Great Pumpkin, rather than as conventional suspense or horror music.

Guaraldi rerecorded the piece for his 1968 album Oh Good Grief!, and later versions were recorded by jazz pianists Chick Corea, George Winston and David Benoit. Although no soundtrack album accompanied the original broadcast, the music was subsequently released on Charlie Brown's Holiday Hits (1998) and It's the Great Pumpkin, Charlie Brown: Original Soundtrack Recording. The discovery of the original session reels led to an expanded 2022 edition containing the complete master of "The Great Pumpkin Waltz" and an alternate take.

== In popular culture ==
- The song "Snoopy vs. the Red Baron", has the lyrics "Now, Snoopy had swore [sic] that he'd get that man so he asked the Great Pumpkin for a new battle plan".
- In October 2010, forty-four years after the initial airing of It's the Great Pumpkin, Charlie Brown, the Great Pumpkin was the topic of a licensed use by the online game Poptropica. The site's 15th island is Great Pumpkin Island, and features several of the Peanuts characters interacting with players. As the island follows the same plot as the original TV special, the Great Pumpkin does not appear, and turns out to be Snoopy with a pumpkin on his head.

== See also ==
- Stingy Jack
- Jack Skellington
- "It's the Grand Pumpkin, Milhouse" ("Treehouse of Horror XIX")
- David S. Pumpkins
