= Inner Motion =

Studio album by David Benoit
- Released: August 17, 1990
- Recorded: April & May, 1990
- Studios: Ocean Way Recording (Hollywood, California); Bill Schnee Studios (North Hollywood, California); Pyramid Studios (Los Angeles, California); Pack's Place (Sunland, California)
- Genre: Jazz
- Length: 44:18
- Label: GRP
- Producers: David Benoit; Allen Sides

David Benoit chronology
Waiting for Spring (1989)	Inner Motion (1990)	Shadows (1991)

Inner Motion is an album by American pianist David Benoit released in 1990, recorded for the GRP label. The album reached #3 on Billboard's Jazz chart category.

== Track listing ==
All tracks composed by David Benoit; except where indicated

1. "M.W.A. (Musicians With Attitude)" (David Benoit, Marcel East, Nathan East) - 4:38
2. "Coconut Roads" - 3:45
3. "Every Corner of The World" (David Benoit, David Pack) - 5:24
4. "6-String Poet" - 5:14
5. "Houston" - 4:54
6. "Along Love's Highway" - 3:44
7. "Deep Light" - 4:21
8. "El Camino Real" (Eddie Arkin, David Benoit) - 4:42
9. "South East Quarter" - 4:56
10. "A Last Request" - 2:40

== Personnel ==
- David Benoit – Steinway grand piano (1, 2, 5, 8), synth brass (1), synth strings (1), Fender Rhodes (2, 8), Yamaha MIDI piano (3, 4, 6, 7, 9, 10), Hammond B3 organ (6), synthesizers (9)
- Marcel East – synthesizer programming (1), drum machine (1)
- Pat Kelley – acoustic guitar (2, 8), electric guitar (2, 8)
- Paul Jackson, Jr. – guitars (3, 6)
- Grant Geissman – acoustic guitar (4, 5, 7, 10), 12-string guitar (5), Spanish guitar (5), banjo (5), mandolin (5), electric guitar (9)
- Neil Stubenhaus – bass guitar (2, 3, 6, 8)
- Steve Bailey – acoustic bass guitar (4), acoustic bass (5), fretless bass (5), vertical bass (7), 6-string fretless bass (9, 10)
- Vinnie Colaiuta – drums (1)
- John Robinson – drums (2, 3, 6, 8)
- David Derge – drums (4, 5, 7, 9, 10)
- Michael Fisher – percussion (2, 4, 5, 8, 10)
- Steve Forman – percussion (3, 6, 7, 9)
- Brandon Fields – alto saxophone (2, 8)
- Eric Marienthal – soprano saxophone (7, 10)
- Gary Herbig – clarinet (2, 8)
- Doug Cameron – violin solo (5)
- David Pack – lead vocals (3, 6), vocal arrangements (3, 6)
- Melinda Chatman – backing vocals (3, 6)
- Phillip Ingram – backing vocals (3, 6)
- Jean McClain – backing vocals (3, 6)
- Chuck Sabatino – backing vocals (3, 6)

The Warfield Avenue Symphony Orchestra (Tracks 4, 5 & 10)

- David Benoit – arrangements and conductor
- Suzie Katayama – manager, copyist

Horns

- Renee Grizzell and Ronald Landringer – piccolo flute
- Steven Holtman and Alex IIes – trombone
- Bob Findley, Walter Johnson and Robert O'Donnel Jr. – trumpet

Strings

- Bruce Dukov – concertmaster
- Jim Lacefield and Paul Zibits – bass
- Ernie Ehrhardt, Maurice Grants, Suzie Katayama and Harry Shlutz – cello
- Amy Shulman – harp
- Renita Koven and Jimbo Ross – viola
- Doug Cameron, Joel Deuroin, Marci Dicterow, Joseph Goodman, Peter Kent, Gina Kronstadt-Fields, Dimitrie Leivici, Sid Page, Charles Veal Jr., Shari Zippert and Michelle Zival-Fox – violin

Percussion

- Michael Fisher and Scott Higgins – mallets

== Production ==
- Dave Grusin – executive producer
- Larry Rosen – executive producer
- David Benoit – producer
- Allen Sides – producer, recording, mixing
- Joseph Doughney – post-production
- Michael Landey – post-production
- The Review Room (New York City, New York) – post-production location
- Bernie Grundman – mastering at Bernie Grundman Mastering (Hollywood, California)
- Jeff Fair – technical coordinator
- Shari Sutcliffe – production coordinator
- Suzanne Sherman – GRP production coordinator
- William Anderson – project coordinator
- Andy Baltimore – GRP creative director
- David Gibb – graphic design
- Jacki McCarthy – graphic design
- Andy Ruggirello – graphic design
- Dan Serrano – graphic design
- Michael Going – photography
- Steve Anderson – photography assistant
- Jana Angeles – photography assistant
- Felicia Martinez – photography assistant
- Rea Ann Silva – hair, make-up
- Fitzgerald / Hartley Co. – management

== Charts ==
Chart (1990)	Peak position
Billboard Jazz Albums	3
