= Khaliq Glover =

Khaliq Glover popularly known as Khaliq-O-Vision, is a Grammy award winning recording mix engineer, producer and the author of Secrets: How The Stars Make Music IRRESISTIBLE!. Khaliq is the recipient of the 2001 Grammy Award for M² (album) by Marcus Miller under the Best Contemporary Jazz Album. He pursued his education in music at Dick Grove School Of Music.

== Career ==
Glover started his career in 1982 when he began working as a recording and mixing engineer. Khaliq worked for Lion Share Studios under Kenny Rogers for four years and in 1987, he joined Wings West Studios, where Khaliq worked under Jeffrey Osborne. He also worked with Dave Hampton - MATK Corporation as an Engineering Consultant and founded Khaliq-O-Vision Music the same year.

In 2002, Glover joined Hancock Music, where he worked for Herbie Hancock at his home studio as a mixing engineer for two years. From 2004 to 2007, he worked for Prince at Paisley Park Studios as a recording and mixing engineer.

In 2007, Glover started providing independent pro audio and pro video services in the entertainment industry. In 2013, Khaliq founded the Music Mixing Success Bootcamp, a two-day live mixing event for singers, songwriters, musicians, producers, and engineers, held at the Sheraton-Gateway LAX Hotel.

Throughout his career, Glover worked with multiple artists such as Michael Jackson, Lionel Richie, Stevie Wonder, Ray Charles, Bruce Springsteen, Bob Dylan, Diana Ross, John Mayer, Christina Aguilera, Justin Timberlake, Brian Eno, Smokey Robinson, Jeffrey Osborne, B2K, Narada Michael Walden, Kenny Lattimore, Thelonious Monk Institute of Jazz and others.

== Discography ==
Year	Album	Artist	All Credits
2020	Borders EP	Stav McAllister	Producer, Mixing
2014	Donna: The CD Collection	Donna Summer	Vocals (Background)
2012	Kings of the Evening [Original Motion Picture Soundtrack]	Kevin Toney	Mixing
2012	Heart of Gratitude	Kevin Toney	Engineer
2010	Michael	Michael Jackson	Engineer, Mixing
2010	Monster	Michael Jackson	Recording Engineer
2009	Rock Steady	Richard Elliot	Audio Engineer, Drum Engineering
2009	All It Takes	Rick Braun	Engineer
2008	Surrender/Choose Life	Debby Boone	Vocals (Background)
2008	Every Turn of the World/Back of My Mind	Christopher Cross	Vocals (Background)
2007	The Art of Love & War	Angie Stone	Mixing
2007	RnR	Rick Braun / Richard Elliot	Engineer
2006	Necessary Rukkus	Necessary Rukkus	Mixing
2006	HeadBoppin	Shilts	Engineer
2006	FutureSex/LoveSounds	Justin Timberlake	String Engineer
2005	Possibilities	Herbie Hancock	Engineer, Mixing
2005	Gold	Donna Summer	Vocals (Background)
2004	Portrait of Bill Evans		Producer, Engineer, Remixing, Drum Programming, Sampling
2004	Food for the Spirit	Smokey Robinson	Engineer, Mixing
2003	Music Is Life	Jeffrey Osborne	Engineer, Mixing, Synthesizer Programming
2002	The Very Best of Christopher Cross	Christopher Cross	Vocals (Background)
2002	Beautiful World	Take 6	Percussion, Drum Programming
2001	Strut	Kevin Toney	Engineer, Vocal Engineer
2001	Gigi	Gigi	Engineer
2000	The Writes of Passage	Sheila E. & the E-Train / Sheila E.	Engineer, Assistant Engineer
2000	That's for Sure	Jeffrey Osborne	Producer, Guitar, Keyboards, Keyboard Programming, Drum Programming, Vocal Arrangement, Guitar Programming, Composer
1999	Street Sax	Chazzy Green	Mixing
1999	Midnight Passion	Michael Paulo	Engineer, Mixing
1998	Love Songs	Jennifer Love Hewitt	Engineer
1997	You're the Inspiration: A Collection	Peter Cetera	Engineer, Assistant Engineer, Second Engineer
1995	The Best of David Benoit 1987-1995	David Benoit	Engineer
1993	The Meteor Man		Engineer, Mixing
1993	Everything-N-More	Vesta / Vesta Williams	Engineer
1992	Choose Life	Debby Boone	Vocals (Background)
1991	So Intense	Lisa Fischer	Mixing, Assistant Engineer, Assistant
1991	Shadows	David Benoit	Engineer
1991	Phenomenon	The Rance Allen Group	Producer, Remixing, Synthesizer, Drums
1991	Keisha	Keisha Jackson	Engineer
1991	Fourplay	Fourplay	Engineer
1991	Burnin'	Patti LaBelle	Engineer
1991	Am I Cool or What?	Garfield	Engineer
1990	Tradewinds	Perri	Engineer
1990	Sally Moore	Sally Moore	Engineer
1990	3 for 3	3 for 3	Engineer
1989	Home	Stephanie Mills	Engineer
1988	One Love - One Dream	Jeffrey Osborne	Engineer
1986	Solitude/Solitaire	Peter Cetera	Engineer
1986	Emotional	Jeffrey Osborne	Engineer
1985	Wanna Play Your Game	Joyce Kennedy	Engineer
1985	USA for Africa: We Are the World	USA for Africa	Mixing, Clapping, Mixing Assistant
1985	Manilow	Barry Manilow	Assistant Engineer
1984	Cats Without Claws	Donna Summer	Vocals (Background)
	Inside Out	Bernard Fowler	Engineer
