= Shadows (David Benoit album) =

Studio album by David Benoit
- Released: October 1, 1991
- Recorded: 1991
- Studio: Studio Ultimo and Pyramid Studios (Los Angeles, California); Ocean Way Recording and Group IV Recording Studios (Hollywood, California)
- Genre: Jazz
- Length: 43:25
- Label: GRP
- Producer: Marcel East; David Benoit

David Benoit chronology
Inner Motion (1990)	Shadows (1991)	Letter to Evan (1992)

Shadows is an album by American pianist David Benoit released in 1991, recorded for the GRP label. The album reached #2 on Billboard's Contemporary Jazz chart.

== Track listing ==
All tracks composed by David Benoit and Marcel East; except where indicated

1. "Overture" - 1:31
2. "Over the Edge" - 5:37
3. "Have You Forgotten (Interlude)" (David Benoit) - 1:08
4. "Shadows" - 7:07
5. "Saudade" (David Benoit) - 3:48
6. "Moments" (David Benoit, Marcel East, Valerie Pinkston) - 4:49
7. "Already There" (David Benoit) - 3:45
8. "Still Standing" (David Benoit, Marcel East, Nathan East) - 5:11
9. "Castles" - 4:24
10. "Have You Forgotten" (David Benoit) - 4:24
11. "Reprise" - 1:39

== Personnel ==
Musicians and Vocalists

- David Benoit – synthesizers (1, 2, 4–7, 9), Yamaha MIDI grand piano (2, 4–10), guitars (3), electric piano (6), acoustic piano (11)
- Marcel East – synthesizers (2, 4, 6, 8), drum and percussion programming (2, 6, 8), percussion (3), guitars (6)
- Pat Kelly – guitars (7, 9)
- Neil Stubenhaus – bass (2)
- Nathan East – bass (4, 9)
- Jimmy Johnson – bass (7), fretless bass (10)
- John Robinson – drums (2, 6, 8)
- Jeff Porcaro – drums (4, 5, 7, 9, 10)
- Michael Fisher – percussion (1, 3, 8–10)
- Chris Trujillo – percussion (4, 5, 7, 10)
- Tommy Aros – percussion (5, 7)
- Michael Paulo – saxophones (2, 8), soprano sax solo (4)
- Ray Brown – trumpet (2)
- Michael "Patches" Stewart – trumpet (2), flugelhorn (2), trumpet solo (4)
- Freddie Hubbard – flugelhorn solo (5), trumpet solo (8)
- Valerie Pinkston – vocals (2), lead and backing vocals (6)
- Dori Caymmi – voice (3, 5), guitars (5), vocals (10)

Arrangements

- David Benoit – arrangements (1), horn and rhythm arrangements (2, 8)
- Marcel East – arrangements (1), horn arrangements (2, 8), rhythm arrangements (2, 4, 8), vocal arrangements (6)
- Valerie Pinkston – vocal arrangements (6)

The Shadows Symphony Orchestra

- David Benoit – orchestration and conductor (1), string arrangements and conductor (3, 4, 7, 8, 10)
- Marcel East – string arrangements (8)
- Suzie Katayama – contractor, music preparation
- Ken Gruberman – music preparation
- Bruce Dukov – concertmaster
- Sally Bonebreak – French horn (1)
- Chuck Domanico – bass (1)
- Larry Corbett and Suzie Katayama – cello (1, 3, 4, 7, 8, 10)
- Amy Shulman – harp (1, 3, 4, 7, 8, 10)
- Roland Kato and Ray Tischer – viola (1, 3, 4, 7, 8, 10)
- Joel Derouin, Bruce Dukov, Henry Ferber, Patricia Ann Johnson, Peter Kent, Sid Page, Michele Richards and Jay Rosen – violin (1, 3, 4, 7, 8, 10)

== Production ==
- Dave Grusin – executive producer
- Larry Rosen – executive producer
- Marcel East – producer, additional engineer
- David Benoit – co-producer
- Clark Germain – recording, string recording, mixing
- Khaliq Glover – recording
- Rik Pekkonen – recording
- John Paterno – additional engineer
- Rick Winquest – string recording assistant
- Dan Bosworth – mix assistant
- Noel Hazen – mix assistant
- Bernie Grundman – mastering at Bernie Grundman Mastering (Hollywood, California)
- Joseph Doughney – post-production
- Michael Landy – post-production
- The Review Room (New York City, New York) – post-production location
- Debbie Johnson – production coordinator
- Michelle Lewis – GRP production coordinator
- Andy Baltimore – GRP creative director
- David Gibb – graphic design
- Scott Johnson – graphic design
- Sonny Mediana – graphic design
- Andy Ruggirello – graphic design
- Dan Serrano – graphic design
- Carol Weinberg – photography
- Joy Alison – stylist
- Sylvia Sanguedolce – hair, make-up
- The Fitzgerald/Hartley Co. – management

== Charts ==
Chart (1991)	Peak position
Billboard Jazz Albums	2
