= Every Step of the Way =

Studio album by David Benoit
- Released: April 18, 1988
- Recorded: 1988
- Studio: Ocean Way Recording (Hollywood, California) Hallmark Studios (Westlake Village, California) Record Plant (New York City, New York)
- Genre: Jazz
- Length: 48:41
- Label: GRP
- Producer: Jeffrey Weber; David Benoit

David Benoit chronology
Freedom at Midnight (1987)	Every Step of the Way (1988)	Urban Daydreams (1989)

Every Step of the Way is an album by American pianist David Benoit released in 1988, recorded for the GRP label. The album reached No. 4 on the Billboard Contemporary Jazz chart and received a 1989 Grammy Nomination for Best Contemporary Jazz Performance.

== Track listing ==
All tracks composed by David Benoit; except where indicated

1. "Every Step of the Way" (David Benoit, Russ Freeman) – 4:04
2. "Shibuya Station" – 3:34
3. "The Key to You" (David Benoit, David Pack) – 5:04
4. "Remembering What You Said" – 4:34
5. "Once Running Free" – 2:46
6. "ReBach" (David Benoit, Nathan East) – 4:40
7. "Sao Paulo" – 5:17
8. "No Worries (David Benoit, Nathan East) – 5:34
9. "I Just Can't Stop Loving You" (Michael Jackson) – 4:52
10. "Painted Desert" – 4:25
11. "Saturdays" – 4:15

== Personnel ==
Musicians and Vocalists

- David Benoit – acoustic piano (1–5, 7, 9–11), keyboards (2, 3, 5, 7), keyboard programming (2, 6), Kawai MIDI electric grand piano (6, 8, 10), synth solo (6)
- Randy Waldman – keyboards (1–3, 6)
- Tom Ranier – keyboards (4, 7, 10, 11)
- Russ Freeman – lead guitar (1)
- Michael Landau – rhythm guitar (1), guitars (2, 3, 8), guitar solo (6)
- Grant Geissman – guitars (4, 7, 10)
- Neil Stubenhaus – bass (1, 2)
- Nathan East – bass (3, 6), bass solo (8), vocals (8)
- Bob Feldman – bass (4, 7, 10)
- Stanley Clarke – acoustic bass (9, 11)
- John Robinson – drums (1–3, 6, 8), drum programming (6)
- Tony Morales – drums (4, 7, 10)
- Harvey Mason – drums (9, 11)
- Michael Fisher – percussion (1, 2, 6, 8)
- Brad Dutz – percussion (4, 7, 9–11)
- Luis Conte – percussion (7)
- Chris Smith – harmonica (2)
- Eric Marienthal – alto saxophone (2)
- Sam Riney – saxophone (4, 10)
- Dave Valentin – flute (7)
- Bill Reichenbach, Jr. – trombone (3, 7)
- Gary Grant – trumpet (3, 7), flugelhorn (3, 7)
- Jerry Hey – trumpet (3, 7), flugelhorn (6, 7)
- The Warfield Avenue Symphony Orchestra – orchestra (6)
- Bruce Dukov – concertmaster (6)
- Suzie Katayama – orchestra contractor (6)
- David Pack – lead vocals (3)
- Phillip Ingram – backing vocals (3)
- Jeff Pescetto – backing vocals (3)
- Chuck Sabatino – backing vocals (3)

Arrangements

- David Benoit – arrangements (1), string arrangements and conductor (4), orchestra arrangements and conductor (6)
- Russ Freeman – arrangements (1)
- Jerry Hey – horn arrangements (3, 7)
- David Pack – vocal arrangements (3)

== Production ==
- Dave Grusin – executive producer
- Larry Rosen – executive producer
- David Benoit – producer
- Jeffrey Weber –producer
- Allen Sides – recording, mixing
- Bob Loftus – recording assistant, mix assistant
- Bruce Wildstein – recording assistant, mix assistant
- Josiah Gluck – additional recording
- Steve Hallmark – additional recording
- Bill Giolando – digital editing
- Bernie Grundman – mastering at Bernie Grundman Mastering (Hollywood, California)
- Ken Gruberman – music preparation
- Tim Olsen – music coordinator
- Suzanne Sherman – GRP production coordinator
- Andy Baltimore – GRP creative director
- Leslie Winther – album design
- Kamron Hinatsu – album cover photography
- Ted Cohen and Craig Sussman for Consenting Adults – artist management

== Charts ==
Chart (1988)	Peak position
Billboard Jazz Albums	4
