= The Benoit/Freeman Project =

Studio album by David Benoit and Russ Freeman
- Released: February 1, 1994
- Recorded: 1994
- Studio: Cheyenne Mountain Ranch Studios (Colorado); Ocean Way Recording (Hollywood, California); 29th Street Studio (Torrance, California); Santa Barbara Sound Design (Santa Barbara, California)
- Genre: Jazz
- Length: 51:57
- Label: GRP
- Producer: Russ Freeman; David Benoit

David Benoit chronology
Letter to Evan (1992)	The Benoit/Freeman Project (1994)	Shaken Not Stirred (1994)

The Benoit Freeman Project is an album by American pianist David Benoit and American guitarist Russ Freeman that was released in 1994 and recorded for the GRP label. The album reached No. 2 on the jazz chart at Billboard magazine. Freeman is the founder and leader of the Rippingtons.

== Track listing ==
All tracks composed by David Benoit and Russ Freeman; except where indicated

1. "Reunion" (Freeman) – 5:06
2. "When She Believed in Me" (Kenny Loggins, Benoit, Freeman) – 5:25
3. "Mediterranean Nights" – 6:57
4. "Swept Away" – 4:55
5. "The End of Our Season" – 4:16
6. "After the Love Has Gone" (David Foster, Jay Graydon, Bill Champlin) – 4:18
7. "Smartypants" – 5:42
8. "It's the Thought that Counts" (Benoit) – 6:02
9. "Mirage" (Freeman) – 5:59
10. "That's All I Could Say" – 3:17

== Personnel ==
- David Benoit – acoustic piano, rhythm arrangements, string arrangements and conductor (1, 3, 10), horn arrangements (7)
- Russ Freeman – synthesizers (1–5, 7), acoustic guitar (1, 2), electric guitar (1–5, 7, 9), classical guitar (1, 3–5, 8–10), rhythm arrangements, percussion (2, 6), bass (5), additional keyboards (6), guitars (6)
- Nathan East – bass (1–4, 7–9), vocals (8)
- Abraham Laboriel – bass (6)
- John Robinson – drums (1–4, 7–9), percussion (8)
- Tony Morales – drums (5)
- Mike Baird – drums (6)
- Steve Reid – percussion (1, 3, 10)
- Dan Higgins – alto saxophone (7)
- Gary Grant – trumpet (7)
- Jerry Hey – flugelhorn (6), trumpet solo (7), horn arrangements (7)
- Kenny Loggins – lead and backing vocals (2)
- Steve George – backing vocals (2)
- Anjani Thomas – backing vocals (2)
- Phil Perry – lead and backing vocals (6)
- Vesta Williams – lead vocals (6)

Orchestra (Tracks 1, 3 & 10)

- Suzie Katayama – music contractor, music preparation
- Joel Derouin – concertmaster
- Chuck Domanico and Arni Egilsson – bass
- Larry Corbett, Stephen Erdody, Suzie Katayama and Daniel Smith – cello
- Robert Becker, Cynthia Morrow, James Ross and Evan Wilson – viola
- Ron Clark, Bruce Dukov, Charles Everett, Armen Garabedian, Berj Garabedian, Pamela Gates, Endre Granat, Henry Ferber, Peter Kent, Maria Newman and Michele Richards – violin

== Production ==
- Dave Grusin – executive producer
- Larry Rosen – executive producer
- David Benoit – producer
- Russ Freeman – producer, vocal producer (2), overdub recording, guitar recording, additional keyboard recording, mixing
- Clark Germain – basic track recording, piano and drum recording (5), horn recording (7)
- Terry Nelson – engineer (2)
- Alan Hirshberg – engineer (6), basic track recording (6)
- Jeff Demorest – recording assistant
- Mark Guilbeault – recording assistant
- Tim Aller – piano and drum recording assistant (5), assistant engineer (6), horn recording assistant (7)
- Carl Griffin – mix assistant
- Ted Jensen – mastering at Sterling Sound (New York, NY)
- Joseph Doughney – post-production
- Michael Landry – post-production
- The Review Room (New York, NY) – post-production location
- Andi Howard – album coordinator
- Cara Bridges – album coordination assistant
- Michael Pollard – GRP production coordinator
- Sonny Mediana – GRP production director
- Sharon Franklin – production direction assistant
- Andy Baltimore – creative director
- Alba Acevedo – graphic design
- Dan Serrano – art direction, cover art
- Carl Studna – photography
- The Fitzgerald Hartley Co. – management for David Benoit
- Gardner Howard Ringe Entertainment – management for Russ Freeman

== Charts ==
Chart (1994)	Peak position
Billboard Jazz Albums	2
