= Here's to You, Charlie Brown: 50 Great Years! =

Here's to You Charlie Brown: 50 Great Years!

Studio album by David Benoit
- Released: April 25, 2000
- Recorded: September 1999 – February 2000
- Studio: Avatar Studios (New York City, New York); Schnee Studios (North Hollywood, California); Sound Kitchen (Franklin, Tennessee); Capitol Studios (Hollywood, California)
- Genre: Jazz
- Length: 41:52
- Label: GRP
- Producer: Tommy LiPuma

David Benoit chronology
Professional Dreamer (1999)	Here's to You Charlie Brown: 50 Great Years! (2000)	Fuzzy Logic (2002)

Professional ratings
Review scores
Source	Rating
AllMusic	3/5 stars

Here's to You Charlie Brown: 50 Great Years! is an album by American pianist David Benoit released in 2000, and recorded for the GRP label. The album reached No. 2 on Billboard's Jazz chart. The album is a memorial to Charles M. Schulz, creator of Peanuts, and jazz pianist Vince Guaraldi, who composed music scores for the first 16 television specials before his death in 1976. This album also received a nomination for "Best Engineered Album, Non-classical" at the 43rd Grammy Awards.

== Track listing ==
All tracks are written by Vince Guaraldi, except where noted.

No.	Title	Writer(s)	Length
1.	"Linus and Lucy"		3:06
2.	"Charlie Brown Theme"	Vince Guaraldi; Lee Mendelson	4:18
3.	"Pebble Beach"		4:38
4.	"Linus Tells Charlie"	David Benoit	4:30
5.	"Frieda (With the Naturally Curly Hair)"		4:34
6.	"Christmas Time Is Here"	Vince Guaraldi; Lee Mendelson	5:17
7.	"Getting Ready"	David Benoit	3:08
8.	"Blue Charlie Brown"		4:05
9.	"Red Baron"		4:28
10.	"Happiness"	Clark Gesner	3:47
Total length:			41:52

== Personnel ==
David Benoit Trio

- David Benoit – acoustic piano, arrangements, orchestra arrangements and conductor (10)
- Christian McBride – bass
- Peter Erskine – drums, percussion

Guest Musicians

- Vince Guaraldi – acoustic piano (1)
- Marc Antoine – guitar (3, 9)
- Russell Malone – guitar (8)
- Chris Botti – trumpet (4)
- Michael Brecker – tenor saxophone (5)
- Bruce Dukov – concertmaster (10)
- Ken Gruberman – music contractor (10)
- Take 6 – vocals (6)
- Al Jarreau – vocals (10)

== Production ==
- Tommy LiPuma – producer
- Clark Germain – recording, orchestra recording
- Bill Schnee – recording, mixing
- Marcelo Pennell – Take 6 vocal recording (6)
- Koji Egawa – assistant engineer
- Doug Sax – mastering at The Mastering Lab (Hollywood, California)
- Ken Gruberman – music preparation
- John Newcott – production coordinator
- Robert Silverman – production coordinator
- Yvonne Wish – production coordinator
- Camille Tominaro – production manager
- J. Arthur Thomas – business manager
- Charles M. Schulz – illustration
- Hollis King – art direction
- Watts Design? – design
- Vincent Titolo – photography
- David Benoit – liner notes
- Lee Mendelson – liner notes
- Larry Fitzgerald – management
- Mark Hartley – management

== Charts ==
Chart (2000)	Peak position
US Billboard Jazz Albums	2
