= Freedom at Midnight (album) =

Studio album by David Benoit
- Released: July 7, 1987
- Recorded: 1987
- Studios: Ocean Way Recording (Hollywood, California)
- Genres: Jazz, jazz funk
- Length: 47:58
- Label: GRP
- Producer: Jeffrey Weber

David Benoit chronology
This Side Up (1986)	Freedom at Midnight (1987)	Every Step of the Way (1988)

Freedom at Midnight is an album by American pianist David Benoit released in 1987, recorded for the GRP label. The album reached #5 on Billboard's Contemporary Jazz chart.

== Track listing ==
All tracks written by David Benoit; except as noted.

1. "Freedom at Midnight" (David Benoit, Nathan East) - 4:14
2. "Along the Milky Way" - 4:08
3. "Kei's Song" - 4:39
4. "The Man With The Panama Hat" - 4:18
5. "Pieces Of Time" - 3:16
6. "Morning Sojourn" - 4:22
7. "Tropical Breeze" - 4:43
8. "Passion Walk" - 5:13
9. "Del Sasser" (Sam Jones, Donald Wolf) - 6:03
10. "The Last Goodbye" - 5:52

== Personnel ==
- David Benoit – arrangements, acoustic piano (1, 3–6, 9), Kawai MIDI electric grand piano (2, 7, 8), acoustic piano solo (10)
- Randy Kerber – synthesizers (1–4, 6–8)
- Dann Huff – guitar (1, 2, 4, 8)
- Russ Freeman – guitar (5–7)
- Osamu Kitajima – koto (2)
- Abraham Laboriel – bass (1, 2, 4, 8)
- Bob Feldman – bass (3, 5–7)
- John Pattitucci – acoustic bass (9), upright bass (9)
- Jeff Porcaro – drums (1, 2, 4, 8)
- Tony Morales – drums (3, 5–7, 9)
- Lenny Castro – percussion (1, 2, 4)
- Joe Porcaro – percussion (1, 2, 4, 6, 8), mallets (6)
- Michael Fisher – percussion (3, 5–7)
- Sam Riney – tenor saxophone (1, 7), soprano saxophone (4, 5, 8), alto sax solo (6), alto saxophone (9)

Orchestra

- Suzie Katayama – conductor

Horns

- Gary Herbig and Ray Pizzi – saxophones
- Walter Johnson and John Madrid – trumpet
- Joe Meyer and Richard Todd – French horn

Strings

- Sid Page – concertmaster
- Larry Corbett and Doug David – cello
- Tim Barr and Arni Egilsson – double bass
- Cynthia Morrow and Jimbo Ross – viola
- Becky Barr, Doug Cameron, Bruce Dukov, Pavel Farkas, Clayton Haslop, Pam Henderson, William Henderson, Gina Kronstadt, Sid Page and Arthur Zadinsky – violin

=== Production ===
- Dave Grusin – executive producer
- Larry Rosen – executive producer
- Jeffrey Weber – producer
- Seth Marshall – co-producer
- Bob Loftus – engineer
- Allen Sides – engineer
- Steve MacMillan – additional engineer
- David Ahlert – assistant engineer
- Tony Chiappa – assistant engineer
- Tommy Kane – assistant engineer
- Joe Schiff – assistant engineer
- Bernie Grundman – mastering at Bernie Grundman Mastering (Hollywood, California)
- Bill Giolando – digital assembly
- Gene Shiveley – digital assembly
- Suzie Katayama – production coordinator
- Tim Olsen – production assistant
- Jerold Weber – score supervisor
- Andy Baltimore – creative director, album cover design
- David Gibb – album cover design
- Dan Serrano – album cover design
- Glen Wexler – front and back cover photography

== Charts ==
Chart (1988)	Peak position
Billboard Jazz Albums	5
