= Full Circle (David Benoit album) =

Album by David Benoit

Studio album by David Benoit
- Released: June 27, 2006
- Recorded: 2006
- Studios: Ocean Way Recording (Hollywood, California); JHL Sound (Pacific Palisades, California); Funky Joint Studios (Sherman Oaks, California)
- Genre: Jazz
- Length: 43:17
- Label: Peak
- Producers: Jeffrey Weber; Paul Brown; Jeff Lorber

David Benoit chronology
| Orchestral Stories (2005) | Full Circle (2006) | Heroes (2008) |

Full Circle is an album by American pianist David Benoit released in 2006, and recorded for the Peak label. The album reached #7 on Billboard's contemporary Jazz chart.

== Track listing ==
All tracks written by David Benoit; except as noted.

1. "Cafe Rio" - 4:20
2. "First Day of School" - 4:08
3. "Agua de Beber" (Antônio Carlos Jobim, Vinicius de Moraes) - 3:57
4. "Beat Street" (David Benoit, Jeff Lorber) - 4:15
5. "Six P.M. "- 4:40
6. "Chasing the Tides" - 4:53
7. "Neat With a Twist" (David Benoit, Jeff Lorber) - 5:16
8. "Katrina's Little Bear" - 3:47
9. "Yusuke the Ghost" - 3:36
10. "Monster in the Attic" - 4:35

== Personnel ==
- David Benoit – acoustic piano, arrangements, keyboards (2, 6, 8–10), Hammond B3 organ (10)
- Jeff Lorber – Fender Rhodes (4, 7), synthesizers (4, 7), drum programming (4, 7), arrangements (4, 7)
- Oscar Castro-Neves – acoustic guitar (1, 5)
- Paul Brown – acoustic guitar (2), arrangements (2, 3, 6), guitar solo (3)
- Pat Kelley – guitars (2, 6), acoustic guitar (8)
- Dwight Sills – guitars (4, 7)
- Paul Jackson, Jr. – electric guitar (10)
- Nathan East – bass (1, 10)
- Roberto Vally – bass (2, 3, 6)
- Alex Al – bass (4, 7)
- Brian Bromberg – acoustic bass (5, 9), bass (8)
- John Robinson – drums (1–3, 5, 6, 8–10)
- Michael White – drums (4, 7)
- Alex Acuna – percussion (1, 5)
- Luis Conte – percussion (1–3, 5, 6, 8–10)
- Dan Higgins – saxophones (3), flute (3)
- Gary Meek – saxophones (4, 7)
- Andy Suzuki – tenor saxophone (5)
- Tim Weisberg – flute (5)
- Euge Groove – saxophone (6)
- Bill Reichenbach, Jr. – trombone (3)
- Jerry Hey – trumpet (3), horn arrangements (3)
- Ron King – trumpet (4, 7)
- Rick Braun – trumpet (5)
- Tim Landauer – cello (8)

== Production ==
- David Benoit – executive album producer
- Ron Moss – executive album producer, management
- Andi Howard – executive producer
- Mark Wexler – executive producer
- Jeffrey Weber – producer (1, 5, 8–10)
- Paul Brown – producer (2, 3, 6), mixing (2–4, 6)
- Jeff Lorber – producer (4, 7), engineer (4, 7), recording (4, 7)
- Clark Germain – recording (1–3, 5, 6, 8–10), mixing (1, 5, 8–10), piano recording (4, 7)
- Dragan "DC" Capor – recording (2, 3, 6), mixing (2–4, 6)
- Dwight Sills – engineer (4, 7), recording (4, 7)
- Michael White – engineer (4, 7), recording (4, 7)
- Chris Bellman – mastering at Bernie Grundman Mastering (Hollywood, California)
- Anna Stromberg – music preparation
- William Stromberg – music preparation
- Eric Stonebrook – music preparation
- Janis Stonebrook – music preparation
- Michael Clark – score supervision
- Valerie Ince – A&R coordinator
- Yvonne Wish – production coordinator
- Abbey Anna – art direction
- Andrew Pham – art direction, package design
- Sonny Mediana – group photography
- Carl Studna – solo photography

== Charts ==
| Chart (2006) | Peak position |
|---|---|
| Billboard Jazz Albums | 7 |
