= This Side Up (David Benoit album) =

Studio album by David Benoit
- Released: 1985
- Recorded: March 11–12, 1985
- Studios: Ocean Way Recording (Hollywood, California)
- Genre: Jazz
- Length: 42:00 (CD); 34:17 (vinyl)
- Label: Spindletop/En Pointe
- Producer: Jeffrey Weber

David Benoit chronology
Christmastime (1983)	This Side Up (1985)	Freedom at Midnight (1987)

Professional ratings
Review scores
Source	Rating
Allmusic	2.5/5 stars

This Side Up is an album by American pianist David Benoit released in 1985, recorded for the En Pointe label. The album reached No. 4 on Billboard's Jazz chart.

== Track listing ==
All tracks composed by David Benoit; except where indicated

1. "Beach Trails" - 4:06
2. "Stingray" - 4:55
3. "Land of the Loving" (David Benoit, Mark Winkler) - 4:38
4. "Linus and Lucy" (Vince Guaraldi) - 3:31
5. "Sunset Island" (David Benoit, Nathan East) - 5:59
6. "Hymm for Aquino" - 4:43
7. "Santa Barbara" - 3:52
8. "Waltz for Debby" - (Bill Evans) - 2:33
9. "Landscapes" - 7:43 **CD release only

== Personnel ==
- David Benoit – acoustic piano, keyboards (1, 2, 7), arrangements, conductor (8)
- Michael Lang – keyboards (1, 6)
- Randy Kerber – keyboards (2–5)
- Jerold Weber – keyboards (6)
- Grant Geissman – guitars (1, 6, 7)
- Paul Jackson, Jr. – guitars (2–5)
- Bob Feldman – bass (1, 6–8)
- Nathan East – bass (2–5)
- Tony Morales – drums (1, 6–8)
- John Robinson – drums (2–5)
- Del Blake – percussion (1, 6)
- Bobbye Hall – percussion (2–5)
- Michael Fisher – percussion (7)
- Brandon Fields – alto saxophone (3, 5)
- Ernie Watts – soprano saxophone (6)
- Sam Riney – alto saxophone (7)
- William Henderson – concertmaster (1, 6, 8)
- Kenneth Bonebrake – conductor (1, 6)
- The L. A. Modern String Orchestra – orchestra (1, 6, 8)
- Dianne Reeves – vocals (3)

== Production ==
- Seth Marshall – executive producer
- W. Barry Wilson – executive producer
- Jeffrey Weber – producer, score supervision, LP concept
- Allen Sides – recording
- Judy Clapp – recording assistant
- Tony Chiappa – recording assistant
- David Egerton – recording assistant
- Terry Dunavan – mastering
- Ken Gruberman – music copyist
- Jo Bertone – art direction, design (LP)
- Bob Wynne – art direction, design (CD)
- Jennifer Maxon – photography

== Charts ==
Chart (1986)	Peak position
Billboard Jazz Albums	4
