= American Landscape (David Benoit album) =

Studio album by David Benoit
- Released: 1997
- Recorded: 1997
- Studio: 29th Street Studios (Torrance, California); The Village Recorder (Los Angeles, California); CTS Studios (Wembley, UK)
- Genre: Jazz
- Length: 42:40
- Label: GRP
- Producer: Al Schmitt; David Benoit

David Benoit chronology
Remembering Christmas (1996)	American Landscape (1997)	Professional Dreamer (1999)

Professional ratings
Review scores
Source	Rating
AllMusic	2/5 stars

American Landscape is an album by the American pianist David Benoit. It was released in 1997 via the GRP label. The album reached No. 7 on Billboard's Jazz chart.

== Critical reception ==
AllMusic noted that "the energetic closer 'Speed Racer' builds from a soft orchestral intro into a full-on Western horse race between Benoit and banjo virtuoso Béla Fleck, then combines a jazz trio with a dramatic orchestral underscore."

== Track listing ==
All tracks written and composed by David Benoit.

1. "American Landscape" - 4:23
2. "Max's Boogie" - 4:23
3. "Lost in Tokyo" - 3:35
4. "If I Can Believe" - 6:23
5. "A Personal Story" - 4:54
6. "Rue de la Soleil" - 4:24
7. "Saying Goodbye" - 4:53
8. "Mr. Rodriguez's Opus" - 4:54
9. "Speed Racer" - 5:51

== Personnel ==
- David Benoit – acoustic piano, arrangements (1–4, 6, 7), orchestra arrangements and conductor (1, 4, 5, 8, 9)
- Pat Kelley – fretted instruments (1, 4, 5, 8, 9)
- Béla Fleck – banjo (1, 9)
- Dean Parks – guitar (2, 3, 6, 7)
- Nathan East – bass (1, 4, 5, 8, 9)
- Ken Wild – bass (2, 3, 6, 7)
- John Robinson – drums (1, 4, 5, 8, 9)
- Carlos Vega – drums (2, 3, 6, 7)
- Luis Conte – percussion
- Poncho Sanchez – congas (8)
- Tommy Morgan – harmonica (1, 9)
- Eric Marienthal – alto saxophone, soprano saxophone
- Jerry Hey – trumpet (8)
- David Blumberg – arrangements (5, 8, 9)
- The London Symphony Orchestra – orchestra (1, 4, 5, 8, 9)

== Production ==
- Tommy LiPuma – executive producer
- David Benoit – producer
- Al Schmitt – producer, engineer, mixing
- Bill Smith – engineer
- David Nottingham – second engineer
- Luis Rodriguez – second engineer
- Toby Woods – second engineer
- Doug Sax – mastering at The Mastering Lab (Hollywood, California)
- Ken Gruberman at Quill Music Services – music preparation
- Dianna Mich Newell – project coordinator
- Hollis King – art direction
- Kevin Gaor – graphic design
- Will Klemm – illustration
- Tracy Lamonica – photography
- Sally Field – liner notes
- Fitzgerald Hartley Co. – management

== Charts ==
Chart (1997)	Peak position
Billboard Jazz Albums	7
