= Heroes (David Benoit album) =

Studio album by David Benoit
- Released: May 27, 2008
- Recorded: December 18–20, 2007
- Studio: Paramount Recording Studios (Hollywood, California)
- Genre: Jazz
- Length: 39:51 (Standard release); 46:20 (Japan release)
- Label: Peak
- Producer: David Benoit

David Benoit chronology
Full Circle (2006)	Heroes (2008)	Earthglow (2010)

Heroes is an album by American pianist David Benoit released in 2008 and recorded for the Peak label. The album is Benoit's tribute to his musical 'heroes' who influenced his career, including Bill Evans, Dave Brubeck, and Dave Grusin.

Heroes reached No. 9 on the Billboard Contemporary Jazz Albums chart.

== Track listing ==
1. "Mountain Dance" (Dave Grusin) - 4:04
2. "Human Nature" (John Bettis, Steve Porcaro) - 4:12
3. "Your Song" (Elton John, Bernie Taupin) - 3:49
4. "Light My Fire" (Robbie Krieger, John Densmore, Jim Morrison, Ray Manzarek) - 4:00
5. "Never Can Say Goodbye" (Clifton Davis) - 4:19
6. "She's Leaving Home" (John Lennon, Paul McCartney) - 3:35
7. "Song for My Father" (Horace Silver) - 3:20
8. "You Look Good to Me" (Walter Donaldson) - 2:56
9. "Waltz for Debby" (Bill Evans) - 5:03*
10. "A Twisted Little Etude" (David Benoit) - 2:29
11. "Blue Rondo à la Turk" (Dave Brubeck) - 5:00
12. "If I Were a Bell" (Frank Loesser) - 3:23 [Bonus Track on Japanese Edition]
- "Waltz for Debby" (track 9) is incorrectly listed in the liner notes as "Waltz for Debbie"

== Personnel ==
- David Benoit – grand piano, synthesizers, arrangements and conductor
- David Hughes – acoustic bass, electric bass
- Jamey Tate – drums
- Brad Dutz – percussion
- Andy Suzuki – alto saxophone, tenor saxophone
- Cathy Biagini – cello
- John Wang – viola
- Yun Tang – violin, concertmaster
- Darryl Tanikawa – music contractor

== Production ==
- Ron Moss – executive album producer
- Andi Howard – executive producer
- Mark Wexler – executive producer
- David Benoit – producer
- Clark Germain – recording, mixing
- Rob Montez – assistant engineer
- Chris Bellman – mastering at Bernie Grundman Mastering (Hollywood, California)
- Valerie Ince – A&R coordinator
- Yvonne Wish – project coordinator
- Sonny Mediana – art direction, design, photography

== Charts ==
Chart (2008)	Peak position
US Jazz Albums (Billboard)	9
