= Right Here, Right Now (David Benoit album) =

Studio album by David Benoit
- Released: October 14, 2003
- Recorded: 2003
- Studio: Bill Schnee Studios (North Hollywood, California); Brauntasoarus Studios and Rupert House (Woodland Hills, California); Castle Oaks Studios (Calabasas, California); Bay 7 Studios (Village Valley, California)
- Genre: Jazz
- Length: 50:17
- Label: GRP
- Producer: Rick Braun

David Benoit chronology
Fuzzy Logic (2002)	Right Here, Right Now (2003)	The Benoit/Freeman Project 2 (2004)

Right Here, Right Now is an album by American pianist David Benoit released in 2003, and recorded for the GRP label. The album reached #10 on Billboard's Jazz chart.

== Track listing ==
All tracks composed by David Benoit; except where indicated

1. "Watermelon Man" (Herbie Hancock) - 5:23
2. "Right Here, Right Now" (David Benoit, Rick Braun) - 4:38
3. "Le Grand" (David Benoit, Michael Forman) - 5:27
4. "Don't Know Why" (Jesse Harris) - 4:32
5. "Jellybeans and Chocolate" (David Benoit, Rick Braun) - 5:13
6. "Third Encounter" - 5:45
7. "Swingin' Waikiki" - 5:37
8. "Don't Let Me Be Lonely Tonight" (James Taylor) - 4:12
9. "Wistful Thinking" - 4:32
10. "Quiet Room" - 3:58

== Personnel ==
- David Benoit – acoustic piano, Wurlitzer electric piano (1), arrangements (1–7, 9, 10), string pad (2), synthesizer programming (2), Fender Rhodes (5), Hammond B3 organ (5), string arrangements and conductor (8)
- Pat Kelley – guitar (1, 3, 4, 7–10)
- Tony Maiden – guitar (1, 5)
- Randy Jacobs – guitar (2)
- Peter White – guitar solo (8)
- Kevin Axt – bass (1, 4, 8)
- Nathan East – bass (3, 6)
- Freddie Washington – bass (5)
- Dean Taba – bass (6, 7, 9, 10)
- Land Richards – drums (1, 4, 6, 8)
- Bud Harner – drums (2)
- Steve Ferrone – drums (3, 5, 6)
- Jeff Olson – drums (7, 9)
- Paulinho da Costa – percussion (1, 3, 4, 6, 7)
- Luis Conte – percussion (2)
- Lenny Castro – percussion (5)
- Brad Dutz – percussion (8)
- Euge Groove – tenor saxophone (5)
- Andy Suzuki – tenor saxophone (7, 9)
- Nick Lane – trombone (1, 2), horn arrangements (1, 2, 5)
- Brian Culbertson – trombone (5)
- Rick Braun – trumpet (1), party and fun stuff effects (1), arrangements (1, 2, 3, 5, 6), horn arrangements (1, 2, 5), synthesizer programming (2), computer programming (6), flugelhorn (10)
- Wayne Bergeron – trumpet (2)

Strings (Track 8)

- Suzie Katayama – contractor
- Sid Page – concertmaster
- Anna Bonn, John Eidsvoog, Julie Eidsvoog and Suzie Katayama – copyists
- Kevin Axt, Dom Genova and David Stone – bass
- Larry Corbett, Dan Smith and Rudy Stein – cello
- Denyse Buffum, Carole Mukogawa, Jimbo Ross and Evan Wilson – viola
- Eve Butler, Susan Chatman, Kirsten Fife, Larry Greenfield, Sara Parkins, Alyssa Park, Cameron Patrick, Anatoly Rosinsky, John Wittenberg and Margaret Wooten – violin

== Production ==
- Rick Braun – producer
- Clark Germain – tracking engineer, mixing
- Steve Sykes – tracking engineer, mixing
- Jeff Davis – technical assistant
- Chris Bellman – mastering at Bernie Grundman Mastering (Hollywood, California)
- Bud Harner – A&R direction
- Marsha Black – A&R administration
- Yvonne Wish – project coordinator
- John Newcott – release coordinator
- Kelly Pratt – release coordinator
- Hollis King – art direction
- Rika Ichiki – design
- Rocky Schenck – photography
- Ron Moss at Chapman & Co. Management – management

== Charts ==
Chart (2003)	Peak position
Billboard Jazz Albums	10
