= Urban Daydreams =

Studio album by David Benoit
- Released: April 17, 1989
- Recorded: 1989
- Studios: Sunset Sound (Hollywood); Capitol Studios (Hollywood); Image Recording Studios (Hollywood); Aire L. A. (Glendale, California)
- Genre: Jazz
- Length: 46:40
- Label: GRP
- Producers: Don Grusin; David Benoit

David Benoit chronology
Every Step of the Way (1988)	Urban Daydreams (1989)	Waiting for Spring (1989)

Urban Daydreams is an album by American pianist David Benoit released in 1989, recorded for the GRP label. The album reached #3 on Billboard's Contemporary Jazz chart.

== Track listing ==
All tracks composed by David Benoit; except where indicated

1. "Sailing Through the City" (Don Grusin) - 5:12
2. "Cloud Break" - 4:24
3. "Urban Daydreams" - 5:48
4. "When the Winter's Gone" (David Benoit, David Pack, Jennifer Warnes) - 4:11
5. "Snow Dancing" - 5:51
6. "Safari" (David Benoit, Don Grusin) - 5:11
7. "Wild Kids" (David Benoit, Don Grusin) - 4:22
8. "Looking Back" - 2:09
9. "Seattle Morning" - 4:06
10. "As If I Could Reach Rainbows" - 3:51

"Wild Kids" was written as the theme for the This Is America, Charlie Brown episode "The Great Inventors".

== Personnel ==
- David Benoit – acoustic piano, keyboards (1–3), arrangements (1, 3, 6–8), orchestra conductor (3, 8), synthesizer programming (5, 6, 8)
- Don Grusin – synthesizer programming (1–3, 5–8), arrangements (1, 6, 7), drum programming (3, 6, 8), keyboards (4, 7)
- Oscar Castro-Neves – acoustic guitar (6)
- Jimmy Johnson – bass (1–3, 5, 7–9)
- Abraham Laboriel – bass (4)
- Carlos Vega – drums (1–3, 5, 7–9)
- Alex Acuña – drums (4)
- Eric Marienthal – alto saxophone (1, 5), soprano saxophone (6, 7)
- Gary Herbig – alto saxophone (8), clarinet (8)
- Judd Miller – electronic valve instrument (1–3, 6, 8)
- Bruce Dukov – concertmaster (3, 8)
- Gina Kronstadt – orchestra contractor (3, 8)
- The Warfield Avenue Symphony Orchestra (3, 8)
- Jennifer Warnes – vocals (4)

== Production ==
- Dave Grusin – executive producer
- Larry Rosen – executive producer
- David Benoit – producer
- Don Grusin – producer
- Don Murray – engineer, mixing
- Leslie Ann Jones – additional engineer
- Greg Barrett – assistant engineer
- Peter Doell – assistant engineer
- Sam Gladstein – assistant engineer
- David Glover – assistant engineer
- David Knight – assistant engineer
- Charlie Paakkari – assistant engineer
- Brian Sauter – assistant engineer
- Squeak Stone – assistant engineer
- Wally Traugott – mastering
- Tim Olsen – music coordinator
- Suzanne Sherman – GRP production coordinator
- Andy Baltimore – GRP creative director, graphic design, front and back cover photography
- David Gibb – graphic design
- Dave Kunze – graphic design
- Dan Serrano – graphic design
- Mitchell Hartman – front and back photo illustration
- Chris Cuffaro – black and white photography, back cover photo of David Benoit
- Ted Cohen – management
- Digital editing at CMS Digital (Pasadena, California)
- Digitally mixed and mastered at Capitol Studios (Hollywood, California).

== Charts ==
Chart (1989)	Peak position
Billboard Jazz Albums	3
