= Letter to Evan (David Benoit album) =

Studio album by David Benoit
- Released: October 27, 1992
- Recorded: 1992
- Studio: Ocean Way Recording (Hollywood, California); Clinton Recording Studios (New York City, New York)
- Genre: Jazz
- Length: 47:58
- Label: GRP
- Producer: David Benoit; Jeffrey Weber

David Benoit chronology
Shadows (1991)	Letter to Evan (1992)	The Benoit/Freeman Project (1994)

Professional ratings
Review scores
Source	Rating
AllMusic	3/5 stars

Letter to Evan is an album by American pianist David Benoit released in 1992, recorded for the GRP label. The album reached #3 on Billboard's Jazz chart.

== Track listing ==
No.	Title	Writer(s)	Length
1.	"Letter to Evan"	Bill Evans	5:12
2.	"Waiting for Love"	David Benoit	4:44
3.	"On Golden Pond"	Dave Grusin	4:11
4.	"The Island"	Ivan Lins; Victor Martins	4:37
5.	"Looking Over Eastlake"	David Benoit	3:47
6.	"Knit for Mary F."	Bill Evans	3:54
7.	"Kathy's Waltz"	Dave Brubeck	3:24
8.	"Things Are Getting Better"	David Benoit	2:59
9.	"Spring Can Really Hang You Up the Most"	Tommy Wolf; Fran Landesman	5:28
10.	"Take 6"	David Benoit	5:23
11.	"Blues at Sunset"	David Benoit	4:19
Total length:			47:58

== Personnel ==
- David Benoit – acoustic piano, arrangements and conductor
- Peter Sprague – guitar (2, 10)
- Larry Carlton – guitar (3, 4, 9, 11)
- Dori Caymmi – guitar (8)
- John Patitucci – bass (1, 2, 4, 6)
- Steve Bailey – bass (3, 5, 11), acoustic bass guitar (8)
- Charnett Moffett – bass (7)
- Dave Enos – bass (10)
- Peter Erskine – drums (1, 2, 4, 6, 10)
- Terri Lyne Carrington – drums (3, 11), surdo (8), tambourine (8)
- Al Foster – drums (7)
- Luis Conte – batá drum (5), finger cymbals (5), triangle (5, 8), bongos (8), djembe (8), assorted percussion (8)
- Michael Fisher – clay marimba (8), pandeiro (8), shaker (8), whistle (8), assorted percussion (8)
- Jim Walker – flute (3), pan flute (3)
- James Thatcher – French horn (5)
- Steve Erdody – cello (3)
- Larry Corbett – cello (5)

== Production ==
- Dave Grusin – executive producer
- Larry Rosen – executive producer
- David Benoit – producer, liner notes
- Jeffrey Weber – producer
- Allen Sides – recording (1–6, 8–11)
- Ed Rak – recording (7)
- Eric Rudd – recording assistant (1–6, 8–11)
- Bart Stevens – recording assistant (1–6, 8–11)
- Neil Dignon – recording assistant (7)
- Troy Halderson – recording assistant (7)
- Bernie Grundman – mastering at Bernie Grundman Mastering (Hollywood, California)
- Ken Gruberman – music preparation
- Suzie Katayama – music preparation
- Tim Aller – music coordinator
- Michael Pollard – GRP production coordinator
- Doreen Kalcich – production coordinating assistant
- Richard Veloso – art production
- Andy Baltimore – GRP creative director
- Reid Philip Weimer – front cover art
- Scott Johnson – graphic design
- Sonny Mediana – graphic design
- Andy Ruggirello – graphic design
- Dan Serrano – graphic design
- Sharon Franklin – graphic design assistant
- Bill Loving – black and white photography
- Dennis Keeley – color photography
- The Fitzgerald/Hartley Co. – management

== Charts ==
Billboard
Year	Chart	Position
1993	Traditional Jazz Albums	3
1993	Jazz Albums	50
