= Waiting for Spring (album) =

Studio album by David Benoit
- Released: October 2, 1989
- Recorded: February 5 & May 25, 1989
- Studio: Ocean Way Recording (Hollywood, California)
- Genre: Jazz
- Length: 51:52 (CD)
- Label: GRP
- Producer: Jeffrey Weber; David Benoit

David Benoit chronology
Urban Daydreams (1989)	Waiting for Spring (1989)	Inner Motion (1990)

Waiting for Spring is an album by American pianist David Benoit released in 1989 and recorded for the GRP label. The album reached No. 1 on the Billboard Jazz Albums chart.

== Track listing ==
All tracks written by David Benoit except as noted.

No.	Title	Writer(s)	Length
1.	"Waiting for Spring"		5:08
2.	"After the Snow Falls"		3:21
3.	"Cast Your Fate to the Wind"	Vince Guaraldi, Carl Rowe	3.13
4.	"Turn Out the Stars"	Bill Evans	2:33
5.	"Cabin Fever"		3:57
6.	"Cat on a Windowsill"		4:38
7.	"Some Other Sunset"		4:58
8.	"My Romance"	Richard Rodgers, Lorenz Hart	8:15
9.	"Funkallero"	Bill Evans	3:35
10.	"I Remember Bill Evans"		3:23
11.	"Fireside" (CD only)		4:32
12.	"Secret Love" (CD only)	Sammy Fain, Paul Francis Webster	3:33

== Personnel ==
- David Benoit – grand piano
- Emily Remler – guitar (1–11)
- Bob Benoit – guitar (12)
- Luther Hughes – bass (1, 2, 4, 5, 7–12)
- John Patitucci – bass (3, 6)
- Peter Erskine – drums

== Production ==
- Dave Grusin – executive producer
- Larry Rosen – executive producer
- David Benoit – producer
- Jeffrey Weber – producer
- Allen Sides – engineer, mixing
- Steve Holroyd – assistant engineer
- Mike Ross – assistant engineer
- Michael Landy – digital editing at The Review Room (New York City, New York)
- Ted Jensen – mastering at Sterling Sound (New York City, New York)
- Tim Olsen – music coordinator
- Suzanne Sherman – GRP production coordinator
- Andy Baltimore – GRP creative director, front cover photography
- Jeff Sedlik – back cover photography, black and white photography
- Lee Cory – graphic design
- David Gibb – graphic design
- Andy Ruggirello – graphic design
- Dan Serrano – graphic design
- Sandra Bojin – stylist
- Lucy Baldock – grooming

== Charts ==
Chart (1989)	Peak position
Billboard Jazz Albums	1
