= The Benoit/Freeman Project 2 =

Drive

Studio album by David Benoit and Russ Freeman
- Released: June 22, 2004
- Recorded: 2004
- Studio: Record One (Los Angeles, California); The Tracking Room (Nashville, Tennessee); Sound Kitchen (Franklin, Tennessee)
- Genre: Jazz
- Length: 46:23
- Label: Peak Records
- Producer: Russ Freeman; David Benoit

David Benoit and Russ Freeman chronology
Right Here, Right Now (2003)	Drive (2004)	Orchestral Stories (2005)

The Benoit Freeman Project 2 is a collaboration album by American pianist David Benoit and American guitarist Russ Freeman released in 2004, and recorded for the Peak label. The album reached #7 on Billboard's Jazz chart.
Russ Freeman also serves as leader and frontman for the Rippingtons.

== Track listing ==
All tracks composed by David Benoit and Russ Freeman; except where indicated

1. "Palmetto Park" - 4:01
2. "Via Nueve" - 5:17
3. "Montecito" (Russ Freeman) - 4:40
4. "Club Havana" (Russ Freeman) - 5:37
5. "Two Survivors" (Al Anderson, Nicholas Gary) - 5:04
6. "Samba" - 4:48
7. "Moon Through the Window" (David Benoit) - 4:30
8. "Struttin'" - 4:42
9. "Stiletto Heels" - 4:12
10. "Waiting for the Stars to Fall" (Russ Freeman) - 3:32

== Personnel ==
- David Benoit – acoustic piano, Fender Rhodes, Yamaha MOTIF 8, orchestra arrangements and conductor (2, 5, 7, 10)
- Russ Freeman – synthesizers, acoustic guitar, classical guitar, electric guitar, guitar synthesizer
- Dave Carpenter – bass (2)
- Byron House – bass (6)
- Vinnie Colaiuta – drums (1, 4, 6–10)
- Peter Erskine – drums (2, 5)
- Luis Conte – percussion
- Chris Botti – trumpet (4, 8)
- David Pack – vocals (3)
- Vince Gill – vocals (5)

The Nashville String Machine (Tracks 2, 5, 7 & 10):

- Carl Gorodetzky – concertmaster
- Julie Eidsvoog, John Eidsvoog and Suzie Katayama – music preparation
- Ann Richards – flute
- Bobby Taylor – oboe
- Jennifer Kummer – French Horn
- Jack Jezioro and Craig Nelson – double bass
- Anthony LaMarchina, Bob Mason and Carole Rabinowitz – cello
- Jim Grosjean, Gary Vanosdale and Kristin Wilkinson – viola
- David Angell, Janet Askey, David Davidson, Conni Ellisor, Carl Gorodetzky, Gerald Greer, Lee Larrison, Cate Myer, Pamela Sixfin, Alan Umstead, Cathy Umstead and Mary Kathryn Vanosdale – violin

== Production ==
- Andi Howard – executive producer, management (for Russ Freeman)
- Mark Wexler – executive producer
- Russ Freeman – executive producer, producer, vocal producer (5)
- David Benoit – producer
- Steve Bishir – engineer
- Clark Germain – engineer
- Jason Lefan – assistant engineer
- Tom Sweeney – assistant engineer
- Matt Weeks – assistant engineer
- Steve Sykes – mixing
- Robert Hadley – mastering
- Doug Sax – mastering
- The Mastering Lab (Hollywood, California) – mastering location
- Traci Sterling Bashir – production coordinator
- Sonny Mediana – art direction, photography
- Ron Moss (Chapman & Co.) – management (for David Benoit)

== Charts ==
Chart (2004)	Peak position
Billboard Jazz Albums	7
