= Remembering Christmas =

Studio album by David Benoit
- Released: 1996
- Recorded: 1996
- Studio: 29th Street Studio (Torrance, California); Ocean Way Recording (Hollywood, California); The Hit Factory (New York City, New York); Make Believe Ballroom (West Shokan, New York)
- Genre: Jazz
- Length: 50:14
- Label: GRP
- Producer: David Benoit

David Benoit chronology
The Best of David Benoit 1987-1995 (1995)	Remembering Christmas (1996)	American Landscape (1997)

Remembering Christmas is an album by American pianist David Benoit released by GRP Records in 1996. The album reached #15 on Billboard's Contemporary Jazz chart.

== Track listing ==
1. "Skating" (Vince Guaraldi, Lee Mendelson) - 4:40
2. "Santa Claus Is Coming to Town" (John Frederick Coots, Haven Gillespie) - 4:47
3. "Angels We Have Heard on High" (Traditional) - 4:32
4. "Christmas Time Is Here" (Vince Guaraldi, Lee Mendelson) - 4:09
5. "Jesu, Joy of Man's Desiring" (Johann Sebastian Bach) - 3:07
6. "Hark! The Herald Angels Sing" (Charles Wesley, Felix Mendelssohn) - 4:28
7. "Do You Hear What I Hear" (Gloria Shayne Baker, Noel Regney) - 4:36
8. "Christmas Is Coming" (Vince Guaraldi) - 3:53
9. "Silent Night" (Franz Xaver Gruber, Joseph Mohr) - 4:02
10. "Remembering Christmas" (David Benoit) - 4:35
11. "The First Noel" (Traditional) - 4:16
12. "The Christmas Song" (Mel Torme, Robert Wells) - 3:10

== Personnel ==
- David Benoit – acoustic piano
- Dave Brubeck – acoustic piano (6)
- Earl Klugh – guitar (1)
- Pat Kelley – guitar
- Ernest Tibbs – guitar
- Bob Benoit – guitar (12)
- John Pattitucci – bass
- Tony Morales – drums (1–3, 5–12)
- Harvey Mason – drums (4)
- Brad Dutz – percussion
- Michael Franks – lead vocals (4)

== Production ==
- David Benoit – producer, arrangements
- Clark Germain – engineer (1–3, 5–12), mixing (1–3, 5–12)
- Tom Mack – engineer (4)
- Elliot Scheiner – remixing (4)
- Eddie Miller – assistant engineer (1–3, 5–12)
- Luis Jose Rodriguez – assistant engineer (1–3, 5–12)
- Ken Ross – assistant engineer (1–3, 5–12)
- Bernie Grundman – mastering at Bernie Grundman Mastering (Hollywood, California)
- Ken Gruberman – music preparation
- Diana Mich Newell – project coordinator
- Jason Claiborne – graphic design
- Hollis King – art direction
- Tracy Lamonica – photography

== Charts ==
Chart (1996)	Peak position
Billboard Jazz Albums	15
