= Fuzzy Logic (David Benoit album) =

Album by David Benoit

Studio album by David Benoit
- Released: February 5, 2002
- Recorded: March–July 2001
- Studio: Ocean Way Recording and Capitol Records Studio A (Hollywood, California); O'Henry Sound Studios (Burbank, California); Sonic Soundbox (San Pedro, California); Brauntosoarus Studios (Woodland Hills, California); The Village Recorder (Los Angeles, California); Village Studios (London, UK)
- Genre: Jazz
- Length: 44:51
- Label: GRP
- Producer: Rick Braun; David Benoit; Stuart Wade

David Benoit chronology
| Here's to You, Charlie Brown: 50 Great Years! (2000) | Fuzzy Logic (2002) | Right Here, Right Now (2003) |

Fuzzy Logic is an album by American pianist David Benoit released on February 5, 2002, and recorded for the GRP label. The album reached #6 on Billboard's Contemporary Jazz chart. "Then the Morning Comes", a cover of the 1999 single by American rock group Smash Mouth, received play on smooth jazz radio in the United States.

== Critical reception ==
The album received a score of four stars out of five from AllMusic. An album review for PopMatters, written by Maurice Bottomley, opined that the record contained "no jazz to speak of, just well arranged incidental music". Writing in the February 16, 2002, issue of Billboard, critic Steve Graybow praised the album's funk influences and its use of a live drummer rather than programmed drums, concluding that the album "allows the music to breathe in a way heard all too infrequently in the smooth jazz genre." Billboard further gave the album a "pick" designation, denoting that the album was expected to debut within the top half of its respective chart.

== Track listing ==
All tracks composed by David Benoit; except where indicated

1. "Snap!" (David Benoit, Rick Braun) - 4:24
2. "Fuzzy Logic" - 5:09
3. "Someday Soon" (David Benoit, Rick Braun) - 4:55
4. "Then the Morning Comes" (John Barry, Greg Camp) - 3:35
5. "Reflections" - 4:03
6. "Coming Up for Air" (Stuart Wade, Neil Angilley, David Benoit) - 4:56
7. "You Read My Mind" (David Benoit, Rick Braun, Stan Sargeant) - 4:51
8. "War of the S.U.V.'s" - 4:44
9. "Tango in Barbados" (Stuart Wade, Neil Angilley, David Benoit) - 4:13
10. "One Dream at a Time (June's Song)" - 2:51

== Personnel ==
- David Benoit – acoustic piano, Hammond B3 organ (2, 4, 8), arrangements (2, 4, 5, 8, 10), conductor (5, 10)
- Rick Braun – programming (1, 7), trumpet (1, 2, 8), arrangements (1, 3, 7)
- Neil Angilley – keyboards (6, 9)
- Dave Tyler – programming (6, 9)
- Ross Bolton – guitar (1)
- Pat Kelly – guitar (2, 5, 8), lead guitar (4)
- Tony Maiden – guitar (2), rhythm guitar (4)
- Paul Jackson, Jr. – guitar (3)
- Ian Crabtree – guitar (6, 9)
- Abraham Laboriel – bass (2, 4, 8)
- Roberto Vally – bass (3)
- Dean Taba – bass (5)
- Phil Mulford – bass (6, 9)
- Stan Sargeant – bass (7)
- Steve Ferrone – drums (2, 4, 8)
- Jeff Olson – drums (5)
- Brad Dutz – percussion (3, 8)
- Larry Bunker – vibraphone (4, 5)
- Scott Breadman – percussion (7)
- Mick Wilson – timbales (9)
- Andy Suzuki – saxophone (2, 8)
- Tim Weisberg – flute (5, 8, 10)
- Jon Clarke – oboe (5, 10)
- Nick Lane – trombone (1, 2)
- Steve Holtman – trombone (2)
- Rick Baptist – trumpet (2)
- Richard Todd – French horn (5, 10)
- Suzie Katayama – orchestra contractor (2, 4, 5, 8, 10)
- Ken Gruberman – music preparation (2, 4, 5, 8, 10)
- Stuart Wade – arrangements (6, 9)

== Production ==
- Bud Harner – executive producer
- Rick Braun – producer (1, 3, 7)
- David Benoit – producer (2, 4, 5, 8, 10)
- Stuart Wade – producer (6, 9)
- Steve Sykes – recording and mixing (1, 3, 7)
- Clark Germain – recording and mixing (2, 4, 5, 8, 10)
- Mick Wilson – recording and mixing (6, 9)
- Charlie Paakkari – assistant engineer (3)
- Chris Bellman – mastering at Bernie Grundman Mastering (Hollywood, California)
- Yvonne Wish – production coordinator
- John Newcott – release coordinator
- Kelly Pratt – release coordinator
- Hollis King – art direction
- Rika Ichiki – design
- Dave Ellis – illustration
- Rocky Schenck – photography
- The Fitzgerald Hartley Co. – management

== Charts ==
| Chart (2002) | Peak position |
|---|---|
| Billboard Jazz Albums | 6 |
