= Marc Antoine (musician) =

French jazz guitarist

- Born: Marc Jean Roland Antoine Vouilloux; 28 May 1963 (age 62); Paris, France
- Genres: Smooth jazz, jazz fusion, classical
- Occupation: Musician
- Instrument: Guitar
- Years active: 1994–present
- Labels: GRP, Peak, Rendezvous
- Website: www.marcantoine.com

Marc Jean Roland Antoine Vouilloux (born 28 May 1963) known professionally as Marc Antoine, is a French jazz guitarist.

He was born Marc Jean Roland Antoine Vouilloux in Paris, France. Hi-Lo Split, was released by Peak Records in 2007; the album features a cover of R&B and jazz classic "Spooky".

== Discography ==
- Classical Soul (GRP, 1994)
- Urban Gypsy (GRP, 1995)
- Get Shorty Soundtrack (1995)
- Madrid (GRP, 1998)
- Universal Language (GRP, 2000)
- Cruisin' (GRP, 2001)
- Mediterranéo (Rendezvous Entertainment, 2003)
- Modern Times (Rendezvous, 2005)
- Hi-Lo Split (Peak, 2007)
- Foreign Exchange with Paul Brown (Peak, 2009)
- My Classical Way (Frazzy Frog, 2010)
- Guitar Destiny (Frazzy Frog, 2012)
- Laguna Beach (Woodward Avenue, 2016)
- So Nice with David Benoit (Shanachie, 2017)
- Something About Her (Shanachie, 2021)
