= David Benoit =

American jazz pianist (born 1953)

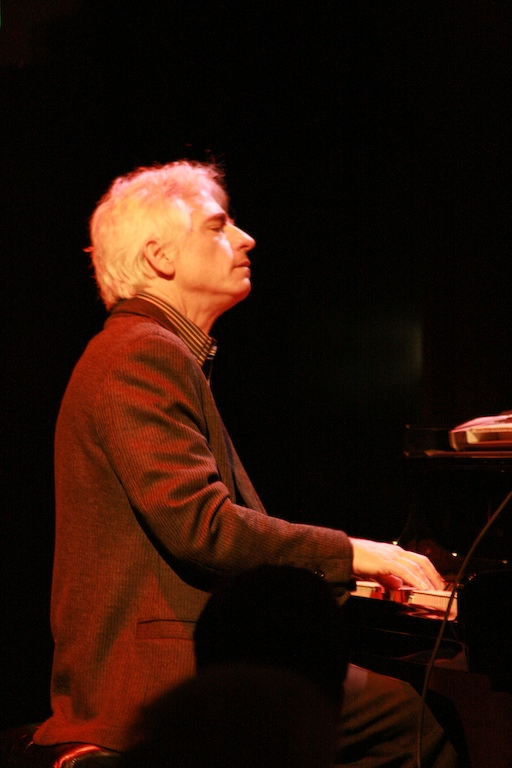
- David Benoit performing at Jazz Alley on March 16, 2007

Background information
- Born: David Bryan Benoit; August 18, 1953 (age 73); Bakersfield, California, U.S.
- Genres: Jazz, smooth jazz, easy listening
- Occupations: Musician, composer, producer
- Instrument: Piano
- Years active: 1976–present
- Labels: AVI, GRP, Peak
- Website: www.davidbenoitmusic.com

David Bryan Benoit (born August 18, 1953) is an American jazz pianist, composer and producer, based in Los Angeles, California, United States. Benoit has charted over 25 albums since 1980, and has been nominated for three Grammy Awards. He is also music director for the Pacific Vision Youth Symphony (previously known as the Asia America Symphony Orchestra) and the Asia America Youth Orchestra. Furthermore, crediting Vince Guaraldi as an inspiration, Benoit has participated both as performer and music director for the later animated adaptations of the Peanuts comic strip, such as the feature film, The Peanuts Movie, restoring Guaraldi's musical signature to the franchise.

== Early life ==
David Bryan Benoit was born in Bakersfield, California, on August 18, 1953. He studied piano at age 13 with Marya Cressy Wright and continued his training with Abraham Fraser, who was the pianist for Arturo Toscanini. He attended Mira Costa High School. He focused on theory and composition at El Camino College, studying orchestration with Donald Nelligan, and later took film scoring classes taught by Donald Ray at UCLA. His education in music conducting began with Heiichiro Ohyama, assistant conductor of the L.A. Philharmonic, and continued with Jan Robertson, head of the conducting department at UCLA. He worked with Jeffrey Schindler, Music Director for the UC Santa Barbara symphony orchestra.

== Career ==
He began his career as a musical director and conductor for Lainie Kazan in 1976, before moving on to similar roles with singer/actresses Ann-Margret and Connie Stevens.

His GRP Records debut album, Freedom at Midnight (1987), made it to number 5 on Billboard's Top Contemporary Jazz Albums chart. Benoit also says that it was his favorite album to produce, because it was when "everything came together," as he stated in an interview on SmoothViews.com. An earlier "live in the studio" (direct record, no mixing or overdubs) album on Spindletop Records, This Side Up (previously 1986), was re-released on the GRP label.

Waiting for Spring (1989) made it to number 1 on Billboard's Top Jazz Albums chart. Shadows, from 1991, made it to number 2 on the Top Contemporary Jazz Albums chart.

Out of respect for one of his main influences, Bill Evans, he dedicated his 1992 album Letter to Evan to him.

Many of his songs employ a string section, most notably on his American Landscape (1997) and Orchestral Stories (2005) albums.

In 2000, after the death of Peanuts creator Charles M. Schulz, he released a memorial album titled Here's to You, Charlie Brown: 50 Great Years!. Collaborators included the chorus group Take 6, guitarist Marc Antoine and trumpeter Chris Botti. He also scored several "Peanuts" animated television specials, emulating the style of Vince Guaraldi. The album made it to number 2 on the Top Jazz Albums chart. An earlier cover of Guaraldi's "Linus and Lucy", recorded in 1985 for the aforementioned album This Side Up, enjoyed notable radio airplay and helped to launch the smooth jazz genre.

Benoit has arranged, conducted, and performed music for many popular pop and jazz artists, including Russ Freeman and the Rippingtons (he was involved with the band in its formative stages, and they often appeared on each other's albums), Kenny Loggins, Michael Franks, Patti Austin, Dave Koz, Kenny Rankin, Faith Hill, David Lanz, Cece Winans, David Pack, David Sanborn, The Walt Disney Company and Brian McKnight. He paid homage to one of his chief influences, Leonard Bernstein, by playing, arranging, and performing on The Songs of West Side Story, an all-star project produced by David Pack which achieved gold sales status. Benoit contributed to the Rippingtons's debut album, Moonlighting, which was named the most influential contemporary jazz album of all time by Jazziz magazine.

The Benoit/Freeman Project album was given 4 1/2 stars by AllMusic, the highest rating Benoit has received from the service, and the album made it to number 2 on the Top Contemporary Jazz Albums chart from Billboard.

Benoit's music can be heard during The Weather Channel's "Local on the 8s" segments. His version of "Cast Your Fate to the Wind" by Vince Guaraldi is included on the album The Weather Channel Presents: Smooth Jazz II (2008). In May 2011, Benoit began hosting a morning program at jazz radio station KKJZ in Long Beach, California.

Benoit has performed at the White House for three U.S. Presidents: Bill Clinton, Ronald Reagan, and George Bush Sr. Other dignitaries he performed for include Colin Powell, Hillary Clinton, Al Gore, former Los Angeles mayors Tom Bradley and James Hahn, as well as Senator Dick Durbin.

== Awards and honors ==
- 1989: Every Step of the Way, Grammy nomination for Best Contemporary Jazz Performance
- 1996: GRP All-Star Big Band, Grammy nomination for Best Large Jazz Ensemble Performance
- 2000: "Dad's Room" from Professional Dreamer, Grammy nomination for Best Instrumental Composition
- 2001: "Here's to You, Charlie Brown: 50 Great Years!", Grammy nomination for Best Engineered Album, Non-classical

== Discography ==
=== Albums ===
==== As leader/co-leader ====
Year	Title	Label	Notes
1977	Heavier Than Yesterday	AVI; Bluemoon	
1980	Can You Imagine	AVI; Bluemoon	
1982	Stages	AVI; Bluemoon	
1983	Digits	AVI; Bluemoon	
1983	Christmastime	AVI; Bluemoon	
1984	Waves of Raves	AVI; Bluemoon	Compilation of AVI material
1985	This Side Up	Spindletop; En Pointe	
1986	Summer (AKA Some Other Sunset and If I Could Reach Rainbows)	Electric Bird; Intersound; Sin-Drome	Re-recordings of early material
1987	Freedom at Midnight	GRP	
1988	Every Step of the Way	GRP	
1989	Urban Daydreams	GRP	
1989	Waiting for Spring	GRP	
1990	Inner Motion	GRP	
1991	Shadows	GRP	
1992	Letter to Evan	GRP	
1994	Lost And Found	Rhino	Compilation of AVI material
1994	Shaken Not Stirred	GRP	
1994	The Benoit/Freeman Project	GRP	with Russ Freeman
1995	The Stars Fell on Henrietta	Varèse Sarabande	soundtrack
1996	Remembering Christmas	GRP	
1997	American Landscape	GRP	
1999	Professional Dreamer	GRP	
2000	Great Composers of Jazz	Vertical Jazz/Fine Tune	with Brian Bromberg and Gregg Bissonette
2000	Here's to You, Charlie Brown: 50 Great Years!	GRP	
2002	Fuzzy Logic	GRP	
2003	Right Here, Right Now	GRP/Verve	
2004	The Benoit/Freeman Project 2	Concord/Peak	with Russ Freeman
2005	Orchestral Stories	Concord/Peak	
2005	40 Years: A Charlie Brown Christmas	Concord/Peak	
2006	Full Circle	Concord/Peak	
2006	Standards	Kind of Blue	Reissue of Great Composers of Jazz
2008	Heroes	Concord/Peak	
2008	Jazz for Peanuts	Concord/Peak	
2010	Earthglow	Concord/Heads Up	
2012	Conversation	Concord/Heads Up	
2015	2 in Love	Concord	with Jane Monheit
2015	Believe (David Benoit Trio)	Concord	with Jane Monheit and the All American Boys Chorus
2017	The Steinway Sessions	Steinway & Sons	
2017	So Nice	Shanachie	with Marc Antoine
2019	David Benoit and Friends	Shanachie	
2020	It's a David Benoit Christmas!	Steinway & Sons	
2021	Old Friends	Cafe Pacific	with Mark Winkler
2022	A Midnight Rendezvous	Shanachie	
2024	Timeless	SoNo Recording Group	
2025	Steinway After Dark	Steinway & Sons	

==== As a member ====
The Rippingtons

- Moonlighting (Passport Jazz · GRP, 1986)
- Live in L.A. (GRP, 1992)

==== As sideman ====
- 1976 Alphonse Mouzon, The Man Incognito (Blue Note)
- 1977 Doug Richardson, Night Talk (AVI)
- 1987 Full Swing, In Full Swing (Cypress)
- 1988 Patti Austin, The Real Me (Qwest)
- 1988 Sam Riney, Lay It on the Line (River Estates)
- 1990 Emily Remler, This Is Me (Justice)
- 1991 Patti Austin, Carry On (GRP)
- 1992 Kilauea, Tropical Pleasures (Brainchild)
- 1997 Lorraine Feather, The Body Remembers (Bean Bag Entertainment)
- 1999 Dave Koz, The Dance (Capitol)
- 2004 Brian Bromberg, Choices (A440 Music Group)
- 2013 David Pack, David Pack's Napa Crossroads (Concord)
- 2015 Christophe Beck, The Peanuts Movie (Epic)

=== Charted albums ===
Year	Album	Peak chart positions									Label
Year	Album	US 200	US Top Sales	US Jazz	US Con. Jazz	US R&B /HH	US Trad Jazz	US Top Cur	US Ind	US Holi	Label
1986	This Side Up	—	—	—	—	—	4	—	—	—	Spindletop/En Pointe
1987	Freedom at Midnight	—	—	—	5	—	—	—	—	—	GRP
1988	Every Step of the Way	129	—	—	4	—	—	129	—	—	GRP
1989	Urban Daydreams	101	—	—	4	—	—	101	—	—	GRP
1989	Waiting for Spring	187	—	—	—	—	1	187	—	—	GRP
1990	Inner Motion	161	—	—	3	—	—	161	—	—	GRP
1991	Shadows	—	—	—	2	—	—	—	—	—	GRP
1993	Letter to Evan	—	—	50	—	—	3	—	—	—	GRP
1994	The Benoit/Freeman Project (The Benoit/Freeman Project)	118	118	2	2	73	—	118	—	—	GRP
1994	Shaken Not Stirred	—	—	19	14	—	—	—	—	—	GRP
1995	The Best of David Benoit 1987–1995	—	—	25	19	—	—	—	—	—	GRP
1996	Remembering Christmas	—	—	27	15	—	—	—	—	—	GRP
1997	American Landscape	—	—	9	7	—	—	—	—	—	GRP
1999	Professional Dreamer	—	—	11	8	—	—	—	—	—	GRP
2000	Here's to You, Charlie Brown: 50 Great Years!	—	—	5	—	—	2	—	—	—	GRP
2002	Fuzzy Logic	—	—	9	6	—	—	—	—	—	GRP
2003	Right Here, Right Now	—	—	18	10	—	—	—	—	—	GRP
2004	The Benoit/Freeman Project 2 (The Benoit/Freeman Project)	—	—	11	7	—	—	—	48	—	Peak
2005	Orchestral Stories	—	—	48	—	—	—	—	—	—	Peak
2006	Full Circle	—	—	17	7	—	—	—	—	—	Peak
2008	Heroes	—	—	17	9	—	—	—	—	—	Peak
2008	Jazz for Peanuts	—	—	25	—	—	14	—	—	—	Peak
2010	Earthglow	—	—	8	4	—	—	—	—	—	Peak
2012	Conversation	—	—	9	2	—	—	—	—	—	Heads Up
2015	2 in Love (David Benoit featuring Jane Monheit)	—	—	6	—	—	5	—	—	—	Concord
2015	Believe (The David Benoit Trio featuring Jane Monheit and the All-American Boys Chorus)	—	—	23	—	—	15	—	—	—	Concord
2017	The Steinway Sessions	—	—	—	13	—	—	—	—	—	Steinway
2017	So Nice! (David Benoit and Marc Antoine)	—	—	4	2	—	—	—	—	—	Shanachie
2017	20th Anniversary Christmas (Dave Koz and Friends)	—	—	3	1	—	—	64	—	6	Concord
2019	David Benoit and Friends	—	—	3	2	—	—	—	—	—	Shanachie
2022	Christmas Ballads (Dave Koz and Friends)	—	—	—	7	—	—	—	—	—	Just Koz
"—" denotes a recording that did not chart.

=== Charted singles ===
Year	Title	Peak chart positions		Album
Year	Title	Adult Cont.	Smooth Jazz Airplay	Album
1988	"The Key to You"	40	—N/a	Every Step of the Way
2005	"Pick Up the Pieces" (Kenny G featuring David Benoit)	—	24	Kenny G – At Last...The Duets Album
2006	"Beat Street"	—	5	Full Circle
2007	"Water to Drink (Água de Beber)"	—	28	Full Circle
2008	"Human Nature"	—	18	Heroes
2010	"Will's Chill"	—	6	Earthglow
2011	"Botswana Bossa Nova"	—	1	Earthglow
2012	"Feelin' It"	—	1	Conversation
2012	"You're Amazing"	—	4	Conversation
2015	"Too in Love" (David Benoit featuring Jane Monheit)	—	7	2 in Love
2017	"Caminando" (David Benoit and Marc Antoine)	—	1	So Nice
2018	"French Cafe" (David Benoit and Marc Antoine)	—	26	So Nice
2019	"Dave G" (David Benoit featuring Vincent Ingala)	—	3	David Benoit and Friends
2020	"Feel It Still"	—	11	David Benoit and Friends
2022	"A Midnight Rendezvous"	—	13	A Midnight Rendezvous
2024	"Savannah Dream (Sophie's Song)"	—	3	Timeless
2026	"Boarding Pass" (David Benoit & Jeff Lorber)	—	1	TBA
"—" denotes a recording that did not chart.
