= Bruce Dukov =

- Origin: New York City, U.S.
- Occupations: Violinist, concertmaster
- Website: https://www.brucedukov.com/

Bruce Dukov is an American violinist and concertmaster, who has played violin for various films and musicians since the 1980s, having performed in over 1,900 productions as of 2023.

Films that Dukov has performed violin on include the majority of the Star Wars franchise, Titanic, Rosewood, 2012, The Lion King, Sabrina, Batman Forever, Aladdin, Amistad, 16 Illumination films including the Despicable Me franchise, and among various others. Notable artists and musicians he has worked with include Michael Jackson, Frank Sinatra, Stevie Wonder, and Sisqó. He performed the violin sections on Sisqó's 2000 hit song "Thong Song".

== Biography ==
=== Early life & career ===
Dukov was born in New York City to a musical family; His father was a violinist, while his mother was an accordionist and pianist who taught music at their home studio. They performed as a duo at various venues in places such as the Borscht Belt in Upstate New York and in other parts of the country. He and his sister were raised in Kew Gardens Hills, Queens. As a child, he went to school at the Henry Street Settlement.

Dukov, in his adolescence, initially attended the High School of Music & Art in Manhattan. He was later accepted and educated at the Juilliard School, later earning his Bachelors and Masters of Music from the institution and graduating with the school's highest award for the violin. He studied with Dorothy DeLay and Szymon Goldberg, and had as his mentor Nathan Milstein. He also coached with Itzhak Perlman and Yehudi Menuhin. He would later play with Perlman for his rendition of Happy Birthday to Milstein on his 80th birthday; Dukov would later perform another rendition of Happy Birthday to Henri Temianka on his 80th birthday.

He received a Fulbright Scholarship to study in the United Kingdom, and later moved to London to pursue his musical career. He would later perform throughout Europe and the Middle East, including performing for various television stations, as well as the Concertgebouw. He also taught courses at the Royal Irish Academy of Music and the Dublin Philharmonic Society. While there, he worked as a freelance violinist and recorded with composers such as Jerry Goldsmith, Michel Legrand, and Bill Conti.

=== Work in film & music in Los Angeles ===
Dukov moved to Los Angeles in 1985 and began working with Hollywood productions and with musicians. His first performance while in Los Angeles was for Bruce Broughton's soundtrack for Silverado. As of 2023, he has performed in over 1,900 productions. These productions have included various scores composed by John Williams, including much of the Star Wars franchise, Rosewood, Sabrina, and Amistad. He also has performed scores for NBC News and the Olympics. He has also worked with other composers, such as Danny Elfman, Randy Newman, Michael Kamen, Hans Zimmer, James Newton Howard, Henry Jackman, Brian Tyler, and Heitor Pereira.

With regards to musicians, he has performed with names such as Michael Jackson, Frank Sinatra, Stevie Wonder, and Sisqó. He performed the violin sections on Sisqó's 2000 hit song "Thong Song".

He has been the concertmaster for the Hollywood Bowl Orchestra since 1991, of which he also played as the feature soloist. Some of his notable works with the orchestra includes a rendition of Franz Waxman's Carmen Fantasie, as well as performances of works by Miklos Rozsa and Ennio Morricone.

In addition to his work with film and musical scores, he also teaches and provides courses on learning the violin and mastering technique.
