= Larry Rosen (producer) =

- Born: May 25, 1940; The Bronx, New York, U.S.
- Died: October 9, 2015 (aged 75) Park Ridge, New Jersey, U.S.
- Genres: Jazz
- Occupations: Musician; Producer

Larry Rosen (May 25, 1940 – October 9, 2015) was an American entrepreneur, producer, musician, and recording engineer.

== Life ==
Rosen was born in The Bronx, New York, and was raised in Dumont, New Jersey. He began his musical career as a drummer with the Newport Youth Band, meeting eventual partner Dave Grusin while working with singer Andy Williams and attending the Manhattan School of Music. In 1972, Grusin and Rosen produced vocalist Jon Lucien for RCA Records; Grusin/Rosen Productions would evolve from freelance production team to performer-centric jazz label over the next few years, discovering- and developing homegrown talent like Patti Austin, Lee Ritenour, Earl Klugh, and Noel Pointer along the way.

In 1978, Grusin/Rosen Productions signed a long-term development deal with Arista Records president Clive Davis. It was a prolific collaboration, with albums from Dave Valentin, Angela Bofill, Bernard Wright, and Tom Browne—whose hit single "Funkin' For Jamaica" reached number one on Billboard's R&B and Jazz charts—forming the basis of a breakout catalog.

Arista/GRP outperformed commercial expectations and redefined the boutique American jazz label. Rosen used the opportunity to advance the state of the art, engineering and co-producing the Dave Grusin album Mountain Dance— the first digitally recorded non-classical album—in 1979.

Their obligations to Davis fulfilled, Grusin and Rosen established GRP Records, Inc., in 1982 as the Arista contract expired. Under their dual proprietorship, Rosen's personal enthusiasm for digital recording was translated into a corporate mission. Their pioneering "all digital" approach—releasing their entire catalog on Compact Disc—helped launch the format in the United States.

GRP Records was recognized as Billboard magazine's #1 Contemporary Jazz label for five consecutive years while its artists were nominated for over 80 Grammy Awards, winning 33. GRP's artist roster grew to include many notable artists including Chick Corea, Lee Ritenour, Diana Krall, Patti Austin, Dr. John, Diane Schuur, Dave Grusin, Gary Burton, B.B. King, Arturo Sandoval, Michael Brecker, Randy Brecker, and Kevin Eubanks. By 1990, Rosen and Grusin sold GRP Records to the Universal Music Group with Rosen remaining as President & CEO of the label. As part of the larger merged company, Rosen launched the CD reissue series drawing on the Impulse!, Chess, and American Decca back catalog, and helped shape Universal's international business development. GRP was recognized on October 17, 1992, by Billboard magazine with an extensive feature commemorating its 10th anniversary.

After leaving GRP in 1995, Rosen co-founded one of the first Internet e-commerce and content companies, N2K, Inc. (NASDAQ) in 1997. Serving as its chairman and CEO, Rosen led the company to an IPO offering. In addition to its online music store, Music Boulevard, N2K produced a number of genre-based community sites (Rocktropolis, Jazz Central Station, Classical Insites) and artist sites for Leonard Bernstein, Miles Davis, David Bowie, and The Rolling Stones. N2K was also a digital music distribution pioneer, offering the first digital downloads in late 1996 including music by Richard Barone and others. At the height of the Internet boom in 1999, Rosen formed the plan to merge N2K Inc. with one of its main rivals, CDNow Inc., and appeared on the cover of Forbes magazine in July 1998. In 1998, Rosen received Ernst and Young's Entrepreneur of the Year Award in New Media and Entertainment.

Rosen was the chairman of Larry Rosen Productions, where he created and produced the PBS television HD series Legends of Jazz with pianist Ramsey Lewis. Additionally, he is the creator and producer of the seven part television series titled Recording: The History of Recorded Music, with hosts Quincy Jones and Phil Ramone.

In 2008, Rosen created "Jazz Roots - A Larry Rosen Jazz Series," a concert and educational program created for performing arts centers. Jazz Roots found its first home at the Adrienne Arsht Center in Miami, Florida and opened in Dallas, Texas (AT&T Performing Arts Center) as well as the Carmel, Indiana Performing Arts Center in 2010. Artists included Dave Brubeck, Sonny Rollins, Chick Corea, Paquito D’Rivera, John McLaughlin, Ramsey Lewis, Arturo Sandoval, Eliane Elias, Buddy Guy, Dr. John, Manhattan Transfer, Al Jarreau, Jon Hendricks, Eddie Palmieri and Michel Camilo. As a companion to the series, Rosen hosted the locally presented NPR radio series Jazz Roots.

Rosen was married to Hazel Ruben from 1965 to 2015.

Rosen died at his home in Park Ridge, New Jersey, at the age of 75 on October 9, 2015.
