= 75 (album) =

2008 live album by Joe Zawinul

Live album by Joe Zawinul and The Zawinul Syndicate
- Released: 24 September 2008
- Recorded: 7 July 2007 and 2 August 2007
- Venue: Lugano, Switzerland (July), Veszprém, Hungary (August)
- Genre: Jazz
- Length: 1:33:50
- Label: BHM, JVC
- Producer: Joachim Becker

Joe Zawinul chronology
Brown Street (2006)	75 (2008)	Absolute Zawinul (2010)

75 is a live album by Austrian jazz musician Joe Zawinul and his band the Zawinul Syndicate. It was recorded in 2007 at two performances in Switzerland and Hungary, among bandleader Joe Zawinul's final performances. The album was produced by Joachim Becker and originally released in 2008 by JVC Compact Discs, with the Zawinul Estate and Becker serving as executive producers. It was later released by BHM Productions and Heads Up International, the BHM release with the alternate title 75th. It peaked at number eighteen on Billboard's Top Jazz Albums chart and won the 2010 Grammy Award for Best Contemporary Jazz Album. The album received a generally positive critical reception.

== Overview ==
With the exception of one track, 75 was recorded during the Zawinul Syndicate's 7 July 2007 appearance at a festival in Lugano, Switzerland, which happened to be bandleader Joe Zawinul's seventy-fifth birthday. The concert was a part of the Zawinul Syndicate's twentieth anniversary world tour. The remaining track, "In a Silent Way", was recorded from their 2 August 2007 show in Veszprém, Hungary. Zawinul was joined on stage by Wayne Shorter on soprano saxophone for this track. This marked a reunion for Zawinul and Shorter, two founding members of Weather Report, both of whom played on the original version of this song from Miles Davis's 1969 album of the same name. Shortly after these performances, on 11 September 2007, Zawinul died of Merkel cell carcinoma. The Veszprém concert was Zawinul's penultimate performance.

== Composition ==
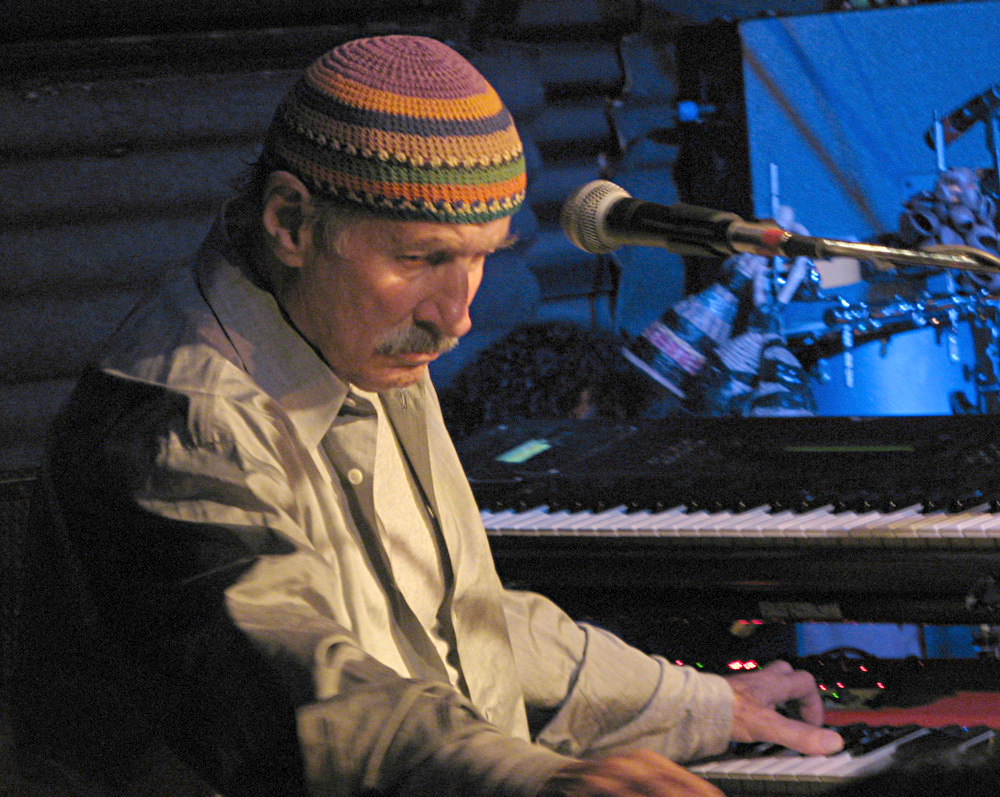
Joe Zawinul (pictured in 2007) died shortly after 75 was recorded.

75 opens with "Orient Express" from Zawinul's 1992 solo album My People. Zawinul plays the vocoder on this track. The second track, "Madagascar", also features Zawinul on vocoder and is one of two tracks that originally appeared on Weather Report's album Night Passage. Another Weather Report piece, "Scarlet Woman", follows and features a bass solo by Linley Marthe. "Zansa II" is a duet with Paco Sery on kalimba and Zawinul on synthesizer and vocoder. The first disc concludes with "Cafe Andalusia". Sabine Kabongo provides scat vocals on this track.

A combination of two Weather Report pieces "Fast City" and "Two Lines" opens disc two and features more scat singing by Kabongo. Next, "Clario" features vocals by Alegre Corrêa. Another melding of Weather Report tunes, "Badia" and "Boogie Woogie Waltz", follows and features Corrêa on Berimbau and Kabongo on vocals. The next track is a recording of Kabongo leading the audience in a chorus of "Happy Birthday" directed at Zawinul. "In a Silent Way", a duet between Shorter and Zawinul originally from Miles Davis's album of the same name, follows. The album closed with "Hymn", which seemed to one reviewer "as though [Zawinul] knew the end was near".

== Critical reception ==
Professional ratings
75
Review scores
Source	Rating
Allmusic	4/5 stars
The Guardian	4/5 stars
The Times	4/5 stars

75 received a generally positive critical reception. Michael G. Nastos of Allmusic wrote that the album exemplified Zawinul's "personalized direction" before he died and that it "exudes all of the energy the group produced in concert". JazzTimes's Bill Milkowski described Zawinul's keyboard playing as creating "dazzling, free-flowing lines with the right hand while deftly orchestrating dense chords and Ellingtonian shout choruses with the left hand". All About Jazz's Woodrow Wilkins called the album a "musical adventure" and Zawinul's performance "a testament to his talent and dedication in sharing his gift". John Kelman, managing editor for All About Jazz, wrote that based on his performance Zawinul gave "no indicators that he was ill, let alone approaching death". He closed his review by calling 75 a "fitting finale to the career of an artist whose creativity, forward thinking and extensive discography mean that he may be gone, but he'll never be forgotten." In the Pittsburgh Tribune-Review, Bob Karlovitis called the release "a great statement about [Zawinul's] creativity". He described the album's opening piece, "Orient Express" as "almost tiring in its energy".

The BBC's Jon Lusk did not share the high opinions of other critics. He was "not mad about" vocalists Aziz Sahmaoui and Sabine Kabongo but found Alegre Corrêa "agreeable enough". He liked "In a Silent Way", calling it "beautifully serene" but wished there were other performances with similar "reflective moments". The review in The Times by John Bungey was more positive. He noted that it was not a "generally sad affair, hard-to-take document" as are most final recordings of great artists, but instead "a compelling last testament of a mighty group and a fine human being". Nick Coleman's review in The Independent was mixed; he wrote that the "tempos border on the frantic, phrases are spat, the will to trade licks is never less than testosteronal" but quipped that for "every sublime passage there's a butch one". John Fordham of The Guardian contrasted the release to Zawinul's 2005 live album Vienna Nights. One difference he emphasized was "the typhoon drumming of Paco Sery and a battalion of percussionists [that] gives Zawinul the option of letting long stretches of the music simply groove". He also noted that there was no comparable track with the duet with Shorter on Vienna Nights.

== Track listing ==
All tracks are written by Joe Zawinul, except where noted.

Disc One
No.	Title	Writer(s)	Originally from	Length
1.	"Introduction to Orient Express"		My People	3:10
2.	"Orient Express"		My People	10:07
3.	"Madagascar"		Night Passage	10:00
4.	"Scarlet Woman"	Alphonso Johnson; Wayne Shorter; Zawinul	Mysterious Traveller	6:55
5.	"Zansa II"	Paco Sery; Zawinul	World Tour	6:39
6.	"Cafe Andalusia"		Faces & Places	8:52

Disc Two
No.	Title	Writer(s)	Originally from	Length
1.	"Fast City" / "Two Lines"		Night Passage / Procession	12:37
2.	"Clario"	Alegre Corrêa		5:45
3.	"Badia" / "Boogie Woogie Waltz"		Tale Spinnin' / Sweetnighter	10:16
4.	"Happy Birthday"	Mildred J. Hill; Patty Hill		1:39
5.	"In a Silent Way"		In a Silent Way	14:20
6.	"Hymn"	Traditional		3:30
Total length:				1:33:50

== Personnel ==
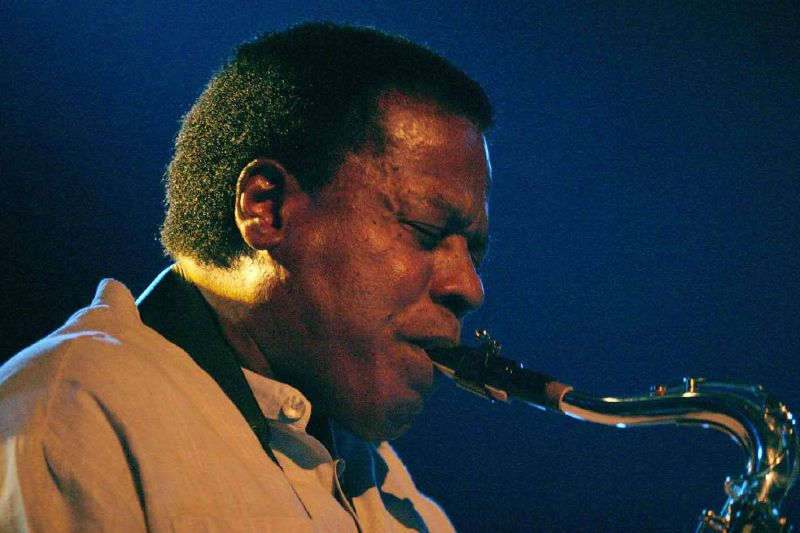
Wayne Shorter joined Joe Zawinul for a duet on "In a Silent Way".

Credits are adapted from the CD liner notes.

Musicians

- Joe Zawinul – keyboards, vocoder
- Alegre Corrêa – guitar, berimbau, vocals
- Linley Marthe – bass
- Paco Sery – drums, kalimba, vocals
- Abdelaziz Sahmaoui – percussion, vocals
- Jorge Bezerra – percussion, vocals
- Sabine Kabongo – percussion, vocals
- Wayne Shorter – soprano saxophone on "In a Silent Way"

Production

- Joachim Becker – executive producer, producer, mixing
- Klaus Genuit – mixing
- Marko Schneider – mastering
- Holger Keifel – portraits
- Knut Schötteldreier – cover design
- Jens Kramer – background photography
- Matjaz Vrecko – other photos

== Charts ==
75 reached a peak position of number eighteen on Billboard's Top Jazz Albums chart.

Year	Chart	Peak position
2009	Billboard's Top Jazz Albums	18

== Awards ==
The album won the 2010 Grammy Award for Best Contemporary Jazz Album. The other nominees for the award were Urbanus by Stefon Harris, Sounding Point by Julian Lage, At World's Edge by Philippe Saisse, and Big Neighborhood by Mike Stern.

== Release history ==
Date	Type	Title	Label	Catalog #
24 September 2008	CD	75	JVC Compact Discs	61575/6
24 October 2008	CD	75th	BHM Productions	4002-2
24 February 2009	CD	75	Heads Up Records	3162-25
