= Big Neighborhood =

2009 studio album by Mike Stern

Studio album by Mike Stern
- Released: August 11, 2009
- Studio: Avatar Studios, Skyline Studios and B & C Studios (New York City, New York); Church House Studios (Austin, Texas); Sage & Sound (Hollywood, California); Silvermine Studios (Norwalk, Connecticut); Carriage House Studios (Stamford, Connecticut)
- Genre: Jazz, jazz fusion
- Length: 68:49
- Label: Heads Up International
- Producer: Jim Beard

Mike Stern chronology
Who Let the Cats Out? (2006)	Big Neighborhood (2009)	All Over the Place (2012)

Big Neighborhood is the fourteenth solo studio album by jazz guitarist Mike Stern. The 2009 release was produced by Jim Beard and released by Heads Up International. It debuted at number five on the Billboard Top Traditional Jazz Albums chart and was nominated for the 2010 Grammy Award for Best Contemporary Jazz Album.

== Overview ==
Music is like a big neighborhood - a place where anything and everything can happen. You can find all kinds of things in a big neighborhood - all kinds of different people, all kinds of different ideas and perspectives, and of course, all kinds of different sounds.

—Mike Stern, on the album's title

Big Neighborhood was Stern's second release on Heads Up, a follow-up to 2006's Who Let the Cats Out? Most of the album was recorded in New York City, but Stern also traveled with a rhythm section to Austin, Texas to record with guitarist Eric Johnson, and then to Los Angeles to record with guitarist Steve Vai and drummer Dave Weckl. Vai played guitar on the title track and sitar on "Moroccan Roll".

The album was nominated for the 2010 Grammy Award for Best Contemporary Jazz Album but lost to the Joe Zawinul album 75. This was Stern's sixth nomination in this category. The other nominees were Urbanus by Stefon Harris, Sounding Point by Julian Lage, and At World's Edge by Philippe Saisse.

== Critical reception ==
Professional ratings
Big Neighborhood
Review scores
Source	Rating
Allmusic	3.5/5 stars

Jonathan Widran of Allmusic commented on the diversity of styles on "Big Neighborhoor", writing that it "range[s] from blazing jazz fusion to African-tinged exotica and trippy Middle Eastern journeys." He called the release "one block party jazz fusion fans won't want to miss in 2009!"

Bill Meredith quipped in the JazzTimes that the album "simply lacks the unbridled improvisation and interplay of his stage shows" and that "[t]he guests are also so numerous that things feel contrived". He closed his review by opining that "with better sequencing and a solid band ... [it] might not seem so all over the place."

In his review for The Virginian-Pilot, Eric Feber wrote that "It’s a beautiful day in jazz guitarist Mike Stern's Big Neighborhood" and closed with "[n]o matter the genre or collaborator, Stern holds his own with lightning-fast, sinewy riffs and impressionistic guitar filigrees."

== Tracks ==
All tracks composed by Mike Stern.

1. "Big Neighborhood" - 7:40
2. "6th Street" - 7:49
3. "Reach" - 5:30
4. "Song for Pepper" - 5:43
5. "Coupe de Ville" - 4:36
6. "Bird Blue" - 5:44
7. "Moroccan Roll" - 7:06
8. "Long Time Gone" - 7:52
9. "Check One" - 7:39
10. "That's All It Is" - 4:52
11. "Hope You Don't Mind" - 5:18

== Personnel ==
- Mike Stern – guitars
- Jim Beard – keyboards (1, 3, 6, 7), acoustic piano (1, 3–7, 11), Hammond organ (2, 4, 8)
- John Medeski – Hammond organ (9, 10), clavinet (9), Wurlitzer electric piano (10), drums (10)
- Steve Vai – guitars (1), sitar (7)
- Eric Johnson – guitars (2, 8)
- Lincoln Goines – bass (1, 2, 7, 8)
- Richard Bona – bass (3), vocals (3)
- Esperanza Spalding – bass (4–6), vocals (4–6)
- Chris Wood – electric bass (9), acoustic bass (10)
- Chris Minh Doky – bass (11)
- Dave Weckl – drums (1, 3, 7)
- Lionel Cordew – drums (2, 8)
- Terri Lyne Carrington – drums (4–6)
- Billy Martin – drums (9)
- Cindy Blackman Santana – drums (11)
- Bob Franceschini – saxophone (3)
- Bob Malach – saxophone (5, 9, 10)
- Randy Brecker – trumpet (11)

=== Production ===
- Dave Love – executive producer
- Jim Beard – producer
- Jon Herrington – production consultant
- Natalie Singer – production coordinator
- Robert Hoffman – art direction, design
- Clay Patrick McBride – photography
- Roy Holland – management
- Bill Milkowski – liner notes

Technical credits

- Greg Calbi – mastering at Sterling Sound (New York, NY)
- Helik Hadar – engineer (1, 7)
- David Boyle – engineer (2, 8)
- Craig Brock – engineer (2, 8)
- Phil Magnotti – engineer (3, 11), mixing
- John Shyloski – engineer (4–6)
- Roy Hendrickson – engineer (9, 10)
- Ken Sluiter – assistant engineer (1, 7)
- Grant Johnson – assistant engineer (2, 8)
- Kurt McMahon – assistant engineer (2, 8)
- Eddie Jackson – assistant engineer (3)
- Amos Halfi – assistant engineer (4–6)
- Charley Hustle – assistant engineer (4–6)
- Justin Gerrish – assistant engineer (9, 10)
- Fernando Lodeiro – assistant engineer (9, 10)
- Ada Rovatti – assistant engineer (11)

== Charts ==
Chart (2009)	Peak position
US Top Jazz Albums (Billboard)	13
Billboard Top Traditional Jazz Albums	5
