= Randy in Brasil =

Studio album by Randy Brecker
- Released: September 9, 2008
- Recorded: November 16–24, 2006
- Studios: The Banda Sonora Studios in São Paulo, Brazil
- Genre: Jazz
- Length: 56:30
- Label: Mama
- Producer: Ruriá Duprat

Randy Brecker chronology
Transatlantic Connection (2006)	Randy in Brasil (2008)	Nostalgic Journey: Tykocin Jazz Suite (2009)

Randy in Brasil is the twelfth solo album by jazz trumpeter Randy Brecker. It was produced and arranged by Ruriá Duprat in November 2006 but not released until September 2008 by Mama Records. The album won the 2009 Grammy Award for Best Contemporary Jazz Album.

== Overview ==
Randy in Brasil was produced and arranged by Ruria Duprat at the popular Banda Sonora Studios in Brasil and features a band of Brazilian musicians. The album took three years to come to fruition and features compositions by Brazilian musicians Djavan, Gilberto Gil, João Bosco, Ivan Lins The only performers to join Brecker on every track are keyboardist Ruria Duprat and guitarist Ricardo Silveira. Gilson Peranzzetta plays on his composition, "Fazendo Hora".

== Conception ==
The idea of recording in Brazil was from a meeting of Brecker with Marco Bosco in Japan. Bosco told him of the record company in Brazil that he was starting with Ruria Duprat, and invited him to record for them. Was supposed to be released in Brazil on Duprat's Rainbow Records, but the label was never fully developed.

== Critical reception ==
Professional ratings
Randy in Brasil
Review scores
Source	Rating
Allmusic	3.5/5 stars

Josef Woodard quipped in JazzTimes that "the presence of slick electronics is laid on too thickly".

== Awards ==
Randy in Brasil was awarded the 2009 Grammy Award for Best Contemporary Jazz Album. The other nominees were Floating Point by John McLaughlin, Cannon Re-Loaded: All-Star Celebration Of Cannonball Adderley produced by Gregg Field and Tom Scott, Miles From India produced by Bob Belden, and Lifecycle by Yellowjackets featuring Mike Stern. Brecker had won four previous Grammys, the last also being Brazilian influenced and in the same category, was Into the Sun in 1998.

== Track listing ==
1. "Pedro Brasil" (Djavan) 4:30
2. "Ilê Ayê" (Gilberto Gil) 4:19
3. "Guaruja" (Randy Brecker) 6:04
4. "Me Leve" (Djavan) 4:23
5. "Malásia" (Djavan) 5:31
6. "Sambop" (Brecker) 5:12
7. "Oriente" (Gil) 3:31
8. "Maçã" (Djavan) 3:50
9. "Olhos Puxados" (João Bosco) 4:27
10. "Rebento" (Gil) 5:15
11. "Fazendo Hora" (Gilson Peranzzetta) 4:21
12. "Aiaiai" (Ivan Lins) 5:03

== Personnel ==
- Randy Brecker – trumpet
- Paulo Calazans – acoustic piano on "Pedro Brasil", "Malásia", and "Maçã", keyboards on "Maçã"
- Teco Cardoso – soprano saxophone on "Pedro Brasil", "Me Leve", "Olhos Puxados", and "Aiaiai", alto saxophone on "Ilê Ayê", "Me Leve", and "Aiaiai", tenor saxophone on "Ilê Ayê", "Sambop", and "Aiaiai", baritone saxophone on "Ilê Ayê" and "Sambop", saxophone on "Guaruja", G-flute on "Malásia", flute on "Maçã"
- Ruriá Duprat – keyboards on "Pedro Brasil", "Ilê Ayê", "Guaruja", "Malásia", "Sambop", "Oriente", "Maçã", "Rebento", "Fazendo Hora", and "Aiaiai", acoustic piano on "Me Leve" and "Olhos Puxados", Fender Rhodes on "Aiaiai", clavinet on "Aiaiai", vocals on "Ilê Ayê"
- Da Lua – percussion on "Pedro Brasil", "Ilê Ayê", "Guaruja", "Fazendo Hora", and "Aiaiai", timba on "Pedro Brasil"
- Sizao Machado – acoustic bass on "Pedro Brasil", "Guaruja", "Me Leve", "Oriente", "Olhos Puxados", and "Rebento", electric bass on "Ilê Ayê", "Maçã", and "Aiaiai"
- André Mehmari – acoustic piano on "Pedro Brasil", "Sambop", and "Oriente"
- João Parahyba – percussion on "Me Leve", "Sambop", "Maçã", "Olhos Puxados", and "Rebento", timba "Sambop", "Maçã", "Olhos Puxados", and "Rebento"
- Gilson Peranzzetta – acoustic piano on "Fazendo Hora"
- Edú Ribeiro – drums on "Aiaiai"
- Robertinho Silva – drums on "Me Leve", "Sambop", and "Maçã"
- Ricardo Silveira – acoustic guitar on "Pedro Brasil", "Guaruja", "Malásia", "Sambop", "Oriente", "Maçã", "Olhos Puxados", "Rebento", and "Fazendo Hora", electric guitar on "Pedro Brasil", "Ilê Ayê", "Me Leve", "Sambop", "Olhos Puxados", and "Aiaiai"
- Caito Marcondes – percussion on "Malásia" and "Oriente"
- Rogério Duprat – acoustic bass on "Fazendo Hora"
- Rubinho Ribeiro – vocals on "Sambop"

=== Production ===
- Ruriá Duprat – arranger, producer

== Release history ==
Year	Type	Label	Catalog #
2008	CD	Mama	1035
2009	CD	BHM Productions	10362
