= Urbanus (album) =

2009 studio album by Stefon Harris

Studio album by Stefon Harris
- Released: August 25, 2009
- Recorded: January 13, 2009 – Jananuary 15, 2009
- Genre: Jazz
- Length: 55:18
- Label: Concord
- Producer: Stefon Harris

Stefon Harris chronology
African Tarantella (2006)	Urbanus (2009)

Urbanus is the seventh album by jazz vibraphonist Stefon Harris. It was released in August 2009 on Concord Records, Harris's first release with the label, his previous six releases were on Blue Note Records. The self-produced album was Harris's second with his band Blackout, the first being 2004's Evolution. It reached number 15 on the Billboard Top Traditional Jazz Albums chart and was nominated for the 2010 Grammy Award for Best Contemporary Jazz Album.

== Overview ==
With Blackout, it really is a band. It's not about me. It's about every member of the ensemble. Everyone contributes songs. Everyone contributes arrangements. It goes wherever the moment goes.

— Stefon Harris

Urbanus, Latin for urban, features Harris's band Blackout, drummer Terreon Gully, keyboardist Marc Cary, saxophonist Casey Benjamin, and bassist Ben Williams. Harris has called this effort a continuation of the work the same band accomplished with its 2004 release, Evolution. The album incorporates jazz with element of hip hop but is closer to pre-1970s jazz and funk than the earlier work by this quintet.

The album was recorded in the days leading up to Barack Obama's inauguration, an event that Harris said filled the band with a sense of pride. Promotion began in May 2009 with a show in Kalamazoo, Michigan at the Dalton Center of Western Michigan University, where Harris completed his residency.

The album was nominated for the 2010 Grammy Award for Best Contemporary Jazz Album but lost to the Joe Zawinul album 75. The other nominees were Sounding Point by Julian Lage, At World's Edge by Philippe Saisse, and Big Neighborhood by Mike Stern.

== Tracks ==
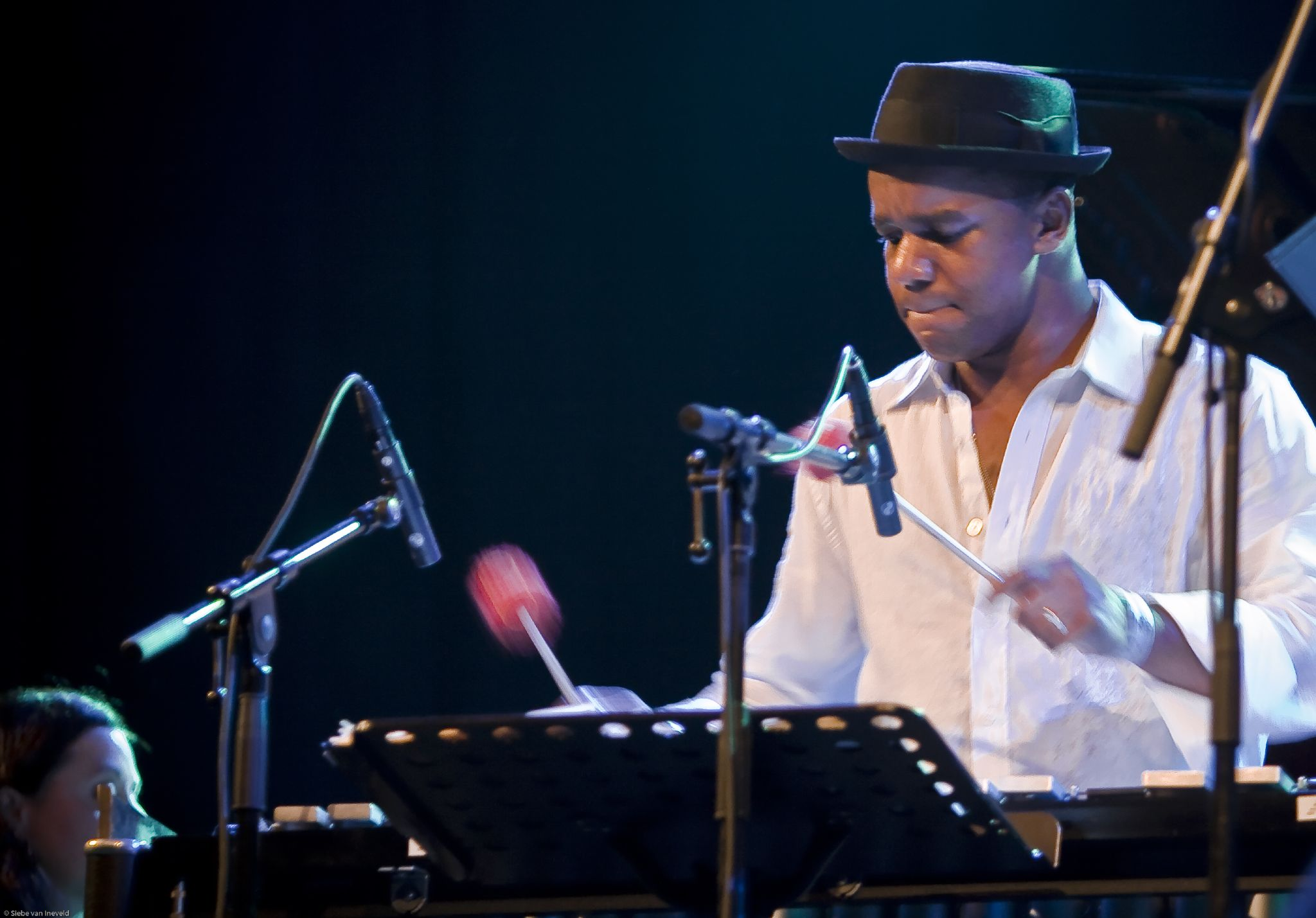
Stefon Harris playing the vibraphone

The opening track, "Gone", composed by Gil Evans, is a modern version of "Gone, Gone, Gone" from the opera Porgy and Bess. It has a go-go feel that Harris attributes to keyboardist Marc Cary and bassist Ben Williams's Washington, D.C. roots. D.C. is said to be the birthplace of the go-go style of funk. Harris plays the marimba on his interpretation of the Buster Williams standard "Christina". Drummer Terreon Gully contributed the track "Tanktified". "Shake It for Me" features a Harris marimba solo and piano solo by Marc Cary.

The reworking of Jackie McLean's "Minor March" is the collection's track most resembling modern bop, even being called hard bop in one review. Casey Benjamin plays the vocoder on the Stevie Wonder cover, "They Won't Go (When I Go)".

"The Afterthought" is a track written by Cary, originally for his 1995 release Cary On, in honor of his grandparents. Benjamin co-wrote "For You" with Sameer Gupta and is again featured on the vocoder. The shortest track on the release, "Blues for Denial", features Cary on acoustic piano. Lastly, "Langston's Lullaby" was named after Harris's son, who in turn was named after poet Langston Hughes.

== Critical reception ==
Professional ratings
Urbanus
Review scores
Source	Rating
Allmusic	3.5/5 stars

Opinions of this release were mixed. John Kelman in All About Jazz called Urbanus "an impressive group effort...with plenty of cross-over potential and all-ages appeal" but Michael G. Nastos of Allmusic quipped that the "music bears mixed results". He went on to decry Benjamin's vocoder as "one of the silliest devices ever conceived" but then did call Benjamin "one of the best young alto saxophonists in modern jazz". He conceded that there is a "majority of excellent music played on this album" but closes unfavorably writing that the band "wants to appeal to exactly what its title suggests, an urban crowd less interested in innovation or expansion as it is the beat."

Andrew Gilbert in his review in The Seattle Times wrote that "not every track...is a ringing success" and that it "sometimes feels overstuffed with ideas". He does however call the musicians "masters of their musical domain" that create "bustling electroacoustic textures".

== Tracks ==
1. "Gone" (George Gershwin, Ira Gershwin, DuBose Heyward, Gil Evans) 6:07
2. "Christina" (Charles A. "Buster" Williams) 6:39
3. "Tanktified" (Terreon Deautri Gully) 7:00
4. "Shake It for Me" (Timothy Reginald Warfield Jr.) 3:00
5. "Minor March" (Jackie McLean) 3:35
6. "They Won't Go When I Go" (Stevie Wonder, Yvonne Lowrene Wright) 7:37
7. "The Afterthought" (Marc Cary) 4:59
8. "For You" (Casey Benjamin, Sameer Gupta) 6:06
9. "Blues for Denial" (Stefon Harris) 2:19
10. "Langston's Lullaby" (Benjamin, Harris) 7:56

== Personnel ==
- Stefon Harris – vibraphone, marimba, producer

=== Blackout ===
- Terreon Gully – drums
- Marc Cary – piano, Fender Rhodes, keyboards
- Casey Benjamin – alto saxophone, vocoder
- Ben Williams – bass

=== Additional musicians ===
- Y.C. Laws – percussion on "Gone"
- Anna Webber – flute on "Gone", "They Won't Go (When I Go)", "For You" and "Langston's Lullaby"
- Anne Drummond – alto flute on "Gone", "They Won't Go (When I Go)", "For You" and "Langston's Lullaby"
- Mark Vinci – clarinet on "Gone", "They Won't Go (When I Go)" and "Langston's Lullaby" and bass clarinet on "For You"
- Sam Ryder – clarinet on "Gone", "They Won't Go (When I Go)" and "Langston's Lullaby"
- Jay Rattman – bass clarinet on "Gone", "They Won't Go (When I Go)", "For You" and "Langston's Lullaby"
- Rigdzin Collins – violin on "For You"

=== Production ===
- Larissa Collins – package design
- Chris Dunn – A&R
- Joe Ferla – Audio engineer, recording assistant
- James Frazee – assistant engineer
- Mark Wilder – mastering

== Charts ==
Date	Chart	Peak
September 26, 2009	Top Traditional Jazz Albums	15
