= Grammy Award for Best Contemporary Jazz Album =

- Awarded for: Quality contemporary jazz performances
- Country: United States
- Presented by: National Academy of Recording Arts and Sciences
- First award: 1992
- Final award: 2011
- Website: grammy.com

The Grammy Award for Best Contemporary Jazz Album was an award presented at the Grammy Awards, a ceremony that was established in 1958 and originally called the Gramophone Awards, to recording artists for works (songs or albums) containing quality contemporary jazz performances. Honors in several categories are presented at the ceremony annually by The Recording Academy to "honor artistic achievement, technical proficiency and overall excellence in the recording industry, without regard to album sales or chart position".

Originally called the Grammy Award for Best Contemporary Jazz Performance, the award was first presented to the Manhattan Transfer in 1992. From 1993 to 1994 the category was known as Best Contemporary Jazz Performance (Instrumental), from 1995 to 2000 the name changed to Best Contemporary Jazz Performance, and since 2001 the name of the category has been Best Contemporary Jazz Album. Until 2001, both albums and singles were eligible for this award. According to the category description guide for the 52nd Grammy Awards, the award is presented for albums containing "at least 51% playing time of newly recorded contemporary jazz instrumental tracks". Beginning in 2001, award recipients included the producers, engineers, and/or mixers associated with the nominated work in addition to the recording artists.

As of 2011, Pat Metheny holds the record for the most wins in this category, with a total of six (five times with the Pat Metheny Group). Randy Brecker has received the award four times total, once along with his brother Michael as the duo known as Brecker Brothers. The group Béla Fleck and the Flecktones has received the award twice. American artists have been presented with the award more than any other nationality, though it has been presented once to Joe Zawinul, born in Austria. The group Yellowjackets holds the record for the most nominations without a win, with a total of seven. In 2012, the award was discontinued in a major overhaul of Grammy categories. From 2012, contemporary jazz recordings were shifted to the newly formed Best Jazz Instrumental Album category.

== Recipients ==
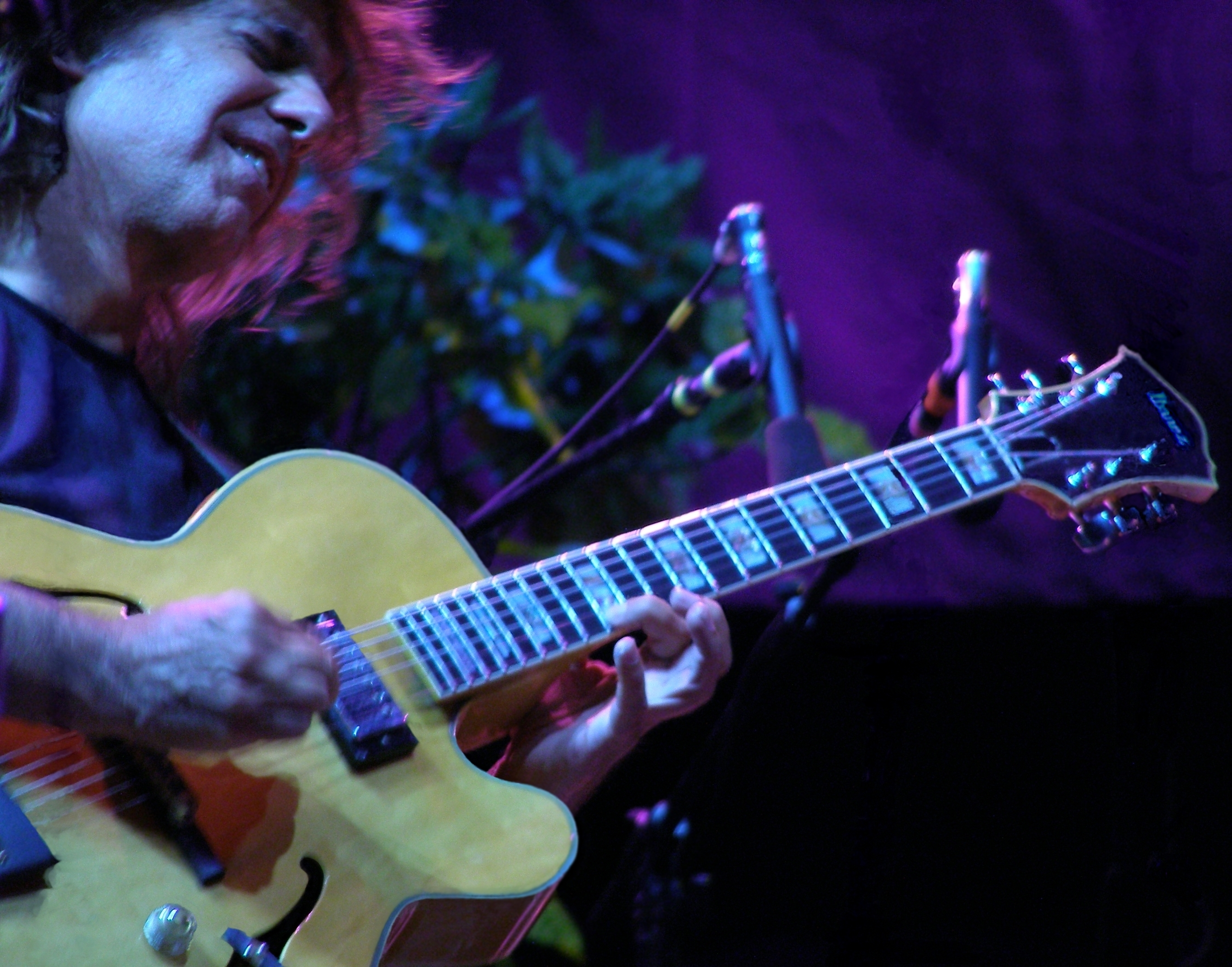
Six-time award winner Pat Metheny

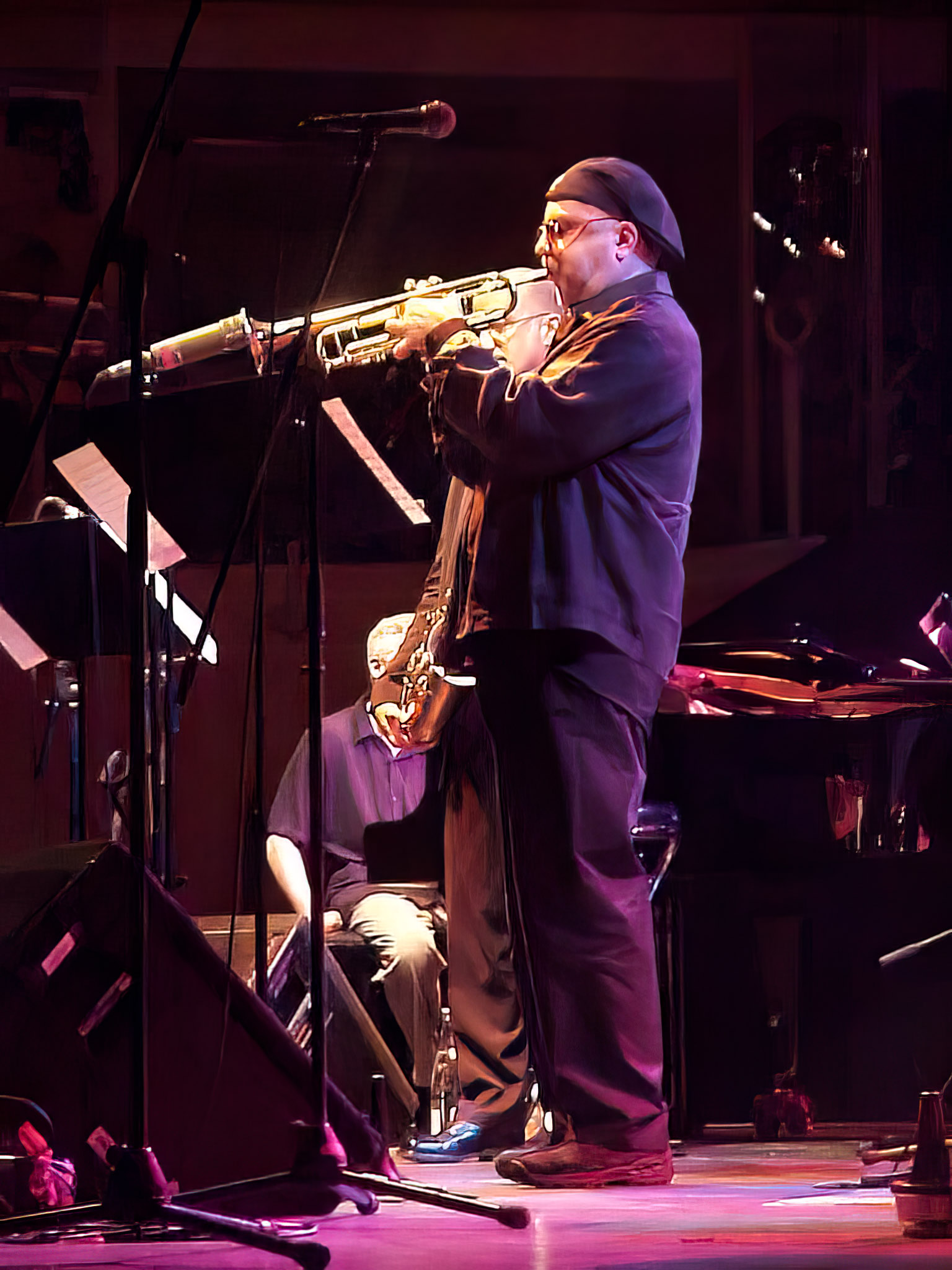
Four-time award winner and member of Brecker Brothers, Randy Brecker

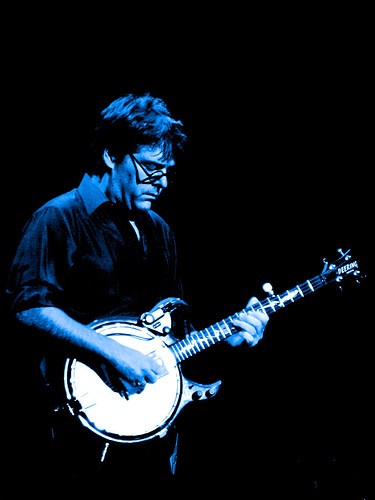
Béla Fleck of the two-time award-winning group, Béla Fleck and the Flecktones

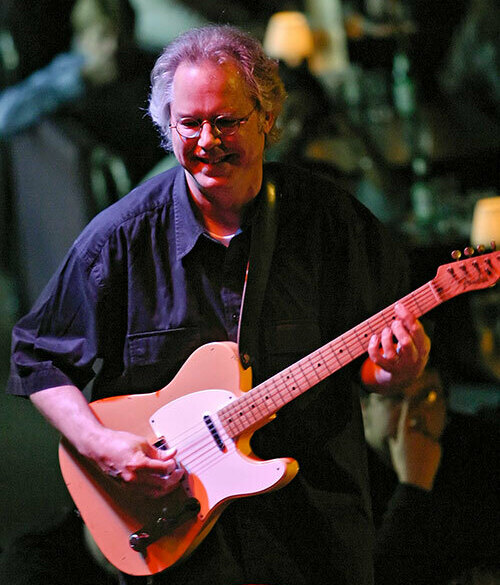
2005 award winner, Bill Frisell

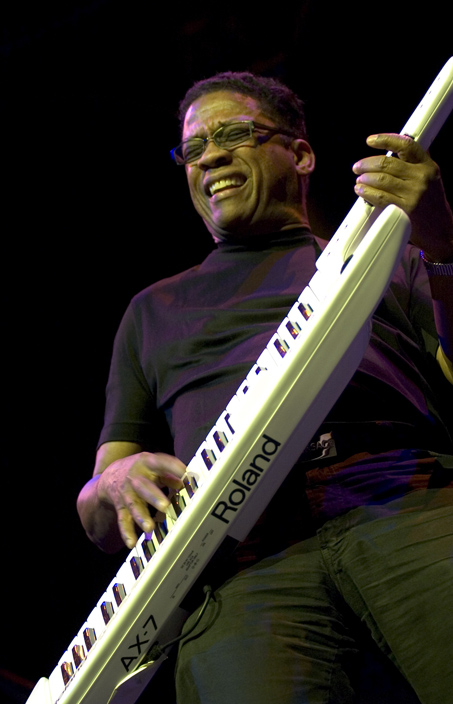
2008 award winner, Herbie Hancock

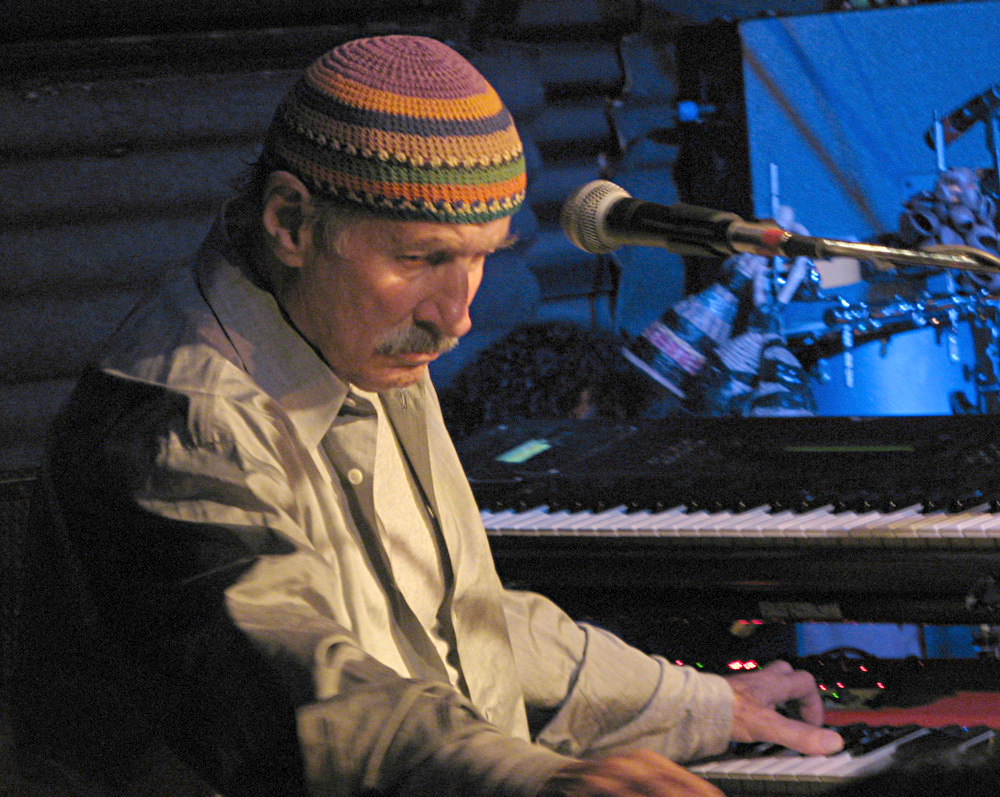
2010 award winner, Joe Zawinul

Year^{[I]}	Performing artist(s)	Work	Nominees	Ref.
1992	The Manhattan Transfer	"Sassy"	Béla Fleck and the Flecktones – Flight of the Cosmic Hippo; Bobby McFerrin – Medicine Music; Claus Ogerman and Michael Brecker – Claus Ogerman Featuring Michael Brecker; Joe Sample – Ashes to Ashes; Yellowjackets – Greenhouse	
1993	Pat Metheny	Secret Story	Bob Berg – Back Roads; Brecker Brothers – Return of the Brecker Brothers; Bob Mintzer – One Music; David Sanborn – Upfront	
1994	Pat Metheny Group	The Road to You	Chick Corea Elektric Band II – Paint the World; Fourplay – Between the Sheets; John Patitucci – Another World; Yellowjackets – Like a River	
1995	Brecker Brothers	Out of the Loop	Jan Garbarek Group – Twelve Moons; Marcus Miller – The Sun Don't Lie; Mike Stern – Is What It Is; Yellowjackets – Run for Your Life	
1996	Pat Metheny Group	We Live Here	Fourplay – Elixir; Marcus Miller – Tales; Lee Ritenour and Larry Carlton – Larry & Lee; Yellowjackets – Dreamland	
1997	Wayne Shorter	High Life	Bob James and Kirk Whalum – Joined at the Hip; T.J. Kirk – If Four Was One; Harvey Mason – Ratamacue; Mike Stern – Between the Lines	
1998	Randy Brecker	Into the Sun	Lee Ritenour – Alive in L.A.; Patrice Rushen – Signature; Joe Sample – Sample This; Grover Washington, Jr. – Breath of Heaven: A Holiday Collection	
1999	Pat Metheny Group	Imaginary Day	George Duke – After Hours; Marcus Miller – Live & More; Yellowjackets – Club Nocturne; Joe Zawinul and The Zawinul Syndicate – World Tour	
2000	David Sanborn	Inside	Russell Gunn – Ethnomusicology, Volume 1; Tim Hagans – Animation/Imagination; Bob James – Joy Ride; Victor Wooten – Yin-Yang	
2001	Béla Fleck and the Flecktones	Outbound	Fourplay – Yes, Please!; Tim Hagans and Bob Belden – Re-Animation: Live!; Ronny Jordan – A Brighter Day; Liquid Soul – Here's the Deal	
2002	Marcus Miller	M²	CAB – CAB 2; Bill Evans – Soul Insider; Russell Gunn – Ethnomusicology, Volume 2; Mike Stern – Voices	
2003	Pat Metheny Group	Speaking of Now	Larry Carlton – Deep Into It; John Scofield Band – Überjam; Yellowjackets – Mint Jam; Joe Zawinul – Faces & Places	
2004	Randy Brecker	34th N Lex	Nicholas Payton – Sonic Trance; David Sanborn – Time Again; The Crusaders – Rural Renewal	
2005	Bill Frisell	Unspeakable	Fourplay – Journey; Jan Garbarek – In Praise of Dreams; Don Grusin – The Hang; Roy Hargrove – Strength	
2006	Pat Metheny Group	The Way Up	Dave Douglas – Keystone; Bill Evans – Soulgrass; Joshua Redman Elastic Band – Momentum; Meshell Ndegeocello – The Spirit Music Jamia: Dance of the Infidel	
2007	Béla Fleck and the Flecktones	The Hidden Land	Groove Collective – People People Music Music; Christian Scott – Rewind That; Sex Mob – Sexotica; Mike Stern – Who Let the Cats Out?	
2008	Herbie Hancock	River: The Joni Letters	Will Bernard – Party Hats; Brian Bromberg – Downright Upright; Eldar – Re-Imagination; Jeff Lorber – He Had a Hat	
2009	Randy Brecker	Randy in Brasil	John McLaughlin – Floating Point; Yellowjackets and Mike Stern – Lifecycle; Various artists – Cannon Re-Loaded: All-Star Celebration of Cannonball Adderley; Various artists – Miles from India	
2010	Joe Zawinul and The Zawinul Syndicate	75	Stefon Harris and Blackout – Urbanus; Julian Lage – Sounding Point; Philippe Saisse – At World's Edge; Mike Stern – Big Neighborhood	
2011	The Stanley Clarke Band	The Stanley Clarke Band	Joey DeFrancesco – Never Can Say Goodbye; Jeff Lorber Fusion – Now Is the Time; John McLaughlin – To the One; Trombone Shorty – Backatown	

^{^[I]} Each year is linked to the article about the Grammy Awards held that year.
