= Aziz Sahmaoui =

Moroccan musician (born 1962)

Aziz Sahmaoui عزيز السحماوي
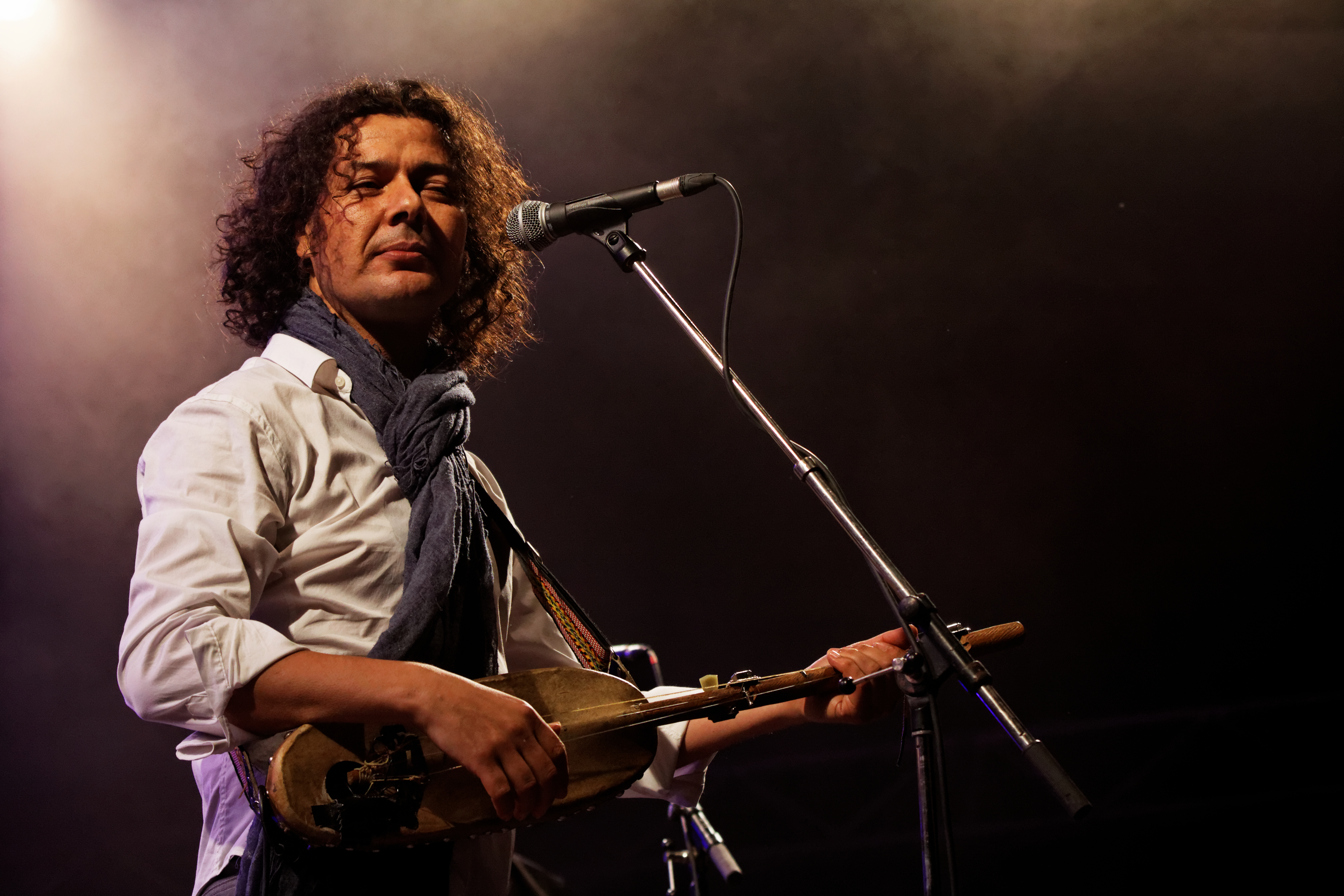
- Sahmaoui performing with University of Gnawa in 2012

Background information
- Born: 1962 (age 63–64); Marrakesh, Morocco
- Genres: Gnawa; world music
- Occupation: Musician
- Instruments: Sintir; oud; guitar
- Years active: 1995–present

Aziz Sahmaoui (in Arabic: عزيز السحماوي) (born 1962) is a Moroccan musician who specializes in a modern version of Gnawa music.

== Life and career ==
Aziz Sahmaoui was born in 1962 in Marrakesh, Morocco. He listened to Gnawa music from a young age, influenced by his father. After finishing his studies, in the 1990s, he moved to Paris, where he co-founded l'Orchestre National de Barbès (ONB), which mixed reggae and raï with North African influences.

After releasing two albums with ONB, he joined the Austrian jazz keyboardist and composer Joe Zawinul and collaborated with him on a number of songs as well as joining his Zawinul Syndicate. In 2010, Sahmaoui founded his own band, University of Gnawa, which boasted an international membership and blended a variety of genres, including jazz fusion, raï, chaabi, and traditional West African music.

== Selected discography ==
with the Zawinul Syndicate

- 75 (2008)

with University of Gnawa

- Aziz Sahmaoui & University of Gnawa (2011)
- Mazal (2014)
- Poetic Trance (2019)
- Best of University of Gnawa (2020)

Other albums

- Il fera beau demain matin jusqu'à midi with Eric Longsworth and Adhil Mirghani (2023)
