= Splitting Adam =

Canadian contemporary rock band

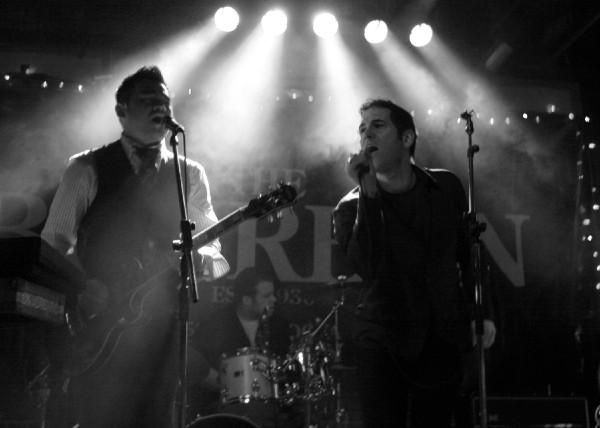
- Left to Right: Thompson, Jordan, Seren

Background information
- Origin: Vancouver, British Columbia, Canada
- Genres: Adult contemporary, alternative rock
- Years active: 1996–2010
- Members: Seren – lead vocals (1996-2010); Thompson – guitar / keys / vocals (2005-2010); Antonio – guitar (1996-2010); Rob – bass (1996-2010); Jordan – drums (2005-2010)
- Past members: Gaspar – drums (1996-2004)
- Website: splittingadam.com

Splitting Adam was a Canadian contemporary rock band from Vancouver consisting of five band members: Seren (lead vocals), Thompson (guitar / keyboards / vocals), Antonio (guitar), Rob (bass), and Jordan (drums).

In 2000, Splitting Adam licensed two songs to NBC for use in the television series Just Deal.

After solidifying their line-up in 2005, the band licensed their single ("On My Own" on YouTube) to Electronic Arts' Need for Speed: Undercover (NFSU). In 2008, before the official release of the game, the band performed with the Vancouver Symphony Orchestra as part of Video Games Live (VGL), featuring never-before-seen footage from NFSU. In 2009, they toured with VGL, making appearances alongside various major symphonies including the Calgary Philharmonic, Winnipeg Symphony, Los Angeles Philharmonic, and San Diego Symphony Orchestras.

The song Vertical Drop can be found in the file list of Need For Speed- ProStreet, but was not featured in the final game.

See Canadian Videogame Awards "performance" on YouTube, Vancouver, British Columbia (May 5, 2010).

Following their VGL tour, the band formed a brief partnership with Rethink Communications in creating their new album cover. Under the direction of former Art Director Jeff Harrison, the album was nominated for a Grammy award in the category "Best Recording Package" on YouTube. Splitting Adam remains one of the few independent bands to have earned a Grammy nomination.

The band made their last appearance as an ensemble in April 2010, outside Rogers Arena.

The name Splitting Adam arises from the topic of human creation - the theory of evolution ("splitting" the atom) combined with a literal biblical interpretation ("Adam" and Eve).

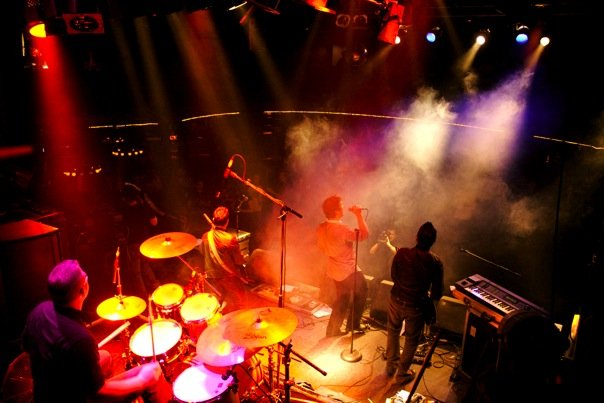
Richard's on Richards (February 27th, 2009)

== Awards and nominations ==
- Grammy Nomination

Best Recording Package "Splitting Adam" - Jeff Harrison, Art Director View Animation

- Lotus Award (Gold Medal)

Design: Best Packaging "Splitting Adam CD Packaging" - Rethink Communications

- G.A.N.G. Nomination

Best Original Vocal: Pop "On My Own" – Need For Speed: Undercover

== Discography ==
"On My Own" (Splitting Adam - 2008)

- 1998 Clouded Lens
- 2000 Vertical Drop (EP)
- 2003 Distractions
- 2008 3 Steps Forward (EP) (Produced by Jeff Dawson)
- 2009 Splitting Adam (Produced by Joe Cruz and Jeff Dawson)

== See also ==
- List of bands from Canada
