= Sounding Point =

2009 studio album by Julian Lage

Studio album by Julian Lage
- Released: March 24, 2009
- Recorded: May 11 & June 15–16, 2008
- Studio: Legacy Studios, New York City
- Genre: Jazz
- Length: 56:20
- Label: EmArcy
- Producer: Steven Epstein

Julian Lage chronology
Sounding Point (2009)	Gladwell (2011)

Sounding Point is the debut studio album by the then 21-year-old jazz guitarist Julian Lage. It was released in March 2009 by EmArcy Records. It entered the Billboard Top Contemporary Jazz Albums chart at number 13 and was nominated for the 2010 Grammy Award for Best Contemporary Jazz Album. Reviews of the album were generally positive, though one reviewer found the recording inferior to Lage's live performances.

== Overview ==
Lage wrote on his album,

"It started with an idea, but it wasn't until I shared with some of the other musicians that it became something. We started having these dialogues about what would the Julian Lage record be. We would talk about it all the time. What kind of songs it would have and what would it say ... I didn't want it to be virtuosic; I wanted there to be a more storytelling in this. I constantly thought about how I could represent the common theme in all these songs."

Sounding Point was recorded when Lage was 20 years old. He plays an acoustic Martin D-18GE and an electric Linda Manzer archtop on the record.

It was nominated for the 2010 Grammy Award for Best Contemporary Jazz Album but lost to the Joe Zawinul album 75. The other nominees were Urbanus by Stefon Harris, At World's Edge by Philippe Saisse, and Big Neighborhood by Mike Stern.

== Various ensembles ==
Lage performs two solo tracks on the release; the remainder of the album consists of pieces played by three separate combos. There are two duets, "Tour One" and "All Blues", with pianist Taylor Eigsti and three all-string bluegrass inspired numbers, "The Informant", "Long Day, Short Night", and "Alameda", with Chris Thile on mandolin and Béla Fleck on banjo. The remaining six tracks are played by some combination of Lage's touring band: saxophonist Ben Roseth, cellist Aristides Rivas, bassist Jorge Roeder, and percussionist Tupac Mantilla. There is no drums kit on the recording; Mantilla plays cajón, djembe, frame drums, and cymbals.

== Selected tracks ==
The album's opening track, "Clarity", was written by Lage when he was 15 years old for Gary Burton's 2005 album Next Generation. It was rewritten for this release to feature the cello playing of Aristides Rivas. "All Purpose Beginning" is about writing a letter to a friend; it begins with the sound of a pencil writing on paper. The album's closing track, "All Blues", is a cover of the Miles Davis composition. There are two other covers: Elliott Smith's "Alameda" and Neal Hefti's "Lil' Darlin'", a piece made famous by Count Basie.

== Critical reception ==
Professional ratings
Review scores
Source	Rating
AllMusic	3.5/5 stars
The Guardian	3/5 stars

David Wiegand, in his review for the San Francisco Chronicle, wrote that Lage "demonstrates a jaw-dropping stylistic range and thrilling technique" on this "exquisite" album. For The Washington Post, Geoffrey Himes called Lage "a jazz newcomer more interested in elegance than in flash, more interested in instrumental storytelling than in virtuosity".

The Chicago Tribune's Howard Reich found the album to be inferior to Lage's live performances. He wrote, "The power of this music proved significantly greater in concert than on the recording", and "What often sounds static and predictable on disc becomes dramatically more vibrant and detailed in concert". John Fordham quips in The Guardian that a "downside of the music is a sometimes becalmed over-refinement".

In Patrick Ferrucci's New Haven Register review, he called the release "a cohesive and entertaining jazz journey". All About Jazz's managing editor wrote, "a fully-formed voice that transcends yet incorporates his multifaceted stylistic interests, Lage's impressive debut points to a giant in the making". AllMusic's Michael G. Nastos called the album "as impressive a debut recording as you'll hear" and labeled Lage "a legitimate rising star".

== Track listing ==
All tracks are written by Julian Lage except where noted.

No.	Title	Writer(s)	Length
1.	"Clarity"		5:54
2.	"All Purpose Beginning"		7:16
3.	"Familiar Posture"		2:58
4.	"The Informant"	Lage; Béla Fleck; Chris Thile	3:23
5.	"Peterborough"		0:46
6.	"Long Day, Short Night"	Lage; Fleck; Thile	5:47
7.	"Quiet, Through and Through"		2:18
8.	"Lil' Darlin'"	Neal Hefti	5:20
9.	"Tour One"	Lage; Taylor Eigsti	4:27
10.	"Alameda"	Elliott Smith	2:19
11.	"Constructive Rest"		2:38
12.	"Motor Minder"		6:00
13.	"All Blues"	Miles Davis	7:14
Total length:			56:20

== Personnel ==
- Julian Lage – guitar
- Béla Fleck – banjo (4, 6, 10)
- Chris Thile – mandolin (4, 6, 10)
- Ben Roseth – saxophone (1, 2, 5, 7, 12)
- Taylor Eigsti – piano (9, 13)
- Aristides Rivas – cello (1, 2)
- Jorge Roeder – bass (1, 2, 7, 8, 12)
- Tupac Mantilla – hand percussion (1, 2, 8, 12)

== Charts ==
Date	Chart	Peak
April 11, 2009	Top Contemporary Jazz Albums	13
