= Anita O'Day: The Life of a Jazz Singer =

2007 American film by Ian McCrudden

- Directed by: Robbie Cavolina; Ian McCrudden
- Produced by: Robbie Cavolina; Ian McCrudden; Melissa Davis
- Starring: Amy Albany; Buddy Bregman; Charles Britton; David Boska
- Cinematography: Ian McCrudden
- Edited by: Robbie Cavolina
- Release dates: April 30, 2007 (Tribeca Film Festival); August 15, 2008 (United States)
- Running time: 93 minutes
- Country: United States
- Language: English

Anita O'Day: The Life of a Jazz Singer is a 2007 American documentary film about the jazz singer Anita O'Day. The documentary, directed and produced by Robbie Cavolina and Ian McCrudden, premiered at the Tribeca Film Festival in 2007 and had a limited release on August 15, 2008. It was nominated for Best Long Form Music Video at the 52nd Grammy Awards.

== Reception ==
The film has received positive reviews. It has a 100% rating on Rotten Tomatoes, with the critical consensus stating "This rich documentary chronicles the highs and lows of one of the medium's finest singers, utilizing remarkable archive footage and insightful interviews with O'Day herself."
