= At World's Edge =

Studio album by Philippe Saisse
- Released: March 10, 2009
- Recorded: January–May 2008
- Genre: Jazz
- Length: 50:12
- Label: Koch
- Producer: Philippe Saisse, Roy Hendrickson

Philippe Saisse chronology
Body and Soul Sessions (2006)	At World's Edge (2009)

At World's Edge is the ninth album by jazz keyboardist Philippe Saisse. The 2009 release was Saisse's first on Koch Records. It was produced by Saisse and Roy Hendrickson and was nominated for the 2010 Grammy Award for Best Contemporary Jazz Album.

== Overview ==
Hearing the news that At World's Edge was nominated elated me beyond words. I felt particularly grateful for the validation of the incomparable contributions all the musicians, singers and engineers made to the record. I just wish my father would have lived long enough to share this special honor with me.

—Philippe Saisse when asked about his reaction to receiving the Grammy nomination.

Philippe Saisse dedicated At World's Edge to his late father Maurice Saisse. This album has African and Latin influences.

The album was nominated for the 2010 Grammy Award for Best Contemporary Jazz Album but lost to the Joe Zawinul album 75. This was Saisse's first Grammy nomination. The other nominees were Urbanus by Stefon Harris, Sounding Point by Julian Lage, and Big Neighborhood by Mike Stern.

== Recording ==
Work on the album began in Saisse's Scarsdale, New York basement studio, but he had to relocate to Los Angeles after a flood destroyed the studio. The album's core musicians, drummer Simon Phillips, bassist Pino Palladino, and guitarist Jeff Golub, recorded with Saisse in Los Angeles, but not all of the album was recorded on site. The guest musicians recorded their parts where ever they were, then sent them to Saisse who produced the pieces together. The work was then sent to Tokyo where engineer Goh Hotoda completed the mixing.

== Selected tracks ==
Saisse's mid-recording forced cross-country move was the inspiration for much of the album. "Billy's Blues", which features Jason Golley on both trumpet and flugelhorn, was inspired by Saisse's friend Bill Howell. Saisse stayed with Howell prior to his move west, the location of Howell's home was the inspiration for the track "Topanga Moon Dance". The album opens with "From Nowhere to Now Here", the piece tells the story of his journey west. The track "Assante Sana" exemplifies Saisse's world view of music. This Latin flavored piece feature the vocals of Angélique Kidjo from Benin, Africa.

== Critical reception ==
Professional ratings
At World's Edge
Review scores
Source	Rating
Allmusic	4/5 stars

Jonathan Widran of Allmusic called At World's Edge "one of the most exciting and explosive contemporary jazz sets of 2009". Randall Parrish called the album "a highly entertaining and engaging work" and closed his review with "[o]nly a true accomplished master such as Philippe Saisse could nimbly pull this expression of contemporary jazz together so marvelously."

== Track listing ==
1. "From Nowhere to Now Here (Intro)" (Philippe Saisse) 1:16
2. "From Nowhere to Now Here" (Saisse) 4:11
3. "The Rover" (Saisse) 3:59
4. "Billy's Blues" (Saisse) 4:21
5. "At World's Edge" (Saisse) 4:12
6. "Monday Afternoon" (Saisse) 5:31
7. "Assante Sana" (Angélique Kidjo, Saisse) 3:45
8. "Roppongi Blues" (Saisse) 6:29
9. "Through Tainted Glass" (Saisse) 3:41
10. "Topanga Moon Dance" (Saisse) 6:25
11. "Junto" (Saisse) 2:40
12. "At World's Edge" [Vocal Version] (David Rice, Saisse) 4:12

== Personnel ==
- Philippe Saisse – keyboards, piano, producer
- Simon Phillips – drums, Audio engineer, mixing
- Pino Palladino – bass
- Jeff Golub – guitar, engineer

=== Guest musicians ===
- Jeff Beal – flugelhorn, trumpet, engineer
- Michael Davis – trombone
- Marc Antoine – acoustic guitar
- Kirk Whalum – tenor saxophone, engineer
- Lenny Castro – percussion
- Angélique Kidjo – vocals
- Annas Allaf – guitar, oud, engineer
- Jason C. Golley – trumpet, flugelhorn
- David Finck – acoustic bass, engineer, audio production
- Jasmine Roy – vocals
- Scooter Warner – drums, engineer

=== Production ===
- Roy Hendrickson – producer, engineer
- Goh Hotoda – engineer, mixing, audio production
- Ramon Hervey II – executive producer
- Francois Boutault – engineer
- Javier García – engineer
- Ronald Jenkins – engineer
- Daniel Meron – engineer
- Doug Schwartz – mastering
- Andy Snitzer – engineer
- Jake Wherry – engineer
- Christian "Wicked" Wicht – engineer
- Erik Zobler – engineer
- Alice Butts – art direction, design
- Sunny Bak – photography
