= Faces & Places =

2002 studio album by Joe Zawinul

Studio album with 3 live recordings by Joe Zawinul
- Released: August 2002
- Recorded: autumn 2000 – March 2002
- Genre: Jazz
- Label: ESC Records
- Producers: Paco Sery, Ivan Zawinul, Joe Zawinul

Joe Zawinul chronology
Mauthausen - Vom großen Sterben hören (2000)	Faces & Places (2002)	Midnight Jam (2004)

Professional ratings
Review scores
Source	Rating
Allmusic	2.5/5 stars
The Penguin Guide to Jazz Recordings	4/4 stars

Faces & Places is a jazz album by Joe Zawinul, released in 2002 on ESC Records. This album was nominated to Grammy Award for Best Contemporary Jazz Album.

== Track listing ==
1. "The Search" (Zawinul)
2. "All About Simon" (Zawinul, Mbappe)
3. "Introduction to Tower of Silence" (Zawinul, Chatterjee) – live rec. autumn 2000
4. "Tower of Silence" (Zawinul)
5. "The Spirit of Julian "C" Adderley" (Zawinul)
6. "Familiar to Me" (Zawinul, Lang, Page)
7. "Café Andalusia" (A Day in Tunisia)
8. "Good Day" (Zawinul)
9. "Barefoot Beauty" (Zawinul)
10. "Rooftops of Vienna" (Zawinul)
11. "Borges Buenos Aires, Pt. 1" (Zawinul)
12. "Borges Buenos Aires, Pt. 2" (Zawinul) – live rec. summer 2001
13. "Siseya" (Zawinul, Mbappe) – live rec. summer 2001
14. "East 12th Street Band" (Zawinul)

== Personnel ==
- Joe Zawinul - spoken vocals, keyboards, synthesizer
- Harry Kim - trumpet, flugelhorn
- Bob Malach - tenor saxophone, winds
- Dean Brown - guitar
- Amit Chatterjee - guitar, vocals
- Zakir Hussain - tablas
- Manolo Badrena - percussion
- Alex Acuña - percussion
- Nathaniel Townsley - drums
- Etienne Mbappe - bass
- Richard Bona - bass
- Les Benedict - trombone (erroneously listed as "Lester")
- Richard Page - vocals
- Maria João - vocals
- Lori Perry - vocals
