= Paco Sery =

Ivorian world music/jazz fusion drummer

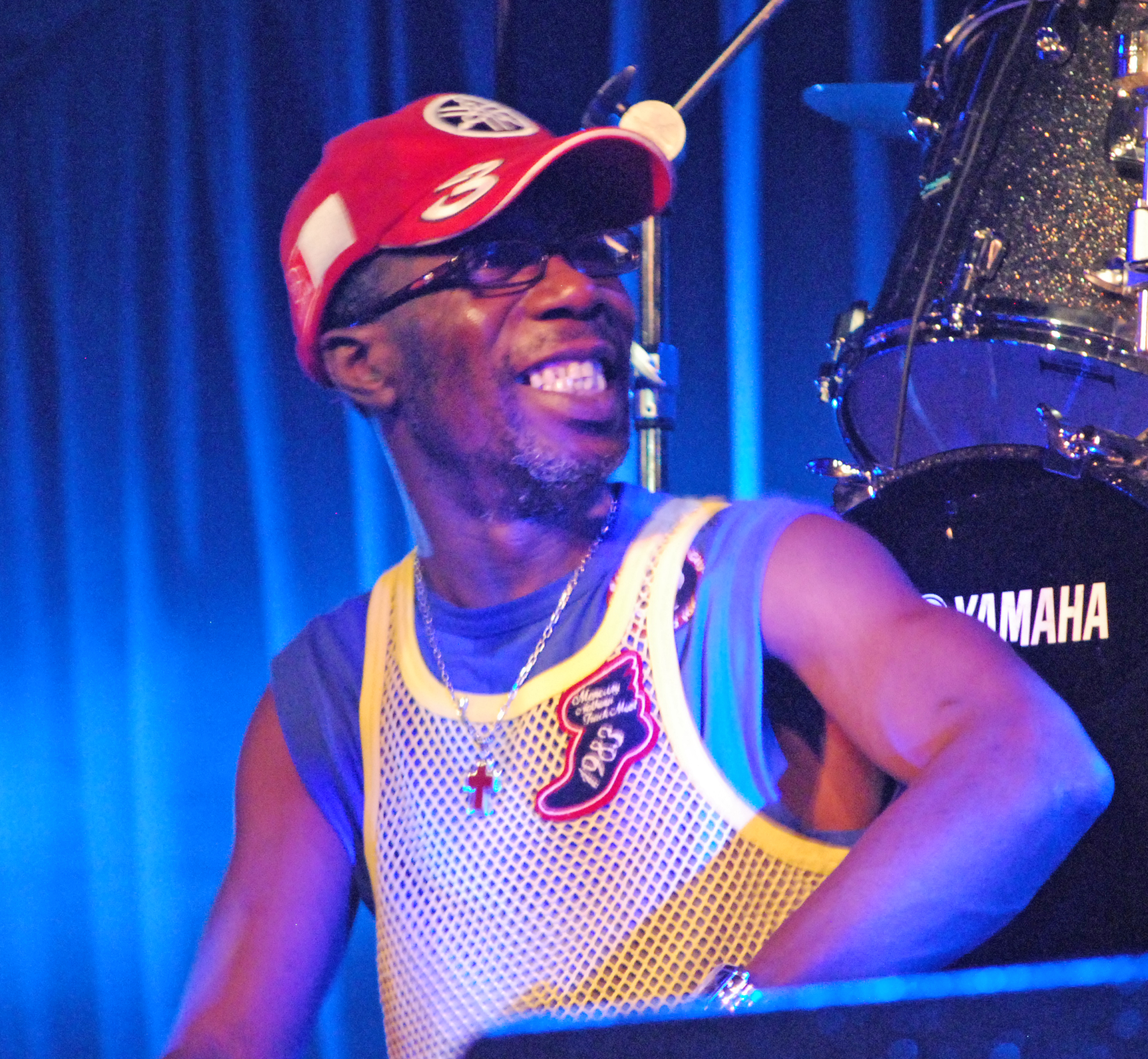
- Sery in 2002

Background information
- Born: Paco Sery; May 1, 1956; Divo, Côte d'Ivoire
- Genres: Jazz, fusion, jazz-funk, jazz-rap, world music
- Occupations: Bandleader, composer, drummer
- Instruments: Drums, Percussions
- Years active: 1976 - Present

Paco Sery (born 1 May 1956 in Côte d'Ivoire) is a world music and jazz fusion drummer. He has played with Joe Zawinul and Eddy Louiss. He also has his own band, and released his first solo album, Voyages, in 2000.

== Discography ==
=== With Sixun ===
- 2008 Palabre
- 2006 Live à la Cigale
- 1998 Nouvelle Vague
- 1995 Flasback (compilation)
- 1995 Lunatic Taxi
- 1993 No Man’s land
- 1990 L’eau de La
- 1988 Explore
- 1988 Sixun Live
- 1987 Pygmées
- 1985 Nuit blanche
- 1987 Pygmées

=== With Joe Zawinul ===
- 2008 75th
- 2002 Faces and Places
- 1998 World tour
- 1996 My People

=== Other collaborations ===
- 2012 The Syndicate File Under Zawinul
- 2003 Yakar Idrissa Diop
- 2002 Bendera So Kalmery
- 2001 Récit Proche Eddy Louiss
- 2001 Safi Ray Lema
- 2000 Poulina Orchestre National de Barbès
- 1997 The Blessed Rain Ashley Maher
- 1997 Per fortuna Purtroppo Irene Grandi
- 1997 Dife Kassav’
- 1996 Sarada Alma Rosa
- 1995 Emotion Papa Wemba
- 1991 Gaia Ray Lema
- 1991 Amen Salif Keita
- 1987 Afrijazzy Manu Dibango
- 1982 Fodder on My Wings Nina Simone
