= Bill Meredith =

American drummer

- Born: Bill Meredith; 1960 (age 65–66)
- Origin: Lake Worth, Florida, U.S.
- Genres: Pop, rock
- Occupations: Music and sports writer, journalist, musician
- Instruments: Drums, percussion
- Years active: 1980 –

William Stevens Meredith (born 1960) is an American music and sports writer, journalist, drummer, percussionist and singer. He is best known with his extensive work as music writer in music magazines such as Jazziz which is an international Jazz magazine, Maryland-based JazzTimes, JazzBluesFlorida and Palm Beach Post.

Bill Meredith was born in Lake Worth, Florida. He had big interest in both, writing and music. His first official writing assignments were for The Kaleidoscope at now Dreyfoos School of the Arts in West Palm Beach. After the high school, he attended Palm Beach Community College where he also served as editor-in-chief for The Beachcomber. The University of Florida followed. In the 1980s, completing his prime education, Bill started two careers simultaneously, in journalism and music.

In the 1990s, while he was playing with different bands, he wrote for Modern Drummer, allmusic and Free Press magazines. Meredith has played drums with the band Acoustic Remedy since 2002 and the group won Best Local Band Award in The Palm Beaches and Treasure Coast. This event is being organized annually by Cityvoter. Meredith started a still-standing association with the international jazz monthly Jazziz in 2000, working as an assistant editor from 2004 to 2006. He continues to write CD reviews, stories and Q&As for the magazine. In 2001, he was hired for the bi-weekly Local Music column in the Palm Beach Post. Other publications include, Closer and the West Palm Tribune. His recording credits include a release by Andy Stein, Strings of Consciousness

His name was included in the Jazzinstitut Darmstadt's (Germany) bibliographical information.

In 2006, Meredith became a feature story and reviews contributor to Maryland-based jazz magazine JazzTimes and started writing sports for the Palm Beach Post. Other magazine endeavors included the jazz and blues online monthly JazzBluesFlorida and Palm Beach Arts Paper, an online blog and monthly print publication.

Since 2007, Meredith has recorded the CDs Black Finger Forever and Where's My Parade with Black Finger, filmed music videos for the songs "Hold On" and "Sugar."

Bill's recent article, an interview with Billy Cobham, Billy Cobham A&Q was published in Jazziz, winter 2010 issue. He is a member of the Authors Guild in New York. His ex-wife Ginny, a violinist and singer, is the executive director of Inspirit, a South Florida-based nonprofit that takes musicians to perform for people in restricted environments like pediatric wards, hospitals, rehabilitation centers, shelters and retirement homes.

== Meredith as a sideman (Drummer, percussionist) ==
- Big Brass Bed – A Few Dylan Songs (Solstice Records)
- Jason Colannino – Piece of the Sun (JC Records)
- Friction Farm – 34 Degrees, 32 Minutes (Quinn/Stay Records)
- Black Finger – Where's My Parade (Ethyl Records)
- Andy Stein – Strings of Consciousness (S of G Music Group) (See ref#6)
- The Funky Blu Roots – 'Live' (FBR Records)
