= Ian McCrudden =

American film director

Ian McCrudden is an independent film director and writer who lives in Hollywood, California.

Variety praised McCrudden's film Islander for its “deeply felt performances” and “intimate, powerfully atmospheric” style. The Hollywood Reporter called the film "an intelligent and compelling drama". His film Anita O'Day: The Life of a Jazz Singer (which he co-directed) won the Satellite Award for Best Documentary Film by the International Press Academy and was nominated for Best Long Form Music Video at the 52nd Annual Grammy Awards.

Ian studied at Stanford University. His production of Night Baseball was honored at the National College Theater Festival. McCrudden has directed the films Child of Grace (Ted Levine, Maggie Elizabeth Jones), Cowboys & Indians (Ruby Knox), The Things We Carry (Alexis Rhee), Äntligen midsommar (Luke Perry, Lisa Werlinder, Olle Sarri), Islander (Phillip Baker Hall), the documentary Anita O' Day: The Life of a Jazz Singer, Trespassers (Michelle Borth), The Big Day (Julianna Margulies), Mr. Smith Gets a Hustler (Alex Feldman), and Trailer: The Movie. He also directed one-woman show "Patriotic Bitch", written and performed by Alanna Ubach, in New York City. McCrudden has contributed songs for many of his films and his debut album Start Over was released in March 2007, followed by Dream Anyway in 2010.

== Filmography ==
- Child of Grace (2014)
- Cowboys & Indians (2013)
- The Things We Carry (2009)
- Äntligen midsommar (2009)
- Anita O'Day: The Life of a Jazz Singer (2007)
- Islander (2006)
- Trespassers (2006)
- Mr. Smith Gets a Hustler (2003)
- The Big Day (2001)
- Trailer: The Movie (1999)
