= Into the Sun (Randy Brecker album) =

Studio album by Randy Brecker
- Released: July 1996
- Recorded: December 1995
- Genre: Jazz
- Length: 58:49
- Label: Concord Jazz
- Producer: Randy Brecker

Randy Brecker chronology
Out of the Loop (Brecker Brothers album) (1994)	Into the Sun (1996)	Hangin' in the City (2001)

Professional ratings
Review scores
Source	Rating
AllMusic	2/5 stars
The Penguin Guide to Jazz Recordings	3/4 stars

Into the Sun is an album by Randy Brecker, released through Concord Jazz in 1997. In 1998, the album won Brecker the Grammy Award for Best Contemporary Jazz Performance.

== Track listing ==
All songs by Randy Brecker.

1. "Village Dawn" – 6:23
2. "Just Between Us" – 5:48
3. "The Sleaze Factor" – 4:47
4. "Into the Sun" – 6:54
5. "After Love" – 7:27
6. "Gray Area" – 6:42
7. "Tijuca" – 5:18
8. "Buds" – 3:55
9. "Four Worlds" – 7:18
10. "Hottest Man in Town: Prophecy/Growth/Realization/The Horn/Finale" – 4:17

== Personnel ==
- Randy Brecker – trumpet, arranger, composer, flugelhorn, producer, liner notes
- Maucha Adnet – vocals
- Dave Bargeron – trombone
- Bobby Brecker – composer, performer on "The Hottest Man in Town: Part I"
- John Burk – executive producer
- Café – percussion
- Greg Calbi – mixing
- Lee Dick – mixing assistant
- Paul DInnocenzo – photography
- Eliane Elias – sequencing
- Lawrence Feldman – bass flute
- Joe Ferla – engineer, mixing
- Gil Goldstein – accordion, keyboards, producer, orchestration
- Mike Hoaglin – production manager
- Jonathan Joseph – percussion, drums
- Kent Judkins – Art Direction
- Bakithi Kumalo – bass, fretless bass
- Barbara Lipke – mixing assistant
- Mark Mason – mixing assistant
- Bob Mintzer – bass clarinet
- Malcolm Pollack – engineer
- Adam Rogers – acoustic guitar, electric guitar
- David Sanborn – saxophone on "The Sleaze Factor"
- Richard Sussman – synthesizer, programming
- David Taylor – tuba, bass trombone
- Keith Underwood – alto flute, bass flute
