= Philippe Saisse =

French jazz musician (born 1957)

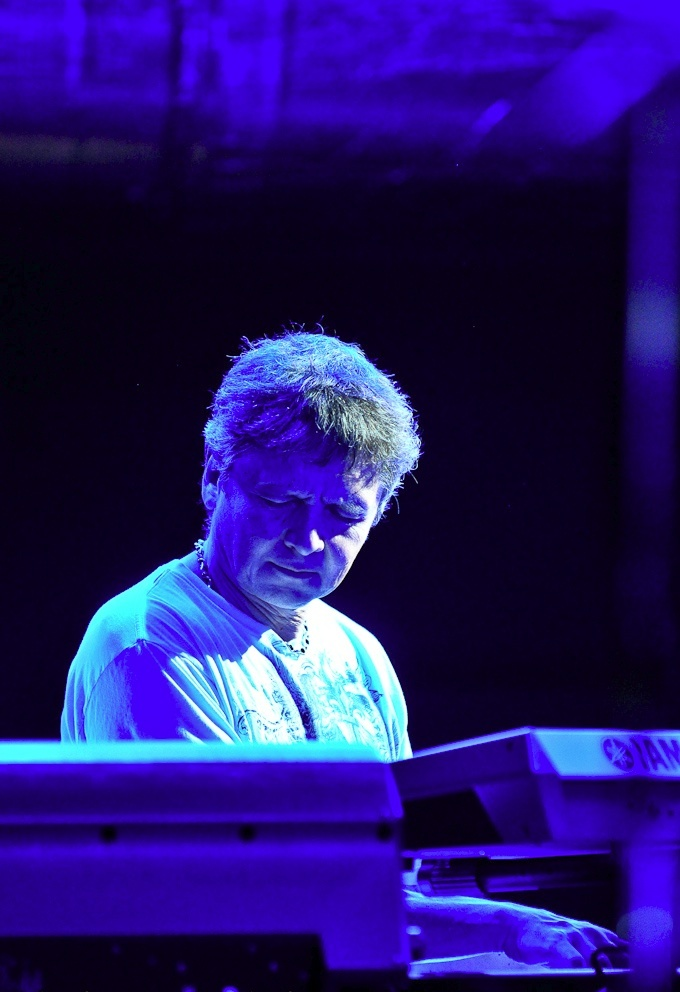
- Saisse as part of the Phillips Saisse Palladino Trio, Rome, 2009

Background information
- Born: 1957 (age 68–69); Marseille, France
- Genres: Smooth jazz, alternative rock, pop, electronica
- Occupation: Musician
- Instrument: Keyboards
- Formerly of: Phillips Saisse Palladino
- Website: philippesaisse.com

Philippe Saisse (French pronunciation: [filip sɛs]; born 1957) is a French jazz musician, composer, record producer, and arranger.

== Career ==
He was born in Marseille and raised in Paris. After studying at the Paris Conservatory he won a scholarship to the Berklee College of Music. He was half of the duo Doppelganger with Randy Fredrix; a video for their song "Communication Breakdown" was added to MTV's playlist in 1985.

He became the protégé of Gary Burton and debuted on Al Di Meola's Splendido Hotel. He also worked with Nile Rodgers and Felicia Collins in the album Outloud and wrote for David Sanborn. He has also worked in the alternative rock, jazz fusion and rock world for David Bowie, Chaka Khan, Al Jarreau, Gato Barbieri, Paul King, and the Rolling Stones.

Between 1988 and 1990 he performed as the regular house band keyboardist in the Sunday Night Band, during the two seasons that the highly acclaimed music performance program Sunday Night ran on NBC late-night television "Night Music" episodes No. 104 (1988), No. 113 (1989), No. 114 (1989), No. 121 (1989).

Saisse's 2008 solo album, At World's Edge, was nominated for a Grammy Award for Best Contemporary Jazz Album. Although it did not reach the commercial success normally expected of an album boasting a cast of highly ranked musicians, it reunited Saisse with two old friends: bassist Pino Palladino, and drummer Simon Phillips. The three performers joined together as an instrumental rock/jazz fusion trio ensemble PSP (Phillips Saisse Palladino). Their debut album, PSP LIVE, on the C.A.R.E Music Group label (of Munich) and the Forest Records label has been supported by a minor tour of Europe from 2009 through February 2010, spotlighting the talents of each performer in the songs chosen for their set list. The trio finished up their tour in Japan at the end of March, 2010, having allowed Palladino time in February to honor his responsibilities as the touring bassist with the Who, at the Super Bowl XLIV half-time show in the United States.

Saisse was a member of Dave Koz & the Kozmos, the house band of The Emeril Lagasse Show.

In 2014, he worked with Japanese drummer Senri Kawaguchi on her second album Buena Vista and in 2016 he worked with her again, composing many tracks for and playing in her album Cider ~ Hard and Sweet, which was released in December, 2016. In 2017, they performed together with Armand Sabal-Lecco at the 2017 Tokyo Jazz festival before touring a number of locations round Japan, including one at Motion Blue in Tokyo which won the Nissan Jazz Japan Award 2017 for Best Live Performance.

== Discography ==
- Valerian (Windham Hill, 1988)
- Storyteller (Philips, 1991)
- Dream Catcher (Georges Mary, 1994)
- Masques (Windham Hill, 1995)
- NeXT Voyage (Windham Hill, 1997)
- Halfway 'Til Dawn (GRP, 1999)
- The Body and Soul Sessions (Rendezvous, 2006)
- At World's Edge (Koch, 2009)
- On the Level (Bander-Log, 2017)
