= Jazz trio =

Group of three jazz musicians

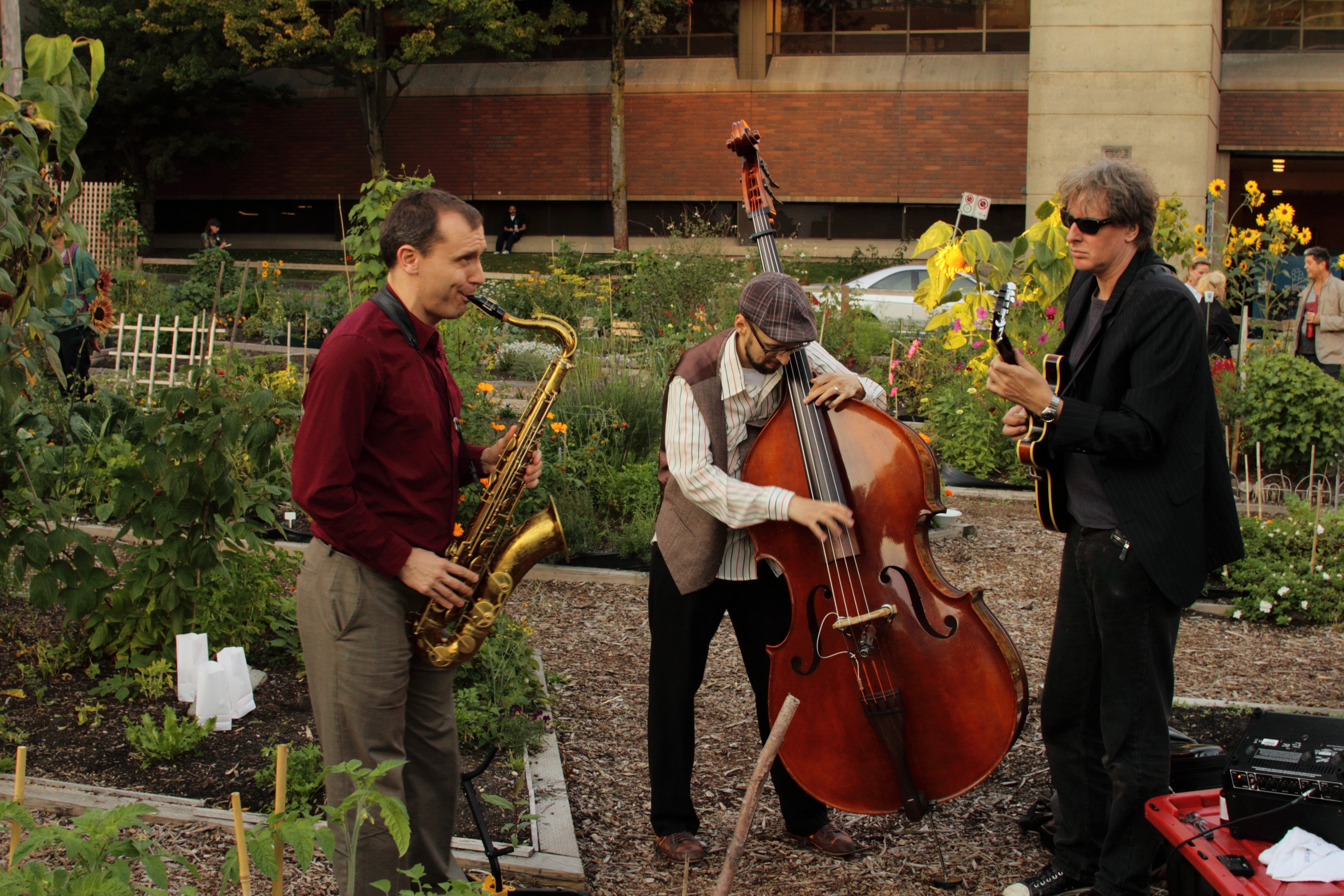
A jazz trio playing in a community garden.

A jazz trio is a group of three jazz musicians, often a piano trio comprising a pianist, a double bass player and a drummer. Jazz trios are commonly named after their leader, such as the Bill Evans Trio.

== Variants and examples ==
Famous examples include the Bill Evans Trio with Scott LaFaro on bass and Paul Motian on drums; and the Vince Guaraldi trio, featuring Fred Marshall and Jerry Granelli.

Nat King Cole formed a piano/guitar/bass trio in 1937. This format was also used by Art Tatum, Lennie Tristano, Ahmad Jamal, Vince Guaraldi, and Oscar Peterson. Tristano, Jamal, Guaraldi, and Peterson all later led trios with the traditional format of piano, bass, and drums.

Another variant is the organ trio, comprising electric organ (typically a Hammond B-3), drums, and usually electric guitar. The bassist is excluded, and the organist instead plays the bassline with their left hand (on a keyboard) or their feet (on the bass pedalboard). Organists Jimmy Smith, Richard "Groove" Holmes and Jack McDuff and guitarists Grant Green and Wes Montgomery are among the musicians who have worked in this format. The original line-up of the Tony Williams Lifetime featured Williams (drums); John McLaughlin (guitar); and Larry Young (organ).

In some instances, such as Bud Powell's trios, the ensemble is simply named after the leader (with the exception in Powell's case of his first recording as a leader, Bud Powell Trio).

Some other jazz trios include:

- Brad Mehldau Trio – Mehldau piano, Larry Grenadier bass and Jeff Ballard drums.
- Keith Jarrett Trio – Jarrett piano, Gary Peacock bass and Jack DeJohnette drums.
- Mark Kramer Trio – Kramer piano, Gary Mazzaroppi/Eddie Gomez bass, and John Mosemann drums.
- The Bad Plus – Orrin Evans (formerly Ethan Iverson) piano, Reid Anderson bass, and Dave King drums.
- Medeski Martin & Wood offers an organ trio variation whereby the guitarist is replaced by a bassist (Chris Wood).
- Marin Wasilewski Trio – Wasilewski piano, Slawomir Kurkiewicz bass, and Michal Miskiewicz drums.

== Less common formats ==
As early as 1935, Benny Goodman recorded in a trio format, featuring himself (clarinet), Teddy Wilson (piano) and Gene Krupa (drums). A similar format was used earlier in 1928 by clarinetist Douglas Williams. The Lester Young Trio of 1946 featured Young on tenor sax, Nat King Cole on piano and Buddy Rich on drums.

In 1948, pianist Herman Blount (later known as Sun Ra) briefly played in a trio with Coleman Hawkins (saxophone) and Stuff Smith (violin), dispensing with a conventional rhythm section. Jimmy Giuffre's 1958 trio also lacked bass or drums, featuring Giuffre (saxophone and clarinet), Jim Hall (guitar) and Bob Brookmeyer on valve trombone. Giuffre's 1961 trio had Paul Bley on piano and Steve Swallow on bass. In 1986, Hall was involved in the Power of Three album; his fellow musicians were Wayne Shorter (saxophones) and Michel Petrucciani (piano). In the 1960s, saxophonist Anthony Braxton led a trio featuring Leroy Jenkins (violin) and Wadada Leo Smith (trumpet).

In 1949, Red Norvo formed a trio consisting of himself on vibraphone, plus guitar and bass; the best-known line-up featured Tal Farlow and a young Charles Mingus.

In 1957, saxophonist Sonny Rollins recorded the album Way Out West with bassist Ray Brown and drummer Shelly Manne. Players who used this piano-less format in the 1960s include Ornette Coleman (with David Izenzon and Charles Moffett); Albert Ayler (with Gary Peacock and Sunny Murray) and Peter Brötzmann (with Peter Kowald and Sven-Ake Johansson).

The free jazz guitarist Derek Bailey played in a number of trios, including Joseph Holbrooke, with drummer Tony Oxley and Gavin Bryars on bass, and Iskra 1903, with Barry Guy (bass) and Paul Rutherford (trombone).

The early-80s group Codona had a line-up of Don Cherry (trumpet) and two percussionists, Collin Walcott and Nana Vasconcelos.

From the 1980s, drummer Paul Motian frequently recorded in a trio with Bill Frisell (guitar) and Joe Lovano (saxophone). Saxophonist and composer John Zorn released recordings in a trio with Frisell and George E. Lewis on trombone.

The 1990s trio Clusone 3 comprised Michael Moore (sax/clarinet), Han Bennink (drums) and Ernst Reijseger (cello). In the same decade, saxophonist John Lurie formed the John Lurie National Orchestra with drummer Grant Calvin Weston and percussionist Billy Martin.

In the 2000s and since, three members of the Association for the Advancement of Creative Musicians (AACM), pianist Muhal Richard Abrams, trombonist George E. Lewis and saxophonist Roscoe Mitchell, have concertized and recorded together.
