= Never Stop II =

2018 studio album by the Bad Plus

Studio album by The Bad Plus
- Released: January 19, 2018
- Recorded: September 2017
- Studio: Brooklyn Recording, NYC
- Genre: Jazz
- Length: 52:09
- Label: Legbreaker Records
- Producer: The Bad Plus

The Bad Plus chronology
It's Hard (2016)	Never Stop II (2018)	Activate Infinity (2019)

Professional ratings
Review scores
Source	Rating
AllMusic	3.5/5 stars
All About Jazz	3/5 stars
Rolling Stone	3.5/5 stars

Never Stop II is the thirteenth studio album by American jazz trio The Bad Plus, released on January 19, 2018 by Legbreaker Records label.

== Background ==
This album is the first album with pianist Orrin Evans who replaced Ethan Iverson. The album contains 10 original compositions written by bandmembers. This is a follow-up album for Never Stop released in 2010.

== Reception ==
In his review for Rolling Stone Hank Shteamer stated, "No one musician stands out; instead, it’s the song that’s the star – a sign that, personnel swap aside, Never Stop II is Bad Plus business as usual." Nate Chinen of NPR wrote, "That title should be one clue as to the band's intentions. Never Stop, released in 2010, was the first album by The Bad Plus to consist entirely of original compositions. That's true again of Never Stop II, which features four songs by Anderson and two apiece by King and Evans. Each album can be understood as a planted flag, a marker of group identity. But the transition at hand is cause for close inspection, a reflection on what's changed and what remains the same."

Samuel Stroup of All About Jazz added, "On the Never Stop II, The Bad Plus show off their brand new pianist Orrin Evans as a player, improviser, and composer. The trio now enters the next chapter of its being, and it seems the addition of Evans will be a step in the right direction for the group... The tunes on Never Stop II are well-written and earnest, showcasing a band listening and improvising with one another, affirming that the group has not yet run out of meaningful music to make." Matt Collar of AllMusic stated " Never Stop II is a focused, atmospheric set of all-original songs. Technically, the album is a follow-up to the band's first album of all-original material, 2010's Never Stop. However, with Evans on board, the album primarily works as a debut for the trio." Howard Reich of Chicago Tribune noted, "Ultimately, Evans and the band’s two veterans seem to be building a new, common language, one influenced both by the Bad Plus’ history and by Evans’ individualistic response to it. If this means that the trio will veer from its comfortable formulas, everyone will benefit."

== Track listing ==
No.	Title	Writer(s)	Length
1.	"Hurricane Birds"	Reid Anderson	5:30
2.	"Trace"	Anderson	5:01
3.	"Boffadem"	Orrin Evans	5:16
4.	"Safe Passage"	Anderson	3:22
5.	"1983 Regional All-Star"	David King	6:43
6.	"Salvages"	Anderson	5:34
7.	"Commitment"	Evans	4:07
8.	"Lean in the Archway"	King	4:42

Bonus tracks
No.	Title	Writer(s)	Length
9.	"Kerosene II"	Anderson	4:44
10.	"Seams"	Anderson	7:14

== Personnel ==
- Reid Anderson – bass
- Orrin Evans – piano
- David King – drums
