= Activate Infinity =

Studio album by The Bad Plus
- Released: October 25, 2019
- Recorded: May 2019
- Studio: Brooklyn Recording, New York City
- Genre: Jazz
- Length: 37:34
- Label: Edition
- Producer: The Bad Plus

The Bad Plus chronology
Never Stop II (2018)	Activate Infinity (2019)

Professional ratings
Review scores
Source	Rating
All About Jazz	4/5 stars
AllMusic	4/5 stars
DownBeat	4/5 stars
Financial Times	4/5 stars
The Sydney Morning Herald	4/5 stars
The Times	4/5 stars

Activate Infinity is an album by American jazz trio The Bad Plus that was released by Edition on October 25, 2019. The album contains eight original compositions written by band members.

== Reception ==
Thom Jurek in his review for AllMusic stated, " Activate Infinity is a canny, wildly creative expression of the Bad Plus' collective persona; it's inspired, sophisticated, fresh, and a joy to encounter, time and again." Mike Hobart of Financial Times stated, "The set is bookended by Reid Anderson’s ear-friendly melodies. Here, closely worked voicings and clatter and whumpf drumming stick close to the core The Bad Plus aesthetic, with “Avail” and “Slow Reactors” opening the album at a rocking pace, and “Love is the Answer” closing with a bittersweet mood. At the album's centre, core values follow a less predictable path with two compositions apiece from Evans and King." Writing for The Times Chris Pearson commented, "Ethan Iverson’s departure from the Bad Plus last year caused much anxiety. After 17 years, could this acoustic jazz-rock trio survive losing their pianist? The fears were unfounded, not only because Iverson’s replacement, Orrin Evans, is such a good fit, but also because the star soloist is in fact the drummer, Dave King. Someone has to fill the voids between those rigid riffs — King does it superbly."

A. D. Amorosi of JazzTimes noted "...the all-original Activate Infinity finds Evans mashing his own sinister soulfulness into swift Monk-like runs (“Avail”), playful Guaraldi-isms (“Thrift Store Jewelry”) and pastoral Bruce Hornsby-ish themes (“The Red Door”) without losing sight of his unique tone. King, meanwhile, is an absolute monster." Writing for DownBeat Jim Macnie mentioned, "One Bad Plus tenet remains intact: Their chemistry still can thrill. How the band moves from carefree jaunt to floating extroversion is jazz magic. Filled with intra-group wiles, Activate Infinity reminds listeners that these guys need only to rely on themselves." John Shand of The Sydney Morning Herald added, "Perhaps Evans emphasises the band's eccentricity slightly less than did Iverson, but in return he builds greater suppleness into the sound; a jazzy fluidity that re-contextualizes the back-beat music. The recording quality is exquisite, and the Edition label continues to grow in significance."

== Track listing ==
No.	Title	Writer(s)	Length
1.	"Avail"	Anderson	3:15
2.	"Slow Reactors"	Anderson	5:52
3.	"Thrift Store Jewelry"	King	4:47
4.	"The Red Door"	Evans	4:03
5.	"Looking in Your Eyes"	Evans	3:59
6.	"Dovetail Nicely"	King	5:07
7.	"Undersea Reflection"	Anderson	3:00
8.	"Love Is the Answer"	Anderson	7:35
Total length:			37:34

== Personnel ==
- Orrin Evans – piano
- Reid Anderson – double bass
- David King – drums
