= The Purity of the Turf =

The Purity of the Turf may refer to:

- The Purity of the Turf (short story), a short story by P. G. Wodehouse
- The Purity of the Turf (Jeeves and Wooster), an episode of the British TV series Jeeves and Wooster, based on the short story
- The Purity of the Turf (album), a 2016 album by Ethan Iverson
