= Give (The Bad Plus album) =

Studio album by The Bad Plus
- Released: March 9, 2004
- Recorded: Fall 2003 at Real World Studios, Box, Wiltshire, England
- Genre: Jazz
- Length: 52:23
- Label: Sony
- Producer: Tchad Blake, The Bad Plus

The Bad Plus chronology
These Are the Vistas (2003)	Give (2004)	Suspicious Activity? (2005)

Professional ratings
Aggregate scores
Source	Rating
Metacritic	75/100
Review scores
Source	Rating
AllMusic	3/5 stars
Pitchfork	(5.6/10)
Rolling Stone	4/5 stars
The Village Voice	A−
The Penguin Guide to Jazz Recordings	4/4 stars

Give is the third studio album released by The Bad Plus. It contains covers of Ornette Coleman's "Street Woman," The Pixies' "Velouria," and Black Sabbath's "Iron Man." The recording of "Knowing Me, Knowing You" on the European release is not the same as the one that appeared on The Bad Plus album.

== Track listing ==
No.	Title	Writer(s)	Length
1.	"1979 Semi-Finalist"	David King	5:18
2.	"Cheney Piñata"	Ethan Iverson	4:49
3.	"Street Woman"	Ornette Coleman	3:58
4.	"And Here We Test Our Powers of Observation"	Reid Anderson	4:22
5.	"Frog and Toad"	King	3:37
6.	"Velouria"	Charles Thompson	5:37
7.	"Layin' a Strip For the Higher-Self State Line"	King	4:17
8.	"Do Your Sums/Die Like a Dog/Play For Home"	Iverson	5:05
9.	"Dirty Blonde"	Anderson	3:42
10.	"Neptune (The Planet)"	Anderson	5:30
11.	"Iron Man"	Geezer Butler, Tony Iommi, Ozzy Osbourne, Bill Ward	6:02

European bonus track
No.	Title	Writer(s)	Length
12.	"Knowing Me, Knowing You"	Benny Andersson, Stig Anderson, Björn Ulvaeus	4:23

Japanese bonus track
No.	Title	Writer(s)	Length
12.	"Every Breath You Take"	Sting	6:33

== Personnel ==
- Ethan Iverson – piano
- Reid Anderson – double bass
- David King – drums
- Tchad Blake – producer
