= Michelle Lordi =

American musician and educator

Michelle Lordi is a jazz vocalist, bandleader, and educator. She is currently a member of the performance faculty at Princeton University, where she works with undergraduate jazz vocalists and ensembles. She has collaborated with artists like Orrin Evans, Nasheet Waits and Rudresh Mahanthappa.

== Life and education ==
Lordi was born and raised in the Philadelphia area. She studied photography at Parsons School of Design at The New School in New York City. During her college years, she developed an interest in jazz, often spending time with jazz students practicing their instruments.

== Career ==
Lordi began performing professionally in her late thirties. She became a regular presence on the Philadelphia jazz scene, appearing at venues such as Chris’ Jazz Café and Paris Bistro & Jazz Café. In addition to performing, she has curated live jazz events at locations including the Abington Art Center and Vintage Bar and Grill, where she hosted a weekly Wednesday night series. She recorded 2023's Two Moons for Evans' label Imani Records.

== Discography ==
- Michelle Lordi Sings (2014)
- Drive (2015)
- Dream a Little Dream (2017)
- Break Up With the Sound (2019)
- Two Moons (2023)
