= These Are the Vistas =

Studio album by the Bad Plus
- Released: February 11, 2003
- Recorded: Real World Studios, September 30 – October 5, 2002
- Genre: Jazz
- Length: 52:28
- Label: Columbia
- Producer: Tchad Blake, The Bad Plus

The Bad Plus chronology
The Bad Plus (2001)	These Are the Vistas (2003)	Give (2004)

Professional ratings
Aggregate scores
Source	Rating
Metacritic	81/100
Review scores
Source	Rating
AllMusic	4/5 stars
Entertainment Weekly	A−
Pitchfork	(7.0/10)
Rolling Stone	4/5 stars
The Penguin Guide to Jazz Recordings	3.5/4 stars

These Are the Vistas is the second studio album by the jazz trio the Bad Plus, and the band's first album for a major label (Columbia Records). The album was the listening public's first widespread opportunity to hear the band, which Jim Fusilli of the Wall Street Journal called a "jazz power trio with a rock-and-roll heart." The album features three cover songs: Nirvana's "Smells Like Teen Spirit," Blondie's "Heart of Glass," and Aphex Twin's "Flim". In November 2009, NPR's All Songs Considered selected the album as one of the 50 "most important" recordings of the decade.

== Production ==
According to JazzTimes, producer-engineer Tchad Blake "comes to [jazz] from the world of Los Lobos, Tom Waits and Pearl Jam" and "approaches These Are the Vistas with an ear for acoustic frictions. His firm but unobtrusive direction showcases the Bad Plus in a way that's somehow both huge-sounding and stripped-down."

== Track listing ==
No.	Title	Writer(s)	Length
1.	"Big Eater"	Reid Anderson	3:53
2.	"Keep the Bugs Off Your Glass and the Bears Off Your Ass"	David King	5:49
3.	"Smells Like Teen Spirit"	Kurt Cobain, Dave Grohl, Krist Novoselic	5:57
4.	"Everywhere You Turn"	Anderson	4:56
5.	"1972 Bronze Medalist"	King	5:20
6.	"Guilty"	Ethan Iverson	5:35
7.	"Boo-Wah"	Iverson	3:55
8.	"Flim"	Richard D. James	4:05
9.	"Heart of Glass"	Deborah Harry, Chris Stein	4:47
10.	"Silence Is the Question"	Anderson	8:11

European and Japanese bonus track
No.	Title	Writer(s)	Length
11.	"What Love Is This"	Iverson	4:07

== Personnel ==
- Ethan Iverson – piano
- Reid Anderson – acoustic bass
- David King – drums
- Tchad Blake – producer
