= Dier =

Dier is a German surname of several possible origins. Notable people with the surname include:

- Brett Dier (born 1990), Canadian actor
- Dirk Dier (born 1972), German tennis player
- Eric Dier (born 1994), English footballer
- Richard A. Dier (1914–1972), American judge
- Tobias Dier (born 1976), German golfer

== See also ==
- Diers
- Diehr
- Thier
