= Thier =

Thier is a German surname. Notable people with the surname include:

- Henry de Thier or Henri Dumont (1610–1684), baroque composer
- Nigel Tier (born 1958), English badminton player
- Samuel O. Thier (1937–2026), American medical professor
- Steffen Thier (born 1980), German rugby union player

== See also ==
- Diers
- Diehr
- Thiers (disambiguation)
