= Halloween, Alaska =

American indie rock band

- Origin: Twin Cities, Minnesota, United States
- Genres: indie rock, electronic rock, indietronica
- Years active: 2002–2026
- Labels: Princess Records; East Side Digital; Amble Down Records
- Members: James Diers (voice, guitar, keys); Jake Hanson (guitar); Bill Shaw (electric bass guitar); Dave King (drums)
- Past members: Ev Olcott (2002–2008); Matt Friesen (electric bass guitar, 2002–2009)
- Website: www.halloweenalaska.com

Halloween, Alaska was a Minneapolis-based band that consisted of James Diers (voice, guitar, keys), Jake Hanson (brother of Tapes 'n Tapes drummer Jeremy Hanson, guitar), Bill Shaw (electric bass guitar), and Dave King (acoustic and electronic drums). All of the group's members lived in the Twin Cities. Original keyboardist and programmer Ev left the band in 2008. Original bassist Matt Friesen left the band in 2009. The group first formed in 2002, and work on a self-titled debut soon began to be recorded. Completed in 2003, the disc earned considerable acclaim not only in the Twin Cities but also from indie tastemakers and college radio programmers across the US, combining ambient electronic elements with moody alt-pop songwriting. Two tracks from the disc were featured in the Fox television series The O.C.: "Des Moines" in season one, and "All the Arms Around You" in season two. The track "State Trooper", featured on their self-titled debut, is a cover version of the song by Bruce Springsteen. East Side Digital reissued the album in 2005, adding remixes and bonus tracks. A second disc titled Too Tall to Hide was released in 2005 and features another cover song - "I Can't Live Without My Radio" by LL Cool J. Champagne Downtown was released on April 7, 2009. An EP of remixes by Twin Cities artists was released in November 2009. Their most recent album, Le Centre, was released in 2018.

Members of the group are or have been part of the bands The Bad Plus, Love-Cars, Happy Apple, 12 Rods, Cowboy Curtis, Minneapolis Dub Ensemble, Post Mortem Grinner, and The Gang Font feat. Interloper.

The band was not named after a real town in Alaska. According to Diers, King "came up with the name ... before we even starting playing together, actually," and felt that the combination of the two words was "evocative of some of the moods and textures he wanted us to be looking at."

The band played its final show on January 23rd, 2026 at the Dakota Jazz Club.

== Discography ==
=== Albums ===
- Halloween, Alaska (Princess, 2003; East Side Digital, 2005)
- Too Tall to Hide (East Side Digital, 2005)
- Champagne Downtown (East Side Digital, 2009)
- All Night the Calls Came In (Amble Down, 2011)
- Le Centre (Self-released, 2018)

=== EPs ===
- Liberties (Amble Down, 2013)

=== Remix albums ===
- Occasion: Remixes (2009)
- Fake Mistakes: Remixes (2012)

=== Compilation appearances ===
- "Des Moines" (alternate version), Live Current Vol. 1 (Minnesota Public Radio, 2005)
- "Drowned" (VIC 20 remix), Twin Town High Music Yearbook Vol. 8 (Pulse, 2006)
- "Halloween" (Housewares remix), For Callum benefit compilation (Catlick Records, 2007)
- "After the Flood" (Talk Talk cover), Spirit of Talk Talk (Fierce Panda, 2012)
