= For All I Care =

Studio album by The Bad Plus
- Released: October 20, 2008
- Recorded: April 2008
- Studios: Pachyderm Studio, MN
- Genre: Jazz
- Length: 49:46
- Labels: EmArcy (EU); Heads Up (US)
- Producer: The Bad Plus

The Bad Plus chronology
Prog (2007)	For All I Care (2008)	Never Stop (2010)

Professional ratings
Aggregate scores
Source	Rating
Metacritic	68/100
Review scores
Source	Rating
All About Jazz	3.5/5 stars
AllMusic	4/5 stars
American Songwriter	3/5 stars
The Guardian	3/5 stars
Paste	6.6/10
PopMatters	4/10

For All I Care is a studio album by American jazz trio The Bad Plus with Wendy Lewis on vocals. The album was released in Europe on October 20, 2008, by EmArcy and in the U.S. on February 3, 2009, by Heads Up. This is the first Bad Plus album to include a vocalist, as well as the first to feature no original songs. Although the Bad Plus are known for playing cover versions of rock songs, this is their first album with nothing but cover songs, including a few 20th-century classical pieces. David King explained to Star Tribune that the main inspiration for the record was the seminal 1963 album John Coltrane and Johnny Hartman. As he mentioned, "The band still played like it was the John Coltrane Quartet, with or without Hartman. That's what we really aimed for."

== Reception ==
At Metacritic, which assigns a normalized rating out of 100 to reviews from mainstream critics, the album received an average score of 68, based on 11 reviews, which indicates "generally favorable reviews". The album was extensively screened by music critics.

Fred Kaplan of Stereophile wrote, "...the band’s new album, For All I Care [...], resolves the question: The Bad Plus, it’s now clear, can go on for as long as they want; their resourcefulness seems to be limitless. This is their most ambitious, and most accomplished, album, the one that should persuade the final doubters that there’s serious—not brow-furrowed, in fact still quite playful, but in the best sense of the word serious—music going on here." A reviewer of DownBeat stated, "The album marks the first Bad Plus recording to include a guest vocalist, alt-rock singer Wendy Lewis, as the fourth instrument in its sonic arsenal. In the midst of The Bad Plus’ characteristically unconventional approach, Lewis strove to avoid theatrics and let the lyrics and melodies speak for themselves." Michael J. West of JazzTimes commented, "The Bad Plus maintains that this facet of their work is not a gimmick or novelty. They play the rock-era songs with humor and irreverence, but no more than on originals and jazz compositions. This music is simply the soundtrack to their time and place..." In his review for All About Jazz, Jeff Vrabel stated, "With For All I Care, The Bad Plus opted to keep things as simple as possible within the new set of sonic guidelines."

John Fordham of The Guardian commented, "There's less jazz improv, but it's a set that's going to find the Bad Plus a lot of new friends, and recover some old ones." Corey duBrowa of Paste mentioned, "...for all of The Bad Plus’ instrumental prowess and fearless exploration, it's Lewis’ voice that stars here, bending notes and emotion to her will like so many coat hangers left outside in a tornado." Aaron Lafont of OffBeat wrote, "For too long has post-modern jazz been preoccupied with making the strange, stranger. Here’s to the Bad Plus and Wendy Lewis for eroding the borders that separate jazz and rock." Evan Sawdey of PopMatters gave the album a negative review, stating, "In the end, For All I Care isn't a bad album. It's just a very unremarkable effort from a band that we've grown to expect so much more from." Peter Hum of Ottawa Citizen wrote, "The Bad Plus pushes its marriage of jazz’s improvisatory zeal and rock’s energy and attitude even further with For All I Care." Jeff Tamarkin writing for East Bay Express added, "though it inches the Bad Plus closer to the pop mainstream, it never loses the particular rhythmic and harmonic quirks that have defined them so far."

== Track listing ==
No.	Title	Writer(s)	Length
1.	"Lithium"	Kurt Cobain	4:46
2.	"Comfortably Numb"	David Gilmour, Roger Waters	6:41
3.	"Fém (Etude No. 8)"	György Ligeti	3:20
4.	"Radio Cure"	Jay Bennett, Jeff Tweedy	6:40
5.	"Long Distance Runaround"	Jon Anderson	3:43
6.	"Semi-Simple Variations"	Milton Babbitt	3:32
7.	"How Deep Is Your Love"	Barry Gibb, Maurice Gibb, Robin Gibb	3:39
8.	"Barracuda"	Ann Wilson, Michael DeRosier, Nancy Wilson, Roger Fisher	3:21
9.	"Lock, Stock and Teardrops"	Roger Miller	4:08
10.	"Variation d'Apollon"	Igor Stravinsky	4:33
11.	"Feeling Yourself Disintegrate"	Michael Ivins, Steven Drozd, Wayne Coyne	4:47
12.	"Semi-Simple Variations (Alternate Version)"	Milton Babbitt	1:11

Vinyl bonus tracks
No.	Title	Writer(s)	Length
13.	"New Year's Day"	Adam Clayton, David Evans, Paul David Hewson, Larry Mullen	6:02
14.	"You and I Is a Comfort Zone"	Reid Anderson	4:40

Japanese bonus track
No.	Title	Writer(s)	Length
13.	"Blue Velvet"	Bernie Wayne, Lee Morris	5:58

== Personnel ==
- Ethan Iverson – piano, bells
- Reid Anderson – bass, vocals
- David King – drums, vocals
- Wendy Lewis – vocals
- The Bad Plus – producer
- Tchad Blake – mixing
- Brent Sigmeth – recording
