= Common Practice (album) =

Live album by Ethan Iverson Quartet
- Released: September 20, 2019
- Recorded: January 2017
- Venue: The Village Vanguard, NYC
- Genre: Jazz
- Length: 1:05:50
- Label: ECM; ECM 2643
- Producer: Manfred Eicher

Ethan Iverson chronology
Temporary Kings (2018)	Common Practice (2019)

Professional ratings
Review scores
Source	Rating
AllMusic	4/5 stars
DownBeat	4/5 stars
Jazz Journal	5/5 stars
The Guardian	4/5 stars
RTÉ.ie	3.5/5 stars

Common Practice is a live album by American jazz pianist Ethan Iverson's quartet featuring trumpeter Tom Harrell. The album was released on 20 September 2019 by the ECM label. The album was recorded in Village Vanguard in January 2017.

== Reception ==
In his review AllMusic's Matt Collar wrote "It's that kind of deft spontaneity that makes Common Practice an endlessly engaging listen." Bill Milkowski of DownBeat stated " Throughout the program, Iverson simultaneously offers a heartfelt love letter to standards while spray-painting his own tag all over them. The star here is Harrell, and the man behind the curtain is Iverson." Larry Blumenfeld of The Wall Street Journal commented "This album answers jazz’s current existential question—should we swing or not?—with an emphatic affirmative. Yet it doesn’t sound nostalgic or even terribly conventional, owing to the relaxed and elastic feel achieved by this rhythm section."

Dave Gelly of The Guardian added "Another live album by a jazz quartet playing Great American Songbook tunes? Er, well, up to a point. There are certainly eight vintage standards here, along with a bebop classic and two originals, but I wouldn’t recommend any of them as singalong material." Paddy Kehoe of RTÉ.ie stated " It is pleasant but not overly-so. God forbid you might feel too idyllic, then it's not real enough. In short, the work here is not intended to frighten the horses." Andy Hamilton of Jazz Journal noted "Harrell’s solos in particular, in their apparent simplicity, pathos and melodic beauty, are some of the finest you’ll hear among this year’s releases. As it’s ECM, the live recording is palpably present."

JazzTimes included the album in its list of "Top 50 Albums of 2019".

== Track listing ==
No.	Title	Writer(s)	Length
1.	"The Man I Love"	George Gershwin, Ira Gershwin	6:26
2.	"Philadelphia Creamer"	Iverson	5:59
3.	"Wee"	Denzil Best	5:46
4.	"I Can't Get Started"	Ira Gershwin, Vernon Duke	6:36
5.	"Sentimental Journey"	Benjamin Homer, Bud Green, Les Brown	4:33
6.	"Out of Nowhere"	Edward Heyman, Johnny Green	6:32
7.	"Polka Dots and Moonbeams"	Jimmy Van Heusen, Johnny Burke	6:01
8.	"All the Things You Are"	Jerome Kern, Oscar Hammerstein II	5:51
9.	"Jed From Teaneck"	Iverson	6:31
10.	"I'm Getting Sentimental Over You"	George Bassman, Ned Washington	5:10
11.	"I Remember You"	Johnny Mercer, Victor Schertzinger	6:25
Total length:			1:05:50

== Personnel ==
- Ethan Iverson – piano
- Ben Street – double bass
- Eric McPherson – drums
- Tom Harrell – trumpet
