= Diehr =

Diehr is a German surname. Notable people with the surname include:

- James R. Diehr, inventor, plaintiff in legal case Diamond v. Diehr
- Lothar Diehr (born 1947), German badminton player
- Paula Diehr, American biostatistician
- Wolfgang Diehr, science fiction novelist, author of Fuzzy Ergo Sum

== See also ==
- Diers
- Dier
