= Made Possible =

Studio album by The Bad Plus
- Released: September 25, 2012
- Recorded: November 2011
- Studio: Clubhouse
- Genre: Jazz
- Length: 57:46
- Label: E1 Music
- Producer: The Bad Plus

The Bad Plus chronology
Never Stop (2010)	Made Possible (2012)	The Rite of Spring (2014)

Professional ratings
Aggregate scores
Source	Rating
Metacritic	85/100
Review scores
Source	Rating
AllMusic	4.5/5 stars
The Arts Desk	4/5 stars
Exclaim!	5/10
The Guardian	4/5 stars
PopMatters	8/10

Made Possible is a 2012 studio album by American jazz trio The Bad Plus released by E1 Music. It is the group's eighth studio album. Made Possible is the first album by The Bad Plus to feature electronic instruments.

== Reception ==
In his review for AllMusic, Thom Jurek stated, "Made Possible finds the Bad Plus openly wrestling with the complex interrelationship between rhythm, harmony, and improvisation (individual and collective). It offers a more inviting aural view of the group confronting these questions, and the historic weight and imposing boundaries associated with "the piano trio" in jazz. Rather than try to simply find answers, the Bad Plus engage the listener in the process of asking more questions about music itself." The Guardian's John Fordham wrote, "Made Possible is at once vintage Bad Plus in its striking themes, nonchalant time-bends and full-on collective improv, and proof of this awesome ensemble's continuing evolution. All the tracks are originals, apart from the late drummer Paul Motian's poignant Victoria, and there's some limited, but telling, use of electronics."

John Garratt of PopMatters added, "Many a pundit will still allow themselves to become wet hens in the presence of a Blad Plus album, and that's just very unfortunate. Taken at face value, Made Possible is as great as anything else they've done...and they've done quite a bit." Exclaim!'s Daniel Sylvester wrote, "Although Ethan Iverson's piano remains as dazzling as ever and the rhythm section still challenges jazz's stuffy leanings, the Bad Plus can't help but feel gimmicky and out of their element on Made Possible. This is a far cry from their limitless origins." Thomas Conred of JazzTimes noted, "They are still loud and inappropriate. They are still impulsive and obnoxious and irresistible as street urchins. And they have found some fresh ways to be all these things. The tunes are new, original and ambitious, and incorporate occasional synthesizers and electronic drums."

== Track listing ==
No.	Title	Writer(s)	Length
1.	"Pound for Pound"	Reid Anderson	6:10
2.	"Seven Minute Mind"	Anderson	5:37
3.	"Re-Elect That"	Ethan Iverson	6:25
4.	"Wolf Out"	David King	6:06
5.	"Sing for a Silver Dollar"	Iverson	5:42
6.	"For My Eyes Only"	King	5:21
7.	"I Want to Feel Good, Pt. 2"	King	3:56
8.	"In Stitches"	Anderson	14:11
9.	"Victoria"	Paul Motian	4:18
Total length:			57:46

== Personnel ==
Band

- Reid Anderson – bass, electronics, synthesizer
- Ethan Iverson – piano
- David King – drums, electric drums

Technical

- Chris Hinderaker – executive producer
- Darryl Pitt – executive producer
- Pete Rende – engineering, mixing
- Huntley Miller – mastering
- Sherman Iverson – illustrations
- Greg Meyers – design
