= The Rite of Spring (The Bad Plus album) =

Studio album by The Bad Plus
- Released: March 25, 2014
- Recorded: June 2013
- Studio: Kaleidoscope Sound Studios
- Genre: Jazz
- Length: 39:17
- Label: Sony Masterworks
- Producer: The Bad Plus

The Bad Plus chronology
Made Possible (2012)	The Rite of Spring (2014)	Inevitable Western (2014)

Professional ratings
Aggregate scores
Source	Rating
Metacritic	84/100
Review scores
Source	Rating
AllMusic	4/5 stars
Los Angeles Times	3/4 stars
Pitchfork	6.7/10
PopMatters	8/10

The Rite of Spring is a 2014 studio album by American jazz trio The Bad Plus. It is the group's ninth studio album. It is an interpretation of the Igor Stravinsky orchestral composition.

The trio first performed the music live in 2011.

== Reception ==
Will Layman of PopMatters wrote, "This version is not the usual "jazz version" of a classical composition. Usually, the jazz/classical combination means that melodies and harmonies from classical work are used as the written "song" for a standard jazz performance, with the lead instruments improvising new choruses over the "song structure" of the classical piece... Still, this is in every respect a jazz record." Chris Barton of Los Angeles Times mentioned, "The Bad Plus mostly set aside improvisation in an effort to capture Stravinsky’s modernist vision, but in some ways it’s never sounded freer." Jason Greene of Pitchfork wrote, "The feat is still impressive, in an athletic way. The trio have been mapping out this version in concert for years, and you could never accuse them of scaling this mountain without planning ahead of time. But the Rite should elicit gasps, not cock eyebrows—the latter of which is the most extreme reaction the Bad Plus manage to provoke. It's ironic that after tackling (and matching) Black Sabbath and Nirvana, it would be Stravinsky that would finally make the Bad Plus sound positively tame." Zachary Woolfe wrote in The New York Times, "a suavely hallucinatory Coltrane/Coleman flavor ... confident playing that makes for fun listening ... for sheer strangeness and shock, Stravinsky’s original keeps outdoing its descendants."

== Track listing ==
First Part: Adoration of the Earth

All tracks are written by Igor Stravinsky.

No.	Title	Length
1.	"Introduction"	5:06
2.	"The Augurs of Spring"	3:29
3.	"Ritual of Abduction"	1:23
4.	"Spring Rounds"	4:52
5.	"Games of the Two Rival Tribes / Procession of the Sage"	3:03
6.	"The Sage / Dance of the Earth"	1:48

Second Part: The Sacrifice

All tracks are written by Igor Stravinsky.

No.	Title	Length
7.	"Introduction"	3:59
8.	"Mystic Circle of the Young Girls"	3:01
9.	"Glorification of the Chosen One"	1:43
10.	"Evocation of the Ancestors / Ritual Action of the Ancestors"	5:32
11.	"Sacrificial Dance"	5:21

== Personnel ==
The Bad Plus

- Reid Anderson – bass, electronics
- Ethan Iverson – piano
- David King – drums

Technical personnel

- Darryl Pitt – executive producer
- Pete Rende – engineering, mixing
- Huntley Miller – mastering
- Chris Hinderaker – production coordination
- David King – artwork
- Greg Meyers – design
- Jay Fram – photography
