= The Bad Plus Joshua Redman =

Studio album by The Bad Plus and Joshua Redman
- Released: May 26, 2015
- Studio: Brooklyn Recording, NYC
- Genre: Jazz
- Length: 59:14
- Label: Nonesuch Records
- Producer: The Bad Plus, Joshua Redman

The Bad Plus chronology
Inevitable Western (2014)	The Bad Plus Joshua Redman (2015)	It's Hard (2016)

Joshua Redman chronology
Trios Live (2014)	The Bad Plus Joshua Redman (2015)	Nearness (2016)

Professional ratings
Aggregate scores
Source	Rating
Metacritic	84/100
Review scores
Source	Rating
Allmusic	4/5 stars
The Australian	4/5 stars
The Buffalo News	3.5/4 stars
Daily Telegraph	4/5 stars
Drowned in Sound	8/10
Financial Times	3/5 stars
The Guardian	4/5 stars
Jazz Forum	5/5 stars
Jazzwise	4/5 stars
PopMatters	8/10

The Bad Plus Joshua Redman is a 2015 album by jazz trio The Bad Plus and saxophonist Joshua Redman. The album was generally positively received, achieving a Metacritic score of 84%.

== Background ==
The record is the group's eleventh studio album and the first one in collaboration with Joshua Redman. It only contains original compositions, except for "Dirty Blonde" and "Silence is the Question" which had appeared on previous albums.

== Reception ==
Evan Haga of JazzTimes wrote " The album includes nine tracks, including two compositions apiece by Redman and pianist Ethan Iverson, four by bassist Reid Anderson (including two pieces previously recorded by TBP) and one by drummer Dave King. There are none of TBP’s calling-card deconstructions of pop hits, and you don’t miss them; the original music is excellent and wide-ranging and deftly arranged, in a way that underscores both the trio’s affinity for composition and the fresher, more noticeably improvised terrain that Redman’s presence opens up". Nate Chinen of The New York Times mentioned, "As a chemistry experiment, the album is a knockout."

Michael Ullman of The Arts Fuse wrote "One of the longest lasting small groups in jazz, The Bad Plus is also one of the most creatively satisfying. With the galvanic addition of Redman, the ensemble is now made up of four intense virtuosos whose musical intelligence is as impeccable as their instrumental chops. They write exquisitely crafted originals in a startling range of styles."

Jon Garelick of The Boston Globe mentioned "Having covered Black Sabbath’s “Iron Man,” Stravinsky's “Rite of Spring,” and, most recently, Ornette Coleman's epochal “Science Fiction,” piano trio the Bad Plus returns to its own intricate explorations of song form and improvisation". Mike Hobart of Financial Times commented, "Here, saxophonist Joshua Redman adds much-needed heft and brings the best out of drummer Dave King and pianist Ethan Iverson, transforming a somewhat derivative repertoire into an appealing personal statement."

== Track listing ==
No.	Title	Writer(s)	Length
1.	"As This Moment Slips Away"	Anderson	6:55
2.	"Beauty Has It Hard"	King	7:03
3.	"County Seat"	Iverson	3:06
4.	"The Mending"	Redman	4:13
5.	"Dirty Blonde"	Anderson	5:35
6.	"Faith Through Error"	Iverson	3:21
7.	"Lack the Faith But Not the Wine"	Anderson	7:16
8.	"Friend or Foe"	Redman	8:39
9.	"Silence Is the Question"	Anderson	13:30
Total length:			59:14

Japanese bonus track
No.	Title	Writer(s)	Length
10.	"Undersea Reflection"	Anderson	5:07

== Personnel ==
- Reid Anderson – bass
- Ethan Iverson – piano
- David King – drums
- Joshua Redman – saxophone
