= Suspicious Activity? =

Studio album by The Bad Plus
- Released: September 20, 2005
- Recorded: May 2005
- Studio: Real World Studios, Box, Wiltshire, England
- Genre: Jazz
- Length: 62:22
- Label: Columbia
- Producer: Tchad Blake, The Bad Plus

The Bad Plus chronology
Give (2004)	Suspicious Activity? (2005)	Prog (2007)

Professional ratings
Review scores
Source	Rating
All About Jazz	3.5/5 stars
AllMusic	4/5 stars
The Guardian	2/5 stars
Rolling Stone	4/5 stars
The Penguin Guide to Jazz Recordings	3/4 stars

Suspicious Activity? is the fourth studio album by the American jazz band The Bad Plus. The band had previously garnered attention for covering well-known rock songs in an "acoustic power trio" style, but Suspicious Activity? includes only one cover version: the theme to the 1981 movie Chariots of Fire. Instead, the album focuses on the band's original music, including the track "O.G. (Original Gentleman)," which is a tribute to jazz drummer Elvin Jones.

This would be The Bad Plus' final album for Columbia Records, as the band and the label parted ways in 2006.

== Outtakes ==
Several cover versions from the Suspicious Activity? recording sessions are available on iTunes and other major online services, including Led Zeppelin's "Immigrant Song," Queen's "We Are the Champions," and Björk's "Human Behaviour."

== Extended copy protection ==
In November 2005, it was revealed that Sony was distributing albums with Extended Copy Protection, a controversial feature that automatically installed rootkit software on any Microsoft Windows machine upon insertion of the disc. In addition to preventing the CD's contents from being copied, it was also revealed that the software reported the user's listening habits back to Sony and also exposed the computer to malicious attacks that exploited insecure features of the rootkit software. Though Sony refused to release a list of the affected CDs, the Electronic Frontier Foundation identified Suspicious Activity? as one of the discs with the invasive software.

== Reception ==
Brent Burton of JazzTimes stated, "...much of the solid new album is about modern-day contrast. King and bassist Reid Anderson were obviously raised on rock and hip-hop (what 30-something musician wasn’t?) and they show it off with the muscular thwap and throb of their accompaniment... Perhaps Iverson and Co. need not have slaughtered a sacred cow to remind us that it’s 2005, not 1955. But, hey, would they be where they are today if they never tried?" Brian P. Lonergan of All About Jazz wrote, "The trio's third major-label album, Suspicious Activity?, will do little to quell the arguments the previous two have fueled in the jazz community. And though the approach here is not a radical departure from that on These Are the Vistas or Give, the music does advance the trio's adventurous conceptions of form and rhythmic variation." John L. Walters of The Guardian gave the album a negative review, commenting, "So why is listening to their new album such a trial? Maybe they have no taste."

== Track listing ==
No.	Title	Writer(s)	Length
1.	"Prehensile Dream"	Reid Anderson	8:12
2.	"Anthem for the Earnest"	David King	6:38
3.	"Let Our Garden Grow"	Ethan Iverson	6:57
4.	"The Empire Strikes Backwards"	King	5:38
5.	"Knows the Difference"	Anderson	6:58
6.	"Lost of Love"	Anderson	8:38
7.	"Rhinoceros Is My Profession"	Anderson	5:44
8.	"O.G. (Original Gentleman)"	Iverson	6:37
9.	"(Theme from) Chariots of Fire"	Evangelos Papathanassiou	4:57
10.	"Forces"	Anderson	7:43

Japanese bonus track
No.	Title	Writer(s)	Length
11.	"We Are the Champions"	Freddie Mercury	7:43

== Personnel ==
- Ethan Iverson – piano
- Reid Anderson – bass
- David King – drums
- Tchad Blake – producer
