= Inevitable Western =

Studio album by The Bad Plus
- Released: August 25, 2014
- Recorded: January 2014
- Studio: The Terrarium, Minneapolis, MN
- Genre: Jazz
- Length: 50:48
- Label: Okeh Records
- Producer: The Bad Plus

The Bad Plus chronology
The Rite of Spring (2014)	Inevitable Western (2014)	The Bad Plus Joshua Redman (2015)

Professional ratings
Review scores
Source	Rating
AllMusic	4/5 stars
PopMatters	8/10

Inevitable Western is a 2014 album by jazz trio The Bad Plus. It is the group's tenth studio album and it only contains original compositions. The rear CD insert features a photo of "Big Tex", the marketing icon of the State Fair of Texas.

== Reception ==
Bill Beuttler of JazzTimes stated, "The new disc eschews covers, both the highbrow variety and the more plebeian material that the group is renowned (and occasionally reviled) for reworking. Instead, the band members contribute three original compositions apiece. Much of it has a classical feel, the bluesier side of jazz mostly ignored but its improvisational interplay emphasized." Will Layman of PopMatters noted, "At this point in its career, the Bad Plus is at the height of its powers -- commanding a following of listeners who will trust the adventure that every recording brings. It's notable that they are now signed to Okeh, Sony's new jazz imprint and -- therefore -- the successor to the place that Columbia Records used to hold in the jazz world: a major label, a place to which "the record industry" is lifting the jazz artists who might still have a chance to catch on with regular folks and to be—gosh—popular. The Bad Plus never seems to abuse its popularity. It asks a lot of listeners who may not be out-jazz hounds or classical fanatics, but it provides the pleasures of energy, melody, and honesty. They are creative music heroes, and in Inevitable Western they have another trophy, another triumph. Let's keep following them into battle."

== Track listing ==
No.	Title	Writer(s)	Length
1.	"I Hear You"	Reid Anderson	5:31
2.	"Gold Prisms Incorporated"	David King	6:28
3.	"Self Serve"	Ethan Iverson	4:34
4.	"You Will Lose All Fear"	Anderson	6:51
5.	"Do It Again"	Anderson	3:55
6.	"Epistolary Echoes"	King	4:16
7.	"Adopted Highway"	King	9:43
8.	"Mr. Now"	Iverson	4:03
9.	"Inevitable Western"	Iverson	5:24
Total length:			50:48

== Personnel ==
The Bad Plus

- Reid Anderson – bass
- Ethan Iverson – piano
- David King – drums

Technical personnel

- Chris Hinderaker – executive producer
- Darryl Pitt – executive producer
- Jason Orris – engineering, mixing, illustrations
- Huntley Miller – mastering
- Greg Meyers – design
- David King – artwork
