= Thiers =

Thiers or Thier is a French place name and surname. It may refer to:

== People ==
- Adolphe Thiers (1797–1877), French statesman and historian
- Emiel Thiers, co-founder of Verdinaso
- Harry D. Thiers (1919–2000), American mycologist
- Jean-Baptiste Thiers (1636-1703), French theologian
- Jean du Thiers (died 1559), French Minister of Finance under Henri II
- Louisa Thiers (1814–1926), American supercentenarian
- Manfred Thiers, bassist for Moti Special
- Saint Stephen of Thiers, medieval Saint of the Roman Catholic Church
- Floris De Tier (born 1992), Belgian racing cyclist
- Kai Tier, Australian comedian and actor
- Nancy Hopkins Tier (1909–1997), American aviator

== Places in France ==
- Canton of Thiers, Puy-de-Dôme, in the eponymous arrondissement
  - Arrondissement of Thiers, Puy-de-Dôme
  - Thiers, Puy-de-Dôme, a commune in the eponymous canton
- Thiers, Marseille, neighbourhood of the 1st arrondissement of Marseille
- Thiers-sur-Thève, a commune in the Oise department

== Other uses ==
- President Thiers Bank, a bank and seamount near Rapa Iti in French Polynesia
- SA Thiers, a French soccer team
- Thiers Coal Mine, Bruay-sur-l'Escaut, Nord, France
- Thiers' law (good money drives out bad)
- Thiers wall, a defensive wall in Paris

== See also ==
- Tiers (disambiguation)
- Thier
