= Never Stop (The Bad Plus album) =

2010 studio album by the Bad Plus

Studio album by the Bad Plus
- Released: September 14, 2010
- Recorded: March 2010
- Studios: Pachyderm, Cannon Falls, MN
- Genre: Jazz
- Length: 58:15
- Label: E1 Music
- Producers: The Bad Plus, Paul Hussey

The Bad Plus chronology
| For All I Care (2008) | Never Stop (2010) | Made Possible (2012) |

Professional ratings
Review scores
| Source | Rating |
|---|---|
| AllMusic | 4/5 stars |
| PopMatters | 7/10 |

Never Stop is the seventh studio album by American jazz trio the Bad Plus, released on September 14, 2010 by E1 Music label. This album is the first by the band to consist entirely of original compositions. The album consists of 10 original tracks written by bandmembers. A follow-up originals-only album, Never Stop II, was released in 2018.

== Reception ==
Nilan Perera of Exclaim! stated, "These guys are omnivorous, to say the least. Never Stop, however, is an album of originals that, not surprisingly reflects this nature quite admirably and, in some cases, quite humorously... But, all things considered, this release is predominantly an imaginative, confident offering of jazz piano trio laced with strength, tightness of sound and execution that reflects the past decade of constant recording and performance." In his review for AllMusic, Thom Jurek wrote, "The Bad Plus' originals have always been provocative, but being parceled between covers, their impact was unduly blunted. Hearing an entire program of them on Never Stop offers listeners a full appreciation of just how innovative and creative -- and yet accessible -- they are, even as they redefine and expand the role of the piano trio in jazz." Ryan Reed of PopMatters stated, "No longer hiding behind irony, The Bad Plus emerge unscathed and even more worthy of applause."

Nate Chinen of The New York Times mentioned, "“Never Stop” is the band’s first release of strictly original music... The declarative mood is standard for the Bad Plus, and this show underscored how much of a specialty it has become." Jim Farber of New York Daily News commented, "Despite having no singer, and shunning familiar covers, "Never Stop" honors the band's tradition of balancing beauty and disruption. It is, by turns, elegantly melodic and startlingly avant."

== Track listing ==
| No. | Title | Writer(s) | Length |
|---|---|---|---|
| 1. | "The Radio Tower Has a Beating Heart" | David King | 5:44 |
| 2. | "Never Stop" | Reid Anderson | 3:51 |
| 3. | "You Are" | Anderson | 7:10 |
| 4. | "My Friend Metatron" | King | 4:23 |
| 5. | "People Like You" | Anderson | 9:15 |
| 6. | "Beryl Loves to Dance" | Anderson | 4:00 |
| 7. | "Snowball" | Anderson | 7:41 |
| 8. | "2 P.M." | Ethan Iverson | 4:41 |
| 9. | "Bill Hickman at Home" | Iverson | 9:08 |
| 10. | "Super America" | King | 2:27 |

Bonus tracks
| No. | Title | Writer(s) | Length |
|---|---|---|---|
| 11. | "Birthday Gift" | Iverson | 6:22 |
| 12. | "Lily Pad" | Iverson | 2:40 |

== Personnel ==
- Reid Anderson – bass
- Dave King – drums
- Ethan Iverson – piano
