= Bill Carrothers =

American jazz pianist and composer

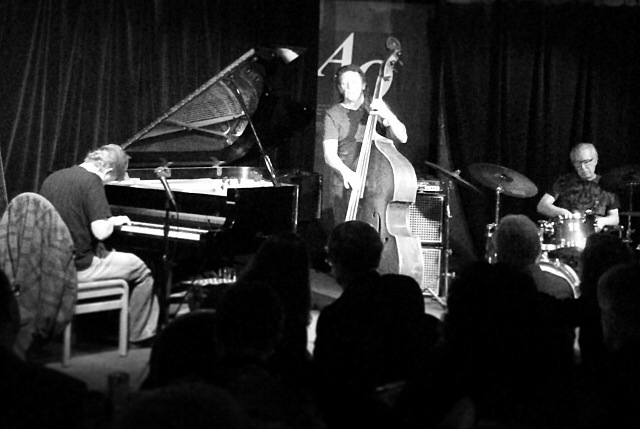
- Carrothers at the Artists' Quarter, 2013

Background information
- Born: July 13, 1964 (age 61); Minneapolis, Minnesota, U.S.
- Genres: Jazz, post-bop
- Occupations: Musician, composer, educator
- Instruments: Piano, Fender Rhodes
- Years active: 1979–present
- Website: www.carrothers.com

Bill Carrothers (born July 13, 1964) is a jazz pianist and composer based in the Upper Peninsula of Michigan. He has cited Clifford Brown, Shirley Horn, and Oscar Peterson as influences on his development as a musician. Carrothers performs without shoes to better feel the piano pedals, and sits in a chair rather than on a traditional piano bench in order to achieve his preferred seating height.

== Career ==
Carrothers began playing piano at age five, studying with his church organist before learning jazz from pianist Bobby Peterson. By age 15 he was performing in jazz clubs, and in 1982 he briefly attended North Texas State University.

After a year at North Texas, Carrothers was a member of Irv Williams' band before moving to New York City in 1988. He performed at the Knitting Factory, The Village Gate, and Birdland as well as Blues Alley in Washington, D.C. He has worked with Buddy DeFranco, Curtis Fuller, Billy Higgins, Freddie Hubbard, Lee Konitz, James Moody, Gary Peacock, Dewey Redman, Charlie Rouse, James Spaulding, Terell Stafford, Toots Thielemans, and Prince.

Carrothers has performed in France at the New Morning, Nevers Jazz Festival, and Marciac Festival, in Belgium at the Audi Jazz Festival and Jazz Middelheim, and he headlined the Rising Star Tour in October, 2000 through Germany, Austria, and Switzerland. In July, 2009, Carrothers played a week-long stand at the Village Vanguard with his European trio (Nicolas Thys and Dre Pallemaerts), a recording of which was released in 2011. In his home state of Michigan, Carrothers performed a solo piano concert at the Gilmore International Keyboard Festival in April, 2010, and he made his Monterey Jazz Festival debut in September, 2011. He is also a regular on the Chicago scene, having performed at the Chicago Jazz Festival, the Green Mill, and The Jazz Showcase. In 2011, Carrothers became an adjunct professor at Lawrence University in Wisconsin. In 2017, Carrothers began performing with the Copper Cats on The Red Jacket Jamboree.

== Accolades ==
Carrothers was awarded the Grand Prix du Disque for Jazz in 2004 and was nominated for the Les Victoires du Jazz (French Grammy Award equivalent) in 2005 and 2011.

== Discography ==
=== As leader ===
Year recorded	Title	Label	Notes
1987?	The Artful Dodger	Bridge Boy	
1993	Ye Who Enter Here	Bridge Boy	A Band in All Hope, with Anton Denner (alto sax, flute), Bill Stewart (percussion)
1998	The Blues and the Greys	Bridge Boy	Solo piano
1995	After Hours, Vol. 4	Go Jazz	Trio, with Billy Peterson (bass), Kenny Horst (drums)
1999?	The Language of Crows	Bridge Boy	Duo, co-led with Wendy Lewis (vocals)
1999	Duets with Bill Stewart	Dreyfus	Duo, with Bill Stewart (drums)
2000	Swing Sing Songs	Warner Bros.	Trio, with Nicolas Thys (bass), Dre Pallemaerts (drums)
2001	The Electric Bill	Dreyfus	With Michael Lewis (tenor sax, soprano sax), Reid Anderson (acoustic bass, electric bass), Dave King (drums)
2002	Ghost Ships	Sketch	Trio, with Anton Denner (soprano sax, alto sax, tenor sax), Bill Stewart (drums)
2003	Armistice 1918	Sketch	With Mark Henderson (contrabass bass clarinet), Matt Turner (cello), Drew Gress (bass), Bill Stewart (drums), Jay Epstein (percussion), Peg Carrothers and Knob St Choir (vocals)
2003–04	Shine Ball	Fresh Sound New Talent	Trio, with Gordon Johnson (bass), Dave King (drums)
2004	I Love Paris	Pirouet	Trio, with Nicolas Thys (bass), Dre Pallemaerts (drums)
2004	Civil War Diaries	Bridge Boy	Solo piano; in concert
2006	No Choice	Minium	
2006	Keep Your Sunny Side Up	Pirouet	Trio, with Ben Street (bass), Ari Hoenig (drums)
1992	Home Row	Pirouet	With Gary Peacock (bass), Bill Stewart (drums)
2008	Play Day	Bridge Boy	With Jean-Marc Foltz (clarinet), Matt Turner (cello), Jean-Philippe Viret (bass), Dre Pallemaerts (drums), Jay Epstein (percussion), Peg Carrothers (vocals)
2009	Apnea	Abeat	
2009	Joy Spring	Pirouet	Trio, with Drew Gress (bass), Bill Stewart (drums)
2009	A Night at the Village Vanguard	Pirouet	Trio, with Nicolas Thys (bass), Dre Pallemaerts (drums)
2010	Excelsior	Outnote	
2012	Castaways	Pirouet	Trio, with Drew Gress (bass), Dre Pallemaerts (drums)
2009	Family Life	Pirouet	Solo piano
2012	Sunday Morning	Vision Fugitive	
2012	Love and Longing	La Buissonne	

=== As sideman ===
- Brownmark, Just Like That (Motown, 1988)
- Scott Colley, Subliminal (Criss Cross, 1997)
- Dave Douglas, Moving Portrait (DIW, 1998)
- Happy Apple, Part of the Solutionproblem (No Alternative, Liberation Mob 1998)
- Gordon Johnson, Trios (Igmod, 1996)
- Dave King, I've Been Ringing You (Sunnyside, 2012)
- John McKenna, Apparition (Igmod, 1998)
- Andy Scherrer, Wrong Is Right (TCB, 2007)
- Andy Scherrer, Ornithology (Kelso, 2013)
- Bill Stewart, Snide Remarks (Blue Note, 1995)
- Bill Stewart, Telepathy (Blue Note, 1997)
- Bill Stewart, Space Squid (Pirouet, 2015)
- Ira Sullivan, After Hours (Go Jazz, 2000)
- Bobby Z., Bobby Z (Virgin, 1989)
- Kevin Brady, Common Ground (LRP Records, 2007)
- Kevin Brady, Zeitgeist (Fresh Sounds New Talent Records, 2009)
- Kevin Brady, Ensam (LRP Records,2016)
- Kevin Brady, Plan B (Ubuntu Music,2021)
