= Golden Valley Is Now =

Studio album by Reid Anderson, Dave King, and Craig Taborn
- Released: September 20, 2019
- Recorded: August 2018
- Genre: Jazz, electronic
- Length: 48:23
- Label: Intakt; CD 325
- Producer: Anja Illmaier, Craig Taborn, Dave King, Florian Keller, Intakt Records, Patrik Landolt, Reid Anderson

Craig Taborn chronology
The Transitory Poems (2019)	Golden Valley Is Now (2019)	Da'at (2019)

Golden Valley Is Now is an album by the group of the same name, featuring bassist Reid Anderson, drummer Dave King, and keyboardist Craig Taborn. It was recorded in August 2018 in Minneapolis and was released by Intakt Records on September 20, 2019.

The album title refers to the fact that all three musicians grew up in Golden Valley, Minnesota, and have played together on occasion since high school.

== Reception ==
Professional ratings
Review scores
Source	Rating
AllMusic	3.5/5 stars
Jazzwise	4/5 stars

In a review for AllMusic, Thom Jurek called the album "lovely," and wrote: "This date isn't about showing musical muscle; it's about composing, playing, and arranging songs -- simple instrumental ones -- with creativity and panache. This trio accomplish that with rawness, immediacy, collective good will, and a wacky kind of elegance."

Kevin Le Gendre of Jazzwise stated: "With influences spanning the more cultured end of 1990s synth-pop and sophisticated, orchestral electronica... the music carries the kind of sheen and shimmer one would attribute to any artists with a deep interest in both analogue and digital technology. Beyond the rich textural palette created... there is a thread of intense melancholy running through the material."

Writing for Jazz Times, A. D. Amorosi noted the album's "rainbow of surprisingly subtle colors and shadings," and praised the "manic propulsion" of "High Waist Drifter," with its "rapid-fire cymbal attack, party-ball handclapping, and Taborn's cheesy garage-band organ."

In an article for the Los Angeles Review of Books, Dan DiPiero described the recording as "a beguiling album of intricate, nuanced, melancholic pop songs performed by three master improvisers, and featuring almost no identifiable improvisations whatsoever."

== Track listings ==
No.	Title	Writer(s)	Length
1.	"City Diamond"	Reid Anderson	5:54
2.	"Sparklers and Snakes"	David King	3:57
3.	"Song One"	Anderson	7:42
4.	"This Is Nothing"	Anderson	6:28
5.	"High Waist Driver"	King	2:47
6.	"Polar Heroes"	Anderson	4:28
7.	"You Might Live Here"	Anderson	5:37
8.	"Solar Barges"	King	5:09
9.	"Hwy 1000"	Anderson	4:14
10.	"The End of the World"	Anderson	2:07

== Personnel ==
- Craig Taborn – synthesizers, electric piano, acoustic piano
- Reid Anderson – electric bass, electronics
- Dave King – drums, electronic drums
