= Prog (album) =

Studio album by The Bad Plus
- Released: 8 May 2007
- Recorded: September 2006
- Studio: Pachyderm Studio, Cannon Falls, Minnesota
- Genre: Jazz
- Length: 64:52
- Label: Heads Up
- Producer: Tony Platt, The Bad Plus

The Bad Plus chronology
Suspicious Activity? (2005)	Prog (2007)	For All I Care (2008)

Professional ratings
Aggregate scores
Source	Rating
Metacritic	80/100
Review scores
Source	Rating
All About Jazz	5/5 stars
AllMusic	4/5 stars
The Guardian	3/5 stars
PopMatters	8/10
The Penguin Guide to Jazz Recordings	3/4 stars

Prog is the fifth studio album recorded by American jazz trio The Bad Plus. Like previous Bad Plus recordings, Prog features several covers including "Everybody Wants to Rule the World" by Tears for Fears, "Life on Mars?" by David Bowie, and "Tom Sawyer" by Rush. It was released on 8 May 2007 by Heads Up label to positive critical reception.

== Reception ==
At Metacritic, that assigns a normalized rating out of 100 to reviews from mainstream critics, the album received an average score of 80, based on eight critical reviews, which indicates "universal acclaim".

Amar Patel in his review for BBC stated, "Rather than pondering motives for choosing such covers – “is it irony… is it sincerity or is it a mid-life crisis?” – let’s accept Prog for what it is: a free-spirited and fun excursion into the dynamic of the trio format by a twenty-year-old highly literate band of ‘gypsies’... By no means glamorous or gimmicky, but certainly invested with the cinematic scope and epic proportions of 70’s rock (take a bow Tony Platt), Prog is The Bad Plus more live and intuitive than ever." Evan Sawdey of PopMatters wrote, "...the Bad Plus return with Prog, and they burst out of the gate like they have nothing to lose. Naturally, people will want to know what crazy covers the band does this time around, and here the Plus does not disappoint."

Troy Collins of All About Jazz gave the album five stars out of five, commenting, "Coming into their own as both deft interpreters and singular writers, the members of The Bad Plus stand tall among their peers. With muscular conviction and steely focus, Prog is the sound of a much heralded ensemble rising to the occasion and fulfilling the hype." John Fordham of The Guardian wrote, "...now they're back on the street, raising a loan to finance this uneven but typically engaging album on its own label."

== Track listing ==
No.	Title	Writer(s)	Length
1.	"Everybody Wants to Rule the World"	Chris Hughes, Roland Orzabal, Ian Stanley	5:34
2.	"Physical Cities"	Reid Anderson	9:08
3.	"Life on Mars?"	David Bowie	6:02
4.	"Mint"	Ethan Iverson	5:20
5.	"Giant"	Anderson	8:44
6.	"Thriftstore Jewelry"	David King	5:36
7.	"Tom Sawyer"	Pye Dubois, Geddy Lee, Alex Lifeson, Neil Peart	5:10
8.	"This Guy's in Love with You"	Burt Bacharach, Hal David	4:43
9.	"The World is the Same"	Anderson	9:08
10.	"1980 World Champion"	King	5:03

iTunes bonus track
No.	Title	Writer(s)	Length
11.	"Narc"	Paul Banks, Daniel Kessler, Carlos Dengler, Sam Fogarino	6:43

== Personnel ==
- Reid Anderson – bass
- David King – drums
- Ethan Iverson – piano
