= It's Hard (The Bad Plus album) =

Studio album by The Bad Plus
- Released: August 26, 2016
- Recorded: April 2016
- Studio: Brooklyn Recording, NYC
- Genre: Jazz
- Length: 48:56
- Label: Okeh Records
- Producer: The Bad Plus

The Bad Plus chronology
The Bad Plus Joshua Redman (2015)	It's Hard (2016)	Never Stop II (2018)

Professional ratings
Review scores
Source	Rating
AllMusic	4/5 stars
PopMatters	6/10

It's Hard is a 2016 studio album by American jazz trio The Bad Plus released by Okeh Records label. It is the group's twelfth studio album, and contains only covers. AllMusic selected it as one of their Favorite Jazz Albums of 2016.

== Reception ==
In his review for PopMatters John Garratt stated, "Though they remain a vital game piece in the modern jazz chessboard, an album like It's Hard won't help them zoom to the other side." Steve Greenlee of JazzTimes wrote "After a few albums of original music and a reworking of Stravinsky’s “The Rite of Spring,” the Bad Plus returns to its roots on It’s Hard. The trio, which mainstreamed the practice of turning modern pop songs into modern jazz, covers a wide swath of stylistic terrain on these 11 tracks..." Richard Gehr of Relix added "After four albums of original music, the Plus returns to Plan A with It’s Hard, an album of sensationally reimagined material like Cyndi Lauper’s “Time After Time,” Kraftwerk’s “The Robots” and Peter Gabriel’s “Games Without Frontiers.” Rather than merely soloing over changes, the trio refracts the originals through their own colorful, sonic kaleidoscope." Bobby Reed of DownBeat added, "This all-acoustic, all-covers program finds the trio (pianist Ethan Iverson, bassist Reid Anderson and drummer Dave King) playing to its strengths as perpetually intellectual yet mischievous musicians." Patrick Jarenwattananon of NPR wrote, "After more than a dozen years spent touring the world, The Bad Plus' covers gambit seems much less like thirst for provocation than hunger for adventure."

== Track listing ==
No.	Title	Writer(s)	Length
1.	"Maps"	Brian Chase, Karen Lee Orzolek, Nick Zinner	4:21
2.	"Games Without Frontiers"	Peter Gabriel	4:19
3.	"Time After Time"	Cyndi Lauper, Rob Hyman	6:14
4.	"I Walk The Line"	Johnny Cash	3:18
5.	"Alfombra Magica"	Bill McHenry	4:07
6.	"The Beautiful Ones"	Prince	3:32
7.	"Don't Dream It's Over"	Neil Finn	5:21
8.	"Staring At The Sun"	Tunde Adebimpe, David Andrew Sitek	4:27
9.	"Mandy"	Scott English, Richard Kerr	6:13
10.	"The Robots"	Florian Schneider, Karl Bartos, Ralf Hütter	3:30
11.	"Broken Shadows"	Ornette Coleman	3:32
Total length:			48:56

== Personnel ==
- Reid Anderson – bass
- Ethan Iverson – piano
- David King – drums
