= James Diers =

American writer and musician

James Diers is an American writer and musician in Minneapolis, Minnesota. He is a founding member of the bands Halloween, Alaska and Love-cars. (He collaborates with drummer and composer David King in both groups.) He is known for writing literate, thought-provoking lyrics in a modern indie rock context. Diers attended Northwestern University in Evanston, Illinois and the University of Sussex in England.

== Discography ==
=== with Halloween, Alaska ===
==== Albums ====
- Le Centre, 2018
- All Night the Calls Came In, 2011 (voice/guitar/production)
- Champagne Downtown, 2009 (voice/guitar/keys/production)
- Too Tall to Hide, 2005 (voice/guitar/keys/production)
- Halloween, Alaska, 2004 (voice/guitar/production)

==== EPs ====
- Liberties, 2013 (voice/keyboards/guitar)

==== Appearances ====
- Twin Town High Music Yearbook Vol. 8, 2007
- For Callum, 2007
- Live Current Vol. 1, 2005

=== with Love-Cars ===
==== Albums ====
- Thank You For Telling Me What I Already Know, 2002 (voice/guitar/keys)
- I'm Friends With All Stars, 2000 (voice/guitar)
- Chump Lessons, 1998 (voice/guitar)

==== Appearances ====
- Twin Town Music Yearbook Vol. 4, 2001
- Twin Town Music Yearbook Vol. 2, 1998

=== Other contributions ===
- JG Everest, Parade, 2008 (voice/guitar)
- Fat Kid Wednesdays, The Art of Cherry, 2005 (voice on "All Thru the Night")
- 12 Rods, Lost Time, 2002 (additional voice)
