= Champagne Downtown =

Studio album by Halloween, Alaska
- Released: April 7, 2009
- Studio: Integral Studio in St. Paul, Minnesota
- Genres: Post-rock, indie rock, experimental rock, indietronica, electronic rock
- Length: 44:32
- Labels: Halloween, Alaska / East Side Digital

Halloween, Alaska chronology
Too Tall to Hide (2005)	Champagne Downtown (2009)	Occasion: Remixes (2009)

Champagne Downtown is the third studio album by the Minnesota indie rock band Halloween, Alaska. It was released on April 7, 2009, on enhanced CD and via online distributors such as iTunes and Amazon MP3.

In the enhanced CD release, the band included instrumental versions of the entire album in MP3 format.

In the song "In Order," the band deliberately censored the phrase "f--- the Third Eye" around 1:46. The awkward execution, also besides the fact the entire mix was censored rather than solely the voice track, led many fans to initially believe the bleeping out was unnecessary and forced by either their label or their families. However, the band has expressed that this was an intentional edit; after hearing both the censored and uncensored version of the song, they decided they liked the "old school" sound of the censored version and decided to keep it.

== Track listing ==
All tracks are listed as being written by Halloween, Alaska.

However, it has been expressed in interviews that lead singer James Diers is the primary lyricist for the band, with additional contributions from drummer David King.

No.	Title	Length
1.	"Hot Pink"	5:51
2.	"In Order"	4:58
3.	"The Ends"	3:17
4.	"Gone with the Wind"	4:41
5.	"The Hollywood Sign"	3:45
6.	"Champagne Downtown"	4:39
7.	"Un-American"	3:41
8.	"Be a Man"	4:30
9.	"Hurry Up"	4:52
10.	"Knights of Columbus"	4:22
Total length:		44:32
