= The Purity of the Turf (album) =

Studio album by Ethan Iverson
- Released: September 16, 2016
- Recorded: February 22, 2016
- Studios: Systems Two Recording Studios, Brooklyn, NY
- Genre: Jazz
- Length: 58:40
- Labels: Criss Cross Jazz; Criss 1391 CD
- Producer: Gerry Teekens

Ethan Iverson chronology
Costumes Are Mandatory (2013)	The Purity of the Turf (2016)	Temporary Kings (2017)

The Purity of the Turf is a studio album led by American jazz pianist Ethan Iverson. The album was recorded in 2016 and released by the Criss Cross Jazz label on September 16, 2016.

== Reception ==
Professional ratings
Review scores
Source	Rating
The Guardian	4/5 stars
DownBeat	4/5 stars

The Guardian's John Fordham called it "An album of delightfully rugged character, as might be expected from the lineup". DownBeat reviewer Bob Doerschuk said "all three musicians conspire to create a landmark session, one that targets both the visceral pleasures of swing and more cerebral levels of appreciation". In his article for JazzTimes, Michael J. West wrote, "the fun of listening to The Purity of the Turf is in the anticipation of Iverson throwing such wrenches into the works ... The album’s repertoire of standards and how he reorients them toward his own twisty concept comprise its considerable pleasure".

== Track listing ==
1. "The Purity of the Turf" (Ethan Iverson) – 4:31
2. "Song for My Father" (Horace Silver) – 5:19
3. "Darn That Dream" (Jimmy Van Heusen, Eddie DeLange) – 4:43
4. "Along Came Betty" (Benny Golson) – 5:45
5. "Graduation Day" (Iverson) – 3:33
6. "Confirmation" (Charlie Parker) – 6:14
7. "Kush" (Nasheet Waits) – 5:35
8. "Sent for You Yesterday" (Count Basie, Eddie Durham) – 4:55
9. "Strange Serenade" (Andrew Hill) – 4:23
10. "Little Waltz" (Ron Carter) – 5:01
11. "Einbahnstrasse" (Carter) – 5:10
12. "So Hard It Hurts" (Annette Peacock) – 3:18

== Personnel ==
- Ethan Iverson − piano
- Ron Carter − bass
- Nasheet Waits - drums
