= Diers =

Diers is surname. It may be a German patronymic surname. Notable people with the surname include:

- Charles Diers (born 1981), French professional footballer
- Ines Diers (born 1963), German freestyle swimmer
- James Diers, American writer and musician
- Karl-Dietrich Diers (born 1953), German cyclist
- Michael Diers (born 1950), German art historian
- Paul Stumme-Diers (born 1960), American Evangelical Lutheran bishop
- Theodore C. Diers (1880–1942), American politician from Wyoming
- William H. Diers (1890–1982), American politician from Nebraska

== See also ==
- Dier
