= The Bad Plus (album) =

Studio album by The Bad Plus
- Released: August 1, 2001
- Recorded: December 28, 2000 at Creation Audio, Minneapolis, Minnesota, United States
- Genre: Jazz
- Length: 45:05
- Label: Fresh Sound New Talent
- Producer: The Bad Plus

The Bad Plus chronology
The Bad Plus (2001)	These Are The Vistas (2003)

Professional ratings
Review scores
Source	Rating
AllMusic	4/5 stars
The Penguin Guide to Jazz Recordings	4/4 stars

The Bad Plus (also known as Motel) is the first album released by The Bad Plus.

== Background ==
It contains covers of ABBA's "Knowing Me, Knowing You," Rodgers and Hart's 1934 classic "Blue Moon," and Nirvana's "Smells Like Teen Spirit." It was recorded on December 28, 2000, and released in 2001 on the Fresh Sound New Talent label.

== Track listing ==
No.	Title	Writer(s)	Length
1.	"Knowing Me, Knowing You"	ABBA	5:45
2.	"Blue Moon"	Richard Rodgers, Lorenz Hart	3:01
3.	"1972 Bronze Medalist"	David King	5:06
4.	"The Breakout"	Reid Anderson	5:22
5.	"Smells Like Teen Spirit"	Kurt Cobain, Dave Grohl, Krist Novoselic	6:32
6.	"Labyrinth"	Ethan Iverson	5:13
7.	"Scurry"	Iverson	5:22
8.	"Love Is the Answer"	Anderson	8:22

== Personnel ==
- Ethan Iverson – piano
- Reid Anderson – acoustic bass
- David King – drums
- Jordi Pujol – executive producer
