= Reid Anderson =

American bassist and composer

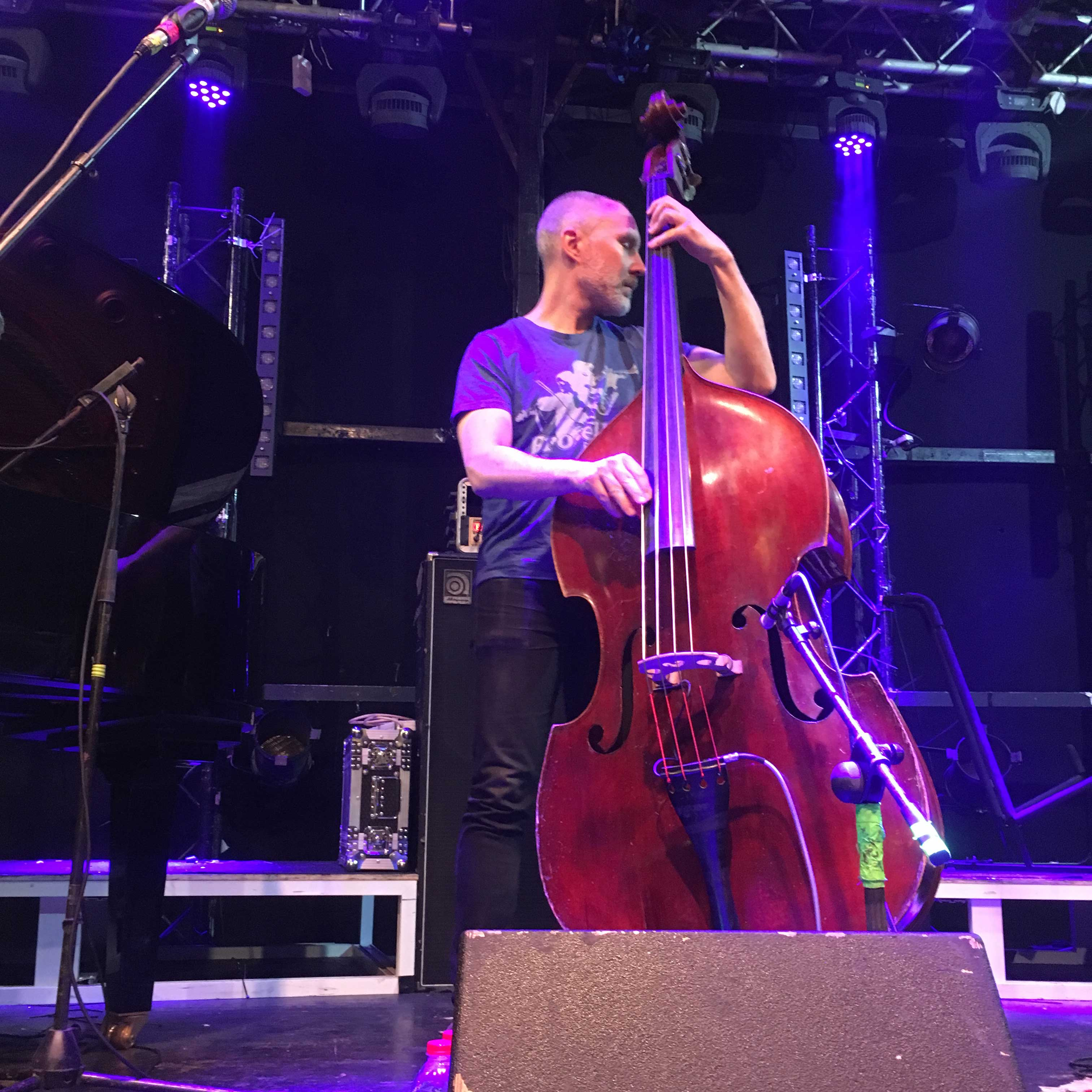
- Anderson w/ the Bad Plus 2019

Background information
- Born: October 15, 1970 (age 56); Minnesota, U.S.
- Genres: Jazz, avant-garde jazz
- Occupations: Musician, composer
- Instrument: Double bass
- Years active: 1980s–present
- Labels: Columbia, Fresh Sound
- Member of: The Bad Plus, Orange Then Blue

Reid Anderson (born 15 October 1970) is a bassist and composer from Minnesota. He is a member of The Bad Plus with drummer Dave King, saxophonist Chris Speed, and guitarist Ben Monder. The original lineup of The Bad Plus first played together in 1989 and formally established the band in 2000. Anderson attended the University of Wisconsin-Eau Claire and graduated from the Curtis Institute of Music.

== Discography ==
=== As leader ===
- Dirty Show Tunes (Fresh Sound, 1997)
- Abolish Bad Architecture (Fresh Sound, 1999)
- The Vastness of Space (Fresh Sound, 2000)

With The Bad Plus

- The Bad Plus (Fresh Sound, 2001)
- These Are the Vistas (Columbia, 2003)
- Give (Columbia, 2004)
- Blunt Object: Live in Tokyo (Sony, 2005)
- Suspicious Activity? (Columbia, 2005)
- Prog (Heads Up, 2007)
- For All I Care (Heads Up, 2009)
- Never Stop (eOne/EmArcy, 2010)
- Made Possible (eOne, 2012)
- The Rite of Spring (Masterworks, 2014)
- Inevitable Western (Okeh, 2014)
- The Bad Plus Joshua Redman (Nonesuch, 2015)
- It's Hard (Okeh, 2016)
- Never Stop II (Legbreaker, 2018)
- Activate Infinity (Edition, 2019)
- The Bad Plus. (Edition, 2022)
- Complex Emotions (Edition, 2024)

With David King and Craig Taborn

- Golden Valley Is Now (Intakt, 2019)

With Tim Berne, Chris Speed, and David King

- Broken Shadows (Newvelle, 2019)
- Broken Shadows Live (Screwgun, 2020)

=== As sideman ===
With Ethan Iverson

- Construction Zone (Originals) (Fresh Sound, 1998)
- Deconstruction Zone (Standards) (Fresh Sound, 1998)
- The Minor Passions (Fresh Sound, 1999)
- Live at Smalls (Fresh Sound, 2000)

With Bill McHenry

- Graphic (Fresh Sound, 1999)
- Bill McHenry Quartet featuring Paul Motian (Fresh Sound, 2003)
- Roses (Sunnyside, 2007)
- Ghosts of the Sun (Sunnyside, 2011)

With Orrin Evans

- Listen to the Band (Criss Cross, 1999)
- Live at Widener University (Imani, 2004)

With others

- Jeff Ballard, Fairgrounds (Edition, 2019)
- Phil Bancroft, Headlong (Caber, 2004)
- Till Bronner, German Songs (Minor Music, 1996)
- Uri Caine, The Goldberg Variations (Winter & Winter 2000)
- Bill Carrothers, The Electric Bill (Dreyfus, 2002)
- Gerald Cleaver, Adjust (Fresh Sound, 2001)
- Jamie Cullum, In the Mind of Jamie Cullum (District 6, 2007)
- Fred Hersch, Songs Without Words (2001)
- Donna Lewis, Brand New Day (Palmetto, 2015)
- Orange Then Blue, Hold the Elevator (GM, 1999)
- Tom Rogerson, Tom Rogerson (Yonasty, 2005)
- Mark Turner, Dharma Days (Warner Bros., 2001)
- Ben Waltzer, For Good (Fresh Sound, 1996)
- Patrick Zimmerli, Twelve Sacred Dances (Arabesque, 1998)
