= Ethan Iverson =

American pianist, composer, and critic

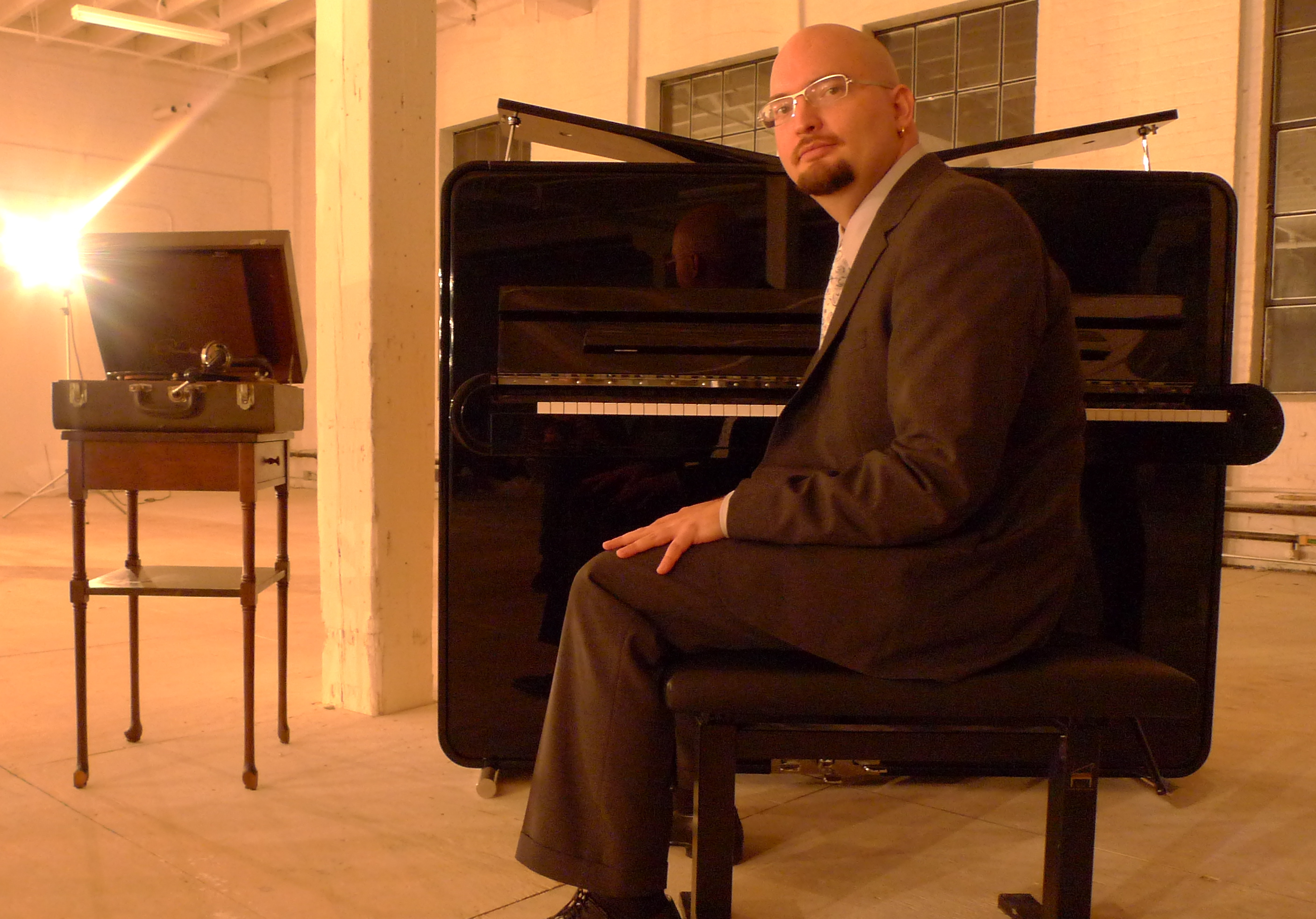
- Iverson in 2009

Background information
- Born: February 11, 1973 (age 53); Menomonie, Wisconsin, U.S.
- Genres: Jazz, avant-garde jazz
- Occupation: Musician
- Instrument: Piano
- Labels: Fresh Sound, Sunnyside, HighNote, Criss Cross, ECM
- Website: www.ethaniverson.com

Ethan Iverson (born February 11, 1973) is a pianist, composer, and critic who was part of the avant-garde jazz trio The Bad Plus with bassist Reid Anderson and drummer Dave King.

== Biography ==
Iverson was born in Menomonie, Wisconsin. Before forming The Bad Plus, he was musical director of the Mark Morris Dance Group and a student of Fred Hersch and Sophia Rosoff. He has worked with artists such as Billy Hart, Kurt Rosenwinkel, Tim Berne, Mark Turner, Ben Street, Lee Konitz, Albert "Tootie" Heath, Paul Motian, Larry Grenadier, Charlie Haden and Ron Carter. He currently studies with John Bloomfield and is on the faculty of the New England Conservatory.

In 2017, the Bad Plus announced that Iverson was leaving the group, to be replaced by Orrin Evans. Also in 2017, the Mark Morris Dance Group premiered Pepperland, for which Iverson composed the score (derived from parts of the Beatles' Sgt. Pepper's Lonely Hearts Club Band) and led the band during performances. Iverson then became the group's music director for five years.

In 2018, Iverson premiered his Concerto to Scale with the American Composers Orchestra; released the album Temporary Kings with saxophonist Mark Turner on the ECM label; and toured Europe with the Billy Hart Quartet.

In 2019, Iverson and trumpeter Tom Harrell released the album Common Practice, recorded at the Village Vanguard, on ECM. Iverson also served as an artistic director of the 2019 Jazz te Gast festival in the Netherlands, at which his orchestral piece Solve for X premiered.

In 2021, Iverson's album Bud Powell in the 21st Century, featuring Ingrid Jensen, Dayna Stephens, Ben Street, Lewis Nash, and the Umbria Jazz Orchestra, was released on Sunnyside Records.

2022 saw the release of Iverson's first record for Blue Note, Every Note is True, with Larry Grenadier and Jack DeJohnette. The album contains mostly Iverson originals for trio, plus DeJohnette's "Blue" and Iverson's song "The More It Changes" for 44-person socially distanced choir.

In 2024, Iverson released Technically Acceptable and another foray into classical music, Playfair Sonatas.

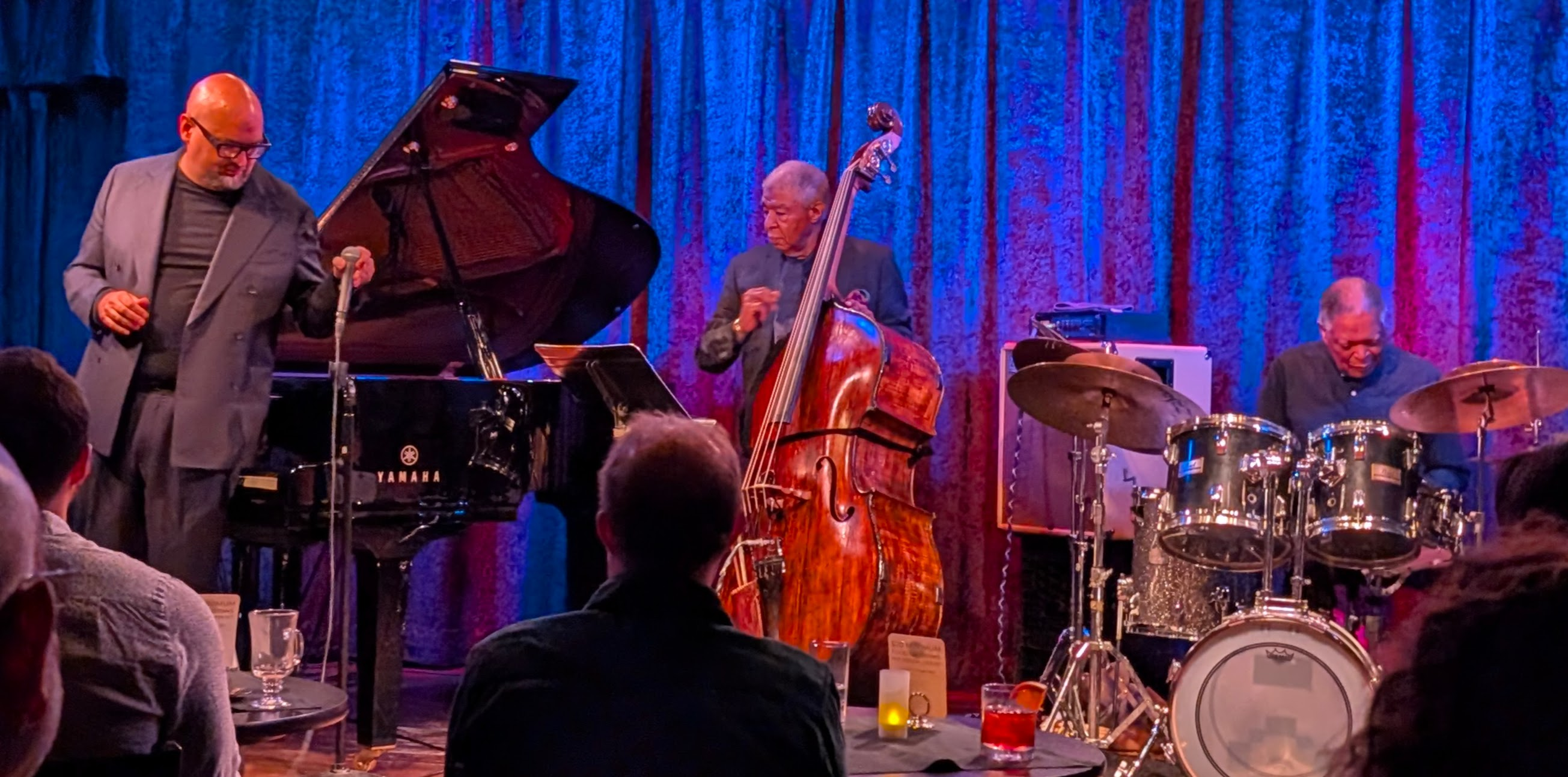
Iverson at Birdland in 2025 with Billy Hart on drums and Buster Williams on bass.

Iverson is an active live performer who often plays in New York, as a lead, sideman, or organizer. He frequently performs with Buster Williams, Billy Hart, and Ron Carter.

=== Other work ===
Iverson also writes about music and music-related topics and has been published by The New Yorker, NPR, and The Nation, as well as his substack Transitional Technology.

An aficionado of crime writing, Iverson is an expert in the works of Donald E. Westlake, and was friends with the writer. After Westlake's death, Iverson wrote an extensive essay reviewing almost all of Westlake's more than 100 books. He assisted editor Levi Stahl in assembling Westlake's posthumous collection The Getaway Car.

== Discography ==
=== As leader ===
Year recorded	Title	Label	Notes
1993	School Work	Mons	Some tracks trio, with Johannes Weidenmueller (bass), Falk Willis (drums); some tracks quartet, with Dewey Redman (tenor sax) added
1998	Construction Zone (Originals)	Fresh Sound New Talent	Trio, with Reid Anderson (bass), Jorge Rossy (drums)
1998	Deconstruction Zone (Standards)	Fresh Sound New Talent	Trio, with Reid Anderson (bass), Jorge Rossy (drums)
1999	The Minor Passions	Fresh Sound New Talent	Trio, with Reid Anderson (bass), Billy Hart (drums)
2000	Live at Smalls	Fresh Sound New Talent	Quartet, with Bill McHenry (tenor sax), Reid Anderson (bass), Jeff Williams (drums); in concert
2012	Costumes Are Mandatory	HighNote	Most tracks quartet, with Lee Konitz (alto sax), Larry Grenadier (bass), Jorge Rossy (drums); some tracks trio, duo, solo
2016	The Purity of the Turf	Criss Cross	Most tracks trio, with Ron Carter (bass), Nasheet Waits (drums); one track solo piano
2017	Temporary Kings	ECM	Duo, with Mark Turner (tenor sax)
2017	Common Practice	ECM	Quartet, with Tom Harrell (trumpet), Ben Street (bass), Eric McPherson (drums)
2018	Bud Powell in the 21st Century	Sunnyside	With the Umbria Jazz Orchestra plus quintet with Dayna Stephens (tenor sax), Ingrid Jensen (trumpet), Ben Street (bass), Lewis Nash (drums)
2021	Every Note Is True	Blue Note	Trio, with Larry Grenadier (bass), Jack DeJohnette (drums)
2024	Technically Acceptable	Blue Note	Trios with Thomas Morgan/Kush Abadey and Simón Willson/Vinnie Sperrazza
2024	Playfair Sonatas	Urlicht AudioVisual	Six sonatas composed by Iverson for six different instruments and piano

With The Bad Plus

- The Bad Plus (2001)
- Authorized Bootleg: New York 12/16/01 (2002)
- These Are the Vistas (2003)
- Give (2004)
- Blunt Object: Live in Tokyo (1999)
- Suspicious Activity? (2005)
- Prog (2007)
- For All I Care (2008 Europe, 2009 North America)
- Never Stop (2010)
- Made Possible (2012)
- The Rite of Spring (2014)
- Inevitable Western (2014)
- The Bad Plus Joshua Redman (2015)
- It's Hard (2016)

=== As sideman ===
With Albert Heath

- Live at Small's (SmallsLive, 2010)
- Tootie's Tempo (Sunnyside, 2013)
- Philadelphia Beat (Sunnyside, 2015)

With Billy Hart

- Billy Hart Quartet (HighNote, 2006)
- All Our Reasons (ECM 2012)
- One Is the Other (ECM, 2014)
- Multidirectional (Smoke Sessions, 2023)

With Buffalo Collision (incl. Tim Berne, Hank Roberts, David King)

- Duck (2008)

With Chris Cheek, Ben Street, and Jorge Rossy

- Live at the Jamboree: Guilty (Fresh Sound, 2002)
- Live at the Jamboree: Lazy Afternoon (Fresh Sound, 2002)

With Avantango (Thomas Chapin and Pablo Aslan)

- Y en el 2000 Tambien... (EPSA Music, Argentina)

With Patrick Zimmerli

- Twelve Sacred Dances (1998)
- Clockworks (2018)

== Personal life ==
Iverson lives in Brooklyn, New York, with his wife, the writer Sarah Deming.
