= The Bad Plus =

American jazz group

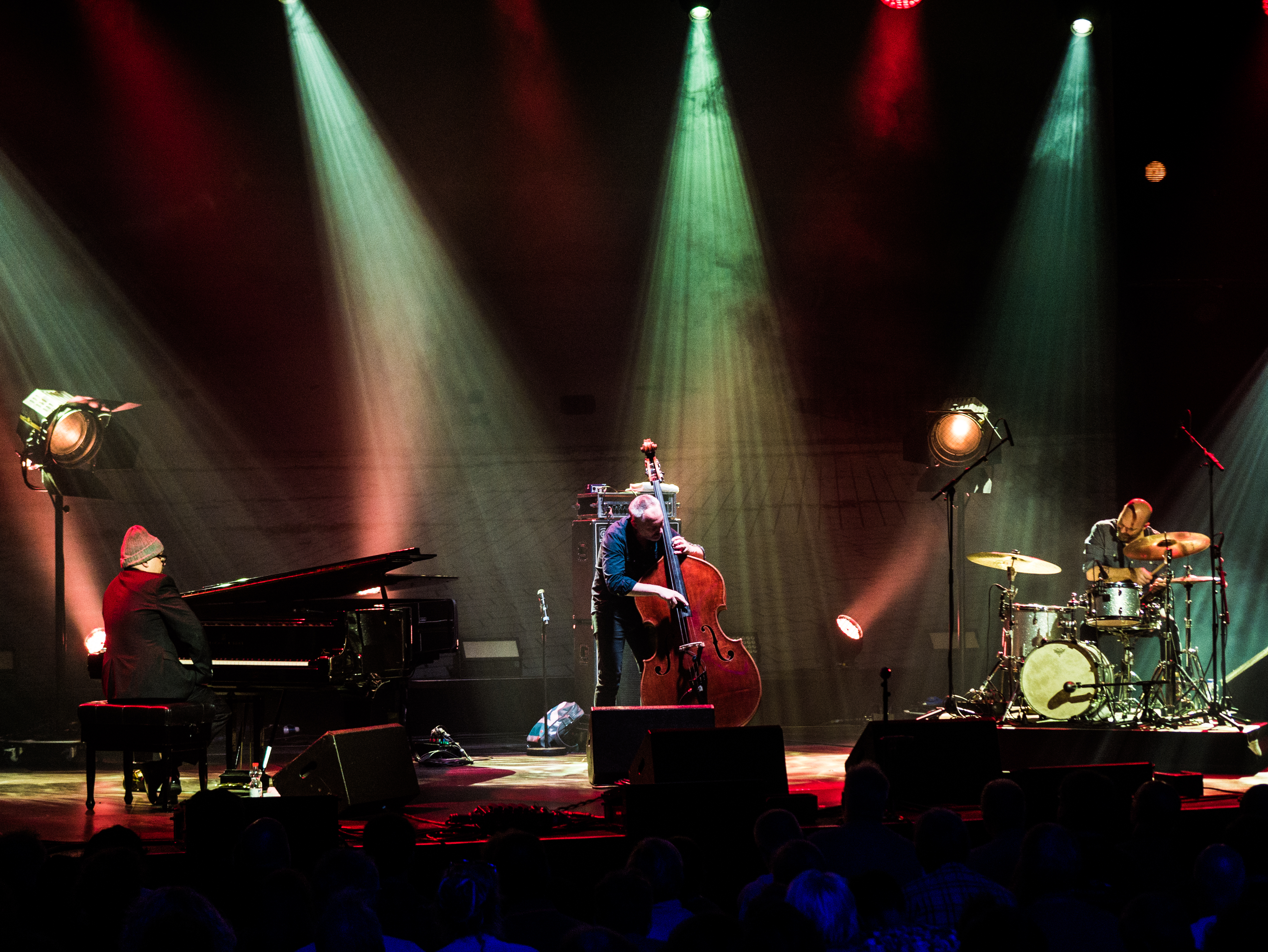
- The Bad Plus (Ethan Iverson, Reid Anderson, David King) at the Moers Festival 2017

Background information
- Origin: Minneapolis, Minnesota, U.S.
- Genres: Jazz, avant-garde jazz
- Years active: 2000–present
- Labels: HUI, Universal, Do the Math, Mack Avenue Records
- Members: Reid Anderson; David King; Ben Monder; Chris Speed
- Past members: Ethan Iverson; Orrin Evans
- Website: www.thebadplus.com

The Bad Plus is an American jazz group from Minneapolis, Minnesota, United States, formed in 2000. They were originally a piano trio, but became a quartet in 2021: founding members Reid Anderson on bass and David King on drums, as well as guitarist Ben Monder and tenor saxophonist Chris Speed.

== History ==
Ethan Iverson, Reid Anderson and David King first played together in 1989 but established The Bad Plus in 2000. The band recorded their first album, a self-titled effort released on Fresh Sound, after playing only three gigs together.

A live performance at the Village Vanguard was heard by Columbia Records representative Yves Beauvais, and the band was signed to Columbia in 2002. Their major label debut album, These Are the Vistas, was released in 2003. This was followed by Give in 2004 and Suspicious Activity? in 2005.

After parting ways with Columbia, the group signed to Heads Up Records (a division of Telarc), and released the album Prog in 2007. In early Spring of 2008 they finished recording their next studio album, For All I Care, which features vocalist Wendy Lewis. It was released in autumn 2008 in Europe and in spring 2009 in the US. Their album Never Stop was released in September 2010.

The trio served as artists in residence at Duke University in 2010 and 2011. On March 24, 2011, they premiered their version of Igor Stravinsky's "The Rite of Spring" at Duke's Reynolds Theater.

In 2014 a concert at the Village Vanguard in New York was recorded on video and published on YouTube.

On April 10, 2017, the band released a statement that Ethan Iverson would part ways with the band at the end of 2017, with Orrin Evans replacing him on piano starting January 1, 2018.

On March 13, 2021, the band posted news on social media that Orrin Evans would be leaving the band to "pursue the music under his own name and will be closing his chapter with The Bad Plus." They noted that the band would no longer be a "piano trio (for now, at least)" and that "they are looking forward to expanding the ensemble as they work on creating music for their next record."

In August 2021, the band revealed a new lineup featuring guitarist Ben Monder and tenor saxophonist Chris Speed. They released a new album, entitled simply The Bad Plus, on September 30, 2022.

On January 12, 2026, Anderson and King posted a Facebook reel announcing that the Bad Plus would be disbanding by the end of the year. In March and April 2026 Anderson and King toured with saxophonist Chris Potter and keyboardist Craig Taborn as "The Bad Plus Chris Potter and Craig Taborn."

== Artistry ==
The trio's music combines elements of modern avant-garde jazz with rock and pop influences. The band have recorded versions of songs by Nirvana, Aphex Twin, Blondie, Peter Gabriel, Pink Floyd, Ornette Coleman, Pixies, Rush, Tears for Fears, Neil Young, David Bowie, Yes, Interpol, The Flaming Lips, Johnny Cash, The Bee Gees, Burt Bacharach, Cyndi Lauper and Black Sabbath. Blunt Object: Live in Tokyo includes a cover of Queen's "We Are the Champions" along with the jazz standard "My Funny Valentine". Suspicious Activity? contains a cover of the theme from "Chariots of Fire", while a version of "Karma Police" by Radiohead appeared on the 2006 album Exit Music: Songs with Radio Heads. The band has said that they changed their sound a little bit for their sixth album, For All I Care.

== Discography ==
=== Albums with Ethan Iverson ===
- The Bad Plus (Fresh Sound New Talent, 2001)
- Authorized Bootleg: New York 12/16/01 (Self-Released, 2002)
- These Are the Vistas (Columbia, 2003)
- Give (Columbia, 2004)
- Blunt Object: Live in Tokyo (Sony, 2005)
- Suspicious Activity? (Columbia, 2005)
- Prog (EmArcy, 2007)
- For All I Care (EmArcy, 2008 Europe, 2009 North America)
- Never Stop (EmArcy, 2010)
- Made Possible (EmArcy, 2012)
- The Rite of Spring (Masterworks, 2014)
- Inevitable Western (Okeh, 2014)
- The Bad Plus Joshua Redman (Nonesuch, 2015)
- It's Hard (Okeh, 2016)

=== Albums with Orrin Evans ===
- Never Stop II (Legbreaker, 2018)
- Activate Infinity (Edition, 2019)

=== Albums with Chris Speed and Ben Monder ===
- The Bad Plus (Edition, 2022)
- Complex Emotions (Edition, 2024)

=== Compilation appearances ===
- Exit Music: Songs with Radio Heads (2006, Rapster/Barely Breaking Even) – "Karma Police"
- Everybody Wants to Be a Cat: Disney Jazz Volume 1 (2011) – "Gaston"
- Everybody Wants to Be a Cat: Disney Jazz Volume 2 (2021) – "Love"
