= David King (drummer) =

American drummer

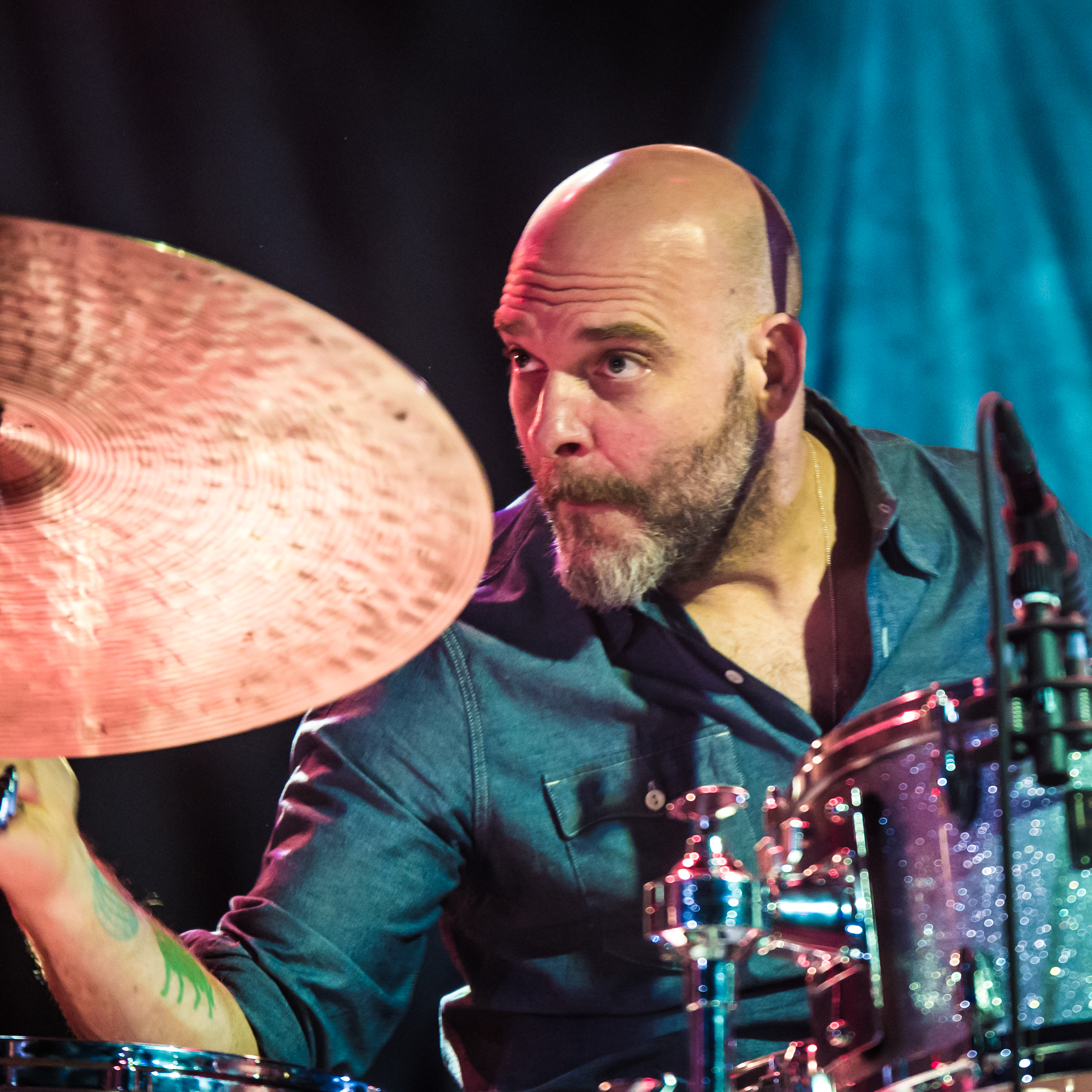
- Dave King at the Moers Festival, 2017

Background information
- Born: June 8, 1970 (age 56); Minneapolis, Minnesota, U.S.
- Genres: Jazz
- Occupations: Musician, composer
- Instrument: Drums
- Label: Sunnyside
- Member of: The Bad Plus; Happy Apple; Halloween, Alaska; Dave King Trucking Company; Buffalo Collision; The Gang Font

David King (born June 8, 1970) is an American drummer from Minneapolis. He is known for being a founding member of the jazz groups The Bad Plus (with Reid Anderson) and Happy Apple (with Michael Lewis and Erik Fratzke). King is also active in many other projects including free jazz collective Buffalo Collision with NYC "downtown" musicians Tim Berne and Hank Roberts and the electronic art/pop group Halloween, Alaska. He is also a member of the noise/prog band The Gang Font with former Hüsker Dü bassist Greg Norton. He also has a jazz quintet called Dave King Trucking Company.

== Career ==
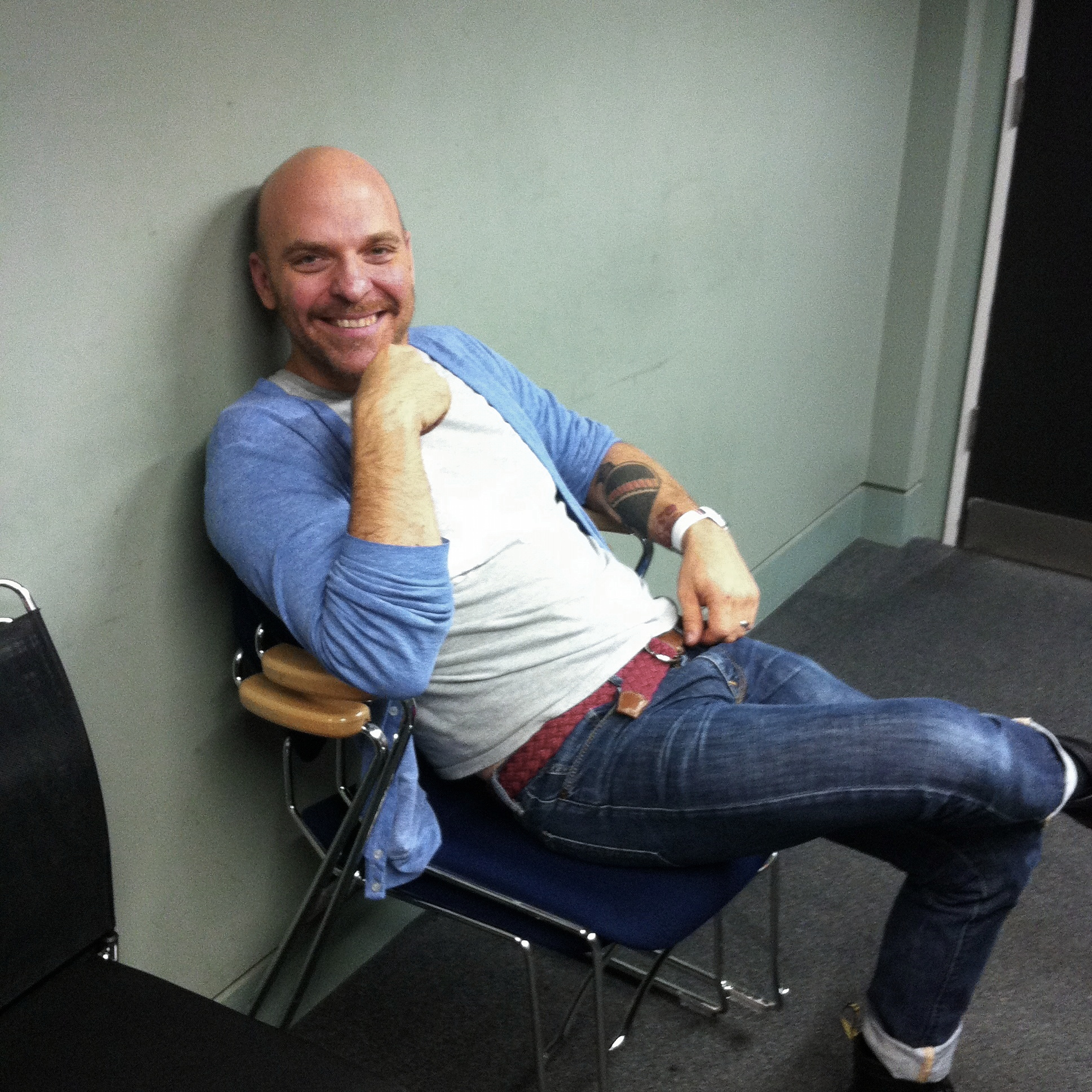
King in 2012

King has recorded or performed with Bill Frisell, Joshua Redman, Joe Lovano, Dewey Redman, Chris Speed, Ursus Minor (with Tony Hymas, Jef Lee Johnson, François Corneloup, Jeff Beck, Julian Lage, Boots Riley and Dead Prez), Joe 'Guido' Welsh, Viktor Krauss, Matt Maneri, Bill Carrothers, Anthony Cox, Atmosphere, Kurt Rosenwinkel, Benoît Delbecq, Django Bates, Meat Beat Manifesto, Craig Taborn's Junk Magic, Tchad Blake, Tony Platt, Mason Jennings, Haley Bonar, Wendy Lewis, Chris Morissey, Jim Mcneely and HR big band, Peter Lang, Craig Green and his high school big band among others.

King has also written and performed for modern dance with the Mark Morris Dance Group and for fashion, composing and performing live for three seasons of designer Isaac Mizrahi's fashion week shows at Bryant Park NYC and for film with the award winning animated shorts "Bike Ride Story" and "Bike Race" by Tom Schroeder. In March 2008 King appeared with The Bad Plus on the Late Night with Conan O'Brien television show playing one of King's compositions, "Thriftstore Jewelry".

In 2010 King released a solo record titled "Indelicate" on the Sunnyside label where the drummer plays duets with himself on piano aided by overdubbing in the studio.

In 2012 King released a trio record of standards featuring Bill Carrothers and Billy Peterson on Sunnyside Records titled "I'll Be Ringing You".

He has also released three records with The Dave King Trucking Co.: Good Old Light (2011), Adopted Highway (2014), Surrounded By The Night (2016) on Sunnyside Records.

King features in the documentary 'King for Two Days' which documents a two-night concert held at the Walker Art Center in Minneapolis, MN celebrating the music of Dave King and featuring performances by five of the bands he drums in. King for Two Days is an official selection for the 2012 Big Sky Documentary Film Festival.

He also hosts a one-hour all-jazz radio show "King's Speech" Sunday nights on Minnesota Public Radio's KCMP, and a YouTube web series called "Rational Funk".

== Discography ==
=== As Leader ===
Solo

- Indelicate (2010)
- OK Piano (2025)

with Bill Carrothers and Billy Peterson

- I've Been Ringing You (2012)

with Dave King Trucking Company

- Good Old Light (2011)
- Adopted Highway (2013)
- Surrounded By The Night (2016)
- Old TV (2023)

=== As Co-leader ===
with Happy Apple

- Blown Shockwaves & Crash Flow (1997)
- Part Of The Solutionproblem (1998)
- Body Popping Moon Walking Top Rocking (1999)
- Jazzercise With The Elders/E Equals What I Says It Does/God Bless Certain Portions of the USA (2000)
- Please Refrain From Fronting (2001)
- Youth Oriented (2003)
- The Peace Between Our Companies (2004 Europe, 2005 North America)
- Happy Apple Back On Top (2007)
- New York CD (2020 digital, 2024 CD/Vinyl)

with The Bad Plus

- The Bad Plus (2001)
- Authorized Bootleg: New York 12/16/01 (2002)
- These Are the Vistas (2003)
- Give (2004)
- Blunt Object: Live in Tokyo (2005)
- Suspicious Activity? (2005)
- Prog (2007)
- For All I Care (2008 Europe, 2009 North America)
- Never Stop (2010)
- Made Possible (2012)
- The Rite Of Spring (2014)
- Inevitable Western (2014)
- The Bad Plus Joshua Redman (2015)
- It's Hard (2016)
- Never Stop II (2018)
- Activate Infinity (2019)
- The Bad Plus. (2022)
- Complex Emotions (2024)

with Reid Anderson and Craig Taborn

- Golden Valley Is Now (2019)

with The Gang Font

- The Gang Font feat. Interloper (2007)

with Vector Families

- For Those About To Jazz/Rock We Salute You (2017)

with Buffalo Collision

- (duck) (2008)

with Broken Shadows

- Broken Shadows (Vinyl 2019, CD/Digital 2021)
- Broken Shadows Live (2020)

with F*K*G

- Broken Drive-In Speakers (1998)

with Craig Green

- Craig Green + David King (2008)
- Moontower (2012)

with Love-Cars

- Chump Lessons (1998)
- I'm Friends With All Stars (2000)
- Thank You For Telling Me What I Already Know (2002)

with Halloween, Alaska

- Halloween, Alaska (2003)
- Too Tall To Hide (2005)
- Champagne Downtown (2009)
- All Night The Calls Came In (2011)
- Liberties (2013)
- Le Centre (2018)

=== As Sideman ===
with Chris Speed Trio

- Really OK (2014)
- Platinum On Tap (2017)
- Respect For Your Toughness (2019)
- Despite Obstacles (2023)

with Craig Taborn

- Junk Magic (2004)
- Daylight Ghosts (2017)
- Compass Confusion (2020)

with Julian Lage

- Love Hurts (2019)
- Squint (2021)
- View with a Room (2022)
- Layers (2023)
- Speak to Me (2024)

with Bill Carrothers

- The Electric Bill (2002)
- Shine Ball (2006)

with Chris Morrissey Quartet

- The Morning World (2009)

with Ursus Minor

- Zugzwang (2005)

with 12 Rods

- Separation Anxieties (2000)
- Lost Time (2002)

with Armen Nalbandian

- The Complex Relationship Between Two Simple Machines (2023)
- Death, Infinity and Zero (2023)

with Nick Roesler

- Ghosting a Funeral (2023)
- The Intimacy of Realism (2025)

with Margaret Glaspy

- Echo the Diamond (2023)

=== Other appearances ===
- Rhea Valentine – Rhea Valentine (1995)
- Tugboat – 1981 Decor (1998)
- Robert Skoro – Proof (2002)
- Meat Beat Manifesto – At The Center (2005)
- Haley Bonar – Lure The Fox (2006)
- Mason Jennings – Boneclouds (2006)
- Haley Bonar – Big Star (2008)
- Donna Lewis – Brand New Day (2015)
