= Orrin Evans =

American jazz pianist

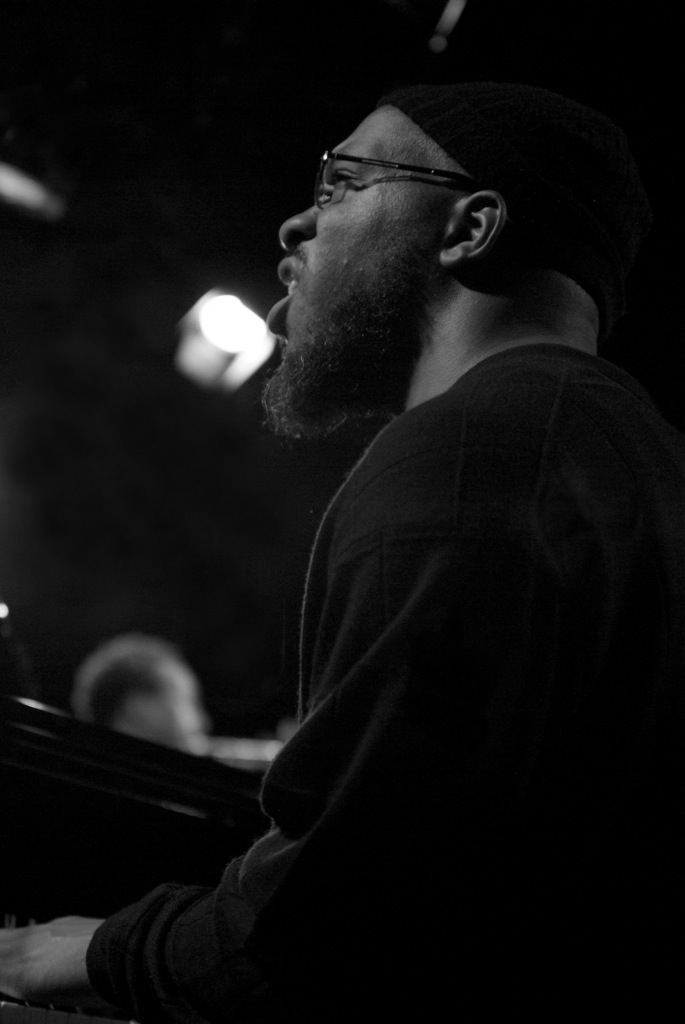
- Evans in 2008

Background information
- Born: 28 March 1975 (age 51)
- Origin: Trenton, New Jersey, United States
- Genre: Jazz
- Occupation: Musician
- Instrument: Piano
- Labels: Criss Cross, Posi-Tone, Palmetto, Smoke Sessions, RogueArt
- Website: www.orrinevansmusic.com

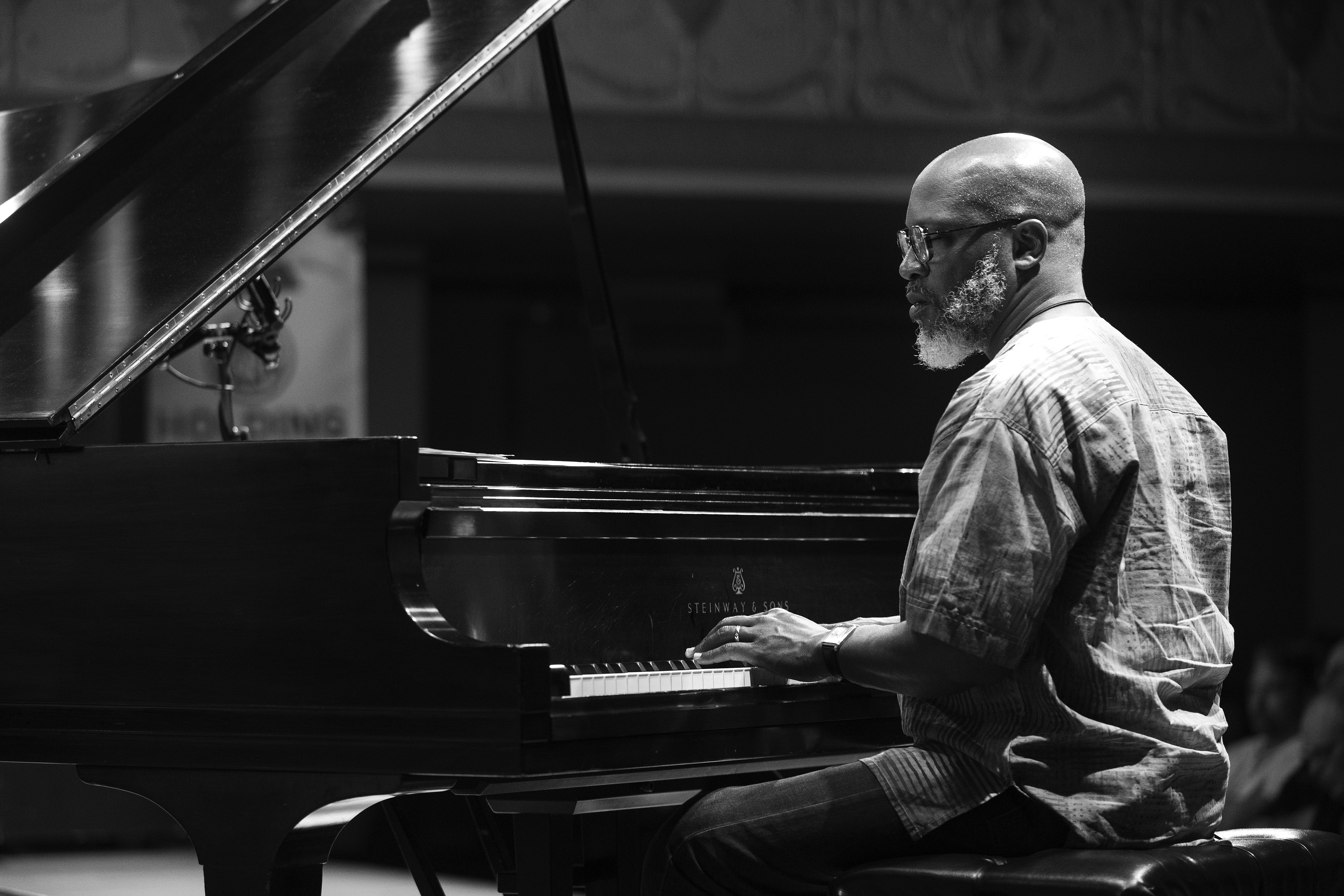
Orrin Evans, Arts for Art - Vision Festival 2024. Photo by Marek Lazarski

Orrin Evans (born 28 March 1975) is an American jazz pianist. Evans was born in Trenton, New Jersey and raised in Philadelphia. He attended Rutgers University, and then studied with Kenny Barron. He worked as a sideman for Bobby Watson, Ralph Peterson, Duane Eubanks, and Lenora Zenzalai-Helm, and released his debut as a leader in 1994. He signed with Criss Cross Jazz in 1997, recording prolifically with the label. He was awarded a 2010 Pew Fellowships in the Arts.

In 2017, Evans was named the new pianist in The Bad Plus replacing Ethan Iverson. He departed amicably in 2021 to focus on leading his own ensemble.

Evans is married to vocalist Dawn Warren Evans, who is also his manager.

== Discography ==
=== As leader ===
Recording date	Title	Label	Year released	Personnel/Notes
1995?	The Trio	Black Entertainment	1995	With Matthew Parrish (bass), Byron Landham (drums); reissued in 2001 as Deja Vu on Imani
1996–12	Justin Time	Criss Cross Jazz	1997	With John Swana (trumpet), Tim Warfield (tenor sax), Rodney Whitaker (bass), Byron Landham (drums)
1997–10, 1998–06	Captain Black	Criss Cross Jazz	1998	With Sam Newsome (soprano sax), Antonio Hart (alto sax), Ralph Bowen (tenor sax, soprano sax, alto sax), Tim Warfield (tenor sax), Avishai Cohen (bass), Rodney Whitaker (bass), Ralph Peterson (drums)
1998–06	Grown Folk Bizness	Criss Cross Jazz	1999	With Sam Newsome (soprano sax), Ralph Bowen (tenor sax, alto sax), Rodney Whitaker (bass), Ralph Peterson (drums)
1999–06	Listen to the Band	Criss Cross Jazz	2000	With Duane Eubanks (trumpet), Sam Newsome (soprano sax), Ralph Bowen (tenor sax, alto sax), Reid Anderson (bass), Nasheet Waits (drums)
2000–05	Seed	Imani	2000	As Seed, with Mike Boone (bass), Rodney Green (Drums), and Dawn Warren (Vocals)
2001–01	Blessed Ones	Criss Cross Jazz	2001	With Eric Revis (bass), Nasheet Waits and Edgar Bateman (drums)
2001–11	Live At Widener University	Imani	2004	As The Band, with J. D. Allen (tenor sax), Sam Newsome (soprano sax), Reid Anderson (bass), and Nasheet Waits (drums); in concert
2002–01	Meant to Shine	Palmetto	2002	With Eric Revis (bass), Gene Jackson (drums); some tracks with Sam Newsome (soprano sax) added; some tracks with Ralph Bowen (tenor sax, bass clarinet, flute, soprano sax) added
2003	Luvpark	Imani	2004	As Luvpark; with Ralph Bowen (sax), Donald Edwards (drums), J. D. Walter and Dawn Warren (vocals)
2004–04	Easy Now	Criss Cross Jazz	2005	With Ralph Bowen (soprano sax, alto sax), Mike Boone and Eric Revis (bass), Byron Landham and Rodney Green (drums)
2006?	The Trio – Live in Jackson, Mississippi	Imani	2006	Trio, with Madison Rast (bass), Byron Landham (drums); in concert
2006	Tarbaby	Imani	2009	As Tarbaby; with Stacy Dillard and J. D. Allen (tenor sax), Eric Revis (bass), Nasheet Waits (drums)
2009-–09	Faith in Action	Posi-Tone	2010	With Luques Curtis (bass), Nasheet Waits, Rocky Bryant and Gene Jackson (drums)
2010?	The End of Fear	Posi-Tone	2010	As Tarbaby; with J. D. Allen (tenor sax), Oliver Lake (alto sax), Nicholas Payton (trumpet), Eric Revis (bass), Nasheet Waits (drums )
2010	Captain Black Big Band	Posi-Tone	2011	As Captain Black Big Band; in concert
2010	Freedom	Posi-Tone	2011	With Larry McKenna (tenor sax), Dwayne Burno (bass), Byron Landham (drums, percussion), Anwar Marshall (drums)
2011	Ballad of Sam Langford	Hipnotic	2012	As Tarbaby; with Oliver Lake (sax), Ambrose Akinmusire (trumpet), Eric Revis (bass), Nasheet Waits (drums)
2011	Fanon	RogueArt	2013	As Tarbaby; with Oliver Lake (alto sax), Marc Ducret (guitar), Eric Revis (bass), Nasheet Waits (drums)
2011	Mother's Touch	Posi-Tone	2014	As Captain Black Big Band
2012	Flip the Script	Posi-Tone	2012	With Eric Revis, Ben Wolfe, Alex Claffy and Luques Curtis (bass), Donald Edwards (drums)
2013	...It Was Beauty	Criss Cross Jazz	2013	With Eric Revis (bass), Donald Edwards (drums)
2014	Liberation Blues	Smoke Sessions	2014	With Sean Jones, J. D. Allen, Luques Curtis (bass), Bill Stewart (drums); in concert
2014	The Evolution of Oneself	Smoke Sessions	2015	With Christian McBride (bass), Karriem Riggins (drums); two tracks with Marvin Sewell (guitar) added; one track with J. D. Walter (vocals) added
2016	#knowingishalfthebattle	Smoke Sessions	2016	Some tracks trio, with Luques Curtis (bass), Mark Whitfield Jr. (drums); Kurt Rosenwinkel and Kevin Eubanks (guitar), Caleb Wheeler Curtis (sax and flute), M'Balia Singley (vocals) are added on some tracks
2016	Presence	Smoke Sessions	2018	With the Captain Black Big Band; Troy Roberts (tenor sax), Caleb Wheeler Curtis and Todd Bashore (alto sax), John Raymond, Josh Lawrence and Bryan Davids (trumpet), David Gibson, Stafford Hunter and Brent White (trombone), Madison Rast (bass), Anwar Marshall and Jason Brown (drums)
2019	The Intangible Between	Smoke Sessions	2020	With the Captain Black Big Band; Troy Roberts (tenor sax), Stacy Dillard (tenor and soprano sax), Immanuel Wilkins (alto and soprano sax), Todd Bashore (flute and alto sax), Caleb Wheeler Curtis (alto sax), Sean Jones, Josh Lawrence and Thomas Marriott (trumpet), David Gibson, Stafford Hunter and Reggie Watkins (trombone), Dylan Reis, Eric Revis, Luques Curtis and Madison Rast (bass), Mark Whitfield Jr., Anwar Marshall and Jason Brown (drums)
2020	The Magic Of Now	Smoke Sessions	2021	With Vicente Archer (bass), Bill Stewart (drums), Immanuel Wilkins (alto sax)
2020 – 2022	The Red Door	Smoke Sessions	2023	Nicholas Payton (trumpet), Wallace Roney (trumpet), Gary Thomas (tenor sax & flute), Larry McKenna (tenor sax), Robert Hurst (bass), Buster Williams (bass), Marvin "Smitty" Smith (drums), Gene Jackson (drums)
