= Live Wires (album) =

Live album by Yellowjackets
- Released: March 17, 1992
- Recorded: November 15–16, 1991
- Venues: Roxy Theatre (West Hollywood) (Los Angeles, CA)
- Genre: Jazz
- Label: GRP
- Producer: Yellowjackets

Yellowjackets chronology
Greenhouse (1991)	Live Wires (1992)	Like a River (1993)

Professional ratings
Review scores
Source	Rating
Allmusic	4/5 stars

Live Wires is the first live album of the American jazz group Yellowjackets, released in 1992. The album was recorded live at Roxy Theatre in West Hollywood, California. The album reached a peak position of number two on Billboard's Top Contemporary Jazz Albums chart.

== Track listing ==
No.	Title	Writer(s)	Length
1.	"Homecoming"	Russell Ferrante	5:35
2.	"Bright Lights"	Bob Mintzer	6:53
3.	"The Dream"	Michael Franks, Ferrante, Jimmy Haslip, Marc Russo	5:08
4.	"Freedomland"	Ferrante	6:26
5.	"Downtown"	Ferrante	4:51
6.	"Claire's Song"	Ferrante	7:41
7.	"Geraldine"	Ferrante	7:21
8.	"The Spin"	Ferrante, Haslip, Russo, William Kennedy	9:47
9.	"Wildlife"	Ferrante, Haslip, Acuña	9:26
10.	"Revelation"	Loraine Perry, Ferrante	6:24

== Personnel ==
Yellowjackets

- Russell Ferrante – keyboards
- Jimmy Haslip – bass
- Will Kennedy – drums
- Bob Mintzer – saxophones, bass clarinet, EWI

Guest Musicians

- Steve Croes – Synclavier
- Paulinho da Costa – percussion
- Vince Mendoza – string arrangements (7)

Guest Vocalists

- Michael Franks – lead vocals (3)
- Brenda Russell – backing vocals (3)
- Marilyn Scott – backing vocals (3)
- Take 6 – vocals (10)

== Production ==
- Gary Borman – executive producer
- Yellowjackets – producers
- Mick Guzauski – chief engineer, digital mixing
- Guy Charbonneau – remote recording engineer
- Andrew Warwick – assistant engineer
- Gil Morales – mix assistant
- Bill Jackson – editing
- Tom Nellen – editing assistant
- Doug Sax – mastering
- Dr. Dave – technician
- Michael Pollard – GRP production coordinator
- Doreen Kalcich – assistant coordinator
- Andy Baltimore – GRP creative director
- David Gibb – design
- Scott Johnson – design
- Sonny Mediana – design
- Andy Ruggirello – design
- Dan Serrano – design
- Lou Beach – illustration
- Penny Crichton – photography

Studios

- Recorded live at The Roxy (West Hollywood, California).
- Remote recording at Le Mobile (Carlsbad, California).
- Mixed at Conway Studios (Hollywood, California).
- Edited at Sunset Sound (Hollywood, California).
- Mastered at The Mastering Lab (Hollywood, California).

== Charts ==
Chart (1992)	Peak position
US Top Contemporary Jazz Albums (Billboard)	2
