= Like a River =

Studio album by Yellowjackets
- Released: January 19, 1993
- Recorded: April 1992
- Studio: Conway Studios (Hollywood, California); The Complex (Los Angeles, California)
- Genre: Jazz
- Length: 61:48
- Label: GRP
- Producer: Yellowjackets

Yellowjackets chronology
Live Wires (1992)	Like a River (1993)	Run for Your Life (1994)

Professional ratings
Review scores
Source	Rating
Allmusic	4.5/5 stars

Like a River (1993) is the ninth studio album (10th overall) from the jazz group Yellowjackets, and their fifth studio album (sixth overall) for GRP Records. The album was nominated for "Best Contemporary Jazz Recording" Grammy Award.The album reached a peak position of number three on Billboard's Top Contemporary Jazz Albums chart.

The tracks "My Old School" and "Dewey (for Miles)" are frequently included in Yellowjackets' set lists, the former being included in their live album "Twenty Five."

The album is dedicated to the memory of Jeff Porcaro, who had died in 1992.

== Track listing ==
No.	Title	Writer(s)	Length
1.	"Man Facing North"	Russell Ferrante, Jimmy Haslip, William Kennedy, Bob Mintzer	6:28
2.	"My Old School"	Ferrante, Haslip	7:13
3.	"River Waltz"	Ferrante, Haslip, Kennedy	6:00
4.	"Dewey" (for Miles)	Ferrante, Haslip	5:40
5.	"Memoirs"	Mintzer	6:19
6.	"Azure Moon"	Ferrante, Haslip	6:02
7.	"Sueños"	Bill Gable, Ferrante, Haslip	6:35
8.	"1998"	Ferrante, Haslip, Kennedy	6:58
9.	"Sandstone"	Ferrante, Haslip, Kennedy	5:29
10.	"Solitude"	Ferrante	5:04

== Personnel ==
Yellowjackets

- Russell Ferrante – acoustic piano, synthesizers
- Jimmy Haslip – 6-string bass, Tobias semi-hollow body electric bass, vocals
- Will Kennedy – drums
- Bob Mintzer – soprano saxophone, tenor saxophone, bass clarinet, EWI

Guest Musicians

- Steve Croes – Synclavier
- Naná Vasconcelos – percussion, vocals
- Judd Miller – EWI programming
- Tim Hagens – trumpet
- Bill Gable – vocals

== Production ==
- Yellowjackets – producers
- Mick Guzauski – recording engineer, mixing
- Bill Jackson – overdub engineer
- Michael Verdick – additional mixing
- Gil Morales – assistant engineer
- Chad Blinman – assistant overdub engineer, mix assistant
- Kevin Gray – mastering at Location Recording Service (Burbank, California)
- Joseph Doughney – post-production
- Michael Landy – post-production
- Adam Zelinka – post-production
- The Review Room (New York City, New York) – post-production location
- Michael Pollard – GRP production coordinator
- Sally G. Poppe – production coordinator
- Andy Baltimore – GRP creative director
- Margi Denton (Denton Design Associates) – design
- Elizabeth Burrill (Denton Design Associates) – design
- Richard Laird – photography
- Gary Borman – artist management

== Charts ==
Chart (1993)	Peak position
US Top Contemporary Jazz Albums (Billboard)	3
