= Mint Jam =

Live album by Yellowjackets
- Released: 2001
- Studio: The Mint (Los Angeles, California)
- Genre: Jazz
- Length: 1:19:42
- Label: Yellowjackets Entertainment
- Producer: Yellowjackets

Yellowjackets chronology
| Best of Yallowjackts (1999) | Mint Jam (2001) | Time Squared (2003) |

Professional ratings
Review scores
| Source | Rating |
|---|---|
| Allmusic | 4.5/5 stars |

Mint Jam is the second live album of the American jazz group Yellowjackets, released in 2001.

== Track listing ==
Disc 1
| No. | Title | Writer(s) | Length |
|---|---|---|---|
| 1. | "Les Is Mo" | Russell Ferrante | 4:30 |
| 2. | "Boomtown" | Ferrante, Jimmy Haslip | 5:23 |
| 3. | "Motet" | Ferrante, Haslip | 9:16 |
| 4. | "Mofongo" | Bob Mintzer | 7:00 |
| 5. | "Blues for KJ" | Ferrante | 5:08 |
| 6. | "Runferyerlife" | Mintzer | 7:00 |

Disc 2
| No. | Title | Writer(s) | Length |
|---|---|---|---|
| 1. | "Song for Carla" | Mintzer | 5:24 |
| 2. | "Tortoise and the Hare" | Ferrante, Haslip, William Kennedy, Marc Russo | 7:09 |
| 3. | "Mosaic" | Mintzer | 6:14 |
| 4. | "New Jig" | Ferrante | 6:57 |
| 5. | "Statue of Liberty" | Ferrante | 9:34 |
| 6. | "Evening News" | Ferrante, Kennedy, Mintzer | 6:06 |

== Personnel ==
Yellowjackets

- Russell Ferrante – acoustic piano, synthesizers
- Jimmy Haslip – electric bass
- Marcus Baylor – drums
- Bob Mintzer – tenor saxophone, EWI

=== Production ===
- Yellowjackets – producers
- Rich Breen – recording, mixing
- Scott Camarota – assistant engineer
- Geoff Gillette – house sound engineer
- Tom Baker – mastering at Precision Mastering (Los Angeles, California)
- Margi Denton – art direction, design
- Harry Chamberlain – photography
- Glen La Ferman – band photography
