= Run for Your Life (Yellowjackets album) =

Studio album by Yellowjackets
- Released: 1994
- Recorded: O'Henry Sound Studios (Burbank, CA); The Complex (Los Angeles, CA)
- Genre: Jazz
- Length: 53:22
- Label: GRP
- Producer: Yellowjackets

Yellowjackets chronology
Like a River (1993)	Run for Your Life (1994)	Dreamland (1995)

Run for Your Life is an album by the American jazz group Yellowjackets, released in 1994. The album reached a peak position of number eight on Billboard's Top Contemporary Jazz Albums chart. It was nominated for a Grammy Award, in the "Best Contemporary Jazz Performance" category.

== Critical reception ==
Professional ratings
Review scores
Source	Rating
AllMusic	4.5/5 stars
The Charlotte Observer	4/4 stars
The Virgin Encyclopedia of Eighties Music	3/5 stars

The Globe and Mail opined that "only tenor saxophonist Bon Mintzer's 'The Red Sea' is particularly memorable." The Charlotte Observer called Run for Your Life "the best jazz album of the year," writing that it "is a collection of nine simply superior jazz cuts, each showing off the band's precision and ability."

== Track listing ==
No.	Title	Writer(s)	Length
1.	"Jacket Town"	Russell Ferrante, William Kennedy	5:25
2.	"Even Song"	Ferrante, Jimmy Haslip, Kennedy	6:33
3.	"Runferyerlife"	Bob Mintzer	4:22
4.	"The Red Sea"	Mintzer	5:45
5.	"Muhammed"	Ferrante, Haslip	6:47
6.	"City of Lights"	Ferrante	6:56
7.	"Sage"	Mintzer	5:04
8.	"Ancestors"	Mintzer	5:01
9.	"Wisdom"	Ferrante, Haslip	7:29

== Personnel ==
Yellowjackets

- Russell Ferrante – keyboards
- Jimmy Haslip – bass, vocals
- Will Kennedy – drums
- Bob Mintzer – soprano saxophone, tenor saxophone, bass clarinet, EWI

Additional musicians

- Steve Croes – Synclavier
- Judd Miller – synthesizer programming
- Robben Ford – guitars

=== Production ===
- Yellowjackets – producers
- Mick Guzauski – engineer
- James Farber – engineer, mixing
- Richard Landers – assistant engineer
- Gil Morales – assistant engineer
- Chad Blinman – mix assistant
- Joseph Doughney – post-production
- Michael Landy – post-production
- The Review Room (New York City, New York) – post-production location
- Kevin Gray – mastering at Location Recording Service (Burbank, California)
- Michael Pollard – GRP production coordinator
- Diane Dragonette – GRP production coordination assistant
- Sonny Mediana – GRP production director
- Sharon Franklin – GRP production direction assistant
- Andy Baltimore – GRP creative director
- Margi Denton – design
- Tim Lewis – illustration
- Philip Avery Noble – photography
- Gary Borman – management
- Sally G. Poppe – management

== Charts ==
Chart (1994)	Peak position
US Top Contemporary Jazz Albums (Billboard)	8
