= Altered State (Yellowjackets album) =

Studio album by Yellowjackets
- Released: Mar 22, 2005
- Studio: Schnee Studios (Studio City, California)
- Genre: Jazz
- Length: 59:55
- Label: Heads Up
- Producer: Yellowjackets

Yellowjackets chronology
Peace Round (2004)	Altered State (2005)	Twenty Five (2006)

Professional ratings
Review scores
Source	Rating
Allmusic	3.5/5 stars

Altered State (2005) is the 16th studio album (18th overall) from the jazz group Yellowjackets, and their third release for the Heads Up International label.

The cover image was painted by pop art painter Peter Max.

== Track listing ==
No.	Title	Writer(s)	Length
1.	"Suite 15"	Russell Ferrante	4:51
2.	"March Majestic"	Bob Mintzer	5:20
3.	"The Hope"	Jimmy Haslip, Ferrante, Jean Baylor	5:02
4.	"Hunter's Point"	Ferrante	6:14
5.	"Mother Earth"	Mintzer	4:43
6.	"Youth Eternal"	Haslip	5:08
7.	"Free Day"	Marcus Baylor	5:28
8.	"Cross Current"	Mintzer	5:29
9.	"Aha"	Mintzer	5:49
10.	"57 Chevy"	Ferrante	6:23
11.	"Unity"	M. Baylor, Mintzer	5:56

== Personnel ==
Yellowjackets

- Russell Ferrante – acoustic piano, electric piano, keyboards
- Jimmy Haslip – electric bass
- Marcus Baylor – drums
- Bob Mintzer – tenor saxophone, soprano saxophone, bass clarinet, EWI

Guest Musicians

- Mike Shapiro – percussion (1, 4)
- Jean Baylor – lead vocal (3)
- Sharon Perry – backing vocals (3)
- Lori Perry – backing vocals (3)
- Carolyn Perry – backing vocals (3)
- Darlene Perry – backing vocals (3)

== Production ==
- Dave Love – executive producer
- Yellowjackets – producers
- Bill Schnee – engineer
- Ryan Petry – assistant engineer
- Rich Breen – mixing and mastering at Dogmatic Studios (Burbank, California)
- Margi Denton – graphic design
- Mitch Haupers (KVON) – photography
- Robert Hoffman – live photography
- Peter Max – cover artwork
- Axis Artist Management, Inc. – management
