= Greenhouse (Yellowjackets album) =

Studio album by Yellowjackets
- Released: February 19, 1991
- Studio: Schnee Studios (North Hollywood, California)
- Genre: Jazz fusion, smooth jazz
- Length: 60:08
- Label: GRP
- Producer: Yellowjackets

Yellowjackets chronology
The Spin (1989)	Greenhouse (1991)	Live Wires (1992)

Professional ratings
Review scores
Source	Rating
Allmusic	4.5/5 stars

Greenhouse is the eighth studio album of the American jazz group Yellowjackets, released in 1991. In this album, the group was a trio. Bob Mintzer, who became an official member on the next album, was credited as a guest artist. The album reached a peak position of number one on Billboard's Top Contemporary Jazz Albums chart.

== Track listing ==
No.	Title	Writer(s)	Length
1.	"Freedomland"	Russell Ferrante	6:09
2.	"Greenhouse"	Ferrante, Jimmy Haslip	9:00
3.	"Seven Stars"	Ferrante, Haslip, William Kennedy	7:33
4.	"Indian Summer"	Ferrante	5:33
5.	"Spirits"	Bob Mintzer	6:00
6.	"Brown Zone"	Steve Khan	4:50
7.	"Liam/Rain Dance"	Haslip, Steve Croes, Ferrante	6:34
8.	"Invisible People"	Ferrante, Haslip, Kennedy	5:45
9.	"Freda"	Kenny Baker	5:24
10.	"Peace"	Bill Gable	3:20

== Personnel ==
Yellowjackets

- Russell Ferrante – acoustic piano, synthesizers
- Jimmy Haslip – bass
- Will Kennedy – drums

Guest musicians

- Bob Mintzer – tenor saxophone, soprano saxophone, bass clarinet, alto flute, EWI
- Steve Croes – Synclavier (digital music workstation)
- Alex Acuña – percussion
- Judd Miller – EWI programming (9)
- Stuart Canin – violin solo (9)
- Bill Gable – vocals (8)

Orchestra (tracks 2, 4 & 9)

- Vince Mendoza – arrangements and conductor
- Sandy de Crescent – contractor
- Michael O'Donovan – bassoon
- Gary Gray and James Kanter – clarinet
- James Walker – flute
- John Cooke, Dane Little, Judith Perett and David Speltz – cello
- Timothy Barr and Arni Egglison – double bass
- Brian Dembow, Pamela Goldsmith, Dan Neufeld and Mihail Zinovyev – viola
- Arnold Belnick, Stuart Canin, Bruce Dukov, Clayton Haslop, Bill Hybel, Karen Jones, Kathleen Lenski, Irma Neuman, Anatoly Rosinsky, Sheldon Sanov, Polly Sweeney and Dorothy Wade – violin

== Production ==
- Yellowjackets – producers
- Jan Erik Kongshaug – engineer, mixing
- Ken Allardyce – assistant engineer
- Joseph Doughney – post-production
- Michael Landy – post-production
- The Review Room (New York City, New York) – post-production location
- Stephen Marcussen – mastering at Precision Lacquer (Hollywood, California)
- Michelle Lewis – production coordinator
- Andy Baltimore – creative director
- David Gibb – graphic design
- Scott Johnson – graphic design
- Sonny Mediana – graphic design
- Andy Ruggirello – graphic design
- Dan Serrano – graphic design
- Wifredo Lam – cover artwork
- Jimmy Haslip – back cover photography
- Will Kennedy – back cover photography
- Gary Borden – management
