= Lifecycle (album) =

Studio album by Yellowjackets featuring Mike Stern
- Released: May 20, 2008
- Studio: BiCostal Music (Ossining, NY)
- Genre: Jazz
- Length: 1:02:43
- Label: Heads Up
- Producer: Yellowjackets

Yellowjackets chronology
Twenty Five (2006)	Lifecycle (2008)	Timeline (2011)

Professional ratings
Review scores
Source	Rating
Allmusic	3.5/5 stars

Lifecycle is the 17th studio album by the American jazz group Yellowjackets featuring Mike Stern, released in 2008. The album reached a peak position of number thirteen on Billboard's Top Jazz Albums chart.

== Track listing ==
No.	Title	Writer(s)	Length
1.	"Falken's Maze"	Bob Mintzer	6:25
2.	"Country Living"	Jimmy Haslip	6:25
3.	"Double Nickel"	Mike Stern	6:43
4.	"Dreams Go"	Stern	6:49
5.	"Measure of a Man"	Russell Ferrante	7:34
6.	"Yahoo"	Mintzer	4:53
7.	"I Wonder"	Mintzer	6:01
8.	"3 Circles"	Marcus Baylor, Ferrante, Haslip, Mintzer	7:32
9.	"Claire's Closet"	Ferrante	5:06
10.	"Lazaro"	Haslip, Mintzer	5:15

== Personnel ==
Yellowjackets

- Russell Ferrante – acoustic piano, keyboards, percussion
- Jimmy Haslip – electric bass, programming (10), sequencing (10)
- Marcus Baylor – drums, percussion
- Bob Mintzer – tenor saxophone, soprano saxophone, bass clarinet, Bb clarinet, EWI

Special Guest

- Mike Stern – guitars

=== Production ===
- Dave Love – executive producer
- Yellowjackets – producers
- Rich Breen – engineer, mixing, mastering
- Daryl Bornstein – assistant engineer
- Hal Winer – assistant engineer, technician
- Michael Bishop – mastering
- Jerry Mitkowski – piano technician
- Mike Sciotto – technician
- Margi Tobey – video editor
- Natalie Singer – product manager
- Margi Denton – graphic design
- KVON – photography

Management

- Megan Ehrlich, Jeff Neben and Gerry Puhara at Axis Artist Management, Inc.
- Roy Holland – management for Mike Stern.

Studios

- Recorded at BiCostal Music (Ossining, NY).
- Mixed and Mastered at Dogmatic Studios (Burbank, CA).

== Charts ==
Chart (2008)	Peak position
US Top Jazz Albums (Billboard)	13
