= Mirage a Trois =

Studio album by Yellowjackets
- Released: April 20, 1983
- Studios: Sound Labs and Sunset Sound (Hollywood, California)
- Genre: Jazz
- Length: 40:52
- Label: Warner
- Producer: Tommy LiPuma

Yellowjackets chronology
Yellowjackets (1981)	Mirage a Trois (1983)	Samurai Samba (1985)

Professional ratings
Review scores
Source	Rating
Allmusic	4/5 stars

Mirage a Trois is the second album of the American jazz group Yellowjackets, released in 1983. The album reached a peak position of number 145 on the Billboard 200 and number 7 on Billboard's Jazz Albums chart. It was nominated for the Grammy Award for Best Jazz Fusion Performance in 1984.

== Track listing ==
1. "Claire's Song" (Russell Ferrante) - 5:11
2. "Top Secret" (Jimmy Haslip, Ferrante, Ricky Lawson) - 6:11
3. "I Got Rhythm" (George Gershwin, Ira Gershwin) - 4:34
4. "Pass It On" (Ferrante) - 6:14
5. "Goin' Home" (Ferrante) - 5:38
6. "Man in the Moon" (Haslip, Ferrante) - 4:38
7. "Elamar" (Mike Miller) - 4:10
8. "Nimbus" (Ferrante) - 4:46

== Personnel ==
Yellowjackets

- Russell Ferrante – keyboards, acoustic piano
- Jimmy Haslip – bass guitar
- Ricky Lawson – drums

Additional musicians

- Scott Page – sequencing (1)
- Anthony McShear – sequencing (1)
- James Newton Howard – synthesizer programming, arrangements (7, 8)
- Robben Ford – guitars (2, 4–6)
- Mike Miller – guitars (3, 7, 8)
- Richard Elliot – lyricon (all except 2), saxophone (6)
- Paulinho da Costa – percussion
- Max Carl – vocals (3)
- Randy Crawford – vocals (3)
- Yolan Fischer – vocals (3)
- Bruce Hornsby – vocals (3)
- Bill LaBounty – vocals (3)
- Brenda Russell – vocals (3)
- Marilyn Scott – vocals (3)
- Pauline Wilson – vocals (3)

== Production ==
- Tommy LiPuma – producer
- Norm Kinney – recording, mixing
- Don Koldon – assistant engineer
- Peggy McCreary – assistant engineer
- Richard McKernan – assistant engineer
- Bernie Grundman – mastering at A&M Studios (Hollywood, California)
- Simon Levy – art direction
- Jeff Lancaster (Art Hotel) – design
- Jim Shea – photography
- Mary Anne Frye – concept photography

== Charts ==
Chart (1983)	Peak position
Billboard 200	145
Billboard Jazz Albums	7
