= Blue Hats =

Studio album by Yellowjackets
- Released: February 11, 1997
- Studio: Sony Music Studios (Santa Monica, CA)
- Genre: Jazz
- Length: 56:32
- Label: Warner
- Producer: Yellowjackets

Yellowjackets chronology
Dreamland (1995)	Blue Hats (1997)	Club Nocturne (1998)

Professional ratings
Review scores
Source	Rating
AllMusic	4/5 stars

Blue Hats is an album by the American jazz group Yellowjackets, released in 1997. The album reached a peak position of number nine on Billboard's Top Contemporary Jazz Albums chart.

== Track listing ==
No.	Title	Writer(s)	Length
1.	"Cape Town"	Russell Ferrante, Jimmy Haslip, William Kennedy	5:37
2.	"With These Hands"	Ferrante, Kennedy	6:56
3.	"Prayer for Peace"	Bob Mintzer	6:48
4.	"Statue of Liberty"	Ferrante	6:12
5.	"Coal Miner Blues"	Ferrante	5:57
6.	"Savanna"	Ferrante, Haslip, Kennedy	7:09
7.	"New Rochelle"	Mintzer	6:07
8.	"Coquimbo"	Ferrante, Haslip, Kennedy	4:31
9.	"Angelina"	Ferrante, Haslip	7:15

== Personnel ==
Yellowjackets

- Russell Ferrante – acoustic piano, synthesizers
- Jimmy Haslip – 5-string basses, 6-string and 7-string fretless basses
- Will Kennedy – drums
- Bob Mintzer – soprano saxophone, tenor saxophone, bass clarinet, EWI

=== Production ===
- Yellowjackets – producers
- Rich Breen – recording
- Troy Gonzales – recording assistant
- Malcolm Pollack – mixing at O'Henry Sound Studios (Burbank, California)
- Brett Swain – mix assistant
- Greg Calbi – mastering at Masterdisk (New York City, New York)
- Sally Poppy – project coordinator, management
- Margi Denton – art direction, design
- Caroline Greyshock – photography
- Gary Borman – management

== Charts ==
Chart (1997)	Peak position
US Top Contemporary Jazz Albums (Billboard)	9
