= Samurai Samba =

Studio album by Yellowjackets
- Released: 1985
- Studio: Larrabee Sound Studios (Los Angeles, CA); Mad Hatter Recording Studios (Los Angeles, CA); Music Grinder (Los Angeles, CA); Sunset Sound (Los Angeles, CA)
- Genre: Jazz
- Length: 39:12
- Label: Warner
- Producer: Tommy LiPuma, Yellowjackets

Yellowjackets chronology
Mirage a Trois (1983)	Samurai Samba (1985)	Shades (1986)

Professional ratings
Review scores
Source	Rating
Allmusic	4/5 stars

Samurai Samba is the third album of the American jazz group Yellowjackets, released in 1985. The album reached a peak position of number 179 on the Billboard 200 and number 10 on Billboard's Jazz Albums chart.

== Track listing ==
No.	Title	Writer(s)	Length
1.	"Homecoming"	Russell Ferrante	5:13
2.	"Deat Beat"	Ferrante, Jimmy Haslip, Ricky Lawson, Marc Russo	5:25
3.	"Daddy's Gonna Miss You"	Ferrante, Haslip, Lawson, Russo	4:33
4.	"Sylvania"	Ferrante, Haslip, Lawson	4:14
5.	"Silverlake"	Ferrante	5:45
6.	"Lonely Weekend"	Ferrante, Joseph Curiale, Lawson, Caldwell	4:20
7.	"Los Mambos"	Ferrante, Russo, Paulinho da Costa	4:24
8.	"Samurai Samba"	Ferrante	5:18

== Personnel ==
Yellowjackets

- Russell Ferrante – keyboards
- Jimmy Haslip – 5-string bass
- Ricky Lawson – acoustic drums, Simmons drums
- Marc Russo – alto saxophone

Additional musicians

- Rory Kaplan – Fairlight CMI programming
- Michael Landau – guitars
- Carlos Rios – guitars
- Paulinho da Costa – percussion, vocals, lead vocals (7, listed as Paulo da Costa Jr.)
- Marilyn Scott – vocals
- Carl Caldwell – vocals
- Bobby Caldwell – lead vocals (6)

== Production ==
- Yellowjackets – producers
- Tommy LiPuma – producer
- Erik Zobler – engineer, mixing
- Terry Christian – second engineer
- Toni Greene – second engineer
- Jon Ingoldsby – second engineer
- Peggy McCreary – second engineer
- Casey McMackin – second engineer
- Steve Shelton – second engineer
- Gary Wagner – second engineer
- Simon Levy – art direction, design
- Lou Beach – cover artwork
- Jeff Katz – photography

Studios

- Recorded at Larrabee Sound Studios (North Hollywood, CA); Sunset Sound and Music Grinder Studios (Hollywood, CA); Mad Hatter Studios (Los Angeles, CA).
- Mixed at Sunset Sound

== Charts ==
Chart (1985)	Peak position
Billboard 200	179
Billboard Jazz Albums	10
