= Peace Round =

Studio album by Yellowjackets
- Released: 2003
- Studio: Entourage Studios (North Hollywood, California)
- Genre: Jazz, holiday
- Length: 48:04
- Label: Heads Up
- Producer: Yellowjackets

Yellowjackets chronology
Time Squared (2003)	Peace Round (2003)	Altered State (2005)

Professional ratings
Review scores
Source	Rating
Allmusic	2.5/5 stars

Peace Round: A Christmas Celebration is the holiday album of the jazz group Yellowjackets.

== Track listing ==
No.	Title	Writer(s)	Length
1.	"Little Drummer Boy"	Davis, Onorati, Simeone	5:24
2.	"Silent Night"	Gruber, Mohr	3:48
3.	"Deck the Halls"	Traditional	5:21
4.	"Have Yourself a Merry Little Christmas"	Blane, Martin	5:10
5.	"Peace Round"	Old English Canon, Ritchie	4:50
6.	"The First Noel"	Traditional	5:50
7.	"God Rest Ye Merry Gentlemen"	Traditional	4:53
8.	"Oh Little Town of Bethlehem"	Brooks, Redner	5:59
9.	"Winter Wonderland"	Bernard, Smith	3:17
10.	"In a Silent Night"	Gruber, Mohr, Zawinul	3:32

== Personnel ==
Yellowjackets

- Russell Ferrante – pianos, synthesizers, arrangements (4–6)
- Jimmy Haslip – basses, synthesizers, arrangements (8)
- Marcus Baylor – drums, arrangements (6)
- Bob Mintzer – soprano saxophone, tenor saxophone, arrangements (1–3, 7)

Additional arrangements

- Jean Baylor (6)

=== Production ===
- Yellowjackets – producers
- Geoff Gillette – engineer, mixing, mastering
- Yutaka Yokokura – engineer, mixing, mastering
- Mauricio Cajuerio – assistant engineer
- Margi Denton – graphic design
- Bryan J. Denton – photography
