= Bang!Zoom =

Studio album by Bobby McFerrin
- Released: 1995
- Studio: Ocean Way Recording (Hollywood, California); Fantasy Studios (Berkeley, California); Skyline Studios (Oakland, California)
- Genre: Vocal jazz
- Length: 45:56
- Label: Blue Note
- Producer: Russell Ferrante, Bobby McFerrin

Bang!Zoom is the fifth studio album and fourth solo studio album by American vocalist and jazz/folk musician Bobby McFerrin, released by Blue Note Records. The line-up includes several members of the jazz fusion band Yellowjackets.

The album reached number 10 on Billboard's Top Contemporary Jazz Albums chart.

== Track listing ==
All tracks are written by Bobby McFerrin, except where noted.

No.	Title	Writer(s)	Length
1.	"Bang!Zoom"	Bobby McFerrin, Russell Ferrante	5:33
2.	"Remembrance"	Bobby McFerrin, Russell Ferrante	5:17
3.	"Friends"		4:28
4.	"Selim"	Miles Davis	5:19
5.	"Freedom Is a Voice"	Bobby McFerrin, Russell Ferrante	4:54
6.	"Heaven's Design"		5:57
7.	"My Better Half"		4:43
8.	"Kids' Toys"		5:17
9.	"Mere Words"		4:25

== Personnel ==
- Bobby McFerrin – vocals

Musicians

- Russell Ferrante – pianos, synthesizers
- Judd Miller – synthesizer programming
- Paul Nagel – Fender Rhodes (6)
- Paul Jackson Jr. – guitars
- Jimmy Haslip – bass
- Will Kennedy – drums
- Paulinho da Costa – percussion
- Bob Mintzer – saxophones, bass clarinet, EWI
- Scott Wendholt – trumpet (4)
- Tower of Power horn section (7)
  - Stephen "Doc" Kupka
  - Emilio Castillo
  - David Mann
  - Greg Adams (also horn arrangements)
  - Lee Thornburg

=== Production ===
- Russell Ferrante – producer
- Bobby McFerrin – producer
- Malcolm Pollack - engineer, mixing
- Bill Gable – engineer
- David Luke – engineer
- Chris Tergeson – engineer
- Jeff DeMorris – assistant engineer
- Sheree Draft – assistant engineer
- Roman Foods – assistant engineer
- Rich Lamb – assistant engineer
- Michael Semanick – assistant engineer
- P.R. Brown – art direction, design
- Mark Seliger – photography

== Critical reception ==
Professional ratings
Review scores
Source	Rating
Allmusic	2/5 stars

In terms of critical reception, the album was met with only a 2 star-review on behalf of Allmusic.
