= Timeline (Yellowjackets album) =

Studio album by Yellowjackets
- Released: 2011
- Studio: Firehouse Recording Studios (Pasadena, California); Dogmatic Sound (Burbank, California)
- Genre: Jazz
- Length: 62:09
- Label: Mack Avenue
- Producer: Yellowjackets

Yellowjackets chronology
Lifecycle (2008)	Timeline (2011)	A Rise in the Road (2013)

Timeline is an album by the American jazz group Yellowjackets, released in 2011. The album reached a peak position of number five on Billboard's Top Jazz Albums chart, and was nominated for Best Jazz Instrumental Album at the Grammy Awards of 2012.

== Track listing ==
No.	Title	Writer(s)	Length
1.	"Why Is It"	Bob Mintzer	5:04
2.	"Tenacity"	Mintzer	6:07
3.	"Rosemary"	Will Kennedy	4:54
4.	"Timeline"	Russell Ferrante	5:11
5.	"Magnolia"	Ferrante, Jimmy Haslip	4:36
6.	"A Single Step"	Ferrante	7:05
7.	"Indivisible"	Ferrante	5:22
8.	"Like Elvin"	Mintzer	5:32
9.	"My Soliloquy"	Mintzer	6:23
10.	"Numerology"	Ferrante	5:56
11.	"I Do"	Ferrante	6:01

== Personnel ==
Yellowjackets

- Russell Ferrante – keyboards, acoustic piano
- Will Kennedy – keyboards, drums
- Jimmy Haslip – bass
- Bob Mintzer – soprano saxophone, tenor saxophone, bass clarinet

Guest Musicians

- Robben Ford – guitars (5)
- John Daversa – trumpet (2, 8)

=== Production ===
- Gretchen Valade – executive producer
- Al Pryor – A&R direction
- Yellowjackets – producers
- Rich Breen – recording, mixing, mastering
- Ed Woolley – assistant engineer
- Will Wakefield – production manager
- Maria Ehrenreich – creative direction, production services
- Randall Kennedy – creative direction
- Raj Naik – art direction, design, photography
- Inbar Neer – styling, make-up
- Karin Giron – styling, make-up assistant
- Axis Artist Management, Inc. – management
