= Time Squared (album) =

Studio album by Yellowjackets
- Released: May 27, 2003
- Studio: Firehouse Recording Studios (New York City, New York); Dogmatic Studios (Burbank, California)
- Genre: Jazz
- Length: 1:01:43
- Label: Heads Up
- Producer: Yellowjackets

Yellowjackets chronology
| Mint Jam (2001) | Time Squared (2003) | Peace Round (2004) |

Professional ratings
Review scores
| Source | Rating |
|---|---|
| AllMusic | 4/5 stars |
| Thatdoesntsoundright | Negative |

Time Squared is the 14th studio album by American jazz group Yellowjackets, released in 2003. The album reached a peak position of number fifteen on Billboard's Top Jazz Albums chart.

== Track listing ==
| No. | Title | Writer(s) | Length |
|---|---|---|---|
| 1. | "Go Go" | Bob Mintzer | 5:33 |
| 2. | "Monk's Habit" | Russell Ferrante | 5:12 |
| 3. | "Smithtown" | Ferrante, Jimmy Haslip | 5:17 |
| 4. | "Healing Waters" | Marcus Baylor, Ferrante | 6:10 |
| 5. | "Time Squared" | Mintzer | 6:45 |
| 6. | "Gabriela Rose" | Ferrante, Haslip | 4:53 |
| 7. | "Sea Folk" | Ferrante | 6:31 |
| 8. | "V" | Ferrante | 5:27 |
| 9. | "Claire @ 18" | Ferrante | 5:29 |
| 10. | "Village Gait" | Mintzer | 5:31 |
| 11. | "My 1st Best Friend" | Ferrante | 4:49 |

== Personnel ==
Yellowjackets

- Russell Ferrante – keyboards, acoustic piano
- Jimmy Haslip – electric bass
- Marcus Baylor – drums, percussion
- Bob Mintzer – tenor saxophone, soprano saxophone, bass clarinet, Bb clarinet, flute, EWI

with:

- Jean Baylor – vocal on "Healing Waters"

=== Production ===
- Dave Love – executive producer
- Yellowjackets – producers
- Rich Breen – recording, mixing
- Ed Woolley – assistant engineer
- Jay Frigoletto – digital compiling, editing
- Dave Collins – mastering at Master Suite (Hollywood, California)
- Margi Denton – graphic design
- Carol Taylor – cover artwork
- Dale Gold – photography
- Axis Artist Management, Inc. – management
- Ted Kurland & Associates – booking
