= Dreamland (Yellowjackets album) =

Studio album by Yellowjackets
- Released: August 8, 1995
- Studio: O'Henry Sound Studios (Burbank, California); One On One Studios (North Hollywood, California); Stoneglen Sound (LeCanada, California)
- Genre: Jazz
- Length: 52:59
- Label: Warner
- Producer: Yellowjackets

Yellowjackets chronology
Run for Your Life (Yellowjackets album) (1995)	Dreamland (1995)	Blue Hats (1997)

Professional ratings
Review scores
Source	Rating
Allmusic	4.5/5 stars

Dreamland is an album by the American jazz group Yellowjackets, released in 1995. The album reached a peak position of number twelve on Billboard's Top Contemporary Jazz Albums chart.

== Track listing ==
No.	Title	Writer(s)	Length
1.	"The Chosen"	Russell Ferrante, Jimmy Haslip	4:59
2.	"Blacktop"	Ferrante, Haslip, Bob Mintzer	5:02
3.	"Summer Song"	Ferrante, Haslip	6:35
4.	"Small Town"	Ferrante, Haslip	6:31
5.	"A Walk in the Park"	Mintzer	5:21
6.	"Turn in Time"	Ferrante, Haslip	5:05
7.	"Father Time"	Mintzer	4:39
8.	"New Lullaby" (for Gabriela)	Haslip, Ferrante	4:34
9.	"Dreamland"	William Kennedy, Haslip, Ferrante	5:42
10.	"Take My Hand"	Kennedy, Ferrante	4:31

== Personnel ==
Yellowjackets

- Russell Ferrante – keyboards, programming
- Jimmy Haslip – bass, shop bass, programming
- Will Kennedy – drums, programming
- Bob Mintzer – programming, saxophones, bass clarinet, B♭ clarinet, horn arrangements (5)

Guest Musicians

- John Lehmkuhl – additional programming
- Luis Conte – percussion (1, 4)
- Bobby McFerrin – percussion (3), vocals (3)
- Chuck Findley – trumpet (1, 5, 7), trombone (5)

=== Production ===
- Yellowjackets – producers
- Malcolm Pollack – recording, mixing
- Rich Breen – additional engineer, digital transfers, vocal recording (3)
- Will Kennedy – additional engineer, digital transfers
- Richard Landers – assistant engineer
- Jeff Shannon – assistant engineer
- Brett Swain – assistant engineer
- Greg Calbi – mastering at Masterdisk (New York, NY)
- Sally G. Poppe – production coordinator
- Kim Briggs – art direction, design
- Lynn Green Root – illustration
- Caroline Greyshock – photography

== Charts ==
Chart (1995)	Peak position
US Top Contemporary Jazz Albums (Billboard)	12
