= Four Corners (album) =

Studio album by Yellowjackets
- Released: February 25, 1987
- Studio: Schnee (North Hollywood, California); Music Grinder Studios and Producers Studio (Hollywood, CA); The Complex (Los Angeles, California)
- Genre: Jazz
- Length: 48:03
- Label: MCA
- Producer: Yellowjackets; David Hentschel

Yellowjackets chronology
Shades (1986)	Four Corners (1987)	Politics (1988)

Professional ratings
Review scores
Source	Rating
AllMusic	4/5 stars

Four Corners is the fifth studio album of the American jazz group Yellowjackets, released in 1987. The album reached a peak position of number three on Billboard's Top Contemporary Jazz Albums chart. This was the first Yellowjackets album to feature Will Kennedy on drums.

== Track listing ==
No.	Title	Writer(s)	Length
1.	"Out of Town"	Russell Ferrante, Jimmy Haslip	5:02
2.	"Wildlife"	Ferrante, Haslip, Alex Acuña	6:03
3.	"Sightseeing"	Ferrante, Haslip	5:52
4.	"Open Road"	Ferrante	3:37
5.	"Mile High"	Ferrante, Haslip, Marc Russo, Will Kennedy, Bill Gable	4:12
6.	"Past Ports"	Ferrante	5:29
7.	"Postcards"	Ferrante, Haslip	5:28
8.	"Room with a View"	Ferrante	4:28
9.	"Geneva"	Haslip	2:24
10.	"Indigo"	Ferrante, Haslip, Russo, Kennedy	5:28

== Personnel ==
Yellowjackets

- Russell Ferrante – acoustic piano, all synthesizers
- Jimmy Haslip – 5-string bass, fretless bass, vocals (2)
- Will Kennedy – drums, percussion
- Marc Russo – alto saxophone, soprano saxophone

Additional musicians

- Gary Barlough – Synclavier programming
- Alex Acuña – percussion, vocals (2)
- Bill Gable – cello (2), additional percussion (2), vocals (3)
- Brenda Russell – vocals (2)
- Diana Acuña – vocals (2)

== Production ==
- Ricky Schultz – executive producer
- Yellowjackets – producers
- David Hentschel – producer, recording, mixing
- Dan Garcia – second engineer
- Andy Harper – second engineer
- Jon Ingoldsby – second engineer
- Sharon Rice – second engineer
- Bart Stevens – second engineer
- Stephen Marcussen – mastering at Precision Lacquer (Hollywood, California)
- Kathleen Covert – art direction
- John Coulter – design
- Lou Beach – front and back cover illustrations
- Bonnie Schiffman – photography

== Charts ==
Chart (1987)	Peak position
US Top Contemporary Jazz Albums (Billboard)	3
