= Blue hat =

Blue hat or Blue hats may refer to:

- BlueHat, Blue Hat or Blue-Hat, outside computer security firms bug testing a system prior to launch
- Blue hat, in de Bono's Six Thinking Hats
- Blue Hats, a 1997 album by Yellowjackets
