= Shades (Yellowjackets album) =

Studio album by Yellowjackets
- Released: 1986
- Studio: Bill Schnee Studio (North Hollywood, CA); Mad Hatter Studios (Los Angeles, CA)
- Genre: Jazz
- Length: 55:16 (CD)
- Label: GRP
- Producer: Yellowjackets

Yellowjackets chronology
Samurai Samba (1985)	Shades (1986)	Four Corners (1987)

Professional ratings
Review scores
Source	Rating
Allmusic	3/5 stars

Shades (1986) is the fourth studio album from the jazz group Yellowjackets. The album's first track, "And You Know That", won the "Best R&B Instrumental" Grammy Award. The album debuted on the Billboard Top Jazz Album chart on 5 July 1986 and would spend 32 weeks on the chart, eventually peaking at #4. It was the last to feature drummer Ricky Lawson.

The album features the original recording of the Yellowjackets' live staple "Revelation" (featuring vocal group Perri) as well as the Donald Fagen-penned title track. "Revelation" is one of the group's most popular tunes, often covered by other artists, including Robben Ford on his Talk to Your Daughter (1988).

== Track listing ==
No.	Title	Music	Length
1.	"And You Know That"	Ricky Lawson, Russell Ferrante	5:35
2.	"New Shoes"	Marc Russo, Ferrante	5:18
3.	"One Family"	Jimmy Haslip, Eric Marienthal, Ferrante	5:38
4.	"Revelation"	Ferrante, Lorraine Perry	5:13
5.	"Oasis"	Ferrante	5:27
6.	"Regular Folks"	Ferrante	5:03
7.	"Black Tie"	Ferrante	5:46
8.	"Sonja's Sanfona"	Haslip, Bill Gable	6:27
9.	"Shades"	Donald Fagen	5:15
10.	"Wildcats & Cougars"	Robben Ford, Haslip, Ferrante	5:34

== Personnel ==
Yellowjackets

- Russell Ferrante – keyboards
- Jimmy Haslip – 5-string bass, piccolo bass
- Ricky Lawson – acoustic drums, Simmons drums, percussion
- Marc Russo – alto saxophone

Guest musicians

- Rory Kaplan – Fairlight CMI programming
- Bill Gable – PPG Wave 2.3 programming (8)
- Bruce Hornsby – accordion (8)
- Paulinho da Costa – percussion
- Perri – vocals (4)

== Production ==
- Yellowjackets – producers
- Erik Zobler – engineer (basic tracks), mixing
- Gary Wagner – engineer (overdubs), mix consultant
- Duncan Aldridge – assistant engineer
- Gerry Brown – assistant engineer
- Larry Mah – assistant engineer
- Michael Ross – assistant engineer
- Brian Gardner – mastering
- Jeff Lancaster (L-Shape Ltd.) – art direction
- Dennis Keeley – photography
- Gerry Puhara – styling
- Gary Borman (Kragen & Co.) – management

Studios

- Recorded at Bill Schnee Studios and Mad Hatter Studios (Los Angeles, CA).
- Mixed at Soundcastle and Mama Jo's Recording Studio (Hollywood, CA).
- Mastered at Bernie Grundman Mastering (Hollywood, CA).

== Awards ==
1986 - 29th Annual GRAMMY Awards

Title	Category
"And You Know That"	Best R&B Instrumental Performance
