= Politics (Yellowjackets album) =

Studio album by Yellowjackets
- Released: 1988
- Studio: Schnee Studios (North Hollywood, California); The Complex (Los Angeles, California)
- Genre: Jazz
- Length: 49:20
- Label: GRP
- Producer: Yellowjackets; David Hentschel

Yellowjackets chronology
Four Corners (1987)	Politics (1988)	The Spin (1989)

Professional ratings
Review scores
Source	Rating
Allmusic	4/5 stars

Politics (1988) is the sixth studio album from the jazz group Yellowjackets. The album was awarded "Best Jazz Fusion Performance" at the 1989 Grammy Awards.

== Track listing ==
No.	Title	Writer(s)	Length
1.	"Oz"	Russell Ferrante, Jimmy Haslip, Marc Russo, Will Kennedy	4:44
2.	"Tortoise & the Hare"	Ferrante, Haslip, Russo	5:32
3.	"Local Hero"	Russo, Ferrante, Haslip	4:38
4.	"Galileo" (for Jaco)	Haslip	5:05
5.	"Foreign Correspondent"	Ferrante, Haslip, Russo, Kennedy	5:43
6.	"Downtown"	Ferrante	4:02
7.	"Helix"	Ferrante, Kennedy	4:57
8.	"Avance"	Ferrante	5:17
9.	"One Voice"	Ferrante	3:58
10.	"Evening Dance"	Ferrante	5:10

== Personnel ==
Yellowjackets

- Russell Ferrante – keyboards
- Jimmy Haslip – 5-string bass
- Will Kennedy – drums
- Marc Russo – saxophones

Guest Musicians

- Steve Croes – Synclavier
- Alex Acuña – percussion

== Production ==
- Ricky Schultz – executive producer
- Yellowjackets – producers
- David Hentschel – producer, recording, mixing
- Bart Stevens – assistant engineer
- Sharon Rice – mix assistant
- Stephen Marcussen – mastering at Precision Lacquer (Hollywood, California)
- Jeff Lancaster (L-Shape Ltd.) – art director
- Lou Beach – illustration
- Aaron Rapoport – photography
- Gary Borman – artist management

== Awards ==
1988 - 31st Annual GRAMMY Awards

Title	Category
Politics	Best Jazz Fusion Performance
