= The Spin =

Studio album by Yellowjackets
- Released: 1989
- Recorded: 1989
- Studios: Rainbow Studios (Oslo, Norway)
- Genre: Jazz fusion
- Length: 52:30
- Label: GRP
- Producer: Yellowjackets

Yellowjackets chronology
Politics (1988)	The Spin (1989)	Greenhouse (1991)

The Spin is an album by the American jazz band Yellowjackets, released in 1989. The album title refers to the Earth's rotation. The band supported the album with a North American tour.

The album was nominated for a Grammy Award, in the "Best Jazz Instrumental Performance, Group" category. It peaked in the top 10 on Billboard's Jazz Albums chart.

== Production ==
Yellowjackets had originally hoped to record The Spin with Claus Ogerman. Instead, the album was recorded in Oslo, Norway, in February 1989; it demonstrated a more acoustic sound than the band's previous efforts, relying less on synthesizers. Completed in three weeks, it was engineered by Jan Erik Kongshaug. The band sought to make the album as melodic as possible while still working within a traditional jazz setting.

Alex Acuña played percussion on the album.The Spin was the final album with saxophonist Marc Russo as a band member.

== Critical reception ==
Professional ratings
Review scores
Source	Rating
AllMusic	3/5 stars
Chicago Tribune	2.5/4 stars
The Virgin Encyclopedia of Eighties Music	3/5 stars

The Chicago Tribune wrote that The Spin "includes a few especially engaging cuts—'Storytellers' and a bebopish 'Whistle While You Walk', to name two—and some credible soloing by saxophonist Marc Russo." The Star Tribune noted the "more personal and more improvisational sound."

The Vancouver Sun concluded that "there is an intellectual coolness to some of this talented quartet's jazz instrumentals that is almost cold." The Austin American-Statesman determined that The Spin "won't be mistaken for classic acoustic jazz, but it is solidly rooted in a mainstream jazz sound, stressing its melodic elements over its rhythmic ones." The Houston Chronicle considered the album to be the band's best.

== Track listing ==
1. "Geraldine" (Russell Ferrante) - 6:00
2. "The Spin" (Ferrante, Jimmy Haslip, Marc Russo, Will Kennedy) - 4:22
3. "Storytellers" (Ferrante) - 6:10
4. "Prayer for El Salvador" (Ferrante) - 5:29
5. "Whistle While You Walk" (Ferrante) - 4:47
6. '"Enigma" (Ferrante, Haslip) - 4:23
7. "Dark Horses" (Barry Coates, Ferrante, Haslip) - 4:33
8. "Blues for Nikki" (Russo) - 3:56
9. "A Flower Is a Lovesome Thing/Hallucinations" (Billy Strayhorn/Bud Powell) - 8:01

Track 9 is available on the CD release only.

== Personnel ==
Yellowjackets

- Russell Ferrante – keyboards
- Jimmy Haslip – bass
- Will Kennedy – drums, percussion
- Marc Russo – saxophones

Guest Musicians

- Alex Acuña – percussion arrangements

== Production ==
- Yellowjackets – producers
- Jan Erik Kongshaug – engineer
- Stephen Marcussen – mastering at Precision Lacquer (Hollywood, California, USA)
- Dick Bouchard – design
- Jeff Lancaster – design
- Robin Ghelerter – illustrations
- Jim Bengston – photography
- Gary Borman – management
