= Yellowjackets (album) =

Studio album by Yellowjackets
- Released: June 1981
- Studios: Warner Bros. Recording Studios (North Hollywood, CA).
- Genre: Jazz fusion
- Length: 38:10
- Label: Warner
- Producer: Tommy LiPuma

Yellowjackets chronology
Yellowjackets (1981)	Mirage a Trois (1983)

Professional ratings
Review scores
Source	Rating
AllMusic	3/5 stars

Yellowjackets is the debut album by the American jazz group Yellowjackets issued in June 1981 by Warner Bros. Records. The album reached No. 16 on the Billboard Jazz Albums chart.

== Track listing ==
No.	Title	Music	Length
1.	"Matinee Idol"	Russell Ferrante	5:08
2.	"Imperial Strut"	Ferrante	5:25
3.	"Sittin' in It"	Ricky Lawson, Bobby Lyle	5:06
4.	"Rush Hour"	Ferrante, Robben Ford	5:13
5.	"The Hornet"	Jimmy Haslip, Ferrante	5:29
6.	"Priscilla"	Haslip, Ford, Chris Palmaro	5:11
7.	"It's Almost Gone"	Ferrante	6:00

== Personnel ==
Yellowjackets

- Russell Ferrante – keyboards
- Robben Ford – guitars
- Jimmy Haslip – bass
- Ricky Lawson – drums

Additional musicians

- Larry Williams – synthesizer programming, tenor saxophone, flute, horn arrangements
- Bobby Lyle – acoustic piano (3)
- Roland Bautista – guitars (3)
- Lenny Castro – percussion
- Paulinho da Costa – percussion
- Ernie Watts – tenor saxophone (1)
- Gary Herbig – tenor saxophone, flute
- Kim Hutchcroft – baritone saxophone, tenor saxophone
- Bill Reichenbach Jr. – trombone, horn arrangements
- Jerry Hey – trumpet, flugelhorn, flugelhorn solo (5)

== Production ==
- Producer – Tommy LiPuma
- Rhythm Tracks recorded by Lee Herschberg
- Additional Recording – Stuart Gitlin and Al Schmitt
- Assistant Engineer – Stuart Gitlin
- Mixed by Al Schmitt at Capitol Studios (Hollywood, California).
- Mix Assistant – Don Henderson
- Mastered by Mike Reese at The Mastering Lab (Hollywood, California).
- Production Coordinator – Noel Newbolt
- Art Direction and Design – Simon Levy
- Logo Design – Mike Manoogian
- Illustration – J. Daniel Chapman

== Charts ==
Chart (1981)	Peak position
Billboard Jazz Albums	16
Billboard 200	201
