= John Bernard Riley =

American jazz drummer and educator (born 1954)

John Riley
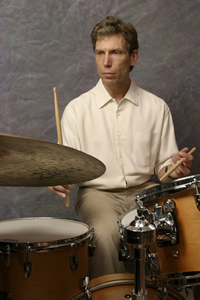
- Photo by R. Andrew Lepley (August 2004)

Background information
- Born: John Bernard Riley; June 11, 1954 (age 71); Aberdeen, Maryland, United States
- Genres: Jazz
- Occupations: Musician, educator
- Instruments: Drums, percussion
- Years active: 1968 – present
- Website: www.johnriley.org

John Bernard Riley (born June 11, 1954) is an American jazz drummer and educator. He has performed with Woody Herman, Stan Getz, Milt Jackson, Miles Davis, Dizzy Gillespie, John Scofield, Bob Mintzer, Gary Peacock, Mike Stern, Joe Lovano, Franck Amsallem, the Vanguard Jazz Orchestra, the Carnegie Hall Jazz Band, John Patitucci, and Bob Berg.

== Life ==
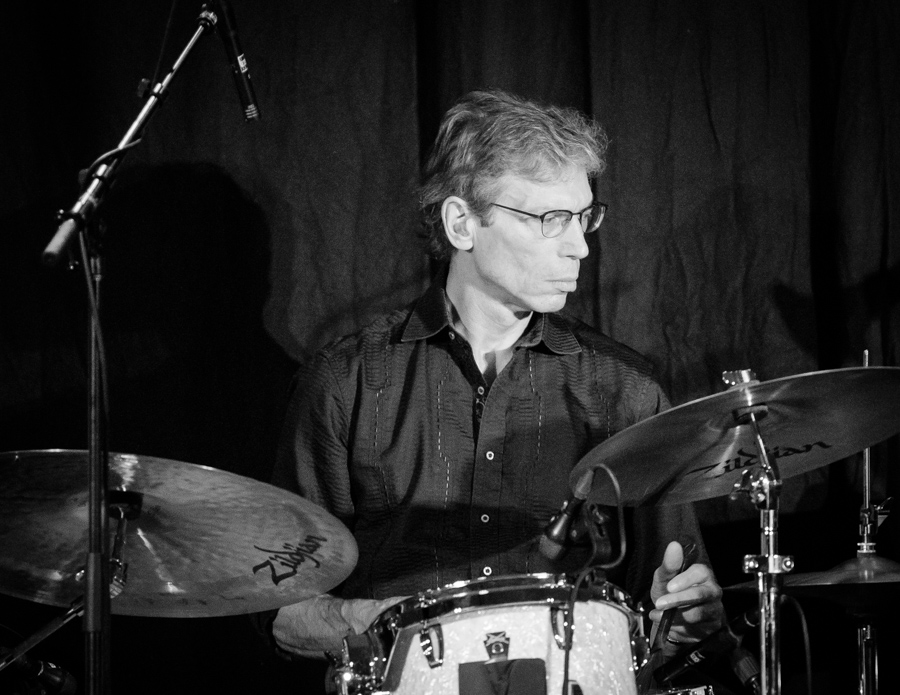
John Riley in Norway in 2017

Riley began playing drums at age eight, after receiving a snare drum as a gift. In the biographies provided to the media, Riley acknowledges the early support of his parents, John and Mary Ann. While attending fourth grade in Scotch Plains, New Jersey, Riley began studying percussion privately with Thomas Sicola, Jr. (b. Mar. 1944), who, at that time, was a recent graduate of the New York College of Music (bachelor of music) and a music teacher in the nearby Cranford Township Public Schools.

Riley studied music at the University of North Texas College of Music, where he was introduced to a larger world of music and percussion. While there, he played, toured, and recorded Lab 76 with the One O'Clock Lab Band. Lab 76 was nominated for a Grammy Award for "Best Jazz Performance by a Big Band." Jazz drummer Paul Guerrero was one of his influential teachers at North Texas.

== Discography ==
With Bob Mintzer

- Spectrum (DMP, 1987)
- Techno Pop (Jazz Door, 1987)
- Art of the Big Band (DMP, 1991)
- Departure (DMP, 1993)
- Only in New York (DMP, 1994)
- The First Decade (DMP, 1995)
- Big Band Trane (DMP, 1996)
- Latin from Manhattan (DMP, 1998)
- Homage to Count Basie (DMP, 2000)
- Live at MCG (MCG Jazz, 2004)
- Old School, New Lessons (MCG Jazz, 2006)

With Bobby Paunetto

- Composer in Public (RSVP, 1996)
- Reconstituted (RSVP, 2000)

With DMP Big Band

- Carved in Stone (DMP, 1995)
- DMP Big Band Salutes Duke Ellington (DMP, 1997)

With Eijiro Nakagawa and Jim Pugh

- Legend and Lion (Superkids, 2003)
- E2'n J2 (TNC, 2005)

With George Gruntz

- Liebermann Live in Berlin (TCB, 1999)
- Merryteria (TCB, 1999)
- Expo Triangle (MGB, 2000)
- News Reel Matters (2015)

With Hubert Nuss

- The Shimmering Colours of Stained Glass, (GreenHouse, 1997)
- The Underwater Poet (Greenhouse, 2002)
- Feed the Birds (Pirouet, 2005)

With Luis Bonilla

- I Talking Now (Planet Arts, 2009)
- Twilight (Planet Arts)

With Mike Metheny

- Blue Jay Sessions (Headfirst, 1981)
- Kaleidoscope (MCA, 1988)

With Vanguard Jazz Orchestra

- Lickety Split (New World, 1997)
- Thad Jones Legacy (New World, 1999)
- Can I Persuade You? (Planet Arts, 2001)
- The Way, (Planet Arts, 2004)
- Up from the Skies (Planet Arts, 2006)
- Monday Night Live at the Village Vanguard (Planet Arts, 2008)
- Forever Lasting, Live in Tokyo (Planet Arts, 2010)

With others

- University of North Texas: Lab 76 (UNT Jazz, 1976)
- Woody Herman: The Woody Herman Orchestra (JazzDoor, 1978)
- Harris Simon Group, Swish (East Wind, 1980)
- Richard Boukas: Embarcadero (Jazz Essence, 1983)
- Richard Lacona: Painter of Dreams (Morningside, 1984)
- Mike Carubia: Renaissance (KamaDisc, 1985)
- Greg Hyslop: Manhattan Date (Slope, 1986)
- Richard Lacona (The Bad Little Big Band): A Long Way To Go (Morningside, 1986)
- Mark Soskin: Overjoyed (JazzCity, 1987)
- Red Rodney Quintet: Red Snapper and One for Bird (SteepleChase, 1988)
- Haze Greenfield: Five for the City (Owl Time Line, 1989)
- John Scofield: Live Three Ways (Blue Note Video, 1990)
- Kenny Werner: Uncovered Heart (Sunnyside, 1990)
- John Hart: One Down (Blue Note, 1990)
- Miles Davis and Quincy Jones: Miles and Quincy Live at Montreux (Warner Bros., 1991)
- Bruce Williamson: Big City Magic Timeless, 1993)
- John Serry: Enchantress (Telarc, 1995)
- Claudio Angeleri: Jazz Files (CDPM-Lion, 1996)
- Joseph Allessi: New York Legends (Cala, 1996)
- Lalo Schifrin: Gillespiana (Aleph, 1996)
- Shigeko Suzuki: Brisa (BMG, 1996)
- Sigurdur Flosason: Sounds from Afar (Jazziz, 1996)
- Vince Mendoza and the WDR Big Band (de): Flame (Carlton, 1996)
- Michael Davis: Brass Nation (Hip-Bone, 2000)
- Ludwig Nuss: Ups and Downs (Mons, 2003)
- Todd Coolman: Perfect Strangers (ArtistShare, 2008)
- Randy Sandke: Jazz for Juniors (Arbors, 2009)
- Steve Hobbs: Vibes, Straight Up (Challenge, 2009)
- Daniel Jamieson's Danjam Orchestra: Sudden Appearance, (Origin, 2010)
- John Hyde Quartet: John Hyde Quartet (Death Defying, 2010)
- Nicolas Folmer: Off the Beaten Tracks, Vol. 1 (PID, 2010)
- Pavel Wlosok, Mike McGuirk, John Riley aka Wlosok/McGuirk/Riley Trio: Jubilee Suite: Live at the Grey Eagle, New Port Line, Prague (2012)
- Ralf Buschmeyer: Jazz Speak (2012)
- Dick Oatts/Mats Holmquist (sv) New York Jazz Orchestra: A Tribute to Herbie +1 (Summit 2015)

== DVD ==
- John Scofield: Live Three Ways, Blue Note, 2005
- David Liebman: Teaches and Plays, Jamey Aebersold Jazz, 2005
- John Riley: The Master Drummer How to Play Practice and Think like a Pro, Alfred Music, 2009

== Academic positions ==
- Faculty, Manhattan School of Music since 1986
- Faculty, Kutztown University of Pennsylvania
- Artist-in-residence, Amsterdam Conservatory

== Publications ==
- Brazilian Rhythms for Drumset, (Book & CD), by Duduka da Fonseca and John Riley, Alfred Publishing (November 1, 1993) ISBN 0-7692-0987-4
- The Art of Bop Drumming, Alfred Publishing (July 11, 1994) ISBN 0-89898-890-X
- Beyond Bop Drumming, Alfred Publishing (March 17, 1997) ISBN 1-57623-609-9
- The Jazz Drummer's Workshop, Modern Drummer (January 1, 2005) ISBN 0-634-09114-X
- The Master Drummer (DVD), Alfred Publishing (April 1, 2009)

== See also ==
- List of drummers
- Manhattan School of Music
- Zildjian
