= Time Squared =

Time Squared may refer to:

- Time Squared, three graphic novels by Howard Chaykin
- "Time Squared" (Star Trek: The Next Generation), the 39th episode of the television series Star Trek: The Next Generation
- Time Squared Academy High School, a Rhode Island high school specializing in mathematics, engineering, and science
- Time Squared (album), a 2003 album by American jazz group Yellowjackets
