= Homage to Count Basie =

Studio album by Bob Mintzer Big Band
- Released: October 17, 2000
- Recorded: May 16–17, 2000
- Genre: Jazz, big band
- Length: 61:12
- Label: DMP
- Producer: Bob Mintzer

Bob Mintzer chronology
Quality Time (1998)	Homage to Count Basie (2000)	Bop Boy (2002)

Homage to Count Basie is an album by the Bob Mintzer Big Band that won the Grammy Award for Best Large Jazz Ensemble Album in 2002.

== Track listing ==
No.	Title	Writer(s)	Length
1.	"Havin' Some Fun"	Bob Mintzer	7:55
2.	"April in Paris"	Vernon Duke/Yip Harburg	6:07
3.	"One O'Clock Jump"	Count Basie	11:16
4.	"Lester Jumps Out"	Bob Mintzer	9:19
5.	"Cute"	Neal Hefti	5:56
6.	"Shiny Stockings"		7:44
7.	"Home Basie"	Bob Mintzer	4:11
8.	"Lil' Darlin'"	Neal Hefti	8:44

== Personnel ==
- Bob Mintzer – clarinet, flute, baritone saxophone, tenor saxophone, liner notes, producer
- Lawrence Feldman – clarinet, flute, alto saxophone
- Pete Yellin – clarinet, flute, alto saxophone
- Scott Robinson – clarinet, flute, tenor saxophone
- Roger Rosenberg – baritone saxophone
- Bob Millikan – flugelhorn, trumpet
- Byron Stripling – flugelhorn, trumpet
- Scott Wendholt – flugelhorn, trumpet
- Michael Philip Mossman – flugelhorn
- Michael Davis – trombone
- Larry Farrell – trombone
- Keith O'Quinn – trombone
- Dave Taylor – bass trombone
- Phil Markowitz – piano
- Dennis Irwin – double bass
- James Chirillo – guitar
- Brian Brake – drums
- John Riley – drums
- Tom Jung – producer, engineer, recorder
- Mark Conese – assistant engineer
