= Ricky Lawson =

American drummer (1954–2013)

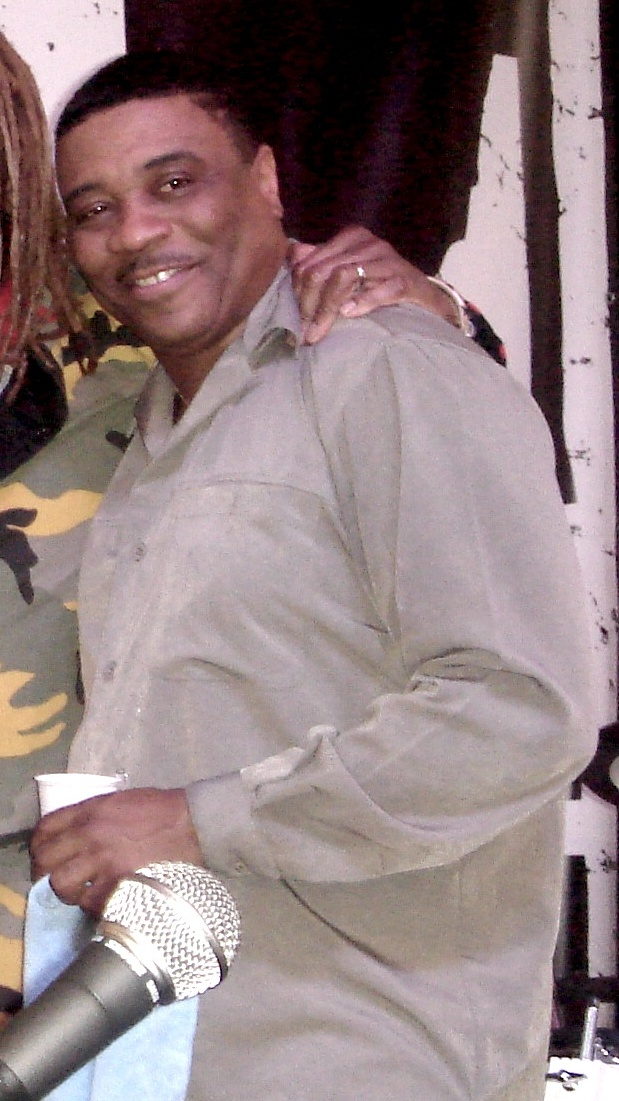
- Lawson in 2006

Background information
- Born: William Riser III; November 8, 1954; Detroit, Michigan, U.S.
- Died: December 23, 2013 (aged 59) Long Beach, California, U.S.
- Occupations: Musician, composer
- Instrument: Drums
- Formerly of: Michael Jackson; Eric Clapton; Phil Collins; Whitney Houston; Bee Gees; Earth, Wind & Fire

William Riser III (November 8, 1954 – December 23, 2013), better known as Ricky Lawson or Ricky Remo, was an American drummer and composer. A native of Detroit, Michigan, he worked extensively as a session musician, collaborating with Stevie Wonder, Michael Jackson, Eric Clapton, Phil Collins, Whitney Houston, Steely Dan, Earl Klugh, Kenneth "Babyface" Edmonds and other artists. He co-founded the jazz-fusion band Yellowjackets and won the 1987 Grammy Award for Best R&B Instrumental Performance for "And You Know That" from their album Shades.

== Life and career ==
Lawson started playing drums at the age of sixteen. He would borrow his uncle's drum set and carry it to his house across town via the Detroit bus system. In high school, Lawson played in his high school jazz band, which consisted of only five members, including the director. Lawson played for The Sons of Soul, who performed at the 1969 Michigan State Fair, opening for The Jackson Five along with The Blazer, a band from Cooley High School in Detroit that included La Palabra. Lawson grew up with fellow musician and future Michael Jackson collaborator Greg Phillinganes.

Also in high school, he played such sports as water polo and swimming. His swimming talent eventually earned him a scholarship to college. He only spent one year at college, being invited to play drums for Stevie Wonder. In the '80s and '90s, he played drums for Michael Jackson and Whitney Houston. He played on Whitney's famous hit, "I Will Always Love You". Lawson has a one note "solo" in the song, where he hits the toms before Whitney's dramatic vocal finale. He said that this was his favorite solo of his career.

In addition to the artists listed above, Lawson collaborated with Quincy Jones, Bette Midler, Russell Ferrante, Al Jarreau, George Benson, Lionel Richie, and George Duke. He also co-authored the Pointer Sisters' hit "Uh-Uh", and co-produced their album Serious Slammin' and the Fattburger hit "Good News".

He was the drummer for Michael Jackson's Bad Tour in 1987–1989 and Dangerous Tour in 1992–1993. He was the drummer for Phil Collins' Both Sides of the World Tour in 1994–1995 and The Trip into the Light World Tour in 1997. He also performed with Phil Collins on MTV Unplugged in 1994.

Lawson appeared Kenneth "Babyface" Edmonds' MTV Unplugged live album and DVD in 1997. In 1999, he played for Michael Jackson again on his "MJ & Friends" concerts in Seoul and Munich. He also appeared on Steely Dan's studio album Two Against Nature, as well as their live album and tour DVD, Two Against Nature: Steely Dan's Plush TV Jazz-Rock Party. He toured with Steely Dan in 2000 and 2003. In late 2003 at the "Night of the Proms" concerts held in Europe, he filled in for Toto drummer Simon Phillips, who was unable to perform.

Lawson became disoriented while performing at the Spaghettini jazz club on December 13, 2013, in Seal Beach, California. He was diagnosed with a brain aneurysm and treated at Long Beach Memorial Medical Center. He died on December 23, 2013, aged 59, when he was removed from life support after ten days.

In one of his final studio recordings, Lawson appears on 8 of 13 tracks of well-known bassist and Fourplay founding member Nathan East's eponymous album, released in March 2014. The album dedication In memory of Ricky Lawson appears as the final statement in the liner notes.

== Solo album ==
In 2001, Lawson released the solo album Ricky Lawson and Friends, on which he performed, arranged, produced, and wrote all of the songs in collaboration with leading artists Gerald Albright, Phil Collins, George Duke, Sheila E., Nathan East, Donald Fagen, Jon Herington, Robben Ford, James Ingram, Boney James, Al Jarreau, Kirk Whalum, Vesta Williams, and others. The album is a blend of R&B, pop, and jazz.

== Christmas album ==
In 2008, Lawson put together a classic Christmas CD, Christmas with Friends, with special guests Ron Reinhardt and Philippe Saisse on acoustic piano, Rick Braun on trumpet, Richard Elliot, Michael Paulo, and Steve Alaniz on sax, Paul Brown, Adam Hawley and Iam Keene on guitar, Lenny Castro on percussion, Roberto Vally and Sekou Bunch on bass.

== Discography ==
=== With Yellowjackets ===
- 1981: Yellowjackets
- 1983: Mirage a Trois
- 1985: Samurai Samba
- 1986: Shades

=== As leader ===
- 1997: First Things 1st
- 2001: Ricky Lawson and Friends
- 2008: Christmas with Friends

=== As sideman ===
- 1975: Mystic Voyage (Roy Ayers Ubiquity)
- 2000: Two Against Nature (Steely Dan)
- 2014: Nathan East
