= Yellowjackets (band) =

American jazz fusion band

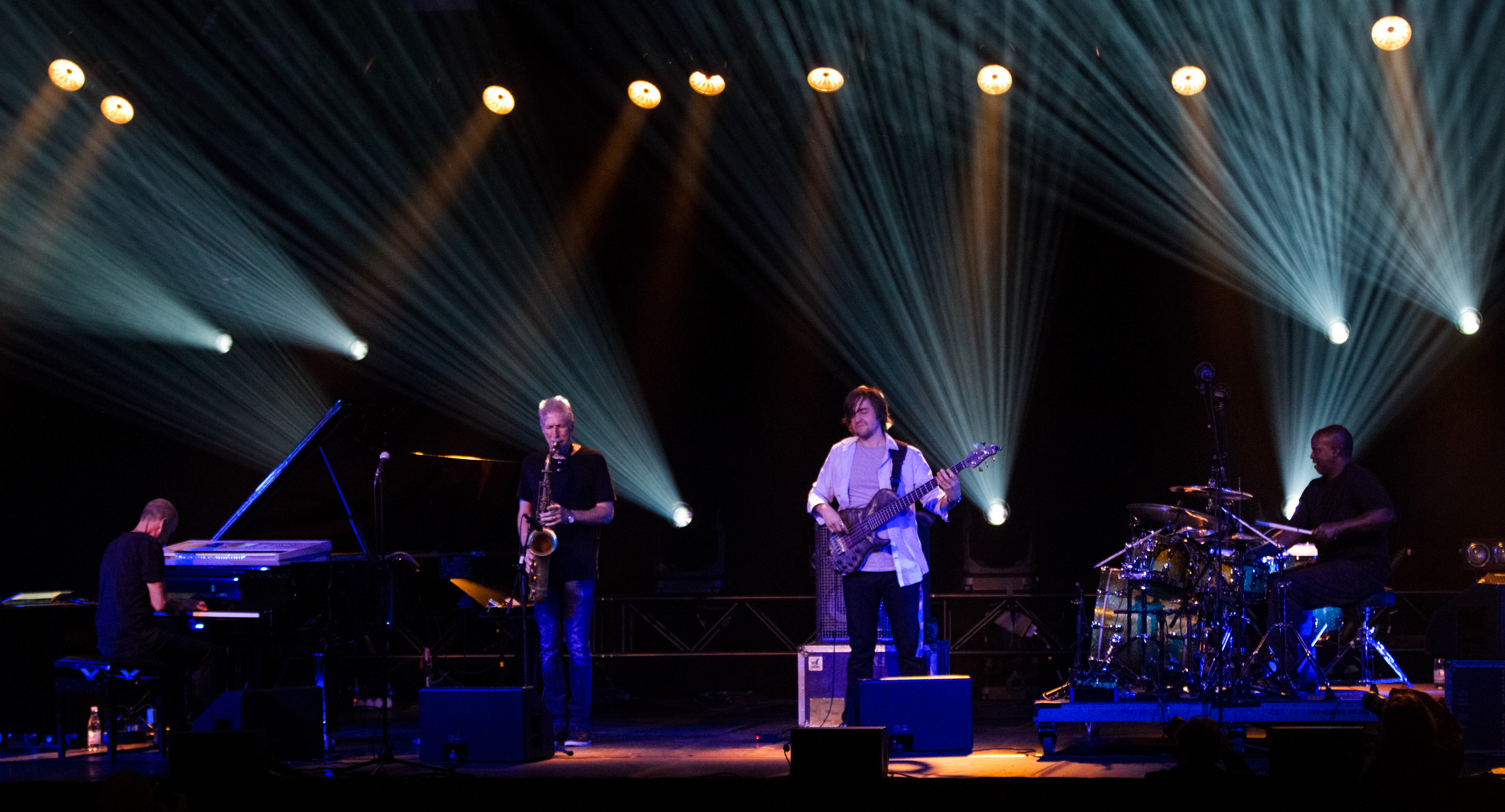
- Leverkusener Jazztage, 2015

Background information
- Origin: Los Angeles, California, U.S.
- Genre: Jazz fusion
- Years active: 1977–present
- Labels: MCA; GRP; Heads Up; Mack Avenue Records; Warner Bros.
- Members: Russell Ferrante; Bob Mintzer; Will Kennedy; Dane Alderson
- Past members: Robben Ford; Jimmy Haslip; Ricky Lawson; Michael Landau; Mike Miller; Marc Russo; Peter Erskine; Terri Lyne Carrington; Marcus Baylor; Felix Pastorius
- Website: yellowjackets.com

Yellowjackets is an American jazz fusion band founded in 1977 in Los Angeles, California.

== History ==
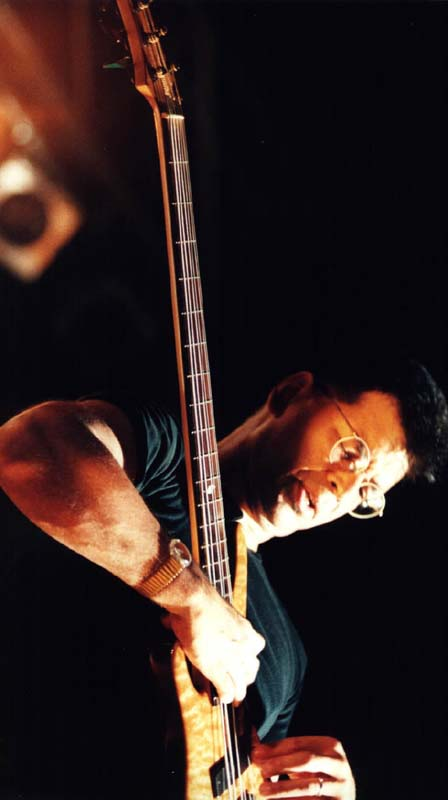
Jimmy Haslip performs at the Liri Blues Festival, Italy, in 2000.

In 1977, guitarist Robben Ford, for his first solo album, recruited keyboardist Russell Ferrante, electric bassist Jimmy Haslip and drummer Ricky Lawson. They continued as a group and were signed to Warner Bros. Records by producer Tommy LiPuma, who chose the name "Yellowjackets" from a list of potential group names the band had compiled.

In 1984, the band's second album, Mirage a Trois, was nominated for a Grammy Award for Best Fusion Performance. Ford played on only half this album, and after he departed the group, saxophonist Marc Russo was hired in his place. The next album, Shades, reached No. 4 on the Billboard magazine jazz album chart, while the single "And You Know That" won a Grammy for Best R&B Instrumental Performance. Lawson left and was replaced by Will Kennedy in 1987. Their next three albums, Four Corners, Politics, and The Spin, all received Grammy nominations for Best Jazz Fusion Performance. With Russo leaving the band in 1990, Bob Mintzer replaced him for the album Greenhouse, which reached No. 1 on the Billboard Contemporary Jazz Album chart. Mintzer has remained a band member.

The Yellowjackets celebrated their 30th anniversary in 2011 with the album Timeline for Mack Avenue. When Haslip took an extended hiatus, he was replaced by Felix Pastorius (son of bassist Jaco Pastorius). The band released A Rise in the Road with Pastorius. On some of the songs, Pastorius played the fretless bass guitar made famous by his father.

In addition to their studio albums, the Yellowjackets contributed two tracks to the soundtrack of the film Star Trek IV: The Voyage Home in 1986.

== Awards and honors ==
Grammy Awards

- R&B Instrumental Performance: "And You Know That" (1987)
- Jazz Fusion Performance: Politics (1989)

Grammy nominations

- Jazz Fusion Performance: Mirage a Trois (1984), Four Corners (1987)
- Contemporary Jazz Performance: Greenhouse (1992), Like a River (1994), Run for Your Life (1995), Dreamland (1996), Club Nocturne (1999)
- Contemporary Jazz Album: Mint Jam (2003), Time Squared (2004), Lifecycle (2009)
- Jazz Instrumental Performance: The Spin (1990)
- Instrumental Composition: "Claire's Closet", Russell Ferrante (2009), "Civil War", Bob Mintzer (2014)
- Best Large Jazz Ensemble Album: Jackets XL with the WDR Big Band (2022)
- Best Jazz Instrumental Album: Fasten Up (2026)

== Members ==
=== Current members ===
- Russell Ferrante – keyboards, synthesizers (1977–present)
- William Kennedy – drums, percussion (1987–1999, 2010–present)
- Bob Mintzer – saxophones, bass clarinet, EWI (1991–present)
- Dane Alderson – bass (2015–present)

=== Former members ===
- Jimmy Haslip – bass (1977–2012)
- Ricky Lawson – drums (1977–1987; died 2013)
- Robben Ford – guitar (1977–1983)
- Mike Miller – guitar (1983; died 2025)
- Michael Landau – guitar (1985)
- Marc Russo – saxophones (1985–1989)
- Peter Erskine – drums (1999–2000)
- Terri Lyne Carrington – drums (2000)
- Marcus Baylor – drums (2000–2010)
- Felix Pastorius – bass (2012–2015)

== Discography ==
- 1981 Yellowjackets (Warner Bros.)
- 1983 Mirage a Trois (Warner Bros.)
- 1985 Samurai Samba (Warner Bros.)
- 1986 Shades (GRP)
- 1987 Four Corners (MCA)
- 1988 Politics (MCA)
- 1989 The Spin (MCA)
- 1991 Greenhouse (MCA)
- 1992 Live Wires (GRP) – live rec. 1991
- 1993 Like a River (GRP) – rec. 1992
- 1994 Run for Your Life (GRP)
- 1995 Dreamland (Warner Bros.)
- 1995 Bobby McFerrin, Bang!Zoom (Blue Note)
- 1997 Blue Hats (Warner Bros.)
- 1998 Club Nocturne (Warner Bros.)
- 2001 Mint Jam (Heads Up) – live
- 2003 Time Squared (Heads Up)
- 2003 Peace Round: A Christmas Celebration (Heads Up)
- 2005 Altered State (Heads Up)
- 2006 Twenty-Five (Heads Up)
- 2008 Lifecycle (Heads Up)
- 2011 Timeline (Mack Avenue)
- 2013 A Rise in the Road (Mack Avenue)
- 2016 Cohearence (Mack Avenue)
- 2018 Raising Our Voice (Mack Avenue)
- 2020 Jackets XL with WDR Big Band (Mack Avenue) – nominated for 64th Annual Grammy Awards
- 2022 Parallel Motion (Mack Avenue)
- 2025 Fasten Up (Mack Avenue) – nominated for 68th Annual Grammy Awards

== See also ==
- List of jazz fusion musicians
