= Marilyn Scott =

American jazz musician (born 1949)

Marilyn Scott (born December 21, 1949) is an American jazz vocalist.

== Biography ==
Born in Altadena, California, Scott got her start performing locally at age 15. She went to college in San Francisco, singing in both jazz and pop ensembles there. She was noticed by Emilio Castillo, a member of Tower of Power, who hired her to do backing vocals for the group. This led to further work as a session musician in Los Angeles, working with Spyro Gyra, The Yellowjackets, Hiroshima, Etta James, and Bobby Womack. She also appeared in a production of Selma, about the life of Martin Luther King Jr.

Scott's first single was a cover of Brian Wilson's "God Only Knows", which was a hit in the U.S. and was followed with the 1979 full-length Dreams of Tomorrow. Her 1991 release Without Warning was critically acclaimed among jazz writers. Her duet with Bobby Caldwell, "Back To You", was a hit in Japan, and she toured that country following its success.

She signed with Warner Bros. Records in 1996 for the album Take Me With You, which featured Dori Caymmi, George Duke, Russell Ferrante, Ricardo Silvera, Boney James, Bob James, and Jimmy Haslip.

== Discography ==
=== Albums ===
- Dreams of Tomorrow (Atco, 1979) U.S. No. 189, U.S. Jazz No. 47
- Without Warning! (Mercury, 1983)
- Sky Dancing (Bandai/Sin-Drome [Japan], 1991)
- Smile (Sin-Drome, 1992) U.S. Contemporary Jazz No. 23
- Take Me With You (Warner Bros., 1996)
- Avenues of Love (Warner Bros., 1998)
- Walking With Strangers (Prana, 2001)
- Nightcap (Prana, 2004) U.S. Jazz No. 10
- I'm in Love Once Again (Expansion [UK], 2005) compilation
- Handpicked [compilation] (Prana, 2005) U.S. Contemporary Jazz No. 15
- Innocent of Nothing (Prana, 2006)
- Every Time We Say Goodbye (Venus/Prana [Japan], 2008)
- Get Christmas Started! (Prana, 2014)
- Standard Blue (Prana, 2017)
- The Landscape (Blue Canoe, 2022)

=== Charting singles ===
- "God Only Knows" (Big Tree/Atlantic, 1977), Billboard Hot 100 No. 61
- "Starting to Fall" (1998), U.S. AC No. 25
- "The Last Day" (1998), U.S. AC No. 19
- "Don't Let Love Get Away" (2002), U.S. AC No. 27

=== Soundtrack appearances ===
- "I Only Have Eyes for You" (1988) from Twins (Epic)
