= Electronic wind instrument =

Musical instrument

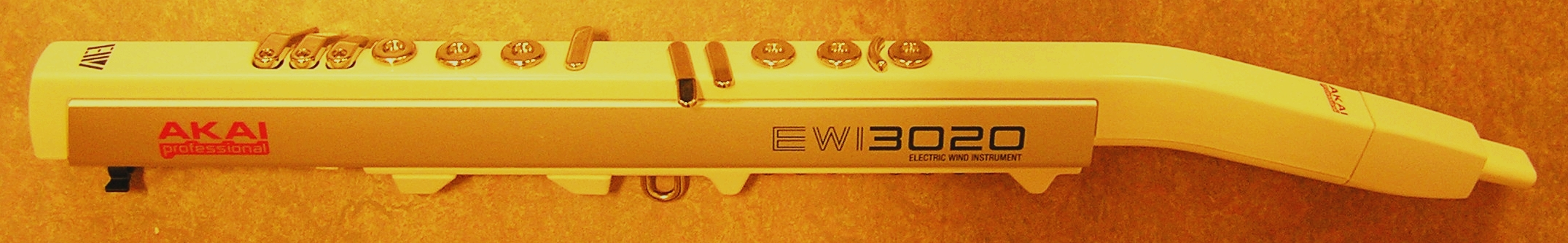
An EWI

EWI (from electronic wind instrument, /ˈiːwi/ EE-wee) is a type of wind controller, an electronic musical instrument invented by Nyle Steiner. The EWI has been used by many artists across many different genres, and is notable for its association with jazz fusion, particularly in Japan with its frequent use by T-Square members Takeshi Itoh and Masato Honda.

== History ==
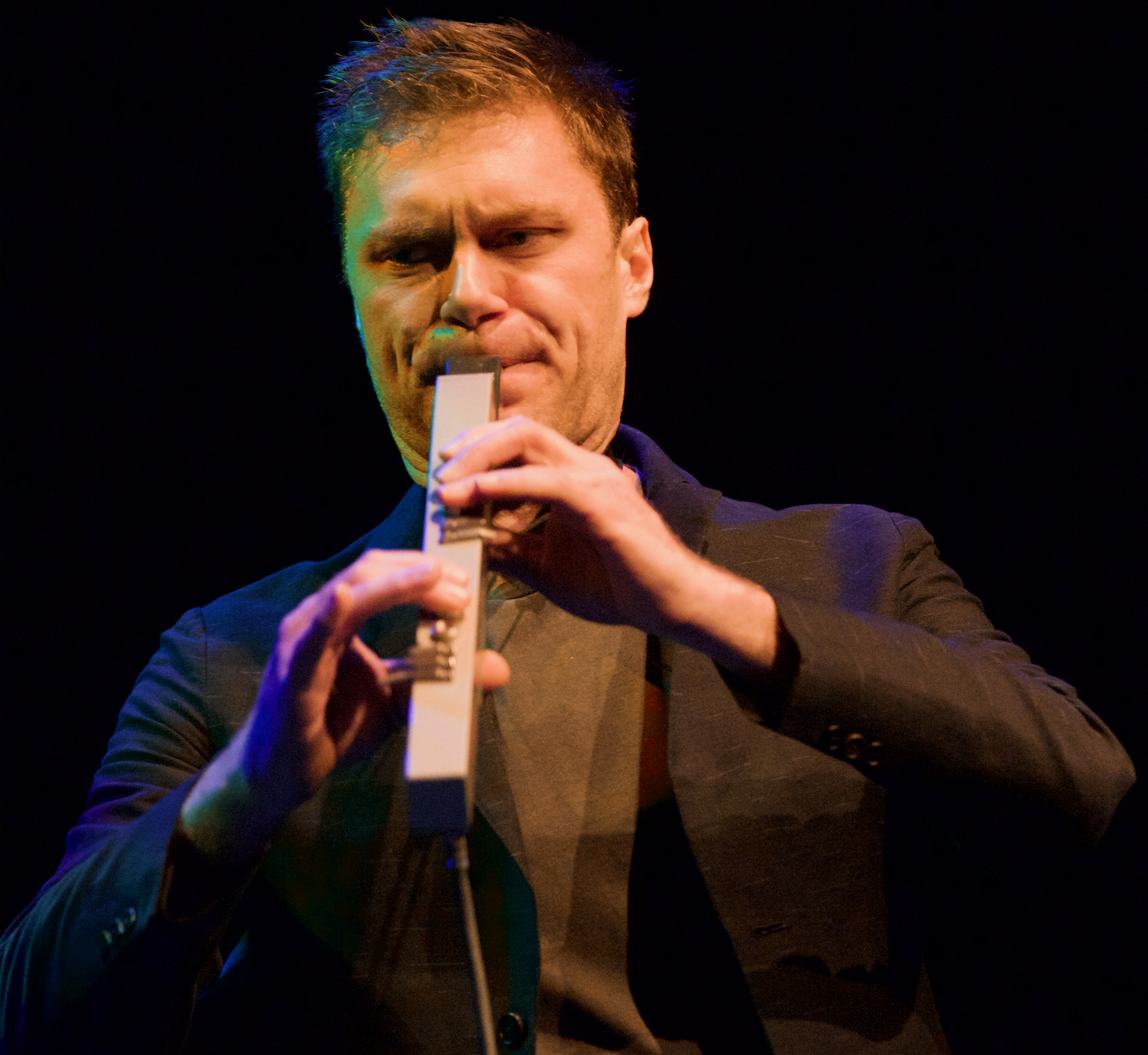
Chase Baird with an EWI1000

The EWI was invented by Nyle Steiner, his second electronic wind instrument design. Steiner originally brought to market a brass style fingering analogue wind synthesizer instrument known as the EVI in the 1970s. Steiner then went on to develop the EWI which had a unique fingering system closer to the woodwind style. These instrument designs first working models appeared in the 1970s, with the EWI appearing commercially during the early 1980s.

== Operation ==
EWI models can control external synthesizers or other MIDI instruments, either simultaneously or instead of the synthesizers that come with the instrument. Earlier EWIs require the external box unit, while the discontinued (as of 2019) EWI4000s and still currently available EWI5000 have built-in MIDI outputs. The EWI SOLO, released in 2020 has a USB connector and built in speaker at the end, styled to look like the bell of a soprano saxophone. In 2021 a small volume (cottage industry) company Berglund also makes its own original variations on classic Steiner EVI and EWI designs, approved and demonstrated by Nyle Steiner himself. The Berglund designs offer MIDI over wireless, unlike the current Akai products (as of 2022). Wireless MIDI can be achieved on the Akai models with unofficial third party add on products at lower cost, albeit in a somewhat DIY fashion.

Any EWI can play software synthesizers running on a computer.

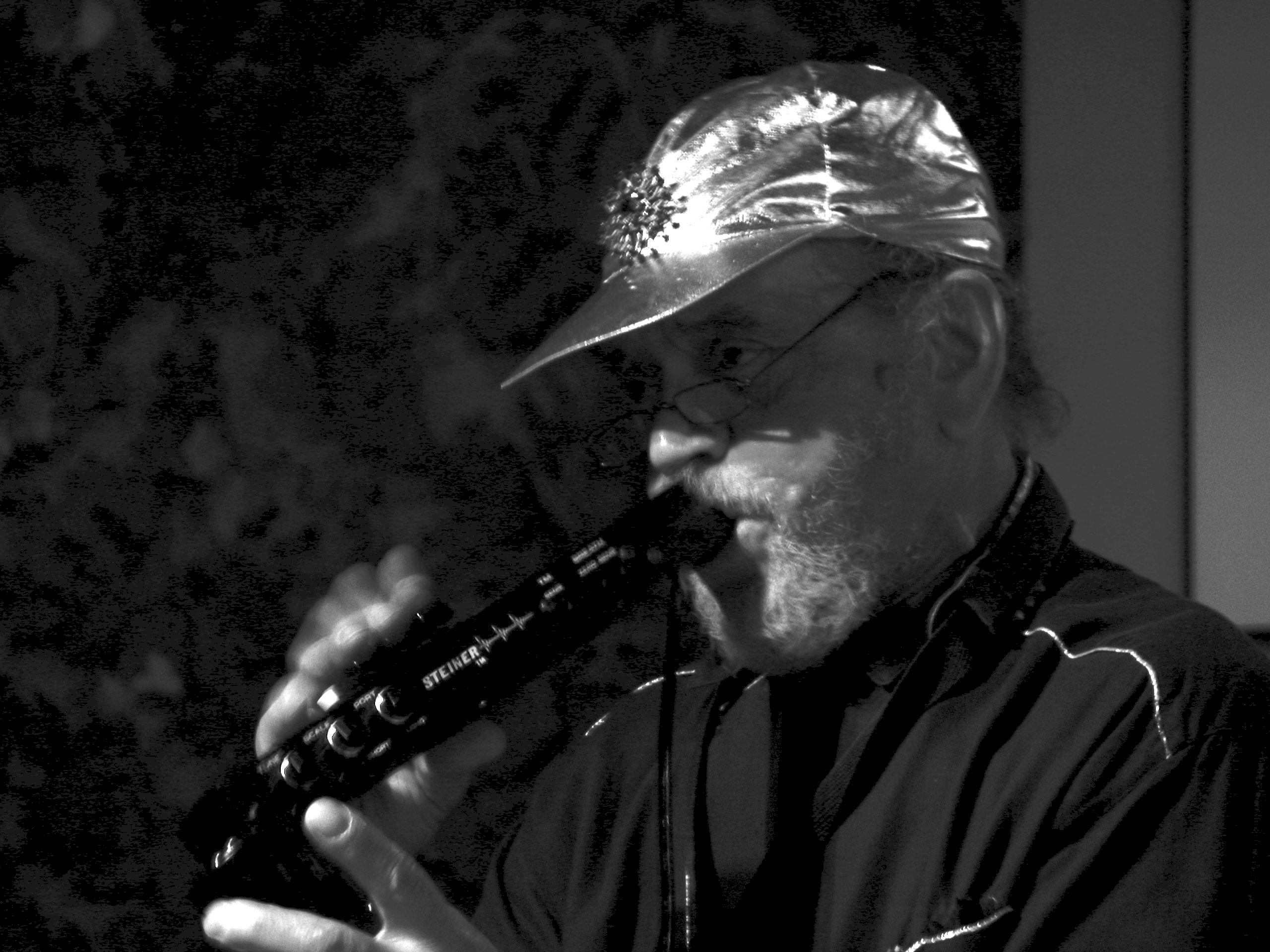
Marshall Allen, playing a Steiner EVI

The early models of EWI and EVI (a EWI with trumpet fingering) consisted of two parts: a wind controller and a digitally-controlled analog synthesizer in a rackmount box (which also houses the instrument's electronics). Akai took over the EVI and EWI instruments from Steiner and released several models with his help. Today Akai only makes designs based around the EWI, having dropped the less commercially successful EVI. The current Akai models EWI5000, and EWI SOLO contain built-in sample-based digital synthesizers and don't strictly require an external box. Akai also offered the EWI USB (discontinued as of 2022), a five-octave MIDI controller that connects directly to a Mac or Windows computer via USB and uses software for control.

== Fingering system ==
EWIs, depending on the brand (Akai or Berglund; the latter referred to as NuRad), can use the Boehm fingering system used by most woodwind instruments, or other fingerings, like that of the recorder or tin whistle. The instrument feels somewhat like a soprano saxophone or clarinet, except that its keys are activated by touch rather than being depressed (i.e. the player's fingers don't rest on the keys).

Nyle Steiner's EWI fingering was novel because it does not operate as an acoustic instrument. Instead of closing or opening a hole, each EWI key acts as a pitch modifier that can change note values by plus or minus a half step or whole step. As a result, fingerings that are similar to that of a Boehm instrument, but many other alternate fingers are possible on EWI that are not possible on acoustic instruments. This gave Steiner's invention flexibility yet remains familiar to woodwind players.

Later generation EWIs can be switched to flute, oboe, and saxophone fingering modes. The EWI Solo, EWI 5000, and EWI USB also have an electronic valve instrument (EVI) fingering mode that allows brass players to play the EWI. Like a straight soprano saxophone or clarinet, the EWI is straight with a slight inward bend a few inches below the mouthpiece, and it is held in front of the body with a neck strap.

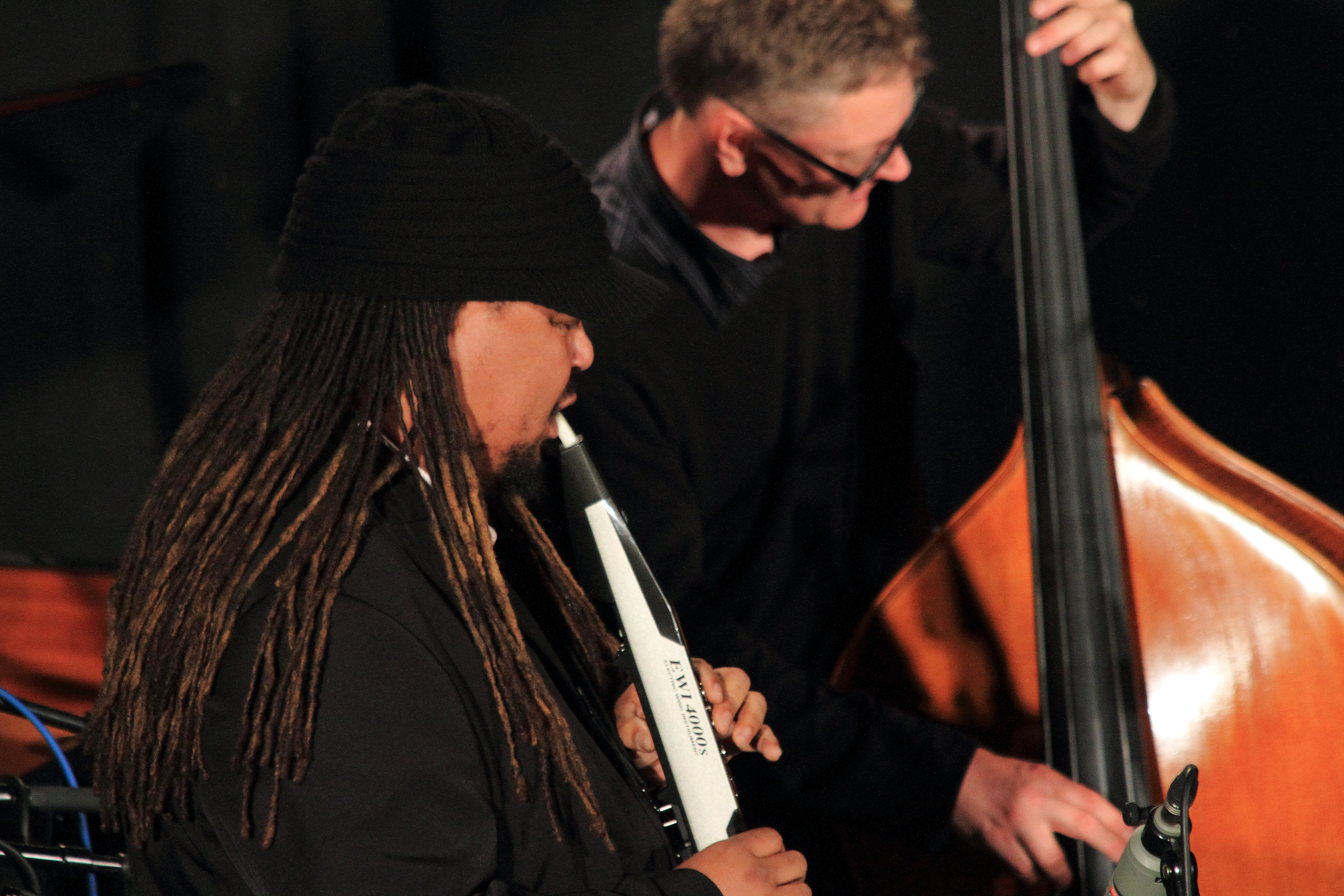
Dayna Stephens with an EWI 4000s

The EWI has a silicone mouthpiece with sensors for air pressure (sending MIDI Breath Control by default) and bite pressure (which sends vibrato, more specifically a quick pitch up-down "blip" by default, but can also be routed to modulation or other CC controls of the player's preference). EWI keys do not move, instead, they sense when fingers are touching them through body capacitance. Owing to the touch capacitive switches and breath and bite sensors, the instrument is highly responsive, though the instrument's sensitivity does not appeal to all players.

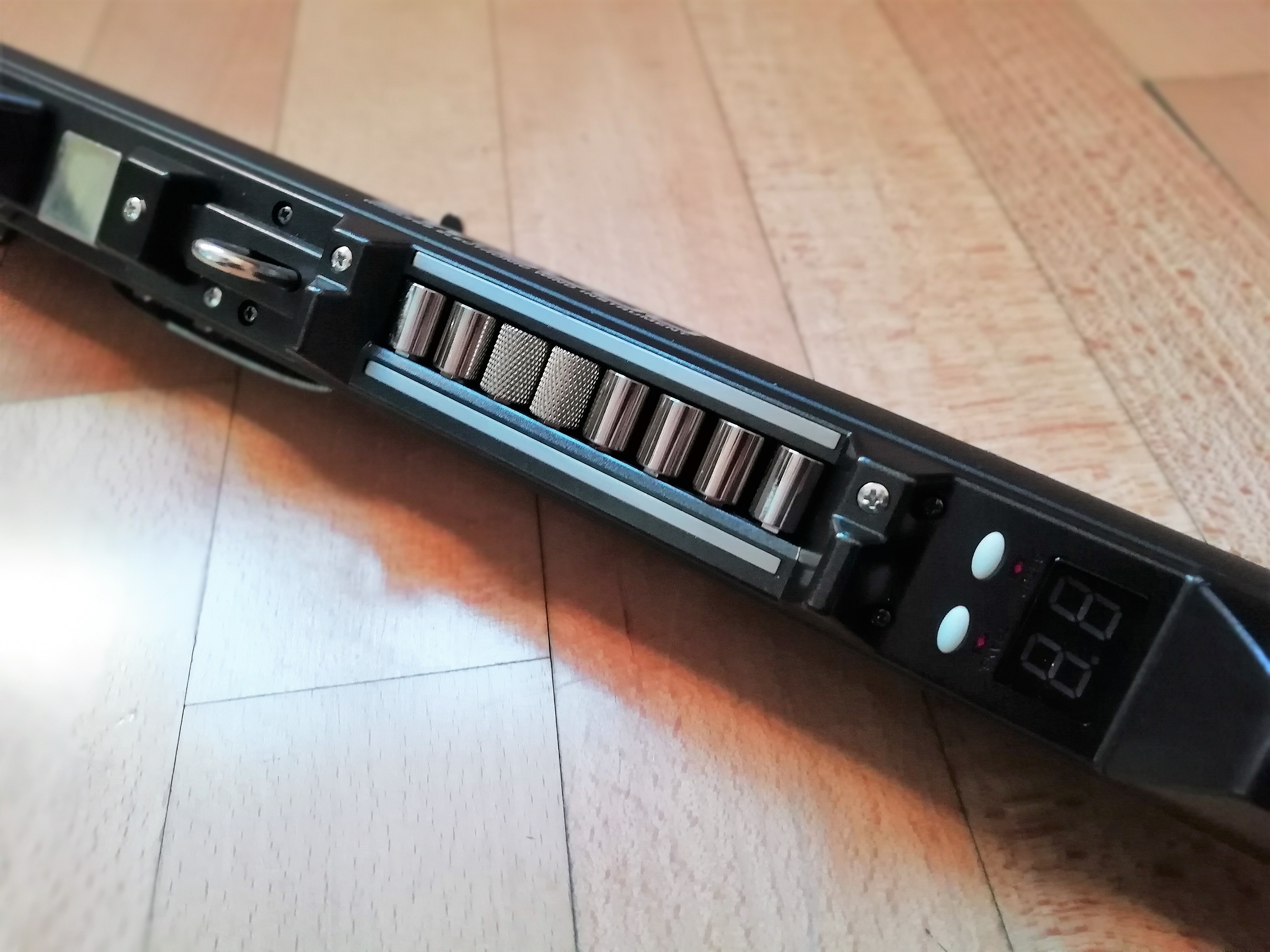
Plate, neck strap and octave rollers on an EWI 5000

Unlike acoustic wind instruments, the fingering is identical in every octave. The current octave is determined by putting your left thumb between any two of the four to eight rollers (*depending on model), and also by rolling the thumb to the ends of the EWI USB roller track to achieve the fifth octave from just the four-octave rollers on that model. Touching a plate next to the rollers sends portamento by default (this portamento strip is not on the EWI USB). EWIs also have pitch bend up and down plates all operated by the right thumb. The latest EWI known as Solo only has pitch bend down plate so the player has to scoop up from the bottom pitch down plate before blowing a note for an upwards pitch bend which will be of a more limited range compared to all the other twin bend plate EWI models; this sacrifice apparently made as the thumb hold at the same position also supports the greater weight of the instrument. The Solo however has seen the addition of a dedicated F# key to the EWI key sensors. A key not seen before on previous EWI models, which should be welcome for players using the saxophone fingering mode instead of traditional EWI.

== Notable players ==
- Michael Brecker
- Takeshi Itoh
- Masato Honda
- Bob Mintzer
- Steve Tavaglione
- Darren Barrett
- John Daversa
- John Swana
- Seamus Blake
- Chase Baird
- Bobby Stern
- Jeff Kashiwa
- Everette Harp
- Richard Elliot
- Candy Dulfer
- Yucco Miller
- Chad Lefkowitz-Brown
- Laura Intravia
- Jørgen Munkeby
- Courtney Pine
- Marshall Allen
- Wenzl McGowen
- John L. Walters
- Joseph Shabason
- André 3000
