= Bob Mintzer =

American jazz saxophonist, composer, and band leader (born 1953)

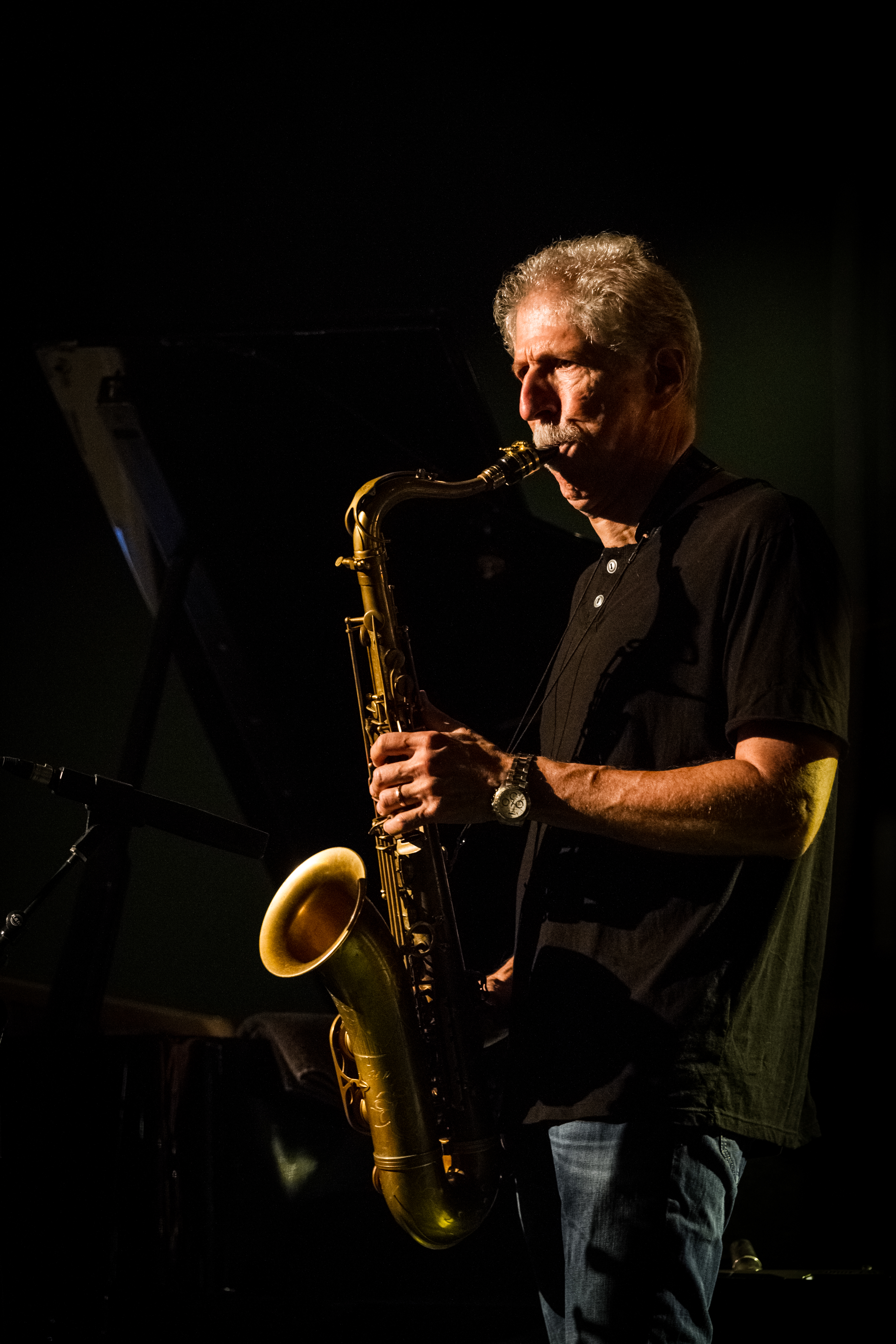
- Mintzer in 2015

Background information
- Born: Robert Alan Mintzer; January 27, 1953 (age 73); New Rochelle, New York, US
- Genres: Jazz, jazz fusion
- Occupations: Musician, composer, arranger, band leader
- Instruments: Saxophone, EWI, bass clarinet
- Labels: DMP, Novus, MCG Jazz

Robert Alan Mintzer (born January 27, 1953) is an American jazz saxophonist, composer, arranger, and big band leader.

== Early life ==
Mintzer was born and raised in a Jewish family in New Rochelle, New York, on January 27, 1953. He attended the Interlochen Arts Academy, Michigan from 1969 to 1970, then was at the Hartt School of Music, Hartford, Connecticut for two years, before attending the Manhattan School of Music from 1972 to 1974.

== Later life and career ==
Early in his career, Mintzer played in various big bands, including those led by Buddy Rich (1975–77), Thad Jones and Mel Lewis (1977–79), and Sam Jones (1978–80). While with Rich, he began writing big-band music, and has since composed and arranged hundreds of pieces. In 2008, Mintzer and his family moved to Los Angeles, where he joined the faculty of the University of Southern California.

The Grammy-winning saxophonist and composer Bob Mintzer played a significant role in Jaco Pastorius' iconic Word of Mouth Big Band in the early 1980s.Mintzer was a core member of both the large and small ensemble configurations of the Word of Mouth band from 1981 to 1982, contributing on tenor sax and bass clarinet, as well as handling composing and arranging duties. He was heavily featured on Pastorius' acclaimed 1983 live album, Invitation, and notably toured with the group performing classics like "The Chicken" and "Donna Lee". Mintzer later honored his former bandleader by composing and releasing an entire tribute album in 1992, titled I Remember Jaco.

He is a member of the Grammy award-winning Yellowjackets and holds the Buzz McCoy endowed chair of jazz studies at the University of Southern California.

In 2014, he began sharing the role of Chief Conductor of the WDR Big Band in Cologne, Germany with Vince Mendoza.

== Discography ==
=== As leader ===
- Source (Agharta, 1982)
- Horn Man (Agharta, 1982)
- Papa Lips (Eastworld, 1983)
- Incredible Journey (DMP, 1985)
- Camouflage (DMP, 1986)
- Spectrum (DMP, 1988)
- Urban Contours (DMP, 1989)
- Hymn (Owl, 1991) – rec. 1990
- Art of the Big Band (DMP, 1991)
- I Remember Jaco (Novus, 1992)
- One Music (DMP, 1991)
- Departure (DMP, 1993)
- Only in New York (DMP, 1994)
- Twin Tenors (Novus, 1994)
- The First Decade (DMP, 1995)
- Big Band Trane (DMP, 1996)
- Live at the Berlin Jazz Festival (Basic, 1996) – rec. 1987
- Latin from Manhattan, (DMP, 1998)
- Quality Time (TVT, 1998)
- Homage to Count Basie (DMP, 2000)
- Bop Boy (Explore, 2002)
- Gently (DMP, 2002)
- Live at MCG with Special Guest Kurt Elling, (MCG Jazz, 2004)
- Hymn (Mesa, Blue Moon, Owl, Universal, 1992, 2006)
- Old School: New Lessons featuring Kurt Elling, (Telarc/MCG Jazz, 2006)
- Longing (EmArcy, Owl, Universal, Sunnyside, 2003, 2006, 2007)
- In the Moment (Art of Life, 2007)
- Universal Syncopations, Vol. 2 (ECM, 2007)
- Swing Out, (Telarc/MCG Jazz, 2008)
- La Vita e Bella (Abeat, 2009)
- Canyon Cove, (2010)
- The Hudson Project (Concord Midline/Stretch/Universal, 2011)
- For the Moment, (MCG Jazz, 2012)
- Get Up (MCG Jazz, 2015)
- All L.A. Band (Fuzzy, 2016)
- Meeting of Minds with New York Voices (MCG Jazz, 2018)

=== As co-leader ===
With Peter Erskine, Darek Oleszkiewicz, Alan Pasqua

- Standards 2: Movie Music (Fuzzy Music, 2010)

=== As a member ===
Yellowjackets

- Greenhouse (MCA, 1991)
- Live Wires (GRP, 1992) – live
- Like a River (GRP, 1993)
- Runferyerlife (GRP, 1994)
- Collection (1995)
- Dreamland (Warner Bros., 1995)
- Blue Hats (Warner Bros., 1997)
- Club Nocturne (Warner Bros., 1998)
- Priceless Jazz Collection (1998)
- The Best of Yellowjackets (1999)
- Mint Jam (2002)
- Time Squared (2003)
- Peace Round (2003)
- Altered State (2005)
- Twenty Five (2006)
- Lifecyle featuring Mike Stern (2008)
- Timeline (2011)
- A Rise in the Road (2013)
- Cohearance (2016)
- Raising Our Voice featuring Luciana Souza (2018)

The GRP All-Star Big Band

- GRP All Star Big Band: GRP All-Star Big Band (GRP, 1992)
- GRP All-Star Big Band: Dave Grusin Presents GRP All-Star Big Band Live!, (GRP, 1993)
- GRP All-Star Big Band: All Blues, (GRP, 1995)

=== As sideman ===
- Buddy Rich, Buddy Rich (PolJazz, 1977) – live
- Sam Jones, Something New (Interplay, 1979)
- Jaco Pastorius, Invitation (Warner Bros., 1983) – live rec. 1982
- Bobby McFerrin, Bang!Zoom (Blue Note, 1995)
- Nova Bossa Nova, Jazz Influence (Arkadia Jazz, 1997)
- Toninho Horta, From Ton to Tom (Video Arts Music, 1998)
- Miroslav Vitouš, Universal Syncopations II (ECM, 2007) – rec. 2004–05
- New York Voices, A Day Like This (MCG Jazz, 2007)
- The Sean J. Kennedy Quartet, Queen Anne's Revenge (Lost World, 2007)
- Tohpati, Save the Planet (Ethnomission, 2010)
- Kurt Elling, The Gate (Concord, 2011) – rec. 2010
- Chico Pinheiro (musician), There's a Storm Inside (Sunnyside Records, 2010)
- Kait Dunton, Mountain Suite (Real & Imagined, 2012)
- Dewa Budjana, Joged Kahyangan (Moonjune, 2013)
- Roberto Tola, Bein' Green (RT Music, 2017)
- Denis Krupin, Path To Light (2021)
- Michel Cury, Night Travel (2024)
