= Jimmy Haslip =

American electric bass player & record producer (born 1951)

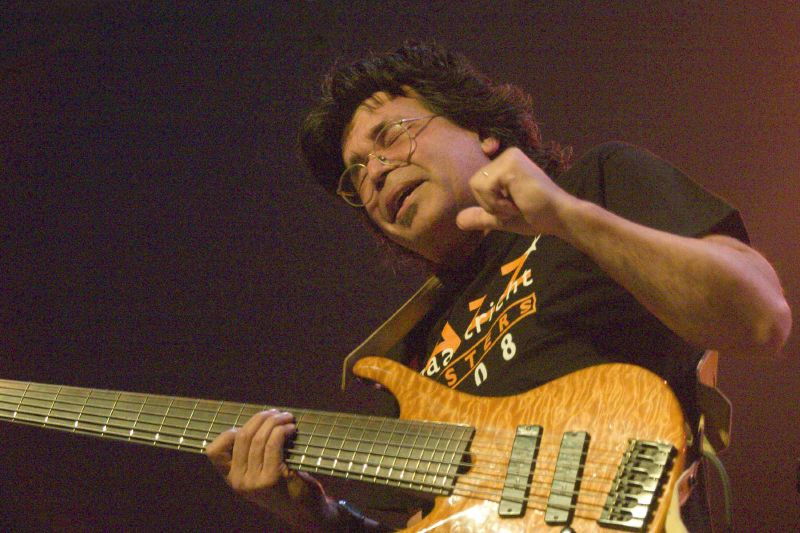
- Haslip performing in 2008

Background information
- Born: James Robert Haslip; December 31, 1951 (age 74); Bronx, New York City, New York, U.S.
- Genres: Jazz fusion, world, rock, R&B, heavy metal
- Occupations: Musician, composer, producer
- Instrument: Bass guitar
- Years active: 1977–present
- Label: Heads Up
- Website: jimmyhaslipbass.com

James Robert Haslip (born December 31, 1951) is an American bass guitarist who was a founding member of the jazz fusion group the Yellowjackets, which he left in 2012. He was also an early user of the five-string electric bass.

== Early life and career ==
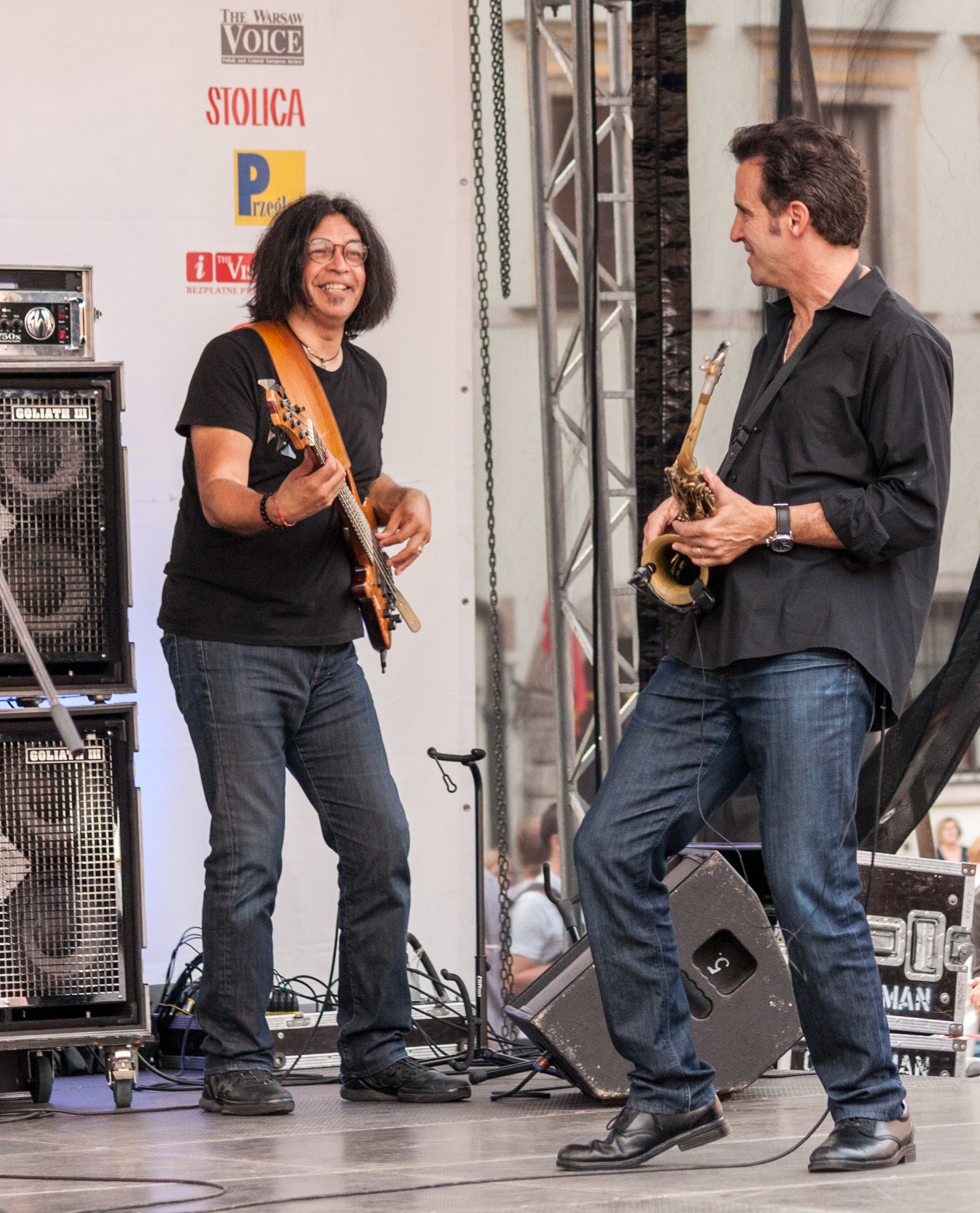
Jimmy Haslip with Eric Marienthal in 2012

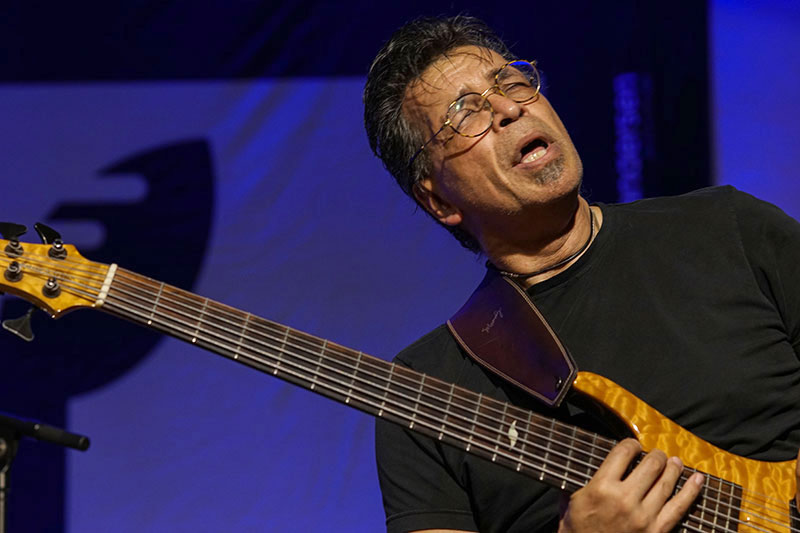
Jimmy Haslip at Jazzy Days Festival in Denmark 2018

Born in the New York City to Puerto Rican immigrants, Spanish was Haslip's first language and he learned to speak English in kindergarten. His father, James Joseph (Jaime) Haslip (1915–1999) served in the United States Customs Service, beginning as a Merchant Marine until moving to patrolman and eventually deputy commissioner, marrying Jimmy's mother Virginia (Viera) Haslip (1912–2009) in 1937.

Haslip moved to Huntington, New York when he was four years old. At age seven, he began playing drums and then moved onto other instruments such as trumpet and tuba until playing bass at age 15. Although he took music lessons and went to a private music school, he considers himself self-taught. He has said that he went to a local music shop with his father and purchased a right-handed bass (he is left-handed) and learned to play it upside down (without restringing).

In an interview with magazine JazzTimes, Haslip said he was surrounded by music as a young boy, from visiting nightclubs and concert venues to his peers. He explains that there was music in his house as well, from his older brother Gabriel listening to classic jazz, his father listening to Latin and orchestra jazz and his aunt listening to "sappy stuff like Jerry Vale and Johnny Mathis". In high school, Haslip created his first band called Soul Mine with his high school classmates, playing soul music at school dances and parties.

In the early 1970s Haslip played with New York glam band Street Punk, he toured alongside musicians, and moved to Los Angeles in 1976, where he played with guitarists Tommy Bolin and Harvey Mandel. in addition to the Yellowjackets, he has worked with Jeff Lorber, Eric Marienthal, Bruce Hornsby, Rita Coolidge, Gino Vannelli, Kiss, Tommy Bolin, Allan Holdsworth, Marilyn Scott, Chaka Khan, Al Jarreau, Donald Fagen, and Anita Baker.

Haslip has released two solo albums: Arc, in 1993, and Red Heat, with Joe Vannelli, in 2000. He was active with the Yellowjackets between 1977 and 2012. He was part of a combo with Allan Holdsworth, Alan Pasqua, and Chad Wackerman. Other collaborations include Jing Chi (with Robben Ford and Vinnie Colaiuta) and Modereko. Haslip was a member of the rock group Blackjack from 1979–1980 with Bruce Kulick, Sandy Gennaro, and Michael Bolton. He also toured with guitarist Allan Holdsworth and drummer Virgil Donati.

In 2012, Haslip took a year-long hiatus from Yellowjackets, which later turned permanent. Haslip wanted to devote more time to his family and other musical projects. He was replaced in Yellowjackets by Felix Pastorius, the son of Jaco Pastorius. Haslip stated he wanted to devote more time to his family and other musical project, and also added there was no animosity between himself and the other members of Yellowjackets.

== Influences ==
Haslip has cited James Jamerson, Paul McCartney, Chris Squire, Peter Cetera, Jack Bruce, Noel Redding, Jack Casady, Phil Lesh, Berry Oakley, Ron Carter, Scott LaFaro, Jimmy Garrison, Reggie Workman, Jaco Pastorius, and Anthony Jackson as influences on his playing.

== Personal life and interests ==
In a 1997 article, Haslip mentioned he has been a vegetarian since 1972 and leads a healthy life and enjoys exercising. He also said he has lost some of his music idols and mentors to drugs and violence including fellow bass player Jaco Pastorius.

In 2001, Haslip performed at a benefit concert for Union Station Foundation, a Pasadena, California-based organization for the homeless, alongside actors Hector Elizondo and Jeff Goldblum. Haslip also released a compilation album called "Junction" with all the proceeds going to the Union Station Foundation.

Haslip has a wife named Nancy, and they have three children. Haslip is also a fan of sports including football and baseball.
