= The Layers =

EP by Julian Lage
- Released: March 17, 2023
- Studios: The Bridge Studios, Brooklyn, NY; Joe's Garage, Brooklyn, NY (mixing); Sterling Sound, NYC (mastering)
- Genre: Jazz
- Length: 24:51
- Labels: Blue Note; B003689401
- Producer: Margaret Glaspy

Julian Lage chronology
| View with a Room (2022) | The Layers (2023) | Speak to Me (2024) |

The Layers is a studio EP by American jazz guitarist Julian Lage. It was released on March 17, 2023, through Blue Note Records. It is a direct companion—which Lage considers a "prequel"—to the previous View with a Room, including six songs cut during the recording sessions from that earlier date. It features the same musicians as the prior, with bassist Jorge Roeder, drummer Dave King, and guest guitarist Bill Frisell.

Lage described his purpose for the EP:

"At its core, The Layers is a prequel to View with a Room ... It has all the musical seeds that grew into what I consider the touchstones of View with a Room—a duo with Bill, a duo with Jorge, more atmospheric and expansive writing, Dave and Jorge's incredible rhythmic and orchestrational sensibilities. View with a Room is a comprehensive look at these musical qualities we were so excited to explore in the studio, and The Layers offers a distillation of the various relationships within the ensemble and production team. Taken as a whole, The Layers has a heartbeat all of its own."

== Reception ==
Professional ratings
Review scores
| Source | Rating |
|---|---|
| AllMusic | 3.5/5 stars |
| The Guardian | 4/5 stars |
| Jazzwise | 3/5 stars |
| UK Vibe | 5/5 stars |

Thom Jurek of AllMusic wrote, "The music on The Layers offers a run time of barely 25 minutes; further, it closely echoes its predecessor."

The Glide Magazine review said, "There's a palpable and potent chemistry between Lage, Frisell, Roeder and King, one the foursome utilizes to judicious and purposeful effect."

The Guardian's Neil Spencer stated, "While possessing the same entrancing quality as its predecessor, The Layers is still sparser, with few of the Americana flavours that the much-travelled Frisell previously helped bring ... [it] proves a captivating creation, but at under 30 minutes seems a little frugal by comparison."

Selwyn Harris of Jazzwise wrote, "it has the feel of a work-in-progress demo with themes a little on the sketchy side. Yet it's one that highlights the gentle, more intimate side to Lage's distinctive aesthetic ... The Layers is still entirely characteristic of this most warmly communicative of hip contemporary guitar stylists", though, "You won't find here the kind of modernist and soul-jazz influences and more solo-y stuff of previous albums."

UK Vibe magazine commented, "There's an ethereal, other-worldly vibe to Lage's playing, and along with the deeply attuned performances of Roeder and King, it's a quietly charismatic session that imbues a sense of calm and inner beauty. Add to this the sensitive accompaniment of Frisell and what we have is one of the most original, distinctive and captivating albums of the year." The author was also critical of the EP's short run time.

== Track listing ==
All tracks are written and arranged by Julian Lage.

| No. | Title | Length |
|---|---|---|
| 1. | "Everything Helps" | 4:12 |
| 2. | "Double Southpaw" | 3:02 |
| 3. | "Missing Voices" | 5:34 |
| 4. | "This World" | 4:19 |
| 5. | "Mantra" | 4:01 |
| 6. | "The Layers" | 3:43 |
| Total length: | | 24:51 |

== Personnel ==
Musicians

- Julian Lage – acoustic and electric guitars
- Bill Frisell – acoustic and electric guitars (all except 2)
- Jorge Roeder – acoustic bass (all except 4)
- Dave King – drums (1, 3, 5, 6)

Technical

- Margaret Glaspy – producer
- Armand Hirsch – additional production (3–5)
- Mark Goodell – recording engineer, mixing
- Amon Drum, Greg Tock, Urosh Jovanovich – assistant recording engineer
- Joe Nino-Hernes, Randy Merrill – mastering

== See also ==
- View with a Room
