= Squint (Julian Lage album) =

Studio album by Julian Lage
- Released: June 11, 2021
- Genre: Jazz
- Length: 45:00
- Label: Blue Note
- Producer: Margaret Glaspy; Armand Hirsch

Julian Lage chronology
| Love Hurts (2019) | Squint (2021) | View with a Room |

Squint is an album by American jazz guitarist Julian Lage, released on June 11, 2021, through Blue Note Records.

== Critical reception ==
Professional ratings
Review scores
| Source | Rating |
|---|---|
| AllMusic | 4/5 stars |
| AllAboutJazz | 4/5 stars |

Squint was well received by critics. Philip Lutz from Downbeat stated that the album is "a singularly modern take on Blue Note tradition, showcasing tunes that both reference classic styles and function as forward-facing vehicles for improvisation, [Lage's] transcendent gift".

Chris May from AllAboutJazz states that "Lage excels throughout Squint as both an improviser and a composer, and he is well served by bassist Jorge Roeder and drummer Dave King [...]. From every angle, and from start to finish, the album is a delight."

John Bungey from UK Jazz News states that Lage "can sound flawlessly melodic as on the opening solo Etude; he can sound bluesy as on the swaggering Boo's Blues or Twilight Surfer. Almost always the mood is breezy and amiable – even when negotiating the tricky angles of the Ornette Coleman-inspired Familiar Flower."

== Track listing ==
Squint track listing
| No. | Title | Writer(s) | Length |
|---|---|---|---|
| 1. | "Etude" | Julian Lage | 2:28 |
| 2. | "Boo's Blues" | Julian Lage | 3:26 |
| 3. | "Squint" | Julian Lage | 4:30 |
| 4. | "Saint Rose" | Julian Lage | 4:36 |
| 5. | "Emily" | Johnny Mandel | 5:29 |
| 6. | "Familiar Flower" | Julian Lage | 4:00 |
| 7. | "Day and Age" | Julian Lage | 3:16 |
| 8. | "Quiet like a Fuse" | Julian Lage | 6:54 |
| 9. | "Short Form" | Julian Lage | 3:32 |
| 10. | "Twilight Surfer" | Julian Lage | 4:19 |
| 11. | "Call of the Canyon" | Billy Hill | 3:13 |
| Total length: | | | 45:00 |

== Personnel ==
Musicians

- Julian Lage – electric guitar
- Jorge Roeder – double bass
- David King – drums

Technical

- Margaret Glaspy – production
- Armand Hirsch – production
