= View with a Room =

Studio album by Julian Lage
- Released: September 16, 2022
- Studio: The Bridge, Brooklyn, New York
- Genre: Jazz; post bop
- Length: 43:12
- Label: Blue Note; B003528001
- Producer: Margaret Glaspy

Julian Lage chronology
Squint (2021)	View with a Room (2022)	The Layers (2023)

Singles from View with a Room
- 1. "Auditorium" Released: June 21, 2022; 2. "Word for Word" Released: July 13, 2022; 3. "Tributary" Released: August 10, 2022; 4. "Chavez" Released: August 31, 2022

View with a Room is an album by American jazz guitarist Julian Lage. It was released on September 16, 2022, through Blue Note Records.

== Reception ==
Professional ratings
Review scores
Source	Rating
All About Jazz	4/5 stars
AllMusic	4/5 stars
Jazzwise	4/5 stars
PopMatters	8/10

Thom Jurek of AllMusic noted, "the two guitarists entwine, creating a striking, yet gentle lyricism amid airy textures".

== Track listing ==
All tracks are written by Julian Lage, except where noted.

No.	Title	Writer(s)	Length
1.	"Tributary"		5:47
2.	"Word for Word"		3:15
3.	"Auditorium"		4:28
4.	"Heart Is a Drum"		3:31
5.	"Echo"	Lage; Jorge Roeder	4:52
6.	"Chavez"		4:19
7.	"Temple Steps"		3:58
8.	"Castle Park"		3:57
9.	"Let Every Room Sing"		5:10
10.	"Fairbanks"		3:55
Total length:			43:12

== Personnel ==
Musicians

- Julian Lage – electric guitar
- Bill Frisell – electric guitar (1, 3, 5, 6, 9, 10), electric baritone guitar (7)
- Jorge Roeder – acoustic bass
- Dave King – drums

Technical

- Margaret Glaspy – producer
- Armand Hirsch – additional production
- Mark Goodell – engineer, mixing
- Randy Merrill – mastering
- Aaron Sawyer, Hannah Boren – management
- Amon Drum, Greg Tock, Urosh Jovanovich – assistant
- Ali Hedrick, Anna Katharina Erhart, Jakob Flarer, Karl Morse – booking
- Todd Gallopo – art direction, design

== See also ==
- The Layers
