= Gratitude (Dayna Stephens album) =

Album by Dayna Stephens

Studio album by Dayna Stephens
- Released: April 7, 2017
- Length: 53:39
- Label: Contagious Music
- Producer: Matt Pierson

Professional ratings
Review scores
Source	Rating
Down Beat	3.5/5 stars

Gratitude is an album by saxophonist Dayna Stephens.

== Background ==
This was Stephens' second album with the lineup of Brad Mehldau, Julian Lage, Larry Grenadier, and Eric Harland. The first was Peace, from 2014.

== Music and release ==
The album was produced by Matt Pierson. Stephens mostly plays tenor saxophone, but uses baritone for "Isfahan" and EWI for "We Had a Sister".

== Release ==
Gratitude was released by Contagious Music on April 7, 2017.

== Track listing ==
1. "Emilie"
2. "In a Garden"
3. "Amber Is Falling (Red and Yellow)"
4. "Woodside Waltz"
5. "We Had a Sister"
6. "The Timbre of Gratitude"
7. "Isfahan"
8. "Don't Mean a Thing at All"
9. "Clouds"

== Personnel ==
- Dayna Stephens – baritone sax, tenor sax, EWI, synthesizer, bass
- Brad Mehldau – piano (tracks 1, 3, 5), tack piano (track 4)
- Julian Lage – guitar (tracks 2, 4, 6–8)
- Larry Grenadier – bass (tracks 1–8)
- Eric Harland – drums (tracks 1–6, 8, 9)
