= Live in Los Angeles (Julian Lage album) =

Live album by Julian Lage
- Released: November 11, 2016
- Recorded: June 4, 2016
- Venue: Blue Whale, Los Angeles, CA
- Genre: Jazz
- Length: 35:06
- Label: Mack Avenue; MAC 1124 LP
- Producer: Julian Lage

Julian Lage chronology
Arclight (2016)	Live in Los Angeles (2016)	Mount Royal (2017)

Live in Los Angeles is a live album by American jazz guitarist Julian Lage, released by Mack Avenue Records on November 11, 2016. It is a companion to his previous record, Arclight, featuring the same repertoire and trio of himself, bassist Scott Colley, and drummer Kenny Wollesen.

== Reception ==
Professional ratings
Review scores
Source	Rating
Audiophile Audition	4.5/5 stars
DownBeat	4.5/5 stars
UK Vibe	5/5 stars

Audiophile Audition named it "a vibrant glimpse of a then emerging jazz star", noting that "Lage's technical skills are compelling ... he thrives in a live setting."

John Corbett of DownBeat wrote that Lage "tak[es] those pieces for an extended walk, performing in an intimate setting ... in addition to the more songbook-oriented outlook, the guitarist is firmly housed in the creative music continuum."

UK Vibe magazine called the album "simply stunning", while "the five live expanded versions allow the trio to stretch out and develop the tune's themes in far more detail."

== Track listing ==
All tracks are written by Julian Lage except where noted.

No.	Title	Writer(s)	Length
1.	"Persian Rug"	Charles N. Daniels; Gus Kahn	3:20
2.	"I'll Be Seeing You"	Sammy Fain; Irving Kahal	12:57
3.	"Nocturne"	Spike Hughes	4:22
4.	"Stop Go Start"		10:12
5.	"Activate"		4:15
Total length:			35:06

- Recorded live at Blue Whale Jazz Club, Los Angeles, California, on June 4, 2016

== Personnel ==
- Julian Lage – guitar; producer
- Scott Colley – bass
- Kenny Wollesen – drums
- Dan Millice – mastering

== See also ==
- Arclight
