= Arclight (album) =

Studio album by Julian Lage
- Released: March 11, 2016
- Recorded: 2016
- Studio: Brooklyn Recording, New York City
- Genre: Jazz
- Length: 36:45
- Label: Mack Avenue; MAC 1107 LP
- Producer: Jesse Harris

Julian Lage chronology
World's Fair (2015)	Arclight (2016)	Live in Los Angeles (2016)

Arclight is the fourth solo album by American jazz guitarist Julian Lage, released by Mack Avenue Records on March 11, 2016. Two tracks were given a pre-release: "Nocturne" and "Harlem Blues".

== Background ==
Arclight was recorded on a Fender Telecaster, which is not generally considered to be a jazz guitar. Lage stated in an interview that "the electric guitar was always so fascinating to me, and my guitar heroes played it ... Stevie Ray Vaughan ... [Eric] Clapton or whatnot—Muddy Waters."

While most of the tunes on the album are originals, there are several "pre-bebop" compositions from "before things got kind of codified and slick and refined", in Lage's words. Lage said he enjoyed such tunes mostly because of the chord changes, which he described as a "slippery approach to basically fundamental harmony".

"Nocturne", one of the pre-release singles, is a 1930s Spike Hughes composition. Lage explained that he liked this tune because "it starts on this minor chord, and. .. it's very hard to find ... songs that weren't major, that weren't happy, that weren't just total dance music".

According to Lage, the chord progression played on "Harlem Blues", a W. C. Handy composition, was inspired by Willard Robison's chord changes for the song, slightly different from Handy's simpler progression.

== Reception ==
Professional ratings
Review scores
Source	Rating
All About Jazz (Doug Collette)	4.5/5 stars
All About Jazz (Troy Collins)	4/4 stars
AllMusic	4/5 stars
The Irish Times	4/5 stars

Critical reception was generally positive.

Troy Collins of All About Jazz called it a "brisk but bracing affair". Doug Collette of the same publication noted, "Lage proves himself not just a student of his instrument ... but an exceedingly fast learner in the art of studio recording." Collette praised producer Jesse Harris, writing, "Harris deserves extra credit for the size and clarity of the recorded sound here because that introductory track arises from the speaker ... with as much presence as magnitude."

The Irish Times writer Cormac Larkin noted that the album had "echoes of Bill Frisell and particularly Jim Hall", the latter being one of Lage's major influences.

JazzTimes said, "the general mood of the music—call it eclectic Americana with a double shot of whimsy—bring[s] Bill Frisell strongly to mind".

== Track listing ==
All tracks are written by Julian Lage except where noted.

No.	Title	Writer(s)	Length
1.	"Fortune Teller"		3:03
2.	"Persian Rug"	Charles N. Daniels; Gus Kahn	2:23
3.	"Nocturne"	Spike Hughes	3:19
4.	"Supera"		4:01
5.	"Stop Go Start"		3:31
6.	"Activate"		2:08
7.	"Presley"		4:12
8.	"Prospero"		3:08
9.	"I'll Be Seeing You"	Sammy Fain; Irving Kahal	3:31
10.	"Harlem Blues"	W. C. Handy	3:27
11.	"Ryland"		4:02
Total length:			36:45

== Personnel ==
Musicians

- Julian Lage – electric guitar
- Scott Colley – double bass
- Kenny Wollesen – drums, vibraphone

Technical

- Al Pryor – executive vice president
- Gretchen Valade – executive producer
- Jesse Harris, Maria Ehrenreich – producer
- Will Wakefield – production manager
- Ed McEntee, Ted Tuthill – recording engineer
- Nick Nagurka – assistant recording engineer
- Cian Riordan – mixing
- Dan Millice – mastering
- Charlie Wagers – art direction, design
- Justin Camerer – photography
- Willard Robison – music arranger

== Charts ==
Chart (2016)	Peak position
Billboard Jazz Albums	5

== See also ==
- Live in Los Angeles
