= Speak to Me (Julian Lage album) =

Studio album by Julian Lage
- Released: March 1, 2024
- Genre: Jazz
- Length: 59:48
- Label: Blue Note
- Producer: Joe Henry

Julian Lage chronology
The Layers (2023)	Speak to Me (2024)	Scenes from Above (2026)

Speak to Me is a studio album by American jazz guitarist Julian Lage, released on March 1, 2024, through Blue Note Records. It received acclaim from critics.

== Critical reception ==
Professional ratings
Aggregate scores
Source	Rating
Metacritic	91/100
Review scores
Source	Rating
AllMusic	4.5/5 stars
Uncut	8/10

Speak to Me received a score of 91 out of 100 on review aggregator Metacritic based on four critics' reviews, indicating "universal acclaim". Uncut felt that Lage "also plays an agreeably skronky, Jeff Beck-style electric on several tracks, but it's when unplugged that [he] is at his most extraordinary". Timothy Monger of AllMusic wrote that the album "takes a more varied approach with lyrical arrangements that expand and contract depending on the songs' needs. It also features some of the most relaxed and inspired playing of his career."

Doug Collette of Glide Magazine stated that Lage "appears here in a variety of settings, each instance of expansive exploration clarifying the broad overall approach [producer Joe] Henry helped bring to fruition". Spin's Steve Hochman opined that "the pieces are compact, tight, engaging, and, indeed, in many ways song-like. Some are sparklingly electric, some dazzlingly acoustic, some fairly straight [...] But as impressive as his prodigious skills may be, more so is the range of expression and emotion in the playing."

== Track listing ==
All tracks are written by Julian Lage.

No.	Title	Length
1.	"Hymnal"	2:22
2.	"Northern Shuffle"	6:05
3.	"Omission"	3:26
4.	"Serenade"	5:19
5.	"Myself Around You"	5:59
6.	"South Mountain"	5:14
7.	"Speak to Me"	4:15
8.	"Two and One"	4:19
9.	"Vanishing Points"	4:26
10.	"Tiburon"	4:25
11.	"As It Were"	5:07
12.	"76"	4:37
13.	"Nothing Happens Here"	4:14
Total length:		59:48

== Personnel ==
Musicians

- Julian Lage – acoustic guitar (1–3, 5, 6, 8, 9, 11–13), electric guitar (2, 4, 7, 10)
- Jorge Roeder – double bass (1–4, 7–13), vibraphone (1), electric bass (3, 6)
- David King – drums (1–4, 6–12)
- Patrick Warren – keyboards (1, 2, 6–13), piano (3, 4, 11), strings (8), Wurlitzer electric piano (12, 13), zither (12)
- Kris Davis – piano (2, 6, 9, 12, 13)
- Levon Henry – tenor saxophone (2, 7, 12), clarinet (6), alto clarinet (9)

Technical

- Joe Henry – production
- Mark Goodell – engineering, mixing
- Samuel Wahl – engineering assistance
- Jeff Powell, Kim Rosen – mastering
- Julian Lage, Jorge Roeder – arrangements

== Charts ==
Chart performance for Speak to Me
Chart (2024)	Peak position
Croatian International Albums (HDU)	21
