= Irish Goodbye =

Irish Goodbye may refer to:

- The act of departing from a location or event without notifying others, also known as a French leave
- "Irish Goodbye", a song on American musician Maria Taylor's 2007 album Lynn Teeter Flower
- Irish Goodbye, a 2011 album by American musician Mac Lethal
- "Irish Goodbye", a song on American country rock band Reckless Kelly's 2013 album Long Night Moon
- Irish Goodbye, a 2013 stand-up comedy special by American comedian Morgan Murphy
- "Irish Goodbye", a song on American musician Margaret Glaspy's 2023 album Echo the Diamond
- "Irish Goodbye", a song on American musician K.Flay's 2023 album Mono
- "Irish Goodbye", a song on American musician Kacey Musgraves's 2024 album Deeper Well
- "Irish Goodbye", a song on American musician Lil Tecca's 2025 album Dopamine
- "Irish Goodbye", a song on Irish trio Kneecap's 2026 album Fenian

== See also ==
- An Irish Goodbye, a 2022 short film
- "An Irish Goodbye", an episode of animated sitcom American Dad!
