= Close to Picture =

EP by Julian Lage and Chris Eldridge
- Released: August 6, 2013
- Recorded: April 2013
- Genre: Folk; bluegrass
- Length: 20:16
- Label: Not on label (self-released)

Julian Lage chronology
Gladwell (2011)	Close to Picture (2013)	Free Flying (2013)

Chris Eldridge chronology
Ahoy! (2012)	Close to Picture (2014)	Avalon (2014)

Close to Picture is a studio EP by American guitarists Julian Lage and Chris Eldridge, self-released by the two on August 6, 2013.

Eldridge explained about the release, "The whole point was to explore sounds and textures that are uniquely possible on a flat-top steel-string guitar. ... Traditionally, these old Martin guitars, which are some of the most incredible instruments in the world, have been used for accompanying folk, bluegrass and country songs. There hasn't been a lot of exploration of what they're uniquely capable of, their particular rich tonal palate, what they have to offer to the world that other instruments don't". Lage added that it "was kind of a grand experiment".

== Reception ==
The Lexington Herald-Leader wrote that the record had a "congenial feel ... highlighting the guitarists' stylistic differences and the obvious dialogue that grew out of the resulting music".

Regarding the release, (Le) Poisson Rouge stated, "They were venturing into uncharted territory, beyond genre, reaching for a language of their own through the on-the-spot interplay of their guitars."

Indy Week called it "masterful".

== Track listing ==
No.	Title	Writer(s)	Length
1.	"At the Meeting House"	Julian Lage; Chris Eldridge	4:47
2.	"Cattle in the Cane"	Traditional	3:51
3.	"Boca Grande"	Eldridge	3:38
4.	"For Critter"	Lage	4:16
Total length:			16:32

Additional track
No.	Title	Writer(s)	Length
1.	"Cattle in the Cane (alternate take)"	Traditional	3:44
Total length:			20:16

- Recorded in the home living room of Rob Griffin in April 2013

== Personnel ==
- Julian Lage – acoustic guitar (1939 Martin 000-18)
- Chris Eldridge – acoustic guitar (1939 Martin D-28)
- Rob Griffin – recording engineer
- Alejandro Venguer – mixing
- Oscar Zambrano – mastering
