= Love Hurts (Julian Lage album) =

Studio album by Julian Lage
- Released: February 22, 2019
- Recorded: September 22–23, 2018
- Studio: The Loft, Chicago, Illinois
- Genre: Jazz
- Length: 44:06
- Label: Mack Avenue
- Producer: Julian Lage

Julian Lage chronology
Modern Lore (2018)	Love Hurts (2019)	Squint (2021)

Love Hurts is an album by guitarist Julian Lage that was released in February 2019 by the Mack Avenue label.

== Production ==
Love Hurts was Lage's debut album as a producer, and his first using the trio of Dave King on drums and Jorge Roeder on bass. All but two of the tracks on the album are covers, with Lage telling Guitar World "the whole idea was to do songs I love". Lage also said the songs were chosen because they all packed an "emotion punch", as well as being shorter-form, and written by American songwriters over the past 50–60 years (with the exception of one early-1930s popular song).

The album was recorded at The Loft, the rehearsal and recording facility of the American band Wilco. Each song was recorded live in the studio in one or two takes, with Lage aiming to "capture the early stages". Rather than using his 1954 telecaster, Lage recorded the album with a 1956 Gretsch Duo Jet owned by Wilco front man Jeff Tweedy, through a Gibson BR-6 amplifier.

== Reception ==
Professional ratings
Review scores
Source	Rating
Allmusic	4/5 stars
All About Jazz	4/5 stars

The Allmusic review by Thom Jurek stated "Of all the records in Lage's catalog, Love Hurts sounds like it was the most fun to make; in turn, it is a complete delight for listeners".

On All About Jazz, Chris Mosey said "Julian Lage is a tremendously talented acoustic guitarist and by all accounts a polite, mild mannered kind of guy. Though this might not be the whole story. The cover picture of his album is of twenty used matches, which is thought to refer to his worries of becoming burnt-out after being hailed as a child prodigy then burdened with the lofty expectations of his admirers ... what he does best is to revisit and transform melancholy old pop numbers. His arrangement of the title track, an Everly Brothers' hit from 1965, is quite stunning and his playing of it makes you forget the number's lachrymose country origins".

Referring to the way the album included covers of both pop and jazz songs, Suzanne Lorge wrote in DownBeat “On the surface, these [songs] all might not have much to communicate to each other. But Lage’s incisive musicality and clean fretwork go a long way to bridging aesthetic divides. His two originals (“In Circles" and “Lullaby") are the most inclusive selections on the recording, borrowing from nearly everything else and signaling the guitarist’s compositional intent: to build musical bridges firmly rooted in place, but standing outside of time and genre."

Bruce Lindsay, in his review on Jazz Journal, said of the track list, “Lage is equally at home with jazz and country/Americana numbers – and with the more unusual…All three players are subtle and restrained, playing with a lightness of touch that suits the downbeat mood of the song."

In a long form interview with Lage for JazzTimes, James Rotondi wrote of the album “Eclectic though it may be, the material on Love Hurts reflects Lage’s interest in finding single vehicles through which to express a total vision."

== Track listing ==
1. "In Heaven" (Peter Ivers, David Lynch) – 4:34
2. "Tomorrow Is the Question" (Ornette Coleman) – 3:36
3. "The Windup" (Keith Jarrett) – 4:03
4. "Love Hurts" (Boudleaux Bryant) – 4:45
5. "In Circles" (Julian Lage) – 4:30
6. "Encore (A)" (Keith Jarrett) – 4:44
7. "Lullaby" (Lage) – 3:45
8. "Trudgin'" (Jimmy Giuffre) – 3:57
9. "I'm Getting Sentimental Over You" (George Bassman, Ned Washington) – 4:06
10. "Crying" (Roy Orbison, Joe Melson) – 5:34

== Personnel ==
- Julian Lage – guitar
- Jorge Roeder – bass
- David King – drums
