= World's Fair (disambiguation) =

A world's fair is a large public exhibition.

World's Fair may also refer to:

== Related to the 1939 New York World's Fair ==
- World's Fair Lo-V (New York City Subway car), built in 1938
- IND World's Fair Line, a New York City subway line serving the 1939 World's Fair
- World's Fair Marina, a public marina in Flushing Bay, Queens, New York

== Events ==
- Rockton World's Fair, an annual Thanksgiving weekend tradition in Flamborough, Ontario, Canada
- Tunbridge World's Fair, an annual event held in mid-September in Tunbridge, Vermont, US

== Places and structures ==
- Trump World's Fair, a defunct hotel and casino in Atlantic City, New Jersey, US
- World's Fair Park, a public park in Knoxville, Tennessee, US

== Arts and entertainment ==
- World's Fair (album), a 2015 album by Julian Lage
- World's Fair (novel), a 1985 novel by E.L. Doctorow
- "World's Fair" (Law & Order: Criminal Intent), a television episode
- World's Fair, a New York hip hop collective featuring Remy Banks

== See also ==
- List of world's fairs
