= Gladwell (album) =

Studio album by Julian Lage
- Released: April 26, 2011
- Recorded: August 12–14, September 29, and December 10 & 11, 2010
- Studio: WBGH, Boston, Massachusetts
- Genre: Jazz
- Length: 50:39
- Label: EmArcy; 2765660
- Producer: Steven Epstein; Julian Lage

Julian Lage chronology
Sounding Point (2009)	Gladwell (2011)	Close to Picture (2013)

Gladwell is an album by guitarist Julian Lage, released by EmArcy Records in 2011.

== Reception ==
Professional ratings
Review scores
Source	Rating
AllMusic	4/5 stars
The Guardian	3/5 stars

The AllMusic review by Alex Henderson stated, "Lage, who is heard on both acoustic and electric guitar, is appealingly melodic on his own compositions ... Lage is not a jazz purist; this is jazz mixed with elements of rock, folk, and European classical music. Gladwell is fusion (there is no shame attached to that word), but it isn't the aggressive and heavily amplified fusion ... Actually, the playing on this album is largely, though not exclusively, acoustic. ... And while Lage clearly has chops, he doesn't beat listeners over the head with them, or his technique. Lage is very much a storyteller, and that storyteller perspective yields excellent results on Gladwell".

For The Guardian, John Fordham wrote, "Gladwell is an invigorating demonstration of how vivid a sound-world can be established by a quintet of acoustic players. It moves from fast-strummed groovers over which the cello and sax swirl, then turns into busy city nightscapes full of whispering voices, through romantic cafe-music pirouettings (which become demandingly percussive) and finally to delicate, jig-like melodies ... this is an album of quiet character for every kind of listener".

In JazzTimes, Bill Beuttler wrote, "These days, though, musicians are casting wider nets in their search for new combinations of sounds. A case in point is Gladwell, the brilliant young guitarist Julian Lage's even better follow-up to his Grammy-nominated debut album of two years ago, Sounding Point. The prodigy is all grown up now at 23, more dazzling than ever on guitar, and fronting a tight, unorthodoxly instrumented ensemble ... The uptempo set-closer 'Telegram' is the flashiest tune on the disc, but Lage throughout is more interested in making music than flaunting technique. That's especially evident in the five of the CD's 12 tunes he performs solo. Three of those five are multitracked efforts on which Lage accompanies himself in evoking specific moods. But the best are two utterly charming solo-guitar covers".

== Track listing ==
All tracks are written by Julian Lage except where noted.

No.	Title	Writer(s)	Length
1.	"233 Butler"		5:34
2.	"Margaret"		6:50
3.	"Point the Way"		2:12
4.	"However"	Dan Blake	6:28
5.	"Freight Train"	Elizabeth Cotten	2:10
6.	"Cathedral"		2:10
7.	"Listening Walk"		4:29
8.	"Cocoon"		2:21
9.	"Autumn Leaves"	Joseph Kosma; Jacques Prévert; Johnny Mercer	3:16
10.	"Iowa Taken"		9:07
11.	"Listen Darkly"		1:09
12.	"Telegram"		4:53
Total length:			50:39

== Personnel ==
Musicians

- Julian Lage – acoustic and electric guitars
- Dan Blake – tenor saxophone, melodica; (1, 2, 4, 7, 8, 11)
- Aristides Rivas – cello (1, 2, 4, 7, 8, 11)
- Jorge Roeder – acoustic bass (tracks 1, 2, 4, 7, 8, 10 & 11)
- Tupac Mantilla – drums, percussion; (1, 2, 4, 7, 8, 10, 11)

Production

- Steven Epstein, Julian Lage – producer
- Antonio Oliart – recording engineer
- Richard King – recording engineer, mixing
- Frank Cunningham, Hyomin Kang – assistant recording engineer
- Matt Read – art direction
- Ingrid Hertfelder – photography
