= Modern Lore =

Studio album by Julian Lage
- Released: February 2, 2018
- Studios: Reservoir Studios, New York City; The Loft, Chicago (mixing); Engine Room Audio, NYC (mastering)
- Genre: Jazz
- Length: 42:37
- Labels: Mack Avenue; MAC 1131 LP
- Producers: Jesse Harris; Maria Ehrenreich

Julian Lage chronology
Mount Royal (2017)	Modern Lore (2018)	Love Hurts (2019)

Modern Lore is the fifth studio album by American jazz guitarist Julian Lage, which was released on February 2, 2018, by Mack Avenue Records.

== Reception ==
Professional ratings
Aggregate scores
Source	Rating
Metacritic	81/100
Review scores
Source	Rating
AllMusic	4/5 stars
All About Jazz (Doug Collette)	4/5 stars
All About Jazz (Gareth Thompson)	4.5/5 stars
Paste	8.1/10
Tom Hull	B

Response to the record was positive, with Metacritic assigning the album an aggregate score of 81 out of 100 based on 4 critical reviews, indicating "universal acclaim".

The AllMusic review by Thom Jurek stated, "It's simply instrumental, Americana-tinged rock with a smattering of jazz improvisation and other exotic touches woven in ... This is Lage and his trio playing for themselves and obviously enjoying it; they create an easy intimacy and offer a warm welcome for listeners. The music here is not only solid, but attractive and clever to boot."

On All About Jazz, Gareth Thompson's review enthused, "Modern Lore seeks out the very foundations of rock music and digs deep ... Tagging this collection as some kind of 'jazz-rock' outing would be simplistic and gruff. For sure it moves Lage into new arenas, but when did he ever remain static? Modern Lore is a perfect paean to the electric guitar and all its sensual traditions." On the same site, Doug Collette said, "Modern Lore constitutes a measure of guitarist Julian Lage's grasp of the pragmatic values of a working musician ... The uniformity within this record is comparable to the last in terms of both conception and execution. Yet Modern Lore isn't merely more of the same as the last record ... Although he's never merely workmanlike in his playing or writing (he composed all the material on the album), Julian Lage is too understated a musician/composer to literally grab attention. Rather, he entices a listener with the warm incisive fingerwork ... this music, as with the entire body of work by the guitarist to whom it's credited, holds the potential for consistently rewarding listening over an unusually extended period of time."

Paste reviewer Robert Ham observed that "the result is a snappy, multi-colored affair that gives him ample room to show off his unmatched skills with his chosen instrument. For much of the album, Lage looks for ways to expand upon the mode of the country picker ... Elsewhere on the album, he and his band write songs that feel like adult contemporary pop hits just waiting for a vocalist to help take them to the charts ... Modern Lore even drops a little experimental number in the mix. But just a little ...but it's also what helps turn Modern Lore from a good album into something closer to great. The comfort that Lage and his bandmates evince needs those small shakeups to keep from devolving into something pleasant but unengaging. The trio toes that line at times on this new release without completely falling into pure background fodder. It's a delicate balance that only the best players could attain. Time will tell if they can maintain it."

NPR's Nate Chinen noted, "this one feels loose and unburdened. It's the strongest album of Lage's career so far, and the first that fully captures his trademark melding of fleet precision, open-road possibility and radiant self-assurance. If that sounds like a distinctly American set of qualities, so be it: Lage is a distinctly American sort of artist. His musical persona draws from the expansive jazz continuum (ragtime to bebop and beyond) as well as rustic folk music and the blues. And because this trio features him on a Fender Telecaster, the countrified side of his playing often shines through."

In JazzTimes, Natalie Weiner wrote, "Lage's 11 original compositions abstract some of the most iconic sounds in American music, with hints of rock, country and folk all coming through in his warm, intimate tone ... That is not to say the cozy result lacks urgency. Lage's virtuosity manifests in precise, clear improvisation that doesn't require technical fireworks, spotlighting instead his remarkable gift for melody. In the few moments when his experimental side comes through, though, it's clear how important dissonance and dynamics are to tempering the album's generally gentle, whimsical sound".

Digital Trends included Modern Lore in its ranked list of the best 50 albums of 2018, placing it at #18.

== Track listing ==
All tracks are written and arranged by Julian Lage.

No.	Title	Length
1.	"The Ramble"	3:56
2.	"Atlantic Limited"	3:51
3.	"General Thunder"	5:25
4.	"Roger the Dodger"	4:12
5.	"Wordsmith"	4:01
6.	"Splendor Riot"	3:56
7.	"Revelry"	3:31
8.	"Look Book"	3:01
9.	"Whatever You Say, Henry"	4:11
10.	"Earth Science"	2:15
11.	"Pantheon"	4:18
Total length:		42:37

== Personnel ==
Musicians

- Julian Lage – guitar
- Jesse Harris – acoustic guitar (2, 3, 5–7, 11), maracas, casio synthesizer
- Tyler Chester – keyboards
- Scott Colley – bass
- Kenny Wollesen – drums, vibraphone

Technical

- Gretchen Valade – executive producer
- Jesse Harris – producer
- Maria Ehrenreich – producer, creative art
- James Yost – recording engineer
- Daniel Avila – assistant recording engineer
- Dan Millice – mastering
- Tom Schick – mixing
- Aaron Sawyer, Hannah Boren – management
- Shannon Moore, Will Wakefield – product manager
- Al Pryor – A&R
- Raj Naik – art direction, design
- Francesca Faber – cover illustration
- Nathan West – photography
