= Scenes from Above =

Studio album by Julian Lage
- Released: January 23, 2026
- Studios: Sear Sound, New York City
- Genre: Jazz
- Length: 42:12
- Labels: Blue Note; 216522 LP / 228648 CD
- Producer: Joe Henry

Julian Lage chronology
Speak to Me (2024)	Scenes from Above (2026)

Scenes from Above is a studio album by guitarist Julian Lage, released by Blue Note Records on January 23, 2026. It features Lage in a new quartet with keyboardist John Medeski, bassist Jorge Roeder, and drummer Kenny Wollesen, additionally with Patrick Warren covering various keyboards and percussion.

Lage's inspiration for the album came from guessing how the quartet would interact; "My dream with composing, really, is to have something to talk about once we're together," he said. Lage initially wrote the songs in short sprints of each around 20 minutes.

== Reception ==
Professional ratings
Review scores
Source	Rating
AllMusic	3.5/5 stars
The Arts Desk	5/5 stars
PopMatters	7/10

Thom Jurek of AllMusic wrote that the album "lacks the tension of its predecessor, but that equally collaborative dynamic is the point", with "gauzy strength, pliability, and openness of the ensemble in trusting and embracing the tender quality of Lage's music".

Sebastian Scotney, writing for The Arts Desk, commented, "Scenes From Above hopefully shows him [Lage] entering a new phase. It is a very classy album indeed." Scotney attributes this to the fact that "it reunites the jazz guitarist with the drummer on the earlier album, the magnificently empathetic Kenny Wolleson."

Glide magazine wrote, "the participants make the most of the unusual combination of their overall experience as musicians it meshes with the novelty of their unity on this record ... Julian Lage simultaneously consolidates and extends his artistic courage with Scenes From Above".

PopMatters's Will Layman stated, "John Medeski colors each Julian Lage composition to perfection. For all its ease of listening, this album isn't comfort food as much as a really balanced meal."

== Track listing ==
All tracks are written by Julian Lage.

No.	Title	Length
1.	"Opal"	4:09
2.	"Red Elm"	4:46
3.	"Talking Drum"	5:06
4.	"Havens"	4:43
5.	"Night Shade"	7:23
6.	"Solid Air"	3:20
7.	"Ocala"	4:20
8.	"Storyville"	4:23
9.	"Something More"	4:02
Total length:		42:12

== Personnel ==
Musicians

- Julian Lage – acoustic and electric guitars
- John Medeski – piano, Hammond B3 organ
- Jorge Roeder – double bass
- Kenny Wollesen – drums, percussion
- Patrick Warren – piano, Chamberlin, dulcitone, strings, bells, percussion

Technical

- Joe Henry – producer
- Mark Goodell – recording engineer, mixing
- Kim Rosen – mastering
- Nick Steinhardt – art direction, design

== Charts ==
=== Weekly charts ===
Weekly chart performance for Scenes from Above
Chart (2026)	Peak position
UK Album Downloads (Official Charts)	56
UK Jazz & Blues Albums (Official Charts)	14
US Top Current Album Sales (Billboard)	47
US Top Jazz Albums (Billboard)	13

=== Monthly charts ===
Monthly chart performance for Scenes from Above
Chart (2026)	Peak position
German Jazz Albums (Offizielle Top 100)	9
