= Tupac Mantilla =

Colombian musician

Túpac Mantilla
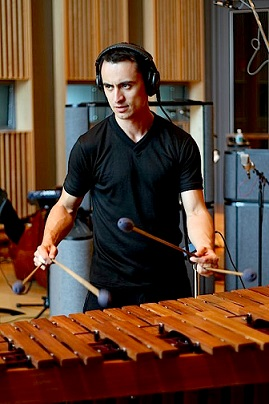
- JLG Recording Session – 2010

Background information
- Birth name: Túpac Mantilla Gómez
- Born: October 21, 1978 (age 46); Bogotá, Colombia
- Genres: Jazz, classical, world
- Occupation(s): Musician, educator
- Instrument(s): Drums, percussion
- Years active: 1997–present
- Labels: Percuaction
- Website: tupacmantilla.com

Tupac Mantilla (born October 21, 1978) is a percussionist from Bogotá, Colombia. He is the founder and director of the Global Percussion Network PERCUACTION and the director of the percussion group Tekeyé. He has worked with Bobby McFerrin, Esperanza Spalding, Zakir Hussain, Bill Cosby, Danilo Perez, Julian Lage, Bob Moses, and Medeski, Martin and Wood.

As a scholar, Mantilla is associated with institutions such as Stanford University through the Stanford Jazz Workshop, and the Berklee College of Music through the Berklee Global Jazz Institute (BGJI), and gives workshops and lectures and runs rhythm/percussion oriented programs worldwide, through PERCUACTION's Global Rhythm Institute (GRI).

== Career ==
Mantilla has appeared at festivals, institutions and venues including Carnegie Hall, Lincoln Center, Stanford University, The New England Conservatory, Kennedy Center, Berklee College of Music, London's Barbican, Tanglewood, The Montreal, North Sea, Perugia, Montreux, Gent, Nice, Newport Jazz Festivals among many others; as well as several percussion-oriented workshops and lectures for prestigious multi-national companies and organizations around the world.

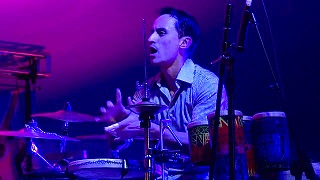
Performing with the Julian Lage Trio

He has a Master of Music Honors Degree from the New England Conservatory and was the first prize recipient of the 2002 Bogotá's Philharmonic Orchestra's Classical Soloist Competition, Mantilla has collaborated and performed with artists including Bobby McFerrin, Bill Cosby, Zakir Hussain, Savion Glover, Danilo Perez, Reinhard Flatischler, Kenny Werner, John Patitucci, Tisziji Muñoz, Bob Moses, Steve Smith, John Medeski, Michael Cain, Cecil McBee, Jamey Haddad, Anders Koppel, Deepak Ram, Medeski Martin & Wood, Lisa Fischer, Selene Muñoz, Ulita Knaus, Opus 4, Sofia Rei, Edmar Castañeda, Juanito Pascual, Tia Fuller, Julian Lage and the Bogotá's Philharmonic Orchestra's.

Mantilla is the founder, CEO and artistic director of the Global Percussion Network PERCUACTION, with which he leads several educational and social projects and initiatives worldwide. He is the artistic director of Colombia's experimental Percussion Group TEKEYÉ and devotes much of his time to work on his SOLO PERCUSSION project.

== Discography ==
=== As sideman ===
- Anders Koppel, Past Present Future (Cowbell Music 2017)
- Rolf Kühn, Yellow + Blue (MPS, 2018)
- Brian Landrus, Forward (Cadence, 2009)
- Julian Lage, Gladwell (EmArcy, 2011)
- Julian Lage, Sounding Point (EmArcy, 2009)
