= Juanito Pascual =

Guitarist and composer

Jonathan "Juanito" Pascual (born July 26, 1973) is an American-born flamenco guitarist and composer.

In 2011 Pascual formed the Juanito Pascual New Flamenco Trio with percussionist Tupac Mantilla, and bassist Brad Barrett (Haggai Cohen Milo, in the first iteration). The Trio's self-titled release came out in Feb. 2014, creating a sound that merges flamenco with elements of jazz, rock and world-music influences.

He has collaborated with numerous environmental projects, and has an ongoing relationship with Earth Train and their Junglewood project in the Panamanian rain forest. In fall of 2013 he was invited to perform at Panama's Biodiversity Museum in association with National Geographic to celebrate Earth Train's collaboration with Jane Goodall.

A graduate with honors from Boston's New England Conservatory of Music from their Contemporary Improvisation program in 1997.

== Discography ==
- Cosas en Comun (2003)
- Language of the Heart (2009)
- Juanito Pascual New Flamenco Trio (2014)

== Publications ==
- The Total Flamenco Guitarist (2011 - Alfred Publishing)
