= Echo the Diamond =

Studio album by Margaret Glaspy
- Released: August 18, 2023
- Length: 35:45
- Label: ATO
- Producer: Margaret Glaspy; Julian Lage

Margaret Glaspy chronology
Devotion (2020)	Echo the Diamond (2023)

Singles from Echo the Diamond
- 1. "Act Natural" Released: May 31, 2023; 2. "Memories" Released: July 11, 2023; 3. "Get Back" Released: August 15, 2023

Echo the Diamond is the third studio album by American musician Margaret Glaspy. It was released on August 18, 2023, through ATO.

== Background and singles ==
The title Echo the Diamond was inspired by a conversation she had with her partner Julian Lage about Bruce Lee. To Glaspy, it signifies "shine bright" and "be brilliant". The album was produced by Glaspy herself with co-production from Lage, featured as guitarist and composer. About the record, Glaspy revealed that it stems from the attempt of meeting "life on life's terms, instead of looking for a happy ending in everything", describing the creation process as "effortless catharsis".

Glaspy announced the album on May 31, 2023, and shared the lead single "Act Natural", a "roaring, wondrous stroke of blues-injected rock 'n' roll". Another preview of the album was given on July 11, with the release of the single "Memories". To her, the song constitutes the "most challenging song for me to track" as the take presented on the album is the only time Glaspy could "get through" the track completely, reaching a "level of vulnerability" she had never seen before on a record. A third single titled "Get Back" was released on August 15, a song that helped her out of a "dark time".

The album will be supported by a 33-date tour through North America and the United Kingdom starting on August 18.

== Critical reception ==
Professional ratings
Aggregate scores
Source	Rating
Metacritic	84/100
Review scores
Source	Rating
American Songwriter	4/5 stars
The Irish Times	4/5 stars
Line of Best Fit	8/10
Pitchfork	7.7/10

Echo the Diamond was met with widespread acclaim and rave reviews by critics. At Metacritic, which assigns a normalized rating out of 100 to reviews from mainstream publications, Echo the Diamond received an average score of 84, based on four reviews, indicating "universal acclaim".

== Track listing ==
All tracks are written by Margaret Glaspy.

Echo the Diamond track listing
No.	Title	Length
1.	"Act Natural"	4:19
2.	"Get Back"	3:46
3.	"Female Brain"	2:26
4.	"Irish Goodbye"	3:45
5.	"I Didn't Think So"	3:58
6.	"Memories"	4:13
7.	"Turn the Engine"	3:22
8.	"Hammer and the Nail"	3:12
9.	"My Eyes"	3:29
10.	"People Who Talk"	3:15
Total length:		35:45
