= Dayna Stephens =

American jazz saxophonist and composer (born 1978)

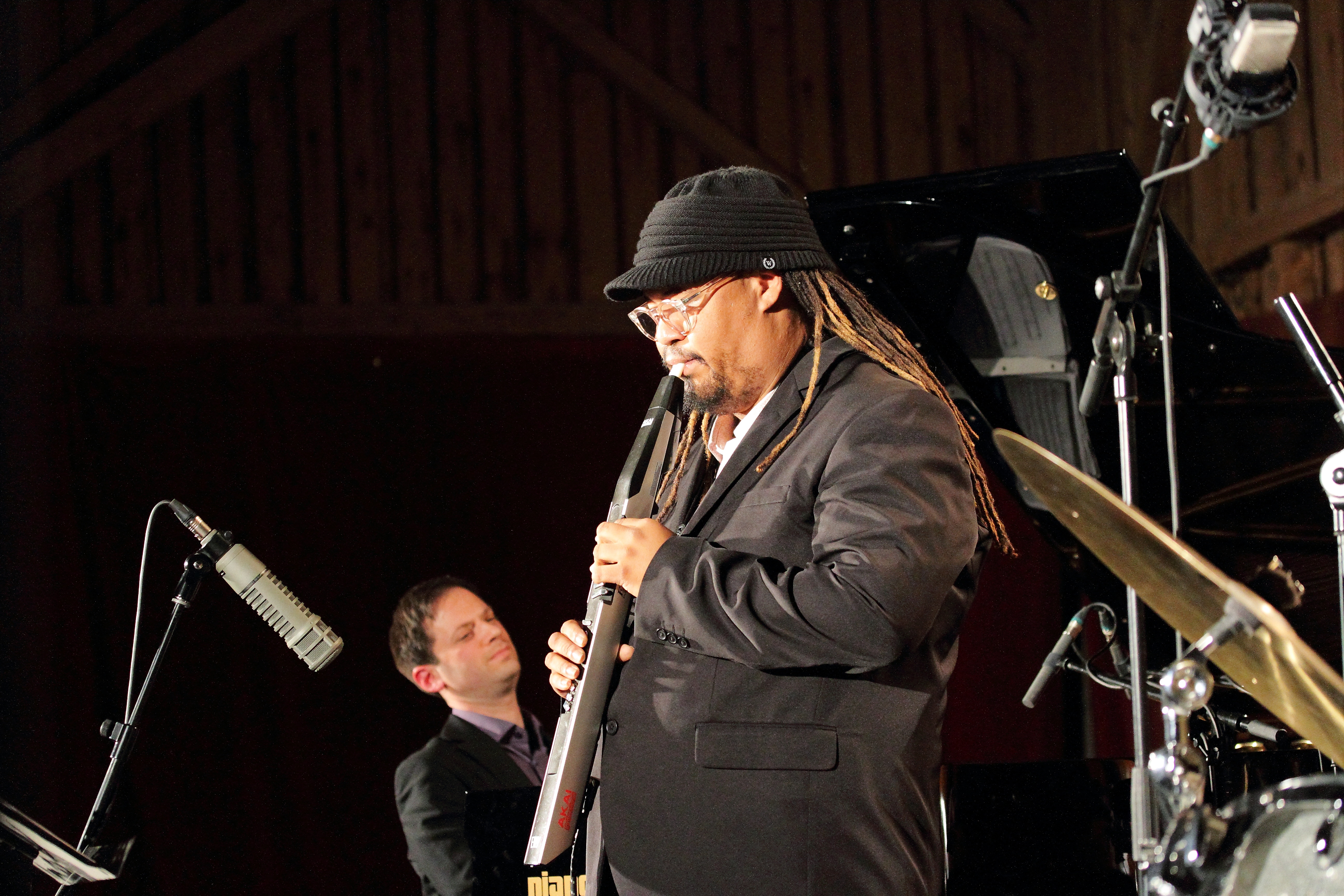
- INNtöne Jazzfestival, Austria 2016

Background information
- Born: August 1, 1978 (age 48); Brooklyn, New York
- Genre: Jazz
- Occupation: Musician
- Instruments: Saxophone, EWI
- Years active: 2000s–present
- Website: daynastephenssound.com

Dayna Stephens (born August 1, 1978) is an American jazz saxophonist and composer. In addition to leading his own group, Stephens has performed extensively with Kenny Barron, Ambrose Akinmusire, Taylor Eigsti, Julian Lage, Eric Harland, and Gerald Clayton. Stephens grew up in the San Francisco Bay Area and attended Berkeley High School. He went on to study at the Berklee School of Music and later at the Thelonious Monk Institute of Jazz.

Stephens's albums include The Timeless Now (2007), Today Is Tomorrow (2012), That Nepenthetic Place (2013), I'll Take My Chances (2013), and Peace (2014). Peace features guitarist Julian Lage, pianist Brad Mehldau, bassist Larry Grenadier, and drummer Eric Harland. Gratitude was released in 2017.

== Discography ==
=== As leader ===
- The Timeless Now (CTA, 2007)
- A Week Ago Today (Prophone, 2011)
- Today Is Tomorrow (Criss Cross, 2012)
- I'll Take My Chances (Criss Cross, 2013)
- That Nepenthetic Place (Sunnyside, 2013)
- Peace (Sunnyside, 2014)
- New Day (Vegamusic, 2014)
- Reminiscent (Criss Cross, 2015)
- Gratitude (Contagious Music, 2017)
- Right Now! (Contagious Music, 2020)
- Liberty (Contagious Music, 2020)
- Closer Than We Think (Cellar Live under / La Reserve Records, LLCC, 2024)
- Hopium (Contagious Music, 2025)
- Monk'd (Contagious Music, 2025)

=== As sideman ===
- Faye Carol, A Soulful Christmas (Getdown, 2026)
- Kenny Barron, Concentric Circles (Blue Note, 2018)
- David Berkman, Old Friends and New Friends (Palmetto, 2015)
- David Berkman, Six of One (Palmetto, 2019)
- Massimo Biolcati, Incontre (Sounderscore, 2020)
- Gerald Clayton, Life Forum (Concord Jazz, 2013)
- Gerald Clayton, Tributary Tales (Motema, 2017)
- Joe Cohn, Marathon Man (Vegamusic, 2014)
- Dan Cray, Outside In (Origin, 2016)
- Jeff Denson, "Outside My Window" (Ridgeway Records, 2019)
- Al Foster, Inspirations & Dedications (Smoke Sessions, 2019)
- Danny Grissett, Remembrance (Savant, 2017)
- Allison Miller, Science Fair (Sunnyside, 2018)
- Linda Oh, Initial Here (Greenleaf Music, 2012)
- Gretchen Parlato, The Lost and Found (Obliqsound, 2011)
- Phil Ranelin, Inspiration (Wide Hive 2004)
- Matt Slocum, Black Elk's Dream (Chandra, 2014)
- Paul Zarzyski, Collisions of Reckless Love (Open Path Music 2006)
