= Mount Royal (album) =

Studio album by Julian Lage and Chris Eldridge
- Released: February 24, 2017
- Studio: EMP Studios, Valley Village, California
- Genre: Bluegrass, Jazz, folk
- Length: 41:36
- Label: Free Dirt
- Producer: Gabe Witcher

Julian Lage chronology
Live in Los Angeles (2016)	Mount Royal (2017)	Modern Lore (2018)

Chris Eldridge chronology
The Phosphorescent Blues (2011)	Mount Royal (2017)	All Ashore (2018)

Mount Royal is an album by guitarists Julian Lage and Chris Eldridge which was released by the Free Dirt label in 2017. The record was nominated for a Grammy in the "Best Contemporary Instrumental Album" category.

== Reception ==
Professional ratings
Review scores
Source	Rating
The Absolute Sound	3.5/5 stars

The Absolute Sound review by Greg Cahill said "Mount Royal finds the two guitarists exploring atmospheric acoustic tunes, soft-jazzy instrumentals, and the occasional lyrical ballad. There is also a pair of straight-ahead bluegrass instrumentals on which the guitarists weave crosspicked lines to create lacy melodies. “Goldacre” is a better example of how these talented pickers can blend seemingly divergent styles, with Lage adding his moody minor-chord accents to Eldridge’s traditional bluegrass runs. I had hoped for more of that latter approach, in which the duo unites to create a distinctive, blended sound, rather than alternating between their very different styles".

On Jazz Weekly, George W. Harris stated "Jazz and bluegrass meet on successful terms ... In a setting like this, the only difference between genres is a few flatted notes here and there, as the easy blues and swing define both artists and guitars".

In The New Yorker Alec Wilkinson wrote "Eldridge’s playing is resourceful and fleet. He prefers the lower intervals of the chords and Lage, at times, likes the higher ones, and they both like a measure of scruffy dissonance. Eldridge has always been an adventurous player, and Lage is unrestrained ... I like everything on the record, but Eldridge’s piercing singing is best, I think, on “Things in Life” and “Sleeping By Myself.” Everything else is simply two acoustic guitars, and, even in our present moment of great richness in music of all kinds, it has the virtue of sounding like nothing else.".

== Track listing ==
All compositions by Chris Eldridge and Julian Lage except where noted.

1. "Bone Collector" – 4:47
2. "Rygar" (Chris Eldridge) – 3:24
3. "Everything Must Go" – 4:53
4. "Things in Life" (Don Stover) – 3:21
5. "Old Grimes" – 2:51
6. "Henry" (Julian Lage) – 3:49
7. "Sleeping By Myself" (Eddie Vedder) – 2:42
8. "Broadcast" (Lage) – 3:27
9. "Goldacre" (Lage) – 3:25
10. "Lion's Share" – 3:32
11. "Living in the Mississippi Valley" (John Hartford) – 2:31
12. "Greener Grass" (Eldridge) – 3:02

== Personnel ==
- Julian Lage – guitar
- Chris Eldridge – guitar, vocals
