= World's Fair (album) =

Studio album by Julian Lage
- Released: March 2, 2015
- Recorded: March 19, June 16–17, 2014
- Studio: Echo Mountain, Asheville, North Carolina (tracks 5 & 8); Sear Sound, New York City (all other tracks)
- Genre: Jazz, folk
- Length: 37:56
- Label: Modern Lore
- Producer: Matt Munisteri

Julian Lage chronology
| Room (2014) | World's Fair (2015) | Arclight (2016) |

World's Fair is the third album released by Julian Lage as leader. Recorded on a 1939 Martin 000-18 with no overdubbing, it is the first solo album he has recorded.

== Background ==
Lage said that a large part of the inspiration for this album was the classical guitarist Andrés Segovia, and that it "draw[s] from the sonic fingerprint of early radio recordings mixed with the short form structures of some of my favorite classical and folk music". While he still considers the album to be jazz-oriented, he stated that he stayed away from swing-style music "because I didn't think solo guitar was the format for me to play swing".

== Overview ==
The first track, "40's", which was the only song given a pre-release, is of a medium tempo and alternates between the keys of F and D. "Peru" opens with some light picking before settling into the actual tune, and "Japan" begins "with an angular, almost discordant sound, but enters into a laid back groove, occasionally interrupted by unsettled harmonies".

"Double Stops", as the title implies, makes extensive use of double stops throughout the course of the song. "Gardens" was described as making Lage sound like "a flatpicking Andrés Segovia", due to the fast bluegrass picking technique employed.

Only two tracks on the album were not composed by Lage. The first, "Where or When", a Rodgers and Hart show tune, was described as "[lingering] like a comfortable memory." The other is a folk song, "Red Prairie Dawn", which "puts his folk roots on display."

== Reception ==
Professional ratings
Review scores
| Source | Rating |
|---|---|
| AllAboutJazz | 4.5/5 stars |
| Sun Gazette | 4/4 stars |

Mark F. Turner's AllAboutJazz review said that "It's the perfect showcase of his fine abilities on acoustic guitar." Relix's review said that "the music's austerity magnifies its grandeur".

The review from The Stanford Daily stated that "Fans of Lage's more experimental work...may be disappointed to find that World's Fair lacks the abstract sophistication found in many works of contemporary jazz. But it's fairly clear that Lage was not writing to push musical boundaries, but rather to pay homage to the diverse range of music that has shaped his own playing and taste." The Sun Gazette commented "Lage [serves] the songs rather than his ego...the brilliance is in how simple and effortless he makes it sound".

== Track listing ==
All compositions written by Julian Lage except where noted.

1. 40's – 3:50
2. Peru – 2:54
3. Japan – 4:11
4. Ryland – 3:16
5. Double Stops – 1:50
6. Gardens – 3:56
7. Century – 2:55
8. Where or When (Richard Rodgers) – 2:21
9. Missouri – 4:11
10. Red Prairie Dawn (Gary Harrison/Traditional) – 2:51
11. Day and Age – 2:41
12. Lullaby – 3:00

== Personnel ==
- Julian Lage – acoustic guitar
- Matt Munisteri – producing
- Armand Hirsch, Teddy Tuthill, Jon Ashley – engineering
- Dan Millice – mastering
- Matt Pfahlert – design

== Charts ==
| Year | Chart | Peak position | Source |
|---|---|---|---|
| 2015 | Billboard Jazz Albums | 19 | |
