= Room (Nels Cline and Julian Lage album) =

Studio album by Nels Cline and Julian Lage
- Released: November 25, 2014
- Recorded: December 1–3, 2013
- Genre: Rock, jazz
- Length: 56:46
- Label: Mack Avenue; MAC1091
- Producer: Nels Cline & Julian Lage

Nels Cline chronology
Woodstock Sessions Vol. 2 (2014)	Room (2014)	Macroscope (2015)

Julian Lage chronology
Avalon (2014)	Room (2014)	World's Fair (2015)

Room is an album by guitarists Nels Cline and Julian Lage which was released in November 2014 on the Mack Avenue label.

== Reception ==
Professional ratings
Review scores
Source	Rating
AllMusic	4/5 stars
The Irish Times	4/5 stars
All About Jazz	4.5/5 stars
Exclaim!	3/10

AllMusic awarded the album 4 stars out of 5, with reviewer Thom Jurek stating, "For all its starkness, on Room these players not only support one another, they create space for reconsideration and expansion. Cline takes Lage further out onto the improvisational ledge than he's ever been before, while Lage draws Cline toward a sense of lyricism and restraint he hasn't employed in many years. Room betrays no hesitation, displays no false moves, offers no space for safety. And that's just how this duo likes it. It is abundant in its offer of pleasure for fans of guitar jazz and it may even hold wider appeal for those who are drawn to in-the-moment musical creation". The Irish Times' Cormac Larkin rated the album 4 stars out of 5, saying, "Room is as fresh and creative a meeting of two musicians as you’ll find". JazzTimes' Mike Shanley said:, "Room is the sound of two clean, crisp guitars (each player alternates electric archtops and flat-top acoustics), one in each channel, and the discovery of a vast tract of common ground". Writing for All About Jazz, Matt Marshall stated "the musicianship of the two guitarists allows them to take every tune to a number of unexpected and exciting places... Each track has its own character, but the entire album is permeated by the two guitarists' inventiveness and sensitive accompanying ability". Exclaim!'s Nilan Perera was less enthusiastic, noting the album "ultimately sacrifices fire and emotion to an exchange of notes".

== Track listing ==
All compositions by Nels Cline except where noted.

1. "Abstract 12" (Julian Lage) - 1:47
2. "Racy" - 3:42
3. "The Scent of Light" - 9:29
4. "Whispers from Eve" - 7:24
5. "Blues, Too" - 7:02
6. "Odd End" - 2:52
7. "Amenette" - 3:24
8. "Freesia/The Bond" - 10:30
9. "Waxman" (Cline, Lage) - 5:59
10. "Calder" (Lage) - 4:37

== Personnel ==
- Nels Cline, Julian Lage – electric and acoustic guitars
