= Avalon (Julian Lage and Chris Eldridge album) =

Studio album by Julian Lage and Chris Eldridge
- Released: October 7, 2014
- Recorded: April 27–28, 2014
- Venue: The Avalon Theatre, Easton, Maryland
- Length: 44:52
- Label: Modern Lore
- Producer: Kenneth Pattengale

Julian Lage chronology
Free Flying (2013)	Avalon (2014)	Room (2014)

Chris Eldridge chronology
Who's Feeling Young Now? (2012)	Avalon (2014)	The Phosphorescent Blues (2015)

Avalon is an album by guitarists Julian Lage and Chris Eldridge, released in 2014. The album was produced and engineered by Kenneth Pattengale of The Milk Carton Kids and mastered by Dan Millice. It was recorded at the Avalon theatre in Easton, Maryland. On the album Lage plays a 000-18 Martin Guitar from 1939, and Eldridge plays a Martin D-18 from 1937. Lage and Eldridge have described the album as a “love letter to the acoustic guitar.”

This is the first full-length album that Lage and Eldridge have released together, but they previously put out an EP entitled "Close to Picture" which consisted of original compositions. Avalon has both covers and original songs, and includes instrumentals as well as tracks with vocals by Eldridge. Lage is considered to be a jazz guitarist while Eldridge comes from a bluegrass background, but the album spans a variety of genres.

== Reception ==
Guitar World said "Avalon is an unfiltered document of the pair’s live set, a mix of originals and covers that illustrate the breadth of the American songbook as Lage and Eldridge perceive it, incorporating bluegrass, country, gospel, old-time music and jazz. There was no playback, no overdubs, just the duo’s eloquent, in-the-moment musical repartee".

Pitchfork called it "a sophisticated guitar LP that doesn’t sound sophisticated, an effort that folds its intense erudition deep beneath its lovely surface".

== Track listing ==
1. "Stone Cross" (Julian Lage) – 3:33
2. "Mean Mother Blues" (John Starling) – 3:44
3. "Keep Me from Blowing Away" (Paul Craft) – 3:52
4. "Whiskey Before Breakfast" (Traditional) – 3:42
5. "Open up the Window, Noah" (Traditional) – 3:01
6. "Wilson's Waltz" (Lage) – 9:04
7. "Someone to Watch over Me" (George Gershwin, Ira Gershwin) – 4:18
8. "Ginseng Sullivan" (Norman Blake) – 3:33
9. "Steady Proof" (Lage) – 2:59
10. "Any Old Time" (Jimmie Rodgers) – 3:42
11. "Butter and Eggs" (Margaret Glaspy) – 3:24

== Personnel ==
- Chris Eldridge – guitar, vocals
- Julian Lage – guitar
- Kenneth Pattengale – engineering, production
- Dan Millice – mastering
