= Free Flying =

Live album by Fred Hersch & Julian Lage
- Released: September 3, 2013
- Recorded: February 14–16, 2013
- Venue: Jazz at Kitano, NYC
- Genre: Jazz
- Length: 52:45
- Label: Palmetto; PM 2168
- Producer: Fred Hersch; Julian Lage

Fred Hersch chronology
| Fun House (2013) | Free Flying (2013) | Floating (2014) |

Julian Lage chronology
| Close to Picture (2013) | Free Flying (2013) | Avalon (2014) |

Free Flying is a live album by pianist Fred Hersch and guitarist Julian Lage which was recorded in New York on February 14–16, 2013, and released later that year by Palmetto Records.

== Reception ==
Professional ratings
Review scores
| Source | Rating |
|---|---|
| AllMusic | 4.5/5 stars |
| All About Jazz | 5/5 stars |

The AllMusic review by Thom Jurek said, "It's quite rare when a jazz duet album between two complementary instruments is so intuitive it often sounds like the work of one player with multiple voices. Such is the case on Free Flying."

Victor L. Schermer of All About Jazz stated, "Hersch and Lage mesh superbly and have put together a coherent and listenable set of sophisticated improvisations which fuse baroque counterpoint, punctuated rhythms, and diverse jazz motifs in a disciplined yet exciting way. Simply by virtue of the close coordination of piano and guitar and tightness of performance, the album points up the continuity of music from Bach to bop to modernity, and in this respect represents something of a measuring rod for the development of jazz forms."

For JazzTimes, Bill Beuttler wrote, "Pianist Fred Hersch and guitarist Julian Lage are similarly masterful players and likeminded souls. Though primarily jazz improvisers, they share affinities for new collaborations, classical forms and soft yet intense dynamics. If they're more than a generation apart in age, no matter ... Their extraordinary new live recording, Free Flying, stems from a chance meeting in a coffee shop in Boston, a city in which both men have studied and taught. Private sessions led to their performing as a duo this past February at New York City's Jazz at Kitano, where the program included seven Hersch compositions, most recorded at least once previously and five dedicated to artists he holds dear."

== Track listing ==
All tracks are written by Fred Hersch except where noted.

| No. | Title | Writer(s) | Length |
|---|---|---|---|
| 1. | "Song Without Words #4: Duet" | | 6:54 |
| 2. | "Down Home" | | 5:53 |
| 3. | "Heartland" | | 4:57 |
| 4. | "Free Flying" | | 5:04 |
| 5. | "Beatrice" | Sam Rivers | 5:29 |
| 6. | "Song Without Words #3: Tango" | | 5:45 |
| 7. | "Stealthiness" | | 5:16 |
| 8. | "Gravity's Pull" | | 7:03 |
| 9. | "Monk's Dream" | Thelonious Monk | 6:24 |
| Total length: | | | 52:45 |

== Personnel ==
Musicians

- Fred Hersch – piano; producer, liner notes
- Julian Lage – guitar; producer

Production

- Geoff Countryman, Tyler McDiarmid – recording engineer
- A.T. Michael MacDonald – mastering, mixing
- John Rogers – photography
