= Devotion (Margaret Glaspy album) =

Studio album by Margaret Glaspy
- Released: March 27, 2020
- Label: ATO

Margaret Glaspy chronology
| Born Yesterday (2018) | Devotion (2020) | Echo the Diamond (2023) |

Devotion is the second studio album by American musician Margaret Glaspy. It was released on March 27, 2020 under ATO Records.

== Critical reception ==
Professional ratings
Aggregate scores
| Source | Rating |
|---|---|
| Metacritic | 72/100 |
Review scores
| Source | Rating |
| AllMusic | 3.5/5 stars |
| DIY | 4/5 stars |
| Paste | 7.8/10 |
| Pitchfork | 5.3/10 |

Devotion was met with generally favorable reviews from critics. At Metacritic, which assigns a weighted average rating out of 100 to reviews from mainstream publications, this release received an average score of 72, based on 6 reviews. BBC Radio 6 Music declared Devotion one of the twenty essential albums released in the first six months of 2020.

== Track listing ==
Devotion track listing
| No. | Title | Length |
|---|---|---|
| 1. | "Killing What Keeps Us Alive" | 3:19 |
| 2. | "Without Him" | 3:37 |
| 3. | "Young Love" | 4:05 |
| 4. | "You've Got My Number" | 4:12 |
| 5. | "Stay With Me" | 3:37 |
| 6. | "So Wrong It's Right" | 3:16 |
| 7. | "Heartbreak" | 4:16 |
| 8. | "You Amaze Me" | 2:13 |
| 9. | "Devotion" | 3:57 |
| 10. | "Vicious" | 2:39 |
| 11. | "What's the Point" | 2:54 |
| 12. | "Consequences" | 3:32 |
