= Peace (Dayna Stephens album) =

Studio album by Dayna Stephens
- Released: November 4, 2014
- Label: Sunnyside
- Producer: Matt Pierson

Peace is an album by saxophonist Dayna Stephens.

== Music and release ==
This was Stephens' fifth recording as leader. The other musicians are pianist Brad Mehldau, guitarist Julian Lage, bassist Larry Grenadier, and drummer Eric Harland. The tracks are mostly ballads. The title track "launches with Stephens blowing breathy, Mehldau filling in spaces gingerly, Harland brushing breezily. It stays that way for a good couple of minutes until Mehldau finds an opening; Stephens, not one to spoil the mood, takes the cue and maintains the hush."

The album was released by Sunnyside Records on November 4, 2014.

== Reception ==
Professional ratings
Review scores
Source	Rating
PopMatters	7/10 stars

The PopMatters reviewer concluded that, "on Peace the leader is at his most contemplative and warm".

== Track listing ==
1. "Peace" – 6:34
2. "I Left My Heart in San Francisco" – 4:59
3. "Zingaro" – 7:48
4. "The Good Life" – 6:31
5. "The Duke" – 3:58
6. "Brothers" (From The Mission) – 1:43
7. "Deborah's Theme" (From Once Upon a Time in America) – 4:00
8. "Oblivion" – 4:59
9. "Body and Soul" – 6:32
10. "Two for the Road" – 6:09
11. "Moonglow" – 3:38

== Personnel ==
- Dayna Stephens – baritone sax, tenor sax, soprano sax
- Brad Mehldau – piano
- Julian Lage - guitar
- Larry Grenadier - bass
- Eric Harland - drums
