= Blue Whale Jazz Club =

Former jazz club in Los Angeles, California

- Address: 3229 Casitas Ave, Los Angeles, CA 90039-2205; USA
- Location: Los Angeles
- Owner: Joon Lee
- Event: Jazz

Construction
- Opened: 2009
- Closed: December 31, 2020

Website
- www.bluewhalemusic.com

The Blue Whale was a jazz club located on the top floor of Weller Plaza in downtown Los Angeles. The club was opened in 2009 by jazz vocalist Joon Lee and regularly featured regional and internationally acclaimed jazz artists. It was announced on December 31, 2020 that the club has been permanently closed.

In early November, 2024, the Blue Whale announced they were re-opening at a new location in the Atwater Village area of los Angeles at 3229 Casitas Ave, Los Angeles, CA 90039-2205. An open house of the new location was presented on Nov. 10 2024.

== See also ==
- List of jazz clubs
