= Lunar Vacation =

American indie rock band

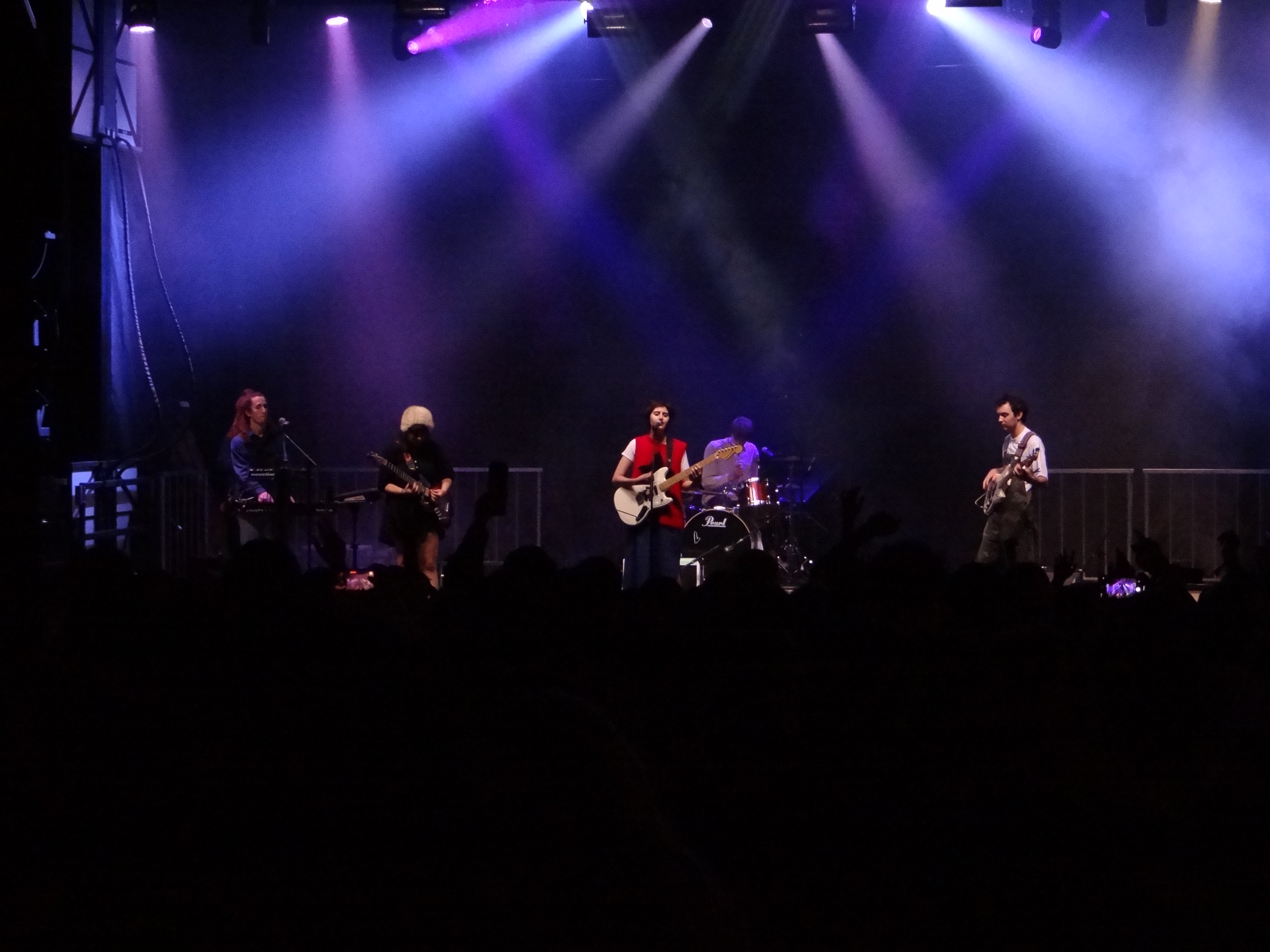
- Lunar Vacation in 2021

Background information
- Origin: Atlanta, Georgia
- Genre: Indie rock
- Years active: 2016-present
- Label: Keeled Scales
- Members: Gep Repasky; Maggie Geeslin; Matteo DeLurgio; Connor Dowd; Ben Wulkan
- Past members: John Michael Young

Lunar Vacation are an American indie rock band from Atlanta, Georgia. The band consists of Gep Repasky, on vocals and guitar, Maggie Geeslin, on guitar, Matteo DeLurgio, on keyboard and various percussion, Connor Dowd, on drums and Ben Wulkan on Bass.

== History ==
Lunar Vacation formed in 2016 while in high school after a teacher suggested that Gep and Maggie should start a band, they later jammed with John Michael Young and Connor Dowd and ended up recruiting them. In 2017, after their first keyboard player left, they recruited Matteo DeLurgio. They released their first EP in 2017 titled Swell. The group released their second EP, Artificial Flavors, in 2018.

In 2019 John Michael Young parted ways with the band and decided to go solo. In 2021, the band released their debut full-length album through Keeled Scales called Inside Every Fig Is A Dead Wasp. The album was produced by Daniel Gleason of Grouplove.

In June 2024 the band announced their sophomore album Everything Matters, Everything's Fire and released the first single Set the Stage.

== Discography ==
=== Studio albums ===
- Inside Every Fig is a Dead Wasp (2021)
- Everything Matters, Everything's Fire (2024)

=== EPs ===
- Swell (2017)
- Artificial Flavors (2018)
