= Dan Millice =

American mastering engineer

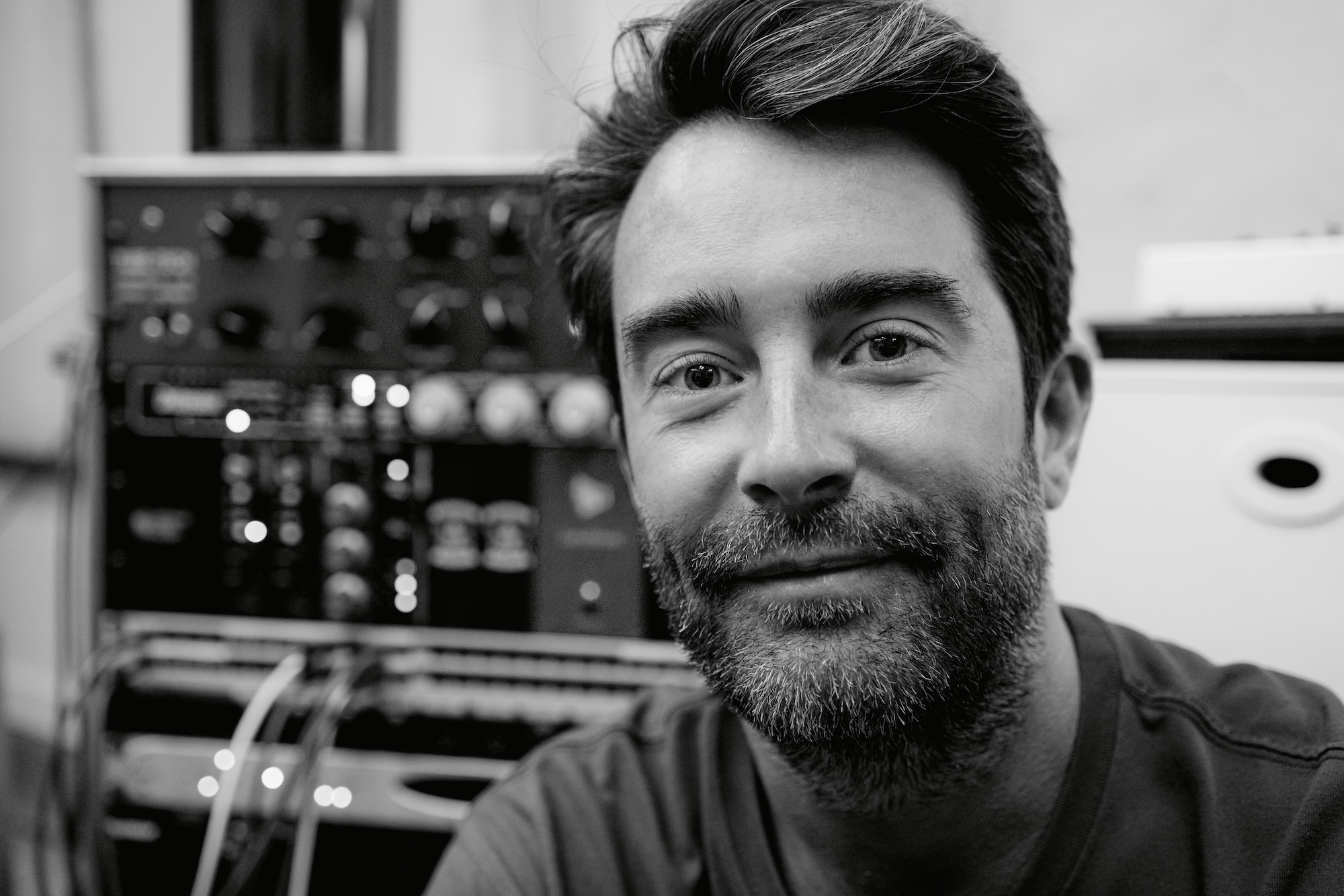
- Millice in 2024
- Born: July 12, 1988 (age 37); Charlotte, North Carolina, US
- Education: Appalachian State University
- Occupation: Mastering Engineer
- Years active: 2010–present
- Website: millicemastering.com

Dan Millice is an American mastering engineer based in New York City.

== Background and career ==
Dan Millice was born in Charlotte, North Carolina and graduated from Appalachian State University with a bachelor's degree in Music Industry Studies. He began his mastering career at Masterdisk before a spending a decade as a full-time mastering engineer at Engine Room Audio.

Millice has mastered albums for ASAP Rocky, Terri Lyne Carrington, Dolly Parton, Julian Lage, Béla Fleck, The Blind Boys of Alabama, Rosanne Cash, Sia, Lakecia Benjamin, Kehlani, Trey Songz, French Montana, Cyhi the Prynce, 50 Cent, The Rumble feat. Chief Joseph Boudreaux, Lola Brooke, Calboy, Lunar Vacation, The Happy Fits, and others.

== Awards and nominations ==
=== Grammy Awards ===
Year	Nominee	Category	Result
2018	Julian Lage – Modern Lore	Best Contemporary Instrumental Album	Nominated
2021	Cha Wa – My People	Best Regional Roots Album	Nominated
2021	The Blind Boys of Alabama & Béla Fleck – I Wish I Knew How It Would Feel To Be Free	Best American Roots Performance	Nominated
2022	Terri Lyne Carrington, Kris Davis, Linda May Han Oh, Nicholas Payton, & Matthew Stevens – New Standards Vol. 1	Best Jazz Instrumental Album	Won
2022	The Blind Boys of Alabama Featuring Black Violin – The Message	Best Americana Performance	Nominated
2022	Ambrose Akinmusire – Rounds (Live)	Best Improvised Jazz Solo	Nominated
2023	Dolly Parton – The Last Thing On My Mind	Grammy Award for Best Country Solo Performance	Nominated
2023	The Rumble feat. Chief Joseph Boudreaux Jr. – Live At The Maple Leaf	Best Regional Roots Album	Nominated
2023	Lakecia Benjamin – Basquiat	Best Jazz Performance	Nominated
2023	Lakecia Benjamin Featuring Angela Davis – Amerikkan Skin	Grammy Award for Best Instrumental Composition	Nominated
2023	Lakecia Benjamin – Phoenix	Best Jazz Instrumental Album	Nominated
2024	Lakecia Benjamin – Phoenix Reimagined (Live)	Best Jazz Instrumental Album	Nominated
2024	The Rumble feat. Chief Joseph Boudreaux Jr. – Stories From The Battlefield	Best Regional Roots Album	Nominated
2024	Lakecia Benjamin feat. Randy Brecker, Jeff "Tain" Watts & John Scofield – Phoenix Reimagined (Live)	Best Jazz Performance	Nominated
2025	Terri Lyne Carrington & Christie Dashiell – We Insist 2025!	Best Jazz Vocal Album	Nominated
2025	Lakecia Benjamin – Noble Rise	Best Jazz Performance	Nominated

=== Latin Grammy Awards ===
Year	Nominee	Category	Result
2016	Boogarins – Manual	Best Portuguese Language Rock or Alternative Album	Nominated

=== Libera Awards ===
Year	Nominee	Category	Result
2022	The Blind Boys of Alabama & Béla Fleck – I Wish I Knew How It Would Feel To Be Free	Best Spiritual Record	Won
2025	Lakecia Benjamin – Phoenix Reimagined (Live)	Best Jazz Record	Nominated

=== Lower Great Lakes Emmy Awards ===
Year	Nominee	Result
2022	Cleveland International Film Festival 45th Anniversary – Trailer	Won

=== Webby Awards ===
Year	Nominee	Category	Result
2025	The Gregory Brothers feat. "Weird Al" Yankovic – "Deja Vu (But Worse)"	People's Choice Award	Won
