= Margaret Glaspy =

American singer-songwriter

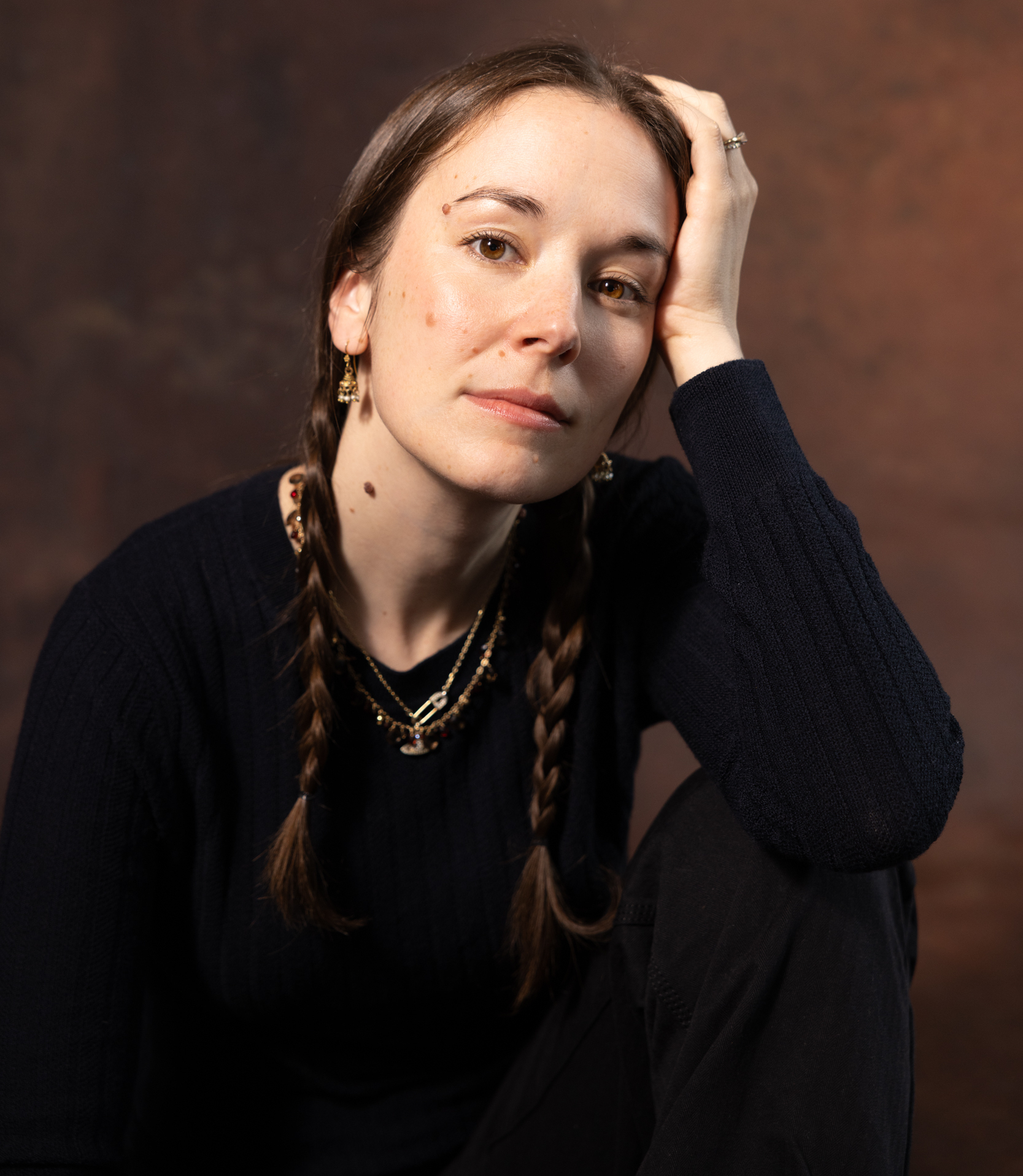
- Glaspy in 2025

Background information
- Born: Margaret Michelle Glaspy; January 22, 1989 (age 37); Sacramento, California, U.S.
- Origin: Red Bluff, California, U.S.
- Genres: Rock, pop
- Instruments: Guitar, fiddle
- Years active: 2010–present
- Label: ATO
- Spouse: Julian Lage
- Website: margaretglaspy.com

Margaret Glaspy is an American singer and songwriter based in New York City. She began playing and living in New York at 21 years old and is currently signed with ATO Records. Her debut full-length album, Emotions and Math, was self-produced and received critical acclaim, while her subsequent records have followed suit, from her EP Born Yesterday to her second full-length Devotion.

== Early life and education ==
Glaspy was born in Sacramento on January 22, 1989, and grew up in Red Bluff, California. Sharing a room with her older sister, Glaspy was exposed at a young age to popular Nineties artists such as No Doubt, Beck, Weezer, and Lauryn Hill. She took up the fiddle in third grade and began playing guitar and trombone in high school. At sixteen, she decided to focus exclusively on the guitar. She later received an educational grant and attended the Berklee College of Music in Boston. She was only able to afford to attend college for one semester, but continued to sneak into workshops and masterclasses on the campus. Glaspy eventually dropped out of college and began performing around Boston.

== Career and personal life ==
Glaspy began her solo career by releasing an EP in July 2012 titled Homeschool. She signed to ATO Records in 2015 and in January 2016, released a 7-inch EP, which included "You and I" and "Somebody to Anybody". These songs were later included on the 2016 album Emotions and Math.

Early in 2019 Glaspy played on a North American tour with Neko Case and Kimya Dawson.

Glaspy released her second full-length album on March 27, 2020, titled Devotion. Her third full-length album, Echo the Diamond, was released on August 18, 2023. Her album I Am Both is scheduled to release on August 7, 2026.

She is married to guitarist Julian Lage.

== Discography ==
=== Solo ===
- Homeschool EP (2012, self-released)
- If & When EP (2013, self-released)
- You and I b/w Somebody to Anybody 7-inch (2016, ATO Records)
- Emotions and Math (2016, ATO Records)
- Born Yesterday EP (2018, ATO Records)
- Devotion (2020, ATO Records)
- Echo the Diamond (2023, ATO Records)
- The Golden Heart Protector (2025, ATO Records)
- I Am Both (2026, ATO Records)

=== With the Fundies ===
- The Fundies EP (2012, self-released)

=== Collaborations ===
- Jayme Stone's Lomax Project (2015, Borealis)
