= Julian Lage =

American guitarist and composer (born 1987)

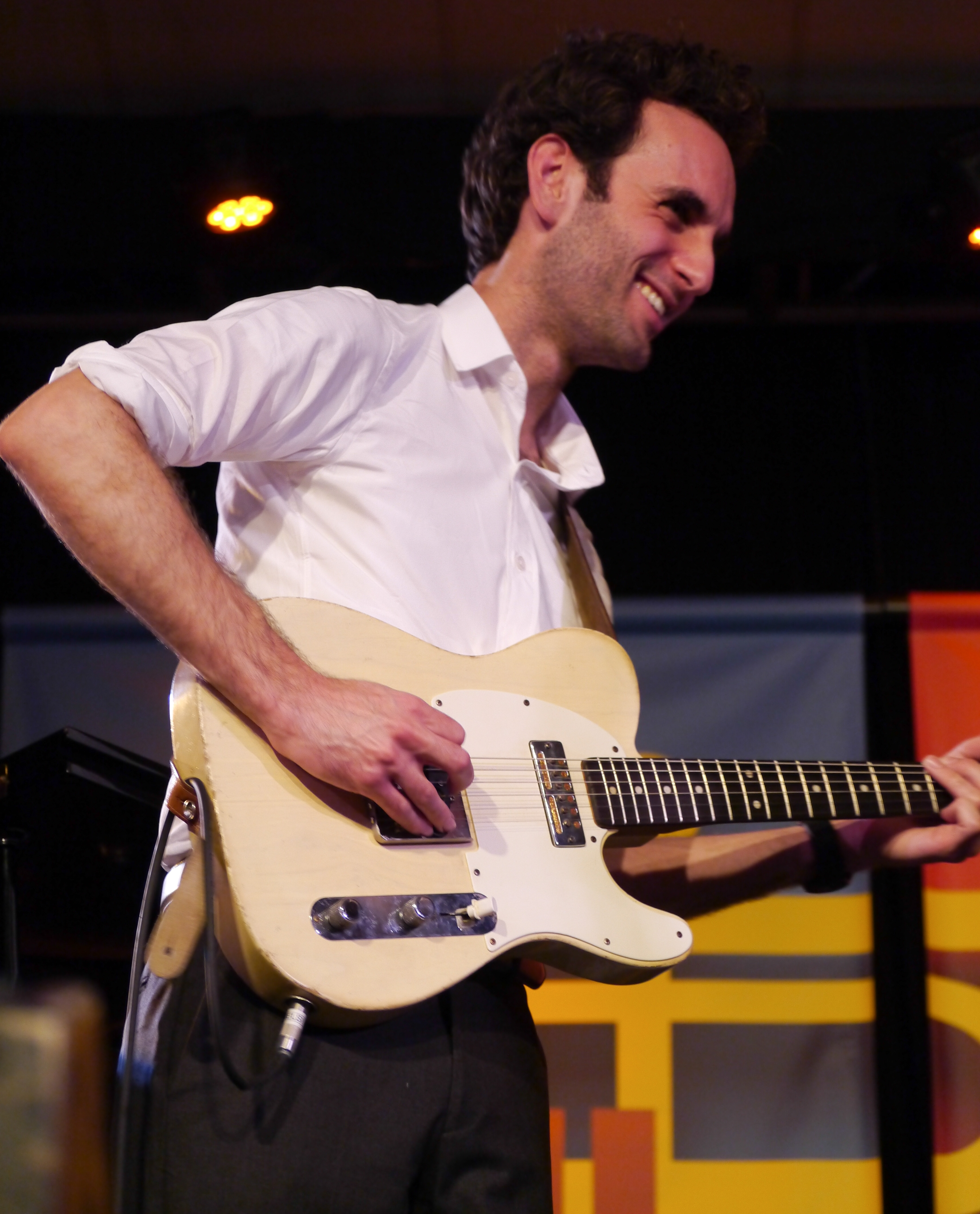
- Lage at the Monterey Jazz Festival, 2014

Background information
- Born: Julian Price Lage; December 25, 1987 (age 38); Santa Rosa, California, U.S.
- Genres: Jazz
- Occupations: Musician; composer
- Instrument: Guitar
- Years active: 2000–present
- Labels: EmArcy; Mack Avenue; Blue Note
- Spouse: Margaret Glaspy
- Website: www.julianlage.com

Julian Price Lage (/lɑːʒ/ LAHZH; born December 25, 1987) is an American guitarist and composer.

A child prodigy, Lage performed at the 2000 Grammy Awards at age 12, and at 15, became a faculty member of the Stanford Jazz Workshop. He released his debut album, Sounding Point, in 2009 on EmArcy Records. He was signed to Blue Note Records in 2021, with whom he has released the albums Squint (2021), View with a Room (2022), The Layers EP (2023), Speak to Me (2024), and Scenes from Above (2026).

Lage currently teaches ensembles and guitar at The New School's School of Jazz and Contemporary Music in New York City and performs in Bob Dylan's touring band.

== Early life and career ==
Lage was born in Santa Rosa, California, and is the youngest of five children. His father, Mario, is a visual artist, and his mother is of Jewish heritage (although he did not grow up in a religious household). A child prodigy, Lage was the subject of the 1996 short documentary film Jules at Eight. At 12, he performed at the 2000 Grammy Awards. Three years later, he became a faculty member of the Stanford Jazz Workshop at Stanford University. Classically trained at the San Francisco Conservatory of Music, he has studied at Sonoma State University and the Ali Akbar College of Music. He graduated from the Berklee College of Music in 2008.

On March 24, 2009, EmArcy released his debut album Sounding Point to favorable reviews. It was nominated at the 2010 Grammy Awards for Best Contemporary Jazz Album. His second album, Gladwell, was released April 26, 2011, to positive reviews. His first solo acoustic album, World's Fair, was released on March 2, 2015, and his fourth album, Arclight, was released on March 11, 2016.

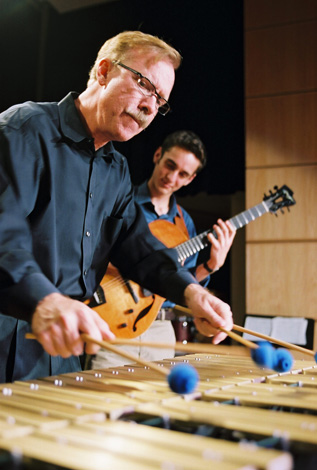
Lage (right) performing with Gary Burton

In a 2016 interview promoting Arclight, on the NPR program Fresh Air, Lage revealed that around the time of the release of World's Fair, he struggled with focal dystonia, a neurological disorder resulting from the repeated performance of tasks. The disorder caused spasms in his left arm and hand while trying to play the guitar. He believed that the condition was brought on at age five from playing and gripping the neck of his guitar too hard, because the guitar was bigger than he was. At the time, he believed that was what he needed to do to "sound official ... and [not] drop the guitar". He had to "re-learn how to play the guitar in a way that addressed these tendencies that got [him] in trouble in the first place".

He has worked in a trio with bassist Scott Colley and drummer Kenny Wollesen and has recorded duo albums with guitarists Chris Eldridge, Gyan Riley, and Nels Cline. For the 2017 guitar duo album Mount Royal, Lage and Eldridge received a Grammy nomination for Best Contemporary Instrumental Album.

Lage is currently a faculty member at the School of Jazz and Contemporary Music at The New School in New York City, where he teaches ensembles and guitar. He has taught at the New England Conservatory of Music.

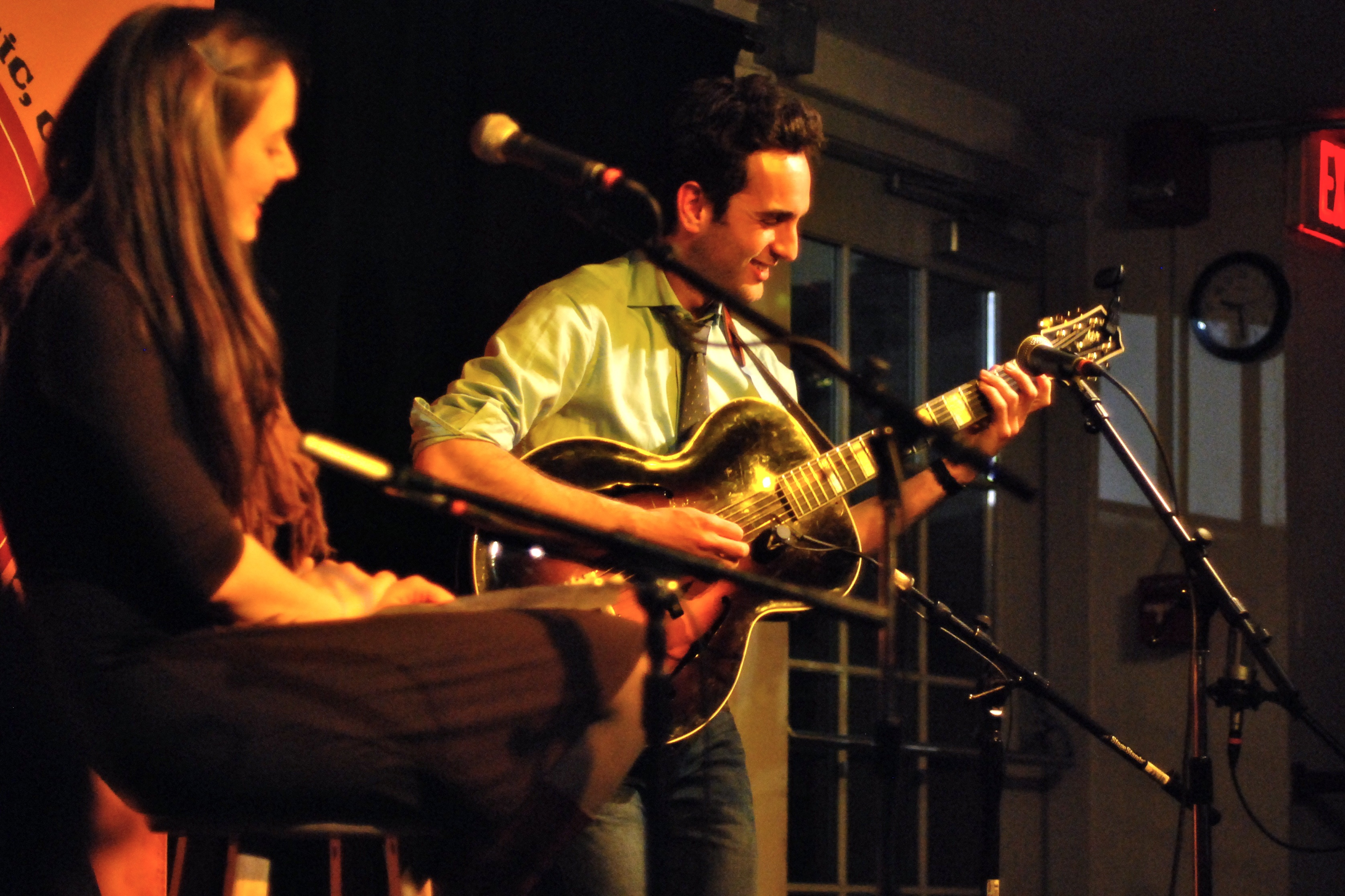
Lage (right) with Margaret Glaspy at Club Passim in 2010

On March 17, 2021, it was announced that he signed to Blue Note Records. Along with the announcement, it was announced that his debut release on the label, entitled Squint, would be released on June 11. The lead single "Saint Rose" was released on that day as well. April 9 saw the release of the second single, "Boo's Blues".

View with a Room was released on September 16, 2022. The lead single, "Auditorium", was released on June 21. This was followed by "Word for Word", the second single, which was released on July 13, the third, "Tributary", released on August 10, and the fourth, "Chavez", released on August 31.

On November 14, 2023, Lage released the single "Omission", continuing to use the acoustic instrumentation found on his EP The Layers, which was released on March 17, 2023.

== Discography ==
=== As leader/co-leader ===
- Sounding Point (EmArcy, 2009)
- Gladwell (EmArcy, 2011)
- Close to Picture with Chris Eldridge (self-released, 2013)
- Free Flying with Fred Hersch (Palmetto, 2013)
- Avalon with Chris Eldridge (Modern Lore, 2014)
- Room with Nels Cline (Mack Avenue, 2014)
- World's Fair (Modern Lore, 2015)
- Arclight (Mack Avenue, 2016)
- Live in Los Angeles (Mack Avenue, 2016)
- Mount Royal with Chris Eldridge (Free Dirt, 2017)
- Modern Lore (Mack Avenue, 2018)
- Love Hurts (Mack Avenue, 2019)
- Squint (Blue Note, 2021)
- View with a Room (Blue Note, 2022)
- The Layers EP (Blue Note, 2023)
- Speak to Me (Blue Note, 2024)
- Scenes from Above (Blue Note, 2026)

=== As sideman ===
With Gary Burton

- Generations (Concord Jazz, 2004)
- Next Generation (Concord Jazz, 2005)
- Common Ground (Mack Avenue, 2011)
- Guided Tour (Mack Avenue, 2013)

With John Zorn

- Midsummer Moons (Tzadik, 2017)
- Insurrection (Tzadik, 2018)
- Salem 1692 (Tzadik, 2018)
- The Book Beri'ah Vol. 4 – Chesed (Tzadik, 2018)
- Nove Cantici Per Francesco D'Assisi (Tzadik, 2019)
- Virtue (Tzadik, 2020)
- Songs for Petra (Tzadik, 2020)
- Teresa De Ávila (Tzadik, 2021)
- Parables (Tzadik, 2021)
- New Masada Quartet (Tzadik, 2021)
- John Zorn's Bagatelles Vol. 10 (Tzadik, 2022)
- A Garden of Forking Paths (Tzadik, 2022)
- Incerto (Tzadik, 2022)
- New Masada Quartet Volume Two (Tzadik, 2023)
- Multiplicities II (Tzadik, 2023)
- Quatrain (Tzadik, 2023)
- Full Fathom Five (Tzadik, 2023)
- Homenaje A Remedios Varo (Tzadik, 2023)
- Nothing Is as Real as Nothing (Tzadik, 2023)
- Her Melodious Lay (Tzadik, 2024)
- Lamentations (Tzadik, 2024)
- New Masada Quartet, Vol. 3 (Tzadik, 2024)

With others

- Terri Lyne Carrington, More to Say (E1, 2009)
- Nels Cline, Lovers (Blue Note, 2016)
- Nels Cline, Currents, Constellations (Blue Note, 2018)
- Kris Davis, Duopoly (Pyroclastic, 2016)
- Virgil Donati, Ruination (Gildon Music, 2019)
- Dave Douglas, Uplift Twelve Pieces for Positive Action (Greenleaf Music, 2018)
- Taylor Eigsti, Lucky to Be Me (Concord Jazz, 2006)
- Taylor Eigsti, Let It Come to You (Concord Jazz, 2008)
- David Grisman, Dawg Duos (Acoustic Disc, 1999)
- Eric Harland, Voyager: Live by Night (Space Time, 2011)
- Eric Harland, Vipassana (GSI, 2014)
- Jesse Harris, No Wrong No Right (Dangerbird, 2015)
- Charles Lloyd, 8: Kindred Spirits (Live from the Lobero) (Blue Note, 2020)
- Charles Lloyd, Trios: Sacred Thread (Blue Note, 2022)
- Sophie Milman, In the Moonlight (E1, 2011)
- Yoko Ono, Take Me to the Land of Hell (Chimera Music, 2013)
- Dayna Stephens, Today Is Tomorrow (Criss Cross, 2012)
- Dayna Stephens, Peace (Sunnyside, 2014)

== Awards and nominations ==
Julian Lage awards and nominations
Awards and nominations
| Award | Wins | Nominations |
| Grammy Awards | 0 | 3 |
| Independent Music Awards | 1 | 1 |

Totals (Note: Certain award groups do not simply award one winner. They acknowledge several different recipients, have runners-up, and have third place. Since this is a specific recognition and is different from losing an award, runner-up mentions are considered wins in this award tally. For simplification and to avoid errors, each award in this list has been presumed to have had a prior nomination.)
- Wins: 1
- Nominations: 4

| Year | Nominated work | Event | Award | Result |
|---|---|---|---|---|
| 2010 | Sounding Point | Grammy Awards | Best Contemporary Jazz Album | Nominated |
| 2018 | Mount Royal (With Chris Eldridge) | Grammy Awards | Best Contemporary Instrumental Album | Nominated |
| 2018 | Mount Royal (With Chris Eldridge) | Independent Music Awards | Best Instrumental Album | Won |
| 2019 | Modern Lore | Grammy Awards | Best Contemporary Instrumental Album | Nominated |
| 2024 | The Layers EP | Grammy Awards | Best Contemporary Instrumental Album | Nominated |
| 2025 | Speak to Me | Grammy Awards | Best Contemporary Instrumental Album | Nominated |
