= Jorge Roeder =

Peruvian bass player and composer (born 1980)

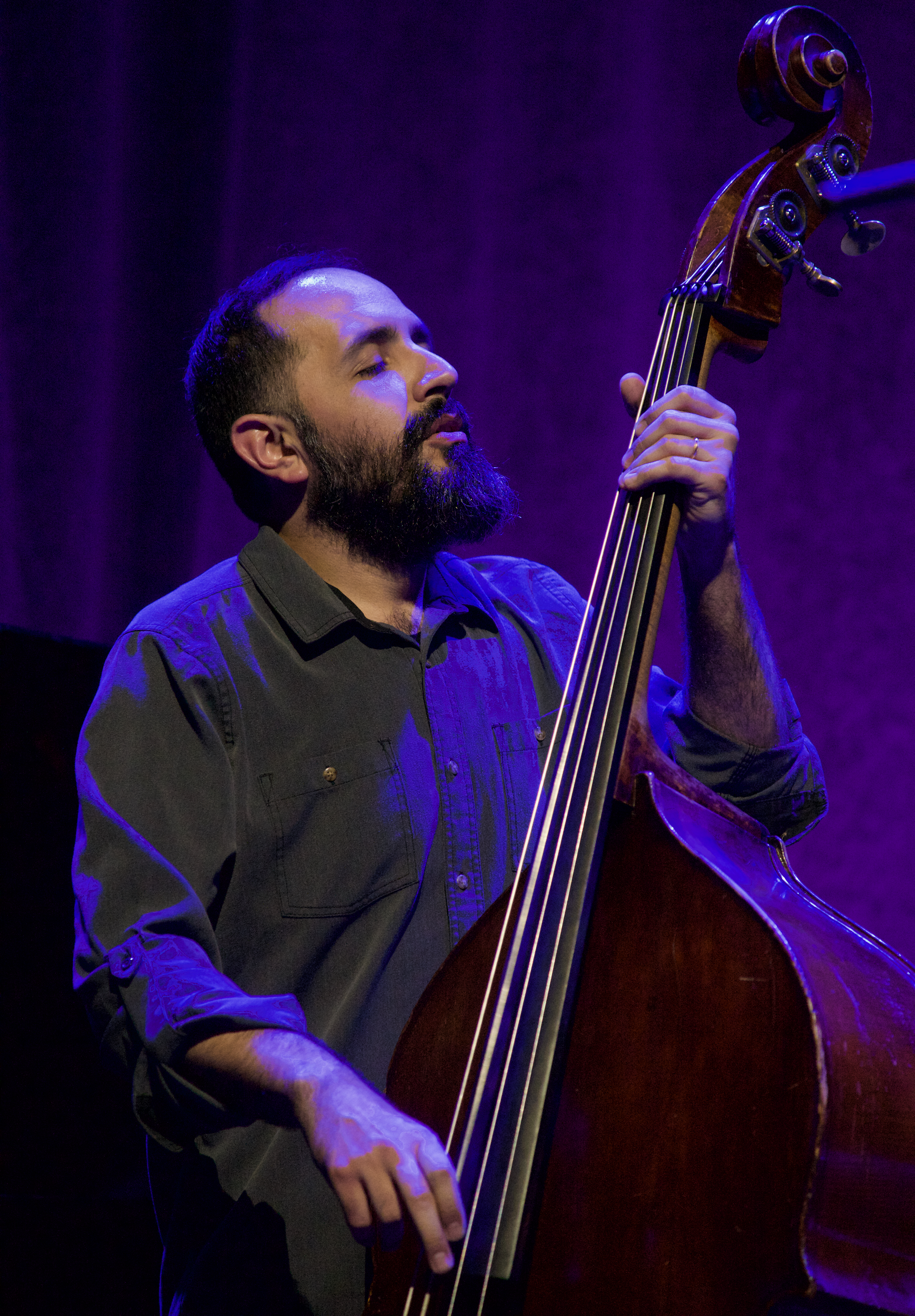

Background information
- Born: 26 May 1980 (age 46); Lima, Peru
- Genre: jazz
- Occupations: musician, composer
- Instruments: bass guitar, double bass
- Years active: 1998–present
- Website: www.jorgeroeder.com

Jorge Roeder is a Peruvian bass player and composer. He has performed and collaborated with many jazz artists including Gary Burton, Nels Cline and John Zorn. As part of the Julian Lage Group, he received a 2010 Grammy nomination for Best Contemporary Jazz Album, for Sounding Point.

In 2020, Roeder released his first solo album, El Suelo Mío.

== Early life ==
Roeder was born in Lima, Peru and at 14 took cello and electric bass lessons. At 16, he went to Russia to further his study of the cello for a few months. At 18, he took up the double bass. In 2001, he was appointed assistant principal bassist for the Lima Philharmonic and Opera orchestras.

As a fixture on the local rock scene, his first professional recording job was as bassist for the Lima heavy metal band, Ni Voz Ni Voto, on their self-titled debut album released in 2000. Roeder met trumpeter/educator Gabriel Alegría, and performed with him at the 2002 IAJE Conference. There he was noticed by Ken Schaphorst, chair of jazz studies at Boston's New England Conservatory, and was invited to audition for the school.

In 2002, Roeder was given a scholarship New England Conservatory of Music to study jazz. Upon completion of his degree in 2005, he stayed in Boston two more years, before he moved to Brooklyn, New York and took gigs in the city's jazz scene.

== Musical collaborations ==
In New York, Roeder got together with artists such as guitarist Julian Lage and pianist Shai Maestro, and began long-standing recording and performing relationships with both.

Roeder's style of playing gelled in that group context. "When we’re about to do a set we all get together backstage. Julian will say something like ‘Let’s keep the idea of patience in our heads, and hold it as much as you can.’ And we'll really try to keep that concept in mind. We’re playing the same music, but it comes out different every time with the help of one word," he told the Boston Globe.

In 2005, Roeder's first jazz recording was on the Before The Storm album from Dan Tepfer. The following year, he appeared on trombonist Michael Dessen's Lineal album, and then again he played with Tepfer on Oxygen, released in 2009.

In 2010, Roeder was nominated for a Best Contemporary Jazz Album Grammy, as a bandmember of the Julian Lage Group and his work on the group's Sounding Point.

Over the years, Roeder played with various bandleaders including trombonist Ryan Keberle, vocalist Thana Alexa, vibraphonist Gary Burton, guitarist Nels Cline, saxophonist John Zorn, vocalist Sofia Rei, pianist and accordionist Carmen Staaf, guitarist Brad Shepik, saxophonist Dan Blake, vocalist Ulita Knaus, among others.

== Recognition ==
Roeder won the International Society of Bassists Jazz Competition in 2007, and reached the semi-finals of the Thelonious Monk Jazz Bass Competition in 2009.

== Solo career ==
In July 2020, Roeder released his debut solo album, El Suelo Mío, a collection that Bass Musician magazine called "thirteen tracks of unadulterated upright bass at its finest." A recording of solely bass music, the album reflects his Peruvian background, and was self-produced.

“El Suelo Mío can be interpreted as ‘the floor of mine’ or ‘the ground of mine’, which I attribute to references to the role of the bass in music. The bass is usually regarded as the foundation of any musical rendition, and the way I see music is and has always been through the lens of the bass part. So when I present this body of work, it comes from the roots, the ‘ground’ of the music that is a part of me."

On the United States’ Presidential election day on 3 November 2020, Roeder performed in the live streaming Deep Tones for Peace 2020, a public Facebook group formed by bassists Mark Dresser and William Parker the previous August with the mission for all bass players "to musically send healing vibrations to be felt worldwide." Membership is over 2,000 international bass players.

== Discography ==
Year	Album	Artist	Label
2005	Ojala	Sofia Rei	Cascabelera
2005	Before The Storm	Dan Tepfer	DIZ Productions
2005	Homework	Richie Barshay	Barshay Music
2007	Oxygen	Dan Tepfer	DIZ Productions
2009	Sounding Point	Julian Lage	Emarcy
2009	Sube Azul	Sofia Rei	Lilihouse Music
2009	Bien Sur	Emilio Solla	Fresh Sound
2011	Gladwell	Julian Lage	Emarcy
2011	Across The Way	Brad Shepik	Songlines
2011	Augmented Reality	Augmented Reality	Daywood Drive
2012	Primero Amarillo Después Malva	Lara Bello	Galileo Music Communications
2012	Shai Maestro Trio	Shai Maestro	Laborie
2012	De Tierra y Oro	Sofia Rei	Lilihouse Music
2013	The Road To Ithaca	Shai Maestro	Laborie
2013	Music Is Emotion	Ryan Keberle and Catharsis	Greenleaf
2014	Into The Zone	Ryan Keberle and Catharsis	Greenleaf
2014	Second Half	Emilio Solla	Emilio Solla Music
2014	Sanctuary	Richie Barshay	Barshay Music
2014	Ode To Heroes	Thana Alexa	Jazz Village
2014	Lonely City	Allegra Levy	SteepleChase LookOut
2015	Untold Stories	Shai Maestro	Laborie
2016	The Stone Skipper	Shai Maestro	Sound Surveyor
2016	Azul Infinito	Ryan Keberle and Catharsis	Greenleaf
2016	Expanding Heart	Jarrett Cherner	Bald Hill Records
2017	Find The Common, Shine The Light	Ryan Keberle and Catharsis	Greenleaf
2018	The Dream Thief	Shai Maestro	ECM
2019	Love Hurts	Julian Lage	Mack Avenue
2019	The Hope I Hold	Ryan Keberle and Catharsis	Greenleaf
2020	Songs For Petra	John Zorn	Tzadik
2020	Azoth	John Zorn	Tzadik
2020	El Suelo Mío	Jorge Roeder	T-TOWN
2021	Heaven And Earth Magick	John Zorn	Tzadik
2021	Squint	Julian Lage	Blue Note
2021	Human	Shai Maestro	ECM
