= The Crusaders discography =

This is the discography for American jazz band The Crusaders.

== Albums as The Jazz Crusaders ==
Year	Title	Chart positions			Label
Year	Title	US Pop	US R&B	US Jazz	Label
1961	Freedom Sound	—	—	—	Pacific Jazz
1962	Lookin' Ahead	—	—	—	Pacific Jazz
1963	Tough Talk	—	—	—	Pacific Jazz
1963	Heat Wave	—	—	—	Pacific Jazz
1963	Jazz Waltz (with Les McCann)	—	—	—	Pacific Jazz
1964	Stretchin' Out	—	—	—	Pacific Jazz
1965	The Thing	—	—	—	Pacific Jazz
1965	Chile Con Soul	—	—	—	Pacific Jazz
1966	Talk That Talk	—	—	—	Pacific Jazz
1967	Uh Huh	—	—	—	Pacific Jazz
1968	Powerhouse	184	38	6	Pacific Jazz
1970	Give Peace a Chance	—	—	—	Liberty
1970	Old Socks New Shoes – New Socks Old Shoes	90	12	6	Chisa
"—" denotes releases that did not chart or were not released in that territory.

== Compilations as The Jazz Crusaders ==
Year	Title	Chart positions	Label
Year	Title	US Jazz	Label
1969	The Best of the Jazz Crusaders	13	Blue Note
1973	Tough Talk	—	Blue Note
1975	The Young Rabbits	—	Blue Note
1993	The Best Of...	—	Pacific Jazz
2005	The Pacific Jazz Quintet Studio Sessions	—	Mosiac
"—" denotes releases that did not chart.

== Albums as Jazz Crusaders (Wayne Henderson & Wilton Felder) ==
Year	Title	Chart positions	Label	
Year	Title	Chart positions	Label	US Jazz
1994	Happy Again	13	Sin-Drome	
1996	Louisiana Hot Sauce	—	Sin-Drome	
1998	Breakin' Da Rulz!	—	Indigo Blue	
2003	Soul Axess	—	Indigo Blue	
"—" denotes releases that did not chart.

== Albums as The Crusaders ==
Year	Title	Chart positions				Label
Year	Title	US Pop	US R&B	US Jazz	UK	Label
1971	Pass the Plate	168	—	12	—	Chisa
1972	Hollywood	—	45	—	—	MoWest
1972	Crusaders 1	96	29	3	—	Blue Thumb
1973	The 2nd Crusade	45	4	1	—	Blue Thumb
1973	Unsung Heroes	173	33	—	—	Blue Thumb
1974	Southern Comfort	31	3	1	—	Blue Thumb
1975	Chain Reaction	26	9	1	—	Blue Thumb
1976	Those Southern Knights	38	9	2	—	Blue Thumb
1977	Free as the Wind	41	8	1	—	Blue Thumb
1978	Images	34	18	1	—	Blue Thumb
1979	Street Life	18	3	1	10	MCA
1980	Rhapsody and Blues	29	14	1	40	MCA
1981	Standing Tall	59	29	2	47	MCA
1984	Ghetto Blaster	79	20	3	46	MCA
1986	The Good and the Bad Times	—	49	2	—	MCA
1988	Life in the Modern World	—	—	13	—	MCA
1991	Healing the Wounds	174	—	1	—	GRP
2003	Rural Renewal	—	73	2	—	P.R.A./Verve
"—" denotes releases that did not chart or were not released in that territory.

== Live albums ==
Year	Title	Chart positions			Label
Year	Title	US Pop	US R&B	US Jazz	Label
1962	The Jazz Crusaders at the Lighthouse	—	—	—	Pacific Jazz
1966	Live at the Lighthouse '66	—	—	—	Pacific Jazz
1968	Lighthouse '68	—	30	6	Pacific Jazz
1968	The Festival Album	—	—	—	Pacific Jazz
1969	Lighthouse '69	—	—	10	Pacific Jazz
1974	Scratch	73	16	4	Pacific Jazz
1980	Live Sides	—	—	—	Pacific Jazz
1981	Ongaku Kai - Live in Japan	—	—	—	Pacific Jazz
1982	Royal Jam	144	30	5	Pacific Jazz
1993	Live In Japan	—	—	24	Pacific Jazz
2000	Power of Our Music - The Endangered Species	—	—	—	Pacific Jazz
2004	Live in Japan 2003	—	—	—	P.R.A.
2006	Alive in South Africa (reissue)	—	—	—	True Life Jazz

== Compilations as The Crusaders ==
Year	Title	Chart positions			Label
Year	Title	US Pop	US R&B	US Jazz	Label
1973	At Their Best	—	19	17	Motown
1976	The Best of the Crusaders	122	41	18	ABC/Blue Thumb
1987	The Vocal Album	—	—	—	MCA
1988	Sample a Decade	—	—	—	Connoisseur
1990	16 Original World Hits	—	—	—	MCA
1992	The Golden Years	—	—	—	GRP
1994	Best of Best	—	—	—	MCA
1994	And Beyond...	—	—	—	Music Collection
1994	Best	—	—	—	Pickwick
1995	The Ultimate Compilation	—	—	—	Nectar
1995	The Greatest Crusade	—	—	—	Calibre
1995	The Ultimate	—	—	—	Castle
1995	Soul Shadows	—	—	—	Connoisseur
1996	The Best of the Crusaders	—	—	—	MCA
1996	Way Back Home	—	—	—	Blue Thumb
1998	Priceless Jazz Collection	—	—	—	GRP
2000	The Crusaders' Finest Hour	—	—	—	Verve
2003	Groove Crusade	—	—	—	Blue Thumb
2007	Gold	—	—	—	Hip-O/Verve
"—" denotes releases that did not chart or were not released in that territory.

== Singles as The Nite Hawks ==
Year	Title (A-side / B-side)	Album	Label
1959	"Chicken Grabber / Big Top"	(Single only)	Del-Fi

== Singles as The Night Hawks ==
Year	Title (A-side / B-side)	Album	Label
1961	"Bunny Ride / Sweetie Lester"	(Single only)	Pacific Jazz

== Singles as The Jazz Crusaders ==
Year	Title	Chart positions	Label	Album
Year	Title	US Pop	Label	Album
1962	"Tonight / Sinnin' Sam"	—	Pacific Jazz	Lookin' Ahead
1962	"The Young Rabbits / Song of India"	—	Pacific Jazz	Lookin' Ahead
1962	"Congolese Sermon / Weather Beat"	—	Pacific Jazz	(Single only)
1963	"No Name Samba / Tough Talk"	—	World Pacific	Tough Talk
1963	"Turkish Black/Boopie"	—	World Pacific	Tough Talk
1963	"Spanish Castles / Bluesette"	—	World Pacific	Jazz Waltz (with Les McCann)
1964	"On Broadway / Heat Wave"	—	World Pacific	Heat Wave
1964	"I Remember Tomorrow / Long John"	—	World Pacific	Stretchin' Out
1965	"Tough Talk / The Thing"	—	World Pacific	The Thing
1965	"Aqua Dulce / Soul Bourgeoisie"	—	World Pacific	Chile Con Soul
1966	"Uptight (Everything's Alright) / Scratch"	95	Pacific Jazz	Talk That Talk
1968	"Ooga-Boo-Ga-Loo / Eleanor Rigby"	—	Pacific Jazz	Lighthouse '68
1968	"Love and Peace / Hey Jude"	—	Pacific Jazz	Powerhouse
1969	"Get Back / Willie and Laura Mae Jones"	—	Pacific Jazz	Lighthouse '69
1970	"Way Back Home / Jackson"	90	Chisa	Old Socks New Shoes – New Socks Old Shoes
"—" denotes releases that did not chart.

== Singles as The Crusaders ==
Year	Title (A-side / B-side)	Chart positions			Label	Album
Year	Title (A-side / B-side)	US Pop	US R&B	UK	Label	Album
1971	"Pass the Plate / Greasy Spoon"	—	—	—	Chisa	Pass the Plate
1972	"Spanish Harlem / Papa Hooper's Barrelhouse Groove"	—	—	—	MoWest	Hollywood
1972	"Put It Where You Want It / Mosadi (Woman)"	52	39	—	Blue Thumb	Crusaders 1
1972	"So Far Away / That's How I Feel"	—	—	—	Blue Thumb	Crusaders 1
1973	"Don't Let It Get You Down / Journey from Within"	86	31	—	Blue Thumb	Second Crusade
1973	"That's How I Feel / Take It or Leave It"	—	—	—	Blue Thumb	Crusaders 1
1974	"Lay It on the Line / Let's Boogie"	—	—	—	Blue Thumb	Unsung Heroes
1974	"Scratch / Way Back Home"	81	70	—	Blue Thumb	Scratch
1974	"Stomp and Buck Dance / A Ballad for Joe (Louis)"	—	41	—	ABC/Blue Thumb	Southern Comfort
1975	"Creole / I Felt the Love"	—	84	—	ABC/Blue Thumb	Chain Reaction
1976	"Keep That Same Old Feeling / Til' the Sun Shines"	—	21	—	ABC/Blue Thumb	Those Southern Knights
1976	"And Then There Was the Blues / Feeling Funky"	—	92	—	ABC/Blue Thumb	Those Southern Knights
1977	"Feel It / The Way We Was"	—	63	—	ABC/Blue Thumb	Free as the Wind
1977	"Free as the Wind / The Way We Was"	—	84	—	ABC/Blue Thumb	Free as the Wind
1978	"Bajou Bottoms / Covert Action"	—	93	—	ABC/Blue Thumb	Images
1979	"Street Life / The Hustler"	36	17	5	MCA	Street Life
1980	"Soul Shadows / Sweet Gentle Love"	—	41	—	MCA	Rhapsody and Blues
1981	"I'm So Glad I'm Standing Here Today / Standing Tall"	97	67	61	MCA	Standing Tall
1981	"This Old World's Too Funky for Me / Standing Tall"	—	—	—	MCA	Standing Tall
1984	"New Moves / Ghetto Blaster"	—	27	—	MCA	Ghetto Blaster
1984	"Dead End / Dream Street"	—	57	—	MCA	Ghetto Blaster
1984	"Gotta Lotta Shakalada / Zalal'e Mini (Take It Easy)"	—	—	—	MCA	Ghetto Blaster
1984	"Night Ladies / Megastreet"	—	—	55	MCA	Ghetto Blaster
1986	"The Way It Goes / Good Times"	—	—	—	MCA	The Good and Bad Times
1988	"A.C. (Alternating Currents) / Mullholland Nights"	—	—	—	MCA	Life in the Modern World
"—" denotes releases that did not chart or were not released in that territory.
