= Crusaders 1 =

Studio album by The Crusaders
- Released: 1972
- Studios: Wally Heider Studios, Hollywood, California; Wally Heider Studios, Los Angeles, California
- Genres: Jazz; jazz fusion
- Length: 1:18:44
- Label: Blue Thumb
- Producer: Stewart Levine

The Crusaders chronology
Hollywood (1972)	Crusaders 1 (1972)	The 2nd Crusade (1973)

Singles from Crusaders 1
- 1. "Put It Where You Want It / Mosadi (Woman)" Released: 1972; 2. "So Far Away / That's How I Feel" Released: 1972

Crusaders 1 is a studio album by The Crusaders, released in 1972 on Blue Thumb Records. This album peaked at No. 3 on the US Billboard Top Jazz LPs, No. 29 on the US Billboard Top Soul LPs and at No. 96 on the Billboard Top LPs chart.

== Critical reception ==
Professional ratings
Review scores
Source	Rating
AllMusic	5/5 stars

AllMusic's Thom Jurek, in a 5/5-star review, exclaimed "In 1971, the Jazz Crusaders reinvented themselves for the first time. First they dropped the word "jazz" from their moniker, and secondly they wholeheartedly embraced electric bass and guitars in their mix. Their new "debut" is a wonder of jazz-funk as a natural evolution out of hard bop and soul-jazz... The Crusaders were onto something here and set themselves a new watermark, carving out a place for themselves in the new decade, and it turns out for posterity."

== Accolades ==
Crusaders 1 earned a Grammy nomination in the category of Best R&B Instrumental Performance.

== Track listing ==
Adapted from album's text.

No.	Title	Writer(s)	Length
1.	"That's How You Feel"	Joe Sample	8:20
2.	"So Far Away"	Carole King	11:50
3.	"Put It Where You Want It"	Joe Sample	5:30
4.	"Mystique Blues"	Wayne Henderson	4:44
5.	"Full Moon"	Wayne Henderson	7:20
6.	"Sweet Revival"	Joe Sample	4:50
7.	"Mud Hole"	Wayne Henderson	6:30
8.	"It's Just Gotta Be That Way"	Wayne Henderson	3:40
9.	"Georgia Cottonfield"	Joe Sample	7:02
10.	"A Shade of Blues"	Joe Sample	5:20
11.	"Three Children"	Wilton Felder	5:15
12.	"Mosadi (Woman)"	Wayne Henderson	7:15

== Credits ==
- Drums – Stix Hooper
- Electric Bass – Chuck Rainey
- Engineer – Rik Pekkonen
- Guitar – Arthur Adams, David T. Walker
- Keyboards – Joe Sample
- Producer – Stewart Levine
- Soloist, Guitar – Larry Carlton
- Tenor Saxophone, Electric Bass – Wilton Felder
- Trombone – Wayne Henderson
