= The Good and the Bad Times =

Studio album by The Crusaders
- Released: 1986
- Studio: Baby'O Recorders (Hollywood, California); Larrabee Sound Studios (North Hollywood, California); Sound Castle Recorders (Los Angeles, California)
- Genre: Jazz; jazz fusion
- Length: 40:10
- Label: MCA
- Producer: Wilton Felder; Joe Sample

The Crusaders chronology
Ghetto Blaster (1984)	The Good and the Bad Times (1986)	Life in the Modern World (1988)

The Good and the Bad Times is a studio album by The Crusaders, released in 1986 on MCA Records. This album peaked at No. 4 on the US Billboard Top Jazz LPs and No. 49 on the US Billboard Top Soul LPs chart.

== Critical reception ==
Professional ratings
Review scores
Source	Rating
AllMusic	2/5 stars

Richard S. Ginell of AllMusic, in a 2/5 star review, remarked "The departure of Stix Hooper from the Crusaders basically knocked the main prop out from underneath their interlocked groove, and no combination of drummers and percussionists could put the structure together again...And most telling of all, this does not sound like a Crusaders record; the rhythm aside, Sample's reliance on harsh-sounding synths deconstructs and desiccates their sound. Pass it by."

== Track listing ==
Adapted from album's text.

No.	Title	Writer(s)	Length
1.	"Good Times"	Joe Sample	6:59
2.	"The Way It Goes"	Will Jennings, Joe Sample	5:27
3.	"Sweet Dreams"	Joe Sample	7:40
4.	"Mischievous Ways"	Joe Sample	6:09
5.	"Sometimes You Can Take It Or Leave It"	Joe Sample	6:44
6.	"Three Wishes"	Joe Sample	7:02

== Credits ==
The Crusaders

- Joe Sample – acoustic piano, electronic keyboards
- Wilton Felder – saxophones

Guest musicians

- Dr. George Shaw – synthesizer programming (1, 2, 4–6)
- David Ervin – synthesizer programming (3)
- Dean Parks – guitars
- Larry Carlton – guitar solo (3)
- David T. Walker – guitar solo (3)
- Rick Zunigar – guitar solo (5, 6)
- Bradley Bobo – bass (4), bass solo (4)
- Sonny Emory – drums (1, 2, 4–6)
- Perry Wilson – drums (3)
- Lenny Castro – percussion (1, 2, 4–6)
- Paulinho da Costa – percussion (3)
- Joel Peskin – alto flute (2)
- Sal Marquez – trumpet solo (4, 6)
- Nancy Wilson – vocals (2)

=== Production ===
- Wilton Felder – producer
- Joe Sample – producer
- F. Byron Clark – mixing, engineer (1, 2, 4–6)
- Robert Biles – engineer (3)
- Mark DeSisto – assistant engineer (1, 2, 4–6)
- Barry Conley – assistant engineer (3)
- John Golden – mastering at K Disc Mastering (Hollywood, California)
- Ceferino "Sonny" Abelardo – production coordinator
- Pamela Hope Lobue – production coordinator
- Mark Devlin – art direction
- Visual Design – design
- Ernie Barnes – album artwork
