= Ghetto Blaster (The Crusaders album) =

Studio album by The Crusaders
- Released: 1984
- Studio: Devonshire Sound Studios (North Hollywood, California); Hollywood Sound Recorders (Hollywood, California); The Village Recorder, Studio Masters and Sound Castle Recorders (Los Angeles, California)
- Genre: Jazz; jazz fusion
- Length: 42:49
- Label: MCA
- Producer: Leon Ndugu Chancler; Wilton Felder; Joe Sample

The Crusaders chronology
Royal Jam (1982)	Ghetto Blaster (1984)	The Good and the Bad Times (1986)

Ghetto Blaster is a studio album by The Crusaders issued in 1983 on MCA Records. This album peaked at No. 3 on the US Billboard Top Jazz LPs, No. 20 on the US Billboard Top Soul LPs and No. 46 on the UK UK Pop Albums chart.

== Critical reception ==
Pam Lambert of the Wall Street Journal wrote that the Crusaders on sound fresher than most 'new' artists" and "the album features the Crusaders' typically eclectic mixture of styles." Liam Lacey of the Globe and Mail remarked "One of the oldest groups in recorded history, The Crusaders have survived since the 1950s by careful adaptations in their basic warm funk-jazz style."

=== Accolades ===
The album earned a Grammy nomination in the category of Best R&B Instrumental Performance.

== Track listing ==
Adapted from album's text.

No.	Title	Writer(s)	Length
1.	"Dead End"	Joe Sample	4:56
2.	"Gotta Lotta Shakalada"	Will Jennings, Joe Sample	3:54
3.	"New Moves"	Will Jennings, Joe Sample	4:16
4.	"Zalal'e Mini (Take It Easy)"	Wilton Felder, Caiphus Semenya	6:10
5.	"Night Ladies"	Leon Ndugu Chancler	7:07
6.	"Dream Street"	Wilton Felder, Joe Sample	4:21

== Credits ==
The Crusaders

- Joe Sample – acoustic piano, keyboards (Rhodes electric piano, Rhodes Chroma, Yamaha DX7, Yamaha GS1, Yamaha CE-20, Minimoog, Prophet-5, Prophet T8), string arrangements
- Wilton Felder – electric bass, saxophones
- Leon Ndugu Chancler – drums, LinnDrum

Guest musicians

- David Ervin – synthesizer programming
- Dean Gant – synthesizer programming
- Clark Spangler – synthesizer programming
- Jon Steinhoff – synthesizer programming
- Roland Bautista – guitars
- Cornell Dupree – guitars
- Charles Fearing – guitars
- Dean Parks – guitars
- David T. Walker – guitars
- Abraham Laboriel – bass
- Paulinho da Costa – percussion
- Chuck Findley – trumpet
- Nathan Kaproff – string contractor
- Paul Shure – concertmaster
- Gwen Evans – vocals (2, 3)
- Jessica Williams – vocals (2, 5)

=== Production ===
- Joe Sample – producer
- Leon Ndugu Chancler – producer
- Wilton Felder – producer
- F. Byron Clark – mixing, engineer (1–3, 5, 6)
- Terry Becker – engineer (4, 7)
- Craig Burbidge – additional recording (1–3, 5, 6)
- Paul Ericksen – assistant engineer (1–3, 5, 6), mix assistant (1–3, 5, 6)
- Clark Germain – assistant engineer (1–3, 5, 6), mix assistant (1–3, 5, 6)
- Jim Faraci – assistant engineer (4, 7)
- Clif Jones – assistant engineer (4, 7)
- Doug Williams – assistant engineer (4, 7)
- John Golden – mastering at K Disc Mastering (Hollywood, California)
- George Osaki – art direction
- Terry Veal – design
- Aaron Rapoport – photography
- Ernie Barnes – album artwork
