= Images (The Crusaders album) =

Studio album by The Crusaders
- Released: 1978
- Studio: Hollywood Sound Recorders (Hollywood, California)
- Genre: Jazz; jazz fusion
- Length: 37:14
- Label: ABC
- Producer: Wilton Felder; Stix Hooper; Joe Sample

The Crusaders chronology
Free as the Wind (1977)	Images (1978)	Street Life (1979)

Images is a studio album by The Crusaders issued in 1978 on ABC Records. The album earned a Grammy nomination in the category of Best R&B Instrumental Performance.

== Critical reception ==
Professional ratings
Review scores
Source	Rating
AllMusic	2.5/5 stars

Michael G. Nastos of AllMusic wrote "While this is far from the worst — or the very best — recording the Crusaders produced in their checkered career, it offers no extra tracks or fresh insight, and is essentially a mediocre effort."

== Track listing ==
No.	Title	Writer(s)	Length
1.	"Fairy Tales"	Joe Sample	4:42
2.	"Marcella's Dream"	"Stix" Hooper	6:52
3.	"Bayou Bottoms"	Wilton Felder	4:15
4.	"Merry-Go-Round"	Joe Sample	6:13
5.	"Cosmic Reign"	Robert "Pops" Popwell	8:08
6.	"Covert Action"	Wilton Felder	5:19
7.	"Snowflake"	Joe Sample	4:55

== Credits ==
The Crusaders

- Joe Sample – keyboards
- Billy Rogers – guitars
- Robert "Pops" Popwell – bass
- Stix Hooper – drums, percussion
- Wilton Felder – saxophones

Guest musicians

- Roland Bautista (1, 3, 6)
- Dean Parks
- Paulinho da Costa

=== Production ===
- Joe Sample – producer
- Stix Hooper – producer
- Wilton Felder – producer, mixing
- Rik Pekkonen – engineer, mixing
- Bernie Grundman – mastering at A&M Studios (Hollywood, California)
- Richard Germinaro – art direction, design concept
- Stuart Kusher – art direction, design concept
- Graham Henman – photography
- Larry DuPont – photography
- Vigon Nahas Vigon – lettering
