= Free as the Wind =

Studio album by The Crusaders
- Released: 1977
- Studio: Hollywood Sound Recorders (Hollywood, California)
- Genre: Jazz; jazz fusion
- Length: 42:49
- Label: ABC Records
- Producer: Stewart Levine; The Crusaders

The Crusaders chronology
Those Southern Knights (1976)	Free as the Wind (1977)	Images (1978)

Free as the Wind is a studio album by The Crusaders issued in 1977 on ABC Records. The album reached No. 8 on the Billboard Top Soul Albums chart.

== Critical reception ==
Professional ratings
Review scores
Source	Rating
AllMusic	5/5 stars

Richard S. Ginell of AllMusic, where it received five stars out of five, wrote "When the material is this good, everything falls into place from there; the grooves are deeper, the soloing by all five Crusaders is more melodic and probing, and while Sample provides a few brass and string arrangements, this is just harmless decoration, neither a necessity nor a hindrance. This would be the Crusaders' high-water mark in the post-Wayne Henderson years, and it can stand tall with anything they've done."

== Track listing ==
Adapted from album's text.

No.	Title	Writer(s)	Length
1.	"Free as the Wind"	Joe Sample	6:17
2.	"I Felt the Love"	Stix Hooper	5:10
3.	"The Way We Was"	Robert Popwell	5:24
4.	"Nite Crawler"	Larry Carlton	4:45
5.	"Feel It"	Stix Hooper, Lamont Dozier, Larry Carlton, Robert Popwell, Wilton Felder	4:15
6.	"Sweet N' Sour"	Joe Sample	8:57
7.	"River Rat"	Wilton Felder	2:29
8.	"It Happens Everyday"	Joe Sample	5:40

== Personnel ==
Adapted from album's text.

The Crusaders

- Joe Sample – keyboards, horn and string orchestrations
- Larry Carlton – guitars
- Robert "Pops" Popwell – bass
- Stix Hooper – drums, percussion
- Wilton Felder – saxophones

Guest musicians

- Dean Parks – guitars
- Roland Bautista – guitars (5, 7)
- Arthur Adams – guitars (8)
- Ralph MacDonald – special percussion
- Paulinho da Costa – percussion (5)

=== Production ===
- Stewart Levine – producer
- The Crusaders – associate producers
- Rik Pekkonen – engineer, mixing
- Bernie Grundman – mastering at A&M Studios (Hollywood, California)
- Frank Mulvey – art direction
- Tim Ritchie – album design
- Ed Simpson – photography

== Charts ==
Chart	Peak position
US Billboard Top LPs & Tape	41
US Top Soul LPs (Billboard)	9
