= Old Socks New Shoes – New Socks Old Shoes =

Studio album by The Jazz Crusaders
- Released: October 17, 1970
- Studio: Wally Heider Studio 3, Los Angeles, California
- Genre: Jazz; jazz fusion
- Length: 39:03
- Label: Chisa

The Jazz Crusaders chronology
Give Peace a Chance (1970)	Old Socks New Shoes – New Socks Old Shoes (1970)	Pass the Plate (1971)

Old Socks New Shoes – New Socks Old Shoes is a studio album by jazz fusion group The Jazz Crusaders, released in October 1970 via Chisa Records. The album peaked at No. 12 on the US Billboard Top Soul LPs chart and No. 6 on the US Billboard Top Jazz LPs chart.

== Critical reception ==
Professional ratings
Review scores
Source	Rating
AllMusic	3.5/5 stars

Thom Jurek of AllMusic, in a 3.5/5-star review, remarked, "Old Socks, New Shoes...New Socks, Old Shoes was the final album by the Jazz Crusaders. Immediately thereafter they dropped the word "jazz" from their name, leaving them the Crusaders and most of the rest is history...While the Jazz Crusaders had long made then-current popular songs part of their repertoire, and had moved from their hard bop origins into the soul-jazz groove years before, this disc was a shock, and sounded like a different band -- almost...Despite the fact that many serious jazzheads see this as the beginning of the creative end for the Crusaders, they are just plain wrong. This is the start of a new beginning, one that would roll on through most of the '70s and bring the group its greatest commercial and radio successes and makes them such an excellent source of inspiration and samples for hip-hop and dance music producers for another couple of generations. This is an absolute classic."

== Tracklisting ==
No.	Title	Writer(s)	Length
1.	"Thank You Fallettinme Be Mice Elf Again"	Slyvester Stewart	5:32
2.	"Funny Shuffle"	Wayne Henderson	4:04
3.	"Why Do You Laugh at Me?"	Wayne Henderson	2:35
4.	"Jackson!"	Wayne Henderson	2:44
5.	"Rainy Night in Georgia"	Tony Joe White	4:13
6.	"Golden Slumbers"	John Lennon/Paul McCartney	4:07
7.	"Jazz!"	Joe Sample	4:16
8.	"Time Has No Ending"	Wayne Henderson	4:27
9.	"Hard Times"	Paul Mitchell, David "Fathead" Newman	3:01
10.	"Way Back Home"	Wilton Felder	4:02
