= The 2nd Crusade =

Studio album by The Crusaders
- Released: 1973
- Studio: Wally Heider Studios (Hollywood, California)
- Genre: Jazz; jazz fusion
- Length: 1:12:05
- Label: Blue Thumb
- Producer: The Crusaders

The Crusaders chronology
Hollywood (1972)	The 2nd Crusade (1973)	Unsung Heroes (1973)

The 2nd Crusade is a studio album by The Crusaders, released in 1972 on Blue Thumb Records. The album peaked at No. 1 on the US Billboard Top Jazz LPs and No. 4 on the US Billboard Top Soul LPs chart and No. 45 on the US Billboard Top LPs and Tape.

== Critical reception ==
Professional ratings
Review scores
Source	Rating
AllMusic	4/5 stars

AllMusic's Thom Jurek, in a 4.5/5 star review, exclaimed "Given the critical and commercial success of 1 and their rebirth as the "Crusaders," the band decided to follow up the previous LP's double length with another one! There are 13 tunes here, all extrapolating the band's previously held notions of soul-jazz and hard bop as they emerged into the new funky '70s...or the most part, the tunes are shorter here and rely far more heavily on groove aesthetics rather than jazz syncopations... But make no mistake: this is a jazz record with greasy funk at its core, not a jazzy funk record."

== Accolades ==
The 2nd Crusade earned a Grammy nomination in the category of Best R&B Instrumental Performance.

== Track listing ==
Adapted from album's text.

No.	Title	Writer(s)	Length
1.	"Don't Let It Get You Down"	Joe Sample	3:00
2.	"Take It Or Leave It"	Wayne Henderson	3:40
3.	"Gotta Get It On"	Nesbert "Stix" Hooper	2:50
4.	"Where There's A Will There's A Way"	Wayne Henderson	5:30
5.	"Look Beyond The Hill"	Wilton Felder	3:20
6.	"Journey From Within"	Nesbert "Stix" Hooper	4:51
7.	"Ain't Gon' Change A Thang"	Wilton Felder	4:30
8.	"A Message From The Inner City"	Joe Sample	8:50
9.	"A Search For Soul"	Joe Sample	9:50
10.	"No Place To Hide"	Wayne Henderson	8:44
11.	"Tomorrow Where Are You?"	Wilton Felder	5:10
12.	"Tough Talk"	Nesbert "Stix" Hooper, Joe Sample, Wayne Henderson	6:00
13.	"Do You Remember When??"	Joe Sample	6:00

== Credits ==
The Crusaders

- Joe Sample – keyboards
- Wilton Felder – electric bass, bass marimba, saxophones
- Nesbert "Stix" Hooper – percussion, effects
- Wayne Henderson – trombone

With:

- Arthur Adams – guitars
- Larry Carlton – guitars
- David T. Walker – guitars

=== Production ===
- The Crusaders – producers
- Stewart Levine – director
- Rik Pekkonen – engineer
- Barry Feinstein – design, photography
- Vicki Hodgetts – design, photography
