= Street Life (The Crusaders song) =

1979 single by the Crusaders

- UK single cover

Single by The Crusaders

from the album Street Life
- B-side: "The Hustler"
- Released: July 1979 (US); August 1979 (UK)
- Genre: Jazz-funk
- Length: 3:58 (single version); 7:50 (US disco mix); 11:18 (album version)
- Label: MCA
- Songwriters: Joe Sample; Will Jennings
- Producers: Wilton Felder; Stix Hooper; Joe Sample

The Crusaders singles chronology
| "Bayou Bottoms" (1978) | "Street Life" (1979) | "Soul Shadows" (1980) |

Music video
- "Street Life” on YouTube

"Street Life" is a song by American jazz band the Crusaders, released in 1979 by MCA Records as a single from the album of the same name. The lead vocals were performed by Randy Crawford. The song was a hit in the US, reaching number 36 on the Billboard Hot 100, and in Europe, where it peaked at number 5 on the UK Singles Chart. A modified version of the song was featured in the films Sharky's Machine and Jackie Brown, while the original appeared in the television program Better Call Saul and in the enhanced versions of the 2013 game Grand Theft Auto V on the in-game radio station, WorldWide FM.

== Background ==
The inspiration for the song came from the beginner's ski slope at Mammoth Mountain in California. Joe Sample said he "'saw people falling, running into each other... it was absolute chaos. It looked like a boulevard of madness.' And I said, 'That's what street life is.'" Sample teamed up with lyricist Will Jennings, who said that "the lyric, all that came right off of Hollywood Boulevard".

Sample first met Crawford when he played on her debut album Everything Must Change in 1976. After having good reviews about her song, but not being commercially successful, Crawford was then asked by Sample to sing the vocals for the song. As a result of this, the Crusaders produced her fourth album Now We May Begin, which became very successful.

Jazz reviewer Scott Yanow wrote "Although the Crusaders could not have known it at the time, their recording of 'Street Life'... was a last hurrah for the 20-year old group. Their recordings of the next few years would decline in interest until the band gradually faded away in the ’80s." Whereas, for Crawford, this song brought her recognition and effectively marked the beginning of her career.

== Track listings ==
7"

1. "Street Life" – 3:58
2. "The Hustler" – 3:50

12"

1. "Street Life" (Special Full Length US Disco Mix) – 7:50
2. "The Hustler" – 5:25

12" US promo

1. "Street Life" – 6:02
2. "Street Life" – 6:02

== Charts ==
| Chart (1979) | Peak position |
|---|---|
| Australia (Kent Music Report) | 79 |
| Belgium (Ultratop 50 Flanders) | 25 |
| Ireland (IRMA) | 14 |
| Netherlands (Dutch Top 40) | 13 |
| Netherlands (Single Top 100) | 20 |
| Norway (VG-lista) | 6 |
| Sweden (Sverigetopplistan) | 8 |
| UK Singles (Official Charts) | 5 |
| US Billboard Hot 100 | 36 |
| US Dance Club Songs (Billboard) | 75 |
| US Hot R&B/Hip-Hop Songs (Billboard) | 17 |

== Other recordings and samples ==
- In 1979, trumpeter Herb Alpert released a cover of the song from his album Rise. It peaked at number 4 on the Billboard Bubbling Under Hot 100 chart, number 41 on the Adult Contemporary chart, number 64 on the Hot Soul Singles chart and number 9 on the Canadian Adult Oriented Playlist chart.
- In 1981, Randy Crawford re-recorded a solo version of the track for the Burt Reynolds film Sharky's Machine. This version also featured prominently on the soundtrack to the 1997 Quentin Tarantino film Jackie Brown.
- In 1982, the Crusaders released a version of the song featuring B.B. King and the Royal Philharmonic Orchestra. The single was a shortened version from the live album Royal Jam. It was nominated for the Grammy Award for Best R&B Performance by a Duo or Group with Vocal in 1982.
- In 1997, Swedish rapper Swingfly sampled the song in "Street Life", which reached number 46 on the Swedish charts.
- In 1998, the song was sampled in "Beautiful" by Mary J. Blige for the soundtrack album How Stella Got Her Groove Back. The song peaked at number 72 on the Hot R&B/Hip-Hop Songs chart.
