= Standing Tall (The Crusaders album) =

Studio album by the Crusaders
- Released: October 1981
- Studios: Music City Music Hall (Nashville, Tennessee); Paramount, Producers Workshop, and Wally Heider (Hollywood, California); Salty Dog (Van Nuys, California); Yamaha (Glendale, California)
- Genre: Jazz
- Length: 37:23
- Label: MCA
- Producers: Wilton Felder; Stix Hooper; Joe Sample

The Crusaders chronology
Rhapsody and Blues (1980)	Standing Tall (1981)	Royal Jam (1982)

Professional ratings
Review scores
Source	Rating
AllMusic	1.5/5 stars
The Rolling Stone Jazz Record Guide	2/5 stars

Standing Tall is an album by the jazz group the Crusaders, their third studio album with MCA Records. It features singer Joe Cocker as guest artist on two tracks: the 1981 Grammy-nominated song "I'm So Glad I'm Standing Here Today" and "This Old World's Too Funky for Me".

== Track listing ==
1. "Standing Tall" (Stix Hooper) - 6:46
2. "I'm So Glad I'm Standing Here Today" (Joe Sample, Will Jennings) - 5:02
3. "Sunshine in Your Eyes" (Sample) - 6:11
4. "This Old World's Too Funky for Me" (Sample, Jennings) - 5:25
5. "Luckenbach, Texas (Back to the Basics of Love)" (Chips Moman, Bobby Emmons) - 4:23
6. "The Longest Night" (Sample) - 6:24
7. "Reprise (I'm So Glad I'm Standing Here Today) (Instrumental)" (Sample. Jennings) - 2:59

== Personnel ==
The Crusaders

- Joe Sample – acoustic, electric and synthesizer keyboards; horn and string arrangements
- Wilton Felder – saxophones, electric bass (5)
- Stix Hooper – drums, percussion

With:

- Barry Finnerty – guitar solos
- David T. Walker – guitars

Guest musicians

- Billy Preston – organ
- Larry Carlton – guitars
- Steve Gibson – guitars
- Jon Goin – guitars
- Dean Parks – guitars
- Reggie Young – guitars
- Marcus Miller – bass (1–3, 6, 7)
- Louis Johnson – bass (4)
- Paulinho da Costa – special percussion

Vocalists

- Joe Cocker – vocals (2, 4)
- Stephanie Spruill – backing vocals
- Julia Tillman Waters – backing vocals
- Maxine Waters Willard – backing vocals

Production

- Wilton Felder – producer
- Stix Hooper – producer
- Joe Sample – producer
- Bill Harris – engineer
- Galen Senogles – engineer, mixing
- Russell Castillo – assistant engineer
- David Debusk – assistant engineer
- Mike Reese – mastering at The Mastering Lab (Hollywood, California)
- Tom Hooper – executive assistant
- Robin Howell – production coordinator
- Wes Leathers – equipment coordinator
- John Malta – equipment coordinator
- George Osaki – art direction
- Georgopoulos/Imada Design, Inc. – design
- Alan Messer – photography
