= Jazz Waltz =

Jazz Waltz may refer to:

- a syncopated waltz in 3/4 time
- Jazz Waltz (Shorty Rogers album), 1963
- Jazz Waltz (Les McCann & The Jazz Crusaders album), 1963

Jazz Waltz refers to a syncopated waltz-rhythm song, it can be in either 3/4 or 6/8. Many use common motives and figures, which make it a coherent genre, very inventive. They are usually played in a bright tempo and evoke a sunny disposition. It may have been invented by Dave Brubeck and his group. The melody often begins with a pattern of eighth-note followed by a quarter-note which is repeated. That is followed by a bar of three quarter-notes, and both bars may be repeated before the theme is developed further. That is a signature of the genre. Examples include The Mood I'm In by composer Pete King, and Haven't We Met, by Kenny Rankin.
