= The Heart and Soul of Joe Williams and George Shearing =

Studio album by Joe Williams and George Shearing
- Released: 1971
- Recorded: March 1–2, 1971 at M.R.I. Studios, Hollywood, Los Angeles
- Genre: Jazz
- Label: Sheba ST102

Joe Williams chronology
| Worth Waiting For... (1970) | The Heart and Soul of Joe Williams and George Shearing (1971) | With Love (1973) |

George Shearing chronology
| Out of This World (1971) | The Heart and Soul of Joe Williams and George Shearing (1971) | As Requested (1972) |

The Heart and Soul of Joe Williams and George Shearing is a 1971 album by jazz pianist George Shearing and singer Joe Williams. The album was released on Shearing's own record label, Sheba Records. All the songs on the album have the words "heart" or "soul" in their titles.

== Reception ==
Professional ratings
Review scores
| Source | Rating |
|---|---|
| Allmusic | 4/5 stars |

C. Michael Bailey reviewed the album's 2001 reissue for All About Jazz and wrote that "Hitting the streets in 1971, The Heart and Soul... has been a bit hard to find as of late but has now been restored to its previous glory. ...Most striking is getting to hear Joe Williams outside of a blues context. He was a fine ballad and torch singer. "Heart and Soul" absolutely swings while "My Foolish Heart" has a bit of Latin whimsy. "Blues in My Heart" captures Williams in his most familiar territory. Shearing's accompaniment is tasteful (could it be anyway else?)".

Ken Dryden reviewed the album for Allmusic and wrote that Shearing and Williams "...work very well together due to their love of great melodies and their ability to build upon them" and particularly praised "My Heart Stood Still" writing that "the enchanting duo rendition by Williams and Shearing not only restores the often omitted verse but proves that less can be more" and that "The lesser-known tunes are hardly lesser quality. Jimmy van Heusen and Johnny Burke penned the gorgeous yet unjustly forgotten "Humpty Dumpty Heart," while Alec Wilder's "Sleep My Heart" is another long lost treasure".

== Track listing ==
1. "Heart and Soul" (Hoagy Carmichael, Frank Loesser) – 3:11
2. "Nobody's Heart" (Richard Rodgers, Lorenz Hart) – 2:22
3. "Body and Soul" (Frank Eyton, Johnny Green, Edward Heyman, Robert Sour) – 2:24
4. "Humpty Dumpty Heart" (Johnny Burke, Jimmy Van Heusen) – 2:33
5. "My Heart Stood Still" (Rodgers, Hart) – 2:09
6. "My Heart and I" (Frederick Hollander, Leo Robin) – 2:56
7. "Blues in My Heart" (Benny Carter, Irving Mills) – 3:20
8. "Sleep My Heart" (William Engvick, Alec Wilder) – 2:11
9. "My Foolish Heart" (Ned Washington, Victor Young) – 2:49
10. "My Heart Tells Me" (Mack Gordon, Harry Warren) – 2:02
11. "Young at Heart" (Carolyn Leigh, Johnny Richards) – 2:05
12. "I Let a Song Go Out of My Heart" (Duke Ellington, Irving Mills, Henry Nemo, John Redmond) – 3:11

== Personnel ==
- Joe Williams – vocals
- George Shearing – piano
- Andy Simpkins – double bass
- Stix Hooper – drums
- Gary Ulmer – engineer
- Beatrice Bayes Shearing – producer
