= Pass the Plate (album) =

Studio album by The Crusaders
- Released: May 1971
- Studio: Wally Heider Studio 3, Los Angeles, California
- Genre: Jazz; jazz fusion
- Length: 42:13
- Label: Chisa

The Crusaders chronology
| Old Socks New Shoes – New Socks Old Shoes (1970) | Pass the Plate (1971) | Hollywood (1972) |

Pass the Plate is a studio album by American jazz fusion group The Crusaders, released in May 1971 via Chisa Records. The album peaked at No. 12 on the US Billboard Top Jazz LPs chart, and No. 96 on the Billboard Top LPs chart.

== Critical reception ==
Professional ratings
Review scores
| Source | Rating |
|---|---|
| AllMusic | 4/5 stars |

Thom Jurek of AllMusic, in a 3.5/5-star review, exclaimed, "After 1970's Old Socks New Shoes – New Socks Old Shoes landed them a spot on the charts briefly for the single "Hard Times" the Crusaders decided on an entirely new approach by making a very small change: they dropped the word "Jazz" from their moniker for 1971's Pass the Plate, the group's final offering on Chisa. Pass the Plate is notable for many things...Ultimately, like its predecessor, this is arguably the Crusaders at their finest and most accessible to rock and pop audiences of the time, though they didn't give up an inch of the jazz cred they'd established over the previous decade."

== Track listing ==
| No. | Title | Writer(s) | Length |
|---|---|---|---|
| 1. | "Pass the Plate: Tap N' Shuffle/Sing for Your Keep/Beggin'/Haggin' Stomp" | | 15:42 |
| 2. | "Young Rabbits--'71-'72" | | 4:54 |
| 3. | "Listen and You'll See" | Joe Sample | 5:29 |
| 4. | "Greasy Spoon" | | 4:06 |
| 5. | "Treat Me Like Ya Treat Yaself" | Joe Sample | 2:34 |
| 6. | "Goin' Down South" | Joe Sample | 5:23 |
| 7. | "Love Can't Grow Where the Rain Won't Fall" | Joe Sample | 4:05 |

== Charts ==
| Chart (1971) | Peak position |
|---|---|
| US Billboard Top LPs | 96 |
| US Top Jazz LPs | 12 |
