= Southern Comfort (The Crusaders album) =

Studio album by the Crusaders
- Released: October 1974
- Recorded: 1974
- Studio: Wally Heider (Hollywood, California)
- Genre: Jazz fusion
- Length: 63:25
- Label: ABC/Blue Thumb
- Producer: Stewart Levine; the Crusaders

The Crusaders chronology
Scratch (1974)	Southern Comfort (1974)	Chain Reaction (1975)

Southern Comfort is a 1974 album by jazz fusion band the Crusaders.

== Reception ==
Professional ratings
Review scores
Source	Rating
AllMusic	3/5 stars
The Penguin Guide to Jazz Recordings	3.5/4 stars
The Rolling Stone Jazz Record Guide	3/5 stars

The AllMusic reviewer Jason Elias wrote: "A good representation of the Crusaders' tasteful and intelligent playing, Southern Comfort is more than recommended to their fans."

== Track listing ==
1. "Stomp and Buck Dance" (Wayne Henderson) - 5:51
2. "Greasy Spoon" (Stix Hooper) - 3:14
3. "Get on the Soul Ship" (Joe Sample) - 3:23
4. "Super Stuff" (Henderson) - 2:42
5. "Double Bubble" (Sample) - 2:44
6. "The Well's Gone Dry" (Larry Carlton) - 4:46
7. "Southern Comfort" (Henderson) - 2:07
8. "Time Bomb" (Sample) - 6:40
9. "When There's Love Around" (Hooper) - 5:28
10. "Lilies of the Nile" (Wilton Felder) - 9:35
11. "Whispering Pines" (Henderson) - 9:00
12. "A Ballad for Joe (Louis)" (Sample) - 7:29

== Personnel ==
The Crusaders

- Wayne Henderson – trombone
- Wilton Felder – tenor saxophone
- Joe Sample – keyboards
- Stix Hooper – drums
- Larry Carlton – guitars

Production

- The Crusaders – producers
- Stewart Levine – producer
- Rik Pekkonen – engineer, remix engineer
- Peter Granet – engineer
- Pacific Eye & Ear – art direction, design, concept
- Saint-Jivago Desanges – photography
- LA Legion – photography
- Gary Sloan – inside portrait photography

== Charts ==
Chart (1974–75)	Peak position
US Top LPs & Tape	31
US Soul LPs	3
US Jazz LPs	1

=== Singles ===
Year	Single	Chart positions	
Year	Single	US R&B	US Dance
1975	"Stomp and Buck Dance"	41	12
