= Those Southern Knights =

Studio album by the Crusaders
- Released: 1976
- Recorded: 1975
- Studio: Total Experience (Hollywood, California)
- Genre: Jazz fusion
- Length: 39:17
- Label: ABC
- Producer: Stewart Levine; The Crusaders

The Crusaders chronology
Chain Reaction (1975)	Those Southern Knights (1976)	Free as the Wind (1977)

Singles from Those Southern Knights
- 1. "Keep That Same Old Feeling" Released: 1976; 2. "And Then There Was the Blues" Released: 1976

Professional ratings
Review scores
Source	Rating
AllMusic	3/5 stars
The Penguin Guide to Jazz Recordings	3.5/4 stars
The Rolling Stone Jazz Record Guide	2/5 stars

Those Southern Knights is a 1976 studio album by the Crusaders. It peaked at number 38 on the Billboard Top LPs chart, as well as number 9 on the Soul LPs chart and number 2 on the Top Jazz LPs chart.

It includes "Keep That Same Old Feeling" and "And Then There Was the Blues". The former peaked at number 21 on the Hot Soul Singles chart, while the latter peaked at number 92.

== Track listing ==
No.	Title	Writer(s)	Length
1.	"Spiral"	Joe Sample	6:10
2.	"Keep That Same Old Feeling"	Wayne Henderson	5:34
3.	"My Mama Told Me So"	Sample	4:47
4.	"Til' the Sun Shines"	Larry Carlton	2:44
5.	"And Then There Was the Blues"	Nesbert "Stix" Hooper	9:36
6.	"Serenity"	Wilton Felder	7:12
7.	"Feeling Funky"	Robert "Pops" Popwell	3:01

== Personnel ==
Credits adapted from liner notes.

The Crusaders

- Wayne Henderson – trombone, vocals
- Wilton Felder – tenor saxophone, vocals
- Joe Sample – keyboards, vocals
- Stix Hooper – drums, percussion, vocals
- Larry Carlton – guitars, vocals
- Robert "Pops" Popwell – bass, vocals

Additional musicians

- Arthur Adams – guitars

Production

- Stewart Levine – producer
- The Crusaders – associate producers
- F. Byron Clark – recording, remix engineer
- Bernie Grundman – mastering
- Tom Wilkes – art direction
- Ethan Russell – photography

== Charts ==
Chart	Peak position
US Billboard Top LPs & Tape	38
US Top Soul LPs (Billboard)	9
US Top Jazz LPs (Billboard)	2
