= Royal Jam =

Live album by The Crusaders with B.B. King and the Royal Philharmonic Orchestra
- Released: 1982
- Recorded: September 1981
- Genre: Jazz, blues
- Label: GRP Records
- Producer: Joe Sample, Wilton Felder, Stix Hooper

The Crusaders chronology
Standing Tall (1981)	Royal Jam (1982)

Professional ratings
Review scores
Source	Rating
Allmusic	4/5 stars
The Rolling Stone Jazz Record Guide	2/5 stars

Royal Jam is a live recording by the jazz-funk band The Crusaders with B.B. King, Josie James and the Royal Philharmonic Orchestra. The album was recorded at London's Royal Festival Hall.

== Critical reception ==
Richard S. Ginell of Allmusic claimed "Around this time in their heyday, the Crusaders were experimenting with orchestral/jazz fusions in concert -- and MCA thought enough of them to capture the music in London's Royal Festival Hall one fine summer...it's one of the band's most enjoyable albums of that period."

== Track listing ==
All songs written by Joe Sample and Will Jennings except as noted.

1. "Overture (I’m So Glad I’m Standing Here Today)" – 5:51
2. "One Day I’ll Fly Away" – 5:49
3. "Fly with Wings of Love" (Joe Sample) – 9:49
4. "Burnin’ Up the Carnival" – 5:44
5. "Last Call" (Sample) – 7:59
6. "The Thrill Is Gone" (Roy Hawkins, Rick Darnell) – 5:26
7. "Better Not Look Down" – 6:22
8. "Hold On" – 4:23
9. "Street Life" – 7:56
10. "I Just Can’t Leave Your Love Alone" – 4:15
11. "Never Make a Move Too Soon" (Stix Hooper, Will Jennings) – 4:12

== Personnel ==
The Crusaders

- Wilton Felder – saxophones
- Joe Sample – keyboards, arrangements & orchestration
- Stix Hooper – drums, percussion

Guest artists

- B.B. King – vocals, guitar
- Josie James – vocals (on "Burnin' Up The Carnival" and "Street Life")
- Members of the Royal Philharmonic Orchestra – Conductor: Sidney Reginald Garris

Guest musicians

- Barry Finnerty, David T. Walker – guitar
- James Jamerson Jr. – bass
- Efraim Logreira – special percussion
- Galen Senogles – mixing
