= Terry Bradds =

American guitarist (born 1946)

Terry Lee Bradds (born February 21, 1946) is an American guitarist who was born in Jamestown, Ohio and attended Greeneview High School.

== Career ==
Bradds has been playing guitar since the age of five. He has performed with a wide variety of musicians and entertainers worldwide, including Martha Raye, John Davidson, Peter Allen. He was a member of the Hi-Landers and The ThreeO, the latter of which was originally signed to Sun Records. He has played at clubs and venues such as the Copacabana, The Martinique, Playboy Club, and as well as many churches and colleges across the country. While with the Hi-Landers, the group was scheduled to be on The Tonight Show Starring Johnny Carson.

Bradds has been on staff of several T.V. shows, written several commercials, and written original music. His song "Jesus is the Rock" was the theme for the Ohio Teens for Christ.

Bradds now resides in Florida, where he teaches advanced guitar studies at Florida Christian College and is a Minister of worship and Music. He also frequently plays shows, recently playing an extended performance at SeaWorld in Kissimmee, Florida.

== Personal ==
Terry married Nancy Liming on January 30, 1965, who died in November 2014. He has two children, Craig and Chris, and five grandchildren. He is a cousin of former American Basketball star Gary Bradds. Bradds plays a Gibson ES-175.

== Partial discography ==
- Need You: The Hi-Landers - (1964)
- My Lifes Dreams: The ThreeO - (1968), - Clearhill Records
- HymnProv: Solo
- Smart Set: Stan Smart, Julie Smart
- Day by Day: Solo
- Sumner Sessions: Robert Popwell
- Master Hands: Robert Popwell

== See also ==
- Robert Popwell
- Copacabana (nightclub)
- Gary Bradds
