= Bullitt (Wilton Felder album) =

Studio album by Wilton Felder
- Released: 1969
- Recorded: 1969
- Genre: Jazz
- Label: Pacific Jazz; ST 20152
- Producer: Wayne Henderson

Wilton Felder chronology
Bullitt (1969)	We All Have a Star (1978)

Bullitt is the debut album by saxophonist Wilton Felder recorded in 1969 and released on the Pacific Jazz label.

== Reception ==
Professional ratings
Review scores
Source	Rating
AllMusic	2/5 stars

AllMusic rated the album with 2 stars.

== Track listing ==
1. "Theme from Bullitt" (Lalo Schifrin) – 3:20
2. "All Along the Watchtower" (Bob Dylan) – 3:20
3. "Ain't Nothing Like the Real Thing" (Nickolas Ashford, Valerie Simpson) – 3:10
4. "Hi-Heel Sneakers" (Robert Higginbotham) – 2:50
5. "The Split" (Quincy Jones) – 3:35
6. "Doing My Thing" (Wayne Henderson) – 4:30
7. "Up Here Down Below" (Wayne Henderson) – 3:11
8. "Please Return Your Love to Me" (Norman Whitfield, Barrett Strong) – 2:35
9. "With a Little Help from My Friends" (John Lennon, Paul McCartney) – 2:20
10. "It's Just a Game, Love" (Jones) – 2:40

== Personnel ==
- Wilton Felder – tenor saxophone, arranger
- Wayne Henderson – trombone, arranger
- Other unidentified musicians
