= Chain Reaction (The Crusaders album) =

Studio album by the Crusaders
- Released: 1975
- Recorded: 1975
- Studio: Wally Heider Studios (Hollywood, California)
- Genre: Jazz fusion
- Length: 40:32
- Label: ABC/Blue Thumb
- Producer: Stewart Levine; The Crusaders

The Crusaders chronology
Southern Comfort (1974)	Chain Reaction (1975)	Those Southern Knights (1976)

Chain Reaction is a 1975 album by jazz-fusion band the Crusaders.

== Reception ==
Professional ratings
Review scores
Source	Rating
AllMusic	4.5/5 stars
The Rolling Stone Jazz Record Guide	3/5 stars

The AllMusic review by Jim Newsom says the album "finds the Crusaders at the top of their form" and that it is "one of the tastiest concoctions of the mid-'70s jazz-fusion era". It concludes that Chain Reaction "helped lure young, rock and soul-oriented listeners over to check out the jazz side".

== Track listing ==
1. "Creole" – 3:25 (Felder)
2. "Chain Reaction" – 5:35 (Sample)
3. "I Felt the Love" – 2:28 (Hooper)
4. "Mellow Out" – 2:44 (Carlton)
5. "Rainbow Visions" – 6:15 (Henderson)
6. "Hallucinate" – 5:08 (Sample)
7. "Give It Up" – 2:56 (Sample)
8. "Hot's It" – 3:50 (Sample)
9. "Sugar Cane" – 2:31 (Henderson)
10. "Soul Caravan" – 5:30 (Hooper, Sample, Carlton, Henderson, Felder)

== Personnel ==
The Crusaders

- Joe Sample – keyboards, Fender Rhodes, clavinet, synthesizers
- Larry Carlton – guitars
- Wilton Felder – bass, saxophones
- Stix Hooper – drums, percussion
- Wayne Henderson – trombone, brass

=== Production ===
- The Crusaders – producers
- Stewart Levine – associate producer
- Rik Pekkonen – engineer
- The Mastering Lab (Hollywood, California) – mastering location
- Ed Scarisbrick – illustration
- Ron Slenzak – photography

== Charts ==
Chart (1975)	Peak position
Billboard 200	26
US Top R&B Albums	9
US Top Jazz Albums	1

=== Singles ===
Year	Single	Chart positions
Year	Single	US R&B
1975	"Creole"	84
