= Tough Talk =

Studio album by The Jazz Crusaders
- Released: 1963
- Recorded: February 13 & 19, 1963
- Studio: Pacific Jazz Studios, Hollywood, CA
- Genre: Jazz
- Label: Pacific Jazz; PJ 68
- Producer: Richard Bock

The Jazz Crusaders chronology
The Jazz Crusaders at the Lighthouse (1962)	Tough Talk (1963)	Heat Wave (1963)

Tough Talk is the fourth album by The Jazz Crusaders, recorded in 1963 and released on the Pacific Jazz label.

== Reception ==
Professional ratings
Review scores
Source	Rating
AllMusic	4/5 stars

AllMusic rated the album with 4 stars; in his review, Scott Yanow said: "In the 1960s the Jazz Crusaders managed to be both accessible and creative, funky and swinging, traditional (with the influence of R&B and gospel) yet modern; no wonder the group was so popular in the jazz world".

== Track listing ==
1. "Deacon Brown" (Wilton Felder) - 3:40
2. "Turkish Black" (Felder) - 5:34
3. "Brahms' Lullaby" (Johannes Brahms) - 4:42
4. "Boopie" (Felder) - 4:17
5. "Tough Talk" (Wayne Henderson, Joe Sample) - 2:20
6. "No Name Samba" (Felder) - 2:25
7. "Lazy Canary" (Henderson) - 4:15
8. "Lonely Horn" (Felder) - 3:53
9. "Brother Bernard" (Sample) - 4:23

== Personnel ==
The Jazz Crusaders

- Wayne Henderson - trombone
- Wilton Felder - tenor saxophone
- Joe Sample - piano, harpsichord
- Bobby Haynes - bass
- Stix Hooper - drums
