= Robert Popwell =

American jazz-funk guitarist and percussionist

- Also known as: Pops
- Born: Robert Lee Popwell; December 29, 1950; Daytona Beach, Florida, U.S.
- Died: November 27, 2017 (aged 66) Lebanon, Tennessee, U.S.
- Genres: Jazz fusion, smooth jazz, crossover jazz, jazz
- Occupation: Musician
- Instrument: Bass guitar
- Formerly of: The Rascals; The Crusaders

Robert Lee "Pops" Popwell (December 29, 1950 – November 27, 2017) was an American jazz fusion, smooth jazz bass guitarist and percussionist.

== Career ==
Known as "Pops", he played with The Young Rascals , The Crusaders and the Macon Rhythm Section. The Young Rascals were inducted into the Rock and Roll Hall of Fame May 6, 1997. They were inducted into the Vocal Group Hall of Fame in 2005. He has played on albums by Aretha Franklin, George Benson, Ron Wood, Al Jarreau, Bobby Womack, Terry Bradds, Larry Carlton, Joe Sample, Smokey Robinson, Bette Midler, Gregg Allman, Bob Dylan, B. B. King, Les Dudek and Randy Crawford, among others. Most notably he played percussion on Aretha Franklin's Rock Steady.

He has also toured with Bette Midler and Olivia Newton-John. Popwell appeared in the movie Hard to Hold with Rick Springfield. Popwell wrote "Feelin Funky" on The Crusaders album Those Southern Knights.

Popwell died in Lebanon, Tennessee, at the age of 66. He was survived by his wife and three children.

== Discography ==
- 1969: I'm a Loser - Doris Duke
- 1970: Johnny Jenkins - Johnny Jenkins
- 1970: Livingston Taylor - Livingston Taylor
- 1971: Liv - Livingston Taylor
- 1972: The Island Of Real − The Rascals
- 1972: Young, Gifted and Black - Aretha Franklin
- 1973: In Between Tears - Irma Thomas
- 1974: Southern Comfort - The Crusaders
- 1976: Those Southern Knights - The Crusaders
- 1976: Everything Must Change - Randy Crawford
- 1977: Eddie Money - Eddie Money
- 1977: Free As the Wind - The Crusaders
- 1977: Lisa Dal Bello - Lisa Dal Bello
- 1978: Love Island - Eumir Deodato
- 1978: Images - The Crusaders
- 1978: Midnight Believer - B.B. King
- 1978: Letta - Letta Mbulu
- 1979: Gimme Some Neck - Ron Wood
- 1979: Praying Spirit - Gloster Williams and Master Control
- 1979: Livin' Inside Your Love - George Benson
- 1980: Strikes Twice - Larry Carlton
- 1981: Love Life - Brenda Russell
- 1982: Baked potato Superlive! - The Greg Mathieson Project
- 1983: No Frills - Bette Midler
- 1990: Collection - Larry Carlton
- 2006: Sumner Sessions - Terry Bradds
- 2007: Master Hands - Terry Bradds
- 2009: Touch of Spice - Terry Bradds and Nioshi Jackson
