= Talk That Talk (The Jazz Crusaders album) =

Studio album by The Jazz Crusaders
- Released: 1966
- Recorded: February 7, 1966
- Studio: Pacific Jazz Studios, Hollywood, CA
- Genre: Jazz
- Length: 38:07
- Label: Pacific Jazz; PJ 10106
- Producer: Richard Bock

The Jazz Crusaders chronology
Live at the Lighthouse '66 (1966)	Talk That Talk (1966)	The Festival Album (1966)

Talk That Talk is the ninth album by The Jazz Crusaders recorded in 1966 and released on the Pacific Jazz label.

== Reception ==
Professional ratings
Review scores
Source	Rating
AllMusic	4.5/5 stars

AllMusic rated the album with 4½ stars; in their review, Scott Yanow said: "The solos (particularly by tenor saxophonist Wilton Felder and trombonist Wayne Henderson) are fine but the material (a few group originals plus pop tunes such as "Walk on By" and "Hey Girl") is uniformly lightweight and rather forgettable".

== Track listing ==
1. "Walkin' My Cat Named Dog" (Norma Tanega) - 2:38
2. "Studewood" (Wayne Henderson) - 2:15
3. "I Can't Believe You Love Me" (Clarence Gaskill, Jimmy McHugh) - 2:39
4. "There Is a Time (Le Temps)" (Gene Lees, Charles Aznavour, Jeff Davis) - 2:06
5. "Hey Girl" (Gerry Goffin, Carole King) - 2:23
6. "Uptight (Everything's Alright)" (Stevie Wonder, Sylvia Moy, Henry Cosby) - 2:30
7. "Arrastao" (Edu Lobo, Vinícius de Moraes) - 2:38
8. "Mohair Sam" (Dallas Frazier) - 2:28
9. "Walk On By" (Burt Bacharach, Hal David) - 2:49
10. "1, 2, 3" (John Medora, David White, Len Barry) - 2:43
11. "The Shadow Do" (Henderson) - 2:39
12. "Turkish Black" (Wilton Felder) - 2:16

== Personnel ==
The Jazz Crusaders

- Wayne Henderson - trombone
- Wilton Felder - tenor saxophone
- Joe Sample - piano
- Leroy Vinnegar - bass
- Stix Hooper - drums
- Overdubbed unidentified big band
