= Stretchin' Out (The Jazz Crusaders album) =

Studio album by The Jazz Crusaders
- Released: 1964
- Recorded: September 24, 1963 and July 19, 1964
- Studio: Pacific Jazz Studios, Hollywood, California
- Genre: Jazz
- Length: 40:09
- Label: Pacific Jazz
- Producer: Richard Bock

The Jazz Crusaders chronology
Jazz Waltz (1963)	Stretchin' Out (1964)	The Thing (1965)

Stretchin' Out is the seventh album by The Jazz Crusaders recorded in 1964 (with one track from 1963) and released on the Pacific Jazz label.

== Reception ==
Professional ratings
Review scores
Source	Rating
AllMusic	2/5 stars

AllMusic rated the album with 2 stars.

== Track listing ==
1. "Long John" (Wilton Felder) - 4:58
2. "Robbin's Nest" (Illinois Jacquet, Sir Charles Thompson) - 5:45
3. "You Are Only Sometimes Rain" (Wayne Henderson) - 3:29
4. "Out Back" (Wes Montgomery) - 6:03
5. "Bachafillen" (Garnett Brown) - 5:53
6. "I'll Remember Tomorrow" (Joe Sample) - 4:50
7. "Polka Dots and Moonbeams" (Jimmy Van Heusen, Johnny Burke) - 5:38
8. "Sweetwater" (Sample) - 3:08

== Personnel ==
The Jazz Crusaders

- Wayne Henderson - trombone, euphonium
- Wilton Felder - tenor saxophone, alto saxophone
- Joe Sample - piano
- Joe Pass - guitar
- Monk Montgomery - bass (tracks 1, 2 & 4–8)
- Bobby Haynes - bass (track 3)
- Stix Hooper - drums
