= Uh Huh (The Jazz Crusaders album) =

Studio album by The Jazz Crusaders
- Released: 1967
- Recorded: May 15, 1967; Pacific Jazz Studios, Hollywood, CA
- Genre: Jazz
- Length: 44:10
- Label: Pacific Jazz; PJ 10124
- Producer: Richard Bock

The Jazz Crusaders chronology
The Festival Album (1966)	Uh Huh (1967)	Lighthouse '68 (1968)

Uh Huh is the ninth studio album by The Jazz Crusaders recorded in 1967 and released on the Pacific Jazz label.

== Reception ==
Professional ratings
Review scores
Source	Rating
AllMusic	4.5/5 stars

AllMusic rated the album with 4½ stars; in its review, Scott Yanow said: "Their brand of soulful hard bop (utilizing their distinctive tenor-trombone frontline) is heard throughout at its prime".

== Track listing ==
1. "Blue Monday" (Joe Sample) - 9:45
2. "Night Theme" (Stix Hooper) - 7:36
3. "Uh Huh" (Wayne Henderson) - 6:20
4. "Air Waves" (Sample) - 9:21
5. "Ice Water" (Henderson) - 6:41
6. "Watts Happening" (Sample) - 5:12

== Personnel ==
- Wayne Henderson – trombone
- Wilton Felder – tenor saxophone
- Joe Sample – piano
- Buster Williams – bass
- Stix Hooper – drums
