= The Thing (Jazz Crusaders album) =

Studio album by The Jazz Crusaders
- Released: 1965
- Recorded: February 5 & 22, 1965
- Studio: Pacific Jazz Studios, Hollywood, CA
- Genre: Jazz
- Label: Pacific Jazz; PJ 87
- Producer: Richard Bock

The Jazz Crusaders chronology
Stretchin' Out (1964)	The Thing (1965)	Chile Con Soul (1965)

The Thing is the eighth album by The Jazz Crusaders recorded in 1965 and released on the Pacific Jazz label.

== Reception ==
Professional ratings
Review scores
Source	Rating
AllMusic	3/5 stars

AllMusic rated the album with 3 stars.

== Track listing ==
1. "The Thing" (Joe Sample) - 4:40
2. "Sunset in Mountains" (Wayne Henderson) - 5:10
3. "While the City Sleeps" (Charles Strouse, Lee Adams) - 3:35
4. "White Cobra" (Sample) - 4:45
5. "New Time Shuffle" (Sample) - 4:40
6. "Para Mi Espoza" (Stix Hooper) - 6:40
7. "Soul Kosher" (Wilton Felder) - 5:35

== Personnel ==
The Jazz Crusaders

- Wayne Henderson – trombone
- Wilton Felder – tenor saxophone
- Joe Sample – piano
- Monk Montgomery – bass (tracks 2, 3, 6 & 7)
- Victor Gaskin – bass (tracks 1, 4 & 5)
- Stix Hooper – drums
