= Lighthouse '69 =

Live album by The Jazz Crusaders
- Released: 1969
- Recorded: July 26–27, 1969
- Venue: The Lighthouse Hermosa Beach, CA
- Genre: Jazz
- Label: Pacific Jazz; ST 20165
- Producer: Richard Bock

The Jazz Crusaders chronology
Powerhouse (1968)	Lighthouse '69 (1969)	Give Peace a Chance (1970)

Lighthouse '69 is a live album by The Jazz Crusaders recorded in 1969 and released on the Pacific Jazz label.

== Reception ==
Professional ratings
Review scores
Source	Rating
AllMusic	3/5 stars
DownBeat	1.5/5 stars

AllMusic rated the album with 3 stars noting: "as usual the group transforms the music into their own brand of soulful and funky hard bop". Harvey Pekar, writing for DownBeat in a contemporary review, panned the album as "a commercial and not particularly interesting record".

== Track listing ==
1. "Get Back" (John Lennon, Paul McCartney) — 4:10
2. "It's Gotta Be Real" (Larry Ramos) — 6:35
3. "Willie and Laura Mae Jones" (Tony Joe White) — 3:40
4. "Rubie P'Gonia" (Buster Williams) — 7:51
5. "It's Your Thing" (Ronald Isley, O'Kelly Isley, Jr., Rudolph Isley) — 5:17
6. "Inside the Outside" (Stix Hooper) — 6:28
7. "Reflections" (Wayne Henderson) — 6:35
8. "Svenska Flicka" (Joe Sample) — 4:53

== Personnel ==
- Wayne Henderson — trombone
- Wilton Felder — tenor saxophone
- Joe Sample — piano, electric piano
- Buster Williams — bass
- Stix Hooper — drums
