= The Jazz Crusaders at the Lighthouse =

Live album by The Jazz Crusaders
- Released: 1962
- Recorded: August 5–6, 1962
- Venue: The Lighthouse, Hermosa Beach, CA
- Genre: Jazz
- Length: 46:49
- Label: Pacific Jazz; PJ 57
- Producer: Richard Bock

The Jazz Crusaders chronology
Lookin' Ahead (1962)	The Jazz Crusaders at the Lighthouse (1962)	Tough Talk (1963)

The Jazz Crusaders at the Lighthouse is a live album by The Jazz Crusaders recorded in 1962 and released on the Pacific Jazz label.

== Reception ==
Professional ratings
Review scores
Source	Rating
AllMusic	3/5 stars

AllMusic rated the album with 3 stars.

== Track listing ==
1. "Congolese Sermon" (Wayne Henderson) - 6:50
2. "Cathy's Dilemma" (Henderson) - 7:07
3. "Blues for Ramona" (Stix Hooper) - 7:10
4. "Weather Beat" (Joe Sample) - 7:05
5. "Scandalizing" (Sample) - 7:12
6. "Appointment in Ghana" (Jackie McLean) - 6:55
7. "Penny Blue" (Sample) - 7:31 Bonus track on CD reissue
8. "Boopie" (Wilton Felder) - 9:28 Bonus track on CD reissue

== Personnel ==
The Jazz Crusaders

- Wayne Henderson – trombone
- Wilton Felder – tenor saxophone
- Joe Sample – piano
- Victor Gaskin – bass
- Stix Hooper – drums
