= Heat Wave (The Jazz Crusaders album) =

Studio album by The Jazz Crusaders
- Released: 1963
- Recorded: September 24–26, 1963
- Studio: Pacific Jazz Studios, Hollywood, California
- Genre: Jazz
- Label: Pacific Jazz
- Producer: Richard Bock

The Jazz Crusaders chronology
Tough Talk (1963)	Heat Wave (1963)	Jazz Waltz (1963)

Heat Wave is the fifth album by The Jazz Crusaders recorded in 1963 and released on the Pacific Jazz label.

== Reception ==
Professional ratings
Review scores
Source	Rating
AllMusic	2/5 stars

AllMusic rated the album with 2 stars; in his review, Scott Yanow said: "Some of the material is rather unlikely for the popular hard bop group ...but the band performs those tunes plus a few originals with their usual ingenuity and soulful approach".

== Track listing ==
1. "On Broadway" (Barry Mann, Cynthia Weil, Jerry Leiber, Mike Stoller) - 2:27
2. "Green Back Dollar" (Hoyt Axton, Ken Ramsey) - 2:20
3. "Close Shave" (Joe Sample) - 2:35
4. "Free Sample" (Sample) - 3:31
5. "Mr. Sandman" (Pat Ballard) - 2:58
6. "Heat Wave" (Irving Berlin) - 2:52
7. "Sassy" (Les McCann) - 4:27
8. "Theme from The L-Shaped Room (T-Shaped Twist)" (John Barry) - 4:11
9. "Some Samba" (Wayne Henderson) - 2:35
10. "Stix March" (Stix Hooper) - 2:44
11. "Purple Onion" (Wilton Felder) - 2:55

== Personnel ==
The Jazz Crusaders

- Wayne Henderson - trombone
- Wilton Felder - tenor saxophone
- Joe Sample - piano, harpsichord
- Bobby Haynes - bass
- Stix Hooper - drums
