= Grammy Award for Best R&B Instrumental Performance =

Music award category

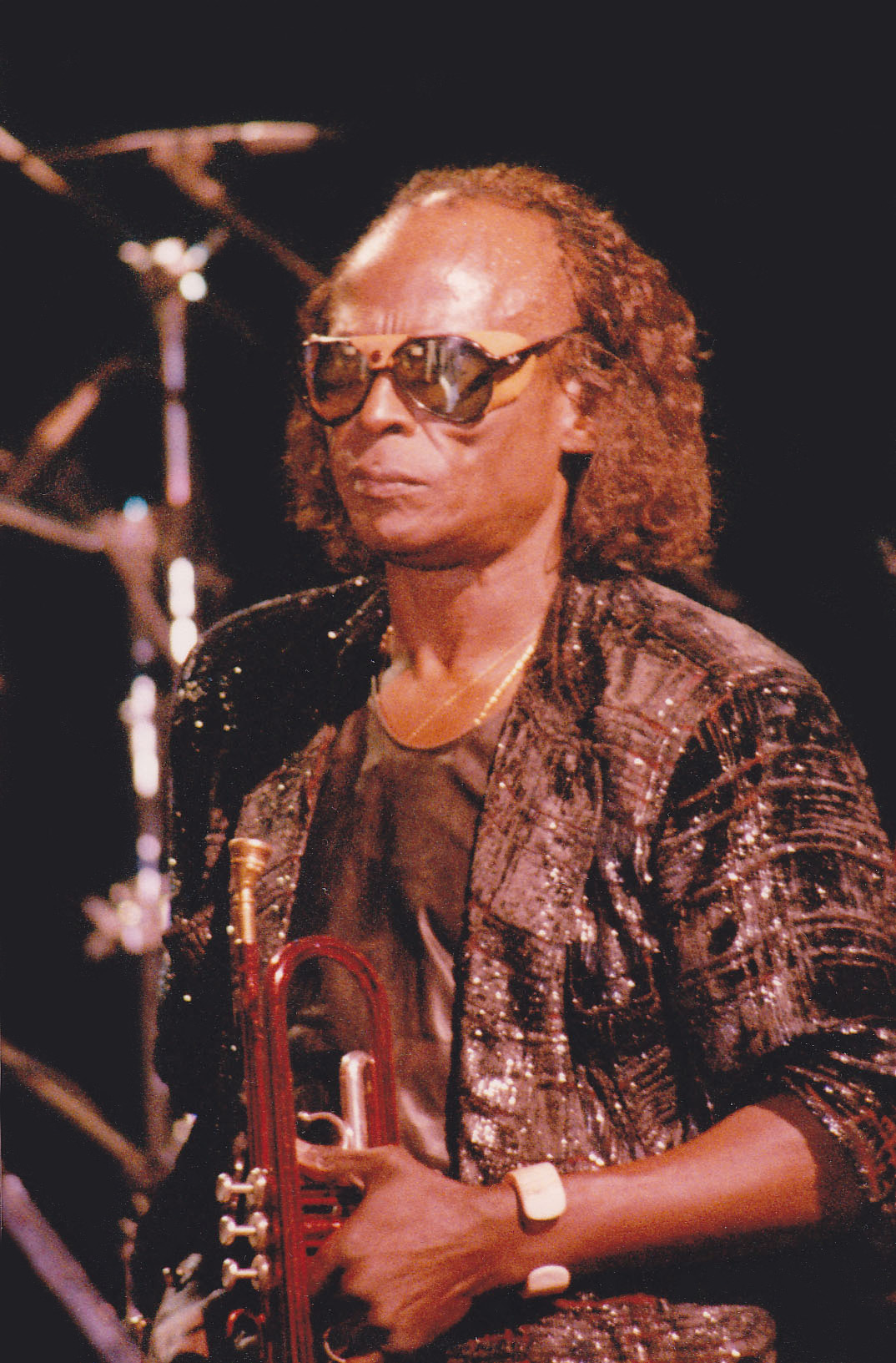
Miles Davis at Stratusbourg

The Grammy Award for Best R&B Instrumental Performance was awarded from 1970 to 1990 and in 1993. The award had several minor name changes:

- From 1970 to 1985 the award was known as Best R&B Instrumental Performance
- From 1986 to 1989 it was awarded as Best R&B Instrumental Performance (Orchestra, Group or Soloist)
- In 1990 and 1993 it was awarded as Best R&B Instrumental Performance

Years reflect the year in which the Grammy Awards were presented, for works released in the previous year.

== Recipients ==
Year	Winner(s)	Title	Nominees	Ref.
1970	King Curtis	"Games People Play"	Ike Turner for "A Black Man's Soul"; Albert Collins for "Trash Talkin'"; Junior Walker & The All-Stars for "What Does It Take"; Richard Groove Holmes for "Workin' On a Groovy Thing"	
1971	No Award Given			
1972	No Award Given			
1973	Paul Riser & The Temptations	"Papa Was a Rollin' Stone (Instrumental)"	The Crusaders for "Crusaders I"; King Curtis for "Everybody's Talkin'"; Curtis Mayfield for "Junkie Chase"; Isaac Hayes for "Let's Stay Together"	
1974	Ramsey Lewis	"Hang On Sloopy"	The Crusaders for "2nd Crusade"; Donald Byrd for "Black Byrd"; Manu Dibango for "Soul Makossa"; Young-Holt Unlimited for "Yes We Can Can"	
1975	MFSB	"TSOP (The Sound of Philadelphia)"	Kool & the Gang for "Light of Worlds"; Average White Band for "Pick Up the Pieces"; The Crusaders for "Scratch"; Billy Preston for "Struttin'"	
1976	Silver Convention	"Fly, Robin, Fly"	Van McCoy and the Soul City Symphony for "Disco Baby"; B. T. Express for "Express"; Herbie Hancock for "Hang Up Your Hangups"; Brecker Brothers for "Sneakin' Up Behind You"	
1977	George Benson	"Theme From Good King Bad"	Marvin Gaye for "After the Dance"; Brass Construction for "Brass Construction"; Herbie Hancock for "Doin' It"; Stanley Turrentine for "Hope That We Can Be Together Soon"; The Crusaders for "Keep That Same Old Feeling"	
1978	The Brothers Johnson	"Q"	Brecker Brothers for "Funky Sea, Funky Dew"; Salsoul Orchestra for "Getaway"; Stuff for "More Stuff"; Blackbyrds for "The Unfinished Business"	
1979	Earth, Wind & Fire	"Runnin'"	The Crusaders for "Images"; Stanley Clarke for "Modern Man"; Brothers Johnson for "Streetwave"; Average White Band for "Sweet and Sour"	
1980	Earth, Wind & Fire	"Boogie Wonderland"	Hubert Laws for "Land of Passion"; Herbie Hancock for "Ready or Not"; Harvey Mason for "Wave"; Junior Walker for "Wishing On a Star"	
1981	George Benson	"Off Broadway"	David Sanborn for "Anything You Want"; Deodato for "Night Cruiser"; Brothers Johnson for "Smilin' on Ya"; B.B. King for "When I'm Wrong"	
1982	David Sanborn	"All I Need Is You"	Noel Pointer for "East St. Louis Melody"; Wilton Felder for "Inherit the Wind"; Hiroshima for "Winds of Change (Henka Non Nagare)"; Ahmad Jamal for "You're Welcome, Stop On By"	
1983	Marvin Gaye	"Sexual Healing (Instrumental Version)"	Eddie Murphy for "Boogie in Your Butt"; Grover Washington Jr. for "Come Morning"; Patrice Rushen for "Number One"; Spyro Gyra for "Stripes"	
1984	Herbie Hancock	"Rockit"	Quincy Jones, Jerry Hey for "Billie Jean"; Kashif for "The Mood"; James Brown for "Today"; The Gap Band for "Where Are We Going?"	
1985	Herbie Hancock	"Sound-System"	The Crusaders for "Ghetto Blaster"; Grover Washington Jr. for "Inside Moves"; Sheila E. for "Shortberry Strawcake"; Stanley Clarke for "Time Exposure"	
1986	Ernie Watts	"Musician"	Sly & Robbie for "Bass and Trouble"; Barney Rachabane for "Caribbean Queen (No More Love on the Run)"; Five Star for "First Avenue"; Dave Valentin for "Love Light in Flight"; Jeff Lorber for "Pacific Coast Highway"; Paul Hardcastle for "Rain Forest"	
1987	Yellowjackets	"And You Know That"	Kenny G for Duotones; Kashif for "Movie Song"; Stanley Clarke for "The Boys of Johnson Street"; Billy Cobham for "Zanzibar Breeze"	
1988	David Sanborn	"Chicago Song"	Stanley Turrentine for "Boogie on Reggae Woman"; Herb Alpert for "Diamonds"; Jonathan Butler for "Going Home"; Najee for Najee's Theme	
1989	Chick Corea	"Light Years"	Cornell Dupree & Who It Is for Coast to Coast; Paul Jackson Jr. for I Came to Play; George Howard for Reflections; Gerald Albright for "So Amazing"; Doc Powell for "What's Going On"	
1990	Soul II Soul	"African Dance"	Gerald Albright for Bermuda Nights; Omar Hakim for "Constructive Criticism"; Stix Hooper for "I Can't Get Enough of Your Love"; Babyface for "It's No Crime"	
1991	No Award Given			
1992	No Award Given			
1993	Miles Davis	Doo-Bop	The Brecker Brothers for "Big Idea"; George Howard for "Just the Way I Feel"; Soul II Soul for "Mood"; Grover Washington Jr. for "Summer Chill"	
