= Freedom Sound (The Jazz Crusaders album) =

Studio album by The Jazz Crusaders
- Released: 1961
- Recorded: May 24, 1961
- Studios: Pacific Jazz Studios, Hollywood, California
- Genre: Jazz
- Length: 46:49
- Label: Pacific Jazz
- Producer: Richard Bock

The Jazz Crusaders chronology
Freedom Sound (1961)	Lookin' Ahead (1962)

Freedom Sound is the debut album by The Jazz Crusaders, which was recorded in 1961 and released on the Pacific Jazz label.

== Reception ==
Professional ratings
Review scores
Source	Rating
AllMusic	4/5 stars

AllMusic rated the album with 4 stars; in his review, Scott Yanow said the band: "strikes a balance between creative hard bop and accessible soul-jazz".

== Track listing ==
1. "The Geek" (Wilton Felder) – 5:50
2. "M.J.S. Funk" (Wayne Henderson) – 5:55
3. "That's It" (Felder) – 4:42
4. "Freedom Sound" (Joe Sample) – 8:24
5. "Theme from Exodus" (Ernest Gold) – 3:50
6. "Coon" (Henderson) – 4:20
7. "M.J.S. Funk" (Alternate Version) – 8:15 (on CD only)
8. "Coon" (Alternate Version) – 5:48 (on CD only)

== Personnel ==
The Jazz Crusaders were:

- Wayne Henderson – trombone
- Wilton Felder – tenor saxophone
- Joe Sample – piano
- Roy Gaines – guitar (tracks 1 & 4)
- Jimmy Bond – bass
- Stix Hooper – drums
