= Chile Con Soul =

Studio album by The Jazz Crusaders
- Released: 1965
- Recorded: July 1 & 2, 1965
- Studio: Pacific Jazz Studios, Hollywood, CA
- Genre: Jazz
- Length: 38:07
- Label: Pacific Jazz; PJ 10092
- Producer: Richard Bock

The Jazz Crusaders chronology
The Thing (1965)	Chile Con Soul (1965)	Live at the Lighthouse '66 (1966)

Chile Con Soul, recorded in 1965 and released on the Pacific Jazz label, is the ninth album by The Jazz Crusaders.

== Reception ==
Professional ratings
Review scores
Source	Rating
AllMusic	4/5 stars
The Penguin Guide to Jazz Recordings	3/4 stars

AllMusic rated the album with 4 stars; in their review, Lindsay Planer said: "Chile con Soul (1965) is one of the best examples of The Jazz Crusaders at one of the many musical pinnacles in their 30-plus year existence".

== Track listing ==
1. "Agua Dulce (Sweetwater)" (Joe Sample) - 5:25
2. "Soul Bourgeoisie" (Hubert Laws) - 7:44
3. "Ontem a Note" (Clare Fischer) - 4:19
4. "Tough Talk" (Wayne Henderson, Stix Hooper) - 2:38
5. "Tacos" (Laws) - 4:08
6. "Latin Bit" (Kenny Cox) - 4:08
7. "The Breeze and I" (Ernesto Lecuona, Al Stillman) - 5:08
8. "Dulzura" (Fischer) - 4:37

== Personnel ==
- Wayne Henderson - trombone
- Wilton Felder - tenor saxophone
- Hubert Laws - flute
- Joe Sample - piano
- Clare Fischer - organ
- Al McKibbon - bass
- Stix Hooper - drums
- Carlos Vidal - congas
- Hungaria Garcia - timbales, cowbells
