= Powerhouse (The Jazz Crusaders album) =

Studio album by The Jazz Crusaders
- Released: May 1969
- Recorded: July 9–11, 1968
- Genre: Jazz, jazz fusion
- Label: Pacific Jazz
- Producer: Richard Bock

The Jazz Crusaders chronology
Lighthouse '68 (1968)	Powerhouse (1969)	Lighthouse '69 (1969)

Powerhouse is a 1969 album by The Jazz Crusaders. It was their fourteenth album produced by Richard Bock for World Pacific Jazz Records. It was the first album in which Joe Sample played on the Fender Rhodes and according to Thom Jurek in his AllMusic review, would mark a turning point for the band.

Professional ratings
Review scores
Source	Rating
Allmusic	3/5 stars

== Track listing ==
1. "Promises, Promises" - (Burt Bacharach, Hal David)
2. "Love and Peace" - (Arthur Adams)
3. "Hey Jude" - (John Lennon, Paul McCartney)
4. "Sting Ray" - (Wayne Henderson)
5. "Fancy Dance" - (Joe Sample)
6. "Love is Blue" - (André Popp, Blackburn, Pierre Cour)
7. "Cookie Man" - (Wayne Henderson)
8. "Upstairs" - (Burt Bacharach, Hal David)
9. "Fire Water" - (Charles Williams)

== Personnel ==
- Wayne Henderson – trombone
- Wilton Felder – saxophone
- Joe Sample – keyboards
- Charles "Buster" Williams – bass
- Stix Hooper – drums

== Charts ==
Chart (1969)	Peak position
US Top LPs	184
US Soul LPs	38
US Jazz LPs	6
