= Street Life (The Crusaders album) =

Studio album by the Crusaders
- Released: May 1979
- Recorded: 1979
- Studios: Hollywood Sound (Hollywood, California)
- Genres: Jazz, R&B, disco
- Length: 39:21
- Label: MCA
- Producers: Wilton Felder; Stix Hooper; Joe Sample

The Crusaders chronology
Images (1978)	Street Life (1979)	Rhapsody and Blues (1980)

Singles from Street Life
- 1. "Street Life / The Hustler" Released: 1979

Street Life is a studio album by the American jazz band the Crusaders. It was a top 20 album on three Billboard charts and represents the peak of the band's commercial popularity. The title track, featuring singer Randy Crawford, was a Top 40 pop single (No. 36) and became the group's most successful entry on the soul chart (No. 17). It was No. 5 on the UK Singles Chart. "Street Life" also hit the disco chart, peaking at No. 75, and was re-recorded by Doc Severinsen with Crawford reprising her vocal for the opening sequence of the noir crime drama Sharky's Machine, directed by Burt Reynolds in 1981. This faster-paced version was also featured in Quentin Tarantino's Jackie Brown, released in 1997.

The cover photograph was taken at 409 N Rodeo Drive, Beverly Hills, California.

== Critical reception ==
Professional ratings
Review scores
Source	Rating
AllMusic	4/5 stars
The Penguin Guide to Jazz Recordings	4/4 stars
The Rolling Stone Jazz Record Guide	2/5 stars

The Bay State Banner noted that "Crawford's voice has passion and intensity, unlike the meanderings heard on her albums."

The album was included in the book 1001 Albums You Must Hear Before You Die.

== Track listing ==
1. "Street Life" (Will Jennings, Joe Sample) – 11:18
2. "My Lady" (Wilton Felder) – 6:43
3. "Rodeo Drive (High Steppin')" (Sample) – 4:28
4. "Carnival of the Night" (Felder) – 6:24
5. "The Hustler" (Stix Hooper) – 5:18
6. "Night Faces" (Sample) – 5:10

== Personnel ==
The Crusaders

- Wilton Felder – tenor saxophone (1–4), electric bass (1, 2, 5), alto saxophone (5, 6)
- Joe Sample – keyboards, horn and string arrangements
- Stix Hooper – drums, percussion

Additional musicians and vocalists

- Randy Crawford – vocals (1)
- Louis Aldebert – vocals (2)
- Monique Aldebert – vocals (2)
- Arthur Adams – guitars (1, 4)
- Roland Bautista – guitars (1, 4)
- Billy Rogers – guitars (1)
- Barry Finnerty – guitars (2–5)
- Paul Jackson Jr. – guitars (2, 5)
- David T. Walker – guitars (4)
- Alphonso Johnson – bass (3, 6)
- James Jamerson Jr. – bass (4)
- Paulinho da Costa – percussion (1–5)
- Jerome Richardson – alto saxophone (1)
- William Green – baritone saxophone (1)
- Robert Bryant Jr. – tenor saxophone (1)
- Maurice Spears – bass trombone (1, 3)
- Garnett Brown – tenor trombone (1, 3)
- Oscar Brashear – trumpet (1, 3)
- Bobby Bryant Sr. – trumpet (1)
- Benjamin Barrett – orchestra manager for strings

Production

- Wilton Felder – producer
- Joe Sample – producer
- Stix Hooper – producer
- Rik Pekkonen – engineer, mixing
- Bernie Grundman – mastering at A&M Studios (Hollywood, California)
- Tom Hooper – executive assistant
- Pamela Hope Lobue – production coordinator
- Stuart Kusher – art direction
- Jayme Odgers – design, photography

== Charts ==
Album - Billboard (United States)

Year	Chart	Position
1979	Black Albums	3
1979	Jazz Albums	1
1979	Pop Albums	18

Singles - Billboard (United States)

Year	Chart	Single	Position
1979	Black Singles	"Street Life"	17
1979	Club Play Singles	"Street Life"	75
1979	Pop Singles	"Street Life"	36
