= The Festival Album =

Live album by The Jazz Crusaders
- Released: 1966
- Recorded: July 4 and October 8, 1966; Newport Jazz Festival, Newport, RI and Pacific Jazz Festival, Costa Mesa, CA
- Genre: Jazz, hard bop, modal jazz
- Length: 56:50
- Label: Pacific Jazz; PJ 10115
- Producer: Richard Bock

The Jazz Crusaders chronology
Talk That Talk (1966)	The Festival Album (1966)	Uh Huh (1967)

The Festival Album is a live album by The Jazz Crusaders recorded in 1966 at Newport Jazz Festival in Rhode Island and Pacific Jazz Festival in California. It was released on the Pacific Jazz label that same year.

== Reception ==
Professional ratings
Review scores
Source	Rating
AllMusic	3.5/5 stars
The Penguin Guide to Jazz Recordings	3/4 stars

AllMusic rated the album with 3½ stars noting: "The Festival Album was the only live set by the Jazz Crusaders not recorded at the Lighthouse. As such, it is a compilation of performances recorded at the Pacific Jazz and Newport Festivals in 1966".

== Track listing ==
1. "Introduction - 0:34
2. "Trance Dance" (Kenny Cox) - 9:28
3. "Summer's Madness" (Joe Sample, Wayne Henderson, Wilton Felder) - 10:06
4. "Young Rabbits" (Henderson) - 7:49
5. "Freedom Sound" (Sample) - 7:59
6. "Wilton's Boogaloo" (Felder) - 11:35 Bonus track on CD reissue
7. "Half and Half" (Charles Davis) - 9:14 Bonus track on CD reissue
- Recorded at the Newport Jazz Festival in Newport, RI on July 4, 1966 (tracks 4 & 5), at the Pacific Jazz Festival in Costa Mesa, CA on October 8, 1966 (tracks 1–3) and at Shelly's Manne-Hole in Hollywood, CA on July 19, 1968 (tracks 6 & 7)

== Personnel ==
- Wayne Henderson - trombone
- Wilton Felder - tenor saxophone
- Joe Sample - piano
- Jimmy Bond (tracks 1–3), Herbie Lewis (tracks 4 & 5), Buster Williams (tracks 6 & 7) - bass
- Stix Hooper - drums
