= Live at the Lighthouse '66 =

Live album by The Jazz Crusaders
- Released: 1966
- Recorded: January 14–16, 1966
- Venue: The Lighthouse, Hermosa Beach, CA
- Genre: Jazz
- Length: 60:31
- Label: Pacific Jazz; PJ 10098
- Producer: Richard Bock

The Jazz Crusaders chronology
Chile Con Soul (1965)	Live at the Lighthouse '66 (1966)	Talk That Talk (1966)

Live at the Lighthouse '66 is a live album by The Jazz Crusaders recorded in 1966 and released on the Pacific Jazz label.

== Reception ==
Professional ratings
Review scores
Source	Rating
AllMusic	4.5/5 stars
The Penguin Guide to Jazz Recordings	3/4 stars

AllMusic rated the album with 4½ stars calling it: "An excellent set of primarily straight-ahead (but soulful) jazz".

== Track listing ==
1. "Aleluia" (Rey Guerra, Edu Lobo) - 6:00
2. "Blues Up Tight" (Joe Sample) - 6:43
3. "You Don't Know What Love Is" (Gene de Paul, Don Raye) - 5:06
4. "Miss It" (Wilton Felder) - 5:53
5. "'Round Midnight" (Thelonious Monk, Bernie Hanighen, Cootie Williams) - 5:56 Bonus track on CD reissue
6. "Some Other Blues" (John Coltrane) - 9:00 Bonus track on CD reissue
7. "Scratch" (Wayne Henderson) - 8:02
8. "Doin' That Thing" (Leroy Vinnegar) - 7:18
9. "Milestones" (Miles Davis) - 6:43

== Personnel ==
The Jazz Crusaders

- Wayne Henderson - trombone
- Wilton Felder - tenor saxophone
- Joe Sample - piano
- Leroy Vinnegar - bass
- Stix Hooper - drums
