= Lookin' Ahead =

Studio album by The Jazz Crusaders
- Released: 1962
- Recorded: January 7, 1962; January 19, 1962
- Studio: Pacific Jazz Studios; Hollywood, California, U.S.
- Genre: Jazz
- Label: Pacific Jazz; PJ 43
- Producer: Richard Bock

The Jazz Crusaders chronology
Freedom Sound (1961)	Lookin' Ahead (1962)	The Jazz Crusaders at the Lighthouse (1962)

Lookin' Ahead is the second album by The Jazz Crusaders recorded in 1962 and released on Pacific Jazz Records.

== Reception ==
Professional ratings
Review scores
Source	Rating
AllMusic	4/5 stars

Writing for AllMusic, Scott Yanow wrote, "The tenor-trombone frontline created by Wilton Felder and Henderson, along with the funky yet swinging playing of pianist Joe Sample, drummer Stix Hooper and bassist Jimmy Bond on this hard-to-find set made the group instantly recognizable and surprisingly popular from the start".

== Track listing ==
1. "Song of India" (Nikolai Rimsky-Korsakov) – 4:02
2. "Big Hunk of Funk" (Wilton Felder) – 5:00
3. "Tonight" (Leonard Bernstein, Stephen Sondheim) – 2:50
4. "507 Neyland" (Wayne Henderson) – 3:56
5. "Till All Ends" (Joe Sample) – 3:33
6. "Tortoise and the Hare" (Sample) – 4:24
7. "In a Dream" (Henderson) – 3:20
8. "Sinnin' Sam" (Stix Hooper) – 4:39
9. "The Young Rabbits" (Henderson) – 3:35

== Personnel ==
- Wayne Henderson – trombone
- Wilton Felder – tenor saxophone
- Joe Sample – piano
- Jimmy Bond – bass
- Stix Hooper – drums
