= Lighthouse '68 =

Live album by The Jazz Crusaders
- Released: 1968
- Recorded: November 10–13, 1967
- Venues: The Lighthouse Hermosa Beach, CA
- Genre: Jazz
- Length: 73:39
- Labels: Pacific Jazz; PJ 10131
- Producer: Richard Bock

The Jazz Crusaders chronology
Uh Huh (1967)	Lighthouse '68 (1968)	Powerhouse (1968)

Singles from Lighthouse '68
- 1. "Ooga-Boo-Ga-Loo / Eleanor Rigby"

Lighthouse '68 is a live album by The Jazz Crusaders recorded in 1967 and released on the Pacific Jazz label.

== Reception ==
Professional ratings
Review scores
Source	Rating
AllMusic	4/5 stars
The Penguin Guide to Jazz Recordings	3.5/4 stars

AllMusic rated the album with 4 stars noting: "Feel is what dictates the material and its execution on this set, without unnecessary attention paid to crowd or recording apparatus. This is one [of] the most intimate jazz shows captured on tape during the 1960s. It gives record buyers the sound of a band in full possession of their considerable capabilities, celebrating them in a relaxed environment, playing their own brand of grooved-out '60s jazz".

== Track listing ==
1. "Ooga-Boo-Ga-Loo" (Stix Hooper) - 6:39
2. "Eleanor Rigby" (John Lennon, Paul McCartney) - 7:32
3. "Native Dancer" (Buster Williams) - 8:52
4. "Never Had It So Good" (Joe Sample) - 7:15
5. "The Emperor" (Williams) - 8:50
6. "Impressions" (John Coltrane) - 6:12
7. "Cathy the Cooker" (Wayne Henderson) - 6:22 Bonus track on CD reissue
8. "Shadows" (Williams) - 4:03 Bonus track on CD reissue
9. "Tough Talk" (Henderson, Hooper, Sample) - 8:01 Bonus track on CD reissue
10. "Third Principle" (Wilton Felder) - 8:45 Bonus track on CD reissue

== Personnel ==
- Wayne Henderson - trombone
- Wilton Felder - tenor saxophone
- Joe Sample - piano
- Buster Williams - bass
- Stix Hooper - drums
