= Jazz Waltz (Les McCann and the Jazz Crusaders album) =

Studio album by Les McCann & the Jazz Crusaders
- Released: 1963
- Recorded: Late 1963
- Studio: Pacific Jazz Studios, Hollywood, CA
- Genre: Jazz
- Length: 31:43
- Label: Pacific Jazz; PJ 81
- Producer: Richard Bock

Les McCann chronology
Soul Hits (1963)	Jazz Waltz (1963)	Spanish Onions (1964)

The Jazz Crusaders chronology
Heat Wave (1963)	Jazz Waltz (1963)	Stretchin' Out (1964)

Jazz Waltz is an album by pianist Les McCann with the Jazz Crusaders recorded in 1963 and released on the Pacific Jazz label.

== Reception ==
Professional ratings
Review scores
Source	Rating
Allmusic	3/5 stars

Allmusic gives the album 3 stars.

== Track listing ==
All compositions by Les McCann except where noted.

1. "Spanish Castles" (George Gruntz) - 2:24
2. "Blues for Yna Yna" (Gerald Wilson) - 3:08
3. "Damascus" - 4:09
4. "3/4 For God & Co." - 3:24
5. "Bluesette" (Toots Thielemans) - 2:58
6. "Big City" (Marvin Jenkins) - 2:35
7. "This Here" (Bobby Timmons) - 2:59
8. "Jitterbug Waltz" (Fats Waller) - 3:42
9. "All Blues" (Miles Davis) - 4:12
10. "Jazz Waltz" (Bobby Haynes) - 2:45

== Personnel ==
- Les McCann - piano, organ, electric piano

The Jazz Crusaders

- Wayne Henderson - trombone
- Wilton Felder - tenor saxophone
- Joe Sample - piano, organ
- Bobby Haynes - bass
- Stix Hooper - drums
