= The Crusaders (jazz fusion group) =

American jazz fusion group

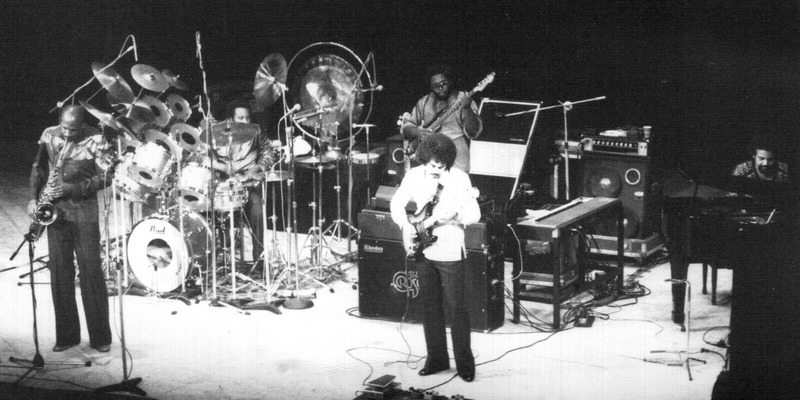
- The Crusaders in 1978

Background information
- Also known as: The Jazz Crusaders
- Origin: Houston, Texas, U.S.
- Genres: Jazz; jazz fusion; soul jazz; jazz-funk
- Years active: 1960–2010
- Labels: Pacific Jazz; ABC/Blue Thumb; MCA; GRP
- Past members: Wilton Felder; Joe Sample; Stix Hooper; Wayne Henderson; Larry Carlton; Robert Popwell; Max Bennett; Hubert Laws; Jimmy Bond; Monk Montgomery; Arthur Adams; Buster Williams; Bobby Haynes; Billy Rogers

The Crusaders (formerly known as The Jazz Crusaders) were an American jazz/jazz fusion group performing from the 1960s to 2010. Known firstly from their 1960 inception as the Jazz Crusaders they eventually renamed themselves in 1971 to simply the Crusaders. A wide range of genres such as Jazz, R&B, Jazz-rock, the Blues and Jazz-funk are cohesively featured on the group's albums. The Crusaders have also had a total of nine Grammy nominations.

== Career ==
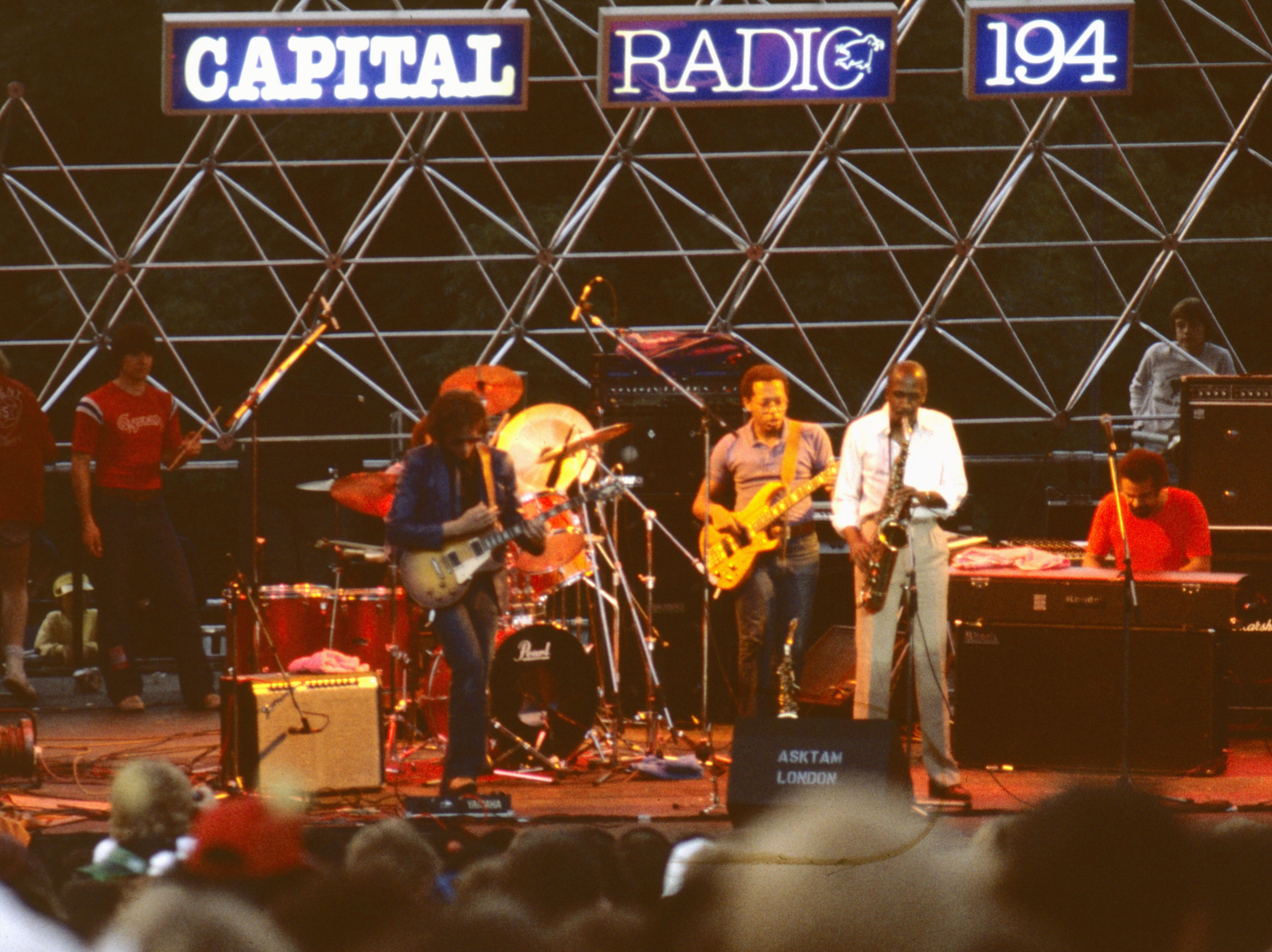
The Crusaders at Knebworth Park, UK, Capital Radio Jazz Festival, 1982

High school friends Joe Sample (piano), Wilton Felder (tenor saxophone) and Nesbert "Stix" Hooper (drums) formed their first band together, the Swingsters, at Wheatley High School in Houston, Texas in 1954. While studying at Texas Southern University, they played a mixture of jazz and R&B, and were joined by Wayne Henderson (trombone), Hubert Laws (flute), and Henry Wilson (bass). The group soon turned more to hard bop, and renamed themselves the Modern Jazz Sextet, but also recorded in a more R&B vein as the Nighthawks (or Nite Hawks).

In 1960, Sample, Felder, Hooper and Henderson moved to Los Angeles and formed the Jazz Crusaders as a quintet with a succession of different bass players. Influenced by musicians such as Cannonball Adderley, Art Blakey and John Coltrane, the band signed to the Pacific Jazz label in 1961, and released 16 albums on the label over the subsequent eight years. With a front-line horn section of Felder and Henderson, the group's sound was rooted in hard bop, but with a slant towards R&B and soul music.

Their first two albums, with Jimmy Bond on bass, were Freedom Sound (1961), and Lookin' Ahead (1962), followed by the live album At the Lighthouse (1962) and Tough Talk, the first of several albums with bassist Bobby Haynes. In all, the group recorded five live albums in the 1960s, four of which were recorded at the Lighthouse Café in Hermosa Beach. They also had their first chart entry, their treatment of Stevie Wonder's "Uptight (Everything's Alright)" reaching No. 95 on the Hot 100 in 1966. The group's 1969 album, Powerhouse, was their first to reach the Billboard 200 album chart, reaching No. 184, and was also their last studio album for Pacific Jazz.

The group then signed with the Chisa label, co-owned by trumpeter Hugh Masekela and producer Stewart Levine. Their 1970 album Old Socks, New Shoes reached No. 90 on the album chart, and was their last as the Jazz Crusaders. The decision was taken to call the group simply the Crusaders, so as not to limit their scope and potential audience. After a second album with Chisa, (Pass the Plate, 1971), and one album for the MoWest label (Hollywood, 1972) they signed with Blue Thumb Records, where they remained until the late 1970s. The Crusaders released the album Crusaders 1 in 1972, including "Put It Where You Want It", covered by the Average White Band in 1973. Their recordings increasingly adopted a jazz-funk style. They incorporated electric guitar and bass into their shows and recordings, as well as using Sample's electric piano and clavinet. Guitarist Larry Carlton joined and featured on their albums in the early part of the decade. Bass duties were often handled by Felder, with Max Bennett contributing in the early/mid-70's and Robert "Pops" Popwell joining later in the decade.

According to jazz critic Scott Yanow at AllMusic, however, "after a few excellent albums during the early part of the decade... the group began to decline in quality." Sample later commented that the group was under commercial pressure from record companies to record jazzed-up versions of contemporary popular songs. Henderson left to become a record producer in 1975, and the other musicians regularly and increasingly worked as session musicians with artists such as the Jackson 5, Marvin Gaye, Joni Mitchell, Steely Dan, and Randy Newman. With a growing crossover appeal, the group's most commercially successful recordings included the single "Put It Where You Want It" (No. 52 pop, 1972), and the albums The 2nd Crusade (No. 45 album, 1973), Southern Comfort (No. 31 album, 1974) including "Stomp and Buck Dance", Chain Reaction (No. 26 album, 1975), Those Southern Knights (No. 38 album, 1976), and Images (No. 34 album, 1978).

The peak of the group's commercial success came with 1979's Street Life, with Randy Crawford as featured singer. The album peaked at No. 18 on the pop album charts and the title track made the top 10 on the R&B chart, No. 36 on Billboard′s Hot 100 chart, and No. 5 in the UK. Later albums by the group featured singers Bill Withers and Joe Cocker. The live 1982 album Royal Jam featured guitarist B. B. King, bassist James Jamerson, and the Royal Philharmonic Orchestra. Hooper left in 1983, and though Felder and Sample kept the group operating through the 1980s, the group's commercial success diminished.

Felder and Henderson reunited in the mid-1990s as the Crusaders. Henderson later led a band called the Jazz Crusaders, in which Felder and Carlton also played, and Felder and Sample reunited as the Crusaders in 2003.

Wayne Henderson died in Culver City, California on April 5, 2014; Joe Sample died in Houston, Texas on September 12, 2014; and Wilton Felder died in Whittier, California on September 27, 2015.

== Accolades ==
=== Grammy awards ===
The Grammy Awards are awarded annually by the National Academy of Recording Arts and Sciences. The Crusaders have received a total of nine nominations.

Year	Category	Nominated work	Result
1972	Best R&B Instrumental Performance	Crusaders 1	Nominated
1973	Best R&B Instrumental Performance	The 2nd Crusade	Nominated
1974	Best R&B Instrumental Performance	Scratch	Nominated
1976	Best R&B Instrumental Performance	"Keep That Same Old Feeling"	Nominated
1978	Best R&B Instrumental Performance	Images	Nominated
1981	Best Inspirational Performance	"I'm So Glad I'm Standing Here Today"	Nominated
1982	Best R&B Performance By A Duo Or Group With Vocal	"Street Life"	Nominated
1984	Best R&B Instrumental Performance	Ghetto Blaster	Nominated
2003	Best Contemporary Jazz Album	Rural Renewal	Nominated

== Discography ==
=== As the Jazz Crusaders ===
- Freedom Sound (Pacific Jazz, 1961)
- Lookin' Ahead (Pacific Jazz, 1962)
- The Jazz Crusaders at the Lighthouse (Pacific Jazz, 1962)
- Tough Talk (Pacific Jazz, 1963)
- Heat Wave (Pacific Jazz, 1963)
- Jazz Waltz with Les McCann (Pacific Jazz, 1963)
- Stretchin' Out (Pacific Jazz, 1964)
- The Thing (Pacific Jazz, 1965)
- Chile Con Soul (Pacific Jazz, 1965)
- Live at the Lighthouse '66 (Pacific Jazz, 1966)
- Talk That Talk (Pacific Jazz, 1966)
- The Festival Album (Pacific Jazz, 1966)
- Uh Huh (Pacific Jazz, 1967)
- Lighthouse '68 (Pacific Jazz, 1968)
- Powerhouse (Pacific Jazz, 1969)
- Lighthouse '69 (Pacific Jazz, 1969)
- Give Peace a Chance (Liberty, 1970)
- Old Socks New Shoes – New Socks Old Shoes (Chisa, 1970)

=== As the Crusaders ===
- Pass the Plate (Chisa, 1971) – No. 168 US
- Hollywood (MoWest, 1972)
- Crusaders 1 (Blue Thumb, 1972) – No. 96 US
- The 2nd Crusade (Blue Thumb, 1973)
- Unsung Heroes (Blue Thumb, 1973)
- Scratch (Blue Thumb, 1974)
- Southern Comfort (Blue Thumb, 1974)
- Chain Reaction (Blue Thumb, 1975)
- Those Southern Knights (Blue Thumb, 1976)
- Best of The Crusaders (Blue Thumb, 1976)
- Free as the Wind (Blue Thumb, 1977)
- Images (Blue Thumb, 1978)
- Street Life (MCA, 1979)
- Rhapsody and Blues (MCA, 1980)
- Ongaku Kai – Live in Japan (Crusaders, 1981; GRP, 1993)
- Standing Tall (MCA, 1981)
- Royal Jam (MCA, 1982) – with B.B. King and the Royal Philharmonic Orchestra
- Ghetto Blaster (MCA, 1984)
- The Good and Bad Times (MCA, 1986)
- Life in the Modern World (MCA, 1988)
- Healing the Wounds (GRP, 1991)
- Rural Renewal (Verve, 2003)
- Live in Japan 2003 (P.R.A., 2004)

=== As the Jazz Crusaders ===
n.b. (Wayne Henderson and Wilton Felder)

- Happy Again (Sin-Drome, 1994)
- Louisiana Hot Sauce (Sin-Drome, 1996)
- Break'n Da Rulz! (Indigo Blue, 1998)
- Power of Our Music – The Endangered Species (Indigo Blue, 2000)
- Soul Axess (Indigo Blue, 2003)
- Alive in South Africa (True Life, 2006)

== See also ==
- Bill Withers
- Randy Crawford
