= Stix Hooper =

American drummer (born 1938)

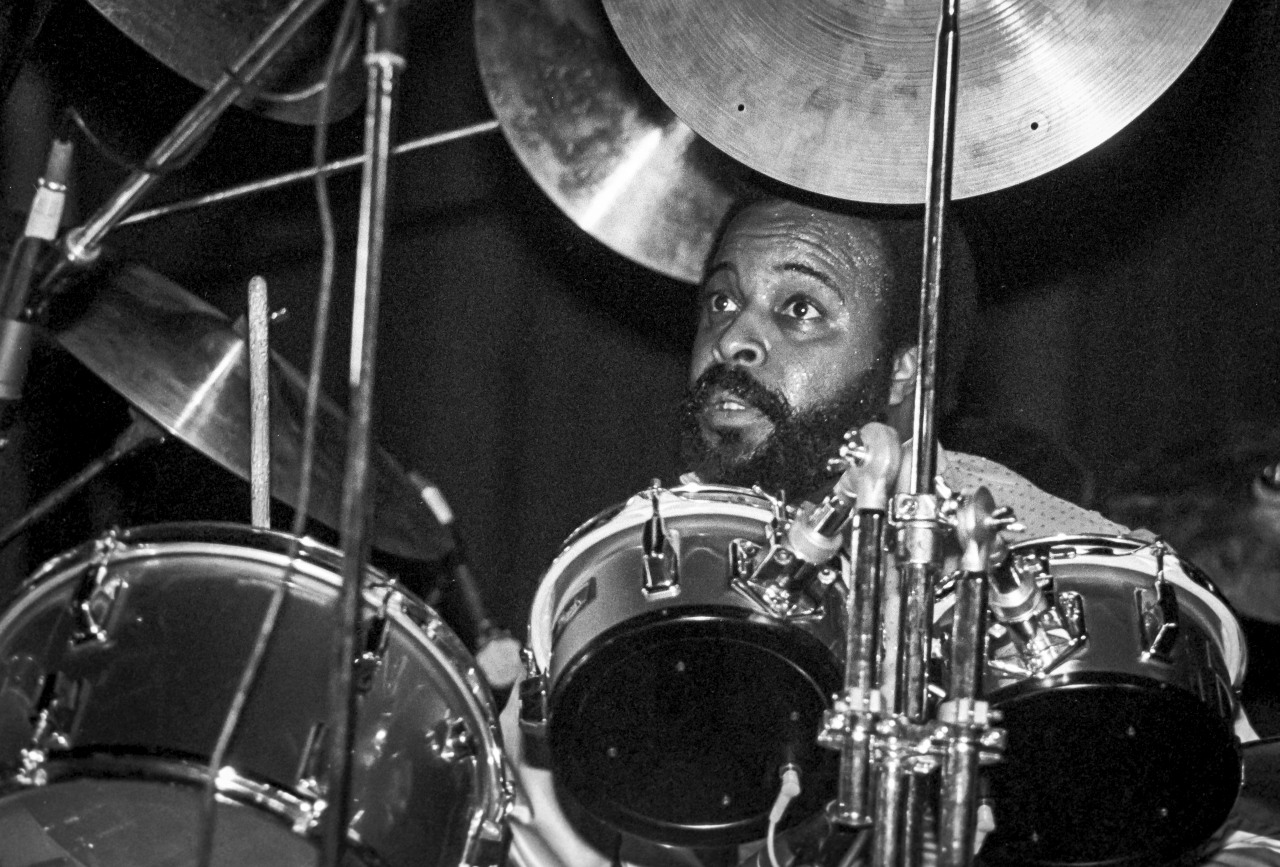
- Stix Hooper in 1980

Background information
- Born: Nesbert Hooper; 15 August 1938 (age 88); Houston, Texas, U.S.
- Genres: Jazz fusion, smooth jazz, crossover jazz, jazz
- Occupation: Musician
- Instrument: Drums
- Years active: 1950s–present

Nesbert "Stix" Hooper (born August 15, 1938) is an American drummer and founding member of The Crusaders.

== Career ==
Hooper developed an interest in music, drums, and percussion at an early age. Starting in middle school with band director George Magruder, he began devoting much of his time to the study of music.

While he was a student at Wheatley High School (Houston), he formed the band the Swingsters and then the Modern Jazz Sextet with pianist Joe Sample and saxophonist Wilton Felder. At Texas Southern University, he received coaching from members of the Houston Symphony Orchestra and other local professional musicians while continuing to play with Sample, Felder, and new band members like trombonist Wayne Henderson. He then left Houston with Sample, Felder, and Henderson to form the Jazz Crusaders in Los Angeles. After moving to the west coast, he studied music at California State University, Los Angeles and with private instructors and mentors.

He has worked with Arthur Fiedler, George Shearing, B. B. King, Grant Green, Grover Washington Jr., Quincy Jones, Marvin Gaye, Nancy Wilson, the Royal Philharmonic Orchestra of London, and the Rolling Stones. He was National Vice Chairman of the National Academy of Recording Arts and Sciences and president of its Los Angeles chapter.

== Discography ==
=== As leader ===
- The World Within (MCA 3180, 1979)
- Touch the Feeling (MCA 5374, 1982)
- Lay it on the Line (Artful Balance 7214, 1989)
- Many Hats (Stix Hooper Enterprises SHE3001, 2010)
- Jazz Gems (Stix Hooper Enterprises SHE3002, 2010)
- Mainstream Straight-Ahead (Stix Hooper Enterprises SHE3003, 2010)
- Live in L.A. (Stix Hooper Enterprises SHE3006, 2015)
- We Went West (Stix Hooper Enterprises SHE3007, 2015)
- Friends Across the Pond (A Tribute to the George Shearing Quintet) (Stix Hooper Enterprises SHE3008, 2016)
- Orchestrally Speaking (Stix Hooper Enterprises SHE3009, 2022)

With The Crusaders

- Freedom Sound (Pacific Jazz, 1961)
- Lookin' Ahead (Pacific Jazz, 1962)
- The Jazz Crusaders at the Lighthouse (Pacific Jazz, 1962)
- Tough Talk (Pacific Jazz, 1963)
- Heat Wave (Pacific Jazz, 1963)
- Jazz Waltz (Pacific Jazz, 1963) with Les McCann
- Stretchin' Out (Pacific Jazz, 1964)
- The Thing (Pacific Jazz, 1965)
- Chile Con Soul (Pacific Jazz, 1965)
- Live at the Lighthouse '66 (Pacific Jazz, 1966)
- Talk That Talk (Pacific Jazz, 1966)
- The Festival Album (Pacific Jazz, 1966)
- Uh Huh (Pacific Jazz, 1967)
- Lighthouse '68 (Pacific Jazz, 1968)
- Powerhouse (Pacific Jazz, 1969)
- Lighthouse '69 (Pacific Jazz, 1969)
- Give Peace a Chance (Liberty, 1970)
- Old Socks New Shoes – New Socks Old Shoes (Chisa, 1970)
- Pass the Plate (Chisa, 1971)
- Hollywood (MoWest, 1972)
- Crusaders 1 (Blue Thumb, 1972)
- The 2nd Crusade (Blue Thumb, 1973)
- Unsung Heroes (Blue Thumb, 1973)
- Scratch (Blue Thumb, 1974)
- Southern Comfort (Blue Thumb, 1974)
- Chain Reaction (Blue Thumb, 1975)
- Those Southern Knights (Blue Thumb, 1976)
- Free as the Wind (Blue Thumb, 1977)
- Images (Blue Thumb, 1978)
- Street Life (MCA, 1979)
- Rhapsody and Blues (MCA, 1980)
- Standing Tall (MCA, 1981)
- Royal Jam (MCA, 1982)
- Rural Renewal (Verve, 2003)

=== As sideman ===
With Joe Sample

- 1978 Rainbow Seeker
- 1979 Carmel
- 1980 Voices in the Rain

With others

- 1969 Back to the Roots, Kay Starr
- 1969 Here Comes Shuggie Otis, Shuggie Otis
- 1971 The Heart and Soul of Joe Williams and George Shearing, Joe Williams and George Shearing (Sheba)
- 1971 Head On, Bobby Hutcherson
- 1971 Shades of Green, Grant Green
- 1973 I Know I Love Him, Nancy Wilson
- 1973 Playing/Singing, Larry Carlton
- 1974 Light, Airy and Swinging, George Shearing
- 1974 I Am Not Afraid, Hugh Masekela
- 1975 Home Brew, Arthur Adams
- 1978 Midnight Believer, B. B. King
- 1979 Take It Home, B. B. King
- 1980 Now We May Begin, Randy Crawford
- 1989 Let's Stay Together, Eric Gale
- 1989 Times Are Changin', Freddie Hubbard
- 2003 New York, New Sound, Gerald Wilson (Mack Avenue)

=== As songwriter ===
- Greasy Spoon (1974)
- When There's Love Around (1974)
