= Wayne Henderson (musician) =

American jazz trombonist (1939–2014)

Background information
- Born: Wayne Maurice Henderson; September 24, 1939; Houston, Texas, U.S.
- Died: April 5, 2014 (aged 74) Culver City, California, U.S.
- Genres: Jazz fusion, jazz, crossover jazz, soul jazz
- Occupations: Musician, record producer
- Instrument: Trombone
- Formerly of: The Jazz Crusaders, The Crusaders

Wayne Maurice Henderson (September 24, 1939 – April 5, 2014) was an American jazz fusion and soul jazz trombonist and record producer. In 1961, he co-founded the soul jazz/jazz fusion group The Jazz Crusaders. Henderson left the group (who by then had changed their name to The Crusaders) in 1976 to pursue a career in producing, but revived The Jazz Crusaders in 1995.

In 2007, Henderson took a position with the California College of Music in Pasadena, California.

Henderson had suffered from diabetes and died of heart failure at a Culver City hospital on April 5, 2014, at age 74.

== Discography ==
=== As leader/co-leader ===
- 1968: The Freedom Sounds fest. Wayne Henderson People Get Ready (Atlantic)
- 1969: The Freedom Sounds fest. Wayne Henderson Soul Sound System (Atlantic)
- 1977: At Big Daddies (ABC)
- 1977: Big Daddy's Place (ABC)
- 1978: Living on a Dream (Polydor)
- 1978: Step in to Our Life (Polydor)(with Roy Ayers)
- 1979: Emphasized (Polydor)
- 1980: Roy Ayers/Wayne Henderson Prime Time (Polydor)
- 1992: "Back To The Groove" (PAR 2013 CD) "Wayne Henderson And The Next Crusade"
- 1993: Sketches of Life - Wayne Henderson & The Next Crusade
- 2003: Rosa Cafe (Charly)

=== With The Jazz Crusaders ===
- Freedom Sound (Pacific Jazz, 1961)
- Lookin' Ahead (Pacific Jazz, 1962)
- The Jazz Crusaders at the Lighthouse (Pacific Jazz, 1962)
- Tough Talk (Pacific Jazz, 1963)
- Heat Wave (Pacific Jazz, 1963)
- Jazz Waltz (Pacific Jazz, 1963) with Les McCann
- Stretchin' Out (Pacific Jazz, 1964)
- The Thing (Pacific Jazz, 1965)
- Chile Con Soul (Pacific Jazz, 1965)
- Live at the Lighthouse '66 (Pacific Jazz, 1966)
- Talk That Talk (Pacific Jazz, 1966)
- The Festival Album (Pacific Jazz, 1966)
- Uh Huh (Pacific Jazz, 1967)
- Lighthouse '68 (Pacific Jazz, 1968)
- Powerhouse (Pacific Jazz, 1969)
- Lighthouse '69 (Pacific Jazz, 1969)
- Give Peace a Chance (Liberty, 1970)
- Old Socks New Shoes – New Socks Old Shoes (Chisa, 1970)

=== With The Crusaders ===
- Pass the Plate (Chisa, 1971)
- Hollywood (MoWest, 1972)
- Crusaders 1 (Blue Thumb, 1972)
- The 2nd Crusade (Blue Thumb, 1973)
- Unsung Heroes (Blue Thumb, 1973)
- Scratch (Blue Thumb, 1974)
- Southern Comfort (Blue Thumb, 1974)
- Chain Reaction (Blue Thumb, 1975)
- Those Southern Knights (Blue Thumb, 1976)

=== As songwriter ===
- Stomp and Buck Dance (Blue Thumb, 1974)
- Super-Stuff (Blue Thumb, 1974)

=== As producer ===
With Wilton Felder

- 1969 Bullitt (Pacific Jazz)

With Monk Montgomery

- 1969: It's Never Too Late
- 1971: Bass Odyssey

With Ronnie Laws

- 1975: Pressure Sensitive (Blue Note)

With Caldera

- 1976 Caldera (album) (Capitol)

With Pleasure

- 1975 Dust Yourself Off (Fantasy)
- 1976 Accept No Substitutes (Fantasy)
- 1977 Joyous (Fantasy)

With Gábor Szabó

- 1977: Faces (Mercury)
