= Joe Sample =

American jazz musician and composer (1939–2014)

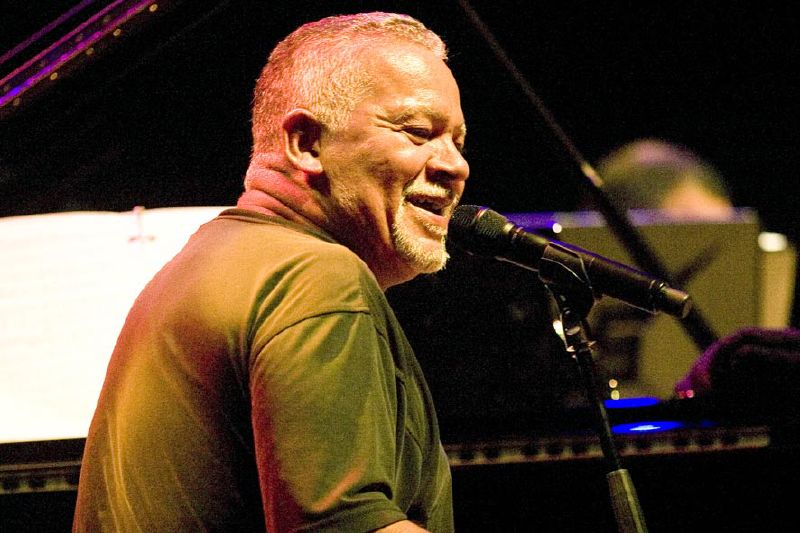
- Sample in 2008

Background information
- Born: Joseph Leslie Sample; February 1, 1939; Houston, Texas, U.S.
- Died: September 12, 2014 (aged 75) Houston, Texas, U.S.
- Genres: Jazz fusion, soul jazz, crossover jazz, jazz
- Occupations: Musician, composer, songwriter
- Instruments: Keyboards, vocals
- Years active: 1950s–2014
- Labels: Blue Thumb, MCA, GRP, Warner Bros., Verve, ABC

Joseph Leslie Sample (February 1, 1939 – September 12, 2014) was an American jazz keyboardist and composer. He was one of the founding members of The Jazz Crusaders in 1960, whose name was shortened to "The Crusaders" in 1971. He remained a part of the group until its final album in 1991, and also the 2003 reunion album Rural Renewal.

Beginning in the late 1960s, he saw a successful solo career and guested on several recordings by other acts, including Miles Davis, George Benson, Jimmy Witherspoon, Michael Franks, B. B. King, Eric Clapton, Steely Dan, Joni Mitchell, Anita Baker, Herb Alpert, and The Supremes. Sample incorporated gospel, blues, jazz, latin, and classical forms into his music.

== Biography ==
Sample was born in Houston, Texas, the youngest son of Alexander Sample, a mail-carrier, and Agatha (née Osborne) Sample, a seamstress. Sample began to play the piano at the age of five. He was a student of the organist and pianist (Theodore or T.) Curtis Mayo.

In high school in the 1950s, Sample teamed up with friends saxophonist Wilton Felder and drummer "Stix" Hooper to form a group called the Swingsters. While studying piano at Texas Southern University, Sample met and added trombonist Wayne Henderson and several other players to the Swingsters, which became the Modern Jazz Sextet and then the Jazz Crusaders, in emulation of one of the leading progressive jazz bands of the day, Art Blakey's Jazz Messengers. Sample never took a degree from the university; instead, in 1960, he and the Jazz Crusaders made the move from Houston to Los Angeles. He was a member of Phi Beta Sigma fraternity.

The group quickly found opportunities on the West Coast, making its first recording, Freedom Sound, in 1961 and releasing up to four albums a year over much of the 1960s. The Jazz Crusaders played at first in the dominant hard bop style of the day, standing out by virtue of their unusual front-line combination of saxophone (played by Wilton Felder) and Henderson's trombone. Another distinctive quality was the funky, rhythmically appealing acoustic piano playing of Sample, who helped steer the group's sound into a fusion between jazz and soul in the late 1960s. The Jazz Crusaders became a strong concert draw during those years.

While Sample and his bandmates continued to work together, he and the other band members pursued individual work as well. In 1969, Sample made his first recording under his own name; Fancy Dance featured the pianist as part of a jazz trio. In the 1970s, as the Jazz Crusaders became simply the Crusaders and branched out into popular sounds, Sample became known as a Los Angeles studio musician, appearing on recordings by Joni Mitchell, Marvin Gaye, Miles Davis, B. B. King, Randy Crawford, George Benson, Joe Cocker, Herb Alpert, Michael Franks, Anita Baker (1994) and Steely Dan. Sample was a founding member of the L.A. Express, which was started as the backing band for Tom Scott; however, both Sample and fellow Crusader Larry Carlton left after that group's first album. In 1975, Sample went into the studio with bassist Ray Brown and drummer Shelly Manne to produce a then state-of-the-art recording direct to disc titled The Three. About this time, Blue Note Records reissued some of the early work by the Jazz Crusaders as The Young Rabbits. This was a compilation of their recordings produced between 1962 and 1968.

The electric keyboard was fairly new in the 1960s, and Sample became one of the instrument's pioneers. He began to use the electric piano while the group retained their original name, and the group hit a commercial high-water mark with the hit single "Street Life" and the album of the same name in 1979. He released Swing Street Café with R&B guitarist David T. Walker in 1981.

The Crusaders, after losing several key members, broke up after recording Life in the Modern World for the GRP label in 1987. Despite the disbanding of the Crusaders, the members would join each other to record periodically over the years, releasing Healing the Wounds in the early 1990s. Felder, Hooper, and Sample recorded their first album, called Rural Renewal, as the reunited Crusaders group in 2003 and played a concert in Japan in 2004.

After Sample's Fancy Dance (1969), he recorded several solo albums, including Sample This, produced by George Duke.

GRP also released Joe Sample Collection, and a three-disc Crusaders Collection, as testament to Sample's enduring legacy. Some of the pianist's recent recordings are The Song Lives On (1999), featuring duets with singer Lalah Hathaway, and The Pecan Tree (2002), a tribute to his hometown of Houston, where he relocated in 1994. His 2004 album on Verve, Soul Shadows, paid tribute to Duke Ellington and Jelly Roll Morton, and pre-jazz bandleader James Reese Europe. In 2007, he recorded Feeling Good with vocalist Randy Crawford. In the mid-1970s, the Crusaders added guitarist Larry Carlton.

Sample appeared on stage at the Waterfront Hall in Belfast, Northern Ireland, on 28 May 2000, playing keyboard solo on George Benson's "Deeper Than You Think". This concert was recorded and a DVD entitled George Benson: Absolutely Live was subsequently released. A studio version of "Deeper Than You Think" was recorded featuring Joe Sample in New York in May 1999 during sessions for a Benson collection that took the title Absolute Benson.

Some of Sample's works were featured on The Weather Channel's "Local on the 8s" segments and his song "Rainbow Seeker" is included in their 2008 compilation release, The Weather Channel Presents: Smooth Jazz II. Nicole Kidman sang his song "One Day I'll Fly Away" in the Baz Luhrmann film Moulin Rouge! (2001). The popular "In All My Wildest Dreams", also from the 1978 album Rainbow Seeker, was sampled on Tupac's "Dear Mama", De La Soul's "WRMS's Dedication to the Bitty", Toni Braxton's "What's Good" and Arrested Development's "Africa's Inside Me".

Sample died of mesothelioma in Houston, Texas, at the age of 75. At the time of his death, Sample had been working on a project, "Quadroon," with singer-songwriter Jonatha Brooke.

== Personal life ==
Joe Sample was Catholic, and supported Catholic charities and churches throughout his life.

His son, bassist Nicklas Sample, was a member of the Coryell Auger Sample Trio featuring Julian Coryell and Karma Auger.

== Discography ==
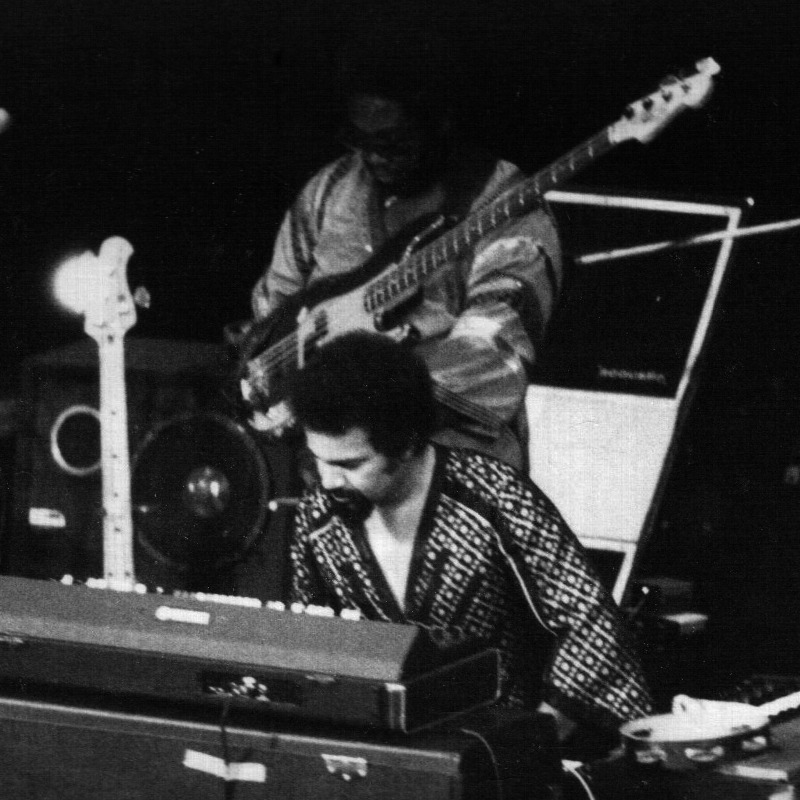
Sample performing in Paris, 1978

=== As leader ===
Title	Year	Label
Fancy Dance [originally titled Try Us]	1969	Gazell
The Three (with Ray Brown, Shelly Manne)	1976	East Wind
Rainbow Seeker	1978	ABC/MCA; Blue Thumb
Carmel	1979	ABC/MCA; Blue Thumb
Voices in the Rain	1981	MCA Jazz
Swing Street Cafe (with David T. Walker)	1981	Crusaders; Verve
The Hunter	1983	MCA Jazz
Oasis	1985	MCA Jazz
Roles	1987	MCA Jazz
Spellbound	1989	Warner Bros.
Ashes to Ashes	1990	Warner Bros.
Invitation	1993	Warner Bros.
Did You Feel That?	1994	Warner Bros.
Old Places Old Faces	1996	Warner Bros.
Sample This	1997	Warner Bros.
The Song Lives On (with Lalah Hathaway)	1999	GRP
The Pecan Tree	2002	Verve
Soul Shadows	2004	Verve
Creole Love Call (with Nils Landgren)	2006	ACT
Feeling Good (with Randy Crawford & Steve Gadd)	2007	PRA
No Regrets (with Randy Crawford & Steve Gadd)	2009	PRA
Live (with Randy Crawford, Steve Gadd & Nicklas Sample)	2012	PRA
Children of the Sun (with NDR Big band & Steve Gadd)	2014	PRA
Christmas with Friends (with India Arie)	2015	Motown

=== With The (Jazz) Crusaders ===
- Freedom Sound (Pacific Jazz, 1961)
- Lookin' Ahead (Pacific Jazz, 1962)
- The Jazz Crusaders at the Lighthouse (Pacific Jazz, 1962)
- Tough Talk (Pacific Jazz, 1963)
- Heat Wave (Pacific Jazz, 1963)
- Jazz Waltz (Pacific Jazz, 1963) with Les McCann
- Stretchin' Out (Pacific Jazz, 1964)
- The Thing (Pacific Jazz, 1965)
- Chile Con Soul (Pacific Jazz, 1965)
- Live at the Lighthouse '66 (Pacific Jazz, 1966)
- Talk That Talk (Pacific Jazz, 1966)
- The Festival Album (Pacific Jazz, 1966)
- Uh Huh (Pacific Jazz, 1967)
- Lighthouse '68 (Pacific Jazz, 1968)
- Powerhouse (Pacific Jazz, 1969)
- Lighthouse '69 (Pacific Jazz, 1969)
- Give Peace a Chance (Liberty, 1970)
- Old Socks New Shoes – New Socks Old Shoes (Chisa, 1970)
- Pass the Plate (Chisa, 1971)
- Hollywood (MoWest, 1972)
- Crusaders 1 (Blue Thumb, 1972)
- The 2nd Crusade (Blue Thumb, 1973)
- Unsung Heroes (Blue Thumb, 1973)
- Scratch (Blue Thumb, 1974)
- Southern Comfort (Blue Thumb, 1974)
- Chain Reaction (ABC/Blue Thumb, 1975)
- Those Southern Knights (ABC/Blue Thumb, 1976)
- Free as the Wind (ABC/Blue Thumb, 1977)
- Images (ABC/Blue Thumb, 1978)
- Street Life (MCA, 1979)
- Rhapsody and Blues (MCA, 1980)
- Standing Tall (MCA, 1981)
- Ongaku Kai - Live in Japan (Crusaders, 1981; GRP, 1993)
- Royal Jam (MCA, 1982) with B.B. King
- Ghetto Blaster (MCA, 1984)
- The Good and the Bad Times (MCA, 1986)
- Life in the Modern World (MCA, 1988)
- Healing the Wounds (GRP, 1991)
- Rural Renewal (Verve, 2003)

With CreoleJoe Band

- CreoleJoe Band (PRA, 2013)

=== As songwriter ===
- Put It Where Yo Want It (1972)
- Time Bomb (1974)
- Street Life (1979)
- Soul Shadows (1980)

=== As sideman ===
With Anita Baker

- Rhythm of Love (Elektra, 1994)
- Christmas Fantasy (Blue Note, 2005)

With George Benson

- 20/20 (Warner Bros., 1985)
- Absolute Benson (Verve, 2000)
- Guitar Man (Concord, 2011)

With Joan Baez

- Diamonds & Rust (A&M, 1975)
- Blowin' Away (Portrait, 1977)

With Cher

- Bittersweet White Light (MCA, 1973)
- Stars (Warner Bros., 1975)

With Eric Clapton

- Pilgrim (Reprise, 1998)
- Reptile (Reprise, 2001)

With Natalie Cole

- Unforgettable... with Love (Elektra, 1991)
- Ask a Woman Who Knows (Verve, 2002)

With Randy Crawford

- Everything Must Change (Warner Bros., 1976)
- Now We May Begin (Warner Bros., 1980)
- Through the Eyes of Love (Warner Bros., 1992)
- Feeling Good (PRA, 2007)
- No Regrets (PRA, 2009)
- Live (PRA, 2012)

With Michael Franks

- The Art of Tea (Reprise, 1975)
- Sleeping Gypsy (Warner Bros., 1977)

With Albert King

- Albert (Utopia, 1976)
- Truckload of Lovin' (Utopia, 1976)

With B.B. King

- Midnight Believer (ABC, 1978)
- Take It Home (MCA, 1979)
- There Is Always One More Time (MCA, 1991)
- Reflections (MCA, 2003)

With Blue Mitchell

- Blues' Blues (Mainstream, 1972)
- Graffiti Blues (Mainstream, 1973)

With Joni Mitchell

- Court and Spark (Elektra, 1974)
- The Hissing of Summer Lawns (Elektra, 1975)

With Steely Dan

- Aja (ABC 1977)
- Gaucho (MCA, 1980) – rec. 1978–80

With Rod Stewart

- Stardust: The Great American Songbook, Volume III (J, 2004)
- Fly Me to the Moon... The Great American Songbook Volume V (J, 2010)

With Herb Alpert Rise (A&M, 1979)

With others

- Gene Ammons, Free Again (Prestige, 1971)
- Paul Anka, The Painter (United Artists, 1976)
- Herb Alpert, Rise (A&M, 1979)
- David Axelrod, Seriously Deep (Polydor, 1975)
- Bobby Bryant, The Jazz Excursion into "Hair" (Pacific Jazz, 1969)
- Solomon Burke, Electronic Magnetism (MGM, 1971)
- Kenny Burrell, 'Round Midnight (Fantasy, 1972)
- Jerry Butler, Power Of Love (Mercury, 1973)
- Dion DiMucci, Born to Be with You (Phil Spector, 1975)
- Marvin Gaye, Let's Get It On (Motown, 1973)
- Richard "Groove" Holmes, Welcome Home (World Pacific, 1968)
- Bobby Hutcherson, San Francisco (Blue Note, 1971)
- Milt Jackson, Memphis Jackson (Impulse!, 1969)
- Al Jarreau, Tenderness (Reprise, 1994)
- Gloria Jones, Windstorm (Capitol, 1978)
- B.B. King and Eric Clapton, Riding with the King (except tracks 3, 4, 8) (Reprise, 2000)
- Harold Land, The Peace-Maker (Cadet, 1968)
- Melissa Manchester, Don't Cry Out Loud (Arista, 1978)
- Carmen McRae, Can't Hide Love (Blue Note, 1976)
- Martha Reeves, Martha Reeves (MCA, 1974)
- Minnie Riperton, Adventures in Paradise (Epic, 1975)
- The Rippingtons, Welcome to the St. James' Club (GRP, 1990)
- Johnny Rivers, Outside Help (Big Tree, 1977)
- Brenda Russell, Get Here (A&M, 1988) – rec. 1985–87
- Ringo Starr, Stop and Smell the Roses (RCA, 1981)
- Boz Scaggs, Slow Dancer (Columbia, 1974)
- Lalo Schifrin, Enter the Dragon (soundtrack) (Warner Bros., 1973)
- Sonny & Cher, Mama Was a Rock and Roll Singer, Papa Used to Write All Her Songs (MCA, 1973)
- Dusty Springfield, It Begins Again (Mercury, 1978)
- Tina Turner, Private Dancer (Capitol, 1984)
- Stanley Turrentine, Everybody Come On Out (Fantasy, 1976)
- Stanley Turrentine, Do You Have Any Sugar? (Concord Vista, 1999)
