= Wilton Felder =

American saxophone and bass player (1940–2015)

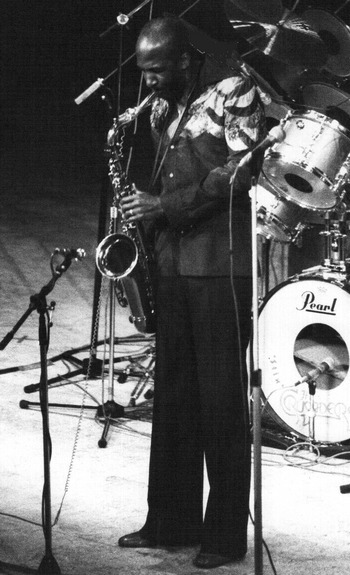
- Felder in 1978

Background information
- Born: Wilton Lewis Felder; August 31, 1940; Houston, Texas, U.S.
- Died: September 27, 2015 (aged 75) Whittier, California, U.S.
- Genres: Jazz fusion; crossover jazz; jazz; soul jazz; smooth jazz
- Occupation: Musician
- Instruments: Saxophone; bass
- Years active: 1959–2015
- Formerly of: The Crusaders; Bobby Womack; David T. Walker; Marvin Gaye
- Spouse: Geraldine Hooper (married N/A - 2015)

Wilton Lewis Felder (August 31, 1940 – September 27, 2015) was an American saxophone and bass player, and is best known as a founding member of the Jazz Crusaders, later known as the Crusaders. Felder played bass on the Jackson 5's hits "I Want You Back", "The Love You Save", and "ABC", and on Marvin Gaye's "Let's Get It On".

== Biography ==
Felder was born on August 31, 1940, in Houston, Texas and studied music at Texas Southern University. Felder, Wayne Henderson, Joe Sample, and Stix Hooper founded their group while in high school in Houston. The Jazz Crusaders evolved from a straight-ahead jazz group into a pioneering jazz-rock fusion band, with a definite soul music influence. Felder worked with the original group for over thirty years, and continued to work in its later versions, which often featured other founding members.

Felder also worked as a West Coast studio musician, mostly playing electric bass, for various soul and R&B musicians, and was one of the in-house bass players for Motown Records, when the record label opened operations in Los Angeles in the early 1970s. He played on recordings by the Jackson 5 such as "I Want You Back", "ABC" and "The Love You Save", as well as recordings by Marvin Gaye including "Let's Get It On" and "I Want You". He also played bass for soft rock groups like Seals and Crofts. Felder played bass on #1 big hit The Hues Corporation's "Rock the Boat" (1974), not James Jamerson. He played on records by many other musicians such as Four Tops Keeper of the Castle (1972), Steely Dan's Pretzel Logic (1974), Joni Mitchell's For the Roses, John Cale's Paris 1919, Billy Joel's Piano Man, Randy Newman's Sail Away (1972) and Joan Baez' Diamonds & Rust. Felder also contributed to albums from Grant Green and Michael Franks. He released the album "Inherit the Wind" with Bobby Womack in 1980.

His album Secrets, which prominently featured Bobby Womack on vocals, reached No. 77 in the UK Albums Chart in 1985. The album featured the minor hit, "(No Matter How High I Get) I'll Still be Looking Up to You", sung by Womack and Alltrinna Grayson.

Felder died in 2015 at his home in Whittier, California from multiple myeloma. He was 75.

== Discography ==
=== As leader/co-leader ===
- Bullitt (Pacific Jazz, 1969)
- We All Have a Star (MCA, 1978)
- Inherit the Wind (MCA, 1980)
- Gentle Fire (MCA, 1983)
- Secrets (MCA, 1985)
- Love Is a Rush (MCA, 1987)
- Nocturnal Moods (PAR, 1991)
- Forever, Always (PAR, 1992)
- Lets Spend Some Time (BCS, 2005)

With The (Jazz) Crusaders

- Freedom Sound (Pacific Jazz, 1961)
- Lookin' Ahead (Pacific Jazz, 1962)
- The Jazz Crusaders at the Lighthouse (Pacific Jazz, 1962)
- Tough Talk (Pacific Jazz, 1963)
- Heat Wave (Pacific Jazz, 1963)
- Jazz Waltz (Pacific Jazz, 1963) with Les McCann
- Stretchin' Out (Pacific Jazz, 1964)
- The Thing (Pacific Jazz, 1965)
- Chile Con Soul (Pacific Jazz, 1965)
- Live at the Lighthouse '66 (Pacific Jazz, 1966)
- Talk That Talk (Pacific Jazz, 1966)
- The Festival Album (Pacific Jazz, 1966)
- Uh Huh (Pacific Jazz, 1967)
- Lighthouse '68 (Pacific Jazz, 1968)
- Powerhouse (Pacific Jazz, 1969)
- Lighthouse '69 (Pacific Jazz, 1969)
- Pass the Plate (Chisa Records, 1971)
- Scratch (Blue Thumb Records, 1974)

=== As sideman ===
With Joan Baez

- Diamonds & Rust (A&M, 1975)
- Blowin' Away (Portrait, 1977)

With Four Tops

- Keeper of the Castle (Dunhill, 1972)
- Main Street People (Dunhill, 1973)
- Meeting of the Minds (Dunhill, 1974)
- Four Tops Live & In Concert ( ABC Dunhill, 1974)

With Donald Byrd

- Ethiopian Knights (Blue Note, 1972)

With Donovan

- Slow Down World (Epic, 1976)
- Lady of the Stars (RCA, 1984)

With Jackson Browne

- For Everyman (Asylum, 1973)

With John Cale

- Paris 1919 (Reprise, 1972)

With Michael Franks

- The Art of Tea (Reprise, 1976)
- Sleeping Gypsy (Warner Bros., 1977)

With Marvin Gaye

- Let's Get It On (Tamla, 1973)
- I Want You (Motown, 1976)

With Dizzy Gillespie

- Free Ride (Pablo, 1977) composed and arranged by Lalo Schifrin

With Grant Green

- Shades of Green (Blue Note, 1971)
- Live at The Lighthouse (Blue Note, 1972)

With Richard "Groove" Holmes

- Welcome Home (Pacific Jazz, 1968)

With The Hues Corporation

- Freedom For The Stallion (RCA Victor, 1973)

With Ronnie Laws

- Pressure Sensitive (Blue Note, 1975)

With Joni Mitchell

- For the Roses (Asylum, 1972)
- Court and Spark (Asylum, 1974)
- The Hissing of Summer Lawns (Asylum, 1975)

With Randy Newman

- Sail Away (Reprise, 1972)

With B.B. King

- Midnight Believer (ABC, 1978)
- Take It Home (ABC, 1979)

With Harry Nilsson

- Flash Harry (Mercury, 1980)

With Jennifer Warnes

- Jennifer (Reprise, 1972)

With Milt Jackson

- Memphis Jackson (Impulse!, 1969)

With Tina Turner

- Private Dancer (Capitol, 1984)

With John Klemmer

- Constant Throb (Impulse!, 1971)
- Waterfalls (Impulse!, 1972)
- Magic and Movement (Impulse!, 1974)

With Charles Kynard

- Reelin' with the Feelin' (Prestige, 1969)

With Minnie Riperton

- Stay in Love (Epic, 1977)

With Ringo Starr

- Stop and Smell the Roses (RCA, 1981)

With Carmen McRae

- Can't Hide Love (Blue Note, 1976)

With Billy Joel

- Piano Man (Columbia, 1973)
- Streetlife Serenade (Columbia, 1974)

With Randy Crawford

- Now We May Begin (Warner Bros., 1980)

With Shuggie Otis

- Here Comes Shuggie Otis (Epic, 1970)
- Freedom Flight (Epic, 1971)

With Dusty Springfield

- Cameo (ABC, 1973)

With Jean-Luc Ponty

- King Kong: Jean-Luc Ponty Plays the Music of Frank Zappa (World Pacific/Liberty, 1970)

With Seals & Crofts

- Summer Breeze (Warner Bros., 1972)
- Diamond Girl (Warner Bros., 1973)
- I'll Play for You (Warner Bros., 1975)
- Get Closer (Warner Bros., 1976)
- Sudan Village (Warner Bros., 1976)

With Jimmy Smith

- Root Down Live! (Verve, 1972)

With Steely Dan

- Pretzel Logic (ABC, 1974)
- Katy Lied (ABC, 1975)

With Gerald Wilson

- California Soul (Pacific Jazz, 1968)

With Hugh Masekela

- Reconstruction (Chisa, 1970)
