= Randy Crawford discography =

This is the discography for the American jazz singer Randy Crawford.

== Albums ==
=== Studio albums ===
Year	Album	Peak chart positions										Certifications	Record label
Year	Album	US	US R&B	US Jazz	US Cont Jazz	AUS	GER	NL	NOR	NZ	UK	Certifications	Record label
1976	Everything Must Change	—	—	—	—	—	—	—	—	—	—		Warner Bros.
1977	Miss Randy Crawford	—	—	—	—	—	—	—	—	—	—		Warner Bros.
1979	Raw Silk	—	63	35	—	—	—	—	37	—	—		Warner Bros.
1980	Now We May Begin	180	30	14	—	40	—	4	31	—	10	NVPI: Gold; BPI: Silver	Warner Bros.
1981	Secret Combination	71	12	9	—	51	—	5	6	34	2	ARIA: Gold; BPI: 2× Platinum	Warner Bros.
1982	Windsong	148	24	16	—	20	—	6	3	36	7	BPI: Silver	Warner Bros.
1983	Nightline	164	41	24	—	—	—	30	4	—	37		Warner Bros.
1986	Abstract Emotions	178	53	—	—	74	—	52	10	—	14	BPI: Silver	Warner Bros.
1989	Rich and Poor	159	19	—	4	91	—	48	3	—	63		Warner Bros.
1992	Through the Eyes of Love	—	49	—	8	113	57	92	1	—	—		Warner Bros.
1993	Don't Say It's Over	—	—	—	—	121	—	—	13	—	—		Warner Bros.
1995	Naked and True	—	40	4	3	132	64	—	39	—	—		Bluemoon/ Atlantic
1998	Every Kind of Mood — Randy, Randi, Randee	—	70	3	2	—	70	—	—	—	—		Bluemoon/ Atlantic
2000	Permanent/Play Mode^{[A]}	—	—	14	9	—	13	—	—	—	—		Warner Bros.
2006	Feeling Good (with Joe Sample)	—	77	3	—	—	44	95	—	—	—		PRA/ EmArcy
2008	No Regrets (with Joe Sample)	—	—	8	—	—	—	—	—	—	—		PRA/ EmArcy
"—" denotes a recording that did not chart or was not released in that territory.

- ^{A} Album was released as Permanent in North America and as Play Mode in the rest of the world.

=== Live albums ===
Year	Album	Peaks	Record label
Year	Album	US Jazz	Record label
1995	Live in Zagreb	—	Crisler/Nicolosi
2012	Live (with Joe Sample, Steve Gadd & Nicklas Sample)	12	PRA
"—" denotes a recording that did not chart or was not released in that territory.

=== Compilation albums ===
Year	Album	Peak chart positions						Certifications	Record label
Year	Album	US Cont Jazz	AUS	GER	NL	NOR	UK	Certifications	Record label
1984	The Greatest Hits	—	—	—	—	—	10	BPI: Gold	K-tel
1985	The Very Best of Randy Crawford	—	—	—	5	—	—		K-tel
1987	The Love Songs	—	35	—	—	—	27	BPI: Gold	Warner Bros./Telstar
1990	The Collection	—	152	—	33	—	—		Warner Bros./Arcade
1993	The Very Best of Randy Crawford	—	23	—	—	—	8	ARIA: Gold	Warner Bros./Dino
1996	Best of Randy Crawford	14	—	—	—	—	—		Warner Bros.
1999	Hits	—	—	52	—	3	—		Warner Bros./WEA
2000	Love Songs - The Very Best of Randy Crawford	—	—	—	—	—	22	BPI: Silver	warner.esp
2000	The Best of Randy Crawford & Friends	—	—	42	—	—	—		WEA
2005	The Ultimate Collection	—	—	—	—	—	31	BPI: Silver	WSM
2011	The Best of Randy Crawford	—	—	—	—	—	7	BPI: Silver	Rhino
"—" denotes a recording that did not chart or was not released in that territory.

== Singles ==
Year	Single	Peak chart positions										Certifications	Album
Year	Single	US	US R&B	US Dan	AUS	GER	IRE	NL	NOR	NZ	UK	Certifications	Album
1972	"Knock on Wood"	—	—	—	—	—	—	—	—	—	—		—N/a
1973	"Don't Get Caught (In Love's Triangle)"	—	—	—	—	—	—	—	—	—	—		—N/a
1977	"I Let You Walk Away"	—	—	—	—	—	—	—	—	—	—		Everything Must Change
1977	"I'm Easy'"	—	—	—	—	—	—	—	—	—	—		Everything Must Change
1977	"Take It Away from Her (Put It on Me)"	—	—	—	—	—	—	—	—	—	—		Miss Randy Crawford
1979	"Endlessly"	—	—	—	—	—	—	—	—	—	—		Raw Silk
1979	"Street Life" (with The Crusaders) ^{[B]}	36	17	75	79	—	14	20	6	—	5		Street Life
1980	"Same Old Story (Same Old Song)"	—	34	—	—	—	—	27	—	—	—		Now We May Begin
1980	"Last Night at Danceland"	—	68	—	—	—	—	—	—	—	61		Now We May Begin
1980	"One Day I'll Fly Away"	—	—	—	29	—	2	1	—	—	2	BPI: Silver	Now We May Begin
1980	"Tender Falls the Rain"	—	—	—	—	—	—	—	—	—	—		Now We May Begin
1981	"People Alone (Love Theme - The Competition)"	—	—	—	—	—	—	27	—	—	—		The Competition
1981	"When I Lose My Way"	—	58	—	—	—	—	—	—	—	—		Secret Combination
1981	"You Might Need Somebody"	—	—	—	—	—	15	—	—	39	11		Secret Combination
1981	"Rainy Night in Georgia"	—	—	—	—	—	25	32	—	—	18		Secret Combination
1981	"Secret Combination"	—	70	—	—	—	—	—	—	—	48		Secret Combination
1981	"Rio de Janeiro Blue"	—	—	—	—	—	—	—	—	—	—		Secret Combination
1982	"Imagine"	108	69	—	36	—	—	—	—	—	60		Casino Lights
1982	"One Hello"	110	50	—	—	—	—	37	—	—	48		Windsong
1982	"Look Who's Lonely Now"	—	68	—	—	—	—	—	—	—	—		Windsong
1982	"Your Precious Love (with Al Jarreau)	102	16	—	—	—	—	—	—	—	—		Casino Lights
1982	"Give Peace a Chance"	—	—	—	—	—	—	—	—	—	—		Windsong (European Edition)
1983	"He Reminds Me"	—	—	—	—	—	—	—	—	—	65		Windsong
1983	"Nightline"	—	29	28	—	—	—	27	—	—	51		Nightline
1983	"Why"	—	—	—	92	—	—	49	—	—	120		Nightline
1984	"Taxi Dancing" (with Rick Springfield)	59	—	—	—	—	—	—	—	—	—		Hard to Hold
1986	"Can't Stand the Pain"	—	58	—	—	—	—	—	—	—	—		Abstract Emotions
1986	"Gettin' Away With Murder"	—	—	—	—	—	—	—	—	—	117		Abstract Emotions
1986	"Desire"	—	90	—	—	—	—	—	—	—	—		Abstract Emotions
1986	"Everybody Needs a Little Rain" (with Gerard Joling)	—	—	—	—	—	—	44	—	—	—		Sea of Love
1986	"Almaz"	—	—	—	—	—	2	—	—	—	4		Abstract Emotions
1987	"Higher Than Anyone Can Count"	—	—	—	—	—	—	—	—	—	104		Abstract Emotions
1989	"Knockin' on Heaven's Door" (with Eric Clapton & David Sanborn)	—	4	—	116	—	—	12	—	2	77		Rich and Poor
1990	"Wrap-U-Up"	—	15	—	—	—	—	—	—	—	—		Rich and Poor
1990	"I Don't Feel Much Like Crying"	—	16	—	—	—	—	—	—	—	—		Rich and Poor
1990	"Cigarette in the Rain"	—	38	—	—	—	—	—	—	—	—		Rich and Poor
1991	"Diamante" (with Zucchero)	—	—	—	—	20	—	—	7	—	44		Through the Eyes of Love
1992	"Who's Crying Now"	—	30	—	175	—	—	—	—	—	—		Through the Eyes of Love
1992	"A Lot That You Can Do"	—	74	—	—	—	—	—	—	—	—		Through the Eyes of Love
1992	"Shine"	—	—	—	—	—	—	—	—	—	—		Through the Eyes of Love
1992	"Rhythm of Romance"	—	—	—	—	—	—	—	—	—	—		Through the Eyes of Love
1993	"Love's Mystery"	—	104	—	—	—	—	—	—	—	—		Don't Say It's Over
1994	"Mad Over You"	—	—	—	—	—	—	—	—	—	—		Don't Say It's Over
1994	"In My Life"	—	—	—	—	—	—	—	—	—	—		Don't Say It's Over
1995	"Forget Me Nots"	—	—	—	—	—	—	—	—	—	—		Naked and True
1995	"Give Me the Night"	—	47	39	—	—	—	—	—	—	60		Naked and True
1996	"Cajun Moon"	—	65	—	—	—	—	—	—	—	—		Naked and True
1996	"All The King's Horses"	—	—	—	—	—	—	—	—	—	—		Naked and True
1997	"Are You Sure?"	—	—	—	—	—	—	—	—	—	—		Every Kind of Mood - Randy, Randi, Randee
1998	"Bye Bye"	—	—	—	—	—	—	—	—	—	—		Every Kind of Mood - Randy, Randi, Randee
1998	"Silence"	—	76	—	—	—	—	—	—	—	—		Every Kind of Mood - Randy, Randi, Randee
1998	"Captain of Her Heart"	—	—	—	—	—	—	—	—	—	—		Every Kind of Mood - Randy, Randi, Randee
1998	"Breaking Down"	—	—	—	—	—	—	—	—	—	—		Every Kind of Mood - Randy, Randi, Randee
1998	"Wishing on a Star"	—	—	14	168	83	—	—	—	—	90		Every Kind of Mood - Randy, Randi, Randee
2000	"I'll Be Around" (with Tiefschwarz)	—	—	—	—	—	—	—	—	—	—		The Best of Randy Crawford & Friends
2000	"Unwounded"	—	—	—	—	—	—	—	—	—	—		The Best of Randy Crawford & Friends
2000	"Merry Go Round"	—	—	—	—	—	—	—	—	—	—		Permanent / Play Mode
2001	"Permanent"	—	—	—	—	—	—	—	—	—	—		Permanent / Play Mode
2001	"Fire & Rain"	—	—	—	—	—	—	—	—	—	—		Permanent / Play Mode
2006	"Feeling Good" (with Joe Sample)	—	—	—	—	—	—	—	—	—	—		Feeling Good
2006	"Rio de Janeiro Blue" (with Joe Sample)	—	—	—	—	—	—	—	—	—	—		Feeling Good
2008	"Angel of the Morning" (with Joe Sample)	—	—	—	—	—	—	—	—	—	—		No Regrets
"—" denotes a recording that did not chart or was not released in that territory.

- ^{B} Crawford sang uncredited lead vocals on "Street Life".

== Guest appearances ==
- Big Man: The Legend of John Henry (1975) by Cannonball Adderley
- Please Don't Touch (1978) by Steve Hackett (One track: "Hoping Love Will Last")
- Zucchero Live at the Kremlin (1991) by Zucchero (Two tracks: "Come Il Sole All'improvviso" and "Imagine")
- Hard to Hold (1984) by Rick Springfield (One track: "Taxi Dancing")
- La Noche (1995) by Presuntos Implicados (One track: "Fallen")
- "Street Life", Album;Street Life, (The Crusaders), MCA Records, 1979
