= The Very Best of Randy Crawford =

Greatest hits album by Randy Crawford
- Released: 1993
- Genre: Jazz; R&B; disco; smooth jazz
- Label: Dino Entertainment; Warner Bros.
- Producer: Wilton Felder; Stephan Goldman; Stewart Levine; Tommy LiPuma; Reggie Lucas; Michael J. Powell; Joe Sample

Randy Crawford chronology
Through the Eyes of Love (1992)	The Very Best of Randy Crawford (1993)	Don't Say It's Over (1993)

Professional ratings
Review scores
Source	Rating
AllMusic	4/5 stars

The Very Best of Randy Crawford is a greatest hits album by American singer Randy Crawford, released in 1993. It contains singles and album tracks from Crawford's studio albums Everything Must Change (1976), Raw Silk (1979), Now We May Begin (1980), Secret Combination (1981), Windsong (1982), Nightline (1983), Abstract Emotions (1986), Rich and Poor (1989) and Through the Eyes of Love (1992), plus one track from the live album Casino Lights (1982) and one track from The Crusaders album Street Life (1979), on which Crawford provided vocals.

The Very Best of Randy Crawford reached number 8 in the UK Albums Chart.

== Track listing ==
No.	Title	Writer(s)	Original album	Length
1.	"Street Life" (featuring The Crusaders)	Will Jennings; Joe Sample	Street Life	3:55
2.	"One Day I'll Fly Away"	Jennings; Sample	Now We May Begin	5:00
3.	"Rainy Night in Georgia"	Tony Joe White	Secret Combination	3:43
4.	"Almaz"	Randy Crawford	Abstract Emotions	4:04
5.	"You Might Need Somebody"	Non O'Byre; Tom Snow	Secret Combination	3:54
6.	"Secret Combination"	Snow; Franne Golde	Secret Combination	3:24
7.	"Tender Falls the Rain"	Crawford	Now We May Begin	4:13
8.	"This Old Heart of Mine"	Cecil Womack; Linda Womack	Nightline	3:58
9.	"Imagine" (featuring Yellowjackets)	John Lennon	Casino Lights	5:31
10.	"Knockin' on Heaven's Door"	Bob Dylan	Rich and Poor	5:00
11.	"Who's Crying Now"	Jonathan Cain; Steve Perry	Through the Eyes of Love	4:32
12.	"Same Old Story (Same Old Song)"	Jennings; Sample	Now We May Begin	4:05
13.	"One Hello"	Marvin Hamlisch; Carole Bayer Sager	Windsong	3:19
14.	"I've Never Been to Me"	Ken Hirsch; Ron Miller	Everything Must Change	3:35
15.	"I Stand Accused"	Jerry Butler	Raw Silk	4:50
16.	"Endlessly"	Brook Benton; Clyde Otis	Raw Silk	4:06
17.	"You Bring the Sun Out"	Snow; Jessy Dixon	Secret Combination	3:25
18.	"Everything Must Change"	Benard Ighner	Everything Must Change	4:50

== Charts ==
Chart (1993–94)	Peak position
Australia (ARIA)	23
UK (Official Charts Company)	8

== Certifications ==
Region	Certification	Certified units/sales
Australia (ARIA)	Gold	35,000^{^}
^{^} Shipments figures based on certification alone.
