= Felix Weber (songwriter) =

German composer, songwriter, and record producer

- Born: Felix Weber; December 1, 1960; Hassfurt, Bavaria, Germany
- Origin: Hassfurt, Bavaria
- Genres: Pop, R&B, gospel, new-age
- Occupations: Composer, songwriter, record producer
- Instruments: Piano, keyboards
- Years active: 1977 – present
- Website: Official website

Felix Weber (born December 1, 1960) is a German composer, songwriter, and record producer known for his contributions to popular and contemporary music, particularly in the American market. Over a multi-decade career, Weber has written and produced songs for numerous internationally recognized artists across genres, earning accolades including Billboard Top 40 hits and industry awards.

== Early life and education ==
Felix Weber was born in Hassfurt, Bavaria, Germany. At age seven, he began formal training as a classical pianist. By fourteen, Weber was performing in his first garage band, and at seventeen, he toured U.S. Army clubs stationed in Bavaria with an American cover band ("Hudson People"). It was during this period that he met longtime songwriting partner Irmgard Klarmann. They produced their first record together in 1978 at the Galgenberg Studio in Stuttgart.

== Early career in Germany ==
Following his initial recording experience, Weber worked in different German recording studios, primarily at the Rainbow and Paradise Studios in Munich. There, he met drummer and producer Todd Canedy, whose production expertise inspired Weber to establish his own studio. Under the duo name Klarmann/Weber, Weber and Klarmann penned numerous songs. In 1981, Weber became the keyboardist for the popular German band Relax. During this period, he developed industry connections that resulted in songwriting placements for prominent German artists including Mandy Winter, Bernie Paul, Gry Johansen, Veronika Fischer, Guillermo Marchena, and Kristina Bach.

In 1986, Weber left Relax to focus on an international career as a composer and producer. He signed with Sony Music, and after that contract ended, he entered a 15-year publishing agreement with Warner/Chappell Music Germany.

== International career ==
Inspired by American music since his youth, Weber concentrated on the U.S. market. His breakthrough came in 1988 when singer Tracie Spencer reached the Billboard Top 40 with Weber's composition "Symptoms of True Love". In 1989, Paul Anka recorded Weber's "Turning My Mind Back to You" for his Somebody Loves You album, produced by Humberto Gatica. In 1990, The Braxtons, featuring Toni Braxton, released Weber's "Good Life."

Weber achieved his first US No. 1 hit in 1992 with Chaka Khan’s "Love You All My Lifetime" from her Grammy-winning album The Woman I Am. The song earned an ASCAP award for Weber, and Billboard magazine recognized Klarmann/Weber as the "most successful German songwriters" in the American market at the time. That same year, Randy Crawford's "A Lot That You Can Do," written by Weber, reached No. 74 on the Billboard R&B chart.

Over the following years, Weber’s compositions were recorded by artists including La Toya Jackson ("Bad Girl"), Leo Sayer, La Bouche (whose song "I'll Be There" was featured on the double platinum "Sweet Dreams" album). I'll be there" was also recorded by Penny Ford, co-produced with Randy Jackson, and became the signature song for the Chicago Bulls after their Three-Peat NBA championship wins. The song was also included in the Chicago Bulls documentary. Weber also wrote for British Soul artist Beverley Knight, Jennifer Rush, Christian singer Kathy Troccoli, Sheree Jeacocke, Lory Bianco, Japanese pop idol Seiko Matsuda, Exposé, Duran Duran singer B.J.Nelson, Nancy Wilson "Anything for your love" on her 47th studio album "If I Had My Way", and Vanessa Amorosi. He also collaborated with notable industry figures including the late Skip Scarborough, Sheb Wooley and Randy Jackson.

== Later career and current activities ==
In 2000, Weber relocated to the United States and established his own music production company, continuing his work as a songwriter and producer for a variety of artists. Between 2013 and 2016, Weber collaborated together with his songwriter and producer partners Thomas Schmitt and Irmgard Klarmann on two albums for German artist Maria Voskania (who rose to fame through Deutschland sucht den Superstar (DSDS), the German equivalent of American Idol). During this period, Weber also began focusing on writing and producing for Christian music artists, expanding his repertoire to include contemporary Christian genres.

== Discography and production credits ==
=== Notable songwriting and production credits ===
Notable songwriting and production credits
Year	Artist	Title/Album	Role(s)	Notes
1988	Tracie Spencer	"Symptoms of True Love"	Songwriter	Billboard Top 40
1989	Paul Anka	"Turning My Mind Back to You" (Somebody Loves You)	Songwriter	produced by Humberto Gatica, drums Jeff Porcaro, keyboards Robbie Buchanan, guitar Paul Jackson Jr., bass Neil Stubenhaus, strings arrangement Jeremy Lubbock
1989	Sheree Jeacocke	"Forever You, Forever Me"	Songwriter	
1989	B.J. Nelson	"Measure this love"	Songwriter	produced by Robert Palmer
1989	Jennifer Rush	"For All That" (Wings of Desire)	Songwriter	produced by Phil Ramone
1990	The Braxtons	"Good Life"	Songwriter	
1990	Lory Bianco	"Heartbreaker" (Lonely Is The Night)	Songwriter	
1990	Seiko Matsuda	"He's So Good to Me"	Songwriter	produced by Maurice Starr
1991	Leo Sayer	"I Will Fight for You"	Songwriter	
1992	Chaka Khan	"Love You All My Lifetime" (The Woman I Am)	Songwriter, Producer	US #1, ASCAP Award, produced by David Gamson, bass Abraham Laboriel
1992	Randy Crawford	"A Lot That You Can Do"	Songwriter	Billboard R&B #74, produced by Michael Powell
1992	La Toya Jackson	"Bad Girl"	Songwriter	
1994	Kathy Troccoli	"I'll Be There for You"	Songwriter	produced by Michael Omartian, guitar Dan Huff
1994	Penny Ford	"I'll Be There"	Songwriter, Producer, musician	With Randy Jackson, Chicago Bulls documentary
1995	Beverley Knight	The B-Funk	Songwriter, Producer, musician	labelled "best British soul album ever" by Echoes magazine in 1995.
1996	La Bouche	"I'll Be There" (Sweet Dreams)	Songwriter, musician	Double platinum album
1997	Nancy Wilson	"Anything for your love"	Songwriter	produced by Skip Scarborough

=== German and European pop ===
German and European pop credits
Year	Artist	Title/Album	Role(s)
1981–1987	Relax	Various	Keyboardist, Songwriter
1980s–1990s	Mandy Winter, Bernie Paul, Gry Johansen, Veronika Fischer, Guillermo Marchena, Wolfgang Fierek, Kristina Bach	Various	Songwriter

=== Work with Maria Voskania ===
Maria Voskania collaborations
Year	Title/Album	Role(s)	Collaborators
2014	Lust am Leben	co-producer, Songwriter, musician	Irmgard Klarmann, Thomas Schmitt
2016	Perlen und Gold	co-producer, Songwriter, musician	Irmgard Klarmann, Thomas Schmitt

=== Contemporary Christian and other projects ===
Contemporary Christian & inspirational projects
Year	Artist/Project	Role(s)
2000s–present	Kathy Troccoli, Coram Deo, CS Weber, 316Music	Producer, Songwriter, Arranger
2000s–present	Various Christian and inspirational artists	Producer, Songwriter
