= Save Your Love =

Save Your Love may refer to:

- "Save Your Love", song by Kiss from Dynasty (1979)
- "Save Your Love", song by Jefferson Starship from Modern Times (1981)
- "Save Your Love" (Great White song) (1987)
- "Save Your Love" (Rene & Angela song) (1985)
- "Save Your Love" (Renée and Renato song) (1982)
- "Save Your Love" (Tracie Spencer song) (1990)
