= The Jackson Family Honors =

1994 American TV special

- Directed by: Dwight Hemion
- Starring: Michael Jackson, Elizabeth Taylor, Berry Gordy
- Country of origin: United States
- Original language: English

Production
- Executive producer: Jermaine Jackson
- Producers: Dwight Hemion; Gary Smith
- Editor: Andy Zall
- Running time: 120 minutes

Original release
- Network: NBC
- Release: February 22, 1994

The Jackson Family Honors is a 1994 Jackson family reunion television special, starring Michael Jackson, tribute honorees Elizabeth Taylor and Berry Gordy, and celebrity guests performers. It was billed as a humanitarian event to raise money for charities. The musical benefit was filmed on February 19, 1994 at the MGM Grand in Las Vegas. It was broadcast on February 22, 1994 on NBC.

== Description ==
The show was intended as a charity event with proceeds going to Los Angeles earthquake relief charities and the American Red Cross, amongst others. It was the hope of the Jackson family and Gary Smith, the producer, that NBC would make the event a yearly television special. The show was Michael's first stage appearance since he cancelled the remainder of his worldwide tour in November.

The show was initially scheduled for December 11, 1993 in Atlantic City. It was rescheduled by NBC for February in Las Vegas.

Over 20 members of the Jackson family sang "Goin' Back to Indiana". Celine Dion, Smokey Robinson, Dionne Warwick, Gladys Knight, Paul Rodriguez, and Bruce Hornsby were among the performers.

The musical benefit was filmed on February 19, 1994 at the MGM Grand in Las Vegas. While ticket prices were reduced after the show was rescheduled, of the twelve thousand tickets sold, fans paid as high as $1,000 each. 250 reporters showed up.

After two hours of live performances and videos of Michael Jackson, Michael appeared and was given a standing ovation which lasted five minutes. He presented lifetime achievement awards to Berry Gordy, founder of Motown Records, and Elizabeth Taylor, for her work for on behalf of AIDS patients. He said to the audience "I love you. Love, loyalty and friendship."

Michael joined the Jackson family and celebrity guests for the finale song "If You Only Believe".

== Litigation ==
After the show ended up losing money, producers Smith-Hemion filed a breach of contract lawsuit against members of the Jackson family, claiming that they were promised Michael Jackson would perform solo, saying the problems began when Michael cancelled his performance for the original 1993 date, and unpaid bills. Michael testified he only agreed to appear onstage, not to perform. In 1996, after confusion amongst the jurors, U.S. District Judge Laughlin Waters declared a mistrial.

== Cast ==
- Michael Jackson
- Quincy Jones
- Elizabeth Taylor
- Berry Gordy
- 3T
- Boyz II Men
- Cindera Che
- Celine Dion
- Aretha Franklin
- Louis Gossett Jr.
- Bruce Hornsby
- Brandi Jackson
- Jackie Jackson
- Janet Jackson
- Jermaine Jackson
- Joe Jackson
- Katherine Jackson
- Marlon Jackson
- Randy Jackson
- Rebbie Jackson
- Taj Jackson
- Taryll Jackson
- Tito Jackson
- TJ Jackson
- The Jacksons
- Gladys Knight
- Reba McEntire
- Lisa Marie Presley
- Smokey Robinson
- Paul Rodriguez
- Dionne Warwick
