= Make It Funky (disambiguation) =

"Make It Funky" is a 1971 two-part single by James Brown.

Make It Funky may also refer to:

- "Make It Funky", a single by American rapper Ice-T on his 1987 debut album Rhyme Pays
- "Make It Funky", a song by Paul Robb on the 1988 album Information Society (album)
- "Make It Funky", a 1988 single by hip hop duo Audio Two
- Make It Funky – The Big Payback: 1971–1975, a 1996 compilation album by James Brown that includes the song Make It Funky, parts 1, 2, 3 and 4
- Make It Funky (film), a 2005 American documentary film

== See also ==
- "This Time Make It Funky", a 1991 single by Tracie Spencer
