= Only Believe =

Only Believe can refer to:

- "Only Believe", a gospel song written by Paul Rader
- "If You'd Only Believe", a 1989 song by the Jacksons
- "Only Believe" (Holby City), an episode from the season 10 of the British television series Holby City
