= Make the Difference =

Studio album by Tracie Spencer
- Released: August 27, 1990
- Genre: R&B; soul; new jack swing; pop
- Length: 60:37
- Label: Capitol
- Producer: Matt Sherrod; Paul Sherrod; Steve Barri; Tony Peluso; Kyle Hudnall; Craig T. Cooper; Sir Spence; Steve Durham; Fil Brown; Tony Robinson

Tracie Spencer chronology
Tracie Spencer (1988)	Make the Difference (1990)	Naturelle (1994)

Singles from Make The Difference
- 1. "Save Your Love" Released: July 30, 1990; 2. "This House" Released: November 7, 1990; 3. "This Time Make It Funky" Released: May 1, 1991; 4. "Tender Kisses" Released: July 16, 1991; 5. "Love Me" Released: February 4, 1992

Professional ratings
Review scores
Source	Rating
Allmusic	2.5/5 stars

Make the Difference is the second studio album by American singer-songwriter Tracie Spencer. It was released on August 27, 1990, by Capitol Records.

== Background ==
The album consists some of Spencer's most notable songs, including "Tender Kisses" which peaked at number 1 on the Hot R&B Singles chart and number 42 on the Billboard Hot 100 pop chart in 1991. Spencer's other single, "This House" reached number 3 on the Billboard Hot 100 in March 1991, and became her second consecutive top 10 hit on Billboard magazine's Hot R&B Singles chart, where it peaked at number 7 that same month.

== Track listing ==
1. "This House" (Matt Sherrod, Paul Sherrod, Sir Spence) – 5:07
2. "Save Your Love" (Kenny Harris) – 5:05
3. "Tender Kisses" (Matt Sherrod, Paul Sherrod, Sir Spence, Tracie Spencer) – 5:28
4. "Too Much of Nothing" (Matt Sherrod, Paul Sherrod) – 5:14
5. "Double O Rhythm" (Kyle Hudnall, Sir Spence, Tracie Spencer) – 4:49
6. "You Make the Difference" (Matt Sherrod, Paul Sherrod, Sir Spence) – 5:05
7. "This Time Make It Funky" (Matt Sherrod, Paul Sherrod, Sir Spence) – 5:25
8. "I Like That" (Kyle Hudnall) – 5:05
9. "I Have a Song to Sing" (Matt Sherrod, Paul Sherrod, Sir Spence) – 4:36
10. "Sweeter Love" (Matt Sherrod, Paul Sherrod, Sir Spence) – 4:13
11. "Love Me" (Fil Brown, Tony Robinson) – 5:03
12. "Tracie's Hideout" (Matt Sherrod, Paul Sherrod, Sir Spence) – 5:55

== Charts ==
Chart (1990)	Peak position
Australian Albums (ARIA Charts)	151
US Billboard 200	107
US Top R&B/Hip-Hop Albums (Billboard)	38
