= This House (Tracie Spencer song) =

1990 single by Tracie Spencer

Single by Tracie Spencer

from the album Make the Difference
- B-side: "I Have a Song to Sing"
- Released: November 7, 1990
- Studio: Cherokee
- Length: 5:06
- Label: Capitol
- Songwriters: Matt Sherrod; Paul Sherrod; Sir Spence
- Producers: Matt Sherrod; Paul Sherrod

Tracie Spencer singles chronology
"Save Your Love" (1990)	"This House" (1990)	"This Time Make It Funky" (1991)

Audio
- "This House" on YouTube

"This House" is a song by American singer–songwriter Tracie Spencer. This song was the second single released from Spencer's second album, Make the Difference (1990). Issued via the Capitol Records label, the single was released on November 7, 1990. "This House" was Spencer's second consecutive top-10 hit on the US Billboard Hot R&B Singles chart, peaking at number seven, and became her only top-10 hit on the Billboard Hot 100, reaching number three in March 1991. Outside the US, "This House" peaked at number 41 in Canada and number 26 in New Zealand.

== Track listings ==
- US 12-inch single

A1. "This House" (vocal remix) – 7:50
A2. "This House" (7-inch remix) – 4:39
A3. "This House" (ambient dub) – 6:38
B1. "This House" (LP version) – 5:05
B2. "This House" (radio edit) – 4:46
B3. "This House" (instrumental) – 5:11

- US cassette single
1. "This House" (LP version)
2. "This House" (radio edit)
3. "I Have a Song to Sing" (LP version)
- UK and Australian 7-inch single; Australian cassette single
1. "This House" (7-inch radio edit) – 3:54
2. "I Have a Song to Sing" (LP version) – 4:37
- UK 12-inch single

A1. "This House" (vocal remix) – 7:50
B1. "This House" (ambient dub) – 6:38
B2. "This House" (7-inch remix) – 4:39

- UK CD single
1. "This House" (radio edit)
2. "I Have a Song to Sing" (LP version)
3. "This House" (vocal remix)
- Japanese mini-CD single
1. "This House" (single version)
2. "This House" (club mix)

== Charts ==
=== Weekly charts ===
Weekly chart performance for "This House"
Chart (1991)	Peak position
Australia (ARIA)	87
Canada Top Singles (RPM)	41
Canada Dance/Urban (RPM)	7
New Zealand (Recorded Music NZ)	26
UK Singles (Official Charts)	65
UK Airplay (Music Week)	42
UK Dance (Music Week)	29
US Billboard Hot 100	3
US 12-inch Singles Sales (Billboard)	26
US Dance Club Play (Billboard)	7
US Hot R&B Singles (Billboard)	7
US Cash Box Top 100	4

=== Year-end charts ===
Year-end chart performance for "This House"
Chart (1991)	Position
US Billboard Hot 100	45
US Hot R&B Singles (Billboard)	76
US Cash Box Top 100	37

== Release history ==
Release dates and formats for "This House"
Region	Date	Format(s)	Label(s)	Ref.
United States	November 7, 1990	12-inch vinyl; cassette	Capitol	
Australia	March 11, 1991	12-inch vinyl	Capitol	
United Kingdom	March 11, 1991	7-inch vinyl; 12-inch vinyl; CD; cassette	Capitol	
Australia	April 1, 1991	7-inch vinyl; cassette	Capitol	
United Kingdom	April 15, 1991	7-inch vinyl; cassette (remix)	Capitol	
Japan	April 19, 1991	Mini-CD	Capitol	
