= Every Kind of Mood — Randy, Randi, Randee =

Studio album by Randy Crawford
- Released: January 20, 1998
- Studio: Big House Studio; Chocolate City; Peppermint Park
- Genre: Soul; smooth jazz
- Length: 1:04:40
- Label: Bluemoon/Atlantic
- Producer: Jens Krause; Mousse T

Randy Crawford chronology
Naked and True (1995)	Every Kind of Mood — Randy, Randi, Randee (1998)	Permanent/Play Mode (2000)

Every Kind of Mood is a studio album by Randy Crawford, released in 1998 by Bluemoon/Atlantic Records and produced by Jens Krause and Mousse T. The album peaked at No. 3 on the Billboard Top Jazz Albums chart and No. 2 on the Billboard Top Contemporary Jazz Albums chart.

== Critical reception ==
Professional ratings
Review scores
Source	Rating
AllMusic	3/5 stars

With a 3 out of 5 star rating, Stephen Thomas Erlewine of AllMusic wrote that "Every Kind of Mood may not quite deliver on the promise of the title, but it's nevertheless a fine collection of smooth urban R&B and adult contemporary pop."

== Singles ==
Crawford's cover of "Wishing On a Star" reached number 14 on the US Billboard Dance Club Songs chart and number 21 on the UK R&B Singles chart. "Bye Bye" reached number 6 on the US Billboard Adult R&B Songs chart, and "Silence" reached number 21 on the same chart.

== Track listing ==
1	Breaking Down	Stevie B-Zet, A.C. Boutsen, Linda Carriere	04:26
2	Bye Bye	Inaya Davis, Errol Rennalls, Mousse T.	04:59
3	I'd Be an Angel	Jens Krause, Astrid North	04:50
4	Unwounded	Stevie B-Zet	03:07
5	Captain of Her Heart	Felix Haug, Kurt Maloo	04:57
6	Wishing on a Star	Billie Rae Calvin	04:51
7	Are You Sure	Errol Rennalls, Mousse T.	04:29
8	Sweet Regine	Audrey Martells, Peter Zizzo	04:15
9	Johnny	Joseph Scott	02:43
10	Let It Rain	A.C. Boutsen, Linda Carriere	03:52
11	Living in Silence	Jens Krause, Astrid North	04:05
12	Changes	Randy Crawford, Roberto Vally	04:41
13	Almaz	Randy Crawford	04:29
14	Honey for My Honey	Randy Crawford	04:26
15	Hymn of the Big Wheel	Grantley Marshall, Andrew Vowles, Robert Del Naja, Horace Andy, Neneh Cherry	06:00
