= Through the Eyes of Love (Randy Crawford album) =

Studio album by Randy Crawford
- Released: 1992
- Studio: Vanguard Studios, United Sound Systems and The Sound Suite (Detroit, Michigan); Studio A (Dearborn Heights, Michigan); Aire L.A. Studios (Glendale, California); Echo Sound (Los Angeles, California); Sedic Studio and Little Bach Studio (Tokyo, Japan); UMBI Studios (Modena, Italy)
- Label: Warner Bros.
- Producer: Michael J. Powell; Sadao Watanabe; Corrado Rustici

Randy Crawford chronology
Rich and Poor (1989)	Through the Eyes of Love (1992)	The Very Best of Randy Crawford (1993)

Through the Eyes of Love is the tenth studio album by American jazz and R&B singer Randy Crawford, released in 1992 by Warner Bros. Records.

== Critical reception ==
Professional ratings
Review scores
Source	Rating
AllMusic	3/5 stars

In a review for AllMusic, Ron Wynn described Through the Eyes of Love as a "nice, highly stylized album", and that it was "expressively sung, if at times overproduced".

== Track listing ==
No.	Title	Writer(s)	Length
1.	"Who's Crying Now"	Steve Perry; Jonathan Cain	4:32
2.	"It's Raining"	Randy Crawford; Pino Daniele	5:07
3.	"When Love Is New"	Crawford; Michael J. Powell	4:40
4.	"If I Were (In Your Shoes)"	Crawford; Grazia Di Michele; Joanna Di Michele; Giuseppe Nocera; Barry Coffing; Barry A. Gross	3:50
5.	"Rhythm of Romance"	Jimmy Scott; Richard Feldman	4:16
6.	"Shine"	Rolf Graf; Steinar Field	4:56
7.	"Hold On, Be Strong"	Allee Willis; Sami McKinney; Michael O'Hara	4:05
8.	"A Lot That You Can Do"	Irmgard Klarmann; Felix Weber	5:01
9.	"If You'd Only Believe"	Billie Hughes; Roxanne Seeman; Jermaine Jackson	5:17
10.	"Like the Sun Out of Nowhere"	Crawford; Zucchero; Gino Paoli	3:14
11.	"Just a Touch"	Crawford; Sadao Watanabe	3:31
12.	"Diamante" (with Zucchero)	Zucchero; Frank Musker; Francesco De Gregori	4:41

== Personnel ==
=== Musicians ===
- Randy Crawford – vocals
- Vernon Fails – keyboards (1–10), rhythm arrangements (1–10)
- Eddie Howard – acoustic piano (1), keyboard solo (6)
- Joe Sample – acoustic piano solo (1)
- David Ward – keyboard programming (1, 3, 6–9), programming (2, 4, 5, 10), drum programming (6, 7), percussion programming (6, 8, 9)
- Earl J. Wright – Hammond B3 organ (10)
- Soichi Noriki – keyboards (11), arrangements (11)
- Michael J. Powell – guitars (1, 3–8, 10), percussion (1–10), rhythm arrangements (1–10), acoustic guitar solo (2), backing vocals arrangements (3)
- Donnie Lyles – guitars (3)
- Paul Jackson Jr. – guitars (11)
- Al Turner – bass (1–10)
- Nathan East – bass (11)
- Buster Marbury – drums (1, 2, 4, 8, 10)
- Peter Erskine – drums (11)
- Paul D. Allen – percussion programming (1, 3, 9), drums (3), drum programming (3, 9), programming (5), keyboard programming (6)
- Marlon Crawford – percussion (5)
- Alex Acuña – percussion (11)
- Courtlen Hale – saxophone (1), French horn (4)
- Lenny Price – saxophone (2)
- Dave McMurray – saxophone (4), sax solo (10)
- Sadao Watanabe – alto saxophone (11)
- Niko Marks – harmonica (9)
- Corrado Rustici – arrangements (12)
- Esther Ridgeway – backing vocals (1–10), backing vocals arrangements (2, 3, 5, 7, 8, 10)
- Gloria Ridgeway – backing vocals (1–10), backing vocals arrangements (2, 3, 5, 7, 8, 10)
- Gracie Ridgeway – backing vocals (1–10), backing vocals arrangements (2, 3, 5, 7, 8, 10)
- Valerie Pinkston-Mayo – backing vocals (3, 4, 6, 9, 10), backing vocals arrangements (3)
- Gerald Lyles – backing vocals (4, 6, 9, 10)
- Mark Morris – backing vocals (4, 6, 9, 10)
- Donald Ray Mitchell – backing vocals (4, 6, 9, 10)
- Zucchero Fornaciari – vocals (12)

=== Technical ===
- Leonard Richardson – executive producer (1–10)
- Hiroshi Makishima – A&R (11)
- Toshi Tanaka – A&R (11)
- Yasushi Tomita – A&R (11)
- Michele Torpedine – executive producer (12)
- Michael J. Powell – producer (1–10), mixing (1–10)
- Sadao Watanabe – producer (11)
- Corrado Rustici – producer (12)
- Paul D. Allen – recording (1–10), assistant mix engineer (2, 4–7, 9, 10)
- David Ward – recording (1–10), assistant mix engineer (1, 3, 8)
- Milton Chan – recording (1)
- Eric Scheda – recording (1–3, 5–10)
- Elliot Peters – mix engineer (1, 3, 6–8), mixing (1, 3, 6–8)
- Randy Poole – recording (2, 4, 5, 7)
- Gerald Smerek – mix engineer (2, 4, 5, 8, 9), mixing (2, 4, 5, 8, 9)
- Mike Iacopelli – recording (10)
- Gordon Lyon – engineer (12)
- Chris Potter – mixing (12)
- Tom Baker – mastering at Future Disc (Hollywood, California)
- Tiarzha M. Taylor – album coordinator
- Johnny Lee – art direction, design
- Victoria Pearson – photography
- Barry Gross – management, direction

== Charts ==
Chart (1992)	Peak position
Australian Albums (ARIA)	113
Dutch Albums (Album Top 100)	92
German Albums (Offizielle Top 100)	57
Norwegian Albums (VG-lista)	1
Swedish Albums (Sverigetopplistan)	34
US Top R&B/Hip-Hop Albums (Billboard)	49
