= If You'd Only Believe =

Song by The Jacksons

from the album 2300 Jackson Street
- Released: May 23, 1989
- Recorded: 1988–1989
- Genre: Pop; R&B
- Length: 6:13
- Label: Epic; CBS
- Songwriters: Jermaine Jackson; Billie Hughes; Roxanne Seeman
- Producers: Michael Omartian; The Jacksons

Music video
- "If You'd Only Believe" on YouTube

"If You'd Only Believe" is an inspirational pop song written by Roxanne Seeman, Billie Hughes, and Jermaine Jackson. It was produced by Michael Omartian, with The Jacksons as co-producer, on their 2300 Jackson Street album.

"If You'd Only Believe" was the finale song for The Jackson Family Honors television special. Michael Jackson joined his family and guest artists including Celine Dion, Smokey Robinson, Gladys Knight, Bruce Hornsby and Dionne Warwick on stage to sing it. The show was filmed at the MGM Grand in Las Vegas.

== Background ==
Jermaine Jackson and his brothers were making their first Jacksons album since their 1984 “Victory” album. This album was without Michael. The Jacksons had been recording for weeks at Tito Jackson's recording studio at his home in Encino. While CBS focused on Michael's solo career, the label was not giving The Jacksons any attention and did not believe they could keep having commercial success without him.

Roxanne Seeman, a songwriter Jermaine had a working relationship with, gave Jermaine “If You’d Only Believe” on a cassette of songs written with Billie Hughes that she brought with her on a trip to Paris and gave to Jermaine at the Intercontinental Hotel Paris where he was staying. Returning to Los Angeles, Jermaine called her saying he was making an album with his brothers and Michael Omartian and they wanted to record the song. It was the final track on 2300 Jackson Street.

When the record label heard “If You’d Only Believe” they began giving attention and finally flew members of their promotion staff to Tito's studio in a show of support. The management team of Fitzgerald-Hartley approached the group after hearing some of the songs claiming “the music simply blew us away.”

== Lyrics and song structure ==
"If You'd Only Believe"
Sample from If You'd Only Believe

Geoff Brown in his book "Michael Jackson, A Life in Music" described "The Omartian contribution, the final track, is a Jermaine sung ballad titled “If You’d Only Believe”, a nice mid-tempo song about constancy in love and hope for the future”."

Fred Bronson and The Jacksons quote songwriter Roxanne Seeman describing the song lyrics on their book "The Jacksons Legacy": The verse lyrics for “If You’d Only Believe” were inspired by Victor Hugo's Les Misérables and (the character) Jean Valjean:

I have seen love make men stagger,

Prey on their weakness and wound their pride,

But you won’t be touched by its dagger,

When you’re close by my side.

The structure of Billie Hughes' original version is AABCABCB, where A represents the verse, B the chorus, C the bridge. His version was named “Only Believe”.

For The Jacksons' recording, Michael Omartian re-arranged the sections and added a new bridge (C): ABACADAB. Jermaine sings the lead vocal on the A and B sections and Jackie on the bridge.

== Live performances and usage in other media ==
The trio of Jermaine, Tito and Jackie performed "If You'd Only Believe" along with "Art Of Madness" and Nothin' (That Compares 2 U) on a Spanish television program named Sábado Noche in 1989.

Jermaine Jackson also performed this song alone on January 14, 1990 in Atlanta in a tribute to Martin Luther King during King Week 90'.

The song was performed again in concert on March 15, 1993, by The Jacksons, composed of Jackie, Tito, Jermaine and Randy, on the stage of the Grand Théâtre de Genève for The Evening Of The Nations.

=== The Jackson Family Honors ===
"If You'd Only Believe" was the theme song and finale of "The Jackson Family Honors", a show which took place at the MGM Grand Garden Arena in Las Vegas in February 1994. It was taped for broadcast on NBC as a TV special, airing three days later. Jermaine Jackson stated the show was intended as an annual charity event honoring humanitarians.

The song was performed by The Jackson Family, including a performance by Michael Jackson with guest performers Celine Dion, Dionne Warwick, Gladys Knight, Smokey Robinson, Bruce Hornsby and others.

It was Michael Jackson's first appearance on stage since he cancelled his world tour in November 1993. He presented lifetime achievement awards to Elizabeth Taylor and Motown Records founder Berry Gordy.

Bernard Weinraub of the New York Times wrote, “Michael Jackson was the undisputed, if reluctant, star of the evening. He did not give a solo performance and only joined in the finale with his family singing the inspirational pop song “If You Only Believe”.

== Billie Hughes version ==
Billie Hughes' version with the title "Only Believe” appears in the television shows Another World, The Guiding Light, and As the World Turns. It is included in the Billie Hughes compilation album "Songs from Santa Barbara”, released digitally in 2005.

== Other versions ==
- Randy Crawford recorded a version of "If You'd Only Believe" on her 1992 album, Through the Eyes of Love.

== Critical reception ==
On May 21, 1989, Geoffrey Himes of The Washington Post wrote in his review of 2300 Jackson Street in the Pop Recordings column:

“Even better is "If You'd Only Believe," the kind of slow hymn Gaye used to do. At first it seems to be addressing God, but then it addresses a lover; the echoing percussion and spacious mix are also typical Gaye tendencies”.

LA Weekly, June 22, 1989 Leonard Pitts Jr.:

“If You’d Only Believe” a moving evocative sing-along. Although not nearly as solemn, it’s cut from the same “slow anthem” block as Prince’s “Purple Rain"

The Morning Call, September 30, 1989 Paul Willistein wrote from The Jacksons 2300 Street album:

“On…If You’d Only Believe” - the brothers’ always-fine harmonies fare best” and Jermaine’s distinctive vocals make the songs where he sings lead above average."

The Tennessean, Nashville, Tennessee, August 6, 1969, Robert K. Oerman on 2300 Jackson Street album writes:

“The LP closes with the soft, anthemic masterpiece “If You’d Only Believe”.

== Personnel ==
- Erich Bulling – drum programming, synthesizer
- Jackie Jackson – lead vocals, backing vocals, finger snaps
- Jermaine Jackson – lead vocals, backing vocals, fingers snaps
- Paul Jackson, Jr. – guitar
- Randy Jackson – backing vocals
- Tito Jackson – backing vocals
- Michael Omartian – piano, synthesizer programming, finger snaps

== Production ==
- Michael Omartian – producer, arranger
- David Alhert – engineer
- Pee Wee Jackson – assistant engineer
- Terry Christian – assistant engineer
