= Tracie (album) =

Studio album by Tracie Spencer
- Released: June 29, 1999
- Genre: R&B; pop
- Length: 51:05
- Label: Capitol
- Producer: Soulshock & Karlin; Arnold Hennings

Tracie Spencer chronology
The Best of Tracie Spencer (1996)	Tracie (1999)

Singles from Traci Spencer
- 1. "It's All About You (Not About Me)" Released: May 25, 1999; 2. "Still in My Heart" Released: October 15, 1999

Tracie is the third studio album by R&B singer Tracie Spencer released on June 29, 1999. Two singles were released from the album in 1999 with "It's All About You (Not About Me)" and "Still in My Heart", aided by music videos directed by Francis Lawrence and Kevin Bray, respectively. Tracie went to #114 on the Billboard 200 and #19 on R&B/Hip-Hop Albums chart becoming her highest charting album on that chart.

== Background and production ==
Tracie was Spencer's first album in nine years on Capitol Records. The primary reason for the length of time between her studio albums was due to Capitol's constant changes. At the time, the label went through several CEO's and eventually shut down their urban music division from 1996-1999. When the record label got a new president in former Arista Records executive Roy Lott, he revived Capitol's long-struggling urban music division. Spencer acknowledged the changes within Capitol in the liner notes of Tracie. She stated: "I have seen a lot of changes occur at the tower, but that's just the way life goes. I have nothing but love and respect for my record company. Change is good".

In between albums she recorded a couple of songs for the soundtracks of two films from the late 1990s. She sang "I'll Be There For You" for the 1997 Nickelodeon film Good Burger as well as the DJ Quik produced "The Rain" for the 1998 Maya Angelou directed film Down in the Delta. She worked with the Danish R&B production team Soulshock & Karlin for all but one song on Tracie, with Dallas Austin protege Arnold Hennings providing his lone contribution "Love To You".

== Critical reception ==
Professional ratings
Review scores
Source	Rating
AllMusic	3/5 stars

Allmusic editor Jaime Sunao Ikeda called's the album "a grouping of average material sung by an above-average singer. Tracie Spencer's gift has always been her ability to outshine the other aspiring divas of the day with excellent pitch and phrasing. On Tracie, however, we find her wasting her talents [...] The first ten tracks are virtually indistinguishable from each other [...] This album could have also done with reverse sequencing of the tracks and varying the sound of the others. Despite the lack of notable material on this attempt, Spencer will always remain one of the shining stars of the late-'90s generation of singers."

== Track listing ==
No.	Title	Writer(s)	Producer(s)	Length
1.	"Interlude (All About Love)"	Tracie Spencer; Carsten Schack; Kenneth Karlin	Soulshock & Karlin	1:32
2.	"If U Wanna Get Down"	Schack; Karlin; Tamara Savage	Soulshock & Karlin	4:17
3.	"It's All About You (Not About Me)"	Schack; Karlin; Heavynn	Soulshock & Karlin	4:14
4.	"Feelin' You" (featuring Sonja Blade)	Schack; Karlin; Savage	Soulshock & Karlin	4:32
5.	"Still in My Heart"	Schack; Karlin; Andrea Martin; Ivan Matias	Soulshock & Karlin	4:16
6.	"No Matter"	Alistair Tennant; Schack; Karlin; Regi Hargis; Spencer; Wayne Hector	Soulshock & Karlin	4:20
7.	"Closer"	Schack; Karlin; Spencer; Hector; Tennant	Soulshock & Karlin	4:32
8.	"Nothing Broken but My Heart"	Diane Warren	Soulshock & Karlin	4:46
9.	"Not Gonna Cry"	Schack; Karlin; Spencer; Deanna Brown; Deidra Brown; Yamma Brown	Soulshock & Karlin	4:26
10.	"It's on Tonight"	Schack; Karlin; Spencer; Trevor Smith; Harry Wayne Casey	Soulshock & Karlin	4:20
11.	"Love to You"	Arnold Hennings; Sir Spence	Hennings	4:36
12.	"Unbelievable"	Schack; Karlin; Spencer; Peter Biker	Soulshock & Karlin; Biker	5:05

Japan bonus track
No.	Title	Writer(s)	Producer(s)	Length
13.	"The Rain"	Schack; Karlin; Spencer	Soulshock & Karlin	5:11

Sample credits

- "No Matter" contains a sample of "Fun" by Brick.
- "Not Gonna Cry" contains a sample of "Don't Tell It" by James Brown.
- "It's On Tonight" contains a sample of "Get High Tonight" by Busta Rhymes.

== Personnel ==
- Drum Programming and Keyboards: Soulshock & Karlin, Arnold Hennings
- Guitar: Craig B on "Still in My Heart", "Closer", "Nothing Broken But My Heart" and "Not Gonna Cry"
- Background Vocals: Tamara Savage, Heavynn, Shiro, Sherron Bennett, Jacqueline Boyd, David Daughtery, Keisha Ealy, Yvette Williams
- Rap: Sonja Blade on "Feelin' You"
- Mixing: Manny Marroquin and Soulshock on all songs, except on "Love To You" (Michael Patterson)
- Mastering: Brian Gardner

== Charts ==
Chart (1999)	Peak position
US Billboard 200	114
US Top R&B/Hip-Hop Albums (Billboard)	19
