= Symptoms of True Love =

Single by Tracie Spencer

from the album Tracie Spencer
- Released: February 17, 1988
- Recorded: 1987; Cherokee Studios (Los Angeles, California)
- Genre: Freestyle; new jack swing; dance-pop
- Length: 4:21
- Label: Capitol
- Songwriters: Irmgard Klarmann; Felix Weber
- Producer: Ron Kersey

Tracie Spencer singles chronology
"Hide and Seek" (1988)	"Symptoms of True Love" (1988)	"Imagine" (1988)

"Symptoms of True Love" is a 1988 song by American singer–songwriter Tracie Spencer. This song is the second single released from Spencer's self-titled debut album. The single was released on February 17, 1988. The song was written by German composer team Irmgard Klarmann and Felix Weber.

== Background ==
Unlike her first single from the album (the ballad "Hide and Seek"), this song is an uptempo club/dance track. The theme of the song focuses on Spencer discovering that she is suffering from "symptoms of true love" and lists the causes.

== Chart information ==
"Symptoms of True Love" was Spencer's first single to chart on the Billboard Hot 100, reaching number 38. On the Hot Black Singles chart, it peaked at number 11.

== Music video ==
The music video for "Symptoms of True Love" was made in March 1988, and shows Spencer and a group of friends dancing and grooving along to the song. The video's set features comic book-style art in the vein of Roy Lichtenstein.

== Charts ==
Chart (1988)	Peak position
Germany (GfK)	24
Italy Airplay (Music & Media)	8
UK Singles (OCC)	100
US Billboard Hot 100	38
US Dance Club Songs (Billboard)	14
US Hot R&B/Hip-Hop Songs (Billboard)	11
