= Hide and Seek (Tracie Spencer song) =

Single by Tracie Spencer

from the album Tracie Spencer
- Released: 1988
- Recorded: 1987
- Genre: Pop; R&B
- Length: 4:33
- Label: Capitol
- Songwriter(s): Lynn Davis
- Producer(s): Ollie E. Brown

Tracie Spencer singles chronology
"Hide and Seek" (1988)	"Symptoms of True Love" (1988)

"Hide and Seek" is the first single from Tracie Spencer's self-titled debut album. It was released in December 1987 and was written by Lynn Davis.

== Chart information ==
"Hide and Seek" did not chart onto the Billboard Hot 100, but did place at number 32 on the R&B/Hip-Hop Singles & Tracks chart.

== Music video ==
The music video for "Hide and Seek" features Spencer singing the song in an audition for some kind of competition.

== Weekly charts ==
Chart (1988)	Peak position
US Hot R&B/Hip-Hop Songs (Billboard)	32
