= Still in My Heart =

Single by Tracie Spencer

from the album Tracie
- Released: October 19, 1999
- Recorded: 1999
- Genre: Pop; R&B
- Length: 4:17
- Label: Capitol
- Songwriter(s): C. Schack, K. Karlin, Andrea Martin, Ivan Matias
- Producer(s): Soulshock and Karlin

Tracie Spencer singles chronology
"It's All About You (Not About Me)" (1999)	"Still in My Heart" (1999)

"Still in My Heart" is the second single from Tracie Spencer's third album, Tracie. It was sent to urban contemporary radio on October 19, 1999. It failed to make much of an impression and peaked at #88 on the Billboard Hot 100 and #36 on Hot R&B/Hip-Hop Singles and Tracks chart in 2000.

== Music video ==
The music video was released in 2000. It shows Spencer on a beach.

== Weekly charts ==
Chart (2000)	Peak position
US Billboard Hot 100	88
US Dance Club Songs (Billboard)	39
US Dance Singles Sales (Billboard)	22
US Hot R&B/Hip-Hop Songs (Billboard)	36
