= Love Me (Tracie Spencer song) =

Single by Tracie Spencer

from the album Make the Difference
- Released: February 4, 1992
- Recorded: 1990 at Cherokee Studios (Los Angeles, California)
- Genre: R&B; pop; soul
- Length: 5:03
- Label: Capitol
- Songwriters: Fil Brown; Tony Robinson
- Producers: Fil Brown; Tony Robinson

Tracie Spencer singles chronology
"Tender Kisses" (1991)	"Love Me" (1992)	"It's All About You (Not About Me)" (1999)

"Love Me" is a 1992 song by American singer–songwriter Tracie Spencer. Released on February 4, 1992, this song is the fifth and final single from Spencer's second album, Make the Difference which was released in August 1990. The song was written by Fil Brown and Tony Robinson.

== Background ==
Like "Tender Kisses," "Love Me" is a ballad. The theme of the song focuses on Spencer asking someone to love her.

== Music video ==
The video version of the song is slightly different from the album version. The love interest in the video was played by Ray Leonard Jr., son of boxer Sugar Ray Leonard. It features some of the same couples from the "Tender Kisses" video and is filmed in the same way as "Tender Kisses" in appearance and the general look of sadness. One scene focuses on a man, unconscious, who has a door on his chest indicating the door to his heart. A woman standing over him has a window on her chest and reaches into the window to retrieve and flower and places it into the doorway on the man's chest.

== Chart information ==
"Love Me" followed up Spencer's number-one success of "Tender Kisses" on the Hot R&B Singles chart by peaking at number 2 in April 1992. On the Billboard Hot 100, the single performed moderately, hitting number 48 by the summer of 1992.

== Charts ==
=== Weekly charts ===
Chart (1992)	Peak position
US Billboard Hot 100	48
US Hot R&B/Hip-Hop Songs (Billboard)	2

=== Year-end charts ===
Chart (1992)	Position
US Hot R&B/Hip-Hop Songs (Billboard)	27
