= Tracie Spencer (album) =

Studio album by Tracie Spencer
- Released: 1988
- Recorded: June–November 1987
- Studio: Cherokee (Los Angeles, California)
- Genre: R&B; freestyle; soul; pop
- Length: 44:21
- Label: Capitol
- Producer: Ollie E. Brown; Wayne Edwards; Ron Kersey; Larry Lee; Dennis Matkosky; Michael O'Hara; Ike Stubblefield

Tracie Spencer chronology
Tracie Spencer (1988)	Make the Difference (1990)

Singles from Tracie Spencer
- 1. "Hide and Seek" Released: December 14, 1987; 2. "Symptoms of True Love" Released: February 17, 1988; 3. "Imagine" Released: July 1988

Professional ratings
Review scores
Source	Rating
AllMusic	3/5 stars

Tracie Spencer is the debut album of American singer Tracie Spencer, released in 1988 on Capitol Records.

== Overview ==
At the time of this release, Spencer was 11 years old and noted as the youngest female artist to sign a record deal with a major label. The single "Symptoms of True Love" peaked at No. 38 on the Billboard Hot 100 chart and No. 11 on the Billboard Hot Soul Songs chart. The singles "Hide and Seek" and "Imagine" also reached Nos. 32 and 31 on the Billboard Hot Soul Songs charts.

== Track listing ==
1. "Hide and Seek" (Lynn Davis) – 4:33
2. "Symptoms of True Love" (Irmgard Klarman, Felix Weber) – 5:05
3. "My Heart Beats Only 4 U" (James Allen, Cornelius Mims, John Bokowski) – 4:21
4. "In My Dreams" (Larry M. Lee, Ike Stubblefield) – 4:07
5. "Imagine" (Lennon) – 4:28
6. "Cross My Heart" (Michael Jay, Emily Burton) – 4:41
7. "Wanna Be" (Mims, Ollie E. Brown) – 5:20
8. "My First Broken Heart" (Dorothy S. Gazeley, Allan Rich) – 4:23
9. "Because of You" (Linda Creed, Dennis Matosky, John Lind, Leslie Hall) – 4:32
10. "Lullaby Child" (Lisa Haynes, Tony Haynes, Michael O'Hara) – 3:08

== Cover versions ==
"Imagine" is a cover of the John Lennon song. Eighth Wonder and Martika went on to cover her track "Cross My Heart" during the same year. The album track "My First Broken Heart" was covered by Filipina singer Iya Villania on her 2008 album Finally!.

== Personnel ==
- Tracie Spencer – lead vocals, rap (6)
- John Bokowski – synthesizers, programming
- Chuckii Booker – synthesizers
- Tom Keane – keyboards, acoustic piano, drums
- James Allen – programming
- Joe Curiale – synthesizers, programming
- Ron Kersey – keyboards
- Dennis Matkosky – keyboards, programming
- Michael O'Hara – keyboards, acoustic piano
- Monty Seward – acoustic piano, synthesizers, programming
- Aaron Smith – programming
- Ike Stubblefield – keyboards, programming
- David Zeman – synthesizers
- Cornelius Mims – synth bass, backing vocals
- Bruce Gaitsch – guitars
- James Harrah – guitars
- Paul Jackson, Jr. – guitars
- Josh Leo – guitars
- Johnny McGhee – guitars
- Greg Moore – guitars
- Josef Andre Parson – guitars
- David Williams – guitars
- Gregg Wright – guitars
- Jason Scheff – electric bass
- Ollie E. Brown – drums, percussion, programming, special effects, backing vocals, BGV arrangements (5)
- Paulinho da Costa – percussion
- Bobbye Hall – congas
- Bill Jones – saxophones
- Danny Pelfrey – saxophones
- Andrew Woolfolk – saxophones
- Gene Page – string arrangements (5)
- Leonard Caston Jr. – BGV arrangements (5)
- Marva Barnes – backing vocals
- Crystal Blake – backing vocals
- Alex Brown – backing vocals, BGV arrangements (2)
- Carl Carwell – backing vocals
- Lynn Davis – backing vocals, BGV arrangements (8)
- Vonciele Faggett – backing vocals
- Natalie Jackson – backing vocals
- Josie James – backing vocals
- Jean Johnson – backing vocals
- Carol Perry – backing vocals
- Darlene Perry – backing vocals
- Lori Perry – backing vocals
- Sharon Perry – backing vocals
- Angel Rogers – backing vocals
- Alfie Silas – backing vocals
- Cindy Silver – backing vocals
- Marty Spencer – rap (6)
- Cherri Wells – backing vocals
- Mona Lisa Young – backing vocals

== Production ==
- Wayne Edwards – executive producer, co-producer (4)
- Stan Plesser – executive producer, management
- Ollie E. Brown – producer (1, 3, 5, 6, 7), mixing, special remixing (8, 9)
- Ron Kersey – producer (2)
- Larry Lee – producer (4), recording, mixing
- Ike Stubblefield – producer (4)
- Dennis Matkosky – producer (8, 9, 10), recording
- Michael O'Hara – producer (10)
- Steve Halquist – recording, mixing, special remixing (8, 9)
- Hill Swimmer – recording, mixing
- Rob Weaver – recording
- Bobby Brooks – mixing
- Taavi Mote – mixing
- Frank Wolf – mixing
- Horatio Gordon – assistant engineer
- Mark Herman – assistant engineer
- Roy Kohara – art direction
- Roland Young – art direction
- Shiffman Young – design
- Dennis Keeley – photography

== Charts ==
Chart (1988)	Peak position
US Billboard 200	146
US Top R&B/Hip-Hop Albums (Billboard)	57
