= Tender Kisses =

Single by Tracie Spencer

from the album Make the Difference
- Released: July 16, 1991
- Recorded: 1990
- Studio: Cherokee Studios (Los Angeles, California)
- Genre: R&B; soul; pop
- Length: 5:28
- Label: Capitol
- Songwriters: Matt Sherrod; Paul Sherrod; Sir Spence; Tracie Spencer
- Producers: Matt Sherrod; Paul Sherrod

Tracie Spencer singles chronology
"This Time Make It Funky" (1991)	"Tender Kisses" (1991)	"Love Me" (1992)

"Tender Kisses" is a song by American singer–songwriter Tracie Spencer. This song is the fourth single released from Spencer's second album, Make the Difference which was released in August 1990. The single was released on July 16, 1991. The song was written by Matt Sherrod & Paul Sherrod, Sir Spence, and Tracie Spencer, and produced by Matt & Paul Sherrod. The song is one of Spencer's most known hits to date, reaching number 1 on the R&B chart in the United States by August 1991.

== Chart information ==
"Tender Kisses" became a summer hit in 1991, hitting number one on the Hot R&B Singles chart by August 1991 and number forty-two on the Billboard Hot 100 pop chart by summer's end.

== Song/music video ==
The theme of the song focuses on being heartbroken after a breakup. The music video for "Tender Kisses", directed by Kenny Mirman, was shot in Los Angeles, California, in June 1991, and opens with Spencer holding a rose in her hands and standing before a blue background with autumn leaves and glitter coming down around her. There are shots of Spencer on a swing, behind a window, and in a big chair, begging her lover to reconsider about leaving the relationship.

== Popular culture ==
Spencer appeared as herself and sang the song as a duet with Darius McCrary who played the character of Eddie Winslow on the sixteenth episode of Season 4 of the comedy/family sitcom Family Matters ("Tender Kisses", air date February 5, 1993).

== Charts ==
Chart (1991)	Peak position
US Billboard Hot 100	42
US Hot R&B/Hip-Hop Songs (Billboard)	1

== See also ==
- List of Hot R&B Singles number ones of 1991
