= It's All About You (Not About Me) =

Single by Tracie Spencer

from the album Tracie
- Released: May 25, 1999
- Recorded: 1998–1999
- Genre: Pop; R&B
- Length: 4:14
- Label: Capitol
- Songwriters: Heavynn; Karlin; Schack
- Producer: Soulshock & Karlin

Tracie Spencer singles chronology
"Love Me" (1992)	"It's All About You (Not About Me)" (1999)	"Still in My Heart" (2000)

"It's All About You (Not About Me)" is the first single from Tracie Spencer's third album, Tracie. The single was released on May 25, 1999. It was written by Heavynn, Karlin, and Schack. This was Spencer's first single since "Love Me" in 1992. A remix version features Black Thought from The Roots.

== Chart information ==
"It's All About You (Not About Me)" reached No. 6 on the Hot R&B/Hip-Hop Singles & Tracks chart and No. 18 on the Billboard Hot 100.

== Music video ==
The music video was directed by Francis Lawrence.

== Weekly charts ==
Chart (1999)	Peak position
Australia (ARIA)	107
Canada Dance/Urban (RPM)	25
UK Singles (Official Charts)	65
UK Dance (Official Charts)	13
UK Hip Hop/R&B (Official Charts)	10
US Billboard Hot 100	18
US Hot R&B/Hip-Hop Songs (Billboard)	6
US Rhythmic Airplay (Billboard)	21
