= Save Your Love (Tracie Spencer song) =

Single by Tracie Spencer

from the album Make the Difference
- Released: July 30, 1990
- Recorded: 1989 at Cherokee Studios (Los Angeles, California)
- Genre: Pop; R&B; soul
- Length: 4:40
- Label: Capitol
- Songwriter: Kenny Harris
- Producers: Steve Barri; Kenny Harris; Tony Peluso

Tracie Spencer singles chronology
"Imagine" (1988)	"Save Your Love" (1990)	"This House" (1990)

"Save Your Love" is a 1990 song by American singer–songwriter Tracie Spencer.The song served as the lead single from Spencer’s second studio album, Make the Difference, which was released in August 1990.The song was written by Kenny Harris and released on July 30, 1990. In this uptempo song, Spencer is expressing her love to someone by letting them know that she'll be "saving my love for you" and is asking that they do the same.

== Chart information ==
"Save Your Love" peaked at number 7 on the R&B Singles chart in Billboard magazine, becoming Spencer's first top-ten hit on the chart in late 1990.

== Weekly charts ==
Chart (1991)	Peak position
US Dance Club Songs (Billboard)	20
US Hot R&B/Hip-Hop Songs (Billboard)	7

== Personnel ==
- Additional production – Matt Sherrod and Paul Sherrod
- Arranged – Matt Sherrod, Paul Sherrod, & Sir Spence
- Background vocals – Tracie Spencer, The Boys, Tim Townsend, and Crystal Carlisle
