= Kenny Harris =

American football player (born 1975)

No. 39, 20
- Position: Safety

Personal information
- Born: April 27, 1975 (age 51); Durham, North Carolina, U.S.
- Listed height: 6 ft 1 in (1.85 m)
- Listed weight: 198 lb (90 kg)

Career information
- High school: Northern (Durham)
- College: NC State (1993–1996)
- NFL draft: 1997: undrafted

Career history
- Arizona Cardinals (1997); Arizona Cardinals (1999)*; → Rhein Fire (1999)
- * Offseason or practice squad member only
- Stats at Pro Football Reference

Kenneth Lamont Harris (born April 27, 1975) is an American former professional football safety who played for the Arizona Cardinals of the National Football League (NFL). He played college football for the NC State Wolfpack.

== Early life ==
Kenneth Lamont Harris was born on April 27, 1975, in Durham, North Carolina. He did not play football until his junior year at Northern High School in Durham. He started playing football because his basketball coach wanted him to stay conditioned. Harris missed six football games his junior year due to blood clots in his legs. As a senior in 1992, he recorded 70 tackles, three sacks, four interceptions, and eight pass breakups. He averaged 18 points and eight rebounds per game in basketball his senior season.

== College career ==
In January 1993, Harris committed to North Carolina State University to play college football for the Wolfpack. He had injury problems in 1994. He was a four-year letterman from 1993 to 1996.

== Professional career ==
After going undrafted in the 1997 NFL draft, Harris signed with the Arizona Cardinals on April 21. He was released on August 24 and signed to the practice squad on August 26. He was promoted to the active roster on October 6 and played in 11 games during the 1997 season as a reserve safety, posting four solo tackles and two assisted tackles. Harris became a free agent after the 1997 season.

Harris re-signed with the Cardinals on April 29, 1999. He played for the Rhein Fire during the 1999 NFL Europe season, totaling 15 tackles on defense, one special teams tackle, and four pass breakups. He was released by Arizona on August 25, 1999
