= Give Me the Night (song) =

1980 single by George Benson

- Variant for US, UK and Italian 7-inch singles, similar to cover art of the parent album of the same name

Single by George Benson

from the album Give Me the Night
- B-side: "Dinorah, Dinorah"
- Released: June 1980
- Genre: Soul; disco; R&B; jazz-funk
- Length: 3:41; 3:50 (commercial 7-inch); 4:58 (album); 5:03 (12-inch alternate mix)
- Label: Warner Bros.
- Songwriter: Rod Temperton
- Producer: Quincy Jones

George Benson singles chronology
"Hey Girl" (1979)	"Give Me the Night" (1980)	"Love X Love" (1980)

Music video
- "Give Me the Night" on YouTube

"Give Me the Night" is a song recorded by American jazz and R&B musician George Benson, released in June 1980 by Warner Bros. as the first single from his 18th studio album of the same title (1980). It was written by Heatwave's keyboard player Rod Temperton and produced by Quincy Jones. Patti Austin provides the backing and scat vocals that are heard throughout, and one of Benson's fellow jazz guitarists, Lee Ritenour, also performs on the track.

The song was a commercial success, and was Benson's first single to hit number one on the US Billboard Soul Singles chart, where it spent three weeks. It also peaked at number four on the US Billboard Hot 100 chart, making it his most successful pop entry. It also peaked at number two on the Billboard Hot Disco Singles chart and at number seven in the UK Singles Chart, where it ties with "In Your Eyes" as his highest charting single.

In 2021, Chris Molanphy listed the song as an example of the retrospectively named music genre yacht rock.

== Background ==
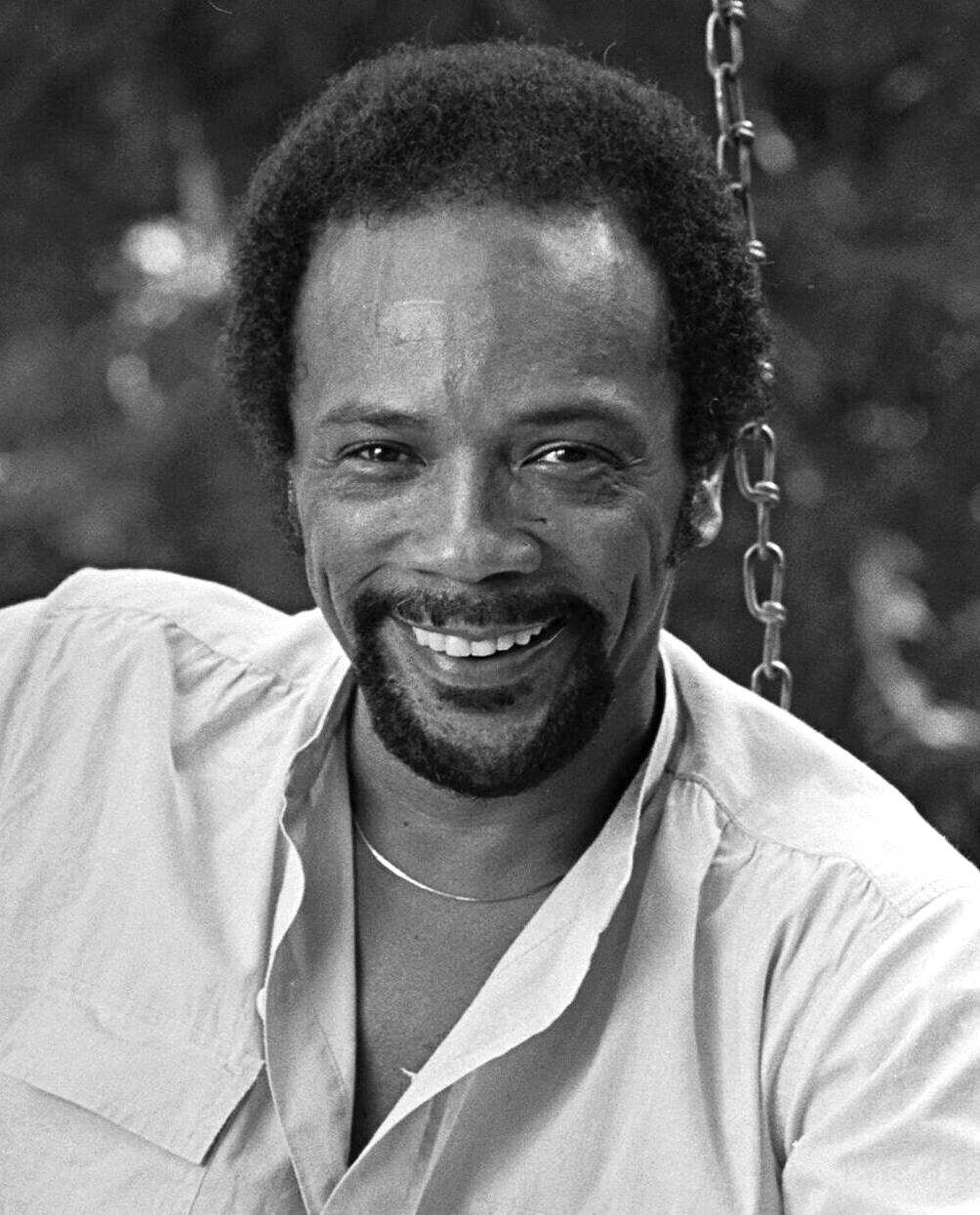
Jones in 1980

Producer Quincy Jones approached Benson when looking for new artists to join his label, Qwest Records. Benson agreed after listening to Michael Jackson's Off the Wall album that Jones produced. Jones then recruited Rod Temperton, a songwriter that also worked on Jackson's album.

After spending one month in the studio to finish the album, Jones persuaded Benson to stay when the latter was packing his bags. Jones insisted it would be a good song, and the recording of "Give Me the Night" was done in a day. Jones heard Benson's guitar part in the middle and placed it all over the track.

== Music video ==
The music video for "Give Me the Night" featured Benson performing the song both on stage with a band and on roller skates on the Venice Beach Boardwalk in Los Angeles under the sunset skies. In a 2024 interview with Spin, Benson saw the roller skaters nearby and asked his manager where his roller skates are. His manager was hesitant in order for Benson to not injure himself.

Benson insisted on filming the music video in roller skates and playing guitar simultaneously: "Nobody here can beat me skating, that’s why. Your problem is that you think about falling. When I skate, I’m just thinking about skating. That doesn’t mean I never fall. I just never think about it. I just skate."

== Track listing ==
- 7-inch, US (Warner Bros.)
1. "Give Me the Night"
2. "Dinorah, Dinorah"
- 7-inch, UK (Qwest/Warner Bros.)
1. "Give Me the Night"
2. "Breezin'"
- 12-inch, US (Warner Bros.)
1. "Give Me the Night" (long version)
2. "The World Is a Ghetto"
3. "Breezin'"

== Personnel ==
- George Benson – guitar, lead vocals
- Lee Ritenour – guitar
- Abraham Laboriel – bass guitar
- John Robinson – drums
- Herbie Hancock – electric piano
- Richard Tee – synthesizer bass
- Michael Boddicker – synthesizer
- Paulinho da Costa – percussion
- Patti Austin, Diva Gray, Jocelyn Brown, Tom Bahler, Jim Gilstrap – background vocals
- Jerry Hey – trumpet, string and horn arrangements
- Kim Hutchcroft, Larry Williams – saxophone, flute
- Quincy Jones – producer, rhythm arrangements
- Rod Temperton – songwriter, rhythm and vocal arrangements

== Charts ==
=== Weekly charts ===
Chart (1980)	Peak position
Australia (Kent Music Report)	10
Belgium (Ultratop 50 Flanders)	11
Canada Top Singles (RPM)	22
France (IFOP)	3
Ireland (IRMA)	15
Netherlands (Dutch Top 40)	8
Netherlands (Single Top 100)	9
New Zealand (Recorded Music NZ)	4
Norway (VG-lista)	8
South Africa (Springbok Radio)	5
Switzerland (Schweizer Hitparade)	7
UK Singles (Official Charts)	7
US Billboard Hot 100	4
US Hot Disco Singles (Billboard)	2
US Hot Soul Singles (Billboard)	1
US Adult Contemporary (Billboard)	26
US Cash Box Top 100	6
US Record World Singles	6

=== Year-end charts ===
Chart (1980)	Rank
Australia (Kent Music Report)	91
Belgium (Ultratop 50 Flanders)	86
Netherlands (Dutch Top 40)	83
Netherlands (Single Top 100)	72
US Billboard Hot 100	91
US Cash Box Top 100	41

== Certifications ==
Region	Certification	Certified units/sales
New Zealand (RMNZ)	Gold	10,000^{*}
United Kingdom (BPI)	Gold	400,000^{‡}
^{*} Sales figures based on certification alone.^{‡} Sales+streaming figures based on certification alone.

== Randy Crawford version ==
"Give Me the Night"

Single by Randy Crawford

from the album Naked and True
- Released: 31 December 1996
- Recorded: 1995
- Genre: Deep house; R&B
- Length: 5:06
- Label: WEA
- Songwriter: Rod Temperton
- Producer: Ralf Droesemeyer

Randy Crawford singles chronology
"Why Can't We Take a Chance" (1994)	"Give Me the Night" (1996)	"Cajun Moon" (1996)

In 1995, American jazz and R&B singer Randy Crawford recorded a cover version of "Give Me the Night" which appeared on her 12th album, Naked and True (1995). It was produced by Ralf Droesemeyer and released as a single by WEA. Compared to the original, which is a post-disco song, Crawford's version is a deep house song. In addition to the studio album, it is also included on The Best of Randy Crawford & Friends and Brigitte Musik – Jazz For Dinner 4 compilations. The bridge is not sung in this version.

=== Critical reception ===
Pan-European magazine Music & Media wrote, "George Benson's biggest hit, dusted off with an oldfashioned disco groove that will keep your feet tapping and your hips shaking. The jazzy guitar solo in this Radio Mix equals Benson's own fluid style. Big in the German club charts and receiving steady airplay in France."

=== Charts ===
Chart (1996–97)	Peak position
UK Singles (OCC)	60
US R&B Singles (Billboard)	47
US Dance/Club Play Singles (Billboard)	39

== Uses and samples ==
- The song is used as a sample in "Je danse le Mia" by French hip hop band IAM.
- The song is parodied as "Le Casse de Brice" in the French film Brice de Nice.

== See also ==
- List of Hot Soul Singles number ones of 1980
