= A Lot That You Can Do =

"A Lot That You Can Do" is a song by American singer Randy Crawford, which was written by German composer team Klarmann/Weber and produced by Michael Powell.

Included on Crawford's album Through the Eyes of Love, the song was released as a single in 1992, reaching No. 74 on the US Billboard R&B chart.
