= This Time Make It Funky =

Single by Tracie Spencer

from the album Make the Difference
- Released: May 1, 1991
- Recorded: 1990
- Studio: Cherokee Studios
- Genre: Pop; R&B; new jack swing; hip hop
- Length: 5:26
- Label: Capitol
- Songwriters: C. Carlisle; Matt Sherrod; Paul Sherrod; Sir Spence
- Producers: Matt Sherrod; Paul Sherrod

Tracie Spencer singles chronology
"This House" (1990)	"This Time Make It Funky" (1991)	"Tender Kisses" (1991)

"This Time Make It Funky" is a 1991 song by American singer–songwriter Tracie Spencer. This song is the third single from Spencer's second album, Make the Difference which was released in August of the previous year. The single was released on May 1, 1991. As stated in the title, the track samples many different hip-hop beats and rhythms as Spencer tells the DJ (Sir Spence) to "drop the bass...and make it funky".

== Chart information ==
"This Time Make It Funky" reached No. 54 on the Billboard Hot 100 and No. 31 on the R&B Singles chart.

== Music video ==
The 7" Mix was used for the music video. The music video begins with Spencer and dancers entering through a side door of a building. It features Spencer singing the song and Sir Spence performing his rap accompanied by dancers and light effects in the background.

== Official versions/remixes ==
- LP Version – (5:27)
- Radio Mix – (4:26)
- 7" Mix – (4:35)
- Extended Instrumental – (5:44)
- Extended Mix – (6:36)
- Short & Funky Mix – (3:59)
- T-Funk II – (5:38)
- Funky Guitar Mix – (5:37)

== Charts ==
Chart (1991)	Peak position
Australia (ARIA)	163
Canada Dance/Urban (RPM)	4
New Zealand (Recorded Music NZ)	48
US Billboard Hot 100	54
US Dance Club Songs (Billboard)	13
US Dance Singles Sales (Billboard)	32
US Hot R&B/Hip-Hop Songs (Billboard)	31
