= Almaz (song) =

Single by Randy Crawford

from the album Abstract Emotions
- B-side: "Desire" (edit)
- Released: November 1986
- Recorded: 1986
- Genre: Soul
- Length: 4:07
- Label: Warner Bros.
- Songwriter: Randy Crawford
- Producer: Reggie Lucas

Randy Crawford singles chronology
"Everybody Needs a Little Rain" (1986)	"Almaz" (1986)	"Knockin' on Heaven's Door" (1989)

"Almaz" is a single by American female soul singer Randy Crawford, which was recorded in 1986. The song reached number four in the UK Singles Chart.

"Almaz" is one of the few songs Randy Crawford has written by herself, and the first of her own compositions that was released as a single.

== Composition ==
"Almaz" was written about a couple of Eritrean refugees who were neighbors of Crawford's. The man asked Crawford to write a song about his wife, who was named Almaz (which means "diamond" in Tigrinya, Amharic, Arabic and a number of other languages). In the song, the singer reflects on their rare form of love. In Crawford's own words, "I witnessed this perfect love affair between them, although she was considerably younger than him. This beautiful couple with their baby. As refugees they were looking for 'a world where love survives'."

== Release and reception ==
"Almaz" was released as the third single off the Abstract Emotions album, in November 1986. The first two singles had failed to have any major impact. "Almaz" entered the UK chart on 22 November 1986 at number 91, and slowly climbed the chart until peaking at number 4 in February 1987, spending 17 weeks on the chart. It is Crawford's longest run on the UK chart, and was her first top 40 hit in the UK since 1981's "Rainy Night in Georgia". The song was also a top 10 hit in the Irish chart, peaking at number 2. "Almaz" was released in continental Europe but it failed to chart there. It was never released as a single in the US. The song reached #7 on the Billboard Japan chart on June 24, 1991.

== Charts ==
Chart (1986)	Peak position
UK Singles Chart	4
Irish Singles Chart	2
Billboard Japan	7
