= Rich and Poor (album) =

Studio album by Randy Crawford
- Released: 1989
- Studio: Maison Rouge Studios, London, England; Power Plant Studios, London, England
- Genre: R&B, soul
- Length: 46:40
- Label: Warner Bros.
- Producer: Michael J. Powell; Robin Millar

Randy Crawford chronology
Abstract Emotions (1986)	Rich and Poor (1989)	Through the Eyes of Love (1992)

Singles from Secret Combination
- 1. "Knockin' on Heaven's Door"; 2. "Wrap-U-Up"; 3. "I Don't Feel Much Like Crying"; 4. "Cigarette in the Rain"

Professional ratings
Review scores
Source	Rating
AllMusic	4/5 stars

Rich and Poor is a studio album by American R&B singer Randy Crawford, released in 1989 on Warner Records. The album reached No. 19 on the US Billboard Top R&B Albums chart and No. 4 on the Billboard Top Contemporary Jazz Albums chart.

== Critical reception ==
AllMusic awarded the album a four out of five star rating.

== Track listing ==
Rich and Poor track listing
1	Knockin' on Heaven's Door	Bob Dylan	4:57
2	Every Kinda People	Andy Fraser	3:45
3	Wrap-U-Up	Ken Gold, Maggie Ryder	4:34
4	This Is the Love	Sharon Robinson	4:42
5	Separate Lives	Helen Chappelle	4:11
6	Believe That Love Can Change the World	Torstein Bieler	3:46
7	Rich and Poor	Robin Millar, Colin Vearncombe	4:24
8	Cigarette in the Rain	Barry Coffing, Ruth McCartney	3:56
9	Love Is	Ken Gold, Billy Ocean	4:28
10	I Don't Feel Much Like Crying	Babyface, L.A.	4:58
11	All It Takes Is Love	Barry Coffing / Randy Crawford	2:59

== Charts ==
Chart (1989)	Peak position
US Billboard Top R&B Albums	19
US Billboard Top Contemporary Jazz Albums	2
