= Gary Smith (television producer) =

American television producer (1935–2025)

- Born: January 7, 1935
- Died: July 19, 2025 (aged 90)
- Occupations: Television producer, director, writer, art director
- Known for: Smith–Hemion Productions

Gary Smith (January 8, 1935 – July 19, 2025) was an American television producer, director, writer, and art director. As a partner in the television production company Smith–Hemion, with TV Director Dwight Hemion, Smith produced many distinguished specials and events. The team won a total of 24 Emmy Awards.

== Career ==
A graduate of Carnegie Tech's Theatre Department with a degree in Scenic Design, Gary Smith became the producer of The Judy Garland Show in 1963.

Smith served as Executive Producer of six Tony Awards telecasts from 1993 through 1997, as well as the 55th, 56th and 57th Annual Tony Awards and the two most recent Emmy Awards during his tenure. He was responsible for the production of the Democratic National Convention in 1988, 1992, 1996, and 2000; Baryshnikov on Broadway; an adaptation of Peter Pan starring Mia Farrow and Danny Kaye; four years of the Emmy Awards; three years of the People's Choice Awards; and five years of the AFI "100 Years" specials.

He produced ABC's 24-Hour Millennium coverage; Command Performances for the Queen of England; and television specials for Frank Sinatra, Luciano Pavarotti, the Apollo Theatre, Woody Allen, and Radio City Music Hall. He produced President Reagan's Inaugural Gala in 1985 and President Clinton's in 1993 and 1997.

Smith was Executive Producer for most of Barbra Streisand's specials, including the May 2, 2001 telecast of her AFI Life Achievement Award, as well as the AFI Life Achievement Award honoring Tom Hanks, the I Love Lucy 50th Anniversary, and The Mary Tyler Moore Show Reunion.

In 2003, he served as Executive Producer on 100 Years of Hope and Humor, which honored Bob Hope's 100th birthday. In 2009, he produced the opening ceremonies for the Special Olympic World Winter Games held in Boise, Idaho.

== Death ==
Smith died on July 19, 2025 at his home in Los Angeles. He was 90 years old.

== Notable Credits ==
=== As Producer ===
- Homeward Bound Telethon (2013)
- Emmy's Greatest Moments (2004)
- I Love Lucy's 50th Anniversary Special (2001)
- ABC 2000: The Millennium (1999)
- AFI's 100 Years...100 Movies series (1998–2008)
- Barbra Streisand: The Concert (1994)
- Tony Awards (1993–2003)
- The Star Wars Holiday Special (1978)

=== As Director ===
- AFI’s 100 Years...100 Cheers (2006)
- AFI’s 100 Years...100 Songs (2004)
- 45th Annual L.A. Holiday Celebration (2004)
- Snowden on Ice (1997)

=== As Writer ===
- AFI's 100 Years...100 Movies (1998)
- 50 Years of Television (1997)
- The People's Choice Awards (1991)
- Neil Diamond: Greatest Hits Live (1988)

=== As Art Director ===
- The Judy Garland Show (1962)

== Legacy and recognition ==
Gary Smith was recognized throughout his career with numerous accolades, particularly from the Television Academy, earning over 30 Emmy nominations and multiple wins.

=== Emmy Awards and Nominations ===
Wins

- 1998 – Outstanding Variety, Music or Comedy Special – The 1997 Tony Awards (CBS)
- 1995 – Outstanding Variety, Music or Comedy Special – Barbra Streisand: The Concert (HBO)
- 1979 – Outstanding Comedy-Variety or Music Program – Steve & Eydie Celebrate Irving Berlin (NBC)
- 1978 – Outstanding Special – Comedy-Variety or Music – Bette Midler: Ol’ Red Hair Is Back (NBC)
- 1971 – Outstanding Single Program – Variety or Musical – Singer Presents Burt Bacharach (CBS)
- 1962 – Outstanding Achievement in Art Direction and Scenic Design – Perry Como's Kraft Music Hall (NBC)

Notable Nominations

- 2008 – AFI's 100 Years...100 Movies – 10th Anniversary Edition
- 2007 – AFI's 100 Years...100 Cheers
- 2004 – AFI's 100 Years...100 Heroes & Villains
- 2003 – AFI's 100 Years...100 Passions
- 2003 – 100 Years of Hope and Humor
- 2002 – AFI's 100 Years...100 Thrills
- 2002 – I Love Lucy 50th Anniversary Special
- 2000 – Disney’s Young Musicians Symphony Orchestra
- 1997 – The 50th Annual Tony Awards
- 1997 – John F. Kennedy Center 25th Anniversary Celebration
- 1995 – Disney's Young Musicians Symphony Orchestra
- 1994 – The Tony Awards
- 1993 – Disney's Young Musicians Symphony Orchestra
- 1988 – The 14th Annual People's Choice Awards
- 1983 – The Winds of War
- 1977 – Peter Pan (Hallmark Hall of Fame)
- 1977 – The Neil Diamond Special
- 1976 – Steve and Eydie: Our Love is Here to Stay
- 1974 – Barbra Streisand...And Other Musical Instruments
- 1971 – Another Evening With Burt Bacharach
- 1968 – Herb Alpert and the Tijuana Brass
- 1964 – The Judy Garland Show
- 1961 – Perry Como's Kraft Music Hall

== Personal life ==
Smith was married to his wife, Maxine, with whom he had two children. He had three other children from a previous marriage.
