= Permanent/Play Mode =

Studio album by Randy Crawford
- Released: February 13, 2001
- Studio: Nomis Studios, London, England
- Genre: Soul music, smooth jazz
- Length: 52:59
- Label: Warner Bros.
- Producer: Peter Smith

Randy Crawford chronology
Every Kind of Mood — Randy, Randi, Randee (2000)	Permanent/Play Mode (2001)	Feeling Good (2006)

Permanent (US) or Play Mode (Europe) is a studio album by Randy Crawford, released in 2001 by Warner Records and produced by Peter Smith. The album peaked at No. 14 on the US Billboard Top Jazz Albums chart, No. 9 on the US Billboard Top Contemporary Jazz Albums chart, and No. 13 on the German Pop Albums chart.

== Critical reception ==
Professional ratings
Review scores
Source	Rating
AllMusic	4/5 stars

AllMusic rated the album 4 out of 5 stars. Billboard labeled the album as a "Critic's Choice".

== Singles ==
"Permanent" reached number 32 on the US Billboard Adult R&B Songs chart.

== Track listing ==
1	Wild Is the Wind	Dimitri Tiomkin, Ned Washington	03:22
2	Merry Go Round	Multiman	03:42
3	Free the Child	Peter Smith	04:21
4	Permanent	Albert Hammond	03:38
5	Sweetest Thing	Peter Smith	04:15
6	Fire and Rain	Peter Smith	04:03
7	When I Get over You	Brian Foreman, Ken Foreman	05:44
8	Alfie	Burt Bacharach, Hal David	03:24
9	When the Evening Comes	Judy Cheeks, Simon Ellis, Steve Lee	04:21
10	All I Do	Morris Broadnax, Clarence Paul, Stevie Wonder	04:14
11	When Will I Be Free of Love's Taboo	Randy Crawford	03:21
12	Tell It to Your Heart	Burt Bacharach	04:10
13	I Get a Little Burned	Albert Hammond	04:24
