= Naked and True =

Studio album by Randy Crawford
- Released: November 1995
- Studio: Big House Studio; Chocolate City; Peppermint Park
- Genre: Soul; smooth jazz
- Length: 1:05:49
- Label: Bluemoon/Atlantic
- Producer: Ralf Droesemeyer

Randy Crawford chronology
Don't Say It's Over (1993)	Naked and True (1995)	Every Kind of Mood — Randy, Randi, Randee (1998)

Naked and True is a studio album by Randy Crawford released in 1995 by Bluemoon/Atlantic Records. The album peaked at No. 4 on the Billboard Top Jazz Albums chart and No. 3 on the Billboard Top Contemporary Jazz Albums chart.

== Overview ==
Naked and True was produced by Ralf Droesemeyer. Artists such as Fred Wesley, Bootsy Collins and Bernie Worrell are featured on the album.

== Critical reception ==
Professional ratings
Review scores
Source	Rating
AllMusic	3/5 stars

With a 3 out of 5 star rating, Alex Henderson of AllMusic wrote "Naked and True often sounds dated, but dated in a good sense — if you consider the late '70s and early '80s a great period for R&B, you'll find a lot to like about this enjoyable, if less than essential, CD."

== Singles ==
Crawford's cover of "Give Me the Night" reached No. 9 on the UK Dance Singles chart and No. 14 on the US Billboard Adult R&B Songs chart. Another cover, this of "Cajun Moon", reached No. 26 on the US Billboard Adult R&B Songs chart. Her rendition of "Forget Me Nots" reached No. 35 on the UK R&B Singles chart.

== Track listing ==
1	Cajun Moon	J. J. Cale	04:02
2	Give Me the Night	Rod Temperton	05:06
3	The Glow of Love	Wayne Garfield, Mauro Malavasi, David Romani	07:38
4	Purple Rain	Prince	05:49
5	Forget Me Nots	Patrice Rushen, "Ready" Freddie Washington"	05:46
6	I'll Be Around	Thom Bell, Phil Hurtt	03:50
7	Joy Inside My Tears	Stevie Wonder	05:53
8	Come into My Life	Joyce Sims	07:10
9	What a Diff'rence a Day Makes	María Mendez Grever	05:52
10	Holding Back the Years	Mick Hucknall, Neil Moss	05:25
11	All the King's Horses	Aretha Franklin	04:27
12	Give Me the Night	Rod Temperton	04:51
