= One Day I'll Fly Away =

1980 single by Randy Crawford

Single by Randy Crawford

from the album Now We May Begin
- B-side: "Blue Flame"; "Last Night at Danceland"; "Tender Falls the Rain"
- Released: 1980
- Genre: Soul
- Length: 5:02
- Label: Warner Bros.
- Songwriters: Joe Sample, Will Jennings
- Producers: Joe Sample, Wilton Felder, Stix Hooper

Randy Crawford singles chronology
"Last Night at Danceland" (1980)	"One Day I'll Fly Away" (1980)	"People Alone" (1981)

"One Day I'll Fly Away" is a song performed by American R&B and jazz singer Randy Crawford, from her fourth studio album, Now We May Begin (1980). The song was written by Joe Sample and Will Jennings and produced by Sample, Wilton Felder and Stix Hooper. It received generally favorable reviews from music critics. The song was a commercial success in the international market at the time, reaching number one in Belgium (Flanders) and Netherlands, while peaking at number two in the United Kingdom.

"One Day I'll Fly Away" is Crawford's highest charting single, and has been covered by many artists, including by Nicole Kidman portraying the character of Satine in the 2001 motion picture Moulin Rouge!. In 2013, Girls Aloud member Kimberley Walsh released a cover of the song as the lead single from her debut studio album, Centre Stage. British electronic trio Vaults's cover version of the song was featured in the John Lewis 2016 Christmas advertisement.

== Composition and reception ==
"One Day I'll Fly Away" was written by Joe Sample and Will Jennings, and produced by Sample, Wilton Felder and Stix Hooper. The main hook (in which the singer sings the title of the song) is itself an interpolation of Tchaikovsky's Waltz of the Flowers from his ballet, The Nutcracker. Jon O'Brien of Allmusic said that the song showcases Crawford's "sumptuous, soulful tones."

Writing about the singer's life for The Daily Telegraph, critic Helen Brown said that "in the pouty world of the jazz chanteuse, Randy Crawford's smile is unique," adding that "even on the saddest of songs, A Rainy Night in Georgia or One Day I'll Fly Away, you could hear those trembling lips spread outwards and upwards through the tears." "One Day I'll Fly Away" achieved widespread radio airplay and did well in the international market. It is Crawford's highest charting single. On September 20, 1980, the song reached number two on the UK Singles Chart. It also performed well in Belgium (Flanders) and Netherlands, reaching number one in both countries.

== Formats and track listings ==
- Germany 7"
1. "One Day I'll Fly Away" – 4:21
2. "Blue Flame" – 6:25
- Japan 7"
1. "One Day I'll Fly Away" – 3:40
2. "Tender Falls the Rain" – 4:13
- Netherlands 12"
1. "One Day I'll Fly Away" – 5:00
2. "Last Night at Danceland" – 4:53

== Charts ==
=== Weekly charts ===
Chart (1980)	Peak position
Belgium (Ultratop 50 Flanders)	1
Netherlands (Dutch Top 40)	1
Netherlands (Single Top 100)	1
UK Singles (Official Charts)	2

=== Year-end charts ===
Chart (1980)	Position
Belgium (Ultratop Flanders)	24
Netherlands (Dutch Top 40)	20
Netherlands (Single Top 100)	21
United Kingdom	29

== Nicole Kidman version ==
"One Day I'll Fly Away"

Single by Nicole Kidman

from the album Moulin Rouge! Vol. 2
- B-side: Instrumental, "Your Song"
- Released: April 5, 2002
- Recorded: 2001
- Length: 5:09
- Label: Interscope
- Songwriters: Joe Sample, Will Jennings
- Producers: BLAM, Craig Armstrong, Josh G Abrahams, Marius de Vries

Nicole Kidman singles chronology
"Somethin' Stupid" (2001)	"One Day I'll Fly Away" (2002)

Music video
- "One Day I'll Fly Away" on YouTube

In 2001, "One Day I'll Fly Away" was recorded by Nicole Kidman for the motion picture Moulin Rouge!, in which she portrayed the character of Satine. A special remix designed by Tony Phillips was promoted as a single, issued by Interscope on April 5, 2002.

=== Credits and personnel ===
- Nicole Kidman – lead vocal
- Joe Sample – writer
- Will Jennings – writer
- Craig Armstrong – producer, arrangement
- Baz Luhrmann – producer
- Anton Monsted – producer
- Josh G Abrahams – producer
- Marius de Vries – producer
- Tony Phillips – remix
- Geoff Foster – remix engineer
- Andy Bradfield – mix
- Simon Franglen – producer/engineer [additional vocal]

=== Track listings ===
- CD single, UK, 497 703-2
1. "One Day I'll Fly Away" (Tony Phillips Remix) - 5:11
2. "One Day I'll Fly Away" (Original Album Version) - 3:17
3. "Your Song" (Instrumental from the Rehearsal Montage Scene) - 2:28
- CD maxi, Europe, 497 684-2
1. "One Day I'll Fly Away" (Tony Phillips Remix) - 5:11
2. "One Day I'll Fly Away" (Original Album Version) - 3:17
3. "One Day I'll Fly Away" (Instrumental) - 3:16
4. "Your Song" (Instrumental from the Rehearsal Montage Scene) - 2:28
- CD single, Europe, promo, MOULINCDP4
1. "One Day I'll Fly Away" (Tony Phillips Remix - Radio Edit) - 3:42
2. "One Day I'll Fly Away" (Original Album Version) - 3:17
- CD single, US, promo, INTR 10610-2
1. "One Day I'll Fly Away" (Original Album Version) - 3:17

== Kimberley Walsh version ==
"One Day I'll Fly Away"

Single by Kimberley Walsh

from the album Centre Stage
- Released: January 4, 2013
- Recorded: 2012
- Genre: Musical theatre
- Length: 3:43
- Label: Decca
- Songwriters: Joe Sample, Will Jennings
- Producers: Per Magnusson, David Kreuger

Kimberley Walsh singles chronology
"One Vision" (2012)	"One Day I'll Fly Away" (2013)

Music video
- "One Day I'll Fly Away" on YouTube

=== Background and release ===
Following her solo endeavours and musical theatre performances, Girls Aloud member Kimberley Walsh decided to record a studio album featuring her own renditions of popular hits from musicals, commenting that "I've always loved musical theatre and doing Shrek the Musical definitely reignited the passion in me." For the album, Walsh commented that she wanted "to share the love I have for musical theatre by taking some classic songs and completely reinventing them. The melodies in so many musical songs are so brilliant, I knew we could create something special by experimenting with the production, and I really feel like we've come up with some interesting takes on classic songs."

On December 21, 2012, "One Day I'll Fly Away" premiered in full through the label's official SoundCloud account. The song was recorded in Stockholm, Sweden and produced by Per Magnusson and David Kreuger. It was officially released on January 4, 2013, as the lead single from Centre Stage through digital download under Decca Records. Along with the album version, the digital release of "One Day I'll Fly Away" includes the Radio Edit and The Alias Club Mix. Peter Robinson of Popjustice compared the latter to Psy's Gangnam Style (2012).

=== Music video and live performances ===
The accompanying music video was directed by Paul Caslin and produced by Amy James through production company JJ Stereo. It was shot in 2K on an Arri Alexa on January 4, 2013, at Pinewood Studios, with 4music publishing behind-the-scenes pictures of the shooting session. The lyric video premiered on January 12, 2013, through VEVO, while the music video premiered on January 17, 2013. It features Walsh performing the song in different settings, until she is joined by Pasha Kovalev and they perform a ballet number. On January 23, 2013, Walsh performed "One Day I'll Fly Away" at the National Television Awards, and on February 2, 2013, at G.A.Y.

=== Track listing ===
- Digital download
1. "One Day I'll Fly Away" – 3:43
2. "One Day I'll Fly Away" (Radio Edit) – 3:28
3. "One Day I'll Fly Away" (The Alias Club Mix) – 6:22

=== Release history ===
Region	Date	Format	Label
Brazil	January 4, 2013	Digital download	Decca Records
Ireland	January 4, 2013	Digital download	Decca Records
United Kingdom	January 4, 2013	Digital download	Decca Records

== Cover versions and samples ==
Shirley Bassey released a cover of the song on her 1996 album The Show Must Go On. Dutch symphonic metal band After Forever covered the song and released it on Exordium (2003). Gospel singer Ruben Studdard released a cover as a Wal-Mart-exclusive bonus track on his fourth album, Love Is (2009). The opening bars of "One Day I'll Fly Away" have also appeared on the 2010 Leaving Certificate Music Listening exam in Ireland, as an unprepared Aural Awareness excerpt on Q6. Italian singer Bianca Atzei covered the song and released it as a single on December 9, 2013.

British soprano Sarah Brightman recorded an operatic version of the song, but it was not available on either CD or as a digital download until 2015, when her version was included in the first of the three volumes of the digital download Rarities (hence her "Test version"). British electronic trio Vaults covered the song for the John Lewis 2016 Christmas advertisement.
