= Everything Must Change (Randy Crawford album) =

Studio album by Randy Crawford
- Released: 1976
- Studio: Hit Factory, New York; Hollywood Sound Recorders
- Genre: Jazz
- Length: 38:03
- Label: Warner Bros.
- Producer: Stewart Levine

Randy Crawford chronology
Everything Must Change (1976)	Miss Randy Crawford (1977)

Professional ratings
Review scores
Source	Rating
AllMusic	3/5 stars

Everything Must Change is the debut studio album by singer Randy Crawford, released in 1976 on the Warner Bros. label.

== Background ==
It was recorded and mixed at Hollywood Sound Recorders except "I'm Easy" and "I've Never Been to Me", which, along with all horns and strings, were recorded at The Hit Factory, New York City, and engineered by Kevin Herron with assistant engineer Ted Spencer. "Everything Must Change" and "Gonna Give Lovin' a Try" were recorded live at the World Jazz Association's first recorded concert at the Shrine Auditorium in Los Angeles in November 1975.

== Track listing ==
1. "Everything Must Change" (Benard Ighner) - 4:52
2. "I Let You Walk Away" (Neil Sedaka, Phil Cody) - 3:20
3. "I'm Easy" (Keith Carradine) - 3:41
4. "I Had to See You One More Time" (Norma Helms, Ken Hirsch) - 3:40
5. "I've Never Been to Me" (Ron Miller, Ken Hirsch) - 3:32
6. "Don't Let Me Down" (John Lennon, Paul McCartney) - 3:56
7. "Something So Right" (Paul Simon) - 4:12
8. "Soon as I Touched Him" (Norma Helms, Ken Hirsch) - 3:11
9. "Only Your Love Song Lasts" (Art Munson, Stephen Kalinich) - 4:06
10. "Gonna Give Lovin' a Try" (Diane Lampert, Peter Farrow, Nathaniel Adderley, Julian Adderley) - 3:24

== Personnel ==
- Randy Crawford - vocals

The World Jazz Association All Star Band

- Joe Sample, Pat Rebillot - keyboards
- Robert Popwell, Anthony Jackson - bass guitar
- James Gadson, Rick Marotta - drums
- Larry Carlton - acoustic guitar
- Jay Graydon, Eric Gale, Dean Parks - electric guitar
- Ralph MacDonald - percussion
- Hugh McCracken - electric guitar, harmonica
- Harold Vick - tenor saxophone
- Hugh Masekela - flugelhorn
- Alfred Brown, Gene Orloff, Harry Lookofsky, Harry Cykman, Joseph Malignaggi, Sanford Allen, Marvin Morganstern, Guy Lumia, Max Pollikof, Selwart Clarke, Jesse Levy, Kermit Moore - strings
- Seldon Powell, William Slapin, Virgil Jones, Charles Williams, Harold Vick, Joseph Shepley, David Carey, Wayne Andre - horns

== Production ==
- Arrangers - Larry Carlton, William Eaton, Jimmy Jones
- Produced by Stewart Levine for Outside Productions Inc.
- Engineered and remixed by Rik Pekkonen
- Photography - Lisa Powers
- Design - Vartan Kurjian, Stan Evenson
