= Secret Combination (Randy Crawford album) =

Studio album by Randy Crawford
- Released: March 1981
- Recorded: April–May 1980
- Studio: Sound Labs (Hollywood); Capitol (Hollywood)
- Genre: R&B, soul
- Length: 39:27
- Label: Warner Bros.
- Producer: Tommy LiPuma

Randy Crawford chronology
Now We May Begin (1980)	Secret Combination (1981)	Windsong (1982)

Singles from Secret Combination
- 1. "When I Lose My Way" Released: April 18, 1981; 2. "You Might Need Somebody" Released: May 30, 1981; 3. "Rainy Night in Georgia" Released: August 8, 1981; 4. "Secret Combination" Released: October 31, 1981

Secret Combination is an album by the American R&B singer Randy Crawford, released in 1981 on Warner Bros. Records.

The album reached No. 12 in the US Billboard Top R&B Albums chart in July 1981, and No. 2 in the UK Albums Chart in July 1981. The singles "You Might Need Somebody" and "Rainy Night in Georgia" reached No. 11 and No. 18, respectively, in the UK Singles Chart.

== Reception ==
Professional ratings
Review scores
Source	Rating
AllMusic	4/5 stars

The Globe and Mail wrote that Crawford "manages to sing in every style from jazz to blues to middle-of-the-road to country, and makes it all sound wonderfully unique."

AllMusic awarded the album with four stars and its review by Ron Wynn states: "Randy Crawford made even more noise on the urban contemporary and R&B front in 1981 with this album, one of her most successful ever from a chart and hit standpoint". In February 1982, Crawford won the award for Best British Female Solo Artist at the 1982 Brit Awards.

== Track listing ==
1. "You Might Need Somebody" (Tom Snow, Nan O'Byrne) — 4:17
2. "Rainy Night in Georgia" (Tony Joe White) — 4:21
3. "That's How Heartaches Are Made" (Ben Raleigh, Bob Halley) — 2:55
4. "Two Lives" (Mark T. Jordan) — 3:47
5. "You Bring the Sun Out" (Tom Snow, Jessie Dixon) — 3:47
6. "Rio de Janeiro Blue" (Richard Torrance, John Haeny) — 4:16
7. "Secret Combination" (Tom Snow, Franne Golde) — 3:23
8. "When I Lose My Way" (Turley Richards) — 3:43
9. "Time for Love" (Leon Russell) — 4:15
10. "Trade Winds" (Ralph MacDonald, William Salter) — 4:58

== Personnel ==
- Leon Pendarvis – keyboards and arrangements
- Abraham Laboriel – bass guitar
- Jeff Porcaro – drums
- Steve Lukather – guitar
- Dean Parks – guitar
- Lenny Castro – percussion
- Robben Ford – electric guitar on "Two Lives"
- Ernie Watts – flute on "Rio de Janeiro Blue"
- Neil Larsen – organ on "When I Lose My Way", "Trade Winds" and "Rainy Night in Georgia"
- Larry Williams and Bill Reichenbach – horn arrangements on "When I Lose My Way"
- Bill Reichenbach – horn arrangements on "You Might Need Somebody"
- Horn Section
  - Larry Williams
  - Bill Reichenbach
  - Gary Herbig
  - Jim Horn
  - Chuck Findley
- Background Vocals
  - Phyllis St. James
  - Marti McCall
  - Petsye Powell
  - Alphanette Silas
- Al Schmitt – engineering, mixing
- Don Henderson, Stewart Whitmore – assistant engineers
- Tommy LiPuma – production
- Mike Reese – vinyl mastering
- Lee Herschberg – CD mastering

== Charts ==
Year	Chart	Position
1981	US Top R&B Albums (Billboard)	12
1982	UK Albums Chart	2

== Certifications ==
Region	Certification	Certified units/sales
Australia (ARIA)	Gold	35,000^{^}
United Kingdom (BPI)	2× Platinum	600,000^{^}
^{^} Shipments figures based on certification alone.
