= Nightline (album) =

Studio album by Randy Crawford
- Released: 1983
- Studios: Bill Schnee; Lion Share; Ocean Way; The Village Recorder; Room 335; Sunset Sound (all in Los Angeles)
- Genres: Soul, pop rock
- Length: 40:00
- Label: Warner Bros.
- Producer: Tommy LiPuma

Randy Crawford chronology
Windsong (1982)	Nightline (1983)	Abstract Emotions (1986)

Nightline is an album by the American soul singer Randy Crawford. It was released in 1983 via Warner Bros. Records.

The album peaked at No. 164 on the Billboard 200. It peaked at No. 37 on the UK Albums Chart. The title track peaked at No. 51 on the UK Singles Chart. Crawford supported the album by setting up a toll-free telephone number that hosted a recording of the title track.

== Production ==
The album was produced by Tommy LiPuma; among Crawford's backing musicians were members of Toto.

== Critical reception ==
Professional ratings
Review scores
Source	Rating
AllMusic	3/5 stars
The Encyclopedia of Popular Music	3/5 stars
MusicHound R&B: The Essential Album Guide	2.5/5 stars
The Philadelphia Inquirer	4/5 stars

The Philadelphia Inquirer wrote: "Nightline has a smooth, creamy sound that never turns mushy. For the first time, Crawford's authoritative vocals sustain a whole album, giving shape and power to pretty material. A real surprise." The Arizona Republic noted that "Crawford's voice sometimes gets a little thin in the softer passages with crescendos occasionally coming too quickly or spottily."

AllMusic called the album "a nice combination of jazzy, sophisticated ballads, a few harder-hitting numbers, and some heartache material."

== Track listing ==
No.	Title	Writer(s)	Length
1.	"Nightline"	Brie Howard, Davey Faragher, Glen Ballard	3:47
2.	"Living on the Outside"	Frank Musker, Michael Sembello	3:36
3.	"Why"	Pino Donaggio	3:30
4.	"Bottom Line"	Musker, Stephen Geering	4:05
5.	"In Real Life"	Bill LaBounty, Steve Goodman	4:06
6.	"Happy Feet"	Cecil Womack, Linda Womack	4:53
7.	"This 'Ole Heart of Mine"	C. Womack, L. Womack	3:58
8.	"Lift Me Up"	C. Womack, L. Womack	4:26
9.	"Ain't No Foolin'"	C. Womack, L. Womack	3:51
10.	"Go On and Live it Up"	Randy Crawford	3:33

== Personnel ==
- Randy Crawford – vocals
- James Newton Howard – keyboards, string arrangement, rhythm arrangements (3, 4), synthesizer (3, 6), synthesizer arrangements (6)
- Robbie Buchanan – keyboards (1, 2, 5), synthesizer, synth arrangements (1, 2)
- Denzil "Broadway" Miller – keyboards (6–10)
- Cecil Womack – guitar, rhythm arrangements (1–6), background vocals (6, 7, 9, 10)
- David Williams – guitar (2, 5)
- Steve Lukather – rhythm guitar (1)
- Dann Huff – guitar solo (2)
- Larry Carlton – guitar solo (4)
- Nathan East – bass guitar (1–5)
- Abe Laboriel – bass guitar (6–10)
- Bill Cuomo – bass synthesizer (6)
- John Robinson – drums (1, 2, 5)
- Jeff Porcaro – drums (3, 4)
- James Gadson – drums (6–10)
- Reek Havoc Simmons – drums (6)
- Lenny Castro – percussion (all tracks)
- Dale Oehler – string arrangements (7–10)
- Nick De Caro – contractor, string arrangements (7–10)
- Ivy Scoff, Jan Abbazia – contractor
- Al Schmitt – engineering, mixing
- Tommy LiPuma – production
