= Now We May Begin =

Studio album by Randy Crawford
- Released: 1980
- Studio: Hollywood Sound Recorders, Los Angeles, CA Wizard Recording Studios
- Genre: R&B, soul
- Label: Warner Bros.
- Producer: Wilton Felder, Stix Hooper, Joe Sample

Randy Crawford chronology
Raw Silk (1979)	Now We May Begin (1980)	Secret Combination (1981)

Singles from Now We May Begin
- 1. "One Day I'll Fly Away" Released: 1980

Now We May Begin is an album by the American R&B singer Randy Crawford, released in 1980 on Warner Bros. Records. The album got to No. 10 on the UK Albums Chart and No. 30 on the US Billboard Top R&B Albums chart. Now We May Begin has also been certified Silver in the UK by the BPI.

== Overview ==
The track "One Day I'll Fly Away" was certified silver in the UK by the BPI.

== Critical reception ==
Professional ratings
Review scores
Source	Rating
AllMusic	4/5 stars

Ron Wynn of AllMusic remarked, "The Crusaders produced this '80 album, one of the better Randy Crawford sets."

Jay Harper of The Boston Globe declared, "Just as Donna Summer developed a voice and musical style, so has Crawford, and I believe hers is preferable to Summer's. Now We May Begin is an audiophile's album. There is great diversity of style from straight dance music like 'Blue Flame' to warm ballads like 'Tender Falls the Rain' and the engineering quality is excellent. But the voice, oh the voice, is a killer. While Summer regularly knocks your socks off with power, Crawford seduces you with a voice of raw silk."

== Track listing ==
All tracks composed by Joe Sample and Will Jennings; except where noted.

1. "Last Night at Danceland" – 4:53
2. "Tender Falls the Rain" (Randy Crawford) – 4:13
3. "My Heart is Not as Young as it Used to Be" – 3:51
4. "Now We May Begin" (Joe Sample) – 4:52
5. "Blue Flame" – 6:25
6. "One Day I'll Fly Away" – 5:00
7. "Same Old Story (Same Old Song)" – 4:05
8. "When Your Life Was Low" – 3:20

== Personnel ==
- Mike Baird – drums
- Roland Bautista – guitar
- Oscar Brashear – trumpet
- Eddie "Bongo" Brown – percussion
- Randy Crawford – vocals
- Paulinho da Costa – percussion
- Wilton Felder – bass guitar, producer, tenor saxophone
- Melvin Franklin – background vocals
- Bernie Grundman – mastering
- Stix Hooper – drums, producer
- Tom Hooper – executive assistant
- Abraham Laboriel – bass guitar
- Pamela Hope Lobue – production coordination
- Robert Margouleff – mixing
- Timothy May – guitar
- Gwen Owens – background vocals
- Dean Parks – guitar
- Rick Ruggieri – mixing
- Joe Sample – keyboards, producer, string arrangements
- Norman Seeff – photography
- Richard Seireenim – art direction
- Howard Siegel – mixing
- Jeremy Smith – engineer
- Hill Swimmer – assistant engineer
- Julia Tillman – background vocals
- David T. Walker – guitar
- Maxine Willard Waters – background vocals

== Sales and certifications ==
Certifications for Now We May Begin
Region	Certification	Certified units/sales
Netherlands (NVPI)	Gold	50,000^{^}
United Kingdom (BPI)	Silver	60,000^{^}
^{^} Shipments figures based on certification alone.
