= Knockin' on Heaven's Door =

1973 single by Bob Dylan

Single by Bob Dylan

from the album Pat Garrett & Billy the Kid
- B-side: "Turkey Chase"
- Released: August 1973
- Genre: Folk rock; gospel
- Length: 2:32
- Label: Columbia
- Songwriter: Bob Dylan
- Producer: Gordon Carroll

Bob Dylan singles chronology
"George Jackson" (1971)	"Knockin' on Heaven's Door" (1973)	"A Fool Such as I" (1973)

"Knockin' on Heaven's Door" is a song by the American singer-songwriter Bob Dylan, written for the soundtrack of the 1973 film Pat Garrett and Billy the Kid. Released as a single two months after the film's premiere, it became a worldwide hit, reaching the Top 10 in several countries. The song became one of Dylan's most popular and most performed post-1960s songs, spawning recordings by Eric Clapton, Guns N' Roses, Randy Crawford, and others.

Described by Dylan biographer Clinton Heylin as "an exercise in splendid simplicity", the song features two short verses, the lyrics of which comment directly on the scene in the film for which it was written: the death of a frontier lawman (Slim Pickens) who refers to his wife (Katy Jurado) as "Mama".

It was ranked number 190 in 2004 by Rolling Stone magazine, in their 500 Greatest Songs of All Time, and number 192 in 2010, but excluded from the revised list in 2021.

== Personnel ==
Per Olof Björner:

- Bob Dylan: vocals, guitar
- Roger McGuinn: guitar
- Jim Keltner: drums
- Terry Paul: bass
- Carl Fortina: harmonium
- Carol Hunter: backing vocals
- Donna Weiss: backing vocals
- Brenda Patterson: backing vocals

== Charts ==
=== Weekly charts ===
Chart (1973–2025)	Peak position
Australia (Kent Music Report)	10
Canada Top Singles (RPM)	12
Canada Adult Contemporary (RPM)	6
France (SNEP)	88
Ireland (IRMA)	9
Norway (VG-lista)	3
Sweden (Sverigetopplistan)	54
UK Singles (Official Charts)	14
US Billboard Hot 100	12
US Adult Contemporary (Billboard)	5
US Rock Digital Song Sales (Billboard)	20
US Cash Box Top 100	10
West Germany (GfK)	50

=== Year-end charts ===
Chart (1973)	Position
Australia (Kent Music Report)	92
Canada Top Singles (RPM)	93
US (Joel Whitburn's Pop Annual)	104

== Certifications ==
Region	Certification	Certified units/sales
Denmark (IFPI Danmark)	Gold	45,000^{‡}
Italy (FIMI)	Platinum	70,000^{‡}
New Zealand (RMNZ)	3× Platinum	90,000^{‡}
Spain (Promusicae)	Platinum	60,000^{‡}
United Kingdom (BPI)	Platinum	600,000^{‡}
United States (RIAA)	3× Platinum	3,000,000^{‡}
^{‡} Sales+streaming figures based on certification alone.

== Other Bob Dylan versions ==
According to his website, Dylan has performed the song in concert 460 times between its live debut in 1974 and its last outing in 2003. Some of these versions have appeared on Dylan's live and Bootleg Series albums including:

- Before the Flood
- Bob Dylan at Budokan
- Dylan & the Dead
- The 30th Anniversary Concert Celebration
- MTV Unplugged
- Thirty-Nine Years of Great Concert Performances
- The Rolling Thunder Revue

== Eric Clapton and Arthur Louis versions ==
In January 1975 Eric Clapton played on Arthur Louis's recording of "Knockin' on Heaven's Door" which was arranged in a crossover reggae style. After the recording sessions with Louis, Clapton recorded his own version of the song which was released as a single in August 1975 two weeks after Louis's version. This version was released on Timepieces: The Best of Eric Clapton. Clapton's version made it to No. 38 on the UK charts, but the single was less successful in the U.S. where it failed to chart on the Billboard Hot 100 (although it reached on No. 109 on Cashbox's Looking Ahead chart). Clapton's 1996 boxed set Crossroads 2: Live in the Seventies features a performance of the song recorded in London in April 1977. There were also performances of the song included on the Journeyman (1990) and the One More Car, One More Rider (2003) world tours. Several Clapton compilation albums also feature the song.

== Guns N' Roses versions ==
"Knockin' on Heaven's Door"

Song by Guns N' Roses

from the album Days of Thunder (soundtrack)
- Released: June 26, 1990
- Genre: Hard rock
- Length: 5:36
- Label: Geffen
- Songwriter: Bob Dylan
- Producers: Mike Clink; Guns N' Roses

"Knockin' on Heaven's Door"
- 1992 UK picture sleeve

Single by Guns N' Roses

from the album Use Your Illusion II
- B-side: "Knockin' on Heavens Door" (live)
- Released: May 11, 1992
- Genre: Hard rock
- Length: 5:36
- Label: Uzi Suicide; Geffen
- Songwriter: Bob Dylan
- Producers: Mike Clink; Guns N' Roses

Guns N' Roses singles chronology
"November Rain" (1992)	"Knockin' on Heaven's Door" (1992)	"Yesterdays" (1992)

In 1987, American hard rock band Guns N' Roses started performing the song. A live version of the song was released on the 12-inch single of "Welcome to the Jungle" the same year. They recorded and released a studio version in 1990 for the soundtrack of the film Days of Thunder that reached No. 18 on the US Billboard Album Rock Tracks chart and No. 56 on Canada's RPM 100 Hit Tracks chart.

This studio recording was slightly modified for the band's 1991 album Use Your Illusion II, discarding the responses in the second verse. Released as the second single from the album, it reached No. 2 on the UK Singles Chart and the New Zealand Singles Chart. Elsewhere, the single topped the charts of Portugal, Belgium, and the Netherlands; it was the best-selling song of 1992 in the latter country. In Ireland, where the song also reached No. 1, it became Guns N' Roses' third number-one single as well as their ninth consecutive top-five hit.

Their performance of the song at the Freddie Mercury Tribute Concert in 1992 was used as the B-side for the single release and was also included on their Live Era '87–'93 album, released in 1999. Another version was released on the video Use Your Illusion World Tour – 1992 in Tokyo II. The music video for this version of the song was directed by Andy Morahan.

=== Personnel ===
Guns N' Roses

- Axl Rose – lead vocals
- Slash – lead guitar
- Izzy Stradlin – rhythm guitar
- Duff McKagan – bass
- Matt Sorum – drums
- Dizzy Reed – piano

Guest musicians

- The Waters – backing vocals

=== Charts ===
==== Weekly charts ====
Chart (1990)	Peak position
Canada Top Singles (RPM)	56
US Mainstream Rock Airplay (Billboard)	18

Chart (1992)	Peak position
Australia (ARIA)	12
Austria (Ö3 Austria Top 40)	3
Belgium (Ultratop 50 Flanders)	1
Europe (Eurochart Hot 100)	3
Finland (Suomen virallinen lista)	7
France (SNEP)	7
Germany (GfK)	5
Greece (IFPI)	9
Ireland (IRMA)	1
Italy (Musica e dischi)	9
Netherlands (Dutch Top 40)	1
Netherlands (Single Top 100)	1
New Zealand (Recorded Music NZ)	2
Norway (VG-lista)	6
Portugal (AFP)	1
Sweden (Sverigetopplistan)	10
Switzerland (Schweizer Hitparade)	5
UK Singles (Official Charts)	2
UK Airplay (Music Week)	20

==== Year-end charts ====
Chart (1992)	Position
Australia (ARIA)	35
Austria (Ö3 Austria Top 40)	9
Belgium (Ultratop)	5
Europe (Eurochart Hot 100)	13
Germany (Media Control)	9
Netherlands (Dutch Top 40)	3
Netherlands (Single Top 100)	1
New Zealand (RIANZ)	20
Sweden (Topplistan)	47
Switzerland (Schweizer Hitparade)	8
UK Singles (OCC)	34

==== Decade-end charts ====
Chart (1990–1999)	Position
Austria (Ö3 Austria Top 40)	26
Netherlands (Dutch Top 40)	44

=== Certifications ===
Region	Certification	Certified units/sales
Australia (ARIA)	Gold	35,000^{^}
Brazil (Pro-Música Brasil)	Platinum	60,000^{‡}
Denmark (IFPI Danmark)	Platinum	90,000^{‡}
Germany (BVMI)	Gold	250,000^{^}
Italy (FIMI)	Platinum	50,000^{‡}
Netherlands (NVPI)	Platinum	75,000^{^}
United Kingdom (BPI)	Platinum	600,000^{‡}
^{^} Shipments figures based on certification alone.^{‡} Sales+streaming figures based on certification alone.

=== Release history ===
Region	Date	Format(s)	Label(s)	Ref.
United Kingdom	May 11, 1992	7-inch vinyl; 12-inch vinyl; CD; cassette	Uzi Suicide; Geffen	
Australia	July 6, 1992	CD; cassette	Uzi Suicide; Geffen	

== Randy Crawford version ==
"Knockin' on Heaven's Door"

Single by Randy Crawford featuring Eric Clapton and David Sanborn

from the album Lethal Weapon 2: Original Motion Picture Soundtrack and Rich and Poor
- B-side: "Medley: The Shipyard/Knockin' on Heaven's Door"
- Released: 1989
- Length: 4:57
- Label: Warner Bros.
- Songwriter: Bob Dylan
- Producer: Michael Powell

Randy Crawford singles chronology
"Higher Than Anyone Can Count" (1987)	"Knockin' on Heaven's Door" (1989)	"Wrap-U-Up" (1990)

American singer Randy Crawford recorded a cover of the song featuring Clapton and alto saxophonist David Sanborn. It was included on the soundtrack to the 1989 buddy cop action comedy film Lethal Weapon 2 and also appeared on Crawford's ninth studio album, Rich and Poor (1989). This version was released as the lead single from Rich and Poor in 1989 and was produced by Michael Powell.

Commercially, Crawford's version peaked at number four on the US Billboard Hot Black Singles chart, reached number two in New Zealand, and entered the top 20 in Belgium and the Netherlands. The song's music video was directed by Gerry Wenner and was produced by John Hopgood.

=== Charts ===
==== Weekly charts ====
Chart (1989)	Peak position
Belgium (Ultratop 50 Flanders)	15
Netherlands (Dutch Top 40)	10
Netherlands (Single Top 100)	12
New Zealand (Recorded Music NZ)	2
UK Singles (Official Charts)	77
US Hot R&B/Hip-Hop Songs (Billboard)	4

=== Year-end charts ===
Chart (1989)	Position
Netherlands (Dutch Top 40)	95

== Dunblane tribute ==
"Knockin' on Heaven's Door"

Single by Dunblane
- A-side: "Throw These Guns Away"
- Released: December 9, 1996
- Recorded: 1996
- Studio: Abbey Road (London, UK)
- Length: 4:09
- Label: RCA; BMG
- Songwriters: Bob Dylan; Ted Christopher
- Producer: Peter Cobbin

In 1996 and with the consent of Dylan, Scottish musician Ted Christopher wrote a new verse for "Knockin' on Heaven's Door" in memory of the schoolchildren and teacher killed in the Dunblane school massacre. This has been, according to some sources, one of the few times Dylan has officially authorized anybody to add or change the lyrics to one of his songs.

This version of the song, featuring children from the village singing the chorus with the guitarist and producer of Dylan's album Infidels (1983), Mark Knopfler, was released on December 9, 1996, in the United Kingdom and reached No. 1 on the UK and Scottish Singles Charts, as well as No. 6 in Iceland and Ireland. The proceeds went to charities for children. The song appeared on the compilation album Hits 97, where all royalties from the song were given to three charities.

=== Charts ===
==== Weekly charts ====
Chart (1996–1997)	Peak position
Iceland (Íslenski Listinn Topp 40)	6
Ireland (IRMA)	6
Scottish Singles Sales (Official Charts)	1
UK Singles (Official Charts)	1

==== Year-end charts ====
Chart (1996)	Position
UK Singles (OCC)	31

Chart (1997)	Position
Iceland (Íslenski Listinn Topp 40)	97

=== Certifications ===
Region	Certification	Certified units/sales
United Kingdom (BPI)	Platinum	600,000^{^}
^{^} Shipments figures based on certification alone.

== Sampled version ==
Gabrielle's single "Rise" (2000) sampled from this song. Dylan liked "Rise" so much that he allowed Gabrielle to use the sample for free, while receiving a co-writer credit for providing the song's chord progression and vocal sample.
