= Abstract Emotions =

Studio album by Randy Crawford
- Released: 1986
- Genre: R&B; pop
- Label: Warner Bros.
- Producer: Reggie Lucas; Hawk Wolinski; James Newton Howard

Randy Crawford chronology
| Nightline (1983) | Abstract Emotions (1986) | Rich and Poor (1989) |

Abstract Emotions is the eighth studio album by American jazz and R&B singer Randy Crawford, released in 1986 by Warner Bros. Records. The album reached No. 14 on the UK Albums Chart and was certified Silver in the UK by the BPI.

== Critical reception ==
Professional ratings
Review scores
| Source | Rating |
|---|---|
| AllMusic | 3.5/5 stars |
| The Philadelphia Inquirer | 3/4 stars |

Lennox Samuels of The Dallas Morning News called Abstract Emotions "a solid, sensual album of R&B-pop material ... the mostly mid- to up-tempo tunes give the LP an upbeat tone, though Crawford also does well with slower songs." Ken Tucker of The Philadelphia Inquirer praised the album, saying that "Crawford sings a series of tart pop songs about love gone wrong that neatly avoids self-pity or facile despair."

Ron Wynn of AllMusic noted that "Randy Crawford continued her run of good '80s albums ... with this 1986 release".

== Track listing ==
Side one

1. "Can't Stand the Pain" (Dean Gant, Mark Winkler) – 6:02
2. "Actual Emotional Love" (Billie Hughes, Roxanne Seeman) – 5:05
3. "World of Fools" (Rolf Graf, Alix Zandrs) – 5:00
4. "Betcha" (Reggie Lucas, Leslie L. Smith) – 4:31
5. "Higher Than Anyone Can Count" (Mary Unobsky, Daniel Ironstone) – 4:14

Side two

1. "Desire" (Lucas) – 5:25
2. "Getting' Away with Murder" (Sue Shifrin, Terry Britten) – 4:02
3. "Overnight" (Lucas) – 5:14
4. "Almaz" (Randy Crawford) – 4:04
5. "Don't Wanna Be Normal" (Patrick Leonard, Hawk Wolinski, James Newton Howard, David Pack, Michael McDonald) – 5:20

== Personnel ==
Musicians

- Randy Crawford – vocals
- "Sir" Dean Gant – keyboards (1–9), synthesizers (1–9), synthesizer programming (1–9)
- Ed Walsh – keyboards (1–9), synthesizers (1–9), synthesizer programming (1–9)
- Harry Whitaker – keyboards (1–9), synthesizers (1–9)
- Fred Zarr – keyboards (1–9), synthesizers (1–9)
- Reggie Lucas – Synclavier II programming (1–9), Octave-Plateau sequencer programming (1–9), guitars (1–9)
- James Newton Howard – keyboards (10), keyboard programming (10)
- Hawk Wolinski – keyboards (10), keyboard programming (10)
- Patrick Leonard – additional synthesizers (10)
- Paul Jackson Jr. – guitars (10)
- Anthony Jackson – electric bass guitar (1–9)
- Bashiri Johnson – percussion ( 1–9)
- Leslie Ming – percussion (1–9)
- Lisa Fischer – backing vocals (1–9)
- Curtis King – backing vocals (1–9)
- Yvonne Lewis – backing vocals (1–9)
- Brenda Wright King – backing vocals (1–9)
- Norma Jean Wright – backing vocals (1–9)

Technical

- Reggie Lucas – producer (1–9), arrangements (1–9)
- James Newton Howard – producer (10)
- Hawk Wolinski – producer (10)
- Joe Ferla – engineer (1–9)
- Ray Blair – engineer (10)
- Peter Doell – mixing (10)
- Jim Dougherty – additional engineer (1–9)
- Jay Mark – additional engineer (1–9)
- Alan Silverman – additional engineer (1–9)
- Jeff Cox – assistant engineer (1–9)
- Craig Johnson – assistant engineer (1–9)
- Glenn Rosenstein – assistant engineer (1–9)
- Jimmy Santis – assistant engineer (1–9)
- Pietro Alifani – art direction, design
- Aaron Rapoport – photography
- Wendy Osmonden – make-up
- Recorded and mixed at Quantum Sound Studios (Jersey City, New Jersey)
- Additional recording at Giant Sound Studios and Sigma Sound Studios, (New York City, New York)
- Mastered at Direct Digital Mastering

== Charts ==
| Chart (1986) | Peak position |
|---|---|
| Australian Albums (ARIA) | 74 |
| Dutch Albums (Album Top 100) | 52 |
| Norwegian Albums (VG-lista) | 10 |
| UK Albums (OCC) | 14 |
| US Billboard 200 | 178 |
| US Top R&B/Hip-Hop Albums (Billboard) | 53 |
