= Rainy Night in Georgia =

1969 single by Brook Benton

Single by Brook Benton

from the album Brook Benton Today
- B-side: "Where Do I Go From Here?"
- Released: December 1969
- Recorded: 1969
- Studio: Criteria (Miami)
- Genre: R&B, soul
- Length: 3:29
- Label: Cotillion/Atlantic
- Songwriter: Tony Joe White
- Producer: Arif Mardin

Brook Benton singles chronology
"Nothing Can Take the Place of You" (1969)	"Rainy Night in Georgia" (1969)	"My Way" (1970)

"Rainy Night in Georgia"

Single by Randy Crawford

from the album Secret Combination
- B-side: "I Got Myself A Happy Song"
- Released: 1981
- Genre: R&B
- Length: 4:22
- Label: Warner Bros. Records
- Songwriter: Tony Joe White
- Producer: Tommy LiPuma

Randy Crawford singles chronology
"You Might Need Somebody" (1981)	"Rainy Night in Georgia" (1981)	"Secret Combination" (1981)

"Rainy Night in Georgia" is a song written by Tony Joe White in 1967 and popularized by R&B vocalist Brook Benton in 1970. It was originally released by White on his 1969 album, Continued, on Monument Records, shortly before Benton's hit single was issued.

== Song writing ==
In a January 17, 2014, interview with music journalist Ray Shasho, Tony Joe White explained the thought process behind the making of "Rainy Night in Georgia" and "Polk Salad Annie".

When I got out of high school I went to Marietta, Georgia, I had a sister living there. I went down there to get a job and I was playing guitar too at the house and stuff. I drove a dump truck for the highway department and when it would rain you didn't have to go to work. You could stay home and play your guitar and hangout all night. So those thoughts came back to me when I moved on to Texas about three months later. I heard "Ode to Billie Joe" on the radio and I thought, man, how real, because I am Billie Joe, I know that life. I've been in the cotton fields. So I thought if I ever tried to write, I'm going to write about something I know about. At that time I was doing a lot of Elvis and John Lee Hooker onstage with my drummer. No original songs and I hadn't really thought about it. But after I heard Bobbie Gentry I sat down and thought ... well I know about poke [salad] because I had ate a bunch of it and I knew about rainy nights because I spent a lot of rainy nights in Marietta, Georgia. So I was real lucky with my first tries to write something that was not only real and hit pretty close to the bone, but lasted that long. So it was kind of a guide for me then on through life to always try to write what I know about.

== Brook Benton version ==
In 1969, after several years without a major hit, Benton had signed to a new record label, Cotillion Records (a subsidiary of Atlantic Records), by label A&R chief and producer Jerry Wexler. Benton recorded the song in November 1969 with arranger/producer Arif Mardin at Criteria Studios in Miami, Florida. Session personnel on the record included Billy Carter on organ, Dave Crawford on piano, Cornell Dupree and Jimmy O'Rourke on guitar, Harold Cowart on bass, Tubby Ziegler on drums, and Toots Thielemans on harmonica.

Included on his "comeback" album Brook Benton Today, the melancholy song became an instant hit. In the spring of 1970, the song had topped the Billboard Best Selling Soul Singles chart. It also reached number four on the Billboard Hot 100, and number two on the Adult Contemporary chart. In Canada, the song made #2 on the RPM Magazine Hot Singles chart, #2 for three weeks on the AC Chart, and #58 in the 1970 Year End Chart.

The RIAA certified the single gold for sales of one million copies. In 2004, it was ranked #498 on the List of Rolling Stone's 500 Greatest Songs of All Time.

== Randy Crawford version ==
Randy Crawford's version from the album Secret Combination reached No. 18 in the UK Singles Chart in 1981.
