= Randy Crawford =

American jazz and R&B singer (born 1952)

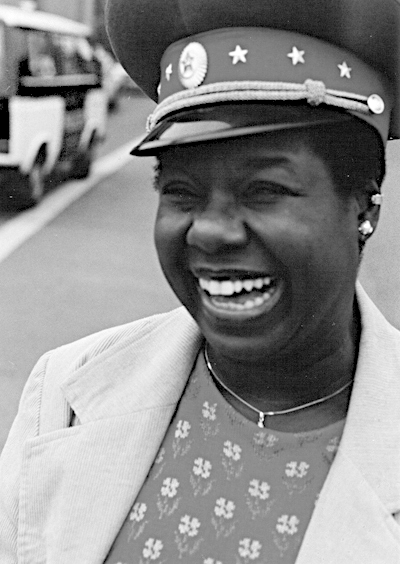
- Crawford in 2008

Background information
- Born: Veronica Crawford; February 18, 1952 (age 74); Macon, Georgia, U.S.
- Genres: Jazz, R&B, disco, smooth jazz
- Occupation: Singer
- Years active: 1975–2018
- Labels: Columbia, Warner Bros., MCA, WEA, PRA

Veronica "Randy" Crawford (born February 18, 1952) is an American retired jazz and R&B singer. She has been more successful in Europe than in the United States, where she has not entered the Billboard Hot 100 as a solo artist. However, she has appeared on the Hot 100 singles chart twice. The first time was in 1979 as a guest vocalist on the Crusaders' top-40 hit "Street Life". She also dueted with Rick Springfield on the song "Taxi Dancing", which hit number 59 as the B-side of Springfield's hit "Bop Til You Drop". She has had five top-20 hits in the UK, including her 1980 number-two hit, "One Day I'll Fly Away", as well as six UK top-10 albums. Despite her American nationality, she won Best British Female Solo Artist in recognition of her popularity in the UK at the 1982 Brit Awards. In the late 2000s, she received her first two Grammy Award nominations.

== Career ==
Crawford first performed at club gigs from Cincinnati to Saint-Tropez, but made her name in the mid-1970s in New York, where she sang with jazzmen George Benson and Cannonball Adderley. She signed with Columbia Records and released her first single, "Knock On Wood" / "If You Say the Word" in 1972. Adderley invited her to sing on his album Big Man: The Legend Of John Henry (1975). During a brief tenure at Columbia Records, Crawford recorded "Don't Get Caught in Love's Triangle". She is also one of the vocalists on Fred Wesley & The Horny Horns' A Blow For Me, A Toot To You (1977).

In 1978, Crawford sang vocals on "Hoping Love Will Last", the opening song on side two of Please Don't Touch!, which was the second solo album by the former Genesis guitarist Steve Hackett.

She led R&B veterans The Crusaders on the transatlantic hit "Street Life" (1979). A specially re-recorded version was featured in the soundtrack for the films Sharky's Machine and Jackie Brown, and appeared in commercials in the early 2000s. She later recorded for Warner Bros. Records. Crawford was named the 'Most Outstanding Performer' at the 1980 Tokyo Music Festival. Crawford also recorded the love theme ("People Alone") for the film soundtrack of The Competition on MCA Records in 1980.

Her follow-up solo efforts included "One Day I'll Fly Away" (1980) and "You Might Need Somebody" (1981), which became soul standards, and a cover of the Tony Joe White song, popularised by Brook Benton, "Rainy Night in Georgia". The album Secret Combination (1981) stayed on the UK Albums Chart for sixty weeks, after which her profile dipped, despite a return to the UK Top Ten with "Almaz" in 1986. In June 1981, Crawford also released another hit, "One Hello", from the album Windsong. She continued to record for Warner Bros through the 1990s, but was unable to score either a big R&B hit or major crossover success.

Naked And True (1995) brought Crawford back to her roots: it included George Benson's "Give Me the Night", and confirmed her soul heritage by featuring Funkadelic members Bootsy Collins, Bernie Worrell and the Fred Wesley Horns. She enjoyed her highest profile of the decade when rising starlet Shola Ama had a worldwide hit with her 1997 cover of "You Might Need Somebody".

Crawford recorded a live session with Joe Sample on July 24, 2007, at Abbey Road Studios for Live from Abbey Road. The episode she shared with David Gilmour and Amos Lee was screened on the Sundance Channel in the US and Channel 4 in the UK.

She has sung with Bootsy Collins, Johnny Bristol, Quincy Jones, Al Jarreau, Rick Springfield, Katri Helena, Michael Kamen, Zucchero, David Sanborn, Steve Hackett, the Spanish band Presuntos Implicados, the Norwegian jazz-rock band Lava and Joe Sample amongst others.

Randy Crawford was set to perform "The Farewell South Africa" tour in Cape Town and Pretoria in October 2018 but it was cancelled due to her suffering a stroke. This would have been Crawford's final performance prior to retiring.

== Discography ==
- Everything Must Change (1976)
- Miss Randy Crawford (1977)
- Raw Silk (1979)
- Now We May Begin (1980)
- Secret Combination (1981)
- Windsong (1982)
- Nightline (1983)
- Abstract Emotions (1986)
- Rich and Poor (1989)
- Through the Eyes of Love (1992)
- Don't Say It's Over (1993)
- Naked and True (1995)
- Every Kind of Mood — Randy, Randi, Randee (1997)
- Permanent/Play Mode (2001)
- Feeling Good (2006)
- No Regrets (2008)

== Collaboration ==
- 1978: Please Don't Touch! by Steve Hackett – Lead vocals on "Hoping Love Will Last".
- 2017: Time and the River by David Sanborn – Lead vocals on “Windmills of my Mind”.

== Awards ==
=== Grammy Awards ===
Year	Nominee / work	Award	Result
2007	"All Night Long" (with Joe Sample)	Best Traditional R&B Vocal Performance	Nominated
2009	No Regrets (with Joe Sample)	Best Jazz Vocal Album	Nominated

=== Brit Awards ===
Year	Nominee / work	Award	Result
1982	Randy Crawford	Best British Female Solo Artist	Won
