= Roland Bautista =

American guitarist (1951–2012)

- Born: May 30, 1951
- Died: February 29, 2012 (aged 60)
- Genres: Jazz, R&B, soul, pop, rock, blues
- Occupation: Guitarist
- Years active: 1972–2012
- Formerly of: Earth, Wind & Fire, The Crusaders, Ronnie Laws, George Duke, Ramsey Lewis, Tom Waits, Randy Crawford

Roland Bautista (May 30, 1951 – February 29, 2012) was an American guitarist. He was best known for his work with Earth, Wind & Fire. He also worked with such artists as Ronnie Laws, The Crusaders, George Duke and Randy Crawford.

== Career ==
=== Earth, Wind and Fire ===
Bautista first played as a rhythm guitarist on Earth, Wind & Fire's 1972 album Last Days and Time. He left the band soon after the album's release, but returned in 1981 to replace departed guitarist Al McKay. Bautista played on the Earth, Wind & Fire albums Raise!, Powerlight and Electric Universe from 1981 to 1983. The band then took a four-year hiatus, and Bautista did not return when they reformed in 1987.

=== Work with other artists ===
During 1967, Roland Bautista joined the Velvet Illusions, a teen band originally from Yakima, Washington, based in Hollywood, California. He played rhythm guitar with the Velvet Illusions at live shows and upon a tune, recorded at Sunset Sound, called "Lazy". The band broke up in early fall of 1967. But nearly fifty years later, in 2019, their material was reissued on CD and vinyl.

Bautista later played rhythm guitar on Ronnie Laws's 1975 debut LP Pressure Sensitive, Leon Haywood's 1975 album Come and Get Yourself Some and The Crusaders 1976 LP Free as the Wind. Bautista then issued two solo albums being 1977's Bautista and 1978's The Heat of the Wind on ABC Records. He also played on Ronnie Laws 1977 album Friends & Strangers. Friends & Strangers has been certified Gold in the US by the RIAA. Bautista then performed upon B.B. King's 1978 album Midnight Believer and Tom Waits' 1978 release Blue Valentine. He also featured on The Crusaders' 1978 Grammy nominated album Images, George Duke's 1978 LP Don't Let Go and The Jacksons 1978 album Destiny. Destiny has been certified Platinum in the US by the RIAA. Bautista later played upon Hubert Laws' 1978 album Land of Passion, The Emotions 1979 album Come into Our World, George Duke's 1979 LP Follow the Rainbow, Dee Dee Bridgewater's 1979 album Bad for Me and The Crusaders' 1979 LP Street Life. Street Life has been certified Gold in the US by the RIAA.

Bautista once again played with Tom Waits on his 1980 album Heartattack and Vine, The Crusaders on their 1980 album Rhapsody and Blues and performed on Randy Crawford's 1980 album Now We May Begin, which has been certified Silver in the UK by the BPI. Bautista then made guest appearances on Ramsey Lewis's 1980 LP Routes, The Dramatics 1980 album 10½ and George Duke's 1980 LP A Brazilian Love Affair. He also featured on Stanley Turrentine's 1981 album Tender Togetherness, the Yellowjackets 1981 self titled debut LP and Ella Fitzgerald's 1981 album Ella Abraça Jobim.

Bautista went on to play rhythm guitar on Ronnie Laws' 1983 album Mr. Nice Guy, Phillip Bailey's 1983 LP Continuation, Jennifer Holliday's Grammy nominated 1983 album Feel My Soul. He also appeared on Laws' 1984 album Classic Masters, The Crusaders' 1984 Grammy nominated LP Ghetto Blaster and Morris Day's 1985 album Color of Success. Color of Success has been certified Gold in the US by the RIAA. He again collaborated with Ramsey Lewis on his 1987 album Keys to the City. On that album his former EWF bandmates Maurice White, Larry Dunn and Don Myrick also made guest appearances. Bautista later guested on Ronnie Laws' 1989 album True Spirit and The Crusaders 1993 album Live in Japan.

== Death ==
Bautista died on February 29, 2012, at the age of 60.

== Legacy ==
Artists such as Brandon Williams and William DuVall of Alice in Chains have been influenced by Bautista.

== Selective discography ==
- 1972 Last Days and Time – Earth, Wind & Fire
- 1975 Pressure Sensitive – Ronnie Laws
- 1975 Come and Get Yourself Some – Leon Haywood
- 1976 Free as the Wind – The Crusaders
- 1977 Bautista – Roland Bautista
- 1977 Friends & Strangers – Ronnie Laws
- 1977 Genie – Bobby Lyle
- 1977 New Warrior – Bobby Lyle
- 1977 Peddlin' Music on the Side – Lamont Dozier
- 1978 Blue Valentine – Tom Waits
- 1978 Destiny – The Jacksons
- 1978 Flame – Ronnie Laws
- 1978 Don't Let Go – George Duke
- 1978 Images – The Crusaders
- 1978 Heat of the Wind – Roland Bautista
- 1978 Midnight Believer – B.B. King
- 1979 Street Life – The Crusaders
- 1979 Master of the Game – George Duke
- 1979 Land of Passion - Hubert Laws
- 1979 Bad for Me - Dee Dee Bridgewater
- 1979 Follow the Rainbow - George Duke
- 1980 Seawind – Seawind
- 1980 A Brazilian Love Affair – George Duke
- 1980 Heartattack and Vine – Tom Waits
- 1980 10½ – The Dramatics
- 1980 Now We May Begin – Randy Crawford
- 1980 Rhapsody and Blues – The Crusaders
- 1980 Routes – Ramsey Lewis
- 1980 Tender Togetherness – Stanley Turrentine
- 1981 Electric Collection – Ramsey Lewis
- 1981 Solid Ground – Ronnie Laws
- 1981 Raise! – Earth, Wind & Fire
- 1983 Powerlight – Earth, Wind & Fire
- 1983 Mr. Nice Guy – Ronnie Laws
- 1983 Continuation – Phillip Bailey
- 1983 Feel My Soul – Jennifer Holliday
- 1983 Electric Universe – Earth, Wind & Fire
- 1984 Classic Masters – Ronnie Laws
- 1984 Jukebox – Dazz Band
- 1984 Ghetto Blaster – The Crusaders
- 1985 Color of Success – Morris Day
- 1987 Keys to the City – Ramsey Lewis
- 1989 True Spirit – Ronnie Laws
- 1993 Live in Japan – The Crusaders
