= Larry Dunn =

American musician (born 1953)

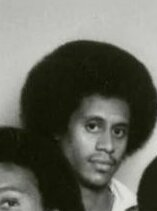
- Dunn with Earth, Wind & Fire c. 1977

Background information
- Born: Lorenzo Russell Dunn; June 19, 1953 (age 73)
- Origin: Denver, Colorado, U.S.
- Genres: Funk; disco; soul
- Occupations: Musician; producer; songwriter
- Years active: 1972–present
- Labels: Columbia; ARC; Another Hit; 101 South
- Formerly of: Earth, Wind & Fire
- Website: larrydunnmusic.com

Larry Dunn (born Lorenzo Russell Dunn; June 19, 1953) is an American keyboardist, producer, songwriter and musical director, known as one of the original members of the music group Earth, Wind & Fire. Dunn was inducted, as a former band member, into the Rock & Roll Hall of Fame, the Songwriters Hall of Fame and the Colorado Music Hall of Fame. Dunn has received the ASCAP Rhythm & Soul Heritage Award, 7 Grammy Awards, 4 American Music Awards and a Grammy Lifetime Achievement Award. Dunn is a co-composer of EWF's "Shining Star", a song that's been inducted into the Grammy Hall of Fame.

As a record producer, Dunn is best known for his work with Lenny White, Caldera, Ramsey Lewis, Level 42, Twennynine, Ronnie Laws, Raphael Saadiq, The Emotions, Dee Dee Bridgewater and Brian Culbertson.

== Early life, family and education ==
Born as Lorenzo Dunn to an Italian mother and African American father, he early on became fond of music and later attended East High School in Denver, Colorado.

== Career ==
=== Teenage years ===
By age 13, he was performing in local bands, and at age 15, he began playing regularly at a nightclub owned by Denver Rockets basketball player Wayne Hightower. Despite being underage, Dunn and his bandmates, including future collaborators such as Philip Bailey, were allowed to perform seven nights a week, covering music by James Brown, Dionne Warwick, Santana, and The Temptations among others.

At age 16, Dunn co-founded Friends & Lovers, a band that included Bailey and Andrew Woolfolk, among others. The group opened for an early lineup of Earth, Wind & Fire. After Earth, Wind & Fire's original members left, Bailey contacted Maurice White to recommend Dunn, following a performance where Dunn played an extended Hammond B3 organ solo during a show at Manual High School in Denver. This ultimately led to Dunn joining Earth, Wind & Fire, becoming one of its original members of its classic lineup.

=== Earth, Wind & Fire ===
During 1972, while in Los Angeles, Dunn joined a new band led and founded by a Chicago musician known as Maurice White by the name of Earth, Wind & Fire. As a keyboardist Dunn played with the legendary band for the next 11 years until his departure in 1983.

Dunn went on to make a guest appearance on EWF's 2013 album Now, Then & Forever.

=== Production ===
Dunn produced Caldera on their 1977 album Sky Islands. Sky Islands rose to No. 18 on the Cashbox Top Jazz Albums chart. He then co-produced Ramsey Lewis' 1977 studio LP Tequila Mockingbird. Tequila Mockingbird peaked at No. 6 on the Billboard Top Jazz Albums chart. He again produced Caldera on the group's 1978 album Time and Chance. Dunn later produced Lenny White on his 1978 album Streamline. Streamline reached No. 27 on the Billboard Top Jazz Albums chart.

Along with White he co-produced Twennynine's 1979 LP Best of Friends. That album reached number 15 on the Billboard Top R&B Albums chart. Together with Lenny White he again co-produced the group's 1980 album entitled Twennynine with Lenny White. That LP reached No. 22 on the Billboard Top R&B Albums chart. Dunn went on to produce Ramsey Lewis on his 1980 album Routes. Routes reached No. 7 on the Billboard Top Jazz Albums chart. He later produced Stanley Turrentine's 1981 LP Tender Togetherness. That album got to No. 13 on the Billboard Jazz Albums chart. He then co-produced, along with EWF's Verdine White, Level 42's 1983 album Standing in the Light. Standing in the Light was certified Gold in the UK by the BPI.

=== Guest appearances ===
Dunn performed as a keyboardist on The Emotions' 1976 album Flowers, Deniece Williams' 1977 album Song Bird, Dee Dee Bridgewater's 1977 LP Just Family and Ronnie Laws' 1977 album Friends & Strangers. He also performed on the Emotions' 1977 album Rejoice, the Pockets's 1978 LP Take It On Up, Caldera's 1978 album Time and Chance, and Lenny White's 1978 album The Adventures of Astral Pirates. Dunn went on to play the keyboards on Ronnie Laws 1978 LP Flame, Hubert Laws' 1979 LP Land of Passion and Dee Dee Bridgewater's 1979 album Bad for Me. He then played on Ronnie Laws' 1980 LP Every Generation and his 1981 album Solid Ground. Dunn then performed on Ronnie Laws' 1983 album Mr. Nice Guy and Jennifer Holliday's 1983 LP Feel My Soul.

Dunn later featured on Morris Day's 1985 album Color of Success and Ronnie Laws 1986 LP Mirror Town. He then appeared on Ramsey Lewis 1987 album Keys to the City and Ronnie Laws' 1989 LP True Spirit. Dunn later composed on Ronnie Laws' 1991 album Identity and his 1992 LP Deep Soul. Dunn also worked as an arranger on Laws' 1995 album Brotherhood. He then played on Dean James 1997 LP Intimacy and Reel Tight's 1999 album Back to the Real. Dunn also appeared on Ronnie Laws' 2000 LP Dream a Little and his 2004 album Everlasting. Dunn later performed on Brian Culbertson's 2008 album Bringing Back The Funk, Raphael Saadiq's 2010 LP Stone Rollin' and Culbertson's 2014 album Another Long Night Out.

== Discography ==
Year	CD	Label	Additional info
1992	Larry Dunn Orchestra : Lover's Silhouette	Another Hit Records	Original, US release
1996	Larry Dunn Orchestra : Lover's Silhouette	101 South ( fusion label )	European release

== Awards and honors ==
=== Grammy Awards ===
Year	Nominee / work	Award	Result
1976	Shining Star	Best R&B Vocal Performance By A Duo, Group Or Chorus	Won
1977	Gratitude	Best R&B Vocal Performance By A Duo, Group Or Chorus	Nominated
1977	Can't Hide Love	Best Arrangement For Voices	Nominated
1979	All 'N All	Best R&B Vocal Performance By A Duo, Group Or Chorus	Won
1979	Runnin	Best R&B Instrumental Performance	Won
1979	Got To Get You Into My Life	Best Pop Vocal Group	Nominated
1980	After The Love Has Gone	Best R&B Vocal Performance By A Duo, Group Or Chorus	Won
1980	Boogie Wonderland	Best R&B Instrumental Performance	Won
1980	Boogie Wonderland	Best Disco Recording	Nominated
1980	After The Love Has Gone	Record Of The Year	Nominated
1982	Let’s Groove	Best R&B Vocal Performance By A Duo Or Group	Nominated
1983	Wanna Be With You	Best R&B Vocal Performance By A Duo Or Group	Won
1984	Fall In Love With Me	Best R&B Vocal Performance By A Duo Or Group	Nominated
