= Fever (Ronnie Laws album) =

Studio album by Ronnie Laws
- Released: 1976; 1992 (re-release)
- Recorded: December 26 & 29, 1975, January 16, 1976 and February–March, 1976
- Studio: Total Experience Recording Studios (Hollywood, California)
- Genre: Jazz
- Length: 41:02
- Label: Blue Note
- Producer: George Butler

Ronnie Laws chronology
Pressure Sensitive (1975)	Fever (1976)	Friends & Strangers (1977)

Fever is the second album by American saxophonist Ronnie Laws released in 1976 by Blue Note Records. The album reached No. 13 on the Billboard Top Soul LPs chart.

== Reception ==
Professional ratings
Review scores
Source	Rating
AllMusic	4/5 stars
The Rolling Stone Jazz Record Guide	2/5 stars
The Penguin Guide to Jazz Recordings	2.5/4 stars

The AllMusic review by Alex Henderson states, "Because Laws has recorded so many throwaways, one has to approach his catalog with caution; but rest assured that Fever puts his talent to work instead of wasting it".

== Track listing ==
All compositions by Ronnie Laws except as indicated

1. "Let's Keep It Together" – 4:30
2. "Fever" (Eddie Cooley, John Davenport) – 3:24
3. "All the Time" (William Jeffery) – 4:00
4. "Stay Still (And Let Me Love You)" (Margie Joseph, Arif Mardin) – 7:24
5. "Strugglin'" (W. Murray) – 4:08
6. "Captain Midnite" – 2:58
7. "Karmen" – 3:47
8. "Night Breeze" (Bobby Lyle) – 6:29
9. "From Ronnie with Love" – 4:22

Recorded at Total Experience Studios in Los Angeles, California between December 1975 and March 1976.

== Personnel ==
- Ronnie Laws – tenor saxophone, soprano saxophone, flute
- Donald Hepburn, Michael Hepburn, Bobby Lyle – electric piano, clavinet, synthesizer
- Marlin the Magician – guitar
- Wilton Felder, Nathaniel Phillips – electric bass
- Bruce Carter, Steve Guttierez – drums
- Bruce Smith – percussion
- Tony Ben – conga
- Murray Adler, Bonnie Douglas, Henry Ferber, Elliott Fisher, Ronald Folsom, James Getzoff, William Kurash, Joy Lyle, Gordon Marron, Paul C. Shure, Felix Sitjar, Carroll Stephens – violin
- Jesse Ehrlich, Nathan Gershman, Raymond J. Kelley, Victor Sazer – vocals
- Ronald Coleman, Augie Johnson, Esau Joyner, Michael Miller, Deborah Shotlow, Douglas Thomas – backing vocals
