= Prelude, Op. 28, No. 4 (Chopin) =

Piano composition by Frédéric Chopin

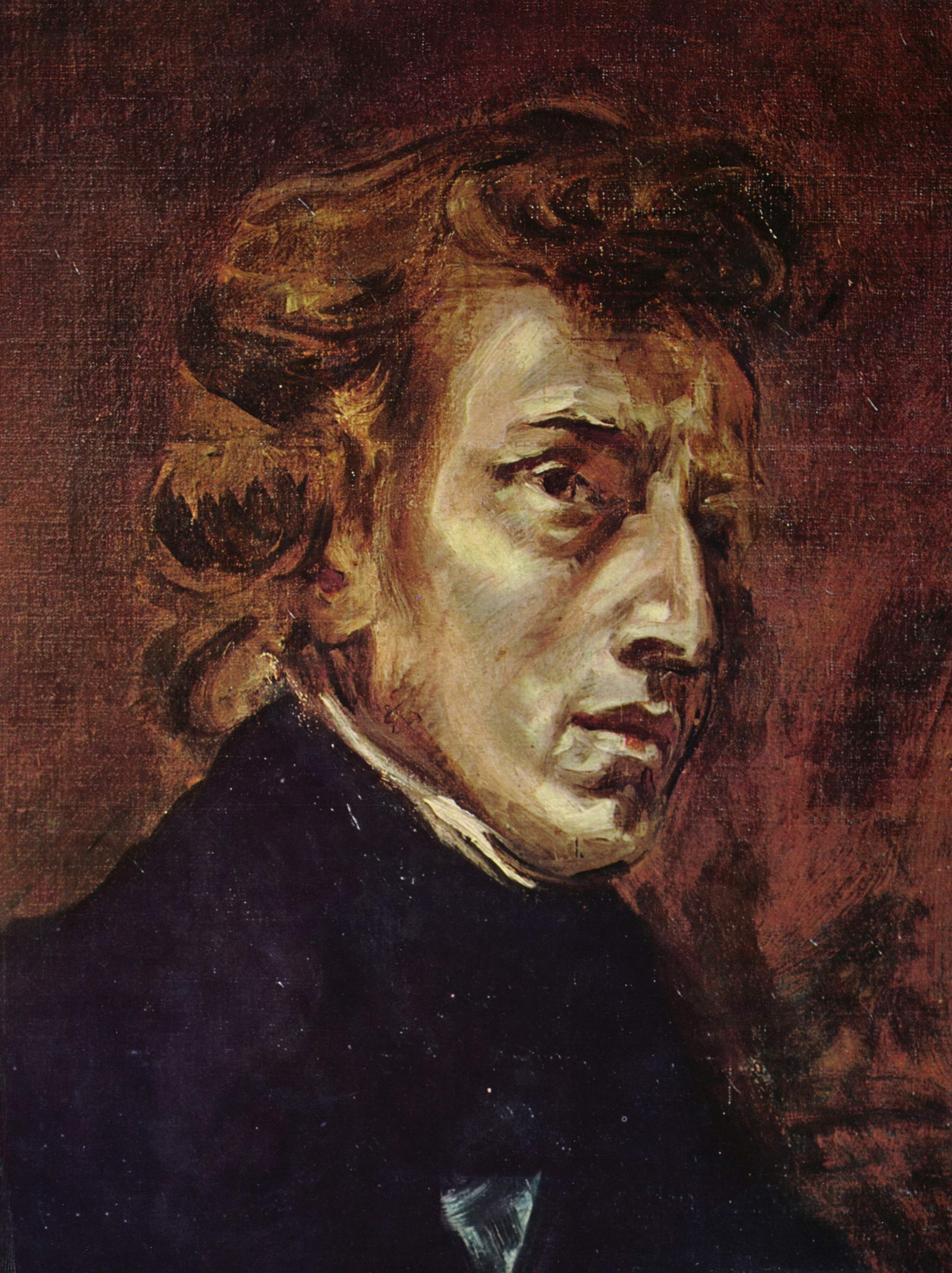
Frédéric Chopin, 28, at piano, from Delacroix's joint portrait of Chopin and Sand, 1838

Prelude Op. 28, No. 4 in E minor
Porticodoro / SmartCGArt Media Productions - Steinway Piano

The Prelude Op. 28, No. 4 by Frédéric Chopin is one of the 24 Chopin preludes. Only one page long, this prelude is one of Chopin's simplest and most famous preludes. At Chopin's request, this piece was played at his funeral, along with Prelude No. 6 in B minor and Mozart's Requiem.

== Name ==
Hans von Bülow called the prelude "suffocation", due to its sense of despair. In fact, Chopin's last dynamic marking in the piece is smorzando, which means "dying away". But the prelude may have once been given a title. According to George Sand's daughter Solange, who stayed with the composer at the monastery in Mallorca when the preludes were written, "My mother gave a title to each of Chopin's wonderful Preludes; these titles have been preserved on a score he gave to us." That titled score is lost. But Solange did record the names of the preludes, apparently without assigning the names to the prelude numbers. It is believed that the title "Quelles larmes au fond du cloître humide?" ("What tears [are shed] from the depths of the damp monastery?") corresponds to Prelude No. 4.

== Music ==
The main motif of the music follows a chromatic descent in both the melody and accompanying chords. The treble line (resembling a "pedal point", unusually in the upper voice), begins on the dominant B and works its way down chromatically to the tonic E throughout the entire piece, excluding measures 9 and 12, the latter of which signals the interruption of the descending line and the melody starts over again. The 8th note ostinato in the bass begins on an inverted E minor chord and continuously descends chromatically with the treble.

At measure 16 during the repeat, a climax suddenly errupts in fortissimo, briefly deviating from the melodic descent, and then ends by returning to the slow, chromatic motif, which successfully makes its way down to the tonic, before abruptly ending on a German augmented sixth in measure 23. The piece then closes on a perfect cadence in E minor.

== Cultural legacy ==
=== Film and television ===
- Anne Archer's character, Beth Gallagher, plays a portion of the prelude in the 1987 film Fatal Attraction
- Jack Nicholson's character plays the prelude in its entirety in the 1970 film Five Easy Pieces.
- This piece is featured in The West Wing episode "Han" and is used as the embodiment of Han, for which "There is no literal English translation. It's a state of mind. Of soul, really. A sadness. A sadness so deep no tears will come. And yet still there's hope."
- The 2002 film The Pianist has this composition on its soundtrack.
- It is included on the soundtrack to the 2004 film The Notebook.
- The piece is featured in the 1961 British thriller Taste of Fear (US title: Scream of Fear).
- It is used in the soundtrack to the motion picture, Death Wish II (1982), although the composition is credited to Jimmy Page.
- Halfway through the 1931 film Street Scene, the prelude is faintly played in one of the apartments, as a piano–violin duet.
- This piece is played in the opening scene of the second season of The 100, when Clarke is being held in quarantine in Mount Weather.
- An uncredited string adaptation of this piece is featured in the soundtrack to the film A Tale of Two Cities, serving as the condemned seamstress's theme.
- Meryl Streep's and Simon Helberg's characters play this piece together in a poignant moment in the 2016 film Florence Foster Jenkins.
- In season 3 episode 3 of The Flash this song can be heard in the background of a scene in a restaurant.
- The 1945 British film A Place of One's Own features the piece when the ghost first possesses Annette (portrayed by Margaret Lockwood).
- This piece is mentioned in the book Fifty Shades of Gray and is also featured in the film adaptation.
- A jazz combo plays the piece with an additional interlude in the 1938 Austrian film The Jumping Jack by Karlheinz Martin in a nightclub scene featuring Hilde Krahl and Frits van Dongen
- Alexej (Hannes Stelzer) plays the piece after everyone except him and the general has left the birthday party for the old lady in The Gambler (1938)
- Austrian filmmaker Ulrich Seidl uses a tango version of the prelude for a striptease scene and during the end titles of his 2001 film Dog Days.
- The piece is played in the Star Trek: The Next Generation episode "The Masterpiece Society".
- Admiral Janeway listens to the piece in the episode Preludes of Star Trek: Prodigy
- Sarah Miles plays the piece after her family home has been damaged by a German WWII bomb on a dust-covered but, evidently, still functional upright piano, in John Boorman's 1987 film Hope and Glory.
- The piece is used in the 2011 film Margin Call.
- This prelude is played during the final scene of the 2002 Polish film Day of the Wacko.
- The piece is played in S2E3 of the TV Series Hannibal
- It is used in a 2006 avant-garde science fiction film Daft Punk's Electroma
- In "Chapter Forty: The Great Escape", the fifth episode of the TV series Riverdale, the piece can be heard in the background of a scene in a prison
- Variations of this piece appear in the 2023 French film Anatomy of a Fall
- The piece is both the theme, and an essential part of the plot, of The Amazing Mr. X

=== Adaptations and covers ===
- The Gerry Mulligan Sextet recorded a jazz arrangement of the composition, named Prelude in E Minor, which appeared on their 1963 album Night Lights.
- Antonio Carlos Jobim's song "Insensatez" is based on the prelude.
- An ambient chiptune musical arrangement entitled "Continuum" by Rich Vreeland is played during the normal ending of the 2012 video game Fez.
- The French rap band Suprême NTM sampled it, on their self-titled 1998 album, for their song "That's My People".
- Musician Rob Dougan composed and recorded "Clubbed To Death 2", a song which uses the prelude for most of its musical structure.
- Don Byron covered Prelude No. 4 on clarinet in a track named "Charley's Prelude" on his album Bug Music.
- Serge Gainsbourg added lyrics to the prelude, resulting in his 1969 song "Jane B".
- The Radiohead song "Exit Music (For a Film)", which was written for the film Romeo + Juliet, and which featured on the band's album OK Computer, is based on the Prelude No. 4.
- Other musicians, such as Jimmy Page from rock band Led Zeppelin, have also made contemporary arrangements of this piece.
- The soundtrack of the 1999 video game Age of Empires II contains the song "Pork Parts" composed by Stephen Rippy, based on this piece.
- Chick Corea's final album, "Plays", contains a performance.
- Tosca Tango Orchestra's composition "Prelude", which is featured on their 1998 album "La Furia Del Tango", is based heavily on the Prelude No. 4.
- Peter Welsh arranged the Prelude No. 4 for flute and harpsichord in 2012.
- Featured at the end of "Plenilunio" by Una Stagione all'Inferno, the closing track of their 2018 album "Il Mostro di Firenze"
- Ramsey Lewis arranged Prelude No. 4 into "Essence of Love" as found in Les Fleurs (album)

=== Other ===
- Benjamin Zander talks in depth about the prelude in talks (the most notable being his TED2008 appearance) to persuade the public that Classical music is enjoyable by everyone.
