= Identity (Ronnie Laws album) =

Studio album by Ronnie Laws
- Released: 1990
- Genre: Jazz
- Label: ATA

Ronnie Laws chronology
True Spirit (1989)	Identity (1990)	Deep Soul (1992)

Professional ratings
Review scores
Source	Rating
AllMusic	1.5/5 stars

Identity is a studio album by American saxophonist Ronnie Laws, released in 1990 via ATA Records. The album peaked at No. 19 on the US Billboard Top Contemporary Jazz Albums chart.

== Track listing ==
No.	Title	Writer(s)	Length
1.	"Sing Song Sing"	Ronnie Laws, Terry Marshall	4:53
2.	"Morning in My Life"	Ronnie Laws	4:53
3.	"If You Don't Know Me by Now"	Kenny Gamble, Leon Huff	5:25
4.	"Darling Baby"	Ronnie Laws	5:12
5.	"Palisades"	Ronnie Laws	5:00
6.	"Living in a Dumb World"	Ronnie Laws	4:05
7.	"Soul of a Man"	Bobby "Blue" Bland, Alfred Braggs	4:30
8.	"Identity"	Craig T. Cooper, Ronnie Laws	4:55
9.	"Catch 22"	Ronnie Laws, Terry Marshall	5:16
10.	"Sticks & Stones"	Ronnie Laws	5:16
11.	"Street Knowledge"	Larry Dunn, Ronnie Laws	4:54
