= Friends & Strangers =

Studio album by Ronnie Laws
- Released: 1977
- Recorded: January–March 1977
- Studios: ABC, Los Angeles, California
- Genre: Jazz
- Length: 40:50
- Label: Blue Note
- Producer: Wayne Henderson

Ronnie Laws chronology
| Fever (1976) | Friends & Strangers (1977) | Flame (1978) |

Friends & Strangers is the third album by American saxophonist Ronnie Laws, recorded in 1976–1977 and released on the Blue Note label. The album was certified Gold by the RIAA for sales of over 500,000 copies.

== Reception ==
The AllMusic review by Ed Hogan stated that "saxophonist Ronnie Laws' Friends and Strangers LP showcases his skilled chops on up-tempo and mellow tunes".

Professional ratings
Review scores
| Source | Rating |
|---|---|
| AllMusic | 3/5 stars |
| The Rolling Stone Jazz Record Guide | 2/5 stars |

== Track listing ==
All compositions by Ronnie Laws except as indicated

1. "Good Time Ride" (William Jeffrey, Laws) - 5:05
2. "Saturday Evening" - 4:34
3. "Friends and Strangers" (Jeffrey) - 4:49
4. "Nuthin' 'Bout Nuthin'" (Jeffrey, Laws) - 5:11
5. "New Day" - 6:17
6. "Life In Paradise" - 7:01
7. "Same Old Story" - 4:41
8. "Just Love" (Larry Dunn, Laws, Eloise Laws) - 3:25

- Recorded at ABC Recording Studios in Los Angeles, California in January–March 1977.

== Personnel ==
- Ronnie Laws - tenor saxophone, soprano saxophone, alto flute
- Bobby Lyle - piano
- Larry Dunn - synthesizer
- Roland Bautista, Melvin Robinson - guitar
- Donnie Beck, Nathaniel Phillips - electric bass
- Steve Guttierez - drums
- Vance "Mad Dog" Ternort - conga, percussion
- Saundra "Pan" Alexander, Deborah Laws, Eloise Laws - backing vocals
