= Stay Awake (Ronnie Laws song) =

1981 single by Ronnie Laws

Single by Ronnie Laws

from the album Solid Ground
- B-side: "Summer Fool"
- Released: 1981
- Genre: Soul; smooth jazz
- Length: 3:13 (single version); 4:09 (album & 12" version)
- Label: Liberty Records
- Songwriter(s): Ronnie Laws
- Producer(s): Ronnie Laws

Ronnie Laws singles chronology
"Every Generation" (1980)	"Stay Awake" (1981)	"There's A Way" (1981)

"Stay Awake" is a song by Ronnie Laws. It was released in 1981 as a single from his album Solid Ground.

The song is Laws' only Billboard Hot 100 entry, peaking at No. 60. However, it is a Top 20 hit on the Hot Soul Singles charts, peaking at No. 19.

== Chart performance ==
Chart (1981)	Peak position
US Billboard Hot 100	60
US Billboard Hot Soul Singles	19
