= 10½ (album) =

Studio album by The Dramatics
- Released: 1980
- Studios: Sigma Sound, Philadelphia, Pennsylvania; Total Experience, Hollywood, California; Ocean Way, Hollywood, California; Record Plant, Los Angeles, California; The Sound Suite, Detroit, Michigan; United Sound, Detroit, Michigan
- Length: 45:21
- Label: MCA
- Producers: Larry "L.J." Reynolds, Ron Banks

The Dramatics chronology
Anytime, Anyplace (1979)	10½ (1980)	The Dramatic Way (1980)

10½ is a studio album by the Dramatics released in 1980 on MCA Records. The album reached No. 14 on the Billboard Top Soul Albums chart.

== Overview ==
10½ was produced by Dramatics members Larry "L.J." Reynolds and Ron Banks.

== Singles ==
Welcome Back Home reached No. 9 on the Billboard Hot Soul Songs chart.

== Critical reception ==
Professional ratings
Review scores
Source	Rating
Allmusic	4.5/5 stars

Ron Wynn of Allmusic gave a four out of five stars review saying "A celebratory album that marked their being together for over a decade, this was one of the group's best MCA/ABC albums".

== Tracklisting ==
No.	Title	Writer(s)	Length
1.	"Music Is the Peoples Choice"	Cecil Womack, Ron Banks	5:54
2.	"Welcome Back Home"	Raymond Johnson, Ron Banks	6:47
3.	"Runnin' From My Love"	Raymond Johnson, Ron Banks, Tony Green	4:55
4.	"Love Is Here"	Kenneth Gamble, Leon Huff	5:29
5.	"I Just Wanna Dance the Night Away"	Larry "L.J." Reynolds	7:33
6.	"If You Feel Like You Wanna Dance, Dance"	Larry "L.J." Reynolds, Martinus Montgomery	5:55
7.	"It Ain't Rainin' (On Nobody's House But Mine)"	Larry "L.J." Reynolds	6:04
8.	"Be With the One You Love"	Larry "L.J." Reynolds	3:37

== Personnel ==
- Darnell Kimbrough, Cecil Womack, Dennis Harris, T.J. Tindall, Roland Bautista - guitars
- Raymond Johnson, Carlton "Cotton" Kent, Rudy Robinson - keyboards
- Vassal Benford - synthesizers
- Greg Phillinganes - piano, Moog synthesizers
- Robert Lyle - Clavinet, Rhodes and acoustic piano
- John Brinson - electric piano
- Nathan Lamarr Watts, Tony Green, James Williams - bass
- Marvin Webb, Ricky Lawson, Darrell Jennings, Jerome "Jerry" Jones - drums
- Lorenzo Brown "Bag of Tricks", Kenneth Hudson, Carl "Butch" Small - percussion
- Kerry Campbell - saxophone
- Mike Patillo and The Dramatics - backing vocals

== Production ==
- Arranged by [Horns & Strings] – Donald Cooke, George Del Barrio, John Brinson, Larry "L.J." Reynolds, Wayne Henderson
- Arranged by [Rhythm] – John Brinson, Larry "L.J." Reynolds, Raymond Johnson, Ron Banks, Rudy (?), Tony Green
- Coordinator [Album] – Louella Jackson
- Coordinator [Production] – Brian Spears, Cynthia Sissle, Louella Jackson
- Engineer [Mixing] – Allen Sides, Ellis "Pete" Bishop, Rick Gianatos
- Engineer [Re-mix] – Ellis "Pete" Bishop
- Engineer [Recording] – B. Benton, Dave Boyer, David Latman, Derk Devlin, J. Kaufman, Jeffrey Stewart, Jim Gallagher, Michael Evans, Michael Grace, Ellis "Pete" Bishop, Terry Tuck, Ty Blair, W. Borchers, Warren Woods
- Executive-Producer – Don Davis
- Management – Forest Hamilton Personnal
- Mastered by – Bernie Grundman
- Producer – Larry "L.J." Reynolds, Ron Banks
