= Chance Encounter (album) =

Studio album by Ramsey Lewis
- Released: 1982
- Studio: CBS Recording Studios, New York, New York; PS Studios, Chicago, Illinois
- Genre: Jazz
- Length: 35:33
- Label: Columbia
- Producer: George Butler (Exec.), Ramsey Lewis

Ramsey Lewis chronology
Three Piece Suite (1981)	Chance Encounter (1982)	Les Fleurs (1983)

Professional ratings
Review scores
Source	Rating
AllMusic	2/5 stars
The Rolling Stone Album Guide	3/5 stars

Chance Encounter is a studio album by American jazz pianist Ramsey Lewis, released in 1982 on Columbia Records. The album reached No. 16 on the Billboard Top Jazz Albums chart.

== Track listing ==
No.	Title	Writer(s)	Length
1.	"What's Going On"	Renaldo Benson, Al Cleveland, Marvin Gaye	4:52
2.	"Chance Encounter"	Ramsey Lewis	4:50
3.	"Up Where We Belong"	Jack Nitzsche	3:59
4.	"Intimacy"	Ramsey Lewis	5:09
5.	"A Special Place"	B. Dickens	4:35
6.	"Paradise"	R. Irving III	5:10
7.	"I Can't Wait"	B. Dickens	3:54
8.	"Just a Little Ditty"	B. Dickens	3:04

== Personnel ==
- Ramsey Lewis - grand piano, electric piano
- Bill Dickens - bass guitar
- Frank Donaldson - drums
- Byron Gregory - guitar, sitar
- Geraldo de Oliveira - percussion
- Tom Tom 84 - percussion
- Tim Tobias - synthesizer
- Ellen Samuels - backing vocals
- Benny Diggs - vocals
- Kevin Owens - vocals
- Aaron Mills - bass
- Morris Jennings - drums
- T. C. Campbell - electric piano
- Morris Gray - lead vocals
- Pat Shannon - lead vocals
- Scott Litt - engineer

== Charts ==
Chart positions for Chance Encounter
Chart (1982)	Peak position
Billboard Jazz Albums	10
