= Secret Island =

Studio album by Bobby Lyle
- Released: September 24, 1992
- Studio: Ocean Way Recording (Hollywood, California); Castle Oaks Studios (Los Angeles, California)
- Genre: Jazz; R&B
- Length: 46:49
- Label: Atlantic
- Producer: Bobby Lyle

Bobby Lyle chronology
Pianomagic (1991)	Secret Island (1992)	Rhythm Stories (1994)

Professional ratings
Review scores
Source	Rating
AllMusic	3/5 stars

Secret Island is a studio album by jazz keyboardist Bobby Lyle, released in September 1992 on Atlantic Records. The album peaked at No. 8 on the US Billboard Top Contemporary Jazz Albums chart.

== Track listing ==
No.	Title	Writer(s)	Length
1.	"Secret Island"	Bobby Lyle	4:54
2.	"Spirit Song (Come Together)"	Bobby Lyle	5:24
3.	"Sandance"	Bobby Lyle	5:31
4.	"Paradise Cove"	Bobby Lyle	5:10
5.	"Rain Forest"	Bobby Lyle	3:08
6.	"Jamming"	Bob Marley	5:19
7.	"Flight to Rio"	Bobby Lyle	5:09
8.	"Heart of a Woman"	Bobby Lyle	6:07
9.	"St. Thomas"	Sonny Rollins	3:42
10.	"Rain Forest" (Reprise)	Bobby Lyle	2:37

== Personnel ==
- Bobby Lyle – keyboards (1–4, 6–9), acoustic piano (5, 10), synthesizers (5, 10)
- Joe Wolfe – synthesizer programming (2)
- Ricardo Silveira – guitars (1, 7)
- Dwight Sills – guitars (2, 3)
- Darrell Crooks – guitars (3, 8)
- Paul Jackson Jr. – guitars (4, 6)
- John Patitucci – bass (1, 7)
- Larry Kimpel – bass (2–4, 6, 8)
- Gerald Albright – bass fills (2)
- Michael Baker – drums (1–3, 7, 8)
- Leon "Ndugu" Chancler – drums (4, 6), timbales (6)
- Paulinho da Costa – percussion (1, 9)
- Stanley Benders – percussion (2–4, 6, 7)
- James Perkins – saxophone (1, 3, 8), tenor saxophone (2)
- Kirk Whalum – soprano saxophone (2), saxophone (6)
- Tanya Boyd – vocals (2, 6)
- Alexandra Brown – vocals (2, 6)
- Tony Novell – vocals (2, 6)
- Tony Warren – vocals (2, 6)

== Production ==
- Bobby Lyle – producer, arrangements
- Mike Aarvold – recording
- Danny Leake – recording, mixing
- Michael C. Ross – recording
- Noel Hazen – assistant engineer
- Frankie Jones – assistant engineer
- Paul Scriver – assistant engineer
- Chris Zerbe – assistant engineer
- Bernie Grundman – mastering at Bernie Grundman Mastering (Hollywood, California)
- Melanie Nissen – art direction
- Lynn Kowalewski – design
- Darren Keith – photography
- David K – wardrobe stylist
- Douglas Gibson – wardrobe stylist
- Billian Entertainment – management
