= Love Is a Game =

Love Is a Game may refer to:

- "Love Is a Game", an episode of the television series He's Into Her, 2021
- "Love Is a Game", a song by Grave Digger from the album Witch Hunter, 1985
- "Love Is a Game", a song by Morris Day from the album Daydreaming, 1987
- "Love Is a Game", a song by Adele from the album 30, 2021
- "Love Is a Game", a 2002 song by Dean Miller
- "Love Is a Game", a song by Lights from the album A6Extended, 2025
