= Deep Soul (album) =

Studio album by Ronnie Laws
- Released: 1992
- Studio: Wide Tracks Studios (Hollywood, California)
- Genre: Jazz
- Label: Par Records
- Producer: Ronnie Laws

Ronnie Laws chronology
Identity (1990)	Deep Soul (1992)	Brotherhood (1993)

Deep Soul is a studio album by American saxophonist Ronnie Laws, released in 1992 by Par Records. The album reached No. 6 on the Billboard Contemporary Jazz Albums chart.

== Guest performers ==
Artists such as Philip Bailey and Leon "Ndugu" Chancler appear on the album.

== Critical reception ==
Professional ratings
Review scores
Source	Rating
AllMusic	3/5 stars

AllMusic gave Deep Soul a 3/5 star rating.

== Track listing ==
No.	Title	Writer(s)	Length
1.	"Tonite's the Night"	Rob Mullins	4:44
2.	"Believe It or Not"	James Taylor	3:58
3.	"Harvest for the World"	The Isley Brothers	3:23
4.	"Blue Indigo"	Larry Dunn	4:58
5.	"After Midnight"	Noel Classen, Ronnie Laws, Wayne Henderson	4:36
6.	"Stairway to the Stars"	Matt Malneck, Mitchell Parish	3:26
7.	"Big Daddy Swing"	Ronnie Laws	4:03
8.	"All the Way Back Home"	Ronnie Laws	4:06
9.	"Lonesome Journey"	Ronnie Laws	4:23
10.	"Still Always There"	Ronnie Laws, William Jeffrey	5:30
11.	"So Far, So Near"	Ronnie Laws	4:27
12.	"Blues in the 5th Ward"	Ronnie Laws, Wayne Henderson	4:42

== Personnel ==
- Ronnie Laws – soprano saxophone (1), saxophone (2, 5, 8, 9), tenor saxophone (3, 6, 7, 10–12), alto saxophone (4), piccolo flute (11)
- Rob Mullins – keyboards
- Noel Classen – keyboards (2, 5, 8, 9), synthesizer programming (2, 5, 8, 9, 11), bass (2, 5, 8, 9, 11), drums (2, 5, 8, 9)
- Dwight Sills – guitars (1, 3–5, 7–10, 12)
- Nathaniel Philips – bass (1, 3, 4, 7, 10, 12)
- Craig T. Cooper – bass (9)
- William "Bubba" Bryant – drums (1, 3, 7, 10, 12)
- Ndugu Chancler – drums (4)
- Rayford Griffin – drums (11)
- Wayne Henderson – trombone (7, 10, 11)
- Julie Delgado – backing vocals (3)
- Augie Johnson – backing vocals (3, 9)
- Gregory Matta – backing vocals (3, 9)
- Sandra Fairly – backing vocals (9)
- Philip Bailey – vocal scats (9)

=== Production ===
- Chuck Fassert – executive producer
- Douglas Kanner – executive producer
- Stuart Alan Love – executive producer
- Wayne Henderson – producer
- Steve Batte – engineer
- Eben Calderon – engineer
- Dennis Parker – engineer
- Brian Gardner – mastering at Bernie Grundman Mastering (Hollywood, California)
- Michael Jacoby – art direction
- Ansgar Hiller – graphic design
- Peter Figen – cover photography
