= True Spirit (Ronnie Laws album) =

Studio album by Ronnie Laws
- Released: 1989
- Recorded: 1989
- Studio: Wide Tracks Studios, Hollywood, California
- Genre: Jazz
- Length: 37:20
- Label: Par Records
- Producer: Ronnie Laws, Wayne Henderson

Ronnie Laws chronology
All Day Rhythm (1987)	True Spirit (1989)	Identity (1990)

Professional ratings
Review scores
Source	Rating
AllMusic	2/5 stars

True Spirit is a studio album by American saxophonist Ronnie Laws, produced by Laws and Wayne Henderson and released in 1989 via Par Records. The album peaked at No. 13 on the US Billboard Top Contemporary Jazz Albums chart.

== Guest performers ==
Artists such as Larry Dunn, Roland Bautista and Fred White of Earth, Wind & Fire, Joe Sample and Bobby Lyle of the Crusaders as well as Nathan East appear on the album.

== Track listing ==
No.	Title	Writer(s)	Length
1.	"Gotta Say Goodbye"	Ronnie Laws	4:56
2.	"Love This Way Again"	Larry Dunn	5:24
3.	"Virgin Winds (Before the Rainfall)"	Wayne Henderson	4:07
4.	"From a Glance"	William Jeffrey	4:52
5.	"Song for Hiram"	P.J. Kelly, Ronnie Laws	3:02
6.	"Heart Station"	Ronnie Laws	5:15
7.	"Favorite Love"	Ronnie Laws	4:35
8.	"Imo"	Ronnie Laws	5:24

== Credits ==
- Bass guitar – Nathan East, Nathan Watts
- Chimes, keyboard, synth (synth strings) – Terry Marshall
- Drums – Art Rodriquez, Fred White, Ndugu Chancler, Raymond Pounds
- Rhythm guitar – Roland Bautista, Pat Kelly
- Keyboards – Larry Dunn
- Piano – Barnaby Finch, Bobby Lyle, Joe Sample
- Producer - Wayne Henderson
- Producer, soprano saxophone, synthesizer, tenor saxophone – Ronnie Laws
