= Pressure Sensitive =

Studio album by Ronnie Laws
- Released: 1975; 1991 (re-release)
- Recorded: March–April 1975
- Studio: Angel City Sound, Los Angeles, California
- Genre: Jazz fusion, jazz funk
- Length: 34:54
- Label: Blue Note
- Producer: George Butler, Wayne Henderson

Ronnie Laws chronology
Pressure Sensitive (1975)	Fever (1976)

Pressure Sensitive is the debut album by American saxophonist Ronnie Laws released in 1975 by Blue Note. It was produced by George Butler and Wayne Henderson of the Crusaders. The album reached No. 25 on the Billboard Top Soul Albums chart.

== Reception ==
Professional ratings
Review scores
Source	Rating
AllMusic	4.5/5 stars
The Rolling Stone Jazz Record Guide	3/5 stars
The Penguin Guide to Jazz Recordings	2/4 stars

The AllMusic review by Scott Yanow stated, "this obviously commercial effort (every song fades out before it hits the five-minute mark) can only be recommended in comparison to Ronnie Laws's later more inferior recordings."

== Track listing ==
No.	Title	Writer(s)	Length
1.	"Always There"	William Jeffrey, Ronnie Laws	4:52
2.	"Momma"	Roland Bautista	4:20
3.	"Never Be the Same"	Roland Bautista, Mike Cavanaugh, Ronnie Laws	4:23
4.	"Tell Me Something Good"	Stevie Wonder	4:50
5.	"Nothing to Lose"	Ronnie Laws	4:54
6.	"Tidal Wave"	William Jeffrey	4:08
7.	"Why Do You Laugh at Me?"	Wayne Henderson	3:55
8.	"Mis' Mary's Place"	Ronnie Laws	3:32

== Personnel ==
- Ronnie Laws - tenor saxophone, soprano saxophone, flute
- Jerry Peters - electric piano, synthesizer
- Mike Cavanaugh, Joe Sample - clavinet, electric piano
- Roland Bautista - guitar
- John Rowin - guitar (tracks 2, 3 & 5)
- Wilton Felder (track 6), Clint Mosley (tracks 1–5, 7 & 8) - electric bass
- Steve Guttierez (tracks 1–5, 7 & 8), Michael Willars (track 6) - drums
- Joe Clayton - conga, tambourine, flexatone (track 1)
- Side Effect - backing vocals (track 2)
