= Keep You Satisfied =

Studio album by Nancy Wilson
- Released: April 1985
- Studio: Nippon Columbia Studio, Tokyo, Japan
- Genre: Vocal jazz
- Length: 40:34
- Label: Columbia
- Producer: Kiyoshi Itoh

Nancy Wilson chronology
The Two of Us (1984)	Keep You Satisfied (1985)	Forbidden Lover (1987)

Professional ratings
Review scores
Source	Rating
AllMusic	3/5 stars

Keep You Satisfied is a studio album by American jazz singer Nancy Wilson released by Columbia Records in 1985. The album reached No. 16 on the Billboard Traditional Jazz Albums chart.

== Background ==
Produced by Kiyoshi Itoh, Keep You Satisfied was recorded at Nippon Columbia Studio, Tokyo, Japan. Harmonica player Toots Thielemans also made a guest appearance on the album.

== Critical reception ==
Ron Wynn of Allmusic called Keep You Satisfied "Another classy '80s album from Nancy Wilson".

== Track listing ==
No.	Title	Writer(s)	Length
1.	"Just to Keep You in My Life"		4:24
2.	"American Wedding Song"		4:59
3.	"We've Got Love"		5:01
4.	"Early Morning"	Gamble and Huff	3:21
5.	"Winter Green and Summer Blue"		3:50
6.	"Just to Keep You Satisfied"	Anna Gordy Gaye, Marvin Gaye, Elgie Stover	5:53
7.	"Is It Too Late"		3:26
8.	"Heaven Bound"	Dennis Linde	3:49
9.	"Careless Whisper"	George Michael, Andrew Ridgeley	4:53
10.	"If We Were Lovers"		4:33

== Charts ==
Chart (1986)	Peak position
US Traditional Jazz Albums (Billboard)	16
