= Solid Ground (Ronnie Laws album) =

Studio album by Ronnie Laws
- Released: 1981
- Studio: Indigo Ranch Studio (Malibu, California): Concorde Recording Studios (Los Angeles, California)
- Genre: Jazz
- Label: Liberty
- Producer: Ronnie Laws

Ronnie Laws chronology
Every Generation (1980)	Solid Ground (1981)	Mr. Nice Guy (1983)

Singles from What Am I Crying For
- 1. "Stay Awake" Released: 1981; 2. "There's A Way" Released: 1981

Professional ratings
Review scores
Source	Rating
AllMusic	2.5/5 stars

Solid Ground is the sixth studio album by American saxophonist Ronnie Laws released in 1981 by Liberty Records. The album reached No. 17 on the Billboard Top Soul Albums chart.

== Track listing ==
No.	Title	Writer(s)	Length
1.	"Heavy On Easy"	Ronnie Laws	4:06
2.	"There's A Way"	Dave Boruff, Ronnie Laws	3:57
3.	"Stay Awake"	Ronnie Laws	4:09
4.	"Solid Ground"	Ronnie Laws	4:34
5.	"Your Stuff"	Denzil "Broadway" Miller, Ronnie Laws	3:38
6.	"Just As You Are"	Ronnie Laws	3:59
7.	"Summer Fool"	Ronnie Laws	4:07
8.	"Good Feelings"	Ronnie Laws	4:21

== Personnel ==
- Ronnie Laws – acoustic piano (1, 6), soprano saxophone (1, 2, 4–7), tenor saxophone (1), lead vocals (2, 3, 5, 7), backing vocals (3), alto saxophone (3, 8), alto flute (4), sopranino saxophone (5)
- Larry Dunn – Minimoog (1, 3, 4, 6, 7), Moog bass (1)
- Barnaby Finch – acoustic piano (1–4, 8)
- Denzil "Broadway" Miller – acoustic piano (5), Minimoog (5), Oberheim OB-X (5), Fender Rhodes (6)
- Roland Bautista – guitars (1, 4)
- Pat Kelly – guitars (2, 3, 7, 8)
- Leon Johnson – bass (1–4, 6–8)
- William Bryant – drums (1–5, 7, 8)
- Raymond Pounds – drums (6)
- Munyungo Jackson – percussion (1)
- Hubert Laws – flute (5)
- Frank Kavelin – string arrangements (8)
- Marlena Jeter – backing vocals (2, 5, 7, 8)
- Gwenche Machu – backing vocals (2, 5, 7)
- Debra Laws – backing vocals (7)
- Maxi Anderson – backing vocals (8)
- Eloise Laws – backing vocals (8)

=== Production ===
- Ronnie Laws – producer
- Chris Brunt – chief engineer
- Gerry Brown – assistant overdub engineer
- William Jeffrey – production assistant
- Bill Burks – art direction
- Scott Thorn – back cover illustration
- Amy Nagasawa – inner sleeve design
- Tom Gibson – photography
- L.D. Gordon – background photography
- Pete Turner – background photography
- Phil Casey and Forest Hamilton Management – management

== Charts ==
Album

Chart (1981)	Peak position
US Billboard 200	51
US Billboard Top Black Albums	17
UK Albums	100

Singles

Year	Single	Chart	Position
1981	"Stay Awake"	US Billboard Hot 100	60
1981	"Stay Awake"	US Billboard Hot Soul Singles	19
1981	"There's A Way"	US Billboard Hot Soul Singles	75
