= Come and Get Yourself Some =

Studio album by Leon Haywood
- Released: October 1975
- Recorded: 1975
- Genres: Rhythm and blues; quiet storm; smooth soul
- Length: 32:08
- Label: 20th Century
- Producer: Leon Haywood

Leon Haywood chronology
Keep It in the Family (1974)	Come and Get Yourself Some (1975)	Intimate (1976)

Singles from Come and Get Yourself Some
- 1. "Believe Half of What You See (And None of What You Hear)" Released: 1974; 2. "Come an' Get Yourself Some" Released: 1975; 3. "I Want'a Do Something Freaky to You" Released: 1975; 4. "Just Your Fool" Released: 1976

Professional ratings
Review scores
Source	Rating
AllMusic	4/5 stars

Come and Get Yourself Some is the sixth studio album by American musician Leon Haywood. It was released in 1975 through 20th Century Records, making it his third album for the label. Production was handled by Haywood. The album peaked at number 140 on the Billboard Top LPs and Tape chart and number 21 on the Soul LPs chart in the United States.

Four singles were released from the album. "Believe Half of What You See (And None of What You Hear)", "Come an' Get Yourself Some", "I Want'a Do Something Freaky to You", and "Just Your Fool". The lead single reached No. 94 on the Billboard Hot 100 and No. 21 on the Hot Soul Singles chart. The second single, "Come an' Get Yourself Some", reached No. 83 on the Billboard Hot 100 and No. 19 on the Hot Soul Singles chart. The third single, "I Want'a Do Something Freaky to You" peaked at No. 15 on the Billboard Hot 100 and No. 7 on the Hot Soul Singles chart. The fourth and final single, "Just Your Fool", reached No. 26 on the Hot Soul Singles chart.

== Track listing ==
No.	Title	Writer(s)	Length
1.	"Come and Get Yourself Some"	Rich Cason	3:26
2.	"This Feeling's Rated Extra"	Leon Haywood	3:44
3.	"I Want'a Do Something Freaky to You"	Haywood	5:52
4.	"Who You Been Giving It Up To"	Haywood	2:48
5.	"You Need a Friend Like Mine"	Frederick Knight	3:00
6.	"Consider the Source"	Haywood	3:57
7.	"Just Your Fool"	Haywood; Maria Tynes	3:27
8.	"I Know What Love Is"	Elaine McQueen; Marshall McQueen, Jr.	3:12
9.	"Believe Half of What You See (And None of What You Hear)"	Haywood	2:42
Total length:			32:08

== Personnel ==
- Leon Haywood – electric piano, Moog synthesizer, organ, horns and rhythm arrangement, producer
- Wilton Felder – bass
- Tony Drake – guitar
- Ray Parker Jr. – guitar
- David T. Walker – guitar
- Melvin "Wah Wah Watson" Ragin – guitar
- Roland Bautista – guitar
- Dean Parks – guitar
- Ed Greene – drums
- Joe L. Clayton – congas
- Bobbye Hall – congas
- Gary Coleman – vibraphone
- Larry Nash – piano
- Joe Sample – piano
- Vince Charles – steel drums
- Gene Page – horns and strings arrangement, rhythm arrangement (tracks: 2, 3)
- James Mitchell – horns arrangement
- John Mills – engineering, mixing
- Stan Ross – engineering (track 3)
- Bob Levy – photography
- Buddy Rosenberg – photography

== Charts ==
Chart (1975)	Peak position
US Billboard 200	140
US Top R&B/Hip-Hop Albums (Billboard)	21
