= The Two of Us (Ramsey Lewis and Nancy Wilson album) =

Studio album by Ramsey Lewis & Nancy Wilson
- Released: September 1984
- Genre: Jazz
- Label: Columbia
- Producer: Stanley Clarke

Ramsey Lewis chronology
Les Fleurs (1983)	The Two of Us (1984)	Fantasy (1985)

Nancy Wilson chronology
Godsend (1984)	The Two of Us (1984)	Keep You Satisfied (1985)

The Two of Us is a studio album by American jazz pianist Ramsey Lewis and American jazz singer Nancy Wilson, released in 1984 on Columbia Records and produced by Stanley Clarke. The album peaked at No. 5 on the Billboard Traditional Jazz Albums chart.

== Track listing ==
Track listing for The Two of Us
No.	Title	Writer(s)	Length
1.	"Ram"	Ramsey Lewis, Nancy Wilson	5:14
2.	"Midnight Rendezvous"	David Roberts	3:52
3.	"Breaker Beat"	Ramsey Lewis, Robert Brookins, Stanley Clarke	4:16
4.	"Slippin' Away"
5.	Untitled	David Foster, David Paich, Leon Ware	4:43
6.	"The Two of Us"	Jeremy Lubbock, Vassal Benford	4:31
7.	"Quiet Storm"	Ramsey Lewis, Stanley Clarke	4:12
8.	"Never Wanna Say Goodnight"	Ellen Schwartz, Franne Golde, Roger Bruno	3:14
9.	"Closer Than Close"	Patrick Henderson, Vassal Benford	4:56
10.	"Song with Words (Remembering)"	Ramsey Lewis	5:00

== Personnel ==
- Lead vocals – Daryl Coley, Nancy Wilson
- Backing vocals – Freida Woody, Josie James, Lynn Davis, Marcy Levy
- Bass – Freddie Washington, Stanley Clarke
- Concert grand piano [Steinway Concert Grand] – Ramsey Lewis
- Drums – John Robinson, Ricky Lawson
- Guitar – Paul Jackson Jr.
- Keyboards – Don Freeman
- Narrator – Celia Kitengeth
- Piano – Vassal Benford
- Sitar – Stanley Clarke
- Strings – Barbara Hunter, Bill Hughes, Bonnie Douglas, Brenton Banks, Catherine Gotthoffer, Christine Ermacoff, James Getzoff, Janet Lakatos, Karen Jones, Murray Adler, Norman Carr, Paul Shure, Roland Kato, Ronald Folsom
- Synthesizer – Robert Brookins, Rory Kaplan
- String arrangements by George del Barrio
- Engineer – Erik Zobler
- Assistant engineers – Duncan Aldrich, Gary Wagner, Jeff Vaughn, Mitch Gibson, Paul Erikson
- Executive producer – Dr. George Butler
- Mastered by Bernie Grundman
- Produced by Stanley Clarke
- Remixed by Don Hahn
