= Fantasy (Ramsey Lewis album) =

Studio album by Ramsey Lewis
- Released: 1985
- Genre: Jazz
- Label: Columbia
- Producer: Morris 'Butch' Stewart, Maurice White

Ramsey Lewis chronology
The Two of Us (1984)	Fantasy (1985)	Keys to the City (1987)

Fantasy is a studio album by American jazz pianist Ramsey Lewis, released in 1985 on Columbia Records. It was produced by Morris Stewart and Maurice White.

The album reached No. 13 on the Cashbox Jazz Albums chart.

== Critical reception ==
Professional ratings
Review scores
Source	Rating
AllMusic	2/5 stars

Chris Albertson of Stereo Review wrote: "With a little help from Maurice White, his former drummer who hit pop gold with Earth, Wind & Fire, the fifty-year-old pianist has armed himself with synthesizers and come up with a set of sounds that will have a much younger generation gyrating and bopping in the strobe lights."

Peter Sleight of the Sun Sentinel stated: "Fantasy, by keyboardist Ramsey Lewis, could be found in any department of the music store. It'll probably show up in jazz simply because of Lewis' long affiliation with jazz. But the recording is clearly non- denominational, drawing equally from jazz, rock, New Wave and R&B." Sleight added: "It succeeds because Lewis has found the secret to electronic instruments: They must be used judiciously, and for the purpose to which they are best suited. To avoid the one-note, one-rhythm pounding that flaws most android music, Lewis creates many layers of electronic tracks. The result is intricate, exotic and unremittingly funky, with Lewis' keyboard melody always rising above the din."

== Track listing ==
Track listing for Fantasy
No.	Title	Writer(s)	Length
1.	"This Ain't No Fantasy"	Morris "Butch" Stewart, Patrick Leonard	4:15
2.	"Ram Jam"	Laney Stewart, Morris "Butch" Stewart	3:59
3.	"It's Gonna Change"	Lonnie Reaves, Morris "Butch" Stewart	4:23
4.	"Les Clefs of Mon Coeur"	Laney Stewart, Morris "Butch" Stewart, Ramsey Lewis	3:50
5.	"Victim of a Broken Heart"	Brenda Mitchell, Morris "Butch" Stewart	4:06
6.	"Slow Dancin'"	Morris "Butch" Stewart, Ramsey Lewis	4:14
7.	"Never Give Up"	Brenda Mitchell, Morris "Butch" Stewart	4:57
8.	"Part of Me feat. Maurice White"	Brenda Mitchell, Morris "Butch" Stewart	4:33
9.	"The Quest"	Morris "Butch" Stewart, Ramsey Lewis	5:27
