= Tender Togetherness =

Studio album by Stanley Turrentine
- Released: April 1981
- Recorded: February – April 1981
- Studios: Indigo Ranch, Malibu, California
- Genre: Jazz
- Label: Elektra
- Producer: Larry Dunn

Stanley Turrentine chronology
Use the Stairs (1980)	Tender Togetherness (1981)	Home Again (1983)

Tender Togetherness is a studio album by tenor saxophonist Stanley Turrentine, released in April 1981 on Elektra Records. The album reached No. 13 on the Billboard Jazz Albums chart.

== Critical reception ==
Professional ratings
Review scores
Source	Rating
AllMusic	3.5/5 stars
The Rolling Stone Jazz Record Guide	2/5 stars

With a 3.5 out of 5 star rating, Steve Leggett of Allmusic claimed "Tender Togetherness featured an electric jazz-funk hybrid sound that packed a good deal more punch and brightness than its predecessor, 1979's Betcha. Produced by Earth, Wind & Fire's Larry Dunn (EW&F's "After the Love Has Gone" is given a treatment here), and featuring a subtle, almost Latin feel, the album bounces and bubbles along on an almost continuous joyful light R&B groove."

== Track listing ==
No.	Title	Writer(s)	Length
1.	"Hermanos"	Eddie del Barrio, Larry Dunn	5:37
2.	"I'll Give You My Love"	Roland Bautista, Cavanaugh, Larry Dunn, Stanley Turrentine	4:02
3.	"Tamarac"	Larry Dunn, Steven Dunn	3:56
4.	"After The Love Has Gone (featuring Lynn Davis)"	Bill Champlin, David Foster, Jay Graydon	5:26

Side two
No.	Title	Writer(s)	Length
5.	"Cherubim"	Larry Dunn	5:39
6.	"Only You and Me (featuring Dianne Reeves)"	Eddie del Barrio, Larry Dunn, Roxanne Seeman	4:45
7.	"World Chimes"	Larry Dunn	4:25
8.	"Pure Love (Interlude)"	Larry Dunn, Denzil Miller Jr. Stanley Turrentine	0:43
9.	"Havin' Fun with Mr. T."	Chandler, Larry Dunn, Denzil Miller Jr., Byron Miller	3:44

== Personnel ==
=== Musicians ===
- Philip Bailey – Percussion, vocals, background vocals
- Roland Bautista – Guitar, electric guitar
- Leon "Ndugu" Chancler – Drums
- Paulinho Da Costa – Percussion
- Lynn Davis – Vocals
- Rahmlee Michael Davis – Trumpet, flugelhorn
- Eduardo del Barrio – Piano, electric piano, Fender Rhodes
- David Duke – French horn
- Steven Dunn – Percussion, drums, Moog bass
- Nathan East – Bass guitar, electric guitar
- Mike Harris – Trumpet, flugelhorn
- Jerry Hey – Trumpet, flugelhorn
- Marlena Jeter – Vocals
- Jeff Johnson – Synthesizer
- Ralph Johnson – Percussion
- Gwen Matthews – Vocals
- Byron Miller – Bass guitar
- Denzil Miller – Piano, electric piano, clavinet, Fender Rhodes
- Sidney Muldrow – French horn
- Don Myrick – Alto saxophone
- Tom Pigott Smith – Synthesizer
- Dianne Reeves – Vocals
- Bill Reichenbach Jr. – Bass trombone
- Louis Satterfield – Trombone
- Stanley Turrentine – Tenor saxophone
- Fred White – Percussion, drums
- Andrew Woolfolk – Tenor saxophone

=== Production ===
- Philip Bailey – Arranger
- Roland Bautista – Arranger
- George del Barrio – Conductor, string arrangements
- Leon "Ndugu" Chancler – Arranger, drums
- Lynn Davis – Vocal arrangement
- Rahmlee Michael Davis – Horn arrangements
- Eduardo del Barrio – Arranger
- Larry Dunn – Arranger, producer, vocal arrangement
- Steven Dunn – Arranger
- Mike Harris – Horn arrangements
- Denzil Miller – Arranger, vocal arrangement
- Don Myrick – Horn arrangements
- Louis Satterfield – Horn arrangements

== Charts ==
Chart (1981)	Peak position
US Jazz Albums (Billboard)	13
