= Fishnet (song) =

Song by Morris Day

from the album Daydreaming
- B-side: "Maybe"
- Released: February 1988
- Genre: R&B/funk. New Jack Swing
- Length: 3:58 (edit)
- Label: Warner Bros.
- Songwriters: Morris Day, James Harris III, Terry Lewis
- Producers: Jimmy Jam and Terry Lewis for Flyte Time Productions, Inc. Morris Day (co-producer for Concentrix Productions, Inc.)

"Fishnet" is a 1988 single by the former lead singer of The Time, Morris Day. The single was Day's most successful solo hit, peaking at number 23 on the Hot 100, (becoming his only Top 40 hit as a solo artist) and reaching number one on the soul singles chart, for two weeks. "Fishnet" also peaked at number 12 on the dance charts.

== Charts ==
Chart (1988)	Peak position
Italy Airplay (Music & Media)	17
