= Guaranteed (Morris Day album) =

Studio album by Morris Day
- Released: 1992
- Genre: R&B/funk/new jack swing
- Length: 46:32
- Label: Reprise
- Producer: Various

Morris Day chronology
Daydreaming (1987)	Guaranteed (1992)	It's About Time (2004)

Guaranteed is the third solo album by the American R&B singer Morris Day. It was released in 1992. The album adopted a different sound than Day's previous efforts. Focusing on new jack swing, it had more input from outside producers and composers than Day's previous projects. It was commercially unsuccessful. Big Daddy Kane raps on "Angel Don't".

== Critical reception ==
Professional ratings
Review scores
Source	Rating
AllMusic	2/5 stars
The Indianapolis Star	3/4 stars

The Indianapolis Star wrote: "Day has a new set of priorities on his third solo disc, trading his cartoonish, mirror-toting image for one closer to that of a hip, socially conscious adult." The St. Petersburg Times concluded that, "minus his royal slyness, the material slumps by on a tepid serving of refried new-jack beats." The Orange County Register determined that the "wan funk and tepid R&B balladry only shows that the sun has set on this Day."

== Track listing ==
1. "Gimme Whatcha Got" – 5:28 composed by Bernard Belle
2. "Circle of Love" – 4:17 composed by Sharon Barnes, Morris Day, Michael Stokes
3. "Deeper" – 4:05 composed by Patrick Adams, Stanley Brown, Morris Day
4. "My Special" – 3:42 composed by Patrick Adams, Skeff Anselm, Morris Day, Emmanuel Rahiem LeBlanc, James Mosley
5. "Everlasting" – 5:01 composed by Sharon Barnes, Morris Day, Michael Stokes
6. "Guaranteed" – 5:50 composed by Bernard Belle, Greg Curtis
7. "Angel Don't" – 4:15 composed by Benjamin Belfield, Bernard Belle, Morris Day, Michael Stokes, Clint Stokes III
8. "Changes" – 5:26 composed by Morris Day, Michael Stokes
9. "Meant to Be Together" – 4:05 composed by Stanley Brown
10. "Who's That Girl" – 4:33 composed by Sharon Barnes, John Bokowski, Morris Day, Michael Stokes

== Personnel ==
- Guitar – Charles Fearing, Emmanuel Rahiem LeBlanc, Kewko Vanderpuy
- Engineering – Frank Byron, F. Byron Clark, Foley Folie, Dante Gioia, Rich July, Brian Kinkay, Dennis Mitchell, Bruce Moore, John Parthum, Paris Robinson, Clint Stokes III, Michael Stokes, Boon Tan
- Keyboards – Houston Bowen, Josh Milan, Clint Stokes III, Michael Stokes, Gordon Williams
- Mastering – Bernie Grundman
- Mixing – Bernard Belle, Frank Byron, F. Byron Clark, Brian Kinkay, Dennis Mitchell, John Parthum, Thom Russo, Boon Tan, Dave Way, Willie Will
- Producer – Morris Day, Bernard Belle, Stanley Brown, Karen Jones, Benny Medina, Michael Stokes
- Programming – Skeff Anselm, John Bokowski, Gordon Williams
- Rap – Big Daddy Kane
- Vocals - Morris Day (lead), Patrick Adams, Judi Day, Alice Echols, Rick Nelson, Louis Price, Marsha Sapp, Linda Stokes, Spencer Washington
