= Color of Success =

Studio album by Morris Day
- Released: September 11, 1985
- Studio: Indigo Ranch Studios, Malibu, California
- Genre: Contemporary R&B; funk
- Length: 35:33
- Label: Warner Bros.
- Producer: Morris Day

Morris Day chronology
Color of Success (1985)	Daydreaming (1987)

Singles from Color of Success
- 1. "The Oak Tree" Released: 1985; 2. "The Color Of Success" Released: 1985; 3. "The Character" Released: 1985; 4. "Love Sign" Released: 1985

Color of Success is the debut studio album by the funk/R&B singer, Morris Day released in 1985 on Warner Bros. Records. This album has been certified Gold in the US by the RIAA.

== Background ==
Released a year after departing previous band The Time, the album is similar in style to The Time's material, even going so far as to copy The Time's formula of six songs per album. The album's highlight is "The Oak Tree", a funky-pop number about a dance, akin to "The Bird" by The Time. The album was produced, arranged and composed by Day, who also played drums and keyboards throughout the album. Also on keyboards was Rickey "Freeze" Smith, who would later join Day in the revamped version of The Time in the mid-1990s.

== Critical reception ==
Professional ratings
Review scores
Source	Rating
AllMusic	4/5 stars
Rolling Stone	3/5 stars

James Henke of Rolling Stone, in a 3 out of 5 stars review, remarked "On his first solo album, former The Time singer Morris Day continues to play the role he perfected in Purple Rain that of the coolest, baddest dude around. Musically, this is uptempo R&B, not quite heavy on the synths as the Time's material was."

Rob Theakston of AllMusic wrote "The Color of Success offers to fans what Day does best, funky but accessible dance-pop music in the vein of many of his Minneapolis contemporaries. While the album runs a little bit on the short side, there is no filler and it is surprisingly consistent from start to finish."

== Track listing ==
No.	Title	Writer(s)	Length
1.	"Color of Success"	Morris Day	5:20
2.	"The Character"	Morris Day	4:07
3.	"The Oak Tree"	Morris Day	7:22
4.	"Love Sign"	Morris Day	6:22
5.	"Don't Wait For Me"	Morris Day	7:12
6.	"Love/Addiction"	Morris Day	5:10

== Credits ==
- Drums and percussion - Morris Day
- Drum programming - Steve Mitchell
- Engineer - Richard Kaplan
- Guitar - Horace Bokie Coleman Jr., Howie Rice, Roland Bautista, Tony Berg
- Mixing - Michael Brauer, Morris Day
- Piano - Greg Phillinganes
- Producer - Morris Day
- Synthesizer - Howie Rice, Larry Dunn, Morris Day, Ricky "Freeze" Smith, Steve Mitchell
- Vocals - Morris Day (lead), Angie Johnson, Bunny Hull, Clydene Jackson, Kit Hain, Mary Bridges, Maxayne Lewis, Mimi Brodsky, Sharon Robinson

== Charts ==
Chart (1985)	Peak position
U.S. Billboard 200	37
U.S. Billboard Top Black Albums	7
