= Keys to the City (Ramsey Lewis album) =

Studio album by Ramsey Lewis
- Released: May 1987
- Recorded: E & S Studios, Los Angeles, California; Home Sweet Home Studios, Evanston, Illinois; Streeterville Studios, Chicago, Illinois
- Genre: Jazz
- Length: 41:46
- Label: Columbia
- Producers: George Butler (exec), Maurice White, Morris Butch Stewart, Larry Dunn, Chris Brunt

Ramsey Lewis chronology
Fantasy (1985)	Keys to the City (1987)	Classic Encounter (1988)

Keys to the City is a studio album by American jazz pianist Ramsey Lewis, released in May 1987 on Columbia Records. The album peaked at No. 22 on the Billboard Top Contemporary Jazz Albums chart and No. 11 on the Cashbox Top Jazz Albums chart.

== Background ==
Keys to the City was recorded at E & S Studios in Los Angeles, California; Home Sweet Home Studio in Evanston, Illinois; and Streeterville Studios in Chicago, Illinois.

== Critical reception ==
Professional ratings
Review scores
Source	Rating
AllMusic	3/5 stars
The Rolling Stone Album Guide	3/5 stars

Frank White of The Atlanta Journal-Constitution noted "Veteran jazz piano player, Ramsey Lewis, who gave us the steamy, bluesy "In Crowd" so many years ago, still has one if the most engaging lyric conceptions in contemporary music. He lets the fire roar to the surface here." Jerry Shin of the Charlotte Observer in praise of the album wrote, "Is this jazz? You'll have to decide for yourself. When Lewis improvises on the Steinway, it's jazz. But there's a lot going on that demands some other definition. Jazz-flavoured Pop Rock, perhaps. But whatever you call it, it's bright, listenable, rocking and sometimes swinging music. If you're already a Ramsey Lewis fan, you'll probably love it."

== Track listing ==
No.	Title	Writer(s)	Length
1.	"Keys to the City"	Larry Dunn, Ramsey Lewis	5:57
2.	"You're Falling in Love"	Brenda Blonski, Morris (Butch) Stewart	5:17
3.	"7-11"	Maurice White, Robyn Smith	4:14
4.	"Strangers"	Chris Brunt, Larry Dunn, Luisa Justiz	4:48
5.	"My Love Will Lead You Home"	Morris (Butch) Stewart	6:15
6.	"Melody of Life"	Chris Brunt, Larry Dunn, Luisa Justiz	6:08
7.	"Shamballa"	Maurice White, Robyn Smith	4:11
8.	"Love and Understanding"	Larry Dunn, Luisa Justiz	4:56

== Personnel ==
- Ramsey Lewis - DX-7, Piano
- Roland Bautista - Guitar
- Tony Brown - Bass
- Chris Brunt - Drums, Percussion
- Chris Cameron - Synthesizer
- Larry Dunn - Bass, Drums, Keyboards, Percussion
- Steven Dunn - Drums, Percussion
- Byron Gregory - Electric guitar
- Luisa Justiz - Vocals
- Brenda Mitchell-Stewart - Background vocals
- Don Myrick - Saxophone
- Joe Pusteri - Percussion
- Bill Ruppert - Electric guitar
- Robyn Smith - Drum Programming, Percussion, Synthesizer
- Morris Stewart - Synthesizer, Background vocals
- Wayne Stewart - Drums
- Maurice White - Percussion

== Charts ==
Chart (1987)	Peak position
US Billboard Top Contemporary Jazz Albums	22
US Cashbox Jazz Albums	11
