= Mr. Nice Guy (album) =

Studio album by Ronnie Laws
- Released: September 24, 1983
- Studio: Lion Share Recording Studios and Spirit Studio (Los Angeles, California): Yamaha Studios (Glendale, California)
- Genre: Jazz
- Label: Capitol
- Producer: Ronnie Laws: Greg Mathieson

Ronnie Laws chronology
Solid Ground (1981)	Mr. Nice Guy (1983)	Classic Masters (1984)

Professional ratings
Review scores
Source	Rating
AllMusic	3/5 stars
Record Mirror	3/5 stars

Mr. Nice Guy is the seventh studio album by American saxophonist Ronnie Laws, released in 1983 by Capitol Records. The album reached No. 19 on the Billboard Traditional Jazz Albums chart and No. 24 on the Billboard Top Soul Albums chart.

== Singles ==
"In the Groove" reached No. 31 on the Billboard Hot Black Singles chart.

== Track listing ==
No.	Title	Writer(s)	Length
1.	"Can't Save Tomorrow"	Ronnie Laws	4:10
2.	"Mr. Nice Guy"	Ronnie Laws	3:44
3.	"In The Groove"	Greg Mathieson, Trevor Veitch	3:33
4.	"Third Hour"	Ronnie Laws	4:55
5.	"You"	Jackie English, Leon Johnson	4:05
6.	"Big Stars"	Ronnie Laws	5:25
7.	"Rolling"	Ronnie Laws	3:00
8.	"What Does It Take (To Win Your Love)"	Junior Walker	3:12
9.	"Off And On Again"	Ronnie Laws	3:49

== Personnel ==
- Ronnie Laws – lead vocals (1, 4, 5, 8, 9), backing vocals (1, 4), acoustic piano (1, 2, 4, 6, 9), Prophet-5 (1, 2, 4), baritone saxophone (1), soprano saxophone (1, 6, 7), vocals (2, 7), Oberheim OB-X (2, 6, 7), saxophone (2, 5, 8, 9), synthesizers (4), bass (4), tenor saxophone (4), Yamaha GS1 (6), Fender Rhodes (7), keyboards (9), synth bass (9), DMX programming (9)
- Larry Dunn – synth solo on bridge (1), Yamaha GS1 (4), Minimoog (5), Oberheim OB-X (5, 8), orchestra bells (5), synth intro (6, 9), synth bass (6)
- Greg Mathieson – keyboards (3), synthesizers (3)
- Michael Boddicker – synthesizers (3)
- Leon Johnson – Prophet programming (1, 4), bass (1, 5, 8, 9), drums (1), DMX programming (2), drum programming (4, 5), guitars (5)
- Greg "Harpo" Hiffman – acoustic piano (5), Fender Rhodes (5)
- Barnaby Finch – acoustic piano (8)
- Roland Bautista – guitars (1, 4, 9)
- Paul Jackson Jr. – guitars (3)
- Leland Sklar – bass (3)
- Michael Jochum – Simmons drums (2)
- Carlos Vega – drums (3)
- Steve Turner – Simmons drums (4)
- William Jeffrey – DMX programming (6, 7)
- Raymond Pounds – drums (8), drum fills (9)
- Lenny Castro – percussion (3)
- Mayuto Correa – percussion (6, 7)
- Debra Laws – backing vocals (4)
- Brenda Gooch – backing vocals (8)
- John Lehman – backing vocals (8)
- Myrna Matthews – backing vocals (8)
- Arnold McCuller – backing vocals (8)
- Maxi Anderson – backing vocals (9)
- Marlena Jeter – backing vocals (9)
- Gwenche Machu – backing vocals (9)

=== Production ===
- Ronnie Laws – producer (1, 2, 4–9)
- Greg Mathieson – producer (3)
- Gerry Brown – engineer, mixing
- Mike Brown – assistant engineer
- Artie Farkas – assistant engineer
- Fred Howard – assistant engineer
- Sinichi Katayama – assistant engineer
- Gene Wooley – assistant engineer
- Capitol Mastering (Hollywood, California) – mastering location
- William Jeffrey – music contractor
- Leon Johnson – music contractor
- Bill Burks – art direction
- Mac James – artwork, design
- Bobby Holland – photography
- Michael Brokaw – management
