= Routes (album) =

Studio album by Ramsey Lewis
- Released: 1980
- Genre: Jazz
- Label: Columbia
- Producer: Allen Toussaint, Larry Dunn

Ramsey Lewis chronology
| Ramsey (1979) | Routes (1980) | Three Piece Suite (1981) |

Routes is a studio album by American jazz pianist Ramsey Lewis, produced by Larry Dunn and Allen Toussaint and released in 1980 by Columbia Records. The album reached No. 7 on the Billboard Top Jazz Albums chart.

== Critical reception ==
Professional ratings
Review scores
| Source | Rating |
|---|---|
| AllMusic | 2.5/5 stars |
| The Encyclopedia of Popular Music | 3/5 stars |

The Washington Informer called the album "a mixture of African and Caribbean flavor," deeming it "a further extension of Ramsey Lewis' innovation." The Boston Globe called it "little more than funky cocktail lounge music which smoothly blends into the woodwork."

== Track listing ==
| No. | Title | Writer(s) | Length |
|---|---|---|---|
| 1. | "Whisper Zone" | Al McKay, Jon Lind, Larry Dunn | 3:00 |
| 2. | "High Point" | Al McKay, Larry Dunn | 3:48 |
| 3. | "Tondelayo" | Larry Dunn, Lenny White | 4:52 |
| 4. | "Caribbean Blue" | Larry Dunn | 4:14 |
| 5. | "Looking Glass" | Ramsey Lewis | 3:33 |
| 6. | "Come Back Jack" | Terry Marie Poret | 3:36 |
| 7. | "Colors In Space" | Larry Dunn, Maurice White | 2:57 |
| 8. | "Crystals 'N Sequence" | Allen Toussaint | 2:39 |
| 9. | "You Are The Reason" | James L. Mack | 4:56 |
| 10. | "Hell On Wheels" | Allen Toussaint | 4:08 |

== Personnel ==
- Guitar – Al McKay, Leo Nocentelli, Roland Bautista
- Bass: David Barard, Keni Burke, Byron Miller
- Keyboards: – Larry Dunn, Sam Henry Jr., Ramsey Lewis
- Drums: Herman "Roscoe" Ernest III, James Gadson, Ndugu Chancler
- Percussion: Fred White, Kenneth "Afro" Williams, Paulinho Da Costa, Phillip Bailey
- Horns: Michael Davis, Rahm Lee, Louis Satterfield
- Saxophone – Donald Myrick
- Vocals – Jon Lind, Warren Weinberg, Maurice White

== Charts ==
| Chart (1980) | Peak position |
|---|---|
| US Jazz Albums (Billboard) | 7 |
| US Top Soul Albums (Billboard) | 52 |
