= The Journey (Bobby Lyle album) =

Studio album by Bobby Lyle
- Released: July 31, 1990
- Studio: Ocean Way Recording, Crystal Studios and Wide Tracks (Hollywood, California); Record One (Los Angeles, California)
- Genre: Jazz; R&B
- Length: 53:31
- Label: Atlantic
- Producer: Bobby Lyle

Bobby Lyle chronology
Ivory Dreams (1989)	The Journey (1990)	Pianomagic (1981)

The Journey is a studio album by jazz keyboardist Bobby Lyle, released in 1990 on Atlantic Records. The album peaked at No. 1 on the US Billboard Top Contemporary Jazz Albums chart.

== Critical reception ==
Professional ratings
Review scores
Source	Rating
AllMusic	4/5 stars

Scott Yanow of AllMusic, in a 4/5 star review, wrote "During practically every piece, Lyle spends part of the time seemingly attempting to overcome his surroundings. If he would drop the heavy baggage (especially the strings, the unnecessary singers and the dull drumming), Lyle could create some significant jazz. As it is, The Journey is much better than expected and fairly enjoyable."

== Track listing ==
No.	Title	Writer(s)	Length
1.	"Struttin'"	Bobby Lyle	05:48
2.	"Reach Out for Love"	Phillip Ingram/Bobby Lyle	04:54
3.	"Love Eyes"	Bobby Lyle	05:29
4.	"Othello"	Bobby Lyle	06:52
5.	"Fly Away Spirit"	Bobby Lyle	02:53
6.	"Viva Mandela/The Journey"	Bobby Lyle/Kyphus Semeya	05:57
7.	"Sassy"	Bobby Lyle	06:30
8.	"Swing Jack"	Bobby Lyle	06:08
9.	"Blues for Dexter"	Bobby Lyle	04:55
10.	"It Never Entered My Mind"	Lorenz Hart/Richard Rodgers	04:05

== Personnel ==
- Bobby Lyle – keyboards (1–4, 6–8), string arrangements and conductor (1, 3), acoustic piano solo (5, 10), drum programming (6), acoustic piano (9)
- Ray Fuller – guitars (1)
- Paul Jackson Jr. – guitars (2, 7, 8)
- Freddie Washington – bass (1)
- John Patitucci – bass (3, 8)
- Larry Kimpel – bass (4)
- Gerald Veasley – bass intro solo (4)
- Gerald Albright – bass (6, 7)
- Andrew Simpkins – bass (9)
- Donnell Spencer – drums (1)
- Michael Baker – drum programming (2), drums (3, 4, 7–9)
- Leon "Ndugu" Chancler – drum fills (2, 6)
- Paulinho da Costa – percussion (1, 3, 7)
- Bill Summers – percussion (6)
- Kirk Whalum – soprano saxophone (3, 7), tenor saxophone (8)
- Kenny Flood – soprano saxophone (4)
- Stanley Turrentine – tenor saxophone (9)
- Phillip Ingram – lead vocals (2), backing vocals (2)
- Maxi Anderson – backing vocals (2)
- Lynn Davis – backing vocals (2)
- Jim Gilstrap – vocals (6)
- Darryl Phinnessee – vocals (6)
- Kyphus Semeya – vocals (6)
- Carmen Twillie – vocals (6)
- Julia Tillman Waters – vocals (6)
- Maxine Waters Willard – vocals (6)
- Oren Waters – vocals (6)

== Production ==
- Bobby Lyle – producer, arrangements
- Michael C. Ross – recording, mixing
- Allen Sides – recording, mixing
- Andrew Berliner – additional engineer
- Steve MacMillan – additional engineer
- Joe Schiff – additional engineer
- Steve Batte – assistant engineer
- Mark Guilbeault – assistant engineer
- Clif Norrell – assistant engineer
- Rail Rogut – assistant engineer
- Eric Rudd – assistant engineer
- Bernie Grundman – mastering at Bernie Grundman Mastering (Hollywood, California)
- Bob Defrin – art direction
- David Roth – photography
- Farah Bajull – wardrobe stylist
- Katherine Williams – hair stylist
- I.D. Management – management
