= Classic Masters (Ronnie Laws album) =

Studio album by Ronnie Laws
- Released: 1984
- Genre: Jazz
- Label: Capitol Records
- Producer: Ronnie Laws, Wayne Henderson, Leon Johnson, Greg Mathieson

Ronnie Laws chronology
Mr. Nice Guy (1983)	Classic Masters (1984)	Mirror Town (1986)

Professional ratings
Review scores
Source	Rating
AllMusic	2.5/5 stars

Classic Masters is the eight studio album by American saxophonist Ronnie Laws, released in 1984 by Capitol Records. The album reached No. 16 on the Billboard Traditional Jazz Albums chart and No. 33 on the Billboard Top Soul Albums chart.

== Background ==
Artists such as Brad Buxer and Roland Bautista of Earth, Wind & Fire appear on the album.

== Singles ==
"City Girl" reached No. 31 on the Billboard Hot Black Singles chart.

== Track listing ==
No.	Title	Writer(s)	Length
1.	"City Girl"	Ronnie Laws	3:44
2.	"Always There"	Ronnie Laws, William Jeffery	4:52
3.	"Love Is Here"	Ronnie Laws	4:53
4.	"Every Generation"	Ronnie Laws	5:52
5.	"(You Are) Paradise"	S. Borden, Leon Johnson, Ronnie Laws	4:05
6.	"Friends and Strangers"	William Jeffery	5:52
7.	"In The Groove"	Greg Mathieson, Trevor Veitch	3:33
8.	"Stay Awake"	Ronnie Laws	4:09
9.	"Saturday Evening"	Ronnie Laws	4:33
