= Rhapsody and Blues =

Studio album by The Crusaders
- Released: March 1980
- Studio: Britannia Studios (Hollywood, California)
- Genre: Jazz
- Length: 39:09
- Label: Columbia
- Producer: Joe Sample; Stix Hooper; Wilton Felder

The Crusaders chronology
Street Life (1979)	Rhapsody and Blues (1980)	Standing Tall (1981)

Rhapsody and Blues is an album by jazz fusion group The Crusaders, produced by Stix Hooper, Joe Sample and Wilton Felder, and released in 1980 via MCA Records. That album peaked at No. 2 on the US Billboard Top Jazz LPs chart.

== Guest performances ==
Guest artists on the album included Bill Withers, Sheila E. and Roland Bautista of Earth, Wind and Fire.

== Critical reception ==
Professional ratings
Review scores
Source	Rating
AllMusic	2/5 stars

Scott Yanow of AllMusic, in a 2/5-star review, remarked, "the group's concept was starting to sound a bit tired..(with) the group's R&Bish music sounding closer to a formula."

== Track listing ==
No.	Title	Writer(s)	Length
1.	"Soul Shadows"	Will Jennings, Joe Sample	8:16
2.	"Honky Tonk Struttin'"	Wilton Felder	4:26
3.	"Elegant Evening"	Stix Hooper	6:03
4.	"Rhapsody and Blues"	Joe Sample	8:48
5.	"Last Call"	Joe Sample	6:40
6.	"Sweet Gentle Love"	Joe Sample	4:56

== Personnel ==
The Crusaders

- Joe Sample – acoustic and electric keyboards, synthesizer arrangements
- Wilton Felder – alto saxophone, soprano saxophone, tenor saxophone, bass (2, 5)
- Stix Hooper – drums, percussion

Guest musicians

- Rory Kaplan – synthesizer programming
- Roland Bautista – guitars
- Bob Mann – guitars
- Dean Parks – guitars
- Phil Upchurch – guitars
- Abraham Laboriel – bass solo (1)
- Alphonso Johnson – bass (6)
- Paulinho da Costa – percussion (1, 5)
- Sheila E. – percussion (2, 4–6)
- Ralf Rickert – trumpet (1)
- Bill Withers – vocals (1)

== Production ==
- Wilton Felder – producer
- Stix Hooper – producer
- Joe Sample – producer
- Greg Venable – engineer, mixing
- Russell Bracher – assistant engineer
- Bernie Grundman – mastering at A&M Studios (Hollywood, California)
- Tom Hooper – executive assistant
- Pamela Hope Lobue – production coordinator
- George Osaki – art direction
- Andy Engel – illustration
- Ron Larson – illustration
- Richard Arrindell – photography
