= Flame (Ronnie Laws album) =

Studio album by Ronnie Laws
- Released: September 1978
- Studio: Indigo Ranch
- Genre: Jazz
- Length: 39:06
- Label: United Artists
- Producer: Ronnie Laws

Ronnie Laws chronology
Friends & Strangers (1977)	Flame (1978)	Every Generation (1980)

Flame is the fourth studio album by American saxophonist Ronnie Laws, released in September 1978 by United Artists Records. The album reached No. 16 on the Billboard Top Soul Albums chart.

== Overview ==
Flame was executively produced by Wayne Henderson.

== Critical reception ==
Professional ratings
Review scores
Source	Rating
AllMusic	2.5/5 stars

Dennis Hunt of the Los Angeles Times wrote that Laws "seems to be drifting down that MOR/jazz path that Chuck Mangione is forging."

== Tracklist ==
All tracks are written by Ronnie Laws, except where noted.

No.	Title	Writer(s)	Length
1.	"All for You"	Larry Dunn; Ronnie Laws	3:04
2.	"These Days"	Larry Dunn, Ronnie Laws	4:35
3.	"Flame"		7:06
4.	"Living Love"	Larry Dunn, Louise Hardy	4:12
5.	"Love Is Here"		4:53
6.	"Grace"		6:02
7.	"Joy"		5:34
8.	"Live Your Life Away"		3:40

== Covers ==
Sylvia St. James recorded a vocal version of "Grace", with lyrics written by Roxanne Seeman, on her 1981 studio album Echoes & Images.

Yves Tumor samples the Sylvia St. James version of "Grace", in his 2018 single Noid.
