= Every Generation =

Studio album by Ronnie Laws
- Released: 1980
- Genre: Jazz
- Label: United Artists
- Producer: Ronnie Laws

Ronnie Laws chronology
Flame (1978)	Every Generation (1980)	Solid Ground (1981)

Professional ratings
Review scores
Source	Rating
AllMusic	2.5/5 stars

Every Generation is the fifth studio album by American saxophonist Ronnie Laws released in 1980 by United Artists Records. The album reached No. 4 on the Billboard Top Soul Albums chart.

== Singles ==
The album's title track reached No. 12 on the Billboard Hot Soul Songs chart.

== Tracklisting ==
No.	Title	Length
1.	"Young Child"	4:38
2.	"Never Get Back to Houston"	3:03
3.	"Every Generation"	5:49
4.	"Tomorrow"	3:45
5.	"O.T.B.A. Law (Outta Be a Law)"	4:42
6.	"Love's Victory"	4:25
7.	"Thoughts & Memories"	4:21
8.	"As One"	4:08

== Personnel ==
- Roland Bautista - Electric Guitar
- Pat Kelly - Electric Guitar
- Ronnie Foster - Keyboards, Synthesizers
- Larry Dunn - Keyboards, Synthesizer
- Bobby Lyle - Keyboards, Synthesizers
- Joe Sample - Piano, Electric Piano
- Ndugu Leon Chancellor - Drums, Percussion
- Nat Phillips - Electric Bass
- Hubert Laws - Flute
- Paulinho Da Costa - Percussion
- Miki Howard - Backing Vocals
- Ronnie Laws - Sax, Vocals
