= Les Fleurs (album) =

Studio album by Ramsey Lewis
- Released: 1983
- Studio: CBS Recording Studios, New York, NY PS Studios, Chicago, IL
- Genre: Jazz
- Length: 43:57
- Label: Columbia
- Producer: George Butler (Exec.), Ramsey Lewis

Ramsey Lewis chronology
Chance Encounter (1982)	Les Fleurs (1983)	The Two of Us (1984)

Les Fleurs is a studio album by American jazz pianist Ramsey Lewis released in 1983 on Columbia Records. The album peaked at No. 10 on the Billboard Jazz Albums chart and No. 32 on the Billboard Traditional Jazz Albums chart.

== Covers ==
Lewis covered Stevie Wonder's "Superwoman (Where Were You When I Needed You)", "A House Is Not a Home" by Brook Benton, Prelude, Op. 28, No. 4 (Chopin) as "Essence of Love", Olivia Newton-John's "Physical", the title track sung by Minnie Riperton (in a 1969 re-recording of the title song, originally debuted by Ramsey on his 1968 album "Maiden Voyage"), and "Reasons" by Earth, Wind & Fire on the album.

== Track listing ==
Track listing for Les Fleurs
No.	Title	Writer(s)	Length
1.	"Superwoman (Where Were You When I Needed You)"	Stevie Wonder	07:05
2.	"A House Is Not a Home"	Burt Bacharach, Hal David	06:09
3.	"Essence of Love"	Frédéric Chopin	08:14
4.	"Les Fleurs"	Charles Stepney	06:52
5.	"Physical"	Steve Kipner, Terry Shaddick	06:16
6.	"With a Gentle Touch"		04:30
7.	"Reasons"	Philip Bailey, Charles Stepney, Maurice White	04:51
