= New Warrior =

Studio album by Bobby Lyle
- Released: 1978
- Genre: Jazz, R&B
- Length: 38:29
- Label: Capitol
- Producer: Wayne Henderson

Bobby Lyle chronology
Genie (1977)	New Warrior (1978)	Night Fire (1979)

New Warrior is a studio album by jazz keyboardist Bobby Lyle, released in 1978 on Capitol Records. The album peaked at No. 27 on the US Billboard Top Jazz Albums chart.

== Critical reception ==
Professional ratings
Review scores
Source	Rating
AllMusic	4.5/5 stars

New Warrior earned a 4.5/5-star rating from AllMusic.

== Track listing ==
No.	Title	Writer(s)	Length
1.	"Good Inside"	Bobby Lyle	4:34
2.	"New Warrior"	Bobby Lyle	5:00
3.	"Believe"	Bobby Lyle	5:54
4.	"Interlude"	Bobby Lyle	1:01
5.	"Apocalypse"	Bobby Lyle	3:15
6.	"Groove (Ain't No Doubt About It)"	Bobby Lyle, Harvey Mason, Wayne Henderson	4:29
7.	"Inner Space"	Bobby Lyle	2:40
8.	"Star Traveller"	Bobby Lyle	5:34
9.	"Missing Your Love"	Bobby Lyle	6:06
10.	"What Is This Thing Called Love?"	Cole Porter	3:48
