= Daydreaming (Morris Day album) =

Studio album by Morris Day
- Released: 1987
- Recorded: 1987
- Genre: R&B/Funk
- Length: 49:33
- Label: Warner Bros.
- Producer: Morris Day, Jimmy Jam and Terry Lewis

Morris Day chronology
Color of Success (1985)	Daydreaming (1987)	Guaranteed (1992)

Singles from Daydreaming
- 1. "Fishnet" Released: 1988; 2. "Daydreaming" Released: 1988; 3. "Love Is A Game" Released: 1988; 4. "Are You Ready" Released: 1989

Professional ratings
Review scores
Source	Rating
Allmusic	3/5 stars

Daydreaming is the second album by American R&B/pop singer Morris Day, released in 1987 on Warner Bros. Records. It is the follow-up to Day's debut album, Color of Success, featured are two collaborations with Day's former band, The Time minus Monte Moir. One of these was the hit "Fishnet", which was produced with Time members Jimmy Jam and Terry Lewis.

== Reception ==
Spin called the songs, "musical Chinese food without the fortune cookie. As soon as they're finished, you don't remember if you heard 'em or not."

== Track listing ==
No.	Title	Writer(s)	Producer(s)	Length
1.	"Daydreaming"	Morris Day; Judith Day	Morris Day	5:42
2.	"Yo Love"	Morris Day; Judith Day; Ricky "Freeze" Smith	Morris Day	4:10
3.	"Fishnet"	Morris Day; James Harris III; Terry Lewis	Jimmy Jam; Terry Lewis	6:04
4.	"A Man's Pride"	Morris Day; Judith Day	Morris Day	7:48
5.	"Standing On the Line"	Morris Day; Judith Day	Morris Day	4:02
6.	"Are You Ready"	Morris Day; Judith Day	Morris Day	4:42
7.	"Love Is a Game"	Morris Day; James Harris III; Terry Lewis	Jimmy Jam; Terry Lewis	6:27
8.	"Moonlite (Passionlite)"	Morris Day; Judith Day	Morris Day	5:40
9.	"Sally"	Morris Day; Judith Day	Morris Day	4:56

== Personnel ==
- Morris Day - Lead and Backing Vocals, Keyboards, Percussion
- Judith Day - Keyboards, Backing Vocals
- Freeze - Keyboards, Bass, Synthesizer
- Gregg Arrequin - Guitar
- Roman Johnson - Keyboards
- James Oppenheim (Boney James) - Percussion, saxophone on "Are You Ready"
- Stephen Mitchell - Synthesizer
- Alfie Silas, Maxavne Moriguchi, Sharon Robinson, Yolande Fischer - Backing Vocals

Jimmy Jam and Terry Lewis Produced tracks

- Morris Day - Lead and Backing Vocals, Drums
- Jimmy Jam - Keyboards, Backing Vocals
- Terry Lewis - Bass, Backing Vocals
- Jellybean Johnson - Backing Vocals
- Jesse Johnson - Guitar, Backing Vocals
- Jerome Benton - Backing Vocals

== Charts ==
=== Album ===
Chart (1988)	Peak position
U.S. Billboard 200	41
U.S. Billboard Hot Black Albums	7

=== Singles ===
Year	Single	Chart positions		
Year	Single	US	US R&B	US Dance
1988	"Fishnet"	23	1	12
1988	"Daydreaming"	—	28	—
1988	"Love Is A Game"	—	71	—
1989	"Are You Ready"	—	73	8
