= Bill Dickens =

American electric bass guitar player

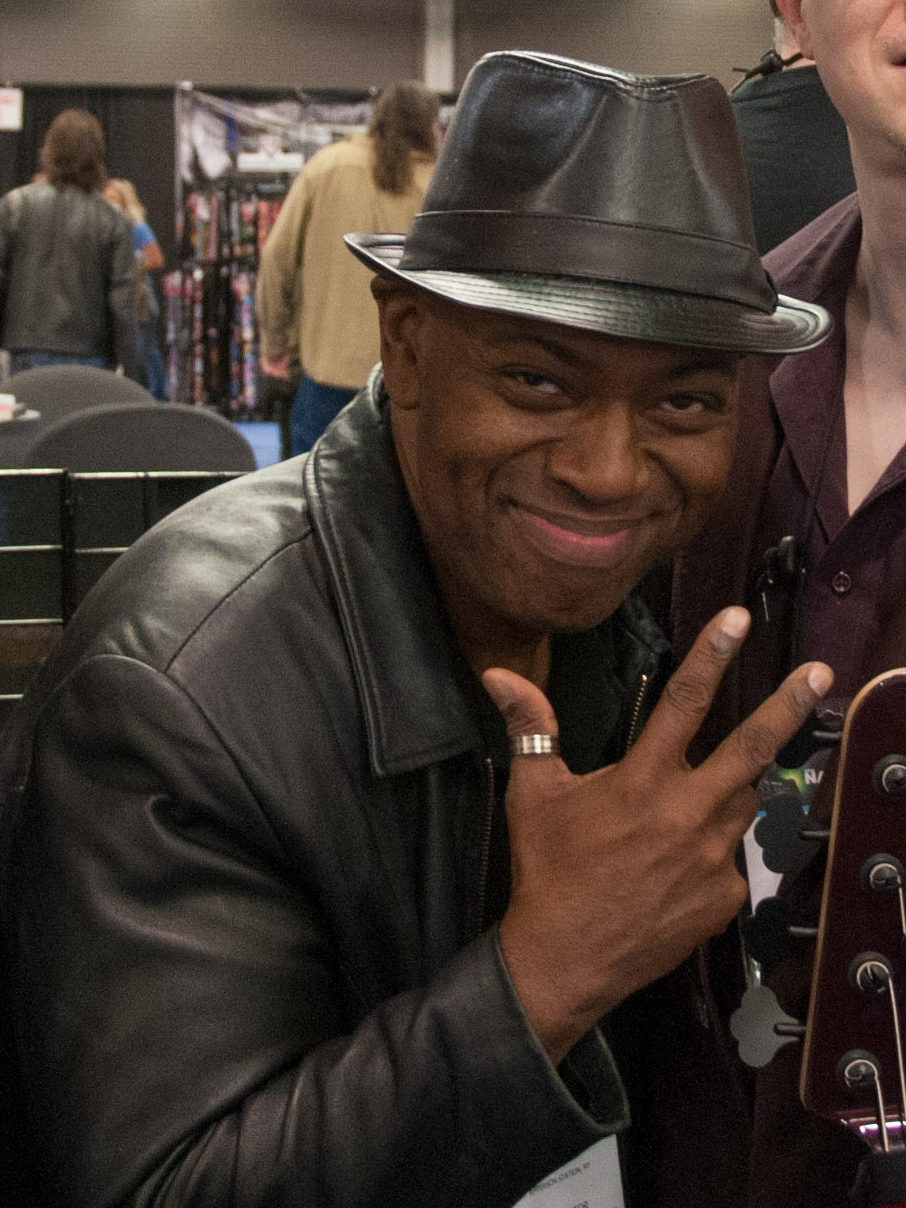
- Bill Dickens at 2014 NAMM Show

Background information
- Born: Chicago, Illinois, U.S.
- Genres: Soul, funk, fusion
- Occupations: Musician, composer, arranger, educator, songwriter
- Instrument: Bass guitar
- Years active: 1971–present
- Website: billthebuddhadickens.com

Bill "The Buddha" Dickens is an American electric bass guitar player.

Though he has recorded and performed a variety of musical styles, Dickens is best known for playing funk. He has played with Pat Metheny, George Michael, Joe Zawinul, Janet Jackson, Grover Washington, Jr., Chaka Khan, Mary J. Blige, Freddie Hubbard, Al Di Meola, Dennis Chambers, Steve Morse, Randy Newman and The Hooters.

From 1983 to 1999 he played on three recording sessions with Ramsey Lewis: Les Fleurs, A Classic Encounter, and Urban Renewal.

He performed with Victor Wooten, Steve Bailey, and Oteil Burbridge on the concert "The Day The Bass Players Took Over The World".

Dickens often performs with extended-range basses.

== Books ==
- Bass Beyond Limits: Advanced Solo and Groove Concepts, Alfred Publishing Co., Inc., 1998, ISBN 0-7692-6493-X
- Funk Bass and Beyond, Alfred Publishing Co., Inc., 2003, ISBN 0-7579-1689-9

== Videos ==
- The Bill Dickens Collection (DVD), Warner Bros. Publications, 2003
