= Portrait of Frédéric Chopin and George Sand =

1838 unfinished painting by Eugène Delacroix

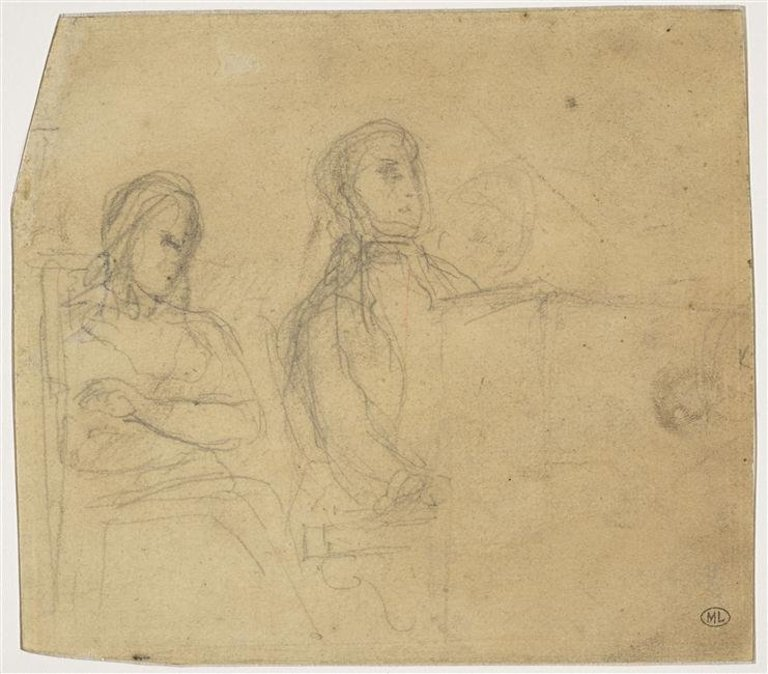
Delacroix's preliminary sketch (before 1838), now at the Louvre, for the joint portrait. George Sand (left) sews while Chopin plays piano.

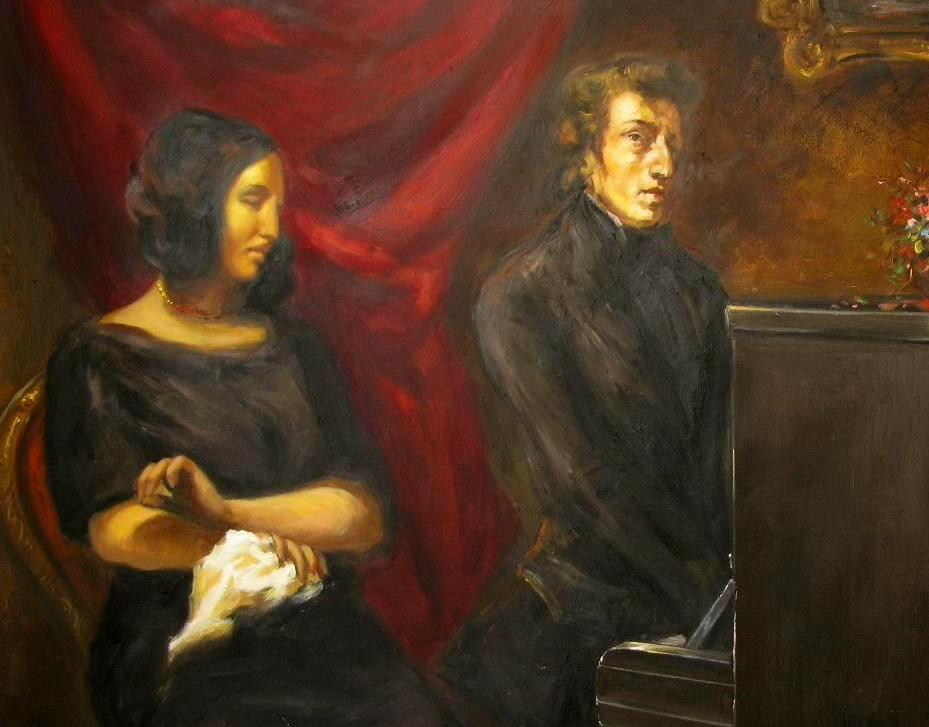
Modern and hypothetical reconstruction of the painting by an unknown artist.

The Portrait of Frédéric Chopin and George Sand was an 1838 unfinished oil-on-canvas painting by French artist Eugène Delacroix. He made a number of preparatory sketches before 1838, a more detailed one of Chopin alone and another, more coarse one of the two. Later he painted it originally as a double portrait, which was later cut in two and sold off as separate pieces. It showed the Polish composer Frédéric Chopin (1810–49) playing the piano while the writer George Sand (1804–76) sits to his right, listening and sewing (a favourite activity of hers). The sitters were lovers at the time, and both were close friends of the artist.

The portrait remained in Delacroix's studio until his death. Shortly after, it was cut into two separate works, both of which are tightly focused. Chopin's portrait comprises only a headshot, while Sand's shows her upper body but is narrowly cut. This led to the loss of large areas of the original canvas. The divide is likely due to the then-owner's belief that two paintings would sell for a higher price than one. Today Chopin's portrait is housed at the Louvre in Paris, while Sand's hangs at Copenhagen's Ordrupgaard Museum.

George Sand was a French Romantic novelist, one of the first female French writers to establish an international reputation. She became known for behaviour unusual for a woman at the time, including openly conducting affairs, smoking a pipe and wearing men's clothing. Sand had been a friend of Delacroix for a number of years, though the painter did not hold her work in high regard. She met Chopin in 1836, and from 1838, she had a relationship with him for ten years, until two years before he died. Much of the composer's best work was done during those ten years. Though their relationship began as physical, Chopin's failing health (described in Sand's autobiographical "Winter in Mallorca") in time changed her role to that of caregiver.

Sand introduced Delacroix to Chopin in 1838, and the two men remained close friends until the composer's death. The double portrait showed Chopin playing the piano while Sand sat and listened. Little is known of the painting's origin or the circumstances of its execution. It is unknown whether it was a commission or intended as a gift to the composer. It is known that Delacroix borrowed a piano so that the work could be painted in his studio. The double portrait was not finished, and one of the elements that was not painted was the piano. The Sand canvas is generally seen as the more interesting because its original form was intended as a counterpoint to the Chopin portrait, not as a stand-alone work. As such, it contravenes many conventions of portraiture. It was usual in 19th-century bust-sized paintings for the subject to be largely static, but here Sand is shown reacting to the music Chopin is playing, and highly animated and energetic in her emotional response.

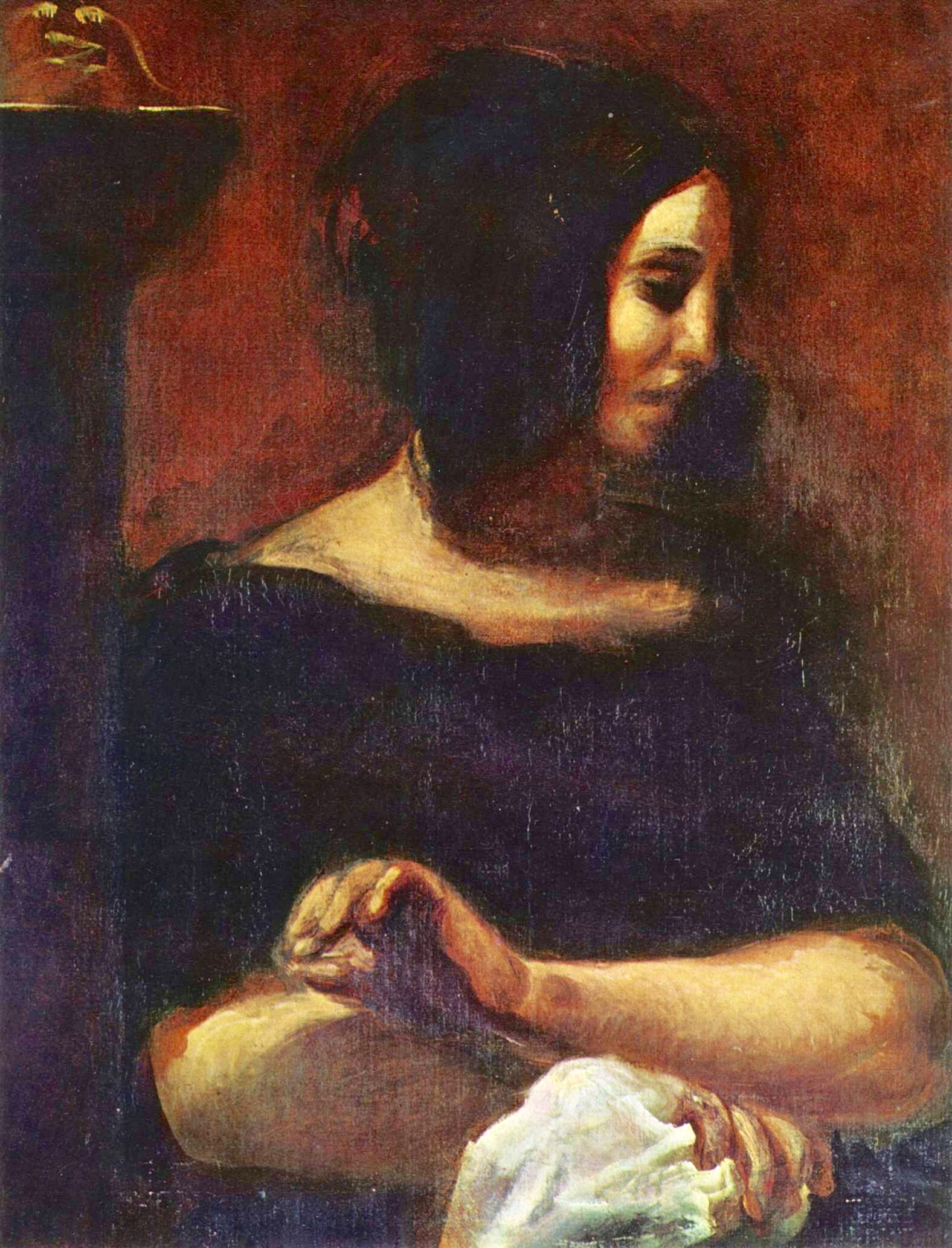
George Sand, by Delacroix. 79cm x 57cm. Ordrupgaard, Copenhagen

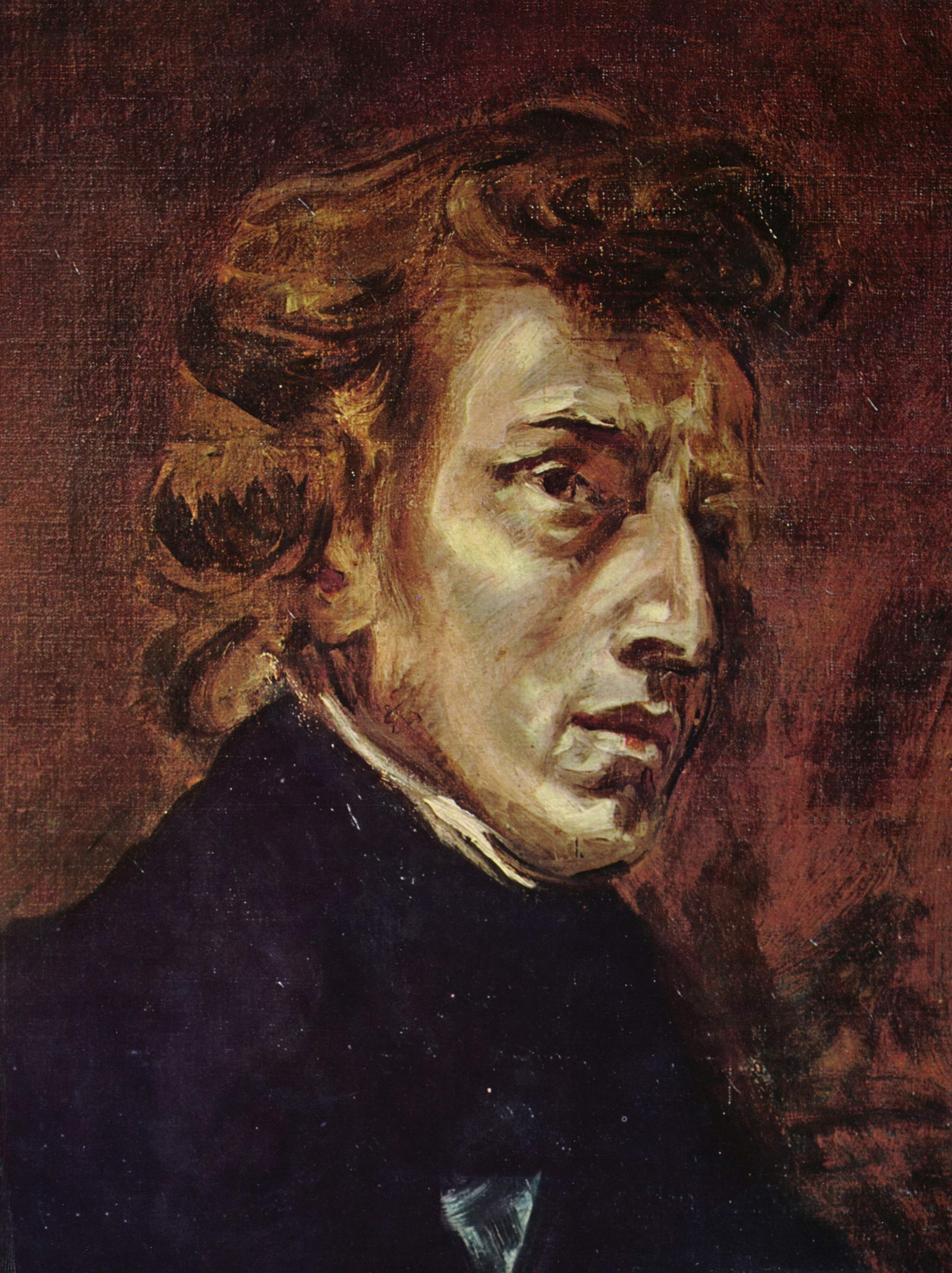
Frédéric Chopin, by Delacroix. 46cm x 38cm. Louvre, Paris
