= Pianomagic =

Studio album by Bobby Lyle
- Released: 1991
- Studios: Ocean Way Recording (Hollywood, California)
- Genres: Jazz; R&B
- Length: 47:38
- Label: Atlantic
- Producer: Bobby Lyle

Bobby Lyle chronology
The Journey (1990)	Pianomagic (1991)	Secret Island (1992)

Pianomagic is a studio album by jazz keyboardist Bobby Lyle, released in 1991 on Atlantic Records. The album peaked at No. 9 on the US Billboard Top Contemporary Jazz Albums chart.

== Critical reception ==
Professional ratings
Review scores
Source	Rating
AllMusic	4.5/5 stars

Scott Yanow of AllMusic, in a 4/5-star review, commented "Although often associated with R&B, Bobby Lyle is also a fine jazz pianist. This CD is a rare set of unaccompanied piano solos and is one of Lyle's finest recordings. At times he recalls the likes of McCoy Tyner, Ramsey Lewis and even Roger Kellaway, although his soulful style is generally quite original."

== Track listing ==
No.	Title	Writer(s)	Length
1.	"Pianomagic"	Bobby Lyle	03:34
2.	"Waltz for Debby"	Bill Evans/Gene Lees	05:03
3.	"Love Song"	Bobby Lyle	05:45
4.	"So What"	Miles Davis	04:01
5.	"The Christmas Song"	Mel Tormé/Robert Wells	03:18
6.	"Eastern Lady"	Bobby Lyle	05:13
7.	"Finger Rap"	Bobby Lyle	03:27
8.	"Blues All Day"	Bobby Lyle	04:41
9.	"The Very Thought of You"	Ray Noble	05:17
10.	"You Stepped Out of a Dream"	Nacio Herb Brown/Gus Kahn	02:44
11.	"Someday We'll All Be Free"	Donny Hathaway	04:35

== Credits ==
Performer

- Bobby Lyle – acoustic piano

Production

- Bobby Lyle – producer, arrangements
- Bob Loftus – recording, mixing
- Michael C. Ross – recording, mixing
- Allen Sides – recording, mixing
- Noel Hazen – assistant engineer
- Bernie Grundman – mastering at Bernie Grundman Mastering (Hollywood, California)
- Bob Defrin – art direction
- Thomas Bricker – design
- Brad Guice – photography
- Katherine Williams – hair stylist
- Marsha Mann – make-up
- Bernini and Prima Moda (Los Angeles) – wardrobe
- I.D. Management – management
