= Ronnie Laws =

American jazz saxophonist (Born 1950)

- Born: Ronald Wayne Laws; October 3, 1950 (age 75); Houston, Texas, U.S.
- Genres: Jazz; jazz fusion; smooth jazz; jazz funk
- Instruments: Saxophone, flute, vocals
- Years active: 1971–present
- Labels: Blue Note; Liberty; Columbia
- Formerly of: Earth, Wind & Fire

Ronald Wayne Laws (born October 3, 1950) is an American jazz and smooth jazz saxophonist, and singer. He is the younger brother of jazz flutist Hubert Laws and jazz vocalist Eloise Laws, and the older brother of Debra Laws.

== Biography ==
Born and raised in Houston, Texas, United States, Laws is the fifth of eight children. He started playing the saxophone at the age of 11.

He attended Stephen F. Austin State University in Nacogdoches, Texas, for two years.

In 1971, Laws journeyed to Los Angeles, California to embark upon a musical career. He started off by performing with trumpeter Hugh Masekela. In 1972, Laws joined the band Earth, Wind & Fire, where he played saxophone and flute on their album Last Days and Time. After 18 months working with Earth, Wind and Fire, he decided to become a solo artist. In 1975, Laws issued his debut album entitled Pressure Sensitive on Blue Note Records. The album reached No. 25 on the Billboard Top Soul Albums chart. In 1976, Laws went on to release his second LP Fever. The album reached No. 13 on the Billboard Top Soul LPs chart.

His third album, Friends & Strangers, was issued in 1977 on United Artists Records. The album has been certified gold in the US by the RIAA. Laws' fourth studio LP, entitled Flame was released in September 1978 on United Artists. The LP reached No. 16 on the Billboard Top Soul Albums chart.

His follow up album Every Generation was issued in 1980 by United Artists Records. The album reached No. 4 on the Billboard Top Soul Albums chart.

=== Work with other artists ===
Laws performed on Hubert Laws 1974 album In the Beginning and co-produced alongside him on his 1978 album Say It with Silence. He then performed on Hubert's 1979 album Land of Passion, Wayne Henderson's 1978 album Living on a Dream, the Crusaders' 1980 album Rhapsody and Blues and Debra Laws' 1981 album Very Special. He later played saxophone on Ramsey Lewis' 1983 album Les Fleurs, Sister Sledge's 1983 LP Bet Cha Say That to All the Girls, Deniece Williams' 1984 album Let's Hear It for the Boy and Jeff Lorber's 1984 LP In the Heat of the Night. Laws also performed on Alphonse Mouzon's 1985 album The Sky Is the Limit and 1988 LP Early Spring.

Laws made guest appearances on Howard Hewett's 1988 LP Forever and Ever, Norman Brown's 1992 album Just Between Us and Earth, Wind & Fire's 1993 LP Millennium. He also performed on Hubert Laws' 1993 album My Time Will Come, Rebbie Jackson's 1998 album Yours Faithfully, Kevin Toney's 2001 album Strut and the Crusaders 2006 live album Alive in South Africa. Laws later appeared on Guru's 2007 album Guru's Jazzmatazz, Vol. 4: The Hip Hop Jazz Messenger: Back to the Future and Brian Culbertson's 2007 LP Bringing Back The Funk.

== Legacy ==
Artists such as jazz saxophonist Boney James and jazz guitarist Norman Brown have been influenced by Laws.

== Discography ==
=== Albums ===
Year	Title	Peak chart positions					Record label	Certifications (sales thresholds)
Year	Title	US	US R&B	US Jazz	US Con. Jazz	US Tra. Jazz	Record label	Certifications (sales thresholds)
1975	Pressure Sensitive	73	25	—	—	—	Blue Note	
1976	Fever	46	13	—	—	—	Blue Note	
1977	Friends & Strangers	37	13	—	—	—	Blue Note	Gold: RIAA
1978	Flame	51	16	—	—	—	United Artists	
1980	Every Generation	24	4	—	—	—	United Artists	
1981	Solid Ground	51	17	—	—	—	Liberty	
1983	Mr. Nice Guy	98	24	—	—	19	Capitol	
1984	Classic Masters (compilation)	—	33	—	—	16	Capitol	
1986	Mirror Town	—	—	—	—	—	Columbia	
1987	All Day Rhythm	—	—	—	—	—	Columbia	
1989	True Spirit	—	—	—	13	—	Par Records	
1990	Identity	—	80	—	19	—	ATA Records	
1992	Deep Soul	—	—	—	6	—	Par Records	
1993	Brotherhood	—	—	—	—	—	101 South Records	
1995	Natural Laws	—	—	34	25	—	The Right Stuff/EMI	
1997	Tribute to the Legendary Eddie Harris	—	—	—	—	—	Blue Note	
1998	Harvest for the World (Portrait of the Isley Brothers)	—	—	41	—	—	Blue Note	
2000	Dream a Little	—	—	—	16	—	HDH Records	
2004	Everlasting	—	—	39	25	—	HDH Records	

=== Charted singles ===
Year	Title	Chart positions	
Year	Title	US	US R&B
1975	"Always There"	-	45
1978	"Love Is Here"	-	57
1979	"All for You"	-	93
1980	"Every Generation"	-	12
1981	"Stay Awake"	60	19
1981	"There's a Way"	-	75
1983	"In the Groove"	-	31
1983	"Mr. Nice Guy"	-	80
1985	"City Girl"	-	31
1991	"Morning in My Life"	-	76
2000	"Old Days / Old Ways"	-	36
