= Morris Day =

American singer (born 1956)

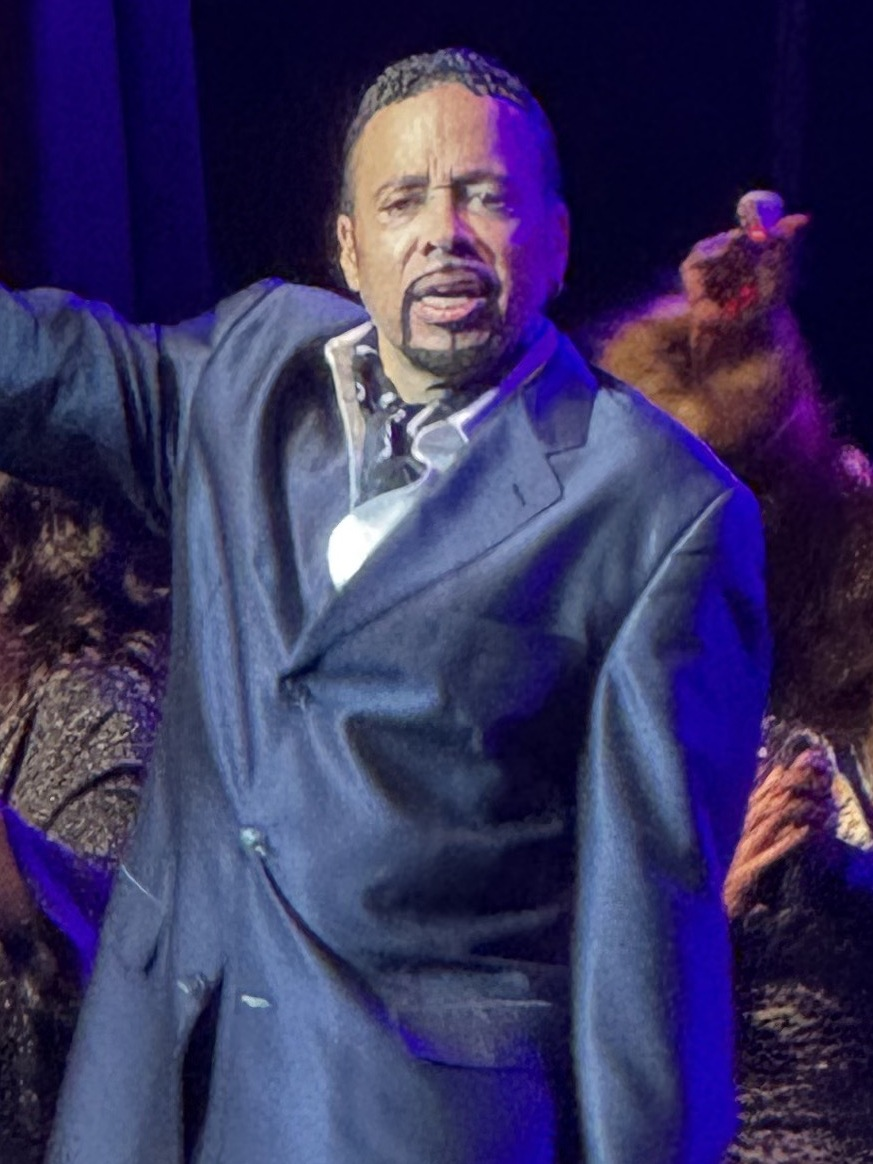
- Day in 2024

Background information
- Born: Morris Eugene Day; December 13, 1956 (age 69); Springfield, Illinois, U.S.
- Origin: Minneapolis, Minnesota, U.S.
- Genres: Minneapolis sound; funk; rock; pop; R&B; new wave; hip-hop; new jack swing
- Occupations: Singer; songwriter; bandleader; actor
- Years active: 1980−present
- Labels: Warner Bros.; Paisley Park; Reprise; Hollywood
- Member of: The Time

Morris Eugene Day (born December 13, 1956) is an American singer, songwriter, bandleader, and actor. He is best known as the lead singer of The Time.

== Music career ==
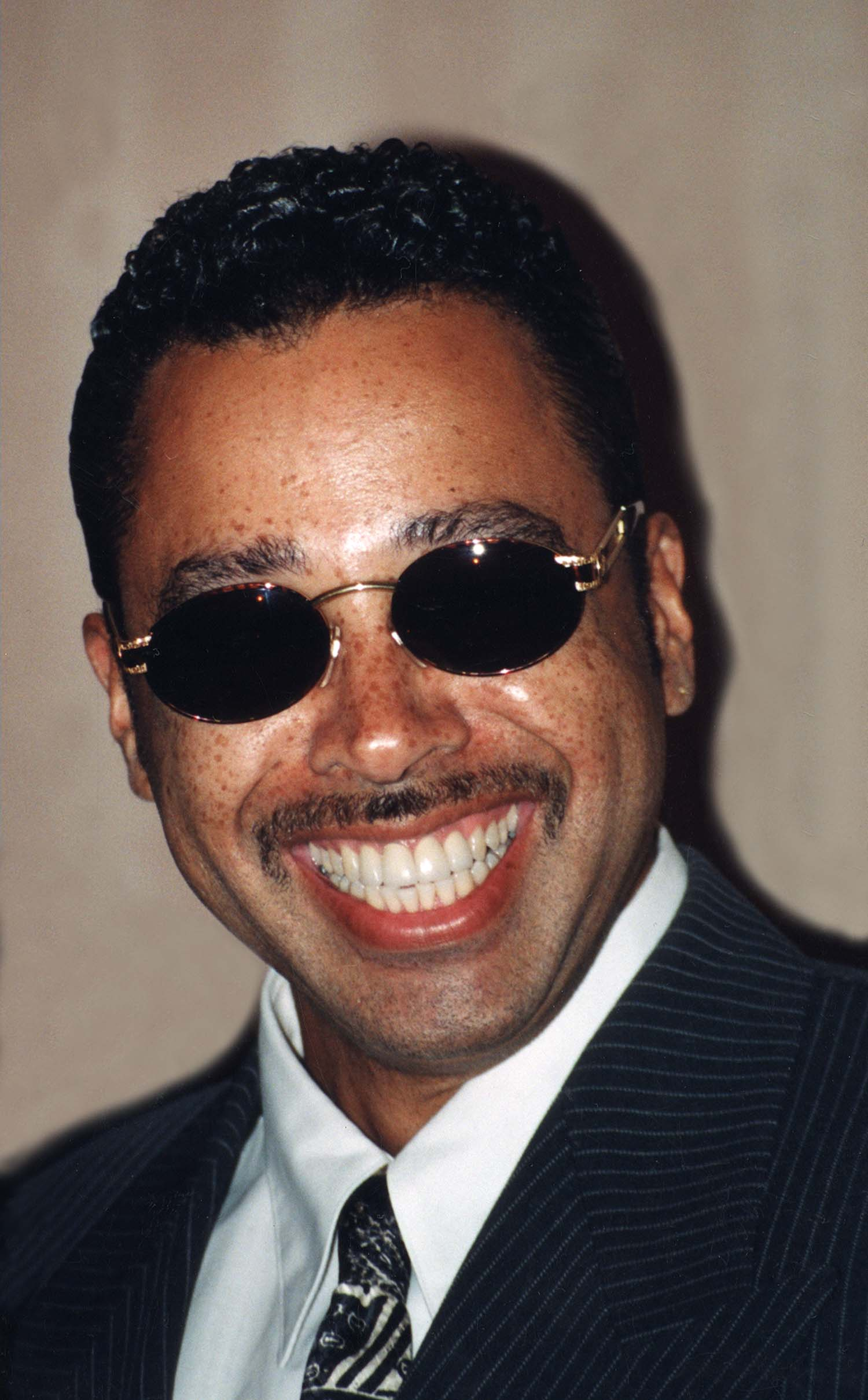
Day in 1996

Morris Day is best known as the lead singer of The Time, a group associated with Prince. Day and Prince attended the same high school in Minneapolis and in 1974, as teenagers, became bandmates in the band Grand Central. The band was managed by Morris' mother.

Morris announced in 2022 that he would be releasing his final solo album Last Call and retiring from regular touring after his 2023–2024 tour.

== Acting career ==
In addition to his roles in Purple Rain (1984) and Graffiti Bridge (1990), Day also appeared in small parts in films such as Richard Pryor's Moving (1988) and the Andrew Dice Clay film The Adventures of Ford Fairlane (1990). Day's presence on the screen decreased until, in 2001, he returned to film in Kevin Smith's Jay and Silent Bob Strike Back, performing "Jungle Love" with The Time after being introduced emphatically by Jason Mewes' character as "Morris Day and the Time!" and dancing with the movie's stars in the film's ending.

Day also appeared on the small screen in 1990 when he portrayed the character Lamarr on ABC's short-lived sitcom New Attitude. He guest-starred on the sitcom Eve as a pimp who wanted Eve's fashion boutique to design a flamboyant suit to match his witty personality, and appeared as himself in an episode on the series Moesha, attempting to file a lawsuit against Moesha's ex-boyfriend Q, who used a sample from "The Oak Tree" without permission. He also appeared in the series 227.

He appeared opposite James Avery and Matthew Stewart in a pilot called Heart & Soul produced by Quincy Jones. In 2018, Will Smith revealed that he auditioned on the spot for The Fresh Prince of Bel-Air with a script for a "failed Morris Day pilot" that Jones handed to him.

== Personal life ==
On June 4, 1986, Day married Judith Jones, a background vocalist for Lou Rawls. They had three children, Derran Day, Evan Day, and Tionna Day, and divorced in 2011.

He married Lorena Day in 2012.

== Legal dispute with Prince Estate ==
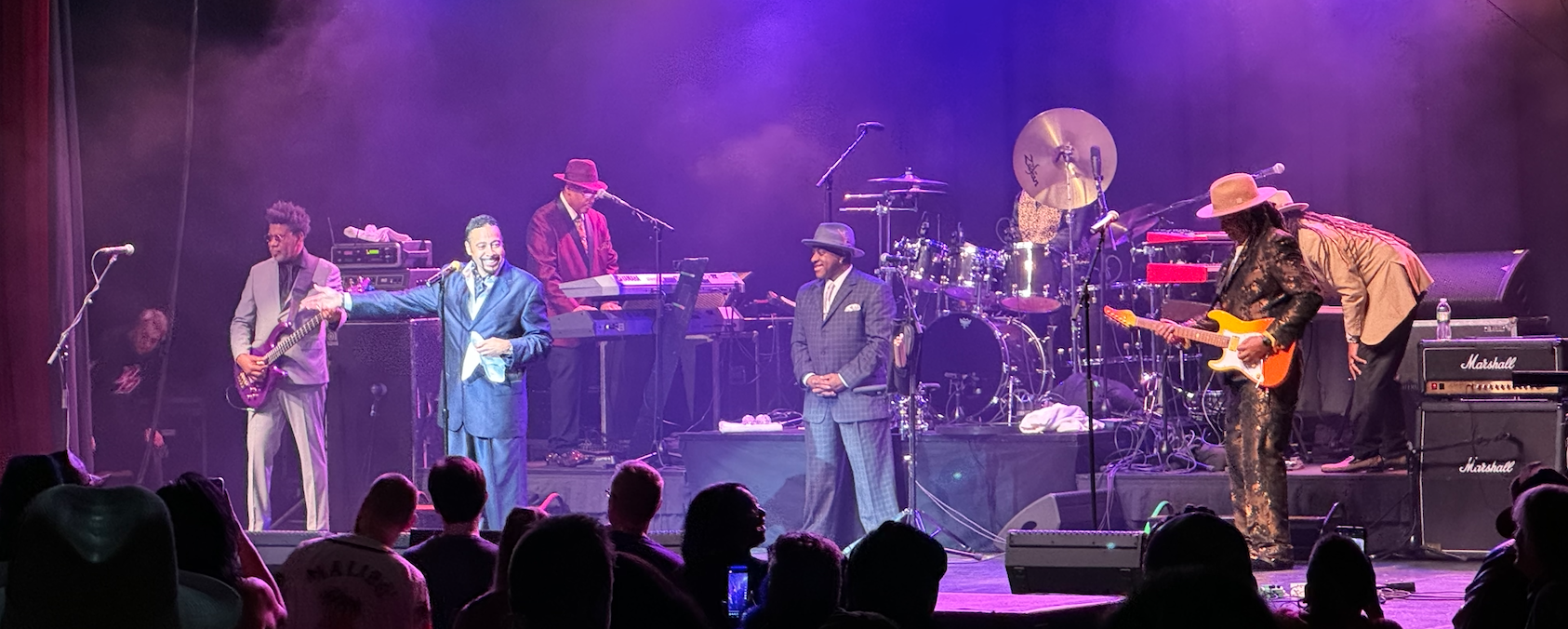
Morris Day and The Time performing in 2024

In March 2022, an article written by the Los Angeles Times mentioned that the Prince Estate recently informed Day that he "can no longer use Morris Day and the Time in any capacity." After reading the letter that was sent to Day from the estate, music industry attorney Erin M. Jacobson mentioned in that same article that it was more accurate to say the letter stated that Day could not claim “ownership of the name,” but there was still opportunity to use the name via an agreement with the Prince Estate that would provide terms for Day to monetarily compensate “the trademark owner in exchange for the ability to continue using the name.”

== Discography ==
=== Albums ===
Year	Album	Chart positions	
Year	Album	US	US R&B
1985	Color of Success	37	7
1987	Daydreaming	41	7
1992	Guaranteed	—	—
2004	It's About Time	197	38
2022	Last Call	—	—
"—" denotes releases that did not chart.

=== Singles ===
Year	Single	Chart positions			
Year	Single	US	US R&B	US Dance	UK
1985	"The Oak Tree"	65	3	14	77
1985	"The Color of Success"	—	15	—	—
1985	"The Character"	—	34	—	—
1985	"Love Sign"	—	—	—	—
1987	"Fishnet"	23	1	12	—
1988	"Love Is A Game"	—	71	—	—
1988	"Are You Ready"	—	—	8	—
1988	"Daydreaming"	—	26	—	—
1992	"Circle of Love"	—	—	—	—
1992	"Gimme Whatcha Got"	—	77	—	—
2000	"Get a Job"	—	96	—	—
2017	"Over That Rainbow"	—	—	—	—
2017	"One Night Stand" (with Snoop Dogg)	—	—	—	—
2019	"Lil Mo Funk" (with Snoop Dogg)	—	—	—	—
2020	"Cooler Than Santa Claus"	—	—	—	—
2020	"Headrush" (with Trinidad James)	—	—	—	—
2021	"Grown Man" (with Big Daddy Kane)	—	—	—	—
"—" denotes releases that did not chart or were not released in that territory.

== Filmography ==
=== Film ===
Year	Title	Role	Notes
1984	Purple Rain	Himself	
1988	Moving	Rudy	
1988	Heart and Soul	Curtis Brousseau	TV movie
1990	The Adventures of Ford Fairlane	Don Cleveland	
1990	Graffiti Bridge	Himself	
1997	A Woman Like That		
2001	Boys Klub	Marx 2	
2001	Jay and Silent Bob Strike Back	Himself	
2004	West from North Goes South	Elvis Potter	

=== Television ===
Year	Title	Role	Notes
1989	227	Prince Lionel	Episode: "The Prince"
1990	New Attitude	Lamarr	Main cast
1997	Moesha	Himself	Episode: "Rhythm and Dues"
2004	Eve	Rodney P	Episode: "Pimps Up, DivaStyle Down"
2004	Da Boom Crew	Zorch	Main cast
2007−08	Baisden After Dark	Himself/Band Leader	TV series
