= Bobby Lyle =

American jazz pianist and organist

- Born: March 11, 1944 (age 82); Memphis, Tennessee, U.S.
- Genres: Jazz, soul jazz, smooth jazz
- Occupation: Musician
- Instrument: Piano
- Years active: 1960–present
- Labels: CBS/Sony; Capitol; Atlantic; Blue Note; Heads Up
- Website: bobbylylethegenie.com

Robert Lyle (born March 11, 1944) is an American jazz pianist/organist and educator.

== Early life ==
Lyle was born in Memphis, Tennessee, on March 11, 1944, to parents Robert and Elise Lyle. He grew up in a musical household after the family moved from Memphis to Minneapolis when Lyle was age 1. He showed an early aptitude for music with his mother, a church organist, being his first piano teacher when he was aged just six years old. By junior high school he was playing clarinet and flute in the band as well as continuing piano lessons. He had already started playing jazz by ear, and by the time he attended Central High School in Minneapolis, Minnesota he came to the attention of drummer Harry Dillon who hired him to play in his trio at a private club in St. Paul, Minnesota. Lyle was 16 years old and this was his first professional gig. After graduating from Central High Lyle attended Macalester College in St. Paul where he studied piano for two years under his tutor, pianist and composer, Professor Donald Betts (1929-2021). He then left to become a full time musician. He was soon hired by ex Ramsey Lewis bandmates Redd Holt (drums) and Eldee Young (bass) to begin touring the national jazz club circuit as Young-Holt Unlimited. In 1970, aged 26, Lyle met and briefly played with Jimi Hendrix who was planning on starting a jazz-rock group with Lyle and fellow Minnesotans Willie Weeks (bass) and Bill Lordan (drums) before Hendrix's death later that year.

== Musical career ==
Lyle's first recording opportunity came about as the result of winning an International organ competition sponsored by the Yamaha Music Corporation in 1973. The album, Bobby Lyle Plays the Electone GX707 was released in 1973 and became the first piece in a long career discography. The GX707 was the forerunner of Yamaha's pared down DX7 which ushered in a new era of portable keyboard synthesizers. In 1974 Lyle with wife Delores and two young sons all moved from Minneapolis to Los Angeles, California to pursue a music career. Through a friend he was introduced to Sylvester Stewart (Sly Stone) and after a brief audition was touring with Sly and the Family Stone for the rest of the year. Following this engagement Lyle met Trombonist and co-founder of the Jazz Crusaders Wayne Henderson. Henderson was producing Ronnie Laws at the time and put the two of them together in the studio. Eventually Lyle was touring with Laws.

Henderson then took Lyle's demo to Larkin Arnold, the Vice President of A&R at Capitol Records, and secured him a record deal which resulted in three albums, the first of which was the classic The Genie in 1977. Capitol eventually dropped their jazz division. During this period in the early 1980s Lyle toured with George Benson and then became musical director for singers Phyllis Hyman, Bette Midler (with whom he received an Emmy Award nomination for musical direction after her HBO special Diva Las Vegas in 1999), Al Jarreau, and Anita Baker. In June, 1983 Lyle played keyboards with Al Jarreau at a concert held in Milan, Italy. In 1987 after a live audition for Atlantic Records Sylvia Rhone, Vice President of A&R, signed him to a deal which produced six albums in nine years (see discography). In 1990 his album The Journey reached number 1 on the Billboard Jazz Chart. Then followed three albums on independent labels: Joyful and Straight and Smooth for Three Keys, and Hands On for the Heads Up label.

== Later years and recent activity ==
In 2013 Lyle started his own label "New Warrior Music" to go with his Genie Productions company. Under this banner he produced and released a tribute to his Hammond B-3 idol Jimmy Smith called The Way I Feel. More recently he has also been working as a jazz piano instructor and practitioner of master classes in colleges and High schools. On November 8, 2020, Lyle was inducted into the Black Music Awards Hall of Fame in Houston, Texas. In 1997, Lyle was nominated for an Emmy Award for Outstanding Music Direction as Bette Midler’s Music Director, and, in 2021 for his latest single "Living in the Flow".

In March 2021 he released the album Ivory Flow which was a return to the contemporary/smooth genre he helped to pioneer. The single from the album, "Living In the Flow" was well received and played on radio.

Lyle continues to perform with his own band and also currently teaches and mentors jazz piano to students both privately as well as in clinics and seminars. Walker Elementary School in Houston has set up a "Bobby Lyle Music Scholarship Fund". Lyle encourages the pupils to write essays about why they wish to study music. From those selected, the two considered the best, being based on genuine passion for music as well as financial need, are awarded enough money to pay for a musical instrument as well as receive private instruction. The funds are generated from the sale of Lyle's CDs, which are donated by Marcus Johnson at Three Keys Music.

== Discography ==
Title	Year	Label
Bobby Lyle Plays Electone GX707	1973	CBS/Sony
The Genie	1977	Capitol
New Warrior	1978	Capitol
Night Fire	1979	Capitol
Night Breeze	1985	Evidence
Ivory Dreams	1989	Atlantic
The Journey	1990	Atlantic
Pianomagic	1991	Atlantic
Secret Island	1992	Atlantic
Best of Bobby Lyle	1993	Blue Note/Capitol
Rhythm Stories	1994	Atlantic
Power of Touch	1997	Atlantic
Joyful	2002	Three Keys
Straight and Smooth	2004	Three Keys
Hands On	2006	Heads Up
The Way I Feel	2013	New Warrior Music
Ivory Flow	2021	New Warrior Music

=== As sideman ===
With George Benson

- Good King Bad (CTI, 1975)

With Benny Golson

- Killer Joe (Columbia, 1977)

With Eddie Harris

- That Is Why You're Overweight (Atlantic, 1975)

With Pharoah Sanders and Norman Connors

- Love Will Find a Way (Arista Novus, 1978)
- Beyond a Dream (Arista Novus, 1981)

With Gábor Szabó

- Faces (Mercury, 1977)
