= Miki Howard discography =

- Studio albums: 9
- Live albums: 1
- Compilation albums: 1
- Singles: 12
- Music videos: 12
- Other albums: 1

This discography of Miki Howard documents the release of studio albums, live recording and compilation albums, well as music videos and singles.

== Albums ==
=== Studio albums ===
Year	Album details	Peak chart positions		
Year	Album details	US	US R&B	US Indie
1986	Come Share My Love: Released: November 19, 1986; Label: Atlantic; Formats: CD, LP, cassette	171	19	—
1987	Love Confessions: Released: December 1987; Label: Atlantic; Formats: CD, LP, cassette	145	13	—
1989	Miki Howard: Released: November 12, 1989; Label: Atlantic; Formats: CD, LP, cassette	112	4	—
1992	Femme Fatale: Released: September 15, 1992; Label: Giant; Formats: CD, LP, cassette	110	7	—
1993	Miki Sings Billie: Released: December 1993; Label: Giant; Formats: CD, LP, cassette	—	72	—
1997	Can't Count Me Out: Released: May 27, 1997; Label: Hush; Formas: CD, LP	—	—	—
2001	Three Wishes: Released: March 27, 2001; Label: Peak; Formats: CD, LP	—	67	25
2006	Pillow Talk: Released: September 19, 2006; Label: Shanachie; Formats: CD, LP, Digital	—	60	—
2008	Private Collection: Released: June 3, 2008; Label: Branicka; Formats: CD, Digital	—	60	—
2015	I Choose to Be Happy: Released: January 26, 2015; Label: Mato; Formats: Digital, CD	—	—	—
2022	MEHA: Released Dec 12, 2022; Label: Justice Records; Formats: Digital	_	_	_
"—" denotes items that did not chart or were not released in that territory

=== Live albums ===
Year	Album details
1996	Live Plus: Released: October 24, 1996; Label: Warlock

=== Compilation albums ===
Year	Album details
2001	The Very Best of Miki Howard: Released: July 3, 2001; Label: Atlantic, Rhino

== Singles ==
Year	Single	Peak chart positions				Album
Year	Single	US	US R&B	US A/C	UK	Album
1986	"Come Share My Love"	—	5	38	—	Come Share My Love
1987	"Imagination"	—	13	—	—	Come Share My Love
1987	"Come Back to Me Lover"	—	33	—	—	Come Share My Love
1987	"Baby, Be Mine"	—	5	—	—	Love Confessions
1988	"That's What Love Is" (Duet with Gerald Levert)	—	4	—	—	Love Confessions
1988	"Crazy"	—	38	—	—	Love Confessions
1989	"Ain't Nuthin' in the World"	—	1	—	—	Miki Howard
1989	"Love Under New Management"	—	2	—	—	Miki Howard
1990	"Until You Come Back to Me (That's What I'm Gonna Do)"	—	3	—	67	Miki Howard
1990	"Come Home to Me"	—	53	—	—	Miki Howard
1992	"Ain't Nobody Like You"	84	1	—	—	Femme Fatale
1992	"Release Me"	—	43	—	—	Femme Fatale
1993	"Shining Through	—	—	—	—	Femme Fatale
1993	"But I Love You"	—	— (Note: "But I Love You" did not enter the Hot R&B/Hip-Hop Songs, but peaked at number 112 on Bubbling Under R&B/Hip-Hop Songs.)	—	—	Femme Fatale
1997	"Something I've Never Had"	—	— (Note: "Something I've Never Had" did not enter the Hot R&B/Hip-Hop Songs, but peaked at number 105 on Bubbling Under R&B/Hip-Hop Songs.)	—	—	Can't Count Me Out
2001	"Nobody"	—	—	—	—	Three Wishes
2001	"Kiss of a Stranger"	—	—	—	—	Three Wishes
2008	"Favorite Time of the Year"	—	—	—	—	Private Collection
2014	"Panther" (feat. Too Short)	—	—	—	—	I Choose to Be Happy
2015	"He Looked Beyond My Faults"	—	—	—	—	—N/a
2019	"FED UP!"	—	—	—	—	non-album single
2022	"Throw It Away"	—	—	—	—	non-album single
"—" denotes a recording that did not chart or was not released in that territory.

== Videography ==
=== Music videos ===
Year	Title	Album
1987	"Imagination"	Come Share My Love
1987	"Baby, Be Mine"	Love Confessions
1988	"That's What Love Is" (Duet with Gerald Levert)	Love Confessions
1989	"Love Under New Management"	Miki Howard
1990	"Until You Come Back to Me (That's What I'm Gonna Do)"	Miki Howard
1992	"Ain't Nobody Like You"	Femme Fatale
1992	"Release Me"	Femme Fatale
1997	"Something I Never Had"	Can't Count Me Out
2009	"Favorite Time of The Year"	Private Collection
