= Live Plus =

Live album by Miki Howard
- Released: October 24, 1996
- Genre: R&B, Jazz, Soul
- Length: 55:37
- Label: Warlock
- Producer: LeMel Humes; Jon Nettlesbey & Terry Coffey; Gerald Levert & Marc Gordon; Nick Martinelli; Arif Mardin

Miki Howard chronology
Miki Sings Billie (1993)	Live Plus (1996)	Can't Count Me Out (1997)

Professional ratings
Review scores
Source	Rating
Allmusic	3.5/5 stars

Live Plus is a live album by American R&B singer Miki Howard, released in the United States on October 24, 1996 through Warlock Records label. Along with performing all of her hit songs, the album also features a tune written by Howard herself, called the "Blues".

== Track listing ==
No.	Title	Writer(s)	Length
1.	"Come Share My Love"	LeMel Humes	4:11
2.	"Imagination"	Johnny Burke, James Van Heusen	6:10
3.	"That's What Love Is"	Marc Gordon, Miki Howard, Gerald Levert	3:21
4.	"You've Changed"	Bill Carey, Carl T. Fischer	3:59
5.	"Baby, Be Mine"	Ashley Ingram, Jackie Rawe	11:40
6.	"Blues"	Miki Howard	5:29
7.	"Ain't Nobody Like You"	LeMel Humes	4:51
8.	"Ain't Nuthin' in the World"	Terry Coffey, Jon Nettlesbey	4:47
9.	"Love Under New Management"	Annette Hardeman, Gabriel Hardeman	7:20
10.	"Until You Come Back to Me (That's What I'm Gonna Do)"	Morris Broadnax, Clarence Paul, Stevie Wonder	3:54
