= The Very Best of Miki Howard =

Greatest hits album by Miki Howard
- Released: July 3, 2001
- Recorded: 1986, 1987, 1989, 1992, 1993
- Genre: R&B, soul, jazz
- Length: 1:18:48
- Label: Atlantic, Rhino
- Producer: LeMel Humes; Nicki Martinelli; Gerald Levert & Marc Gordon; Jon Nettlesbey & Terry Coffey; Arif Mardin; Rhett Lawrence

Miki Howard chronology
Three Wishes (2001)	The Very Best of Miki Howard (2001)	Pillow Talk (2006)

Professional ratings
Review scores
Source	Rating
Allmusic	4/5 stars

The Very Best of Miki Howard is a greatest hits compilation album by American R&B/soul singer Miki Howard. It was released in 2001 in the United States by Atlantic Records. The album features five of Howard's top five R&B singles and the number-one R&B hits, "Ain't Nuthin' in the World" and "Ain't Nobody Like You". The album also features Howard's cover of Glenn Miller's pop hit, "Imagination" and renditions of Billie Holiday's, "Don't Explain" and "Good Morning Heartache".

== Track listing ==
1. "Come Share My Love"
2. "Imagination"
3. "Love Will Find a Way"
4. "Baby, Be Mine"
5. "That's What Love Is" (Duet with Gerald Levert)
6. "Crazy"
7. "You've Changed"
8. "Come Home to Me"
9. "Ain't Nuthin' in the World"
10. "Love Under New Management"
11. "Until You Come Back to Me (That's What I'm Gonna Do)"
12. "If You Still Love Her"
13. "Ain't Nobody Like You"
14. "Good Morning Heartache"
15. "Release Me"
16. "Don't Explain"
