= Milira (album) =

Studio album by Milira
- Released: June 15, 1990
- Length: 55:21
- Label: Motown
- Producer: Donald Dee Bowden

Milira chronology
Milira (1990)	Back Again!!! (1992)

Singles from Milira
- 1. "Mercy Mercy Me (The Ecology)" Released: April 23, 1990; 2. "Waiting Here For You" Released: July 18, 1990; 3. "Go Outside in the Rain" Released: November 21, 1990

Milira is the debut studio album by American R&B singer Milira. It was released by Motown Records on June 15, 1990, in the United States. Chiefly produced by Donald Dee Bowden, the album reached number 29 on Billboard's Top R&B Albums chart and scored two top 40 R&B singles, "Go Outside in the Rain" and a cover version of Marvin Gaye's "Mercy Mercy Me (The Ecology)." The album also includes a cover of Aretha Franklin's "Until You Come Back to Me (That's What I'm Gonna Do)".

== Critical reception ==
Professional ratings
Review scores
Source	Rating
AllMusic	4.5/5 stars
Select	2/5 medals

AllMusic editor Bil Carpenter described the album as "jazz-edged urban soul."

== Track listing ==
All tracks produced by Donald Dee Bowden.

Milira track listing
No.	Title	Writer(s)	Length
1.	"Mercy Mercy Me (The Ecology)" (featuring Noel Pointer)	Marvin Gaye	4:46
2.	"Go Outside in the Rain"	Bonifacio Valasquez; Nathaniel Calhoun	5:21
3.	"Waiting Here for You"	Donald Dee Bowden; Robert Quarles	4:28
4.	"That Man in My Life"	Bowden; Milira Jones	3:35
5.	"Good Times Are Back Again"	Allan Rich; Chuck Jackson; Marvin Morrow	4:53
6.	"I Want to Be to You (What You Are to Me)" (featuring Nathaniel Calhoun)	Bowden; Calhoun	4:17
7.	"Until You Come Back to Me (That's What I'm Gonna Do)"	Morris Broadnax; Stevie Wonder; Clarence Paul	3:50
8.	"Let Me Have a Chance"	Bruce Purse	5:40
9.	"Treat Me Right" (featuring Brent Carter)	Bowden; Robert Quarles	4:59
10.	"Home"	Bowden; Quarles	4:30
11.	"That Four Letter Word"	Bowden; Nick Smith; Jones	4:13
12.	"Mercy Mercy Me (The Ecology)" (Vocal Mix)	Gaye	4:49

== Personnel ==
- Donald Dee Bowden – mixing, producer
- Harold Jackson – executive producer
- Gregg Mann – recording
- Herb Powers – mastering
- Timmy Regisford – mixing
- Noza Rivers – executive producer
- Oliver Sutton – executive producer
- Percy Sutton – executive producer
- Elai Tubo – recording

== Charts ==
Weekly chart performance for Milira
Chart (1990)	Peak position
US Top R&B/Hip-Hop Albums (Billboard)	29
