= Noid =

Noid may refer to:

== Messages ==
- a message stating a lack of identifier or identification (no ID, NOID)
- Notice of Intent to Deny (NOID), a notice provided by U.S. Immigration
- Notification of Infectious Diseases (NOID), part of the UK statutory notification system

== People and characters ==
- Václav "Noid" Bárta (born 1980), Czech singer-songwriter

=== Characters ===
- The Noid (mascot), a fictional character used by Domino's Pizza advertising
- nõid, a folkloric character in Estonian mythology
- Noids, a character class from the 1992 film Cool World
- Dr. A. Noid, a fictional character from the 1988 videogame Road Raider
- Palmer Noid, a fictional character from the TV show Ned's Declassified School Survival Guide; see List of Ned's Declassified School Survival Guide characters

== Songs ==
- "Noid" (Yves Tumor song), a 2018 song by Yves Tumor
- "Noid" (Tyler, the Creator song), a 2024 song by Tyler, the Creator from the album Chromakopia
- "Noid" (song), a 2009 song from the album Plastic Temptation
- "NOID" (song), a 2020 song by Woodz off the album EQUAL

== Other uses ==
- Noid Crew, a band, also called "Noid", founded by Václav "Noid" Bárta
- The Noids (TV series), a cancelled animated children's programming on CBS
- Noid (software, "Nice Opaque Identifier"), a program for using Archival Resource Keys
- noid (mathematics)
