= List of awards and nominations received by Billie Holiday =

This article is the list of awards and nominations received by an American jazz and swing music singer Billie Holiday.

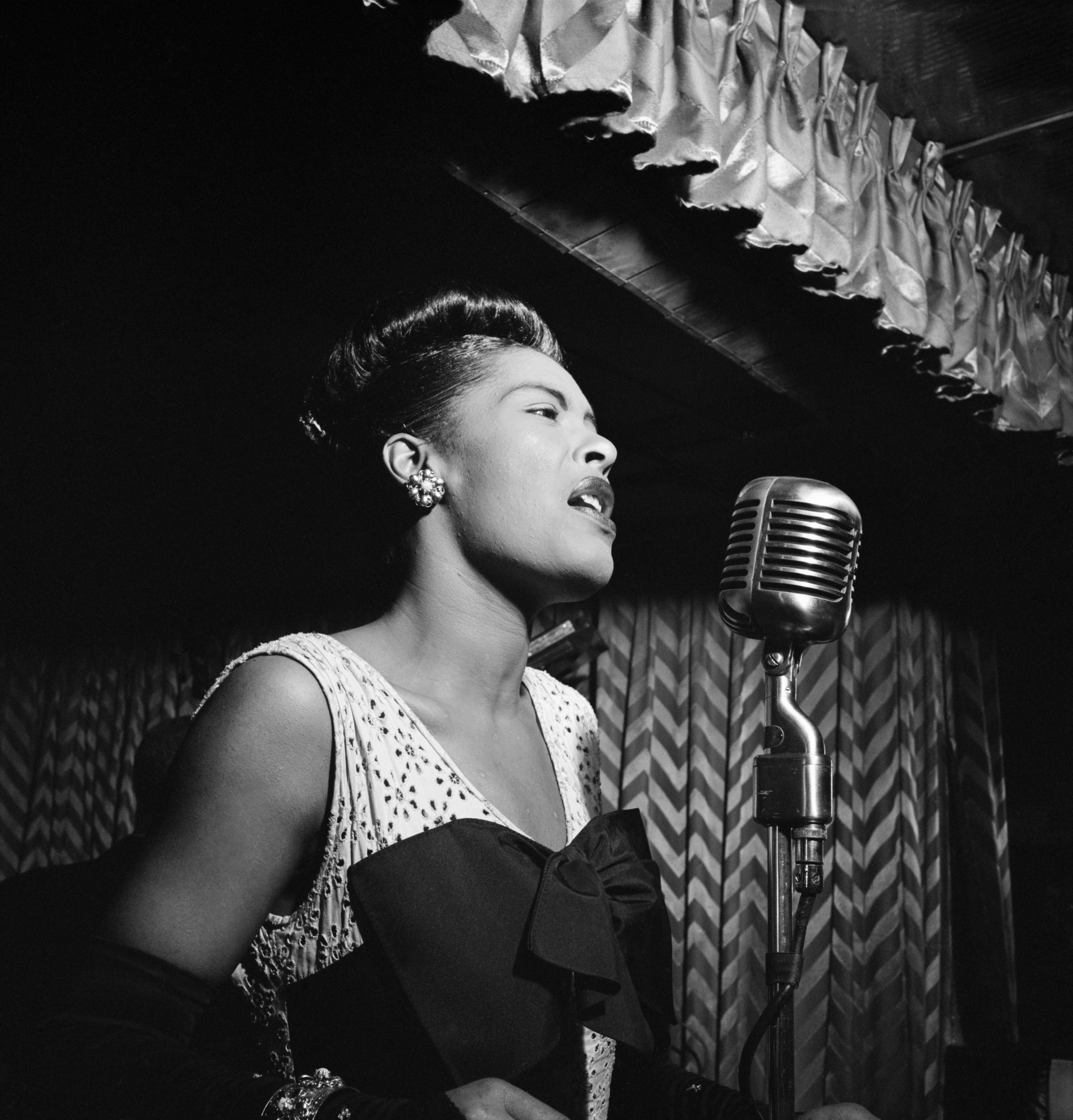
Billie Holiday in 1947

== Grammy ==
=== Hall of Fame ===
Singer Billie Holiday was posthumously inducted into the Grammy Hall of Fame, which is a special Grammy award established in 1973 to honor recordings that are at least 25 years old and that have "qualitative or historical significance."

Year Recorded	Title	Genre	Label	Year inducted	Notes
1941	"(In My) Solitude"	Jazz (single)	Okeh (Columbia)	2021	This induction ties Billie Holiday with Ella Fitzgerald for having the most entries in the Grammy Hall of Fame by a female artist
1937	"My Man"	Jazz (single)	Brunswick (Columbia)	2018	
1956	Lady Sings the Blues	Jazz (album)	Clef (Verve)	2016	
1949	"Crazy He Calls Me"	Jazz (single)	Decca	2010	
1944	"Embraceable You"	Jazz (single)	Commodore	2005	
1958	Lady in Satin	Jazz (album)	Columbia	2000	
1945	"Lover Man (Oh, Where Can You Be?)"	Jazz (single)	Decca	1989	
1939	"Strange Fruit"	Jazz (single)	Commodore	1978	Listed also in the National Recording Registry by the Library of Congress in 2002
1941	"God Bless the Child"	Jazz (single)	Okeh (Columbia)	1976	

=== Best Historical Album ===
The Grammy Award for Best Historical Album has been presented since 1979.

Year	Title	Label	Result
2002	Lady Day: The Complete Billie Holiday	Columbia 1933–1944	Winner
1994	The Complete Billie Holiday	Verve 1945–1959	Winner
1992	Billie Holiday — The Complete Decca Recordings	Verve 1944–1950	Winner
1980	Billie Holiday — Giants of Jazz	Time-Life	Winner

== Other honors ==
Year	Award	Honors	Notes
2004	Ertegun Jazz Hall of Fame	Inducted	Jazz at Lincoln Center, New York
2000	Rock and Roll Hall of Fame	Inducted	Category: "Early Influence"
1997	ASCAP Jazz Wall of Fame	Inducted	
1947	Esquire Magazine Gold Award	Best Leading Female Vocalist	Jazz award
1946	Esquire Magazine Silver Award	Best Leading Female Vocalist	Jazz award
1945	Esquire Magazine Silver Award	Best Leading Female Vocalist	Jazz award
1944	Esquire Magazine Gold Award	Best Leading Female Vocalist	Jazz award

== Tributes ==
- 1972, Diana Ross portrayed Holiday in the film Lady Sings the Blues, which is loosely based on the 1956 autobiography of the same name. The film earned Ross a nomination for the Academy Award for Best Actress.
- Singer Miki Howard released the Holiday tribute album, Miki Sings Billie: A Tribute to Billie Holiday in 1993. Miki Howard also portrayed Lady Day in a club scene in the 1992 motion picture " Malcolm X " starring Denzel Washington.
- Paula Jai Parker portrayed Holiday in a Season 7 episode of the TV series Touched by an Angel, entitled "God Bless the Child," the title derived from a song which Holiday had written and performed.
- Jazz pianist Mal Waldron performed as Holiday's accompanist and released several tribute albums including:
  - Left Alone (Bethlehem, 1959)
  - Blues for Lady Day (Black Lion, 1972)
  - Left Alone '86 with Jackie McLean (Paddle Wheel, 1986)
  - No More Tears (For Lady Day) (Timeless, 1989)
- Billie Hollidy, Croatian National Theatre in Split by A.Ostojić & Ksenia Prohaska (2006)
- Argentinean comic artists Carlos Sampayo and José Antonio Muñoz made a graphic novel on her life, titled Billie Holiday (Fantagraphics Books, 1991; Spanish edition: Ojo de Pez, Buenos Aires, 2007).
- Holiday is the primary character in the play and later the film Lady Day at Emerson's Bar and Grill; the role was originated by Reenie Upchurch in 1986 and was played by Audra McDonald on Broadway (she received a Tony Award for her performance) and in the film.

== Honors ==
- 1987, Billie Holiday was posthumously awarded the Grammy Lifetime Achievement Award.
- 1993, R&B singer Miki Howard released an album dedicated to Holiday titled Miki Sings Billie.
- 1994, the United States Postal Service introduced a Billie Holiday postage stamp.
- 1999, Holiday ranked No. 6 on VH1's 100 Greatest Women in Rock n' Roll.
- 2000, she was inducted into the Rock and Roll Hall of Fame.
- 2011, she was inducted into the National Women's Hall of Fame.

Over the years, there have been many tributes to Billie Holiday, including "The Day Lady Died", a 1959 poem by Frank O'Hara, and Langston Hughes' poem "Song for Billie Holiday".

- In 1970 Frank Sinatra recorded the song Lady Day as a tribute.
- In 1988 the group U2 released "Angel of Harlem" in her honor.
- "My Only Friend" by The Magnetic Fields is a tribute to Billie Holiday.
- Arthur Phillips features Holiday's 1953 concert in New York in his novel The Song is You (2009).
