= Helen Baylor =

American singer (born 1954)

- Also known as: Little Helen
- Born: Helen LaRue Lowe; January 8, 1954 (age 72); Tulsa, Oklahoma, U.S.
- Origin: Los Angeles, California
- Genres: Christian; Gospel; R&B; Soul
- Occupation: Singer-songwriter
- Instrument: Vocals
- Years active: 1967–present
- Labels: Word; Expansion (in the UK); Sony; Verity; Diadem; MCG

Helen LaRue Lowe (born January 8, 1954), known professionally as Helen Baylor, is an American singer-songwriter.

== Early life ==
Born Helen LaRue Lowe in Tulsa, Oklahoma, Baylor is the oldest of seven, she has five brothers and one sister. Baylor moved to Los Angeles at age eleven as her father (who was in the Army) had been transferred there. While in Los Angeles, Baylor first performed as a nightclub act.

== Career ==
Baylor opened for Aretha Franklin, Stevie Wonder, and B.B. King while still in her teens, and performed in the musical Hair. In 1967/68 she worked with producer Bobby Sanders releasing two singles, "The Richest Girl" and "What About Me Boy", as Little Helen for the Soultown label. In the 1970s she joined hit Broadway musical Hair and followed this period of her career as a session musician for artists that included Captain & Tennille, Les McCann and Rufus. As a member of Side Effect her vocals featured on their third album What You Need, from which "Always There", a song co-written by Ronnie Laws was a R&B chart success. Later in the 1980s her career would falter as a consequence of drug abuse.

Baylor became sober late in the decade, strengthening her Christian faith and deciding to focus her career on gospel music. She released her first gospel recording on Word Records in 1990 titled Highly Recommended and her first five albums all hit the Top Ten of the U.S. Billboard Top Gospel Albums chart, with the most successful being 1994's The Live Experience, which reached No. 1 on that chart. The track "Oasis" was very successful in the UK, via Expansion Records and stayed on the Music Week Dance Chart for 14 weeks. Also, the song "Sold Out" (from the album Start All Over) won a Dove Award for Contemporary Gospel Recorded Song of the Year at the 25th GMA Dove Awards in 1994. In July 2011, Baylor announced that she was co-producing a feature film about her life story. The film, A Praying Grandmother: The Helen Baylor Story, features accounts that she first shared in the song, "Helen's Testimony" (Word, 1995) and in her autobiography, No Greater Love: The Helen Baylor Story. Baylor approached award-winning filmmaker Cassandra Hollis to co-produce and direct the film. Baylor was inducted into the Oklahoma Jazz Hall of Fame in 2000.

== Personal ==
In August 1970, at age sixteen, Baylor had her first child. Baylor battled with substance abuse; using marijuana and pain pills. Before going on tour with Chaka Khan, Baylor began dating the lighting director James Baylor, who was also a drug dealer in 1979. Shortly thereafter, they moved in together. Baylor became a born-again Christian and quit doing drugs. In February 1982, she married Baylor. In 2000, they were contemplating separating but reconciled. However, in 2012, Baylor and her husband separated.

== Discography ==
- Highly Recommended (Word Records, 1990)
- Look a Little Closer (Word, 1991)
- Start All Over (Word, 1993)
- The Live Experience (Word, 1995)
- Love Brought Me Back (Sony Records, 1996)
- Helen Baylor...Live (Verity Records, 1999)
- My Everything (Diadem Records, 2002)
- Full Circle (MCG, 2006)
