= Sylvia St. James =

American singer

- Born: Sylvia St. James; Waukegan, Illinois, U.S.
- Genres: Gospel, contemporary gospel, Jazz Fusion
- Occupations: musician; choir director; singer; songwriter; producer
- Instrument: Vocals
- Years active: 1970–present
- Label: Elektra
- Formerly of: Side Effect
- Website: sylviastjamesmusic.com

Sylvia St. James is an American gospel and soul singer, recording artist, and entertainment host. She is best known for her time as the Mistress of Ceremonies of the House of Blues Sunday Gospel Brunch, and her appearances in her signature long, white embroidered dress with a wide, feathered hat.

St. James has performed solo and as a leader of the St. James Gospel Choir on the television show The Ellen DeGeneres Show among others and with artists including Andrea Bocelli, Michael Bublé, Stevie Wonder, Harry Connick Jr., Connie Stevens, Sammy Davis Jr., Carol Channing, Eddy Arnold, and Barbra Streisand.

== Early life and education ==
Born in Waukegan, Illinois, St. James was introduced to music at a young age. She learned to sing gospel music from her mother, who was the church pianist and first soprano vocalist in the choir. Her grandparents, who also sang in the church choir, allowed her to join them during services.

At the age of 15, St. James was offered a scholarship to study opera at The Chicago Conservatory of Music but before she could accept the scholarship, her family had to relocate. St. James continued performing in jazz fusion groups throughout the Midwest.

== Career ==
=== 1970s: Side Effect ===
St. James moved to California, where she lived in an Ashram for a year and a half. She was hired by the Mike Curb Congregation which led to recording sessions with artists including George Duke, Stanley Clarke, Willie Bobo, Frank Zappa, Connie Francis, The Pointer Sisters, Ronnie Laws, and Wayne Henderson.

St. James joined the band Side Effect as lead singer. Under an agreement with Fantasy Records, the band recorded the albums, "Goin' Bananas" (1977) and "Rainbow Visions" (1978), both produced by Wayne Henderson. For the 'Goin Bananas' album cover, St. James dressed in a Carmen Miranda costume, and Fantasy Records had the album pressed on yellow vinyl. 'All In Your Mind', a track off 'Goin Bananas', reached number 18 on the Billboard R&B Singles Chart . St. James was called "The Queen of Side Effect".

=== 1980s: Solo career ===
Side Effect moved to Elektra Records, where St. James was signed as a solo artist. Sylvia St. James released two albums, "Magic" produced by Larry Dunn and Lenny White, and "Echoes and Images" produced by Andre Fischer. The single "Behind My Back", written by St. James, was a Billboard single pick.

=== 1990s-present: The St. James Gospel Choir and educational pursuits ===
Sylvia St. James is original Mistress of Ceremonies for the House of Blues Sunday Gospel Brunch. She produced and directed the event. Her appearances are in a signature long, white embroidered dress with a wide, feathered hat. The Sunday Gospel Brunch was hosted at House of Blues venues across the United States in major cities such as Houston, Orlando, Chicago, New York, San Diego, Vegas, and Dallas.

On choice of repertoire, St. James was quoted as saying:

"Even with experienced gospel singers, I tell them not to try a ballad unless they can throw down and leave blood on that stage,"

— Corey Levitan, Faint Praise,

Following the close of The House of Blues, Lance Sterling, owner of The Rose in Pasadena, brought St. James in to emcee The Rose's Soulful Sunday Brunch, adding live soul and Motown music along with gospel choir.

St. James is the leader of The St. James Gospel Choir, recording and performing at different venues and on television programs including Next (MTV) and CBS.

St. James taught a class at Musicians Institute of Hollywood, where she coached children in the contemporary and traditional elements of gospel music. She also performed as the headlining act at a Juneteenth celebration in Maui in 2018.

== Discography ==
=== Solo ===
- 1980: Magic (Elektra)
- 1981: Echoes & Images (Elektra)

=== As group ===
With Side Effect

- 1977: Goin Bananas (Fantasy)
- 1978: Rainbow Visions (Fantasy)

With others

- 1977 – Gabor Szabo : Faces (Universal)
- 1978 – Willie Bobo : Hell Of An Act To Follow (Sony)
- 1978 – Wayne Henderson : Living On A Dream (Fantasy)
- 1982 – Jeff Lorber : It's A Fact (RCA)
- 1987 – Bernie Taupin : Tribe
- 1994 – George Duke : Three Originals (Verve)
- 2003 – Harry Connick Jr. : Harry For The Holidays (Sony)
- 2005 – All Nations Choir : Whole New Day
- 2009 – Sylvia St. James and Roxanne Seeman : Wailin' (Noa Noa Music)
- 2010 – Jacky Cheung : Private Corner (Universal Music )
- 2014 – Jacky Cheung : Wake Up Dreaming (Universal Music)

== Recognition ==
Timeout wrote, "5 Things We'll Miss Most About The House of Blues on Sunset: Sylvia St. James, the iconic buxom figure and the original mistress of ceremonies, earned her and HOB a page in The Gospel Music Encyclopedia. For almost two decades, the blinding light of her long, white, embroidered dresses and matching wide-brimmed feathered hats had people praising the holy spirit between spoonfuls of grits. Hallelujah."
