= Crazy (Miki Howard song) =

Single by Miki Howard

from the album Love Confessions
- B-side: "In Too Deep"
- Released: June 1988
- Recorded: 1987
- Genre: R&B, soul
- Length: 4:20
- Label: Atlantic
- Songwriter(s): Gerald Levert; Marc Gordon; Gerald Mims
- Producer(s): Gerald Levert, Marc Gordon

Miki Howard singles chronology
"That's What Love Is" (1988)	"Crazy" (1988)	"Ain't Nuthin' in the World" (1989)

"Crazy" is a song by American R&B/soul singer Miki Howard. Released in 1988, as the third single from Love Confessions. "Crazy" peaked to #38 on Billboard's Hot R&B Singles chart. The song was written and produced by Marc Gordon and Gerald Levert, of R&B group LeVert.

== Track listings and formats ==
U.S. Vinyl, 7" Inch, 45 RPM single

1. "Crazy" (Album Edit) – 3:54
2. "In Too Deep" (Album Version) – 3:59

== Charts ==
Chart (1988)	Peak position
Billboards Hot R&B Singles	38
