= Such a Good Feeling =

Single by Brothers in Rhythm
- Released: 1991
- Studio: DMC Studios
- Genre: Dance-pop; disco
- Length: 3:46
- Label: 4th & Broadway
- Songwriters: Dave Seaman; Ronnie Laws; William Jeffrey; Steve Anderson; Paul B Allen III
- Producer: Brothers in Rhythm

Brothers in Rhythm singles chronology
"Peace and Harmony" (1990)	"Such a Good Feeling" (1991)	"Forever and a Day" (1994)

Music video
- "Such a Good Feeling" on YouTube

"Such a Good Feeling" is a song by English electronic music trio Brothers in Rhythm, released as a single only by 4th & Broadway. It samples Charvoni's "Always There" which itself is a cover of a Side Effect song from 1976 (which was a bigger hit for Incognito in 1991). The original lyrics for "Always There", written by Paul B Allen III, were sampled, and different music was sampled by Brothers in Rhythm to play underneath those vocalized lyrics. Upon its first release, it reached No. 64 on the UK Singles Chart and No. 1 on the US Billboard Hot Dance Music/Club Play chart. After a re-release the same year, it reached No. 14 in the UK. On the Eurochart Hot 100, "Such a Good Feeling" reached number 43. Mixmag ranked the song number 49 in its '100 Greatest Dance Singles of All Time' list in 1996.

== Critical reception ==
Larry Flick from Billboard magazine named "Such a Good Feeling" as a "tasty slice of pop/house", and "hot diva-disco [that] blends spacy synth swirls with a busy beat-base and dramatic vocal snatches." He noted that "wriggling bass line surrounds and captivates, while well-placed samples and sax fills provide a bright and festive tone." British electronic dance and clubbing magazine Mixmag wrote, "For a while back in 1991, when being a cheesy quaver meant the music really was pretty cheesy, when half the nation's ravers liked 'ardcore and the other were up for happy dappy Italian house, this tune united us all in the kind of hugged up joy you can only look back on with a smile. A crafty vocal steal gave us all the kind of simplistic but oh-so-meaningful message you need when you're wazzed off your knackers, stripped to the waist on a podium kind of thing." James Hamilton from Music Week described the track as a "Black Box type galloper".

== Track listing ==
7" single

No.	Title	Length
1.	"Such a Good Feeling"	3:45
2.	"Brothers in Rhythm"	4:08

12" single

No.	Title	Writer(s)	Length
1.	"Such a Good Feeling (Inspirational Delight Mix)"	Paul B Allen III, Dave Seaman, Steve Anderson	5:40
2.	"Peace and Harmony (Everlasting Love Mix)"	Steve Anderson	6:38
3.	"Brothers in Rhythm (Raise Your Hands)"	Dave Seaman, Steve Anderson	3:29

== Charts ==
=== Weekly charts ===
Chart (1991)	Peak position
Europe (Eurochart Hot 100)	43
Europe (European Dance Radio)	21
France (SNEP)	50*
Ireland (IRMA)	27*
Israel (Israeli Singles Chart)	6
Luxembourg (Radio Luxembourg)	10
UK Singles (OCC)	14*
UK Airplay (Music Week)	18
UK Dance (Music Week)	11
UK Club Chart (Record Mirror)	12
US Hot Dance/Club Songs (Billboard)	1
US Hot Dance Music/Maxi Singles Sales (Billboard)	14
Re-release = *

=== Year-end charts ===
Chart (1991)	Position
UK Club Chart (Record Mirror)	94
