= Something I've Never Had =

Single by Miki Howard

from the album Can't Count Me Out
- Released: October 22, 1996
- Recorded: 1996
- Genre: R&B
- Length: 4:48
- Label: Hush
- Songwriters: Miki Howard; LeMel Humes
- Producers: LeMel Humes; Demetric Collins

Miki Howard singles chronology
"Shining Through" / "But I Love You" (1993)	"Something I've Never Had" (1996)	"Nobody" (2001)

"Something I've Never Had" is a song by American R&B/soul singer Miki Howard. Released on October 22, 1996 as a single in support of her album, Can't Count Me Out. The song didn't chart on Billboard's Hot 100 or R&B/Hip-Hop songs; however, it received minor airplay rotation on R&B stations.

== Track listings and formats ==
U.S. CD single, 12" Inch single

1. "Something I've Never Had" (Album Version) - 4:48
2. "Something I've Never Had" (Radio Edit) – 4:33
3. "Something I've Never Had" (Breakdown Version)
4. "Something I've Never Had" (Instrumental) - 4:48
5. "Something I've Never Had" (A Capella)
