= Always There (Side Effect song) =

1976 song performed by Side Effect

Single by Side Effect

from the album What You Need
- B-side: "Be Bop Rock"
- Released: 1976
- Genre: Disco; funk
- Label: Fantasy Records
- Songwriters: Paul B Allen III; William Jeffrey; Ronald W Laws

Side Effect singles chronology
"Always There" (1976)	"Finally Found Someone" (1977)

"Always There" is a 1975 song by Ronnie Laws and William Jeffrey from Laws' debut album, Pressure Sensitive (1975). After producer Wayne Henderson of the Crusaders enlisted lyricist Paul B Allen III to create a vocal version of the tune, officially making Allen a co-writer, it was re-recorded in 1976 by American R&B group Side Effect for their third album, What You Need (1976). Released by Fantasy Records, it was a minor hit, reaching the top 5 on the US Dance chart; however it was a larger hit for Incognito and Jocelyn Brown in 1991, whose version reached No. 6 in the UK.

== Incognito and Jocelyn Brown version ==
"Always There"

Single by Incognito featuring Jocelyn Brown

from the album Inside Life
- B-side: "Journey Into Sunlight"
- Released: 17 June 1991
- Genre: House; R&B; disco
- Length: 3:36 (edit); 6:38 (12” mix)
- Label: Talkin' Loud; Mercury
- Songwriters: Paul B Allen III; William Jeffery; Ronald W Laws

Incognito featuring Jocelyn Brown singles chronology
"Can You Feel Me" (1990)	"Always There" (1991)	"Don't You Worry 'bout a Thing" (1992)

Music video
- "Always There" on YouTube

In 1991, the song was covered and released by British acid jazz band Incognito and American R&B and dance singer Jocelyn Brown, whose version was the biggest hit version in the UK. This was Incognito's breakthrough hit; however, Brown had been well-known since the late 1970s. The song was released by Talkin' Loud and Mercury Records on 17 June 1991 as the second single from the band's second album, Inside Life (1991). It peaked at number two in the Netherlands and number six in the UK.

=== Background ===
Jean-Paul 'Bluey' Maunick of Incognito told about the song in an interview, "It was Gilles (Peterson) who originally suggested using Jocelyn. It was a brilliant but remote idea and I thought if you can organise that, then I'm your friend for life."

=== Chart performance ===
"Always There" was a major hit on the charts in Europe and remains the band's most successful song to date. It peaked at number two in Luxembourg and the Netherlands, where it held that position for two weeks, being held off reaching the top spot by Bryan Adams' "(Everything I Do) I Do It for You". The single entered the top 10 also in Belgium (#8), Switzerland (#8) and the United Kingdom. In the latter, it peaked at number six in its third week on the UK Singles Chart, on 7 July 1991. Additionally, "Always There" was a top-20 hit in Germany (#20) and Sweden (#19), and on the Eurochart Hot 100, it reached number 21, while peaking at number nine on the European Dance Radio Chart.

Outside Europe, it was a top-10 hit in Israel and charted in the United States, reaching number 31 on the Billboard Dance Club Songs chart.

=== Critical reception ===
AllMusic editor David Jeffries said that the club side of Incognito is represented best by the "disco flashback" "Always There" with Jocelyn Brown. Larry Flick from Billboard magazine wrote that they deliver "a domestic version of an R&B houser that has already jammed hard here in clubs", stating that the track "kicks a tough enough bass line" and complimented the performance from Brown "to push it over the top". He also noted that portions of the song's hook have also been prominently featured in "Such a Good Feeling" by English electronic music trio Brothers in Rhythm. Pan-European magazine Music & Media commented, "With the numerous dance acts of today, only the really good singers can take a song above average level. Thanks to guest vocalist/shouter Jocelyn Brown, that's exactly what happens here."

Alan Jones from Music Week stated that the singer is "proving she's still a devastating diva", viewing the track as "a surefire smash." Mandi James from NME wrote, "A guaranteed floor-filler, 'Always There' still has the effect of the original, having retained its essence, except now people are manically waving their arms in the air rather than dancing round their handbags." Another NME editor, Ian McCann, felt that it "jumps out like a dog from a gate thanks to Jocelyn Brown's heartfelt wail." Upon the release of the 1996 remix, Jeremy Newall from the Record Mirror Dance Update concluded that "Jocelyn gives her most heartfelt vocal delivery in some time." Lindsay Baker from Spin complimented it as a "stirring rendition".

=== Track listings ===
7" single

No.	Title	Length
1.	"Always There"	3:36
2.	"Journey into the Sunlight"

12" single

No.	Title	Length
1.	"Always There"	6:38
2.	"Always There (Dub Zone mix)"	6:05
3.	"Journey into the Sunlight"	4:06

== Charts ==
=== Side Effect version ===
Chart (1976)	Peak Position
US Dance Club Songs (Billboard)	20
US Hot R&B/Hip-Hop Songs (Billboard)	56

=== Incognito & Jocelyn Brown version ===
==== Weekly charts ====
Chart (1991)	Peak Position
Belgium (Ultratop 50 Flanders)	8
Europe (Eurochart Hot 100)	21
Europe (European Dance Radio)	9
Europe (European Hit Radio)	15
France (SNEP)	48
Germany (GfK)	20
Ireland (IRMA)	25
Israel (Israeli Singles Chart)	9
Luxembourg (Radio Luxembourg)	2
Netherlands (Dutch Top 40)	3
Netherlands (Single Top 100)	2
Sweden (Sverigetopplistan)	19
Switzerland (Schweizer Hitparade)	8
UK Singles (Official Charts)	6
UK Airplay (Music Week)	8
UK Dance (Music Week)	1
UK Club Chart (Record Mirror)	1
US Dance Club Songs (Billboard)	31
US Dance/Electronic Singles Sales (Billboard)	17

Chart (1996)	Peak Position
Europe (Eurochart Hot 100)	68
Europe (European Dance Radio)	13
Scotland (OCC)	34
UK Singles (OCC)	29
UK Club Chart (Music Week)	1
US Hot Dance Club Play (Billboard)	31

==== Year-end charts ====
Chart (1991)	Position
UK Singles (OCC)	98
UK Club Chart (Record Mirror)	14

Chart (1996)	Position
UK Club Chart (Music Week)	56
