= Back Again!!! =

Studio album by Milira
- Released: June 9, 1992
- Length: 54:34
- Label: Motown
- Producer: Barry J. Eastmond; Loris Holland; LeMel Humes; Milira; Dunn Pearson; Narada Michael Walden

Milira chronology
Milira (1990)	Back Again!!! (1992)	Solution (2000)

Singles from Back Again!!!
- 1. "One Man Woman" Released: May 16, 1992; 2. "Three's a Crowd" Released: July 3, 1992

Back Again!!! is the second studio album by American singer Milira. It was released by Motown Records on June 9, 1992 in the United States. The album peaked to number 81 on the US Billboard Top R&B Albums chart and features the singles, "Three's a Crowd", and "One Man Woman."

== Critical reception ==
Professional ratings
Review scores
Source	Rating
AllMusic	3/5 stars

AllMusic editor Alex Henderson rated the album three stars out of five. He found that "boasting such well-known producers as Narada Michael Walden, Barry J. Eastmond, and LeMel Humes, Back Again!!! isn't as strong as it could have been. Still, it's respectable and decent, and it should have done better."

== Track listing ==
Back Again!!! track listing
No.	Title	Writer(s)	Producer(s)	Length
1.	"One Man Woman"	Narada Michael Walden; Jeffrey Cohen	Walden	7:14
2.	"Three's a Crowd"	Nathaniel Calhoun	LeMel Humes	4:56
3.	"Ready for Love"	Loris Holland; Roz Davis	Holland	4:26
4.	"Love You Forever"	Calhoun; Humes	Humes	4:24
5.	"If You Really Love Her"	Barry J. Eastmond; Jolyon Skinner	Eastmond	4:39
6.	"Rocket Love"	Stevie Wonder	Humes	5:22
7.	"All Night"	Loris Holland	Holland	4:46
8.	"You Get Right to Me"	Eastmond; Skinner	Eastmond	4:56
9.	"Why Can't We Still Be Friends"	Walden; Sally Jo Dakota; Sydney Mills	Walden	4:42
10.	"Love Me This Way"	Holland; R. Davis	Davis	5:00
11.	"Love Always, Milira"	Milira Jones	Milira; Dunn Pearson, Jr.	4:09
Total length:				54:34

== Charts ==
Weekly chart performance for Back Again!!!
Chart (1992)	Peak position
US Top R&B/Hip-Hop Albums (Billboard)	81
