= Milira =

American singer (born 1969)

- Also known as: Milira
- Born: Milira Jones; September 27, 1969 (age 56); Hollis, New York, U.S.
- Origin: Manhattan, New York, US
- Genres: R&B, soul
- Occupation: Singer
- Years active: 1990–present
- Label: Motown Records

Milira Jones (born September 27, 1969), better known as Milira, is an American R&B/soul singer born in Hollis, New York. She released two albums in the 1990s and had four charting singles on Billboard's R&B singles chart, with two peaking top 40.

== Biography ==
Milira Jones was born in Hollis, New York. She won amateur night at the Apollo Theater in the late 1980s, which led to a recording contract with Apollo Records, a label distributed through Motown Records. Jones was influenced by jazz musician Sarah Vaughn.

=== Music career ===
Prior to signing with Motown, Jones released her debut album on June 15, 1990, Milira. Her debut album spent 42 weeks on the Billboard R&B albums chart, reaching number 29. It scored two top 40 R&B singles, "Go Outside in the Rain" (#36) and a cover version of Marvin Gaye's "Mercy Mercy Me (The Ecology)" featuring Noel Pointer (#21).

On June 9, 1992, Milira released her follow-up album, Back Again!!! and two songs from the album charted on Billboard's R&B singles chart, "One Man Woman" (#45) and "Three's a Crowd" (#94). Jones released her third album titled, Solution which was Christian and gospel themed with a mixture of R&B and Soul and also it was released under her own personal record label, Arilim Records and the CD album was released on September 12, 2000.

== Discography ==
=== Albums ===
List of studio albums, with selected chart positions
| Title | Album details | Peak chart positions |
| Title | Album details | US R&B |
|---|---|---|
| Milira | Released: June 15, 1990; Label: Motown; Format: CD, cassette, vinyl | 29 |
| Back Again | Released: June 9, 1992; Label: Motown; Format: CD, cassette, vinyl | 81 |
| Solution | Released: 2000; Label: Arilim; Format: CD, cassette | — |
| No Mo Pain | Released: March 14, 2019; Label: Arilim; Format: CD, digital download | — |

=== Singles ===
List of singles, with selected chart positions and parent album
| Title | Year | Peak chart positions | | Album |
| Title | Year | US R&B | UK | Album |
|---|---|---|---|---|
| "Waiting Here for You" | 1990 | ― | ― | Milira |
| "Mercy Mercy Me (The Ecology)" | 1990 | 21 | 87 | Milira |
| "Go Outside in the Rain" | 1990 | 36 | ― | Milira |
| "One Man Woman" | 1992 | 45 | ― | Back Again!!! |
| "Three's a Crowd" | 1992 | 94 | ― | Back Again!!! |
"—" denotes releases that did not chart.
