= Three's a Crowd (song) =

Single by Milira

from the album Back Again!!!
- Released: July 3, 1992
- Genre: Soul, R&B
- Length: 4:56
- Label: Motown Records
- Songwriter: Nathaniel Calhoun
- Producer: LeMel Humes

Milira singles chronology
"'One Man Woman"'" (1992)	"Three's a Crowd" (1992)

"Three's a Crowd" is a song written by Nathaniel Calhoun and recorded by American R&B/soul singer Milira. It was released on July 3, 1992, as a single from her 1992 album, Back Again!!!, and the second and final single from the album.

== Track listing ==
US CD Single

No.	Title	Length
1.	"Three's a Crowd" (Radio Edit)
2.	"Three's a Crowd" (Album Version)
3.	"Three's a Crowd" (Instrumental)

== Charts ==
Chart (1992)	Peak position
US Billboard Hot R&B/Hip-Hop Songs	94

== Cover version ==
- R&B/soul singer Miki Howard recorded the song for her 1997 album, Can't Count Me Out. LeMel Humes produced Howard's version of the song as well.
