= Portraits (Side Effect album) =

Studio album by Side Effect
- Released: 1981
- Recorded: 1981
- Studio: Total Experience Recording Studios (Hollywood, California)
- Genre: Soul/Disco
- Label: Elektra
- Producer: Augie Johnson

Side Effect chronology
| After the Rain (1980) | Portraits (1981) | All Aboard (1982) |

Portraits is the seventh album by R&B group Side Effect. Released in 1981, this was their second album for Elektra Records.

== Track listing ==
1. I Can't Play (Miki Howard) 3:33
2. Do It 4:16
3. Make You Mine 4:14
4. I Need Your Lovin' 3:52
5. Midnight Lover (Miki Howard) 4:46
6. It's Got To Be Love 3:54
7. Reggae Dancin' 4:58
8. If You Believe 2:47
9. The Loneliest Man In Town 4:05
10. The Lord's Prayer 1:51

== Charts ==
| Year | Album | Chart positions |
| Year | Album | US R&B |
|---|---|---|
| 1981 | Portraits | 52 |

=== Singles ===
| Year | Single | Chart positions | |
| Year | Single | US R&B | US Dance |
|---|---|---|---|
| 1981 | "Make You Mine" | 26 | 73 |
