= Effective (album) =

Studio album by Side Effect
- Released: 1973
- Recorded: 1973
- Genre: Soul/Disco
- Label: GAS
- Producer: Jim Gilstrap

Side Effect chronology
Effective (1973)	Side Effect (1975)

Effective is the debut album by R&B group Side Effect. Released in 1973, this was the group's first and only album for Canadian-based GAS Records.

It was reissued on CD in 2001 on Soul Brother Records.

== Track listing ==
1. Listen to the Beat of the Drum - (Lometta Johnson, McNeil) 3:19
2. Run Run Run - (Lometta Johnson, Jim Gilstrap) 2:17
3. Spend It on Love - (Lometta Johnson, McNeil) 3:20
4. Do Your Thing - (Jim Gilstrap) 4:52
5. Unless You're Wearing Your Emotions - (Jim Gilstrap) 3:07
6. Do You Believe - (Jim Gilstrap) 3:51
7. Tree of Love - (Jim Gilstrap) 3:19
8. Jim's Wrapp - (Jim Gilstrap) 4:28
9. Sylvia - (Jim Gilstrap, Augie Johnson) 4:12
10. Wash Your Troubles Away - (Allen) 4:09
