= After the Rain (Side Effect album) =

Studio album by Side Effect
- Released: 1980
- Recorded: 1980
- Studio: Fantasy Studios, Kendun Recorders, Ocean Way Recording
- Genre: Soul, disco
- Label: Elektra
- Producer: Wayne Henderson, Augie Johnson

Side Effect chronology
Rainbow Visions (1978)	After the Rain (1980)	Portraits (1981)

Professional ratings
Review scores
Source	Rating
AllMusic	2.5/5 stars

After the Rain is the sixth album by R&B group Side Effect. Released in 1980, it was their first album for Elektra Records as well as Miki Howard's first appearance as vocalist.

== Critical reception ==
In a review issued on May 3, 1980, a Billboard praised the variety of musical material of the album and compared it with Rufus & Chaka. The cover of Toto's "Georgy Porgy" has been described as "soulful".

== Track listing ==
1. Take a Chance 'N' Dance – 5:17 (Augie Johnson)
2. The Thrill Is Gone – 3:07 (Ed Reddick)
3. Georgy Porgy – 4:52 (David Paich)
4. Close to Me – 3:31 (Dean Gant, Johnson)
5. I Feel It's Real – 2:42 (Louie Patton, Paul Allen, Johnson)
6. Black Beauty – 4:36 (Johnson, Allen)
7. Pretty Baby – 1:22 (Miki Howard, Johnson)
8. Catch It 'Fore It Falls – 3:36 (Johnson, Allen)
9. Eleanor Rigby – 4:03 (Lennon-McCartney)
10. Superwoman – 5:53 (Greg Matta, Howard, Patton, Johnson)

== Personnel ==
=== Side Effects ===
- Augie Johnson: Vocals, handclaps, horn arrangements, string arrangements on track 10
- Gregory Matta: Vocals
- Miki Howard: Vocals
- Louie Patton: Vocals

=== Additional personnel ===
- Kenny Styles: Guitars
- George Tavy: Keyboards
- Michael Stanton: Keyboards, ARP and Prophet-5 synthesizers
- Dean Gant: ARP synthesizers
- Ed "Funky Thumbs" Reddick, Nathaniel Phillips: Bass
- Gerry Davis: Drums
- Vince "Mad Dog" Tenort: Percussion

== Charts ==
Chart (1980)	Peak positions
Billboard Top R&B Albums	70

=== Singles ===
Year	Single	US R&B
1980	"Georgy Porgy"	77
1980	"Superwoman"	64
