= One Man Woman (Milira song) =

Single by Milira

from the album Back Again!!!
- Released: May 16, 1992
- Genre: Soul; R&B
- Length: 7:14
- Label: Motown
- Songwriter(s): Narada Michael Walden; Jeffrey Cohen
- Producer(s): Narada Michael Walden

Milira singles chronology
"Waiting Here for You" (1990)	"One Man Woman" (1992)	"Three's a Crowd" (1992)

"One Man Woman" is a recorded song by American singer Milira. Released on May 16, 1992, by Motown Records, it was the lead single from her second studio album, Back Again!!!.

== Track listing ==
US CD single.

No.	Title	Length
1.	"One Man Woman" (Single Edit)	4:12
2.	"One Man Woman" (LP Version)	7:15
3.	"One Man Woman" (Instrumental)	7:14

== Charts ==
Chart (1992)	Peak position
US Billboard Hot R&B/Hip-Hop Songs	45
