= Days of Wine and Roses (song) =

- One of US single picture sleeves

Single by Andy Williams

from the album Days of Wine and Roses and Other TV Requests
- A-side: "Can't Get Used to Losing You"
- Released: March 1963
- Genre: Easy listening
- Length: 2:45
- Label: Columbia 42674
- Composer: Henry Mancini
- Lyricist: Johnny Mercer
- Producer: Robert Mersey

Andy Williams singles chronology
"Can't Get Used to Losing You" (1963)	"Days of Wine and Roses" (1963)	"Hopeless" (1963)

"Days of Wine and Roses" is a popular song, from the 1962 film of the same name.

The music was written by Henry Mancini with lyrics by Johnny Mercer. They received the Academy Award for Best Original Song for their work, as well as the 1964 Grammy Awards for Record of the Year and Song of the Year. In 2004 it finished at #39 in AFI's 100 Years...100 Songs survey of top tunes in American cinema.

The song's lyric is notable for consisting of just two complex sentences, each of which forms one of the song's two stanzas.

== Recordings ==
The best-known recordings of the song were by Billy Eckstine in 1961 and Andy Williams in 1963, but several other recording artists have also recorded the song, including Bill Evans, Dick and Dee Dee, Shirley Bassey, Frank Sinatra, Julie London, Perry Como, Blossom Dearie, Wes Montgomery (1963: Boss Guitar), McCoy Tyner, Jaco Pastorius and Lenny Breau. Tony Bennett sang his interpretation on his prestigious The Movie Song Album (1966). Pat Boone. Ella Fitzgerald and Joe Pass recorded their version of this song on their Pablo Records album Easy Living. The song has become a jazz standard.

Williams' version was recorded for Columbia Records. It was released as catalog number 42674. The song reached #9 on the adult contemporary chart and #26 on the Billboard Hot 100 chart, and was the featured track on the album, Days of Wine and Roses and Other TV Requests, which peaked at No. 1 on the Billboard 200 album chart.

Perry Como's version was recorded for RCA Victor Records. The recording was made on March 19, 1963. The record was issued by RCA Victor as a track on the album, The Songs I Love. On the Cash Box chart, where all singles were combined, the song reached a peak position of No. 30 in May 1963.

Vince Guaraldi and Bola Sete recorded an instrumental version for Fantasy Records in 1963. It was released on the album Vince Guaraldi, Bola Sete and Friends, and was a featured single (it did not chart).

In 2000, The Lettermen included the song on their Greatest Movie Hits album. R&B/soul singer Miki Howard recorded it for her 2008 album, Private Collection. In 2024, Christian McBride and Edgar Meyer included the song in their album But Who's Gonna Play the Melody?

The phrase "days of wine and roses" is originally from the poem "Vitae Summa Brevis" by the English writer Ernest Dowson (1867–1900):

They are not long, the days of wine and roses:
Out of a misty dream
Our path emerges for a while, then closes
Within a dream.

== Chart positions ==
Performer	Chart (1963)	Peak position
Andy Williams	Adult contemporary	9
Andy Williams	Billboard Hot 100	26
Henry Mancini	Billboard Hot 100	33
Henry Mancini	Billboard Easy Listening	10
