= Go Outside in the Rain =

Single by Milira

from the album Milira
- Released: November 21, 1990
- Recorded: 1989–1990
- Genre: Soul
- Length: 5:21
- Label: Motown Records
- Songwriters: Nathaniel Calhoun, Bonifacio Velasquez
- Producer: Donal Dee Bowden

Milira singles chronology
"Mercy Mercy Me (The Ecology)" (1990)	"Go Outside in the Rain" (1990)	"Waiting Here for You" (1990)

"Go Outside in the Rain" is a R&B song by Milira released on November 21, 1990. The track is from her debut album, Milira, and reached number thirty-six on Billboard's Hot R&B Singles chart.

== Track listing ==
US 12" Promo

No.	Title	Length
1.	"Go Outside in the Rain" (Radio Edit)	4:07
2.	"Go Outside in the Rain" (Album Version)	5:24
3.	"Go Outside in the Rain" (Instrumental)	5:23

== Charts ==
Chart (1990)	Peak position
U.S. Billboard Hot R&B Singles	36
