= Side Effect (album) =

Studio album by Side Effect
- Released: 1975
- Recorded: 1974
- Genre: Soul/Disco
- Label: Fantasy
- Producer: Wayne Henderson, Augie Johnson

Side Effect chronology
Effective (1973)	Side Effect (1975)	What You Need (1976)

Professional ratings
Review scores
Source	Rating
Allmusic	3/5 stars

Side Effect is the second album by R&B group Side Effect. Released in 1975, this was their first album for Fantasy Records.

== Track listing ==
1. Baby Love (Love You Baby) 3:56
2. Oh Baby 2:25
3. There She Goes Again 5:01
4. What The Heck, Let's Discothèque 4:52
5. Spend It On Love 3:37
6. Checkin' It Out 3:37
7. I Love You So Much 4:30
8. Dancin' Shoes 4:00
9. Tree Of Love 3:14
