= Noid (Yves Tumor song) =

2018 single by Yves Tumor

Single by Yves Tumor

from the album Safe in the Hands of Love
- Released: 24 July 2018
- Genre: Neo-psychedelia
- Length: 3:29
- Label: Warp Records
- Songwriter: Yves Tumor

Yves Tumor singles chronology
"Noid" (2018)	"Licking An Orchid" (2018)

"Noid" is a song by American experimental electronic music artist Yves Tumor. Written by Tumor, it was released on July 24, 2018, as the first single from Tumor's third studio album, ' 'Safe in the Hands of Love' ' on Warp Records (2018). The song is an anthemic comment on police brutality. It was produced by Yves Tumor, with Justin Raisen as co-producer and recording engineer.

"Noid" samples "Grace" by Sylvia St. James. It has a "percussive, string-sample lead" and a "hook-laden chorus" with Tumor singing lyrics invoking "fear and trauma induced by police brutality" and expressing his experience of PTSD and depression.

The song received favorable reviews from music critics who applauded the song and its accompanying music video calling it gritty, propulsive, jarring and captivating.

== Music and lyrics ==
Noid is a pop rock song with a "driving drumbeat", upfront vocals and a verse/chorus structure. Pitchfork describes instrumentation with an "upbeat pulse" and Tumor singing "with a rasp obliquely echoing Marvin Gaye's "What's Going On". Halfway into the song, "the beat grows more complex, the bass starts falling out of key, and the strings give way to faraway shrieks and low electronic groans" transforming into "a jagged, toothy snarl". The song incorporates canned strings, chunky dance beat and a buoyant bassline.

== Music video ==
An accompanying music video directed by Andreas Brauning shows Tumor walking around streets of downtown Los Angeles where he witnesses and becomes a victim of police abuse on the street, shot with "bird's-eye views and frenetic camerawork". Rolling Stone described the video as a "jarring examination of the police state". Connor Duffey of Stereogum praised Tumor's "uneasy, fiery performance", calling it his "most upfront and vulnerable" and saying he "continues shedding his outer veil." described "bird's-eye views, frenetic camerawork".

== Critical reception ==
Sasha Geffen for Pitchfork called the song "neo disco" praising it as a "beautiful new strain of pop darkness" describing "a haunted vat of explicit despair" and declaring "Tumor smashes together genres into jarring and captivating contrasts." The Guardian called it "wonky pop". The Fader praised the song calling it "stunning fruit"..."propulsive" while describing its "haunting vocals". For Stereogum, Sam Tornow opined "What it lacks in experimental instrumentation, it makes up for in its dark lyrics". Steve Erickson for GCN (Gay City News) commented the song "flipped a sample of Sylvia St. James’ disco song “Grace” into a club-ready bop" describing it as "about PTSD, police brutality, and the alienating reality of African-American life" and the production coming apart at the seams halfway through, "reflecting the lyrics’ anxiety." Spyros Stasis opined "... the main theme carries on as a mantra while the background explodes through the distorted presence, which verges towards a free rock rendition, spawning disorienting sonic artifacts."

== Personnel ==
Credits adapted from the liner notes of Safe in the Hands of Love.

=== Musicians ===
- Yves Tumor – vocals
- Luke Niccoli – bass guitar
- Evan Johns – drums
- Andreas Emanuel – electric guitar
- Sylvia St. James - performer [samples from "Grace"]

=== Technical personnel ===
- Yves Tumor – production
- Justin Raisen – co-production; engineering
- Mahssa Taghinia – executive production, management
- Luke Niccoli – additional production, additional engineering, additional editing
- Paul Corley – mixing
- Dave Cooley – mastering
