= Echoes & Images =

Studio album by Sylvia St. James
- Released: 1981
- Studios: Conway Recording Studios (Hollywood); Overdubbing at Studio 55 (Los Angeles) and Sound Labs (Hollywood)
- Genres: R&B; soul; jazz; funk
- Label: Elektra
- Producer: Andre Fischer

Sylvia St. James chronology
Magic (1981)	Echoes & Images (1981)

Echoes & Images is the second studio album by American singer and songwriter Sylvia St. James, released in 1981 by Elektra Records.

== Production ==
The album was produced by Andre Fischer with the arrangements by Richard Evans and McKinley Jackson. Lead and background vocals were arranged by St. James.

== Conception and composition ==
The singer's second recording project continues a mixture of pop and soul songs with the release of the first single, "Behind My Back", an upbeat, dance track, alongside Eastern influence in the arrangements of "Grace", featuring the 13-stringed Japanese koto, and "Eastern Man" with the four-stringed Japanese lute.

== Critical reception ==
Professional ratings
Review scores
Source	Rating
Green Bay Press-Gazette	3/5 stars
The Philadelphia Inquirer	3/5 stars

Warren Gerds of the Green Bay Press Gazette declared: "Sylvia St. James owns a great voice - a Cadillac..." describing "lavish backgroundings" and stating "soul, rhythm kickers, jazz or ballad, St. James pours out vocal gymnastics with her wide-ranging, lustrous singing." Florestine Purnell for The Kansas City Star opined that "a unique mixture of pop and other musical influences that still retain Miss St. James' soulful individuality," describing instruments that give "a vaguely Oriental feel" to songs with "quiet melodies with complex string and horn arrangements" and the upbeat single with "a familiar theme" and "danceable beat". A review for Billboard Album picks described "high-quality musical art" with "can't-miss production" of "soul/jazz excursions that command top musicianship" and "vocals roles with impressive range, drama and funk appeal," while Billboard Disco Mix noted "easy going but sassy selections", "tender ballads" and sensual vocals shining through "Grace".

== Track listing ==
Echoes & Images track listing
No.	Title	Writer(s)	Length
1.	"Behind My Back"	Dawn Alexander	3:13
2.	"Grace"	Ronnie Laws; Roxanne Seeman	5:50
3.	"Prime Time"	Clarence Bell; Therisa Hunter	4:24
4.	"Evening Rainbow"	Eduardo del Barrio; Sylvia St. James	5:27
5.	"If You Let Me Love You"	Sylvia St. James; Russell Ferrante	4:23
6.	"The Way to Your Heart"	Josef M. Blocker; Mario Henderson	4:02
7.	"The Bottom Line"	Barbara Busa; Danny Ironstone; Mary Unobsky	4:02
8.	"Eastern Man"	Josef M. Blocker	4:40
Total length:			35:58

== Personnel ==
Credits adapted from the album's liner notes.

Musicians

- Sylvia St. James – lead vocals, vocal arrangements, backing vocals (2, 4, 7)
- Eduardo del Barrio – electric piano (4)
- Alan Ciner – electric guitar (6, 7)
- Assa Drori – strings concertmaster
- Nathan East – bass (1, 2, 4, 6), synthesizer bass (8)
- Russell Ferrante – Rhodes piano (1), electric piano & Oberheim OB-X (5), acoustic piano (8)
- Andre Fischer – drums (4)
- Stewart Fischer – horn arrangement (8)
- Yolande Fischer – backing vocals (2)
- Robben Ford – electric guitar (3–8)
- Donald Griffin – guitar (1), electric guitar (3, 6)
- Jimmy Haslip – bass (3, 7)
- Marlo Henderson – electric guitar (8)
- Pat Henderson – backing vocals (7)
- Clydene Jackson – electric piano (2, 6, 8), acoustic piano (3–5, 7)
- Osamu Kitajima – koto (2), biwa (8)
- Abraham Laboriel – bass (5)
- David Lasley – backing vocals (2)
- Ricky Lawson – drums (3, 5–8)
- Arnold McCuller – backing vocals (2)
- Clarence McDonald – acoustic piano (1, 2), electric piano (7)
- Denzil Miller – Minimoog (3)
- Casey Scheuerell – drums (1, 2)
- George Sopuch – guitar (1), electric guitar (2)
- Steve Tavaglione – alto saxophone solo (2), soprano saxophone solo (4, 8)
- Julia Waters Tillman – backing vocals (7)
- Maxine Waters Willard – backing vocals (7)
- Oren Waters – backing vocals (7)

Horns

- Phil Ayling
- Chuck Findley
- Gary Grant
- Kim Hutchcroft
- Charles Loper
- Steve Madaio
- Bill Reichenbach Jr.

Technical personnel

- Andre Fischer – production
- Richard Evans – arrangements
- McKinley Jackson – arrangements (3, 6, 7)
- Michael Brownstein – recording engineer
- Howard Steele – recording engineer
- Tim Dennen – assistant engineer
- Phil Moores – assistant engineer
- Greg Stout – assistant engineer
- Stewart Whitmore – assistant engineer
- Patrick Von Wiegandt – assistant engineer
- Steve Zaretsky – assistant engineer
- Jack E. Hunt – mastering, lacquer cutting
- Ron Coro – art direction
- Norm Ung – design
- Bruce Talamon – photography

== Covers ==
Yves Tumor samples "Grace", in his critically acclaimed 2018 single Noid.
