= Goin' Bananas (album) =

Studio album by Side Effect
- Released: 1977
- Recorded: 1977
- Studio: Total Experience, Hollywood, California; Fantasy, Berkeley, California; ABC, Los Angeles, California
- Genre: Disco, jazz, soul
- Label: Fantasy
- Producer: Wayne Henderson

Side Effect chronology
What You Need (1976)	Goin' Bananas (1977)	Rainbow Visions (1978)

Professional ratings
Review scores
Source	Rating
Allmusic	3/5 stars

Goin' Bananas is the fourth album by soul group Side Effect. Released in 1977 by Fantasy Records, it was produced by Wayne Henderson. Like other releases by the group, the work featured an R&B based sound greatly influenced by contemporary disco and jazz music. In terms of background, the group had endured a major line-up change as singer Helen Lowe had her role taken over by Sylvia St. James.

The album embraced bananas as a gimmick. Besides the cheeky title, the cover depicts vocalist Sylvia St. James in an outfit highly reminiscent of film icon Carmen Miranda. The record company even pressed the release on yellow vinyl.

Goin' Bananas ended up receiving supportive yet mixed reviews. Music critic Alex Henderson of Allmusic stated that he thought singer St. James can show "herself to be an expressive and capable vocalist", yet the group still appeared to fall short in comparison to their previous work. He still highlighted several tracks for praise such as "It's All In Your Mind" and "Private World", remarking on the latter's "infectious funk".

== Track listing ==
1. Goin' Bananas 5:40
2. Open Up Your Heart 3:08
3. Watching Life 4:38
4. Keep On Keepin' On 7:10
5. It's All Your Mind 4:24
6. Private World 3:46
7. Mr. Monday 3:07
8. Never Be The Same 4:42
9. Back In Time 3:43
10. Cloudburst 2:04

== Charts ==
Chart (1978)	Peak positions
Billboard 200	86
Top R&B Albums	53

=== Singles ===
Year	Song title	Peak chart positions
Year	Song title	U.S. R&B Singles
1978	"It's All In Your Mind"	18
