= LeMel Humes =

American songwriter

Lemuel “LeMel” Humes
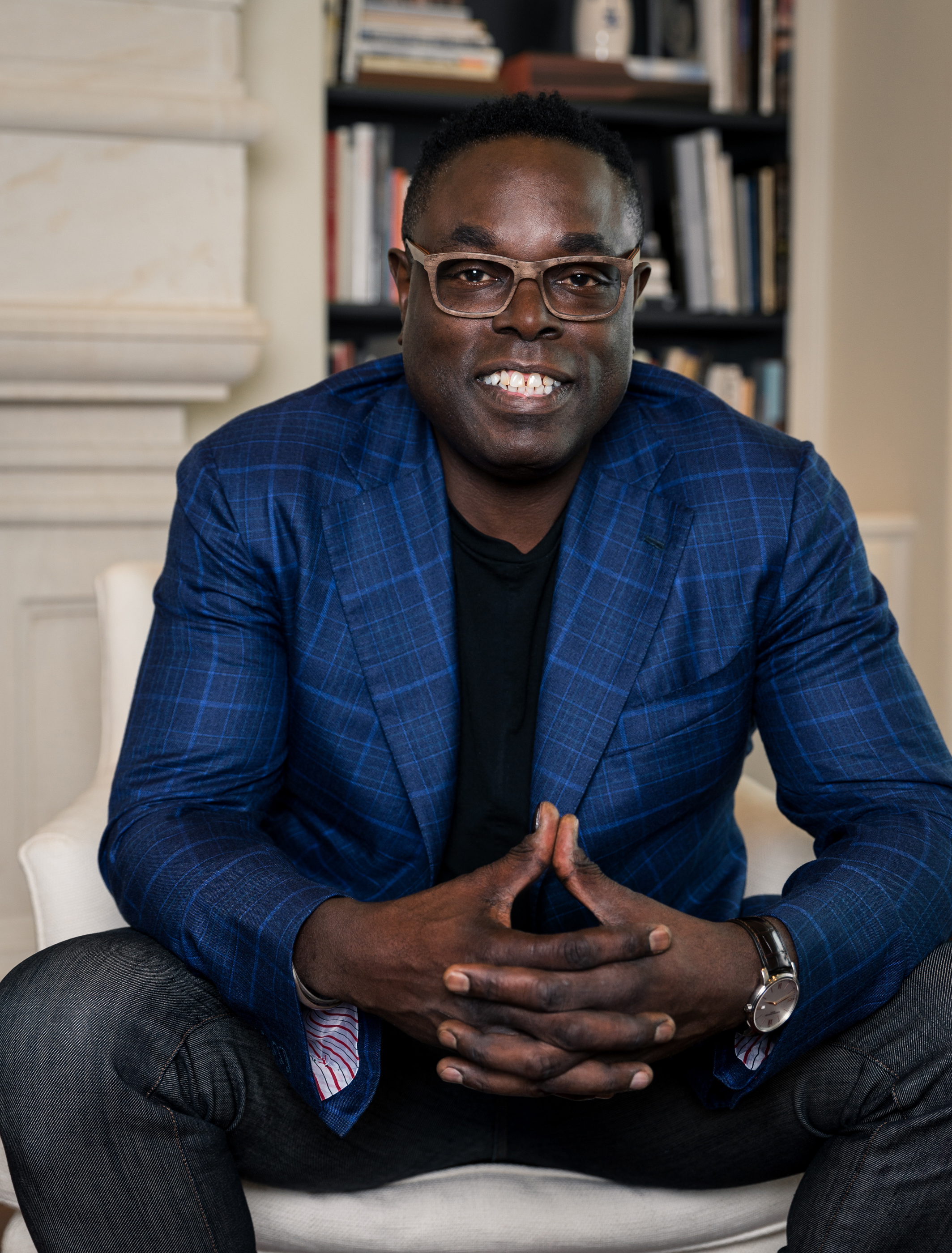

Background information
- Born: Lemuel Nigel Humes
- Occupations: Songwriter, composer, & Producer
- Years active: 1986–present
- Labels: Warner Bros., Arista

Lemuel “LeMel” Humes is an American songwriter/composer, musician, singer, and producer. He is perhaps best-known for his longstanding songwriting and production relationship with R&B/soul singer Miki Howard, particularly his work on her early/breakthrough albums.

== Career ==
Humes began his recording career in the early 1980s, releasing the single "Dance So Fine" under the name Nijel in 1982.

Working as a staff songwriter for Warner Brothers Music Publishing, he earned more public recognition when he wrote and produced nearly all of the tracks on Miki Howard's Atlantic Records debut album, Come Share My Love, including the top-ten R&B chart hit title track. Humes also played various keyboards and provided backing vocals throughout the album, while also arranging several songs. His other highlights on the album include a vocal duet with Howard on the song "I Can't Wait (to See You Alone)" and performing all instruments (via the "Kurzweil 250 Computer Systems") on the song "My Friend" Co-written by Dyan Humes. Humes continued working with Howard, writing and producing several songs on her second album, Love Confessions, including (again) the title track.

This early success segued into work with other artists, including Stephanie Mills (producing "Comfort of a Man" on her Home album), The Pointer Sisters (co-writing their final top 40 R&B hit of the 1980s, "He Turned Me Out", featured on the soundtrack to the 1988 film Action Jackson), Ray Charles (writing "Let Me Take Over" on his My World album), Thelma Houston, and Meli'sa Morgan. He scored his first number one R&B hit in 1989, writing and producing Stacy Lattisaw's duet with Johnny Gill, "Where Do We Go from Here".

Humes also continued to work with Miki Howard throughout the 1990s and into the 2000s, returning to a prominent role on her Femme Fatale and Can't Count Me Out albums, the first of which included her number one R&B hit, "Ain't Nobody Like You".

Humes served on the Austin Film Society Board from 2019 to 2025, including as Board Secretary from 2022 to 2025.

== Select Discography ==
=== Songs written/composed ===
==== Miki Howard ====
- "Come Share My Love" (writer)
- "Come Back to Me Lover" (writer)
- "I Wanna Be There" (writer)
- "Love Confessions" (writer)
- "Ain't Nobody Like You" (writer)
- "Something I've Never Had" (writer)

==== Stacy Lattisaw ====
- "Where Do We Go from Here" (duet with Johnny Gill) (also produced)

==== The Pointer Sisters ====
- "He Turned Me Out"

==== Ray Charles ====
- "Let Me Take Over"

==== Thelma Houston ====
- "High"

==== Meli'sa Morgan ====
- "So Long, Goodbye"

==== Sweet Obsession ====
- "I Want to Know"

==== Amii Stewart ====
- "Stay With Me (We Can Work it Out)"

=== Songs/Albums produced ===
==== Miki Howard ====
- Come Share My Love (producer)
- "Imagination" (producer)
- "But I Love You" (producer)
- "Cigarette Ashes on the Floor" (producer)
- "I've Been Through It" (producer)

==== Stephanie Mills ====
- "Comfort of a Man"

==== Milira ====
- "Three's a Crowd"
