= Brothers in Rhythm =

British electronic music group

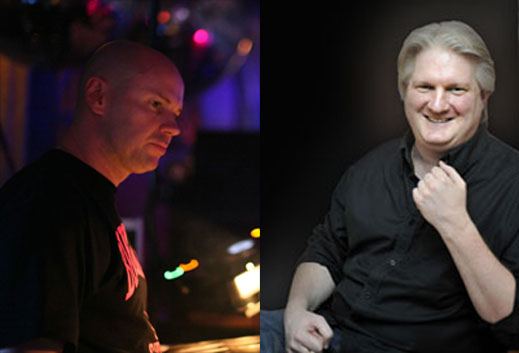
- L–R: Founding members Dave Seaman and Steve Anderson in 2007 and 2012 respectively

Background information
- Origin: United Kingdom
- Genres: Electronic, house, dance
- Years active: 1990–present
- Labels: 4th & Broadway
- Members: Dave Seaman; Steve Anderson; Alan Bremner

Brothers in Rhythm are a British electronic music group comprising Dave Seaman, Steve Anderson and Alan Bremner. The group was originally a duo comprising Seaman and Anderson, with Bremner joining later in 1999. They have remixed and/or produced tracks by Lulu, M People, Secret Life, Rebekah Ryan, Seal, Janet Jackson, Michael Jackson, Orchestral Manoeuvres in the Dark, New Order, Dannielle Gaha, Pet Shop Boys, Kylie Minogue, Garbage, Placebo, Alanis Morissette, U2 and many others.

== Biography ==
As Brothers in Rhythm, they hit number one on the U.S. Billboard Hot Dance Club Play chart in 1991 with "Such a Good Feeling". It reached No. 14 on the UK Singles Chart upon re-issue in September 1991. In 1994, they released the single "Forever and a Day", billed as Brothers in Rhythm present Charvoni, but this was not very successful on the UK Singles Chart, reaching No. 51.

== Discography ==
=== Singles ===
Title	Year	Peak chart positions					Album
Title	Year	UK	IRE	FRA	US Dance	US Dance Sales	Album
"Peace and Harmony"	1990	94	—	—	—	—	Non-album singles
"Such a Good Feeling"	1991	64	—	—	1	14	Non-album singles
"Such a Good Feeling" (reissue)	1991	14	27	50	—	—	Non-album singles
"Forever and a Day" (featuring Charvoni)	1994	51	—	—	11	53	Non-album singles
"—" denotes a recording that did not chart or was not released in that territory.

== See also ==
- List of Billboard number-one dance club songs
- List of artists who reached number one on the U.S. Dance Club Songs chart
