= Private Collection (Miki Howard album) =

Studio album by Miki Howard
- Released: June 3, 2008
- Length: 36:24
- Label: Branicka
- Producer: Chuckii Booker; Brandon McCune; Miki Howard

Miki Howard chronology
Pillow Talk (2006)	Private Collection (2008)	I Choose to Be Happy (2015)

Private Collection is the ninth studio album by R&B singer Miki Howard that was released in 2008 by her label. The first five tracks are a blend of R&B/soul songs co-produced by Howard and producer/singer Chuckii Booker. Howard collaborated with pianist, composer, and producer Brandon McCune to produce five of her favorite classic standards. Howard sings interpretations of "Skylark", "Guess Who?" and "Days of Wine and Roses".

== Track listing ==
No.	Title	Writer(s)	Producer(s)	Length
1.	"Crazee"	Miki Howard, Chuckii Booker	Chuckii Booker, Miki Howard	4:04
2.	"Favorite Time of the Year"	Howard, Booker	Booker, Howard	4:16
3.	"Beer for Breakfast"	Howard, Booker	Booker, Howard	3:57
4.	"She" (featuring Chuckii Booker)	Howard, Booker	Booker, Howard	3:54
5.	"You Made Me Love You"	Howard, Booker	Booker, Howard	5:08
6.	"Skylark"	Johnny Mercer, Hoagy Carmichael	Brandon McCune, Miki Howard	2:43
7.	"Secret Love"	Paul Francis Webster, Sammy Fain	McCune, Howard	4:02
8.	"Days of Wine and Roses"	Henry Mancini, J. Mercer	McCune, Howard	3:44
9.	"Guess Who?"	Murray Grand, Elisse Boyd	McCune, Howard	2:16
10.	"Counting My Blessings"	Irving Berlin	McCune, Howard	2:28

Notes

- "Guess Who?" and "Count My Blessings" renamed for this album, originally titled as "Guess Who I Say Today" and "Count Your Blessings (Instead of Sheep)".

== Personnel ==
- Miki Howard – Vocals, Composer
- Chuckii Booker – Keyboards, Background Vocals, Composer
- Brandon McCune – Piano
- Trevor Allen – Bass
- Producer – Chuckii Booker, Brandon McCune, Miki Howard

== Charts ==
Chart performance for Private Collection
Chart (2008)	Peak position
US Top R&B/Hip-Hop Albums (Billboard)	60
