= Rainbow Visions =

Studio album by Side Effect
- Released: 1978
- Recorded: 1978
- Studio: Total Experience, Hollywood, California; United Western, Hollywood, California; Ocean Way, Hollywood, California; ABC, Los Angeles, California
- Genre: Soul/Disco
- Label: Fantasy
- Producer: Wayne Henderson, Augie Johnson

Side Effect chronology
| Goin' Bananas (1977) | Rainbow Visions (1978) | After the Rain (1980) |

Professional ratings
Review scores
| Source | Rating |
|---|---|
| Allmusic | 2.5/5 stars |

Rainbow Visions is the fifth album by R&B group Side Effect. Released in 1978, this was their fourth and final album for Fantasy Records.

== Track listing ==
1. Peace of Mind 4:35
2. Disco Junction 3:30
3. She's a Lady 4:07
4. Illee, Illee, Oh I Know 6:45
5. Rainbow Visions 4:10
6. Falling in Love Again 3:45
7. I Like Dreaming 4:38
8. I'm a Winner 4:10

== Charts ==
| Chart (1979) | Peak position |
|---|---|
| US Top LPs & Tape | 135 |
| US Top Soul LPs | 57 |
