= All Aboard (Side Effect album) =

Studio album by Side Effect
- Released: 1982
- Recorded: 1982
- Studio: Total Experience Recording Studios (Hollywood, California), Kenyan Recorders (Burbank, California), Ocean Way Recording, (Hollywood, California)
- Genre: Soul/Disco
- Label: Elektra
- Producer: Augie Johnson

Side Effect chronology
Portraits (1981)	All Aboard (1982)

All Aboard is the eighth album by R&B group Side Effect. Released in 1982, this was their third and final album for Elektra Records.

== Track listing ==
1. I'm Likin' What You Do to Me 4:17
2. Scatman 4:23
3. Music Is My Way of Life 3:46
4. Forever My Love 4:21
5. You Can Do It 3:41
6. Attitudes 4:05
7. Take Me as I Am 4:13
8. My Way 5:18
9. I Want To... 5:12

== Personnel ==
- Bobby Lyle, Michael Stanton - Keyboards
- Michael Boddicker - Synthesizer
- Ed Reddick, Nate Phillips, Robert Popwell - Bass
- Gerry Davis, Ronnie Kaufmann - Drums
- Vance Tenort - Percussion
- Boppin' Brass - Horns
