= UK statutory notification system =

Infectious disease notification system in the UK

The UK statutory notification system for infectious diseases (also called Notifications of Infectious Diseases or NOIDS) is a system whereby doctors are required to notify a "proper officer" of the local authority (such as a Consultant in Communicable Disease Control) if they are presented with a case of a serious infectious disease such as diphtheria or measles. The proper officer then sends a report to the Centre for Infections of the Health Protection Agency (HPA) in Colindale, north London.

The main purpose of the system is the detection and intervention in possible epidemics. It also enables surveillance data to be collected that can help in planning ways to prevent future outbreaks.

== History of the statutory notification system ==
The statutory requirement for the notification of certain infectious diseases first came into being with the Infectious Disease (Notification) Act 1889 (52 & 53 Vict. c. 72), which made reporting compulsory in London and optional in the provinces. Cases of smallpox, cholera, diphtheria, membranous croup. erysipelas, scarlatina or scarlet fever, typhus fever, typhoid fever, enteric fever, relapsing fever, continued fever and puerperal fever had to be reported by the household head or attending doctor to the local authority. The system spread to the rest of England and Wales in 1899 with the Infectious Disease (Notification) Extension Act 1899 (62 & 63 Vict. c. 8). Householders or general practitioners who failed to notify a case of one of these diseases was liable to a fine of up to forty shillings. Following receipt of a notification certificate, the local sanitary authority could pursue existing public health laws, such as the Public Health Act 1875 (38 & 39 Vict. c. 55), to isolate patients in hospital, disinfect property and belongings, suspend schooling, and temporarily close businesses.

Originally, disease statistics were collected from the local authorities by the Registrar General's Office, where national statistics were already collected on births, marriages and deaths. This office was later known as the Office of Population Censuses and Surveys and is now called the Office for National Statistics. In 1997, however, the responsibility for administering the system was transferred to the Communicable Disease Surveillance Centre (CDSC), now the Health Protection Agency's Health Protection Services Division (HPS).

== The system today ==
The main concern of the modern system is speed in detecting possible outbreaks, and accuracy of diagnosis is only secondary. Since 1968 clinical suspicion of a notifiable infection is all that is required to report a case of a disease. The attending doctor must notify the proper officers, who are usually public health clinicians called consultants in communicable disease control. These consultants are required to inform the HPA on a weekly basis of each case of a disease that has been notified. The HPA collates these reports and publishes its analysis of local and national trends.

As of June 2022, the list of notifiable diseases contains 34 entries, including leprosy. During the 2002-2003 outbreak, SARS was added to the list as the 31st.

Some of the notifiable diseases are:

- Anthrax
- Cholera
- COVID-19
- Dysentery
- Food poisoning
- Malaria
- Measles
- Meningitis
- Mumps
- Plague
- Polio
- Rabies
- Rubella
- Scarlet fever
- Smallpox
- Tetanus
- Tuberculosis
- Typhoid fever
- Typhus fever
- Viral hepatitis
- Whooping cough

== See also ==
- List of notifiable diseases includes other countries
- Notification system describes general notification systems
