= Noel Pointer =

American jazz violinist and record producer

- Born: December 26, 1954; Brooklyn, New York, U.S.
- Died: December 19, 1994 (aged 39) Brooklyn, New York, U.S.
- Genres: Smooth jazz, post-disco
- Occupation: Musician
- Instrument: Violin
- Years active: 1967–1994
- Labels: United Artists, Liberty

Noel Pointer (December 26, 1954 – December 19, 1994) was an American jazz violinist and record producer, whose life inspired a music foundation.

== Career ==
Pointer made his solo debut at the age of 13, performing Vivaldi with the Symphony of the New World, followed by guest solo appearances with the Chicago Chamber Orchestra and Detroit Symphony Orchestra.

He began playing jazz on the violin while a student at The High School of Music and Art in New York City. While attending college at Manhattan School of Music, Pointer earned a reputation as a session musician. By age 19, his experience as a freelance musician included the Apollo Theater Orchestra, the Love Unlimited Orchestra, the Westbury Music Fair Orchestra, the Radio City Music Hall Symphony, the Love Unlimited Orchestra (US Tour), the Dance Theater of Harlem Orchestra, the Symphony of the New World, and the pit orchestras of several Broadway shows, including Guys and Dolls and Dreamgirls.

From 1977 to 1981, Pointer recorded seven solo albums, four of which reached the top five jazz albums listed on the Billboard jazz chart. His debut album, Phantazia, went platinum and won the No.1 New Male Jazz Act award in Record World magazine. He was the guest soloist on Milira's Mercy, Mercy, Me (The Ecology) and Dianne Reeves's The Tracks of My Tears. His albums All My Reasons (1981) and Direct Hit (1982) were nominated for Grammy Awards. He also wrote music for the Joyce Trisler Danscompany and the Inner City Ensemble Theater and Dance Company.

Pointer received special citations from the United States Congress, the US Congressional Black Caucus, and the African National Congress (ANC). He served as a music advisory panelist for the National Endowment for the Arts (NEA) and the United States Information Agency (USIA) and was among the youngest people to have held those positions. In 1992 he founded the National Movement for the Preservation of the Sacred African Burial Grounds of New York City.

In 1993 he released Never Lose Your Heart, which turned out to be his final album; he died of a stroke on December 19, 1994, at age 39.

== Personal life ==
Pointer was married to Chinita and had two daughters and a son; he lived in Brooklyn.

After his death, Chinita Pointer founded the Noel Pointer Foundation, a nonprofit organization dedicated to bringing string music education to inner-city students, which is located in Bedford Stuyvesant, Brooklyn, New York.

== Discography ==
=== As Leader/co-leader ===
- Phantazia (Blue Note, 1977)
- Hold On (United Artists, 1978)
- Feel It (United Artists, 1979)
- Calling (United Artists, 1980)
- All My Reasons (Liberty, 1981)
- Direct Hit (Liberty, 1982) – rec. 1981
- Never Lose Your Heart (Shanachie, 1993)
- The Voice....The Violin with Kuh Ledesma (Universal, 1994)

=== Singles ===
- 1977: "Living for the City"
- 1978: "Stardust Lady"
- 1979: "For You (A Disco Concerto) Part 1" / "For You (A Disco Concerto) Part 2"
- 1981: "Classy Lady"
- 1981: "All the Reasons Why" (released in the Philippines)
- 1981: "East St. Louie Melody" (released in the Philippines)
- 1982: "Direct Hit"
