= What You Need (Side Effect album) =

Studio album by Side Effect
- Released: 1976
- Recorded: 1976
- Studio: Sound Factory and Hollywood Sound (Hollywood); Fantasy Studios (Berkeley)
- Genre: Soul/Disco
- Label: Fantasy
- Producer: Wayne Henderson (for Home Productions)

Side Effect chronology
Side Effect (1975)	What You Need (1976)	Goin' Bananas (1977)

Professional ratings
Review scores
Source	Rating
Allmusic	4/5 stars

What You Need is the third album by R&B group Side Effect. Released in 1976, this was their second album for Fantasy Records.

== Track listing ==
1. Always There 5:04 (Paul Allen, Ronnie Laws, William Jeffrey)
2. Keep That Same Old Feeling 7:06 (Wayne Henderson)
3. Time Has No Ending 3:55 (Henderson, Esau Joyner)
4. S.O.S 4:06 (Helen Lowe, August W. Johnson)
5. Honky Tonk Scat 3:45 (Johnson, Henderson)
6. Finally Found Someone 2:53 (Joyner)
7. Changes 3:36 (Gregory Matta, Louie Patton)
8. Life Is What You Make It 2:54 (Johnson)
9. I Know You Can 6:21 (Johnson)

== Charts ==
Chart (1977)	Peak position
Billboard 200	115
Top R&B Albums	26

=== Singles ===
Year	Single	Chart positions	
Year	Single	US R&B	US Dance
1976	"Always There"	56	2
1977	"Finally Found Someone"	85	—
1977	"S.O.S."	88	—
