= Three Wishes (Miki Howard album) =

Studio album by Miki Howard
- Released: March 27, 2001
- Recorded: 2000
- Length: 43:56
- Label: Peak
- Producer: DaMone Arnold; Gary Brown; Barry Eastmond; LeMel Humes; Darius McCrary; Sam Sims

Miki Howard chronology
Can't Count Me Out (1997)	Three Wishes (2001)	Pillow Talk (2006)

Singles from Three Wishes
- 1. "Nobody" Released: 2001; 2. "Kiss of a Stranger" Released: 2002

Three Wishes is the seventh studio album by American R&B singer Miki Howard. It was released by Peak Records on March 27, 2001. The album features production by Barry Eastmond, LeMel Humes, and Family Matters actor Darius McCrary, who also sings background vocals on the track "Meant to Be." Executive producers on Three Wishes include Russ Freeman of jazz band The Rippingtons and Andi Howard. The album peaked at number 60 on the US Top R&B/Hip-Hop Albums chart but failed to chart on the US Billboard 200. It was nominated in the Best Traditional R&B Vocal Album category at the 2002 Grammy Awards.

== Critical reception ==
Professional ratings
Review scores
Source	Rating
AllMusic	2.5/5 stars

AllMusic editor Alex Henderson called the album a "pleasant, if unremarkable, CD." He found that "instead of trying to make herself relevant to the hip-hop-minded R&B scene of the early '00s, Howard sticks to her guns and emphasizes adult-oriented quiet storm music [...] Three Wishes won't go down in history as one of Howard's more essential releases, although her hardcore fans will probably want to hear it anyway."

== Track listing ==
Three Wishes track listing
No.	Title	Writer(s)	Producer(s)	Length
1.	"Three Wishes"	Sam Sims; Darrell Smith	Sam Sims	4:45
2.	"One Day Without You"	Gary Brown; Curtis Williams	Gary Brown	4:26
3.	"Nobody"	Gordon Chambers	Barry Eastmond	5:00
4.	"From Now On"	Nina Ossoff; Stephanie Salzman	Damone Arnold	3:57
5.	"Ain't No Way to Treat a Lady"	Harriet Schock	Eastmond	4:36
6.	"Don't Give Your Heart"	Brown; Barry Eastmond; Allan Rich	Brown	4:52
7.	"Kiss of a Stranger"	Brown; Damon Banks	Brown	3:42
8.	"Imagine"	Sims	Sims	5:10
9.	"Bring Your Loving Home"	Tonye Hilmon; Eddie Towns, Jr.	LeMel Humes	5:20
10.	"Meant to Be"	Hilmon; Towns, Jr.	Darius McCrary	4:23

== Charts ==
Chart performance for Three Wishes
Chart (2001)	Peak position
US Independent Albums (Billboard)	25
US Top R&B/Hip-Hop Albums (Billboard)	60
