= Side Effect (band) =

American disco and jazz-funk band

- Origin: Los Angeles, California, U.S.
- Genres: R&B, funk, soul, jazz
- Years active: 1972–1982
- Labels: Fantasy Records, Elektra Records
- Members: Bobbie Anderson; Milton Ellis; Barry Jackson
- Past members: Augie Johnson; Sylvia Nabors; Helen Lowe; Miki Howard; Lometta Johnson; Jim Gilstrap; Gregory Matta; Louie Patton

Side Effect was an American disco and jazz-funk band, that recorded between 1972 and 1982. The group was formed in Los Angeles, California in 1972 by Augie Johnson who became their leader.

== Career ==
Side Effect was formed by Augie Johnson and members, Lometta Johnson, Jim Gilstrap, Gregory Matta and Louis Patton in May 1972. The group played many Los Angeles area clubs and within a few months the group signed their first record deal with a company called Avenue of America-Gas Records with whom they recorded their first album Effective. The album did not chart. Not discouraged, Side Effect continued to evolve. They changed female lead vocalists, from Lometta Johnson to Sylvia Nabors, and soon joined At-Home Productions, a production company headed by Wayne Henderson of The Crusaders.

This new association would bear fruit with a new record deal with Fantasy Records. The self-titled Side Effect was released in 1975 but it did not chart. By their third album, What You Need they had switched vocalists from Sylvia Nabors to Helen Lowe, now gospel superstar Helen Baylor. This was their first charting album going to number 26 on the R&B chart. Two more albums Goin' Bananas and Rainbow Visions were released now featuring vocalist Sylvia St. James who replaced Lowe but they charted moderately. After these four albums were completed, Side Effect left Fantasy Records and was picked up by Elektra Records. After the Rain now featuring a 19-year-old Miki Howard replacing St. James on vocals was released in 1980. It did not do well on the charts as well as the next two Elektra albums Portraits and All Aboard.

Howard left the group and began a solo career in 1986. The group briefly re-united and issued a single entitled "I Love You" in 1987 (Striped Horse record label). They later became known as Augie's Side Effect.

On October 11, 2014, founder Augie Johnson died at age 66. On June 16, 2020, Louie Patton died at age 71, leaving behind 5 children and 3 grandchildren.

== Discography ==
=== Studio albums ===
Year	Album	Chart positions		Record label
Year	Album	US	US R&B	Record label
1973	Effective	—	—	GAS Records
1975	Side Effect	—	—	Fantasy Records
1976	What You Need	115	26	Fantasy Records
1977	Goin' Bananas	86	53	Fantasy Records
1978	Rainbow Visions	135	57	Fantasy Records
1980	After the Rain	—	70	Elektra
1981	Portraits	—	52	Elektra
1982	All Aboard	—	—	Elektra
1995	"N" Effect	—	—	Dog House Records
"—" denotes the album failed to chart

=== Singles ===
Year	Single	Chart positions	
Year	Single	US R&B	US Dance
1976	"Always There"	56	20
1977	"Finally Found Someone"	85	—
1977	"Keep That Same Old Feeling"	22	—
1977	"S.O.S."	88	—
1978	"It's All in Your Mind"	18	—
1979	"She's a Lady"	68	—
1980	"Georgy Porgy"	77	—
1980	"Superwoman"	64	—
1981	"Make You Mine"	26	73
1987	"I Love You"	—	—
"—" denotes the single failed to chart
