= Morris Broadnax =

American songwriter

- Birth name: Morris Ervin Broadnax
- Also known as: Luvel Broadnax
- Born: February 9, 1931; Detroit, Michigan, U.S.
- Died: February 17, 2009 (aged 78)
- Genres: Soul music
- Occupation: Songwriter
- Years active: 1961–1969

Morris Ervin Broadnax (February 9, 1931 – February 17, 2009), sometimes credited as Luvel Broadnax (the name of his second wife), was an American songwriter for Motown in the 1960s, most notably working with Stevie Wonder with whom, along with Clarence Paul, he co-wrote Aretha Franklin's hit "Until You Come Back to Me (That's What I'm Gonna Do)".

== Life and career ==
He was born in Detroit, Michigan, and after graduating high school joined the US Air Force. He later worked on the Ford assembly line in Detroit, and his friend Abdul "Duke" Fakir of the Four Tops encouraged his singing career. He auditioned for Mickey Stevenson at Motown and, though the company did not offer him a recording contract, Stevenson liked one of the songs he had written and performed, and signed him to a songwriting contract in 1961.

At Motown, he worked closely with songwriter and record producer Clarence Paul, and with the young Stevie Wonder. His most successful songs, all co-written with Paul and Wonder, included the Contours' 1966 hit "Just a Little Misunderstanding"; "All I Do (Is Think About You)", first recorded by Tammi Terrell and later by Brenda Holloway, and by Stevie Wonder on his album Hotter Than July; and "Until You Come Back to Me (That's What I'm Gonna Do)", first recorded by Wonder but unreleased at the time and picked up by Aretha Franklin. Franklin's recording of the song reached No. 1 on the R&B chart and No. 3 on the Hot 100 chart in 1974. Broadnax also wrote for the Four Tops, the Temptations, Gladys Knight & the Pips, Marvin Gaye – for whom he co-wrote with Mickey Stevenson and Fredericka Foreman the title track of his 1964 album When I'm Alone I Cry – and other Motown artists.

Broadnax left Motown in 1969. He became a community activist, promoting higher quality education in Detroit's public schools. In the late 1980s he also tried, unsuccessfully, to organize a Motown Alumni Association. He received many awards, including the Award of Merit from Mayor Coleman A. Young, the Spirit of Detroit Award, and recognition from Black Parents for A Quality Education.

He died on February 17, 2009, from congestive heart failure.
