= Can't Count Me Out =

Studio album by Miki Howard
- Released: May 27, 1997
- Recorded: 1996–1997
- Genre: R&B; soul; jazz; funk
- Label: Hush
- Producer: LeMel Humes, Kenneth Crouch, Chaka Khan, Robby Takac, Demetric Collins

Miki Howard chronology
Miki Sings Billie (1993)	Can't Count Me Out (1997)	Three Wishes (2001)

Professional ratings
Review scores
Source	Rating
Allmusic	2.5/5 stars

Can't Count Me Out is the sixth studio album by American R&B/jazz singer Miki Howard, released in 1997 under Hush Records. Howard's first studio recording in four years, the album contains a mixture of soulful ballads, some groovy R&B and a duet with father Clay Graham of gospel group, The Pilgrim Jubilees. Also featured are a few cover tunes, including Janis Ian's "At Seventeen" produced by Robby Takac, member of the rock group Goo Goo Dolls, and Stevie Wonder's "I Love Every Little Thing About You", a duet with pop/R&B singer Terence Trent D'Arby with Chaka Khan singing background vocals. The album also features the track, "Sunshine", written by R&B singer/songwriter Brenda Russell.

== Track listing ==
No.	Title	Writer(s)	Producer(s)	Length
1.	"I Love Every Little Thing About You" (featuring Terence Trent D'Arby)	Stevie Wonder	Kenneth Crouch	4:56
2.	"Sunshine"	Brenda Russell, Ron Sperman	LeMel Humes	3:58
3.	"Three's a Crowd"	Nathaniel Calhoun	Humes	4:45
4.	"You Don't Know What Love Is"	Gene de Paul, Don Raye	Humes	4:45
5.	"At Seventeen"	Janis Ian	Robby Takac	5:02
6.	"Get Over You"	Miki Howard, Humes	Humes	4:32
7.	"Something I've Never Had"	Howard, Humes	Humes, Demetric Collins	4:48
8.	"Summer"	Howard, Humes	Humes	3:49
9.	"Can't Count Me Out" (featuring Clay Graham)	Howard	Humes	4:58
10.	"I Love Every Little Thing About You" (Instrumental)	Wonder	Crouch	4:55

== Singles ==
- "Something I Never Had"
- "I Love Every Little Thing About You"
