= Pillow Talk (Miki Howard album) =

Studio album by Miki Howard
- Released: September 19, 2006
- Length: 42:07
- Label: Shanachie
- Producer: Chris "Big Dog" Davis; Miki Howard; Kim Waters; Danny Weiss

Miki Howard chronology
| Three Wishes (2001) | Pillow Talk (2006) | Private Collection (2008) |

Pillow Talk – Miki Sings the R&B Classics is the eighth studio album by American R&B singer Miki Howard released on September 19, 2006 under Shanachie Records label. On this album, Howard sings her interpretations of favorite R&B classic songs. It peaked at number 60 on Billboard's Top R&B/Hip-Hop Albums chart.

== Critical reception ==
Professional ratings
Review scores
| Source | Rating |
|---|---|
| AllMusic | 2.5/5 stars |

AllMusic editor Andy Kellman found that even Howard's "most devout fans might feel a little shortchanged by the shortage of original material here. Howard's voice is in fine form, but she doesn't always sound inspired by the songs, and the arrangements tend to be lukewarm, whether they involve drum loops or smooth jazz stylings. The highlights include versions of Ann Peebles' "I Can't Stand the Rain" and Boz Scaggs' "Lowdown," as well as the title track."

== Track listing ==
| No. | Title | Writer(s) | Length |
|---|---|---|---|
| 1. | "I Can't Stand the Rain" | Ann Peebles; Don Bryant; Bernard Miller | 3:53 |
| 2. | "Do That to Me One More Time" | Toni Tennille | 4:03 |
| 3. | "Go Away Little Boy" | Gerry Goffin; Carole King | 3:07 |
| 4. | "Pillow Talk" | Sylvia Robinson; Michael Burton | 4:41 |
| 5. | "This Masquerade" | Leon Russell | 2:55 |
| 6. | "Inseparable" | Chuck Jackson; Marvin Yancy | 2:14 |
| 7. | "Lowdown" | Boz Scaggs; David Paich | 3:46 |
| 8. | "Misty Blue" | Bob Montgomery | 5:24 |
| 9. | "Just Don't Want to Be Lonely" | Bobby Eli; Vinnie Barrett; John Freeman | 4:07 |
| 10. | "Which Way Is Up" | Norman Whitfield | 3:22 |

Notes

- "Go Away Little Boy" is a cover of Marlena Shaw's "Yu-Ma/Go Away Little Boy" from her 1977 album Sweet Beginnings.

== Charts ==
Chart performance for Pillow Talk
| Chart (2006) | Peak position |
|---|---|
| US Top R&B/Hip-Hop Albums (Billboard) | 60 |
