= Miki Sings Billie: A Tribute to Billie Holiday =

Studio album by Miki Howard
- Released: 1993
- Recorded: 1992
- Genre: Jazz, R&B
- Length: 37:32
- Label: Giant
- Producer: David Foster (Tracks:1 - 5); LeMel Humes (Tracks:6 - 10)

Miki Howard chronology
Femme Fatale (1992)	Miki Sings Billie: A Tribute to Billie Holiday (1993)	Can't Count Me Out (1997)

Miki Sings Billie: A Tribute to Billie Holiday is a studio album by American R&B singer Miki Howard. Released in 1993 by Giant Records, the album peaked at No. 72 on Billboard's Top R&B Albums chart. The album is a tribute to jazz singer Billie Holiday, Howard covers some of her favorite songs recorded by Holiday.

== Track listing ==
No.	Title	Writer(s)	Length
1.	"What a Little Moonlight Can Do"	Harry Woods	3:53
2.	"I'm a Fool to Want You"	Frank Sinatra; Jack Wolf; Joel Herron	4:03
3.	"My Man"	Jacques Charles; Channing Pollock; Albert Willemetz; Maurice Yvain	3:07
4.	"Solitude"	Duke Ellington; Eddie DeLange; Irving Mills	4:41
5.	"'Tain't Nobody's Bizness If I Do"	Porter Grainger; Everett Robbins	2:55
6.	"Yesterdays"	Jerome Kern; Otto Harbach	2:14
7.	"Now or Never"	Billie Holiday; Curtis Lewis	3:46
8.	"Don't Explain"	Arthur Herzog, Jr.; Billie Holiday	5:24
9.	"Strange Fruit"	Lewis Allen	4:07
10.	"Your Mother's Son-In-Law"	Alberta Nichols; Mann Holiner	3:22

== Film ==
- In 1992, Miki Howard portrayed jazz legend Billie Holiday in Spike Lee's Malcolm X, singing Holiday's "I Cover the Waterfront".

== Charts ==
Chart (1993)	Peak position
U.S. Billboard R&B/Hip-Hop Albums	72
