= Imagination (1940 song) =

1940 song by Jimmy Van Heusen and Johnny Burke

Song
- Published: 1940
- Composer: Jimmy Van Heusen
- Lyricist: Johnny Burke

"Imagination" is a popular song with music written by Jimmy Van Heusen and the lyrics by Johnny Burke. The song was first published in 1940. The two best-selling versions were recorded by the orchestras of Glenn Miller and Tommy Dorsey in 1940.

== Composition ==
Jimmy Van Heusen originally wrote the song when he was a teenager, but with different words. When he later played the tune for Johnny Burke (without the lyrics), Burke wrote the "Imagination" lyrics.

== Recordings ==
The recording by Glenn Miller (vocals Ray Eberle) was released by Bluebird Records as catalog number 10622. It first reached the Billboard magazine Best Seller chart on July 20, 1940, and lasted 3 weeks on the chart, peaking at #3.

The recording by Tommy Dorsey was released by Victor Records as catalog number 26581. It reached the Billboard magazine Best Seller chart at #8 on July 20, 1940, its only week on the chart.

== Miki Howard rendition ==
"Imagination"

Single by Miki Howard

from the album Come Share My Love
- B-side: "You Better Be Ready to Love Me"
- Released: January 1987
- Recorded: 1986
- Genre: Jazz
- Length: 4:16
- Label: Atlantic
- Songwriters: Johnny Burke; Jimmy Van Heusen
- Producer: LeMel Humes

Miki Howard singles chronology
"Come Share My Love" (1986)	"Imagination" (1987)	"Come Back to Me Lover" (1987)

The song was covered in 1987 by American R&B singer Miki Howard. Released as the second single from Howard's debut album, Come Share My Love. The song was a top 20 R&B hit, peaking at number 13 on the Hot R&B Singles chart.

=== Charts ===
Chart (1987)	Peak position
US Billboard Hot R&B/Hip-Hop Songs	13

== Other recorded versions ==
The song has been recorded by, among others:

- Steve Allen (released by Columbia Records as catalog number 39589)
- Georgie Auld and his orchestra (recorded February 1940, released by Varsity Records as catalog number 8199)
- Chet Baker – Chet Baker Quartet featuring Russ Freeman (Pacific Jazz)
- Shirley Bassey
- Dave Brubeck – Plays and Plays and Plays (1962)
- Chick Bullock and his orchestra (recorded February 21, 1940, released by Vocalion Records as catalog number 5434)
- June Christy – Fair and Warmer! (1957); A Friendly Session, Vol. 1 (2000) with the Johnny Guarnieri Quintet
- Petula Clark (recorded 1963, released by Pye Records as catalog number 7N15517)
- Rosemary Clooney – Love (1963), and Rosemary Clooney Sings the Music of Jimmy Van Heusen (Concord, 1986)
- Harry Connick, Jr. on 20
- Bing Crosby and John Scott Trotter's orchestra (recorded December 24, 1947, released by Decca Records as catalog number 24696)
- Doris Day (recorded November, 1947, released by Columbia Records as catalog number 38423, also as catalog number 38698)
- Al Donahue and his orchestra (recorded March 18, 1940, released by Vocalion Records as catalog number 5434, also by Conqueror Records as catalog number 9453)
- Jimmy Dorsey
- Bob Dylan – Triplicate (2017)
- Billy Eckstine with Pete Rugolo arr, cond) and his All Stars, including Pete Candoli (tp), Don Fagerquist (tp), Bud Shank (as, fl), Gerald Wiggins (p), Red Callender (b), Larry Bunker (ds). Recorded in Los Angeles, CA on January 2, 1958.
- Percy Faith & His Orchestra with Mitch Miller from the album "It's So Peaceful In The Country"
- Ella Fitzgerald (recorded February 15, 1940, released by Decca Records as catalog number 3078B) and recorded live in 1961 at the Crescendo Club in West Hollywood (released in 2009 in the album Twelve Nights In Hollywood).
- Maynard Ferguson – Boy With Lots of Brass (1957) (vocal by Irene Kral)
- The Fleetwoods
- The Four Freshmen – Golden Anniversary Celebrations (2001)
- Curtis Fuller – Imagination (Savoy 1960)
- Johnny Griffin – Tough Tenors (Jazzland 1960)
- Lionel Hampton
- Dick Haymes – The Complete Capitol Collection (2006)
- Miki Howard – Come Share My Love (1986)
- Keith Jarrett – on disc 4 of Keith Jarrett at the Blue Note (1994)
- Jazz Lab – Jazz Lab (1957)
- Stan Kenton – on the album The Romantic Approach (1961)
- Cleo Laine (released 1968 on her album That Old Feeling)
- Dean Martin (released October 1960 on his album This Time I'm Swingin'!)
- Art Pepper on his 1957 album Art Pepper Meets the Rhythm Section
- Lucy Ann Polk – Lucy Ann Polk with the Dave Pell Octet (1954)
- The Quotations recorded a doo-wop version in 1961 on Verve Records (VK10245)
- Andy Russell (released by Capitol Records as catalog number 20034)
- Jan Savitt and his orchestra (recorded January 24, 1940, released by Decca Records as catalog number 2990B)
- Little Jimmy Scott (released by Savoy Records as catalog number 1174)
- Rocky Sharpe and the Replays had a UK Top 40 hit with a Doo-wop version in 1979.
- Dinah Shore (recorded February 21, 1940, released by Bluebird Records as catalog number 10668)
- Frank Sinatra and Tommy Dorsey – Legendary Sides (1997)
- Kate Smith (recorded May 1, 1940, released by Columbia Records as catalog number 35486)
- Keely Smith – I Wish You Love (1957)
- Jeri Southern – Bygone Days (2009), Romance in the Dark (2009)
