= Love Confessions =

Studio album by Miki Howard
- Released: October 26, 1987
- Recorded: 1987
- Genre: R&B
- Length: 44:07
- Label: Atlantic
- Producer: LeMel Humes; Nick Martinelli; Gerald Levert; Marc Gordon; Peter Lord & V.Jeffrey Smith; Arif Mardin

Miki Howard chronology
Come Share My Love (1986)	Love Confessions (1987)	Miki Howard (1989)

Singles from Love Confessions
- 1. "Baby, Be Mine" Released: 1987; 2. "That's What Love Is" Released: 1988; 3. "Crazy" Released: 1988

Professional ratings
Review scores
Source	Rating
AllMusic	3/5 stars
The Encyclopedia of Popular Music	3/5 stars
New Musical Express	7/10
The Rolling Stone Album Guide	3/5 stars

Love Confessions is the second studio album by American R&B singer Miki Howard, released in 1987 via Atlantic Records. It peaked at No. 145 on the Billboard 200 and No. 13 on the Billboard Top R&B Albums chart.

The album's first two singles, "Baby, Be Mine" and "That's What Love Is", were R&B hits, peaking at No. 5 and No. 4, respectively, on the Billboard Hot Black Singles chart. The third single, "Crazy", reached No. 38 on the same chart.

== Critical reception ==
The Rolling Stone Album Guide wrote that Love Confessions "works best when Howard emphasizes the jazzier side of her sound." The Gazette called the album "superior late-night couch-crawling soul."

== Track listing ==
No.	Title	Writer(s)	Producer(s)	Length
1.	"Baby, Be Mine"	Ashley Ingram, Jackie Rawe	Nick Martinelli	5:29
2.	"You've Changed"	Bill Carey, Carl T. Fischer	Arif Mardin	3:32
3.	"That's What Love Is" (featuring Gerald Levert)	Marc Gordon, Miki Howard, Gerald Levert	Levert, Gordon	4:30
4.	"In Too Deep"	Peter Lord, V. Jeffrey Smith	V. Jeffrey Smith, Peter Lord	3:59
5.	"Crazy"	Gordon, Levert	Levert, Gordon	4:20
6.	"Bitter Love"	Lord	Smith, Lord	4:23
7.	"I Wanna Be There"	LeMel Humes	LeMel Humes	4:05
8.	"Reasons"	Philip Bailey, Charles Stepney, Maurice White	Martinelli	4:10
9.	"Love Confession"	Humes	Humes	5:04
10.	"Edge of Love" (Bonus track CD only)	Scott Cutler, Cynthia Weil	Steve Tyrell, David Kitay	4:35

Notes

- "Edge of Love" also appears on the 1987 film soundtrack Fatal Beauty, starring actress-comedian Whoopi Goldberg.

== Credits and personnel ==
- Executive-Producer – Sylvia Rhone, Bob Merlin, and Miki Howard
- Producers — Nick Martinelli, Arif Mardin, LeMel Humes, Gerald Levert and Marc Gordon
  Peter Lord, V. Jeffrey Smith, David Kitay, Steve Tyrell
- Mastered [Production] – Dennis King
- Mastered [CD] – Stephen Innocenzi

== Charts ==
=== Weekly charts ===
Chart (1987)	Peak position
US Billboard 200	145
US Top R&B/Hip-Hop Albums (Billboard)	13

=== Singles ===
Year	Title	US Pop	US R&B	UK
1987	"Baby, Be Mine"	—	5	—
1988	"That's What Love Is" (featuring Gerald Levert)	—	4	—
1988	"Crazy"	—	38	—
