= Until You Come Back to Me (That's What I'm Gonna Do) =

1973 song composed by Stevie Wonder, performed by Aretha Franklin

Single by Aretha Franklin

from the album Let Me in Your Life
- B-side: "If You Don't Think"
- Released: November 1973
- Studio: Atlantic Studios (New York, NY)
- Genre: Soul; pop
- Length: 3:28
- Label: Atlantic
- Songwriters: Morris Broadnax, Clarence Paul, Stevie Wonder
- Producers: Arif Mardin, Jerry Wexler

Aretha Franklin singles chronology
"Angel" (1973)	"Until You Come Back to Me (That's What I'm Gonna Do)" (1973)	"I'm in Love" (1974)

Official audio
- "Until You Come Back to Me (That's What I'm Gonna Do)" on YouTube

"Until You Come Back to Me (That's What I'm Gonna Do)" is a song written by Morris Broadnax, Clarence Paul, and Stevie Wonder. The song was originally recorded by Stevie Wonder in 1967, but his version was not released as a single and did not appear on an album until 1977's anthology Looking Back.

The best-known version of this song is the 1973 release by Aretha Franklin, who had a million-selling Top 10 hit on Billboard charts. The song reached No. 1 on the R&B chart and No. 3 on the Hot 100 the week of February 23, 1974. It became an RIAA Gold record. Franklin's version of the song was ranked by Billboard as the No. 11 song for 1974.

== Personnel ==
Aretha Franklin version

- Aretha Franklin – lead vocals, acoustic piano
- Kenneth Bichel – synthesizer
- Margaret Branch – background vocals
- Ann S. Clark – background vocals
- Donny Hathaway – electric piano
- Hugh McCracken – guitar
- Bernard Purdie – drums
- Chuck Rainey – electric bass
- Pat Smith – background vocals
- Richard Tee – organ
- Arif Mardin – horn arrangement, string arrangement
- Joe Farrell – flute
- Gene Orloff – concert master

== Track listing ==
- 7-inch single

A. "Until You Come Back to Me (That's What I'm Gonna Do)" – 3:25
B. "If You Don't Think" – 3:49

== Charts ==
=== Weekly charts ===
Chart (1973–1974)	Peak position
Canada RPM Top Singles	8
UK Singles Chart (The Official Charts Company)	26
US Billboard Hot 100	3
US Billboard Easy Listening	33
US Billboard R&B Singles	1
US Cash Box Top 100	7

=== Year-end charts ===
Chart (1974)	Rank
Canada	101
US Billboard Hot 100	11
US Cash Box	59

== Miki Howard version ==
"Until You Come Back to Me (That's What I'm Gonna Do)"

Single by Miki Howard

from the album Miki Howard
- Released: April 26, 1990
- Recorded: 1989
- Genre: Soul
- Length: 4:03
- Label: Atlantic
- Songwriters: Morris Broadnax, Clarence Paul, Stevie Wonder
- Producers: Jon Nettlesbey, Terry Coffey

Miki Howard singles chronology
"Love Under New Management" (1989)	"Until You Come Back to Me (That's What I'm Gonna Do)" (1990)	"Come Home to Me" (1990)

Music video
- "Until You Come Back to Me" on YouTube

Miki Howard recorded the song for her 1989 album Miki Howard. Her version was an R&B hit in 1990 when it peaked at No. 3 on Billboard's Hot Black Singles chart. Mark Romanek directed the video for Howard's rendition.

=== Track listings ===
- US 7-inch vinyl single

A: "Until You Come Back to Me (That's What I'm Gonna Do)" – 4:03
B: "Come Share My Love" – 4:43

- US 12-inch vinyl single

A: "Until You Come Back to Me (That's What I'm Gonna Do)" (Remix 12" Version) – 5:22
B1: "Until You Come Back to Me (That's What I'm Gonna Do)" (LP Version) – 4:00
B2: "Until You Come Back to Me (That's What I'm Gonna Do)" (Remix Dub) – 4:46

- UK 12-inch vinyl single

A: "Until You Come Back to Me (That's What I'm Gonna Do)" (Brixton Bass Mix) – 5:20
B1: "Until You Come Back to Me (That's What I'm Gonna Do)" (LP Version) – 4:00
B2: "Come Share My Love" (LP Version) – 4:43

- UK CD single
1. "Until You Come Back to Me (That's What I'm Gonna Do)" – 4:05
2. "Come Share My Love" – 4:42
3. "Until You Come Back to Me (That's What I'm Gonna Do)" (Brixton Bass Mix) – 5:20

=== Charts ===
==== Weekly charts ====
Chart (1990)	Peak position
UK (The Official Charts Company)	67
US Billboard R&B	3

==== Year-end charts ====
Chart (1990)	Rank
US Billboard R&B	70

== Other cover versions ==
- In 1983, Leo Sayer featured a cover on his album Have You Ever Been in Love, and released it as a single, titled "Till You Come Back to Me". It reached No. 51 in the UK.
- The song was again covered in 1983 by Luther Vandross who released it on his album Busy Body as part of a medley with "Superstar", as well as its closing track. The medley peaked at No. 87 on the Billboard Hot 100 and No. 5 on the Hot Black Singles chart in 1984.
- Basia recorded this song on her 1990 album London Warsaw New York. When released as a single, her version reached No. 33 on Billboard's Adult Contemporary chart. The music video for her cover featured footage shot in Seattle, with scenes including the Alaskan Way Viaduct and the landmark Paramount Theatre. The clip was directed by Nick Morris.
