= Come Share My Love =

Studio album by Miki Howard
- Released: November 19, 1986
- Recorded: 1986
- Genre: R&B
- Length: 37:43
- Label: Atlantic
- Producer: LeMel Humes; Peter Scherer

Miki Howard chronology
Come Share My Love (1986)	Love Confessions (1987)

Singles from Come Share My Love
- 1. "Come Share My Love" Released: 1986; 2. "Imagination" Released: 1987; 3. "Come Back to Me Lover" Released: 1987

Professional ratings
Review scores
Source	Rating
AllMusic	2/5 stars

Come Share My Love is the debut studio album by American R&B singer Miki Howard. Released on November 19, 1986, under Atlantic Records label, the album peaked at #171 on the Billboard 200 and #19 on the Billboard R&B Albums Chart. Howard scored her first hit song off the debut album when "Come Share My Love" peaked to #5 on Billboard's Hot Black Singles Chart in 1986.

The following singles "Imagination" reaching #13 and "Come Back to Me Lover" at #33, earning Howard three songs from this album charting in the top 40 on Billboard's Black Singles Chart.

== Track listing ==
No.	Title	Writer(s)	Producer(s)	Length
1.	"Come Share My Love"	LeMel Humes	LeMel Humes	4:44
2.	"Love Will Find a Way"	Humes	Humes	4:26
3.	"Imagination"	Johnny Burke, James Van Heusen	Humes	4:16
4.	"Come Back to Me Lover"	Miki Howard, Kevin Phillips, Kenny Harris	Humes	4:57
5.	"I Can't Wait (To See You Alone)"	Humes, Péter Scherer	Humes, Scherer	4:10
6.	"I Surrender"	Howard, Phillips, Harris	Humes	4:15
7.	"My Friend"	Howard, Dyan Humes, Humes	Humes	3:20
8.	"You Better Be Ready to Love Me"	Glen Ballard, Clif Magness	Humes	4:03
9.	"Do You Want My Love"	Humes, Scherer	Humes, Scherer	4:55

*Credits

== Credits ==
- Co-producer – Peter Scherer
- Coordinator [Production] – Diane Connal
- Mastered – Barry Diament
- Photography – Roy Volkmann
- Producer – LeMel Humes

== Charts ==
=== Weekly charts ===
Chart (1986–1987)	Peak position
US Billboard 200	171
US Top R&B/Hip-Hop Albums (Billboard)	19

=== Year-end charts ===
Chart (1987)	Position
US Top R&B/Hip-Hop Albums (Billboard)	41

== Singles ==
Year	Title	US Pop	US R&B	UK
1986	"Come Share My Love"	—	5	—
1987	"Imagination"	—	13	—
1987	"Come Back to Me Lover"	—	33	—

== External ==
- mikihowardmedia.com
- music.aol.com/song/mikihoward
