= Miki Howard (album) =

Studio album by Miki Howard
- Released: October 24, 1989
- Recorded: 1988–1989
- Genre: R&B
- Length: 50:05
- Label: Atlantic
- Producer: Jon Nettlesbey & Terry Coffey; Gerald Levert & Marc Gordon; Nick Martinelli; Larry Blackmon

Miki Howard chronology
Love Confessions (1987)	Miki Howard (1989)	Femme Fatale (1992)

Singles from Miki Howard
- 1. "Ain't Nuthin' in the World" Released: 1989; 2. "Love Under New Management" Released: 1989; 3. "Until You Come Back to Me (That's What I'm Gonna Do)" Released: 1990; 4. "Come Home to Me" Released: 1990

Professional ratings
Review scores
Source	Rating
AllMusic	4/5 stars

Miki Howard is the third studio album by American R&B singer Miki Howard, released in 1989 on Atlantic Records. The album peaked at No. 4 on the Billboard Top R&B Albums chart. Howard scored her first number-one song with the lead single released from the album, "Ain't Nuthin' in the World", on the Billboard R&B Singles chart.

The follow-up singles, "Love Under New Management" written by Philly songwriters Gabriel Hardeman, and Annette Hardeman and a cover of Aretha Franklin's 1974 number-one R&B hit, "Until You Come Back to Me (That's What I'm Gonna Do)", both scored top five success peaking at No. 2 and No. 3, respectively, on the R&B Singles chart. Howard's version of "Until You Come Back to Me (That's What I'm Gonna Do)" also reached No. 67 on the UK Singles Chart, her first and only song on this chart.

== Track listing ==
No.	Title	Writer(s)	Producer(s)	Length
1.	"If You Still Love Her"	Terry Coffey, Jon Nettlesbey	Jon Nettlesbey, Terry Coffey	5:31
2.	"Come Home to Me"	Terry Coffey, Jon Nettlesbey	Nettlesbey, Coffey	5:42
3.	"Until You Come Back to Me (That's What I'm Gonna Do)"	Morris Broadnax, Clarence Paul, Stevie Wonder	Nettlesbey, Coffey	4:03
4.	"Ain't Nuthin' in the World"	Terry Coffey, Jon Nettlesbey	Nettlesbey, Coffey	4:54
5.	"Love Under New Management"	Annette Hardeman, Gabriel Hardeman	Nick Martinelli	6:46
6.	"I'll Be Your Shoulder" (featuring Gerald Levert)	Gerald Levert, Marc Gordon	Gerald Levert, Marc Gordon	5:08
7.	"Love Me All Over"	Coffey, Nettlesbey	Nettlesbey, Coffey	4:03
8.	"Mister"	Levert, Gordon	Levert, Gordon	3:45
9.	"Just the Way You Want Me To"	Duane Mitchell, Terry Stubbs	Levert, Gordon	5:18
10.	"Who Ever Said It Was Love"	Miki Howard	Larry Blackmon	4:55

Notes

- "I'll Be Your Shoulder", "Mister" features background vocals by Gerald Levert, and "Just the Way You Want Me To" features background vocals by Eddie Levert, Sr. of The O'Jays, Terry Stubbs, Levert's sons Gerald and Sean Levert. "Love Me All Over" features background vocals by R&B singer Keith Washington. "Who Ever Said It Was Love" produced by Larry Blackmon of Cameo.

== Charts ==
=== Weekly charts ===
Chart (1990)	Peak position
US Billboard 200	112
US Top R&B/Hip-Hop Albums (Billboard)	4

=== Singles ===
Year	Title	US R&B	UK
1989	"Ain't Nuthin' in the World"	1	—
1989	"Love Under New Management"	2	—
1990	"Until You Come Back to Me (That's What I'm Gonna Do)"	3	67
1990	"Come Home to Me"	53	—
