= Femme Fatale (Miki Howard album) =

Studio album by Miki Howard
- Released: September 15, 1992
- Genres: R&B; soul; jazz
- Length: 52:24
- Label: Giant
- Producers: LeMel Humes; Rhett Lawrence; Jon Nettlesbey & Terry Coffey; Kenny Gamble & Leon Huff; David Foster; Miki Howard

Miki Howard chronology
Miki Howard (1989)	Femme Fatale (1992)	Miki Sings Billie (1993)

Singles from Femme Fatale
- 1. "Ain't Nobody Like You" Released: 1992; 2. "Release Me" Released: 1993

Professional ratings
Review scores
Source	Rating
AllMusic	3/5 stars

Femme Fatale is the fourth studio album by American R&B/jazz singer Miki Howard. Released in 1992 under Giant Records, the album peaked at No. 110 on the US Billboard 200 and No. 7 on Billboard's Top R&B Albums chart. The first single from the album, "Ain't Nobody Like You", reached No. 1 on the R&B Singles chart, her second number one on the chart.

The follow-up single, "Release Me", peaked at No. 43 on the chart. A cover of Billie Holiday's "Good Morning Heartache" (and "Shining Through", released as a single) received modest radio-airplay on US R&B and jazz stations.

== Track listing ==
No.	Title	Writer(s)	Producer(s)	Length
1.	"Good Morning Heartache"	Billie Holiday	Rhett Lawrence	4:21
2.	"This Bitter Earth"	Clyde Otis	LeMel Humes	5:13
3.	"Hope That We Can Be Together Soon" (duet with Christopher Williams)	Kenny Gamble, Leon Huff	Gamble & Huff	4:59
4.	"Shining Through"	David Foster, Linda Thompson, Michael Kamen	David Foster	4:30
5.	"But I Love You"	Jud Friedman, Miki Howard	Humes	4:51
6.	"Ain't Nobody Like You"	LeMel Humes	Humes	4:55
7.	"I've Been Through It"	Miki Howard	Humes	4:13
8.	"Release Me"	Jon Nettlesbey, Terry Coffey	Nettlesbey, Coffey	5:11
9.	"Thank You for Talkin' to Me, Africa"	Sylvester Stewart	Humes	4:29
10.	"Cigarette Ashes on the Floor"	Craig Cooper, Miki Howard	Humes	5:12
11.	"New Fire from An Old Flame"	Diane Warren	Foster	4:21

== Credits and personnel ==
- Co-producer – Miki Howard
- Executive producer – Cassandra Mills
- Producer – Kenneth Gamble, Leon Huff
- Producer, arranger, keyboards, drums – Rhett Lawrence
- Producer, drums, percussion – Jon Nettlesbey
- Producer, keyboards – David Foster
- Producer, keyboards, synthesizer – Terry Coffey
- Producer, programmer, keyboards, percussion – LeMel Humes

== Charts ==
=== Weekly charts ===
Chart (1992)	Peak position
US Billboard 200	110
US Top R&B/Hip-Hop Albums (Billboard)	7

== Singles ==
Year	Title	US Pop	US R&B
1992	"Ain't Nobody Like You"	84	1
1992	"Release Me"	—	43

Year-end charts (singles)

Year	Title	Chart	Position
1992	"Ain't Nobody Like You"	US Hot R&B Singles	35
