= Miki Howard =

American singer (born 1960)

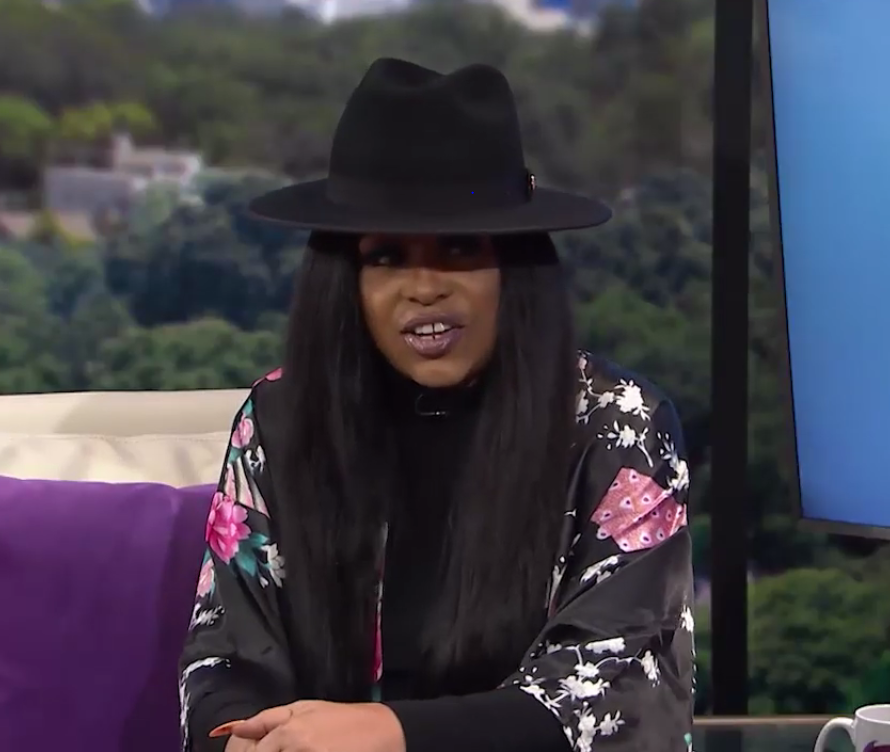
- Howard during an interview in July 2019
- Born: Alicia Michelle Howard; September 30, 1960 (age 65); Chicago, Illinois, U.S.
- Occupations: Singer; songwriter
- Years active: 1979–present
- Spouse: Eddie Phelps (m. 1989; div. 1996)
- Children: 3, including B Howard
- Musical career
- Genres: R&B; soul; jazz
- Instrument: Vocals
- Labels: Atlantic; Giant; Warlock; Hush; Peak; Shanachie; Branicka
- Website: www.mikihowardmedia.com

Alicia Michelle "Miki" Howard (born September 30, 1960) is an American R&B singer who had top 10 hit songs in the mid-1980s and early 1990s, including "Baby, Be Mine" (1987), "Come Share My Love" (1986) and "Love Under New Management" (1990). "Ain't Nobody Like You" (1992) and "Ain't Nuthin' in the World" (1989) both peaked at number one on the U.S. Billboard Top R&B Singles chart.

== Early life ==
Howard was born in Chicago, Illinois. She is the daughter of gospel singers Josephine Howard (January 26, 1936 – December 31, 1978) of The Caravans and Clay Graham (1936–2018) of The Pilgrim Jubilees. Howard's mother took her to the homes of various stars such as Aretha Franklin and Mavis Staples. At the age of nine, Howard and her family moved to Los Angeles where Howard's mother sang in a choir led by Caravans member and arranger James Cleveland. Among those who visited Howard's Los Angeles residence were Albertina Walker, Shirley Caesar, Billy Preston and Fats Domino. Howard was also influenced by jazz greats, Billie Holiday, Dinah Washington and Nancy Wilson. As a teenager, she often visited Maverick's Flat, a popular night club in Los Angeles and a venue for music acts such as Rufus and Chaka Khan and Earth, Wind & Fire, who were influential in her pursuit of a professional singing career.

== Career ==
=== 1980–1985: Side Effect ===
At the age of 16, she performed in a teen pageant. After the show, she met singer Augie Johnson, leader and member of R&B group Side Effect, who happened to be in the audience and began working with Howard on music. Johnson charmed Howard and later chose her as the vocalist for the group. After a period of time, Howard became a Side Effect member in 1979—replacing the departure of Sylvia St. James. Howard's tenure with the group lasted a few years. With Miki as new female vocalist, Side Effect's After the Rain was released in 1980. The album did not do well on the charts as well as the next two Elektra albums Portraits and All Aboard. As a member of Side Effect, the group's best remembered "I Can't Play" and a cover of Toto's "Georgy Porgy" were minor R&B hits in 1983/84. During this time, she also had one child by Johnson. In addition to singing with Side Effect, she did background vocals for Wayne Henderson, Roy Ayers, Stanley Turrentine, and several other artists. By 1985, Howard decided she was ready to begin a solo career, and left the group. She put together a demo that landed her a recording contract with Atlantic Records.

=== 1986–1990: Come Share My Love, Love Confessions and Miki Howard ===
Howard began recording songs for her debut album, Come Share My Love released in 1986. The album was produced by LeMel Humes, would peak to number 19 on the Billboard Top R&B Albums. The first single, "Come Share My Love" would become her first U.S. hit single. The song peaked to number five on the Billboard R&B Singles chart. By the fall, the follow-up single was a cover version of Glenn Miller's 1940's tune "Imagination", peaked to number 13 on the R&B Singles and would become Howard's first video. With two hit singles from the album, she embarked on her first concert tour in 1987, opening for funk band Cameo. The final single, "Come Back to Me Lover" was released charting to number 33, on the R&B singles chart.

In November 1987, Howard released her second album, Love Confessions. LeMel Humes produced several tracks and became a close friend, working with Howard on future albums throughout her career. Her success continued with two more Top 10 R&B singles from the album, Nick Martinelli produced, soul ballad "Baby, Be Mine" climbed to number five on the R&B Singles chart. The second single "That's What Love Is", a duet with hit-making R&B crooner Gerald Levert (lead singer of R&B group Levert), peaked to number five on the R&B Singles chart. Levert produced the duet and final single "Crazy", which peaked at number 38 on the R&B singles. Howard and Gerald's group LeVert, embarked on a U.S. tour in support of their album's. The pair was also romantically involved and that romance would spawn one of Howard's biggest hits from her third album. On March 30, 1988, Howard won a Soul Train Music Award for Best New Artist.

In November 1989, Howard released her third album, the self-titled Miki Howard, which would become her final album on Atlantic. Following the release, the album became a hit, charting at number four on the Billboard Top R&B Albums chart. The album would become Howard's most successful to date. During recording, Howard and Gerald Levert's romantic relationship, spawned the song's "I'll Be Your Shoulder", "Mister" and "Just The Way You Want Me To"; written-produced by Levert. Howard secured her first chart-topper, the first single, "Ain't Nuthin' in the World", peaked at number-one on the R&B Singles. Howard scored two more Top 5 R&B hits from the album. The songs "Love Under New Management", penned during her affair with Gerald Levert, peaked to number two and a cover of "Until You Come Back to Me (That's What I'm Gonna Do)", at number three on the R&B singles chart.

=== 1992–1997: Femme Fatale, Miki Sings Billie and Can't Count Me Out ===
By 1992, Howard was no longer a recording artist with Atlantic, she was now signed as an artist with Giant Records. On September 15, Howard's fourth studio album, Femme Fatale was released. The album peaked at number seven on the Billboard Top R&B Albums chart. Producer/songwriter LeMel Humes produced the majority of the album, including the first single, "Ain't Nobody Like You". The song peaked at number one on the R&B Singles chart, Howard's second R&B chart-topper and number 64 on the Billboard Hot 100. A second single and music video for "Release Me", was released, the song received modest radio airplay and peaked at number 43 on the R&B singles chart and also peaked at number 35 on the R&B/Hip-Hop Airplay charts. More singles were released as 'promotional, radio-only', the David Foster produced, "Shining Through" and "But I Love You", produced by LeMel Humes.

In director Spike Lee's 1992 bio-pic film Malcolm X, Howard portrayed jazz singer Billie Holiday, performing Holiday's "I Cover the Waterfront". She had always been strongly influenced by Holiday's vocal technique and music. In the fall of 1992, Miki decided to pay tribute to Billie by recording covers of her favorite classic songs by Holiday. During recording, she also landed a role in John Singleton's 1993 film Poetic Justice starring pop singer Janet Jackson and hip-hop artist/actor Tupac Shakur. In December 1993, Miki's fifth studio album, Miki Sings Billie was released under Giant Records, the album peaked at number 74 on the Billboard Top R&B Albums, her lowest charting album. David Foster and LeMel Humes produced the cover tracks. Official singles were not released, only a radio promo of "Don't Explain" was played on R&B and jazz stations in the U.S.

By 1997, Howard was no longer signed to Giant Records. Her sixth studio album and her first in four years, Can't Count Me Out, was released under a new label, Hush, in May. The album was her first to not chart on the Billboard 200 or the Top R&B/Hip-Hop Albums. The album includes duets, a cover of Stevie Wonder's "I Love Every Little Thing About You" with singer Terence Trent D'Arby, "Can't Count Me Out" duet with father Clay Graham and a remake of Janis Ian's "At Seventeen". LeMel Humes produced most of the album, including a cover of the jazz standard "You Don't Know What Love Is" and "Sunshine" penned by singer Brenda Russell.

=== 2001–2008: Three Wishes, Pillow Talk and Private Collection ===
In March 2001, Howard released her seventh album, Three Wishes under Peak Records. Although no official singles were released, Nobody received radio airplay. The album peaked at number 60 on the Billboard Top R&B/Hip-Hop Albums and number 25 on the Independent Albums chart. All the tracks were produced by new producers, except "Bring Your Loving Home" produced by Howard's close friend LeMel Humes. The album received a nomination for Best Traditional R&B Vocal Album at the 2002 Grammy Awards. After five years had past since Three Wishes, in September 2006 Howard was now signed with Shanachie Records. Her eighth studio album, Pillow Talk was released. The album peaked at number 60 on the Billboard Top R&B/Hip-Hop Albums Chart. All songs were cover tracks of her favorite R&B classic songs, of Ann Peebles, George Benson, Nancy Wilson to Natalie Cole, The Main Ingredient and Boz Scaggs. Howard contributed as the album's producer, along with Kim Waters, Danny Weiss and Chris Davis.

Howard is currently working on regenerating her career after taking some time out to raise her children. She undertook a world tour with Roy Ayers and the Jazz Allstars. In June 2008, she released her ninth studio album, Private Collection under her legally owned new independent label, Branicka Records. The album contained ten tracks, with five new smooth jazz and R&B songs co-written and co-produced with Chuckii Booker, and five jazz standards co-produced with Brandon McCune. Besides Booker, composers included on the album included Hoagy Carmichael and Johnny Mercer for "Skylark", Sammy Fain and Paul-Francis Webster for "Secret Love", Henry Mancini and Johnny Mercer for "Days of Wine and Roses", Elisse Boyd and Murray Grand for "Guess Who I Saw Today", and Irving Berlin for "Counting Your Blessings".

On November 1, 2010, Unsung: Miki Howard was televised on TV One. In February 2011, TV One televised Way Black When which showcased African Americans' impact in entertainment through the 1970s, 1980s and 1990s. Howard was featured during the 1980s segment, hosted by comedian Niecy Nash. Howard performed her number-one R&B hit, "Ain't Nobody Like You". In March she embarked on a U.S. tour, Throwback Unplugged Tour. with Dru Hill, K-Ci & JoJo and Bell Biv DeVoe.

=== 2014-present: I Choose to Be Happy and touring ===
Howard released an EP, I Choose to Be Happy in 2015, which includes four new songs, also the new single "Panther" which features rapper Too Short and some of her greatest hits re-recorded live. "I Choose to Be Happy" will also include a new song, the title track, "I Choose to be Happy" and a tribute to Marvin Gaye titled "Soon I'll Be Loving You Again" which features son Brandon Howard and David Ruffin Jr. While recording, Howard has been touring throughout the U.S. and overseas, performing the album's first single, "Panther" as well as her classic hit songs. On September 25, 2015, Howard released her second live album titled Miki Howard: Live in Concert. The release features her performance of hits throughout her music career, and cover versions of "My Man", "Pillow Talk", "This Bitter Earth", and Marvin Gaye's "Soon I'll Be Loving You Again".

== Discography ==
Studio albums

- Come Share My Love (1986)
- Love Confessions (1987)
- Miki Howard (1989)
- Femme Fatale (1992)
- Miki Sings Billie (1993)
- Can't Count Me Out (1997)
- Three Wishes (2001)
- Pillow Talk (2006)
- Private Collection (2008)
- I Choose to Be Happy (2015)

== Tours ==
- Cameo Tour (1987)
- Levert Tour (1988)
- Al Jarreau Tour (1990)
- Jazz AllStars Tour (2009)
- Throwback Unplugged Tour (2011)

== Films ==
- Malcolm X (1992)
- Poetic Justice (1993)
- Love Under New Management: The Miki Howard Story (2016)

== Awards and nominations ==
=== American Music Awards ===
Year	Nominated work	Award	Result
1991	Miki Howard	Favorite Soul/R&B Female Artist	Nominated

=== Chicago Music Awards ===
Year	Nominated work	Award	Result	Ref
2012	Miki Howard	Lifetime Achievement Award	Won	

=== Grammy Awards ===
Year	Nominated work	Award	Result	Ref
2002	Three Wishes	Best Traditional R&B Performance	Nominated	

=== Soul Train Music Awards ===
Year	Nominated work	Award	Result
1988	Miki Howard	Best New Artist	Won
