= TLC discography =

American R&B group discography

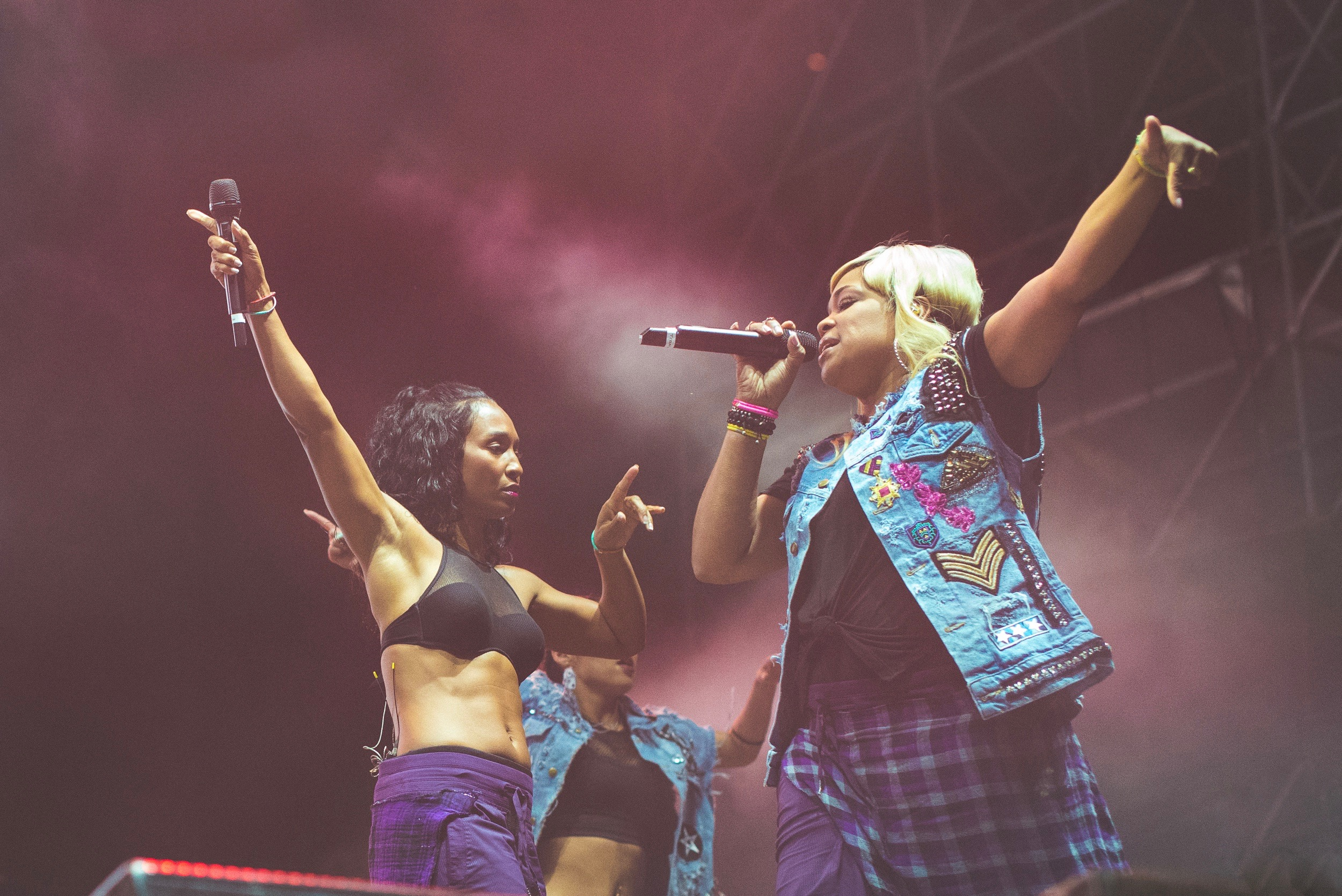
- TLC performing in Toronto in September 2016
- Studio albums: 5
- Compilation albums: 13
- Singles: 25
- Video albums: 6
- Music videos: 24
- Promotional singles: 11

American R&B group TLC has released five studio albums, 13 compilation albums, six video albums, 25 singles (including four as a featured artist), 11 promotional singles, and 24 music videos.

They have attained four number-one singles on the US Billboard Hot 100: "Creep", "Waterfalls", "No Scrubs" and "Unpretty". The group have certified shipping of 23 million albums in the United States (including one certified diamond album) and 11 million singles. In 2008, the group was inducted into the All Time Hot 100 Artist Hall of Fame by Billboard magazine at 56th place.

They have sold over 60 million records worldwide, and is considered one of the best-selling girl groups of all time (second to the Spice Girls).

Their second studio album, CrazySexyCool, has sold 23 million copies worldwide, and is recognized as the best-selling album of all time by a girl group in the United States.

== Albums ==
=== Studio albums ===
List of studio albums, with selected chart positions, sales figures and certifications
Title	Details	Peak chart positions										Sales	Certifications
Title	Details	US	US R&B /HH	AUS	CAN	FRA	GER	NLD	NZ	SWI	UK	Sales	Certifications
Ooooooohhh... On the TLC Tip	Released: February 25, 1992; Label: LaFace; Formats: CD, LP, cassette	14	3	99	35	—	—	—	—	—	—	WW: 6,000,000; US: 2,600,000	RIAA: 4× Platinum; MC: Platinum
CrazySexyCool	Released: November 15, 1994; Label: LaFace, Arista; Formats: CD, LP, cassette	3	2	5	6	40	4	4	1	10	4	WW: 23,000,000; US: 8,970,000 (Note: As of January 2015, CrazySexyCool had sold 7.7 million copies in the United States according to Nielsen SoundScan, which does not count albums sold through clubs like the BMG Music Club, where it had sold 1.27 million copies as of February 2003.)	RIAA: 12× Platinum; ARIA: 2× Platinum; BPI: Platinum; MC: 8× Platinum; NVPI: Gold; RMNZ: Platinum
FanMail	Released: February 23, 1999; Label: LaFace, Arista; Formats: CD, LP, cassette	1	1	15	3	24	7	9	6	11	7	WW: 10,000,000; US: 5,677,000 (Note: As of June 2017, FanMail had sold 4.8 million copies in the United States according to Nielsen SoundScan, which does not count albums sold through clubs like the BMG Music Club, where it had sold 877,000 copies as of February 2003.)	RIAA: 6× Platinum; ARIA: Platinum; BPI: Platinum; IFPI SWI: Gold; MC: 4× Platinum; NVPI: Platinum; RMNZ: Platinum; SNEP: Gold
3D	Released: October 10, 2002; Label: Arista; Formats: CD, LP, cassette	6	4	73	31	101	46	62	45	47	45	US: 693,000	RIAA: Platinum
TLC	Released: June 30, 2017; Label: 852 Musiq; Formats: CD, LP, digital download	38	20	117	—	—	81	—	—	—	40		
"—" denotes a recording that did not chart or was not released in that territory.

=== Compilation albums ===
List of compilation albums, with selected chart positions and certifications
Title	Details	Peak chart positions						Certifications
Title	Details	US	US R&B /HH	AUS	JPN	NZ	UK	Certifications
Now & Forever: The Hits	Released: September 30, 2003; Label: Arista; Formats: CD, cassette	53	22	192	11	33	86	BPI: Silver; RIAJ: Platinum
Artist Collection	Released: September 20, 2004; Label: Arista; Format: CD	—	—	—	—	—	—	
Collections	Released: December 22, 2006; Label: Sony BMG; Format: CD	—	—	—	—	—	—	
The Very Best of TLC: Crazy Sexy Hits	Released: August 20, 2007 (UK only); Label: Sony BMG; Formats: CD, digital download	—	—	—	—	—	57	
The Greatest Hits of TLC	Released: March 24, 2008; Label: Sony BMG; Format: CD	—	—	—	—	—	—	
Steel Box Collection: Greatest Hits	Released: March 13, 2009; Label: Sony; Format: CD	—	—	—	—	—	—	
We Love TLC	Released: March 25, 2009 (Japan only); Label: BMG Japan; Formats: CD, CD+DVD	—	—	—	86	—	—	
Playlist: The Very Best of TLC	Released: June 30, 2009; Label: LaFace, Arista, Legacy; Format: CD	—	—	—	—	—	—	
Super Hits	Released: September 14, 2010; Label: Sony; Format: CD	—	—	—	—	—	—	
12″ Masters: Essential Mixes	Released: September 20, 2010; Label: Sony; Format: CD	—	—	—	—	—	—	
S.O.U.L.	Released: November 21, 2012; Label: Sony; Format: CD	—	—	—	—	—	—	
TLC 20: 20th Anniversary Hits	Released: June 19, 2013 (Japan only); Label: Warner Music Japan; Formats: CD, CD+DVD, digital download	—	—	—	18	—	—	
20	Released: October 15, 2013; Label: Epic, LaFace; Formats: CD, digital download	12	4	—	—	—	—	BPI: Silver
"—" denotes a recording that did not chart or was not released in that territory.

== Singles ==
=== As lead artist ===
List of singles as lead artist, with selected chart positions and certifications, showing year released and album name
Title	Year	Peak chart positions										Certifications	Album
Title	Year	US	US R&B /HH	AUS	FRA	GER	IRE	NLD	NZ	SWI	UK	Certifications	Album
"Ain't 2 Proud 2 Beg"	1991	6	2	28	—	—	—	24	35	—	13	RIAA: Platinum	Ooooooohhh... On the TLC Tip
"Baby-Baby-Baby"	1992	2	1	95	—	—	—	—	—	—	55	RIAA: Platinum	Ooooooohhh... On the TLC Tip
"What About Your Friends"	1992	7	2	79	—	—	—	58	19	—	59	RIAA: Gold	Ooooooohhh... On the TLC Tip
"Hat 2 da Back"	1992	30	14	—	—	—	—	—	22	—	—		Ooooooohhh... On the TLC Tip
"Get It Up"	1993	42	15	168	—	—	—	—	25	—	—		Poetic Justice: Music from the Motion Picture
"Sleigh Ride"	1993	—	—	—	—	—	—	—	—	—	—		Home Alone 2: Lost in New York – Original Soundtrack Album
"Creep"	1994	1	1	20	23	39	9	19	4	26	6 (Note: "Creep" originally reached number 22 on the UK Singles Chart in January 1995. It reached a new peak of number six when remixed and re-released in January 1996.)	RIAA: Platinum; BPI: Gold; RMNZ: Platinum	CrazySexyCool
"Red Light Special"	1995	2	3	53	—	—	—	—	9	—	18	RIAA: Gold; RMNZ: Gold	CrazySexyCool
"Waterfalls"	1995	1	4	4	20	5	4	5	1	1	4	RIAA: Platinum; ARIA: Platinum; BPI: 2× Platinum; BVMI: Gold; RMNZ: 4× Platinum	CrazySexyCool
"Diggin' on You"	1995	5	7	6	—	46	21	32	8	29	18	RIAA: Gold; ARIA: Gold	CrazySexyCool
"No Scrubs"	1999	1	1	1	5	4	1	3	1	5	3	RIAA: 5× Platinum; ARIA: Platinum; BPI: 5× Platinum; BVMI: Gold; RMNZ: 9× Platinum	FanMail
"Unpretty"	1999	1	4	3	32	16	4	8	3	9	6	RIAA: Gold; ARIA: Platinum; BPI: Silver; RMNZ: Platinum	FanMail
"Dear Lie"	2000	51	70	35	40	37	12	26	10	29	31		FanMail
"Girl Talk"	2002	28	23	46	—	79	—	54	18	96	30		3D
"Hands Up"	2002	— (Note: "Hands Up" did not enter the Billboard Hot 100, but peaked at number 18 on the Hot Singles Sales chart.)	— (Note: "Hands Up" did not enter the Hot R&B/Hip-Hop Songs chart, but peaked at number seven on the Bubbling Under R&B/Hip-Hop Singles chart.)	—	—	—	—	—	—	—	109		3D
"Damaged"	2003	53	—	—	—	—	—	—	21	—	—		3D
"Come Get Some" (featuring Lil Jon and Sean P)	2004	—	81	—	—	—	—	—	—	—	—		Now & Forever: The Hits
"I Bet" (featuring O'so Krispie)	2005	—	—	—	—	—	—	—	—	—	—		Now & Forever: The Hits
"Gift Wrapped Kiss"	2014	—	—	—	—	—	—	—	—	—	—		Non-album single
"Haters"	2016	—	—	—	—	—	—	—	—	—	—		TLC
"Joy Ride"	2016	—	—	—	—	—	—	—	—	—	—		TLC
"Way Back" (featuring Snoop Dogg)	2017	—	— (Note: "Way Back" did not enter the Hot R&B/Hip-Hop Songs chart, but peaked at number 35 on the Hot R&B/Hip-Hop Airplay chart and at number eight on the Adult R&B Songs chart.)	—	—	—	—	—	—	—	—		TLC
"—" denotes a recording that did not chart or was not released in that territory.

=== As featured artist ===
List of singles as featured artist, with selected chart positions, showing year released and album name
Title	Year	Peak chart positions				Certifications	Album
Title	Year	US	US R&B /HH	UK	UK R&B	Certifications	Album
"Freedom (Theme from Panther)" (with various artists)	1995	45	18	—	—		Panther: The Original Motion Picture Soundtrack
"What It Ain't (Ghetto Enuff)" (Goodie Mob featuring TLC)	2000	—	— (Note: "What It Ain't (Ghetto Enuff)" did not enter the Hot R&B/Hip-Hop Songs chart, but peaked at number three on the Bubbling Under R&B/Hip-Hop Singles chart.)	—	—		World Party
"Voice of Love" (as part of Voice of Love Posse)	2004	—	—	—	—		Non-album single
"Crooked Smile" (J. Cole featuring TLC)	2013	27	7	114	22	RIAA: Platinum; BPI: Silver; RMNZ: 2× Platinum	Born Sinner
"DO IT! (AGAIN!)" (Kaytranada featuring TLC)	2025	—	—	—	—		Ain't No Damn Way!
"—" denotes a recording that did not chart or was not released in that territory.

=== Promotional singles ===
List of promotional singles, with selected chart positions, showing year released and album name
Title	Year	Peak chart positions		Album
Title	Year	US	US R&B /HH	Album
"Kick Your Game"	1995	—	— (Note: "Kick Your Game" did not enter the Hot R&B/Hip-Hop Songs chart, but peaked at number 69 on the Hot R&B/Hip-Hop Airplay chart.)	CrazySexyCool
"This Is How It Works"	1996	—	— (Note: "This Is How It Works" did not enter the Hot R&B/Hip-Hop Songs chart, but peaked at number 60 on the Hot R&B/Hip-Hop Airplay chart.)	Waiting to Exhale: Original Soundtrack Album
"Silly Ho"	1998	59	21	FanMail
"I'm Good at Being Bad"	1999	—	38	FanMail
"FanMail"	1999	—	—	FanMail
"My Life"	1999	—	—	FanMail
"I Need That"	1999	—	—	Non-album single
"3D"	2002	—	—	3D
"Dirty Dirty"	2002	—	—	3D
"American Gold"	2017	—	—	TLC
"It's Sunny"	2017	—	—	TLC
"—" denotes a recording that did not chart or was not released in that territory.

== Other charted songs ==
List of other charted songs, with selected chart positions, showing year released and album name
Title	Year	Peaks	Album
Title	Year	US R&B /HH Airplay	Album
"Switch"	1995	56	CrazySexyCool

== Guest appearances ==
List of non-single guest appearances, with other performing artists, showing year released and album name
Title	Year	Other artist(s)	Album
"Reversal of a Dog"	1992	Damian Dame, Highland Place Mobsters, Toni Braxton	Boomerang: Original Soundtrack Album
"All I Want for Christmas"	1993	None	A LaFace Family Christmas
"All That Theme Song"	1996	None	All That: The Album
"All That – Outro Theme Song"	1996	None	All That: The Album
"What's Going On" (Dupri R&B Mix)	2001	Artists Against AIDS Worldwide	"What's Going On" (single)
"What's Going On" (Mick Guzauski's Pop Mix)	2001	Artists Against AIDS Worldwide	"What's Going On" (single)
"Can You Hear Me"	2002	Missy Elliott	Under Construction
"Rainbow"	2012	None	L'Arc-en-Ciel Tribute

== Videography ==
=== Video albums ===
List of video albums, with chart positions and certifications
Title	Details	Peaks		Certifications	Notes
Title	Details	US	JPN	Certifications	Notes
Oooooooohhh... On the Video Tip	Released: August 29, 1992; Label: LaFace; Format: VHS	7	—		Features interviews and behind-the-scenes footage.; Contains the music videos for "Ain't 2 Proud 2 Beg", "Baby-Baby-Baby", and "What About Your Friends".
CrazyVideoCool	Released: November 7, 1995; Label: 6 West Home Video, BMG Video; Formats: LaserDisc, VHS, VCD	5	—	RIAA: Gold	Features interviews, as well as behind-the-scenes footage at video shoots.; Contains the music videos for "Creep", "Red Light Special", "Waterfalls", and "Diggin' on You".
Hands Up/Girl Talk	Released: April 15, 2003; Label: Arista; Format: DVD	26	—	RIAA: Gold	Contains the music videos for "Hands Up" and "Girl Talk".
Now & Forever: The Video Hits	Released: December 10, 2003; Label: Arista; Format: DVD	—	37		Released to coincide with Now & Forever: The Hits.; Contains all the music videos for the singles that reached the top 10 of the Billboard charts.
Artist Collection	Released: September 20, 2004; Label: Arista; Format: DVD	—	—		Contains the music videos for "Creep", "Red Light Special", "Waterfalls", "No Scrubs", and "Unpretty".
The Greatest Hits Video Collection	Released: December 7, 2005; Label: BMG Japan; Format: DVD	—	—		Released exclusively in Japan.; Contains all music videos from TLC's first four studio albums.
"—" denotes a recording that did not chart or was not released in that territory.

=== Music videos ===
List of music videos, showing year released and directors
Title	Year	Director(s)	Ref.
"Ain't 2 Proud 2 Beg"	1992	Lionel C. Martin	
"Baby-Baby-Baby"	1992	Keith Ward	
"What About Your Friends"	1992	Lionel C. Martin	
"Hat 2 da Back"	1992	Phelim Dolan	
"Get It Up"	1993	Lionel C. Martin	
"Sleigh Ride"	1993	Lionel C. Martin	
"Creep" (Note: A second version of the music video for "Creep" was directed by Craig Henry, but was never released.)	1994	Matthew Rolston	
"Red Light Special" (Note: The music video for "Red Light Special" was available in three versions: "sexy", "sexier" and "sexiest".)	1995	Matthew Rolston	
"Waterfalls"	1995	F. Gary Gray	
"Diggin' on You"	1995	F. Gary Gray	
"Freedom (Theme from Panther)" (with various artists)	1995	Antoine Fuqua	
"No Scrubs"	1999	Hype Williams	
"Unpretty"	1999	Paul Hunter	
"Dear Lie"	2000	Bille Woodruff	
"What It Ain't" (Goodie Mob featuring TLC)	2000	Dave Meyers	
"Girl Talk"	2002	Dave Meyers	
"Turntable" (compilation of clips)	2002	Tommy Martin	
"Hands Up"	2003	Matthew Rolston	
"Damaged"	2003	Joseph Kahn	
"Voice of Love" (as part of Voice of Love Posse)	2004	Unknown	
"Crooked Smile" (Note: TLC do not appear in the music video for "Crooked Smile", but their vocals on the track are included in the video.) (J. Cole featuring TLC)	2013	Sheldon Candis	
"Meant to Be" (Note: The music video for "Meant to Be" appears at the end of the television film CrazySexyCool: The TLC Story.)	2013	Unknown	
"Way Back" (featuring Snoop Dogg)	2017	LCR$	
"Haters"	2017	LCR$	
