= The Very Best of TLC: Crazy Sexy Hits =

Greatest hits album by TLC
- Released: August 20, 2007
- Genre: Pop; hip hop; R&B
- Length: 62:14
- Label: Sony BMG
- Producer: Dallas Austin; Kevin "She'kspere" Briggs; Kenneth "Babyface" Edmonds; Eddie Hustle; The Neptunes; Organized Noize; Antonio "L.A." Reid; Daryl Simmons; Jonathan "Lil Jon" Smith

TLC chronology
Now & Forever: The Hits (2003)	The Very Best of TLC: Crazy Sexy Hits (2007)	20 (2013)

The Very Best of TLC: Crazy Sexy Hits (released digitally as The Best of TLC) is the second greatest hits album by American girl group TLC. It was released exclusively in the United Kingdom on August 20, 2007, by Sony BMG. Having a similar track listing to that of the group's first compilation, Now & Forever: The Hits (2003), the album contains TLC's most successful singles from four of their studio albums, which have been credited to many of the group's producers such as Dallas Austin and Kenneth "Babyface" Edmonds.

The album received mostly positive reaction from music critics, with many expressing admiration for the compilation. However, the album was a commercial disappointment, peaking at number 57 on the UK Albums Chart. This position, however, was higher than Now & Forever: The Hits's performance in the past. In 2013, the album, along with most of their other compilations, were removed from the iTunes Store after the release of their latest greatest hits collection 20.

== Background and release ==
TLC's exclusive greatest hits album for the United Kingdom market was first announced in June 2007 with the planned title Crazy Sexy Hits, a play on the title of their second studio album, CrazySexyCool (1994). This compilation is the group's third to be released in the country after Now & Forever: The Hits (2003) and Artist Collection (2004), the first of which was certified Silver in the country while the latter failed to chart anywhere. On August 20, 2007, Sony BMG, head of the group's former LaFace and Arista Records, released the compilation fully titled The Very Best of TLC: Crazy Sexy Hits. This name was later listed by Radio.com's contributor Jeremy D. Larson as the thirty-second "cutest" title for any greatest hits album.

On August 13, a week prior to the compilation's release, TLC's 2003 video album Now & Forever: The Video Hits was re-packaged and reissued to match the album's appearance. The DVD includes 10 music videos, behind-the-scenes footage and a photo gallery. Its cover had also been re-designed to coincide with the compilation's, in which both feature close-up shots of the members with their faces painted in blue metallic tones, cropped from a full picture originally taken by French-American photographer Seb Janiak for their single cover of "No Scrubs" and for their third studio album FanMail (1999).

Amongst the promotion of the compilation, a 30-second televised advert was also conducted by the label with a contest organized by Black British women's magazine Precious, giving free copies of the CD to their readers. For some alternative digital releases, the album's title was changed to The Best of TLC before itself and all of the group's previous compilations—except Now & Forever: The Hits—were deleted from iTunes Store to focus on their latest major greatest hits project 20 in 2013.

== Material ==
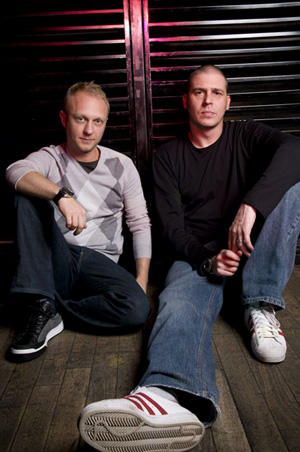
A remix of "Creep" from British duo The Shapeshifters was supposed to appear on the album's digital version; however, it was scrapped

The Very Best of TLC: Crazy Sexy Hits's material is taken from four of their studio albums: Ooooooohhh... On the TLC Tip (1992), CrazySexyCool (1994), FanMail (1999), and 3D (2002), and Now & Forever: The Hits (2003), which were all recorded from 1991 to 2003. Their 1993 cover of The Time's "Get It Up" for the soundtrack to Poetic Justice does not appear on any of their studio albums, but still appears on the compilation along with the trio's most successful singles in the United Kingdom. These include "No Scrubs", which placed at number three on the UK Singles Chart and was awarded a platinum certification from the British Phonographic Industry (BPI); "Waterfalls", which peaked at number four on the UK Singles Chart and also achieved platinum status; "Unpretty", a silver-certificated single which peaked at number six on the UK Singles Chart, and "Creep", which also peaked at number six on the UK Singles Chart after being reissued across the UK and Europe. It did not, however, include "Dear Lie", a moderately received UK single which was certified silver. Instead, the non-charting songs "Come Get Some", "Damaged" and "Get It Up" were included in the final track listing, with "Whoop De Woo" (a non-album track) and "In Your Arms Tonight" (from 3D) the only two non-single tracks that appeared the compilation.

During the time of the release's announcement, PopJustice reported that Sony BMG were producing remixes to accompany the album. So for their consideration, the website wrote an "open letter" to the label's A&R suggesting the album should have a remix done by British DJ duo Freemasons, attached with a link to the two's mix of Beyoncé and Shakira's "Beautiful Liar". The label instead intended to feature a remix of "Creep" from another British production duo, The Shapeshifters, but the idea was eventually scrapped. (Note: "Creep (Shapeshifters Mix)" was named in a few online tracklists but it didn't appear on the final release. Also, Shapeshifters is not to be confused with American underground hip hop group The Shape Shifters, who have their name stylized as "The Shape Shifters", not "Shapeshifters". Furthermore, the British duo had done two remixes for Sony BMG in 2007, the same year of the album's release.) Differing from its CD release, the digital version of the album contains four other bonus tracks: "Turntable", "Kick Your Game", "Silly Ho" and "Hat 2 da Back". With these additions, this version is eventually a re-arrangement of Now & Forever: The Hits's standard physical edition. Many music producers contributed to the collection, with names spanning from Kenneth "Babyface" Edmonds, Kevin "She'kspere" Briggs, Organized Noize, The Neptunes, Rodney "Darkchild" Jerkins, Jermaine Dupri, and Daryl Simmons, to the group's frequent collaborator Dallas Austin, who received credit on nine of the nineteen songs on the digital version.

== Critical reception ==
Professional ratings
Review scores
Source	Rating
AllMusic	4/5 stars
News Shopper	4/5 stars
The Daily Express	3/5 stars

Writing his review for online music guide AllMusic, author Andy Kellman gave the compilation four out of five stars while pointing out "In Your Arms Tonight", "Come Get Some" and "Whoop De Woo" as a couple of "smart picks" that weren't big hits on the album. However, Kellman still preferred them to other better songs from studio releases. For a conclusion, the writer compared the album to Now & Forever: The Hits as "a little [less] thorough", but still, it was a "fine substitute." British newspaper Daily Express gave the album three stars with a mixed review, stating: "Back in the Nineties, TLC were one of the biggest girl groups in the world, although listening to this best-of collection, it's not always easy to understand why." The critic observed that besides a handful of "brilliant" works like "No Scrubs", "Waterfalls" and "Unpretty", the trio also "churned out some pretty forgettable, bog-standard R&B." Also from England, Robert Fisk from local publication News Shopper disagreed, giving the greatest hits a four-star review and claimed that first-time listeners can "easily possible" enjoy the album without any knowledge of the back story. However, Fisk harshly criticized "Come Get Some" as the compilation's "only real negative" due to it being a "male rap-heavy" track, against the trio's usual lyrics dealing with female empowerment and "being equal to, if not stronger than, the men in their lives." In the end, the reviewer still gave out a praise for the album: "Crazy Sexy Hits is both a classic blend of R&B, hip hop and dance for those keen to rediscover the band as well as being a perfect place for anyone starting their TLC collection, working back one record at a time."

== Commercial performance ==
The album debuted at number 57 on the UK Albums Chart of August 26, 2007. The following week, the compilation dropped to number 107 before falling to number 192 and disappeared from the chart after staying for three weeks. Its peak, however, outperformed Now & Forever: The Hits's peak at number 86 back in 2003.

== Track listing ==
No.	Title	Writer(s)	Producer(s)	Length
1.	"No Scrubs"	Kevin Briggs; Kandi Burruss; Tameka Cottle; Lisa "Left Eye" Lopes	She'kspere	3:39
2.	"Waterfalls"	Marqueze Etheridge; Lopes; Organized Noize	Organized Noize	4:19
3.	"Creep"	Dallas Austin	Austin	4:28
4.	"Red Light Special"	Babyface	Babyface	4:40
5.	"Diggin' on You"	Babyface	Babyface	4:14
6.	"Baby-Baby-Baby"	L.A. Reid; Daryl Simmons; Babyface	Reid; Simmons; Babyface	4:05
7.	"Come Get Some" (featuring Lil Jon and Sean Paul of YoungBloodz)	Jonathan Smith; Tionne "T-Boz" Watkins; Chilli; Burruss; Craig Love; Sean Paul Joseph	Lil Jon	4:21
8.	"Girl Talk"	Edmund Clement; Burruss; Lopes; Anita McLoud; Watkins	Eddie Hustle	5:19
9.	"Damaged"	Dallas Austin; Watkins	Austin	3:51
10.	"Whoop De Woo"	Austin; Burruss; Lopes	Austin	3:52
11.	"In Your Arms Tonight"	Pharrell Williams	The Neptunes	4:27
12.	"Get It Up"	Prince; Lopes^{[a]}	Tim & Bob^{[a]}; Austin	4:14
13.	"What About Your Friends"	Austin; Lopes	Austin	4:06
14.	"Ain't 2 Proud 2 Beg"	Austin; Lopes	Austin	4:11
15.	"Unpretty"	Austin; Watkins	Austin	4:05
Total length:				62:14

Digital download bonus tracks
No.	Title	Writer(s)	Producer(s)	Length
16.	"Turntable"	Rodney "Darkchild" Jerkins; Watkins; Fred Jerkins III; Daniel Moore; LaShawn Daniels; Tomi Martin	Jerkins	3:25
17.	"Kick Your Game"	Jermaine Dupri; Manuel Seal; Lopes	Dupri; Seal	4:14
18.	"Silly Ho"	Austin	Cyptron	4:15
19.	"Hat 2 da Back"	Austin; Lopes; Kevin Wales	Austin	4:16

Notes

- ^{^[a]} signifies uncredited producers

== Personnel ==
Credits adapted from the liner notes of The Very Best of TLC: Crazy Sexy Hits.

- Tionne "T-Boz" Watkins – vocals
- Lisa "Left Eye" Lopes – vocals
- Rozonda "Chilli" Thomas – vocals
- Lil Jon – vocals, production (track 7)
- Sean Paul – vocals (track 7)
- Kevin "She'kspere" Briggs – production (track 1)
- Organized Noize – production (track 7)
- Dallas Austin – production (track 3, 9, 10, 12, 13, 14 & 15)
- Kenneth "Babyface" Edmonds – production (track 4, 5, 6)
- Antonio "L.A." Reid – production (track 6)
- Daryl Simmons – production (track 6)
- Eddie Hustle – production (track 8)
- The Neptunes – production (track 11)
- Tim Kelley – production (track 12)
- Bob Robinson – production (track 12)

== Charts ==
Chart (2007)	Peak position
Scottish Albums (OCC)	68
UK Albums (OCC)	57
UK R&B Albums (OCC)	15
