= Now & Forever: The Hits =

2003 album by TLC

Greatest hits album by TLC
- Released: September 30, 2003
- Recorded: 1991–2003
- Length: 77:44
- Label: Arista
- Producer: Dallas Austin; Babyface; Kevin "She'kspere" Briggs; Cyptron; Jermaine Dupri; Eddie Hustle; Rodney Jerkins; the Neptunes; Organized Noize; L.A. Reid; Daryl Simmons; Jonathan "Lil Jon" Smith; Tim & Bob

TLC chronology
3D (2002)	Now & Forever: The Hits (2003)	The Very Best of TLC: Crazy Sexy Hits (2007)

Singles from Now & Forever: The Hits
- 1. "Come Get Some" Released: November 17, 2003

Professional ratings
Review scores
Source	Rating
AllMusic	4.5/5 stars

Now & Forever: The Hits is the first greatest hits album by American girl group TLC. It was released by Arista Records on September 30, 2003, in Japan, on November 24, 2003, in the United Kingdom and on June 21, 2005, in North America. It was initially meant to be titled Still Crazy...Always Sexy...Forever Cool and was planned for a November 25, 2003 release in the United States.

The album comprises nearly all of their singles (excluding "Hands Up" and "Dear Lie") released between 1991 and 2003. Most of the tracks on the album are radio edits in order to fit all of the songs into one disc. The compilation contains one new song, "Come Get Some", which features Lil Jon and Sean Paul of YoungBloodz. The song "Whoop De Woo" was a leftover track from the 3D recording sessions. In September 2005, the album was reissued digitally to include "I Bet", the single which featured winner O'so Krispie from TLC's UPN reality television series R U the Girl.

The album debuted to number 53 on the Billboard 200, selling approximately 26,000 copies in its first. It briefly reentered the Billboard 200 at number 169 in November 2013 following the premiere of the group's biopic CrazySexyCool: The TLC Story on VH1.

== Track listing ==
Standard edition
No.	Title	Writer(s)	Producer(s)	Length
1.	"Ain't 2 Proud 2 Beg" (U.S. 7" edit, from Ooooooohhh... On the TLC Tip, 1992)	Dallas Austin; Lisa "Left Eye" Lopes; Robert Bell; Claydes Smith; Robert Mickens; Donald Boyce; Richard Westfield; Dennis Thomas; Ronald Bell; George Brown; Hamish Stuart; Owen McIntyre; Alan Gorrie; Stephen Ferrone; Malcolm Duncan; Roger Ball	Austin	4:08
2.	"What About Your Friends" (radio edit w/ rap, from Ooooooohhh... On the TLC Tip, 1992)	Austin; Lopes	Austin	4:04
3.	"Hat 2 da Back" (album version edit, from Ooooooohhh... On the TLC Tip, 1992)	Austin; Lopes; Kevin Wales	Austin	4:07
4.	"Get It Up" (radio mix, from Poetic Justice: Music from the Motion Picture, 1993)	Prince	Austin; Tim & Bob	4:14
5.	"Baby-Baby-Baby" (radio edit, from Ooooooohhh... On the TLC Tip, 1992)	L.A. Reid; Babyface; Daryl Simmons	Reid; Babyface; Simmons	3:58
6.	"Creep" (from CrazySexyCool, 1994)	Austin	Austin	4:26
7.	"Red Light Special" (radio edit, from CrazySexyCool, 1994)	Babyface	Babyface	4:37
8.	"Waterfalls" (single edit, from CrazySexyCool, 1994)	Marqueze Etheridge; Lopes; Organized Noize	Organized Noize	4:18
9.	"Diggin' on You" (from CrazySexyCool, 1994)	Babyface	Babyface	4:14
10.	"Kick Your Game" (from CrazySexyCool, 1994)	Jermaine Dupri; Manuel Seal; Lopes	Dupri; Seal^{[a]}	4:14
11.	"Silly Ho" (from FanMail, 1999)	Austin	Cyptron	4:15
12.	"No Scrubs" (rap version, from FanMail, 1999)	Kevin Briggs; Kandi Burruss; Tameka Cottle; Lopes	Kevin "She'kspere" Briggs	3:38
13.	"Unpretty" (radio version, from FanMail, 1999)	Austin; Tionne "T-Boz" Watkins	Austin	4:00
14.	"Come Get Some" (featuring Lil Jon and Sean Paul of YoungbloodZ, previously unreleased, 2003)	Jonathan Smith; Watkins; Chilli; Burruss; Craig Love; Sean Paul Joseph	Jonathan "Lil Jon" Smith	4:19
15.	"Girl Talk" (alternate mix, from 3D, 2002)	Edmund Clement; Burruss; Lopes; Anita McCloud; Watkins	Eddie Hustle	3:35
16.	"Damaged" (alternate mix, from 3D, 2002)	Austin; Watkins	Austin	3:52
17.	"Whoop De Woo" (previously unreleased, 2002)	Austin; Burruss; Lopes	Austin	3:52
18.	"In Your Arms Tonight" (from 3D, 2002)	Pharrell Williams	The Neptunes	4:29
19.	"Turntable" (from 3D, 2002)	Rodney Jerkins; Watkins; Fred Jerkins; Daniel Moore; LaShawn Daniels; Tomi Martin	R. Jerkins	3:24
Total length:				77:44

2005 digital reissue bonus track
No.	Title	Writer(s)	Producer(s)	Length
20.	"I Bet" (featuring O'so Krispie, previously unreleased, 2005)	Richard Butler; Melvin Coleman; Chilli; Watkins; O'so Krispie (uncredited)	Coleman	3:21
Total length:				81:05

UK edition bonus DVD
No.	Title	Director	Length
1.	"Ain't 2 Proud 2 Beg"	Lionel C. Martin	4:18
2.	"Waterfalls"	F. Gary Gray	5:20
3.	"Creep"	Matthew Rolston	4:25
4.	"No Scrubs"	Hype Williams	4:10
5.	"Unpretty"	Paul Hunter	6:11

Japanese edition bonus disc
No.	Title	Length
1.	"Ain't 2 Proud 2 Beg" (Dallas dirt mix)	5:33
2.	"What About Your Friends" (extended remix featuring Outkast)	5:58
3.	"Creep" (Jermaine's jeep mix)	5:13
4.	"Red Light Special" (Gerald Hall's remix)	5:13
5.	"Waterfalls" (ONP remix)	4:38
6.	"Diggin' on You" (LA's live remix)	4:41
7.	"Unpretty" (Don't Look Any Further remix)	4:25

=== Notes ===
- ^{^[a]} signifies a co-producer

=== Sample credits ===
- "Ain't 2 Proud 2 Beg" contains samples of "Escape-ism" by James Brown, "Jungle Boogie" by Kool & the Gang and "School Boy Crush" by Average White Band.
- "Hat 2 da Back" contains samples of "Big Ole Butt" by LL Cool J and "What Makes You Happy" by KC and the Sunshine Band.
- "Creep" contains a sample of "Hey Young World" by Slick Rick.

== Personnel ==
Credits adapted from the liner notes of Now & Forever: The Hits.

=== Musicians ===
- Dallas Austin – arrangement (tracks 1–3, 11, 13, 16, 17)
- Lisa "Left Eye" Lopes – rap (track 12)
- Craig Love – guitar (track 14)

=== Technical ===
- Dallas Austin – production (tracks 1–4, 6, 13, 16, 17)
- Tim & Bob – production (track 4)
- L.A. Reid – production (track 5); executive production
- Babyface – production (tracks 5, 7, 9)
- Daryl Simmons – production (track 5)
- Organized Noize – production (track 8)
- Jermaine Dupri – production, remix (track 10)
- Manuel Seal – co-production (track 10)
- Cyptron – production (track 11)
- Kevin "She'kspere" Briggs – production (track 12)
- Jonathan "Lil Jon" Smith – production, mixing (track 14)
- Mark "Exit" Goodchild – recording (track 14)
- John Frye – recording, mixing (track 14)
- Sam Thomas – recording (track 14)
- Delicia Hassan – production coordination (track 14)
- Eddie Hustle – production (track 15)
- The Neptunes – production (track 18)
- Rodney Jerkins – production, vocal production (track 19)
- TLC – executive production
- Herb Powers Jr. – mastering

=== Artwork ===
- Courtney Walter – art direction, design
- Jack Chuck – cover photography
- Dah Len, Seb Janiak, Michael Lavine, Arnold Turner, Sheryl Nields – photography
- Shahid Ali – inside illustration

== Charts ==
Chart (2003–2005)	Peak position
Australian Albums (ARIA)	192
Canadian R&B Albums (Nielsen SoundScan)	23
Irish Albums (IRMA)	72
Japanese Albums (Oricon)	11
New Zealand Albums (RMNZ)	33
UK Albums (OCC)	86
UK R&B Albums (OCC)	28
US Billboard 200	53
US Top R&B/Hip-Hop Albums (Billboard)	22

== Certifications ==
Region	Certification	Certified units/sales
Japan (RIAJ)	Platinum	250,000^{^}
United Kingdom (BPI)	Silver	60,000^{^}
^{^} Shipments figures based on certification alone.

== Now & Forever: The Video Hits ==
Now & Forever: The Video Hits

Video by TLC
- Released: December 10, 2003
- Recorded: 1992–2002
- Label: Arista
- Director: F. Gary Gray; Paul Hunter; Dave Meyers; Lionel C. Martin; Pebbles; Matthew Rolston; Hype Williams; Keith Ward

TLC video chronology
CrazyVideoCool (1996)	Now & Forever: The Video Hits (2003)

Alternative cover
- UK cover

Now & Forever: The Video Hits is a music video compilation containing TLC's music videos from 1992 to 2002. It was released on DVD in Japan in 2003 and in Australia in 2004 by Arista Records with the same track listing, cover and inside booklet. The compilation was eventually released on August 20, 2007, in the United Kingdom to coincide with the release of the group's second compilation album, Crazy Sexy Hits: The Very Best of TLC.

=== Track listing ===
No.	Title	Director(s)	Length
1.	"Ain't 2 Proud 2 Beg"	Lionel C. Martin	4:18
2.	"Baby-Baby-Baby"	Keith Ward; Pebbles	4:13
3.	"What About Your Friends"	Martin	4:36
4.	"Creep"	Matthew Rolston	4:25
5.	"Red Light Special"	Rolston	4:30
6.	"Waterfalls"	F. Gary Gray	5:20
7.	"Diggin' on You"	Gray	5:17
8.	"No Scrubs"	Hype Williams	4:10
9.	"Unpretty"	Paul Hunter	5:11
10.	"Girl Talk"	Dave Meyers	3:50

=== Special features ===
- Behind-the-scenes footage
- Photo gallery
- Dolby Digital 5.1 Sound

=== Charts ===
Chart (2003)	Peak position
Japanese Music DVD (Oricon)	37

=== Release history ===
Region	Date
Japan	December 10, 2003
Australia	March 24, 2004
United States	May 15, 2007
United Kingdom	August 20, 2007
