= I Love the '90s =

I Love the '90s may refer to:

- I Love the '90s (British TV series), a 2001 BBC series examining the pop culture of the decade
- I Love the '90s (American TV series), a 2004 VH1 series based on the British series
- I Love the '90s: Part Deux, a 2005 follow-up to the VH1 series
- I Love the 90s: The Party Continues Tour, a 2017 North American concert tour
