= TLC (group) =

American girl group

- TLC in a 1999 promotional photo for "Unpretty". From left: Rozonda "Chilli" Thomas, Tionne "T-Boz" Watkins, Lisa "Left Eye" Lopes

Background information
- Also known as: TLC-Skee; 2nd Nature
- Origin: Atlanta, Georgia, U.S.
- Genres: R&B; pop; hip-hop; new jack swing
- Works: TLC discography
- Years active: 1990–present
- Labels: LaFace; Arista; Epic; 852
- Spinoff of: Dungeon Family
- Members: Tionne "T-Boz" Watkins; Rozonda "Chilli" Thomas
- Past members: Lisa "Left Eye" Lopes; Crystal Jones
- Website: theofficialtlc.com

TLC is an American girl group formed in 1990 in Atlanta, Georgia. The group's best-known line-up was composed of Tionne "T-Boz" Watkins, Lisa "Left Eye" Lopes, and Rozonda "Chilli" Thomas. The group enjoyed success during the 1990s, with nine top-ten hits on the Billboard Hot 100, including four number-one singles: "Creep", "Waterfalls", "No Scrubs", and "Unpretty". TLC also recorded four multi-platinum albums, including CrazySexyCool (1994), which received a diamond certification from the Recording Industry Association of America (RIAA). They became the first R&B group in history to receive the million certification from the Recording Industry Association of Japan (RIAJ) for FanMail (1999).

Having sold over 60 million records worldwide, TLC is one of the five best-selling American girl groups of all time. VH1 ranked TLC as the greatest female group, placing them at number 12 among the 100 Greatest Women in Music. Billboard magazine ranked TLC as one of the greatest musical trios, as well as the seventh-most-successful act of the 1990s. The group's accolades include five career Grammy Awards, five MTV Video Music Awards, and five Soul Train Music Awards.

Twenty years after their debut, TLC received the Outstanding Contribution to Music award at the 17th MOBO Awards and the Legend Award at the 2013 MTV Video Music Awards Japan. After Lopes' death in 2002, instead of replacing her, the remaining members chose to continue as a duo. In 2017, they released their eponymous fifth album TLC. In 2022, the group was inducted into the Black Music & Entertainment Walk of Fame.

== History ==
=== 1990–1991: Formation and early years ===
Record producer Ian Burke, based in Atlanta, and one of his clients, a teenager Crystal Jones came up with a concept for a girl group with a tomboyish, hip-hop image, similar to the blend of contemporary R&B and hip-hop music of new jack swing act Bell Biv DeVoe in 1990. Jones put out a call for two more girls to join her, eventually answered by Tionne Watkins, a native of Des Moines, Iowa who had moved to Atlanta with her family at a young age, and Lisa Lopes, a rapper who had just moved to the city from her native Philadelphia with a small keyboard and $750 ($1,848 today). The group, then named "2nd Nature", was formed with Jones, Watkins, and Lopes, who then began working with producers Jermaine Dupri and Rico Wade on demo tape material.

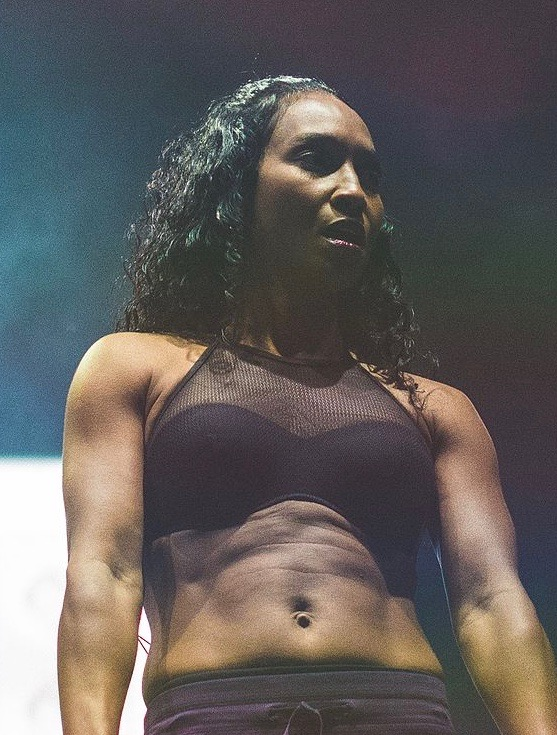
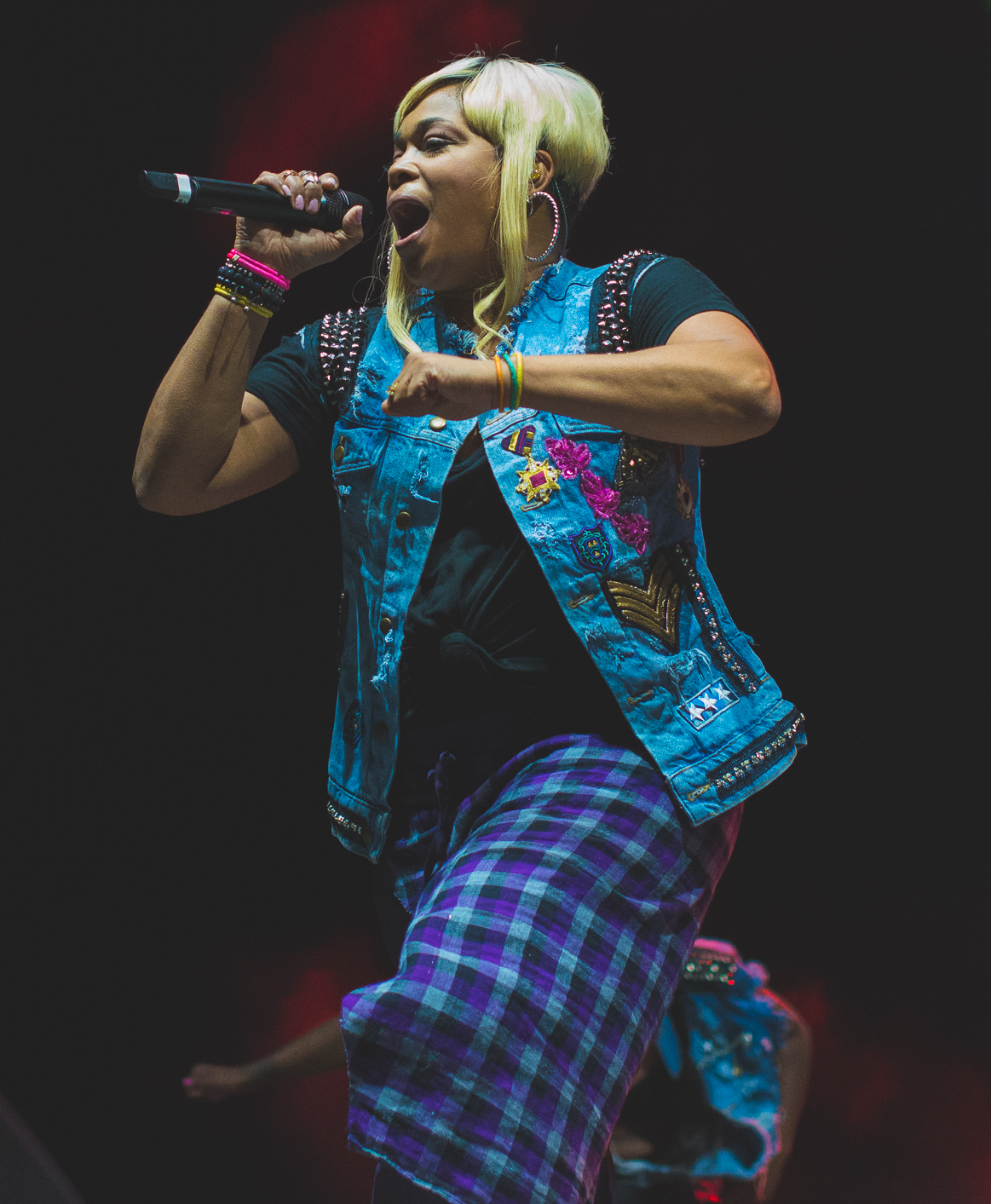
TLC members Rozonda "Chilli" Thomas (left), Tionne "T-Boz" Watkins (right) performing in Toronto, September 2016

Through a connection at the hair salon where Watkins worked, the group eventually managed to arrange an audition with singer Perri "Pebbles" Reid, who had started her own management and production company, Pebbitone. Impressed by the girls, Reid renamed the group TLC, an initialism for the names Tionne, Lisa, and Crystal. Reid arranged an audition for them with local record label LaFace Records, run by Kenneth "Babyface" Edmonds and Reid's then-husband, Antonio "L.A." Reid.

Antonio Reid saw potential in Watkins and Lopes as performers, but felt that Jones should be replaced. According to Jones, things began to unravel for her after Pebbles denied the group the opportunity to take home the contracts that Pebbitone had drafted. Jones did not want to sign before having the contract reviewed by others and perhaps a lawyer. In contrast, Watkins's recollection of Jones's departure is that both she and Lopes asked Jones to leave the group before their initial contracts were negotiated.

On February 28, 1991, Watkins and Lopes signed production, management, and publishing deals with Pebbitone, with Perri Reid becoming their general manager. As they looked for a replacement for Jones, the two-member TLC made its first recorded appearance on a track for LaFace act Damian Dame's self-titled 1991 LP. Pebbles found the third member in Rozonda Thomas, one of Damian Dame's part-time backup dancers.

Thomas was signed to the act in April 1991, and to maintain TLC's name as an acronym for the girls' names, Watkins became "T-Boz", Lopes became "Left-Eye", and Thomas became "Chilli". The girls were then signed to LaFace in May through the production deal with Pebbitone; their records would be distributed by Arista Records/BMG. TLC was immediately set up to go into the studio with Reid and Edmonds, Dallas Austin, Jermaine Dupri, and Marley Marl producing their first album. The new trio debuted as backing vocalists on "Rebel (With a Cause)", a track on Jermaine Jackson's sole album for LaFace, You Said (1991).

=== 1991–1994: Ooooooohhh... On the TLC Tip and early success ===
Their debut album, Ooooooohhh... On the TLC Tip, was released on February 25, 1992, by LaFace/Arista Records. The songs on the album are a blend of funk (Watkins), hip-hop (Lopes), and R&B (Thomas), similar to the new jack-swing sound popularized by producer Teddy Riley in the late 1980s. The album was a critical and commercial success, being certified quadruple-platinum for shipments of four million copies in the United States. It scored three top-ten singles on the Billboard Hot 100 with "Ain't 2 Proud 2 Beg", "Baby-Baby-Baby" (peaked at number two), and "What About Your Friends", as well as the top 30 single "Hat 2 da Back". Observers coined the term "new jill swing" to describe the album and the group. Later, TLC's sound evolved from the genre, but not before opening the door for similar groups such as SWV, Destiny's Child, 702, Jade, and the Lopes-produced Blaque.

TLC's debut album, chiefly written by Dallas Austin and Lisa Lopes, consisted of playful lyrics, with some female-empowering songs. It was characterized by Watkins's contralto vocals, Thomas's mezzo-soprano vocals, and Lopes's soprano raps. The musical formula was augmented by the girls' brightly colored videos and peculiar costuming: each girl wore wrapped condoms on their clothing (Lopes also wore one over her left eye in a pair of glasses).

During that period, TLC recorded a song called "Sleigh Ride", which first appeared on the soundtrack of the film Home Alone 2: Lost in New York in 1992. A year later, the song was released as a promotional single and music video for the 1993 holiday season, appearing on the compilation album A LaFace Family Christmas. Also in 1993, TLC released a cover version of The Time's 1981 hit "Get It Up" as a single from the Poetic Justice film soundtrack. During TLC's first national tour, as MC Hammer's opening act, Lopes and Thomas discovered that Watkins had sickle-cell anemia, a blood disorder which she kept as a closely guarded secret until becoming extremely ill while touring with TLC in the southwest US, ending up hospitalized, with Lopes and Thomas staying with her, resulting in the cancellation of some concerts. Watkins continued to battle her condition and eventually became a spokesperson for the Sickle Cell Disease Association of America in the late 1990s.

At the conclusion of the tour, TLC, who had received little monetary compensation up to this point, decided that they no longer wished to employ Pebbles Reid as their manager, in an effort to hold more control over their careers. Reid released the group from its management deal, but they remained signed to Pebbitone, and Reid continued to receive a share of their earnings.

Lopes began dating American football player Andre Rison shortly after the release of Ooooooohhh... On the TLC Tip, and by 1994 the two lived together in Rison's upscale home. Their relationship was allegedly violent at times, and Lopes filed an assault charge against Rison on September 2, 1993, which Rison denied. Lopes was battling alcoholism at the time, having been a heavy drinker since the age of 15. After another fight between the couple in the early morning hours of June 9, 1994, Lopes tossed numerous pairs of Rison's newly purchased shoes into a bathtub, doused them with lighter fluid, and lit them on fire. The fiberglass bathtub quickly melted and set the structural frame of the house on fire. Lopes was arrested and indicted on charges of first-degree arson; she was sentenced to five years of probation and a $10,000 fine. Rison eventually reconciled with Lopes and they continued dating on and off for seven years.

=== 1993–1996: CrazySexyCool, career height and bankruptcy ===
TLC's second studio album, CrazySexyCool, saw the group reunited with producers Dallas Austin, Babyface, and Jermaine Dupri, as well as new collaborators Organized Noize, Chucky Thompson, and Sean "Puffy" Combs. Lopes was released from rehab to attend the recording sessions, but the finished album featured significantly less of her raps and vocals. An R&B and hip hop soul album, CrazySexyCool featured hip-hop beats, funk, deep grooves, propulsive rhythms, and smooth production. Released on November 15, 1994, CrazySexyCool was critically acclaimed, with Rolling Stone ranking it among the 500 Greatest Albums of All Time. CrazySexyCool debuted at number 15. Eventually, it peaked at number three on the Billboard 200 and spent over two years on the chart. The album sold over 7.7 million copies in the United States alone and received a diamond certification from the RIAA. Worldwide the album sold over 14 million copies.

"Waterfalls"
Written by Lisa "Left Eye" Lopes with Marqueze Etheridge and Organized Noize, "Waterfalls" became TLC's biggest hit and is considered one of the classic R&B songs.

All four singles from CrazySexyCool reached the top five on the Billboard Hot 100—"Creep" and "Waterfalls" reached number one, "Red Light Special" peaked at number two, and "Diggin' on You" reached number five. "Waterfalls", an Organized Noize-produced song that features an old-school soul-based musical arrangement, socially conscious lyrics criticizing drug dealing and unsafe sex, and an introspective rap from Lopes, became the biggest hit of TLC's career. Its million-dollar music video was an MTV staple for many months and made TLC the first black act to win MTV Video Music Award for Video of the Year. TLC also became the first female group to ever win a Billboard for Artist of the Year at the 1995 ceremony. At the 38th Annual Grammy Awards, TLC took home Best R&B Album and Best R&B Performance by a Duo or Group for "Creep".

Amidst their apparent success, the members of TLC filed for Chapter 11 bankruptcy on July 3, 1995. TLC said that they had debts totaling $3.5 million, some of it due to Lopes's insurance payments arising from the arson incident and Watkins's medical bills, but the primary reason being that the group received what they called a less than favorable deal from Pebbitone. After Arista Records, LaFace, and Pebbitone recouped their investment for recording costs and manufacturing and distribution (common recoupable charges in most record contracts), both Pebbitone and LaFace Records went on to charge for expenses such as airline travel, hotels, promotion, music videos, food, clothing, and other expenses. According to the members of TLC, ironically, the more successful the album became, the more they were in debt. In addition to this, managers, lawyers, producers, and taxes had to be paid, leaving each member of the group with less than $50,000 a year after having sold millions upon millions of albums.

TLC sought to renegotiate their 1991 contract with LaFace, under which they received only 56 cents (split three ways) per album sold—considerably less than most major label recording contracts—and received even less than this for each single sold; TLC also wanted to dissolve their association with Pebbitone. LaFace Records refused to renegotiate their deal midway through the contract, thus prompting TLC to file a bankruptcy petition. Both Pebbitone and LaFace countered that TLC "simply" wanted more money and were in no real financial danger, resulting in two years of legal debates before the cases were finally settled in late 1996. TLC's contract was renegotiated with LaFace, and Pebbitone agreed to let them out of their production/management deal in exchange for Pebbitone receiving a percentage of royalties on some future releases. By this time, Pebbles had separated from her husband. TLC also bought the rights to their name, which was previously owned by Pebbles.

TLC recorded the theme song to Nickelodeon's popular sketch comedy All That, which was produced and co-written by Arnold Hennings. The show ran for ten seasons from 1994 to 2005, and was later revived in 2019. The group appeared on the soundtrack album of Forest Whitaker's 1995 film Waiting to Exhale with "This Is How It Works" (a song written by Babyface and Lopes) and was set to re-enter the recording studio the following year after signing a new contract with LaFace, with distribution handled by Arista. Watkins marked her first solo release with "Touch Myself", a single from the soundtrack album of the 1996 film Fled; it reached the top 40 on the Billboard Hot 100. Lopes also collaborated with fellow female rappers Missy "Misdemeanor" Elliott, Da Brat, and Angie Martinez on Lil' Kim's single "Not Tonight". It peaked at number six on the Hot 100 and was nominated for Best Rap Performance by a Duo or Group at the 40th Grammy Awards.

=== 1997–2000: FanMail and members feud ===
Preliminary work on TLC's third studio album was delayed when friction arose between the group and their main producer Dallas Austin, who was romantically involved with Thomas and fathered a child with her in 1997. Austin wanted $4.2 million and creative control to work on the project, resulting in a stand-off between the producer and the artists. During this period, Thomas appeared in the Miramax independent film Hav Plenty, while Watkins co-starred with rappers Nas and DMX in Hype Williams's 1998 film Belly. Lopes started her own production company, Left-Eye Productions, and signed Blaque, an R&B trio. Under her guidance, Blaque released their 1999 self-titled debut album, which was certified platinum and contained two top-ten singles on the Billboard Hot 100. Lopes also hosted the short-lived MTV talent series The Cut (1998), which featured then-unknown recording artists Ne-Yo, Aloe Blacc and Anastacia. TLC eventually began working with other producers for their third album, until finally negotiating with Austin, who produced the bulk of the album. Lopes always had an idea of a futuristic feel for the project, which Austin incorporated into the album. Titled FanMail, the album was released in February 1999, another critical and commercial success. It debuted at number one on the Billboard 200 chart and was certified six-time platinum by the RIAA for six million copies shipped in the United States. Worldwide the album exceeded over 10 million copies sold. "No Scrubs" was released as the lead single and became a worldwide hit, topping the singles charts in Australia, Canada, Ireland, New Zealand, and the United States. The album's second single, "Unpretty", incorporated folk and alternative rock influences and became TLC's fourth number-one hit on the Billboard Hot 100. The other three singles performed poorly, charting below position 38 on Billboard’s Hot 100: "Silly Ho", "I'm Good at Being Bad", and Edmonds-written ballad, "Dear Lie".

At the 42nd Annual Grammy Awards, FanMail received eight nominations, and won three awards: Best R&B Album, Best R&B Song and Best R&B Performance by a Duo or Group with Vocals, the last two for "No Scrubs". At the Lady of Soul Awards, the group was honored with the Aretha Franklin Entertainer of the Year Award. TLC went on a worldwide tour called the FanMail Tour. The group had a PayPerView special of their tour, which at the time became PayPerView's highest-grossing televised special.

During and after the release of FanMail, Lopes made it known to the press on multiple occasions that she felt that she was unable to express herself in TLC fully. Her contributions to songs had been reduced to periodic eight-bar raps, and there were several songs in which she had no vocals. Studio session singers such as Debra Killings often sang background vocals for the group's songs, something Lopes also wanted to do on songs in which she did not rap. In late 1999, Entertainment Weekly published a letter written by Lopes that challenged her groupmates Watkins and Thomas to all record solo albums and see which album performed the best:

I challenge Tionne "Player" Watkins (T-Boz) and Rozonda "Hater" Thomas (Chilli) to an album entitled The Challenge. A 3-CD set that contains three solo albums. Each [album] will be due to the record label by October 1, 2000 ... I also challenge [TLC's producer] Dallas "The Manipulator" Austin ... to produce all of the material and do it at a fraction of his normal rate. As I think about it, I'm sure LaFace would not mind throwing in a 1.5 million dollar prize for the winner.

The members eventually settled the feud, and The Challenge was never taken up. After the conclusion of the successful FanMail tour, they took some time off and pursued personal interests. Lopes was the first to begin recording her solo album, Supernova. The album was released in Europe, and the first—and only—single "The Block Party" reached the Top 20 on the UK Singles Chart. The song was released in the United States a few weeks before the scheduled album release. However, when the song did not perform well, the album's release was canceled for North America, and no further singles were promoted. In 2000, Spice Girls member Melanie C collaborated with Lopes on the single "Never Be the Same Again"; it became an international hit reaching number one in many countries. On August 1, 2001, the group performed "Waterfalls" at MTV's 20th anniversary party in New York City, which would be their final performance as a trio before the death of Lopes.

=== 2002–2006: Lisa Lopes' death, 3D and R U the Girl ===
After an unsuccessful debut solo album, Supernova, Lopes started working on her second solo album, known as N.I.N.A. (New Identity Non Applicable), whilst regrouping with Watkins and Thomas to record raps for TLC's fourth album. On April 25, 2002, before both projects were completed, Lopes died in a car crash while filming a documentary in Honduras, which would later be released as The Last Days of Left Eye in 2007 on VH1. After taking a two-week hiatus following Lopes's death, Watkins, Thomas, and Austin decided that they would complete the remainder of their fourth album, to be called 3D, which also featured production from Rodney Jerkins, The Neptunes, Raphael Saadiq, Missy Elliott, and Timbaland. They also decided that TLC would go on an indefinite hiatus after the release and promotion of 3D, rather than replace Lopes and continue as a group. However, they chose to carry on as a duo. Lopes appears vocally on 3D, as she had already completed her vocals for three songs for the new album, two of which were included on the standard version. Two others feature unused vocals from previously unreleased material, and several of the songs eulogized Lopes. 3D was released on November 12, 2002.

With its release, 3D debuted at number six on the Billboard 200 and was certified two times platinum by the RIAA for two million shipped in the United States. It failed to generate success overseas, except for Japan, where it reached number two and achieved platinum from the RIAJ for 200,000 copies sold. The album's lead single, "Girl Talk", peaked at number 28 on the Billboard Hot 100, making it their lowest-charting lead single ever. Its music video featured Watkins and Thomas alone in live-action segments and Lopes in animated segments. It was followed by "Hands Up", which became their first single not to enter the Hot 100 chart (peaking at number seven on the Bubbling Under R&B/Hip-Hop Singles), and "Damaged", which reached number 53 on the Hot 100.

In June 2003, a year after the death of Lopes, at Zootopia, an annual concert hosted by New York radio station Z100 held at Giants Stadium, TLC appeared in what was announced to be their last performance. The group, introduced by Britney Spears and Carson Daly, showed a video montage dedicated to Lopes and went on to perform songs against video footage of Lopes performing the same songs and wearing the same outfits appearing onstage. Nevertheless, TLC made a comeback in February 2004 as a featured artist on a Japanese charity single titled VOICE OF LOVE POSSE with other Japanese artists. In 2003, LaFace released the first TLC's greatest hits album titled Now & Forever: The Hits with a new song, "Come Get Some", featuring Lil Jon and Sean P of the YoungBloodZ. However, the compilation was not released in the United States until June 2005. The album debuted at number 53, with 20,000 copies sold.

On June 25, 2004, Watkins and Thomas announced that they were pitching a reality television show that was eventually picked up for development by UPN. Titled R U the Girl, the show debuted on July 27, 2005. Despite media speculation that the winner of the series was to become a new, permanent member of TLC, Watkins and Thomas have vowed never to replace Lopes with a new member. The winner of the show, 20-year-old Tiffany "O'so Krispie" Baker, worked with Watkins and Thomas to record a new song, "I Bet", and they performed it together during a live concert finale in Atlanta. Roughly 4.1 million viewers tuned in for the season finale of R U The Girl on September 20, 2005. "I Bet" was released to radio and iTunes on October 4, 2005, but failed to make it onto the charts. The song later became a bonus track on Now & Forever: The Hits.

=== 2007–2014: Hiatus and biographical television film ===
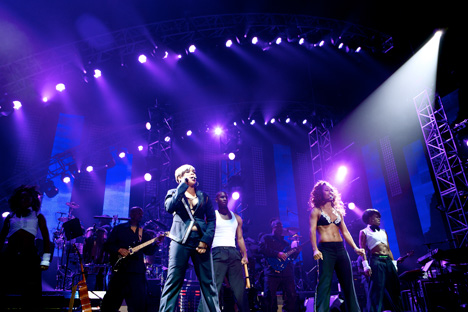
Watkins and Thomas performing at Justin Timberlake's October 2009 benefit concert

On August 20, 2007, a new greatest hits album was released in the UK called Crazy Sexy Hits: The Very Best of TLC. The album fared better than previous compilation Now & Forever: The Hits, peaking at number 57 on the UK Albums Chart. Watkins and Thomas made a special appearance at the BET Awards on June 24, 2008. They, along with the original members of En Vogue and SWV, performed in Alicia Keys's tribute to girl groups. TLC performed a 13-song set in Japan during the 2009 Springroove music festival on April 4. They also performed their set to the 10,000 audience members at the Justin Timberlake and Friends benefit concert, held on October 17, 2009, at the Mandalay Bay Events Center in the Las Vegas Valley, U.S. TLC later performed on the season finale of American Idol, which aired on May 25, 2011. On May 21, 2023, they performed again on the show for the first time in 11 years, singing a medley of their hits, including "No Scrubs", "Creep", and "Waterfalls", with contestant Lucy Love.

In 2012, Watkins and Thomas appeared in British pop group Stooshe's music video for their cover version of "Waterfalls". It was later included in Totally T-Boz, a docu-series chronicling Watkins's move to California, health issues, and solo endeavors. Stooshe later performed "Waterfalls" at the 17th annual MOBO Awards on November 3, 2012, where TLC was honored with Outstanding Contribution to Music. On June 23, 2013, TLC received the Legend Award at the 2013 MTV Video Music Awards Japan, at which they also performed a medley of their hit singles. On June 19, 2013, to celebrate their 20th anniversary in the music industry, the group released a Japan-exclusive compilation album titled TLC 20: 20th Anniversary Hits, which includes remastered versions of their old songs; as a gift for their Japanese fans, they also recorded a new version of "Waterfalls", enlisting Japanese singer Namie Amuro to sing Lopes's part. The decision to record with Amuro was raised as an issue by Lopes's family, who felt "betrayed", as they were not informed about the vocal replacement. Watkins and Thomas subsequently stated that they had been unable to gain clearance to use Lopes's vocals for the new version of the song, but that Lopes would have approved of having Amuro on the track.

TLC was featured on "Crooked Smile", the second single from American rapper J. Cole's 2013 album Born Sinner. It peaked at number 27 on the Billboard Hot 100, giving TLC their first top-40 hit in over a decade. The collaboration won the "Impact Track" award at the 2013 BET Hip Hop Awards and was nominated for MTV Video Music Award for Best Video with a Social Message at the 2014 MTV Video Music Awards. They also made an appearance at the 2013 MTV Video Music Awards, introducing Drake's performance. TLC signed a new recording contract with Epic Records and released an American version of the compilation album 20 on October 15, 2013. The album included one new recording, "Meant to Be", written and produced by Ne-Yo. The song served as the soundtrack for CrazySexyCool: The TLC Story, a TLC biographical telefilm, which premiered on VH1 on October 21, 2013. Directed by Charles Stone III, the film starred Keke Palmer as Thomas, Lil Mama as Lopes, and Drew Sidora as Watkins. The film uses the newly rearranged songs from TLC 20: 20th Anniversary Hits. The premiere broadcast garnered 4.5 million viewers, a five-year ratings high for VH1. In November 2013, TLC had three albums charting on the Billboard 200, including 20 at number 12, CrazySexyCool at number 108 and Now and Forever: The Hits at number 169.

On November 24, 2013, TLC performed a highly anticipated rendition of "Waterfalls" at the 2013 American Music Awards, with Lil Mama delivering Lopes's part, including the rap segment. Subsequently, TLC performed "No Scrubs" with Lil Mama on the Dancing with the Stars television show. In January 2014, TLC appeared at VH1's "Super Bowl Concert Series" performing at the Beacon Theatre in New York City. TLC announced the first Australian tour of their career in April 2014, consisting of shows in Sydney, Brisbane, Melbourne, and Perth. The group performed a set of their hits, including visual and vocal representation of Lopes for the performance. On December 12, 2014, TLC released a new Christmas song titled "Gift Wrapped Kiss".

=== 2015–present: Comeback tours and self-titled studio album ===
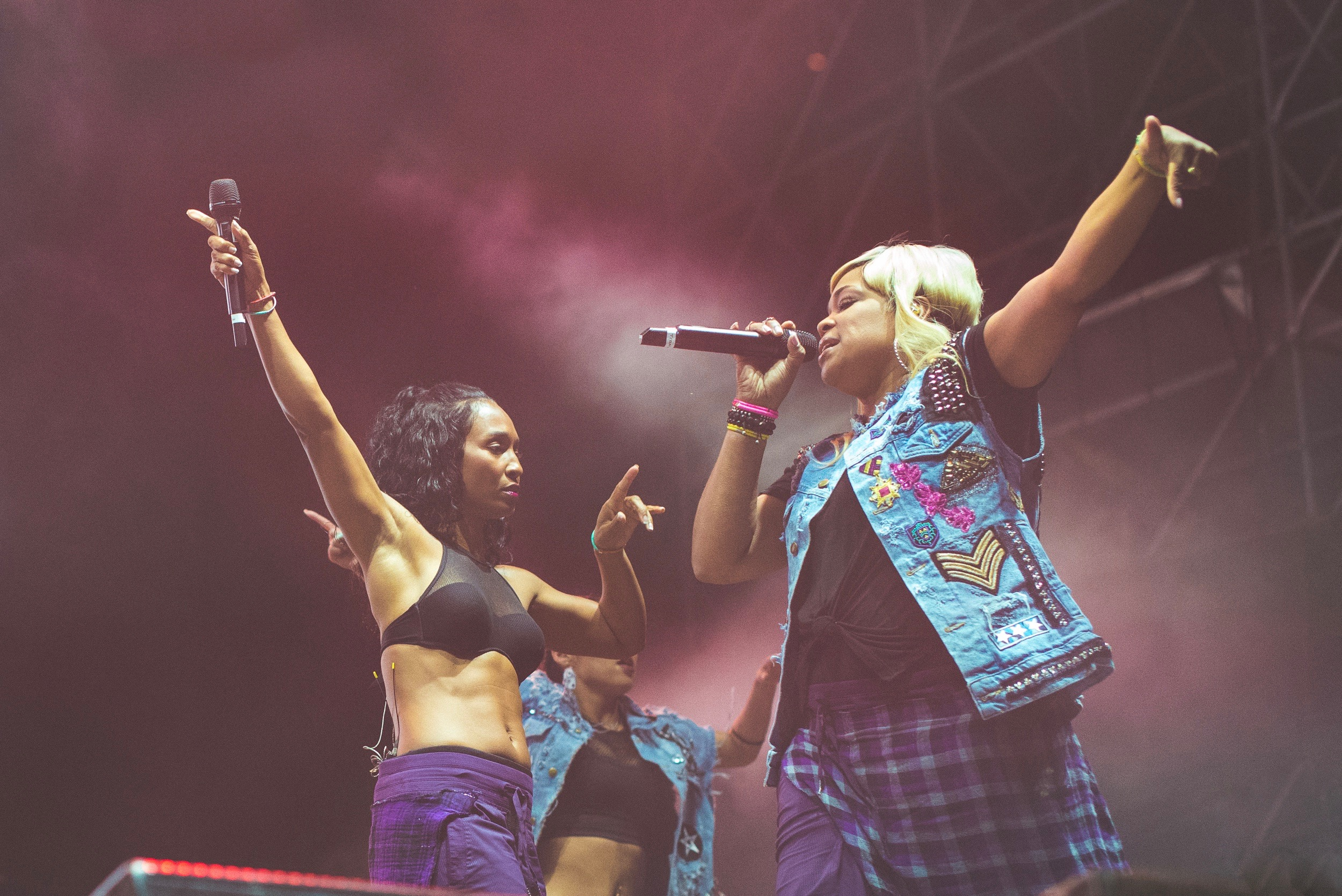
TLC performing in Toronto, September 2016

On January 19, 2015, TLC announced their plan to release their fifth and final album with the launch of a Kickstarter campaign. They asked fans to help finance the project by donating a pledge of at least $5 to reach their goal of $150,000. In less than 48 hours, they surpassed their goal and become the "fastest most-funded pop project in Kickstarter history". Among other artists who donated were New Kids on the Block (donating $10,000), Katy Perry (donating $5,000), Soulja Boy, Bette Midler, and Justin Timberlake. The Kickstarter campaign raised a total of $400,000. In an interview published following the end of the campaign, Watkins and Thomas clarified that they would never split up following the release and promotion of the album and that they would continue to perform together as TLC.

In May 2015, TLC embarked on a North American tour with New Kids on the Block and Nelly titled The Main Event Tour. It was their first tour in 15 years since the completion of the Fanmail Tour in 2000. Subsequently, TLC embarked on TLC 2016–17 Tour and I Love the 90s: The Party Continues Tour. During the development of their album, they petitioned Lisa Lopes's brother Ron Lopes for assistance with making Left Eye's presence on the album a possibility since she had an abundance of unreleased material. However, they ultimately passed on using any of Lopes's archive recordings as the available source material conflicted with the sound that they were recording for the album. On October 28, 2016, TLC released two new songs off of the new album called "Joyride" and "Haters" in Japan. The former hit number one on the iTunes R&B chart in Japan. For the first time ever, on December 8, 2016, TLC performed "Sleigh Ride" with surprise guest Missy Elliott along with their latest song "Sunny" on Taraji's White Hot Holidays, a Fox holiday special hosted by actress Taraji P. Henson.

Their fifth studio album, TLC, was released on June 30, 2017. The album's first single "Way Back" featuring Snoop Dogg was released April 14 to all major digital music outlets and streaming services, but not to radio. The single was produced by D'Mile and released via TLC's newly formed independent label 852 Musiq, which is distributed through RED Distribution in the US. TLC made its UK Debut at London's KOKO on May 9, 2017. Ultimately, TLC sold 12,000 copies domestically in the first week.

In July 2019, TLC embarked on the Whole Lotta Hits Tour, co-headlining with Nelly and supported by Flo Rida. It was announced in October 2020, that television channel A&E Network had greenlit a brand new two-hour documentary special chronicling the group's meteoric rise to the top. Tentatively titled Biography: TLC, the documentary was set to be executive produced by Academy Award-winning director Roger Ross Williams and Emmy Award-winning producer Geoff Martz. Directed by Matt Kay, the special was scheduled to premiere on A&E some time in 2021 but was later pushed back to 2022; then 2023. Titled TLC Forever, it premiered on Lifetime and A&E, on June 2, 2023.

In June 2021, it was announced that TLC would embark on Celebration of CrazySexyCool, an 18-city concert tour of the United States to commemorate the 25th anniversary of their blockbuster sophomore album CrazySexyCool which was certified 12× platinum by the RIAA in October 2019. The tour, which included Bone Thugs-n-Harmony as an opening act and other surprise guests, began on September 3, 2021, in Albertville, Alabama. In March 2022, it was announced TLC would be playing at the Glastonbury Festival in June. On March 13, 2023, it was announced that TLC would join Shaggy on the Hot Summer Nights tour with special guests En Vogue and Sean Kingston; the tour began on June 1.

== Legacy ==
Vibe believed that there would be no "all-Black female R&B group having a chemistry, cultural and commercial impact as remotely comparable as TLC" and dubbed CrazySexyCool as "the blueprint for female ensembles to follow". The Philippine Daily Inquirer called TLC "the most influential female group the world has ever seen". Beyoncé, who was the lead singer of Destiny's Child, said that "TLC has influenced just about every female group that's out there now, and they definitely influenced Destiny's Child." David A. Keeps from Rolling Stone explained the impact of TLC:

TLC's career has been filled with both hits and headlines. The group was one of the few R&B acts to build a strong identity out of its initial success, and they exerted more control over each successive record. Their music—particularly the 11-million-selling CrazySexyCool and the 6-million-selling FanMail, both of which won two Grammys each—set the standard for contemporary R&B. TLC helped to pioneer a deft blend of acoustic and computer sounds that paved the way for groups like Destiny's Child, as did their image as independent women. Whether addressing AIDS in 'Waterfalls' or the struggle for female self-esteem in 'Unpretty', they showed themselves able to take serious issues to the top of the pop charts.

TLC is the best-selling American girl group since the Supremes, with 65 million records sold worldwide. According to the Recording Industry Association of America (RIAA), TLC has 23 million certified album sales. TLC and the Chicks, a country band, are the only two female ensembles to receive the RIAA diamond award, which indicates sales of 10,000,000 copies. According to Billboard, TLC is the second most successful girl group on the Billboard charts, behind the Supremes.

In 2026, a musical about TLC, CrazySexyCool by British playwright Kwame Kwei-Armah, opened at the Arena Stage in Washington, D.C.

== Members ==
=== Current members ===
- Tionne "T-Boz" Watkins (1990–present) – primary lead vocals, dancing, background vocals
- Rozonda "Chilli" Thomas (1991–present) – secondary lead vocals, dancing, background vocals

=== Former members ===
- Lisa "Left Eye" Lopes (1990–2002; her death) – rapping, dancing, background vocals, occasional keyboards
- Crystal Jones (1990–1991) – secondary lead vocals, dancing, background vocals

== Discography ==
Studio albums

- Ooooooohhh... On the TLC Tip (1992)
- CrazySexyCool (1994)
- FanMail (1999)
- 3D (2002)
- TLC (2017)

== Tours ==
Headlining tours

- FanMail Tour (1999–2000)
- 2016 Tour (2016)
- I Love the 90s: The Party Continues Tour (2017)
- CeleBraTion of CrazySexyCool (2021–2022)

Co-headlining tours

- The Main Event (2015)
- Whole Lotta Hits Tour (2019) (with Nelly)
- Hot Summer Nights Tour (2023) (with Shaggy)

== Awards and nominations ==
Throughout their career, TLC became the first girl group to win a MTV Music Video Award for Video of the Year and Billboard for Artist of the Year in 1995, as they also walked away with three more each in the same award shows. They even won various awards where they were the only girl group nominated, such as the 1996 Kids' Choice Awards for Favorite Music Group, Choice Music Group at the first Teen Choice Awards and Best Group Video for No Scrubs at the MTV Video Music Awards in 1999, and Favorite Soul/R&B Band/Duo/Group at the 2000 American Music Award.

== See also ==
- List of highest-certified music artists in the United States
- List of best-selling girl groups

Preceded by Ace of Base	Billboard Artist of the Year; 1996	Succeeded by Alanis Morissette
