= TLC 20: 20th Anniversary Hits =

Compilation album by TLC
- Released: June 19, 2013
- Genre: R&B; pop
- Length: 58:53
- Label: Warner Music Japan

TLC chronology
S.O.U.L. (2012)	TLC 20: 20th Anniversary Hits (2013)	20 (2013)

TLC 20: 20th Anniversary Hits (Japanese: TLC 20 ～20thアニヴァーサリー・ヒッツ～) is a compilation album by American girl group TLC, released on June 19, 2013, by Warner Music Japan. The album is a Japan-exclusive commemorative release to mark the twentieth anniversary of the group's debut.

== Background ==
In 2013, TLC celebrated twenty years since their debut with their first album Ooooooohhh... On the TLC Tip in 1992. In the United States, the VH1 biographical film CrazySexyCool: The TLC Story was in production and premiered later that year, accompanied by the U.S. compilation album 20. For the Japanese market, Warner Music Japan created this distinct edition with newly recorded versions.

For the album, T-Boz and Chilli re-recorded several of their previous hits, and it notably features a newly recorded version of "Waterfalls" featuring Japanese entertainer Namie Amuro, which marked the first time Amuro participated on a track for a Western artist. The decision to feature Namie Amuro on "Waterfalls" stemmed from a personal connection: in the early 2000s, Chilli had met Amuro through producer Dallas Austin (who produced Amuro's song "Something 'Bout the Kiss"). TLC specifically wanted a respected Japanese artist to reinterpret Left Eye's rap section, and they personally chose Amuro. Although recording took place separately, the two parties reunited for a promotional photo shoot in Los Angeles.

The project also includes other newly recorded versions of hits, acoustic and live recordings, and a bonus DVD containing footage from the 1999–2000 FanMail Tour—the group's last full tour as a trio before Lopes' death in 2002.

The album's cover artwork features an anime-style illustration of the group.

== Critical reception ==
CD Japan gave a positive review on the album, describing each track as "catchy" and "highly accessible," and the record as a whole as "a stylish work that does not feel dated."

== Track listing ==
TLC 20: 20th Anniversary Hits track listing
No.	Title	Length
1.	"Waterfalls" (20th anniversary version) (with Namie Amuro)	4:35
2.	"No Scrubs^{[a]}"	3:33
3.	"Creep^{[a]}"	4:28
4.	"Baby-Baby-Baby^{[a]}"	4:48
5.	"Diggin' on You^{[a]}"	5:00
6.	"Unpretty^{[a]}"	4:17
7.	"Waterfalls^{[a]}"	4:42
8.	"Unpretty" (acoustic version)	4:15
9.	"Baby-Baby-Baby" (live)	2:33
10.	"Creep" (live)	3:42
11.	"Unpretty" (live)	4:35
12.	"Waterfalls" (live)	6:06
13.	"No Scrubs" (live)	3:04

Notes

- ^{^a} Newly recorded version

=== DVD (CD+DVD edition only) ===
Live footage from the 1999-2000 FanMail Tour.

1. "Baby-Baby-Baby" (live)
2. "Creep" (live)
3. "Unpretty" (live)
4. "Waterfalls" (live)
5. "No Scrubs" (live)

== Charts ==
Chart performance for TLC 20: 20th Anniversary Hits
Chart (2013)	Peak position
Japanese Albums (Oricon)	18
Japanese Top Album Sales (Billboard Japan)	16
