= 20 (TLC album) =

Compilation album by TLC
- Released: October 15, 2013
- Recorded: 1991–2013
- Length: 57:11
- Labels: Epic; LaFace
- Producers: Dallas Austin; Babyface; Kevin "Shekspere" Briggs; Jermaine Dupri; Organized Noize; Phatboiz; L.A. Reid; Manuel Seal; Daryl Simmons; Curtis "Sauce" Wilson

TLC chronology
TLC 20: 20th Anniversary Hits (2013)	20 (2013)	TLC (2017)

20 is a compilation album by American girl group TLC. It was released on October 15, 2013, by Epic and LaFace Records, marking both the group's 20-plus year legacy in entertainment business and the release of their biographical VH1 original film, CrazySexyCool: The TLC Story, which largely inspired the track listing for 20. Many of their hits are featured, including their four number-one singles: "Creep", "Waterfalls", "No Scrubs", and "Unpretty", as well as "Meant to Be", a new track co-written by singer Ne-Yo. Most of the tracks are featured in the original radio format, like on their previous compilation album Now and Forever: The Hits, and "No Scrubs" is featured in its original radio version with an accompanying rap of Left Eye.

== Commercial performance ==
The album peaked at number 12 on the Billboard 200 the week after the premiere of the VH1 original film CrazySexyCool: The TLC Story, becoming the group's highest-charting greatest hits collection in the United States. The album stayed on the Billboard 200 for a total of six weeks. The album also peaked at number two on Billboard's Top R&B/Hip-Hop Albums chart.

== Track listing ==
No.	Title	Writer(s)	Producer(s)	Length
1.	"Ain't 2 Proud 2 Beg" (U.S. 7" edit, from Ooooooohhh... On the TLC Tip, 1992)	Dallas Austin; Lisa "Left Eye" Lopes; Robert Bell; Claydes Smith; Robert Mickens; Donald Boyce; Richard Westfield; Dennis Thomas; Ronald Bell; George Brown; Hamish Stuart; Owen McIntyre; Alan Gorrie; Steven Ferrone; Malcolm Duncan; Roger Ball	Austin	4:05
2.	"What About Your Friends" (radio edit w/ rap, from Ooooooohhh... On the TLC Tip, 1992)	Austin; Lopes	Austin	4:04
3.	"Baby-Baby-Baby" (radio edit, from Ooooooohhh... On the TLC Tip, 1992)	L.A. Reid; Babyface; Daryl Simmons	Reid; Babyface; Simmons	3:57
4.	"Hat 2 da Back" (album version edit, from Ooooooohhh... on the TLC Tip, 1992)	Austin; Lopes; Kevin Wales; Harry Casey; Richard Finch	Austin	4:05
5.	"Creep" (from CrazySexyCool, 1994)	Austin	Austin	4:26
6.	"Waterfalls" (single edit, from CrazySexyCool, 1994)	Marqueze Etheridge; Lopes; Rico Wade; Patrick Brown; Raymon Murray	Organized Noize	4:17
7.	"Red Light Special" (radio edit, from CrazySexyCool, 1994)	Babyface	Babyface	4:37
8.	"Diggin' on You" (from CrazySexyCool, 1994)	Babyface	Babyface	4:14
9.	"Kick Your Game" (from CrazySexyCool, 1994)	Jermaine Dupri; Manuel Seal; Lopes	Dupri; Seal^{[a]}	4:13
10.	"No Scrubs" (rap version, from FanMail, 1999)	Kevin Briggs; Kandi Burruss; Tameka Cottle; Lopes	Kevin "Shekspere" Briggs	3:36
11.	"Unpretty" (radio version, from FanMail, 1999)	Austin; Tionne "T-Boz" Watkins	Austin	4:00
12.	"Silly Ho" (from FanMail, 1999)	Austin	Cyptron	4:15
13.	"Damaged" (alternate mix, from 3D, 2002)	Austin; Watkins	Austin	3:52
14.	"Meant to Be" (new recording)	Shaffer Smith; Allen Arthur; Keith Justice; Clayton Reilly	Phatboiz; Curtis "Sauce" Wilson^{[b]}	3:28

Notes

- ^{^a} signifies a co-producer
- ^{^b} signifies a vocal producer

Sample credits

- "Ain't 2 Proud 2 Beg" samples "Escape-ism" by James Brown, "Jungle Boogie" by Kool & the Gang, and "School Boy Crush" by Average White Band.
- "Hat 2 da Back" samples "Big Ole Butt" by LL Cool J and "What Makes You Happy" by KC and the Sunshine Band.
- "Creep" contains a sample of "Hey Young World" as performed by Slick Rick.

== Charts ==
=== Weekly charts ===
Chart (2013)	Peak position
US Billboard 200	12
US Top R&B/Hip-Hop Albums (Billboard)	4

=== Year-end charts ===
Chart (2013)	Position
US Top R&B/Hip-Hop Albums (Billboard)	85
Chart (2014)	Position
US Top R&B/Hip-Hop Albums (Billboard)	88

== Certifications ==
Region	Certification	Certified units/sales
New Zealand (RMNZ)	Platinum	15,000^{‡}
United Kingdom (BPI)	Silver	60,000^{‡}
^{‡} Sales+streaming figures based on certification alone.
