= R U the Girl =

- Title screen
- Genre: Reality competition
- Directed by: Tony Sacco; Jeff Margolis (live finale)
- Presented by: Ryan Devlin (live finale)
- Judges: Tionne Watkins; Rozonda Thomas
- Theme music composer: Richard Butler; Melvin Coleman; Rozonda Thomas; Tionne Watkins
- Opening theme: "I Bet", performed by TLC
- Composer: Craig Owens
- Country of origin: United States
- Original language: English
- No. of seasons: 1
- No. of episodes: 9

Production
- Executive producers: Jay Blumenfield; Tony Marsh; Rozonda Thomas; Tionne Watkins; Laurie Girion; Bill Diggins; Adam Freeman (live finale)
- Producers: Kristine Augustyn; Sean M. Kelly; Richard Martinez; Tom Boles
- Editors: Patrick Fraser; Paul Frazier
- Running time: 60 minutes
- Production companies: The Jay & Tony Show; R U The Girl Productions

Original release
- Network: UPN
- Release: July 27 – September 21, 2005

R U the Girl (also known as R U the Girl with T-Boz and Chilli) is an American reality television music competition series that aired on UPN from July 27 to September 21, 2005. The series featured Tionne "T-Boz" Watkins and Rozonda "Chilli" Thomas, the remaining members of the R&B girl group TLC whose former member, Lisa "Left Eye" Lopes, died in a car crash in Honduras in 2002. Initially promoted by the network as a contest to replace Lopes 3 years after her death, both Watkins and Thomas clarified that the winner of the contest would not be joining TLC full-time and would not be a full-time replacement member; the winner would only provide guest vocals on a new single by the duo.

== Synopsis ==
On June 25, 2004, Tionne Watkins and Rozonda Thomas announced that they were pitching a reality television show that was eventually picked up for development by UPN. The casting tour for the series began on February 5, 2005 in Los Angeles, with tour stops in New York City, Chicago, Dallas, Washington, D.C., Atlanta, and Miami. After the semifinalists were selected, they were each judged on their ability to sing by Watkins and Thomas. The selected finalists then moved into a house in Atlanta together, where they were given challenges set by Watkins and Thomas that tested their ability to work with each other, as well as their singing, rapping, dancing and styling skills, their creativity and their personalities. The finalists were narrowed down to the top two, who would then each train with Watkins and Thomas to learn a dance routine and contribute vocals for a new single from TLC, with Watkins and Thomas personally selecting the winner to appear on and perform the single with them. Filming for the main episodes concluded on April 26, 2005.

The program aired nine episodes, with seven episodes being the main episodes, the eighth episode being an overview of the series and original TLC home videos, and the ninth being the series finale. The episodes' names are also puns based on TLC's songs. The finale episode was broadcast live from the Orpheum Theatre in Los Angeles, and featured the final two contestants, O'so Krispie and Mirrah Fay-Parker. Krispie (Tiffany Baker), a 20-year-old choreographer from Atlanta, was ultimately chosen as the winner and performed the single "I Bet" with Watkins and Thomas on the series finale.

== Episodes ==
Episode #	Episode title	Original airdate	Viewers (millions)
1-1	"No Scrubs in New York City"	July 27, 2005	2.69
1-2	"T-Boz & Chilli Get CrazySexyCool in Miami"	August 3, 2005	2.49
1-3	"Baby-Baby-Baby, We're in Los Angeles"	August 10, 2005	2.47
1-4	"What About Your Friends in Atlanta?"	August 17, 2005	2.48
1-5	"Whoop De Whoo, It's Girl Talk"	August 24, 2005	2.76
1-6	"Unpretty No More"	August 31, 2005	2.81
1-7	"Chasin' Waterfalls"	September 7, 2005	2.76
1-8	"Ain't 2 Proud 2 Beg for More"	September 14, 2005	2.98
1-9	"You are the Girl"	September 21, 2005	4.09

== "I Bet" ==
"I Bet"

Single by TLC featuring O'so Krispie

from the album Now & Forever: The Hits
- Released: October 25, 2005
- Recorded: 2005
- Studio: J Studio, Atlanta, Georgia; Patchwerk Recordings, Atlanta, Georgia
- Genre: Hip hop; R&B
- Length: 3:23
- Label: Arista
- Songwriters: Richard "Rico Love" Butler; Melvin Coleman; Rozonda Thomas; Tionne Watkins; O'so Krispie (uncredited)
- Producer: Melvin "Saint Nick" Coleman

TLC singles chronology
"Come Get Some" (2003)	"I Bet" (2005)	"Let's Just Do It" (2009)

"I Bet" is a song by American girl group TLC. It was written by band members Tionne "T-Boz" Watkins and Rozonda "Chilli" Thomas along with Rico Love and Melvin "Saint Nick" Coleman, with production helmed by the latter. The uptempo track features rapper O'so Krispie, the winner of R U the Girl, a 2005 UPN reality show whose purpose was to find a singer that would record a song with TLC.

Before Krispie was announced as the winner of the show, she and fellow finalist and eventual runner up Mirrah Fay-Parker each recorded separate versions of the song, each contributing backing vocals and a rap that they had composed themselves. However, despite the Krispie version being released as a single, Krispie's songwriting contributions are uncredited on the single.

The resulting track was titled "I Bet," which was commercially released as a single in October 2005. The physical CD single sold 2,000 units in the United States, according to Nielsen SoundScan, while the digital download of the song has moved over 4,000. The record was later added to the digital reissue of TLC's compilation album Now & Forever: The Hits.

=== Track listing ===
Digital download

1. "I Bet" – 3:23

=== Credits and personnel ===
Credits adapted from the liner notes of Now & Forever: The Hits.

- Songwriting – Richard Butler, Melvin Coleman, Rozonda Thomas, Tionne Watkins, O'so Krispie (uncredited)
- Production – Melvin "Saint Nick" Coleman
- Mixing – Leslie Brathwaite, Carlton Lynn
- Engineering – Kori Anders, Wyatt Coleman
- Mastering – Chaz Harper
