= Damaged (TLC song) =

Single by TLC

from the album 3D
- B-side: "Hands Up"
- Released: February 24, 2003
- Recorded: July 2002
- Studio: DARP Studios, Atlanta
- Genre: Pop rock
- Length: 3:51
- Label: Arista
- Songwriters: Dallas Austin; Tionne "T-Boz" Watkins
- Producer: Dallas Austin

TLC singles chronology
"Hands Up" (2002)	"Damaged" (2003)	"Come Get Some" (2003)

"Damaged" is a song by American recording group TLC. It was written by band member Tionne "T-Boz" Watkins and long time contributor Dallas Austin and recorded for the band's fourth studio album, 3D (2002), the latter also serving as its producer. The lyrics of the song talk about freedom and healing from hurt and pain.

The song was released as the album's second international single and third US single and final single from the album overall on February 24, 2003, and internationally on June 16, 2003. While not as commercially successful as leading single "Girl Talk", the song peaked at number 21 on the New Zealand Singles Chart and in the United States, reached the top twenty of Billboard's Pop Songs chart. On the Billboard Hot 100, "Damaged" peaked at number 53. The song was included on both of the group's official greatest hits albums: Now & Forever: The Hits and 20.

== Background ==
Dallas Austin originally wrote another song titled "Cool" for TLC. However, Austin felt reluctant to give them the song after breaking up with TLC member Chilli. Austin recalled it for Billboard:

I actually wrote that song for TLC, when me and Chilli broke up. Because at that point she'd moved on and I'd moved on, she was dating someone and I was dating someone. But the problem was, when it came time to record it, I didn't want to record it with them. I was so aggravated being in the sessions. It was very obvious who it was about and what it was, and it was hard. I finally just took it off. I said, "I'm not going to do this with you guys, let's find another song."

As a result, Austin decided to give "Cool" to Gwen Stefani for her debut solo album Love. Angel. Music. Baby., and instead wrote another song for TLC with a slightly similar concept:

It wasn't that cool to record it with them. And they got mad at first. I had written a song called "Damaged", and they said, "This is about how you feel, too." And I said, "No, no. This is about how a girl feels in a relationship with a guy and now she's damaged to the other guy."

== Critical reception ==
David Browne from Entertainment Weekly called the track "a genuinely uplifting song about being emotionally screwed up, benefits tremendously from the use of live instruments rather than samples." Slant Magazine's Sal Cinquemani called the track "poignant."

== Music video ==
In the music video for the song, directed by Joseph Kahn, a young woman, (played by actress Justina Machado) works two jobs to support her family. One day she comes home and finds her boyfriend in bed with another girl. After confronting him, he hits her. She then finds herself stuck in an abusive relationship as well as trying to look after her child. She finds herself torn and unsure of what to do, eventually literally falling to pieces at the end of the video as she crumbles into hundreds of tiny jigsaw puzzle pieces. It shows other "damaged" women falling to pieces. The lead woman is shown to be put back together by her daughter, and she becomes happier.

== Track listing ==
US 12" single
No.	Title	Writer(s)	Producer(s)	Length
1.	"Damaged" (Radio Mix)	Dallas Austin; Tionne "T-Boz" Watkins	Austin	3:51
2.	"Damaged" (Instrumental)	Austin; Watkins	Austin	3:51

European CD single
No.	Title	Writer(s)	Producer(s)	Length
1.	"Damaged" (Radio Mix)	Austin; Watkins	Austin	3:51
2.	"Hands Up" (So So Def Remix featuring Clipse)	Babyface; Daryl Simmons; Christopher Wallace; Sean Combs; Steven Jordan	Babyface; Simmons; Jermaine Dupri^{[A]}; LaMarquis Jefferson^{[B]}	4:15

European enhanced CD single
No.	Title	Writer(s)	Producer(s)	Length
1.	"Damaged" (Radio Mix)	Austin; Watkins	Austin	3:51
2.	"Hands Up" (Richard X Extended Remix)	Babyface; Simmons	Babyface; Simmons; Richard X^{[A]}	4:37
3.	"Hands Up" (Richard X Radio Remix)	Babyface; Simmons	Babyface; Simmons; Richard X^{[A]}	3:50
4.	"Hands Up" (So So Def Remix featuring Clipse)	Babyface; Simmons; Wallace; Combs; Jordan	Babyface; Simmons; Dupri^{[A]}; Jefferson^{[B]}	4:15
5.	"Hands Up" (Video)			4:01

Notes

- ^{^[A]} denotes additional producer
- ^{^[B]} denotes additional co-producer

Sample credits

- "Hands Up" (So So Def Remix)" contains portions from "Nasty Boy" as performed by The Notorious B.I.G.

== Charts ==
Chart performance for "Damaged"
Chart (2003)	Peak position
Netherlands (Dutch Top 40 Tipparade)	21
New Zealand (Recorded Music NZ)	21
US Billboard Hot 100	53
US Pop Airplay (Billboard)	19
US Rhythmic Airplay (Billboard)	34
