= I Love the 90s: The Party Continues Tour =

2017 concert series

- Promotional poster for tour
- Start date: July 1, 2017
- End date: September 16, 2017
- Legs: 1
- No. of shows: 30 in North America
- Website: Tour Website

concert chronology
- I Love the 90s Tour (2016-17); I Love the 90s: The Party Continues Tour (2017)

The I Love the 90s: The Party Continues Tour is the second edition in a concert series created by the Universal Attractions Agency. The tour is a celebration of prominent acts from the 1990s. American vocal group TLC headlined the 2017 edition. Each show featured six to eight acts performing in arenas and amphitheaters in North America.

== Lineup ==
Headliner

- TLC

Featured acts

- Naughty By Nature
- Mark McGrath
- All-4-One
- Montell Jordan
- Biz Markie
- Snap!
- Blackstreet
- C+C Music Factory with Freedom Williams

Special guests

- Kid 'n Play (Los Angeles, Concord)
- Rob Base (Concord, Las Vegas, Phoenix, Cedar Park, Mount Pleasant, Kettering, Anderson, Big Flats, Gilford, Vienna, St. Charles)
- Coolio (Las Vegas, Tucson, Kettering, Gilford, Uncasville)
- Color Me Badd (Las Vegas, Clarkston, Kettering, Gilford, Uncasville, Duluth)
- Tone Loc (Los Angeles, Grand Prairie, Mount Pleasant, Maplewood, Bonner Springs, Salem)
- Young MC (New Orleans)
- O-Town (Highland Park)

== Tour dates ==
Date	City	Country	Venue
North America
July 1, 2017	Greenwood Village	United States	Fiddler's Green Amphitheatre
July 2, 2017	Albuquerque	United States	Isleta Amphitheater
July 7, 2017	Everett	United States	Xfinity Arena
July 8, 2017	Abbotsford	Canada	Abbotsford Centre
July 14, 2017	Los Angeles	United States	Greek Theatre
July 15, 2017	Concord	United States	Concord Pavilion
July 21, 2017	Las Vegas	United States	Downtown Las Vegas Events Center
July 22, 2017	Phoenix	United States	Talking Stick Resort Arena
July 23, 2017	Tucson	United States	AVA Amphitheater
July 28, 2017	Cedar Park	United States	H-E-B Center
July 29, 2017	Grand Prairie	United States	Verizon Theatre at Grand Prairie
July 30, 2017	Houston	United States	NRG Arena
August 2, 2017	Mount Pleasant	United States	Soaring Eagle Outdoor Concert Area
August 4, 2017	Green Bay	United States	Resch Center
August 6, 2017	Clarkston	United States	DTE Energy Music Theatre
August 8, 2017	Kettering	United States	Fraze Pavilion
August 10, 2017	Lincoln	United States	Pinewood Bowl Theater
August 25, 2017^{[A]}	Essex Junction	United States	Coca-Cola Grandstand
August 26, 2017	Scranton	United States	The Pavilion at Montage Mountain
August 27, 2017	Gilford	United States	Bank of New Hampshire Pavilion
August 30, 2017	Glen Allen	United States	Innsbrook After Hours
September 1, 2017	Camden	United States	BB&T Pavilion
September 2, 2017	Uncasville	United States	Mohegan Sun Arena
September 3, 2017	Vienna	United States	Filene Center
September 8, 2017	Salem	United States	Salem Civic Center
September 9, 2017	Duluth	United States	Infinite Energy Arena
September 10, 2017	St. Petersburg	United States	Al Lang Stadium
September 13, 2017	Ottawa	Canada	TD Place Arena
September 15, 2017	Cleveland	United States	Family Arena
September 16, 2017^{[B]}	Highland Park	United States	Ravinia Park Pavilion

Festivals and other miscellaneous performances
^{A} Champlain Valley Fair
^{B} Ravinia Festival

Cancellations and rescheduled shows

July 16, 2017	Paso Robles, California	Vina Robles Amphitheatre	Cancelled
August 11, 2017	Bonner Springs, Kansas	Providence Medical Center Amphitheater	Cancelled
August 12, 2017	Anderson, Indiana	Hoosier Park Outdoor Music Center	Cancelled
