= CrazySexyCool: The TLC Story =

- Promotional poster
- Written by: Kate Lanier
- Directed by: Charles Stone III
- Starring: Keke Palmer; Niatia "Lil Mama" Kirkland; Drew Sidora
- Music by: Jay Wadley
- Country of origin: United States
- Original language: English

Production
- Producers: Bill Diggins; Rozonda "Chilli" Thomas; Tionne "T-Boz" Watkins; Keri Flint; Kate Lanier; Maggie Malina; Rick Krim; Alexander A. Mortlagh; Jill Holmes; Jeff Olde
- Cinematography: Eric Maddison
- Editor: John L. Roberts
- Production companies: Diggit Entertainment Group; In Cahoots Media, Inc. The Popfilms Movie Company; VH1 Productions

Original release
- Network: VH1
- Release: October 21, 2013

CrazySexyCool: The TLC Story is a 2013 American biographical television film about the R&B and hip hop musical trio TLC. Directed by Charles Stone III, written by Kate Lanier, and named after the group's 1994 album CrazySexyCool, the film stars Keke Palmer as Rozonda "Chilli" Thomas, Niatia "Lil Mama" Kirkland as Lisa "Left Eye" Lopes and Drew Sidora as Tionne "T-Boz" Watkins. The real-life Thomas and Watkins also served as executive producers of the film.

The film's premiere on VH1 on October 21, 2013 generated 4.5 million viewers, making it the highest-rated television film premiere of 2013, as well as the highest-rated original film premiere in VH1 history.

TLC released a compilation album, 20, via LaFace and Epic Records on October 15, 2013, marking both the band's 20-plus years in the entertainment business and the film's release, which largely inspired the album's track listing. The film was released on DVD on October 21, 2014.

== Plot ==
In 1990 in Atlanta, Georgia, Tionne Watkins's friend Marie Davis persuades her to audition for a girl group Ian Burke is forming for LaFace Records. Although reluctant, she brings Crystal Jones, the group's founder, to meet her rapper friend Lisa Lopes. The trio performs "Meeting in the Ladies Room" in January 1991 for Perri "Pebbles" Reid and her husband Antonio "L.A." Reid, co-founder of LaFace, who approve Tionne and Lisa. Lisa calls her family in Philadelphia but learns her father Ronald has died. Later that year, Rozonda Thomas, a backup dancer for Damian Dame, notices Pebbles speaking with her dance teacher; she rushes over and amazes everyone present with her vocals. She meets Lisa, Tionne, and Tionne's longtime friend, music producer Dallas Austin; the girls immediately bond and successfully audition with "What About Your Friends". To preserve the name TLC, Rozonda is rechristened as "Chilli".

Pebbles informs the trio that they will be monetarily compensated beyond their weekly $25 stipend once they have sold records and tickets to shows. Before departing for a meeting one day, she instructs Dallas to keep the girls rehearsing, but instead, he instigates a food fight with them and romances Chilli in a sound booth. Pebbles reprimands the quartet's behavior upon her return, suspends Chilli and announces auditions for her replacement. Dallas comforts an upset Chilli, leading to sexual intercourse. Following her reinstatement, she notices her pregnancy and undergoes an abortion. After she recovers, the trio shoot the music video for their debut single "Ain't 2 Proud 2 Beg" from their debut album Ooooooohhh... On the TLC Tip. Midway through their successful first nationwide tour in 1992, Tionne is hospitalized following a post-concert collapse backstage. She publicizes her previously-undisclosed sickle cell anemia, undeterred by the grim prognosis. Upon returning, the trio decides to buy Pebbles out to obtain more artistic freedom for subsequent albums.

In 1993, the girls begin recording their second album CrazySexyCool. At a nightclub one night, Lisa meets Andre Rison, a wide receiver for the NFL's Atlanta Falcons. In 1994, Chilli discovers another woman's pregnancy with Dallas's child, pouring her heartbreak into "Creep". On June 8, Dallas reconciles with Chilli, while Lisa and her friend notice newly-purchased tennis shoes on Andre's bed; she retaliatorily burns them in the bathtub, unintentionally torching the house. Eventually sentenced to 5 years of probation and fined $10,000, she is released during her rehabilitation for two recording sessions with Tionne and Chilli, contributing an introspective rap verse to their biggest hit "Waterfalls".

After the trio announce their bankruptcy at the 1996 Grammys, Lisa details owing $200,000 due to an unfair contract. Their new manager, Bill Diggins, offers them a worldwide headlining tour and an improved profit margin following their next record. During the recording of their third album FanMail, Chilli gives birth to her and Dallas' son, Tron, in 1997. In 1998, during a sickle-cell scare, Tionne pens a poem detailing both a woman's self-image issues and unrealistic popular concepts of beauty, which becomes "Unpretty". During recording, Chilli breaks up with Dallas, citing incompatibility.

In October 1999, Lisa challenges Tionne and Chilli over who is the group's most successful solo member. Following a confrontation before a scheduled appearance on TRL, Bill urges her to resolve her in-group issues before the trio tour to support FanMail, or they will become bankrupt again. In February 2000, Lisa opts to travel to Honduras for spiritual healing and begin work on her debut solo album Supernova. Later, Tionne gives birth to her daughter Chase, despite potential risks. After Lisa breaks down at the 2000 Grammys due to poor international sales and reception of Supernova, Tionne and Chilli comfortingly urge her to return to Honduras for more spiritual healing before working on their next album.

By early 2002, the group is recording their fourth album 3D, with Tionne and Chilli adjusting to motherhood and Lisa contributing raps to several songs before heading to Honduras. On April 25, a devastated Tionne and Chilli learn that Lisa has perished in a car accident in La Ceiba, Honduras, while filming her documentary. The duo vow to stay together despite the tragedy, and 10 years later, they reunite in the studio to record their next album.

== Cast ==
- Keke Palmer as Rozonda "Chilli" Thomas
  - Hannah Cartwright as Young Chilli
- Niatia "Lil Mama" Kirkland as Lisa "Left Eye" Lopes
  - Ariana Neal as Young Lisa
- Drew Sidora as Tionne "T-Boz" Watkins
  - Chase Rolison as Young Tionne
- Rochelle Aytes as Perri "Pebbles" Reid
- Evan Ross as Dallas Austin
- Carl Anthony Payne II as Antonio "L.A." Reid
- Tasia Sherel as Ava Thomas, Chilli's mother
- Jim Coleman as Dr. Sebi
- Shaun Clay as Sean "Puffy" Combs
- Rico Ball as Andre Rison
- Ed Amatrudo as Clive Davis
- Shervoski Couture as Choreographer
- DeMontrez Spears as Dalvin DeGrate
- Donny Boaz as Bill Diggins
- Chantell D. Christopher as Gayle Watkins, T-Boz's mother
- Brave Williams as Singer at Award show
- Brooke Montalvo as Crystal Jones
- Mary Shaw as Tionne's Doctor
- Renell Gibbs as Larry (Marshall Lorenzo Martin)
- Shamea Morton as Pregnant girl
- Nadiyah Hollis as Bleached Weave Girl
- Charles Walton as Radio Host
- Tionne "T-Boz" Watkins as herself (plus archive footage)
- Lisa "Left Eye" Lopes as herself (archive footage)
- Rozonda "Chilli" Thomas as herself (plus archive footage)
- Shaffer "Ne-Yo" Smith as himself

== Critical reception ==
On Metacritic, CrazySexyCool: The TLC Story has a score of 57 based on 6 critics’ reviews.

Jon Caramanica of The New York Times wrote, “Director Charles Stone III ('Drumline') does an admirable job remaking old music videos almost note for note and synthesizing faux vintage footage of varying types into a visually dynamic whole,” but said the film gives disproportionate time to the group's financial squabbles with their record label and not enough time to their accomplishments and accolades.

In a positive review, Brian Lowry of Variety write, “Few stories are more fraught with cliches than the rising actor/musician unprepared for the dizzying view from the top, but the project meshes neatly with VH1’s urban appeal.” He added, “the story and central players are intriguing enough that the combination of music and melodrama pretty well speaks for itself, without requiring much embellishment.”

Willa Paskin of Slate said while the film is “not a particularly well-constructed biopic, hopping from moment to moment like moviemaking was just a matter of checking scenes off a list…it does everything that Tionne 'T-Boz' Watkins and Rozonda 'Chilli' Thomas, the two surviving members of TLC, could ask for: It will absolutely convince you that TLC was amazing.” Paskin added “the movie nails TLC’s particular infectious, rambunctious spirit, their defining characteristic since they burst onto the scene in the early ’90s”, and that ”the three actresses playing TLC, who all bring more to the parts than just looking like them, nail [their] montage scenes and their vibe of deep, silly friendship.”
