= Hands Up (TLC song) =

2003 single by TLC

Single by TLC

from the album 3D
- Released: February 3, 2003
- Length: 3:48
- Label: Arista
- Songwriters: Babyface; Daryl Simmons
- Producers: Babyface; Daryl Simmons

TLC singles chronology
"Girl Talk" (2002)	"Hands Up" (2003)	"Damaged" (2003)

"Hands Up" a song by American girl group TLC. It was written and produced by both Babyface and Daryl Simmons for the band's fourth studio album, 3D (2002). A sensual mid-tempo song that deals with romantic betrayal, it was selected and released as the album's second single in the United States on February 3, 2003, following lead single "Girl Talk" (2002). Arista Records consulted several producers to remix the song for its single release, including Richard X, LaMarquis Jefferson, and Jermaine Dupri.

Released to positive reviews, "Hands Up" garnered TLC a nomination at the 2004 Grammy Awards for Best R&B Performance by a Duo or Group with Vocal. Commercially, the song was less successful than previous singles; it became the band's first single release to neither enter the US Billboard Hot 100 nor the Hot R&B/Hip-Hop Songs chart. An accompanying music video, directed by Matthew Rolston and set at a sex club, features a cameo appearance by Countess Vaughn.

== Critical reception ==
Chuck Taylor from Billboard found that the song lacked the qualities of previous hits such as "No Scrubs" or "Waterfalls with "its creeping, downtempo "Hernando's Hideaway" vibe". However, he also acknowledged that "with a few listens, the track's "my man's a dog" theme gains favor and slowly tickles its way into the brain. T-Boz's trademark husky vocals add to the appeal." In his review of parent album 3D, Andy Battaglia from The A.V. Club noted: "In TLC's universe, the sensual call-out to Krispy Kremes on "Hands Up" sounds just as heartfelt as the adultery-inspired sadness of "So So Dumb." Legions of R&B acts waver through regrettably blank genre plays, but few make them as rich and worthwhile as TLC." Dimitri Ehrlich from Vibe described "Hands Up" as "a film noir–like tale of romantic betrayal. There's a confrontation inside an ATL club, replete with swarming hoochies and a cheating man caught red-handed [...] When the song ends, we're still waiting for Lopes's piercing lines. Without her, the story is incomplete. And in her absence, her presence is everywhere."

== Music video ==
A music video for "Hands Up" was shot on January 9 and 10, 2003 in Los Angeles. T-Boz and Chilli reunited with Matthew Rolston, director of their videos for "Creep" and "Red Light Special", to film the visuals. In it, both band members are at a futuristic strip club called Left Eye, named after Lisa Lopes' nickname. The venue, which is flooded with music and people, breaks off into a ladies-only section and a gentlemen's lounge. In the ladies-only lounge of the club, T-Boz and Chilli pass the time scanning half-naked men with UPC tattoos, while also watching them pose, giving massages and stripping for other visitors. Looking through a peephole, they see T-Boz's boyfriend, played by actor Marvin Jordan, in the side of the club that caters to men, going crazy over the women around him. Actress Countess Vaughn plays the madam of the venue in the video. ´

== Track listing ==
European CD single
No.	Title	Writer(s)	Producer(s)	Length
1.	"Damaged" (Radio Mix)	Dallas Austin; Tionne "T-Boz" Watkins	Austin	3:51
2.	"Hands Up" (So So Def Remix featuring Clipse)	Babyface; Daryl Simmons; Christopher Wallace; Sean Combs; Steven Jordan	Babyface; Simmons; Jermaine Dupri^{[A]}; LaMarquis Jefferson^{[B]}	4:15

European enhanced CD single
No.	Title	Writer(s)	Producer(s)	Length
1.	"Damaged" (Radio Mix)	Austin; Watkins	Austin	3:51
2.	"Hands Up" (Richard X Extended Remix)	Babyface; Simmons	Babyface; Simmons; Richard X^{[A]}	4:37
3.	"Hands Up" (Richard X Radio Remix)	Babyface; Simmons	Babyface; Simmons; Richard X^{[A]}	3:50
4.	"Hands Up" (So So Def Remix featuring Clipse)	Babyface; Simmons; Wallace; Combs; Jordan	Babyface; Simmons; Dupri^{[A]}; Jefferson^{[B]}	4:15
5.	"Hands Up" (music video)			4:01

Notes

- ^{^[A]} denotes additional producer
- ^{^[B]} denotes additional co-producer

Sample credits

- "Hands Up" (So So Def Remix)" contains portions from "Nasty Boy" as performed by the Notorious B.I.G.

== Credits and personnel ==
Credits adapted from the liner notes of 3D.

- Babyface – writer, producer, all keyboards, drum programming, electric and acoustic guitars
- Paul Boutin – recording
- Serban Ghenea – mixing
- John Hanes – Pro Tools engineer
- Tavia Ivey – background vocals
- Debra Killings – background vocals
- Tim Roberts – assistant mix engineer
- Daryl Simmons – producer, writer
- Ivy Skoff – production coordinator
- Craig Taylor – assistant engineer
- Rozonda "Chilli" Thomas – vocals
- Tionne "T-Boz" Watkins – vocals

== Charts ==
=== Weekly charts ===
Chart (2003)	Peak position
UK Singles (OCC)	109
UK Hip Hop/R&B (Official Charts)	23
US Hot Singles Sales (Billboard)	18
US Bubbling Under R&B/Hip-Hop Singles (Billboard)	7

=== Year-end charts ===
Chart (2003)	Position
UK Urban (Music Week)	35
