= Come Get Some (TLC song) =

Single by TLC featuring Lil Jon and Sean Paul of YoungBloodZ

from the album Now & Forever: The Hits
- Released: November 17, 2003
- Recorded: 2003
- Genre: Crunk&B
- Length: 4:19
- Label: Arista
- Songwriters: Tionne Watkins; Rozonda Thomas; Jonathan Smith; Sean Paul Joseph; Craig Love; Kandi Burruss
- Producer: Lil Jon

TLC singles chronology
"Damaged" (2003)	"Come Get Some" (2003)	"I Bet" (2005)

Lil Jon singles chronology
"Salt Shaker" (2003)	"Come Get Some" (2003)	"Yeah!" (2004)

"Come Get Some" is a song by American girl group TLC. It was written by band members Tionne "T-Boz" Watkins and Rozonda "Chilli" Thomas along with Kandi Burruss, Craig Love, Sean Paul of YoungBloodZ and Lil Jon for their 2003 greatest hits album, Now & Forever: The Hits. Lil Jon produced the song and also appears with Paul as guest vocalists.

The song was released to rhythmic and urban contemporary radio on November 17, 2003, a year after the death of group member Lisa "Left Eye" Lopes. While a music video was never produced, the song was performed a few times. Lil Jon performed the song's intro on the season finale of American Idol with TLC in May 2011 and again 10 years later at the 2021 iHeartRadio Music Awards without TLC during a medley with R&B singer Usher. The song peaked at number 15 on Billboard's Hot R&B/Hip-Hop Songs chart.

== Track listing ==
US promo CD single
No.	Title	Length
1.	"Come Get Some" (Radio Mix)	4:21
2.	"Come Get Some" (A Cappella)	4:20
3.	"Come Get Some" (Instrumental)	4:19

== Credits and personnel ==
- Kandi Burruss – writer
- John Frye – engineer
- Mark Goodchild – recording engineer
- Sean Paul – vocals, writer
- Craig Love – guitar, writer
- Rozonda "Chilli" Thomas – vocals, writer
- Sam Thomas – recording engineer
- Lil Jon – mixing engineer, producer, writer
- Tionne "T-Boz" Watkins – vocals, writer

== Charts ==
Chart performance for "Come Get Some"
Chart (2003)	Peak position
US Hot R&B/Hip-Hop Songs (Billboard)	81
