= 3D (TLC album) =

2002 studio album by TLC

Studio album by TLC
- Released: October 10, 2002
- Recorded: May 2001 – July 2002
- Studios: D.A.R.P. (Atlanta) (Note: Tracks 1, 2 and 8); O'Henry Sound (Burbank, California) (Note: Tracks 1, 2, 8 and 10); PatchWerk (Atlanta) (Note: Tracks 3, 4, 6, 11 and 12); 2nd Floor (Atlanta) (Note: Track 4); Doppler (Atlanta) (Note: Tracks 4, 6 and 12); The Record Plant (Hollywood) (Note: Track 5); ZAC (Atlanta) (Note: Tracks 5, 6 and 13); Stankonia (Atlanta) (Note: Tracks 6, 12 and 13); Brandon's Way (Hollywood) (Note: Track 7); Silent Sound (Atlanta); The Tracken Place (Hollywood) (Note: Track 8); The Hit Factory Criteria (Miami) (Note: Track 9); The Dungeon (Atlanta) (Note: Track 13)
- Genres: R&B; soul
- Length: 49:32
- Label: Arista
- Producers: Dallas Austin; Babyface; Missy Elliott; Eddie Hustle; Rodney Jerkins; the Neptunes; Organized Noize; Raphael Saadiq; Daryl Simmons; Timbaland

TLC chronology
FanMail (1999)	3D (2002)	Now & Forever: The Hits (2003)

Singles from 3D
- 1. "Girl Talk" Released: October 7, 2002; 2. "Hands Up" Released: February 3, 2003; 3. "Damaged" Released: February 24, 2003

3D is the fourth studio album by American girl group TLC, released on October 10, 2002, by Arista Records. Recorded from May 2001 to July 2002, much of the album was finalized after the death of member Lisa "Left Eye" Lopes, with her unreleased material that she had recorded for her solo albums Supernova and N.I.N.A. being reworked into new songs. Remaining group members Rozonda Thomas and Tionne Watkins enlisted Dallas Austin, Babyface, Rodney Jerkins, the Neptunes, Raphael Saadiq, Missy Elliott and Timbaland to work on the album.

The album debuted at number six on the US Billboard 200 and at number four on the Top R&B/Hip-Hop Albums chart, selling 143,000 copies in its first week of release, and was met with positive reviews from critics. It has been certified platinum by the Recording Industry Association of America (RIAA). 3D earned TLC two Grammy Award nominations and spawned three singles, including "Girl Talk", peaking at number 23 on the Hot R&B/Hip-Hop Songs chart; "Hands Up", which peaked at number seven on the Bubbling Under R&B/Hip-Hop Singles chart and "Damaged", which managed to peak at number 19 on the US Mainstream Top 40 chart.

== Background information ==
During and after the release of TLC's third studio album, FanMail (1999), Lopes made it known to the press on multiple occasions that she felt that she was unable to fully express herself working with the group. Her contributions to the songs had been reduced to periodic eight-bar raps, and studio session singers such as Debra Killings often took her place on the background vocals for the group's songs. In its November 26, 1999, issue, Entertainment Weekly ran a letter from Lopes that challenged her group mates to record solo albums and let the fans judge which of the three was the most talented:

"I challenge Tionne 'Player' Watkins and Rozonda 'Hater' Thomas to an album entitled The Challenge. A 3 CD set that contains three solo albums. Each [album]... will be due to the record label by October 1, 2000... I also challenge Dallas 'The Manipulator' Austin to produce all of the material and do it at a fraction of his normal rate. As I think about it, I'm sure LaFace would not mind throwing in a 1.5 million dollar prize for the winner."

Watkins and Thomas declined to take up Lopes' challenge, though Lopes always maintained it was a great idea. Things were heated between the women for some time, with Thomas speaking out against Lopes, calling her antics "selfish", "evil", and "heartless". TLC then addressed these fights by saying that they were very much like sisters that occasionally have their disagreements; as Lopes stated, "It's deeper than a working relationship. We have feelings for each other, which is why we get so mad at each other. I usually say that you cannot hate someone unless you love them. So, we love each other. That's the problem." The women eventually settled the feud, and The Challenge was never followed through. After the conclusion of the successful FanMail Tour, the women, however, took some time off and pursued personal interests. Lopes was the first to begin recording her solo album, Supernova, though it underperformed internationally and was never released in the United States.

During this time period, Thomas had begun working on a solo project until she realized that rumors of TLC's demise had taken over in the media. It was then that Thomas made a call to LaFace label-head L.A. Reid to discuss working on TLC's fourth studio album. After contacting Watkins, and soon after, Lopes, sessions for 3D began in May 2001. However, soon after recording had begun, sessions came to a halt, as Lopes began work on her second studio album, known as N.I.N.A. (New Identity Non Applicable). In January 2002, as Watkins was hospitalized due to complications stemming from her ongoing battle with sickle cell anemia, Lopes eventually came to visit her in the hospital and went back to the studio to record raps for 3D. In April 2002, as Watkins' condition improved greatly, Lopes went to Honduras to do missionary work and also record a documentary film about her life.

On April 25, 2002, Lopes was killed in a car crash, leaving behind material that she had recorded for both N.I.N.A. and 3D. Watkins and Thomas decided to use three of Lopes' newly recorded raps that were specifically recorded for the album ("Quickie", "Girl Talk", and "Who's It Gonna Be?"); the other songs that feature her in it were unreleased raps from her solo album sessions. The unreleased vocals were featured on the songs "Quickie", "Over Me" and "Give It to Me While It's Hot".

Watkins and Thomas decided that they would complete the remainder of their fourth album, to be called 3D, which featured production from Rodney Jerkins, the Neptunes, Raphael Saadiq, Missy Elliott and Timbaland. The decision was also made that TLC would continue on as a duo rather than replace Lopes. The group went on a hiatus, but announced in 2009 that they would possibly begin recording a fifth studio album.

== Critical reception ==
Professional ratings
Aggregate scores
Source	Rating
Metacritic	71/100
Review scores
Source	Rating
AllMusic	4/5 stars
Blender	4/5 stars
Entertainment.ie	4/5 stars
Entertainment Weekly	B
Los Angeles Times	3/4 stars
New York Post	4/4 stars
Rolling Stone	4/5 stars
Slant Magazine	2.5/5 stars
Vibe	3.5/5 stars
Yahoo! Music UK	6/10

3D received generally positive reviews from music critics. At Metacritic, which assigns a normalized rating out of 100 to reviews from mainstream publications, the album received an average score of 71, based on 14 reviews. Several critics praised the album's production and its ability to continue the group's sound following the death of Lopes. Dan Aquilante of the New York Post praised 3D as "a towering record," calling it TLC's best album and highlighting its energetic production and prominent presence of Lisa "Left Eye" Lopes. Stephen Thomas Erlewine from AllMusic called it "one of the best modern soul albums of 2002" and described it as "a bittersweet triumph", writing that while 3D "perhaps doesn't blaze trails like their other albums, it never plays it safe and it always satisfies." Billboard similarly described the album as "a fitting tribute to a departed sister", calling it "a nearly perfect collection." Dorian Lynskey from Blender felt that "3D's sheer creative vibrancy is itself a testament to Lopes's live-wire charisma", while Barry Walters from Rolling Stone wrote that although the album "isn't the romp it might have been had Lopes survived", it nonetheless "solidly embodies black pop in a year in which it has lacked a center." Natalie Nichols of the Los Angeles Times likewise viewed the album positively, highlighting the group’s continued confidence and style.

Other critics offered more mixed assessments. Andy Battaglia of The A.V. Club wrote that "in spite of a slim body of songs and an occasionally half-finished feel, the group stakes a solid claim to the riches of future-soul with 3D", noting that even the weaker material is marked by "gorgeous singing built around the understated grace of '60s girl groups." David Browne of Entertainment Weekly commented that "thanks to such hired guns as the Neptunes and Rodney Jerkins, TLC have made a better post-tragedy album than expected", describing 3D as a "smorgasbord of modern R&B", though he added that it "still feels a little incomplete, like much of their work." Writing for Vibe, Dimitri Ehrlich observed that although the album is consistently well produced and performed, the material recorded before Lopes's death "is simply darker, sexier, and angrier." Jon Pareles of New York Times felt that 3D "can seem callous, with songs that act as if nothing had happened to Lopes", though he acknowledged that its determination to continue entertaining "is true to every show-business axiom." More critical responses focused on the absence of Lopes. Uncut wrote that the album revealed the "gaping hole of mischief" left by the rapper, noting that the tracks featuring her were among the strongest, while elsewhere TLC "audibly struggle." Similarly, Maddy Costa from The Guardian concluded that 3D "makes you realise that TLC, like most great bands, have always been more than the sum of their parts." Ethan Brown, writing for New York magazine, described the album as "relatively tame" but noted that "like the TLC albums that preceded it, 3D repeats their signature mix of innovative beats, sappy uplift, and tough-gal disses."

== Commercial performance ==
In the United States, 3D debuted at number six on the Billboard 200 and at number four on the Top R&B/Hip-Hop Albums chart. Selling 143,000 copies, it sold less than half of the first-week total scored by previous album FanMail (1999), which had opened at number one on the chart with 318,000 units. It also marked TLC's lowest-charting album since Ooooooohhh... On the TLC Tip (1992). On December 10, 2002, 3D was certified platinum by the Recording Industry Association of America (RIAA) for shipments in excess of one million copies. By November 2004, the album had sold 680,000 units in the United States, As of July 2017 it has sold 693,000 copies, according to Billboard.

Internationally, 3D failed to reach the top 40 on the majority of the charts it appeared on, except Canada, where it managed to debut and peak at number 31 on the Canadian Albums Chart. Nevertheless, the album was particularly successful in Japan, reaching number two on the Oricon Albums Chart and earning a platinum certification from the Recording Industry Association of Japan (RIAJ) in November 2002.

== Track listing ==
3D track listing
No.	Title	Writer(s)	Producer(s)	Length
1.	"3D" (Intro)	Dallas Austin	Austin	2:25
2.	"Quickie"	Austin; Lisa "Left Eye" Lopes; Tionne "T-Boz" Watkins	Austin	4:19
3.	"Girl Talk"	Edmund Clement; Kandi Burruss; Lopes; Anita McCloud; Watkins	Eddie Hustle	3:34
4.	"Turntable"	Rodney Jerkins; Watkins; Fred Jerkins III; Daniel Moore; LaShawn Daniels; Tomi Martin	R. Jerkins	3:25
5.	"In Your Arms Tonight"	Pharrell Williams	The Neptunes	4:24
6.	"Over Me"	R. Jerkins; Chilli; Kenisha Pratt; Moore; Tyrell Bing; Lopes	R. Jerkins	4:17
7.	"Hands Up"	Babyface; Daryl Simmons	Babyface; Simmons	3:48
8.	"Damaged"	Austin; Watkins	Austin	3:51
9.	"Dirty Dirty"	Missy Elliott; Tim Mosley	Timbaland; Elliott	3:40
10.	"So So Dumb"	Raphael Saadiq; Watkins; Glenn Standridge; Bobby Ozuna	Saadiq; Jake and the Phatman^{[a]}	4:05
11.	"Good Love"	Clement; Burruss	Hustle	4:12
12.	"Hey Hey Hey Hey"	R. Jerkins; Watkins; Burruss	R. Jerkins	4:05
13.	"Give It to Me While It's Hot"	Ray Murray; Rico Wade; Pat Brown; Marqueze Ethridge; Marvin Parkman; Stewart Jordan; Lopes; Chilli	Organized Noize	3:28

Japanese edition bonus track
No.	Title	Writer(s)	Producer(s)	Length
14.	"Get Away"	Murray; Watkins	Organized Noize	4:14

European and Taiwanese limited edition re-release deluxe DVD
No.	Title	Writer(s)	Producer(s)	Length
1.	"Girl Talk" (music video)	Clement; Burruss; Lopes; McCloud; Watkins	Hustle	3:34
2.	"Hands Up" (music video)	Babyface; Simmons	Babyface; Simmons	3:48
3.	"Damaged" (music video)	Austin; Watkins	Austin	3:51
4.	"Who's It Gonna Be?"	R. Jerkins; F. Jerkins; Daniels; Lopes	R. Jerkins	4:00
5.	"Interview Footage"

=== Notes ===
- ^{^[a]} signifies a co-producer

=== Sample credits ===
- "Quickie" contains voice samples from "Left Pimpin", a track from Lopes' unreleased N.I.N.A. album.
- "Over Me" uses a different take of a verse originally from "I Believe in Me", recorded for Supernova.
- "Give It to Me While It's Hot" reuses the second verse from "Friends", included on the Japanese edition of Supernova.

== Outtakes and leftover tracks ==
- "I Want Some of That"
  - Leaked from a promo CD full of songs Diane Warren had written. The song features T-Boz and Chilli, with Debra Killings on background vocals. It was later re-recorded by Sarah Connor for her 2003 album Key to My Soul and by Tata Young for her 2006 album Temperature Rising.
- "Whoop De Woo"
  - Released on Now and Forever: The Hits.

== Personnel ==
Credits adapted from the liner notes of 3D.

=== Musicians ===
- Dallas Austin – arrangements (tracks 1, 2, 8)
- Rick Sheppard – MIDI, sound design (tracks 1, 8)
- Chilli – background vocals (tracks 1–5, 7–13)
- Tionne "T-Boz" Watkins – background vocals (tracks 1–5, 7–13)
- Debra Killings – background vocals (tracks 1–4, 6–8, 10, 12, 13); bass (track 4)
- Marde Johnson – additional vocals (track 1); background vocals (track 9)
- Tierra Johnson – additional vocals (track 1)
- Sharliss Asbury – additional vocals (track 1)
- Jasper Cameron – additional vocals (track 1)
- Cindy Pace – additional background vocals (track 2)
- Eddie Hustle – all instruments (tracks 3, 11)
- Rodney Jerkins – all music (tracks 4, 6, 12); drum overdubs (track 4); intro vocals (track 6); intro (track 12)
- Tomi Martin – guitar (track 4)
- Danny O'Donoghue – guitar (track 4)
- Alex Greggs – drum overdubs (track 4)
- Riprock n Alex G – digital programming (track 4)
- Pharrell Williams – all instruments (track 5)
- Chad Hugo – all instruments (track 5)
- Tron Austin – intro vocals (track 6)
- Lisa "Left Eye" Lopes – rap (track 6)
- Babyface – all keyboards, drum programming, electric guitar, acoustic guitar (track 7)
- Tavia Ivey – background vocals (track 7)
- Tony Reyes – guitar (track 8)
- Colin Wolfe – bass (track 8)
- Sigurdur Birkis – drums (track 8)
- Tom Knight – drums (track 8)
- DJ Ruckus – scratches (track 8)
- Missy Elliott – background vocals (track 9)
- Chase Rollison – background vocals (track 9)
- Lester Finnel – background vocals (track 9)
- Bill Diggins – background vocals (track 9)
- Mark Pitts – background vocals (track 9)
- Shawn Beasley – background vocals (track 9)
- Raphael Saadiq – guitar, bass (track 10)
- Jake and the Phatman – drum programming (track 10)
- Kelvin Wooten – keyboards (track 10)
- Organized Noize – arrangements, drum programming, music programming (track 13)
- Shorty B – bass (track 13)
- Marqueze Ethridge – vocal arrangement (track 13)
- Chanz Parkman – vocal arrangement (track 13)

=== Technical ===
- Dallas Austin – production (tracks 1, 2, 8); executive production
- Carlton Lynn – recording (tracks 1, 2, 8); Pro Tools engineering (track 8)
- Rick Sheppard – recording (tracks 1, 2, 8)
- Tim Lauber – engineering assistance (tracks 1, 10)
- Paul Sheehy – engineering assistance (tracks 1, 2, 8)
- Kevin "KD" Davis – mixing (tracks 1–3, 8, 11)
- Dion Peters – mix engineering assistance (tracks 1–3, 8, 11)
- Christine Sirois – engineering assistance (track 2)
- Eddie Hustle – production (tracks 3, 11)
- Josh Butler – recording (tracks 3, 11)
- Leslie Brathwaite – recording (tracks 3, 4, 6, 10–12); mixing (track 4)
- Steve Fisher – engineering assistance (tracks 3, 4, 11, 12); recording (track 12)
- Rodney Jerkins – production, vocal production, mixing (tracks 4, 6, 12)
- Fabian Marasciullo – recording (tracks 4, 6, 12)
- Mark "DJ Exit" Goodchild – recording (tracks 4, 6, 12)
- The Neptunes – production (track 5)
- Andrew "Drew" Coleman – recording (track 5)
- Brian Garten – recording (track 5)
- Frannie Graham – engineering assistance (track 5)
- Cedric Anderson – engineering assistance (track 5)
- Phil Tan – mixing (track 5)
- John Horesco IV – mix engineering assistance (track 5)
- Jean-Marie Horvat – mixing (tracks 6, 12)
- Babyface – production (track 7)
- Daryl Simmons – production (track 7)
- Paul Boutin – recording (track 7)
- Craig Taylor – engineering assistance (track 7)
- Serban Ghenea – mixing (tracks 7, 13)
- Tim Roberts – mix engineering assistance (track 7)
- John Hanes – Pro Tools engineering (track 7)
- Ivy Skoff – production coordination (track 7)
- Doug Harms – engineering assistance (track 8)
- Victor McCoy – engineering assistance (track 8)
- Timbaland – production, mixing (track 9)
- Missy Elliott – production (track 9)
- Carlos "El Loco" Bedoya – recording (track 9)
- Jimmy Douglas – mixing (track 9)
- Raphael Saadiq – production (track 10)
- Jake and the Phatman – co-production (track 10)
- Gerry "The Gov" Brown – mixing (track 10)
- John Tanksley – mix engineering assistance (track 10)
- Anette Sharvit – production coordination (track 10)
- Cory Williams – engineering assistance (track 12)
- Organized Noize – production (track 13)
- Sean Davis – recording (track 13)
- John Frye – recording (track 13)
- Morgan Garcia – recording (track 13)
- Lisa "Left Eye" Lopes – album production
- Chilli – album production
- Tionne "T-Boz" Watkins – album production
- Bill Diggins – album production
- Herb Powers Jr. – mastering
- TLC – executive production
- Antonio "L.A." Reid – executive production

=== Artwork ===
- Joe Mama-Nitzberg – creative direction
- Jeff Schulz – art direction, design
- Seb Janiak – cover photo, Lisa "Left Eye" Lopes photo
- Guy Aroch – inside photo

== Charts ==
=== Weekly charts ===
Weekly chart performance for 3D
Chart (2002)	Peak position
Australian Albums (ARIA)	73
Australian Urban Albums (ARIA)	9
Canadian Albums (Nielsen SoundScan)	31
Canadian R&B Albums (Nielsen SoundScan)	15
Dutch Albums (Album Top 100)	62
European Albums (Music & Media)	75
French Albums (SNEP)	101
German Albums (Offizielle Top 100)	46
Japanese Albums (Oricon)	2
New Zealand Albums (RMNZ)	45
Scottish Albums (Official Charts)	60
Swiss Albums (Schweizer Hitparade)	47
UK Albums (Official Charts)	45
UK R&B Albums (Official Charts)	9
US Billboard 200	6
US Top R&B/Hip-Hop Albums (Billboard)	4

=== Year-end charts ===
2002 year-end chart performance for 3D
Chart (2002)	Position
Canadian R&B Albums (Nielsen SoundScan)	60
Canadian Rap Albums (Nielsen SoundScan)	32

2003 year-end chart performance for 3D
Chart (2003)	Position
US Billboard 200	144
US Top R&B/Hip-Hop Albums (Billboard)	61

== Certifications ==
Certifications for 3D
Region	Certification	Certified units/sales
Japan (RIAJ)	Platinum	200,000^{^}
United States (RIAA)	Platinum	693,000
^{^} Shipments figures based on certification alone.

== Release history ==
Release history for 3D
Region	Date	Label
Europe	October 10, 2002	Arista
Japan	November 6, 2002	Arista
United States	November 12, 2002	Arista
