= Girl Talk (TLC song) =

Single by TLC

from the album 3D
- B-side: "Get Away"
- Released: October 7, 2002
- Studio: Patchwork Studios (Atlanta, GA)
- Length: 3:35
- Label: Arista
- Songwriters: Lisa Lopes; Anita McLoud; Edmund Clement; Kandi Burruss; Tionne Watkins
- Producer: Eddie Hustle

TLC singles chronology
"What It Ain't (Ghetto Enuff)" (2000)	"Girl Talk" (2002)	"Hands Up" (2002)

"Girl Talk" is a song by American group TLC. It was written by group members Lisa "Left Eye" Lopes and Tionne "T-Boz" Watkins along with Anita McLoud, Edmund "Eddie Hustle" Clement, and Kandi Burruss for the group's fourth studio album, 3D (2002). Recorded a few days before Lopes' death in April 2002, production on the song was helmed by Clement. Lyrically, "Girl Talk" has the protagonist warning men that if they lack in the bedroom, it will spread on the street amongst the women.

The song was released as the album's lead single on October 7, 2002. While the song contains vocals by Lopes, the music video for "Girl Talk", directed by Dave Meyers, marked the group's first release without Lopes, following her death in April of the same year. Upon its release, "Girl Talk" reached number 23 on the US Billboard's Hot R&B/Hip-Hop Songs chart and number 28 on the Billboard Hot 100, becoming the group's 12th top 40 entry on the latter chart. In addition, the song reached the top 20 in Denmark and New Zealand, the top 30 in the UK and the top 50 in Australia.

== Background ==
"Girl Talk" was written by TLC members Lisa Lopes and Tionne Watkins along with Anita McLoud, Edmund "Eddie Hustle" Clement, and Kandi Burruss, while production was helmed by Clement. On the song, the trio address being disappointed by their "jive-talking lovers", singing: "Put in work / 'cause if you don't, that girl just gonna go spreading the word [...] Girls talk about the booty too." Watkins and Rozonda Thomas called it "controversial". In an interview with MTV News they further elaborated: "It's talking about [...] all the stereotypes of men, with the big hands and big feet. Just because you have big hands and big feet does not mean you have big thaaangs [...] And just because you have a big thing does not mean you know how to work it. Some people always say they have big things and they don't. And just like how men talk about women — 'I had her, I had her' — we talk about you, too." In 2019, rapper Dashun "Eastwood" Woodard, who had ghost written and was featured on Lopes' verse on "Girl Talk", told Variety that her vocals were recorded three days before her death.

== Critical reception ==
Chuck Taylor from Billboard called the song "one solid, signature track" and "a return to celebrate". He found that "Girl Talk" was a "lot more than a tribute to the memory of Lopes", with TLC showing "its younger contemporaries how to make some real music, marrying a bumpy, funky street jam with a wonderfully singable melody, chantlike hook [...] a vocal oozing with attitude, and a center-section rap from Left Eye." In his review for parent album 3D, BBC Music editor Christian Hopwood remarked that "Quickie" and "Girl Talk" are "upfront party jams propelled by bare faced cheek and female power." People magazine called "Girl Talk" a "funky, fresh-mouthed first single". Pan-European music publication Music & Media, although noting the simplicity of the beats, highlighted the "sassy, scathing lyrics" that reflected the "CrazySexyCool-style that made them famous."

== Music video ==
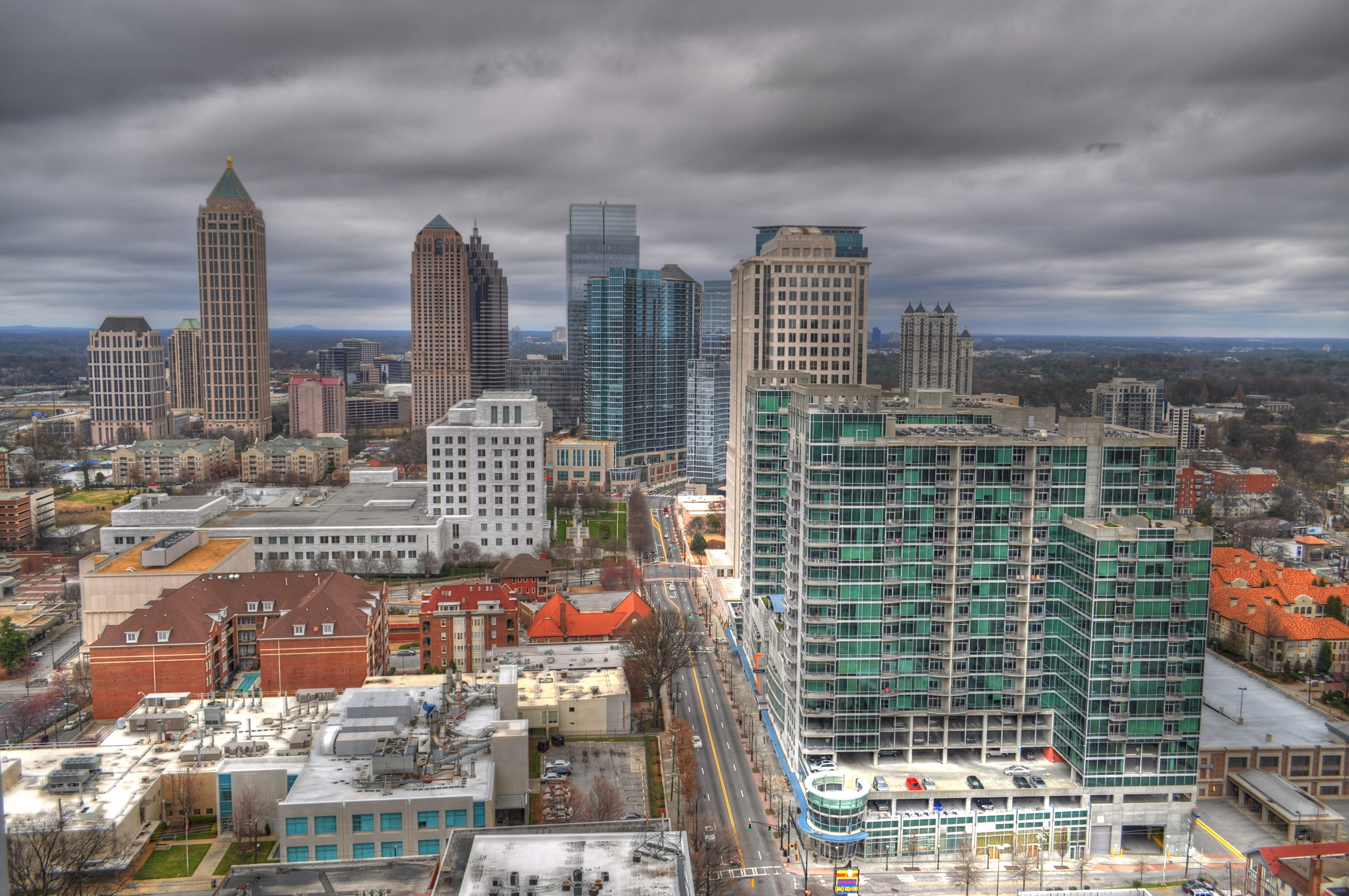
The music video for "Girl Talk" was filmed in various locations in Atlanta.

A music video for "Girl Talk" was directed by Dave Meyers and filmed in Atlanta, Georgia on October 21–23, 2002, six months after Lisa Lopes' death. The video depicts the two remaining members, Watkins and Thomas, in several locations that are supposed to take place in the Southern United States, in an African rain forest and in a metropolitan area in Japan, dancing and talking with other girls, representing how girls all over the world "are chatting amongst themselves about guys who are no good in the bedroom." An animated segment is used during Lopes's rap verse, where all three girls appear as cartoon versions of themselves. The video ends with a tribute to Left Eye, reading: "In Loving Memory of Lisa 'Left Eye' Lopes".

Regardings Lopes' absence, Watkins remarked that "it was hard to come up with ideas [for the video]" after her death. In an interview with MTV News, she said: "She isn't here. That's reality. It's not easy to come up with how to incorporate her, especially when she has a whole rap in the song." Thomas further commented: "What we didn't want to do is [make] your typical video [where] you see old clips. Sometimes, stuff like that fits certain songs, but to show old clips of Lisa didn't fit "Girl Talk." What you'll get from the video is no matter where you go [and whatever language you speak], women will talk about men."

== Track listing ==
European, Australian, South African, and Japanese CD maxi single
No.	Title	Writer(s)	Producer(s)	Length
1.	"Girl Talk" (Radio Mix)	Lisa Lopes; Anita McLoud; Edmund Clement; Kandi Burruss; Tionne Watkins	Eddie Hustle	3:37
2.	"Girl Talk" (Jacknife Lee Remix)	Lopes; McLoud; Clement; Burruss; Watkins	Hustle; Jacknife Lee^{[a]}	3:50
3.	"Girl Talk" (Kidstuff Vocal Mix)	Lopes; McLoud; Clement; Burruss; Watkins	Hustle; Kevin "K-Boy" Brookes^{[a]}; Mark Wilkinson^{[a]}; Paul Jackson^{[a]}	7:53
4.	"Get Away"	Marqueze Ethridge; Marvin Parkman; McKinley Horton; Pat Brown; Preston Crump; Rico Wade; Ray Murray	Organized Noize	4:14

UK CD single 1, UK 12" single
No.	Title	Writer(s)	Producer(s)	Length
1.	"Girl Talk" (Radio Mix)	Lopes; McLoud; Clement; Burruss; Watkins	Hustle	3:37
2.	"Girl Talk" (Jacknife Lee Remix)	Lopes; McLoud; Clement; Burruss; Watkins	Hustle; Lee^{[a]}	3:50
3.	"Girl Talk" (Kidstuff Vocal Mix)	Lopes; McLoud; Clement; Burruss; Watkins	Hustle; Brookes^{[a]}; Wilkinson^{[a]}; Jackson^{[a]}	7:53

UK CD single 2
No.	Title	Writer(s)	Producer(s)	Length
1.	"Girl Talk" (Radio Mix)	Lopes; McLoud; Clement; Burruss; Watkins	Hustle	3:37
2.	"Waterfalls"	Ethridge; Brown; Wade; Murray	Organized Noize	4:36
3.	"No Scrubs"	Kevin "She'kspere" Briggs; Burruss; Tameka "Tiny" Cottle; Lopes	She'kspere	3:39

European CD single
No.	Title	Writer(s)	Producer(s)	Length
1.	"Girl Talk" (Radio Mix)	Lopes; McLoud; Clement; Burruss; Watkins	Hustle	3:37
2.	"Girl Talk" (Jacknife Lee Remix)	Lopes; McLoud; Clement; Burruss; Watkins	Hustle; Lee^{[a]}	3:50

US 12" single
No.	Title	Writer(s)	Producer(s)	Length
1.	"Girl Talk" (Radio Mix)	Lopes; McLoud; Clement; Burruss; Watkins	Hustle	3:37
2.	"Girl Talk" (Instrumental)	Lopes; McLoud; Clement; Burruss; Watkins	Hustle	3:34
3.	"Girl Talk" (Radio Mix)	Lopes; McLoud; Clement; Burruss; Watkins	Hustle	3:37
4.	"Girl Talk" (A cappella)	Lopes; McLoud; Clement; Burruss; Watkins	Hustle	3:17

US DVD single
No.	Title	Length
1.	"Hands Up" (Music video)	4:01
2.	"Girl Talk" (Music video)	3:34
3.	"Photo gallery slideshow"	0:32

Notes

- ^{^[a]} denotes additional producer

== Credits and personnel ==
Credits lifted from the liner notes of 3D.

- Leslie Braithwaite – recording engineer
- Kandi Burruss – writer
- Josh Butler – recording engineer
- Edmund "Eddie Hustle" Clement – producer, writer
- Kevin Davis – mixing engineer
- Steve Fisher – engineering assistant
- Debra Killings – background vocals
- Lisa "Left Eye" Lopes – vocals, writer
- Anita McLoud – writer
- Dion Peters – engineering assistant
- Rozonda "Chilli" Thomas – vocals
- Tionne "T-Boz" Watkins – vocals, writer

== Charts ==
=== Weekly charts ===
Weekly chart performance for "Girl Talk"
Chart (2002)	Peak position
Australia (ARIA)	46
Australian Urban (ARIA)	15
Belgium (Ultratip Bubbling Under Flanders)	5
Belgium (Ultratip Bubbling Under Wallonia)	14
Denmark (Tracklisten)	13
Europe (European Hot 100 Singles)	78
European Radio (Music & Media)	27
Germany (GfK)	79
Ireland (IRMA)	46
Italy (FIMI)	49
Netherlands (Dutch Top 40 Tipparade)	5
Netherlands (Single Top 100)	54
New Zealand (Recorded Music NZ)	18
Scottish Singles Sales (Official Charts)	42
Switzerland (Schweizer Hitparade)	96
UK Singles (Official Charts)	30
UK Hip Hop/R&B (Official Charts)	9
US Billboard Hot 100	28
US Hot R&B/Hip-Hop Songs (Billboard)	23
US Pop Airplay (Billboard)	21
US Rhythmic Airplay (Billboard)	15
US CHR/Pop (Radio & Records)	22
US CHR/Rhythmic (Radio & Records)	18
US Rhythmic Mix Show (Radio & Records)	23
US Urban (Radio & Records)	14

=== Year-end charts ===
Chart (2002)	Position
UK Urban (Music Week)	17

== Release history ==
Release dates and format(s) for "Girl Talk"
Region	Date	Format(s)	Label(s)	Ref.
United States	October 7, 2002	Contemporary hit; rhythmic; urban contemporary radio	Arista	
Europe	October 21, 2002	Radio airplay	Arista	
United Kingdom	December 2, 2002	CD; cassette single	Arista	
