= Da Brat discography =

This is the discography of the American rapper Da Brat.

== Studio albums ==
List of studio albums, with selected chart positions and certifications
Title	Album details	Peak chart positions			Certifications
Title	Album details	US	US R&B /HH	NLD	Certifications
Funkdafied	Released: June 28, 1994; Label: So So Def, Columbia; Format: CD, LP, cassette, digital download	11	1	—	RIAA: Platinum
Anuthatantrum	Released: October 29, 1996; Label: So So Def, Columbia; Format: CD, LP, cassette, digital download	20	5	—	RIAA: Gold
Unrestricted	Released: April 11, 2000; Label: So So Def, Columbia; Format: CD, LP, digital download	5	1	55	RIAA: Platinum
Limelite, Luv & Niteclubz	Released: July 15, 2003; Label: So So Def, Arista; Format: CD, LP, digital download	17	6	—	
"—" denotes a recording that did not chart or was not released in that territory.

== Singles ==
=== As lead artist ===
List of singles, with selected chart positions and certifications, showing year released and album name
Title	Year	Peak chart positions								Certifications	Album
Title	Year	US	US R&B	US Rap	BEL	FRA	NLD	NZ	UK	Certifications	Album
"Funkdafied"	1994	6	2	1	—	42	—	17	65	RIAA: Platinum	Funkdafied
"Fa All Y'all"	1994	37	18	5	—	—	—	—	—		Funkdafied
"Give It 2 You"	1995	26	11	3	—	—	—	—	—	RIAA: Gold	Funkdafied
"Sittin' on Top of the World"	1996	30	18	3	—	—	—	21	—	RIAA: Gold	Anuthatantrum
"Ghetto Love" (featuring T-Boz)	1997	16	11	4	—	—	—	—	—	RIAA: Gold	Anuthatantrum
"It's Nothing" (with Jermaine Dupri featuring The R.O.C.)	1999	—	—	—	—	—	—	—	—		The PJs OST
"That's What I'm Looking For"	2000	56	18	11	—	—	—	—	—		Unrestricted
"What'chu Like" (featuring Tyrese)	2000	26	9	11	31	—	9	—	—		Unrestricted
"We Ready" (featuring Jermaine Dupri and Lil Jon)	2000	—	—	—	—	—	—	—	—		Unrestricted
"In Love wit Chu" (featuring Cherish)	2003	44	32	12	—	—	99	11	—		Limelite, Luv & Niteclubz
"Boom (Remixes)"	2003	—	—	—	—	—	—	—	—		Limelite, Luv & Niteclubz
"Is It Chu?"	2013	—	—	—	—	—	—	—	—		Non-album singles
"YAK (You Already Know)" (featuring Sage the Gemini and Eric Bellinger)	2015	—	—	—	—	—	—	—	—		Non-album singles
"F U Pay Me" (with Jermaine Dupri featuring The-Dream)	2016	—	—	—	—	—	—	—	—		The Return
"Alessandro Michele" (with Jermaine Dupri)	2016	—	—	—	—	—	—	—	—		The Return
"—" denotes a recording that did not chart or was not released in that territory.

=== As featured artist ===
Year	Title	Chart positions						Album
Year	Title	US	US R&B	US Rap	UK	NZ	NLD	Album
1994	"Da Bomb" (Kris Kross featuring Da Brat)	—	—	—	—	—	—	Non-album single
1995	"No One Else" (Puff Daddy Remix) (Total featuring Da Brat, Lil' Kim and Foxy Brown)	45	2	11	—	3	117	Total
1996	"Live & Die for Hip Hop" (Kris Kross featuring Mr. Black, Aaliyah, J.D. and Da Brat)	—	—	—	—	—	—	Young, Rich & Dangerous
1997	"Not Tonight" (Ladies Night Remix) (Lil' Kim featuring Da Brat, Angie Martinez, Left Eye and Missy Elliott)	6	3	1	10	4	31	Nothing to Lose (soundtrack)
1997	"In My Bed" (So So Def Remix) (Dru Hill featuring J.D. and Da Brat)	—	—	—	—	—	—	Non-album single
1997	"Sock It 2 Me" (Missy Elliott featuring Da Brat)	12	4	3	32	33	5	Supa Dupa Fly
1997	"The Way That You Talk" (Jagged Edge featuring Da Brat and Jermaine Dupri)	65	34	—	—	—	—	A Jagged Era
1998	"The Party Continues" (Jermaine Dupri featuring Da Brat and Usher)	29	14	6	28	—	—	Life in 1472
1999	"I Still Believe/Pure Imagination" (Damizza Remix) (Mariah Carey featuring Krayzie Bone and Da Brat)	79	30	111	20	90	7	Non-album single
1999	"Secret Love" (Kelly Price featuring Da Brat and Jermaine Dupri)	99	3	—	—	—	—	Soul of a Woman
1999	"U Don't Know Me (Remix)" (Brandy featuring Shaunta, Da Brat and Eve)	—	—	—	—	—	—	Non-album singles
1999	"Heartbreaker" (So So Def Remix) (Mariah Carey featuring DJ Clue, Missy Elliott and Da Brat)	—	—	—	—	—	—	Non-album singles
2001	"Survivor" (Remix) (Destiny's Child featuring Da Brat)	—	—	—	—	—	—	Non-album singles
2001	"Loverboy" (Remix) (Mariah Carey featuring Da Brat, Ludacris, Shawnna, Twenty II, and Cameo)	2	1	—	12	—	34	Glitter
2001	"Where the Party At" (Remix) (Jagged Edge featuring Nelly, Jermaine Dupri, Da Brat, Lil' Bow Wow, R.O.C and Tigah)	—	—	—	—	—	—	Non-album single
2003	"Miss P." (Cherish featuring Da Brat)	—	87	—	—	—	—	The Moment
2005	"I Think They Like Me" (So So Def Remix) (Dem Franchize Boyz featuring Da Brat, Jermaine Dupri & Bow Wow)	15	1	4	66	27	—	On Top of Our Game

== Music videos ==
Year	Video	Director
1994	"Funkdafied"	David Nelson
1994	"Fa All Y'All"	Ken Fox
1995	"Give It 2 You" (Remix)	Michael Merriman
1996	"Sittin' on Top of the World"	Richard Murray
1997	"Ghetto Love" (w/T-Boz)	Gustavo Garzon
2000	"What'chu Like" (w/Tyrese)	Michael Salomon
2000	"That's What I'm Looking For"	Dave Meyers
2003	"In Love wit Chu" (w/Cherish)	Bryan Barber

== Guest appearances ==
Year	Title	Artist(s)	Album
1995	"Da B Side"	Da Brat & The Notorious B.I.G.	Bad Boys (soundtrack)
1996	"Always Be My Baby" (Mr. Dupri Mix)	Mariah Carey feat. Da Brat & Xscape	Always Be My Baby
1997	"Honey" (So So Def Mix)	Mariah Carey feat. Da Brat & Jermaine Dupri	Butterfly
1998	"Don't Hate on Me"	Jermaine Dupri feat. Da Brat & Krayzie Bone	Life In 1472
1998	"All That's Got to Go"	Jermaine Foolery feat. Da Brat and Latocha Scott	Life In 1472
1999	"One Day"	Lords of the Underground feat. Da Brat	Resurrection
1999	"I Put You On"	Keith Sweat feat. Da Brat	Blue Streak (soundtrack)
1999	"Stickin' Chickens"	Missy Elliott feat. Da Brat and Aaliyah	Da Real World
1999	"Thorough Sisters"	Charli Baltimore feat. Da Brat, Scarlet, Gangsta Boo, Lady of Rage & Queen Pen	Cold as Ice
2000	"You Know Me"	Lil' Bow Wow feat. Jermaine Dupri & Da Brat	Beware of Dog
2000	"Come See About Me"	Mystikal feat. Da Brat & Petey Pablo	Let's Get Ready
2000	"That's What I'm Looking For" (Remix)	Da Brat, J.D., Missy Elliott	Big Momma's House (soundtrack)
2000	"Big Momma's Theme"	Da Brat, Vita, Destiny's Child	Big Momma's House (soundtrack)
2000	"Jumpin' Jumpin'" (Remix)	Destiny's Child feat. Lil' Bow Wow, Jermaine Dupri& Da Brat	This Is the Remix
2000	"Road Dawgs"	DJ Clue feat. Da Brat, Jay-Z, Amil & Eve	Backstage: Music Inspired by the Film
2000	"Like Whoa!" (All-Star Remix)	Black Rob feat. Rah Digga, Lil' Cease, G-Dep, Da Brat, Beanie Sigel, Shyne, Petey Pablo, Mad Rapper & P. Diddy	Life Story
2000	"How a Thug Like It"	C-Murder feat. Da Brat	Trapped In Crime
2001	"In My Life"	Millie Jackson feat. Da Brat	Not for Church Folk!
2001	"Crazy"	Lil' Bow Wow feat. Da Brat	Doggy Bag
2001	"Slap! Slap! Slap!"	Missy Elliott feat. Da Brat & Ms. Jade	Miss E...So Addictive
2001	"Gangsta Bitches"	Eve feat. Da Brat & Trina	Scorpion
2001	"You Bring da Freak out of Me"	Jermaine Duper feat. Da Brat & Kandi	Instructions
2001	"Broke the Rules"	So Plush feat. Da Brat	So Plush / The Essential
2001	"We Know"	Cappadonna feat. Da Brat & Jermaine Dupri	The Yin and the Yang
2002	"Naïve"	Solange feat. Beyoncé & Da Brat	Solo Star
2003	"Street Life" (Remix)	Beenie Man feat. Da Brat & Jermaine Dupri	Street Life
2005	"Girlfight" (Remix)	Brooke Valentine, Lil Jon, Remy Ma, Miss B	Girlfight
2005	"Oh, I Think They Like Me" (So So Def Remix)	Dem Franchize Boyz feat. Jermaine Dupri, Da Brat & Bow Wow	On Top of Our Game
2006	"Damn Thing"	Bow Wow feat. Da Brat	The Price of Fame
2006	"I Used to Think I Was Run" (Remix)	Rev. Run feat. Jermaine Dupri, Da Brat & Short Dawg	I Used to Think I Was Run
2007	"Ice Box" (Remix)	Omarion feat. Da Brat	Ice Box
2007	"Gotsa Go Pt. 1"	Kelly Rowland feat. Da Brat	Ms. Kelly
2007	"Let It Go"	Kelly Rowland feat. Da Brat & Foxy Brown	
2007	"Youngin"	Lil' Mo feat. Da Brat	
2008	"4real4real"	Mariah Carey feat. Da Brat	E=MC²
2009	"Marching Band"	Tay Dizm feat. T-Pain & Da Brat	
2014	"Loyalty"	Lil' Mo feat. Da Brat	No Shit Sherlock
2014	"100"	Demetria McKinney feat. Da Brat	
