= Limelite, Luv & Niteclubz =

Studio album by Da Brat
- Released: July 15, 2003
- Length: 47:13
- Labels: So So Def; Arista
- Producers: Da Brat; Jermaine Dupri; L.T. Hutton

Da Brat chronology
Unrestricted (2000)	Limelite, Luv & Niteclubz (2003)

Singles from Limelite, Luv & Niteclubz
- 1. "In Love wit Chu" Released: June 8, 2003; 2. "Boom" Released: August 5, 2003

Limelite, Luv & Niteclubz is the fourth studio album by American rapper Da Brat. It was released by So So Def and Arista Records on July 15, 2003 in the United States, following So So Def's transition from Columbia Records. For the album, Da Brat collaborated mainly with producer L.T. Hutton, alongside contributions from Jermaine Dupri, and included guest appearances from several prominent R&B artists, describing the project as a bold release intended to surprise audiences.

Critics generally viewed the album as a more mature and polished presentation, highlighting Da Brat's lyrical skill and production quality while noting its inconsistency. Limelite, Luv & Niteclubz debuted at number 17 on the US Billboard 200 with 39,000 first-week sales, a sharp drop from her previous album Unrestricted, but still reached number six on the Top R&B/Hip-Hop Albums chart. The album produced two singles, including "In Love wit Chu" featuring female R&B group Cherish.

== Background ==
In April 2000, Da Brat released her second studio album Unrestricted on So So Def Recordings and Columbia Records. It opened at number four on the US Billboard 200 and produced the R&B top ten hit "What'chu Like," eventually selling 915,000 copies domestically. In January 2003, So So Def head Jermaine Dupri moved his label to Arista Records. For her next project with Dupri, Da Brat teamed up with L.T. Hutton, who would produce the majority of Limelite, Luv & Niteclubz, with Dupri also contributing a number of songs. Other guest performances on the album include R&B girl band Cherish, Anthony Hamilton, Keisha Jackson, Cee-Lo Green, and Mariah Carey, with whom Da Brat previously co-starred in the latter's feature film Glitter. Commenting on the albun, Da Brat told Billboard magazine in April 2003: "I'm shocking a lot of people this go [a]round and this album is on fire."

== Singles ==
Released on June 8, 2003, "In Love wit Chu" featuring R&B group Cherish served as the lead single from this album. In the United States, the song peaked at number nine on Billboard's Rhythmic chart. It also peacked at number 11 on the New Zealand Singles Chart and reached the top thirty in Canada. A music video for "In Love wit Chu," directed by Bryan Barber, features cameo appearances by Mariah Carey, boxer Roy Jones Jr., and Jermaine Dupri. A second single "Boom", was released on August 5, 2003.

== Critical reception ==
Professional ratings
Review scores
Source	Rating
AllMusic	3/5 stars
Entertainment Weekly	C−
New York Post	3.5/4 stars
RapReviews	6/10
The Rolling Stone Album Guide	2.5/5 stars
USA Today	3/4 stars
Vibe	3/5 marks

Billboard wrote that Da Brat "continues to evolve on her fourth So So Def set. Long gone is the tomboy MC who made her debut in 1994 with Funkdafied. In her place a female MC who ably walks the fine line between femininity and ferocity with the best of them [...] Whether she's running with the boys or pining over them, Da Brat remains one of the better female MCs in the game." Steve Jones from USA Today noted that with the album Da Brat was presenting herself "sexier and edgier than ever," while Dan Aquilante from The New York Post concluded: "With Limelite, Luv & Niteclubz Da Brat, again proves herself one of the wittiest, most nimble-tongued emcees in hip-hop [...] Limelite shows the Chicago native has matured lyrically, yet Da Brat still loves to provoke." Dan Aquilante of the New York Post praised the material for Da Brat's witty lyricism, nimble delivery and provocative humor.

Akiba J. Solomon, writing for Vibe, found that the album "reeks (in a good way) of the production expertise of Jermaine Dupri. The lead single , "In Love Wit Chu," is nice. But there's more ear candy on this set that resonates with Da Brat's trademark hardcore and funky flow." Entertainment Weekly's Jonah Weiner wrote that with Limelite, Luv & Niteclubz, Da Brat "tries to expand into lovebird territory ("In Love Wit Chu"), but she’s too brash to pull it off. She is fabulously evil as a housewrecker on "Boom," but threats elsewhere ring hollow. Despite some impressive double-time rhymes ("World Premiere"), good lines are rare, and her staccato clatter grates." AllMusic editor Andy Kellman rated the album three out of five starts. He found that "there's no getting past the fact that the album is just as pockmarked with average material as Unrestricted. Despite this, no song is certifiably weak."

== Commercial performance ==
Limelite, Luv & Niteclubz debuted and peaked number 17 on the US Billboard 200, with first week sales of 39,000 copies. Limelite, Luv & Niteclubz also opened and peaked at number six on Billboard's Top R&B/Hip-Hop Albums chart.

== Track listing ==
Limelite, Luv & Niteclubz track listing
No.	Title	Writer(s)	Producer(s)	Length
1.	"World Premier" (featuring M.O.P., Jermaine Dupri, and Q da Kid)	Shawntae Harris; Eric Murry; Jamal Grinnage; Dupri; Kareem Savage	Dupri	3:15
2.	"In Love wit Chu" (featuring Cherish)	Harris; L.T. Hutton	Hutton; Da Brat	4:08
3.	"Ain't Got Time to Waste"	Harris; Dupri; Manuel Seal	Dupri; Seal^{[a]}	4:08
4.	"Gotta Thing for You" (featuring Mariah Carey)	Harris; Alfons Kettner; Robert Caldwell; Hutton	Hutton; Da Brat	5:03
5.	"Who I Am"	Harris; Freddie Byrd; Dupri; Seal	Dupri; Seal^{[a]}	4:44
6.	"Boom"	Harris; Danny Spohn; Juan Albelo; Hutton; Rosalyn McCall; Steven Blount	Hutton; Da Brat	4:09
7.	"Got It Poppin'"	Harris; Darryl McDaniels; James Phillips; Dupri; Joseph Simmons; Lawrence Smith	Dupri; LRoc^{[a]}	3:52
8.	"Chuch" (featuring Cee-Lo)	Harris; L.T. Hutton	Hutton; Da Brat	4:28
9.	"Get Somebody" (featuring Keisha Jackson)	Harris; L.T. Hutton	Hutton; Da Brat	4:20
10.	"I Was the One" (featuring Anthony Hamilton)	Harris; L.T. Hutton	Hutton; Da Brat	4:40
11.	"Gushy Wushy"	Harris; L.T. Hutton	Hutton; Da Brat	3:59

Notes

- ^{^[a]}signifies a co-producer

Sample credits

- "Gotta Thing for You" contains replayed elements from "What You Won't Do for Love" (1978) as performed by Bobby Caldwell.
- "Who I Am" contains re-sung elements from "Cha Cha Cha" (1989) as performed by MC Lyte.
- "Boom" contains re-sung elements from "Boom! I Got Your Boyfriend" (1988) as performed by MC Luscious.
- "Got It Poppin'" contains excerpts from "Darryl And Joe (Krush-Groove 3)" (1985) as performed by Run DMC.

== Charts ==
Chart performance for Limelite, Luv & Niteclubz
Chart (2003)	Peak position
US Billboard 200	17
US Top R&B/Hip-Hop Albums (Billboard)	6
