= Do G's Get to Go to Heaven? =

"Do G's Get To Go To Heaven?"

Single by Richie Rich

from the album Seasoned Veteran
- Released: February 11, 1997
- Recorded: 1996
- Genre: West Coast hip hop, Rap, Gangsta rap
- Length: 14:25
- Label: Def Jam
- Songwriter(s): Richie Rich
- Producer(s): Mike Mosley

Richie Rich singles chronology
"Let's Ride" (1996)	"Do G's Get To Go To Heaven?" (1997)	"If..." (1999)

"Do G's Get to Go to Heaven" is the second single from Richie Rich's third studio album Seasoned Veteran. The single was released February 11, 1997 on Def Jam Recordings and features backing vocals by Bo-Roc and Ephriam Galloway. It peaked at number 10 on the Billboard Rap Songs, at number 57 on the Billboard Hot 100, and at number 73 on the Billboard Hot R&B/Hip-Hop Songs. The song is dedicated to the memory of Tupac Shakur.

Along with the single, a music video was produced to promote the album.

== Track listing ==
1. "Do G's Get to Go to Heaven?" (Radio Edit)
2. "Do G's Get to Go to Heaven?" (LP Version)
3. "Do G's Get to Go to Heaven?" (Instrumental)

== Chart history ==
Chart (1997)	Peak position
U.S. Billboard Hot 100	57
U.S. Billboard Hot R&B/Hip-Hop Songs	37
U.S. Billboard Rap Songs	10
