= Greatest Hits (Richie Rich album) =

Greatest hits album by Richie Rich
- Released: April 25, 2000
- Recorded: 1988–1990
- Genre: West Coast hip hop; G-funk; gangsta rap
- Length: 57:23
- Label: Big League
- Producer: DJ Daryl; J.E.D.

Richie Rich chronology
Big League Records Greatest Hits (1999)	Greatest Hits (Richie Rich album) (2000)	The Game (2000)

Professional ratings
Review scores
Source	Rating
AllMusic	4/5 stars

Greatest Hits is a compilation album of previously released material from American rapper Richie Rich. The project contains songs from the 415 debut album (41Fivin) and the Richie Rich solo debut album (Don't Do It). The song "Making Records" first appeared on the EP Geeks Revenge (Rodney), released in 1990.

== Track listing ==
1. "Don't Do It" – 4:06
2. "Rodney the Geek" – 4:29
3. "Female F.E.D." – 4:05
4. "The Mic Is Mine" – 4:27
5. "Tic Tac" (featuring D-Loc) – 0:59
6. "Media Hype" (featuring D-Loc) – 4:15
7. "Together" – 3:33
8. "Snitches & Bitches" – 4:43
9. "Lifestyle as a Gangsta" (featuring D-Loc) – 3:36
10. "415" – 5:44
11. "Five MC's" (featuring D-Loc) – 3:53
12. "Side Show" (featuring D-Loc) – 3:51
13. "Ruthless Is Reality" (featuring D-Loc, Brotha Broski & Icee B) – 5:46
14. "Making Records" – 4:05
