= Big League Records Greatest Hits =

Greatest hits album by 415
- Released: April 6, 1999
- Genre: West Coast hip hop, gangsta rap, hip hop, rap
- Length: 53:34
- Label: Big League Records, Inc.
- Producer: DJ Daryl, J.E.D., Kirk Crumpler, Darrin "Digital-D" Harris

415 chronology
Nu Niggaz on Tha Blokkk (1991)	Big League Records Greatest Hits (1999)

Richie Rich chronology
Seasoned Veteran (1996)	Big League Records Greatest Hits (1999)	Greatest Hits (2000)

Professional ratings
Review scores
Source	Rating
Allmusic	link

J.E.D. Productions Presents Big League Records Greatest Hits is a compilation of previously released material from American rap group 415 and its main performers Richie Rich and D-Loc. The tracks are compiled from 415's only two releases (41Fivin and Nu Niggaz on Tha Blokkk), as well as the solo debut albums from Richie Rich (Don't Do It) and D-Loc (Split Personality).

== Track listing ==
#	Title	Performers	Producer
1	"Don't Do It"	Richie Rich	
2	"Snitches & Bitches"	Richie Rich, J.E.D.	DJ Daryl
3	"415"	Richie Rich	DJ Daryl
4	"Groupie Ass Bitch"	Richie Rich, D-Loc, J.E.D.	Darrin "Digital-D" Harris
5	"Niggas Just Jock Me"	D-Loc	DJ Daryl
6	"Regina the Teaser"	D-Loc	
7	"Lifestyle as a Gangsta"	D-Loc	
8	"41Fivin"	Richie Rich, D-Loc	DJ Daryl
9	"Court In The Street"	Richie Rich, D-Loc	Darrin "Digital-D" Harris
10	"Call It What You Want 2"	Richie Rich, D-Loc	DJ Daryl
11	"Get Loc'd Out"	D-Loc	
12	"Side Show"	Richie Rich, D-Loc	Darrin "Digital-D" Harris
