= Touch Myself =

Single by T-Boz

from the album Fled
- Released: July 18, 1996
- Recorded: 1996
- Studio: DARP Studios (Atlanta, Georgia)
- Genre: R&B; hip hop soul
- Length: 3:58
- Label: Rowdy; LaFace; Arista
- Songwriter: Dallas Austin
- Producer: Austin

T-Boz singles chronology
"Touch Myself" (1996)	"Ghetto Love" (1997)

"Touch Myself" is the debut solo single by American singer Tionne "T-Boz" Watkins for the soundtrack album to the film Fled, starring Laurence Fishburne and Stephen Baldwin. It was released by Rowdy Records as the album's lead single on July 18, 1996. The accompanying music video was directed by Bille Woodruff, and was made both with and without clips from the film. It peaked at number 40, giving Watkins her first solo top-40 hit.

A remix was also made featuring rapper Richie Rich, and produced by Jermaine Dupri. The remix also had a music video which did not contain clips from the movie. In 1997, it was released as the third single from Richie Rich's 1996 album Seasoned Veteran.

== Critical reception ==
Larry Flick from Billboard magazine described the song as a "chugging jeep mover". He added, "With each recording, she sheds a little more of her girlish posture, revealing an assured funk stylist who makes the most of her limited (but hugely appealing) voice. It does not hurt that she has producer Dallas Austin in her corner. He has surrounded her with a sleek rhythm base and jazzy keyboards, not to mention a playfully sexy tune that must have been a blast to record."

Damien Mendis from Music Week's RM Dance Update gave the song a full score of five out of five, noting that the lead singer from TLC "takes a controversial dip into hot waters with a cool slice of mid-tempo R&B." He felt that written and produced by Austin, "this sounds like a logical follow-up to their killer 'Creep' hit as it bears strong similarities. A lazy jazz guitar replaces the trumpet and the bass guitar twangs a Craig Mack 'Flava' riff over a slinky rhythm lifted from ATCQ's 'Bonita Applebum'. It is instantly familiar as the break the Fugees recently utilised on 'Softly'. The steamy but catchy lyrics will no doubt win her more fans and, hopefully, UK radio won't prove as prudish as the US. (..) Can't wait. I smell a hit."

== Charts ==
Chart (1996)	Peak position
Scotland Singles (OCC)	92
UK Singles (OCC)	48
UK Dance (OCC)	8
UK Hip Hop/R&B (OCC)	6
US Billboard Hot 100	40
US Hot Dance Music (Billboard)	3
US R&B/Hip-Hop (Billboard)	23

== Credits and personnel ==
Credits adapted from the CD single.

Recording and management

- Recorded and mixed at DARP Studios (Atlanta, GA)
- Mastered at The Hit Factory (New York City, New York)
- Contains a sample of "Hey Young World", written by Ricky Walters and performed by Slick Rick, published by Def American Songs, Inc., courtesy of Def Jam Recordings, Inc.
- Contains a sample from "Who the Cap Fits", written by Edmund Carl Aiken, Jr. PKA Shinehead, and performed by Shinehead, published by African Love Music/Def American Songs, Inc. under license from African Love Music
- Managed by Hiriam Management
- Published by EMI April Music Inc., Darp Music (ASCAP)

Personnel

- Dallas Austin – writing, production, instrumentation, executive production
- Atvi Speights – recording engineer, mixing
- Leslie Brathwaite – recording engineering
- Carl Glover – recording assistant
- Brian Smith – recording assistant
- Sol Messiah – scratching
- Rick Sheppard – MIDI and sound designing
- Debra Killings – background vocals
- Chris Gehringer – mastering
- Antonio M. Reid – executive production
- Kenneth Edmonds – executive production
- Perri Reid – executive production
- Dah Len – photography
- Davett Singletary – creative direction
- Christopher Stern – art direction
