= Give It 2 You =

Single by Da Brat

from the album Funkdafied
- Released: October 17, 1994 (single); May 9, 1995 (radio)
- Recorded: 1994
- Genre: G-funk
- Length: 3:13
- Label: So So Def Recordings
- Songwriters: Jermaine Dupri, Shawntae Harris
- Producer: Jermaine Dupri

Da Brat singles chronology
"Fa All Y'all" (1994)	"Give It 2 You" (1994)	"No One Else" (1995)

"Give It 2 You" is the third and final single released from American rapper Da Brat's debut album, Funkdafied (1994), the first album from a female rapper to go platinum.

== Background ==
Produced by Jermaine Dupri and Manuel Seal, Jr., who used a sample of the Mary Jane Girls' "All Night Long", "Give It 2 You" was the final single from Da Brat's platinum-certified album Funkdafied after "Funkdafied" (#6 US) and "Fa All Y'all" (#37 US). It was released in October 1994 and became her third consecutive top 40 hit, peaking at No. 26 on the Billboard Hot 100, and her second to earn a RIAA certification, reaching gold status on June 14, 1996 for sales of 500,000 copies.

== Music video ==
The music video was directed by Michael Merriman premiered on BET, MTV & VH1 in 1995. The song's music video featured appearances from Jermaine Dupri, Kris Kross, MC Lyte, Da Bush Babees, The Notorious B.I.G., Sean "Puffy" Combs, Mary J. Blige, Keith Murray, Goodie Mob, Too Short, T-Boz and Bill Bellamy, among others. The video also featured audio samples of "Smooth Criminal" by Michael Jackson, and Da Brat's song "Da B Side", which featured The Notorious B.I.G. and Jermaine Dupri.

== Single track listing ==
=== A-Side ===
1. "Give It 2 You" (Extended Radio Edit)- 3:51
2. "Give It 2 You" (EP Version)- 3:09
3. "Give It 2 You" (Remix Instrumental)- 3:53

=== B-Side ===
1. "Give It 2 You" (LP Version)- 3:12
2. "Give It 2 You" (Dirty Remix Version)- 3:53
3. "Give It 2 You" (LP Instrumental)- 3:12

== Charts ==
=== Weekly charts ===
Chart (1995)	Peak position
US Billboard Hot 100	26
US Dance Singles Sales (Billboard)	4
US Hot R&B/Hip-Hop Songs (Billboard)	11
US Hot Rap Songs (Billboard)	3
US Rhythmic Airplay (Billboard)	22
US Cash Box Top 100	24

=== Year-end charts ===
Chart (1995)	Position
US Billboard Hot 100	97
US Hot R&B/Hip-Hop Songs (Billboard)	56

== Certifications ==
Region	Certification	Certified units/sales
United States (RIAA)	Gold	500,000^{^}
^{^} Shipments figures based on certification alone.
