= In Love wit Chu =

Single by Da Brat featuring Cherish

from the album Limelite, Luv & Niteclubz
- Released: June 8, 2003
- Recorded: 2002
- Genre: Hip hop; R&B
- Length: 4:08
- Label: So So Def; Arista
- Songwriter(s): L.T. Hutton; Shawntae Harris
- Producer(s): L.T. Hutton

Da Brat singles chronology
"What'chu Like" (2000)	"In Love wit Chu" (2003)	"Miss P." (2003)

Cherish singles chronology
"In Love wit Chu" (2003)	"Miss P." (2003)

Music video
- "In Love Wit Chu" on YouTube

"In Love wit Chu" is the lead single from Da Brat's fourth studio album, Limelite, Luv & Niteclubz. The song featured R&B group Cherish, in what was the group's first official appearance. The single peaked at n°9 on the Billboard rhythmic.

== Background ==
Released on June 8, 2003, "In Love wit Chu" was the first and only single from Limelite, Luv & Niteclubz and was produced and co-written by L. T. Hutton, becoming Da Brat's first single to not be produced or written by Jermaine Dupri. The song eventually peaked at No. 44 on the Billboard Hot 100 during the summer of 2003, narrowly missing becoming her seventh top 40 single. It also peaked at n°9 on the Billboard rhythmic. The song featured the debuting Cherish, who made their first appearance on this song, later in the year Da Brat returned the favor by appearing on Cherish's "Miss P.", which was their solo debut.

== Music video ==
The music video features cameo appearances by Mariah Carey, boxer Roy Jones Jr., and Jermaine Dupri.

== Single track listing ==
1. "In Love wit Chu" (Radio Edit)- 4:13
2. "World Premiere" (Radio Mix)- 3:18
3. "In Love wit Chu"- 4:08

== Charts ==
Chart (2003)	Peak position
Canada (Nielsen SoundScan)	29
Belgium (Ultratip Bubbling Under Flanders)	11
Netherlands (Single Top 100)	99
New Zealand (Recorded Music NZ)	11
US Billboard Hot 100	44
US Hot R&B/Hip-Hop Songs (Billboard)	32
US Hot Rap Songs (Billboard)	12
US Pop Airplay (Billboard)	32
US Rhythmic (Billboard)	9
