= Fled (soundtrack) =

Soundtrack album to Fled by various artists
- Released: July 15, 1996
- Recorded: 1995–1996
- Studio: DARP Studios (Atlanta, GA); Riversound (Lithonia, GA); Doppler Studios (Atlanta, GA); 360 Studios, Inc. (Atlanta, GA); Onyx Studios (West Hollywood, CA); Digital Edge Studios (Atlanta, GA)
- Genre: Hip hop; R&B
- Length: 52:41
- Label: Rowdy; Arista
- Producer: Colin Wolfe; Dallas Austin; Fishbone; Lou; Mr. Collipark; Organized Noize; Rick Sheppard; Ron Spearman; Tony Rich; T. Smith

Singles from Fled
- 1. "Touch Myself" Released: July 18, 1996

Professional ratings
Review scores
| Source | Rating |
|---|---|
| AllMusic | 2/5 stars |

Fled is the original soundtrack album to Kevin Hooks's 1996 buddy action comedy film Fled. It was released on July 15, 1996, through Rowdy/Arista Records and consists mainly of R&B and hip hop music. Recording sessions took place at DARP Studios, Doppler Studios, 360 Studios, Inc. and Digital Edge Studios in Atlanta, Riversound in Lithonia, and Onyx Studios in West Hollywood. Production was handled by Colin Wolfe, Fishbone, Lou, Mr. Collipark, Organized Noize, Rick Sheppard, Ron Spearman, Tony Rich, T. Smith, and Dallas Austin, who also served as executive producer. It features contributions from Big Rube, DJ Kizzy Rock, Fishbone, For Real, God's Gift to God, Goodie Mob, Joi, Lou, Monica, Royal C, T-Boz, Tony Rich and T. Smith. The album peaked at number 60 on the Billboard Top R&B/Hip-Hop Albums chart. Its single "Touch Myself" made it to No. 40 on the Billboard Hot 100 and No. 23 on the Hot R&B/Hip-Hop Songs.

== Track listing ==
| No. | Title | Writer(s) | Producer(s) | Length |
|---|---|---|---|---|
| 1. | "Intro" (performed by Big Rube) | Ruben Bailey | Dallas Austin | 1:40 |
| 2. | "You Can't Run" (performed by Royal C) | Charles Hood; Colin Wolfe | Colin Wolfe | 4:32 |
| 3. | "Touch Myself" (performed by T-Boz) | Dallas Austin; Hurby Azor | Dallas Austin | 4:09 |
| 4. | "Remember What I Said" (performed by Goodie Mob) | Robert Barnett; Cameron Gipp; Thomas Callaway; Willie Knighton; Organized Noize | Organized Noize | 5:13 |
| 5. | "Bright Lights" (performed by T. Smith) | T. Smith; Bill Buchanan; N. Constantine | T. Smith | 2:58 |
| 6. | "Word" (performed by God's Gift To God) | Michael Marasse; B. Kennedy | Rick Sheppard | 3:18 |
| 7. | "Missing You" (performed by Monica) | Austin; Lonnie Liston Smith | Dallas Austin | 4:30 |
| 8. | "Highway" (performed by The Tony Rich Project) | Antonio Jeffries | Tony Rich | 5:12 |
| 9. | "Magic in Your Eyes" (performed by Joi) | Yvette Marie Stevens; Tony Maiden | Colin Wolfe; Dallas Austin (co.) | 3:54 |
| 10. | "Spain" (performed by Lou) | Austin; Debra Killings | Dallas Austin; Lou | 4:39 |
| 11. | "Right Way" (performed by For Real) | Josina Elder; Latanyia Baldwin; Necia Bray; Wendi Williams; Ron Spearman | Ron Spearman | 3:48 |
| 12. | "Crank This" (performed by DJ Kizzy Rock) | Carlos Young; Michael Crooms; Arthur Baker; John Robie | DJ Smurf | 4:19 |
| 13. | "Fled" (performed by Fishbone) | Angelo Moore; John Bigham; John Norwood Fisher; Phillip Fisher; Walter Kibby; Austin | Dallas Austin; Fishbone | 4:29 |
| Total length: | | | | 52:41 |

== Charts ==
| Chart (1996) | Peak position |
|---|---|
| US Top R&B Albums (Billboard) | 60 |
