= The Game (Richie Rich album) =

Studio album by Richie Rich
- Released: September 12, 2000
- Recorded: 1996–1999
- Genres: West Coast hip hop, rap
- Length: 60:01
- Label: Ten-Six Records
- Producers: Bosko, Dent, DJ Daryl, DJ Miz, Wilson Hankins a.k.a.Flexx, Jazze Pha, Lev Berlak, Mike Dean, Richie Rich (exec.), Ruffa

Richie Rich chronology
Greatest Hits (2000)	The Game (2000)	Nixon Pryor Roundtree (2002)

Professional ratings
Review scores
Source	Rating
AllMusic	3/5 stars
RapReviews	6.5/10 stars

The Game is the fourth studio album by American rapper Richie Rich, released September 12, 2000, on Ten-Six Records. It peaked at number 53 on the Billboard Top R&B/Hip-Hop Albums and at number 10 on the Billboard Independent Albums. Two singles were released, "I Ain't Gonna Do" and "If...". No music videos were released to promote the album.

== Conception ==
Richie Rich left Def Jam and released this album on his own independent label, Ten-Six Records (created with Lev Berlak), yet most of the material was recorded while he was still on Def Jam.

== Track listing ==
1. "Straight Mail" (featuring B-Legit) – 4:11
2. "I Ain't Gonna Do" – 5:04
3. "Playboy" – 3:48
4. "Use Ta Sell" – 4:08
5. "If..." – 5:12
6. "The Truth" (featuring Gonzoe and Val Young) – 5:05
7. "Birds" – 3:43
8. "Game Don't Stop" (featuring Rhythm & Green) – 5:52
9. "Bringin' It Back" – 3:31
10. "Who's House" – 3:57
11. "How Many Licks" (featuring Yukmouth) – 4:53
12. "Her Pussy" – 4:01
13. "Hit Me on the Hip" (featuring Val Young and Rame Royal of Rhythm & Green) – 4:26
14. "The Game" – 3:22
15. "Nothin' to Lose" (featuring Ruffa) – 3:49
16. "Tyme 'N My Life" – 4:01

== Chart history ==
Chart (2001)	Peak position
U.S. Billboard Independent Albums	10
U.S. Billboard Top R&B/Hip-Hop Albums	53
