= Rugrats in Paris: The Movie =

2000 animated film

- Theatrical release poster
- Directed by: Paul Demeyer; Stig Bergqvist
- Written by: J. David Stem; David N. Weiss; Jill Gorey; Barbara Herndon; Kate Boutilier
- Based on: Rugrats by Arlene Klasky; Gábor Csupó; Paul Germain
- Produced by: Arlene Klasky; Gábor Csupó
- Starring: E. G. Daily; Tara Strong; Cheryl Chase; Christine Cavanaugh; Kath Soucie; Michael Bell; Dionne Quan; Susan Sarandon; John Lithgow
- Edited by: John Bryant
- Music by: Mark Mothersbaugh
- Production companies: Nickelodeon Movies; Klasky Csupo
- Distributed by: Paramount Pictures (North America); United International Pictures (International)
- Release date: November 17, 2000
- Running time: 78 minutes
- Country: United States
- Language: English
- Budget: $30 million
- Box office: $103.3 million

Rugrats in Paris: The Movie (Note: (also known as Rugrats in Paris or The Rugrats Movie 2)) is a 2000 American animated comedy film based on the Nickelodeon animated television series Rugrats. Directed by Paul Demeyer and Stug Bergqvist, it is the second feature film based on the series following The Rugrats Movie (1998). The plot takes place after the series' sixth season and before the seventh season and centers on Chuckie Finster as he resolves to find a new mother during a joint family vacation in Paris.

Rugrats in Paris: The Movie was released in the United States on November 17, 2000, by Paramount Pictures. It received generally positive reviews from critics and grossed $103 million against a budget of $30 million. This was the final Rugrats film to feature Christine Cavanaugh as the voice of Chuckie, who retired from acting in 2001. A sequel and crossover with The Wild Thornberrys, Rugrats Go Wild, was released in 2003.

== Plot ==
Six months following Dil Pickles' birth (Note: As depicted in The Rugrats Movie (1998).), at the wedding reception of Lou Pickles and his new wife Lulu, a mother-child dance saddens Chuckie Finster with memories of his mother, who died shortly after his birth. Realizing that he and his son miss that female influence in their lives, Chuckie's father Chas considers remarrying. Tommy Pickles' father Stu is then summoned to EuroReptarland, a Japanese amusement park in Paris, to fix a malfunctioning Reptar robot he designed for the park's stage show.

The Pickles, Finster and DeVille families travel to EuroReptarland, run by the ill-tempered and child-hating Coco LaBouche, who desires to succeed her supervisor, Mr. Yamaguchi, as president of the Reptar corporation. Angelica Pickles overhears Coco falsely informing Yamaguchi, who insists his successor must love children, that she is engaged to a man with a child. Yamaguchi says he will consider her promotion once he has attended her wedding. Angelica is then discovered eavesdropping and saves herself by telling Coco about Chas.

Coco begins pursuing Chas with the help of her put-upon but kindhearted assistant, Kira Watanabe, who tells the babies how Reptar was a feared monster before his gentler side was revealed by a princess. Hearing this, Chuckie decides he wants the princess to be his mother. Meanwhile, the Pickles' dog Spike wanders the Parisian streets and falls in love with a stray poodle named Fifi.

While Coco wins over Chas, Chuckie remains deeply distrustful of her. At the Reptar show's premiere, Angelica informs Coco of Chuckie's wish to have the princess for his mother, prompting Coco to infiltrate the show disguised as the princess. She lures Chuckie on stage, where he is horrified upon discovering her true identity; however, seeing his son go to Coco convinces Chas that he should marry her immediately.

On her wedding day, Coco orders her accomplice, Jean-Claude, to keep the babies and Angelica from intervening. Kira learns of Coco's plot and threatens to tell Chas but gets thrown out en route to the ceremony at Notre Dame and hurries there via bicycle. Meanwhile, Jean-Claude imprisons the babies in a warehouse where EuroReptarland's robots are kept. When Chuckie despairs over the situation, a guilt-ridden Angelica reveals Coco's plot and her role in it. Following the revelation, Chuckie rallies the others to stop the wedding and they hurry there in the Reptar robot, while picking up Kira's daughter, Kimi, along the way. Jean-Claude pursues them in the animatronic of Reptar's nemesis, Robosnail; the duo eventually fight and the babies use Reptar to knock him into the Seine River.

The babies arrive at the cathedral and stop the wedding in the nick of time. Once Coco's plot and true nature are exposed, a disgusted Chas calls off the wedding, while Yamaguchi dismisses her on the spot. When Coco makes some of the babies fall to the floor as she attempts to leave, Angelica retaliates by stepping on and ripping her dress. A humiliated Coco flees the cathedral, while Spike chases Jean-Claude away.

As Chas apologizes to Chuckie for everything Coco put them both through, Kira arrives and apologizes to him for not speaking up sooner. Realizing they have much in common, Chas and Kira develop feelings for each other. Returning home, they marry and the Finsters and Watanabes, who additionally adopt Fifi, become a new family.

== Voice cast ==
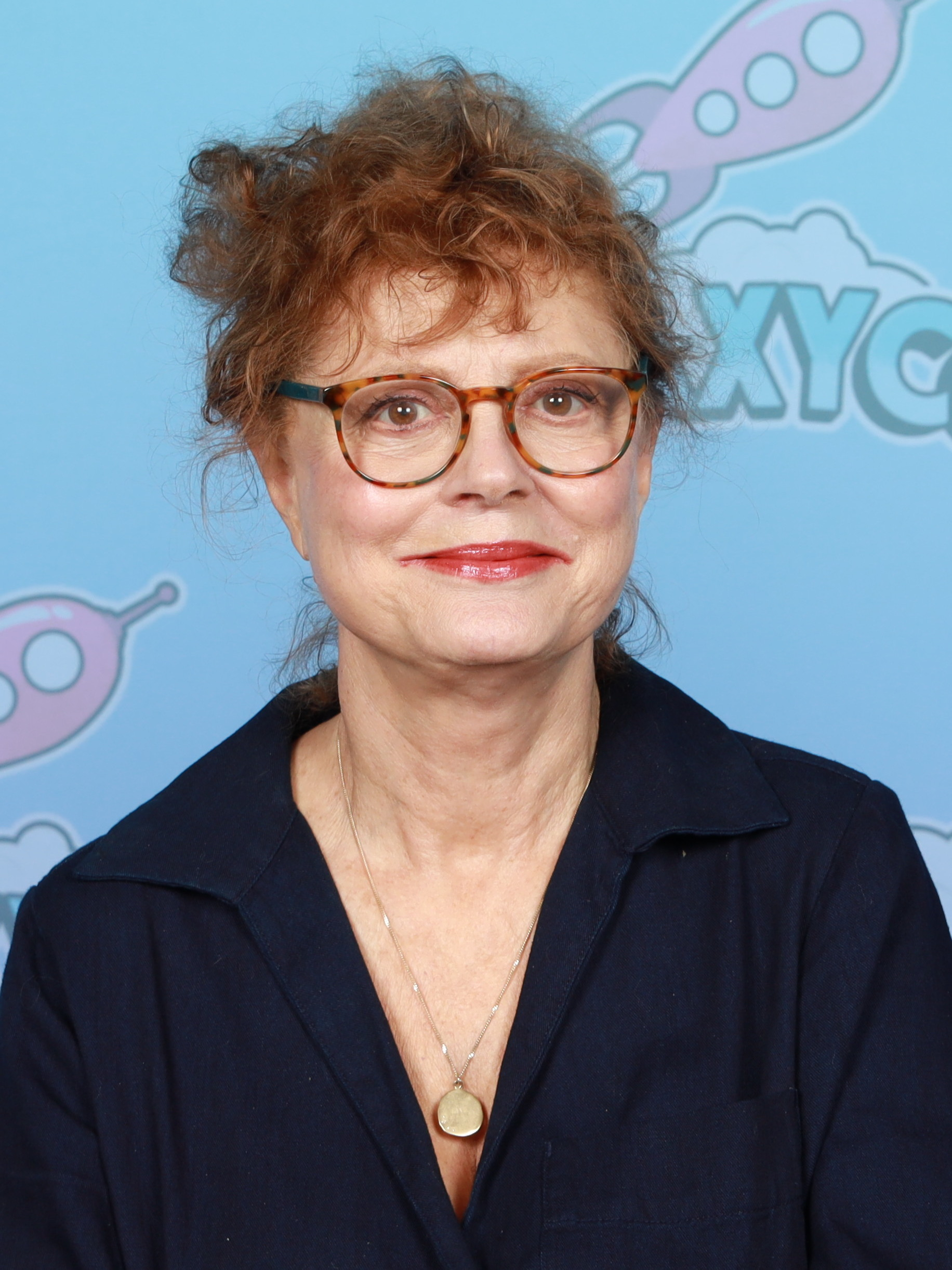
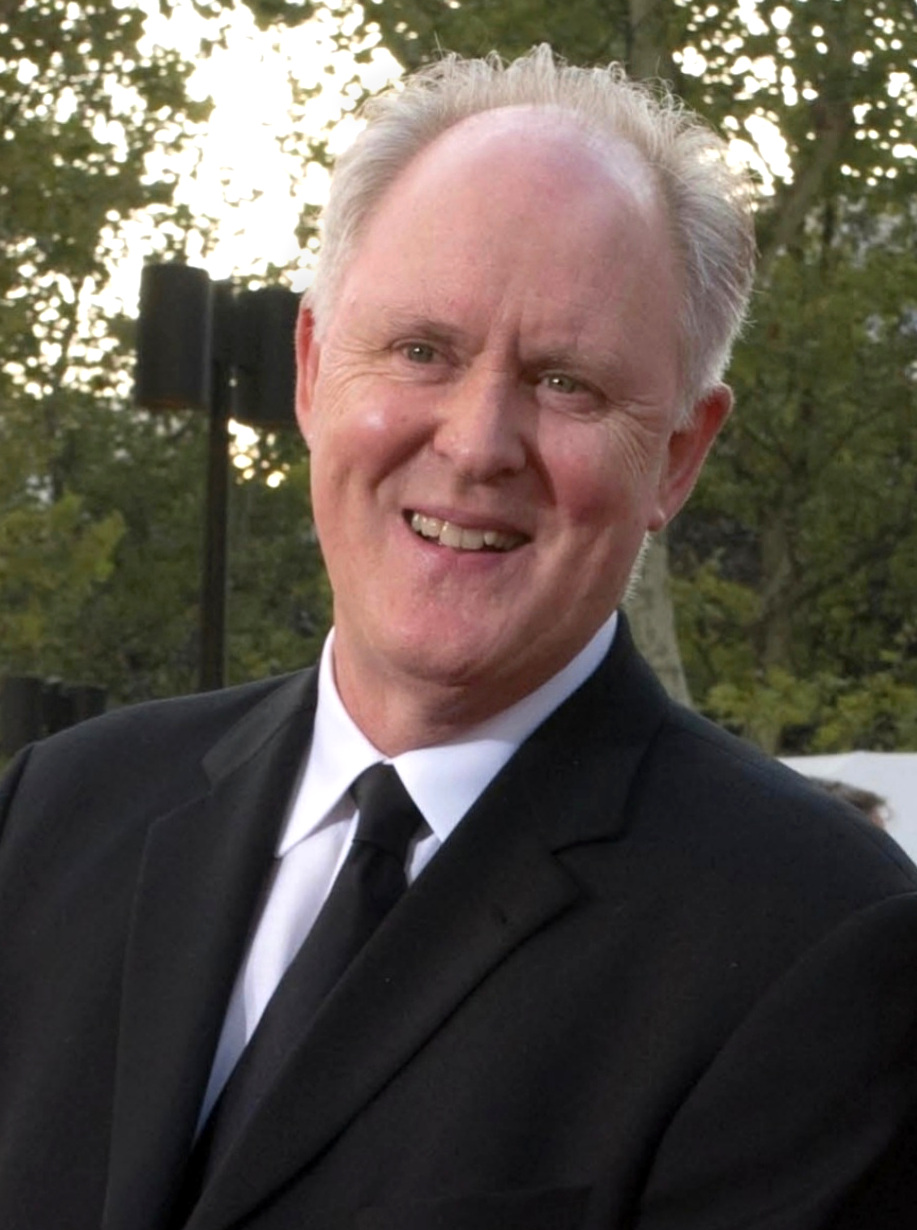
Susan Sarandon (left) and John Lithgow (right) provide the voices of Coco LaBouche and Jean-Claude, respectively.

=== Main ===
- Christine Cavanaugh as Chuckie Finster
- E. G. Daily as Tommy Pickles
- Cheryl Chase as Angelica Pickles
- Kath Soucie as Phil DeVille, Lil DeVille and Betty DeVille
- Tara Strong as Dil Pickles
- Dionne Quan as Kimi Watanabe
- Jack Riley as Stu Pickles
- Melanie Chartoff as Didi Pickles
- Michael Bell as Chas Finster and Drew Pickles
- Julia Kato as Kira Watanabe
- Tress MacNeille as Charlotte Pickles
- Philip Proctor as Howard DeVille
- Susan Sarandon as Coco LaBouche
- John Lithgow as Jean-Claude

=== Minor ===
- Joe Alaskey as Lou Pickles
- Debbie Reynolds as Lulu Pickles
- Cree Summer as Susie Carmichael
- Mako Iwamatsu as Mr. Yamaguchi
- Marlene Mituko, Darrel Kunitomi and Goh Misawa as extras in EuroReptarland's "Princess Spectacular" show
- Tim Curry, Kevin Michael Richardson and Billy West as sumo wrestler-portraying karaoke performers
- Paul DeMeyer as a street sweeper and a dog catcher
- Phillip Simon as an animatronic bus driver
- Richard Michel as an employee at EuroReptarland
- Charlie Adler as a police officer
- Phillipe Benichou as a member of EuroReptarland's ninja-portraying security team
- Dan Castellaneta as Notre-Dame's archbishop
- Lisa McClowry as Reptar's princess companion
- Casey Kasem as the disc jockey at Lou and Lulu's wedding
- Roger Rose as the disc jockey at Chas and Kira's wedding
- Margaret Smith as an airplane stewardess

== Soundtrack ==
Rugrats in Paris: The Movie: Music from the Motion Picture

Soundtrack album by Various Artists
- Released: November 7, 2000
- Recorded: 1999–2000
- Genres: R&B; hip hop; pop
- Length: 50:55
- Labels: Nickelodeon; Maverick

Singles from Rugrats in Paris: The Movie: Music From the Motion Picture
- 1. "Who Let the Dogs Out?" Released: July 25, 2000; 2. "My Getaway" Released: November 5, 2000; 3. "L'Histoire d'une fée, c'est..." Released: February 27, 2001

Soundtrack
Review scores
Source	Rating
Allmusic	3/5 stars

A soundtrack album for the film, titled Rugrats in Paris: The Movie: Music from the Motion Picture, was released on November 7, 2000, on Maverick Records and features new music from Jessica Simpson, Baha Men, Tionne "T-Boz" Watkins of TLC, Amanda and Aaron Carter. Like the last soundtrack, it also contains an enhanced part: the theme song to the film "Jazzy Rugrat Love" by Teena Marie.

No.	Title	Artist(s)	Length
1.	"My Getaway"	T-Boz (of TLC)	3:50
2.	"You Don't Stand a Chance"	Amanda	3:44
3.	"Life is a Party"	Aaron Carter	3:26
4.	"Who Let the Dogs Out?"	Baha Men	3:18
5.	"Final Heartbreak"	Jessica Simpson	3:42
6.	"When You Love"	Sinéad O'Connor	5:18
7.	"I'm Telling You This"	No Authority	4:08
8.	"These Boots Are Made for Walkin'"	Geri Halliwell (from Spice Girls)	3:03
9.	"Chuckie Chan (Martial Arts Expert of Reptarland)"	Isaac Hayes & Alex Brown	4:19
10.	"L'Histoire d'une fée, c'est..."	Mylène Farmer	5:12
11.	"I Want a Mom That Will Last Forever"	Cyndi Lauper	3:47
12.	"Excuse My French"	2Be3	3:03
13.	"Bad Girls"	Cheryl Chase with Tim Curry, Kevin Michael Richardson and Billy West	4:05

Bonus enhanced track on enhanced CD
No.	Title	Artist(s)	Length
14.	"Jazzy Rugrat Love" (Theme from Rugrats in Paris)	Teena Marie	5:07
Total length:			50:55

== Release ==
The film was released on November 17, 2000, by Paramount Pictures and Nickelodeon Movies. In select theaters, the film was accompanied by the short film Edwurd Fudwupper Fibbed Big.

=== Home media ===
Rugrats in Paris: The Movie was released on VHS and DVD on March 27, 2001, by Paramount Home Entertainment.

In 2009, Paramount released the film via iTunes and the PlayStation Store.

On March 15, 2011 (along with The Rugrats Movie and Rugrats Go Wild), the film was re-released in a three-disc movie trilogy collection DVD set in honor of the original show's 20th anniversary.

On August 29, 2017, Rugrats in Paris was re-released on DVD.

On March 8, 2022 (along with The Rugrats Movie and Rugrats Go Wild), the film was released on Blu-ray as part of the trilogy movie collection.

== Reception ==
=== Critical reception ===
On Rotten Tomatoes, the film holds an approval rating of 76% based on 75 reviews and an average rating of 6.3/10. The site's critical consensus read: "When the Rugrats go to Paris, the result is Nickelodeon-style fun. The plot is effectively character-driven, and features catchy songs and great celebrity voice-acting." Metacritic gave a film a weighted average score of 62 out of 100 based on 25 critics, indicating "generally favorable reviews". Audiences polled by CinemaScore gave the film an average grade of "A−" on an A+ to F scale.

Roger Ebert gave the film three out of four stars, stating, "The point is, adults can attend this movie with a fair degree of pleasure. That's not always the case with movies for kids, as no parent needs to be reminded. There may even be some moms who insist that the kids need to see this movie. You know who you are." Common Sense Media gave the film a three out of five stars, stating, "Eighty minutes of visual surprises, clever comedy." Empire gave the film a three out of five stars, stating, "Just as good as the last outing, this is great kiddie fare with some filmic references for the adults."

Jesse Florea of the fundamentalist activist organization Focus on the Family's entertainment review outlet Plugged In wrote, "If parents are wanting more of what they see on the Rugrats TV show (plenty of potty humor, disrespectful language and zero discipline), then this movie lives up to expectations. Never is a child scolded for making a mess or reprimanded for being rude (of course, some of this is due to the fact that many of the characters aren’t old enough to talk and only communicate with each other). The movie is cleverly written—it actually has the ability to hold adults’ attention for longer than three minutes—but it's not funny that chaos is the norm and children get to do whatever they want whenever they want. Neither is it appropriate for a children's film to tip its hat to such R-rated flicks as The Godfather and A Few Good Men."

=== Box office ===
The film grossed $76.5 million in North America and $26.8 million in other territories for a worldwide total of $103.3 million, against a $30 million budget.

In the United States, it opened at No. 2 behind How the Grinch Stole Christmas, grossing $22.7 million in its opening weekend for an average of $7,743 from 2,934 venues. In the United Kingdom, it opened at No. 1 spot before it was dropped at No. 3 by its second weekend, behind Bridget Jones's Diary and Spy Kids.

== Crossover sequel ==
A sequel, titled Rugrats Go Wild, that is a crossover with the characters from The Wild Thornberrys (another franchise from Klasky Csupo), was released on June 13, 2003.
