= Lisa McClowry =

American singer-songwriter

- Origin: Chicago, Illinois area
- Genres: Pop, rock, jazz
- Occupations: Singer, songwriter
- Label: World Stage International Records\Big Deal Records
- Website: LisaMcClowry.com

Lisa McClowry is an American singer-songwriter from Chicago, Illinois. She cites her musical influences as Ella Fitzgerald, Ann Wilson (Heart) and Steve Perry. Having performed on more than 25 albums, her singing style intertwines soul, jazz, rock and pop.

== Career ==
She co-wrote and performed "Through the Eyes of a Child" for the motion picture The Adventures of Rocky and Bullwinkle. She was also the singing voice of the "Princess" in Rugrats in Paris: The Movie. Later, she served as the singing voice and voice-over artist for TRESemmé shampoos and conditioners television campaign ("TRESemmé, Ooh la la TRESemmé!") and Applebee's. In 2010, McClowry was asked to co-star in a narrative short film that features a four-minute dance sequence/music video at Joseph's Café in Hollywood in a segment entitled "Vampire’s Dance" for the new Twisted Tales series by Tom Holland.

McClowry frequently works with Jim Peterik. On June 22, 2010, McClowry released a solo album entitled Time Signatures under the World Stage International Records\Big Deal Records labels (distributed by Sony/Red). All of the songs were either written by Peterik or co-written with Peterik.

She currently resides with her husband Perry Krokidas.
