= Miss P. (song) =

Single by Cherish featuring Da Brat

from the album The Moment
- Released: (United Kingdom) June 3, 2003 (United States) July 8, 2003
- Genre: Hip hop; R&B
- Length: 4:04
- Label: Warner Bros.
- Songwriter: Kandi Burruss
- Producer: Jermaine Dupri

Cherish singles chronology
"In Love wit Chu" (2003)	"Miss P." (2003)	"Do It to It" (2006)

Da Brat singles chronology
"In Love wit Chu" (2003)	"Miss P." (2003)	"Is It Chu?" (2013)

"Miss P." (an abbreviation for "Miss Pimp") is a song by Cherish, released as their debut single as a lead artist soon after they made their musical debut alongside Da Brat in her single, "In Luv Wit Chu". The song was written by Kandi Burruss and produced by Jermaine Dupri and released on June 3, 2003. Seen as their breakout into the music industry, the song had moderate success, but the album was soon shelved for undisclosed reasons. A music video was also released for the single, and the girls' performed the track on Soul Train in May 2003.

The single was later released on The Moment EP (album sampler).

== Music video ==
Released on September 5, 2003 under Warner Bros. Records, the video first shows Farrah, Neosha, Fallon and Felisha getting ready in their bedroom, then sitting on the bed and singing. Then it shows the sisters walking around the city, hanging out, dancing at the neighborhood block party and later singing with Da Brat.

== Track listing ==
US Single

1. "Miss P." (featuring Da Brat) & Jermaine Dupri - 4:04
2. "Miss P." (No Rap Version) - 2:50

UK iTunes Single

1. "Miss P." (featuring Da Brat) & Jermaine Dupri - 4:04
2. "Miss P." (No Rap Version) - 2:50

== Charts ==
Chart (2003)	Peak position
US Hot R&B/Hip-Hop Songs (Billboard)	87
US Rhythmic Airplay (Billboard)	26
