= My Getaway =

2000 single by Tionne Watkins

Single by Tionne "T-Boz" Watkins

from the album Rugrats in Paris: The Movie: Music From the Motion Picture
- Released: October 3, 2000
- Studio: Record Plant (Los Angeles, California)
- Length: 3:51
- Label: Maverick
- Songwriters: Tionne "T-Boz" Watkins, Brycyn "Juvie" Evans
- Producer: Soulshock and Karlin

Tionne "T-Boz" Watkins singles chronology
"Ghetto Love" (1997)	"My Getaway" (2000)	"Let's Just Do It" (2009)

"My Getaway" is a song by Tionne "T-Boz" Watkins and Brycyn "Juvie" Evans from the Rugrats in Paris Movie Soundtrack. Watkins said of her involvement, "I'm a big fan of Tommy and Chuckie and the rest of the Rugrats, and I'm honored to be on this soundtrack". The song is played in the scene where Angelica is listening to her personal stereo during the flight to Paris on the plane, and in the end credits of Rugrats in Paris: The Movie with "Who Let the Dogs Out?" and "When You Love".

Release as a single to rhythmic contemporary radio on October 3, 2000, the song peaked at number 79 on the US Billboard Hot R&B/Hip-Hop Singles & Tracks chart. In the United Kingdom, "My Getaway" peaked at number 44 on the UK Singles Chart. The song was also available as a CD and vinyl single, being distributed to radio stations by the Maverick Recording Company. The artwork has T-Boz on the front and the Rugrats on the back.

== Music video ==
The official music video for the song was directed by Christopher Erskin. The video consists of T-Boz sitting in a Rugrats-like parade float led by her dancers wearing Chuckie costumes with balloon versions of the characters up above her while singing the song. Aside from taking clips from Rugrats in Paris, intercut scenes of T-Boz dancing with children wearing Rugrats attire are shown while being a giantess holding bubblegum ropes and lying down on a pavement. At one point, a balloon version of T-Boz appears in the sky and lands in a forest setting where she comes out of the balloon. The children then play in the forest while T-Boz dances with them as the video ends.

== Track listing ==
European CD single

1. "My Getaway" (album version) – 3:51
2. "My Getaway" (instrumental) – 3:51
3. "My Getaway" (acapella) – 3:49

== Charts ==
Weekly chart performance for "My Getaway"
Chart (2000–2001)	Peak position
Australia (ARIA)	86
Belgium (Ultratip Bubbling Under Flanders)	14
Belgium (Ultratip Bubbling Under Wallonia)	11
Germany (GfK)	98
UK Singles (OCC)	44
UK Hip Hop/R&B (OCC)	8
US Hot R&B/Hip-Hop Songs (Billboard)	79
US Rhythmic Airplay (Billboard)	31

== Release history ==
Release dates and formats for "My Getaway"
Region	Date	Format(s)	Label(s)	Ref.
United States	October 3, 2000	Rhythmic contemporary radio	Maverick	
Japan	December 13, 2000	CD	Maverick	
United Kingdom	April 2, 2001	CD; cassette	Maverick	
