= Totally T-Boz =

- Genre: Documentary
- Created by: D Renard Young
- Starring: Tionne "T-Boz" Watkins
- Country of origin: United States
- No. of seasons: 1
- No. of episodes: 4

Production
- Executive producers: D Renard Young; Darren Toon
- Running time: 40-43 minutes
- Production company: John Doe Media

Original release
- Network: TLC
- Release: January 1 – January 22, 2013

Totally T-Boz is an American reality documentary miniseries on TLC. The four-episode series premiered on January 1, 2013. Filmed in October 2012, Totally T-Boz follows Tionne "T-Boz" Watkins as she works on her new music career. As a member of TLC, the series also sheds light on Watkins working on 20th Anniversary plans with Rozonda "Chilli" Thomas and healing from the death of Lisa "Left Eye" Lopes. Watkins has stated via Twitter that she has no interest in continuing the series.

== Cast ==
- Tionne "T-Boz" Watkins
- Chase Anela Rolison
- Tae Tae
- Barbara Hall
- Tara Brivic
- Kayo Watkins
- Christopher "Cousin Chris" Hughes

== Episodes ==
No.	Title	Original release date	US viewers (millions)
1	"Starting Off New Again"	January 1, 2013	0.937
T-Boz has just arrived in the new city she calls home, Los Angeles, and she informs her TLC partner "Chilli" about her move. T-Boz reveals that Little Mix's song "Red Planet" was supposed to be for TLC but she sold it to them. This angered Chilli because she believed TLC needed songs for a new album and T-Boz wanted to help write songs for other artists.
2	"Back To My Roots!"	January 8, 2013	0.638
T-Boz goes back home to Atlanta with Chase to visit her father but upon arrival back home, T-Boz notices her health is going downhill.
3	"Unpretty"	January 15, 2013	0.501
T-Boz sits down for an intense interview with Perez Hilton, and endures her first professional photo shoot in years. In the end, T-Boz is the center of attention during a family discussion about her healthy lifestyle.
4	"The Final Countdown"	January 22, 2013	0.416
T-Boz and "Chilli" fix their friendship before T-Boz hosts her new single listening party. T-Boz later goes to the doctor to hear the results of her MRI.
