= Sittin' on Top of the World (Da Brat song) =

Single by Da Brat

from the album Anuthatantrum
- Released: September 24, 1996
- Recorded: 1996
- Genre: Hip hop, rap rock
- Length: 4:16
- Label: So So Def Recordings
- Songwriters: Jermaine Dupri, Shawntae Harris, Rick James
- Producer: Jermaine Dupri

Da Brat singles chronology
"No One Else (Puff Daddy Remix)" (1995)	"Sittin' on Top of the World" (1996)	"Ghetto Love" (1997)

Music video
- "Sittin' on Top of the World" on YouTube

"Sittin' on Top of the World" is the lead single from American rapper Da Brat's second studio album, Anuthatantrum (1996).

== Background ==
"Sittin' on Top of the World" was released in September 1996 and was produced and written by Jermaine Dupri, who used a sample of "Mary Jane". The song became her fourth consecutive top 40 hit in the United States, peaking at No. 30 on the Billboard Hot 100. About two months after its release, "Sittin' on Top of the World" reached gold status for sales of 500,000 copies on November 20, her third single to do so.

== Music video ==
The music video was directed by Richard Murray and premiered on BET, MTV & VH1 in 1996.

== Single track listing ==
1. "Sittin' on Top of the World" (Radio Edit)- 3:58
2. "Sittin' on Top of the World" (LP Version)- 4:17
3. "Sittin' on Top of the World" (Instrumental)- 4:17
4. "Sittin' on Top of the World" (Extended Radio Edit)- 5:09
5. "Sittin' on Top of the World" (Extended LP Version)- 5:09

== Charts ==
Chart (1996)	Peak position
New Zealand (Recorded Music NZ)	21
US Billboard Hot 100	30
US Dance Singles Sales (Billboard)	7
US Hot R&B/Hip-Hop Songs (Billboard)	18
US Hot Rap Songs (Billboard)	2
US Cash Box Top 100	27

== Certifications ==
Region	Certification	Certified units/sales
United States (RIAA)	Gold	500,000^{^}
^{^} Shipments figures based on certification alone.
