= Half Thang =

Studio album by Richie Rich
- Released: January 31, 1996
- Recorded: 1995
- Genre: Hip-hop
- Length: 39:02
- Label: Shot
- Producer: Lev Berlak; DJ Daryl; Kev T.; L.I.P.

Richie Rich chronology
Don't Do It (1990)	Half Thang (1996)	Seasoned Veteran (1996)

Half Thang is the second album by American rapper Richie Rich.

== Track listing ==
1. "Intro" – 0:32
2. "Ruff Neckin'" – 5:06
3. "Half Thang" – 3:55
4. "Busta Phree" – 4:29
5. "As Usual" (skit) – 0:45
6. "80 Ounces" – 3:05
7. "Fuck Dat Nigga" (skit) – 0:54
8. "Tastes Like Shit" – 4:37
9. "Cheap Thrill" – 4:32
10. "W. Dick" (skit; featuring Kev T.) – 0:34
11. "Dirde Luv" – 4:38
12. "Young Guns" (featuring T-Uni & Eclipz) – 5:13
13. "Triple Gold (Outro)" – 1:01

== Samples ==
"Ruff Neckin'"

- "Nuthin' but a "G" Thang" By Dr. Dre

"Half Thang"

- "Ain't No Future in Yo' Frontin" by MC Breed
- "Let Me Ride" by Dr. Dre

"Cheap Thrill"

- "Seven Minutes of Funk" by Tyrone Thomas & The Whole Darn Family
- "Pop Life" by Prince

"Triple Gold" (Skit)

- "Waterfalls" By TLC

== Chart history ==
Chart (1996)	Peak position
US Billboard Top R&B/Hip-Hop Albums	57
