= Ghetto Love (Da Brat song) =

1997 single by Da Brat

Single by Da Brat featuring T-Boz

from the album Anuthatantrum
- Released: March 1, 1997
- Recorded: 1996
- Genre: Hip hop, R&B
- Length: 3:24
- Label: So So Def Recordings
- Songwriters: Jermaine Dupri, Shawntae Harris, Eldra DeBarge
- Producer: Jermaine Dupri

Da Brat singles chronology
"Sittin' on Top of the World" (1996)	"Ghetto Love" (1997)	"Not Tonight (Remix)" (1997)

T-Boz singles chronology
"Touch Myself" (1996)	"Ghetto Love" (1997)	"My Getaway" (2000)

"Ghetto Love" is the second single released from Da Brat's second studio album, Anuthatantrum.

== Background ==
Released in early 1997, "Ghetto Love" was Da Brat's second and final single from Anuthatantrum after the gold-selling "Sittin' on Top of the World". The song became Da Brat's second biggest hit, peaking at No. 16 on the Billboard Hot 100. Only her first single, "Funkdafied", which peaked at 6, charted higher. Like the album's previous single, "Ghetto Love" was certified gold by the Recording Industry Association of America, reaching the feat on April 2, 1997. The song was produced by Jermaine Dupri and Carl So-Lowe, featured a chorus sung by the TLC member T-Boz and used a sample of DeBarge's 1983 hit "All This Love".

== Single track listing ==
1. "Ghetto Love" (Radio Remix)- 3:24
2. "Ghetto Love" (Remix) - 3:24
3. "Ghetto Love" (Remix Instrumental) - 3:24
4. "Ghetto Love" (Radio Edit) - 3:24
5. "Ghetto Love" (LP Version) - 3:24
6. "Ghetto Love" (LP Instrumental) - 3:24

== Charts ==
Chart (1997)	Peak position
US Billboard Hot 100	16
US Dance Singles Sales (Billboard)	17
US Hot R&B/Hip-Hop Songs (Billboard)	11
US Hot Rap Songs (Billboard)	4

== Certifications ==
Region	Certification	Certified units/sales
United States (RIAA)	Gold	500,000^{^}
^{^} Shipments figures based on certification alone.
