= Sickle Cell Disease Association of America =

Sickle Cell Disease Association of America, Inc.
- Formation: 1971
- Type: Nonprofit organization
- Purpose: Sickle-cell disease Research, public policy, education and community service.
- Headquarters: Baltimore, Maryland, U.S.
- Region served: United States
- President: Regina Hartfield
- Website: www.sicklecelldisease.org

The Sickle Cell Disease Association of America, Inc. (SCDAA) is a nonprofit organization with the sole purpose of supporting research, education and funding of individuals, families those who are impacted by sickle cell disease.

== Mission statement ==
"To advocate for and enhance our membership's ability to improve the quality of health, life and services for individuals, families and communities affected by sickle cell disease and related conditions, while promoting the search for a cure for all people in the world with sickle cell disease."

== History ==
The Sickle Cell Disease Association of America, Inc. originated in Racine, Wisconsin. Representatives from 15 different community-based sickle cell organizations came together at Wingspread, a community center, as guest of the Johnson Foundation. There was a common belief that there was a need for national attention to sickle cell disease. After a meeting, they created the "National Association for Sickle Cell Diseases". The name was changed in 1994 to the Sickle Cell Disease Association of America, Inc. Over the course of several years, the organization has grown into over 40 different branches. The organization has partnered with several different medical facilities, local and state government agencies to pursue national health care objectives. Some of the organization's partnerships include: National Association for the Advancement of Colored People (NAACP), National Institutes of Health (NIH), Health Resources and Services Administration (HRSA), Centers for Disease Control (CDC), United Way of America, and the Robert Johnson Foundation.

== Areas of emphasis ==
- Research
- Public Health Education
- Professional Health Education
- Patient Services
- Community Services
- Support to Global Organizations and Practitioners

== Events ==
The Sickle Cell Disease Association of America, Inc. hosts several events throughout each year. It hosts the Annual National Sickle Cell Walk with the Stars each summer. The inaugural walk was held on September 6, 2014, at Lake Montebello in Baltimore, Maryland. This event typically will have a variety vendors, kid activities, prizes and more. The Sickle Cell Disease Annual National Convention is held annually during October. The event will feature themed experience, with prizes, awards, auctions and educational sessions.

== Notable supporters ==
- Tionne 'T-Boz' Watkins - The National Celebrity Spokesperson for the SCDAA.
- Tiki Barber - The former NFL running back has sickle cell disease and does his part educating others.
- Prodigy - Hip Hop star promotes sickle cell awareness at different events, including the 2011 National Convention.
- Ryan Clark - NFL Super Bowl champion with the Pittsburgh Steelers.
- Devin McCourty and Ryan McCourty - Twins fight Sickle Cell Disease with Tackle Sickle Cell Organization.
- Kier "Junior" Spates - SCDAA National Celebrity Ambassador
- Larenz Tate - Actor is passionate about sickle cell awareness.
- Santonio Holmes - Runs benefit for son with sickle cell disease.

== Branches and affiliates ==
=== Alabama ===
- North Alabama Sickle Cell Foundation - Huntsville
- SCDAA - West Alabama Chapter - Northport
- SCDAA Central Foundation Central Alabama - Birmingham
- SCDAA - Mobile Chapter
- Sickle Cell Foundation of the River Region - Montgomery
- Southeast Alabama Sickle Cell Association, Inc. - Tuskegee

=== California ===
- Cayenne Wellness Center - Glendale

=== Colorado ===
- Colorado Sickle Cell Association - Denver

=== Connecticut ===
- Michelle's House / SCDAA Connecticut - Bridgeport/New Haven

=== Delaware ===
- Tova Community Health - Wilmington

=== Florida ===
- Levi Long Sickle Cell Association, Inc. - Daytona Beach
- Sickle Cell Association of Orange, Osceola, and Seminole Counties
- SCDAA of Escambia & Santa Rosa Counties - Pensacola
- SCDAA - Dade County Chapter, Inc. - Miami
- SCDAA - St. Petersburg Chapter
- Sickle Cell Association of Hillsborough County - Tampa
- Sickle Cell Disease Association of Broward County - Ft. Lauderdale
- Sickle Cell Disease Association of Florida - Tampa
- Sickle Cell Foundation of Palm Beach County & Treasure Coast Inc. - West Palm Beach
- Sickle Cell Foundation, Inc. - Tallahassee
- Sickle Cell Medical Advocacy, Inc. - Orlando

=== Georgia ===
- Sickle Cell Foundation of Georgia, Inc. - Atlanta

=== Illinois ===
- Sickle Cell Disease Association of Illinois - Chicago
- Sick Cells - Lisle

=== Indiana ===
- Martin Center, Inc. - Indianapolis

=== Kansas ===
- Uriel Owens Sickle Cell Disease Association of the Midwest - Kansas City

=== Louisiana ===
- Etta Pete Sickle Cell Anemia Foundation - Lake Charles
- Northeast Louisiana Sickle Cell Anemia Foundation - Monroe
- SCDAA - Northwest Louisiana - Shreveport
- Sickle Cell Anemia Resource Foundation - Alexandria
- Sickle Cell Association of South Louisiana - Baton Rouge

=== Maryland ===
- Association for the Prevention of Sickle Cell Anemia of Harford/Cecil Counties and Eastern Shore
- Maryland Sickle Cell Disease Association, Inc. (MSCDA)

=== Massachusetts ===
- Massachusetts Sickle Cell Association - Dorchester

=== Michigan ===
- SCDAA Michigan - Detroit

=== Minnesota ===
- Sickle Cell Foundation of Minnesota - Minneapolis

=== Missouri ===
- Sickle Cell Association of St. Louis - St. Louis

=== Nevada ===
- Bridging the Gap - Adult Sickle Cell Disease Foundation of Nevada - Las Vegas

=== New Jersey ===
- The Sickle Cell Association of New Jersey, Inc. - Newark

=== New Mexico ===
- The Sickle Cell Council of New Mexico - Albuquerque

=== New York ===
- Falling Angels Sickle Cell Foundation - Garnerville
- New York State Sickle Cell Advocacy Network, Inc. - Queens
- Sickle Cell Thalassemia Patients Network (SCTPN) - Brooklyn

=== North Carolina ===
- Bridges Pointe Sickle Cell Foundation - Durham
- Piedmont Health Services and Sickle Cell Agency - Greensboro

=== Ohio ===
- SCDAA - Ohio Sickle Cell & Health Association - Columbus

=== Oklahoma ===
- Supporters of Families With Sickle Cell Disease, Inc. - Tulsa

=== Oregon ===
- Sickle Cell Anemia Foundation of Oregon - Portland

=== Pennsylvania ===
- Children's Sickle Cell Foundation, Inc. - Pittsburgh
- SCDAA - Philadelphia/Delaware Valley Chapter
- The South Central PA Sickle Cell Council - Harrisburg

=== South Carolina ===
- James R. Clark Memorial Sickle Cell Foundation - Columbia

=== Tennessee ===
- Sickle Cell Foundation of Tennessee - Memphis

=== Texas ===
- Sickle Cell Association of Houston - Houston
- Sickle Cell Association of Texas Marc Thomas Foundation - Austin

=== Virginia ===
- Sickle Association, Inc. - Norfolk

=== Wisconsin ===
- Sickle Cell Warriors of Wisconsin
