= Let's Ride (Richie Rich song) =

Single by Richie Rich

from the album Seasoned Veteran
- Released: November 12, 1996
- Recorded: 1996
- Genre: West Coast hip hop, Gangsta rap, Hip hop, Rap
- Label: Def Jam
- Songwriter: Richie Rich
- Producer: Ali Malik

Richie Rich singles chronology
"Geeks Revenge (Rodney)" (1990)	"Let's Ride" (1996)	"Do G's Get to Go to Heaven?" (1997)

"Let's Ride" is the first single from American rapper Richie Rich's studio album Seasoned Veteran, released in 1996. The song peaked at #8 on the Billboard Hot Rap Singles chart, #67 on the Billboard Hot 100 chart, and #55 on the Hot R&B/Hip-Hop Singles & Tracks chart.

On July 25, 2021, the song was featured in Episode 6 of the television series Blindspotting.

== Music video ==
The official music video for the song was directed by Michael Lucero.

== Track listing ==
1. "Let's Ride"
2. "Let's Ride (Rated R Version)"
3. "Funk"
4. "Let's Ride (Instrumental)"
