= Fa All Y'all =

Single by Da Brat

from the album Funkdafied
- Released: August 25, 1994
- Recorded: 1994
- Genre: G-funk
- Length: 3:19
- Label: So So Def Recordings
- Songwriters: Jermaine Dupri; Shawntae Harris
- Producer: Jermaine Dupri

Da Brat singles chronology
"Funkdafied" (1994)	"Fa All Y'all" (1994)	"Give It 2 You" (1995)

Music video
- "Fa All Y'all" on YouTube

"Fa All Y'all" is a song by American rapper Da Brat, released in August 1994, by So So Def Recordings, as the second single from her debut album, Funkdafied (1994). The song features backing vocals from Xscape member Kandi Burruss, as well as Jermaine Dupri, Raven-Symoné and Manuel Seal, Jr. It was written by Da Brat and Dupri and produced by Dupri, featuring a sample from "Heartbreaker" by Zapp.

== Critical reception ==
Pan-European magazine Music & Media wrote, "Da fonkee gal raps on top of the fattest slice of P-funk you've heard all year. May it become the female complement to Johnny "Guitar" Watson's '70s classic 'Real Mother for Ya'."

== Chart performance ==
"Fa All Y'all" was the follow-up to Da Brat's successful debut single "Funkdafied" which charted at No. 6 on the US Billboard Hot 100 and reached platinum status during the summer of 1994. The single was released in September of that year, and although it did not match the success of "Funkdafied", the song nevertheless became Da Brat's second top 40 hit, reaching No. 37 on the Billboard Hot 100, where it spent 12 weeks.

== Music video ==
The accompanying music video for "Fa All Y'all" was directed by Ken Fox and premiered in late 1994.

== Single track listing ==
=== G-Rated side ===
1. "Fa All Y'All" (G-Rated Extended Club Mix) 4:55
2. "Fa All Y'All" (G-Rated LP Version)- 3:25
3. "Fa All Y'All" (G-Rated Remix)- 3:14

=== R-Rated side ===
1. "Fa All Y'All" (R-Rated Remix)- 2:43
2. "Fa All Y'All" (R-Rated LP Version)- 3:20
3. "Fa All Y'All" (R-Rated A Cappella)- 3:14

== Charts ==
Chart (1994)	Peak position
Canada Retail Singles (The Record)	18
US Billboard Hot 100	37
US Dance Singles Sales (Billboard)	11
US Hot R&B/Hip-Hop Songs (Billboard)	18
US Hot Rap Songs (Billboard)	5
US Rhythmic Airplay (Billboard)	16
US Cash Box Top 100	42
