= What'chu Like =

Single by Da Brat featuring Tyrese

from the album Unrestricted
- Released: March 30, 1999
- Recorded: 1999
- Genre: Hip-hop; R&B
- Length: 3:41
- Label: So So Def
- Songwriters: Shawntae Harris; Jermaine Mauldin; Jurgen Korduletsch; Joerg Evers
- Producers: Jermaine Dupri; Bryan-Michael Cox

Da Brat singles chronology
"It’s Nothing" (1999)	"What'chu Like" (1999)	"That's What I'm Looking For" (2000)

"What'chu Like" is the lead single released from Da Brat's third album, Unrestricted. The song features R&B singer Tyrese, who provided the song's hook.

== Background ==
Released on March 30, 1999, "What'chu Like" eventually reached No. 26 on the Billboard Hot 100 on August 12, 1999, becoming her sixth and final top 40 single. The song also reached No. 85 on the Billboard Year-End Hot 100 singles of 2000, becoming her third song to reach the Year-End charts after "Funkdafied" in 1994 and "Give It 2 You" in 1995. Like all of Da Brat's previous singles, Jermaine Dupri produced "What'chu Like", using a sample of Claudja Barry's "Love for the Sake of Love" which was also used for Montell Jordan's "Get It On Tonite" only months prior.

== Charts ==
=== Weekly charts ===
Chart (2000)	Peak position
Canada (Nielsen SoundScan)	47
Belgium (Ultratop 50 Flanders)	45
Belgium (Ultratop 50 Wallonia)	31
Netherlands (Dutch Top 40)	9
Netherlands (Single Top 100)	9
US Billboard Hot 100	26
US Hot R&B/Hip-Hop Songs (Billboard)	9
US Hot Rap Songs (Billboard)	11
US Rhythmic Airplay (Billboard)	7

=== Year-end charts ===
Chart (2000)	Position
Netherlands (Dutch Top 40)	59
Netherlands (Single Top 100)	53
US Billboard Hot 100	85
US Hot R&B/Hip-Hop Songs (Billboard)	35
