= Anuthatantrum =

Studio album by Da Brat
- Released: October 29, 1996
- Recorded: 1995–1996
- Studios: KrossWire Studio (Atlanta, Georgia)
- Genre: Hip-hop
- Length: 33:39
- Labels: So So Def; Columbia; Sony
- Producer: Jermaine Dupri

Da Brat chronology
Funkdafied (1994)	Anuthatantrum (1996)	Unrestricted (2000)

Singles from Anuthatantrum
- 1. "Sittin' on Top of the World" Released: September 24, 1996; 2. "Ghetto Love" Released: March 1, 1997

Anuthatantrum is the second studio album by Da Brat. It was released in 1996 and went Gold in 1997. A single culled from the album was "Ghetto Love", which featured TLC member Tionne Watkins. The album peaked at number 20 on the Billboard 200.

== Critical reception ==
Professional ratings
Review scores
Source	Rating
AllMusic	4/5 stars
Chicago Tribune	2/4 stars
Entertainment Weekly	C
Muzik	2/5 stars
The Rolling Stone Album Guide	2.5/5 stars
The Source	3.5/5 stars

AllMusic writer Steve Huey called it "a slight improvement" over her debut record Funkdafied, praising Dupri's beats for going into an "early-'80s urban funk direction" and Da Brat's lyricism being bereft of any "old-school quotes and obvious Snoop Dogg bites" and having more of a focused identity, concluding that, "[I]t's another brief album, but Anuthatantrum does show Da Brat making subtle progress, and Dupri's production is inviting once again." J. D. Considine, writing for Entertainment Weekly, gave credit to the "funky foundation of [Jermaine] Dupri's tuneful, efficient backing tracks" for making Da Brat's "bluster than menace" gangster boasts come across as more tolerable. Martin Johnson of the Chicago Tribune wrote that: "On her debut recording, her flow worked solely with basic George Clinton samples, but on the follow-up she rhymes in a variety of styles and her vocabulary has improved. Sadly, these skills are wasted on narrow and cliched subject matter, such as people who don't like her and people who don't respect her."

== Track listing ==
No.	Title	Writer(s)	Producer(s)	Length
1.	"Anuthatantrum"	Da Brat; Jermaine Dupri; Sting	Jermaine Dupri; Carl-So-Lowe^{[c]}	1:10
2.	"My Beliefs"	Da Brat; Dupri	Dupri; Carl-So-Lowe^{[c]}	4:03
3.	"Sittin' on Top of the World"	Da Brat; Dupri; Rick James	Dupri; Carl-So-Lowe^{[c]}	4:16
4.	"Let's All Get High" (featuring Krayzie Bone)	Da Brat; Dupri; Krayzie Bone; Roger Troutman	Dupri; Carl-So-Lowe^{[c]}	3:44
5.	"Westside Interlude"		Dupri	0:13
6.	"Just a Little Bit More"	Da Brat; Dupri; Isaac Hayes; Adrienne Anderson	Dupri; Carl-So-Lowe^{[c]}	3:26
7.	"Keepin' it Live"	Da Brat; Dupri	Dupri	3:36
8.	"Ghetto Love" (featuring Tionne "T-Boz" Watkins)	Da Brat; Chuck D.; El DeBarge; Hank Shocklee; B. Wright	Dupri; Carl-So-Lowe^{[c]}	3:21
9.	"Lyrical Molestation"	Da Brat; Dupri; Ian Carr; Sean "Puffy" Combs; Hubert Magidson; Nasheim Myrick; Christopher Wallace; Allie Wrubel	Dupri	3:47
10.	"Live it Up"	Da Brat; Dupri; Chris Stein; Akinyele	Dupri	2:32
11.	"Make it Happen"	Da Brat; Dupri; David Snell	Dupri	3:30

Notes

- ^{^[c]}signifies a co-producer
- "Sittin' on Top of the World" features additional vocals from Manuel Seal
- Just a Little Bit More" features background vocals from Trey Lorenz
- "Keepin' it Live" features background vocals from Manuel Seal

Sample credits

- "Anuthatantrum" contains a sample of "The Soul Cages" by Sting
- "Sittin' on Top of the World" contains a sample of "Mary Jane" by Rick James
- "Let's All Get High" contains a sample of "Be Alright" written by Roger Troutman, performed by Zapp
- "Just a Little Bit More" contains a sample of "Déjà Vu" written by Isaac Hayes and Adrienne Anderson, performed by Dionne Warwick
- "Ghetto Love" contains samples of "All This Love" by DeBarge and "Public Enemy No. 1" by Public Enemy
- "Lyrical Molestation" contains samples of "Roots" by Ian Carr and "Who Shot Ya?" by The Notorious B.I.G.
- "Live It Up" contains a sample of "Put It in Your Mouth" by Akinyele
- "Make It Happen" contains a sample of "Crab Apple Jam" by David Snell

== AnuthaFunkdafiedTantrum ==
Disc 1

1. "Fa All Y'All"
2. "Funkdafied"
3. "Mind Blowin'"
4. "Give it 2 You Remix"
5. "Da B Side"

Disc 2

1. "Sittin' on Top of the World"
2. "Let's Get High"
3. "Just a Lil' Bit More"
4. "Ghetto Love" (feat. T-Boz)
5. "Make it Happen"

== Personnel ==
Credits adapted from the liner notes of Anuthatantrum.

- LaMarquis Jefferson – bass (3, 7)
- Carl-So-Lowe – keyboards (3)
- Phil Tan – engineer, mixing
- John Frye – assistant engineer
- Brian Frye – assistant engineer
- Bernie Grundman – mastering
- Erwin Gorostiza – art direction and design
- Silvia Otte – photography
- Byron Gillison – Anuthatantrum logotype design

== Charts ==
Weekly chart performance for Anuthatantrum
Chart (1996)	Peak position
Canada Top Albums/CDs (RPM)	90
US Billboard 200	20
US Top R&B/Hip-Hop Albums (Billboard)	5

== Certifications ==
Certifications and sales for Anuthatantrum
Region	Certification	Certified units/sales
United States (RIAA)	Gold	500,000^{^}
^{^} Shipments figures based on certification alone.
