= Don't Do It =

Studio album by Richie Rich
- Released: January 1, 1990
- Recorded: 1988–1989
- Genre: West Coast hip hop, golden age hip hop, G-Funk
- Length: 48:03
- Label: Big League
- Producer: DJ Daryl; J.E.D.; Kirk "Kickin' Kirk" Crumpler

Richie Rich chronology
41Fivin (1990)	Don't Do It (1990)	Half Thang (1996)

Singles from Don't Do It
- 1. "Don't Do It" / "415" Released: 1990; 2. "Geeks Revenge (Rodney)" / "Female F.E.D." Released: 1990

Professional ratings
Review scores
Source	Rating
AllMusic	3/5 stars

Don't Do It is the debut solo album by American rapper Richie Rich. The album was released in 1990 on Big League Records.

== Track listing ==
1. "Don't Do It" – 4:06
2. "Rodney the Geek" – 4:30
3. "Free at Last" – 5:14
4. "Media Hype" (featuring D-Loc) – 4:19
5. "The Mic Is Mine" – 4:26
6. "Lady Ace" (featuring Lady Ace) – 2:09
7. "Female F.E.D." – 4:06
8. "Side Show" – 3:55
9. "The Picnic" – 4:26
10. "5 MC's" (featuring D-Loc) – 4:12
11. "Don't Do It" (long version)

== Samples ==
Don't Do It

- "Outstanding" by The Gap Band

5MC's

- "La Di Da Di" by Doug E. Fresh and Slick Rick
- "Dana Dane With Fame" by Dana Dane

The Mic Is Mine

- "La Di Da Di" by Doug E. Fresh and Slick Rick
- "Before I Let Go" by Maze
