= Seasoned Veteran =

Studio album by Richie Rich
- Released: November 5, 1996
- Recorded: 1995–1996
- Genre: West Coast hip hop, Rap, Gangsta rap
- Length: 60:10
- Label: Def Jam
- Producer: Ali Malik, DJ Daryl, Doug Rasheed, Jermaine Dupri, Kevin "Lipper" Washington (exec.), Lev Berlak, Mike Mosley, Richie Rich (exec.), Rick Rock, Tina Davis (exec.)

Richie Rich chronology
Half Thang (1996)	Seasoned Veteran (1996)	Big League Records Greatest Hits (1999)

Singles from Seasoned Veteran
- 1. "Let's Ride"/"Funk" Released: November 12, 1996; 2. "Do G's Get To Go To Heaven?" Released: February 11, 1997; 3. "Touch Myself (Remix)"/"Touch Myself" Released: 1997; 4. "Niggas Done Changed"/"Real Pimp" Released: 1997

Seasoned Veteran is the third studio album by American rapper Richie Rich. It was released November 5, 1996 on Def Jam Recordings, and to date is the only major label release for the artist. The album was produced by Ali Malik, DJ Daryl, Doug Rasheed, Jermaine Dupri, Lev Berlak, Mike Mosley, Richie Rich and Rick Rock. It peaked at number 11 on the Billboard Top R&B/Hip-Hop Albums and at number 35 on the Billboard 200. Two of the singles released, "Let's Ride" and "Do G's Get To Go To Heaven?", both appeared on multiple Billboard singles charts. The album features guest performances by 2Pac, E-40, Luniz, D'wayne Wiggins, T-Boz, and Rame Royal of Rhythm & Green.

Along with the single, a music video was produced for the song, "Let's Ride". A second single, "Do G's Get To Go To Heaven?", was also released as a music video, featuring Bo-Roc, and is dedicated to the memory of Tupac Shakur.

In the song "Niggas Done Changed" Feat. Tupac, 2Pac predicts his own death by saying “I been shot and murdered, can't tell you how it happened, word for word / But best believe niggas gonna get what they deserve.”

== Critical reception ==
Professional ratings
Review scores
Source	Rating
AllMusic	3/5 stars
The Source	3.5/5 stars

Miguel Burke of The Source magazine described Seasoned Veteran as "one of the few albums available in the reality rap genre that lives up to its name and comes close to meeting the listener's expectations", but criticized the production that "can't handle the weight of the lyrical content".

== Track listing ==
#	Title	Producer	Featured guest	Length
1	"Intro"	Lev Berlak, Richie Rich		1:39
2	"Funk"	DJ Daryl		5:45
3	"It's On"	DJ Daryl	E-40	4:40
4	"Let's Ride"	Ali Malik		4:34
5	"30 Minutes (Skit)"	Richie Rich		1:21
6	"Real Pimp"	DJ Daryl, Richie Rich		4:37
7	"Guess Who's Back"	Lev Berlak, Richie Rich		5:17
8	"Fresh Out"	DJ Daryl		4:11
9	"Niggas Done Changed"	Rick Rock	2Pac	4:53
10	"Pillow"	DJ Daryl	Rame Royal, D'wayne Wiggins	4:49
11	"Check 'Em'"	DJ Daryl		4:33
12	"Real Shit"	Lev Berlak		2:10
13	"Questions"	Doug Rasheed	Luniz	4:15
14	"It's Not About You"	Lev Berlak, Richie Rich		4:13
15	"Do G's Get To Go To Heaven?"	Mike Mosley, Richie Rich	Bo-Roc	5:59
16	"Touch Myself (Remix)"	Jermaine Dupri	T-Boz, Jermaine Dupri	4:11

== Samples ==
Fresh Out

- "For the Love of Money" by The O'Jays

Let's Ride

- "(Not Just) Knee Deep" by Funkadelic

Pillow

- "(Lay Your Head on My) Pillow" by Tony! Toni! Toné!

== Chart history ==
Album

Chart (1996)	Peak position
U.S. Billboard 200	35
U.S. Billboard Top R&B/Hip-Hop Albums	11

Singles

Song	Chart (1996)	Peak position
"Let's Ride"	U.S. Billboard Hot 100	74
"Let's Ride"	U.S. Billboard Hot R&B/Hip-Hop Songs	55
"Let's Ride"	U.S. Billboard Rap Songs	8
Song	Chart (1997)	Peak position
"Do G's Get To Go To Heaven?"	U.S. Billboard Hot 100	57
"Do G's Get To Go To Heaven?"	U.S. Billboard Hot R&B/Hip-Hop Songs	37
"Do G's Get To Go To Heaven?"	U.S. Billboard Rap Songs	10
"Let's Ride"	U.S. Billboard Hot 100	67
"Let's Ride"	U.S. Billboard Hot R&B/Hip-Hop Songs	69
"Let's Ride"	U.S. Billboard Rap Songs	15

== Personnel ==
- Richie Rich - vocals, producer, assistant producer, executive producer
- Tina Davis - producer, assistant producer, executive producer, project supervisor
- Kevin "Lipper" Washington - producer, assistant producer, executive producer
- 2Pac - vocals
- Bo-Roc - background vocals
- D'wayne Wiggins - guitar, background vocals
- E-40 - vocals
- Jermaine Dupri - producer, background vocals
- Luniz - vocals
- Simply E - background vocals
- T-Boz - vocals
- Ali Malik - producer
- DJ Daryl - producer, assistant producer
- Lev Berlak - producer, assistant producer
- Rick Rock - producer
- Joseph "Amp" Fiddler - keyboards, bass
- Dorothy Low - photography
- The Drawing Board - design
- John "Indo" Neilson - engineer, mixing
- Darren "Digital D" Harris - engineer, mixing
- Joseph "Amp" Fiddler - keyboards
- Femi Ojtune - keyboards
- Phil Tan - mixing
