= MC Luscious =

American rapper

MC Luscious (born Rosalyn McCall) is an American Miami bass recording artist from Miami, Florida.

== Discography ==
=== Albums ===
- Boom! (1989/1991)
- Back to Boom (1993)
- Lollypop (1995)

=== Singles ===
- "Da' Dip"
- "Boom! I Got Your Boyfriend"

== Charts ==
=== Albums ===
- 1992 Boom! Heatseekers 28

=== Singles ===
- 1997 "Da Dip" Hot R&B/Hip-Hop Singles & Tracks 63
- 1997 "Da Dip" Hot Rap Singles 16
- 1997 "Da Dip" Billboard Hot 100 82
- 1997 "Da' Dip" Hot R&B/Hip-Hop Singles & Tracks 67
- 1997 "Da' Dip" Hot Rap Singles 15
- 1997 "Da' Dip" Billboard Hot 100 87
- 1992 "Boom! I Got Your Boyfriend" Hot R&B/Hip-Hop Singles & Tracks 78
- 1992 "Boom! I Got Your Boyfriend" The Billboard Hot 100 61
