= Unrestricted (Da Brat album) =

Studio album by Da Brat
- Released: April 11, 2000
- Recorded: 1999–2000
- Genre: Hip hop
- Length: 52:31
- Label: So So Def; Columbia
- Producer: Timbaland; Deric Angelettie; Jermaine Dupri; Bryan-Michael Cox; Carl-So-Lowe; Kanye West

Da Brat chronology
Anuthatantrum (1996)	Unrestricted (2000)	Limelite, Luv & Niteclubz (2003)

Singles from Unrestricted
- 1. "That's What I'm Looking For" Released: January 25, 2000; 2. "What'chu Like" Released: March 30, 2000

Professional ratings
Review scores
Source	Rating
Allmusic	3/5 stars
Melody Maker	3/5 stars
RapReviews	(6.5/10)
Rolling Stone	3/5 stars
The Rolling Stone Album Guide	3/5 stars
USA Today	3/4 stars
Vibe	(favorable)

Unrestricted is the third studio album by rapper Da Brat. It was released on April 11, 2000. On September 21, 2001, it was certified platinum by the RIAA.

== Track listing ==
No.	Title	Lyrics	Music	Producer(s)	Length
1.	"Intro" (featuring Millie Jackson and Twista)	Da Brat; Twista; Millie Jackson	Tim Mosley	Timbaland; Jermaine Dupri	1:59
2.	"We Ready" (featuring JD and Lil Jon)	Da Brat; Jermaine Dupri	Jermaine Dupri; Kenneth Edmonds; Antonio Reid; Daryl Simmons; Shuggie Otis	Jermaine Dupri; Carl So-Lowe^{[a]}	4:02
3.	"What'chu Like" (featuring Tyrese)	Da Brat; Dupri	Dupri; Jörg Evers; Jürgen Korduletsch	Jermaine Dupri; Bryan-Michael Cox^{[a]}	3:57
4.	"At the Club (Interlude)"		Dupri; Willie Hutch		0:38
5.	"Fuck You"	Da Brat; Dupri	Dupri; Braulino Lima	Jermaine Dupri	3:08
6.	"Back Up" (featuring Ja Rule and Tamara Savage)	Da Brat; Dupri; Ja Rule	Dupri; Carl Lowe	Jermaine Dupri	4:12
7.	"Hands in the Air" (featuring Mystikal)	Da Brat; Mystikal	Deric Angelettie	Deric "D-Dot" Angelettie	3:49
8.	"Runnin' Out of Time" (featuring Kelly Price)	Da Brat	Aaron Pittman	Aaron "Hitman" Pittman	4:15
9.	"That's What I'm Looking For"	Da Brat; Dupri	Dupri	Jermaine Dupri	3:44
10.	"Breeve On 'Em" (featuring 22)	Da Brat	Pittman	Aaron "Hitman" Pittman	4:17
11.	"What's On Ya Mind" (featuring 22, LaTocha Scott, and Trey Lorenz)	Da Brat; Dupri	Dupri	Jermaine Dupri; Carl So-Lowe^{[a]}	4:08
12.	"Leave Me Alone (Interlude)"				0:16
13.	"High Come Down" (featuring LaTocha Scott and Trey Lorenz)	Da Brat; Dupri	Dupri; Michael Jones	Jermaine Dupri	3:06
14.	"All My Bitches"	Da Brat; Dupri	Dupri; Bryan-Michael Cox	Jermaine Dupri; Bryan-Michael Cox^{[a]}	3:57
15.	"Pink Lemonade" (featuring Debra Killings)	Da Brat; Dupri	Dupri; Lowe	Jermaine Dupri; Carl So-Lowe^{[a]}	3:53
16.	"A Word From ... Da Bishop Don "Magic" Juan (Interlude)"				0:19
17.	"Chi Town" (featuring LaJoyce)	Da Brat	Kanye West; Leo Graham; Eddie Fisher	Kanye West	4:08

- ^{^a} signifies a co-producer

Sample credits

- "We Ready" embodies portions of "Love Saw It", written by Antonio Reid, Daryl Simmons, and Kenneth Edmonds; and contains an interpolation of "Strawberry Letter 23", written by Shuggie Otis.
- "What'chu Like" contains a portion of "Love for the Sake of Love", written by Jörg Evers and Jürgen Korduletsch.
- "At the Club (Interlude)" features samples from "Easy Does It", written and recorded by Willie Hutch.
- "Fuck You" embodies portions of "Tic, Tic Tac", written by Braulino Lima.
- "High Come Down" embodies portions of "Love Come Down", written by Michael Jones.
- "Chi Town" embodies portions of "Really Gonna Miss You", written by Leo Graham and Eddie Fisher.

== Charts ==
=== Weekly charts ===
Chart (2000)	Peak position
Canadian R&B Albums (Nielsen SoundScan)	15
Dutch Albums (Album Top 100)	55
US Billboard 200	5
US Top R&B/Hip-Hop Albums (Billboard)	1

=== Year-end charts ===
Chart (2000)	Position
US Billboard 200	105
US Top R&B/Hip-Hop Albums	35

== Certifications ==
Region	Certification	Certified units/sales
United States (RIAA)	Platinum	915,000
