= Tionne Watkins =

American singer (born 1970)

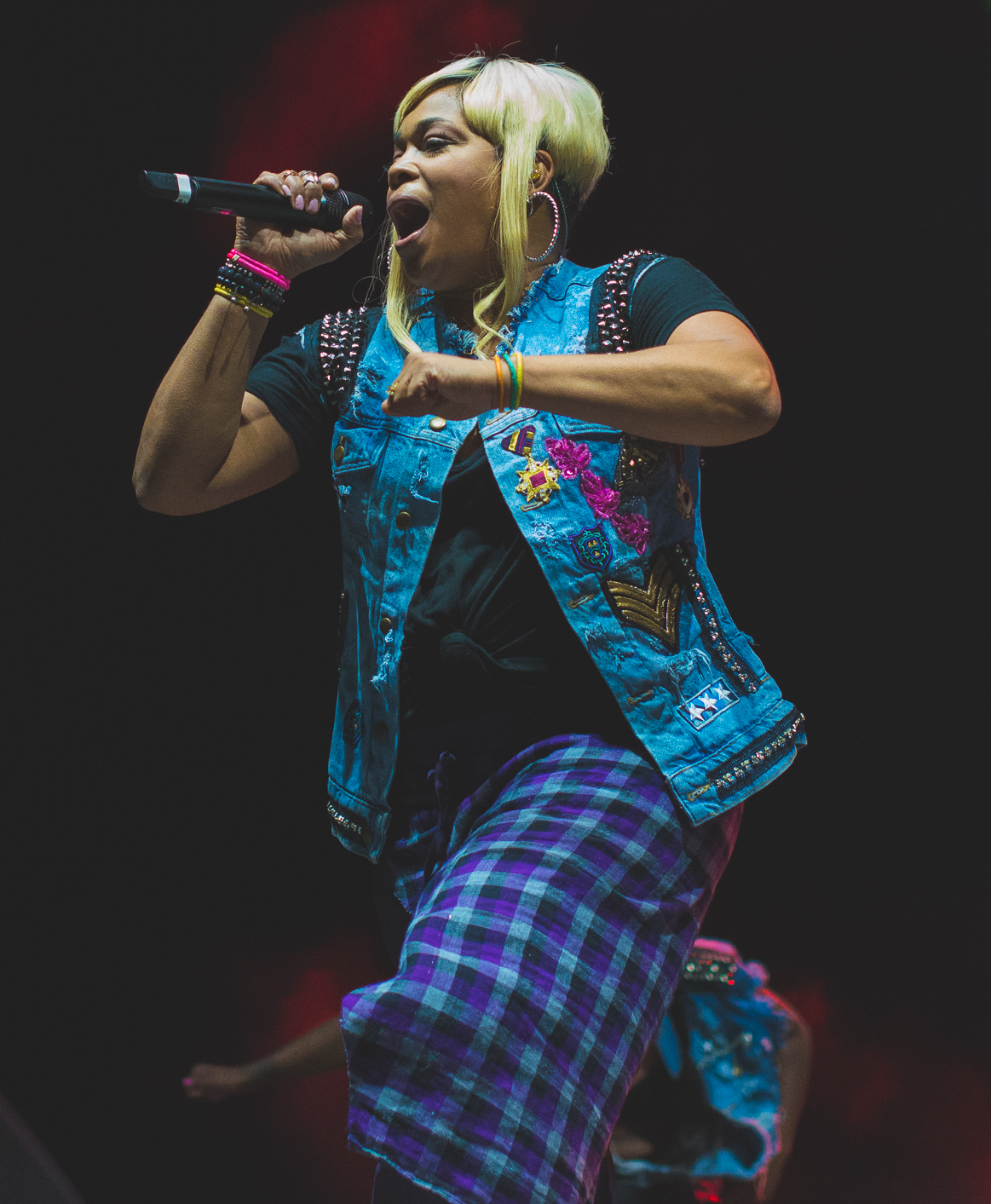
- Watkins performing in 2016
- Born: Tionne Tenese Watkins; April 26, 1970 (age 56); Des Moines, Iowa, U.S.
- Other names: T-Boz; Tionne Rolison
- Occupations: Singer; songwriter; actress
- Spouse: Mack 10 (m. 2000; div. 2004)
- Children: 1
- Musical career
- Origin: Atlanta, Georgia, U.S.
- Genres: R&B; pop; hip hop; soul
- Years active: 1990–present
- Label: Epic
- Member of: TLC

Tionne Tenese Watkins (born April 26, 1970), also known by her stage name T-Boz, is an American singer and actress. Watkins rose to fame in the early 1990s as a member of the best selling girl group TLC, with whom she won four Grammy Awards. As a solo artist, she reached the Billboard Hot 100 with "Touch Myself" in 1996, and as a featured artist on Da Brat's 1997 single, "Ghetto Love".

== Early life ==
Tionne Watkins was born in Des Moines, Iowa, on April 26, 1970, to James and Gayle Watkins. She has written that she is of African American, Native American and Irish descent. Her parents divorced when she was three years old. Watkins' mother moved her from Des Moines to Atlanta, when she was nine years old, after living in California and Houston for a short time. As a teen, she worked as an apprentice in an Atlanta hair salon, participating in hair shows and competition. She won her first competition at the age of 14. Watkins also attended Cosmetology school and worked at a local McDonald's before becoming a music artist.

== Career ==
=== TLC ===
Crystal Jones held auditions for a singing group and chose Watkins, and Lisa Lopes. The group eventually attracted the attention of Perri "Pebbles" Reid and her husband, Antonio "L.A." Reid, head of LaFace Records. Jones was replaced with Rozonda Thomas and the group was signed in 1991 as TLC. In order to preserve the TLC name, Watkins is now named "T-Boz", while Lopes became "Left Eye" and Thomas became "Chilli". The successful group sold more than 65 million records. T-Boz has won four Grammy Awards as a member of TLC. Since Lopes' death in 2002, T-Boz and Chilli have performed as a duo.

In late 2011, VH1 announced plans to produce a biopic on the group. Watkins and Thomas signed on as producers. The film, CrazySexyCool: The TLC Story, premiered October 21, 2013. The role of Watkins was portrayed by actress/singer Drew Sidora. Watkins' daughter, Chase, portrayed a younger Tionne in the film.

=== Solo work ===
In addition to her work with TLC, Watkins has recorded solo singles like "Touch Myself" (for the soundtrack of the 1996 film Fled) and "My Getaway" (for the soundtrack of the 2000 film Rugrats in Paris: The Movie). Additionally, she has been a featured vocalist on songs such as "Ghetto Love" with Da Brat, "Changes" with Society of Soul, "He Say She Say" with Keith Sweat, "Different Times" with Raphael Saadiq and "Be Somebody" with Paula Cole. She also featured on the song "It's Good" by YoungBloodZ. On January 22, 2013, Watkins released her first solo single in over 15 years titled "Champion". The song was released digitally, and proceeds went to help raise awareness for people suffering from blood conditions such as sickle cell and leukemia. On September 6, 2017, Watkins digitally released her latest single titled "Dreams" from her audiobook A Sick Life.

On July 6, 2026, Watkins appeared in a Missy Elliott-curated Aaliyah tribute, speaking via a video montage, for the finale at that year's Essence Festival of Culture.

=== Television and film ===
Watkins has worked as an actress, appearing in Hype Williams' 1998 film Belly. She also appeared in two episodes of Living Single, the first time guest-starring along with her bandmates and another time without them. Watkins served as one of the executive producers for the 2006 movie ATL featuring the rapper T.I. She also appeared on The Real Housewives of Atlanta as a friend of Kandi Burruss. Watkins made a guest appearance as Pam Grier in one episode of the Adult Swim series Black Dynamite. In 2009, Watkins was a participant in the eighth season of The Apprentice, finishing in 11th place. Watkins' reality TV show, Totally T-Boz, premiered January 1, 2013, on the TLC network, and ran four episodes. The show chronicled Watkins' quest to create a solo album, reunite with bandmember, Chilli, and her life with her daughter Chase.

In 2016, Watkins and Chili joined actress Zoe Saldaña onstage for her second round performance of "No Scrubs" on Spike's Lip Sync Battle against actor Zachary Quinto. In November 2016, she began a two-month acting stint as Sheila, a hardened prison inmate, on Days of Our Lives. Watkins would later return to Days of Our Lives as a recurring character, playing the zany ex-con Sheila, in both 2017 and 2018. In 2017, she lent her voice to a character in Trolland, also known as Trollz, a direct-to-DVD CGI-animated movie.

== Other work ==
Watkins published a book of semi-autobiographical poetry called Thoughts on November 3, 1999. In 2005, Watkins and stylist Tara Brivic (who would later appear regularly on Totally T-Boz) opened a children's boutique called Chase's Closet (named after her daughter). It was shut down years later. TLC also released a soundtrack album 20 marking both the band's 20-plus year legacy in entertainment business and the release of their biopic, this album included a new track written by singer Ne-Yo, "Meant to Be". They also had guest vocals on J. Cole's track "Crooked Smile". TLC celebrated their return with a series of highly publicized performances which included 2 dates: VH1's Mixtape Festival in Hershey, Pennsylvania, on July 27, 2013, and Drake's OVO Fest in Toronto on August 5, 2013. They released an album, TLC, on June 30, 2017.

== Personal life ==
As a child, Watkins was diagnosed with sickle cell anemia. Since the age of seven, she has been in and out of the hospital due to the painful condition. T-Boz opened up to the public about the disease in 1996; she later became one of the spokespersons for Sickle Cell Disease Association of America. In 2002, she was hospitalized for four months due to a flare-up of sickle-cell anemia. She is a national co-chair of the progressive organization Health Care Voter.

On August 19, 2000, Watkins married rapper Mack 10 in California. The couple's daughter, Chase, was born prematurely in 2000. In June 2004, she filed for divorce, and requested a restraining order against the rapper. In 2012, Watkins moved with Chase from Atlanta to Los Angeles, California, in order for Chase to be closer to her father.

In October 2009, Watkins said that she had had a potentially fatal brain tumor for three years. In March 2006, she was diagnosed as having a grape-sized acoustic neuroma on her vestibular nerve that affected her balance, weight, hearing, sight, and facial movement. Many physicians refused to remove the tumor due to her sickle-cell-related complications. Ultimately, she underwent surgery at Cedars-Sinai Hospital in Los Angeles.

Watkins filed for bankruptcy in February 2011 and again in October 2011. In an episode of the Reelz TV series Broke & Famous, entertainment reporter Viviana Vigil stated Watkins spent $9,000 a month and owed $770,000 on her home with a reported monthly income of $11,000, while another reporter Nina Parker cited Watkins's medical bills and brain tumor.

In June 2016, Watkins announced that she adopted a 10-month-old boy.

== Publication ==
- Watkins, Tionne (1999). Thoughts. HarperEntertainment. ISBN 978-0-06-105183-8.
- Watkins, Tionne (2017). A Sick Life: TLC 'n Me: Stories from On and Off the Stage. Rodale Books. ISBN 978-1-62336-860-9.

== Discography ==
=== Singles ===
==== As lead artist ====
List of singles as a lead artist, with selected chart positions, showing year released and album name
Title	Year	Peak chart positions				Album
Title	Year	US	US R&B/HH	AUS	UK	Album
"Touch Myself"	1996	40	23	—	48	Fled
"My Getaway"	2000	—	79	86	44	Rugrats in Paris: The Movie: Music from the Motion Picture
"Champion"	2013	—	—	—	—	Non-album singles
"Dreams"	2017	—	—	—	—	Non-album singles

==== As featured artist ====
List of singles as a featured artist, with selected chart positions, showing year released and album name
Title	Year	Peak chart positions			Album
Title	Year	US	US R&B/HH	US Rap	Album
"Touch Myself" (Remix) (Richie Rich featuring T-Boz and Jermaine Dupri)	1996	—	—	—	Seasoned Veteran
"Ghetto Love" (Da Brat featuring T-Boz)	1997	16	11	4	Anuthatantrum
"Tight to Def" (Mack 10 featuring T-Boz)	2000	—	65	—	The Paper Route
"Someday" (DJ Deckstream featuring T-Boz)	2009	—	—	—	Deckstream Soundtracks 2

=== Guest appearances ===
List of non-single guest appearances, with other performing artists, showing year released and album name
Title	Year	Other artist(s)	Album
"Word to the Badd"	1991	Jermaine Jackson	You Said
"Changes"	1995	Society of Soul	Brainchild
"Be Somebody"	1999	Paula Cole	Amen
"He Say She Say"	2000	Keith Sweat	Didn't See Me Coming
"Wanna Take Me Back"	2000	Non-album single	Backstage: Music Inspired by the Film
"Different Times"	2002	Raphael Saadiq	Instant Vintage
"It's Good"	2005	YoungBloodZ	Ev'rybody Know Me
"Red Planet"	2012	Little Mix	DNA
"Creep"	2015	Eric Bellinger	Cuffing Season

=== Music videos ===
Year	Video	Director
1997	"Ghetto Love" (with Da Brat)	Gustavo Garzon

== Filmography ==
=== Film ===
Year	Title	Role
1994	House Party 3	Sex as a Weapon (as TLC)
1998	Belly	Tionne
2016	Trolland	Jarvik (voice)
2021	After Masks	Cheryl

=== Television ===
Year	Title	Role	Notes
1992	CBS Schoolbreak Special	1st Rapper (as TLC)	Episode: "Words Up!"
1992	Out All Night	Herself (as TLC)	Episode: "Pilot"
1992	Showtime at the Apollo	Herself (as TLC)	Episode: "#6.12"
1995	Living Single	Herself (as TLC)	Episode: "The Following Is a Sponsored Program"
1997	Living Single	The Hitchhiker	Episode: "Three Men and a Buckeye"
1999	Ultra Sound	Herself (as TLC)	Episode: "TLC: You've Got Mail"
1999–2004	Behind the Music	Herself	Episode: "TLC" & "TLC: The Final Chapter"
2000	Sally Jessy Raphael	Herself	Episode: "I'm 13 and Too Ugly to Live!"
2001	Top Ten	Herself	Episode: "Girl Bands"
2003	Born to Diva	Judge	TV Series
2003	Inside Out	Herself	Episode: "Toni Braxton: Family Comes First"
2005	R U the Girl	Herself/hostess	TV Series
2009	The Apprentice	Herself/Contestant	Main Cast: Season 8
2009	The Real Housewives of Atlanta	Herself	Episode: "Unbeweavable"
2010	What Chilli Wants	Herself	Episode: "The Floyd Situation"
2013	Totally T-Boz	Herself	Main Cast
2014	Black Dynamite	Pam Grier / Anti-Bionic Girl	Episode: "Sweet Bill's Badass Singalong Song or Bill Cosby Ain't Himself"
2016	The Haunting of...	Herself	Episode: "The Haunting of Tionne T-Boz Watkins"
2017	Lip Sync Battle	Herself (as TLC)	Episode: "Zoe Saldana vs. Zachary Quinto"
2017	Hollywood Medium with Tyler Henry	Herself	Episode: "Mel B/Reza Farahan/Jana Kramer/Tionne "T-Boz" Watkins"
2019	Growing Up Hip Hop: Atlanta	Herself	2 Episodes
2016–20	Days of Our Lives	Sheila Watkins	Regular Cast

=== Video games ===
Year	Title	Role
2026	Grand Theft Auto VI	Herself
