= Funkdafied =

Studio album by Da Brat
- Released: June 28, 1994
- Recorded: 1993–1994
- Genres: Hip hop; G-funk
- Length: 31:19
- Labels: So So Def; Columbia; Sony
- Producers: Jermaine Dupri; Manuel Seal (co.)

Da Brat chronology
Funkdafied (1994)	Anuthatantrum (1996)

Singles from Funkdafied
- 1. "Funkdafied" Released: May 13, 1994; 2. "Fa All Y'all" Released: August 25, 1994; 3. "Give It 2 You" Released: October 17, 1994

Funkdafied is the debut album by American rapper Da Brat. It was released on June 28, 1994, and sold over one million copies, making her the first solo female rapper to go Platinum. Funkdafied debuted and peaked at number 11 on the Billboard 200, and topped the Rap Charts and Top R&B/Hip-Hop Albums chart. The album was preceded by the first single, "Funkdafied", released on May 13, 1994. The single went Platinum in August and then the album went Platinum in January 1995.

== Critical reception ==
Professional ratings
Review scores
Source	Rating
AllMusic	4/5 stars
Robert Christgau	(neither)
Los Angeles Times	1.5/4 stars
Rolling Stone	(favorable)
The Rolling Stone Album Guide	2.5/5 stars

The Los Angeles Times noted, "Between the album's borrowed beats and one too many borrowed popular phrases, Funkdafied is less a tribute than a flagrant pilfering of some of rap's finest moments."

== Track listing ==
No.	Title	Writer(s)	Length
1.	"Da Shit Ya Can't Fuc Wit"	Jermaine Dupri	2:23
2.	"Fa All Y'all" (featuring Kandi Burruss)	Dupri; Da Brat	3:19
3.	"Fire It Up" / "Celebration Time"	Dupri; Da Brat; Anthony Kiedis; Michael Balzary; Chad Smith; John Frusciante	3:30
4.	"Funkdafied" (featuring Jermaine Dupri)	Dupri; Da Brat; O'Kelly Isley; Ronald Isley; Rudolph Isley; Ernie Isley; Marvin Isley; Chris Jasper	3:05
5.	"May da Funk Be wit 'Cha" (featuring LaTocha Scott)	Dupri; Da Brat	4:13
6.	"Ain't No Thang" (featuring Y-Tee)	Dupri; Da Brat; Jamahl Hanna	3:54
7.	"Come and Get Some" (featuring Mac Daddy)	Dupri; Da Brat; Chris Kelly; Lenny Kravitz; Lisa Bonet	3:12
8.	"Mind Blowin'"	Dupri; Da Brat	4:31
9.	"Give It 2 You"	Dupri; Kelly	3:13

Sample credits

- "Fire It Up" embodies a portion of:
  - "Under the Bridge", written by Anthony Kiedis, Michael Balzary, Chad Smith, and John Frusciante.
  - "Deeper", written by Jeffrey Fortson, Ricardo Royal, Roger Samuels, and Clarence Reid.
- "Funkdafied" embodies a portion of "Between the Sheets", written by O'Kelly Isley, Ronald Isley, Rudolph Isley, Ernie Isley, Marvin Isley, and Chris Jasper.
- "Come and Get Some" contains a sample taken from "Fear", written by Lenny Kravitz and Lisa Bonet, as recorded by Lenny Kravitz.

== Charts ==
=== Weekly charts ===
Chart (1994)	Peak position
Canada Top Albums/CDs (RPM)	48
US Billboard 200	11
US Top R&B/Hip-Hop Albums (Billboard)	1

=== Year-end charts ===
Chart (1994)	Position
US Top R&B/Hip-Hop Albums	23
Chart (1995)	Position
US Top R&B/Hip-Hop Albums	79

== Certifications ==
Region	Certification	Certified units/sales
United States (RIAA)	Platinum	1,100,000

== See also ==
- List of number-one R&B albums of 1994 (U.S.)
