= 415 (group) =

American hip hop group formed in Oakland, California in 1988

- Origin: Oakland, California, US
- Genres: West Coast hip hop; gangsta rap
- Years active: 1988–1991
- Labels: Priority Records, Big League Records, Inc.
- Members: Richie Rich; D-Loc; DJ Daryl; J. E. D.

415 was an American hip hop group formed in Oakland, California in 1988. The group was composed of rappers Richie Rich and D-Loc, and producers DJ Daryl and J.E.D.

== History ==
The group takes its name from area code 415, which served Oakland at the time of the group's formation. The group was noted by the media as one of the key players in the early West Coast hip hop scene. Their debut album 41Fivin was released in 1990. Richie Rich and D-Loc then released solo albums, with the various members of 415 all collaborating on each.

Later in 1990, the group attracted the interest of Priority Records and nearly signed a deal, but the deal fell through temporarily when Richie Rich was arrested for cocaine possession. Rich later claimed that his groupmates signed with Priority behind his back. Rich was sentenced to two years in prison, and 415 recorded their second album Nu Niggaz on tha Blokkk without him. That album was released in 1991 and reached the Billboard Top R&B/Hip-Hop Albums chart.

The group then broke up. After Richie Rich's release from prison, he embarked on a successful solo career with significant contributions from 415's DJ Daryl. Their 1990 song "Side Show" was the subject of a copyright lawsuit against Apple TV+ in 2020.

== Discography ==
=== Studio albums ===
- 41Fivin (1990)
- Nu Niggaz on tha Blokkk (1991)

=== Compilation albums ===
- Big League Records Greatest Hits (1999)
