= Richie Rich (rapper) =

American rapper

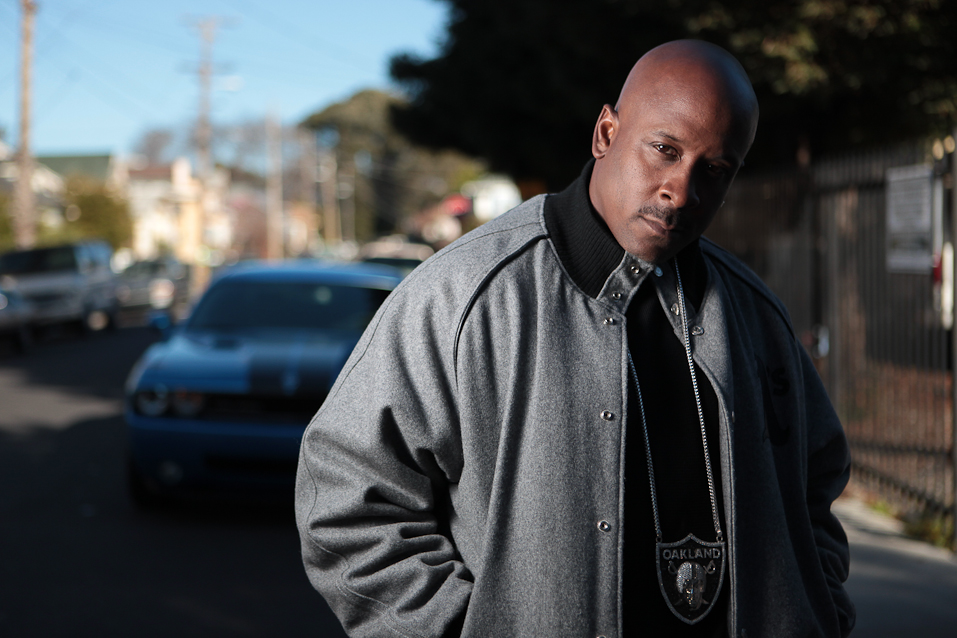
- Rich in 2011

Background information
- Born: Richard Serrell; June 25, 1967 (age 59); Las Palmas East Oakland, California, US
- Genres: West Coast hip hop; gangsta rap
- Occupation: Rapper
- Years active: 1988–present
- Labels: Hoo-Bangin'; Priority; Big League
- Website: dubbleworldwide.com

Richard Serrell (born June 25, 1967), professionally known as Richie Rich, is an American rapper.

== Music career ==
=== Early years (1987–1999) ===
In Oakland, Rich joined the group 415 in the late 1980s, collaborating with members D-Loc, DJ Daryl, and JED to craft an album in 1989 called 41Fivin. Rich released a solo album in 1990, titled Don't Do It.

His rapping style had an influence on Snoop Dogg, and the group 415 inspired the name of the group 213.

A cocaine possession conviction in 1990 put Rich in jail. 415 continued without him but did not flourish. Rich was released after a year and rapped on tracks by 2Pac and the Luniz. Rich soon found himself being in the middle of a bidding war between Def Jam Records and Relativity Records. He chose to go on Russell Simmons' label Def Jam. Before forming his own label, Oakland Hills 41510, he released his second solo album in 1996, Half Thang, which peaked on the Billboard Top R&B/Hip-Hop Albums at number 57.

By 1995, Rich had become the first Bay Area rapper to sign with New York's Def Jam Records, and his major-label album, Seasoned Veteran, was released in late 1996 Seasoned Veteran did rather well on the charts, and music videos were soon released for three songs on the album. Just as Rich's career was booming, a merger at Def Jam (with PolyGram) left him without much direction. Rich was going to release a second album on Def Jam, although it kept getting pushed back. He soon had the decision to stay or go, he decided to go.

=== Ten-Six Record years (1999–2004) ===
Rich then started his own label with partner Lev Berlak, named Ten-Six Records. Four years after Seasoned Veteran, his fourth album The Game was released. The album has sold over 300,000 units independently but was panned by critics and fans alike.

=== Recent events (2021–present) ===
In 2021, Rich's 1996 song "Let's Ride" was featured in the television series Blindspotting.

== Discography ==
=== Studio albums ===
- Don't Do It (1990)
- Half Thang (1996)
- Seasoned Veteran (1996)
- The Game (2000)
- Nixon Pryor Roundtree (2002)
- Fed Case (2017)
- Richard (2025)
- Richard (Deluxe) (2025)

=== Collaboration albums ===
- 41Fivin with 415 (1989)
- The Grow Room with The Mekanix (2020)
- The Grow Room (Instrumentals) with The Mekanix (2025)

=== Compilation albums ===
- Greatest Hits (2000)
- Grabs, Snatches, & Takes (2004)

=== Mixtapes ===
- Town Bidness (2010)
- Town Bidness (Volume 2) (2011)

=== Extended plays ===
- Geeks Revenge (Rodney) (1990)

=== Guest appearances ===
Year	Album	Song
1995	Me Against the World	"Heavy in the Game" (2Pac featuring Richie Rich, Eboni Foster and Lady Levi)
1995	Operation Stackola	"Pimps, Playas & Hustlas" (Luniz featuring Dru Down and Richie Rich)
1995	"I Got 5 on It"	"I Got 5 on It (Bay Ballas Remix)" (Luniz featuring Mike Marshall, Dru Down, E-40, Richie Rich, Shock G and Spice 1)
1996	All Eyez on Me	"Ratha Be Ya Nigga" (2Pac featuring Richie Rich, Ebony and Puff Johnson)
1996	All Eyez on Me	"Ain't Hard 2 Find" (2Pac featuring Richie Rich, B-Legit, E-40, D-Shot and C-Bo)
1996	NFL Jams	"Stay with Me" (Richie Rich and Esera Tuaolo)
1997	An Eye for an Eye	"More Game" (RBL Posse featuring Richie Rich)
1997	How to Be a Player	"Hard to Get" (Rick James and Richie Rich)
1997	R U Still Down? (Remember Me)	"Lie to Kick It" (2Pac featuring Richie Rich)
1997	Pre-Meditated Drama	"Trouble" (Steady Mobb'n featuring Richie Rich)
1997	Sky Ballin'	"Sky Ballin'" (Side 2 Syde featuring Richie Rich)
1997	Southwest Riders	"Yay Deep" (B-Legit and E-40 featuring Richie Rich)
1999	Bosses Will Be Bosses	"Haters" (The Delinquents featuring Richie Rich, Otis & Shug)
1999	Bosses Will Be Bosses	"Bitch Niggas" (The Delinquents featuring Richie Rich and B-Legit)
1999	Chronic 2000	"Gotta Love Gangsta's" (Tha Realest featuring Scarface and Richie Rich)
1999	That Was Then, This Is Now, Vol. 1	"Heart of a Savage" (Frost featuring Richie Rich, Mac Minister and B-Legit)
2000	The Thugz, Vol. 1	"Bitches" (MC Breed featuring Richie Rich and Too Short)
2001	It's Not What You Say... It's How You Say It	"Hold Off" (Mac Dre featuring Richie Rich)
2002	United Ghettos of America	"I'm So Cool" (Yukmouth featuring Dru Down, Lil' Ron and Richie Rich)
2004	United Ghettos of America, Vol. 2	"The Slide Show" (Yukmouth featuring C-Bo, Nate da Nut, Richie Rich)
2005	Smash Rockwell	"Oaktown" (Casual featuring E Mac, Richie Rich, Too Short and G-Stack)
2006	The Book of Life - Chapter 1	"Strike 3" (Remix) (Missippi featuring Richie Rich)
2008	Million Dollar Mouthpiece	"The Best Thang Goin'" (Yukmouth featuring Too Short, Devin the Dude, Richie Rich and Danica "The Morning Star")
2008	Million Dollar Mouthpiece	"East Oakland" (Yukmouth featuring Dru Down, Richie Rich, The Team, The Delinquents and Bart)
2011	The Tonite Show - Thuggin' & Mobbin'	"All on You" (Yukmouth featuring Richie Rich and B-Legit)
2012	No Trespassing	"Hog Ridin'" (Too Short featuring Richie Rich)
2012	The Block Brochure: Welcome to the Soil 1	"Cutlass" (E-40 featuring B-Legit and Richie Rich)
2012	Memoirs of a Curb Server	"Cannabis Club" (Remix) (J. Stalin featuring Berner, Young Do, the Jacka, Stevie Joe, Onionz, Richie Rich and Yukmouth)
2012	Cookies 'n Cream	"Airheads" (Blanco and Yukmouth featuring Dru Down, B-Legit and Richie Rich)
2012	The Conspiracy	"So Good (Remix)" (Philthy Rich and Dem Hoodstarz featuring Richie Rich and Too Short) (Prod.by Jimi Productionz)
