= Funkdafied (song) =

Single by Da Brat

from the album Funkdafied
- Released: May 13, 1994
- Recorded: 1993
- Genre: G-funk
- Length: 3:05
- Label: So So Def Recordings
- Songwriters: Jermaine Dupri; Da Brat; The Isley Brothers; Chris Jasper
- Producer: Jermaine Dupri

Da Brat singles chronology
"Funkdafied" (1994)	"Fa All Y'all" (1995)

Music video
- "Funkdafied" on YouTube

"Funkdafied" is a song by American rapper Da Brat, released in May 1994, by So So Def Recordings, as the lead single from her debut album of the same name (1994). The song was written by Da Brat and Jermaine Dupri and produced by the latter. It contains a sample of the Isley Brothers 1983 hit "Between the Sheets", for which the brothers and Chris Jasper were given songwriting credits. "Funkdafied" also uses the rap from the intro of "Gimme the Funk," the 1982 release by Charades, however the writer of “Gimme the Funk”, Warp 9 producer Lotti Golden doesn’t appear to have been credited. Both songs feature the rap parody in their intros, which satirizes the standard oath taken in sworn testimony, “Do you swear to give me the funk, the whole funk, and nothing but the funk...I do”

== Chart performance ==
The single was released in the summer of 1994 and quickly became a hit, reaching number six on the US Billboard Hot 100 and number two on the R&B charts (held from the top spot by Janet Jackson's "Any Time, Any Place") and number one on Hot Rap Singles. To date, "Funkdafied" remains Da Brat's most successful single and is her only single to have been certified platinum for shipments exceeding one million copies, earning the certification on August 16, 1994. By the end of the year, it had sold 800,000 copies. It reached No. 37 on the Billboard Year-End Hot 100 singles of 1994 as one of the year's most successful singles.

== Critical reception ==
Tony Farsides from the Record Mirror Dance Update wrote, "Yet more juvenile rap to add to the likes of Shyheim, Whooliganza, Illegal, Da Youngsta's etc. This time kiddy rap goes West Coast for a track that shamelessly jumps the Dre/P-Funk bandwagon. Da Brat's rap is pure rat-a-tat-tat Snoop style, while the track itself rides on a bed of the Isley Brothers' 'Between the Sheets'. OK, it's a non-starter on the credibility stakes, but with its Clintonesque chorus this is an irresistible slice of pop rap." Charles Aaron from Spin said, "Best Snoop rip yet, by a bitch, no less (and I mean that in a constructive way, you know). Deftly produced by Kris Kross puppetmaster Jermaine Dupri." In his list of the "Top 20 Singles of the Year" in December 1994, he ranked "Funkdafied" number 16.

== Music video ==
The accompanying music video for "Funkdafied" was directed by David Nelson and premiered in the summer of 1994. At the 1994 Billboard Music Video Awards, it was nominated for Clip of the Year and New Artist Clip of the Year, both in the category for Rap.

== Single track listing ==
1. "Funkdafied"
2. "Funkdafied" (Rated R)
3. "Funkdafied" (Instrumental)
4. "Funkdafied" (A Cappella)

== Charts ==
=== Weekly charts ===
Chart (1994)	Peak position
Canada Retail Singles (The Record)	2
France (SNEP)	42
New Zealand (Recorded Music NZ)	17
Scotland Singles (OCC)	93
UK Singles (OCC)	65
UK Hip Hop/R&B (OCC)	11
UK Club Chart (Music Week)	90
US Billboard Hot 100	6
US Dance Singles Sales (Billboard)	3
US Hot R&B/Hip-Hop Songs (Billboard)	2
US Hot Rap Songs (Billboard)	1
US Rhythmic Airplay (Billboard)	1
US Cash Box Top 100	20

=== Year-end charts ===
Chart (1994)	Position
US Billboard Hot 100	37
US Hot R&B/Hip-Hop Songs (Billboard)	14
US Maxi-Singles Sales (Billboard)	17

== Certifications ==
Region	Certification	Certified units/sales
United States (RIAA)	Platinum	1,000,000^{^}
^{^} Shipments figures based on certification alone.
