= Da Brat =

American rapper (born 1974)

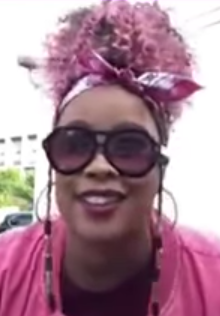
- Da Brat in 2018

Background information
- Born: Shawntae Harris; April 14, 1974 (age 52); Chicago, Illinois, U.S.
- Genre: Midwestern hip-hop
- Occupations: Rapper; songwriter; actress
- Years active: 1992–present
- Labels: So So Def; Virgin
- Spouse: Jesseca Dupart (m. 2022)
- Children: 1
- Relatives: LisaRaye McCoy (half-sister)

Shawntae Harris-Dupart (née Harris; born April 14, 1974), known professionally as Da Brat, is an American rapper. Born and raised in Chicago, Illinois, she began her career in 1992 and signed with Jermaine Dupri's So So Def Recordings two years later to release her debut studio album, Funkdafied (1994). Receiving platinum certification by the Recording Industry Association of America (RIAA), it became the first album by a female hip hop solo act to do so. (Note: The first album by a female hip hop act to do so was Hot, Cool & Vicious (1986) by Salt-N-Pepa—a duo.)

The album was supported by the 1994 lead single of the same name, which peaked at number six on Billboard Hot 100, along with her guest appearance alongside Lisa Lopes, Missy Elliott and Angie Martinez on Lil' Kim's 1997 single "Not Tonight". Furthermore, "Funkdafied" peaked at number two on the Billboard Hot Rap Songs chart, while "Not Tonight" peaked at number three. Her second album, Anuthatantrum (1996) spawned the single "Ghetto Love" (featuring T-Boz), while her third, Unrestricted (2000) peaked at number five on the Billboard 200. During the late 1990s–2000s, she guest performed on Dem Franchize Boyz's single "I Think They Like Me", the remixes of Mariah Carey's "Loverboy", "Always Be My Baby", and "Honey", and the 1999 mashup "I Still Believe/Pure Imagination". With Carey, she released the 2003 duet "Gotta Thing For You", a hip hop-inspired version of the Bobby Caldwell song "What You Won't Do for Love". Harris has received two Grammy Award nominations.

== Early life and education ==
Shawntae Harris was born on April 14, 1974, in Chicago, Illinois, and was raised primarily on the West Side of Chicago. Her father, David Ray McCoy, was a businessman, and her mother, Nadine Brewer, was a city bus driver. Her parents never married, and Harris was subsequently raised in two different households. She lived part-time with her mother, and part with her grandmother, attending an Apostolic church four times a week and singing in the choir. Harris is the paternal half-sister of actress LisaRaye McCoy. Harris attended Kenwood Academy during her sophomore and junior years, where she ran track and played basketball. She graduated from the Academy of Scholastic Achievement, a continuation charter school that caters to at-risk students in 1992.

== Career ==
=== 1992–1995: Early success ===
In 1992, Da Brat's big break occurred when she won the grand prize in a local rap contest sponsored by Yo! MTV Raps. As part of her prize, Brat met the young rap duo Kris Kross and was introduced to their producer, Jermaine Dupri; Brat was eventually signed to his So So Def label, with Dupri remaining a collaborator, friend and fixture throughout the entirety of Brat's career. Her debut album, Funkdafied (1994), entered the Billboard hip hop albums chart at No. 11. The album went platinum, making her the first solo female rapper to exceed one million records sold. The album's lead single, "Funkdafied", reached No. 1 on the Billboard Hot Rap Songs chart and No. 6 on the Billboard Hot 100. Her follow-up single from the album, "Give It 2 You", reached No. 26 on the Hot 100.

The Essence article "Da Brat's Best Fashion Looks" highlights the evolution and impact of Da Brat's unique style throughout her career. It showcases her distinctive fashion choices, blending hip-hop culture with personal flair, making her a fashion icon. The article features her signature looks, such as iconic braids and oversized jerseys, emphasizing how her bold style complements her musical career and influences the fashion industry. Da Brat's fearless approach to fashion has inspired many, solidifying her role in shaping hip-hop fashion and beyond.

=== 1996–1999: Collaborations and film projects ===
In 1996, Da Brat released her second full-length album, Anuthatantrum, which included the single "Ghetto Love" featuring T-Boz of TLC. Over the course of the 1990s, Brat came to be recognized for her comedic timing, her laidback attitude, and her many memorable guest-spots on other artists' songs. She was featured with Kris Kross on the title track of their album Da Bomb (1993), as well as on their third album, Young, Rich and Dangerous (1996). A long-time friend of singer Mariah Carey, Brat contributed a rap verse to the So So Def remix of Carey's No. 1 single "Always Be My Baby" in 1996, which also featured Dupri and fellow So So Def group Xscape. That same year, Brat made her feature film debut in Kazaam (1996), starring Shaquille O'Neal.

The late 1990s saw Da Brat featured in many high-profile collaborations, including her appearance on a remix of Dru Hill's 1997 song "In My Bed". That same year, she and Dupri also appeared on a remix of Mariah Carey's No. 1 single "Honey", entitled "Honey (So So Def mix)"; Brat also recorded a hit remix of "Ladies' Night (Not Tonight)" with Lil' Kim, Lisa "Left-Eye" Lopes (of TLC), Angie Martinez, and Missy Elliott. The quintet gave an Ancient Egypt/Roman-themed performance of the song at the 1997 MTV Video Music Awards. Brat was then featured in "Sock It 2 Me" by Elliott, off of her debut album Supa Dupa Fly (1997), and starred in its accompanying music video. In 1999, she was featured with Krayzie Bone (of Bone Thugs-n-Harmony) on Carey's "I Still Believe (Imagination Remix)", originally by Brenda K. Starr; the remixed version creatively samples the melodies of "Pure Imagination", originally performed by Gene Wilder in Willy Wonka & the Chocolate Factory (1971). That same year, Brat was featured again with Missy Elliott on Mariah Carey's remix of "Heartbreaker" (1999), and starred in the accompanying music video. She also joined Carey for several televised promotional performances, including on The Oprah Winfrey Show. The remix samples the song "Ain't No Fun (If the Homies Can't Have None)" (1993) by Snoop Dogg, who also appears in the music video, and Brat composed her verses loosely based on the original. By the end of 1999, she had also contributed a verse to the remix of Brandy's "U Don't Know Me (Like U Used To)", as well as to a remix of the Destiny's Child hit "Jumpin', Jumpin'".

=== 2000–2003: Return to solo work ===
In early 2000, Da Brat released her third full-length album, Unrestricted, preceded by the single "That's What I'm Looking For" (U.S. no. 56), which was featured on the soundtrack to Big Momma's House (2000). She also released "What'chu Like" (U.S. No. 26), featuring R&B singer Tyrese. The album was not as well-received as Brat's earlier work. However, the record and the new millennium saw an image change for Da Brat, deviating from her "gangsta", tomboy persona, and deciding to follow the "sexy" trend in popular music. The new album featured Da Brat reciting more forward, sexually charged lyrics and wearing more revealing, feminine outfits. In 2001, Brat continued being featured on other artists' songs, reaching No. 1 on the Billboard Hot R&B/Hip Hop Singles chart (along with Cameo and rappers Ludacris and Shawnna) on the remix of Mariah Carey's "Loverboy". The same year, she was featured on Destiny's Child's "Survivor" remix. Da Brat also appeared as friend Louise in Carey's 2001 movie Glitter. In 2003, Brat released her fourth album, titled Limelite, Luv & Niteclubz, including the single "In Love wit Chu" which peaked at No. 9 on the Billboard rhythmic chart. At the same time, she appeared on the fourth season of VH1's The Surreal Life.

=== 2005–present: Current activities ===
In 2005, she made a comeback of sorts when she was featured on the remix of the song "I Think They Like Me", by Dem Franchize Boyz, which also featured Bow Wow and Jermaine Dupri. The song peaked at No. 1 on the Billboard Hot R&B/Hip Hop Singles chart and No. 15 on the Billboard Hot 100. In 2006, she was an onstage guest on Mariah Carey's The Adventures of Mimi Tour in Atlanta, New York City, Long Island, Washington DC, Chicago, and Los Angeles performing her rap verses on the "Heartbreaker" and "Honey" remixes. She was also featured on Kelly Rowland's "Gotsta Go", a bonus track from her 2007 album Ms. Kelly and is also featured on "4real4real", a bonus track from Carey's E=MC². She also co-wrote a song with Carey called "O.O.C." which appears on E=MC² and contributes backing vocals on the track. In 2007, she participated in the fifth season of the VH1 reality series Celebrity Fit Club. In 2011, she did a remix with Kelly Rowland called "Motivation" featuring Lil Wayne. Following her release from prison, she launched a web series about life after the experience titled "Brat Chronicles: In Transition" on YouTube. She released her new single "Is It Chu?" on iTunes and other digital services on July 2, 2013. She now works for the Rickey Smiley Morning show as a co-host (July 2015 – present) and is part of the Dish Nation cast out of Atlanta. Since 2016, Da Brat has appeared on the reality TV series The Rap Game, as a mentor to young talent. In 2017 Da Brat joined the reality TV series Growing up Hip Hop: Atlanta which follows around Atlanta legends and children of Atlanta legends.

== Personal life ==
Da Brat dated Allen Iverson in the late 1990s. In an interview with Variety in March 2020, she discussed coming out as bisexual and why it took her 25 years to do so. On March 26, 2020, Da Brat confirmed that she is in a relationship with hair product businesswoman Jesseca Dupart. On February 22, 2022, Da Brat and Dupart married in Georgia.

Da Brat publicly came out in March 2020 through an Instagram post where she announced her relationship with Jesseca Dupart, CEO of Kaleidoscope Hair Products. In an interview, Da Brat shared that she had always preferred privacy but felt the need to meet in the middle with her partner, who is a social media influencer. The decision to come out was spontaneous, and Da Brat expressed how good it felt to share her happiness with the world.

Da Brat announced in February 2023 that she was expecting her first child. She had surgery to remove fibroids and polyps prior to an embryo transfer procedure and suffered a miscarriage before the current pregnancy. She gave birth to their son, True Legend, on July 6, 2023.

=== Legal troubles and 2008 prison sentence ===
In 2001, Da Brat pleaded guilty to misdemeanor reckless conduct after she had battered a woman with a gun during a dispute over VIP seating in an Atlanta nightclub in 2000. The victim in that incident received six stitches for a head wound. Da Brat ended up serving a year's probation, performed 80 hours of community service, and paid a $1,000 fine.

On October 31, 2007, Da Brat was involved in an altercation that ended in assault at a Halloween party held at Studio 72 nightclub near Atlanta. Da Brat initially argued with a hostess, ex-NFL cheerleader Shayla Stevens, and when the hostess walked away to talk to her manager, Da Brat attacked her from behind, striking her in the face with a rum bottle. The waitress was rushed to an area hospital, and police arrested and jailed Da Brat. In court, Da Brat pleaded guilty to aggravated assault charges. She was sentenced in August 2008 to three years in prison, seven years of probation, and 200 hours of community service. In May 2010, she was temporarily released from prison as part of a work-release program, after serving 21 months. On February 28, 2011, Da Brat was released from prison, according to her boss Jermaine Dupri. Her civil trial stemming from the 2007 altercation commenced on February 24, 2014. On February 28, 2014, a civil trial jury awarded the assault victim $6.4 million to cover her injuries and past/future loss of earnings.

== Discography ==
Studio albums

- Funkdafied (1994)
- Anuthatantrum (1996)
- Unrestricted (2000)
- Limelite, Luv & Niteclubz (2003)

== Tours ==
Joint tour

- Rainbow World Tour (with Mariah Carey and Missy Elliott) (2000)

== Filmography ==
=== Film ===
Year	Title	Role	Notes
1996	Kazaam	Herself	
2001	Carmen: A Hip Hopera	Narrator	TV movie
2001	Glitter	Louise	
2002	Civil Brand	Sabrina	
2006	30 Days	Kamesha	
2018	Canal Street	Herself	
2021	Envy: Seven Deadly Sins	Herself	TV movie

=== Television ===
Year	Title	Role	Notes
1994–1995	All That	Herself	Episode: "Da Brat" & "Larisa Oleynik/Da Brat"
1995–1997	It's Showtime at the Apollo	Herself	Recurring Guest
1996–2003	Soul Train	Herself	Recurring Guest
1997–1998	The Parent 'Hood	Bernice "Boo" Walker	Recurring Cast: Season 4
2000	Making the Video	Herself	Episode: "Da Brat: What'Chu Like"
2000	The Source Hip-Hop Music Awards	Herself/Co-Host	Main Co-Host
2001	The Andy Dick Show	Herself	Episode: "Come Back Quentin"
2002	Weakest Link	Herself	Episode: "Rap Stars"
2002	Sabrina, the Teenage Witch	Baby K2K	Episode: "Shift Happens"
2003	Intimate Portrait	Herself	Episode: "Mariah Carey"
2005	The Surreal Life	Herself	Main Cast: Season 4
2007	Celebrity Rap Superstar	Herself/Judge	Main Judge
2007	Celebrity Fit Club	Herself	Main Cast: Season 5
2008	Hollywood Trials	Herself	Episode: "Episode 1.6"
2012	Unsung	Herself	Episode: "Millie Jackson"
2014–2019	The Real Housewives of Atlanta	Herself	Recurring Cast: Seasons 7 & 10 & 12, Guest: Season 8
2015	Empire	Jezzy	Episode: "Et Tu, Brute?"
2015–2025	Dish Nation	Herself/Co-Host	Main Co-Host: Season 4-13
2017	Hip Hop Squares	Herself	Recurring Guest
2017	Star	Herself	Episode: "A House Divided"
2017–2021	Growing Up Hip Hop: Atlanta	Herself	Recurring Cast: Seasons 1-2a, Main Cast: Seasons 2b-4
2018	Unsung Hollywood	Herself	Episode: "Rickey Smiley"
2021–2024	The Chi	LaPorsha	Guest: Season 4, Recurring Cast: Season 6
2021–2023	Brat Loves Judy	Herself	Main Cast
2022	Celebrity Family Feud	Herself/Contestant	Episode: "Simu Liu vs. Nathan Chen and Monica vs. So So Def"
2022	Step Up: High Water	Herself	Recurring Cast: Season 3
2023	Ladies First: A Story of Women in Hip-Hop	Herself	Episode: "What Are They Up Against?"
2023	Saturdays	Princess	Episode: "Don't Clown the Duchess"
2023–2024	Married to Medicine	Herself	Recurring Cast: Season 10
2024	Love & Hip Hop: Atlanta	Herself	Episode: "Reddy or Not"

=== Music videos ===
Year	Song	Artist
1994	"Da Bomb"	Kris Kross
1995	"One More Chance"	The Notorious B.I.G.
1997	"The Rain (Supa Dupa Fly)"	Missy Elliott
2001	"Ghetto Girls"	Lil' Bow Wow
2005	"Shake It Off"	Mariah Carey

=== Documentary ===
Year	Title
1997	Rhyme & Reason

== Awards and nominations ==
Grammy Awards

Year	Nominated work	Award	Result
1998	"Not Tonight" Remix	Best Rap Performance by a Duo or Group	Nominated
2004	"Got It Poppin'"	Best Female Rap Solo Performance	Nominated

Soul Train Lady of Soul Awards

Year	Nominated work	Award	Result
1995	Funkdafied	Best Rap Album	Won

BET Awards

Year	Nominated work	Award	Result
2001	Da Brat	Best Female Hip-Hop Artist	Nominated
2004	Da Brat	Best Female Hip-Hop Artist	Nominated

Billboard Awards

Year	Nominated work	Award	Result
1994	Da Brat	No. 1 Rap Artist	Won
