= TLC 2016 Tour =

2016 concert tour by TLC

- Tour by TLC
- Promotional poster for the tour's leg in Australia and New Zealand
- Start date: January 8, 2016
- End date: December 10, 2016
- Legs: 6
- No. of shows: 23

TLC concert chronology
- The Main Event (2015); TLC 2016 Tour (2016)

The TLC 2016 Tour was a concert tour of American group TLC. The tour covered the United States, Canada, Japan, Philippines, Australia and New Zealand. The set list of the shows in 2016 included songs from all four studio albums of TLC's career. The tour comes as the duo plan to release a new album - their first in more than 14 years.

== Concert synopsis ==
The tour comes as the duo plan to release a new album - their first in more than 14 years.

"We always look to her in the shows and pay tribute to Lisa when we do " Waterfalls". The energy she had was something we loved about her so much, everyone did. People end up smiling, laughing, crying - it's a whole range of emotions. I feel her spirit."

Watkins said she was looking forward to performing in New Zealand, and TLC were making the trip largely because of the demand from "amazing" fans. "On Twitter they are always hitting me up, saying 'when are you going to come down?"

Both Tionne, "T-Boz" Watkins and Rozonda, "Chilli" Thomas performed together as a duo, while using some samples of Lisa "Left-Eye" Lopes's performances.

== Set list ==
1. "What About Your Friends"
2. "Ain't 2 Proud 2 Beg"
3. "Silly Ho"
4. "Kick Your Game"
5. "Hat 2 Da Back"
6. "Baby-Baby-Baby"
7. "Diggin' on You"
8. "Red Light Special"
9. "Creep"
10. "FanMail"
11. "I'm Good at Being Bad"
12. "Damaged"
13. "Unpretty"
14. "No Scrubs"
15. "Meant To Be"
16. "Waterfalls"

== Tour dates ==
Date	City	Country	Venue
North America
January 8, 2016	Calgary	Canada	Cowboys Nightclub
March 11, 2016	Newark	United States	Prudential Center
May 14, 2016	Atlanta	United States	Central Park
July 9, 2016	Rochester	United States	Rhinos Stadium
July 13, 2016	Richmond	United States	Richmond Pavilion
July 14, 2016	Northfield	United States	Hard Rock Rocksino
July 15, 2016	Detroit	United States	Chene Park
September 9, 2016	Pala	United States	Pala Casino
September 10, 2016	Lincoln	United States	Thunder Valley Casino
September 24, 2016	Toronto	Canada	TD Echo Beach
September 25, 2016	Westbury	United States	NYCB Theatre at Westbury
September 26, 2016	Montclair	United States	Wellmont Theatre
October 8, 2016	Houston	United States	Arena Theatre
October 9, 2016	Dallas	United States	Gas Monkey Live!
Oceania
November 10, 2016	Wellington	New Zealand	Michael Fowler Centre
November 12, 2016	Tauranga	New Zealand	ASB Arena
November 16, 2016	Sydney	Australia	Enmore Theatre
November 18, 2016	Sydney	Australia	Qudos Bank Arena
November 19, 2016	Brisbane	Australia	Eatons Hills
November 20, 2016	Perth	Australia	Nib Stadium
November 22, 2016	Adelaide	Australia	Titanium Security Arena
November 23, 2016	Melbourne	Australia	Palais Theatre
November 26, 2016	Auckland	New Zealand	Vector Arena

Cancellations and rescheduled shows

October 9, 2016	Dallas, Texas	Southside Music Hall	Cancelled due to promoter

== Personnel ==
- TLC – performers
- Benny Demus – DJ
- Mike Williams – keyboards and MIDI
- Leon Kitrell II – drums
- Jamaica Craft – choreographer
- Naeemah McCowan – dancer
- Maasa Ishihara – dancer
- Gabriel Graves – dancer
- Victor Carter – dancer
