= CrazySexyCool =

1994 studio album by TLC

Studio album by TLC
- Released: November 15, 1994
- Recorded: December 1993 – September 1994
- Studios: KrossWire (Atlanta) (Note: Tracks 1, 3, 9, and 15); D.A.R.P. (Atlanta) (Note: Tracks 2, 5, 8, 11, and 13); Music Grinder (Hollywood) (Note: Tracks 4, 7, and 10); The Hit Factory (New York City) (Note: Tracks 6, 12, and 14); Doppler (Atlanta) (Note: Tracks 8 and 16); Bosstown (Atlanta); Daddy's House (New York City) (Note: Track 11); Curtom (Atlanta) (Note: Track 16)
- Genres: R&B; hip-hop soul; pop
- Length: 56:10
- Labels: LaFace; Arista
- Producers: Dallas Austin; Babyface; Sean "Puffy" Combs; Jermaine Dupri; Jon-John; Organized Noize; Chucky Thompson

TLC chronology
Ooooooohhh... On the TLC Tip (1992)	CrazySexyCool (1994)	FanMail (1999)

Singles from CrazySexyCool
- 1. "Creep" Released: October 31, 1994; 2. "Red Light Special" Released: February 17, 1995; 3. "Waterfalls" Released: May 29, 1995; 4. "Diggin' on You" Released: October 10, 1995

CrazySexyCool is the second studio album by American girl group TLC, released on November 15, 1994, by LaFace and Arista Records. Following the group's record deal, they released their debut album Ooooooohhh... On the TLC Tip in 1992 to positive reviews and commercial success. The group began working on a follow-up in 1993 but experienced an unproductive recording process due to personal issues, notably those of member Lisa "Left Eye" Lopes, who was struggling with alcoholism and her volatile relationship with football player Andre Rison. The album's recording lasted until September 1994, with Lopes' role diminished while she was in rehab.

CrazySexyCool saw the group reunite with producers Dallas Austin, Kenneth "Babyface" Edmonds, and Jermaine Dupri, as well as new collaborators Organized Noize and Chucky Thompson. It also featured contributions from Sean "Puffy" Combs, who helped with the notable hip hop soul sound; the album featured hip hop beats, funk, deep grooves, propulsive rhythms, and smooth production. The album's lyrical content was seen as a departure from the group's debut and was seen as a coming-of-age project which explored themes such as sexuality, romanticism, inexperience, and youthful optimism.

CrazySexyCool was met with critical acclaim and commercial success, peaking at number three on the Billboard 200, a chart on which it stayed for over two years. It has been certified 12-times platinum by the Recording Industry Association of America (RIAA), making TLC the first girl group in history to be awarded diamond status. It has since sold over 23 million copies worldwide, becoming the best-selling album by an American girl group. It has also been featured on Rolling Stone magazine's list of The 500 Greatest Albums of All Time, included in the book 1001 Albums You Must Hear Before You Die, and was listed as a "New Classic" by Entertainment Weekly in 2008. The album was ranked at number seven on Billboard's list of the best diamond-certified albums of all time.

== Background ==
=== Debut album ===
On February 28, 1991, Tionne Watkins and Lisa Lopes signed production, management, and publishing deals with Pebbitone, with Perri Reid becoming their general manager. The two-member TLC-Skee made its first recorded appearance on a track for LaFace act Damian Dame's self-titled 1991 LP. Pebbles found the third member in Rozonda Thomas, one of Damian Dame's part-time backup dancers.

Thomas was signed to the act in April 1991, at about which time the group's name was shortened to TLC. To maintain TLC's name as an acronym for the girls' names, Watkins became "T-Boz", Lopes became "Left-Eye", and Thomas became "Chilli." The girls were then signed to LaFace in May through the production deal with Pebbitone; their records would be distributed by Arista Records/BMG. TLC was immediately set up to go into the studio with Reid and Edmonds, Dallas Austin, Jermaine Dupri, and Marley Marl producing their first album, Ooooooohhh... On the TLC Tip. The new trio debuted as backing vocalists on "Rebel (With a Cause)", a track on Jermaine Jackson's sole album for LaFace, You Said (1991).

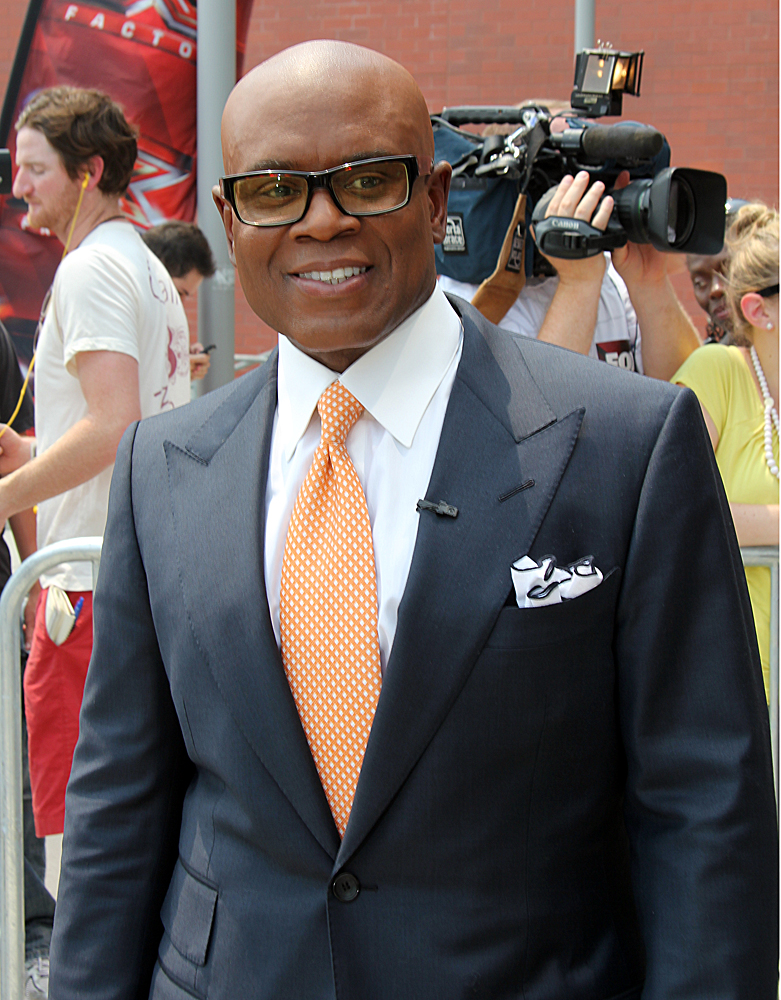
L.A. Reid signed TLC and served as executive producer on both the group's debut and its follow-up, CrazySexyCool

Production on Ooooooohhh... On the TLC Tip wrapped up in December 1991. The album reached number 14 on the US Billboard 200 and number three on the Top R&B/Hip-Hop Albums chart. According to Nielsen SoundScan, it has sold 2.5 million copies in the US. It was eventually certified four-times platinum by the Recording Industry Association of America (RIAA) for shipping four million copies in the US.

=== Personal struggles ===
Lopes was often vocal about her personal life and difficult past. She readily admitted that she had come from an abusive, alcoholic background and struggled with alcohol problems herself. These problems became headline news in 1994, when she set fire to Andre Rison's tennis shoes in a bathtub, which ultimately spread to the mansion they shared, destroying it. Lopes claimed that Rison had beaten her after a night out, and she set fire to his shoes to get back at him. However, she said burning down the house was an accident. Lopes later revealed that she did not have a lot of freedom within the relationship and was abused mentally and physically, having released all her frustrations on the night of the fire. Lopes, who was sentenced to five years probation and therapy at a halfway house, was never able to shake the incident from her reputation. Her relationship with Rison continued to make headlines, with rumors of an imminent wedding, later debunked by People magazine.

== Recording ==
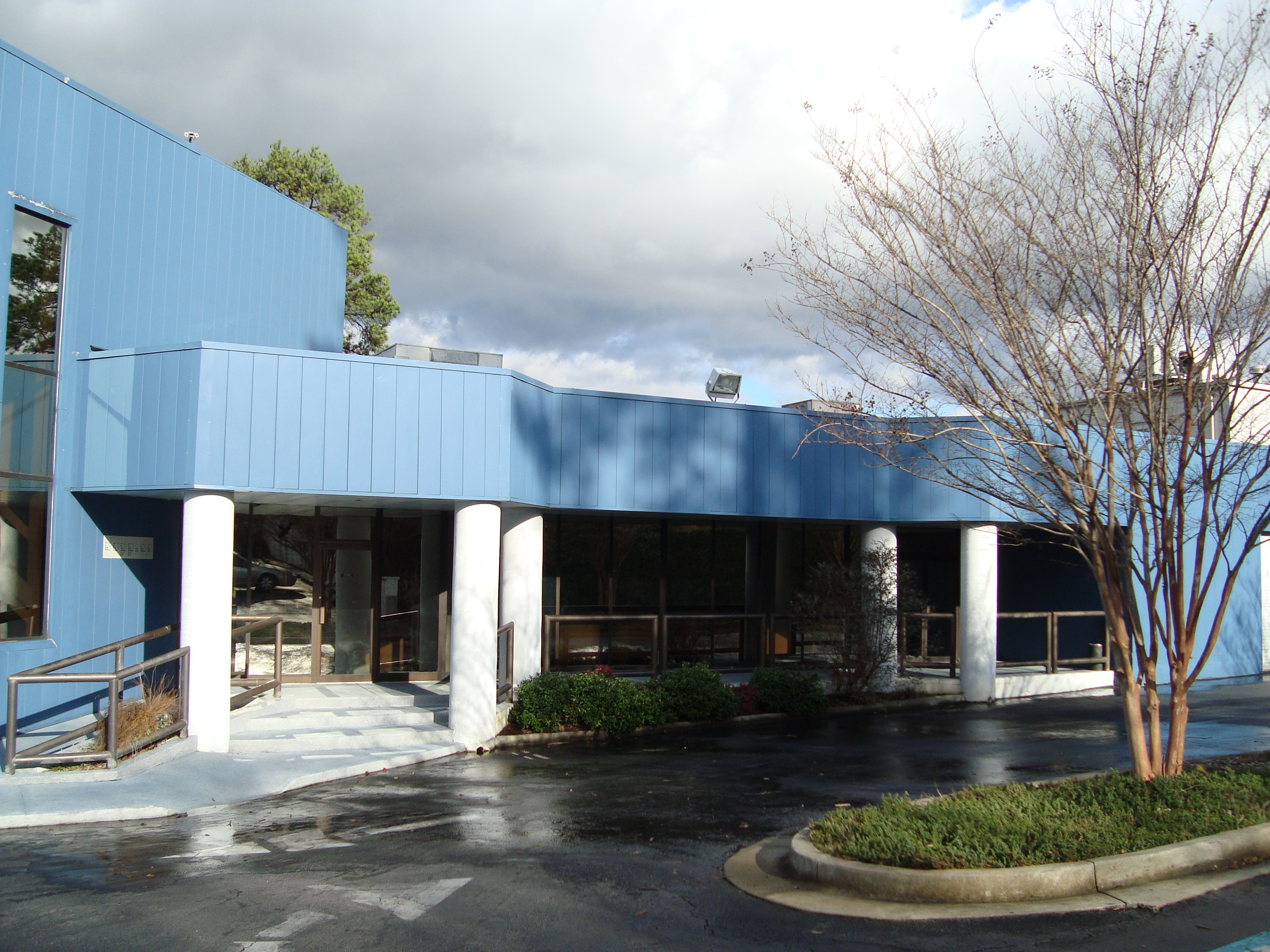
Doppler Studios was one of the recording studios used during the album's production.

The album's recording began in late 1993 and continued through till September 1994. The album was recorded at numerous studios, including Doppler Studios, Bosstown Recording Studios, KrossWire Studio and GADaddy's; D.A.R.P. Studios in Atlanta, Georgia; the Music Grinder Studios in Los Angeles, California; and The Hit Factory in New York City.

During the album's recording, Lopes was forced to have less of an input, as she had pled guilty in an arson accident and was sent to a rehab facility as punishment. The rehab facility only released her for a couple of recording sessions, during which time she cut just a handful of album-worthy rap verses.

For the album's production and writing, the group worked with producers including Babyface, Dallas Austin, Jermaine Dupri and more. Thomas stated that they had used these producers because they always worked with them stating that they worked with Dallas, Babyface, and Dupri on the first album "the only thing we had new was Organized Noize." Phife Dawg from A Tribe Called Quest did the interludes. However, during the album's recording, the band members were not always in the studio together; sometimes they went in one by one due to scheduling conflicts.

"Waterfalls" was written by Lopes with Marqueze Etheridge and Organized Noize, who also produced the song. Watkins and Thomas perform the song with Lopes, who also provides a rap. The background vocals are performed by the members of TLC, as well as Debra Killings and Cee-Lo Green. Speaking of Green's involvement, Watkins said, "He was in Goodie Mob, we grew up together, we go way back. He did and it was amazing! I love his voice." The lyrics of the song reference 1990s issues such as violence associated with illegal drug trade and the HIV/AIDS epidemic. At the end of the second verse, Watkins sings, "His health is fading and he doesn't know why / Three letters took him to his final resting place." She said that it was important for the group to "get the message across without seeming like preaching."

== Music and lyrics ==
CrazySexyCool was a rebellious and free from the traditional R&B norms that weighed the genre down. That edginess, that swagger can't be replaced without its ties to hip-hop. There's something to be said for how fresh and balanced it sounded, how different it was, and how little it seemed to care about observing R&B convention. To me, that was half the appeal: It was sensual R&B with fiery hip-hop spirit.

— Sheldon Pearce, Consequence of Sound

CrazySexyCool was noted as a departure from the group's debut, and was seen as move away from the group's predominantly rap connections. The songs on the album contained sensual R&B sounds built over edgy hip-hop beats; containing propulsive rhythms along with clap-commanding high production, bouncy funk elements and smooth rhythms.

The album's lyrical content was also seen as a departure from Ooooooohhh... On the TLC Tip. A reviewer from Entertainment Weekly stated that compared to the lyrical content of their debut, which was seen as "kiddie-cute hip-hop", CrazySexyCool is filled with adult-female sexuality, and "hide- and-seek coyness." It was seen as a coming-of-age sophomore album, according to Sheldon Pearce from Consequence of Sound, who stated the album had themes of "guileless and horny twenty something" lyrics that harmlessly explored sexuality and romanticism with the "naïveté that comes from inexperience and youthful optimism." The album lyrics also touch upon themes of relationships from both the impassioned and erotic sides.

== Release and promotion ==
To promote CrazySexyCool, TLC—along with Boyz II Men, Montell Jordan, and Mary J. Blige—performed in the annual Budweiser Superfest Tour in early 1995, consisting of 23 dates in North America. The Atlanta, Chicago and Indianapolis shows featured an expanded roster of performers, including Blackstreet and Monica.

All four singles from the album reached the top five of the Billboard Hot 100, two of them reaching number one.

Lead single, "Creep", topped the Billboard Hot 100 for four weeks, and was one of the biggest singles of 1995, coming in at number three in Billboard Year-End Hot 100 Singles of 1995. It also reached number one on the Hot R&B/Hip-Hop Songs chart.

The second single, "Red Light Special", peaked at number two on the Billboard Hot 100, and number three on the Hot R&B/Hip-Hop Songs chart.

The third single, "Waterfalls", became TLC's most successful song, spending seven weeks at number one. It was also the second-biggest single of 1995 according to Billboard, earning TLC two songs in the top three of the 1995 Billboard year-end chart. Internationally, the song reached the top five in several countries.

"Diggin' on You" was released as the album's fourth and final single, and reached number five on the Billboard Hot 100. It also reached number seven on the Hot R&B/Hip-Hop Songs chart.

== Critical reception ==
Professional ratings
Review scores
Source	Rating
AllMusic	5/5 stars
Chicago Tribune	3/4 stars
Christgau's Consumer Guide	B+
The Encyclopedia of Popular Music	4/5 stars
Entertainment Weekly	B+
The Guardian	4/5 stars
Los Angeles Times	2/4 stars
Pitchfork	9.3/10
The Rolling Stone Album Guide	3.5/5 stars

CrazySexyCool was met with critical acclaim. In his review for AllMusic, Stephen Thomas Erlewine described the album as a "smooth, seductive collection of contemporary soul reminiscent of both Philly soul and Prince", adding that the material was "consistently strong". Erlewine continued to write that the album is "powered" by new jack swing and hip-hop beats with influences of mid-tempo funk, deep grooves, horns and guitar lines. He also referred to "Waterfalls" as "one of the classic R&B songs of the '90s".

In Rolling Stone's review for "The 500 Greatest Albums of All Time", the article stated that TLC "emerged with the most effervescent and soulful girl-group R&B anyone had seen since the Supremes."

In 2010, Rolling Stone listed the album at number 43 on their "100 Greatest Albums of the 90s". They stated: "Left Eye, Chilli and T-Boz looked like a one-shot when they first emerged from the nascent Atlanta with 1992's Ain't 2 Proud 2 Beg. But CrazySexyCool was a real shocker, packed bumper to bumper with great songs, sassy vocals and voluptuous beats for burning down the house. 'Creep' celebrates the kicks of illicit lust on the down low, 'Waterfalls' digs deep into Memphis soul and 'If I Was Your Girlfriend' does Prince better than The Artist has all decade. The showstopper: 'Red Light Special', an impossibly steamy make-out ballad that undresses and caresses everyone with ears to hear it. CrazySexyCool established TLC as pop pros who could do it all, combining the body slam of hip-hop and the giddy uplift of a jump-rope rhyme without breaking a nail."

In a 2015 article for Consequence of Sound, music critics Michael Madden and Sheldon Pearce write about how the album has impacted artists well into today's era whose R&B sound has been heavily influenced by strong hip-hop elements. "There should probably be more talk of TLC's role in forging the current R&B landscape, which is heavily, if not entirely, influenced by hip-hop culture now. The two genres have seemingly been grafted onto one another, and there's something of a codependent relationship between the two. To that effect, there's something to be said for that dynamic existing here, too, how the album's sequencing contributes to the music's effectiveness and how it still translates to the modern day."

== Commercial performance ==
CrazySexyCool debuted at number 15 on the US Billboard 200, selling 77,500 copies in its first week. On the issue dated July 29, 1995, the album peaked at number three with 117,000 units sold. The album was certified 12-times platinum by the Recording Industry Association of America (RIAA) on October 11, 2019, and as of July 2017, it had sold 7.7 million copies in the United States, becoming the best-selling album by a female group in the country; it had sold an additional 1.27 million copies through the BMG Music Club as of February 2003. Internationally, it reached number one in New Zealand, as well as the top five in Australia, Germany, the Netherlands, and the United Kingdom. As of July 2006, CrazySexyCool had sold over 23 million copies worldwide.

== Accolades ==
CrazySexyCool was nominated for six Grammy Awards at the 1996 Grammy Awards. "Waterfalls" was nominated for the Record of the Year. Two of the album's nominations were for its songwriters: Dallas Austin for "Creep", and Babyface for "Red Light Special". TLC ended up winning two awards, Best R&B Album and Best R&B Performance by a Duo or Group with Vocals for "Creep".

TLC also received multiple wins and nominations at the Billboard Music Awards, American Music Awards and Soul Train Music Awards, including Artist of the Year at the 1995 Billboard Music Awards. At the 1995 MTV Video Music Awards, TLC won four awards for the video to "Waterfalls", including Video of the Year and the Viewer's Choice Award.

Accolades for CrazySexyCool
Organization	Country	Accolade	Year	Rank	Ref.
Billboard	United States	All 92 Diamond-Certified Albums Ranked from Worst to Best: Critic's Take	2016	7	
Complex	United States	The Best R&B Albums of '90s	2017	4	
Entertainment Weekly	United States	The 100 Best Albums from 1983 to 2008	2008	36	
The Face	United Kingdom	The Face Recordings of the Year	1999	27	
NPR	United States	The 150 Greatest Albums Made by Women	2017	26	
Q	United Kingdom	Q Readers Greatest Albums Ever	2003	77	
Rock and Roll Hall of Fame	United States	The Definitive 200: Top 200 Albums of All-Time	2007	105	
Rolling Stone	United States	The 500 Greatest Albums of All Time	2003	377	
Rolling Stone	United States	The 500 Greatest Albums of All Time	2012	379	
Rolling Stone	United States	The 500 Greatest Albums of All Time	2020	218	
Vibe	United States	The 150 Albums That Define the Vibe Era	2007	Unranked	

== Celebration of CrazySexyCool ==
CeleBraTion of CrazySexyCool
- Tour by TLC
- Location: North America
- Associated album: CrazySexyCool
- Start date: September 3, 2021
- End date: October 10, 2021
- Legs: 1
- No. of shows: 18
- Supporting act: Bone Thugs-N-Harmony

TLC concert chronology
- Whole Lotta Hits Tour (2019); Celebration of CrazySexyCool (2021)

Celebration of CrazySexyCool is a concert tour of American group TLC. This tour, serving as a celebration of the first album by a girl group to reach Diamond status, comes 27 years after the album release. Consisting of 18 dates across the United States, this tour celebrates what Chilli describes as "the album that really put [TLC] on the map", as the group perform selected songs from the 1994 album, as well as other hits.

=== Set list ===
This set list is from the September 14, 2021 concert in Sterling Heights. It is not intended to represent all concerts for the tour.

1. "Creep"
2. "Hat 2 da Back"
3. "Kick Your Game"
4. "Girl Talk"
5. "Case of the Fake People"
6. "Ain't 2 Proud 2 Beg"
7. "What About Your Friends"
8. "Silly Ho"
9. "FanMail"
10. "Way Back"
11. "American Gold"
12. "Sumthin' Wicked This Way Comes"
13. "Unpretty"
14. "Take Our Time"
15. "Red Light Special"
16. "Diggin' on You"
17. "Baby-Baby-Baby"
18. "No Scrubs"
19. "Waterfalls"

== Track listing ==
CrazySexyCool track listing
No.	Title	Writer(s)	Producer(s)	Length
1.	"Intro-lude" (featuring Phife)	Jermaine Dupri; Malike Taylor	Dupri	1:03
2.	"Creep"	Dallas Austin	Austin	4:28
3.	"Kick Your Game"	Dupri; Manuel Seal; Lisa Lopes	Dupri; Seal^{[a]}	4:14
4.	"Diggin' on You"	Kenneth Edmonds	Babyface	4:14
5.	"Case of the Fake People"	Austin	Austin	4:04
6.	"CrazySexyCool – Interlude"	Tionne Watkins; Sean Combs; Carl Thompson	Chucky Thompson; Combs	1:42
7.	"Red Light Special"	Edmonds	Babyface	5:03
8.	"Waterfalls"	Marqueze Etheridge; Lopes; Rico Wade; Patrick Brown; Raymond Murray	Organized Noize	4:39
9.	"Intermission-lude"	Dupri	Dupri	0:42
10.	"Let's Do It Again"	Edmonds; Jon-John Robinson	Babyface; Jon-John	4:16
11.	"If I Was Your Girlfriend"	Prince Nelson	Combs; Thompson; Austin^{[a]}	4:36
12.	"Sexy – Interlude"	Rozonda Thomas; Combs	Thompson; Combs	1:34
13.	"Take Our Time"	Arnold Hennings; Debra Killings	Austin; Hennings	4:34
14.	"Can I Get a Witness – Interlude" (featuring Busta Rhymes)	Trevor Smith Jr.; Combs; Thompson	Thompson; Combs	2:57
15.	"Switch"	Dupri; Seal; Lopes	Dupri; Seal^{[a]}	3:30
16.	"Sumthin' Wicked This Way Comes" (featuring Dre of Outkast)	Wade; Brown; Murray; Etheridge; Lopes; André Benjamin	Organized Noize	4:28
Total length:				56:10

Limited edition CrazySexyCoolBonus disc
No.	Title	Length
1.	"Creep" (Super Smooth mix)	4:43
2.	"Red Light Special" (L.A.'s Flava mix)	4:27
3.	"Waterfalls" (ONP remix)	4:33
4.	"My Secret Enemy" ("Red Light Special" single B-side)	5:35

=== Notes ===
- ^{^[a]} signifies a co-producer
- The single vinyl LP edition omits "Case of the Fake People" and "Intermission-lude".

=== Sample credits ===
- "Creep" contains a sample of "Hey Young World" by Slick Rick.
- "Switch" contains a sample of "Mr. Big Stuff" by Jean Knight.

== Personnel ==
Credits adapted from the liner notes of CrazySexyCool.

=== Musicians ===
- Phife – guest appearance (track 1)
- Dallas Austin – instruments (track 2); keyboards, drums (track 5); additional keyboards (track 11)
- Sol Messiah – scratching (tracks 2, 5)
- Rick Sheppard – MIDI, sound design (tracks 2, 5, 11)
- Debra Killings – background vocals (tracks 2, 4, 5, 7, 8, 11, 13, 16)
- Jermaine Dupri – additional vocals (track 3)
- LaMarquis "Marq" Jefferson – bass (tracks 3, 8)
- Babyface – synthesizers, drum programming (tracks 4, 7, 10)
- T-Boz – background vocals (tracks 4, 7, 10)
- Chilli – background vocals (tracks 4, 7, 10)
- Bebé – background vocals (tracks 4, 7, 10)
- Chucky Thompson – all instruments (tracks 6, 12, 14); keyboards, bass, drums (track 11)
- Sean "Puffy" Combs – ad-libs (track 6)
- Dwight Sills – guitar (track 7)
- Organized Noize – drum programming (tracks 8, 16); keyboards (track 8); keyboard programming (track 16)
- Kenneth Wright – Wurlitzer keyboards (track 8)
- Jerry Lloyd – horns (track 8)
- Ronnie Fitch – horns (track 8)
- Charles Nix – horns (track 8)
- Shock – horn arrangements (track 8)
- Edward Stroud – guitar (track 8)
- TLC – background vocals (track 8)
- Thomas "Cee-Lo" Burton – background vocals (tracks 8, 16)
- Jon-John – synthesizers, drum programming (track 10)
- Colin Wolfe – additional bass (track 11)
- Arnold Hennings – keyboards, drums (track 13)
- Tim Kelley – keyboards (track 13)
- Shorty B – guitar (track 13)
- Mike Patterson – MIDI, sound design (track 13)
- Busta Rhymes – guest appearance (track 14)
- Lisa "Left Eye" Lopes – ad-libs (track 14)
- Trey Lorenz – background vocals (track 15)
- Dre of Outkast – guest appearance (track 16)
- Sir Dean Gant – keyboards (track 16)
- Craig Love – guitar (track 16)
- Martin Terry – guitar (track 16)
- Carlos Glover – bass (track 16)

=== Technical ===
- Jermaine Dupri – recording (tracks 1, 9); mixing (tracks 1, 3, 9, 15); production (tracks 3, 15); remix (track 3)
- John Frye – recording assistance (tracks 1, 3, 9); mixing assistance (track 8)
- Phil Tan – mixing (tracks 1, 3, 9, 15); recording (tracks 3, 15)
- Dallas Austin – production (tracks 2, 5, 13); co-production (track 11); executive production
- Alvin Speights – recording (tracks 2, 5); mixing (tracks 2, 5, 11)
- Leslie Brathwaite – recording (tracks 2, 5); mixing (track 13)
- Carl Glover – recording assistance (tracks 2, 5)
- Brian Smith – recording assistance (tracks 2, 5, 13)
- Manuel Seal – co-production (tracks 3, 15)
- Brian Frye – recording assistance (tracks 3, 15)
- Babyface – production (tracks 4, 7, 10); executive production
- Brad Gilderman – recording (tracks 4, 7, 10)
- Eric Fischer – recording assistance (tracks 4, 7, 10)
- Lamont Hyde – recording assistance (tracks 4, 7, 10)
- Dave Way – mixing (tracks 4, 7, 10)
- Chucky Thompson – production (tracks 6, 11, 12, 14)
- Sean "Puffy" Combs – production (tracks 6, 11, 12, 14)
- Rich Travali – recording, mixing (tracks 6, 12, 14)
- Organized Noize – production (tracks 8, 16)
- Nealhpogue – recording (track 8); mixing (tracks 8, 16)
- Bernasky – recording assistance (track 8); mixing assistance (track 16)
- Rico Lumpkins – recording assistance, mixing assistance (track 8)
- Mike Wilson – recording assistance (track 8)
- Jon-John – production (track 10)
- Nash – recording (track 11)
- Arnold Hennings – production (track 13)
- Mike Patterson – recording (track 13)
- Scott Little – recording assistance (track 13)
- Ron Gresham – mixing (track 13)
- NHP Sound, Inc. – recording (track 16)
- Carlos Glover – recording (track 16)
- Blake Eiseman – recording (track 16)
- Alex Lowe – recording assistance (track 16)
- Herb Powers Jr. – mastering
- Antonio M. Reid – executive production
- Sharliss Asbury – project coordination
- Ivy Skoff – project coordination (tracks 4, 7, 10)

=== Artwork ===
- Davett Singletary – creative direction
- Christopher Stern – art direction
- Dah Len – photography

== Charts ==
=== Weekly charts ===
Weekly chart performance for CrazySexyCool
Chart (1994–1996)	Peak position
Australian Albums (ARIA)	5
Austrian Albums (Ö3 Austria)	16
Belgian Albums (Ultratop Flanders)	20
Belgian Albums (Ultratop Wallonia)	25
Canada Top Albums/CDs (RPM)	6
Dutch Albums (Album Top 100)	4
European Albums (Music & Media)	6
Finnish Albums (Suomen virallinen lista)	37
French Albums (IFOP)	40
German Albums (Offizielle Top 100)	4
New Zealand Albums (RMNZ)	1
Norwegian Albums (VG-lista)	15
Scottish Albums (Official Charts)	24
Swedish Albums (Sverigetopplistan)	11
Swiss Albums (Schweizer Hitparade)	10
UK Albums (Official Charts)	4
UK R&B Albums (Official Charts)	1
US Billboard 200	3
US Top R&B/Hip-Hop Albums (Billboard)	2

=== Year-end charts ===
1995 year-end chart performance for CrazySexyCool
Chart (1995)	Position
Australian Albums (ARIA)	59
Belgian Albums (Ultratop Flanders)	98
Canada Top Albums/CDs (RPM)	10
Dutch Albums (Album Top 100)	38
European Albums (Music & Media)	49
German Albums (Offizielle Top 100)	27
New Zealand Albums (RMNZ)	18
Swedish Albums & Compilations (Sverigetopplistan)	65
Swiss Albums (Schweizer Hitparade)	49
UK Albums (OCC)	33
US Billboard 200	5
US Top R&B/Hip-Hop Albums (Billboard)	2

1996 year-end chart performance for CrazySexyCool
Chart (1996)	Position
Australian Albums (ARIA)	31
Dutch Albums (Album Top 100)	85
UK Albums (OCC)	93
US Billboard 200	22
US Top R&B/Hip-Hop Albums (Billboard)	51

=== Decade-end charts ===
Decade-end chart performance for CrazySexyCool
Chart (1990–1999)	Position
US Billboard 200	25

=== All-time charts ===
All-time chart performance for CrazySexyCool
Chart	Position
US Billboard 200	126
US Billboard 200 (Women)	35

== Certifications and sales ==
Certifications and sales for CrazySexyCool
Region	Certification	Certified units/sales
Australia (ARIA)	2× Platinum	140,000^{^}
Austria (IFPI Austria)	Gold	25,000^{*}
Canada (Music Canada)	8× Platinum	800,000^{^}
Japan (RIAJ)	2× Platinum	400,000^{^}
Netherlands (NVPI)	Gold	50,000^{^}
New Zealand (RMNZ)	Platinum	15,000^{^}
United Kingdom (BPI)	Platinum	300,000^{^}
United States (RIAA)	12× Platinum	8,970,000 (Note: As of July 2017, CrazySexyCool had sold 7.7 million copies in the United States according to Nielsen SoundScan, with an additional 1.27 million sold at BMG Music Club. Nielsen SoundScan does not count albums sold through clubs like the BMG Music Service, which were significantly popular in the 1990s.)
Summaries
Europe (IFPI)	Platinum	1,000,000^{*}
Worldwide	—	23,000,000
^{*} Sales figures based on certification alone.^{^} Shipments figures based on certification alone.

== See also ==
- List of best-selling albums by women
- List of best-selling albums in the United States
