= Kick Your Game =

Promotional single by TLC

from the album CrazySexyCool
- Released: August 26, 1995
- Recorded: Late 1993 – September 1994; KrossWire Studio (Atlanta, Georgia)
- Genre: Dance; R&B
- Length: 4:13
- Label: LaFace; Arista
- Songwriters: Jermaine Dupri; Manuel Seal; Lisa "Left Eye" Lopes
- Producers: Jermaine Dupri; Manuel Seal

"Kick Your Game" is a song recorded by the American group TLC for their second studio album, CrazySexyCool (1994). The "funky" R&B-dance track was written by frequent group collaborator Jermaine Dupri, Manuel Seal and member Lisa "Left Eye" Lopes. On August 26, 1995 it was picked by LaFace and Arista Records for release as a promotional airplay single from the album. In the song's lyrics, TLC teaches boys who flirt in a club "the proper way to approach a lady"; Lopes' rap verses reportedly referred to then-boyfriend Andre Rison, whose house she burned down during the making of CrazySexyCool.

The song peaked at number 69 on the US Billboard Hip-Hop Airplay chart, and received lukewarm reviews from music critics; some called the song an album highlight and praised Lopes' performance. TLC performed "Kick Your Game" on several tours and television appearances, notably the 1995 MTV Video Music Awards and the 1996 Soul Train Music Awards.

== Background and development ==
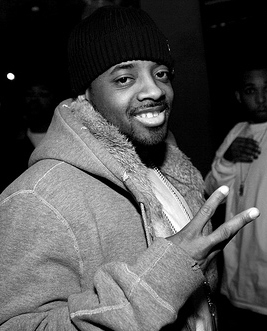
Jermaine Dupri said in 2016 that he was still proud of "Kick Your Game".

After releasing the successful debut album Ooooooohhh... On the TLC Tip in 1992, TLC worked on CrazySexyCool from late 1993 to September 1994. Songwriter-producer Jermaine Dupri was one of the album's contributors. Dupri had created Tionne "T-Boz" Watkins' signature "husky" vocals and helped TLC obtain a contract with LaFace Records, contributing to their initial success.

For CrazySexyCool, Dupri and musical partner Manuel Seal wrote and produced two interludes with "Switch" and "Kick Your Game"; the latter song had additional lyrics by TLC member Lisa "Left Eye" Lopes. The group recorded "Kick Your Game" at KrossWire Studio in their hometown, Atlanta. In 2016, 22 years after the album was recorded, Dupri called it one of the songs of which he was proudest: "the sound, the lyrics, the vibe, everything."

== Composition ==
"Kick Your Game"
The first verse of Lisa "Left Eye" Lopes' rap, followed by a hook performed by Tionne "T-Boz" Watkins and Rozonda "Chilli" Thomas

"Kick Your Game" is a "funky", "bouncy", "smooth", "finger-snapping" R&B-dance song with a "squishy" bass riff, a sound said by Billboard's Kenneth Partridge to "prime the room for grinding." According to Terri Sutton of Spin, the track belonged to the "cool" side of CrazySexyCool. With "Creep", the song's lyrics again demonstrated TLC's "traditional breed" of gender-role reversals. Vibe called it "an ode to dudes who holler in the club", teaching them "the proper way to approach a lady." Kenneth Partridge reminded Billboard readers, "If you wanted to get with TLC in '94, you had to bring your A-game. [Watkins] and [Thomas] break it down for the fellas: Say something clever, get a little action."

The track is one of four on CrazySexyCool to which Lopes contributed rap verses. The rapper was usually absent from the album's recording because she had checked herself into rehab for alcohol abuse, which played a part in her arson charge for burning down her boyfriend Andre Rison's mansion in June 1994. The rehab facility released Lopes for two recording sessions, preventing her from having more input on the album. Two other members of the group performed lead vocals, backed by Dupri's ad-libs on the track. "Preezy" posted on the hip-hop website The Boombox, "Purring 'I been watching you watching me and I know you want it' on the hook, each lady has their own intentions of getting scooped up by the guy they have their respective eyes on — if his game is tight, of course ... 'I just wanna know if you can kick some game, come with something more clever than just your name'". Lopes wrote two rap verses for "Kick Your Game", reenacting a dialogue between herself and someone who was trying to flirt but did not "pass the cleverness test." Darren Levin of the Australian digital music magazine FasterLouder analyzed the song:

This song is set in the dating scene, where the scrutiny is so intense that voices and even personalities have become mixed up. [Watkins] narrates the story, but when Lopes seamlessly picks up the verse, the situation is complicated. Lopes gives off her usual bravado, yet she also sweet-talks herself using another persona. She appears to be mouthing the responses for both herself and an admirer, but it's hard to tell, since the change between characters is done without a break. Throughout the track, the singers use the same tone for different speakers – whether they're playing at being flirts, nagging partners or wise-ass suitors ("I'm just a nigga [sic] that followed you to the coat rack").

Sally-Anne Hurley of TheMusic.com.au suggested that the rapper's lyrics may have been autobiographical; she and "Preezy" cited "Miss Left-Eye / All I wanna do is kiss your hand / Let you know I'm not just another fan / I am the man" and "Baby come with me, you'll be mine so we can make love on the 50-yard line" as possible references to Rison. Hurley also found "something quite character-like about Lopes’ rapping" in "Kick Your Game" and "Switch". Slant Magazine editor Sal Cinquemani called Lopes' rap style in the song her "best impression of Snoop Dogg."

== Release and media use ==
In August 1995, LaFace and Arista Records submitted the track for airplay as a promotional single for CrazySexyCool. It debuted at number 71 on the Billboard Hip-Hop Airplay for the week of August 26, and peaked at number 69 on September 23 and 30. The song remained on the chart for seven weeks, dropping off after November 25. Dupri collaborated with rapper Craig Mack on "Kick Your Game"'s "So So Def" remix for LaFace's promotional compilation album, Rhythm of Black Lifestyle (1995). Another version of the remix, with Dupri protégés Kris Kross, was unreleased; a 30-second snippet was posted on the producer's website. "Kick Your Game" appeared on many TLC compilations, including the group's greatest hits albums Now & Forever: The Hits (2003) and 20 (2013). The song was used in the 2013 VH1 biopic CrazySexyCool: The TLC Story and "The Bryce Newman Letter", an episode of Showtime's 2016 series Roadies. The Roadies episode was set in Atlanta, TLC's hometown.

== Critical reception ==
Craig Jenkins of Complex wrote in his review of CrazySexyCool, "[The album's] sex jams were delicate where they'd once been heavy-handed, but deep cuts like 'Kick Your Game' and 'Case of the Fake People' pulsed with a coolly over-it world weariness." On The Boombox, "Preezy" chose "Kick Your Game" as the album's fourth-best track, praising TLC for giving listeners "a dose of their ATL swag" and "hitting another one out of the park with [the] jam." Looking back at the trio's catalog for PopMatters, Quentin B. Huff was lukewarm about the "wildly"-popular CrazySexyCool and only listened to three tracks: "Creep", "Waterfalls" and "Kick Your Game". Sally-Anne Hurley of TheMusic.com.au called Lopes' performance in the song one of the rapper's "most underrated" for TLC. However, Sal Cinquemani of Slant Magazine wrote that "Kick Your Game" should have been replaced on the 20 greatest-hits album with TLC's 1993 cover of The Time's "Get It Up".

A FasterLouder reviewer called the track "dazzling", but "when Lopes' confidence is unsettled, the challenge seems to come from within her own imagination." Michael A. Gonzales wrote for Ebony that both of Dupri's "jeep bounce" tracks on the album (including "Kick Your Game") sounded like "senior prom jams." Agreeing with Gonzales, Consequence of Sound's Sheldon Pearce wrote that the album would have been more successful if it sounded more like "Waterfalls" and less like "Kick Your Game". Also for Consequence of Sound, Michael Madden praised the song's placement on the album (next to "Diggin' on You") as "a perfect segue conceptually" despite being on "separate ends of the spectrum sonically." According to Camille Augustin of Vibe, "Kick Your Game" might have inspired Blaque's 1999 single "Bring It All to Me"; both were "catcalls to fellas with more than just pickup lines."

== Live performances ==
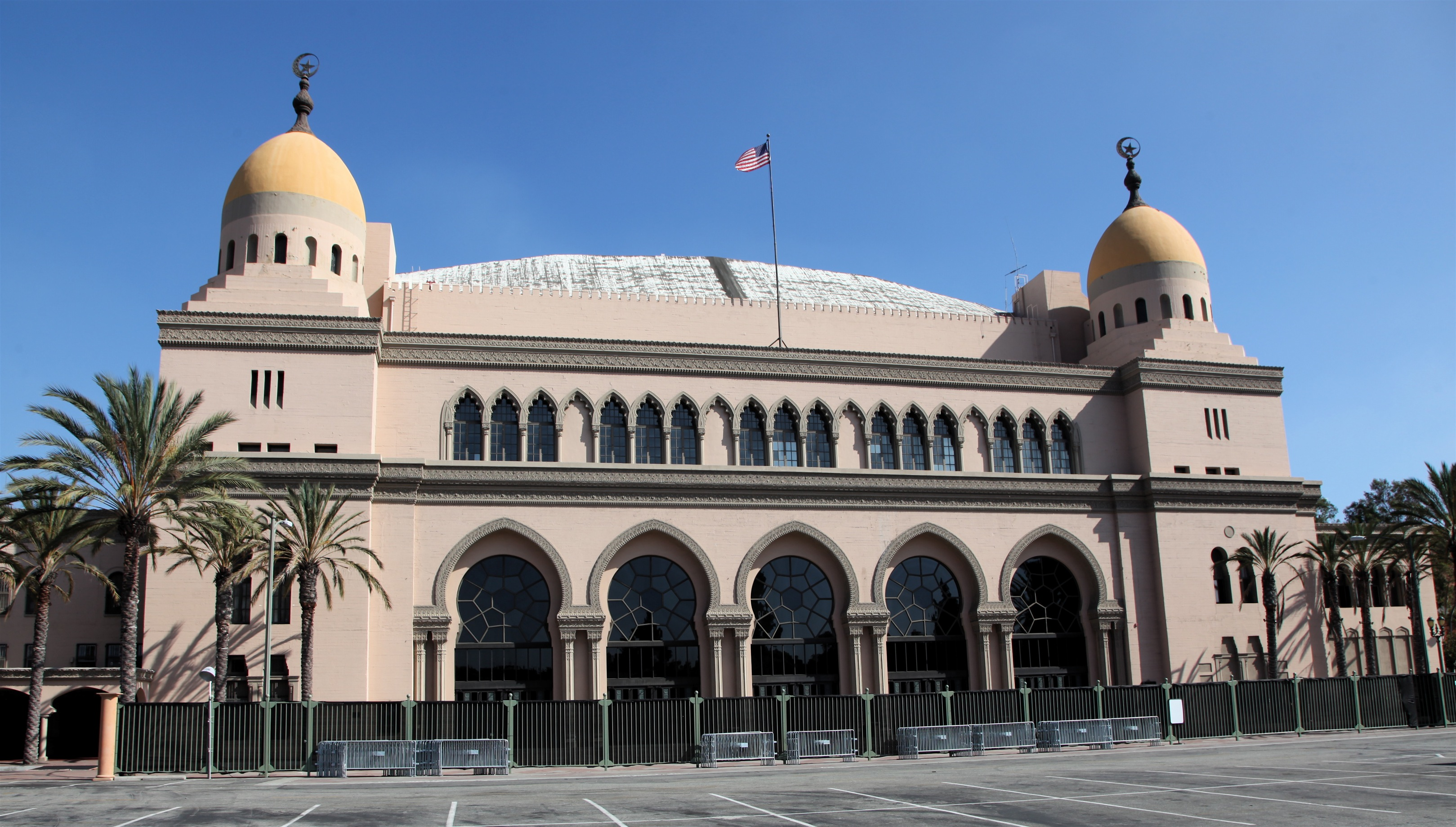
TLC performed "Kick Your Game" with Dupri and rapper Craig Mack during the 1996 Soul Train Music Awards at the Shrine Auditorium in Los Angeles.

TLC joined the 16th Annual Budweiser Superfest Tour in July 1995, with "Kick Your Game" on their tracklist. They performed the song in front of "CrazySexyCool" in cropped t-shirts and oversized jeans held up by thick belts. The trio sang "CrazySexyMedley" ("Ain't 2 Proud 2 Beg", "Kick Your Game", "Creep" and "Waterfalls") at the 1995 MTV Video Music Awards at Radio City Music Hall in New York City on September 7. Edwin Ortiz of Complex called it one of the awards' all-time top twenty, and Fuse listed it as one of their ten favorite least-talked-about performances on the show. According to Ortiz, "Back in the '90s, no female R&B act could touch TLC." The trio performed "Kick Your Game" with Mack and Dupri during the 1996 Soul Train Music Awards at the Shrine Auditorium in Los Angeles on March 29. TLC performed the track at the VH1 Super Bowl Blitz concert at New York's Beacon Theatre on January 30, 2014 in orange jumpsuits, with their backup dancers wearing "paint-splattered" costumes. The performance was for the theatre audience only, during the show's televised commercial break. TLC performed "Kick Your Game" on their promotional tour for 20 in 2014 and their 2016 tour.

== Credits and personnel ==
Credits adapted from CrazySexyCool's liner notes.

Recording and management

- Recorded at KrossWire Studio (Atlanta, Georgia)
- Mixed at Studio LaCoCo (Atlanta, Georgia)
- Published by So So Def, EMI April Music Inc./Full Keel, Air Control Music/TizBiz Music, Pebbitone Music (ASCAP)

Personnel

- Jermaine Dupri – composition, production, mixing, remixing, additional vocals
- Manuel Seal – composition, co-production
- Lisa "Left Eye" Lopes – writing
- Phil Tan – record engineering, mixing
- Brian Frye – recording engineering assistance
- John Frye – record engineering assistance
- LaMarquis "Marq" Jefferson – bass

== Charts ==
Chart (1995)	Peak position
US Billboard Hip-Hop Airplay	69
