= TLC (album) =

2017 studio album by TLC

Studio album by TLC
- Released: June 30, 2017
- Recorded: 2015–2017
- Studios: Halpern (Atlanta, Georgia)
- Genre: R&B
- Length: 41:05
- Label: 852 Musiq
- Producers: Michael Busbee; Casper & B.; D'Mile; Dunlap Exclusive; Ron Fair; Knotch; Cory Mo; NoizeBeatz; Desmond Peterson; David Reed; Tipz; Carnoy "Ayo Kayo" Watkins; Desmond "Motown" Washington

TLC chronology
20 (2013)	TLC (2017)

Singles from TLC
- 1. "Haters" Released: October 26, 2016; 2. "Joy Ride" Released: October 26, 2016; 3. "Way Back" Released: April 14, 2017

TLC is the fifth and final studio album by American girl group TLC, released on June 30, 2017, by their label 852 Musiq. TLC partnered with various distribution companies: Sony Music RED (North America), Liberation Music (Australia), Warner Music Group (Japan), and Cooking Vinyl (the rest of the world). TLC is mainly a R&B album with 1990s music influences. It is their first studio album in 15 years following the 2002 release of 3D.

The album received generally positive reviews from critics, many of whom praised the throwback sound included on the album, though some criticized the album for not living up to their legacy. The album debuted at number 38 on the Billboard 200 chart, selling 12,000 album-equivalent units in its first week, 11,000 of which were pure sales. The album also reached number 20 on the Top R&B/Hip-Hop Albums chart and number 40 on the UK Albums Chart.

TLC spawned the single "Way Back", which became their fourth Billboard Adult R&B top-10 entry, eventually peaking at number eight. "Haters" and "Joy Ride" were released internationally as the lead and second singles.

The UK-only deluxe edition features re-recorded versions of the singles "No Scrubs", "Creep", "Unpretty", "Baby-Baby-Baby", and "Diggin' on You". The same recordings were included in the Japan-only 2013 release TLC 20: 20th Anniversary Hits and were used in the group's television biopic CrazySexyCool: The TLC Story.

== Background ==
On January 19, 2015, TLC announced their plan to release what they called their "final" album with the launch of a Kickstarter campaign. They asked fans to help finance the project by donating a pledge of at least $5 to reach their goal of $150,000. In less than 48 hours, they surpassed their goal and became the "fastest most funded pop project in Kickstarter history". Among other artists who donated were New Kids on the Block (donating $10,000), Katy Perry (donating $5,000), Soulja Boy, Bette Midler and Justin Timberlake. The Kickstarter campaign raised a total of $400,000. In an interview published following the end of the campaign, Watkins and Thomas clarified that they would never split up following the release and promotion of the album, and that they would continue to perform together as TLC.

During the development of their album, Watkins and Thomas petitioned Lisa Lopes' brother Ron Lopes for assistance with making Left Eye's presence on the album a possibility since she had an abundance of unreleased material. However, they ultimately passed on using any of Lopes' archive recordings as the available source material conflicted with the sound that they were recording for the album. However, wanting to make a tribute to Lopes as a member of TLC, they settled on creating an interlude sampling portions of her interviews for the album.

== Promotion ==
"Haters" and "Joy Ride" were released as the lead and second singles on October 26, 2016, with "Haters" being released exclusively in Japan and New Zealand, respectively, on November 1. The former was later released in the United Kingdom on May 5, 2017.

The album's third single "Way Back" featuring Snoop Dogg was released on April 14, 2017. The single was produced by D'Mile and was released via TLC's independent label 852 Musiq which is distributed through RED Distribution in the US. The group first performed the song in London in May 2017. In the United States, the group promoted the single, album, and the I Love the 90s: The Party Continues Tour with performances on Today and Jimmy Kimmel Live!.

"American Gold" and "It's Sunny" were released as promotional singles prior to the album's release. "American Gold" was announced as the fourth single in the United States in June 2017 by the track's songwriter Candace Wakefield. However, no such release materialized and no further singles were released from the album.

== Critical reception ==
Professional ratings
Aggregate scores
Source	Rating
AnyDecentMusic?	6.4/10
Metacritic	63/100
Review scores
Source	Rating
AllMusic	2.5/5 stars
Clash	6/10
Drowned in Sound	7/10
Entertainment Weekly	B−
The Guardian	4/5 stars
NME	3/5 stars
Paste	6.1/10
Pitchfork	7.4/10
Prefix Magazine	7/10
Slant Magazine	2/5 stars

TLC received generally positive reviews from music critics. On Metacritic, which assigns a normalized rating out of 100 to reviews from critics, the album received an average score of 63 based on 15 reviews. Rachel Aroesti of The Guardian gave the album 4 stars out of 5, calling the album "deeply nostalgic" also stating that it "proves that their winning formula still works." Andy Kellman of AllMusic criticized the album, calling the album "more suited for Radio Disney than for the Hot 97", also targeting the song Haters, saying that it felt like it was more or so written for a teen pop girl group. In a mixed review, Felicity Martin of Clash praised their comeback single "Way Back", calling it the perfect comeback single, and praised some other songs included on the album, however, criticizing songs such as "It's Sunny" for being cheesy. In a positive review, Jim Farber of Entertainment Weekly said that the songs on the album were great, but that they did not compare to their past music. Despite this comment, he stated that they were able to move ahead in one aspect: their mature perspective of nostalgia. In another mixed review, Nick Levine of NME criticized some of the songs' cheesiness, along with criticizing some of the songs included on the album for sounding like every other song in the R&B genre. Despite these complaints, he praised the song Scandalous, calling it a return to their former edge. In a positive review, Julianne Shepherd of Pitchfork praised the girl-power anthems included on the album, however stating that the songs do not hold up to their former glory. In another positive review, Philippa Barr of Drowned in Sound praised the dance club anthems on the album, along with the empowerment anthems. However, she criticized the cliché in the song "It's Sunny".

== Commercial performance ==
In the United States, TLC debuted at number 38 on the Billboard 200 chart, selling 12,000 album-equivalent units, 11,000 of which were pure sales. The album spent one week on the chart, marking TLC's lowest-charting studio album, and lowest-running studio album. The album performed similarly on the UK Albums Chart when it debuted at number 40; the album charted five spots higher than 3D (2002), making it their highest-charting album on the chart since FanMail (1999).

On the Scottish Albums Chart, the album debuted at number 72, spending one week on the chart. The album also managed to debut at number seven on the Recorded Music NZ Heatseeker Albums chart, where it spent one week on the chart.

== Track listing ==
Standard edition track listing
No.	Title	Writer(s)	Producer(s)	Length
1.	"No Introduction"	Candace Wakefield; Elvis Brown; Carnoy "Ayo Kayo" Watkins	Dunlap Exclusive; Joshua "Tipz" Richardson; Cory "Knotch" Marks	3:02
2.	"Way Back" (featuring Snoop Dogg)	Tionne "T-Boz" Watkins; James Abrahart; Calvin Broadus	D'Mile	3:46
3.	"It's Sunny"	Bobby Hebb; Albert McKay; Maurice White; Alta Willis; T. Watkins; Rebekah Muhammad	Ron Fair	3:23
4.	"Haters"	Michael Busbee; Daniel Ullman; Bryan Jarett; Maureen McDonald	Busbee; Casper & B.	2:40
5.	"Perfect Girls"	T. Watkins; Candace Wakefield; Raylene S. Arreguin	Ayo Kayo; David "Davey Remix" Reed; Desmond "Motown" Washington	3:05
6.	"Interlude"		Desmond Peterson	1:11
7.	"Start a Fire"	T. Watkins; Gabrielle Nowee; Candace Wakefield	Kayo	4:02
8.	"American Gold"	T. Watkins; Nowee; Candace Wakefield; Brown	Kayo; Tipz	3:38
9.	"Scandalous"	Tommy "Vegas" Doyle; Timothy Clayton; Rozonda "Chilli" Thomas; Cory Allen Moore	Cory Mo	3:32
10.	"Aye Muthafucka"	T. Watkins; Marqueze Etheridge; Nowee	Drephantom; Tipz	3:16
11.	"Joy Ride"	Muhammad	Knotch; Tipz; Chris "Big Duke" Malloy; Niko McKnight; Raymond "Ray Keys" Komba	4:18
12.	"Way Back" (featuring Snoop Dogg; extended version)	T. Watkins; Abrahart; Broadus; Dernst Emile II	D'Mile	4:26
Total length:				41:05

Deluxe edition (bonus tracks)
No.	Title	Writer(s)	Producer(s)	Length
13.	"No Scrubs" (2013 re-recording)	Kandi Burruss; Tameka Cottle; Kevin "She'kspere" Briggs	She'kspere	3:32
14.	"Creep" (2013 re-recording)	Dallas Austin	Austin	4:23
15.	"Unpretty" (2013 re-recording)	Austin; T. Watkins	Austin	4:38
16.	"Baby-Baby-Baby" (2013 re-recording)	Antonio "L.A." Reid; Kenneth "Babyface" Edmonds; Daryl Simmons	Reid; Babyface; Simmons	4:58
17.	"Diggin' on You" (2013 re-recording)	Edmonds	Babyface	4:09
Total length:				62:45

Japanese and online store standard edition (bonus tracks)
No.	Title	Writer(s)	Producer(s)	Length
13.	"Joy Ride" (TJO remix)	Muhammad; Komba Raymond Aiah Jr.; Knotch; Tipz	Tipz; Knotch	4:18
14.	"It's Sunny" (Lucas Valentine remix)	Hebb; McKay; White; Willis; T. Watkins; Muhammad	Fair; Lucas Valentine	3:23
Total length:				48:46

== Personnel ==
Credits for TLC adapted from AllMusic.

- Chris Athens – mastering
- Luke Austin – keyboards
- Leslie Brathwaite – mastering, mixing
- Mike Busbee – production
- Casper & B. – production
- Bill Diggins – production
- Theodore "NoizeBeatz" Lawrence – production
- Charles Dunlap – production
- Terrence "Grad Teachem" Dunlap – vocals
- Devon Eisenberger – guitar
- Dernst Emile II – keyboards, production, programming
- Ron Fair – additional production, engineering, executive production, piano, production, vocal production
- Kevin Hellon – bass
- Debra Killings – background vocals
- Raymond Komba – keyboards, production
- Dennis Leupold – photography
- Chris Malloy – production
- Cory "Knotch" Marks – drum programming, production, programming
- Niko McKnight – guitar, production
- Cory Mo – drum programming, engineering, keyboards, mixing, production, synthesizer, vocal engineering
- Zach Nicholls – engineering, mixing, mixing engineering, vocal engineering
- Desmond Peterson – production
- David Reed – production
- Joshua "Tipz" Richardson – engineering, production
- Lucas Sader – guitars
- Peter Sharkey – programming
- Snoop Dogg – featured artist
- Gavin Taylor – creative direction, design
- Patrick Thrall – vocal engineering
- TLC – primary artist
- Desmond "Motown" Washington – production
- Carnoy "Ayo Kayo" Watkins – production
- Tionne "T-Boz" Watkins – production

== Charts ==
Chart performance for TLC
Chart (2017)	Peak position
Australian Albums (ARIA)	117
Belgian Albums (Ultratop Flanders)	166
German Albums (Offizielle Top 100)	81
Greek Albums (IFPI)	42
Japanese Albums (Oricon)	62
New Zealand Heatseeker Albums (RMNZ)	7
Scottish Albums (Official Charts)	72
UK Albums (Official Charts)	40
UK Independent Albums (Official Charts)	3
UK R&B Albums (Official Charts)	1
US Billboard 200	38
US Independent Albums (Billboard)	1
US Top R&B/Hip-Hop Albums (Billboard)	20

== Sales ==
Sales figures for TLC
Region	Sales
Japan	4,586

== Release history ==
List of release dates and formats for TLC
Region	Date	Format	Edition	Label
United States	June 30, 2017	CD; digital download	Standard; deluxe	852 Musiq; Sony Music RED
United Kingdom	June 30, 2017	CD; digital download	Standard; deluxe	Cooking Vinyl
France	June 30, 2017	CD; digital download	Standard; deluxe	Cooking Vinyl
