= Haters (TLC song) =

Single by TLC

from the album TLC
- Released: October 26, 2016
- Recorded: 2016
- Length: 2:40
- Label: 852 Musiq
- Songwriters: Michael Busbee; Daniel Ullman; Bryan Jarett; Maureen McDonald

TLC singles chronology
"Gift Wrapped Kiss" (2014)	"Haters" (2016)	"Joy Ride" (2016)

Music video
- "Haters" on YouTube

"Haters" is a song by American girl group TLC, from their fifth and final studio album, TLC (2017). It was released as the lead single on October 26, 2016, in Japan and November 1, 2016 in New Zealand. The song was later re-released on May 5, 2017, in other countries. The song was written by Michael Busbee, Daniel Ullman, Bryan Jarett, Maureen McDonald.

The song was first sung by the British girl group The Rosso Sisters in 2014 under the name "We Don't Care About That Anyway". It was performed live by the group during Demi Lovato's Neon Lights Tour, but never released as a single.

== Background and promotion ==
On October 26, 2016, TLC released two singles "Haters" and "Joy Ride" exclusively in Japan as a follow-up to promote their upcoming fifth studio album TLC. "Joyride" shot to number one on the iTunes chart in Japan upon its release. On November 1, 2016, the song was released in New Zealand. The song was before released as "We Don't Care About That Anyway" by The Rosso Sisters in 2014.

== Critical reception ==
The song was met with positive reviews from critics. Billboard gave a positive review of the song "Last month, Chilli and T-Boz shared the first single from that album, the Snoop Dogg collab "Way Back". And now they've got another new song. This one is called "Haters", and like their 1999 hit "Unpretty", it's a sort of self-empowerment anthem, a call to stop listening to whatever petty criticisms people might have. Also, TLC invited some of their fans to be in the Haters video. TLC included them as a thank you for their support and also to inspire them not to let haters deter them from being themselves. The production is a throwback, too, to that late-'90s retro-futuristic style." HotNewHipHop called the track an "empowering anthem" stating "Bringing the title to life, T-Boz & Chilli call out their "haters" & naysayers in this empowering new single, while promoting self-confidence in the process. "Haters gonna hate / People gon' say what they gon' say / We don't care about that anyway," they sing."

== Track listings ==
Digital download
No.	Title	Length
1.	"Haters"	2:40

== Release history ==
Country	Date	Format	Label	Ref.
Japan	October 26, 2016	Digital download	Warner Music Japan	
New Zealand	November 1, 2016	Digital download	Liberator Music	
United Kingdom	May 5, 2017	Digital download	Cooking Vinyl	
