= What Chilli Wants =

- Genre: Reality
- Starring: Rozonda "Chilli" Thomas; Tionna T. Smalls
- Country of origin: United States
- Original language: English
- No. of seasons: 2
- No. of episodes: 16

Production
- Executive producers: Bill Diggins; Jeff Olde; Jim Ackerman; Kevin Williams; Larry Barron; Mike Riley; Rozonda "Chilli" Thomas
- Running time: 22 minutes
- Production company: FremantleMedia North America

Original release
- Network: VH1
- Release: April 11, 2010 – February 27, 2011

What Chilli Wants is an American reality television series that premiered on April 11, 2010, on VH1 starring Chilli. The series chronicles Chilli's quest to find love with the help of Tionna T. Smalls, an author and relationship coach. Not only is she looking for love, but also a husband and hopes to have another baby. The series was renewed for a second season on May 26, 2010.

== Episodes ==
=== Series overview ===
Season	Episodes	Originally released	
Season	Episodes	First released	Last released
1	8	April 11, 2010	May 30, 2010
2	8	January 2, 2011	February 27, 2011

=== Season 1 (2010) ===
No. overall	No. in season	Title	Original release date	US viewers (millions)
1	1	"The Checklist"	April 11, 2010	1.60
2	2	"The 1-900 Voice"	April 18, 2010	N/A
3	3	"The Floyd Situation"	April 25, 2010	N/A
4	4	"You Got Your Sweat On Me"	May 2, 2010	1.21
5	5	"The Revelation"	May 9, 2010	1.30
6	6	"The Calendar Model"	May 16, 2010	N/A
7	7	"The Bread Incident"	May 23, 2010	1.14
8	8	"The Choice"	May 30, 2010	1.00

=== Season 2 (2011) ===
No. overall	No. in season	Title	Original release date	US viewers (millions)
9	1	"Your Biological Clock is Ticking"	January 2, 2011	N/A
10	2	"I May Be Your Better Half"	January 9, 2011	1.18
11	3	"When It Starts Right, It Ends Right..."	January 16, 2011	0.98
12	4	"Honesty. Honestly."	January 23, 2011	0.90
13	5	"Never Make It End"	January 30, 2011	0.95
14	6	"Cheating and Trust"	February 13, 2011	0.68
15	7	"Do You Believe in Marriage?"	February 20, 2011	0.60
16	8	"Fertility and the Future"	February 27, 2011	0.87
