= Red Light Special =

1995 single by TLC

Single by TLC

from the album CrazySexyCool
- B-side: "My Secret Enemy"
- Released: February 17, 1995
- Recorded: 1994
- Studio: Music Grinder (Los Angeles, California)
- Length: 5:04
- Label: LaFace; Arista
- Songwriter: Babyface
- Producer: Babyface

TLC singles chronology
"Creep" (1994)	"Red Light Special" (1995)	"Waterfalls" (1995)

Music video
- "Red Light Special" on YouTube

"Red Light Special" is a song by American vocal girl group TLC for their second studio album, CrazySexyCool (1994). Written and produced by Babyface. LaFace and Arista Records released the song as the second single from the album on February 17, 1995. The song achieved chart success, reaching number one on the US Billboard Top 40/Rhythm-Crossover chart and number two on the Billboard Hot 100 chart. Matthew Rolston filmed its music video, which features the group performing in a brothel.

== Critical reception ==
Steve Baltin from Cash Box felt the song "lives up to its name as one of the sultriest, sexiest singles to come along in years. Slow and entrancing, “Red Light Special” has definitely got the groove going on. A smash." Dave Sholin from the Gavin Report remarked that in numerous markets, this has been in heavy rotation for weeks. He also viewed it as "another example of why Babyface is the hottest writer/producer in the business. Flawless." Caroline Sullivan from The Guardian wrote that here, TLC "turn on the sweetness in inverse proportion to the raunchiness of the tune", adding that the song "which uses old blues imagery to express steamy lust, is superficially one of the prettiest numbers [on the album]." Dennis Hunt from Los Angeles Times named it a "strong tune" from the CrazySexyCool album, and a "steamy Babyface production".

In his weekly UK chart commentary, James Masterton found that here, TLC are "slipping into a distinctly American summer groove to make what is arguably one of their best records ever and surpasses at a stroke the No.22 peak of "Creep" back in January." Simon Price from Melody Maker named "Red Light Special" "the finest shag song since...well, I can't remember. It's been a long time." Ralph Tee from Music Week's RM Dance Update stated, "The follow-up to 'Creep' is this beat ballad from the album. The pace of this genre of music is getting so slow now that if it's not careful it'll soon grind to a halt. Gerald Hall provides a mix that beefs up the rhythms a little to generate marginal dancefloor potential but the tune still needs a few rewinds to get into it." Charles Aaron from Spin commented, "Sexy, sexier, sexiest. If you liked 'em better when they were more like cartoons, you should wise up."

== Music video ==
Shot in December 1994, the accompanying music video for "Red Light Special" was directed by American artist, photographer, director and creative director Matthew Rolston and is set in a brothel. Male actors portray prostitutes and Left Eye plays a pimp while Chilli and T-Boz portray customers playing strip poker. A young Boris Kodjoe is featured as one of the male prostitutes. T-Boz is seen being caressed by a man in a room. Chilli is seen dancing with the guitar player. There are also black and white solo shots of the girls singing.

The music video has three versions: one labelled "Sexy", the second "Sexier" and the final version "Sexiest". As a result of more sexually suggestive and racy footage being used in versions two and three, the first version is widely broadcast.

== B-side: "My Secret Enemy" ==
For the CD single of "Red Light Special", Lopes produced a brilliant and darkly confessional B-side called "My Secret Enemy". On this relatively obscure track, Lopes explored the Rison incident – and her own conflicted feelings about it – with astonishing depth and style. It is such an exciting departure from the work the group has done with established producers that you start to feel that TLC’s album output thus far only hints at the women’s true capabilities.

— Carol Cooper of Rolling Stone

The "Red Light Special" single contains the B-side "My Secret Enemy", a rap track led by Lisa "Left Eye" Lopes, who wrote the track alongside Steve Keitt and R.A.S. Posse. Its lyrical content focuses on Lopes's coverage in the media and her relationship with Andre Rison. Lopes went on to say that the song came out directly after the incident that saw her accidentally set fire to Rison's Atlanta mansion. "It happened right after that incident and I was feeling like I needed a way out," said Lopes of the track.

== Track listings ==
- US 7-inch and cassette single

A. "Red Light Special" – 5:02
B. "Red Light Special" (instrumental) – 5:02

- US 12-inch single

A1. "Red Light Special" (L.A.'s Flava mix extended version) – 6:02
A2. "Red Light Special" (album version) – 5:02
A3. "Red Light Special" (Gerald Hall's remix) – 5:09
B1. "Red Light Special" (acapella version) – 5:40
B2. "Red Light Special" (instrumental) – 5:02
B3. "My Secret Enemy" – 5:34

- US and Australian CD single
1. "Red Light Special" (radio edit) – 4:40
2. "Red Light Special" (L.A.'s Flava mix) – 4:28
3. "Red Light Special" (album version) – 5:02
4. "Red Light Special" (Gerald's Hall remix) – 5:09
5. "My Secret Enemy" – 5:34
- US maxi-cassette single
1. "Red Light Special" (radio edit)
2. "Red Light Special" (L.A.'s Flava mix)
3. "Red Light Special" (L.A.'s Flava mix extended version)
4. "Red Light Special" (Gerald Hall's remix)
5. "My Secret Enemy"
- UK CD single
1. "Red Light Special" (radio edit) – 4:40
2. "Red Light Special" (L.A.'s Flava mix) – 4:28
3. "Red Light Special" (Gerald's Hall remix) – 5:09
4. "My Secret Enemy" – 5:34
- UK 12-inch single

A1. "Red Light Special" (L.A.'s Flava mix extended version) – 6:02
A2. "Red Light Special" (album version) – 5:02
A3. "Red Light Special" (Gerald's Hall remix) – 5:09
B1. "Red Light Special" (acapella) – 5:40
B2. "Red Light Special" (instrumental) – 5:02

- UK cassette single and European CD single
1. "Red Light Special" (radio edit) – 4:40
2. "My Secret Enemy" – 5:34
- Japanese CD single
1. "Red Light Special" (radio edit)
2. "Red Light Special" (L.A.'s Flava mix)
3. "Creep" (Jermaine's Jeep mix)
4. "My Secret Enemy"

== Charts ==
=== Weekly charts ===
Chart (1995)	Peak position
Australia (ARIA)	53
Canada Top Singles (RPM)	19
Canada Dance/Urban (RPM)	8
Europe (Eurochart Hot 100)	84
Europe (European Hit Radio)	35
Israel (IBA)	38
Netherlands (Dutch Top 40 Tipparade)	12
Netherlands (Single Top 100 Tipparade)	9
New Zealand (Recorded Music NZ)	9
Scottish Singles Sales (Official Charts)	64
UK Singles (Official Charts)	18
UK Dance (Official Charts)	14
UK Hip Hop/R&B (Official Charts)	5
US Billboard Hot 100	2
US Dance Singles Sales (Billboard)	9
US Hot R&B/Hip-Hop Songs (Billboard)	3
US Pop Airplay (Billboard)	11
US Rhythmic Airplay (Billboard)	1
US Cash Box Top 100	2

=== Year-end charts ===
Chart (1995)	Position
Brazil (Crowley)	31
US Billboard Hot 100	28
US Hot R&B Singles (Billboard)	32
US Top 40/Rhythm-Crossover (Billboard)	9
US Cash Box Top 100	19

== Certifications ==
Region	Certification	Certified units/sales
New Zealand (RMNZ)	Gold	5,000^{*}
United States (RIAA)	Gold	700,000
^{*} Sales figures based on certification alone.

== Release history ==
Region	Date	Format(s)	Label(s)	Ref.
United States	February 17, 1995	7-inch vinyl; 12-inch vinyl; CD; cassette	LaFace	
Sweden	April 3, 1995	CD	LaFace; Arista	
Japan	April 21, 1995	CD	LaFace	
Australia	May 22, 1995	CD; cassette	LaFace	
