= Diggin' on You =

1995 single by TLC

Single by TLC

from the album CrazySexyCool
- B-side: "Nobody Knows"
- Released: October 10, 1995
- Recorded: 1993 – September 1994
- Studio: Music Grinder (Hollywood, California)
- Genre: Pop
- Length: 4:14
- Label: LaFace; Arista
- Songwriter: Babyface
- Producer: Babyface

TLC singles chronology
"Waterfalls" (1995)	"Diggin' on You" (1995)	"No Scrubs" (1999)

Music video
- "Diggin' on You" on YouTube

"Diggin' on You" is a song by American girl group TLC, from the group's second studio album, CrazySexyCool (1994). The song was written and produced by Babyface. It was released by LaFace and Arista Records on October 10, 1995, as the fourth and final single from their album. A pop ballad, the song consists of a guitar, synthesizer and drum machine. The lyrics depict a relationship between a male and female during a summer afternoon.

"Diggin' on You" received generally positive reviews from music critics, many of whom praised the production. The song peaked at number five on the US Billboard Hot 100, number six on the Australian ARIA Singles Chart, and at number 18 on the UK Singles Chart. It was certified gold in the United States, Australia, and New Zealand. An accompanying music video was released in October 1995, and is directed by F. Gary Gray. It features TLC performing at a live concert in Las Vegas. "Diggin' on You" has been covered by several artists, while the music video introduction was sampled on Jay-Z's 2002 song "Hovi Baby".

== Background and composition ==
"Diggin' on You" was written and produced by American musician Babyface. The song was recorded at The Music Grinder Studios in Hollywood, California, from 1993 to September 1994, during production of TLC's second studio album, CrazySexyCool (1994). It was sent to contemporary hit radio in the United States on October 10, 1995, and released as a single in the United Kingdom on October 23, 1995. "Diggin' on You" was the fourth and final single to be released from CrazySexyCool. The cover art was photographed by Arnold Turner.

Musically, "Diggin' on You" is a pop ballad, with a soul-pop influence. The song contains a "jeep beat" with a "streetwise vibe", and incorporates a hook. It consists of a guitar, with Babyface's synthesizer and drum machine arrangement. Lyrically, "Diggin' on You" depicts a boy hooking up with a girl "chillin' with [her] Kool-Aid in a park", with Lynn Ford of Indianapolis News opining that it has "a romantic aura steeped in young love". Writing for the Star Tribune, Chuck Campbell noted that "women [...] luxuriate in falling in love" during the song. Throughout the two verses, Tionne "T-Boz" Watkins sings about encountering a man while relaxing on a summer afternoon with Kool-Aid. Watkins, Rozonda "Chilli" Thomas, Debra Killings, and Bebé provide background vocals.

Several "Diggin' on You" remixes were released, which Billboard commented ranged from a live brass version with jazz-inspired horns, to a pop and house hybrid. Writing for Record Mirror, Ralph Tee described C.J. Mackintosh's mix to be "slick [and] smooth" and sonically similar to Roy Ayers, the Untouchables production to contain a "darker hip hop" atmosphere, and compared the tone of Soulshock's remix to R. Kelly.

== Critical reception and commercial performance ==
Writing for The Guardian, Ross Jones praised Babyface's "sultry" production on "Diggin' on You" and opined that monks would be "comely" intrigued by TLC's "dirty phone-call" vocals. Chuck Arnold of Philadelphia Daily News stated that the song is one of three tracks on CrazySexyCool to be "radio-ready", while Langston Wertz Jr. of The Charlotte Observer and Cheryl Jackson of The Tampa Tribune considered "Diggin' on You" to be "sexy (and memorable)" and "laid-back" respectively. Mark Frith from Smash Hits gave it two out of five, saying it "just doesn't do anything for me. It's nice in a summery way but the real TLC chart action won't happen until the re-release of 'Creep' at the beginning of next year."

Tee gave the song's remixes a four out of five rating and considered Mackintosh's mix to be "the best". While reviewing the European 12-inch single of "Diggin' on You", James Hamilton of Record Mirror described Eddie F's remix as "slinky rolling" accompanied by the TLC members' "husk[y]" and "[coo]ing" vocals, Soulshock's production as "delicately weaving", Mackintosh's mix as "chunk[y]" and "jiggling", and the Going Home Dub as "repetitive stuttery cantoring".

In the United States, "Diggin' on You" peaked at number five on the Billboard Hot 100 chart dated December 30, 1995, where it remained for 20 weeks. The song received a gold certification by the Recording Industry Association of America (RIAA) on January 3, 1996, for selling 500,000 copies in the US. In Australia, "Diggin' on You" debuted at number 36 on the ARIA Singles Chart dated January 21, 1996. It peaked at number six on the chart dated March 10, 1996, and was certified gold for sales of 35,000 track-equivalent units in the country. The song peaked at number eight on the New Zealand Singles Chart dated November 26, 1995, and charted for 10 weeks. It received a gold certification by Recorded Music NZ (RMNZ), for sales of 5,000 track-equivalent units in New Zealand. In the United Kingdom, "Diggin' on You" bowed at number 18 on the UK Singles Chart dated November 4, 1995, where it remained for five weeks. On the Irish Singles Chart, the song debuted on the chart dated November 2, 1995. It peaked at number 21 and charted for four weeks.

== Music video and legacy ==
An accompanying music video for "Diggin' on You" aired on MTV in October 1995, after "Kick Your Game" was sent to radio stations and TLC's management needed another song to be promoted as its replacement. It was directed by F. Gary Gray, who returned from directing the video for TLC's previous song "Waterfalls" during the same year. The video begins with the group arriving at a Las Vegas concert via helicopter, which opens with fanfare and uses the song's video version. They perform in front of a loud audience, with the members' appearance described by Billboard writer Brett Atwood as "larger-than-life". The music video was filmed at MGM Grand Las Vegas and Madison Square Garden during TLC's tour, which Gray acknowledged that the venues' restrictions impacted filming and consequently stifled his creativity.

The "Diggin' on You" music video introduction was sampled on Jay-Z's 2002 song "Hovi Baby", which was produced by Just Blaze. American musician Sevyn Streeter performed a cover version of "Diggin' on You" as an a cappella on YouTube, which Da'Shan Smith of Billboard declared as "soft-rock&B". Smith additionally compared "Diggin' on You" to Streeter's 2013 song "It Won't Stop", noting that both contain lyrics regarding "an endless infatuation with a lover". In 2017, Canadian producer Kaytranada released a 2-step club remix of the song on his SoundCloud account, which was considered "irresistible" by Paper writer Sandra Song, and "breezy" by Max Mohenu of Vice. Kelly Clarkson performed a cover of "Diggin' on You" on The Kelly Clarkson Show episode dated March 29, 2021, where she was accompanied by a band and performed atop a purple and yellow-lit set.

== Track listings ==
US CD single

No.	Title	Length
1.	"Diggin' on You" (Album Version)	4:14
2.	"Diggin' on You" (L.A.'s Live Remix)	4:40
3.	"Nobody Knows" (Tony Rich special preview)	1:49

US 12-inch single

Side A
No.	Title	Length
1.	"Diggin' on You" (CJ's Club Mix)	9:23
2.	"Diggin' on You" (Eddie F.'s Untouchable Remix)	5:06
3.	"Diggin' on You" (CJ's House Mix)	9:38
4.	"Diggin' on You" (Acappella)	3:54

Side B
No.	Title	Length
1.	"Diggin' on You" (Soulpower Remix)	5:54
2.	"Diggin' on You" (Album Version)	4:14
3.	"Diggin' on You" (L.A.'s Live Remix)	4:37
4.	"Diggin' on You" (Album Instrumental)	4:14

US cassette single

No.	Title	Length
1.	"Diggin' on You" (Album Version)	4:14
2.	"Diggin' on You" (L.A.'s Live Remix)	4:37

US maxi single

No.	Title	Length
1.	"Diggin' on You" (L.A.'s Live Remix)	4:37
2.	"Diggin' on You" (Soulpower Remix)	5:54
3.	"Diggin' on You" (CJ's Club Edit)	4:13
4.	"Diggin' on You" (Eddie F's Untouchable Remix)	5:06
5.	"Diggin' on You" (Album Version)	4:14

UK CD single

No.	Title	Length
1.	"Diggin' on You" (Original Radio Edit)	4:17
2.	"Diggin' on You" (Master 7" Mix) (C.J. Mackintosh)	3:55
3.	"Diggin' on You" (Live Version)	4:46

European CD single/UK CD2

No.	Title	Length
1.	"Diggin' on You" (Soul Power Mix)	5:54
2.	"Diggin' on You" (Untouchables Mix)	5:30
3.	"Diggin' on You" (Going Home Dub)	9:22

European 12-inch single

Side A
No.	Title	Length
1.	"Diggin' on You" (Master 7" Mix) (90bpm)	3:52
2.	"Diggin' on You" (Untouchables Mix) (82.3bpm)	5:30

Side B
No.	Title	Length
1.	"Diggin' on You" (Going Home Dub) (0-124bpm)	9:22
2.	"Diggin' on You" (Soul Power Mix) (0-82bpm)	5:51

Remixes digital download

No.	Title	Length
1.	"Diggin' on You" (Single Edit)	4:13
2.	"Diggin' on You" (L.A.'s Live Edit)	4:16
3.	"Diggin' on You" (Eddie F's Untouchables Remix)	5:30
4.	"Diggin' on You" (CJ's Master 7" Mix)	3:52
5.	"Diggin' on You" (C.J.'s House Edit)	4:19
6.	"Diggin' on You" (CJ's Club Mix)	4:14
7.	"Diggin' on You" (Going Home Dub)	9:22
8.	"Diggin' on You" (Soulpower Remix – Edit)	4:24
9.	"Diggin' on You" (Soulpower Remix)	5:51

== Credits and personnel ==
Credits adapted from the back cover of "Diggin' on You".

- Recorded by Brad Gilderman at The Music Grinder Studios, Hollywood, California
- Assisted by Eric Fischer and Lamont Hyde
- Mixed by Dave Way at Larrabee Sound Studios, Los Angeles, California
- All synthesizers and drum programming by Babyface
- Background vocals by T-Boz, Chilli, Debra Killings, Bebé

== Charts ==
=== Weekly charts ===
Weekly chart performance for "Diggin' on You"
Chart (1995–1996)	Peak position
Australia (ARIA)	6
Canada Top Singles (RPM)	62
Canada Adult Contemporary (RPM)	43
Europe (Eurochart Hot 100)	45
Europe (European Dance Radio)	3
Europe (European Hit Radio)	19
Germany (GfK)	46
Ireland (IRMA)	21
Israel (IBA)	22
Netherlands (Dutch Top 40)	36
Netherlands (Single Top 100)	32
New Zealand (Recorded Music NZ)	8
Scottish Singles Sales (Official Charts)	37
Switzerland (Schweizer Hitparade)	29
UK Singles (Official Charts)	18
UK Hip Hop/R&B (Official Charts)	2
US Billboard Hot 100	5
US Dance Singles Sales (Billboard)	8
US Hot R&B/Hip-Hop Songs (Billboard)	7
US Pop Airplay (Billboard)	5
US Rhythmic Airplay (Billboard)	6

=== Year-end charts ===
Year-end chart performance for "Diggin' on You"
Chart (1996)	Position
Australia (ARIA)	41
Europe (European Dance Radio)	18
US Billboard Hot 100	45
US Hot R&B Singles (Billboard)	67
US Top 40/Mainstream (Billboard)	40
US Top 40/Rhythm-Crossover (Billboard)	37

== Certifications ==
Certifications and sales for "Diggin' on You"
Region	Certification	Certified units/sales
Australia (ARIA)	Gold	35,000^{^}
New Zealand (RMNZ)	Gold	5,000^{*}
United States (RIAA)	Gold	500,000^{^}
^{*} Sales figures based on certification alone.^{^} Shipments figures based on certification alone.

== Release history ==
Release dates and formats for "Diggin' on You"
Region	Date	Format(s)	Label(s)	Ref.
United States	October 10, 1995	Contemporary hit radio	LaFace; Arista	
Sweden	October 23, 1995	CD single	LaFace; Arista	
United Kingdom	October 23, 1995	12-inch single; cassette single; CD single	LaFace; Arista	
Japan	December 24, 1995	CD single	LaFace	
