= Waterfalls (TLC song) =

1995 single by TLC

Single by TLC

from the album CrazySexyCool
- Released: May 29, 1995
- Studio: D.A.R.P., Doppler, Bosstown (Atlanta, Georgia)
- Genre: R&B; hip-hop; pop
- Length: 4:40 (album version); 4:19 (single edit); 3:32 (no rap edit)
- Label: LaFace; Arista
- Songwriters: Marqueze Etheridge; Lisa Lopes; Organized Noize
- Producer: Organized Noize

TLC singles chronology
"Red Light Special" (1995)	"Waterfalls" (1995)	"Diggin' on You" (1995)

Music video
- "Waterfalls" on YouTube

"Waterfalls" is a song by American girl group TLC, released on May 29, 1995, by LaFace and Arista as the third single from the group's second album, CrazySexyCool (1994). The song addresses the illegal drug trade, promiscuity, and HIV/AIDS. "Waterfalls" was the first number-one song to refer to AIDS, according to BMG's Jarett E. Nolan.

Often considered one of the group's signature songs, "Waterfalls" was an international hit, topping the charts in many countries. The song spent seven weeks at No. 1 on the Billboard Hot 100, giving the group their second US No. 1; it was the No. 2 song of the year on the Billboard 1995 year-end chart. "Waterfalls" also peaked at No. 1 in New Zealand, Switzerland and Zimbabwe while reaching the top 10 in several other countries, including Australia, Canada and the United Kingdom. "Waterfalls" received critical acclaim, earning two Grammy nominations at the 38th Annual Grammy Awards in 1996 for Record of the Year and Best Pop Performance by a Duo or Group with Vocal.

The song's music video, directed by F. Gary Gray, reflected its socially conscious lyrics via a million-dollar budget. It became an MTV staple, making TLC the first act to stay atop the MTV Video Monitor chart for over a month. The video won four MTV Video Music Awards in 1995, including Video of the Year, making them the first African-American act to receive the trophy.

== Background ==
"Waterfalls" is an R&B, hip-hop and pop song written by TLC band member Lisa "Left Eye" Lopes with Marqueze Etheridge and Organized Noize, who also produced the song. Rozonda "Chilli" Thomas and Tionne "T-Boz" Watkins perform the song with Lopes, who also provides a rap verse (which is removed from some edits). The members of TLC, as well as Debra Killings and CeeLo Green, provide background vocals, while the improvised bass line is provided by LaMarquis "ReMarqable" Jefferson. Of Green's involvement, Watkins noted, "He was in Goodie Mob, we grew up together, we go way back. He (sang on the track) and it was amazing! I love his voice." Green later recalled to The Guardian on March 22, 2008, "I was working at the same studio and of course I know the girls too, because we were on the same label, so they just asked me. I didn't realize at the time what a big song it was going to be."

The song's lyrics refer to issues such as the HIV/AIDS epidemic and violence associated with the illegal drug trade. Watkins said that it was important for the group to "get the message across without seeming like preaching."

The TLC song shares elements with Paul McCartney's song of the same name, which opens with the line "Don't go jumping waterfalls, please keep to the lake." McCartney himself noted the resemblance, stating "In fact, somebody had a hit, a few years ago, using the first line...then they go off into another song. It's like, 'Excuse me?'"

Lopes' rap verse expresses personal problems that she was dealing with at the time. She had a very turbulent relationship with Atlanta Falcons football player Andre Rison, and on June 9, 1994, she burned numerous pairs of Rison's newly purchased tennis shoes in his fiberglass bathtub, which set his entire $2 million mansion ablaze. She pled guilty to arson and was sentenced to five years of probation and a $10,000 fine, but eventually reconciled with Rison.

== Critical reception ==
"Waterfalls" received universal acclaim from music critics. J.D. Considine from The Baltimore Sun described it as "tuneful and intoxicating". Entertainment Weekly viewed it as a "Prince-inspired ballad" that "hint[s] at the artistic greatness TLC might achieve if freed from commercial concerns". Simon Price from Melody Maker felt the song "is worthy of the symbolic sex dwarf himself." In a separate review, Price named it Single of the Week, writing, "'Waterfalls' is nothing we haven't already heard in 'Sign O' the Times' or 'The Message': a cautionary, moral tale about a bad livin' young brother who upsets his mom by gangbanging and ends up with Aids, and personally, I left all that behind with Aesop's fables. I'm more interested in the sonics here, the opulent Paisley Park-ish production, the way the freeze-dried, shrink-wrapped street soul beats are wickedly at odds with T-Boz's languorous, husky vocals and Left Eye and Chilli's river-of-clear-honey harmonics." A reviewer from Music Week gave it four out of five, calling it "yet another radio-friendly hit", remarking that "TLC swap wackiness for a more mature affair".

James Hamilton from the Record Mirror Dance Update deemed it a "slinkily croaking and cooing girls' US smash rolling slow sombrely worded message song". Charles Aaron from Spin described it as "a Princely cautionary groove, in which pop's most intriguing trio offers a more harshly vivid portrait—that of a loved one (who should have known better) gone wanna-be dopeman. When T-Boz croons, "She gives him loving that his body can't handle / But all he can say is baby it's good to me", her resigned frustration is palpable. And every time Left Eye raps, "Dreams are hopeless aspirations in hopes of comin' true", I wince a little." Nigel Butler of Sputnikmusic compared it to esteemed artists such as Sly and the Family Stone, Ray Charles and Stevie Wonder. Butler wrote, "The arrangement and instrumentation is absolutely fantastic – if a bunch of great melodies had an orgy, the result would something a little like this – and the lyrics are the best on an album that maintains a shockingly high standard of songwriting. Left-Eye drops the album's best rap on this track too."

The song was nominated for two Grammys at the 1996 Grammy Awards: Record of the Year and Best Pop Performance by a Duo or Group with Vocal. Billboard named it No. 11 on their list of "100 Greatest Girl Group Songs of All Time". It was also ranked 13th in VH1's "100 Greatest Songs of the Past 25 Years" and 8th on VH1's "100 Greatest Songs of the 1990s". In 2010, Billboard awarded the song the top position of summer songs in 1995.

== Music video ==
The accompanying music video for "Waterfalls", directed by American director and producer F. Gary Gray and filmed at Universal Studios Hollywood from June 8–9, 1995, visualizes the two verses of the song, particularly during extended instrumental breaks after each verse:

- An inner-city teen (played by Shyheim) ignores the pleas of his mother (played by Ella Joyce) to quit selling drugs; her spirit stands in front of him silently begging him to stop, but he is shot dead by a rival dealer (played by Bokeem Woodbine) as he is about to make a sale on a street corner. At the end of the video, the dead teen's own spirit is futilely trying to embrace his mother as she walks down the street, but as she can no longer see him, she walks through his ghostly form each time.
- A woman (played by Gabrielle Bramford) eschews protection as she and her boyfriend (played by Paul J. Alessi) have sex. Over time, looking in a mirror, he notices that his face shows early symptoms of AIDS. A small twin photo frame nearby shows her picture in the left while a rapid montage of all her previous lovers flashes in the right. At the end, the two wordlessly sit at the edge of her bed as the man and his picture both fade away; the woman briefly sits alone until she and her picture also fade away, after which the unused condom appears in front of the now-empty frames.

The video also intercuts scenes of liquefied versions of TLC performing to the song while standing atop an ocean and performing in front of a real waterfall. Watkins later admitted that filming the group's scenes atop an ocean was very frightening, as they were standing on an unstable plastic platform and she was unable to swim; she recalled, "I thought I was gonna fall in. That's why my feet are planted wide and still. You never see my feet move ever. You couldn't move to the front or back, you could only go side to side." The numerous computer-generated effects were created by the visual design company Homer & Associates, which used motion capture technology to generate the images. The company used the same technique in their previous work on the video for "Steam" by Peter Gabriel and in the 1992 film The Lawnmower Man.

In an interview with Billboard in 2021, Thomas explained that when discussing the video with Gray, she imagined the trio performing as water spirits, similar to the 1989 James Cameron film The Abyss; Watkins conceptualized the storylines described in the verses, while Lopes pictured the trio traversing through outer space, passing planets before arriving on Earth; Gray modified Lopes' idea to show the trio coming straight from the sky.

As Clive Davis, the president of Arista at the time, initially disliked the song, TLC had to force their mentor L.A. Reid to convince Davis to allow release as a single and promotion for the song as well as the budget for the music video; the video went on to win four awards at the 1995 MTV Video Music Awards: Video of the Year, Best Group Video, Best R&B Video, and the Viewer's Choice Award. Watkins stated in retrospect that the "video spoke for a whole epidemic."

== Live performances ==
The song was performed at many awards shows, including the 1995 MTV Video Music Awards and the 1996 Grammy Awards. The group performed "Waterfalls" at the 1995 MTV Movie Awards wearing black tops and silver pants. The performance "was theatrical and kept true to the lyrical story." They also performed the song at MTV's 20th Anniversary on August 1, 2001, making it Left Eye's final performance with the group before her death. In September 1995, TLC performed "Waterfalls" in a medley with "Creep" and "Diggin' on You" on the British TV chart show Top of the Pops, aired on BBC One in the United Kingdom.

Remaining members T-Boz and Chilli performed the song along with Alicia Keys and fellow girl groups En Vogue and SWV at the 2008 BET Awards. Thomas and Watkins appeared on Good Morning America on October 15, 2013, to perform the song during promotion for the greatest hits 20 and the VH1 biopic CrazySexyCool: The TLC Story.

On November 24, 2013, TLC performed at the 2013 American Music Awards with special guest Lil Mama, who performed Left Eye's rap as a tribute to her.

== Legacy ==
In December 1995, NME ranked "Waterfalls" number 10 in their list of "NME Writers' Top 50 Singles of 1995". In 2009, the song was ranked number 32 on Entertainment Weekly's "The 100 Greatest Summer Songs", saying, "Sad stories from the ghetto, a buoyant hook, and a water image — '90s summer hits don't get any more timely or irresistible." In 2019, About.com included it in their ranking of "The Best 100 Songs From the 1990s". Bill Lamb stated that "slinky, gently insistent backing horns and guitar combine with smooth, languid vocals to create an instant R&B classic." He also felt that the song is "a disturbing commentary on street violence and its impact on the lives of young black men." Same year, Daryl McIntosh from Albumism said it is "a rare example of perfect production, poignant songwriting, and flawless vocal delivery." McIntosh added, "The lyrics offer cautionary tales of the allure of street life and uncontrolled sexual exploration. Interwoven by the melodic chorus". AllMusic's Stephen Thomas Erlewine wrote that "Waterfalls, "with its gently insistent horns and guitar lines and instantly memorable chorus, ... ranks as one of the classic R&B songs of the '90s."

Christine Werthman from Complex wrote that it "is drenched in water-droplet synth notes, live drums, rising horns, and a bass line that walks wherever it pleases." She noted that "it's a heavy song, but the warnings in the verses are buoyed by a rich, singable chorus, which certainly helped it get radio play." Jeff Benjamin of Fuse felt that the track was "far more than just another pop hit: The track told a cautionary tale of HIV and AIDS, and its video depicted a man who didn't wear a condom with his girlfriend and later watched his body degenerate in the mirror." Sputnikmusic's Butler asserted that "any list of the best singles of the 90s that does not include this in the top 15 — at least — is among the worst lists ever written." Australian music channel Max placed the song at No. 196 on their list of "1000 Greatest Songs of All Time" in 2012. In 2017, Paste ranked the song number two on their list of the 10 greatest TLC songs, and in 2022, The Guardian ranked the song number one on their list of the 20 greatest TLC songs. In October 2023, Billboard magazine ranked it among the "500 Best Pop Songs of All Time".

After Lopes' death in a car crash in La Ceiba, Honduras on April 25, 2002, the lyrics to her verse were engraved upon her casket.

== Accolades ==
=== Awards and nominations ===
Year	Organization	Award	Result
1995	MTV Europe Music Award	Best Song	Nominated
1995	MTV Video Music Award	Video of the Year	Won
1995	MTV Video Music Award	Best Group Video	Won
1995	MTV Video Music Award	Best R&B Video	Won
1995	MTV Video Music Award	Best Direction	Nominated
1995	MTV Video Music Award	Best Visual Effects	Nominated
1995	MTV Video Music Award	Best Art Direction	Nominated
1995	MTV Video Music Award	Best Editing	Nominated
1995	MTV Video Music Award	Best Cinematography	Nominated
1995	MTV Video Music Award	Viewer's Choice	Won
1995	MTV Video Music Award	Breakthrough Video	Nominated
1996	Grammy Award	Record of the Year	Nominated
1996	Grammy Award	Best Pop Performance by a Duo or Group with Vocals	Nominated
1996	Soul Train Music Awards	Best Song of the Year	Nominated
1996	Soul Train Music Awards	Best Video of the Year	Won
1996	Soul Train Music Awards	Best R&B/Soul Single – Group, Band or Duo	Won
1996	NAACP Image Awards	Outstanding Music Video	Won

=== Critic lists ===
"Waterfalls" on select critic lists
Publisher/critic	Year	Listicle	Rank
NME	1995	NME Writers' Top 50 Singles of 1995	10
Spin	1995	The 20 Best Singles of 1995	3
Blender	2005	The 500 Greatest Songs Since You Were Born	415
Bruce Pollock	2005	The 7,500 Most Important Songs of 1944–2000	No order
Entertainment Weekly	2009	The 100 Greatest Summer Songs	32
Complex	2012	The Best 90s R&B Songs	40
Max	2012	1000 Greatest Songs of All Time	196
Porcys	2012	100 Singli 1990–1999	42
Robert Dimery	2015	1,001 Songs You Must Hear Before You Die	No order
Billboard	2017	100 Greatest Girl Group Songs of All Time	10
Billboard	2019	Billboard's Top Songs of the '90s	29
Cleveland.com	2020	Best Billboard Hot 100 No. 1 Song of the 1990s	2
Glamour	2020	53 Best '90s Songs That Are All That and a Bag of Chips	37
BuzzFeed	2021	The 50 Best '90s Songs of Summer	3
Rolling Stone	2021	500 Greatest Songs of All Time	127
Time Out	2022	50 Best '90s Songs	10
Billboard	2023	Best Pop Songs of All Time	267
Forbes	2024	The 50 Best Songs of the 1990s	7
Time Out	2024	50 Best '90s Songs	5

== Track listings ==
- US 7-inch and cassette single

A. "Waterfalls" (single edit) – 4:19
B. "Waterfalls" (album instrumental) – 4:42

- US 12-inch single

A1. "Waterfalls" (single edit) – 4:19
A2. "Waterfalls" (DARP remix) – 4:27
A3. "Waterfalls" (album instrumental) – 4:42
B1. "Waterfalls" (ONP remix) – 4:34
B2. "Waterfalls" (ONP remix instrumental) – 5:19
B3. "Waterfalls" (acappella) – 4:05

- US, Australian, and Japanese CD single
1. "Waterfalls" (single edit) – 4:19
2. "Waterfalls" (ONP remix) – 4:34
3. "Waterfalls" (DARP remix) – 4:27
4. "Waterfalls" (album instrumental) – 4:42
- UK CD single
1. "Waterfalls" (no rap radio edit) – 3:32
2. "Waterfalls" (single version) – 4:19
3. "Waterfalls" (ONP remix) – 4:34
4. "Waterfalls" (DARP remix) – 4:27
5. "Waterfalls" (album instrumental) – 4:42
- UK 12-inch single

A1. "Waterfalls" (ONP remix) – 4:34
A2. "Waterfalls" (single version) – 4:19
B1. "Waterfalls" (DARP remix) – 4:27
B2. "Waterfalls" (album instrumental) – 4:42

- UK cassette single
1. "Waterfalls" (no rap radio edit) – 3:32
2. "Waterfalls" (DARP remix) – 4:27
- European CD single
1. "Waterfalls" (no rap radio edit) – 3:32
2. "Waterfalls" (ONP remix) – 4:34
- Australian cassette single

A1. "Waterfalls" (single edit)
A2. "Waterfalls" (DARP remix)
A3. "Waterfalls" (album instrumental)
B1. "Waterfalls" (ONP remix)
B2. "Waterfalls" (ONP remix instrumental)
B3. "Waterfalls" (album version)

== Charts ==
=== Weekly charts ===
Chart (1995–1996)	Peak position
Australia (ARIA)	4
Austria (Ö3 Austria Top 40)	3
Belgium (Ultratop 50 Flanders)	25
Belgium (Ultratop 50 Wallonia)	23
Canada Top Singles (RPM)	9
Canada Adult Contemporary (RPM)	16
Canada Dance/Urban (RPM)	4
Denmark (IFPI)	3
Europe (Eurochart Hot 100)	5
Europe (European Dance Radio)	2
Europe (European Hit Radio)	7
France (SNEP)	20
Germany (GfK)	5
Iceland (Íslenski Listinn Topp 40)	7
Ireland (IRMA)	4
Israel (IBA)	5
Netherlands (Dutch Top 40)	5
Netherlands (Single Top 100)	5
New Zealand (Recorded Music NZ)	1
Norway (VG-lista)	2
Scottish Singles Sales (Official Charts)	8
Sweden (Sverigetopplistan)	7
Switzerland (Schweizer Hitparade)	1
UK Singles (Official Charts)	4
UK Airplay (Music Week)	6
UK Dance (Official Charts)	17
UK Hip Hop/R&B (Official Charts)	1
US Billboard Hot 100	1
US Adult Contemporary (Billboard)	24
US Adult Pop Airplay (Billboard)	24
US Dance Singles Sales (Billboard)	10
US Hot R&B/Hip-Hop Songs (Billboard)	4
US Pop Airplay (Billboard)	2
US Rhythmic Airplay (Billboard)	1
US Cash Box Top 100	1
Zimbabwe (ZIMA)	1

Chart (2013)	Peak position
Japan Hot 100 (Billboard)	60

=== Year-end charts ===
Chart (1995)	Position
Australia (ARIA)	16
Belgium (Ultratop 50 Wallonia)	90
Brazil (Crowley)	32
Canada Top Singles (RPM)	79
Canada Dance/Urban (RPM)	49
Europe (Eurochart Hot 100)	24
Europe (European Dance Radio)	3
Europe (European Hit Radio)	27
France (SNEP)	86
Germany (Media Control)	38
Iceland (Íslenski Listinn Topp 40)	68
Netherlands (Dutch Top 40)	27
Netherlands (Single Top 100)	37
New Zealand (RIANZ)	2
Sweden (Topplistan)	53
Switzerland (Schweizer Hitparade)	26
UK Singles (OCC)	29
UK Airplay (Music Week)	24
US Billboard Hot 100	2
US Hot R&B Singles (Billboard)	16
US Top 40/Mainstream (Billboard)	7
US Top 40/Rhythm-Crossover (Billboard)	2
US Cash Box Top 100	6

Chart (1996)	Position
Australia (ARIA)	63

=== Decade-end charts ===
Chart (1990–1999)	Position
US Billboard Hot 100	19

=== All-time charts ===
Chart (1958–2018)	Position
US Billboard Hot 100	181

== Certifications ==
Region	Certification	Certified units/sales
Australia (ARIA)	Platinum	70,000^{^}
Canada (Music Canada)	Platinum	80,000^{‡}
Denmark (IFPI Danmark)	Gold	45,000^{‡}
Germany (BVMI)	Gold	250,000^{^}
New Zealand (RMNZ)	4× Platinum	120,000^{‡}
Norway (IFPI Norway)	Platinum	
United Kingdom (BPI)	2× Platinum	1,200,000^{‡}
United States (RIAA)	Platinum	1,200,000
^{^} Shipments figures based on certification alone.^{‡} Sales+streaming figures based on certification alone.

== Release history ==
Region	Date	Format(s)	Label(s)	Ref.
United States	May 29, 1995	7-inch vinyl; 12-inch vinyl; CD; cassette	LaFace	
United States	June 6, 1995	Contemporary hit radio	LaFace	
Sweden	July 10, 1995	CD	LaFace; Arista	
Japan	July 21, 1995	CD	LaFace	
United Kingdom	July 24, 1995	12-inch vinyl; CD; cassette	LaFace; Arista	
Australia	August 14, 1995	CD; cassette	LaFace	

== Bette Midler version ==
"Waterfalls"

Single by Bette Midler

from the album It's The Girls!
- Released: January 21, 2015
- Genre: Pop
- Length: 3:23
- Label: Warner Bros.; Eastwest
- Songwriters: Marqueze Etheridge; Lisa Lopes; Organized Noize
- Producers: Marc Shaiman; Scott Riesett

Bette Midler singles chronology
"Be My Baby" (2014)	"Waterfalls" (2015)	"One Fine Day" (2014)

"Waterfalls" was recorded by singer and actress Bette Midler for her fourteenth album, It's The Girls! (2014). The track was made into a ballad and has a much slower tempo and its production is stripped down with a piano and a soft drum beat echoing in the background. Midler's cover does not include the rap part of the song.

== Stooshe version ==
British girl band Stooshe recorded "Waterfalls" in November 2012. The band turned the track's rap, performed by Lisa Lopes, into a three-part harmony. A music video was released alongside the recording, which included a cameo from the two surviving members of TLC, Rozonda Thomas and Tionne Watkins. The music video featured Stooshe in a warehouse, standing on the top of a stage made of graffitied scaffolding. A group of modern and breakdancers performed below, acting out the storyline of the lyrics. Coloured water was used during the music video, and was sprayed over the set and dancers during the chorus of the song. Green Screen technology was also used on some of the lower scaffolding, to make it look like the graffiti was moving. Stooshe later "disowned" their cover of "Waterfalls", claiming that recording their version of the song was not their decision and "wasn't supposed to happen."

== In popular culture ==
The song was referred to in the film The Other Guys as one of many references to songs by TLC made by one of the characters. Thomas and Watkins rerecorded "Waterfalls" with Japanese pop and R&B singer Namie Amuro in 2013 for the song's twentieth anniversary. The song peaked at No. 12 on Japan's Hot 100 chart. That same year, the song was referred to in the film We're the Millers as Will Poulter performs Lopes's rap. The song also appears in the film's end credits. In 2015, the horror-comedy show Scream Queens featured the song in the pilot and is referred to numerous times in other episodes. It appears in the 2019 Marvel Studios film Captain Marvel, which is set in 1995, and in the 2009 film Couples Retreat.

== Bibliography ==
- The Billboard Book of Number 1 Hits (fifth edition)
