= 1995 MTV Video Music Awards =

Award ceremony

- Date: Thursday, September 7, 1995
- Location: Radio City Music Hall, New York, New York
- Country: United States
- Hosted by: Dennis Miller
- Most awards: TLC & Weezer (4)
- Most nominations: Michael Jackson & Janet Jackson (11)

Television/radio coverage
- Network: MTV
- Produced by: Andy Schuon
- Directed by: Bruce Gowers

The 1995 MTV Video Music Awards aired live on September 7, 1995, honoring the best music videos from June 16, 1994, to June 15, 1995. The show was hosted by Dennis Miller at Radio City Music Hall in New York City. David Sandlin was commissioned to design the program catalogue.

TLC and Weezer were the biggest winners of the night, with each taking home four awards. TLC's music video for "Waterfalls" won the two main awards of the night: Viewer's Choice Award and Video of the Year, becoming the first African-American act to win the latter award. Weezer's video for "Buddy Holly" took home the two main technical awards: Best Direction and Breakthrough Video. Meanwhile, the sibling pair of Michael and Janet Jackson was right behind both groups in terms of wins, as their video for "Scream" earned them three moonmen. Also Michael performed for over fifteen minutes to a medley of his main songs at the ceremony.

As mentioned above, TLC's "Waterfalls" won both Video of the Year and Viewer's Choice, becoming the third and last video to accomplish this feat in a single year. Ironically, this occurred on the first year that MTV decided to have different sets of nominees for these categories (as until 1994 the practice had been to have both categories have exactly the same set of nominees). The award for Breakthrough Video would end up having the same four nominees as Video of the Year in 1995, marking the only time this ever happened in VMA history.

In terms of nominations, the four videos and acts that were up for Video of the Year dominated the night. Michael and Janet Jackson's "Scream" was the most nominated video of the night, earning a grand total of eleven nominations, including a nomination in each of the seven professional categories. The night's big winner, TLC's "Waterfalls", was also the second most nominated video that night, earning ten nominations. Green Day's "Basket Case" came in third with nine nominations, while Weezer's "Buddy Holly" came in fourth with five nominations. There would not be a situation similar to this at the VMAs until the 2009 edition. In addition, all four videos were nominated for Best Direction.

== Background ==
MTV announced on February 28 that the 1995 Video Music Awards would be held at Radio City Music Hall for the second consecutive year on September 7. Nominees were announced at a press conference hosted by Rudy Giuliani and Michael Jackson on July 25. Dennis Miller was announced as host in late August. The ceremony broadcast was preceded by the 1995 MTV Video Music Awards Opening Act. Hosted by Kurt Loder and Tabitha Soren with reports from Chris Connelly, Juliette Hohnen, and Alison Stewart, the broadcast featured red carpet interviews, pre-taped features on a day with White Zombie and the filming of Mariah Carey's "Fantasy" music video (as well as the video's world premiere), a pre-taped interview with Bob Weir, and performances from Silverchair.

== Performances ==
List of musical performances
Artist(s)	Song(s)
Pre-show
Silverchair	"Tomorrow" "Pure Massacre"
Main show
Michael Jackson	Medley "Don't Stop 'Til You Get Enough" (sample) "The Way You Make Me Feel" (sample) "Scream" (sample) "Beat It" (with Vincent Price's laugh from "Thriller") "Black or White" (featuring Slash) "Billie Jean" "Dangerous" (with elements of "Smooth Criminal") "You Are Not Alone"
Live	"I Alone"
TLC	CrazySexy Medley "Ain't 2 Proud 2 Beg" "Kick Your Game" "Creep" "Waterfalls"
R.E.M.	"The Wake-Up Bomb"
Red Hot Chili Peppers	"Warped"
Bon Jovi	"Helter Skelter" "Something for the Pain" (Note: Live from Times Square)
Alanis Morissette	"You Oughta Know"
Hootie & the Blowfish	"Only Wanna Be with You"
Hole	"Violet"
Green Day	"Stuck with Me" (Note: Live "via spit-cam" from Stockholm)
White Zombie	"More Human than Human"

== Presenters ==
- Rod Stewart – presented Best Male Video
- Kennedy – appeared in commercial vignettes about the show
- Tim Robbins – introduced Live
- Patrick Swayze and Wesley Snipes – presented Best Video from a Film
- Bill Bellamy and Monica Seles – appeared in a pre-commercial vignette about previous Viewer's Choice winners and voting procedures
- Lenny Kravitz and Sheryl Crow – presented Best New Artist in a Video
- Chris Hardwick – interviewed New York Mayor Rudy Giuliani and First Lady Donna Hanover Giuliani and appeared in vignettes about the show and Viewer's Choice voting
- The Notorious B.I.G. and Bill Bellamy – presented Best Dance Video
- Kevin Bacon and Liv Tyler – presented Best Direction in a Video
- Grant Hill and Ricki Lake – presented Best R&B Video
- Natalie Merchant – introduced R.E.M.
- Kennedy and Claire Danes – appeared in a pre-commercial vignette about Viewer's Choice voting
- Madonna – presented Best Rap Video
- Mike Tyson – introduced the Red Hot Chili Peppers
- Drew Barrymore – presented the Michael Jackson Video Vanguard Award
- Seal and Des'ree (jokingly introduced by Dennis Miller as "Seal Koslowski" and "Desiree Finkelstein") – introduced the International Viewer's Choice Award winners
- VJs Anu Kottoor (Asia), Cuca Lazarotto (Brasil), Ingo Schmoll (Europe), Keiko Yamada (Japan), Alfredo Lewin (Latin America) and Schutze (Mandarin) – announced their respective region's Viewer's Choice winner
- George Clooney – presented Best Female Video
- Bryan Adams – presented Viewer's Choice
- Dennis Rodman and Christopher Walken – presented Best Alternative Video
- Bobby Brown and Whitney Houston – presented Video of the Year

== Winners and nominees ==
Nominees were selected by members of the music industry. Winners in all categories, except the Viewer's Choice awards, were selected by over 700 members of the music industry. Winners in the Viewer's Choice categories were selected by viewers, with the U.S. winner chosen via a phone poll conducted in the days prior to and during the ceremony.

Winners are in bold text.

Video of the Year	Best Male Video
**TLC – "Waterfalls"**; Green Day – "Basket Case"; Michael Jackson and Janet Jackson – "Scream"; Weezer – "Buddy Holly"	**Tom Petty – "You Don't Know How It Feels"**; Chris Isaak – "Somebody's Crying"; Elton John – "Believe"; Lucas – "Lucas with the Lid Off"
Best Female Video	Best Group Video
**Madonna – "Take a Bow"**; Des'ree – "You Gotta Be"; PJ Harvey – "Down by the Water"; Annie Lennox – "No More I Love You's"	**TLC – "Waterfalls"**; Green Day – "Basket Case"; The Rolling Stones – "Love Is Strong"; Stone Temple Pilots – "Interstate Love Song"
Best New Artist in a Video	Best Metal/Hard Rock Video
**Hootie & the Blowfish – "Hold My Hand"**; Jeff Buckley – "Last Goodbye"; Des'ree – "You Gotta Be"; Filter – "Hey Man, Nice Shot"; Portishead – "Sour Times (Nobody Loves Me)"	**White Zombie – "More Human than Human"**; Green Day – "Basket Case"; Meat Puppets – "We Don't Exist"; Stone Temple Pilots – "Interstate Love Song"
Best R&B Video	Best Rap Video
**TLC – "Waterfalls"**; Boyz II Men – "Water Runs Dry"; Michael Jackson and Janet Jackson – "Scream"; Jade – "5-4-3-2 (Yo! Time Is Up)"; Montell Jordan – "This Is How We Do It"	**Dr. Dre – "Keep Their Heads Ringin'"**; Brandy (featuring MC Lyte, Queen Latifah and Yo-Yo) – "I Wanna Be Down"; Da Bush Babees – "Remember We"; Craig Mack – "Flava in Ya Ear"; Public Enemy – "Give It Up"; Rappin' 4-Tay (featuring The Spinners) – "I'll Be Around"
Best Dance Video	Best Alternative Video
**Michael Jackson and Janet Jackson – "Scream"**; Paula Abdul – "My Love Is for Real"; C+C Music Factory – "Do You Wanna Get Funky"; Montell Jordan – "This Is How We Do It"; Madonna – "Human Nature"; Salt-n-Pepa – "None of Your Business"	**Weezer – "Buddy Holly"**; The Cranberries – "Zombie"; Green Day – "Basket Case"; Hole – "Doll Parts"; Stone Temple Pilots – "Interstate Love Song"
Best Video from a Film	Breakthrough Video
**Seal – "Kiss from a Rose" (from Batman Forever)**; Bryan Adams – "Have You Ever Really Loved a Woman?" (from Don Juan DeMarco); Jim Carrey – "Cuban Pete" (from The Mask); U2 – "Hold Me, Thrill Me, Kiss Me, Kill Me" (from Batman Forever); Urge Overkill – "Girl, You'll Be a Woman Soon" (from Pulp Fiction)	**Weezer – "Buddy Holly"**; Green Day – "Basket Case"; Michael Jackson and Janet Jackson – "Scream"; TLC – "Waterfalls"
Best Direction in a Video	Best Choreography in a Video
**Weezer – "Buddy Holly" (Director: Spike Jonze)**; Green Day – "Basket Case" (Director: Mark Kohr); Michael Jackson and Janet Jackson – "Scream" (Director: Mark Romanek); TLC – "Waterfalls" (Director: F. Gary Gray)	**Michael Jackson and Janet Jackson – "Scream" (Choreographers: LaVelle Smith Jr., Tina Landon, Travis Payne and Sean Cheesman)**; Paula Abdul – "My Love Is for Real" (Choreographers: Paula Abdul, Bill Bohl and Nancy O'Meara); Brandy – "Baby" (Choreographer: Fatima Robinson); Madonna – "Human Nature" (Choreographer: Jamie King); Salt-n-Pepa – "None of Your Business" (Choreographer: Randy Connor)
Best Special Effects in a Video	Best Art Direction in a Video
**The Rolling Stones – "Love Is Strong" (Special Effects: Fred Raimondi)**; Björk – "Army of Me" (Special Effects: BUF); Michael Jackson and Janet Jackson – "Scream" (Special Effects: Kevin Tod Haug, Alexander Frisch, Ashley Clemens, Richard 'Dr.' Baily, Jay Johnson and P. Scott Makela); TLC – "Waterfalls" (Special Effects: Peter Conn and Chris Mitchell)	**Michael Jackson and Janet Jackson – "Scream" (Art Director: Tom Foden)**; Madonna – "Take a Bow" (Art Director: Happy Massee); Jill Sobule – "I Kissed a Girl" (Art Director: Kelly Van Patter); TLC – "Waterfalls" (Art Director: Keith Burns)
Best Editing in a Video	Best Cinematography in a Video
**Weezer – "Buddy Holly" (Editor: Eric Zumbrunnen)**; Green Day – "Basket Case" (Editor: Alan Chimenti); Michael Jackson and Janet Jackson – "Scream" (Editor: Robert Duffy); Jill Sobule – "I Kissed a Girl" (Editor: Jerry Behrens); TLC – "Waterfalls" (Editor: Jonathan Silver)	**The Rolling Stones – "Love Is Strong" (Directors of Photography: Garry Waller and Mike Trim)**; Boyz II Men – "Water Runs Dry" (Director of Photography: Daniel Pearl); Green Day – "Basket Case" (Director of Photography: Adam Beckman); Michael Jackson and Janet Jackson – "Scream" (Director of Photography: Harris Savides); Stone Temple Pilots – "Interstate Love Song" (Director of Photography: Kevin Kerslake); TLC – "Waterfalls" (Director of Photography: Toby Phillips)
Viewer's Choice	International Viewer's Choice: MTV Asia
**TLC – "Waterfalls"**; Green Day – "Basket Case"; Hootie & the Blowfish – "Hold My Hand"; Michael Jackson and Janet Jackson – "Scream"; Live – "Lightning Crashes"; R.E.M. – "What's the Frequency, Kenneth?"	**Denada – "Sambutlah"**; Alisha – "Made in India"; Indus Creed – "Trapped"; Jetrin – "Love Train"; Kim Gun-mo – "Betrayed Love"
International Viewer's Choice: MTV Brasil	International Viewer's Choice: MTV Europe
**Os Paralamas do Sucesso – "Uma Brasileira"**; Barão Vermelho – "Daqui por Diante"; Marisa Monte – "Segue o Seco"; Nando Reis – "Me Diga"; Skank – "Te Ver"; Viper – "Coma Rage"	**U2 – "Hold Me, Thrill Me, Kiss Me, Kill Me"**; Björk – "Army of Me"; Clawfinger – "Pin Me Down"; The Cranberries – "Zombie"; Oasis – "Whatever"
International Viewer's Choice: MTV Japan	International Viewer's Choice: MTV Latin America
**Chage and Aska – "Something There"**; Hal from Apollo '69 – "Sweet Thing"; The Mad Capsule Markets – "HI-SIDE (High-Individual Side)"; Towa Tei – "Technova"; TRF – "Overnight Sensation"	**Café Tacuba – "La Ingrata"**; Fito Páez – "Circo Beat"; Santana – "Luz Amor y Vida"; Todos Tus Muertos – "Mate"; Los Tres – "Déjate Caer"
International Viewer's Choice: MTV Mandarin	
**Faye Wong – "Chess"**; Dou Wei – "The Black Dream"; Dadawa – "Sister Drum"; Tracy Huang – "Spring"; Xin Xiao Qi – "Understanding"
Michael Jackson Video Vanguard Award
**R.E.M.**

== Artists with multiple wins and nominations ==
Artists who received multiple awards
Wins	Artist
4	TLC
4	Weezer
3	Janet Jackson
3	Michael Jackson
2	The Rolling Stones

Artists who received multiple nominations
Nominations	Artist
11	Janet Jackson
11	Michael Jackson
10	TLC
9	Green Day
5	Weezer
4	Madonna
4	Stone Temple Pilots
3	The Rolling Stones
2	Björk
2	Boyz II Men
2	Brandy
2	Des'ree
2	Hootie & the Blowfish
2	Montell Jordan
2	Paula Abdul
2	Salt-n-Pepa
2	Jill Sobule
2	The Cranberries
2	U2

== Music Videos with multiple wins and nominations ==
Music Videos that received multiple awards
Wins	Artist	Music Video
4	TLC	"Waterfalls"
4	Weezer	"Buddy Holly"
3	Michael Jackson & Janet Jackson	"Scream"
2	The Rolling Stones	"Love Is Strong"

Music Videos that received multiple nominations
Nominations	Artist	Music Video
11	Michael Jackson & Janet Jackson	"Scream"
10	TLC	"Waterfalls"
9	Green Day	"Basket Case"
5	Weezer	"Buddy Holly"
4	Stone Temple Pilots	"Interstate Love Song"
3	The Rolling Stones	"Love Is Strong"
2	Björk	"Army of Me"
2	Boyz II Men	"Water Runs Dry"
2	Des'ree	"You Gotta Be"
2	Hootie & the Blowfish	"Hold My Hand"
2	Jill Sobule	"I Kissed a Girl"
2	Madonna	"Human Nature"
2	Madonna	"Take a Bow"
2	Montell Jordan	"This Is How We Do It"
2	Paula Abdul	"My Love Is for Real"
2	Salt-n-Pepa	"None of Your Business"
2	The Cranberries	"Zombie"
2	U2	"Hold Me, Thrill Me, Kiss Me, Kill Me"

== See also ==
- 1995 MTV Europe Music Awards
