= Tionna T. Smalls =

Tionna Tee Smalls
- Born: September 16, 1984 (age 41)
- Origin: Brooklyn, New York, U.S.
- Occupations: Author, TV personality
- Years active: 2007–present

Tionna Tee Smalls (born September 16, 1984) is an American author, media personality, relationship advisor, youth advocate and star of VH1's reality television series What Chilli Wants.

== Early life and education ==
Smalls grew up in a two-parent household along with three sisters and was raised in the East New York section of Brooklyn, New York. After completing her primary education, Tionna attended the High School for Environmental Studies in Manhattan and studied sociology at Stony Brook University.

== Professional career ==
In 2007, Smalls released her first book with IUniverse publishers, a self-service publishing company entitled “Girl Get Your Mind Right,” a book that encourages women to focus on the realities of dating and how to deal with members of the opposite sex. Following the success of the book an updated version was released in 2010 after Smalls signed a new book deal with HarperCollins publishing.

The book became popular after Smalls’ promoted it to Gawker Media and she was later hired as a writer in 2008 to provide relationship advice to readers. This occurred after receiving an influx of attention as a result of an email that Smalls wrote in third person to the editors of the magazine asking them to review her book. Her popular column “Ask Tionna” received around 20,000 views weekly. Smalls became an instant internet hit and an increase of fan base and book sales followed.

At the conclusion of Smalls position at Gawker, she moved to Radar Online and was later hired by an online column with SLC Outsider, which was run by self-professed Gawker fan, Adam Streeter. “Her contribution to SLC Outsider earned her mention in the New York Times on January 13, 2008 with an article titled, “Has Gawker Jumped the Snark” written by Allan Saulkin.” In 2007, Smalls started her own urban lifestyle blog entitled Talk Dat Ish. She also started her internet radio show, Talk Dat Ish Radio, on Blog Talk Radio.

“In 2009 VH1 approached Tionna with an opportunity to be a relationship expert to Rozonda “Chili” Thomas on the reality series “What Chilli Wants.” Smalls’ fiery personality and experience with giving relationship advice around the country was a big hit with viewers.” The show was produced by Fremantle Media North and aired on April 11, 2010 on VH1. Smalls is the owner of Loveys Accessories Boutique in Brooklyn New York and part owner of Majesty’s Closet, an online boutique that emphasizes plus size fashion, with her sister Antonia “Toni” Reason. The boutique is named after Reason's daughter and Smalls’ Niece “Majesty.”

Tionna released her second major book, “Men Love Abuse”, through her publishing company Talk Dat Ish Books in January 2012. Smalls’ “tell it like it is” demeanor in the world of relationships and dating encourages women to be more firm with men and not to have a too nice approach. “It wouldn't be a bad idea for women to have something to keep themselves busy.” says Smalls to Sonya Eskridge in an interview with S2S Magazine. "Working towards your goals is sexy and that means that sometimes your man may have to wait for a minute. Never let a man have too much access to you", she suggests.

Smalls recently finished her first screenplay, is in development for her own dating reality show, and building her Talk Dat Ish brand by signing new authors to her publishing company and helping new talent enter into the entertainment business. Her new book, “You Gotta Lose to Win” will be released this summer.

Smalls is the host of MTV's Girl Get Your Mind Right, a show in which she helps young women find love while finding themselves.
