= Way Back (TLC song) =

Single by TLC featuring Snoop Dogg

from the album TLC
- Released: April 14, 2017
- Genre: G-funk; R&B
- Length: 3:47; 3:05 (no rap edit); 4:26 (extended/video version)
- Label: 852 Musiq; Cooking Vinyl
- Songwriters: Tionne "T-Boz" Watkins; James Abrahart; Calvin Broadus; Dernst Emile II (extended version)
- Producer: D'Mile

TLC singles chronology
"Joy Ride" (2016)	"Way Back" (2017)	"DO IT! (AGAIN!)" (2025)

Snoop Dogg singles chronology
"Point Seen Money Gone" (2016)	"Way Back" (2017)	"Mount Kushmore" (2017)

Music video
- "Way Back" on YouTube

"Way Back" is a song by American girl group TLC, featuring Snoop Dogg, from their fifth and final studio album, TLC (2017). An ode to the group's fanbase since their beginnings in 1991, it was released as the third and final single on April 14, 2017, by newly formed label 852 Musiq and UK-based independent record company Cooking Vinyl. The song was written by group member Tionne Watkins and James Abrahart alongside Snoop Dogg and was produced by D'Mile, who also wrote the middle-8 section on the extended version.

== Background and promotion ==
On April 12, 2017, TLC announced on Twitter, "Tune into @BBNcrew tomorrow @ 12PM EST to get the first listen of our new single, Way Back. Can't wait to share it with you! #TLCgoeswayback". "Way Back" premiered on April 13 via the Internet radio service iHeartRadio.

== Critical reception ==
Billboard described the song as having a "G-funk, R&B groove". Time stated in an article, "The pair gifted us an extra-special throwback bop for the weekend in the form of the brand-new track "Way Back," a smooth, groovy tune that marks their first release in a whopping 15 years."

== Music video ==
TLC went on Big Boys Neighborhood to promote the single and announced a contest that would allow a few lucky fans to be extras in the video. The lucky fans were selected on April 19, 2017 via Facebook and given specific instructions for the following morning.

The music video was shot in North Hollywood, California on April 20, 2017 from 7:00AM to 10:00PM. The fans that were selected are all featured as back up dancers in the dance scene around the blue convertible car during the chorus. The video uses the extended version of the song.

The video was released on June 6, 2017 and was met with positive reviews and gained 2 million views on YouTube in 48 hours.

== Track listing ==
Explicit digital download
No.	Title	Length
1.	"Way Back" (featuring Snoop Dogg)	3:47

Digital download – album
No.	Title	Length
1.	"Way Back" (featuring Snoop Dogg) (extended mix)	4:26

== Chart performance ==
In the United States, "Way Back" debuted at number twenty-eight on the Billboard Adult R&B Songs chart on May 6, 2017. The song entered the top ten in its eleventh week.

== Charts ==
=== Weekly charts ===
Chart (2017)	Peak position
US Adult R&B Songs (Billboard)	8
US R&B/Hip-Hop Airplay (Billboard)	35

=== Year-end charts ===
Chart (2017)	Position
US Adult R&B Songs (Billboard)	26

== Release history ==
Country	Date	Format	Label	Ref.
United Kingdom	April 14, 2017	Digital download — explicit	Cooking Vinyl	
Japan	April 28, 2017	Digital download — explicit	852 Musiq	
Various	June 30, 2017	Digital download — extended version (as part of the TLC album)	Cooking Vinyl	
