= Rozonda Thomas =

American singer, dancer and actress

Rozonda Ocelean Thomas
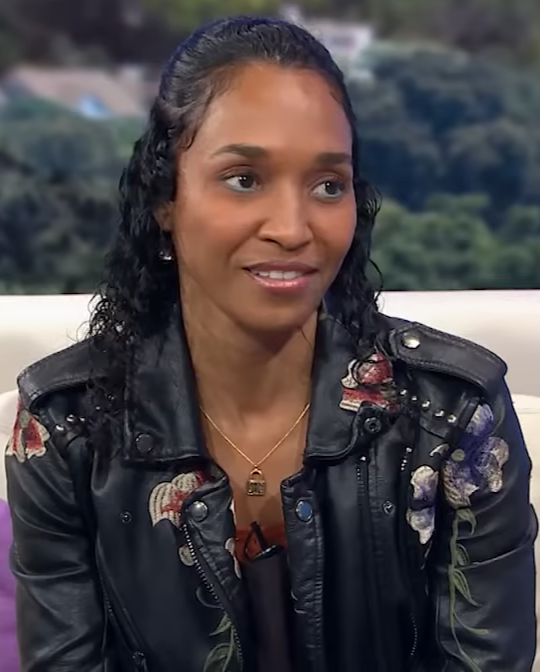
- Thomas in 2019
- Born: 1970 or 1971 (age 55–56); Columbus, Georgia
- Other name: Chilli
- Occupations: Singer; actress; television personality
- Musical career
- Genres: R&B; pop; hip hop soul; new jack swing; funk
- Years active: 1991–present
- Labels: LaFace; Arista; Epic
- Member of: TLC

Rozonda Ocelean Thomas, also known by her stage name Chilli, is an American singer, dancer and actress who is a member of the group TLC, one of the best-selling girl groups of the 1990s.

== Early life ==
Thomas was born in Columbus, Georgia. She later moved to Atlanta to be with her mother and graduated from Benjamin Elijah Mays High School in 1989. Her father, Abdul Ali, is of Indian Bengali and Arab descent, (Note: He is a descendant of Moksad Ali, a Bengali Muslim trader from Hooghly who immigrated to the United States before the partition of India and married an African American woman, Ella Blackman. Among their children was the entertainer Bardu Ali.) while her mother, Ava Thomas, is of African American and Native American descent.

Thomas, who had been raised by her mother, later allowed the Sally Jessy Raphael television talk show to air footage of her meeting her father for the first time in 1996, when she was 25. When she was a child, she began attending the Seventh-day Adventist Church with her great-grandmother, whom she called Big Mama.

== Music career ==
=== 1991–present: TLC ===
Thomas was first a dancer for Damian Dame. In 1991, she joined TLC, replacing founding member Crystal Jones, and was nicknamed "Chilli" by Lisa Lopes so that the group could retain the name TLC. The group went on to sell over 65 million records worldwide and became the best-selling American girl group of all-time; only the Spice Girls had sold more. Chilli has won four Grammy Awards for her work with TLC.

In the spring of 1995, Thomas appeared and participated in the track "Freedom (Theme from Panther)" first appeared on the soundtrack to Melvin Van Peebles' movie Panther as TLC, along with SWV, Xscape, En Vogue, Jade, Brownstone and others.

Since the death of group member Lisa "Left Eye" Lopes in April 2002, Thomas and Tionne "T-Boz" Watkins have occasionally performed as a duo. In 2009, Thomas and Watkins performed a series of concerts in Asia.

In late 2011, VH1 announced plans to produce a biopic on TLC to air in 2013. Thomas and Watkins signed on as producers. Actress and singer Keke Palmer portrayed Thomas in CrazySexyCool: The TLC Story.

In 2019, Thomas lost her voice and was ordered by doctors not to sing. TLC then had to cancel their singing for the California State Fair and the Stanislaus State Fair.

=== Solo career ===
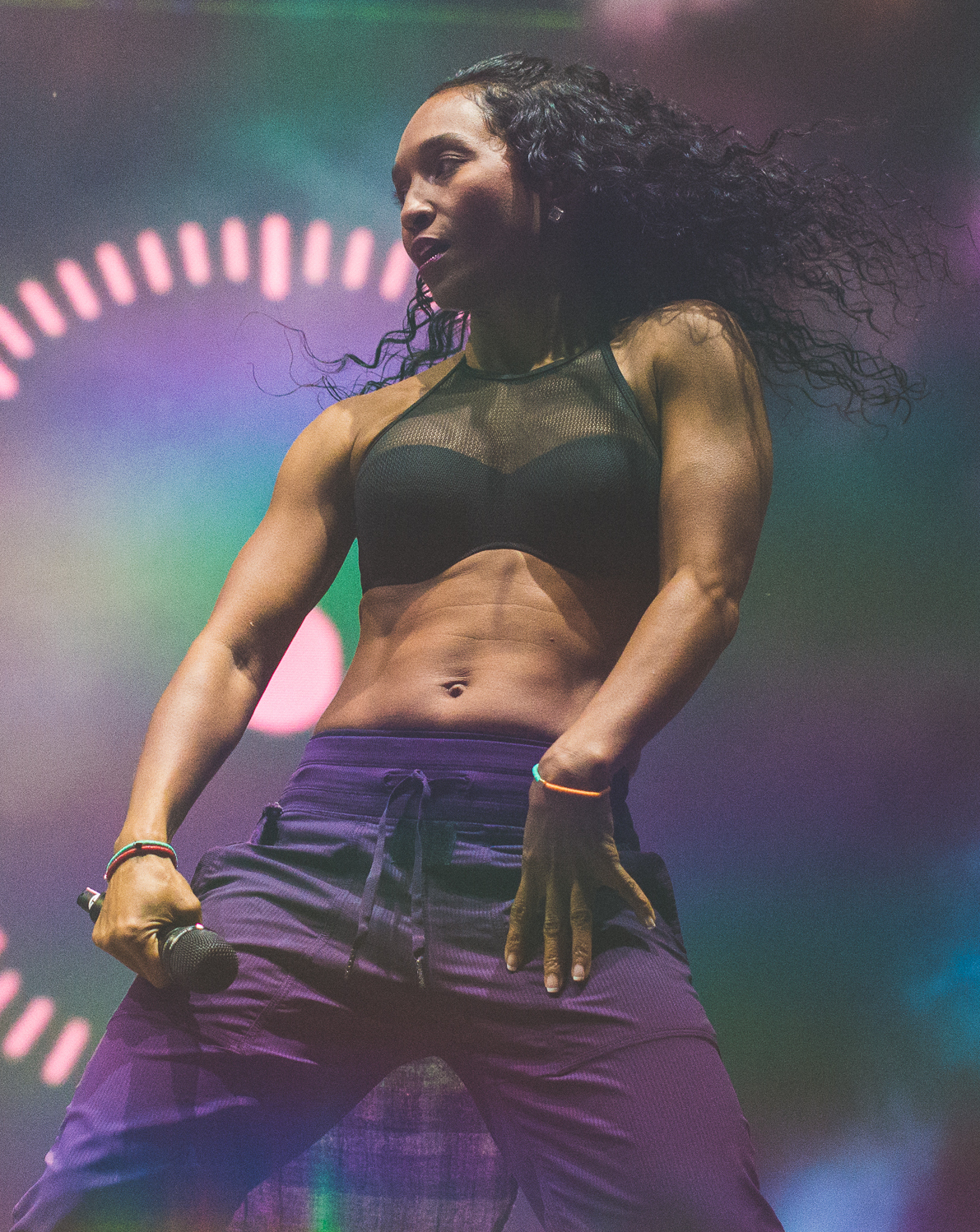
Thomas performing as a part of TLC in 2016

Thomas began working on a solo album in 2000 after the completion of promotion for TLC's third album, FanMail (1999). She paused production when work began on the next TLC album, 3D (2002). In 2006, it was reported that she had signed with Akon's record label Konvict Muzik and that her debut album would be released the following year, but this never came to fruition. In early April 2008, Thomas's first official solo single, "Dumb, Dumb, Dumb" was released. In 2012, she performed a track called "Flirt" on a second season episode of Single Ladies.

In January 2016, she released the single "Body", which served to promote her fitness workout campaign.

== Acting and television roles ==
Thomas has made guest appearances on television shows such as The Parkers, That 70s Show, Living Single and Strong Medicine. In 1992, she had a brief cameo in the music video for "Jump" by Kris Kross. In 2000, she was featured in the made-for-television movies A Diva's Christmas Carol and Love Song (with close friend Monica), and in the film Snow Day. In 2001, she co-starred in the action film Ticker, directed by Albert Pyun. She also played a small role in House Party 3 and the 1997 film Hav Plenty.

In 2005, Thomas and Watkins starred in the reality series R U the Girl. In June 2009, VH1 announced the airing of a reality TV series starring Thomas. The series, What Chilli Wants, which documents Thomas's quest to find love and manage her life with the help of love and relationship expert Tionna Tee Smalls, premiered on April 11, 2010. The second season of What Chilli Wants premiered on January 2, 2011. In 2011, Thomas made cameo appearances throughout the first season of VH1's Single Ladies. In 2012, Thomas appeared as the leading lady in R&B singer Tyrese's music video for his single "Nothing On You".

In 2013, Thomas became a member of "Team Guy" on the second season of Food Network's Rachael vs. Guy: Celebrity Cook-Off. She appeared naked in a PETA anti-circus ad campaign. Thomas also appeared on episode 14 of WWE Countdown where she spoke about The Rock. Thomas was later a judge for truTV's reality series Fake Off, which premiered on October 27, 2014.

In 2017, she portrayed Zora Neale Hurston in Marshall, a biographical film about the life of Thurgood Marshall.

As of January 1, 2026, she and Matthew Lawrence are the co-hosts of Second Chance Love, a television reality series on Hallmark+.

== Personal life ==
At age 20, Thomas became pregnant by producer Dallas Austin. Due to career aspirations and outside pressures, she aborted the pregnancy. She later revealed that she regretted the decision. Thomas and Austin continued their relationship and later had a son born on June 2, 1997.

In 2001, Thomas began dating Usher, after she starred in his music videos for "U Remind Me", "U Got It Bad", and "U Don't Have to Call". Their relationship ended in 2003.

In late 2022, Thomas began dating actor Matthew Lawrence. The pair went public with their relationship in January 2023.

On March 4, 2024, Thomas became a grandmother after her son's wife gave birth to a daughter.

Thomas is a member of the Granite Bay Seventh-day Adventist Church.

== Political affiliation ==
In 2026, public Federal Election Commission (FEC) records revealed that Thomas made multiple donations to Republican and Donald Trump‑affiliated political action committees during the 2024 election cycle. A series of 17 contributions, totaling approximately US$1,000, were made to WinRed, the Trump National Committee JFC, and Never Surrender Inc. The discoveries prompted allegations that Thomas supported the MAGA movement. Thomas responded with an Instagram video and statement, declaring, "I am not MAGA", and explaining that she had intended the contributions to support causes against human trafficking and for veterans, not to endorse a political agenda.

Around the same time, Thomas briefly shared a social‑media post containing a debunked transphobic conspiracy theory about former First Lady Michelle Obama; she removed the post after backlash and said the repost had been accidental, stating she had "the utmost respect and admiration" for Obama. News outlets also reported that Thomas's Instagram activity included "likes" of posts by conservative figures, including Representative Byron Donalds.

Separately, Georgia voter registration records showed that a voter named Rozonda Ocelean Thomas, with an address linked to the singer, participated in a Republican primary election in March 2016, although that individual's subsequent general‑election votes (2016, 2018, 2020, 2022, 2024) were listed without party affiliation.

In her public statements, Thomas emphasized that she did not support policies "causing great harm to the American people" and noted that she had previously voted for and donated to Barack Obama's campaigns and supported Michelle Obama's Let's Move! initiative.

== Other ventures ==
Thomas and the other members of TLC were big proponents of encouraging safe sex. For the music video of the song, "Ain't 2 Proud 2 Beg" Thomas and her band members wore condoms on their clothing. In 2003, Thomas and Watkins teamed up with Agouron Pharmaceuticals to create a national education program about HIV/AIDS. The program supplied people with information about HIV/AIDS, including prevention and treatment.

In 2013, Thomas took a stand against cyberbullying after her son was a victim. The gossip site MediaTakeOut.com targeted Thomas's son because of his apparel and questioned his sexuality. In response, Thomas created a petition through change.org to get the article deleted from the site and to stop staff members from gossiping about minors entirely. In her petition, she described what cyberbullying is and statistics about some of the victims. The site ended up removing the article and issuing an apology to her son.

In 2018, Thomas became the face of DAYO casual wear.

== Discography ==
=== Singles ===
- "Dumb Dumb Dumb" (2008)
- "Body" (2016)

== Filmography ==
=== Film ===
Year	Title	Role	Notes
1994	House Party 3	Sex As A Weapon	Credited as TLC
1997	Hav Plenty	Kris	
2000	Snow Day	Mona	
2000	Love Song	House Director	TV movie
2000	A Diva's Christmas Carol	Marli Jacob	TV movie
2001	Ticker	Lilly McCutcheon	
2017	Marshall	Zora Neale Hurston	

=== Television ===
Year	Title	Role	Notes
1992	CBS Schoolbreak Special	1st Rapper as TLC	Episode: "Words Up!"
1992	Out All Night	Herself as TLC	Episode: "Pilot"
1992	Showtime at the Apollo	Herself as TLC	Episode: "#6.12"
1995	Living Single	Herself	Episode: "The Following Is a Sponsored Program"
1999	Ultra Sound	Herself (as TLC)	Episode: "TLC: You've Got Mail"
1999	Behind the Music	Herself	Episode: "TLC"
2001	Top Ten	Herself	Episode: "Girl Bands"
2003	That '70s Show	Hot Nurse	Episode: "You Shook Me"
2003	Born to Diva	Judge	TV series
2004	The Parkers	Kai	Episode: "She's Positive"
2004	Strong Medicine	Amber Steele	Episode: "Touched by an Idol"
2004	Behind the Music	Herself	Episode: "TLC: The Final Chapter"
2005	R U the Girl	Herself/hostess	TV series
2009	Black to the Future	Herself	Segment: The Most Groovetastic Songs
2010	Undateable	Herself	Episode: "Hour 2" & "Hour 5"
2010-11	What Chilli Wants	Herself	Main cast
2011-12	Single Ladies	Herself	Recurring cast: season 1, guest: season 2
2013	Rachael vs. Guy: Celebrity Cook-Off	Herself / Contestant	Main cast: season 2
2013	Guy's Big Bite	Herself	Episode: "Soup's On, Chill Out"
2014	The Millionaire Matchmaker	Herself	Episode: "Chilli and Jeff Ogden"
2016	Lip Sync Battle	Herself as TLC	Episode: "Zoe Saldana vs. Zachary Quinto"
2017	Party Legends	Herself	Episode: "Beating Arsenion Hall in the Chest Repeatedly"
2018	Martha & Snoop's Potluck Dinner Party	Herself	Episode: "Spicing it Up"
2019	Girls Cruise	Herself	Main cast

== Book ==
Bald, Vivek (2013). Bengali Harlem and the Lost Histories of South Asian America. Harvard University Press. ISBN 978-0-674-06666-3.
