= Scout Niblett discography =

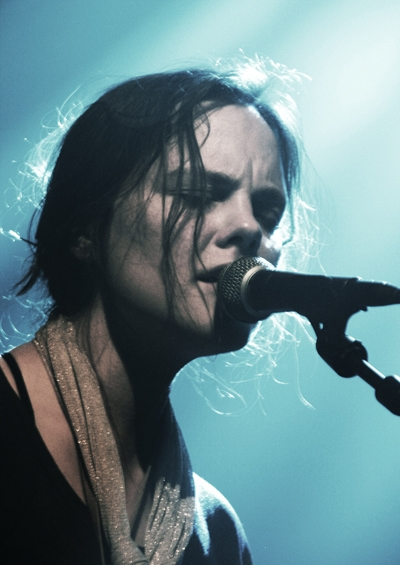
- Niblett performing at Grand Mix, France, 2008.
- Studio albums: 6
- EPs: 1
- Singles: 12
- Miscellaneous: 5

The following is a comprehensive discography of Scout Niblett, an English indie rock singer-songwriter. Niblett has released six studio albums, beginning in 2001.

== Studio albums ==
Year	Album information	Formats
2001	Sweet Heart Fever: Released: 9 October 2001; Label: Secretly Canadian	CD, LP
2003	I Am: Released: 2 September 2003; Label: Secretly Canadian	CD, LP
2005	Kidnapped by Neptune: Released: 10 May 2005; Label: Too Pure	CD, LP
2007	This Fool Can Die Now: Released: 15 October 2007; Label: Too Pure	CD, LP
2010	The Calcination of Scout Niblett: Released: 26 January 2010; Label: Drag City	CD, LP
2013	It's Up to Emma: Released: 21 May 2013; Label: Drag City	CD, LP

== Extended plays ==
Year	EP information	Formats	Notes
2002	I Conjure Series EP: Released: 21 January 2003; Label: Secretly Canadian	CD, 10"	10" is single-sided

== Singles ==
Year	Song	Album	Label	Formats	Notes
2002	"Whoever You Are Now / Shining Burning"	Non-album single	Secretly Canadian	7"	
2003	"I'll Be A Prince"	I Am	Too Pure	7"	
2003	"Drummerboy / Blossom"	I Am	Too Pure	7"	
2004	"Uptown Top Ranking"	Non-album single	Too Pure	CD, 7"	
2005	"Kidnapped by Neptune"	Kidnapped by Neptune	Too Pure	7"	
2005	"Scout Niblett"	Kidnapped by Neptune	Too Pure	CD	Features "Kidnapped by Neptune" with b-sides "Ruler of My Heart" and "Hot, Hotter, Hottest"
2007	"Just Do It / Dinosaur Egg"	This Fool Can Die Now	Too Pure	CD, 7"	Limited edition CD
2007	"Kiss"	This Fool Can Die Now	Too Pure	CD, 7"	
2009	"It´s Time My Beloved"	Non-album single	Drag City	7"	
2010	"The Calcination of Scout Niblett"	The Calcination of Scout Niblett	Drag City	CD	Limited edition
2013	"No More Nasty Scrubs"	It's Up to Emma	Drag City	7"	Covers of "Nasty" by Janet Jackson (side A), and "No Scrubs" by TLC (side B)

== Split singles ==
Year	Single	Other artist	Label	Formats	Notes
2001	"Lioness/Miss My Lion"	Songs:Ohia	Secretly Canadian	7"	Limited edition pressing; "Miss My Lion" was later re-recorded for Sweet Heart Fever

== Miscellaneous appearances ==
Year	Song	Album	Notes
2004	"Wet Road"	The Golden Apples of the Sun	Track originally released on Sweet Heart Fever
2004	"Trudy Dies"	I Am a Cold Rock, I Am Dull Grass: A Tribute to Will Oldham	
2006	"Valvoline"	Rough Trade Shops: Counter Culture, Vol. 2	Track originally released on Kidnapped by Neptune
2006	"I Want Candy/I Know What Boys Want/Who Do You Love/Not Fade Away"	Graciously: A Gulf Relief Compilation	Collaboration with Howe Gelb
2009	"I Wanna Love"	Loving Takes This Course: A Tribute to the Songs of Kath Bloom	
