= FanMail Tour =

1999–2000 concert tour by TLC

- Tour by TLC
- Promotional poster for tour
- Associated album: FanMail
- Start date: October 22, 1999
- End date: January 29, 2000
- Legs: 2
- No. of shows: 33 in North America

TLC concert chronology
- 1995 Budweiser Fest Tour (1995); FanMail Tour (1999–2000); Japan and Malaysia tour (2010)

The FanMail Tour is the debut headlining tour by American group TLC. The tour support their third studio album, FanMail. The tour visited North America with dates later planned for Japan and Europe. However, the international dates after the second North American leg were cancelled.

== Background ==
Most dates of the tour were sold out and the group would perform all the hits from throughout their career. The tightly choreographed concert featured a five-piece band, seven dancers, cybertechnics, and a giant-screen android named "Virtual Vic-E". On September 27, 1999, TLC donated an exclusive track entitled "I Need That" to MP3.com, that the fans could download from the company's website for free. In exchange, MP3.com sponsored the tour and donated ten cents to the Sickle Cell Disease Association each time the song was downloaded.

At the time, TLC had to address the incessant rumors that they were breaking up. Lisa Lopes told the New York Daily News, "A lot of people are under the impression that I'm leaving the group. That's not the case..." She also added, "The magic of the group has everything to do with the chemistry between myself, Tionne [Watkins] and Chilli [Rozonda Thomas]...with TLC, it's like, if there wasn't something going wrong, it just wouldn't be right." The tour wrapped up in their hometown of Atlanta, a day prior to Super Bowl XXXIV. Mayor Bill Campbell gave the group a key to the city and declared January 29, "TLC Day". On March 18, 2000, the group had a PayPerView special of the full live show in Atlanta, called TLC: Sold Out.

Shortly after the Atlanta show, all three members were offered $25 million to extend the tour into Europe and Japan, but backed out of it when Lopes instead requested time off to visit Honduras and to work on her debut solo album, Supernova. Even though Watkins and Thomas were unhappy with her decision, they reluctantly agreed to pass on the extension.

A few performances from their concert at MCI Center, Washington, D.C., on January 23, 2000, have later been included on their Japanese compilation TLC 20: 20th Anniversary Hits (2013).

== Concert synopsis ==
The show was divided into five acts plus an encore. It began with a futuristic theme and an introduction by the giant screen android, "Virtual Vic-E", welcoming the audience to the show. After the video ends, all three members rise from the stage, each in different silver clothing to perform "FanMail" as well as "Silly Ho" and "If They Knew". The backup dancers wore purple raincoats and pants. The first leg of the tour featured the girls wearing butterfly-themed outfits, but they were quickly replaced with the silver outfits for unknown reasons. After the end of "If They Knew", Lopes revealed a bag of mail received from fans in the city, and promised that she and the other members would read through it later in the show.

The show continued with the Ooooooohhh... On the TLC Tip era, in which the members performed "Ain't 2 Proud 2 Beg", "What About Your Friends" and "Baby-Baby-Baby", dressed in white overalls surrounded with multi-colored spray paint in homage to their early image. Lopes also wore large pink sunglasses and a pacifier around her neck.

Shortly before the beginning of the CrazySexyCool era, Vic-E detected an intruder backstage. The intruder, a man in a black hooded costume, revealed himself as an evil villain. He spotted the bag of fanmail and proceeded to steal it, leaving the band and the backup dancers too later to stop him. However, they barely had any time to mull it over, when TLC returned to perform "Creep" shortly after, unaware of the theft, with Lopes, Watkins and Thomas wearing silk pajamas, very similar to the ones they wore in the "Creep" music video. The backup dancers also wore pajamas. Lopes and Thomas each had their own platform on both ends of the stage, while Watkins was in the middle of the main stage. All girls were eventually on the main stage to perform Lopes' rap. Right after the song, "Red Light Special" followed, which again featured Lopes and Thomas on their separate platforms, but instead sitting on a chair and Watkins on the main stage. Several female dancers also sat on chairs, dancing seductively.

The solos of each member followed shortly after the dance interlude of "Housequake", starting with Left Eye, performing an unreleased rap entitled "Crazy". She also did several magic tricks and played the keyboard. Then followed Chilli's solo, dressed as a cowgirl to perform "Come on Down". She was also accompanied by several female dancers also dressed as cowgirls. After the song, she was then lowered down the main stage. She re-emerged wearing a new costume which she, along with the rest of the members, then wore until the end of the concert. She would then pick a man from the audience and begin to perform "I Miss You So Much" with the man sitting on a chair and Chilli singing to him. T-Boz was last to perform her solo, appearing on stage dressed in a purple suit with a wooden cane to sing the first lines of the famous military march chant, "I Don't Know (But I Been Told)". She would then remove her suit to reveal a costume similar to Chilli's during the performance of "I Miss You So Much", to sing "If I Was Your Girlfriend", "Touch Myself" and" Dear Lie".

After the girls' solos was Act 4, entitled Rain. "Unpretty" was the first song of the act, which featured many children from the audience who came up to sing with them. "I'm Good at Being Bad", "My Life" and a salsa version of "Shout" were performed after.

Act 5 commenced with Lopes finally noticing the missing bag of fanmail, and the group were informed by the band and the audience that the evil villain took it. Disappointed, the girls would turn to Vic-E, who would explain that the letters would not reveal the full strength of the bond between TLC and the fans, and assure the audience that TLC loves them. The girls then performed their signature song, "Waterfalls". The giant screen showed clips from the music video and water running. Backup dancers wore different colored shirts.

During the last show of the tour in Atlanta, Goodie Mob made a special appearance to perform their song with TLC, "What It Ain't (Ghetto Enuff)". "No Scrubs" was the final song of the show, which had Watkins and Lopes on the end platforms of the stage and Thomas on the main stage, with a dancer trying to give his number to her. They would all eventually end up back on the main stage together to perform Left Eye's rap on the song. Just as the song was ending, the bag of fanmail returned. There was a note attached to it from the evil villain, apologising for the theft, and explaining that he had written to them hundreds of times and they never wrote back. He reveals that he bought some T-shirts as an apology gift and placed them in the bag. The girls proceeded to hand out the T-shirts to the audience and to thank the crowd. All backup dancers then joined hands with Lopes, Watkins and Thomas to end the show.

== Critical reception ==
The tour received very positive reviews from critics. Natalie Nichols of the Los Angeles Times described the Anaheim show as: "...a thoroughly 21st century pop concert, with all the razzle-dazzle and sense of fun you'd expect [...] TLC delighted fans while underscoring the staying power that has made it the best-selling female trio in history [...] a seven-piece band managed to stay out of the way, playing TLC's blend of soul, hip-hop, funk and pop with surprising verve...However, this was one modern multi-platinum act that had plenty of meat to match the sizzle".

Darryl Morden of The Hollywood Reporter described the New York City show as "smart, sexy, stylish, sweet, daring, dazzling and diverse, the 100-minute performance Friday night was full of flash but grounded in personal charisma. Effects and gimmickry took a back seat to old-fashioned, engaging showmanship".

Variety's Troy Augusto described it as "an exciting evening of singing and dancing that delivered all of their hit songs in charming fashion".

Gene Stout of the Seattle Post-Intelligencer added, "Pent-up demand for the Atlanta-based trio's incendiary blend of pop, hip-hop and R&B made the evening a celebration."

However, Craig Seymour of Entertainment Weekly states, "...there were occasional signs of the strife that has divided Lisa "Left Eye" Lopes from her bandmates Rozonda 'Chilli' Thomas and Tionne 'T-Boz' Watkins. At various points during the show, Chilli and T-Boz high-fived each other while ignoring Left Eye. Left Eye, in turn, strutted past the other two as if they were merely set pieces to avoid. Things heated up during a particularly aggressive rendition of 'What About Your Friends' when T-Boz appeared to glare at Left Eye while singing the lyrics, What about your friends/Will they let you down/Will they be around?”.

== Opening Acts ==
- Ricky J (North America, 1999, 1st Leg)
- Jodie Resther (North America, 1999, 1st Leg)
- Destiny's Child (North America, 1999, 1st Leg)
- K-Ci & JoJo (North America, 1999, 1st Leg)
- Ideal (North America, 1999, 1st Leg)
- Marc Nelson (North America, 1999, 1st Leg)
- Blaque (North America, 2000, 2nd Leg)
- Christina Aguilera (North America, 2000, 2nd Leg)

== Set list ==
Act I: The Future

1. "Vic-E" (intro)
2. "FanMail" (includes "The Vic-E Interpretation Interlude")
3. "Silly Ho"
4. "If They Knew"

Act II: Back to the TLC Tip

5. "Ooooooohhh... On the TLC Tip" (interlude)
6. "Ain't 2 Proud 2 Beg"
7. "What About Your Friends"
8. "Baby-Baby-Baby"

Act III: CrazySexyCool

9. "The Villain" (interlude)
10. "Creep" (Salsa Dance Remix)
11. "Red Light Special" (includes "Housequake" interpretation)
12. "Crazy" (Left Eye solo)
13. "Sexy" (interlude)
14. "Come on Down" (Chilli solo)
15. "I Miss You So Much" (Chilli solo)
16. "Cool" (interlude)
17. "Touch Myself" (includes elements of "Back That Azz Up" & "Nasty Girl") (T-Boz solo)
18. "If I Was Your Girlfriend" (T-Boz solo)
19. "Dear Lie" (T-Boz solo)

Act IV: Rain

20. "Unpretty"
21. "I'm Good at Being Bad"
22. "My Life"
23. "Shout" (Remix)
24. "Waterfalls"

Encore

25. "No Scrubs"

== Tour dates ==
Date	City	Country	Venue
North America
October 22, 1999	Toronto	Canada	Air Canada Centre
October 23, 1999	Montreal	Canada	Molson Centre
October 25, 1999	Ottawa	Canada	Corel Centre
October 27, 1999	Grand Rapids	United States	Van Andel Arena
October 29, 1999	Fairborn	United States	Nutter Center
October 31, 1999	Baltimore	United States	Baltimore Arena
November 2, 1999	Greenville	United States	BI-LO Center
November 5, 1999	Raleigh	United States	Raleigh Entertainment & Sports Arena
November 7, 1999	Hampton	United States	Hampton Coliseum
November 9, 1999	Toledo	United States	Savage Hall
November 12, 1999	Hartford	United States	Hartford Civic Center
November 13, 1999	Providence	United States	Providence Civic Center
November 15, 1999	Albany	United States	Pepsi Arena
November 16, 1999	Cleveland	United States	Gund Arena
November 18, 1999	Cleveland	United States	CSU Convocation Center
November 20, 1999	Pittsburgh	United States	Civic Arena
November 22, 1999	Milwaukee	United States	Bradley Center
November 26, 1999	Minneapolis	United States	Target Center
November 28, 1999	St. Louis	United States	Kiel Center
December 1, 1999	Houston	United States	Compaq Center
December 3, 1999	Phoenix	United States	America West Arena
January 3, 2000	San Diego	United States	San Diego Sports Arena
January 5, 2000	Oakland	United States	The Arena in Oakland
January 7, 2000	Anaheim	United States	Arrowhead Pond of Anaheim
January 8, 2000	Oakland	United States	The Arena in Oakland
January 10, 2000	Seattle	United States	KeyArena
January 11, 2000	Portland	United States	Rose Garden
January 16, 2000	Auburn Hills	United States	The Palace of Auburn Hills
January 20, 2000	Boston	United States	FleetCenter
January 21, 2000	New York City	United States	Madison Square Garden
January 23, 2000	Washington, D.C.	United States	MCI Center
January 25, 2000	Philadelphia	United States	First Union Center
January 27, 2000	Sunrise	United States	National Car Rental Center
January 29, 2000	Atlanta	United States	Philips Arena

Cancellations and rescheduled shows

October 12, 1999	Winnipeg, Canada	Winnipeg Arena	Cancelled
October 15, 1999	Montreal, Canada	Molson Centre	Rescheduled to October 23, 1999
October 16, 1999	Toronto, Canada	Air Canada Centre	Rescheduled to October 22, 1999
October 21, 1999	Greenville, South Carolina	BI-LO Center	Rescheduled to November 2, 1999
October 23, 1999	Sunrise, Florida	National Car Rental Center	Cancelled
October 27, 1999	Raleigh, North Carolina	Dorton Arena	Rescheduled to November 5, 1999, and moved to the Raleigh Entertainment & Sports Arena
October 29, 1999	Auburn Hills, Michigan	The Palace of Auburn Hills	Cancelled
October 31, 1999	Philadelphia, Pennsylvania	First Union Center	Cancelled
November 3, 1999	Pittsburgh, Pennsylvania	Civic Arena	Rescheduled to November 20, 1999
November 5, 1999	Uniondale, New York	Nassau Veterans Memorial Coliseum	Cancelled
November 7, 1999	Cleveland, Ohio	Gund Arena	Rescheduled to November 18, 1999, and moved to the CSU Convocation Center
November 9, 1999	Boston, Massachusetts	FleetCenter	Cancelled
November 14, 1999	Washington, D.C.	MCI Center	Cancelled
November 18, 1999	Cincinnati	Firstar Center	Cancelled
November 20, 1999	Milwaukee, Wisconsin	Bradley Center	Rescheduled to November 26, 1999
November 24, 1999	Indianapolis, Indiana	Market Square Arena	Moved to the Conseco Fieldhouse
November 24, 1999	Indianapolis, Indiana	Conseco Fieldhouse	Cancelled
November 26, 1999	Rosemont, Illinois	Allstate Arena	Cancelled
November 30, 1999	St. Charles, Missouri	Family Arena	Cancelled
December 4, 1999	Las Vegas, Nevada	MGM Grand Garden Arena	Rescheduled to December 5, 1999
December 5, 1999	Las Vegas, Nevada	MGM Grand Garden Arena	Cancelled
December 6, 1999	Tacoma, Washington	Tacoma Dome	Cancelled
December 9, 1999	Los Angeles	Staples Center	Cancelled
December 11, 1999	Oakland, California	The Arena in Oakland	Cancelled
December 15, 1999	Houston, Texas	Compaq Center	Rescheduled to December 1, 1999
December 16, 1999	New Orleans, Louisiana	New Orleans Arena	Cancelled
December 18, 1999	Charlotte, North Carolina	Charlotte Coliseum	Cancelled
December 19, 1999	Atlanta, Georgia	Philips Arena	Cancelled
January 14, 2000	Rosemont, Illinois	Allstate Arena	Cancelled
January 18, 2000	Cleveland, Ohio	CSU Convocation Center	Cancelled
February 27, 2000	Nagoya, Japan	Nagoya Rainbow Hall	Cancelled
March 1, 2000	Osaka, Japan	Osaka-jō Hall	Cancelled
March 2, 2000	Osaka	Osaka-jō Hall	Cancelled
March 4, 2000	Yokohama, Japan	Yokohama Arena	Cancelled
March 6, 2000	Tokyo, Japan	Yoyogi National Gymnasium	Cancelled
March 8, 2000	Tokyo, Japan	Yoyogi National Gymnasium	Cancelled
March 12, 2000	Cologne, Germany	Kölnarena	Cancelled
March 13, 2000	Rotterdam, Netherlands	Rotterdam Ahoy	Cancelled
March 15, 2000	Birmingham, England	National Indoor Arena	Cancelled
March 16, 2000	London, England	Wembley Arena	Cancelled
March 18, 2000	Dublin, Ireland	Point Theatre	Cancelled

== Personnel ==
Band

- Dallas Austin – keyboards
- Thomas Martin – guitars
- Thomas Knight – drums, percussion
- Ethan Farmer – bass
- Eric Daniels – keyboards, musical director
- Christopher Rupert – drums, percussion

Choreographer

- Devyne Stephens

Dancers

- Oththan Burnside
- Jamaica Craft
- Ray Johnson
- Aakomon Jones
- Shannon Lopez
- Dean Pagtakhan
- Kevin White

Production manager

- Jason Scianno
- Tanya Greenblatt

Wardrobe and stylist

- Julieanne Mijares
- Laurie Chang (assistant stylist)

Tour production manager

- Dale "Opie" Skjerseth

Stage designer

- Lisa "Left Eye" Lopes
