= FanMail =

1999 studio album by TLC

Studio album by TLC
- Released: February 23, 1999
- Recorded: April–December 1998
- Studios: D.A.R.P. (Atlanta) (Note: Tracks 1–5, 7, 9, 11 and 13–17); The Enterprise (Burbank, California) (Note: Tracks 1, 11 and 15; vocals on track 6); Flyte Tyme (Edina, Minnesota) (Note: Track 6); Record Plant (Hollywood) (Note: Vocals on track 6); Brandon's Way (Hollywood) (Note: Tracks 8 and 13); Silent Sound (Atlanta) (Note: Track 8); Doppler (Atlanta); Krosswire (Atlanta) (Note: Track 10); Riversound (Lithonia, Georgia) (Note: Tracks 11 and 15)
- Genres: R&B; pop
- Length: 63:31
- Labels: LaFace; Arista
- Producers: Dallas Austin; Babyface; Kevin "She'kspere" Briggs; Cyptron; Jermaine Dupri; Jimmy Jam and Terry Lewis; Debra Killings; Ricciano Lumpkins; Daryl Simmons

TLC chronology
CrazySexyCool (1994)	FanMail (1999)	3D (2002)

Singles from FanMail
- 1. "No Scrubs" Released: February 2, 1999; 2. "Unpretty" Released: May 17, 1999; 3. "Dear Lie" Released: December 6, 1999

FanMail is the third studio album by American girl group TLC, released on February 23, 1999, by LaFace and Arista Records. The album title is a tribute to TLC's fans who sent them fan mail during their hiatus. FanMail debuted at number one on the US Billboard 200, selling 318,000 copies in its first week of release, and spent five weeks at number one.

To promote the album, TLC embarked on their first concert tour titled the FanMail Tour. FanMail received acclaim from most music critics, who praised its innovative sound and themes. The album received eight nominations at the 42nd Annual Grammy Awards, including one for Album of the Year, winning three. It has been certified six-times platinum by the Recording Industry Association of America (RIAA), and has sold 10 million copies worldwide. FanMail is TLC's second-best-selling album after their 1994 studio album CrazySexyCool.

Released following a period of uncertainty marked by financial difficulties and disputes with their record label and among group members, FanMail reaffirmed TLC's commercial viability. The album's incorporation of technological themes and futuristic production has been credited with helping to reshape the sound of R&B at the turn of the 21st century. TLC were among the first mainstream artists to aestheticize the internet in their music, and FanMail is regarded as an early precursor to the direct artist-to-fan interaction that would later become common in the era of social media. It was the group's final album released in Lisa "Left Eye" Lopes' lifetime before she died on April 25, 2002, as she was killed in a car crash prior to the release of their fourth studio album 3D (2002).

== Background ==
After filing for Chapter 11 bankruptcy on July 3, 1995, the group went on a recording hiatus. The suit was eventually settled on November 25, 1996. Preliminary work on their third studio album was delayed when friction arose between the group and their main producer Dallas Austin, who was at the time dating member Rozonda "Chilli" Thomas, and helped to raise their son Tron. Austin wanted $4.2 million and creative control on the project, resulting in a stand-off between him and the group. TLC eventually entered recording studios in April 1998 to start work on their then-untitled third album with Austin, who returned with a handshake agreement. While he contributed the most to the album and served as the executive producer, they also collaborated with long-term producers Babyface and L.A. Reid, as well as with Kevin "She'kspere" Briggs, Jimmy Jam and Terry Lewis. FanMail was initially scheduled for release on November 10, 1998, but was delayed to the first quarter of 1999.

Lisa "Left Eye" Lopes wrote and composed eight songs for the album, all of which Austin rejected, stating that they were "inferior". Consequently, Lopes told MTV News in July 1998 that she decided to work on a solo album assisted by Erick Sermon. The album was planned to be released before FanMail, further causing tension among the group. During an interview with Vibe in 1999, Lopes publicly derided her involvement in TLC, remarking: "I've graduated from this era. I cannot stand 100 percent behind this TLC project and the music that is supposed to represent me. This will be my last interview until I can speak freely about the truth and present myself on my solo project."

== Recording and production ==
During the recording of FanMail, the group were offered many songs that would eventually be recorded by other artists such as 702's "Where My Girls At?" (1999), Whitney Houston's "Heartbreak Hotel" (1998), and Britney Spears' "...Baby One More Time" (1998). Thomas stated that the group considered recording each track but were worried that it did not represent them well. Tionne "T-Boz" Watkins reiterated Thomas' reasoning in an interview with MTV News, stating that "...Baby One More Time" was not good for them despite appreciating and respecting Spears' decision to record it. Each member received at least one songwriting credit throughout FanMail.

Watkins decided to begin writing poetry to deal with her emotions after being in and out of hospital due to sickle cell disease. She took her collection of poems to Austin, who helped her adapt one into the song "Unpretty", while another was adapted by Babyface into "Dear Lie". While writing and recording "I'm Good at Being Bad" in Minneapolis, Watkins had been inspired by grunge band Nirvana's loud and soft dynamic shifts in their discography, and wanted to create a song in a similar style for TLC. Jam encouraged her to hum the melody while he played the beat in the recording booth, which was unlike her usual process of listening to the beat and writing out the lyrics. She stated that the technique influenced her as a songwriter. She sought to have Lopes rap the pre-chorus herself, but Lopes insisted that Watkins' thicker voice should be used for the track. Watkins also contributed to writing two more songs for the album, co-writing "If They Knew" and "Shout" with Austin and Lopes. Two of the album's tracks, "Come on Down" and "I Miss You So Much", were originally written for Watkins to sing lead. However, she decided that Thomas would be more suited as the lead vocalist after attempting to record them. During the recording of the latter, Thomas was suffering from a sinus infection. She asked to re-record the song the next week despite it being near the album's deadline, but Babyface decided that the vocal take she had recorded would be suitable for the final version. "No Scrubs" was one of the final tracks recorded for the album. It was originally written by Kandi Burruss, Tameka Cottle, and Briggs for the former two artists to record together as part of the girl group Xscape. However, Austin persuaded Briggs to give the song to TLC as their first single for FanMail, with Thomas singing the lead vocals. Austin further emphasized that it was a breakthrough for her, as he believed that she was more capable than being relegated to a secondary vocalist.

== Composition ==
FanMail took on a new, futuristic style, due to the rapid advancement in technology heading into the new millennium such as the Y2K bug and Napster. This was effectively portrayed in the album's most popular song "No Scrubs" along with the music video, which embraces a modern emphasis on female strength and independence. The album contains several tracks featuring vocals by the computer modulated voice Vic-E, a talking android which is reminiscent of the "tour guide" on A Tribe Called Quest's 1993 studio album, Midnight Marauders. Initially, the android was created through the Macintosh's greeting voice as a replacement for Lopes, as she refused to work with the group. However, once she reconciled with them, she approved of the android and decided to include it on the album as a character.

FanMail is an R&B and pop album, that includes tracks featuring funk, hip hop-inspired dance-pop, and ballads. Several producers were involved in the album's production, including Dallas Austin, Babyface, Jermaine Dupri, Jimmy Jam, and Terry Lewis. Throughout 17 tracks, TLC brought up issues of sexuality, insecurities, self-reliance, and vulnerability with resistant messaging. It fused elements of "new jill swing" and sounds created from a Roland TR-808, to form a "cyber-R&B masterpiece". On the first track "FanMail", Austin used multiple samples from the internet and movies in order to create a "space sound" that "will sound like what the album cover looks like". The background noise consisting of typewriters and printers was incorporated to represent the fan letters and fan mail, while Austin added a sample from an interview with Lopes commenting "all these conflicting fan mail", and created a hook with it. The song consisted of a sneaking bassline, vocal stutters, and glitches similar to that of dial-up Internet. However, in contrast to the album's dominating technological sound, "Unpretty" is an alternative pop song that describes the insecurity caused by body-shaming. The song was inspired by a poem written by Watkins. "Communicate (Interlude)" establishes the connection between the thoughts and feelings of people nearby through technology. The lyrics from the song, "There's over a thousand ways/ To communicate in our world today/ And it's a shame/ That we don't connect" describe the lack of interaction between humans, which in turn has increased the rate of depression among adolescents. It combines the typing of a keyboard in the background with Left Eye's vocals, "will you communicate with me?".

== Artwork, packaging, and title ==
The FanMail cover featured a custom font design, and cover art with decode-able binary code which included images of the TLC members in metallic skin tones. The photographer, Dan Levy, shot the silver-painted group members without any digital alterations. Writing for i-D, Annie Lord described the members on the cover as "three digitised [sic], disembodied cyborgs from another dimension", and compared the binary code across their faces to The Matrix. The CD insert folds out to form a large poster featuring a picture of the three TLC members and the names of thousands of people who sent them fan mail throughout their career. A limited edition of the album was released, which had an insert with a lenticular version of the cover placed in front of the original booklet in the jewel case.

The album title is a tribute to TLC's fans after their five-year hiatus. It came from Lopes, who also coined the group's first two album titles Ooooooohhh... On the TLC Tip and CrazySexyCool, and initially wanted to name the album Fan2See. She stated to the group, "let's write and sing one big fan letter. Let's put fan names on everything – all the singles, the album cover, T-shirts, mugs. Just show our appreciation".

== Promotion ==
=== Singles ===
"FanMail", "Silly Ho", "I'm Good at Being Bad", and "My Life" served as promotional singles for the album. Those songs charted on the US Billboard R&B/Hip-Hop Songs.

"No Scrubs" was the official lead single and topped the US Billboard Hot 100 for four consecutive weeks, becoming TLC's biggest commercial success in years. It also ranked at number two on Billboard's Year-End Hot 100 of 1999.

Follow-up single "Unpretty" also topped the Billboard Hot 100, spending three weeks at number one and placing at number 20 on the Year-End Hot 100.

Originally, "Shout" was planned to be a single in the United States, while "Dear Lie" would be a single internationally, but only the latter would end up being released as a single with an accompanying music video. It peaked at number 51 on the Billboard Hot 100.

=== Tour ===
TLC embarked on the FanMail Tour to promote the album. It was their first headlining tour, and their first tour in five years. As part of a sponsorship with MP3.com, the group released "I Need That", with proceeds sent to the Sickle Cell Disease Association of America. The song was described by the producer Rico Lumpkins as "more R&B than hip-hop". The stage and costumes were all designed by each TLC member. The FanMail Tour became the highest-grossing tour by a girl group, as it grossed over $72.8 million. It was the final tour with all three members together.

== Critical reception ==
Professional ratings
Review scores
Source	Rating
AllMusic	4/5 stars
Entertainment Weekly	B−
The Guardian	3/5 stars
Los Angeles Times	3.5/4 stars
Muzik	4/5 stars
NME	8/10
Q	4/5 stars
Rolling Stone	3.5/5 stars
Spin	6/10
USA Today	3.5/4 stars

Upon release, FanMail received acclaim from most music critics, many of whom regarded it as TLC's most progressive project to date. Reviewers also complimented the album's sound and lyrics for addressing complex themes in a catchy, mainstream manner.

Writing for Muzik, Tony Farsides stated that FanMail was "a real grower" in comparison to other albums released during the time. NME writer Roger Morton compared the album's "cyber concept" to Prince's electronic funk discography and opined that TLC were not diminished by other girl groups such as Honeyz, All Saints, and the Spice Girls.

Ann Powers of Rolling Stone opined that elements of FanMail were "fragmented" despite sounding more "sharper [and] aggressive" than CrazySexyCool, but praised the TLC members for taking "brave" risks. Writing for AllMusic, Stephen Thomas Erlewine noted that the group were attempting to imitate the production of CrazySexyCool although he noted the album's versatility. Los Angeles Times staff writer Marc Weingarten negatively stated that the vocals were "wispy [and] flat", and that all members were "severely limited singers". However, he commented that the album's production managed to overpower their vocals with "sinewy beats and startling arrangements".

David Browne of Entertainment Weekly criticized TLC's "startlingly faceless and homogeneous" vocals and opined that FanMail was an "endless parade of hooks" without the essence of R&B. He acknowledged that their vocals were typical of some R&B artists in the 1990s who "warble in the same half-asleep murmur" and lamented that the genre is "curiously dispassionate". Writing for Spin, Joshua Clover stated that the album was "a burning, physical message that looks like a spectacle but reads like sexual politics" and criticized the producers for attempting to resemble Timbaland's production.

== Commercial performance ==
In the United States, FanMail debuted at number one on the Billboard 200 and the Top R&B/Hip-Hop Albums charts with 318,000 copies sold in its first week, becoming TLC's first number-one album on both charts. On June 21, 2000, it was certified six-times platinum by the Recording Industry Association of America (RIAA). According to Nielsen SoundScan, the album had sold 4.8 million copies in the United States as of July 2017; it had sold an additional 877,000 copies through the BMG Music Club as of February 2003. Internationally, the album reached the top 10 in New Zealand, Canada, and the United Kingdom. As of February 2019, FanMail has sold over 10 million copies worldwide.

== Legacy ==
FanMail marked a return to form for TLC, following a turbulent hiatus from recording music that included a highly publicized period of financial struggles, record label disagreements, and internal conflict among group members. Although it did not replicate the commercial success of CrazySexyCool, FanMail further cemented TLC's status as one of the most influential girl groups of all-time, and nevertheless established them as the best-selling female musical act in the United States. According to Preezy Brown of Revolt, its success proved their longevity as the preeminent R&B girl group of the 1990s, "bookend[ing] one of the dominant runs we’ve seen in music over the past quarter-century and stamped TLC as modern-day legends". In a BBC Radio 1 listener poll, FanMail was voted the 17th best album of the 1993-2003 decade.

The album is credited with helping to reshape the sound of R&B upon the turn of the 21st century. Its production, which incorporated futuristic and electronic sounds, influenced the genre's shift towards a more technology-inspired style, consequently introducing other sub-genres of R&B. Music journalist Suzy Exposito said the album "would serve as a blueprint for a new, digitally-savvy generation of genre-defying musicians". With the album's release, TLC were among the first artists to adopt a soundscape and aesthetic inspired by the country's fascination with and fear of the new millennium, the internet, and Y2K, with Julianne Escobedo Shepherd of Complex declaring them "the most accurately prescient of any of the musicians" who donned metallic outfits. According to Natelegé Whaley of Vibe, it "proved that TLC was more in tune with the future than their pop peers". Rated R&B's Danielle Brissett agreed that it "launched them into a space that most female R&B groups had yet to experience", while allowing them to compete alongside the likes of emerging R&B girl groups such as 702, Blaque, and Destiny’s Child by releasing music that sounded different than theirs. Apple Music said the album maintains relevance despite its retrofuturism, writing, "there isn't a better snapshot of where things were headed around the turn of the millennium".

Music publications have discussed the impact of the album's themes. Apple Music said the project "delivered some of R&B's most timeless empowerment anthems and channeled the future with remarkable prescience". Similarly, Nick C. Levine of Dazed said in 2019 that the album's themes about self-preservation and self-worth continue to resonate. In response, TLC has received an outpouring of support from both established and new fans during and decades after the album's release, who wrote to them sharing their own struggles with body image and other issues. Whaley believes the record's defiance granted women "permission to be vocal about the spectrum of their emotions", particularly via its most popular single, "No Scrubs". In addition to introducing the term "scrub" into the public's lexicon, the song had been sampled on over 37 songs by 2019. A reviewer for Sputnikmusic crowned the album "THE female urban album of our generation to evoke integrity in women, and companionship with their special someone", which they found deserving of TLC's recognition in the history books. In retrospect, some critics have admitted that certain aspects of FanMail sound outdated. However, Kish Lal of Junkee noted that although FanMail may contain dated production elements, its thematic substance and overarching messages remain timeless compared to offerings from other contemporary artists attempting Y2K-inspired pop at the time. Shepherd noted that the "weightless" production that characterized FanMail had fallen out of fashion but already resurged by 2014.

Because of its title and tracks that directly address fans, several reporters have noted that the album positioned TLC as early adopters of digital fan engagement in a pre-social media era, with both Chilli and T-Boz frequently interacting with their fans online. Lindsay Zoladz of Pitchfork reported that because FanMail is often overlooked in favor of its immediate predecessor, CrazySexyCool, fans fail to realize that the album is responsible for "a whole crop of web-minded, Tumblr-savvy, android-obsessed artists". Zoladz argues that FanMail explores the isolating effects of being constantly connected; she sees this theme reflected across contemporary media, from Drake's Take Care (2011) to The Social Network (2010) and Girls (2012-2017), all of which similarly grapple with the emotional toll of digital life. Lal said in 2019 "The disconnect that TLC emanates in FanMail has trickled into the lives of everyone on social media", while i-D's Annie Lord said TLC "predicted internet anxiety". The album has been cited as an influence on the works of female R&B artists in particular, namely Destiny’s Child, SZA, H.E.R., and Summer Walker. In 2019, Brissett credited the album's success with helping launch a Black music movement "that went against the norm" and "has a heavy presence today". FanMail was the final album TLC released comprising their original trio, becoming the last album they recorded with Lopes prior to her death in 2002. Double J contributor Sose Fuamoli said that, even when removed from Lopes's legacy, FanMail's "importance at the end of the 90s is untouchable".

== Track listing ==
No.	Title	Writer(s)	Producer(s)	Length
1.	"FanMail"	Dallas Austin	Cyptron	3:59
2.	"The Vic-E Interpretation – Interlude"	Austin	Cyptron	0:18
3.	"Silly Ho"	Austin	Cyptron	4:15
4.	"Whispering Playa – Interlude"	Austin; Marshall Lorenzo Martin	Austin	0:52
5.	"No Scrubs"	Kevin Briggs; Kandi Burruss; Tameka Cottle	Kevin "She'kspere" Briggs	3:34
6.	"I'm Good at Being Bad"	James Harris III; Terry Lewis; Tony Tolbert; Tionne "T-Boz" Watkins; Lisa Lopes; Martin; Morris Dickerson; Charles Miller; Sylvester Allen; Harold Brown; Howard Scott; Lee Oskar; Leroy Jordan	Jimmy Jam and Terry Lewis	5:39
7.	"If They Knew"	Austin; Ricciano Lumpkins; Lopes; Martin; Watkins	Austin; Lumpkins	4:04
8.	"I Miss You So Much"	Babyface; Daryl Simmons	Babyface; Simmons	4:56
9.	"Unpretty"	Austin; Watkins	Austin	4:38
10.	"My Life"	Jermaine Dupri; Tamara Savage; Lopes; Martin	Dupri; Carl So-Lowe^{[a]}	4:01
11.	"Shout"	Austin; Lopes; Martin; Watkins	Austin	3:57
12.	"Come On Down"	Diane Warren	Austin; Debra Killings	4:17
13.	"Dear Lie"	Babyface; Watkins	Babyface	5:10
14.	"Communicate – Interlude"	Austin	Austin	0:51
15.	"Lovesick"	Austin; Rozonda Thomas	Austin	3:52
16.	"Automatic"	Austin	Austin	4:31
17.	"Don't Pull Out on Me Yet"	Austin	Austin; Briggs^{[b]}	4:33

Japanese edition bonus track
No.	Title	Writer(s)	Producer(s)	Length
18.	"U in Me"	Austin	Austin	3:50

=== Digital download track ===
- "I Need That" – 3:52
  - Released online by TLC exclusively on MP3.com to promote the FanMail Tour. Produced by Rico Lumpkins for PWPX, LLC. Written by R. Lumpkins, L. Lopes, and S. Chunn. Left Eye's rap was later expanded and re-recorded on the track "Gimme Some" from Toni Braxton's album The Heat, as well as being completely reused and shortened on the track "Whoop De Woo" from the compilation Now and Forever: The Hits, originally intended for the group's fourth album 3D.

Notes

- ^{^[a]} signifies a co-producer
- ^{^[b]} signifies an additional vocal producer

Sample credits

- "FanMail" contains an excerpt from an MTV interview that features the instrumental of TLC's song "Diggin' on You" in the background.
- "I'm Good at Being Bad" contains elements from "Slippin' into Darkness" by War. The song also originally contained interpolated lyrics from "Love to Love You Baby" by Donna Summer, but the interpolated lyrics were later removed on later pressings of the explicit version.
- On initial pressings of the album, "Whispering Playa – Interlude" contained a sample of "Cold Blooded" by Rick James playing in the background. The sample was removed on subsequent editions, with TLC's song "U in Me" being played in the background instead.
- "Automatic" contains portions from Neil Armstrong's "Moon Landing" speech.

== Personnel ==
Credits adapted from the liner notes of FanMail.

=== Musicians ===
- Dallas Austin – arrangements (tracks 1, 3, 7, 9, 11, 12, 15–17); gang vocals (tracks 3, 11)
- T-Boz – background vocals (tracks 1, 11, 13, 16); gang vocals (track 3)
- Chilli – background vocals (tracks 1, 5, 8, 11, 16)
- Debra Killings – background vocals (tracks 1, 3, 5, 7–13, 15–17); bass (tracks 9, 12, 17)
- Rick Sheppard – MIDI, sound design (tracks 1, 3, 9, 11, 15, 17)
- Vic-E – speech (track 2); rap (track 3)
- Leslie Brathwaite – gang vocals (tracks 3, 11)
- Ty Hudson – gang vocals (tracks 3, 11)
- Joi Gilliam – gang vocals (track 3)
- Peach – gang vocals (track 3)
- Sonji – gang vocals (track 3)
- Carolyn Paige – gang vocals (track 3)
- Kevin Wales – gang vocals (track 3)
- "Big" Stan Smith – gang vocals (track 3)
- Papi – playa (track 4)
- Kandi Burruss – background vocals (track 5)
- Tameka "Tiny" Cottle – background vocals (track 5)
- She'kspere – MIDI, sound design (track 5)
- Jimmy Jam and Terry Lewis – arrangements, all other musical instruments (track 6)
- Mike Scott – guitar (track 6)
- Alex Richbourg – drum programming (track 6)
- Jerry Lumpkins – additional keyboards (track 7)
- Babyface – drum programming, acoustic guitar (tracks 8, 13); keyboards, electric guitar (track 13)
- Greg Phillinganes – piano (track 8); Wurlitzer (track 13)
- Michael Thompson – acoustic guitar (track 8); electric guitar (track 13)
- C.C. Thomas – bass (track 8)
- Necia Bray – background vocals (track 8)
- Tomi Martin – guitar (tracks 9, 17)
- Tom Knight – drums (track 9)
- LaMarquis Jefferson – bass (track 10)
- Marde Johnson – gang vocals (track 11)
- Koko Watkins – gang vocals (track 11)
- Solomon Jackson – gang vocals (track 11)
- James Killings – guitar (track 12)
- Nathan East – bass (track 13)
- Paulinho da Costa – percussion (track 13)
- Colin Wolfe – bass (track 15)
- Melvin M. Jones – trumpet (track 17)
- Gregory Hudspeth – saxophone (track 17)
- Anthony Roberson – trombone (track 17)

=== Technical ===
- Cyptron – production (tracks 1–3)
- Carlton Lynn – recording (tracks 1–5, 7, 9, 11, 12, 14, 15, 17); recording assistance (tracks 1, 7, 11, 12, 15, 16); mixing (tracks 2, 4, 14)
- Leslie Brathwaite – recording (tracks 1, 3, 9, 11, 15–17); mixing (tracks 5, 11, 17)
- Jeff Griffin – recording assistance (tracks 1, 11, 15)
- Sejoon Kahng – recording assistance (tracks 1, 11, 15)
- Alvin Speights – mixing (tracks 1, 3, 7, 9, 12, 15, 16)
- Vernon J. Mungo – mixing assistance (tracks 1, 3, 5, 7, 9, 11, 12, 15–17); recording assistance (track 13); recording (track 17)
- Ty Hudson – recording assistance (tracks 3, 5, 7, 9, 12, 14, 17); mixing assistance (tracks 14, 17)
- Dallas Austin – production (tracks 4, 7, 9, 11, 12, 14–17); executive production
- Kevin "She'kspere" Briggs – production (track 5); additional vocal production (track 17)
- Jimmy Jam and Terry Lewis – production (track 6)
- Steve Hodge – recording, mixing (track 6)
- Xavier Smith – recording assistance, mixing assistance (track 6)
- Dave Rideau – vocal recording (track 6)
- Gordon Fordyce – vocal recording assistance (track 6)
- Dylan Dresdow – vocal recording assistance (track 6)
- Ricciano Lumpkins – production (track 7); recording (tracks 7, 12, 16)
- John Horesco IV – mixing assistance (track 7); digital editing (track 17)
- Babyface – production (tracks 8, 13); executive production
- Daryl Simmons – production (track 8)
- Paul Boutin – recording (tracks 8, 13)
- Thom "TK" Kidd – lead vocals recording (track 8)
- Kevin Lively – lead vocals recording assistance (track 8); mixing assistance (track 10)
- Ralph Cacciurri – lead vocals recording assistance (track 8)
- Jon Gass – mixing (tracks 8, 13)
- Ivy Skoff – production coordination (tracks 8, 13)
- Jermaine Dupri – production, mixing (track 10)
- Carl So-Lowe – co-production (track 10)
- Brian Frye – recording (track 10)
- Phil Tan – mixing (track 10)
- Diane Makowski – production coordination (track 10)
- Debra Killings – production (track 12)
- Aman Junaid – recording (tracks 12, 17)
- E'lyk – mixing assistance (track 13)
- Claudine Pontier – recording assistance (track 15)
- Herb Powers Jr. – mastering
- Antonio M. Reid – executive production
- TLC – executive production

=== Artwork ===
- TLC – creative concept
- D.L. Warfield – art direction, design
- Cherie O'Brien – creative coordination
- Nigel Sawyer – layout assistance
- Seb Janiak – photography

== Charts ==
=== Weekly charts ===
Weekly chart performance for FanMail
Chart (1999)	Peak position
Australian Albums (ARIA)	15
Austrian Albums (Ö3 Austria)	17
Belgian Albums (Ultratop Flanders)	7
Belgian Albums (Ultratop Wallonia)	11
Canada Top Albums/CDs (RPM)	3
Canadian Albums (Billboard)	3
Canadian R&B Albums (Nielsen SoundScan)	2
Dutch Albums (Album Top 100)	9
European Albums (Music & Media)	9
Finnish Albums (Suomen virallinen lista)	26
French Albums (SNEP)	24
German Albums (Offizielle Top 100)	7
Irish Albums (IRMA)	8
Japanese Albums (Oricon)	10
New Zealand Albums (RMNZ)	6
Norwegian Albums (VG-lista)	22
Scottish Albums (Official Charts)	23
Swedish Albums (Sverigetopplistan)	16
Swiss Albums (Schweizer Hitparade)	11
Taiwanese Albums (IFPI)	4
UK Albums (Official Charts)	7
UK R&B Albums (Official Charts)	1
US Billboard 200	1
US Top R&B/Hip-Hop Albums (Billboard)	1

=== Year-end charts ===
1999 year-end chart performance for FanMail
Chart (1999)	Position
Australian Albums (ARIA)	47
Belgian Albums (Ultratop Flanders)	30
Belgian Albums (Ultratop Wallonia)	53
Canadian Top Albums/CDs (RPM)	9
Danish Albums (Hitlisten)	100
Dutch Albums (Album Top 100)	31
European Albums (Music & Media)	24
French Albums (SNEP)	65
German Albums (Offizielle Top 100)	19
Japanese Albums (Oricon)	58
New Zealand Albums (RMNZ)	21
Swedish Albums & Compilations (Sverigetopplistan)	65
Swiss Albums (Schweizer Hitparade)	48
UK Albums (OCC)	28
US Billboard 200	10
US Top R&B/Hip-Hop Albums (Billboard)	7

2000 year-end chart performance for FanMail
Chart (2000)	Position
US Billboard 200	147

=== Decade-end charts ===
1990–1999 decade-end chart performance for FanMail
Chart (1990–1999)	Position
US Billboard 200	84

== Certifications and sales ==
Certifications and sales for FanMail
Region	Certification	Certified units/sales
Australia (ARIA)	Platinum	70,000^{^}
Belgium (BRMA)	Gold	25,000^{*}
Canada (Music Canada)	4× Platinum	400,000^{^}
France (SNEP)	Gold	100,000^{*}
Germany	—	250,000
Japan (RIAJ)	Million	1,000,000^{^}
Netherlands (NVPI)	Platinum	100,000^{^}
New Zealand (RMNZ)	Platinum	15,000^{^}
Switzerland (IFPI Switzerland)	Platinum	50,000^{^}
United Kingdom (BPI)	Platinum	395,877
United States (RIAA)	6× Platinum	5,677,000 (Note: As of June 2017, FanMail had sold 4.8 million copies in the United States according to Nielsen SoundScan, which does not count albums sold through clubs like the BMG Music Club, where it had sold 877,000 copies as of February 2003. Combined, it has sold over 5,677,000 copies in the US.)
Summaries
Europe (IFPI)	Platinum	1,000,000^{*}
Worldwide	—	10,000,000
^{*} Sales figures based on certification alone.^{^} Shipments figures based on certification alone.

== See also ==
- List of Billboard 200 number-one albums of 1999
- List of Billboard number-one R&B albums of 1999
