= Avi Wisnia =

American singer-songwriter

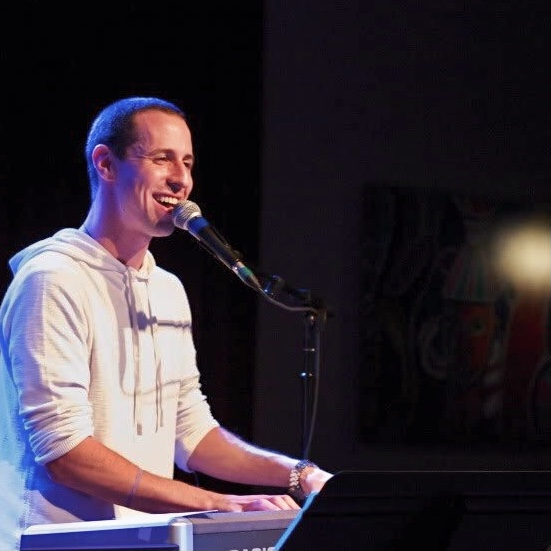

Background information
- Born: 14 November 1982 (age 43)
- Genres: contemporary pop; jazz; acoustic folk; blues; bossa nova
- Occupations: Singer, songwriter
- Instruments: Vocals, Piano, Guitar, Melodica
- Years active: 2005–present
- Label: Independent
- Website: aviwisnia.com

Avi Wisnia (born 14 November 1982) is an American singer, pianist and songwriter based in Philadelphia. He began performing in New York City in 2005 and released his debut EP, Avi Wisnia Presents, in 2007. His two subsequent full-length albums, Something New (2010) and Catching Leaves (2021), received praise from New York, Philadelphia and national press. He has received numerous awards and nominations for his work including the 2009 OutMusic Award for outstanding jazz song of the year for his rendition of TLC's "No Scrubs."

Wisnia has performed in venues around the world. In 2015 he accompanied his grandfather, a singer and Holocaust survivor, for a series of performances in Poland marking 70 years since the liberation of the Auschwitz concentration camp. He has also been active with a number of educational and charitable organizations, including the National Brain Tumor Society, Habitat for Humanity and the LGBT Academy of Recording Artists.

== Style ==
Wisnia's music blends contemporary piano-pop with 1950s West Coast Jazz, blues, acoustic folk and bossa nova. He is a multi-instrumentalist who works primarily in piano and voice, but also plays guitar, melodica, saxophone, clarinet, accordion, and bassoon. His recordings often feature non-musical or toy instruments including typewriter, kazoo, and Fisher Price-brand xylophone.

Wisnia sings in both English and Portuguese. His music has drawn a wide range of comparisons to artists including Rufus Wainwright, Teddy Thompson, Ron Sexsmith, Gabriel Kahane, Ben Folds, and Norah Jones. Critics have praised both his musical and lyrical style.

== Early life and education ==
Wisnia was born in Princeton, New Jersey and raised in Yardley, Pennsylvania, a suburb of Philadelphia. His father was a rabbi. His grandfather, a Holocaust survivor, was cantor at Temple Shalom in Levittown, Pennsylvania and Har Sinai Hebrew Congregation of Trenton, New Jersey.

Wisnia was inspired by his older brother Dov to begin playing piano, and started composing from a young age.

Wisnia moved to New York City in 2001 to study music theory and composition at NYU. During this period he cultivated an interest in Brazilian music and assembled an international group of musicians with a common interest in bossa nova and improvisation.

== Career ==
=== Early New York performances and Avi Wisnia Presents E.P. ===
Wisnia made his performance debut in 2005 at Caffe Vivaldi in New York City.

In 2007 he recorded and released his debut EP titled Avi Wisnia Presents. The EP was recorded in two days in the sanctuary of the New Jersey synagogue where Wisnia's father served as Rabbi and was released later that year.

=== Something New ===
Wisnia released his first full-length album, Something New, in 2010. The album received praise from New York and Philadelphia press. Something New included his cover of TLC's "No Scrubs," which had been released in advance of the album, and won the 2009 OutMusic Award for outstanding jazz song of the year.

=== "Sky Blue Sky" ===
In September 2015, Wisnia released the digital single "Sky Blue Sky" which was recorded with Rio de Janeiro-based producer Bruno Migliari. For the recording, Wisnia and Migliari assembled a band of renown Brazilian musicians, including Marco Lobo on drums and Bernardo Bosisio on guitar. The track was recorded via satellite, with Wisnia recording his parts in Philadelphia, and Migliari recording the rest of the band in Rio.

"Sky Blue Sky" received recognition from the Philadelphia Songwriters Project and Mid-Atlantic Song Contest.

=== Philadelphia and Catching Leaves ===
In 2012, Wisnia settled back in Philadelphia. The next year, he started the Philly Songwriters Circle, a local collective for songwriters to workshop their songs, hosted in his living room. In 2018, he and fellow singer-songwriter Aaron Nathans co-founded Philadelphia Songwriters in the Round, a concert series hosted monthly at the Philadelphia Folksong Society.

Wisnia released his second full-length album, Catching Leaves, in November 2021. It was produced by bassist and conductor Ken Pendergast and recorded at Morning Star Studios in Philadelphia. The ensemble that played on the record also included guitarist Erik Sayles, drummer Chuck Staab, and singers Samantha Rise, Jeremy Grenhart, Alexandra Day.

The songs on Catching Leaves were written following the passing of Wisnia's brother and grandfather, who each had a strong impact on his relationship with music. The album received critical praise for its eclectic and inventive arrangements as well as its lyrical themes of love, loss, grief, and acceptance.

== Holocaust legacy ==
In 2015, Avi Wisnia accompanied his grandfather David Wisnia, a holocaust survivor, for a series of performances in Poland marking the 70th anniversary of the liberation of Auschwitz. David Wisnia was a young singing star in Warsaw before being imprisoned at Auschwitz during the Nazi occupation of Poland, where he sang to entertain the Nazi guards, ensuring his life was spared. After escaping, he was picked up by the 101st Airborne Division of the United States Armed Forces, where he served as an interpreter through the end of the war with Germany.

Avi Wisnia performed with his grandfather at the Fabryka Trzciny concert hall in Warsaw and at a remembrance event held at the Death Gate of the former Birkenau camp at Auschwitz, where David Wisnia was once imprisoned.

=== My Polish Wisnia ===
In anticipation of the performances, Avi Wisnia launched the "My Polish Wisnia" project where he chronicled their journey to Poland and assembled a collection of stories, songs, news clippings, and excerpts from his grandfather's own memoir, "One Voice, Two Lives." Avi Wisnia has described the project's goal as both a personal family chronicle and Holocaust remembrance.

=== How Saba Kept Singing ===
Avi and David Wisnia both appeared in the documentary film "How Saba Kept Singing." It follows the family as they return to Poland to perform in 2020 and recalls the story of David Wisnia using his musical talents to survive the Holocaust and ultimately escape Auschwitz. The film was executive produced by Hillary Rodham Clinton and Chelsea Clinton, written, directed and produced by Sara Taksler, and premiered on PBS.

== Awards and nominations ==
Wisnia has received numerous awards and nominations for his work. In 2009 he won the OutMusic Award for outstanding jazz song of the year for his rendition of TLC's "No Scrubs." The following year the video for his song "Rabbit Hole," produced by Seth Kroll, was an official selection at the Philadelphia music and Film Festival as well as the Florida Music Festival Indie Film Jam. "Rabbit Hole" was recognized again in 2011 at the Glovebox Short Film and Animation Festival, where it was awarded runner-up in the music video category. He was an OutMusic Awards winner again when his song "Maoz Tsur (Rock of Ages)" won for best jazz/cabaret song. In 2017 he was awarded Musician of the Year by Bucks Happening magazine. Delaware Valley Public Media awarded him Keyboard Player of the Year in 2022.

== Performances and tours ==
Wisnia has performed around the world. He has played a number of prestigious U.S. venues including Lincoln Center and Joe's Pub in New York City, the Philadelphia museum of art and World Cafe Live in Philadelphia and the Kennedy Center and Smithsonian Museum of Art in Washington, D.C. In 2022 he performed in the 60th Annual Philadelphia Folk Festival, the longest running American folk festival in the country.

In 2011 he partnered with Rio de Janeiro-based singer-songwriter-guitarist Denise Reis for a series of six performances in Brazil. In 2015 he accompanied his grandfather Cantor David Wisnia for a series of performances in Poland marking the 70th anniversary of the liberation of Auschwitz. In 2018 he played a string of shows in Japan with guitarist Toru Takiguchi's ToruJazz Trio.

== Personal life ==
Wisnia is Jewish-American and the grandson of Holocaust survivor Cantor David Wisnia.

He founded the No Brainer concert series in 2007 following his older brother Dov Wisnia's brain cancer diagnosis. The concert series is connected to the Race For Hope Philadelphia, which raises funds and awareness for the National Brain Tumor Society. Dov Wisnia died in October 2012.

Wisnia is an openly gay artist and has been involved in with the LGBT Academy of Recording Artists' efforts to highlight the work of LGBTQ songwriters and performers in the music industry. He has also organized showcases for LGBTQ musicians in Austin, Texas.

In 2013 he was invited to give a TED talk as part of the TEDxCapeMay program. His talk was titled the "Nature and Nurture of Bossa Nova". He has also performed with the Moth Storytellers.

== Discography ==
All songs are written by Avi Wisnia, except where noted

=== Albums ===
Title	Details	Tracklist	Writers
Avi Wisnia Presents:	Released: November 2, 2007; Label: Avi Wisnia	7 tracks: 1. Something New; 2. I Wish That I Could Stop Writing Songs About You; 3. Sunday Afternoon; 4. Rabbit Hole; 5. The Back Of Your Hand; 6. Goodnight; 7. Moving	
Something New	Released: June 21, 2010; Label: Avi Wisnia, Mo Show Publishing (ASCAP), except Track 5 released by Universal Music Publishing MGB Limited (ASCAP) and Track 12 released by Air Control Music Inc/EMI April Music Inc/Kandacy Music/Tiny Tam Music/Tony Mercedes Music/W B Music Corp (ASCAP)	12 tracks: 1. New Year; 2. More Than Me; 3. I Wish That I Could Stop Writing Songs About You; 4. Sink; 5. Love Song (cover); 6. Rabbit Hole; 7. The Back of Your Hand; 8. Prelude (instrumental); 9. Something New; 10. Não É Coisa; 11. It's only Me; 12. No Scrubs (cover)	Writers: 5. Love Song - Robert James Smith, Simon Jonathon Gallup, Boris Peter Bransby Williams, Pearl Thompson, Roger O'Donnell, Laurence Andrew Tolhurst; 12.No Scrubs - Kevin Briggs, Kandi Burruss, Tameka Cottle and Lisa "Left Eye" Lopes; {{{2}}}
Catching Leaves	Released: November 5, 2021; Label: Avi Wisnia, Mo Show Publishing (ASCAP), except Track 1 and Track 2 released by Avi Wisnia, Seth Kroll; Track 4 released by Silver Fiddle Music; Track 8 released by BMG Bumblebee/Warner-Tamerlane; Track 12 'Dindi' released by Corvovado Music Corporation/Ipanema Music	14 tracks: 1. Catching Leaves; 2. Heat Lightning; 3. Come Home To; 4. Harvest Moon (cover); 5. You're Wrong; 6. Somebody Else's Fault; 7. Make Me Cry; 8. How To Fight Loneliness (cover); 9. It's Gonna Rain Today; 10. Simple Words; 11. Just Another Daydream; 12. Dindi (cover); 13. Goodnight; 14. Sky Blue Sky [Bonus Track]	Writers: 1. Catching Leaves - Avi Wisnia, Seth Kroll; 2. Heat Lightning - Avi Wisnia, Seth Kroll; 4. Harvest Moon - Neil Young; 8. How To Fight Loneliness - Jeff Tweedy(Wilco), Jay Bennett; 12. Dindi - Antonio Carlos Jobim, Aloysio De Olivera, Ray Gilbert; {{{2}}}

=== Singles ===
Title	Details	Recording information
Maoz Tsur (Rock of Ages)	Released: November 23, 2011; Label: Avi Wisnia Mo Show Publishing	Recording information: Recorded and Mixed by Roger Greenawalt at Shabby Road Studios, Brooklyn; Mastered by Brad Cohn
Sky Blue Sky	Released: September 1, 2015; Label: Avi Wisnia	Recording information: Track credits: 1. Composition: Avi Wisnia; 2. Arrangement: Avi Wisnia and Bruno Migliari; 3. Produced by: Bruno Migliari (Rio de Janeiro, Brazil), Avi Wisnia and Daniel Harris Levine (Philadelphia, US); Recording Engineers: 1. Bruno Migliari: Rhythm Section (Percussion, Bass, Guitar, Cavaquinho, Electric Piano and Effects); recording sessions held at 8VB Studio, Rio de Janeiro, Brazil.; 2. Daniel Harris Levine: Vocals, Melodica and Electric Piano; recording sessions held in Philadelphia, US); Mixing and Mastering Engineers: 1. Bruno Migliari: mixing at 8VB Studio, Rio de Janeiro, Brazil; 2. Mark Dann: mastering at Mark Dann Recording, New York, US
Passover	Released: June 20, 2016; Label: Avi Wisnia	Recording Information: Recorded by Shawn Fogel of Golden Bloom

== See also ==
- Sara Bareilles
- Melody Gardot
- Jamie Cullum
- Carole King
- Singer-songwriter
- Philadelphia music
- LGBT culture in Philadelphia
- Yom HaShoah
- Holocaust Remembrance Day
- International Holocaust Remembrance Day
