= Silly Ho =

Promotional single by TLC

from the album FanMail
- A-side: "No Scrubs"
- Released: December 29, 1998
- Recorded: 1998
- Genre: Electro; hip hop; R&B-techno
- Length: 4:15
- Label: LaFace
- Songwriter: Dallas Austin
- Producer: Cyptron

"Silly Ho" is a song recorded by American girl group TLC for their third studio album FanMail (1999). The song was written and produced by TLC's long-time collaborator Dallas Austin under his artificial intelligence alter ego pseudonym named Cyptron. Instead of Lisa "Left Eye" Lopes's vocals being on the song due to a busy schedule, Vic-E, the then temporary voice-based fourth member for the group's FanMail era, makes an appearance on the rap verse and provides ad-libs.

The song was sent to radio stations as a promotional single prior to the release of FanMail and reached number 21 on the Billboard Hot R&B/Hip-Hop Songs chart. The song also peaked at number 59 on the Hot 100. "Silly Ho" received mixed reviews from music critics, who complimented the track itself while criticizing its misleading feminist lyrics. It also featured on several compilation albums.

== Composition ==
"Silly Ho" is a R&B-techno song that built on a foundation of "annoying sonic" burrs and "cutesy chop-suey" synths. The song along with "I'm Good At Being Bad" were said to crank up the "raunch level" for the girls. Two authors Kerry Mallan and Sharyn Pearce analyzed its content in their book Youth Cultures: Texts, Images, and Identities:

"[The song] describes the narrator as a woman who has never relied on her partner to buy her what she wants. Indeed the narrator describes how she bought her own rings, so overturning the conventional associations of rings with romance. Such a position of autonomy is compared with the sexual obligation incurred by the "silly ho" who will do whatever is required by her man."

With the lyrics: ”I ain’t never been no silly bitch/Waiting to get rich/From a nigga bank account,” which David Browne from Entertainment Weekly points out they were talking about taking control of their own finances. However, Complex's Julianne Escobedo Shepherd said the track's message was one of total independence, "and not playing one's self out to sit at the feet of a dude." Jet agreed, the publication noticed the song's similar message to "No Scrubs", but more about "a kind of female who can't get her life together." Vic-E then raps "You know you can't get with this.../ Stuck on silly shit/ Boy you know you need to quit" before declaring "[she's] out" on the bridge of the song.

== Critical reception ==
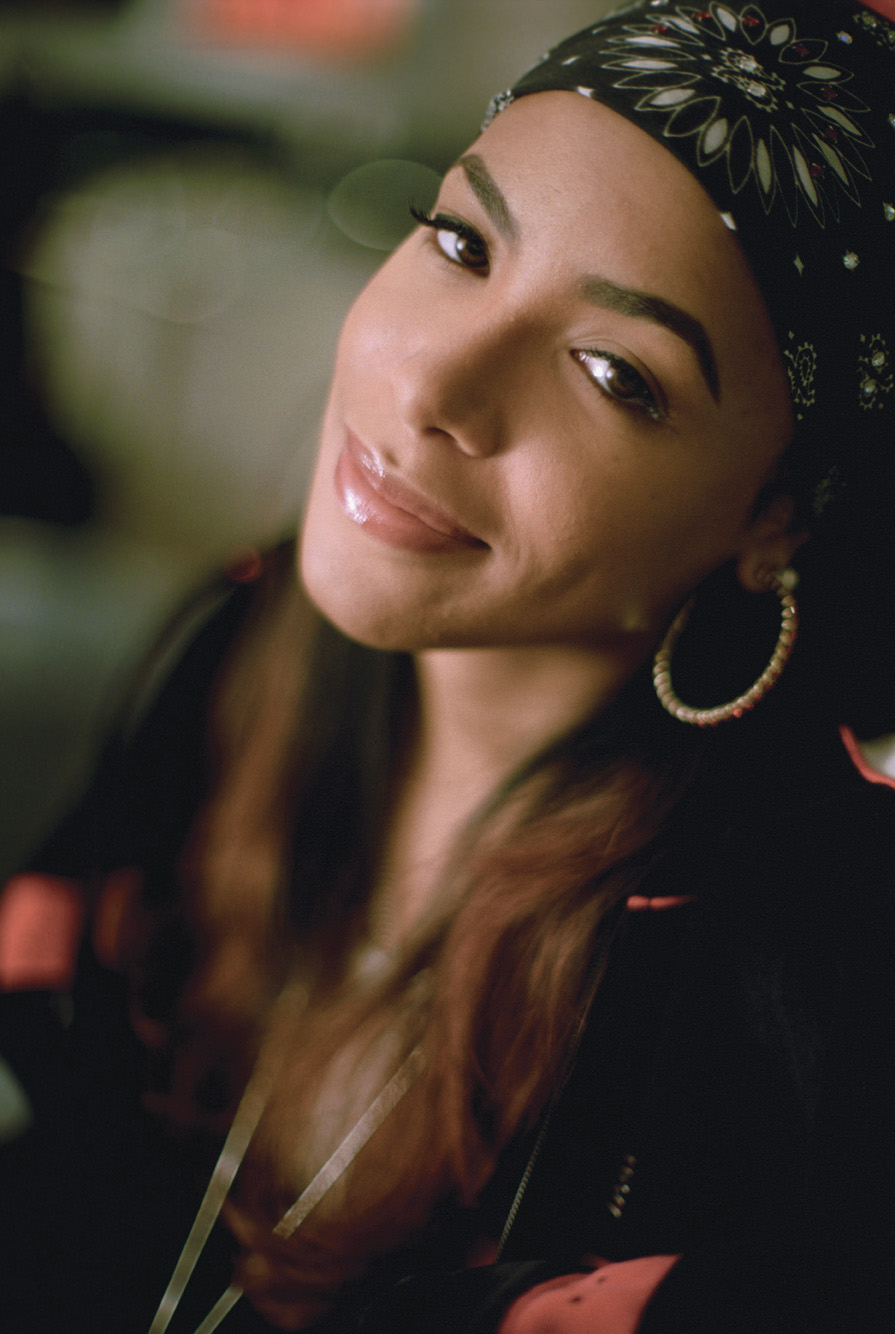
The song was mostly compared to Aaliyah's track "Are You That Somebody?".

David Browne from Entertainment Weekly said the song could be a jingle for "a hip-hop investment firm." Kelefa Sanneh described it as, "a startling single, which I loved: a violent buzzing sound interrupted every few lines, as if the producer, Dallas Austin, were playing a prank".

In a retrospective review by Complex's Julianne Escobedo Shepherd, she said Austin was doing his best Timbaland imitation of Aaliyah's "Are You That Somebody?" on the track. Billboard's Chuck Taylor also compared the two songs, questioning whether the song is a throwaway track to stir interest before knowing if they have made any true progress. Ann Powers from Rolling Stone, however, criticized Austin's attempt at girl power on the song as "misguided."

Positively, Robert Christgau and The A.V. Club's Nathan Rabin both chose the song as one of Fanmail's best tracks. Similarly, Jonathan Bernstein from Spin predicted the track to be a "future hit".

== Release and commercial performance ==
The song was the first song and promotional single released off their album as a teaser for FanMail. Both the song and "No Scrubs" have gotten "tremendous" airplay.

American musician Girl Talk took samples of the song for his mash-up track "All Eyes on Me" on the album Unstoppable (2004). In 2016, Canadian producer Jåmvvis covers the song with a new jazz-influenced, sax-heavy, bass driven redition.

== Live performances ==
On June 22, 2013, TLC includes the track on their hits medley while performing at the 2013 MTV Video Music Awards Japan, receiving the Legend Award.

"Silly Ho" / "Kick Your Game" / "Hat 2 da Back" (Super Bowl Blitz 2014)

== Formats and track listings ==
- Promotional US CD
1. "Silly Ho" (Clean Version) – 4:15
2. "Silly Ho" (Instrumental) – 4:15
3. "Silly Ho" (Callout Research Hook) – 0:10

- Promotional US 12" vinyl
1. "Silly Ho" (Clean Version) – 4:16
2. "Silly Ho" (Album Version) – 4:16
3. "Silly Ho" (Instrumental) – 4:16
4. "Silly Ho" (A cappella) – 4:16

== Charts ==
Chart (1999)	Peak position
Canada Top Singles (RPM)	32
US Billboard Hot 100	59
US Hot R&B/Hip-Hop Songs (Billboard)	21
US Rhythmic Airplay (Billboard)	5

=== Year-end charts ===
Chart (1999)	Position
US Rhythmic (Billboard)	31
