= Ricky J =

Canadian DJ

Ricky J is a DJ and rapper from Montreal, Quebec, Canada, who is known for the single "No Means No", which was very popular in Canada, peaking at #2 on the Billboard Canada single sales chart. Ricky J had been active since the late 1990s and opened for TLC on their FanMail Tour in 1999. His debut album, Lose Control, was released in 2001 on Warner Bros. Records. He later left Warner Bros. to sign with an independent label, Evolution Records, in 2002. Through Evolution, he released his second album, "WHITEBOYS". In 2010, he released the single "Whatta Night", and was featured on the 2011 album 4Play in the track "Good Life".
