= Dear Lie =

1999 single by TLC

Single by TLC

from the album FanMail
- B-side: "Sleigh Ride"
- Released: December 6, 1999
- Length: 5:12 (album version); 4:38 (radio edit)
- Label: LaFace; Arista
- Songwriters: Kenneth Edmonds; Tionne Watkins
- Producer: Babyface

TLC singles chronology
"Unpretty" (1999)	"Dear Lie" (1999)	"What It Ain't (Ghetto Enuff)" (2000)

"Dear Lie" is a song by American group TLC. It was written by Kenneth "Babyface" Edmonds and band member Tionne "T-Boz" Watkins for the trio's third studio album FanMail (1999), featuring production by Edmonds. The song was released as the album's third and final single on December 6, 1999, peaking at number 51 on the US Billboard Hot 100 and reaching the top 40 in several other countries. "Dear Lie" is included on the group's 2009 compilation album, We Love TLC.

== Background and composition ==
The idea for the song initially came from a poem written by Tionne "T-Boz" Watkins titled "What's My Name", which was published in her book of semi-autobiographical poetry called Thoughts. The poem was later turned into a song with the help of Babyface. Watkins discussed that her father constantly lied, which put a strain on their relationship. Watkins stated that the song began with the group's vulnerability and transformed into "a place of strength". Rozonda "Chilli" Thomas enjoyed that the song played out as a metaphor for power, stating that

You can hear a lie that somebody says about you and it's not true. But it can really have so much power over you and that is why it sucks. But you've got to take that power back. We get so caught up sometimes in being upset about things and the person that we're allowing to have that type of power over us are doing just fine and as they say these days, living their best life.

== Commercial performance ==
The song reached the top 40 in several countries, including Australia, Canada, Ireland, New Zealand, and the United Kingdom. It also reached number 51 on the US Billboard Hot 100. Despite its peak in the United Kingdom, it is their sixth best-selling single there.

== Music video ==
A music video for "Dear Lie", directed by Bille Woodruff, was shot on September 26, 1999. This video features solo parts of both Thomas and Watkins in an apartment, confronted by hyperactive and overconfident alter-egos and trying to tune them out, and performance shots of Watkins, Lisa "Left Eye" Lopes, and Thomas in a hallway. At the end shot, Lopes is shown running down the hall, knocking at the doors before running out of the frame. Reportedly, none of the performers were on speaking terms with each other during the video shoot due to Lopes' frustrations with the FanMail album. Lopes stated in an online interview in 2001 that none of the members of TLC liked the video. The video was only released in foreign countries, and aired exclusively on MTV UK on December 9, 1999.

== Track listings ==
Australian and European maxi-CD single

1. "Dear Lie" (radio edit) – 3:55
2. "Dear Lie" (album version) – 5:10
3. "Unpretty" (MJ Cole mix vox up) – 4:46
4. "Sleigh Ride" (album version) – 3:43

European CD single

1. "Dear Lie" (radio edit) – 3:55
2. "Sleigh Ride" (album version) – 3:43

UK CD single

1. "Dear Lie" (radio edit) – 3:55
2. "Dear Lie" (album version) – 5:10
3. "Sleigh Ride" (album version) – 3:43

UK cassette single

1. "Dear Lie" (album version) – 5:10
2. "Sleigh Ride" (album version) – 3:43

== Personnel ==
Personnel are adapted from the album's liner notes.

- TLC: vocals
- Tionne "T-Boz" Watkins: writing, background vocals
- Debra Killings: background vocals
- Babyface: writing, production, keyboards, drum programming, electric and acoustic guitars
- Greg Phillinganes: Wurlitzer
- Nathan East: bass
- Michael Thompson: electric guitar
- Paulinho Da Costa: percussion
- Paul Boutin: recording
- Vernon J. Mungo: assistant engineering
- Jon Gass: mixing
- Ely’k: assistant mix engineering
- John Hanes: Pro Tools engineering
- Ivy Skoff: production coordinator

== Charts ==
=== Weekly charts ===
Chart (1999–2000)	Peak position
Australia (ARIA)	35
Belgium (Ultratop 50 Flanders)	36
Belgium (Ultratip Bubbling Under Wallonia)	20
Canada Top Singles (RPM)	19
Canada Adult Contemporary (RPM)	49
Europe (European Hot 100 Singles)	54
France (SNEP)	40
Germany (GfK)	37
Ireland (IRMA)	12
Netherlands (Dutch Top 40)	17
Netherlands (Single Top 100)	26
New Zealand (Recorded Music NZ)	10
Romania (Romanian Top 100)	2
Scottish Singles Sales (Official Charts)	40
Sweden (Sverigetopplistan)	24
Switzerland (Schweizer Hitparade)	29
UK Singles (Official Charts)	31
UK Hip Hop/R&B (Official Charts)	6
US Billboard Hot 100	51
US Hot R&B/Hip-Hop Songs (Billboard)	70
US Pop Airplay (Billboard)	22
US Rhythmic Airplay (Billboard)	21

=== Year-end charts ===
Chart (2000)	Position
Romania (Romanian Top 100)	32
US Mainstream Top 40 (Billboard)	98

== Release history ==
Region	Date	Format(s)	Label(s)	Ref(s).
Sweden	December 6, 1999	CD	LaFace; Arista; BMG	
United Kingdom	December 6, 1999	CD; cassette	LaFace; Arista; BMG	
United States	January 4, 2000	Rhythmic contemporary; contemporary hit radio	LaFace; Arista	
United States	January 25, 2000	Urban radio	LaFace; Arista	
