= Seb Janiak =

French photographer and film director

Seb Janiak is a French photographer and video director of Polish origin. In 2009, after an international career making music clips and working as a fashion photographer, he turned to artistic and scientific research in the field of art photography.

In 2007 and 2008, he worked with the gallery Art Photo Expo, which presented his photographs, in particular at the contemporary art fair Art Basel Miami Beach (at the 2007 and 2008 events).

His first book of art photographs was published at the end of 2011 by the Swiss-based Zauberkind Edition, with a preface written by Philippe Starck.

== Biography ==
In 25 years of taking photos, Seb Janiak has explored regions of striking diversity. To draw up an inventory of them would be something like establishing a map of all the possibilities afforded by the photographic medium, so vast is their scope. Thanks to the accelerating progress made throughout the history of photography, the new technical possibilities threw the field open to images of a new kind. But only a handful of individuals managed to develop an artistic language and to trace a path in the terra incognita being opened up by the new tools they now had at their disposal. It's a fair bet that even fewer of them provide innovative answers to the problems posed by the previous generations. Seb Janiak is one of these. From his matte paintings which, in the mid-1980s, were revolutionary by the digital techniques they used and the unprecedented visions they offered, to his latest laser-beam photographs taken through a prism, which seek to capture light in its original purity without any use of artifice (just like the founding fathers of photography did in the first half of the nineteenth century), Janiak has managed to maintain a form of overall coherence while covering all the possibilities available in the field of photography. This coherence is all the more remarkable given the major revolution that photography has gone through over the past thirty years with the advent of digital technologies. Seb Janiak is the prisoner of no school and of no period, but draws his inspiration from the complexity of the world around him, to use - and reveal through his photographs - the dynamic tension between opposites.

The intensity of his creative energy is also that of his existence, as measured between success and retreat, surface and depth, or attachment and transcendence.

First of all, for a young freelance graphic designer who did not necessarily see himself as an artist but who wanted above all to give free rein to his curiosity, it was a matter of experimenting with an instrument he discovered by chance, which opened up a way to devising stunning-looking images.

In 1987, the Quantel Paintbox made it possible to digitally compose and touch up pictures. Seb Janiak was one of the first to use it for purposes other than those of its initial fields of application (television and cinema) to create photographic images for exhibition. In these photographs, scenes of frenzied fantasty were rendered with a hitherto unequalled degree of realism. A new aesthetic of the photographic image could be seen emerging. Thanks to the digital assembly of different shots taken all over the world, large-scale images showing a world of science-fiction assumed the staggering transparency of photography.

These images of a new kind were to become a model for the two decades that followed. But Janiak still had to accomplish this before anyone else did.

In fact, Seb Janiak is a precursor, driven by an incessant desire to question the world through his observation of it, and use the means available to the artist to re-configure it.

His interest is inexhaustible in anything that enriches the understanding of reality, opens up new perspectives and creates meaning. Whether the phenomena concerned are institutionalized (religions, sciences, especially astrophysics) or marginal (esotericism, sensitive crystallization), Janiak's imagination draws from the sources of humanity in its infinite diversity, beyond places and times.

An overview of his work is enlightening in this respect, The success of his first digital photographs was followed by a meteoric rise in the field of international fashion. Being henceforth in a position to call upon substantial resources, Seb Janiak achieved notoriety and produced images that both spoke of their time and shaped it. From the still image, he naturally went on to video and very quickly some of the most influential musicians called on him to make their clips (Daft Punk, Janet Jackson, NTM, Robbie Williams, etc.).

In 2001, after ten years of bustling activity, serious health problems forced him to change his life dramatically. Then in full control of his artistic craft, he resumed the course of his photographic experiments, free from the constraints of having to work to order. Enriching his work via many different sorts of influences, such as classical oriental texts (the Bardo Thodol, books on Chinese medicine, etc.) or the history of Western painting, Janiak over the years composed several series of works of striking force, in which the human presence gives way to nature and ideas.

The kingdom, started in 2008, is an essential stage in this lengthy process. These large-scale photographs of tormented skies, custodians of the fundamental energy revealed by the transformations of the clouds, are once more based on the techniques of digital editing which had begun with the matte paintings. Breath-taking in quality, they are followed by other equally striking series, in which Janiak portrays seemingly invisible forces that structure and modulate reality. It is as much a personal quest as a game for an artist who is driven by the urge not to simply stick to appearances. Janiak is kept constantly alert by his incessant questioning of the world, in response to which he shapes answers and proposals. In images.

Since 2011, he has set himself fresh constraints in his research, since he now limits himself to using only the means available to traditional analogue photography, namely double exposure, overprinting and editing.

This virtuoso of digital photography has given up what we might too quickly consider to be his key strength. This new economy of means is fertile, since it leads him to develop increasingly complex systems in the studio to be able to photograph magnetic fields using ferrofluids, laser or solar rays (Visible light), or air bubbles (Vacuity) for his project "Manifestations of the Unseen". In this respect, he is going back to the earliest photographic tradition, in which what is most important is the artist's hand, and the essential challenge is to capture light durably.

In what may be considered as an impulse towards the essence, one might even say towards a form of asceticism, Seb Janiak continues to express in images his reflections on human destiny, the world and its mysterious mechanisms, time and light. All of these phenomena in the making are constantly present in his work, and he investigates them all with the same detailed attention, in his quest to represent their perpetual renewal.

By Paul Frèches, Cultural Attaché at the Consulate General of France in Shanghai.

== List of works ==
Year	Title	Musician	Type of work
1997	Burnin	Daft Punk	Music video
1997	Together Again	Janet Jackson	Music video
1998	Judgement Day	Method Man	Music video
1999	FanMail	TLC	Photography
2002	3D	TLC	Photography
2005	Discopolis	Kris Menace & Lifelike	Music video

=== Video clips ===
- Nina Hagen « in my world » 1992
- Suprême NTM « soul soul » 1992
- Suprême NTM « j’appuie sur la gachette » 1993
- Jean-Louis Aubert – « temps à nouveau », « moment »,
- Suprême NTM, « tout n’est pas si facile », « qu’est-ce qu’on attend pour foutre le feu », « la fièvre »
- Sinclair « votre image », « tranquille », « sur le vif », « l’épreuve du temps »,
- MC Solaar « Obsolète »
- Robyn Loau « siva pacifica »
- IAM « petit frère »
- Layo and Bushwacka! « love story »
- Method Man « judgment day »
- Janet Jackson « together again »
- Daft Punk « Burnin' »
- Vanity 9
  - Alan Braxe & Fred Falke « Palladium »
  - Thomas Bangalter « club soda »
  - Le Knight Club « gator », « hystéria »
  - Howie B « touch »
  - Jess et Crabbe « F9 riot squad », « council »
  - Dj Mehdi « Ulysse »
- Lifelike & Kris Menace « discopolis »
- Robbie Williams « rude box »
- Midfield General « disco sirens »
- Alan Braxe ft Killa Kell « nightwatcher »

=== Short films ===
Suprême NTM « Long form » « Qu’est-ce qu’on attend pour foutre le feu » 1994 The Orion Conspiracy – 2009

"The Orion Conspiracy" (la Conspiration d'Orion). Documentaire-fiction. Durée : 20 minutes.

Sitges International Fantastic film festival 2009, sélection officielle court métrage.

=== Photography ===
- Série "Uchrony", 1987-1996
- Série "Dark side of the Moon", 2010
- Série "The Kingdom", 2009-2015
- Série "Mimesis", 2012-2014

Projet "Manifestations de l'Invisible (Manifestations of the Unseen), 2011-2016

- Série "Photon", 2012-2015
- Série "Magnetic Radiation", 2011-2012
- Série "Gravity" ("Liquid" et "Bulles d'air"), 2012-2015
- Série "Resonance" ("Water drop")
- Série "Morphogenetic field", 2015-2016

=== Expositions ===
- 1987 : « Freeze Frame », première exposition de photo numérique International Network Vidéo et collaboration avec le designer Philippe Starck, Paris.
- 1991
  - « Paris de 2044 à nos jours », exposition des premiers matte-painting (première mondiale). Ancien Musée des automates, Paris.
  - Sollicitation pour exposer les tirages à Berlin, Munich, Londres, Hong-Kong, Los Angeles.
- 2001 : « Archeology of Elegance », Munich, Allemagne (Exposition itinérante : Tokyo, Japon / Metropolitan Museum Photography / Londres, Grande-Bretagne / Los Angeles, États-Unis / Milan, Italie).
- 2002 : « Archeology of Elegance ». Deichtorhallen Museum, Hambourg.
- 2006/07
  - « In Fashion Photo 07 », galerie Art Photo Expo dans le cadre de Art Basel Miami Beach, Miami. Commissaire : Marion de Beaupré.
  - BAC Festival, Festival d’Art Contemporain de la ville de Barcelone, Espagne.
  - NOOVO International Fashion and Photography Festival. Saint-Jacques-de-Compostelle, Espagne.
- 2008
  - Sh Contemporary Shanghai Art Fair ’08. Galerie Paul Frèches, Paris. -FIAC - Show Off, espace Pierre Cardin. Galerie Paul Frèches, Paris. -Photographies contemporaines / Art Valorem, Drouot.
  - « In Fashion Photo 08 » & « Naomi Campbell Retrospective », Art Photo Expo Galerie dans le cadre de Art Basel Miami Beach, Commissaire : Jean Luc Brunel Miami
  - 2009 - Art Photo Expo Gallery, New York.
- 2010 : FIAC off Chic Art Fair. Visionairs Gallery, Paris. -FIAC off Acces & Paradox. Visionairs Gallery, Paris.
- 2011
  - Cutlog Contemporary Art Fair, Bourse du Commerce Paris. 20-23Octobre 2011. -Seb Janiak Art Book – présentation octobre 2011.
  - Fotofever, Espace Pierre Cardin, Paris. 10-13 novembre 2011.
- 2013
  - Berlin, Germany / Preview Berlin Art Fair / September 19–22
- 2014
  - MIA@D Fair Singapour, Visionairs gallery / oct 23-26 « The Kingdom », Fred Torres galerie, NY / nov 14 – mars 11
- 2015
  - Photo Shanghai sept/10-13 2015 Art Central Hong Kong / march 14-16
- 2016
  - Solo-Project Basel Art Fair with Visionairs gallery Asia, June 2016 Kingdom solo show with Visionairs gallery Asia, May 2016 Singapore Contemporary Art Show with Visionairs gallery Asia. January 21–24, 2016
