= Kidnapped by Neptune =

Studio album by Scout Niblett
- Released: May 10, 2005
- Genre: Indie rock, alternative rock
- Length: 54:45
- Label: Too Pure
- Producer: Steve Albini

Scout Niblett chronology
I Am (2003)	Kidnapped by Neptune (2005)	This Fool Can Die Now (2007)

Singles from Kidnapped by Neptune
- 1. "Kidnapped by Neptune"

Kidnapped by Neptune is the third studio album by singer-songwriter Scout Niblett, released on Too Pure records. The album was Niblett's second collaboration with producer Steve Albini.

== Track listing ==
All tracks are written by Scout Niblett

No.	Title	Length
1.	"Hot to Death"	3:58
2.	"Kidnapped by Neptune"	2:46
3.	"Pom-Poms"	3:54
4.	"Lullaby for Scout in 10 Years"	5:03
5.	"Fuck Treasure Island"	2:58
6.	"Relax"	2:30
7.	"Valvoline"	2:41
8.	"Good to Me"	5:33
9.	"Handsome"	2:13
10.	"Safety Pants"	3:12
11.	"Newburyport"	5:55
12.	"This City"	2:15
13.	"Wolfie"	5:17
14.	"Drink to Me"	2:40
15.	"Where Are You?"	3:50
Total length:		54:45

== Personnel ==
- Scout Niblett - vocals, guitar, bass, drums, piano
- Jason Kourkounis - drums, handclapping
- Greg Norman - handclapping
- Jonathan Reig - handclapping
- Chris Saligoe - guitar

Technical personnel

- Steve Albini - engineer
- Paul Schiek - photography (cover art)
