= Sweet Heart Fever =

Studio album by Scout Niblett
- Released: October 9, 2001
- Recorded: April 2001 at Chem19 Studios in Hamilton, Lanarkshire, UK
- Genre: Indie rock, alternative rock, folk rock
- Length: 39:24
- Label: Secretly Canadian

Scout Niblett chronology
Sweet Heart Fever (2001)	I Am (2003)

Singles from Sweet Heart Fever
- 1. "Miss My Lion" Released: September 17, 2001

Sweet Heart Fever is the debut studio album by singer-songwriter Scout Niblett, released in October 2001 on Secretly Canadian records. Although the album received little media attention, Pitchfork gave the album a highly favorable review.

== Track listing ==
All tracks are written by Scout Niblett, unless otherwise noted

No.	Title	Writer(s)	Length
1.	"So Much Love to Do"		3:46
2.	"Miss My Lion"		3:59
3.	"Into"		2:17
4.	"Dance of Sulphur"		2:47
5.	"Wet Road"		3:26
6.	"Lula"	Traditional	0:58
7.	"Advice"		2:14
8.	"Big Bad Man"		1:57
9.	"Check Out the Maker"		3:24
10.	"Ground Breaking Service"		1:39
11.	"Wide Shoulders"		3:22
12.	"The Sun and I"		3:29
13.	"Brighter"		4:45
14.	"Sweet Heart Fever"		1:21
Total length:			39:24

== Personnel ==
- Scout Niblett - vocals, guitar, drums, double bass, percussion
- Kristian Goddard - drums

Technical personnel

- Andy Miller - engineer
