= I Am (Scout Niblett album) =

Studio album by Scout Niblett
- Released: September 2, 2003
- Genre: Indie rock, alternative rock
- Length: 39:43
- Label: Secretly Canadian
- Producer: Steve Albini

Scout Niblett chronology
Sweet Heart Fever (2001)	I Am (2003)	Kidnapped by Neptune (2005)

Singles from I Am
- 1. "Drummer Boy" Released: September 1, 2003; 2. "I'll Be a Prince (Shhh)" Released: December 8, 2003

I Am is the second studio album by English singer-songwriter Scout Niblett, released on Secretly Canadian records. The album was produced by Steve Albini.

== Track listing ==
All tracks are written by Scout Niblett

No.	Title	Length
1.	"Miss in Love With Her Own Fate"	3:09
2.	"No-Ones Wrong (Giricocola)"	4:24
3.	"In Love"	1:47
4.	"Until Death"	5:23
5.	"Fire Flies"	3:33
6.	"I'll Be a Prince (Shhh)"	3:08
7.	"Boy"	1:27
8.	"Texas"	0:38
9.	"Drummer Boy"	4:38
10.	"12 Miles"	4:34
11.	"Your Beat Kicks Back Like Death"	3:00
12.	"It's All For You"	2:07
13.	"I Am"	1:55
Total length:		39:43

== Personnel ==
- Scout Niblett - vocals, guitar, drums, ukulele
- Chris Saligoe - guitar
- Pete Schreiner - drums

Technical personnel

- Steve Albini - engineer
