= Unpretty =

1999 single by TLC

- CD single green cover

Single by TLC

from the album FanMail
- Released: May 17, 1999
- Studio: D.A.R.P., Bosstown (Atlanta, Georgia)
- Genre: Pop rock; alternative rock; R&B
- Length: 4:38 (album version); 4:08 (radio version)
- Label: LaFace; Arista
- Songwriters: Dallas Austin; Tionne Watkins
- Producer: Dallas Austin

TLC singles chronology
"No Scrubs" (1999)	"Unpretty" (1999)	"Dear Lie" (1999)

Music video
- "Unpretty" on YouTube

"Unpretty" is a song by American group TLC, released on May 17, 1999, through LaFace and Arista Records as the second single from the band's third studio album, FanMail. It was written by Tionne "T-Boz" Watkins and producer Dallas Austin. Watkins had written a poem to express her disgust over an episode of Ricki Lake, and Austin helped her adapt it into the song.

"Unpretty" was the album's second song to top the US Billboard Hot 100, which it did for three weeks. The song topped the chart in Iceland and peaked in the top 10 in Australia, Canada, Ireland, the Netherlands, Norway, New Zealand, Sweden, Switzerland, and the United Kingdom. An accompanying music video was directed by Paul Hunter, which depicts the band situated in three separate storylines. The song was nominated for Song of the Year and Best Pop Performance by a Duo or Group with Vocal at the 42nd Annual Grammy Awards.

== Background and composition ==
Watkins was in the hospital when she conceived the idea of "Unpretty" after watching an episode of American talk show Ricki Lake, in which the men on the show called women "fat pigs". She wrote the song out as a poem and gave it to Austin to record in the booth. Austin wanted to incorporate TLC's music into a folk and alternative rock sound. He wrote "Unpretty" as an "acoustic-driven pop song" in order for people to conceive TLC as an established group. Stacy Lambe of VH1 described the song as having an "alternative rock vibe".

== Commercial performance ==
The song peaked at number one on the Billboard Hot 100, spending three weeks atop the chart. It was the second consecutive number-one single from the album, following "No Scrubs". It would also be the group's fourth and final number one on the chart, alongside being their last single to enter the top-ten. Worldwide, the song reached number one in Iceland for a week and peaked within the top 10 in Australia, Canada, Ireland, the Netherlands, Norway, New Zealand, Sweden, Switzerland, and the UK.

It was nominated for Song of the Year and Best Pop Performance by a Duo or Group with Vocal at the 42nd Annual Grammy Awards.

== Music video ==
=== Background ===
Paul Hunter directed the music video for "Unpretty", which was filmed in June 1999 in Valencia, California, and cost over $1.6 million in production. A shortened edit of the video was created, which was released to an all-ages audience (as "Children's Version"), that removes the solo storylines of both Watkins and bandmate Lisa "Left Eye" Lopes, as some of the scenes were deemed as too explicit.

=== Synopsis ===
The video begins with the TLC members entering a meditation hut. As the three women begin to meditate, a probe camera is released to record images of struggles in daily life, which ties together vignettes of several different stories relating to the song's lyrics. Several shots of TLC meditating and in a pink and purple field of flowers are shown intermittently throughout the video.

The main set of vignettes features a young woman, portrayed by band member Chilli, and an overweight teenager (played by actress Tamika Katon-Donegal). Chilli's boyfriend convinces her to get breast implants to augment her modest bust. However, after she sees another patient in the hospital (played by singer Jade Villalon) getting her implants painfully removed, the woman flees the hospital in fear, and is later shown fighting with her boyfriend when she catches him reading magazines of busty women. The other girl is worried about fitting the "ideal" image of the petite supermodel and struggling with bulimia as a result. Near the end of the video, however, she tears down the unrealistic images of models that she has tacked on her wall and changes into a bathing suit.

Another vignette features Watkins as a high school student who is harassed by two boys because she is a girl, only to be saved by her teacher, who sends the boys away and retrieves her stuff for her. The last vignette features Lopes as an inner-city woman who plays her verse from "I'm Good at Being Bad" to her friend in her car. They come across a city gang, who are approached by a rival gang who begin to threaten them. The two gangs start fighting, which becomes so violent that knives and guns are involved and Lopes and her friend duck for cover as her car window is damaged. When the fight subsides, Lopes leaves the car to assist the remaining injured and barely conscious survivors. One of the survivors has been mortally wounded due to being stabbed in the heart, so Lopes applies pressure on his chest to stop the bleeding and prays as they wait for the police to arrive. Lopes also appears in the "Unpretty" performance shots reciting the song lyrics in American Sign Language.

== Track listings ==
- US CD and cassette single (green cover)
1. "Unpretty" (album version) – 4:38
2. "Unpretty" ("Don't Look Any Further" remix) – 4:25
- US 12-inch maxi single (green cover)
1. "Unpretty" (radio version) – 4:01
2. "Unpretty" ("Don't Look Any Further" remix) – 4:26
3. "Unpretty" ("Don't Look Any Further" remix a cappella) – 4:26
4. "Unpretty" (Pumpin' Dolls club mix) – 8:59
5. "Unpretty" ("Don't Look Any Further" remix w/ rap) – 4:26
- European CD single (green cover)
1. "Unpretty" (radio version) – 4:05
2. "Unpretty" (M. J. Cole remix—vox up) – 4:46
- UK CD single 1 (green cover)
1. "Unpretty" (radio version) – 4:08
2. "No Scrubs" (radio version w/ rap) – 4:06
3. "Diggin' on You" (radio version) – 4:13
- UK CD single 2 (blue cover)
1. "Unpretty" (radio version) – 4:08
2. "Unpretty" (M. J. Cole remix—vox up) – 4:48
3. "Unpretty" ("Don't Look Any Further" remix) – 4:25
- European and Australian CD maxi single 1 (green cover)
1. "Unpretty" (radio version) – 4:05
2. "Unpretty" (album version) – 4:38
3. "Unpretty" (M. J. Cole remix—vox up) – 4:46
4. "Unpretty" (M. J. Cole remix—budd dub) – 5:36
5. "Unpretty" (instrumental) – 4:43
- European and Australian maxi single 2 (blue cover)
1. "Unpretty" (radio version) – 4:01
2. "Unpretty" ("Don't Look Any Further" remix w/o rap) – 4:26
3. "Unpretty" ("Don't Look Any Further" remix w/ rap) – 4:26
4. "Unpretty" (Pumpin' Dolls radio mix) – 4:03
5. "Unpretty" ("Don't Look Any Further" remix—Big Boyz dub mix) – 5:00
6. "Unpretty" (Pumpin' Dolls club mix) – 8:59
- German maxi single (blue cover)
1. "Unpretty" (radio version) – 4:01
2. "Unpretty" ("Don't Look Any Further" remix w/o rap) – 4:26
3. "Unpretty" ("Don't Look Any Further" remix w/ rap) – 4:26
4. "Unpretty" (Pumpin' Dolls radio mix) – 4:03
5. "Unpretty" ("Don't Look Any Further" remix—Big Boyz dub mix) – 5:00
6. "Unpretty" (Pumpin' Dolls club mix) – 8:59
7. "Unpretty" (Amber Remix)" – 4:36

== Credits and personnel ==
Credits for "Unpretty" adapted from AllMusic.

- Sharliss Asbury – A&R
- Dallas Austin – arranger, composer, executive producer, producer
- Leslie Brathwaite – engineer
- MJ Cole – producer, remixing
- Regina Davenport – A&R
- Jonathan Donker – engineer, mixing, producer, remixing
- Kenneth Edmonds – executive producer
- Dennis Edwards – composer
- Franne Golde – composer
- Duane Hitchings – composer
- Ty Hudson – assistant
- Debra Killings – bass, vocals (background)
- Tom Knight – drums
- Mike "Mad" Lewin – engineer, mixing, producer, remixing
- Andrew Lyn – remix assistant
- Carlton Lynn – engineer
- Tomi Martin – guitar
- Vernon Mungo – assistant
- Charlie O'Brien – creative coordinator
- Herb Powers – mastering
- Kawan "KP" Prather – A&R
- L.A. Reid – executive producer
- Rick Sheppard – design
- Alvin Speights – mixing
- TLC – creative concept, executive producer, primary artist
- Candy Tookes – A&R
- D.L. Warfield – art direction, design
- Tionne "T-Boz" Watkins – composer

== Charts ==
=== Weekly charts ===
Weekly chart performance for "Unpretty"
Chart (1999)	Peak position
Australia (ARIA)	3
Austria (Ö3 Austria Top 40)	24
Belgium (Ultratop 50 Flanders)	13
Belgium (Ultratop 50 Wallonia)	30
Canada Top Singles (RPM)	3
Canada Adult Contemporary (RPM)	12
Canada Dance/Urban (RPM)	3
Canada CHR (Nielsen BDS)	6
Croatia International (HRT)	6
Europe (Eurochart Hot 100)	9
Finland (Suomen virallinen lista)	12
France (SNEP)	32
Germany (GfK)	16
Hungary (Mahasz)	8
Iceland (Íslenski Listinn Topp 20)	1
Ireland (IRMA)	4
Italy (Musica e dischi)	20
Netherlands (Dutch Top 40)	6
Netherlands (Single Top 100)	8
New Zealand (Recorded Music NZ)	3
Norway (VG-lista)	10
Poland Airplay (Music & Media)	14
Scottish Singles Sales (Official Charts)	11
Spain (Promusicae)	20
Sweden (Sverigetopplistan)	8
Switzerland (Schweizer Hitparade)	9
UK Singles (Official Charts)	6
UK Airplay (Music Week)	1
UK Hip Hop/R&B (Official Charts)	1
US Billboard Hot 100	1
US Dance Singles Sales (Billboard)	18
US Hot R&B/Hip-Hop Songs (Billboard)	4
US Pop Airplay (Billboard)	3
US Rhythmic Airplay (Billboard)	10

=== Year-end charts ===
Year-end chart performance for "Unpretty"
Chart (1999)	Position
Australia (ARIA)	37
Belgium (Ultratop 50 Flanders)	97
Canada Top Singles (RPM)	22
Canada Adult Contemporary (RPM)	79
Canada Dance/Urban (RPM)	33
Europe (Eurochart Hot 100)	62
Germany (Media Control)	96
Netherlands (Dutch Top 40)	33
Netherlands (Single Top 100)	95
New Zealand (RIANZ)	11
Romania (Romanian Top 100)	29
Sweden (Hitlistan)	50
UK Singles (OCC)	85
UK Airplay (Music Week)	14
US Billboard Hot 100	20
US Hot R&B/Hip-Hop Singles & Tracks (Billboard)	57
US Mainstream Top 40 (Billboard)	17
US Rhythmic Top 40 (Billboard)	24

=== Decade-end charts ===
Decade-end chart performance for "Unpretty"
Chart (1990–1999)	Position
US Billboard Hot 100	76

== Certifications ==
Certifications and sales for "Unpretty"
Region	Certification	Certified units/sales
Australia (ARIA)	Platinum	70,000^{^}
New Zealand (RMNZ)	Gold	5,000^{*}
Sweden (GLF)	Platinum	30,000^{^}
United Kingdom (BPI)	Silver	200,000^{^}
United States (RIAA)	Gold	500,000^{^}
^{*} Sales figures based on certification alone.^{^} Shipments figures based on certification alone.

== Release history ==
Release dates and formats for "Unpretty"
Region	Date	Format(s)	Label(s)	Ref.
United States	May 17, 1999	Urban contemporary radio	LaFace; Arista	
United States	June 1, 1999	Rhythmic contemporary radio	LaFace; Arista	
United States	July 27, 1999	Urban adult contemporary radio	LaFace; Arista	
Sweden	August 2, 1999	CD single	LaFace; Arista	
United States	August 10, 1999	12-inch single; CD single; cassette single	LaFace; Arista	
United Kingdom	August 16, 1999	12-inch single; CD single; cassette single		
France	September 21, 1999	CD single	Arista; BMG	
