= Scout Niblett =

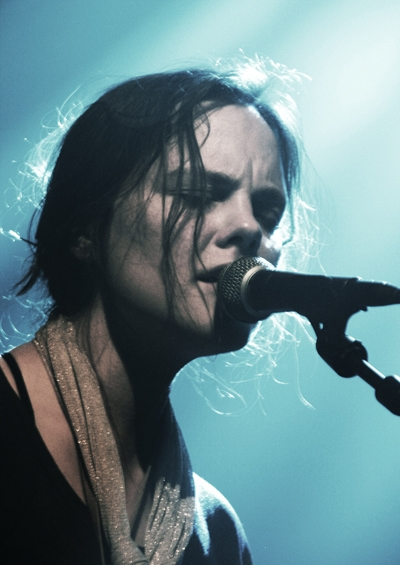
- Niblett performing in 2008

Background information
- Born: Emma Louise Niblett; 29 September 1973 (age 52); Stone, Staffordshire, England
- Origin: Nottingham, Nottinghamshire, England
- Genres: Indie rock; alternative rock; blues rock; folk rock
- Occupations: Singer; songwriter; musician
- Instruments: Vocals; guitar; drums
- Years active: 2001–present
- Labels: Secretly Canadian; Too Pure; Drag City
- Website: ScoutNiblett.com

Emma Louise Niblett (born 29 September 1973), better known by the stage name Scout Niblett, is an English singer, songwriter, and multi-instrumentalist. Niblett debuted in 2001 with her first full-length studio album Sweet Heart Fever, and has gone on to release five more studio albums. In 2013, Niblett released her sixth studio album, It's Up to Emma, which she mixed and produced.

Niblett's music is frequently minimalist in style, many of her songs consisting merely of vocals accompanied by either drums or guitar. She is also known for her intimate live shows. In addition to songwriting and music, Niblett is also a professional astrologer, and often incorporates astrological themes into her song lyrics.

== Early life and education ==
Niblett was born in Stone, Staffordshire, England, and was raised in the nearby historic market town of Rugeley. She was classically trained on piano and violin as a child. Niblett began recording compositions she made up on the piano as a child, and later in early adulthood on the guitar. She studied music, fine art and performance art at Nottingham Trent University.

== Career ==
=== 2000s ===
Niblett began performing at clubs in Nottingham while attending college. She chose her stage name in honour of Jean Louise "Scout" Finch, the protagonist in Harper Lee's 1960 novel To Kill a Mockingbird.

After sending out her EP demo CD "Alene Had It All" (recorded under the name Lion, and accompanied by drummer Kristian Godard), consisting of vocals, guitar, and drums, to multiple record companies, Niblett was approached by Secretly Canadian, who had been given her demos by Jason Molina of Songs: Ohia. The following year, Niblett released a 7" split-single with Songs: Ohia, contributing the track "Miss My Lion". Niblett followed the single with her debut album, Sweet Heart Fever, released by Secretly Canadian in 2001, which she recorded at Chem Nineteen Recordings in Hamilton, Scotland with producer Andy Miller.

Her follow-up release was a one-sided 10" EP, I Conjure Series, recorded live, where Niblett plays all the instruments herself.

Niblett relocated to the United States in 2003 to continue pursuing a music career, saying: "The underground music culture in America is big enough so that you can make a living from it without being super famous. The mainstream culture of music [in England] is so different, because it's all based on selling things... In America you don't have to enter into that, you can still survive. You don't have to be in the industry there and you do [in England], so I had to leave". She has resided in Portland, Oregon since 2005.

=== 2010s ===
In 2010, Niblett released her fifth studio album, The Calcination of Scout Niblett, marking her debut release with Drag City. The album received positive critical reviews from Pitchfork and Spin, who noted: "[Niblett's] minimal songs – just one guitar and sporadic drums – unfold laboriously, as though forcing themselves from Niblett's clenched mouth and hands." Niblett followed this with a single, No More Nasty Scrubs, in 2012, which featured covers of TLC's "No Scrubs" and "Nasty" by Janet Jackson. Her sixth studio album, It's Up to Emma, which she recorded in Portland, Oregon, and mixed the record herself. It was released on 21 May 2013 also on Drag City, and received critical acclaim from Pitchfork, Allmusic, and NME.

== Music and influences ==
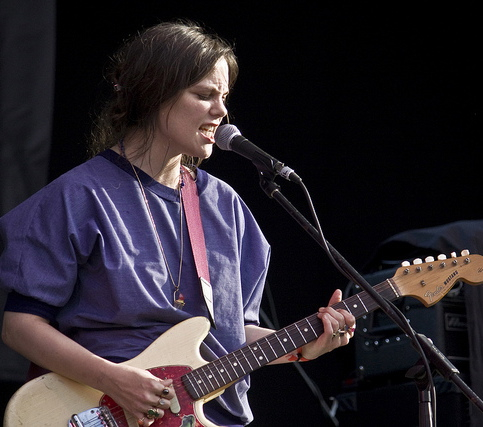
Niblett live at Primavera Sound Festival, 2010

Niblett's unorthodox musical arrangements have been noted by critics, particularly her sparse instrumentation and dramatic shifts in tempos. In her earlier work, specifically I Am and Kidnapped by Neptune, many of Niblett's songs consisted of vocals accompanied only by drums; "[I wanted to] make drumming and singing be as accessible as me playing guitar and singing," she said in a 2004 interview. Her later albums featured Niblett mainly on guitar, and with a backing drummer.

Niblett cites among her influences a number of grunge period bands, including Mudhoney, Sonic Youth and Nirvana, and in particular the guitar of Kurt Cobain. She also stated that she was largely influenced by Hole's first record, Pretty on the Inside (1991): "I was seventeen when I first heard it. For me, the thing that I loved about them and her (Courtney Love) was the anger, and aggressiveness, along with the tender side," said Niblett. "That was something I hadn't seen before in a woman playing music. That was hugely influential and really inspiring. Women up 'til then were kind of one-dimensional, twee, sweet, [and] ethereal."

Her drumming technique, however, is inspired, she says, by a man who played at an open-mic night in Nottingham and would accompany himself on the drums while playing Beatles covers. This drumming technique has been a particularly distinctive feature of Niblett's records with Steve Albini, whose method was to place the drums centrally in the mix. An example of Niblett's minimalist approach to songwriting is "Your Beat Kicks Back Like Death", included on I Am and as the B-side to "I'll Be a Prince." It consists solely of a drumbeat with a cheerfully delivered repeating lyric, "We're all gonna die!", eventually concluding, "We don't know when, We don't know how." According to Niblett, she had originally composed the song on guitar after nearly getting in a car accident while on tour during a winter storm. Also of note is her downbeat cover of Althea & Donna's 1978 reggae hit "Uptown Top Ranking", which Niblett released as a single after it became popular at live performances.

Niblett has also cited Daniel Johnston as a lyrical influence, and her music has often been likened by critics to PJ Harvey, Cat Power, and Courtney Love. During the recording of her sixth album, It's Up to Emma, Niblett stated that she listened to Black Flag and the Rollins Band for inspiration.

== Personal life ==
Niblett seldom discusses her personal life. Apart from her career in music, she has an obsessive interest in astrology and is also a professional astrologer. "My dad bought me a book about astrology when I was about seven and I literally haven't stopped studying it since," she said. Themes and references to planets occasionally appear in Niblett's lyrics, and she explained the naming of her third album, Kidnapped by Neptune: "The reason that album was called Kidnapped by Neptune was because Neptune was what they call 'transiting my ascendant' at the time and it literally did feel like I didn't know who I was. The energies of Neptune are dissolving your ego and it really kind of shakes you up. Right now Pluto, but also Uranus are equally battling, challenging my Sun." She also is said to use astrology to predict the best place and time to record her music.

== Discography ==
Albums

- Sweet Heart Fever (2001)
- I Am (2003)
- Kidnapped by Neptune (2005)
- This Fool Can Die Now (2007)
- The Calcination of Scout Niblett (2010)
- It's Up to Emma (2013)
