= This Fool Can Die Now =

Studio album by Scout Niblett
- Released: October 15, 2007
- Genre: Indie rock, alternative rock
- Length: 55:42
- Label: Too Pure
- Producer: Steve Albini

Scout Niblett chronology
| Kidnapped by Neptune (2005) | This Fool Can Die Now (2007) | The Calcination of Scout Niblett (2010) |

Singles from This Fool Can Die Now
- 1. "Kiss" Released: November 20, 2007; 2. "Dinosaur Egg" Released: May 22, 2007

This Fool Can Die Now is the fourth studio album by singer-songwriter Scout Niblett, released on Too Pure records. The album was Niblett's third collaboration with producer Steve Albini. The album also features several duets and collaborations with Will Oldham.

== Track listing ==
All tracks are written by Scout Niblett, unless otherwise noted.

| No. | Title | Writer(s) | Length |
|---|---|---|---|
| 1. | "Do You Want to Be Buried with My People?" (ft. Will Oldham) | Traditional | 5:41 |
| 2. | "Kiss" (ft. Will Oldham) | | 6:09 |
| 3. | "Moon Lake" | | 2:01 |
| 4. | "Let Thine Heart Be Warned" | | 3:46 |
| 5. | "Your Last Chariot" | | 2:33 |
| 6. | "Black Hearted Queen" | | 3:31 |
| 7. | "River of No Return" (ft. Will Oldham) | Lionel Newman | 2:35 |
| 8. | "Nevada" | | 5:27 |
| 9. | "Baby Emma" | | 3:32 |
| 10. | "Yummy" | | 4:34 |
| 11. | "Dinosaur Egg" | Niblett, David Shrigley | 3:51 |
| 12. | "Hide and Seek" | | 5:07 |
| 13. | "Comfort You" (ft. Will Oldham) | Van Morrison | 2:53 |
| 14. | "Fishes and Honey" | | 4:02 |
| Total length: | | | 55:42 |

== Personnel ==
- Scout Niblett - vocals, guitar, drums
- Alison Chesley - cello
- Kristian Goddard - drums
- Will Oldham - vocals (tracks 1–2, 7, 13), guitar
- Chris Saligoe - guitar
- Susan Voelz - violin, vocals

Technical personnel

- Steve Albini - engineer
