= The Calcination of Scout Niblett =

Studio album by Scout Niblett
- Released: January 26, 2010
- Genre: Indie rock, alternative rock
- Length: 51:17
- Label: Drag City
- Producer: Steve Albini

Scout Niblett chronology
This Fool Can Die Now (2007)	The Calcination of Scout Niblett (2010)	It's Up to Emma (2013)

Singles from The Calcination of Scout Niblett
- 1. "The Calcination of Scout Niblett" Released: July 20, 2010

The Calcination of Scout Niblett is the fifth studio album by singer-songwriter Scout Niblett, and was her first release on Drag City records. The album was Niblett's fourth collaboration with producer Steve Albini.

Professional ratings
Review scores
Source	Rating
Allmusic	4.5/5 stars
Pitchfork	7.3/10 stars
Spin	8/10 stars

== Track listing ==
All tracks are written by Scout Niblett.

No.	Title	Length
1.	"Just Do It!"	5:28
2.	"The Calcination of Scout Niblett"	3:31
3.	"I.B.D."	4:34
4.	"Bargin"	4:54
5.	"Cherry Cheek Bomb"	6:28
6.	"Kings"	4:38
7.	"Lucy Lucifer"	1:51
8.	"Duke of Anxiety"	2:14
9.	"Ripe with Life"	5:32
10.	"Strip Me Pluto"	3:06
11.	"Meet and Greet"	9:01
Total length:		51:17

== Personnel ==
- Scout Niblett - vocals, guitar, drums

Technical personnel

- Steve Albini - engineer
- Dylan Long - photography (cover art)
