= It's Up to Emma =

Studio album by Scout Niblett
- Released: May 21, 2013
- Recorded: 2012 at Type Foundry and Cloud City Sound in Portland, Oregon
- Genre: Indie rock, alternative rock
- Length: 44:19
- Label: Drag City
- Producer: Scout Niblett

Scout Niblett chronology
The Calcination of Scout Niblett (2010)	It's Up to Emma (2013)

Singles from It's Up to Emma
- 1. "No Scrubs" Released: November 6, 2012

It's Up to Emma is the sixth studio album by singer-songwriter Scout Niblett, released on May 21, 2013. It is Niblett's second release on Drag City records, after The Calcination of Scout Niblett in 2010. It's Up to Emma met with positive reception from indie rock critics upon release.

== Writing and production ==
Niblett recorded It's Up to Emma at Type Foundry and Cloud City Sound in Portland, Oregon, as well as in New York City and in Niblett's residence. Unlike on her previous albums, Niblett chiefly produced the record as well as mixed it.

Niblett described the writing of the album as: "I think for me, [it] seems to be a reflection of a journey through all emotions. It feels like a document of an emotional evolution. Almost like the different stages of grief (anger, denial, acceptance, etc.), all about the same theme [...] The songs are really me dealing with being alone, and the path I took to learning to embrace and value being alone."

== Reception ==
Professional ratings
Review scores
Source	Rating
Allmusic	4/5 stars
NME	6/10 stars
Pitchfork	7.6/10
Willamette Week	(positive)

It's Up to Emma received positive critical acclaim from critics upon its release. Pitchfork called the album "the most listenable record Niblett has made since her debut; caustic in a totally different way than usual," and Allmusic noted that the songs "add up to a reckoning, an exorcism, and a letting go. Using ragged guitar riffs, basic drumming, some raw-sounding strings, and a deliberate lack of subtlety, Niblett goes straight at her subject." The Willamette Week echoed a similar sentiment, stating: "Don’t be fooled by the picture on the cover of Scout Niblett’s new album, a photo-booth shot of a couple in full make-out mode. The heart of It’s Up to Emma is not a romantic one. These nine brooding, deeply scarred songs—eight originals and one well-chosen cover—are performed and sung as a form of personal exorcism for Niblett."

== Track listing ==
All tracks are written by Scout Niblett, unless otherwise noted

No.	Title	Writer(s)	Length
1.	"Gun"		4:57
2.	"Can't Fool Me Now"		6:19
3.	"My Man"		4:43
4.	"Second Chance Dreams"		4:45
5.	"Woman and Man"		4:07
6.	"All Night Long"		4:11
7.	"No Scrubs"	Kevin Briggs, Kandi Burruss, Tameka Cottle, Lisa "Left Eye" Lopes	3:20
8.	"Could This Possibly Be?"		5:21
9.	"What Can I Do?"		6:36
Total length:			44:19

== Personnel ==
- Scout Niblett - vocals, guitar, bass, e-bow
- Dan Wilson - drums, lead guitar
- Jose Medels - drums, percussion
- Emil Amos - bass, drums, e-bow, backing vocals

Technical personnel

- Scout Niblett - production, mixing
- Danny Bensi - engineer, strings
- Brandon Eggleston - engineer, mixing
- Saunder Jurriaans - engineer, strings
- Jason Powers - engineer, mixing
- Carl Saff - mastering
- Adam Selzer - mixing
