= I'm Good at Being Bad =

1999 song by TLC

Promotional single by TLC

from the album FanMail
- Released: January 23, 1999
- Recorded: 1998
- Studio: Flyte Tyme, Edina, Minnesota
- Genre: R&B
- Length: 5:25 (original clean version); 5:39 (original explicit version); 4:39 (re-edited album version)
- Label: LaFace
- Songwriters: James Harris III; Terry Lewis; Tony "Prof-T" Tolbert; Tionne Watkins; Lisa Lopes; Marshall L. Martin; Giorgio Moroder; Pete Belotte; Donna Summer; Morris Dickerson; Charles Miller; Sylvester Allen; Harold Brown; Howard Scott; Lee Oskar; Leroy Jordan
- Producer: Jimmy Jam and Terry Lewis

"I'm Good at Being Bad" is a song recorded by American girl group TLC for their third album FanMail. It was released as a promotional single when "No Scrubs" was distributed to radio. Despite not being commercially released, the track peaked within the top 40 on the Billboard Hot R&B/Hip-Hop Songs chart. The song is characterized by its contrasting alternation of soft romantic melody and hard rap with explicit lyrics, as performed by Tionne "T-Boz" Watkins and others of the group.

== Background and composition ==
"I'm Good at Being Bad" is an R&B song containing a rap verse. The song's original title was "Bitch Like Me" (a phrase also in the lyrics), which was described to "crank up the raunch level". The lyrics refer graphically to "Ten-inch or bigger / A lick-it-from-the-back-type nigga [sic]."

It was recorded at Flyte Tyme Studios in Edina, Minnesota, with producers Jimmy Jam and Terry Lewis in 1998. While writing the song, member Tionne "T-Boz" Watkins was inspired by grunge band Nirvana's use of loud and soft dynamic shifts in their discography, which she wanted the group to incorporate.

Jimmy Jam encouraged Watkins to hum the melody while playing the beat in the recording booth, which was different from her routine of listening to the beat and writing out the lyrics. Watkins admitted that the technique influenced her as a songwriter. She also attempted to convince Lisa "Left-Eye" Lopes to rap the pre-chorus herself, but Lopes insisted that Watkins' thicker voice was better suited for the track.

The original album version interpolates the Donna Summer song "Love to Love You Baby". Later pressings of the explicit version of album removed the interpolation, shortening the song's length by a minute, though the interpolation remained on the edited versions of the album. The song also used a sample by American funk band War's 1972 song "Slippin' Into Darkness". Lopes' rap verse was included in the uncut version of the "Unpretty" music video.

== Commercial performance ==
The song was distributed to radio stations as a promotional single during the release of their first single "No Scrubs" on January 23, 1999. On the Billboard Hot R&B/Hip-Hop Songs chart dated July 3, 1999, "I'm Good at Being Bad" peaked at number 38, where it spent 18 weeks on the chart.

== Track listing ==
Promotional US mini CD single and maxi single

1. "I'm Good at Being Bad" (Radio Mix with rap) – 4:33
2. "I'm Good at Being Bad" (Radio Mix without rap) – 4:33
3. "I'm Good at Being Bad" (Instrumental) – 4:36
4. "I'm Good at Being Bad" (Call Out Research Hook) – 0:10

Promotional US 12-inch single

1. "I'm Good at Being Bad" (dirty version) – 4:39
2. "I'm Good at Being Bad" (clean version) – 4:42
3. "I'm Good at Being Bad" (instrumental) – 4:35

== Charts ==
Chart (1999)	Peak position
US Hot R&B/Hip-Hop Songs (Billboard)	38
