= No Scrubs =

1999 single by TLC

Single by TLC

from the album FanMail
- B-side: "Silly Ho"
- Released: February 2, 1999
- Studio: D.A.R.P. (Atlanta, Georgia)
- Genre: R&B; hip-pop
- Length: 3:39 (album version); 3:59 (radio mix); 3:39 (main mix)
- Label: LaFace; Arista
- Songwriters: Kevin "She'kspere" Briggs; Kandi Burruss; Tameka "Tiny" Cottle; Lisa Lopes (Note: Rap version)
- Producer: She'kspere

TLC singles chronology
"Diggin' on You" (1995)	"No Scrubs" (1999)	"Unpretty" (1999)

Music video
- "No Scrubs" on YouTube

"No Scrubs" is a song recorded by American girl group TLC as the lead single from their third studio album, FanMail, released on February 2, 1999, by LaFace Records and Arista Records. The song was written by producer Kevin "She'kspere" Briggs and former Xscape members Kandi Burruss and Tameka "Tiny" Cottle, with TLC member Lisa "Left Eye" Lopes contributing lyrics to the rap version. The song lyrics describe the role of a man in a relationship. Rozonda "Chilli" Thomas sings the lead vocals for the first time on a TLC single. The song popularized the slang term "scrub" worldwide.

"No Scrubs" became TLC's third number-one single and eighth top 10 single on the US Billboard Hot 100, where it peaked for four consecutive weeks. It was ranked number two on Billboard's year-end Hot 100 singles chart of 1999, behind Cher's "Believe" (1998). The song won Best R&B Performance by a Duo or Group With Vocal and Best R&B Song at 42nd Annual Grammy Awards. The Hype Williams-directed music video was released in 1999, which depicted the three members dancing inside a space station. It was compared to other music videos such as "Scream" (1995) and "What's It Gonna Be?!" (1999).

The poverty-shaming of "No Scrubs" generated divisive attention following its release, prompting several answer songs, such as "No Pigeons" by hip hop group Sporty Thievz.

== Background and development ==
"No Scrubs" was initially written by Kandi Burruss on an envelope while sitting in her car. The lyrics allude to a previous relationship Tameka Cottle described as a "screw-up". Burruss took her idea to Cottle, who loved the freestyle. Together, they fleshed out the entire song and recorded a demo, thinking they'd keep it for their own upcoming joint project. However, Dallas Austin gave the song to TLC as their first single for FanMail, with Rozonda "Chilli" Thomas singing the lead vocals. He regarded the song as a breakthrough for Thomas.

"No Scrubs" was written by Burruss, Cottle and producer Kevin "She'kspere" Briggs, with background vocals provided by Thomas, Burruss, Cottle, and Debra Killings. The lyrics were modified slightly to match TLC's image. Two versions of the song were released to boost airplay across formats, one described as straight R&B, the other containing a rap verse from TLC member Lisa "Left Eye" Lopes.

"No Scrubs" was released on February 2, 1999, as the lead single of FanMail.

== Composition and lyrics ==
"No Scrubs"
A 22-second sample of the R&B and hip-pop song containing Chilli's vocals layered over an electronic guitar.

"No Scrubs" is an R&B and hip-pop song, containing a prominent Kurzweil Acoustic Guitar beat. It has "airy remnants of an electronic guitar", followed by Chilli's vocals. The word "scrub" was used in Atlanta as a slang term for an unsuccessful person of low social status. Natelegé Whaley of Vibe stated that the song is "a scathing critique on men at the bottom of the dating pool". Musicnotes published this song in 4/4 common time with a moderate tempo indicating 100 beats per minute in the key of G♯ minor, with a vocal range spanning from F♯_{3} to C♯_{5}.

== Critical reception ==
John Dingwall from Daily Record described "No Scrubs" as a "slinky, acoustic R&B smash". Stevie Chick from NME stated that the song is "the best song ever about not wanting to sleep with someone you're not attracted to in the first place", acknowledging that it is "soulful, simple and quietly witty". In 1999, it was listed on The Village Voice's annual poll Pazz & Jop at number one. "No Scrubs" placed at number two on NME's Top Tracks of 1999 list, and at number 45 on their list of 100 Best Songs of the 1990s. Rolling Stone ranked the song at number 10 in their list of the 50 Best Songs of the Nineties, and at number 303 on their list of the Top 500 Greatest Songs of All Time. Additionally, VH1 listed "No Scrubs" at number 22 in their list of the 40 Greatest R&B Songs of the 90s, ranking behind the band's 1995 international single "Waterfalls", which placed at number 6. Billboard ranked "No Scrubs" at number 42 on their listicle of 100 Greatest Girl Group Songs of All Time.

== Commercial performance ==
"No Scrubs" was commercially released on March 23, 1999, after it was distributed to radio. It peaked at number one on the Billboard Hot 100 upon the single's release on the Billboard issue dated April 3, 1999, where it remained for four weeks from April 10, 1999, to May 1, 1999. The song charted in the top-ten of the Hot 100 for 17 consecutive weeks. The song's airplay was at the time, the first to peak with over 140 million audience impressions, and was crowned the Top Airplay Song of 1999. It holds the record for most weeks at number one on the Rhythmic Top 40 with 15 weeks, as well as being ranked at number two on Billboard's Year-End Hot 100 singles of 1999, only behind Cher's 1998 song "Believe".

In Australia, "No Scrubs" spent seven consecutive weeks at the summit of the ARIA Charts from May 2, 1999, to June 20, 1999. In the United Kingdom, it peaked at number three on the UK Singles Chart, becoming TLC's highest-charting single. The song was certified quadruple platinum by the British Phonographic Industry (BPI) in September 2023 for sales and streams exceeding 2,400,000 units.

In Europe also, the track was a massive hit, topping the Polish Singles Chart and reached the top five in Belgium, Greece, the Netherlands, Denmark, France and Sweden.

== Music video ==
=== Background ===
The Hype Williams-directed music video was set in a futuristic space station, where the trio wore silver and black metallic outfits. It contains a rap verse by Left Eye, which was used in the single's release. Tionne "T-Boz" Watkins described how the group went all out during production of the video, with her being specifically excited about "wearing the all-white outfit", while Thomas initially felt apprehensive about going on the swing, constantly practicing before the shoot until she did not want to get off afterwards. The scene at the end of the video showing the three fighting each other and being silly was a result of the tube moving and the group attempting to fight against the moving set, with Thomas and Lopes hitting each other by accident. American drag queen RuPaul also appeared off-camera without drag to see them, as his makeup artist Mathu Andersen was in charge of makeup for the group, placing rhinestones on the lips of each member. The music video is stylistically similar to Michael Jackson and Janet Jackson's music video "Scream" (1995), as well as the Busta Rhymes and Janet Jackson music video "What's It Gonna Be?!" (1999), which was also directed by Williams.

=== Synopsis ===
The video features the women in four different colored space-suits: white, black, silver, and Left Eye in blue. When there are shots of the women together they have two different outfits: black and silver. T-Boz's hair is fuchsia in the video. It includes a dance sequence where the women dance in front of the "TLC" logo, and also features several scenes of Chilli on a swing. As Left Eye's rap begins, she is positioned in a garage wearing white clothes, and practicing martial arts in a futuristic blue outfit in a separate scene. She is filmed by a drone as she continues rapping; "Can't forget the focus on the picture in front of me/You as clear as DVD on digital TV screens." The final scene shows TLC fighting each other, while also dancing and having fun.

=== Reception ===
The futuristic music video allowed TLC to win the MTV Video Music Award for Best Group Video at the 1999 MTV Video Music Awards over all-male nominees such as the Backstreet Boys and NSYNC. Writing for Stereogum in 2019, Nate Patrin compared the video's CGI space backgrounds to the Y2K problem, and described it as a message sent from an unreachable future because of a "class struggle that [had not] yet invaded the popular imagination".

== Legacy ==
=== Reactions ===
Following the immediate release of "No Scrubs" in 1999, the song received a divisive response about labeling a new term for men "with limited money, ambitions and romantic vocabulary, and who mostly still live at home with Mom", with several debates on radio stations, and airplay of answer songs. Such songs included DJ Quik's single "Sexuality" from his 2000 album Balance & Options, "No Hoochies" in San Francisco, and "No Pigeons" by rap group Sporty Thievz in New York throughout April 1999. Thomas claimed that the latter group were threatened by the song's success, stating that "they can't take the heat!". The use of the word "scrub" rapidly spread worldwide, which was commonly used by women. Writing for The Washington Post, Lonnae O'Neal Parker noted that "No Scrubs" served as social commentary in the vein of previous songs such as Madonna's 1985 song "Material Girl" and Gwen Guthrie's 1986 song "Ain't Nothin' Goin' On but the Rent", stating that it culminated from 20 years of misogyny in rap music.

=== Covers and samples ===
American singer-songwriter Avi Wisnia performed a cover version of "No Scrubs", which was included on his 2010 studio album Something New. Pop duo Karmin covered the song in 2011, shortly before releasing "Crash Your Party", which integrated the former song to the retro sample of "The Choice Is Yours (Revisited)" in the latter song. Kelly Clarkson performed "No Scrubs" during her 2012 Summer Tour on August 23, 2012. The cast of American television series Glee covered the song in the "Sadie Hawkins" episode of the show's fourth season, by members Kevin McHale, Chord Overstreet, Blake Jenner, Samuel Larsen and Darren Criss. English singer Scout Niblett included a cover of "No Scrubs" on her sixth studio album It's Up to Emma (2013). Pop rock band Bastille released a mashup of "No Scrubs" and "Angels" by the xx titled "No Angels", which was included on their second mixtape, Other People's Heartache (2012). They performed the former song at the 2014 Governors Ball Music Festival. American country singer Kacey Musgraves performed the song during her 2014 tour "Same Tour, Different Trailer". In January 2019, Weezer included a cover of "No Scrubs" on their twelfth studio album, Teal Album. The song "BasicBitchTearGas" from JPEGMafia's third studio album All My Heroes Are Cornballs (2019), is a cover of "No Scrubs".

American electronic dance music producer XXYYXX sampled "No Scrubs" on "Good Enough", which was included on his album XXYYXX (2012). Producer Le Youth sampled it on the 2013 song "Dance with Me", which peaked at number 11 on the UK Singles Chart. The "No Scrubs" writers were credited on Ed Sheeran's 2017 song "Shape of You", as it contained a similar lyrical rhythm. Swedish record producer Avicii also credited the writers on his 2019 song "SOS", as American singer Aloe Blacc interpolated the lyrics, "I don't want no scrub" to "I don't need my drugs". The song was sampled on "Bobo" in 2021, which was performed by American singer Mariah Angeliq, Spanish singer Bad Gyal, and Argentine singer María Becerra. According to Billboard writer Jessica Roiz, it gave "No Scrubs" a "reggaeton twist" with perreo, urban-pop sounds and dancehall vibes. The song peaked at number 41 in Spain, and at number 96 in Argentina. American rapper Doechii interpolated "No Scrubs" in her 2023 song "What It Is (Block Boy)", which featured rapper Kodak Black on its original version, and peaked at number 29 on the Billboard Hot 100.

== Track listings ==
US CD and cassette single

No.	Title	Length
1.	"No Scrubs" (Album Version) (Dirty)	3:39
2.	"No Scrubs" (Instrumental)	3:37

US 12-inch single

Side A
No.	Title	Length
1.	"No Scrubs" (Album Version)	3:39
2.	"No Scrubs" (With Rap)	3:59
3.	"No Scrubs" (Instrumental)	3:37

Side B
No.	Title	Length
1.	"Silly Ho" (Album Version)	4:13
2.	"Silly Ho" (Instrumental)	4:13

International maxi single

No.	Title	Length
1.	"No Scrubs" (Album Version)	3:37
2.	"No Scrubs" (Main Mix)	3:59
3.	"No Scrubs" (Instrumental)	3:37
4.	"Silly Ho" (Album Version)	4:13

European 12-inch single

Side A
No.	Title	Length
1.	"No Scrubs" (Main Mix)	3:59

Side B
No.	Title	Length
1.	"Silly Ho" (Album Version)	4:15
2.	"No Scrubs" (Instrumental)	3:39

UK CD1

No.	Title	Length
1.	"No Scrubs" (Album Version)	3:39
2.	"No Scrubs" (Main Mix)	3:59
3.	"Silly Ho" (Album Version)	4:13

UK CD2

No.	Title	Length
1.	"No Scrubs" (Album Version)	3:39
2.	"Waterfalls" (Radio Version)	4:19
3.	"Creep" (Radio Version)	4:26

French CD single

No.	Title	Length
1.	"No Scrubs"	3:35
2.	"Silly Ho"	4:15
3.	"Waterfalls"	4:36

== Credits and personnel ==
Credits adapted from the back cover of "No Scrubs".

Production

- Produced by Kevin "Shekspere" Briggs for Shekspere Productions, Inc. and D.A.R.P. Inc.
- Recorded by Carlton Lynn at D.A.R.P. Studios, Atlanta, Georgia
- Assisted by Ty Hudson
- Mixed by Leslie Braithwaite at D.A.R.P. Studios
- Assisted by Vernon J. Mungo
- Background vocals by Rozonda "Chilli" Thomas, Tionne "T-Boz" Watkins, Debra Killings, Kandi Burruss and Tameka "Tiny" Cottle
- MIDI and sound design by Shekspere for Shekspere Productions, Inc.
- Mastered by Herb Powers at Powers House of Sound, New York

Executive producers

- Antonio M. Reid
- Kenneth B. Edmonds
- Dallas Austin
- TLC

Artwork

- Art director – Darrick "O.L." Warfield
- Creative coordinator – Cherie O'Brien
- Photography – Seb Janiak

== Charts ==
=== Weekly charts ===
Weekly chart performance for "No Scrubs"
Chart (1999)	Peak position
Australia (ARIA)	1
Austria (Ö3 Austria Top 40)	26
Belgium (Ultratop 50 Flanders)	5
Belgium (Ultratop 50 Wallonia)	3
Canada Top Singles (RPM)	1
Canada Adult Contemporary (RPM)	27
Canada Dance/Urban (RPM)	1
Denmark (IFPI)	5
Europe (Eurochart Hot 100)	2
France (SNEP)	5
Germany (GfK)	4
Greece (IFPI)	4
Iceland (Íslenski Listinn Topp 40)	11
Ireland (IRMA)	1
Italy (Musica e dischi)	7
Netherlands (Dutch Top 40)	3
Netherlands (Single Top 100)	3
New Zealand (Recorded Music NZ)	1
Norway (VG-lista)	7
Poland Airplay (Music & Media)	1
Scottish Singles Sales (Official Charts)	11
Spain (Promusicae)	7
Sweden (Sverigetopplistan)	16
Switzerland (Schweizer Hitparade)	5
UK Singles (Official Charts)	3
UK Airplay (Music Week)	5
UK Hip Hop/R&B (Official Charts)	1
US Billboard Hot 100	1
US Adult Pop Airplay (Billboard)	39
US Hot R&B/Hip-Hop Songs (Billboard)	1
US Pop Airplay (Billboard)	1
US Rhythmic Airplay (Billboard)	1

2026 chart performance for "No Scrubs"
Chart (2026)	Peak position
Global 200 (Billboard)	68
Ireland (IRMA)	40
Philippines Hot 100 (Billboard Philippines)	79
UK Singles (Official Charts)	23

=== Year-end charts ===
Year-end chart performance for "No Scrubs"
Chart (1999)	Position
Australia (ARIA)	12
Belgium (Ultratop 50 Flanders)	32
Belgium (Ultratop 50 Wallonia)	16
Canada Top Singles (RPM)	5
Canada Dance/Urban (RPM)	1
Europe (European Hot 100 Singles)	16
France (SNEP)	21
Germany (Media Control)	27
Netherlands (Dutch Top 40)	16
Netherlands (Single Top 100)	19
New Zealand (RIANZ)	8
Norway End of School Period (VG-lista)	9
Romania (Romanian Top 100)	9
Sweden (Hitlistan)	60
Switzerland (Schweizer Hitparade)	23
UK Singles (OCC)	16
UK Airplay (Music Week)	10
UK Urban (Music Week)	3
US Billboard Hot 100	2
US Hot R&B/Hip-Hop Singles & Tracks (Billboard)	4
US Mainstream Top 40 (Billboard)	6
US Rhythmic Top 40 (Billboard)	1

=== Decade-end charts ===
Decade-end chart performance for "No Scrubs"
Chart (1990–1999)	Position
US Billboard Hot 100	33

== Certifications ==
Certifications for "No Scrubs"
Region	Certification	Certified units/sales
Australia (ARIA)	Platinum	70,000^{^}
Belgium (BRMA)	Platinum	50,000^{*}
Denmark (IFPI Danmark)	Platinum	90,000^{‡}
France (SNEP)	Gold	250,000^{*}
Germany (BVMI)	Gold	250,000^{‡}
Italy (FIMI)	Gold	25,000^{‡}
New Zealand (RMNZ)	9× Platinum	270,000^{‡}
Portugal (AFP)	Platinum	25,000^{‡}
Spain (Promusicae)	Gold	30,000^{‡}
Sweden (GLF)	Gold	15,000^{^}
United Kingdom (BPI)	5× Platinum	3,472,933
United States (RIAA)	5× Platinum	5,000,000^{‡}
^{*} Sales figures based on certification alone.^{^} Shipments figures based on certification alone.^{‡} Sales+streaming figures based on certification alone.

== Release history ==
Release dates and formats for "No Scrubs"
Region	Date	Format(s)	Label	Ref.
United States	February 2, 1999	Rhythmic contemporary radio	LaFace; Arista	
United States	February 8, 1999	Urban contemporary radio	LaFace; Arista	
United Kingdom	March 22, 1999	12-inch single; cassette single; CD single	LaFace; Arista	
United States	March 23, 1999	12-inch single; cassette single; CD single	LaFace; Arista	
Japan	March 25, 1999	CD single	LaFace	
