= Fictitious telephone number =

Telephone number for use in fiction

Ranges for fictitious telephone numbers are common in most telephone numbering plans. One of the main reasons these ranges exist is to avoid accidentally using active telephone numbers in movies and television programs because of viewers frequently calling the numbers used. In North America, the area served by the North American Numbering Plan (NANP) system of area codes, fictitious telephone numbers are commonly associated with the 555 central office code. However, not all 555 numbers are fictitious. Only the range 555-0100 through 555-0199 is specifically reserved by the North American Numbering Plan Administrator for fictitious, non-working numbers used in entertainment and advertising; other 555 numbers may have real or special-purpose assignments. Other areas have different fictitious telephone numbers.

== Telephone numbers in movies, television and music ==
In the premiere episode of I Love Lucy, "The Girls Want to Go to a Nightclub" (1951), Lucy dials up Sam Zabaglione at Plaza 52099 (755-2099).

In 1963, Hawkshaw Hawkins recorded "Lonesome 7-7203", which would properly appear in a directory as LOnesome 7-7203.

In 1966, Wilson Pickett recorded "634-5789 (Soulsville, U.S.A.)", which also appears in the soundtrack of the movie Blues Brothers 2000. It has been covered by multiple artists including Tina Turner and Ry Cooder.

In the January 9, 1976 episode of Sanford and Son "Can You Chop This", Fred Sanford was promoting Whopper Choppers and asked callers to call the number 555-0179 in both the English and Spanish languages.

In 1979, the B-52's recorded the song "6060-842." The fictional exchange prefix "606" had a 0 in the second position. So-called "interchangeable central office codes" with 0's or 1's in the second or third positions were rare at the time, but they had been allowable under the North American Numbering Plan since the mid-1970s.

Tommy Tutone's hit 1982 song "867-5309/Jenny" identifies a working number in many area codes which continue to receive large numbers of calls asking for "Jenny" decades later.

In the 1992 film Sneakers, the NSA agent Mary gives her telephone number as (415) 273-9164.

In 1992, filmmaker Michael Moore unwittingly included footage of himself reciting his telephone number in the documentary Pets or Meat: The Return to Flint. He received 314 calls in just the first day following its broadcast on PBS.

The all-girl singing group The Marvelettes had an early Motown hit record in 1962 with "Beechwood 4-5789", written by Marvin Gaye, William "Mickey" Stevenson and George Gordy. The song became a hit again two decades later when it was covered by The Carpenters in 1982.

The makers of 2003 film Bruce Almighty used 776-2323 as a telephone number for God (played by Morgan Freeman). This number remains unassigned in 1 (716) Buffalo (where the film is set). 776 is not a fictitious exchange in other area codes, where subscribers with the matching number were inundated with callers asking for "God". In Colorado the calls were misdirected to KDMN radio; in Sanford, North Carolina the number belongs to a church. In the UK the number belonged to a mobile phone and in Florida to a shop owner who received up to 20 calls per hour. 776-2323 was ultimately replaced with a 555 number for television airings of the movie and on most copies of the DVD.

"777-9311" by The Time used Dez Dickerson's actual telephone number at the time the song was written, causing his telephone to ring incessantly until he had his number changed.

In Germany, the 1981 Spider Murphy Gang song "Skandal im Sperrbezirk" ("Scandal in the Blocked Zone") contains a telephone number, zweiunddreißig, sechzehn, acht: 32 16 8. The number is that of a Munich prostitute who operates in the "blocked zone", the area of the city center where street prostitutes were forbidden. The band checked that the telephone number was not assigned in Munich, but it was assigned in some other cities. The song was a hit, topping the charts in Germany for 36 weeks; it was #1 in Austria (16 weeks) and Switzerland (11 weeks) as well. It has become an Oktoberfest staple. Singer Günther Sigl said in an interview that the song became "at one time, the most famous telephone number in Germany." He added: "As an apology, we paid for some number changes and sent numerous bouquets."

In the song of Russian group "Aquarium(Аквариум)" "212-85-06"(1985) from album "Дети Декабря" the number 212-85-06 was used. Now the St. Petersburg Rector's Office is using this number.

In 2004, the episode "My Malpractical Decision" of Scrubs gave the character Dr. Turk's telephone number as (916) CALL-TUR[K], i.e. (916) 225-5887, with an extraneous 5 at the end to make Turk's full name. (J.D. comments, "I'll always dial the 'K' for you.") This was for a time an active cellphone number, which would play a message urging fans to keep watching the show and to vote for it at the People's Choice Awards. Occasionally it was answered on-set by cast or crew.

In 1994, the singer Anjan Dutt released his debut album Shunte Ki Chao? featuring a Bengali song named "2441139". In the song, Dutt calls his girlfriend Bela Bose at that number, repeating it multiple times in the song's chorus. Dutt says he picked the number because it rhymed well, not realizing that it was an actual residential number of the editor of a local newspaper, the Dainik Vishwamitra. The editor was inundated with calls, became a minor pop sensation himself, and sued Dutt but lost in court.

In 1997, Brazilian singer and rapper Gabriel o Pensador released the single "2345meia78" from his album Quebra-Cabeça. The song tells the story of a man who decides to call all the women in his phonebook from a payphone. The song was in 11th place among the best Brazilian songs of 1997. Since the release of the song, several owners of the number 234-5678, mentioned in the chorus of the song, have frequently received several prank calls. The label Sony Music has offered to buy the telephone lines for the number.

In the episode of Frasier titled "The Placeholder" which aired October 14, 2003, Roz left a voicemail that said "Frasier, this is Roz. Write down this number: 555-0179. Don't get mad, that's Ann's number. I talked to her, and she really thought you were cute and sweet and-"

In 2010, in the movie High School, Psycho Ed's card had the number (310) 874-9015 presented as a pager number, but the number is the contact telephone number of the director of that movie.

In 1998, Queens of the Stone Age released the song Regular John, which includes the number 86278-263789. In an interview with hiponline, frontman Josh Homme said: "It’s a number with one extra digit. It was just in there, but then I was thinking I can’t put a real number in the song. I don’t want someone calling it either, but I had to leave it. So it’s a whole phone number, with one extra digit stashed in there."

In 2022, in the "Fly Me to the Moon" episode of Star Trek: Picard, Q's calling card displayed "323-634-5667", a working telephone number that played a message recorded by actor John de Lancie.

== By country ==
=== Australia ===
Per the Australian Communications and Media Authority:

- Premium rate number
  - 1900 654 321
- Geographic numbers
  - Central East (covering NSW and ACT): (02) 5550 xxxx and (02) 7010 xxxx
  - South East (covering VIC and TAS): (03) 5550 xxxx and (03) 7010 xxxx
  - North East (covering QLD): (07) 5550 xxxx and (07) 7010 xxxx
  - Central West (covering SA, WA and NT): (08) 5550 xxxx and (08) 7010 xxxx
- Mobile numbers
  - 0491 570 006, 0491 570 156, 0491 570 157, 0491 570 158
  - 0491 570 159, 0491 570 110, 0491 570 313, 0491 570 737
  - 0491 571 266, 0491 571 491, 0491 571 804, 0491 572 549
  - 0491 572 665, 0491 572 983, 0491 573 770, 0491 573 087
  - 0491 574 118, 0491 574 632, 0491 575 254, 0491 575 789
  - 0491 576 398, 0491 576 801, 0491 577 426, 0491 577 644
  - 0491 578 957, 0491 578 148, 0491 578 888, 0491 579 212
  - 0491 579 760, 0491 579 455,
- Freephone and local rate numbers
  - 1800 160 401
  - 1800 975 707, 1800 975 708, 1800 975 709, 1800 975 710, 1800 975 711
  - 1300 975 707, 1300 975 708, 1300 975 709, 1300 975 710, 1300 975 711

=== France ===
The French telephone numbering plan is established by the Autorité de Régulation des Communications Électroniques, des Postes et de la Distribution de la Presse (ARCEP). It reserves six blocks of 10,000 telephone numbers for use in audiovisual productions.

- +33 1 99 00 xx xx (geographic, Île-de-France)
- +33 2 61 91 xx xx (geographic, North-west, Réunion, Mayotte)
- +33 3 53 01 xx xx (geographic, North-east)
- +33 4 65 71 xx xx (geographic, South-east)
- +33 5 36 49 xx xx (geographic, South-west, Overseas)
- +33 6 39 98 xx xx (mobile)

=== Germany ===
The Federal Network Agency, the primary authority of the telephone numbering plan in Germany, marked off a 1,000-number block of landline numbers in each of five major cities as so-called “Drama Numbers”, to be used in media productions. Additionally, certain mobile providers have also marked off a range of mobile numbers for that purpose.

Landline Area	First number	Last number
Berlin	(0)30-23125 000	(0)30-23125 999
Frankfurt am Main	(0)69-90009 000	(0)69-90009 999
Hamburg	(0)40-66969 000	(0)40-66969 999
Cologne	(0)221-4710 000	(0)221-4710 999
Munich	(0)89-99998 000	(0)89-99998 999

Mobile Provider	First number	Last number
Telekom	(0)171-39200 00	(0)171-39200 99
O2-Telefónica	(0)176-040690 00	(0)176-040690 99
Vodafone	(0)152-28817386 (0)152 28895456 (0)152-54599371 (0)172-9925904 (0)172-9968532 (0)172-9973185 (0)172-9973186 (0)172-9980752 (0)174-9091317 (0)174-9464308	

Sometimes, movie makers use undefined number blocks such as the +49 14x area.

=== Hungary ===
In Hungary, telephone numbers are in the format 06 + area code + subscriber number, where the area code is a single digit 1 for Budapest, the capital, followed by a seven digit subscriber number, and two digits followed by either seven (for cell phone numbers) or six digits (others). for other areas, cell phone numbers or non-geographic numbers like toll-free or premium-rate numbers. Two digit area codes which consist of digits between 2 and 9 are geographic areas, while area codes ending with a 0 or a 1 denote other services. The area code 55, which, according to its first digit, would be normally assigned to a geographic area in Eastern Hungary, is reserved as a test code with no subscriber numbers assigned. There are certain closed networks redefining area code 55 and assigning such numbers for subscribers or machines inside the network, but these are non-standard and non-dialable from outside the network.

Telephone numbers starting with the digits 555 are assigned to subscribers as ordinary numbers. Hungarian taxi company Tele5 Taxi uses 555-5555 as a vanity number, while at least one company specializing in vanity numbers sells cell phone numbers starting with the digits 555 for a premium rate, capitalizing on their fame in American movies.

=== Republic of Ireland ===
The following ranges are reserved by the Commission for Communications Regulation (ComReg) for filming and drama use.

- Geographic – 020 91x xxxx
- Mobile – 089 011 0xxx

=== North American Numbering Plan ===
The exchange prefix 555 in the North American Numbering Plan (NANP) is reserved for Directory Assistance and information numbers. As these are not issued as standard business or residence lines, the use of a 555 number in fiction is almost universal. Only the 555-01xx range is officially reserved, though numbers outside this range are commonly used. Nevada uses the prefix 555 for telephone numbers for TTY (teletypewriter) or TDD (telecommunication device for the deaf) only lines. The state's Public Utilities Commission also uses the prefix for one of its customer service lines.

The reservation applies to all geographic North American Numbering Plan area codes. 555 or a variant remains potentially valid outside North America; New Zealand uses mobile *555 to report traffic collisions.

In North America, exchanges 958 and 959 are normally reserved for local and long-distance test numbers (such as automatic number announcement circuits). A rare few areas (such as area code 204 in Manitoba) reserve 959 only. 950-xxxx are reserved as local access numbers for feature group "B" alternate long-distance carriers.

Early Bell System publications that illustrated a telephone commonly featured the number (311) 555-2368, and for multi-button telephone set, the station numbers 2369, 2370, 2371, etc. This appeared in Bell advertisements as recently as 1978. These numbers were also common in films and television; Jim Rockford's telephone number in the United States detective television series The Rockford Files was (311) 555-2368, as was one of Jaime Sommers' private numbers in The Bionic Woman; as a seven-digit call, 555-2368 reaches Ghostbusters. The number (if dialed as a ten-digit local call in large cities) now reaches 3-1-1 (city hall), but it occasionally continues to appear in documentation as a fictional number.

In the North American Numbering Plan, an area code had a 0 or 1 in the second position until 1995; these numbers could not be issued as individual local exchanges without breaking seven-digit (1+7D) long-distance calls within a numbering plan area. The B-52's (album) used the non-working number 6060-842 as the title of a 45 rpm "B"-side track on the 1979 version of hit single "Rock Lobster"; the song's main character dials "(the) stupid number all day long" only to find it disconnected. This reservation no longer exists.

Universal Pictures acquired the telephone number (212) 664-7665 for use in films to avoid the 555 prefix. It has been used in the films Munich, Scott Pilgrim vs. the World, The Adjustment Bureau, and Definitely, Maybe. Fictional Telecom has reserved voice over IP numbers in the 206 (Seattle), 323 (Los Angeles), 415 (San Francisco), and 646 (New York) area codes for use in films, TV and radio dramas. Occasionally, a real number serves as an Easter egg, as the publisher directs a number they own to a promotional message, a contest line or other content which ties into the original programme.

Telephone numbers that use the digit 1 in the first position of the exchange code, an invalid number format in the NANP, are occasionally used as fictional numbers.

=== South Korea ===
Since 2011, the Korean Film Council has reserved six numbers for filmmakers. The last four digits are obscured; full numbers are released only after a written request has been approved.

Due to budget constraints of the Council, these numbers are available exclusively to theatrical releases; TV series and OTT productions are not allowed to utilise them. This has caused multiple controversies where real, private phone numbers were exposed on screen in non-theatrical media, most notably in the first season of the Squid Game by Netflix.

- 02-540-xxxx (Seoul)
- 02-2285-xxxx (Seoul)
- 031-521-xxxx (Gyeonggi-do)
- 051-741-xxxx (Busan)
- 010-3348-xxxx (mobile)
- 010-6687-xxxx (mobile)

=== Sweden ===
The Swedish Post and Telecom Authority (PTS) handles the Swedish telephone numbering plan. PTS has decided to reserve five number series (one for mobile numbers, the other four for landline numbers) for use in, for example, films, TV series or books:

Type	First number	Last number
Mobile	070-1740605	070-1740699
Landline	031-3900600	031-3900699
Landline	040-6280400	040-6280499
Landline	08-46500400	08-46500499
Landline	0980-319200	0980-319299

=== United Kingdom ===
In the United Kingdom, the Office of Communications (Ofcom) has reserved blocks of numbers in some major areas for use in TV and radio dramas. Fictitious numbers in 011x and 01x1 area codes mostly end with the digits 496 0xxx; however, Tyneside uses (0191) 498 0xxx. London uses 020 7946 0xxx; Cardiff uses 029 2018 0xxx; and Northern Ireland now uses 028 9649 6xxx after a previously reserved range was allocated for actual use. The generic (and currently unused) area code 01632 is intended for use for all other geographical areas. Ofcom also reserves blocks of mobile phone (07700 900xxx), freephone (0808 157 0xxx), and premium rate (0909 879 0xxx) numbers for drama use.

The full number ranges are as follows:

Number range type	Code area	Code	Number range
Geographic	Leeds	0113	496 0000 to 496 0999
Geographic	Sheffield	0114	496 0000 to 496 0999
Geographic	Nottingham	0115	496 0000 to 496 0999
Geographic	Leicester	0116	496 0000 to 496 0999
Geographic	Bristol	0117	496 0000 to 496 0999
Geographic	Reading	0118	496 0000 to 496 0999
Geographic	Birmingham	0121	496 0000 to 496 0999
Geographic	Edinburgh	0131	496 0000 to 496 0999
Geographic	Glasgow	0141	496 0000 to 496 0999
Geographic	Liverpool	0151	496 0000 to 496 0999
Geographic	Manchester	0161	496 0000 to 496 0999
Geographic	Tyneside/Durham/Wearside	0191	498 0000 to 498 0999
Geographic	London	020	7946 0000 to 7946 0999
Geographic	Northern Ireland	028	9018 0000 to 9018 0999
Geographic	Cardiff	029	2018 0000 to 2018 0999
Geographic	No area	01632	960000 to 960999
Mobile	n/a	07700	900000 to 900999
UK-wide	n/a	0306	999 0000 to 999 0999
Freephone	n/a	0808	157 0000 to 157 0999
Premium rate services	n/a	0909	879 0000 to 879 0999

== See also ==
- 555 (telephone number)
- "Beechwood 4-5789" – a song by the Marvelettes
- Caller ID spoofing
- Candy Matson – a radio program (1949–1950) that gave Matson's number as YUkon 2-8409
- example.com
- Fictitious domain name
- PEnnsylvania 6-5000 – the Hotel Pennsylvania's number, popularized in Glenn Miller song Pennsylvania 6-5000
