= 555 (North American Numbering Plan) =

Telephone number prefix

The telephone number prefix 555 is a central office code in the North American Numbering Plan, used as the leading part of a group of 10,000 telephone numbers, 555-...., in each numbering plan area (NPA) (area code). It has traditionally been used only for the provision of directory assistance, when dialing NPA-555-1212.

The central office code is also used for fictitious telephone numbers in North American television shows, films, video games, and other media in order to prevent practical jokers and curious callers from bothering telephone subscribers and organizations by calling telephone numbers they see in works of fiction.

== History ==
In 1994, the North American Numbering Plan Administration began accepting applications for nationwide 555-numbers (outside the fictitious 555-01XX range). A number could be reserved for a single area code, for a region, or for nationwide service. In theory, a consumer from any area code could be invited to dial a seven-digit number such as 555-TAXI and the owners of that number could connect the call to a local car service. According to a 2003 New York Times article, the desired functionality requires the cooperation of local phone authorities, and most phone companies have been reluctant to cooperate. In May 2016, the Industry Numbering Committee (INC) determined that the purpose for which this resource was intended had been accommodated by other information/communication technologies. As of September 2016, all 555 numbers have been returned to the NANPA inventory except 555-1212 (national use directory assistance), 555-4334 (national use assigned), and 555-0100 through 555-0199 (reserved for § Fictional usage).

In 1996, Canadian telephone companies began promoting 555-1313 as "name that number", a pay-per-use reverse lookup which would give a subscriber name if the user entered an area code and a listed telephone number. The fifty-cent information number was initially heavily advertised in area codes 604 (BCTel), 416 (Bell Canada), 506 (NBTel), 902 (Maritime T&T) and 709 (Newfoundland Tel), but was soon forgotten once Internet sites began providing free reverse lookup tools.

Use of 555 for anything other than 555-1212 style information numbers raises the problem that call cost is unclear to consumers; in theory, the numbers could be anything from toll-free to premium. This complicates the provision of toll restriction to local subscribers.

== Current fictional usage ==
Telephone companies began encouraging the producers of television shows and movies to use the 555 prefix for fictional telephone numbers by the 1960s. Two early examples include The Second Time Around (1961), which used 555-3485, and Panic in Year Zero! (1962), which used 555-2106. In television shows made or set in the mid-1970s or earlier, "KLondike 5" or "KLamath 5" reflects the old convention of using telephone exchange names.

Before "555" or "KLondike-5" gained broad usage, scriptwriters would sometimes invent fake exchanges starting with words like "QUincy" or "ZEbra", as the letters "Q" and "Z" were not used on the old dial phones. Numbers in the format "Zenith" X-...., while not directly dialable, were not fictional. These were an early form of regional tollfree number which required operator assistance.

Only 555-0100 through 555-0199 are now specifically reserved for fictional use; the other numbers can now be assigned by telephone companies, except for 555-1212 (national use directory assistance) and 555-4334 (national use assigned).

555 use is restricted only in North America. In 1994, cartoonist Gary Larson's The Far Side included a panel with graffiti of a 555 number by which prank calls could be made to Satan. In Australia, 555 was at the time a standard exchange, and the Australian owner of the number became the subject of harassment, launching an unsuccessful lawsuit against Larson and his syndicate for defamation.

The 555 exchange is not reserved in area codes used for toll-free phone numbers. This led to the video game The Last of Us accidentally including the number to a phone-sex operator.

The number "555-2368" (or 311-555-2368) is a carryover from the "EXchange 2368" ("Exchange CENTral") number common in telephone advertisements as early as the 1940s. "555-2368" is the phone number used by Jim Rockford in the TV series The Rockford Files (as seen during the opening credits), in the TV series The Mod Squad (episode: "And a Little Child Shall Bleed Them") and the film Ghostbusters (as seen during their TV commercial within the film). The number "1-800-555-2368" appears in a magazine Daniel Jackson is reading in Stargate SG-1 (S04E13: "The Curse").

555 numbers are mentioned directly in the 1993 action film Last Action Hero, starring Arnold Schwarzenegger. Danny Madigan (played by Austin O'Brien) tries to convince Schwarzenegger's character that he is inside a movie by pointing out the 555 exchange provides at most 9,999 available telephone numbers, insufficient for all the phone users in Los Angeles. Schwarzenegger's character replies, "That's why we have area codes", and O'Brien's character drops the subject.

The use of 555 numbers helps to avoid use of valid numbers in works of fiction or entertainment, which can lead people to call those numbers and bother their holders. Tommy Tutone's song "867-5309/Jenny" and the cinematic release of Bruce Almighty displaying 776-2323 as a number to call God both led to misdialed calls in multiple area codes. God's number was changed to 555-0123 in the video release of the movie. In cities where it became popular, the 1966 song "634-5789" by Wilson Pickett and others caused many unwanted calls to actual subscribers who knew nothing about the song; many had to change their numbers. "777-9311" by The Time used Dez Dickerson's actual telephone number at the time the song was written, causing his phone to ring incessantly until he had his number changed. The Alicia Keys song "Diary" contains a real number in New York's area code 347, an overlay, but does not indicate an area code; the same number in some other area code is a common misdial.

== See also ==
- 2GAT123 is a fictional license plate number that has appeared in a number of television shows and movies.
