= It's About Time (Morris Day album) =

Studio album by Morris Day
- Released: June 22, 2004
- Recorded: June 21, 1998, House of Blues, Los Angeles (Live tracks)
- Genre: R&B, hip hop, funk
- Length: 46:32
- Label: Hollywood
- Producer: Morris Day, The Whole 9

Morris Day chronology
| Guaranteed (1992) | It's About Time (2004) | Last Call (2022) |

Professional ratings
Review scores
| Source | Rating |
|---|---|
| AllMusic | 2.5/5 stars |

It's About Time is the fourth solo album by R&B singer Morris Day. Released 12 years after his previous album Guaranteed, It's About Time is somewhat a return to form for Day. With the exception of four new songs, the album consists of previous hits, recorded live with the modern line-up of The Time. The live material was poorly edited to remove curse words and to fade abruptly between songs, removing most of the audience reactions. The patchiness of the album was not received well.

== Track listing ==
1. "The Bird" – 4:13 composed by Jamie Starr/Morris Day/Jesse Johnson
2. "Jungle Love" – 2:57 composed by Jamie Starr/Morris Day/Jesse Johnson
3. "Gigolos Get Lonely Too" – 4:17 composed by Jamie Starr
4. "Cool" – 6:20 composed by Jamie Starr/Dez Dickerson
5. "Ice Cream Castles" – 4:59 composed by Jamie Starr/Morris Day
6. "Get It Up / 777" – 5:23 composed by Jamie Starr
7. "Girl" – 2:46 composed by Jamie Starr
8. "Fishnet" – 2:46 composed by Morris Day/Jimmy Jam and Terry Lewis
9. "Ain't a Damn Thing Changed" – 2:49 composed by Morris Day/The Whole 9
10. "In My Ride" – 4:16 composed by Morris Day/The Whole9
11. "Two Drink Minimum" – 3:49 composed by Morris Day/The Whole 9/Tonya White
12. "Last Night" – 3:57 composed by Morris Day/The Whole 9/Tonya White

== Personnel ==
- Mastering – Stephen Marcussen
- Mixing – Peter Mokran
- Producer – Morris Day, The Whole 9, Ontario Haynes, John Rhone, Brian Hood, Jesse Johnson, Jamie Starr
- Rap – E-40
- Management – Courtney Benson

=== The Time ===
- Bass – Ricky "Freeze" Smith
- Drums – Jellybean Johnson
- Guitar – Torrell "Tori" Ruffin
- Keyboards – Monte Moir, Stanley "Chance" Howard, Robert "Gi" Grisset
- Percussion and valet – Jerome Benton
- Vocals – Morris Day (lead), the band (backing)
