= Ice Cream Castles =

- 7-inch single cover

Single by the Time

from the album Ice Cream Castle
- B-side: "Tricky"; "Get It Up" (UK 12-inch)
- Released: 1984
- Recorded: January 13–14, 1984
- Studio: Sunset Sound
- Length: 7-inch edit: 3:37 album/12-inch: 7:33
- Label: Warner Bros.
- Songwriter(s): Prince (as Jamie Starr), Morris Day
- Producer(s): Prince

The Time singles chronology
"Gigolos Get Lonely Too" (1983)	"Ice Cream Castles" (1984)	"Jungle Love" (1984)

"Ice Cream Castles" is the opening track from the Time's third album, Ice Cream Castle. The song was composed by Prince and Morris Day, with Prince writing the lyrics after recording the instrumental tracks. Day provided drums and lead vocals, while Jesse Johnson played electric guitars on the recording. Prince played all the other instruments.

"Ice Cream Castles" is about an interracial relationship. The song's title is based on a lyric from Joni Mitchell.

The song reached number 11 on the R&B charts, but it did not enter the pop charts. A live recording from 1998 was included on Morris Day's 2004 release, It's About Time.

The single was backed with "Tricky", featuring Day on drums and Prince on the bass and keyboards. The UK 12-inch single also included the earlier hit "Get It Up", from the Time's debut album.

== Personnel ==
Credits sourced from Duane Tudahl and Benoît Clerc

- Morris Day – lead and backing vocals, drums
- Jesse Johnson – electric guitars, backing vocals
- Prince – Oberheim OB-8, bass guitar, Pearl SY-1 Syncussion, percussion, music box, backing vocals

== Charts ==
Chart performance for "Ice Cream Castles"
Chart (1984)	Peak position
US Hot Black Singles (Billboard)	11
