= The Walk (The Time song) =

- U.S. 12" single cover

Single by the Time

from the album What Time Is It?
- B-side: "OnedayI'mgonnabesomebody" (U.S. 7" single); "777-9311" (Japan 7" single); "I Don't Wanna Leave You" (12" single)
- Released: November 1982
- Recorded: Sunset Sound, January 14, 1982 (tracking and overdubs)
- Genre: Funk, rock
- Length: 7" edit: 3:24; Album/12": 9:30
- Label: Warner Bros.
- Songwriter: The Time (Prince)
- Producers: Morris Day, Prince (as The Starr Company)

The Time singles chronology
"777-9311" (1982)	"The Walk" (1982)	"Gigolos Get Lonely Too" (1983)

"The Walk" opens side two of the Time's second album, What Time Is It?. The song was produced, arranged, composed and performed by Prince with Morris Day later adding his lead vocals.

The funk song opens with a brief drum fill and has several throughout the song, along with handclaps from a Linn LM-1. The beat is somewhat of a march, which is emphasized by Day during the song's break by mimicking an army chant. The "walking" bass of the song is perhaps inspired by the song's title. The keyboards take an important role, as well as a rock guitar solo. Despite the song being performed nearly entirely by Prince, several band members are called out throughout the song (Jellybean Johnson and Terry Lewis) giving the song a live feel. The ending of the song is a humorous conversation between Morris Day and Denise Matthews, lead singer of Vanity 6. Prince himself also makes an appearance as an Italian club owner.

The U.S. 7" single was backed with the album's brief "OnedayI'mgonnabesomebody", while the Japanese 7" had "777-9311" as the B-side. The 12" single had "'I Don't Wanna Leave You" and an edit of "The Walk" as B-sides.

"The Walk" reached #24 on the R&B charts. In addition, along with the tracks, 777-9311, and "I Don't Want to Leave You", "The Walk" peaked at #42 on the US Disco Top 80 chart. The song became one of the Time's signature numbers. The song is played at nearly all of their concerts.

"The Walk" was mentioned on the Ice Cream Castle track, "Chili Sauce", and was sampled on the Corporate World track "Murph Drag" and the Pandemonium track "The Latest Fashion". Prince himself mentions “The Walk” in the song “Play In The Sunshine”, a track from his “Sign O’ The Times” album.

== Personnel ==
Credits sourced from Prince Vault

- Morris Day - lead and backing vocals, spoken word, drums
- Prince - backing vocals, spoken word, bass guitar, electric guitar, Linn LM-1, electronic drums, Oberheim OB-X, Yamaha CP-70
- Vanity - spoken word
