= Jerk Out =

- US CD maxi-single

Single by The Time

from the album Pandemonium
- B-side: "Mo' Jerk Out"
- Released: June 28, 1990
- Recorded: December 1981; reworked Spring, 1985; reworked Fall, 1989
- Genre: Pop, funk, hip hop
- Length: 7" edit: 3:54; Album: 6:49
- Label: Paisley Park
- Songwriters: Prince, Jimmy Jam and Terry Lewis, Morris Day
- Producer: Prince

The Time singles chronology
"The Bird" (1984)	"Jerk Out" (1990)	"Chocolate" (1990)

"Jerk Out" is a song by the American funk band The Time and was the lead single for their 1990 studio album Pandemonium. The single became the group's highest-charting single, reaching number one on the U.S. R&B chart and number nine on the U.S. pop chart. "Jerk Out" also peaked at number six on the dance chart.

== Background ==
Prince began tracking the song in late 1981 at his Kiowa Trail Home Studio with lyrics inspired by an incident on the Controversy Tour, when members of The Time were removed from a flight ("jerked out") for causing a disturbance. The song had lead vocals recorded by Morris Day in early 1982 as it was intended for The Time's second album What Time Is It? although it didn't make the final track listing.

In 1985, Prince gave the song to Mazarati along with "100 MPH", both intended for their 1986 self-titled debut album. Lead and backing vocal overdubs were recorded by Sir Casey Terry at around April 1985, but Mazarati ultimately ended up only taking "100 MPH" and rejected "Jerk Out" due to some offensive lyrics.

In 1989, The Time's upcoming album Corporate World was "put on hold" as the original members of the band were brought in by Prince to work on the album which later developed into their 1990 release Pandemonium. Members of the band chose "Jerk Out" from Prince's vault of unreleased songs, and re-worked most aspects of the song at Paisley Park Studios in Chanhassen, Minnesota. They altered the lyrics by omitting the controversial verses and replacing them with catchy hooks and confident lyricism to align with The Time's party-like persona. The basic tracks such as the drum beat, synthesizers and guitars were kept along with Sir Casey Terry's backing vocals, although Jesse Johnson overdubbed electric guitar solos to replace the synth-organ solo initially heard on the Mazarati demo.

The track was also remixed by various outside remixers for the 1990 maxi-single.

== Track listing ==
=== 7" single ===
1. "Jerk Out" (Edit) – 3:54
2. "Jerk Out" – (Mo' Jerk Out) – 4:30

=== Maxi-single ===
1. "Jerk Out" (Sexy Mix) – 8:55
2. "Jerk Out" (Sexy Edit) – 4:36
3. "Jerk Out" (A Capella) – 2:28
4. "Jerk Out" (Sexy Dub) – 7:14
5. "Jerk Out" (Sexy Instrumental) – 7:02

== Personnel ==
Credits sourced from Prince Vault

- Morris Day – lead vocals
- Jerome Benton – percussion and "mirror and holler"
- Jesse Johnson – electric guitar, backing vocals
- Prince – backing vocals, Linn LM-1, Oberheim OB-X, Oberheim OB-SX, bass guitar, electric guitar, cymbals
- Jimmy Jam – backing vocals
- Terry Lewis – backing vocals
- Jellybean Johnson – backing vocals
- Monte Moir – backing vocals
- Jill Jones – backing vocals
- Sir Casey Terry – backing vocals

== Charts ==
=== Weekly charts ===
Chart (1990)	Peak position
US Billboard Hot 100	9
US Dance Club Songs (Billboard)	6
US Hot R&B/Hip-Hop Songs (Billboard)	1

=== Year-end charts ===
Chart (1990)	Position
US Billboard Hot 100	93
US Hot R&B/Hip-Hop Songs (Billboard)	31

== See also ==
- R&B number-one hits of 1990 (USA)
