= Jungle Love (The Time song) =

- German 12-inch single

Single by the Time

from the album Ice Cream Castle
- B-side: "Tricky" (Europe 12-inch); "Oh, Baby" (7-inch)
- Released: 1984
- Recorded: March 26, 1983 (basic tracking); January 15, 1984 (overdubs)
- Studio: Sunset Sound
- Length: 7-inch edit: 3:24 album/12-inch: 5:29
- Label: Warner Bros.
- Songwriters: Prince (as Jamie Starr), Morris Day, Jesse Johnson
- Producer: Prince

The Time singles chronology
"Ice Cream Castles" (1984)	"Jungle Love" (1984)	"The Bird" (1985)

Purple Rain singles chronology
Purple Rain (1984)	Jungle Love (1984)	I Would Die 4 U (1984)

"Jungle Love" is a song from the Time's third album, Ice Cream Castle.

== Background ==
"Jungle Love" was recorded in late March 1983 during Prince's 1999 tour.

The track was also one of the first Time tracks to involve other members of the band in the creation of the song. Morris Day and Jesse Johnson both contributed to writing the song. Day provided lead vocals and programmed the Linn LM-1 drum machine, and Johnson played guitar, while Prince played all the other instruments.

== Impact ==
The song's elements, combined with the Purple Rain momentum, propelled the song to the Time's second-highest position thus far on the pop charts peaking at number 20 on the Billboard Hot 100. Their highest-charting song was "Jerk Out", which peaked at number 9.

Live versions of the song have been released on two DVDs, including one of the band performing the song on Jay and Silent Bob Strike Back. A live recording from 1998 was also included on the Morris Day release It's About Time (released in 2004).

== Personnel ==
Information sourced from Duane Tudahl and Benoît Clerc

- Morris Day – lead and backing vocals, Linn LM-1
- Jesse Johnson – electric guitars, backing vocals
- Prince – Oberheim OB-8, percussion, backing vocals
- Jill Jones – backing vocals

== Charts ==
=== Weekly charts ===
Weekly chart performance for "Jungle Love"
Chart (1984–1985)	Peak position
US Billboard Hot 100	20
US Billboard Dance/Disco	9
US Hot Black Singles (Billboard)	6

=== Year-end charts ===
Year-end chart performance for "Jungle Love"
Chart (1985)	Rank
US Top Pop Singles (Billboard)	91

== Legacy ==
Prince's original version was released on his posthumous album Originals in 2019.
