= The Time (The Time album) =

Studio album by the Time
- Released: July 29, 1981
- Recorded: April 1981
- Studio: Kiowa Trail Home Studio
- Genre: Funk
- Length: 42:34
- Label: Warner Bros.
- Producer: Jamie Starr, Morris Day

The Time chronology
The Time (1981)	What Time Is It? (1982)

Singles from The Time
- 1. "Get It Up" Released: June 26, 1981; 2. "Cool" Released: November 1981; 3. "Girl" Released: April 1982

Professional ratings
Review scores
Source	Rating
AllMusic	link

The Time is the 1981 debut album by the Time. The album was largely produced and arranged by Prince, credited as Jamie Starr. Three singles came from the album: "Get It Up", "Cool" and "Girl", with the first two charting within the top ten on the R&B charts.

== Recording ==
Although the individual members of the Time are credited with playing their instruments, the music was almost entirely performed by Prince. The only instrumental performances not by Prince were by Dr. Fink, who played synthesizer solos on "Get It Up" and "The Stick", and Morris Day, who played drums for the majority of the album. Day also sang lead vocals, replacing Prince's guide vocals.

The credits list the recording studio as the fictional "Time Studio", but recording took place in Prince's Kiowa Trail Home Studio, Chanhassen, Minnesota, during April 1981. "Oh, Baby" had originally been recorded during the Prince album sessions from late April to 13 June 1979, at Alpha Studios, Burbank, California, but the version on the album is from the April 1981, sessions.

== Commercial performance ==
The album peaked at number 50 on the Billboard 200 and number seven on the Top Soul LPs charts. The album spent a total of 32 weeks on the Billboard 200 and 45 weeks on the R&B Albums chart. The album was eventually certified gold by the Recording Industry Association of America (RIAA) for sales of over 500,000 copies in the United States.

== Track listing ==
The original LP and singles gave no writer credits, only stating that "All Jams Published by Tionna Music". However, all compositions were registered with ASCAP, and the writer credits are derived from that source. All tracks written by Prince unless where noted.

Side one
No.	Title	Writer(s)	Length
1.	"Get It Up"		9:05
2.	"Girl"		5:34
3.	"After Hi School"	Dez Dickerson	4:20

Side two
No.	Title	Writer(s)	Length
4.	"Cool"	Prince, Dickerson	10:06
5.	"Oh, Baby"		4:57
6.	"The Stick"	Prince, Lisa Coleman (Note: Prince is registered as the songwriter, but it is generally acknowledged to having been written or co-written by Lisa Coleman.)	8:23

== Personnel ==
Credits sourced from Prince Vault and Guitarcloud (Note: Due to the similar recording times, most of the equipment can be identified by looking at the most recent album Prince made, which in this case is Dirty Mind.)

- Morris Day – lead and backing vocals, drums (2, 4–6)
- Prince – backing vocals (all but 2), electric guitars (all tracks), Oberheim OB-X (1, 3, 4, 6), ARP Omni (all but 5), Yamaha CP-70 electric grand piano (2, 5, 6), bass guitar (all tracks), drums (1, 3), percussion (1, 3, 4, 6), engineer, mixing (uncredited)
- Dr. Fink – Oberheim OB-X (1, 6)
- Lisa Coleman – backing vocals (4, 6) (listed as "various girlfriends")
- Sue Ann Carwell – backing vocals (1, 4) (listed as "various girlfriends")
- Bernie Grundman – mastering
- Al Beaulieu – photography

The album was mixed at Hollywood Sound Recorders, Los Angeles, California, April 1981

== Singles and chart placings ==
- "Get It Up" (No. 6 R&B)
1. "Get It Up" (edit)
2. "After Hi School"
- "Cool" (No. 90 US Hot 100, No. 7 US R&B)
1. "Cool" (edit)
2. "Cool" (Part 2)
- "Girl" (No. 49 R&B)
1. "Girl" (edit)
2. "The Stick" (edit)

== Charts ==
Chart performance for The Time
Chart (1981)	Peak position
US Billboard Top LPs & Tape	50
US Billboard Top Soul LPs	7

== Certifications ==
Certifications for The Time
Region	Certification	Certified units/sales
United States (RIAA)	Gold	500,000^{^}
^{^} Shipments figures based on certification alone.
