= Misdialed call =

Telephone number input error

A misdialed call or wrong number is a telephone call or text message to an incorrect telephone number. This may occur because the number has been physically misdialed, the number is simply incorrect, or because the area code or ownership of the number has changed. In North America, toll-free numbers are a frequent source of wrong numbers because they often have a history of prior ownership. In the United Kingdom, many misdialed calls have been due to public confusion over the dialing codes for some areas.

== Etiquette ==
The recipient of a wrong number is usually unknown to the caller. This aspect has been used in social science experiments designed to study the willingness of people to help strangers, and the extent to which this is affected by characteristics such as race. This experimental method is known as the "wrong-number technique".

The Emily Post Institute recommends that the recipient of a text message to a misdialed number respond with, "Sorry, wrong number." A fraud expert recommends not responding or engaging at all with messages from unknown numbers, to avoid text message scams that start with an innocent-looking message from a stranger.

== Technical considerations ==
On a landline, wrong numbers incur no toll for the recipient but do represent the annoyance of answering an unwanted call. This may be problematic for shift workers who are asleep during the day. On cellphones in countries where mobile plans charge for incoming calls, a wrong number may cost the subscriber one or more minutes.

Sources of misdialled calls are similar to sources of typographical error:

- Pressing one or more wrong keys on the keypad of the phone (example 2379 rather than 2349)
- Pressing a key on the dialpad more times than appears in succession in the phone number, thereby completing the length of the number prior to completing the intended number (example 7522–7 with the final 7 being ignored rather than 7527)
- Transposing digits in the phone number (example 3416 rather than 3146)

=== Fictional numbers ===
The use of local telephone numbers in mainstream fictional works is problematic as the number will often belong to one or more real subscribers in various other area codes. Well-known fictional numbers like 867-5309 (Jenny's number, from a popular 1982 song) and 776-2323 (God's number in the 2003 cinema release of Bruce Almighty) continue to receive misdialled calls years later.

This is often avoided by using reserved or invalid numbers (such as 555 (telephone number)), or by displaying a real area code and number which belongs to the publisher of the fictional work.

=== Emergency numbers ===
Inadvertent calls to emergency telephone numbers are problematic as, if the dispatcher is uncertain of the nature of a presumed emergency, police are rapidly dispatched to the address on an enhanced 9-1-1 or 1-1-2 call. Most often, these calls tie up resources which need to be available for emergency response - especially if the caller is silent or disconnects the call without acknowledging the error. In Raleigh, North Carolina, a 2012 change which forced subscribers to dial the 919 area code on local calls caused a 20% increase in total calls to 9-1-1, a result of frequent misdials.

=== Toll-free numbers ===
Misdialled calls are problematic for toll-free telephone number subscribers, who must pay long-distance tolls to receive the calls and pay staff to answer misdirected enquiries. A small, local business whose toll-free number differs in one digit from a large national franchise will typically receive multiple misdialled calls daily.

In some cases, commercial rivals have engaged in wilful typosquatting to profit from misdial traffic. If 1-800-HOLIDAY (+1-800-465-4329) is Holiday Inn, an unscrupulous vendor could register 1-800-H0LIDAY (+1-800-405-4329, the same number with 'o' replaced by 'zero'), resell bookings for rooms in the same or a rival hotel and collect a profitable travel agent's commission.

Some franchise chains have resorted to the defensive registration of complementary numbers, the commonly misdialled variants of their main number, as a defense against the typosquatters.

A similar issue exists with toll-free number hoarding. One marketer can create multiple shell companies to operate as RespOrgs and register toll-free numbers as soon as their previous users disconnect service. Callers to millions of these numbers are connected not to the desired party but to an advertisement, such as the PrimeTel Communications promotions for costly phone sex numbers. By tying up millions of easily remembered numbers, these schemes force businesses to use overlay plan area codes or numbers without mnemonic phonewords.

Deployment of multiple toll-free area codes further increases the probability of misdial calls as a common wrong number pattern is to call the +1-800- version of a number which is actually in another area code. In 2009, General Motors advertised +1-877-CLUNKER (1-877-258-6537) to promote a $3 billion U.S. federal "cash for clunkers" program. Judy Van Fossan of The Flower Corner in Clinton, Illinois, a tiny local shop which owned 1-800-CLUNKER (+1-800-258-6537), was inundated with more than 150 wrong numbers daily. As of 2013, this florist is advertising a local number only; as the vehicle scrappage program ended in 2009, the abandoned +1-800/888/877 CLUNKER phonewords are now typosquatted as Primetel numbers.

While prohibitions on hoarding, brokering and warehousing numbers exist both in the US (under FCC regulations) and Australia (under ACMA) enforcement has been non-existent except in the most egregious cases, such as registering distinctive phone-words (like +1-800-RED-CROSS) in order to attempt to sell or lease the numbers to the named organization or its local chapters.

== Text message scams ==
In the 2020s, mobile phone spammers have used ostensibly misdirected text messages to attract pig butchering scam victims. A con artist sends out a large number of apparently innocent messages to a large number of people. When a person responds saying that the message was sent in error, the con artist apologizes, then introduces themselves, and begins a long con to gain the text recipient's confidence. Between late 2021 and mid-2022, the FBI estimates that text message scams had cost 244 victims a total of US$42.7 million to cryptocurrency fraud. Some wrong-number text message scammers are forced laborers in Southeast Asia.

== In popular culture ==
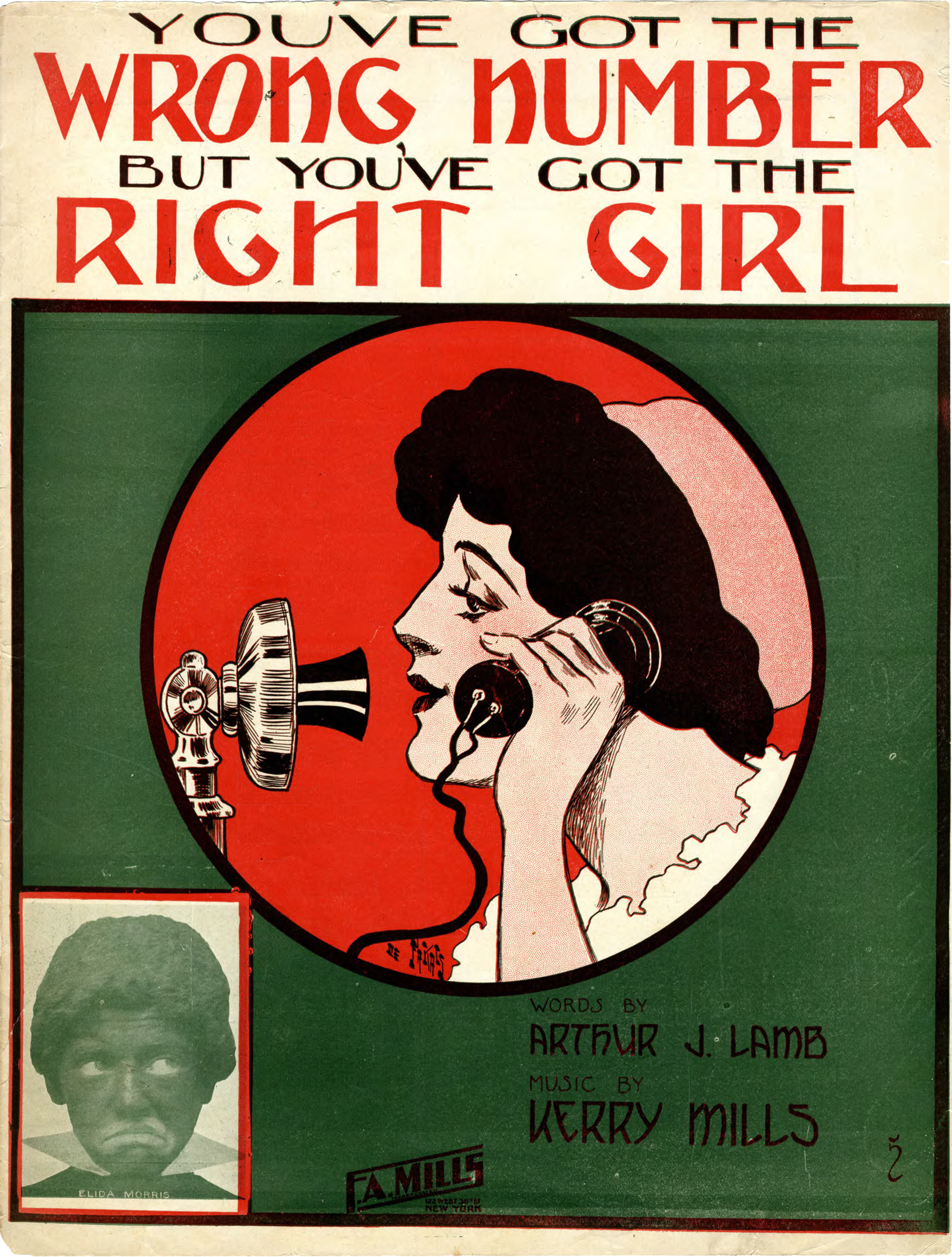
A 1911 sheet music collection, You've Got The Wrong Number, But You've Got The Right Girl

Misdialled calls serve as a plot device in 1948 film Sorry, Wrong Number, in television such as in the Dad's Army episode "Sorry, Wrong Number" and in the Seinfeld episode "The Pool Guy". They are also used on the Touch-Tone Terrorists prank call CD series. They also figure in the name of Hotline Miami 2: Wrong Number top-down action game by Dennaton Games.

== See also ==
- Phone calls from the dead
- Pocket dialing
