= Chocolate (The Time song) =

- Promo 12" single

Single by The Time

from the album Pandemonium
- B-side: "My Drawers"
- Released: October 1, 1990
- Recorded: April 17, 1983 (basic tracking and overdubs); April 21, 1983 (vocal overdubs by Prince, Jill Jones, Wendy Melvoin, and Lisa Coleman); April 22, 1983 (vocal overdubs by Morris Day); Late 1989 (additional recording by The Time)
- Studio: Sunset Sound, Hollywood, California; Paisley Park, Chanhassen, Minnesota, US
- Genre: Pop, funk
- Length: 7" edit: 4:35; Album/12": 7:30; 12" Remix: 7:59
- Label: Paisley Park
- Songwriter: Prince
- Producer: Prince

The Time singles chronology
"Jerk Out" (1990)	"Chocolate" (1990)	"Shake!" (1990)

"Chocolate" is a song from The Time's 1990 album Pandemonium. The song was released as the second single from Pandemonium, and was written by usual band collaborator Prince. The song had been primarily recorded in April 1983 during the early sessions for the group's third album, Ice Cream Castle. The group's drummer, Jellybean Johnson, remarked on the notable James Brown influence that the track was channeling: "That's some great shit, that's just hard-core James sound. I loved it."

== Track listing ==
=== 7" single ===
1. "Chocolate" #2 (7" Remix / Edit) – 4:35
2. "My Drawers" – 3:57

=== Maxi single ===
1. "Chocolate" (7" Remix / Edit) – 4:35
2. "Chocolate" (12inch Remix) – 7:59
3. "Chocolate" (Tootsie Roll Club Mix) – 6:11
4. "Chocolate" (Instrumental) – 7:29
5. "Chocolate" (Percapella) – 7:23
6. "My Drawers" – 3:57

== Personnel ==
Credits sourced from Duane Tudahl and Prince Vault.

- Morris Day – lead vocals
- Prince – backing vocals, waiter vocal, synthesizers, Oberheim OB-8, electric guitars, bass guitar, Linn LM-1, cymbal, handclaps
- Wendy Melvoin – electric guitar solo, backing vocals
- Lisa Coleman – backing vocals
- Jill Jones – backing vocals

== Charts ==
Chart performance for "Chocolate"
Chart (1990)	Peak position
US Hot R&B/Hip-Hop Singles & Tracks (Billboard)	44
