= Shockadelica =

Shockadelica may refer to:

- Shockadelica (album), 1986 album by Jesse Johnson
- "Shockadelica" (song), 1987 song by Prince
