= Cool (The Time song) =

- U.S. 7" single cover

Single by The Time

from the album The Time
- B-side: "Cool (Part 2)"
- Released: November 1981
- Recorded: Minneapolis, Minnesota, April 1981
- Genre: Funk, pop
- Length: 7" edit: 3:12; Album: 10:06
- Label: Warner Bros.
- Composer(s): Prince
- Lyricist(s): Dez Dickerson
- Producer(s): Morris Day, Prince (as "Jamie Starr")

The Time singles chronology
"Get It Up" (1981)	"Cool" (1981)	"Girl" (1982)

Alternative cover
- Promo 12" single

"Cool" is a song by The Time, released as the second single from their eponymous debut album. Like most of the album, the song was recorded in Prince's home studio in April 1981, and was produced, arranged, and performed by Prince with Morris Day later adding his lead vocals. The song was co-written with Revolution guitarist Dez Dickerson and contains background vocals by keyboardist Lisa Coleman, however both were uncredited.

The funk-pop relies heavily on synthesizers to provide both the bass and melody for the upbeat song. A guitar solo is present and a relatively simple drumbeat drives the song along. "Cool" sets up the persona created for Day as a wealthy playboy, one who is also popular, and of course, "cool". Day built a career around the persona. Prince's backing vocals are very apparent in the song, especially in the chorus.

The classic video for the song is directed by Chuck Statler, who is best known for directing the early Devo videos.

"Cool" was only issued as a 7" single with an edit of the song and a continuation as the B-side. The full version was only released on the album and on a promo release. One of The Time's more popular numbers, "Cool" is a staple in concert and a live version of the song recorded at the House of Blues in 1998 was included on Morris Day's 2004 album, It's About Time.

== Personnel ==
Credits sourced from Prince Vault and Guitarcloud (Note: Due to the similar recording times, most of the equipment can be identified by looking at the most recent album Prince made, which in this case is Dirty Mind.)

- Morris Day – lead and backing vocals, drums
- Prince – backing vocals, Oberheim OB-X, ARP Omni, electric guitars, bass guitar, percussion
- Lisa Coleman – backing vocals
- Sue Ann Carwell – backing vocals

== Charts ==
Chart (1982)	Peak position
US Billboard Hot 100	90
U.S. Billboard Hot Soul Singles	7
U.S. Billboard Disco Top 80	3

== Cover versions ==
Snoop Dogg covered "Cool" for his ninth studio album, Ego Trippin'. The song samples the original instrumental track while newly recorded background vocals (along with Snoop's lead vocals) and sound effects were added. This version of the song is produced by Teddy Riley. Prince also performed this song in concerts from 2002 to 2015.
