= What Time Is It? (album) =

Studio album by the Time
- Released: August 25, 1982
- Recorded: January – May/June 1982 (except for "Wild and Loose" in July 1981)
- Genre: Synth-funk, Minneapolis sound
- Length: 38:46
- Label: Warner Bros.
- Producer: Morris Day, The Starr ★ Company

The Time chronology
The Time (1981)	What Time Is It? (1982)	Ice Cream Castle (1984)

Singles from What Time Is It?
- 1. "777-9311" Released: July 30, 1982; 2. "The Walk" Released: November 1982; 3. "Gigolos Get Lonely Too" Released: March 1983

What Time Is It? is a 1982 album by the Time. Their second album, it was recorded at Sunset Sound and Prince's home studio in the Minneapolis suburbs. The title of the album comes from an exclamation by Morris Day that became associated with the band's on-stage theatrics, appearing frequently on the band's debut album as well.

Showcasing the synth-funk of Prince's Minneapolis sound, What Time Is It? produced three singles: "777-9311", "The Walk" and "Gigolos Get Lonely Too".

== Recording ==
Although the individual members of the Time are credited with instrumentation, most of the instruments on the album were played by Prince, with Morris Day playing drums on half of the album. Morris Day sang lead vocals, and Vanity performed spoken vocals on "The Walk". Additionally, the Time guitarist Jesse Johnson appears on "Gigolos Get Lonely Too".

== Commercial performance ==
Professional ratings
Review scores
Source	Rating
AllMusic	4.5/5 stars

The album peaked at number 26 on the Billboard 200 and number two on the Top Soul LPs. It spent a total of 33 weeks on the Billboard 200 and 38 weeks on the R&B Albums chart. The album's peaking was more successful than the group's previous release. The album was eventually certified gold by the Recording Industry Association of America (RIAA) for sales over 500,000 copies in the United States. The Time supported the album by touring as one of Prince's opening acts on the 1999 Tour.

== Track listing ==
All tracks are written by Prince, except where noted (Note: The original label gave writing credits to Morris Day or The Time for all six songs. However, the songs were officially registered with ASCAP, which is from where the official writing credits have been sourced, as being written by Prince, or by Prince and Dez Dickerson.)

Side one
No.	Title	Writer(s)	Length
1.	"Wild and Loose" (composition credited on label to the Time)	Prince, Dez Dickerson	7:32
2.	"777-9311" (composition credited on label to Morris Day)		7:57
3.	"Onedayi'mgonnabesomebody" (composition credited on label to the Time)		2:27

Side two
No.	Title	Length
4.	"The Walk" (composition credited on label to the Time)	9:30
5.	"Gigolos Get Lonely Too" (composition credited on label to Morris Day)	4:40
6.	"I Don't Wanna Leave You" (composition credited on label to the Time)	6:30

== Personnel ==
Adapted from liner notes and Benôit Clerc

=== Musicians ===
- Morris Day – lead and backing vocals, drums (tracks 1, 4, 5)
- Prince – backing vocals (all tracks except 6), electric guitars (all tracks except 5), synthesizers (all tracks), Yamaha CP-70 electric grand piano (tracks 4–6), bass guitar (all tracks), drums (track 3), Linn LM-1 (tracks 2, 6), percussion (all tracks)
- Vanity (Note: Credited as Vanity 6) – spoken vocals (track 4)
- Jesse Johnson – electric guitar and backing vocals (track 5) (Note: Credited for guitar and vocals on the whole album.)
- Susan Moonsie, Kim Upsher – backing vocals (track 1) (Note: Their contribution is uncredited and assumed.)

=== Production ===
- Prince – engineer
- Don Batts – recording and mixing engineer
- Peggy McCreary – recording and mixing engineer
- Bernie Grundman – mastering

=== Technical ===
- Al Beaulieu – photography

== Singles and chart placings ==
- "777-9311" (#2 R&B, #88 Pop)
1. "777-9311"
2. "Grace" (non-album track) – 7" single
3. "The Walk" – 12" single
- "The Walk" (#24 R&B, #104 Pop)
1. "The Walk"
2. "OnedayI'mgonnabesomebody" – 7" single
3. "777-9311" – Japan 7" single
4. "I Don't Wanna Leave You" – 12" single
- "Gigolos Get Lonely Too" (#77 R&B)
1. "Gigolos Get Lonely Too"
2. "I Don't Wanna Leave You"

== Charts ==
=== Weekly charts ===
Weekly chart performance for What Time Is It?
Chart (1982)	Peak position
US Billboard 200	26
US Top R&B/Hip-Hop Albums (Billboard)	2

=== Year-end charts ===
Year-end chart performance for What Time Is It?
Chart (1983)	Position
US Top R&B/Hip-Hop Albums (Billboard)	24

== Certifications ==
Certifications for What Time Is It?
Region	Certification	Certified units/sales
United States (RIAA)	Gold	500,000^{^}
^{^} Shipments figures based on certification alone.
