= Gigolos Get Lonely Too =

Single by the Time

from the album What Time Is It?
- B-side: "I Don't Wanna Leave You"
- Released: March 1983
- Recorded: January 11, 1982
- Studio: Sunset Sound, Los Angeles
- Length: 4:40 (album version); 3:45 (single version)
- Label: Warner Bros.
- Songwriter(s): Morris Day (Prince)
- Producer(s): Morris Day, Prince (as The Starr ★ Company)

The Time singles chronology
"The Walk" (1982)	"Gigolos Get Lonely Too" (1983)	"Ice Cream Castles" (1984)

"Gigolos Get Lonely Too" is the fifth track from the Time's six-song album, What Time Is It?. One of the first songs recorded for the album, it was produced, arranged, composed and performed by Prince with Morris Day later adding his lead vocals.

The song is the album's only ballad, featuring treated electronic drums, as well as live drums. Keyboards and bass make up the remaining instrumentation with an understated guitar. Day sang and played drums, Jesse Johnson played guitar, and Prince played everything else. The single was backed with the album's closing track "I Don't Wanna Leave You".

The single reached number 77 on the R&B charts. A live recording of the song from 1998 was included on Morris Day's 2004 release, It's About Time.

A different mix of the song is heard on the posthumous Prince album Originals, released in 2019. This version has Prince on lead vocals and most instruments, Johnson on guitar and backing vocals, and Day on drums and backing vocals.

== Personnel ==
Credits sourced from Benoît Clerc and Duane Tudahl

- Morris Day – lead and backing vocals, drums
- Prince – Oberheim OB-Xa, ARP Omni-2, Yamaha CP-70 electric grand piano, bass guitar, Pearl SY-1 Syncussion, finger snaps, backing vocals
- Jesse Johnson – electric guitar, backing vocals
