= 2GAT123 =

Fictional license plate number

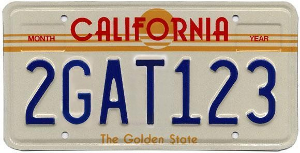
An illustration of a 2GAT123 license plate on a period-appropriate "Golden State" base

2GAT123 is a fictional license plate number that has appeared in a number of television shows and movies. It is used to prevent difficulties for a real person who might coincidentally have the same license plate number as one appearing in a movie.

Many states have reserved the number "123 SAM", "SAM 123", and in some cases the vanity license plate "SAMPLE" for use as sample and fictitious license plates.

The number almost always appears on a California license plate and is characteristic of the numbering scheme used by the California Department of Motor Vehicles, which began using the "1ABC123" numbering format for automobiles in 1980, replacing the exhausted "123 ABC" series. Plates in the 2GAT series would have been issued in mid-1987. At that time, California was issuing license plates on the "Golden State" base rather than the current "Script" base. "Golden State" California license plates were available as an alternate option to the previous yellow-on-blue since 1982. They were issued with plate numbers from 2AAA000 to 2GPZ999. Another commonly used fictional California license plate, 2FAN321, also would have been issued on a "Golden State" base in 1987.

GAT, like SAM and FAN, is a three-letter combination not used by the California Department of Motor Vehicles. In addition, the California Department of Motor Vehicles does not use the letter "I", "O", or "Q" in the first or third position of the three-letter combination. However, prop California license plates seen in television shows and movies frequently do.

Prop California license plates are frequently reused on vehicles in different television shows and movies. They are sometimes reused on different vehicles in different episodes of the same television series. Most prop license plates are in the 2, 3, and 4-series, but they are often used on new vehicles that would be issued a 5 or 6 series license number.

== See also ==
- Vehicle registration plates of California
- 555 (North American Numbering Plan)
