= Can You Help Me =

1985 single by Jesse Johnson

Single by Jesse Johnson

from the album Jesse Johnson's Revue
- B-side: "Free World"
- Released: 1985
- Genre: Funk; R&B
- Length: 5:22
- Label: A&M
- Songwriter(s): Jesse Johnson

Jesse Johnson singles chronology
"Be Your Man" (1985)	"Can You Help Me" (1985)	"I Want My Girl" (1985)

"Can You Help Me" is a song written and performed by American contemporary R&B musician Jesse Johnson, issued as the second single from his debut studio album Jesse Johnson's Revue. The song peaked at #3 on the Billboard R&B chart in 1985.

== Chart positions ==
Chart (1985)	Peak position
Dance Music/Club Play Singles (Billboard)	12
Hot Dance Music/Maxi-Singles Sales (Billboard)	18
Hot R&B/Hip-Hop Singles & Tracks (Billboard)	3
