= 777-9311 =

Single by The Time

from the album What Time Is It?
- B-side: "Grace" (7" single); "The Walk" (12" single)
- Released: July 30, 1982
- Recorded: Minneapolis, Minnesota
- Studio: May/June 1982
- Genre: Funk; R&B; rock
- Length: 7" edit: 3:28; Album/12": 8:04
- Label: Warner Bros.
- Songwriter: Prince
- Producers: Morris Day, Prince (as The Starr ★ Company)

The Time singles chronology
"Girl" (1981)	"777-9311" (1982)	"The Walk" (1982)

"777-9311" is the second track and lead single from The Time's second album, What Time Is It?. Recorded for the album at Prince's home studio in May–June 1982, the song was produced, arranged, composed and performed by Prince with Morris Day later adding his lead vocals.

The funky song opens with a drum machine beat, adds guitar, live playing on the cymbals, and finally the bass and keyboards. A similar extended version of this occurs after the main lyrics, but starts with the bass and also includes a lengthy rock guitar solo. The bass is truly the "star" of this song, and Prince has remarked that this is one of his signature basslines, remarking no one can play the line like himself. He also said the same about the bassline of "Let's Work". Despite the song being performed entirely by Prince, Day calls out "Terry" before the bass solo. The drumbeat is also notable for its intricately programmed hi-hat pattern and its off-beat snare, utilizing an on-beat clap during the choruses and outro.

In a Facebook post from 2014, Jesse Johnson stated that the beat was a stock drumbeat from the Linn LM-1, programmed by Tower of Power drummer David Garibaldi, and that Prince played the guitar using his Hondo Stratocaster. However Garibaldi himself denied playing the beat in an article for Reverb.

The U.S. 7-inch single was backed with a non-album track, "Grace", which is a mock-interview between a cocky Day and an interviewer named Bridgette (played by Bridgette Harrington, who was Prince's accountants secretary), who Day keeps referring to as "Grace." The 12-inch single was backed with "The Walk", where Morris also banters with Vanity and calls her "Grace," though it is not known if it is meant to be the reporter once again.

"777-9311" reached number two on the R&B charts and number 88 on the pop charts. It is one of The Time's signature numbers and is played at nearly all of their concerts. A version recorded live in a 1998 concert segues from "Get It Up" and was included on Day's 2004 album, It's About Time.

The song's title, "777-9311", was Prince guitarist Dez Dickerson's actual telephone number at the time the song was written. Once the song became a hit, the phone calls started coming in, and Dickerson ended up having to change his phone number.

== Personnel ==
Credits sourced from Prince Vault

- Morris Day - lead and backing vocals
- Prince - backing vocals, Linn LM-1, Oberheim OB-X, ARP Omni-2, bass guitar, electric guitar, cymbals
- David Garibaldi - Linn LM-1

== Appearances in other media ==
- Rapper 2Pac sampled "777-9311" in his song "Whatz Ya Phone #?" from the album All Eyez On Me.
- Rapper Sir Mix-A-Lot's 1989 single "Beepers", from his album Seminar, refers to this track; during a breakdown, a simulated SkyPager operator says "you wish to send message, 777-9311, enter numeric message or press the pound key now."
- Rapper Kutt Calhoun referenced this song on "School Daze" from the album Feature Presentation.
- Rapper / producer Madlib referenced this song on "Pillz", the b-side from the 12" single "McNasty Filth" by Jaylib from the album Champion Sound.
- MC Common referenced the number "777-9311" in his song "Puppy Chow" from the album Can I Borrow a Dollar?.
- Gospel artist J Moss samples this song as the backing track for his single "Dance" featuring Kirk Franklin.
- Actress-singer Tichina Arnold sampled this song as the slower backing track for her song "I Know You Want Me" from the album "Soul Free".
- Rapper Andre Nickatina referenced this number on "Upgrade Call" from the album Horns and Halos.

== Charts ==
=== Weekly charts ===
Chart (1982)	Peak position
US Billboard Hot 100	88
US Hot R&B/Hip-Hop Songs (Billboard)	2
US Dance Club Songs (Billboard)	42

== See also ==
- 867-5309
- Beechwood 4-5789
- Pennsylvania 6-5000
