= Shockadelica (album) =

Studio album by Jesse Johnson
- Released: September 15, 1986
- Genres: Funk rock, Minneapolis sound
- Length: 40:16
- Label: A&M Records
- Producer: Jesse Johnson

Jesse Johnson albums chronology
Jesse Johnson's Revue (1985)	Shockadelica (1986)	Every Shade of Love (1988)

Professional ratings
Review scores
Source	Rating
AllMusic	4/5 stars

Shockadelica is the second studio album by guitarist and songwriter Jesse Johnson. It was released on September 15, 1986, on A&M Records and peaked at number 70 on the U.S. Billboard 200 albums chart.

== Background ==
According to Johnson, "Shockadelica" was a term he had used for years to describe an excited feeling he got from a song or woman. Prince, upon learning that the album did not have a title track, recorded a song for himself called "Shockadelica" and released it prior to Johnson's album, leaving the impression that Johnson had stolen the name. However, the release of "Shockadelica" as the B-side of "If I Was Your Girlfriend" only took place in 1987.

The album is notable for featuring funk musician Sly Stone on the single, "Crazay". The album features songs that primarily consist of mainstream funk; an exception is the album's closing track, "Black in America", which received attention because of its title. Johnson remarked that it was misleading. "The song is really about a universal situation where no matter what you do or who you are, people see you as a black or Jew."

== Track listing ==
All tracks are written by Johnson, except where noted.

No.	Title	Writer(s)	Length
1.	"Change Your Mind"		4:09
2.	"Crazay" (Featuring Sly Stone)		4:02
3.	"Baby Let's Kiss"		3:42
4.	"A Better Way"		3:52
5.	"Do Yourself A Favor"	Pepé Willie	3:55
6.	"She (I Can't Resist)"		4:51
7.	"Addiction"		4:13
8.	"Tonite"		4:01
9.	"Burn You Up"		4:23
10.	"Black In America"		2:53

== Charts ==
Chart (1986–1987)	Peak position
US Billboard 200	70
US Top R&B/Hip-Hop Albums (Billboard)	17
