= PrimeTel Communications =

Telecommunications company in United States

PrimeTel Communications is a telecommunications company in Philadelphia, Pennsylvania, nominally a service provider for toll-free telephone numbers. Founded in 1995, it is known for amassing large quantities of 800 numbers to redirect misdialed phone calls to erotic chat lines operated by National A-1, an affiliated company. PrimeTel acquires numbers that were previously registered and advertised, resulting in embarrassment when they advertise erotic chat lines. The company controls 1.7 million 800 numbers, as well as millions of numbers on other prefixes.

The company was founded by Richard Cohen and Sandra Kessler. Cohen serves as PrimeTel's CEO.

== Toll-free number hoarding ==
In 2010, National A-1's six RespOrgs operated 1.9 million toll free +1-800 numbers out of the 7.8 million possible numbers and were also occupying millions of numbers in other toll-free area codes. The numbers are worth an estimated $1 billion. While the six organizations have distinct names, they are simply called PrimeTel in the industry. National A-1 was previously known as National Telephone Enterprises.

In theory, the hoarding of millions of toll-free telephone numbers is prohibited by CFR 2010 Title 47 section § 52.105 Warehousing and § 52.107 Hoarding. The latter section states, in part:

1. Toll free subscribers shall not hoard toll free numbers.
2. No person or entity shall acquire a toll free number for the purpose of selling the toll free number to another entity or to a person for a fee.
3. Routing multiple toll free numbers to a single toll free subscriber will create a rebuttable presumption that the toll free subscriber is hoarding or brokering toll free numbers.

The Federal Communications Commission, which is responsible for the CFR Title 47 regulation, has never taken formal action against PrimeTel or National A-1.

Only a handful of individual complaints have received a response from the FCC. Robert and Lucyanna Westfall's 1998 complaint to the FCC was dismissed after an out of court settlement turned over the one disputed number to the complainants.

In a September 2011 FCC complaint, attorneys for Robert Liff, a prospective subscriber for a number in disconnect, objected that their client was unable to obtain the number +1-888-PROGRESS as it was directly ported from Verizon to Yorkshire, one of multiple RespOrgs under PrimeTel, without ever having been placed in the spare pool. The complaint alleged that PrimeTel's dummy company had falsely claimed to have a subscriber which had inadvertently used the number in advertising, marketing, and/or promotional materials as a pretext to obtain a letter of authorisation from the previous subscriber, which was Progress Inc. of Pipestone, Minnesota. Progress (a non-profit providing employment and training to the developmentally delayed). With this letter of authorisation, the number was not released on a first-come, first-served basis as legally required, but transferred directly to Yorkshire. As of 2013, +1-888-PROGRESS remains under the control of Yorkshire.

== Internet domains and 2010 raid ==
National A-1 was raided in 2010 related to a prostitution ring, related to its operation of escorts.com and hotmovies.com. In 2011, the company pled guilty to money laundering, forfeiting $4.9 million in proceeds from escorts.com and paying an additional $1.5 million fine. Hotmovies.com grossed $20 million in 2006.

The company also owned free.com, babies.com, sextoys.com, GayMovies.com, MovieDollars.com, Clips.com, catnip.com, poker.org, camps.com, antiques.com, fun.com, contests.com, golflessons.com, boys.com, girls.com, teens.com. and divorce.com. Richard Cohen and his staff have used pseudonyms "Rick London," "R.S. Duffy" and "Jennifer Luna" as contact information and to register Internet-domain names.
