= Jesse Johnson's Revue =

Studio album by Jesse Johnson
- Released: 1985
- Recorded: 1984−1985
- Studio: Jungle Love Studios
- Genres: Funk; R&B
- Length: 41:23
- Label: A&M
- Producer: Jesse Johnson

Jesse Johnson chronology
Jesse Johnson's Revue (1985)	Shockadelica (1986)

Singles from Jesse Johnson's Revue
- 1. "Be Your Man" Released: 1985; 2. "Can You Help Me" Released: 1985; 3. "I Want My Girl" Released: 1985

Professional ratings
Review scores
Source	Rating
AllMusic	3/5 stars

Jesse Johnson's Revue is the debut studio album from American R&B musician Jesse Johnson, released in 1985 via A&M Records. The album peaked at #43 on the Billboard 200 and at #8 on the Billboard R&B chart.

Three singles were released from the album: "Be Your Man", "Can You Help Me" and "I Want My Girl". "Be Your Man" was the most successful single from the album, peaking at #61 on the Billboard Hot 100 in 1985.

== Track listing ==
All tracks are written by Jesse Johnson.

No.	Title	Length
1.	"Be Your Man"	6:49
2.	"I Want My Girl"	4:46
3.	"She Won't Let Go"	3:30
4.	"Just Too Much"	6:32
5.	"Let's Have Some Fun"	5:01
6.	"Can You Help Me"	5:22
7.	"Special Love"	4:25
8.	"She's a Doll"	4:58
Total length:		41:23

== Personnel ==
- Jesse Johnson: Guitars, Vocals
- Michael Baker: Guitars, Backing Vocals
- Mark Cardenas, Tim Bradley: Keyboards, Backing Vocals
- Gerry Hubbard: Bass, Backing Vocals
- Bobby Vandell: Drums, Vocals

== Production ==
- Arranged and Produced by Jesse Johnson for JWJ Productions
- Recorded and mixed by David Rivkin, Jesse Johnson and Peter Martinsen (Recorded and mixed at Jungle Love Studios)
- Mastered by Bernie Grundman at Bernie Grundman Mastering
- All songs published by Crazy People Music/Almo Music

== Chart positions ==
Chart (1985)	Peak position
US Billboard 200	43
US R&B Albums (Billboard)	8
