= The Bird (The Time song) =

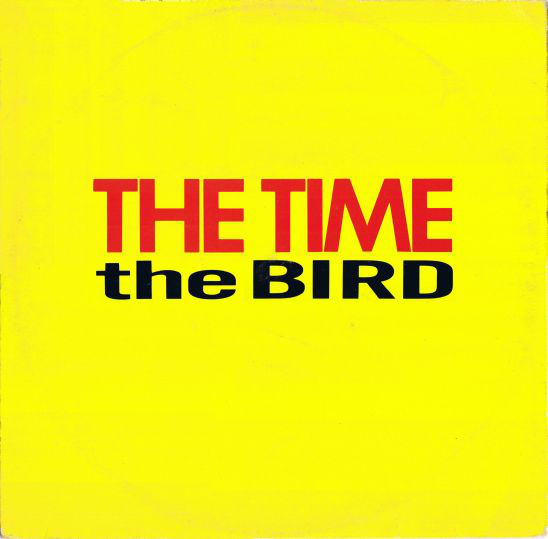
- U.S. 12-inch single

Single by the Time

from the album Ice Cream Castle
- A-side: "The Bird"
- B-side: "My Drawers"
- Written: 1983
- Published: 1984
- Released: 1985
- Recorded: October 4, 1983
- Venue: First Avenue
- Genre: Rock
- Length: 7-inch edit: 3:41 album: 7:40 dance remix: 6:25
- Label: Warner Bros.
- Composers: Prince (as Jamie Starr), Morris Day, Jesse Johnson
- Lyricist: Prince
- Producer: Prince

The Time singles chronology
"Jungle Love" (1984)	"The Bird" (1985)	"Jerk Out" (1990)

Purple Rain singles chronology
I Would Die 4 U (1984)	The Bird (1984)	Take Me With U (1984)

"The Bird" is a song from the Time's third album, Ice Cream Castle. The song was initially recorded in the studio in 1983 with all instruments by Prince, except guitar, which was performed by Jesse Johnson. This version was replaced by a live recording with the full band at the First Avenue on October 4, 1983. This is the first Time song to be released featuring the Time as a band, rather than primarily Prince with Morris Day on vocals.

Two more live versions have been released: one on Prince's Rave Un2 the Year 2000 DVD, and one recorded at the House of Blues in 1998 for Morris Day's 2004 album It's About Time.

== Background ==
The song suggests that by dancing "the bird", one can overcome their troubles. "The Bird" uses both a drum machine and live drumming by Jellybean Johnson. A "Dance Remix" of the song was released as a 12" single. The B-side to the single was the rocker, "My Drawers".

== Reception ==
John Leland of Spin said the song, "comes close enough to capturing the band's leopard-skin razzle-dazzle to give the overextended Kid a run for his considerable money. The best song from Purple Rain is the best slice of black rock on the market."

== Personnel ==
Credits sourced from Duane Tudahl

- Morris Day – lead vocals
- Prince – electric guitar, synthesizers, bass guitar; music box (demo and album versions)
- Jesse Johnson – electric guitar, backing vocals
- St. Paul Peterson – synthesizers, backing vocals
- Mark Cardenas – synthesizers, backing vocals
- Jellybean Johnson – drums, Linn LM-1, backing vocals
- Jerome Benton – percussion, backing vocals
- Jerry Hubbard – backing vocals

== Charts ==
Chart performance for "The Bird"
Chart (1985)	Peak position
US Billboard Hot 100	36
US Billboard Hot Dance/Disco	6
US Billboard Hot Black Singles	33
