= Girl (The Time song) =

- 7" single cover

Single by The Time

from the album The Time
- B-side: "The Stick"
- Released: April 1982
- Recorded: Minneapolis, Minnesota, April 1981
- Genre: R&B
- Length: 7" edit: 3:40; Album: 5:36
- Label: Warner Bros.
- Songwriter(s): Prince (as Jamie Starr)
- Producer(s): Prince (as The Starr ★ Company)

The Time singles chronology
"Cool" (1981)	"Girl" (1982)	"777-9311" (1982)

"Girl" was the final single released from the Time's debut album. Like most of the album, the song was recorded in Prince's home studio in April 1981, and was produced, arranged, composed and performed by Prince with Morris Day later adding his lead vocals. The single reached number 49 on the U.S. R&B singles chart.

The tender ballad is built around the piano and synthesizers and features live drumming and bass. The emotional lyrics delivered by Day tell of a difficult breakup and that he is still in love with the song's subject. Although Day is the only one on lead and backing vocals, Prince's influence on how they were arranged are unmistakable.

The U.S. 7" single was backed with an edit of album track, "The Stick", a funky number which was written by Revolution member Lisa Coleman (uncredited), who also provided background vocals. Another uncredited Revolution member was Doctor Fink, who provided synthesizer solos for the track. A 12" single was not released.

Though not one of their biggest hits, "Girl" is often played in concert and a live version of the song recorded at the House of Blues in 1998 and was included on Morris Day's 2004 album, It's About Time.

Prince wrote a completely different song entitled "Girl" in 1985, which became the B-side of the "America" single in the U.S. and the B-side of "Pop Life" in Europe (both released in 1985).

== Personnel ==
Credits sourced from Prince Vault and Guitarcloud (Note: Due to the similar recording times, most of the equipment can be identified by looking at the most recent album Prince made, which in this case is Dirty Mind.)

- Morris Day - lead and backing vocals, drums
- Prince - Yamaha CP-70 electric grand piano, ARP Omni, electric guitar, bass guitar
