= Get It Up =

1981 song by The Time

- 7" single cover

Single by the Time

from the album The Time
- B-side: "After Hi School"
- Released: June 26, 1981
- Recorded: April 1981
- Studio: Minneapolis, Minnesota
- Genre: Minneapolis sound; post-disco; funk; rock
- Length: 3:01 (7" edit); 9:08 (album version)
- Label: Warner Bros.
- Songwriter: Prince
- Producers: Morris Day; Prince (as "Jamie Starr")

The Time singles chronology
"Get It Up" (1981)	"Cool" (1981)

"Get It Up" is the debut single by American funk rock band the Time, from their 1981 self-titled debut album.

== History ==
Like most of the album, the song was recorded in Prince's home studio in April 1981, and was produced, arranged, composed and performed by Prince with Morris Day later adding his lead vocals. Revolution keyboardist Doctor Fink provided synth solos on the track, uncredited.

The funk-pop number relies on synthesizers and contains numerous solos throughout the song. The song is propelled by a strong bass line and contains live drums and handclaps. A raunchy guitar solo provides a rock element to the funky track. "Get It Up" is basically an ode to sex and Day's attempts to get some. Prince's vocals are very apparent in the song, both in the background and the lead at times.

"Get It Up" was only released as a 7" single with the poppy "After Hi School" as its B-side. "After Hi School", while not an outstanding effort was composed by Dez Dickerson and is perhaps the strongest pop effort on the album. Along with the track "Cool", "Get It Up" peaked at number six on the US Billboard Hot R&B singles chart, and at number 16 on the Disco Top 80 chart. The full version of "Get It Up" was later a B-side for the 12" single of "Ice Cream Castles" in 1984. "Get It Up" is one of The Time's more popular numbers, and a live version of the song recorded at the House of Blues in 1998 was included on Morris Day's 2004 album, It's About Time where it segues into "777-9311".

== Personnel ==
Credits sourced from Prince Vault and Guitarcloud (Note: Due to the similar recording times, most of the equipment can be identified by looking at the most recent album Prince made, which in this case is Dirty Mind.)

- Morris Day - lead and backing vocals
- Prince - backing vocals, Oberheim OB-X, ARP Omni, electric guitar, bass guitar, drums, handclaps
- Dr. Fink - Oberheim OB-X (solo)
- Sue Ann Carwell - backing vocals

== TLC version ==
"Get It Up"

Single by TLC

from the album Poetic Justice: Music from the Motion Picture
- Released: June 6, 1993
- Studio: Studio LaCoCo; Darp Studios
- Genre: R&B; dance-pop; new jack swing; funk
- Length: 4:23 (album version); 4:00 (radio edit)
- Label: Arista
- Songwriter: Prince
- Producers: Tim & Bob; Dallas Austin

TLC singles chronology
"Hat 2 da Back" (1992)	"Get It Up" (1993)	"Creep" (1994)

Music video
- "Get It Up" on YouTube

"Get It Up" was covered by American girl group TLC for the soundtrack to the 1993 film Poetic Justice, becoming a major hit for the group and was later included in TLC's first greatest hits album, Now and Forever: The Hits (2003). The music video for "Get It Up" was shot in June 1993.

=== Critical reception ===
AllMusic named “Get It Up” one of the highlights on the Poetic Justice soundtrack. Writing for The Guardian, English journalist Alexis Petridis placed "Get It Up" at number 19 on his 2022 ranking of TLC's "20 greatest songs", describing it as a "track that’s aged noticeably better than Poetic Justice," adding that it "brilliantly slows down the synth riff from the Time’s 1981 Prince-produced version, turning it into a sleazy electronic buzz."

=== Track listings and formats ===
Europe 12" single

1. "Get It Up" (12" remix) – 6:36
2. "Get It Up" (12" hip-hop remix) – 5:49
3. "Get It Up" (radio edit) – 4:00
4. "Get It Up" (LP version) – 4:23
5. "Get It Up" (hip-hop radio mix) – 4:00
6. "Get It Up" (Quiet Storm mix) – 4:20

Europe CD single

1. "Get It Up" (radio edit) – 4:00
2. "Get It Up" (12" remix) – 6:36
3. "Get It Up" (12" hip-hop remix) – 5:49
4. "Get It Up" (Quiet Storm mix) – 4:20
5. "Get It Up" (hip-hop radio mix) – 4:00

=== Personnel ===
Credits adapted from the liner notes of the CD single.

- TLC – vocals, background vocals
- Prince – songwriting
- Dallas Austin – producer, keyboards, drum programming
- Tim & Bob – producer, keyboards, background vocals
- Carlton Batts – mastering
- Sean McNally – drums
- Debra Killings – bass, background vocals
- Theophilus Glass – background vocals
- Darin Prindle – recording engineer
- Russ Fowler – recording engineer
- Paul Rankin – assistant engineer
- Alex Lowe – assistant engineer
- Darin Prindle – mixing engineer
- Rick Sheppard – MIDI programming
- Antonio "L.A." Reid – executive producer
- Kenneth "Babyface" Edmonds – executive producer

=== Charts ===
==== Weekly charts ====
Chart (1993)	Peak position
Australia (ARIA)	168
Europe (European Dance Radio)	13
New Zealand (Recorded Music NZ)	25
US Billboard Hot 100	42
US Dance Singles Sales (Billboard)	3
US Hot R&B/Hip-Hop Songs (Billboard)	15
US Rhythmic Airplay (Billboard)	14
US Cash Box Top 100	33

==== Year-end charts ====
Chart (1993)	Position
US Hot R&B/Hip-Hop Songs (Billboard)	76
US Cash Box Top 100	41
