= KVBV =

- Buena Vista, Colorado; United States
- Frequency: 1450 kHz

Programming
- Format: News/talk

Ownership
- Owner: High Plains Radio Network, LLC

History
- First air date: 1986
- Last air date: 2024
- Former call signs: KDMN (1986–2004); KSKE (2004–2020)

Technical information
- Licensing authority: FCC
- Facility ID: 1153
- Class: C
- Power: 250 watts (unlimited)
- Transmitter coordinates: 38°49′7″N 106°9′36.1″W

Links
- Public license information: Public file; LMS

KVBV (1450 AM) was a radio station licensed to serve Buena Vista, Colorado, United States. The station, which operated from 1986 to 2024, was last owned by High Plains Radio Network, LLC. KVBV broadcast a news/talk radio format.

== History ==
=== The beginning ===
This station received its original construction permit from the Federal Communications Commission on March 5, 1986. The new station was assigned the KDMN call sign by the FCC on April 10, 1986. KDMN received its license to cover from the FCC on September 29, 1986.

In August 1987, Buena Vista Broadcasters reached an agreement to sell this station to Robert D. & Marjorie M. Zellmer. The deal was approved by the FCC on September 15, 1987, and the transaction was consummated on October 21, 1987.

=== The 1990s ===
In January 1989, Robert D. & Marjorie M. Zellmer, reached an agreement to sell this station to Randall S. & Dorothy J. Jacobson. The deal was approved by the FCC on March 16, 1989, and the transaction was consummated on April 10, 1989. In December 1989, Randall S. & Dorothy J. Jacobson applied to transfer the broadcast license for KDMN to the Alpine Broadcasting Corporation. The transfer was approved by the FCC on March 21, 1990, and the transaction was consummated on May 16, 1990.

In October 1995, Alpine Broadcasting Corporation reached an agreement to sell this station to Rocky Mountain Radio Network, Inc. The deal was approved by the FCC on March 6, 1996, but the deal was never consummated and control of KDMN remained with Alpine. In September 1997, Alpine Broadcasting Corporation reached a new agreement to sell this station, this time to Pilgrim Communications, Inc. The deal was approved by the FCC on December 11, 1997, and the transaction was consummated on May 18, 1998.

=== Change to KSKE ===
The station was assigned new call sign KSKE on September 9, 2004. The change accompanied a format change to business talk radio.

In December 2008, Pilgrim Communications, Inc., reached an agreement to sell this station to Rocky Mountain Radio, LLC. The deal was approved by the FCC on February 26, 2009, but was never consummated.

Effective June 5, 2017, Pilgrim Communications sold KSKE to High Plains Radio Network, LLC for $35,000. The call letters were changed to KVBV on June 25, 2020.

The KVBV license was canceled on May 5, 2025, as the station had been silent for a year.

== God's phone number ==
In May 2003, KDMN and its Radio Colorado Network sister stations became a target of prank calls when the Jim Carrey movie Bruce Almighty revealed God's phone number in several scenes. The number, 776–2323, was coincidentally the same as the station group's call center and several other people across the United States. The station group turned the unexpected attention into a contest with callers asked "what they would say to God" if it were actually possible to call him on the telephone.
