= Pandemonium (The Time album) =

Studio album by The Time
- Released: July 10, 1990
- Recorded: 1981–1990
- Studio: Paisley Park, Chanhassen
- Genre: Funk rock
- Length: 65:12
- Label: Paisley Park; Reprise 27490
- Producer: The Time; Prince

The Time chronology
Ice Cream Castle (1984)	Pandemonium (1990)	Condensate (2011)

Singles from Pandemonium
- 1. "Jerk Out" Released: June 28, 1990; 2. "Chocolate" Released: October 1, 1990

Professional ratings
Review scores
Source	Rating
AllMusic	3/5 stars
Select	4/5 medals

Pandemonium is the fourth studio album by American band The Time released in 1990. Much like the three previous albums, the album consists of music in the funk rock genre, although this album breaks the Time's six-song album tradition. The album is a tie-in with the film Graffiti Bridge, and several songs from the album appear in the film.

According to biographer Matt Thorne, Prince co-wrote "Donald Trump (Black Version)". The album was certified Gold by the RIAA and "Jerk Out" became one of the band's biggest singles. The second single, "Chocolate" did not fare as well.

== Critical reception ==
"The songs' obsessions with sex, food and time scream 'concept'," remarked Michele Kirsch in a 4 out of 5 review for Select, "but only in a fun, sexy, blaxploitation movie soundtrack kind of way. Lots of background jive talk, chat up lines and bogus off-tape comments make you feel like you're gatecrashing a party at the point where everybody pairs off to go to his or her place… Bastard sons of George Clinton, take a bow."

== Track listing ==
Pandemonium track listing
No.	Title	Writer(s)	Producer(s)	Length
1.	"Dreamland"	Prince	The Time	3:08
2.	"Pandemonium"	Harris; Johnson; Lewis; Prince	The Time	4:11
3.	"Sexy Socialites"			0:23
4.	"Jerk Out"	Morris Day; Harris; Lewis; Prince	The Time	6:49
5.	"Yount"			0:22
6.	"Blondie"	Harris; Johnson; Lewis	The Time	6:27
7.	"Donald Trump (Black Version)"	The Time; Prince	The Time	4:33
8.	"Chocolate"	Prince	Prince	7:31
9.	"Cooking Class"			0:42
10.	"Skillet"	Harris; Johnson; Lewis	The Time	6:11
11.	"It's Your World"	Harris; Lewis	The Time	5:25
12.	"Sometimes I Get Lonely"	Day; Harris; Lewis; Monte Moir	The Time	6:15
13.	"Data Bank"	Prince	The Time	5:36
14.	"My Summertime Thang"	The Time	The Time	6:52
15.	"Pretty Little Women"			0:46

== Singles ==
- "Jerk Out" (#1 R&B, #9 Pop)
1. "Jerk Out"
2. "Mo' Jerk Out" – 7" single
3. "Get It Up" – 12" single
4. "Jerk Out" (Sexy Mix) – 12" single
5. "Jerk Out" (Sexy Edit) – 12" single
6. "Jerk Out" (A Capella) – 12" single
7. "Jerk Out" (Sexy Dub) – 12" single
8. "Jerk Out" (Sexy Instrumental) – 12" single
- "Chocolate" (#44 R&B)
1. "Chocolate"
2. "My Drawers"
3. "Chocolate" (12 Inch Remix) – 12" single
4. "Chocolate" (Tootsie Roll Club Mix) – 12" single
5. "Chocolate" (Instrumental) – 12" single
6. "Chocolate" (Percapella) – 12" single

== Personnel ==
- Morris Day – lead vocals
- Jellybean Johnson, Jerome Benton, Jesse Johnson, Jill Jones, Jimmy Jam, Karyn White, Margie Cox, Monte Moir, Terry Lewis – background vocals
- Terry Lewis – bass
- Jellybean Johnson – drums
- Jerome Benton – percussion
- Jesse Johnson – guitar
- Jimmy Jam – keyboards
- Candy Dulfer – saxophone
- Monte Moir – keyboards
- Steve Hodge – engineer
- Benny Medina – executive producer
- Femi Jiya – engineer
- Brian Gardner – mastering
- Tom Garneau – engineer
- The Time – producer, arranger, composition

== Charts ==
=== Weekly charts ===
Weekly chart performance for Pandemonium
Chart (1990)	Peak position
UK Albums (OCC)	66
US Billboard 200	18
US Top R&B/Hip-Hop Albums (Billboard)	9

=== Year-end charts ===
Year-end chart performance for Pandemonium
Chart (1990)	Position
US Top R&B/Hip-Hop Albums (Billboard)	49

== Certifications ==
Certifications for Pandemonium
Region	Certification	Certified units/sales
United States (RIAA)	Gold	500,000^{^}
^{^} Shipments figures based on certification alone.
