= Poker.org =

Poker media site

Poker.Org
- Company type: Private
- Industry: Poker
- Founded: 2001
- Headquarters: Douglas, Isle of Man
- Area served: Worldwide
- Key people: Eric Hollreiser (CEO); Brad Willis (Editor-in-chief); Sarah Herring (Head of Instant Media)
- Parent: Triple Barrel Media Limited
- Website: poker.org

Poker.Org is a poker media site that breaks poker news and provides poker features, strategy, player interviews, videos and live tournament coverage. It is run by Triple Barrel Media, a company owned by Eric Hollreiser, who was former VP Corporate Communications & Manager at PokerStars.

Poker.Org's editor-in-chief is Brad Willis, a poker industry veteran who founded the PokerStars blog in 2005. Willis ran the PokerStars blog for 17 years before joining Poker.Org. Willis won the first American Poker Award for Poker Media Content of the Year in 2015. Sarah Herring joined as Head of Instant Media in November 2022, after leaving PokerNews where she was Head of Video and Podcasting. Herring was named Poker Journalist of the Year in 2018 at the Global Poker Index Awards.

== History ==
Poker.Org was originally an affiliate marketing site that pushed web traffic to a now-defunct online poker room Holdem.com in 2003. In February 2010, Poker.Org became the most expensive .org site ever when it was sold for $1m to PokerCompany.com.

Poker.Org was acquired by Hollreiser in 2022. Hollreiser hired Chris Herd (former Global Creative Director of PokerStars) as Creative Director and Dave Woods (former launch editor of PokerPlayer magazine) as Content & Commercial Director.
