= Every Shade of Love =

Studio album by Jesse Johnson
- Released: 1988
- Studio: Jungle Love
- Genre: Funk, funk rock
- Label: A&M
- Producer: Jesse Johnson

Jesse Johnson chronology
Shockadelica (1986)	Every Shade of Love (1988)	Bare My Naked Soul (1996)

Every Shade of Love is the third album by the American musician Jesse Johnson, released in 1988. The first single was "Love Struck". Johnson supported the album with a North American tour that included shows with Grandmaster Flash and the Furious Five. Every Shade of Love peaked at No. 79 on the Billboard 200.

== Production ==
Recorded at Johnson's Minneapolis studio, Jungle Love, Every Shade of Love was written and produced by Johnson. He recorded much of the album in one-takes, after deciding that his first two albums lacked emotion. While aiming to keep the songs suitable for the dance floor, Johnson focused more on his guitar playing; he was influenced primarily by Jimi Hendrix. Johnson considered the album to be a song cycle about the phases of love.

== Critical reception ==
Professional ratings
Review scores
Source	Rating
All Music Guide to Soul	3/5 stars
The Kansas City Star	3/4 stars
Los Angeles Times	2/4 stars
MusicHound Rock: The Essential Album Guide	3/5 stars
The Philadelphia Inquirer	3/4 stars

The Star Tribune opined, "Musically, it's a funk-rock masterwork... Johnson comes up short in the lyrics department, however. His words about love show little depth and imagination." The Los Angeles Times called the album "a solid set of punchy dance grooves, distinguished by Johnson's castles-made-of-sand, Hendrix-derived fretwork... All of which only reinforces the suspicion that anything Prince can do, everyone else will do a year later." The New York Times said that Johnson "writes armor-plated funk in the style of Prince but without Prince's irony or sense of humor—the groove rules, and it's the message... This is nonstop dance music, with the aura of the last-set-Saturday-night; each instrument pegs a passing upbeat, and his instrumental sections seem to levitate."

The Philadelphia Inquirer labeled the guitar solo on "So Misunderstood" "a model of the funk form." The Evening Advertiser stated that Johnson "applies shards of frazzled electric guitar over crisp, jumping rhythms". The Independent praised the "fierce skeletal feeling" and "the impression that [the] music is being hammered together by androids on the spot". The Buffalo News called Johnson "one of the premier funk artists of the decade"; the paper later listed his album among the best of 1988. The Gloucestershire Echo deemed Every Shade of Love "warm, musicianly dance music par excellence."

== Track listing ==
No.	Title	Length
1.	"Love Struck"
2.	"So Misunderstood"
3.	"I'm the One"
4.	"Color Shock"
5.	"Every Shade of Love"
6.	"Everybody Wants Somebody to Love"
7.	"I'm Just Wanting You"
8.	"Stop-Look-Listen"
