= Ice Cream Castle =

Studio album by The Time
- Released: July 2, 1984
- Recorded: March 26, 1983–January 1984
- Genre: Funk; pop; Minneapolis sound
- Length: 38:19
- Label: Warner Bros.
- Producer: Prince (as The Starr ★ Company), Morris Day

The Time chronology
| What Time Is It? (1982) | Ice Cream Castle (1984) | Pandemonium (1990) |

Singles from Ice Cream Castle
- 1. "Ice Cream Castles" Released: 1984; 2. "Jungle Love" Released: 1984; 3. "The Bird" Released: 1984

Ice Cream Castle is the third studio album by the American funk rock band The Time, being produced by Prince as "The Starr ★ Company". The album produced three singles: "Ice Cream Castles", "Jungle Love", and "The Bird".

== Recording ==
Sessions for the album began in late March 1983, at Sunset Sound, in Hollywood (while Prince and The Time were still on the 1999 Tour), beginning with "Jungle Love". "Chili Sauce" (under its original title, "Proposition #17") and "If the Kid Can't Make You Come" followed in mid-April 1983. Although Prince played the majority of the studio instrumentation on the album, members of The Time, particularly Jesse Johnson, made some contributions.

"The Bird" was recorded live by the band in early October 1983 at First Avenue in Minneapolis, after a studio recording was made earlier in 1983, but the live version was chosen for release instead. "Ice Cream Castles" and "My Drawers" were the final tracks recorded for the album in mid-January 1984.

Other tracks recorded and considered for the album included "My Summertime Thang" (recorded in late March 1983, and later released on The Time's fourth album Pandemonium). "Cloreen Baconskin" was recorded during the same two-day session in late March 1983, with Morris Day on drums and Prince on bass guitar, but isn't believed to have been intended for the album. The latter was later released as a part of the album Crystal Ball.

Later tracks considered for the album include "Chocolate" (released on Pandemonium), "My Love Belongs to You" and "Velvet Kitty Cat" (released on the deluxe edition of Purple Rain), all recorded in mid-April 1983.

== Release and reception ==
Professional ratings
Review scores
| Source | Rating |
|---|---|
| AllMusic | 3.5/5 stars |
| Funkatopia | 4.5/5 stars |
| Goldies Parade | 4/5 stars |
| Reviews & Dunn | B |

The album's two biggest hits, "Jungle Love" and "The Bird", were featured in the film Purple Rain and this, along with Day's performance in the movie, catapulted the album up the charts and to a crossover audience. The band didn't have time to enjoy the success, as they had disbanded by the time the movie was released.

The album peaked at number 24 on the Billboard 200 and number three on the Top Soul LPs charts. The album spent a total of 57 weeks on the US Billboard album charts and had reached its peak position in early March 1985. The album was eventually certified platinum by the Recording Industry Association of America (RIAA) for sales of over a million copies in the United States, being the group's best-selling album to date.

== Track listing ==
All tracks are written by Prince, except where noted (Note: The tracks were originally credited to members of The Time. However, the songs were officially registered with ASCAP with the writing credits seen here. Originally writing credits are marked.)

Side one
| No. | Title | Writer(s) | Length |
|---|---|---|---|
| 1. | "Ice Cream Castles (Note: Composition credited to Morris Day)" | Prince; Morris Day | 7:33 |
| 2. | "My Drawers" | | 4:04 |
| 3. | "Chili Sauce" | | 5:45 |

Side two
| No. | Title | Writer(s) | Length |
|---|---|---|---|
| 4. | "Jungle Love (Note: Composition credited to Morris Day and Jesse Johnson)" | Prince; Day | 5:29 |
| 5. | "If the Kid Can't Make You Come" | | 7:33 |
| 6. | "The Bird" | Prince; Day | 7:40 |

== Singles ==
- "Ice Cream Castles" (#11 R&B, #106 Pop)
1. "Ice Cream Castles"
2. "Tricky" (non-album track)
3. "Get It Up" – 12" single
- "Jungle Love" (#6 R&B, #20 Pop)
1. "Jungle Love"
2. "Oh, Baby" – 7" single
3. "Tricky" (non-album track) – NL 7" single, German 12" single
4. "The Bird" – 7" back-to-back single
- "The Bird" (#33 R&B, #36 Pop)
1. "The Bird"
2. "My Drawers"

== Personnel ==
Credits sourced from Duane Tudahl and Benoît Clerc

=== Musicians ===
==== The Time ====
- Morris Day – lead and backing vocals, drums (1, 2), Linn LM-1 (4)
- Jesse Johnson – electric guitars (all but 3), drums (5), backing vocals
- Paul Peterson – synthesizers (6), backing vocals
- Jerry Hubbard – bass guitar (credited), backing vocals
- Jerome Benton – percussion (6), backing vocals
- Jellybean Johnson – drums (6), Linn LM-1 (6), backing vocals
- Mark Cardenas – synthesizers (6), backing vocals

==== Additional musicians ====
- Prince (uncredited) – electric guitars (2, 6), synthesizers (3, 5, 6), Oberheim OB-8 (1, 2, 4), Yamaha CP-80 electric grand piano (3, 5), bass guitar (all but 4), Pearl SY-1 Syncussion (1, 2), percussion, music box (1, 6), Linn LM-1 (2), LinnDrum (3, 5), waiter vocal (3), backing vocals
- Sharon Hughes – additional vocals (3, 5)
- Jill Jones – backing vocals (2, 4)
- Novi Novog – violin (3)

=== Production ===
- Produced by Prince, Morris Day
- Recording engineers: David Leonard, Peggy Mac, Terry Christian
- Mastering: Bernie Grundman

== Charts ==
=== Weekly charts ===
Weekly chart performance for Ice Cream Castle
| Chart (1984) | Peak position |
|---|---|
| US Billboard 200 | 24 |
| US Top R&B/Hip-Hop Albums (Billboard) | 3 |

=== Year-end charts ===
1984 year-end chart performance for Ice Cream Castle
| Chart (1984) | Position |
|---|---|
| US Top R&B/Hip-Hop Albums (Billboard) | 27 |

1985 year-end chart performance for Ice Cream Castle
| Chart (1985) | Position |
|---|---|
| US Billboard 200 | 44 |
| US Top R&B/Hip-Hop Albums (Billboard) | 45 |

== Certifications ==
Certifications for Ice Cream Castle
| Region | Certification | Certified units/sales |
|---|---|---|
| United States (RIAA) | Platinum | 1,000,000^{^} |
^{^} Shipments figures based on certification alone.
