= The Time (band) =

American funk rock band

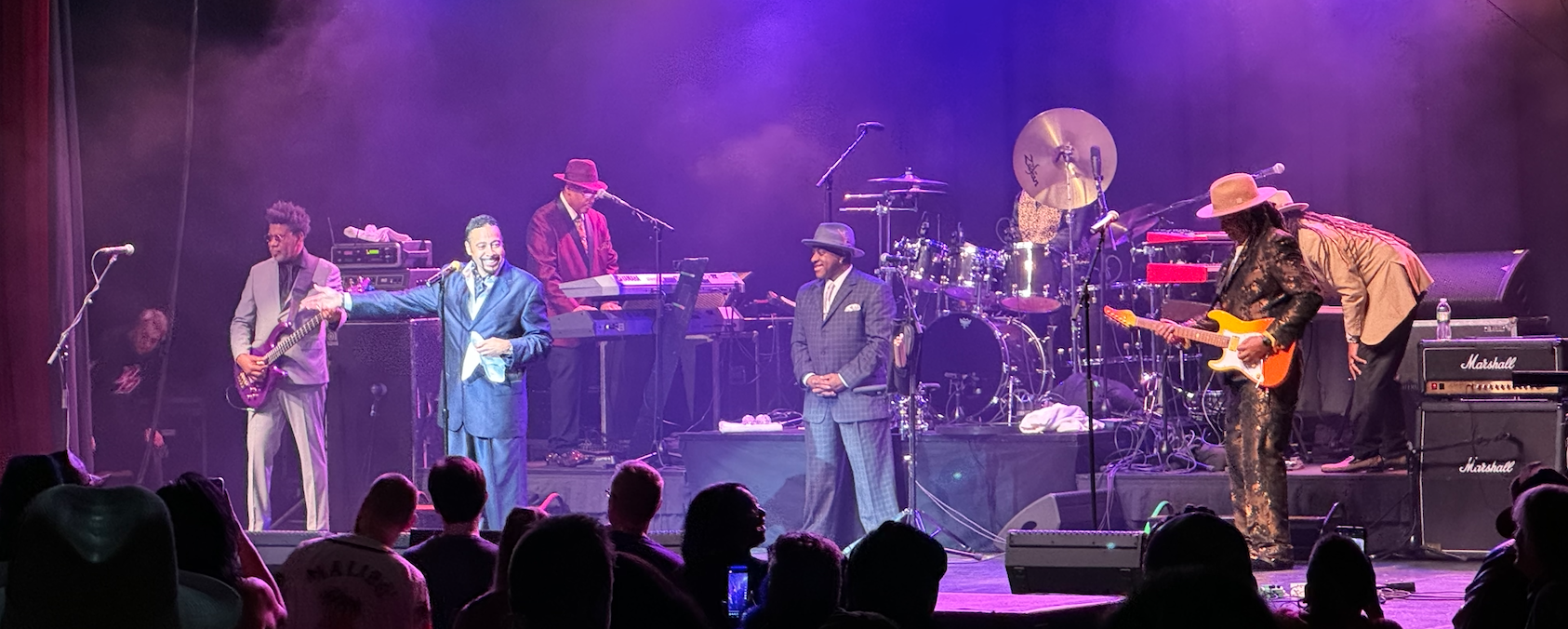
- Morris Day and the Time performing in 2024

Background information
- Also known as: The Original 7ven; Morris Day and the Time
- Origin: Minneapolis, Minnesota, U.S.
- Genres: Funk; soul; funk rock; R&B; Minneapolis sound
- Years active: 1981–1985; 1990–1991; 1995–present
- Labels: Warner Bros.; Paisley Park; Saguaro Road
- Members: Morris Day; Torrell "Tori" Ruffin; Ricky "Freeze" Smith; Sylvester Donald; Andre "PaDre" Holmes; Christopher Troy
- Past members: Jellybean Johnson; Jesse Johnson; Monte Moir; Jerome Benton; Jimmy Jam; Terry Lewis; Mark Cardenas; St. Paul Peterson; Rocky Harris; Gerry Hubbard; Stanley "Chance" Howard; Robert Grissett, Jr.; Morris Hayes; Brice Myles; Jeff "Jeffree Mak" McNeely; Cynthia Johnson; Alexander O'Neal; Jimmie L. Anderson; Tom Lund

The Time, later known as Morris Day and the Time and the Original 7ven, is an American funk rock band founded in Minneapolis in 1981. They contributed to the development of the Minneapolis sound, an eclectic fusion of funk, R&B, new wave, synth-pop and dance. Led by singer-songwriter Morris Day, the band members are known for having been close associates of musician Prince, and are arguably the most successful artists who have worked with him, achieving success with singles such as "Get It Up", "Cool", "777-9311", "Jungle Love", "The Bird" and "Jerk Out".

Former members Jimmy Jam and Terry Lewis went on to a prominent production career after they left the band in 1983, while Day and guitarist Jesse Johnson recorded solo material in addition to their work with the Time.

== Career ==
=== Prince and formation ===
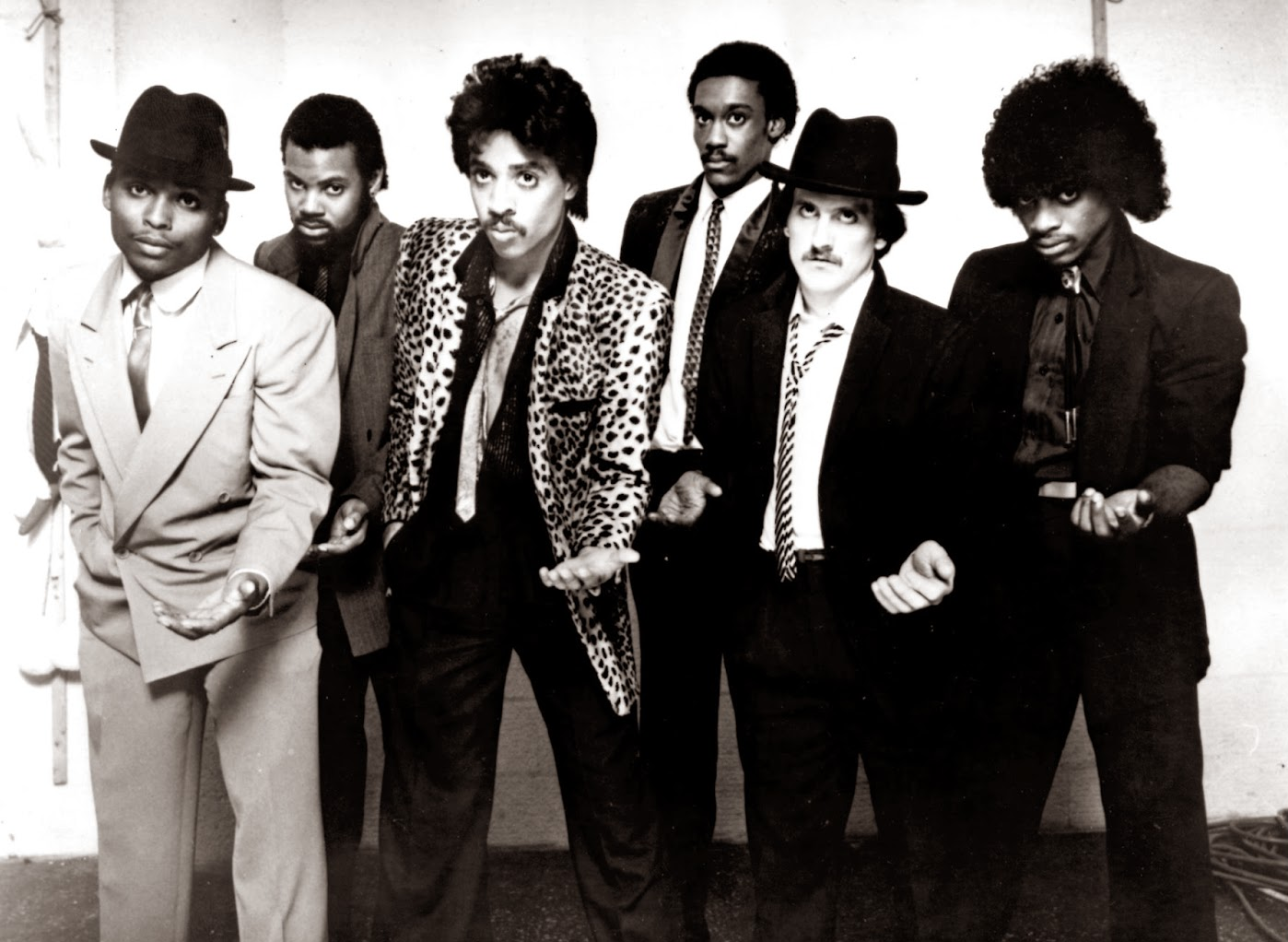
The Time in 1981. From left: Terry Lewis, Jimmy Jam, Morris Day, Jellybean Johnson, Monte Moir, and Jesse Johnson

The Time was assembled under a clause in Prince's contract with Warner Bros. that allowed him to recruit and produce other artists for the label. Inspired by the musical film The Idolmaker (1980), about a rock promoter, Prince decided to create a pop-funk group that would serve as an outlet for his material in the vein of his own early albums, while he explored other genres and styles in his own career.

By 1981, Prince had built the Time out of an existing Minneapolis funk/R&B unit, Flyte Tyme, which featured Alexander O'Neal on lead vocals and sax, Anton (Tony) Johnson on guitar, David Eiland on saxophone, Jellybean Johnson on drums, Jimmy Jam and Monte Moir on keyboards, and Terry Lewis on bass. To the last four were added Jesse Johnson on guitar and lead singer and childhood friend Morris Day, who would replace Alex as the lead singer after O'Neal was fired by Prince, plus Jerome Benton, a promoter drawn from "Enterprise", another local band, who became Day's comic foil.

=== Success ===
The band went on to release four albums, generally light and humorous in tone, strongly influenced by Funkadelic, Parliament, James Brown and Sly Stone. Although they scored numerous hits during the early 1980s, including "Cool" (1981), "Jungle Love" (1985), "777-9311", "Get It Up" (1981), "Gigolos Get Lonely Too", and "The Walk", mostly on the R&B charts, they never approached superstardom. With the exception of singer Morris Day, who was required to follow Prince's guide vocals note-for-note, none of the band played on the debut album. Prince instead played all the instruments himself, crediting the production to his alter-ego, "Jamie Starr", and Morris Day.

A rivalry developed between the Time and Prince's band the Revolution during their 1982 Controversy Tour. Frustrated with their lack of input on the albums bearing their name and at being underpaid, the Time would take to the stage with the intent of showing up Prince. On the final night of the tour in Cincinnati, during the Time's set, Prince and some of his band threw eggs at their supporting act from offstage. After the Time's performance, guitarist Jesse Johnson was handcuffed to a wall-mounted coat rack. Prince demanded no interruptions during his performance, but as soon as he left the stage, a food fight erupted. When the battle continued at the hotel, Prince held Morris Day responsible and made him pay for all damages.

During the 1982–83 1999/Triple Threat tour, the Time served as Vanity 6's backing band from behind a curtain, before playing their own hour-long set. They liked the arrangement because the band saw it as free money. Terry Lewis said, "I'll play behind Vanity 6 for thirty minutes for $250. No problem. I was going to have to do the sound check, anyway." Jimmy Jam and Terry Lewis, who had begun writing songs and producing albums of their own (working with SOLAR Records to produce Klymaxx and with Tabu Records to produce the S.O.S. Band), were stranded in Atlanta by a blizzard and failed to make it to a Time concert in San Antonio, for which Jerome had to mime playing bass guitar on stage while Prince played Lewis's part off stage, and Lisa Coleman stood in for Jimmy Jam. Subsequently, the duo were fined and then fired, although Prince would state in a 1990 Rolling Stone interview: "I didn't fire Jimmy and Terry. Morris asked me what I would do in his situation. You got to remember, it was his band." Whether their firing was due to the incident or to their increasing independence has never been clear. Monte Moir took the opportunity to leave as well, and would also work with Jam and Lewis. The three were replaced with Mark Cardenas and Paul Peterson on keyboards and Rocky Harris on bass. This new line up, with Jerry Hubbard replacing Rocky Harris, was featured in Prince's Purple Rain film. The Time rode the wave of popularity created by the movie and hit singles "Jungle Love" and "The Bird".

=== First split ===
Day left after arguments with Prince, choosing to pursue a solo career in 1985. With Jesse Johnson also opting to go solo (taking other Time members Cardenas and Hubbard with him), the band disintegrated. The remaining members (Benton, Jellybean Johnson and Peterson) were reformed into a new short-lived project called the Family. Meanwhile, Jimmy Jam and Terry Lewis went on to become one of the most successful songwriting and production teams of the 1980s and 1990s.

=== First reunion ===
In 1990, the original seven members of the band reunited for the Graffiti Bridge movie and soundtrack, as well as a new album, Pandemonium. The project was originally called Corporate World and was set to only feature Morris and Jerome, but Warner Bros. demanded that the original line-up be brought in if Prince wanted the company's backing for the movie. This spawned their highest selling single, "Jerk Out" and the album featured more input from the band than any other Time album. "Nobody really needed to put the Time back together," said Lewis, "but everybody wanted to. That makes it a great experience all round. We take the musicianship and the craft of what we do very seriously but, when the seven of us get together, it's naturally a party, fun kinda situation. We carry that from the record on to the stage."

The reunion was short-lived, as infighting within the band caused them to disband once again. Morris and Jerome have since remained a team, with both trying out some small acting roles over the next few years.

Several members of the Time reunited in 1995, added a few new recruits, Tori Ruffin on guitar, Chance Howard on keyboards, Robert GI' Grissett Jr. on third keyboards and Ricky "Freeze" Smith on bass guitar. This version of the band can be seen in the Kevin Smith film Jay and Silent Bob Strike Back and toured frequently usually billed as "Morris Day and the Time".

A fifth Time album was rumored to have been completed in the late 1990s, recorded with the new lineup, but production and coordination with Prince has prevented its release. Old Dogs, New Tricks was the working title. A 2004 album attributed to Morris Day called It's About Time contains a few new tracks written and performed by Day and a number of live performances by the Time featuring the new members along with Jellybean, Jerome, Monte & Morris.

=== Second reunion and the Original 7ven ===
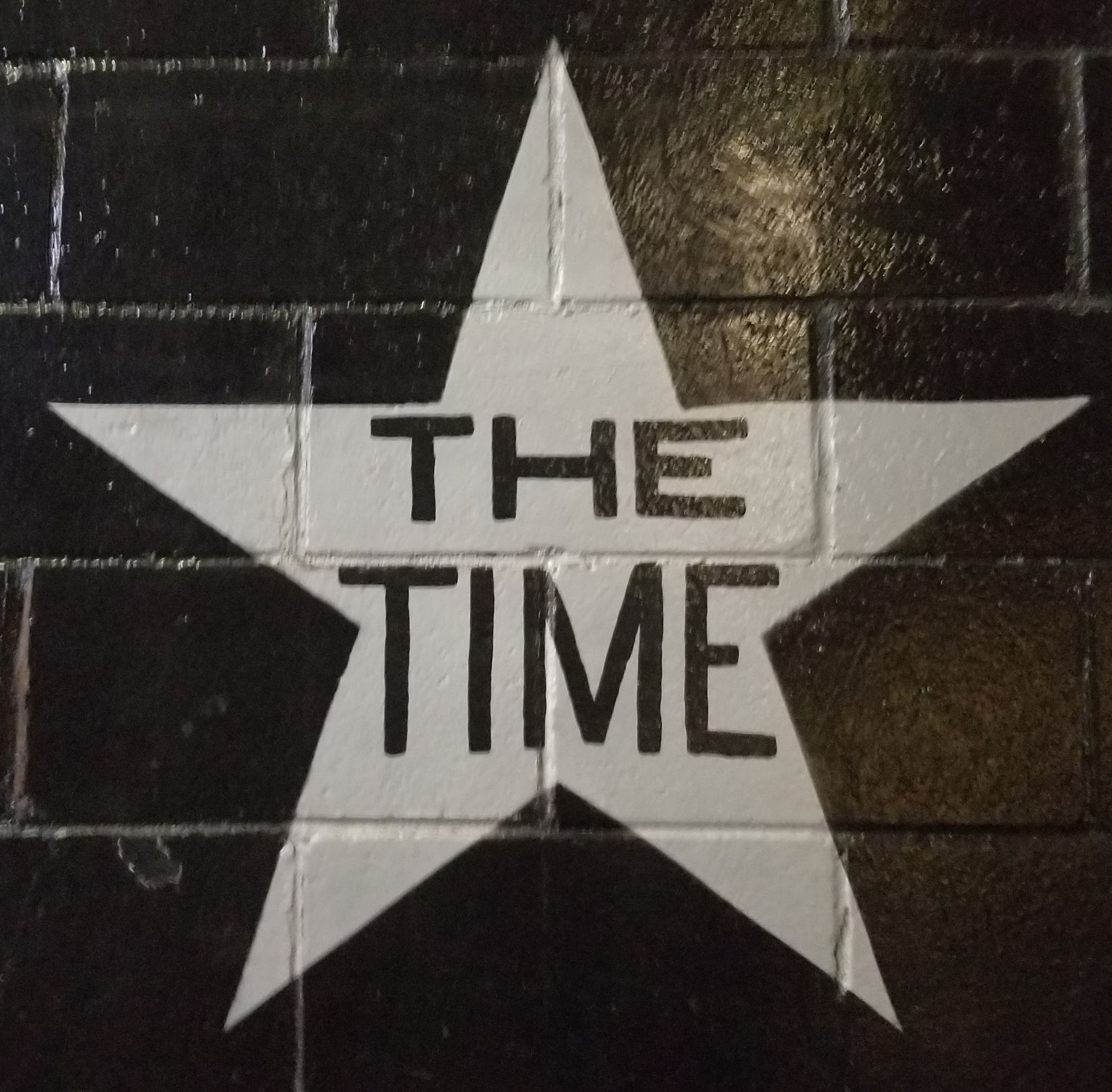
The Time's star on the outside mural of the Minneapolis nightclub First Avenue

The Time reunited at the 50th Grammy Awards on February 10, 2008, performing a medley that included Rihanna and featured "Jungle Love".

In June and July 2008, all of the original members of the Time (Morris Day, Jimmy Jam, Terry Lewis, Jesse Johnson, Jerome Benton, Jellybean Johnson, and Monte Moir) reunited once again for a series of shows at the Flamingo Hotel and Casino in Las Vegas.

A January 2009 interview mentions that guitarist Jesse Johnson states he is working with the Time on their upcoming album. The Time appeared at the Fox Theater, in Detroit, Michigan on June 11, 2010, with the original lineup to a packed house. Two days later during what Jimmy Jam dubbed "The Stingy Tour" on June 13, 2010 the "magnificent 7" played a hometown reunion concert in Minneapolis, MN, and, during that concert, announced on stage that a new album was "90% complete", which confirmed information provided in a Billboard profile published a week earlier.

In September 2011, the band announced a name change to the Original 7ven and a new album Condensate which was released October 18, 2011 with the single "#Trendin" released September 20. Concerning the name change, Jimmy Jam said that “the decision was made at that point that we could either continue to, shall we say, negotiate or argue or plead or whatever. We decided to go the route of 'let’s not hold things up because of the name. Let’s embrace the opportunity to move forward in a new era, with a new outlook, with a new album' and that’s what we did. We think the name reflects exactly who we are. We are the Original 7even and that basically, for me, covers it.”

On October 27, 2011, the Original 7ven appeared on The Tonight Show with Jay Leno.

On November 17, 2011, the Original 7ven opened the Soul Train Music Awards in Atlanta, Georgia. The show was broadcast on November 27.

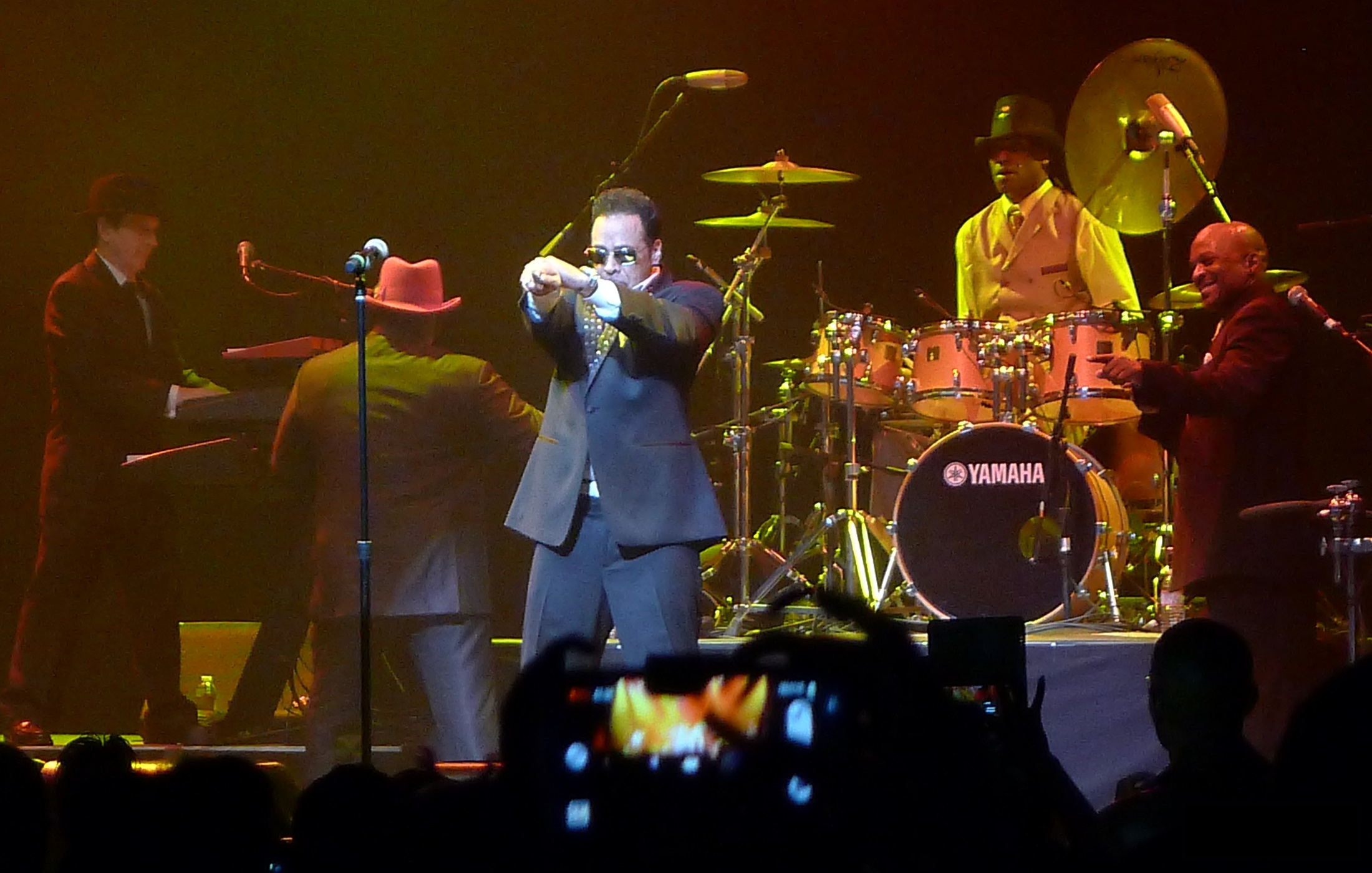
The Original 7ven performing in 2013

On April 21, 2016, group founder Prince was pronounced dead at his Paisley Park complex. Members of the band paid tribute to him in live performances and on social media.

On the weekend of June 24/25, 2016, Morris Day & the Time appeared at a Prince Tribute in London organised by the charity Autism Rocks. The charity was supported by Prince with live shows, including his last in the UK. Alongside Morris and the Time were other artists influenced or otherwise involved with Prince including CeeLo Green, Mark Ronson and Larry Graham & Graham Central Station.

On February 12, 2017, the original lineup of the Time played a brief two-song set at the Grammy Awards in Los Angeles, California, held at Staples Center as part of a tribute to Prince. The Time's appearance was followed by a performance by Bruno Mars.

The band has been honored with a star on the exterior of the Minneapolis nightclub First Avenue, where both the original roster and the second lineup of the group performed (first in October 1981 and later in the film Purple Rain). The stars on the building recognize performers who have played sold-out shows or have otherwise demonstrated a major contribution to the culture at the iconic venue. Receiving a star "might be the most prestigious public honor an artist can receive in Minneapolis," according to journalist Steve Marsh.

Monte Moir would first leave The Time shortly before the filming of Purple Rain. Despite returning to the band in 1990 and then staying for many more years, Moir would again leave The Time in 2019. However, he would briefly unite with The Time for their performance at the 2020 Grammy Award Salute to Prince.

Jellybean Johnson, who had served as the drummer, and also in other roles, for The Time since its foundation, died on November 21, 2025 at the age of 69.

== Legal dispute with Prince Estate ==
In March 2022, a Los Angeles Times article reported that the Prince Estate had recently informed Day that he "can no longer use [the name] Morris Day and the Time in any capacity". Music industry attorney Erin M. Jacobson was quoted in the article saying that it was more accurate to say the letter said that Day could not claim "ownership of the name", but there was still opportunity to use the name via an agreement with the Prince Estate that would provide terms for Day to monetarily compensate "the trademark owner in exchange for the ability to continue using the name".

== Members ==
Current

- Morris Day – lead and backing vocals, drums (1981–1985, 1990–1991, 1995–present)
- Torrell "Tori" Ruffin – guitar, backing vocals (1995–present)
- Ricky "Freeze" Smith – bass, backing vocals (1995–2018, 2020–present)
- Sylvester Donald – valet, dancer, backing vocals, percussion (2007–2015, 2021–present)
- Andre "PaDre" Holmes – keyboards, bass, backing vocals (2018–present)
- Christopher Troy – keyboards, backing vocals (2021–present)
- Joe Cool – drums (2025–present)

Past

- Jellybean Johnson – drums, guitar, backing vocals (1972–1985, 1990–1991, 1995–2025) (his death)
- Jimmie L. Anderson – saxophone (1972–1981)
- David Eiland – saxophone (1972–1981)
- Cynthia Johnson – lead vocals (1972–1979)
- Monte Moir – keyboards, backing vocals (1972–1983, 1990–1991, 1995–2019, 2020)
- Terry Lewis – bass, backing vocals (1972–1983, 1990–1991, 2008, 2011, 2017, 2020)
- Jimmy Jam – keyboards, backing vocals (1972–1983, 1990–1991, 2008, 2011, 2017, 2020)
- Alexander O'Neal – lead vocals (1979–1981)
- Jesse Johnson – guitar, backing vocals (1981–1985, 1990–1991, 2008, 2011, 2017)
- Jerome Benton – valet, dancer, backing vocals, percussion (1981–1985, 1990–1991, 1995–2006, 2008, 2011, 2017, 2020)
- Mark Cardenas – keyboards, backing vocals (1983–1984)
- St. Paul Peterson – keyboards, backing vocals (1983–1984)
- Rocky Harris – bass (1983) (died 2013)
- Jerry Hubbard – bass, backing vocals (1983–1984)
- Morris Hayes – keyboards, backing vocals (1991)
- Stanley "Chance" Howard – keyboards, backing vocals (1995–2003, 2004–2006)
- Robert "GI" Grissett Jr. – keyboards, backing vocals (1995–c. 2001)
- Brice Myles – keyboards, backing vocals (2006)
- Jeff "Jeffree Mak" McNeely – keyboards, backing vocals (2006–2019)
- Thomas Austin – valet, dancer, backing vocals, percussion (2014–2020)
- Charlie Redd – bass, backing vocals (2018)

== Discography ==
The Time discography
- Studio albums: 5
- Singles: 13

=== Studio albums ===
Year	Title	Chart positions		
Year	Title	US	US R&B	UK
1981	The Time: Released: July 29, 1981; Label: Warner Bros.	50	7	—
1982	What Time Is It?: Released: August 25, 1982; Label: Warner Bros.	26	2	—
1984	Ice Cream Castle: Released: July 2, 1984; Label: Warner Bros.	24	3	—
1990	Pandemonium: Released: July 10, 1990; Label: Paisley Park/Reprise/Warner Bros.	18	9	66
2011	Condensate (as The Original 7ven): Released: October 18, 2011; Label: Saguaro Road	58	10	—
"—" denotes releases that did not chart or were not released in that territory.

=== Singles ===
Year	Title	Chart positions			Album
Year	Title	US Hot 100	US R&B	US Dance	Album
1981	"Get It Up"	—	6	16	The Time
1981	"Cool"	90	7	16	The Time
1982	"Girl"	—	49	—	The Time
1982	"777-9311"	88	2	42	What Time Is It?
1982	"The Walk"	104	24	42	What Time Is It?
1983	"Gigolos Get Lonely Too"	—	77	—	What Time Is It?
1984	"Jungle Love"	20	6	9	Ice Cream Castle
1984	"Ice Cream Castles"	106	11	70	Ice Cream Castle
1984	"The Bird"	36	33	6	Ice Cream Castle
1990	"Jerk Out"	9	1	6	Pandemonium
1990	"Chocolate"	—	44	—	Pandemonium
1991	"Shake!"	—	—	—	Graffiti Bridge
2011	"#Trendin"	—	77	—	Condensate
"—" denotes releases that did not chart or were not released in that territory.
