= Jesse Johnson (musician) =

American musician (born 1960)

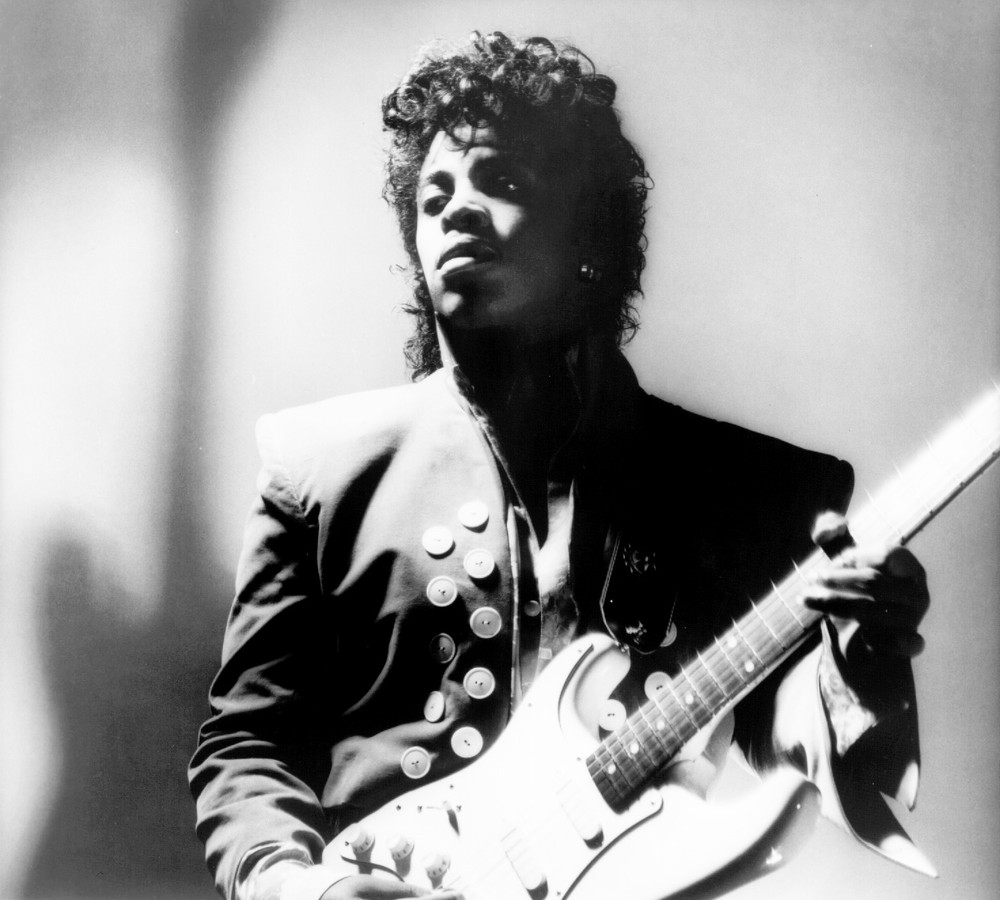
- Johnson in 1988

Background information
- Born: Jesse Woods Johnson; June 1, 1960 (age 66); Rock Island, Illinois, United States
- Genres: Funk, funk rock, soul, R&B
- Occupations: Musician, composer
- Instrument: Guitar
- Years active: 1981–present
- Labels: Warner Bros. A&M

Jesse Woods Johnson (born June 1, 1960) is an American funk musician best known as the guitarist in the original 1981 lineup of The Time (known since 2011 as Original 7ven).

== Life and career ==
Johnson was born in Rock Island, Illinois. He moved to East St. Louis, Illinois, at the age of nine and was raised by foster parents after his parents split up. At the age of 16, he moved back to Rock Island to live with his father Jackwood Johnson.

Johnson began playing guitar when he was 15, honing his chops in local rock bands such as Treacherous Funk, Pilot, and Dealer, throughout his teens and early twenties. On the recommendation of fellow Musician, Robbie Muskeyvalley (of the band "Midnight Express", he moved in 1981 to Minneapolis, Minnesota, where he met Morris Day and played briefly in Day's band, which was called Enterprise. He then became the lead guitarist for The Time, a funk rock group formed by Prince.

Although Prince basically wrote and recorded the first two Time albums on his own with input from Morris Day, Johnson did contribute to another Prince project, Vanity 6, with a song called "Bite the Beat" co-written with Prince. On The Time's third album, Ice Cream Castle, Johnson contributed to the hit singles "The Bird" and "Jungle Love", which were helped by the popularity of the Purple Rain film.

However, at the height of The Time's popularity following Purple Rain, following the departure of Morris Day, Johnson left the band and with the help of Manager Owen Husney signed a solo deal with A&M Records in 1984, and the following year released Jesse Johnson's Revue. This album featured two other former members of The Time in Johnson's backing band, keyboardist Mark Cardenas and bassist Jerry Hubbard. Three songs were released from the album: "Be Your Man", "Can You Help Me" and "I Want My Girl", a slow song about a fateful relationship. Then came the funk non-album outing "Free World". In 1986, Johnson's second album, Shockadelica, was released – containing the hit single "Crazay", a duet with Sly Stone – and his third album Every Shade of Love followed in 1988. Throughout the late 1980s and early 1990s, Johnson also featured on the soundtracks to the Breakfast Club (contributing "Heart Too Hot to Hold", a duet with Stephanie Spruill), Pretty in Pink, Another 48 Hrs. and White Men Can't Jump.

Johnson has produced a wide variety of artists, most notably Janet Jackson, Paula Abdul, TaMara and the Seen, After 7, Da Krash, Kool Skool, Debbie Allen, Cheryl Lynn, and Les Rita Mitsouko.

By 1990, The Time reformed and issued Pandemonium, which was more of a group effort than their former albums. The album allowed Johnson to contribute his hard rock guitar sound to several tracks.

After the band dissolved once again, Johnson remained in the background for several years, quietly contributing to soundtracks and other artists. His music he recorded for the film A Time to Kill was not released on the soundtrack but can be heard in the film. Finally, in 1996, Johnson released another album, Bare My Naked Soul on the Dinosaur Entertainment label. The album was a departure from his funk-filled albums from the 1980s and instead verged into blues and hard rock.

Four years later, the highlights of Johnson's solo albums were collected on his Ultimate Collection, which album includes B-sides, 12" versions, album tracks, and one previously unreleased song called "Vibe".

After a nearly 14-year absence from the music scene, in 2009 Johnson released a new double album Verbal Penetration, about which Casey Rain wrote: "This can definitely be considered Jesse's magnum opus. It's an absolute tour de force of style and songwriting, from the funk grooves like '100 Watts of Funky', the blistering rock of tracks like the title track, and even spoken-word thoughts from Jesse." In 2010, Johnson was featured on the album Blues In My Sunshine, by Sue Ann Carwell (who had also been a vocal contributor to Verbal Penetration).

In February 2012, Johnson served as house guitarist behind a host of all-star blues musicians in the PBS special In Performance at the White House: Red, White and Blues. Other members of the house band included Booker T. Jones, Bobby Ross Avila, Narada Michael Walden, Ernie Fields, Jr., Freddie Hendrix and Fred Wesley. Performers included B.B. King, Buddy Guy, Mick Jagger, Jeff Beck, Warren Haynes, Derek Trucks, Susan Tedeschi, Keb Mo, Trombone Shorty and Gary Clark, Jr.

== Solo discography ==
=== Studio albums ===
Year	Album details	Chart positions		Certifications (sales thresholds)
Year	Album details	US	US R&B	Certifications (sales thresholds)
1985	Jesse Johnson's Revue: Labels: A&M Records	43	8	700,000 (Worldwide Sales)
1986	Shockadelica: Labels: A&M Records	70	15	1,000,000 (Worldwide Sales)
1988	Every Shade of Love: Labels: A&M Records	79	26	500,000 (Worldwide Sales)
1996	Bare My Naked Soul: Labels: Dinosaur Entertainment Corporation	—	—	
2009	Verbal Penetration: Labels: Bellavenix Music	—	—	
"—" denotes releases that did not chart.

=== Compilation albums ===
- Ultimate Collection (2000, Hip-O Records)

=== Singles ===
Year	Title	Chart positions				
Year	Title	US Hot 100	US R&B	US Club Play	NZ	UK
1985	"Be Your Man"	61	4	20	—	—
1985	"Can You Help Me"	—	3	12	—	—
1985	"I Want My Girl"	76	7	—	—	—
1985	"Let's Have Some Fun"	—	87	—	—	—
1986	"Crazay" (featuring Sly Stone)	53	2	12	22	—
1986	"She (I Can't Resist)"	—	28	18	—	95
1987	"Baby Let's Kiss"	—	23	—	—	—
1987	"Black in America"	—	—	—	—	—
1987	"Free World"	—	—	—	—	—
1988	"Love Struck"	78	4	13	25	76
1988	"Every Shade of Love"	—	19	—	—	98
1988	"I'm Just Wanting You" (promo single)	—	—	—	—	—
1996	"My Life"	—	—	—	—	—
"—" denotes releases that did not chart.

== As producer ==
- TaMara and the Seen (1985)
- Da Krash
- Kool Skool (1989)
- After 7 (1991)
