= Dez Dickerson =

American guitarist and singer

- Born: Desmond D'andrea Dickerson; August 7, 1955 (age 71); Minneapolis, Minnesota, U.S.
- Genres: Funk rock, pop rock, R&B
- Occupations: Guitarist, musician
- Instruments: Guitar, vocals
- Years active: 1974–present
- Formerly of: The Revolution
- Website: www.dezdickerson.com

Desmond D'andrea Dickerson (born August 7, 1955) is an American guitarist and singer who was a member of Prince's band the Revolution.

== Life and career ==
Dickerson was born in 1955 as Desmond D'andrea Dickerson, in Minneapolis, Minnesota. A veteran of numerous Minneapolis rock bands, Dickerson answered Prince's call for a touring musician in the Twin Cities Reader, a local entertainment paper, in 1979. After a 15-minute audition in the back of Del's Tire Mart, Dickerson was picked as guitarist. In 1980 when off the road for Christmas break, Dickerson had a profound conversion experience and became a born-again Christian. Afterwards, performing songs with sexual themes began to trouble his conscience. Even though Dickerson's and Prince's popularity were growing, he desired more and more to quit the band. He contributed songs for Prince's side projects, writing "He's So Dull" for Vanity 6, and co-writing "Wild and Loose", "After Hi School", and "Cool" for the Time. Dickerson contributed vocals to "Little Red Corvette" and "1999" on the 1999 album, as well as the guitar solo for "Little Red Corvette" that ranked number 64 on Guitar World's list of the 100 Greatest Guitar Solos.

Following the 1999 tour, Dickerson left the band to pursue other options. He was replaced by Wendy Melvoin.

After leaving the Revolution, Dickerson formed his own short-lived band, the Modernaires, and toured in support of Billy Idol on his 1984 Rebel Yell tour, frequently joining Idol onstage. Dickerson appeared in the movie Purple Rain with the Modernaires, but their song was not released as a single nor on the Purple Rain soundtrack. A solo recording deal failed to materialize, and in 1987 Dickerson relocated to Nashville to back singer Judson Spence. He also kept busy with session work and producing other artists.

In 1990, Dickerson was named vice president of A&R with the CCM (Contemporary Christian music) label Starsong Communications. Four years later he founded his own label, Absolute Records, a Christian rock record company. Artists on his label included Squirt, These 5 Down and Metropolis a.k.a. Metropolis America. He released a solo album in the late 1990s entitled Oneman, and then a book, My Time with Prince: Confessions of a Former Revolutionary, which spans from his audition in 1978 until leaving Prince in 1983.

In 2005, Dickerson released a double CD retrospective collection of his work from 1982 to 1987, including the complete version of the "classic" Modernaire. Taken from the film Purple Rain and featuring Prince on guitars, keyboards and backing vocals, this track was released on vinyl in 2008 by the UK label Citinite.

Also in 2005, a three-CD set was released, titled Rock of Ages – Where Classic Hymns Meet Classic Rock! This set was produced, arranged, recorded, and mixed by Dickerson and features powerful guitar riffs. It presented 32 well-known hymns in a rock format, with Dickerson playing many of the instruments. Joining Dickerson on this project was his son, Jordan Dickerson, who contributed drums to many of the tracks and bass guitar on some. Jordan also arranged "Agnus Dei".

Currently, Dickerson manages the record label and branding companies Pavilion Entertainment and Pavilion Synergies in Nashville. In 2012, he joined his former bandmates at a full-scale Revolution reunion that was set up by drummer Robert "Bobby Z." Rivkin to raise money and awareness for heart disease; Prince attended the performances but did not participate.

Starting in 2023, Dez, periodically, began filling in for different hosts at Super Talk 99.7 WTN in Nashville, TN.

== Discography ==
=== Albums ===
- Oneman (1999), Absolute
- Rock of Ages – Where Classic Hymns Meet Classic Rock! (2005), Madacy
- A Retrospective 1982–1987 (2006)

=== Singles ===
- "Modernaire" (2008), Citinite
