= Creep (TLC song) =

1994 single by TLC

Single by TLC

from the album CrazySexyCool
- Released: October 31, 1994
- Recorded: 1993–1994
- Studio: DARP (Atlanta, Georgia)
- Genre: R&B
- Length: 4:29
- Label: LaFace; Arista
- Songwriter: Dallas Austin
- Producer: Dallas Austin

TLC singles chronology
"Get It Up" (1993)	"Creep" (1994)	"Red Light Special" (1995)

Alternative cover
- 1996 cover for European releases and re-issues

Music video
- "Creep" on YouTube

"Creep" is a song recorded by American singing group TLC for their second studio album, CrazySexyCool (1994). Dallas Austin, who tried to write the track from a "female perspective", wrote and produced it. It is based on member Tionne "T-Boz" Watkins's experience with infidelity. The lyrics portray the singers as women who cheat on their unfaithful lovers for "some affection". This context was controversial within the group, and strongly opposed by member Lisa "Left Eye" Lopes, who threatened to wear black tape over her mouth on its accompanying music video.

LaFace and Arista Records released the song as the album's lead single on October 31, 1994, and it gained both critical acclaim and commercial success. Music critics praised Austin's work and TLC's new musical direction, and commercially "Creep" became the group's first number one on the United States Billboard Hot 100. It topped the chart for four consecutive weeks and was later certified platinum in sales. Following its European debut/re-issue in early 1996, the song reached the top ten in the United Kingdom and New Zealand and the top forty in other countries. Included in the remixes was a new rap verse written by Lopes which warns listeners of safe sex issues. "Creep" appeared on many best-of lists and received a Grammy Award for Best R&B Performance by a Duo or Group with Vocals.

The trio contacted Matthew Rolston to film a music video after seeing his work for Salt-N-Pepa. The resulting video was later deemed one of the most iconic pop videos of all time, notably for the famous satin pajamas costumes and the choreography. With changes in both musical style and image, the song marked a major reinvention in TLC's career. They performed it during several live concerts and television events, and the track being used in films and TV series, and covered and sampled by artists including American rock band The Afghan Whigs and singer Zendaya.

== Development and lyrical content ==
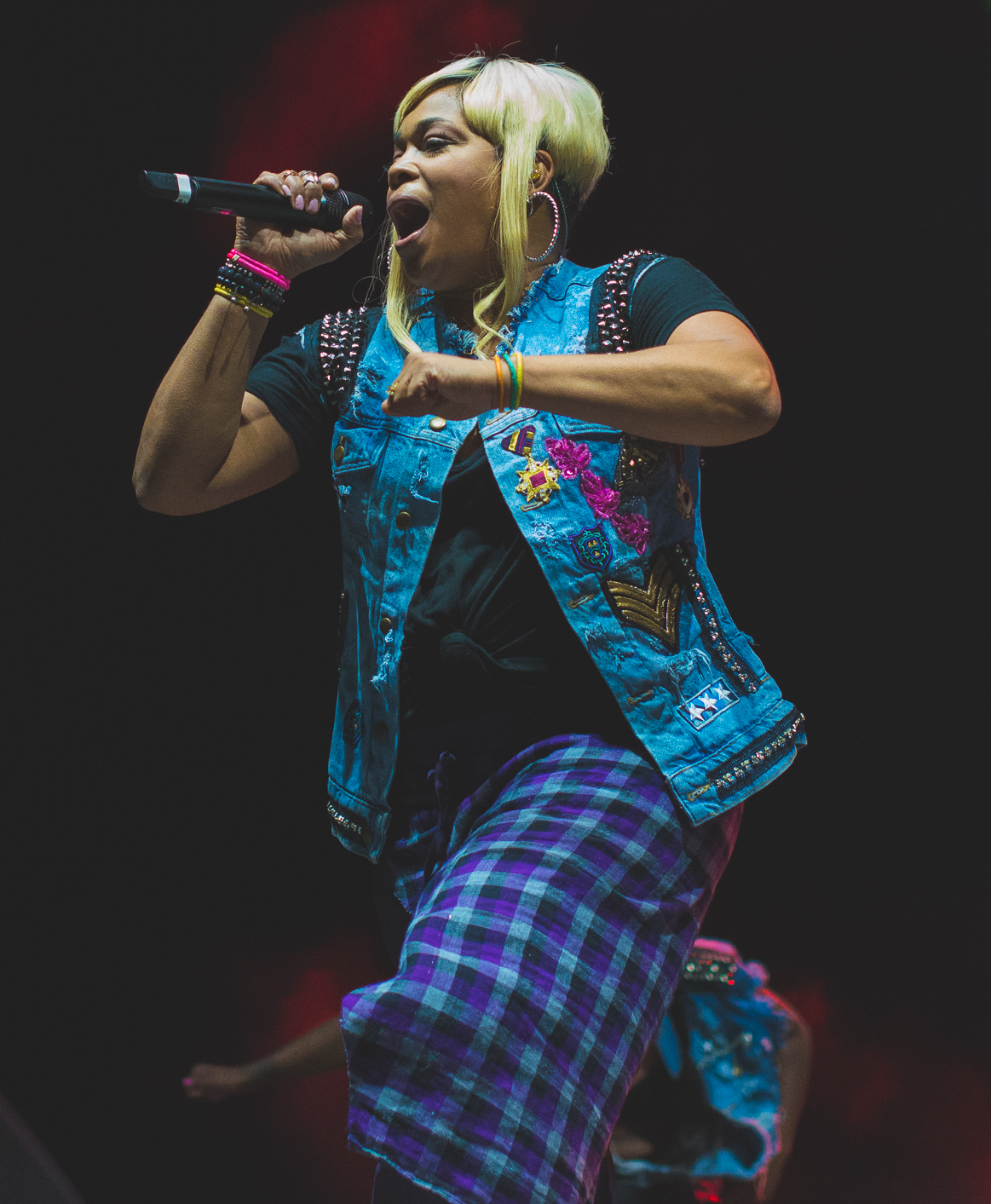
"Creep" is based on member Tionne "T-Boz" Watkins' experience with a former boyfriend.

After releasing their successful debut album Ooooooohhh... On the TLC Tip (1992), TLC began working on their second release called CrazySexyCool in 1993, and continued to work on the project through September 1994. One of the album's tracks, "Creep", was based on member Tionne "T-Boz" Watkins' experience. She recalled it for Billboard:

You're with a guy and he's not showing you attention, so another guy comes along and you're like, "Hey, if you were where you were supposed to be, he couldn't be showing me attention right now!" I was in the middle of this drama, because the other guy was [my boyfriend's] friend, and my boyfriend was just not getting it together.

Watkins shared this with the group's long-time writer-producer Dallas Austin. She had known him, and they had shared stories since they were teenagers. "We thought that was a good relationship to talk about because a lot of people don't admit that's how they feel – that their man's playing on them and they want to be with him so they seek attention elsewhere, but they really want to be with their guy", she added.

Austin wrote "Creep" from a female perspective, and thought Watkins would be its perfect lead singer. This was a new songwriting experience for him, as he was "talking about stuff guys didn't know girls did". The "female point-of-view" on the track was something the trio appreciated because as a group they portrayed themselves as feminists, and the song reflects that perspective. On the 2013 VH1 biopic CrazySexyCool: The TLC Story, however, the track also appeared to have been inspired by Austin's infidelity to then-girlfriend, member Rozonda "Chilli" Thomas.

Latoya Peterson of Spin observed that feminism was being loudly maligned in music at the time of the song's release, and as a result more female artists like TLC, Salt-N-Pepa and Tori Amos began to "overtly defend themselves". The group denied being inspired by Radiohead's 1992 track with the same name. Andy Greene of Rolling Stone pointed out that the group took the term "creep" in a different direction from Radiohead's track or Stone Temple Pilots' 1993 single, because TLC's song is about getting revenge on a cheating guy by having an affair. The idea, however, was considered quite "controversial". According to Thomas, the theme did not come as much of a shock for them:

I think when we first came out, it was very bold of us to have a song called "Ain't 2 Proud 2 Beg" with [the lyrics] "Two inches or a yard, rock hard or if it's sagging". People totally understood what type of group we were. To sing a song like "Creep" wouldn't be surprising from us.

Despite this, member Lisa "Left Eye" Lopes was opposed to it. She threatened to wear black tape over her mouth in the song's music video to express her disagreement with its message, and its selection as CrazySexyCool's lead single, and in part because of the group's history of advocating for safe sex. "I was like 'If a girl is gonna [sic] catch her man cheating,' this was my thing, 'instead of telling her to cheat back, why don't we tell her [to] just leave?'" Watkins stated that Lopes was especially worried that her then-boyfriend, Andre Rison, might get the wrong idea, even though the song was not based on their relationship.

In the end, Lopes capitulated, saying: "If some people can creep, and in their minds, they can feel better by going out doing the same thing... Fine. I'm just not one of those people." The rapper later added a new rap verse on remixed versions of the song, which talks about the consequences of cheating. Watkins stated that Lopes initially intended for the rap to be included in the original version of the song, but Watkins and Austin disagreed with the rap and opted to have it removed.

Thomas thought the song and the video's choreography routine were "cool" enough to distract people from its lyrical content and "just sing along".

Even the song "Creep" – not that we creep, but if we did, [It was a song] for a woman that would do such a thing. I say just leave his ass, but if you're not ready to just jet at the moment, then you know, I guess we told you how to [creep]. We were really happy and we still are really happy to be the voice for so many women in so many different situations in their lives

— Thomas on Myspace in 2014.

Jon Parales of The New York Times stood by the song's concept: "The women sing about infidelity, revenge, status and power plays, not as victims but as contenders; when they're cheated on, they cheat, too." The Guardian's Carol Cooper described the track as reflecting the darker side of TLC's "giddy hedonism".

== Musical style and composition ==
"Creep"
A sample of the song's chorus, where Watkins's vocals are laid over an "infectious" groove, comprising a heavy hip hop beat, a trumpet sample and scratching sounds.

"Creep" is a R&B song influenced by funk, jazz, soul and boom bap; a distinctive sound for the trio whose earlier works had a new jack swing sound. The A.V. Club's David Anthony pointed out that the mid-1990s R&B "renaissance" in music, and Lopes's stint in rehab, re-invented TLC's musical direction and brought a stronger focus on pop elements to CrazySexyCool. Similar to their past works, "Creep" includes hip hop samples—particularly two 1989 singles, Slick Rick's "Hey Young World" and Shinehead's "Who the Cap Fits"—a heavy beat, with "forthright sex talk" lyrics with a kind of "playful sensuality" and "street aggression". According to The Telegraph, the group delivered it with an "empowered" attitude with Prince-style eroticism. Its production was built on a "deep" and "infectious" groove, around a wafting "late night"-style trumpet sample with quietly "jiggling" funk guitar and scratching sounds—all adding depth to the subversively "poppy" vocal chorus and accentuating the song's "slinky" hooks. Michael Arceneaux of Complex called the track a "darker, mellower, and far jazzier" sound than any of its predecessors, which was "perfect" for Watkins's alto voice.

Musically, "Creep" is set in the time signature of common time with a moderate tempo of 96 beats per minute. It was composed in the traditional verse–chorus form in C minor with Watkins and Thomas's vocals ranging from the chords of C_{4} to F_{5}. "Yes, it's me again/And I'm back", Watkins introduces herself while opening the track in a "husky" voice. She then repeats the lines "oh-I, oh-I, oh-I", which was compared by Spin's Terry Sutton to Watkins finding "a spiritual instruction in vowel sounds" before starting the song's first verse. In the first verse, the singer counts her relationship's "twenty-second [sic] of loneliness" and expresses how she still loves her boyfriend while acknowledging that he has cheated on her. Moving on to the song's bridge, she suddenly uses a lower register to "nonchalantly" reveal: "I'll never leave him down, though I might mess around/It's only cause I need some affection." "So I creep/Yeah/And I'll just keep it on the down low." She lowers the key and sings the hook as if she is "confessing to a chosen few."

Opening the second verse, Watkins again counts her "twenty-third of loneliness" and still talks of her love for her partner despite signs of a broken romance. After repeating the chorus, Watkins "sweetly" explains the reason that she is cheating: she needs some attention from her lover. She ends the track with the lines "I creep around because I need attention/I don't mess around with my affection" while fading out with the heavy beat and the horn sample. Billboard's Larry Flick said that Watkins's vocals were "tightly woven" and "rife with raspy grit", which provided a nice contrast to the song's horn sample and funk guitars.

== Release and remixes ==
Watkins recalled that LaFace Records' co-founder Antonio "L.A." Reid "flipped out" when he first heard "Creep" and the track became CrazySexyCool's first single on October 31, 1994, despite Lopes's disagreement with the choice. Many producers contributed their remixes to the song's release, including Austin and his "DARP Mix". Jermaine Dupri—who was working closely with TLC and had expressed his admiration for the song—collaborated with Shannon Houchins to create "Jermaine's Jeep Mix". Austin's and Untouchables' mixes featured a newly-written rap verse by Lopes, with a noteworthy lyric which warns: "Prenatal HIV is often sleeping in a creeping cradle." Nate Jones from People wrote of the Lopes lyric, saying it was another reminder of the trio's commitment to address social issues in their music.

In the United Kingdom, the single was originally released on January 9, 1995. The following year, in the UK and some European countries, it was re-issued or debuted as "Creep '96" on January 13, 1996, composed of mixes by Dupri, Maxx, Tin Tin Out, and a single-edit of "Waterfalls" (replaced by its "DARP Mix" on the vinyl version). In Japan, a mini-CD single was issued on December 16, 1994. Internationally, "Creep" appeared on most TLC compilations over the years, notably Now & Forever: The Hits (2003), The Very Best of TLC: Crazy Sexy Hits (2006) and 20 (2013). For the 2013 Japanese compilation TLC 20: 20th Anniversary Hits, Watkins and Thomas re-recorded "Creep", and a few other tracks, to celebrate the group's twenty years in the music industry.

== Critical reception ==
"Creep" received widespread critical acclaim. Music critic Robert Christgau, AllMusic's Stephen Thomas Erlewine and Time magazine each declared the track one of CrazySexyCool's best. Steve Baltin from Cash Box noted, "Infused with a slight bit of drama in the intro, 'Creep' just slinks through the airwaves, slithering into listeners’ minds where it wraps itself tightly, thanks to its low vocals and enticing backbeat. A monster hit." "In many ways, TLC at least musically, were best when they were the most subtle", commented Complex's Michael Arceneaux, who found the track's content "refreshing" for displaying women who "muddy up right and wrong in a relationship". From the same publication, Benjamin Chesna and Edwin Ortiz credited the song with making infidelity sound "empowering" while praising Austin's "silky smooth production", adding: "[Watkins] forced you into the arms of another lady, now you just have to keep it on the down low". Simon Price from Melody Maker felt it "have hooks you could hang your coat on". Another Melody Maker editor, Andrew Mueller, named it Single of the Week. Ralph Tee from Music Week's RM Dance Update said, "It's not the anthem that 'Ain't Too Proud To Beg' was, but is still a quality mid-pacer with catchy tooting trumpet riff, scratch and static effects and cool laid-back vocals." Pan-European magazine Music & Media wrote, "Don't pass by such new jill swing of the highest calibre." Slant Magazine's editor Sal Cinquemani was reviewing the greatest-hits album 20 when he observed that both girls' "finest" singles, 'Creep' and 'Ain't 2 Proud 2 Beg', had them "proudly flipping accepted modes of female sexual behavior and consent on their heads". Idolator's journalist Robbie Daw explained the song's "staying power" was because it is a "provocative" track that dared to expose the "taboo, down-low" aspects of a relationship.

In contrast, one of Pitchfork's contributors, Jess Harvell, felt its lyrics were "unconscionable", but praised the song's groove for being "so seductive you barely register what you're singing along to". Harvell continued to say that Austin even managed to make scratching, "that emblem of noisy hip-hop ruckus", sound "smooth".

In Charles Aaron's review for Spin, he used a short story:

A young woman was walking through downtown Brooklyn the other day when a man approached her and asked mock-politely, "Excuse me, do you know where I can get some pussy around here?" She stared, rolled her eyes, and kept walking, but he kept insisting, "Well, do you?" Finally, she turned, and replied wryly, "Yeah, at your mother's house." That's TLC, whether [Lopes] is brat-a-tat-tatting with her brash raps or whether [Thomas] is kickin' [sic] it butter-slick on this infectious cheatin' [sic] song, written and so smoothly produced by Dallas Austin.

Aaron went on say the track marked a "commercial/artistic apex" for Austin's career.

Including it on her list of best tracks that make people dance, Bernadette McNulty of The Telegraph claimed: "The Dallas Austin groove on this is so deep, it might give you vertigo." Ebony's writer Michael A. Gonzales agreed that the song "put the sonic scientist that much closer to [Austin's] dreams of making tracks as enticing and sexy as the ones his hero Prince created for Vanity 6 and Apollonia 6". Music critic Smokey Fontaine called the track Austin's best work: "Here, the harmonies worked, the bass line was hard enough to compete in a hip-hop world, and for a moment, R&B didn't need a guest rapper."

=== Accolades ===
In 1995, "Creep" was nominated for three categories at the first Soul Train Lady of Soul Awards: Best R&B/Soul Single by a Group, Band or Duo; R&B/Soul Song of the Year; and R&B/Soul Music Video of the Year. It won the first of these awards. Also, in the same year, the song got TLC two nominations for the Billboard Music Awards for Top R&B Song, winning the latter, and Single of the Year. The song received two nominations at the 38th Grammy Awards, for Best R&B Song and Best R&B Performance by a Duo or Group with Vocals, winning the latter. "We were in shock! We just put out music so that people could find a connection with what were saying, so we didn't know exactly how people would feel about anything", Thomas said of TLC's winning moment. "So when you get that kind of recognition, it says so much. The Grammys is like the Oscars of music, so we were just beyond happy to get one." Shortly after winning, they announced they were bankrupt in a backstage interview. The song's publisher, EMI, later received the 1996 ASCAP Pop Music Award for Publisher of the Year.

== Commercial performance ==
Two weeks after its release, "Creep" debuted at number 71 on the US Billboard Hot 100 chart of November 12, 1994. The following week, it jumped to number 25, then climbed to the top ten at number 8 on December 3. Within a month of its release the single received a gold certification from the Recording Industry Association of America (RIAA) for shipment of 500,000 copies. Combined with 100,000 sold in the following month, it became the 23rd best-selling single of 1994, according to Billboard. Soon after it became their third platinum single, it topped the Hot R&B/Hip-Hop Songs and Rhythmic charts, and peaked at number three on the Radio Songs chart and number nine on the Mainstream Top 40.

After more than a month in the top ten, "Creep" reached the number one position on January 28, 1995, and became TLC's first number-one hit in the US. "Creep" held the number-one position for four consecutive weeks before it was overtaken by Madonna's single "Take a Bow". The song placed at number three on Hot 100's year-end chart with 800,000 copies sold in 1995, making it the 18th best-selling single that year. Due to the song's commercial success, it won a Billboard Music Award for Top R&B Song and was nominated for the Top Hot 100 Song category in 1995. Retrospectively, "Creep" was listed at number 21 on Billboard Hot 100's decade-end list of the 1990s, and became the fourth-most-successful song on the chart by a girl group.

In the United Kingdom, "Creep" peaked at number 22 on the UK Singles Chart and at number four on the R&B Chart. It reached the number four spot in New Zealand, becoming TLC's highest listed single in the country at the time. It went on to receive a platinum certification from Recorded Music NZ (RMNZ) with 15,000 equivalent units, and peaked at number 35 on their year-end chart. In other territories, "Creep" moved into the top-twenty in the Netherlands and Australia, while reaching the top-forty in France, Switzerland and Germany. The song appeared on Canada's RPM magazine's Top Singles top-forty, year-end dance chart at number 35. It also charted in Belgium, Sweden and the European Hot 100 Singles.

After its January 1996 re-issue as "Creep '96", it re-entered the UK Singles Chart at number 6, where it remained for seven weeks; it also peaked at number three on the R&B chart. The re-issue also helped the song surpass its original 1995 peak on the Scotland singles chart from number 44 to number 17. In Sweden the record peaked at number 56.

== Legacy ==
The song was described by many publications as a "masterpiece" and a "classic", and became one of the group's signature hits. Almost a decade after its debut, Mimi Valdés of Vibe said that the song lifted their "girl power movement" to new heights, with its female-empowerment theme inspiring works by many artists at the time, including Aaliyah, Missy Elliott and Destiny's Child. The term "creep" still appears in rap music. As with many TLC songs, "Creep" positioned women as the gazers and men as their objects. Mickey Hess wrote in his book Icons of Hip Hop: An Encyclopedia of the Movement, Music, and Culture, Volume 2, "TLC celebrates women and encourages them to love men and demand respect from their men and from themselves."

"Creep" appeared on The Village Voice's 1995 Pazz & Jop critics' poll at number eight along with "Waterfalls" at number five. Bruce Pollock listed the song in his book Rock Song Index: The 7500 Most Important Songs for the Rock and Roll Era (2005) for "establish[ing] the sound of chick hop". It also appeared on several best decade-end lists: Spin placed it in the third spot on its top twenty, The Boston Phoenix listed it among ninety other best tracks, music journalist Smokey Fontaine placed it at number eight on his top ten, and Pitchfork listed it at number 114 on its top 200 best tracks list. Both Complex and The Guardian chose "Creep" as the second-best R&B song of the 1990s, with the latter's Charlotte Richardson Andrews calling the song "90s R&B at its most thrilling". In 2017, Billboard named it the second-greatest girl-group song of all time. The Guardian and Paste both ranked the song number three on their lists of the greatest TLC songs.

List of accolades for "Creep"

Year	Publication	Accolade	Rank	Ref.
1995	The Village Voice	Pazz & Jop critics' poll	8	
1999	Spin	"Top 20 Singles of 1990s"	3	
1999	The Boston Phoenix	"90 Best Songs of the 90s"	–	
2002	Smokey Fontaine	"The Best Singles of 1990s"	8	
2005	Bruce Pollock	Rock Song Index: The 7500 Most Important Songs for the Rock and Roll Era	–	
2010	Pitchfork	"The Top 200 Tracks of the 1990s"	114	
2014	The Guardian	"10 of the best: 90s R&B"	2	
2014	Complex	"The 50 Best R&B Songs of the '90s"	2	
2014	Idolator	"The 50 Best Pop Singles Of 1994"	2	
2017	Billboard	"100 Greatest Girl Group Songs of All Time: Critics' Picks"	2	

== Music video ==
=== Background and development ===
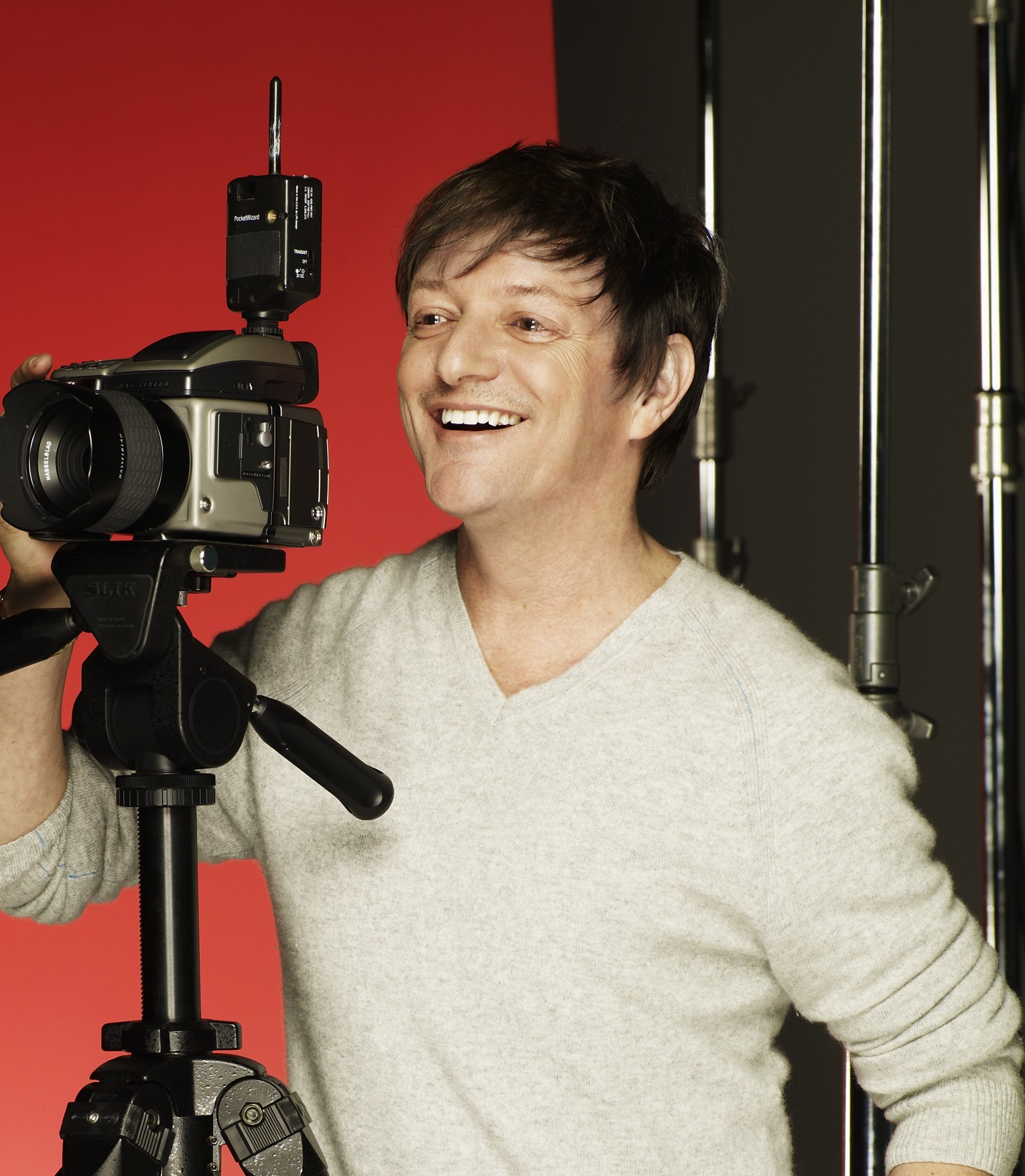
TLC immediately recruited director Matthew Rolston after seeing his work for Salt-N-Pepa and "fell in love" with his filming style.

In June 1994, TLC shot the first video for "Creep" in their hometown, Atlanta, but were dissatisfied with the result. Thomas later said "It didn't feel like we had evolved." The following month, they filmed a second version in Los Angeles with Lionel C. Martin, the director of most of their early videos. L.A. Reid and the trio decided to scrap both versions which did not show their growth as women, and had "grimy" images with bad lighting. The first also lacked sufficient footage for the song's length. Martin's version was later released in early 2013. The "blue-tinged" clip shows the girls sneaking away from their unsuspecting boyfriends to cheat, while other scenes show them performing in front of trucks and cars. Nevertheless, Fact magazine noticed the song's infidelity theme was loosely followed in the clip's narrative, while Priya Elan from NME felt the clip might have been "too urban" for MTV. "Not only is this 'Creep' more genre specific, it also feels more dated", Elan added.

Expecting to show a new and more-mature side visually, TLC were in Los Angeles discussing the project when they saw a Matthew Rolston-directed music video for Salt-N-Pepa. Thomas said, "We were looking at it and said, 'Whoever did this video has to do the "Creep" video.' We fell in love with the way it was shot." She said several times the video they had watched was "Whatta Man", however, during an interview with MTV in 1995, the show said it was "None of Your Business", a video also shot by Rolston that has more visual similarities to the final "Creep" video. Lopes recalled how adamant they were about redoing the video as they were returning to the music scene. When their management suggested having the video re-edited, the group declined and reached out to Rolston to schedule an August 1994 shoot in Los Angeles.

Rolston brought his team including make-up artist, wardrobe-hair stylist, dancers and choreographer, but had a few creative conflicts with the group. One involved the original routine created by Watkins, who had choreographed most of the group's early videos. She remembered Rolston's choreographer, Frank Gatson Jr., "locked" the girls out from providing ideas as they were practicing the new dance moves. The trio eventually dropped Gatson because they thought his version was not their "style of dancing", though two of his moves were adapted in the final clip. "To me, I didn't even think about, 'Well, can I really choreograph?' I was just like, 'Let me do my thing.' I just like to dance and I know when I like what I see. I like different kinds of stuff", Watkins stated. The "bend-down-and-jump-up" dance that appeared in the video was created by Watkins to "Foe Life", a song by rapper Mack 10, her spouse from 2000 to 2004.

Another dispute between TLC and Rolston was over their wardrobe. The director was interested in "tight and sexy" lingerie looks for them while they only liked baggy tomboy clothes. Combining the two, the girls ended up in bright colored, flowing silk pajamas "that took on an edge when all but one button was unbuttoned and wind machines were turned on high." Each custom-made outfit cost more than US$1,000. Thomas also talked about their exhaustion on the set: "People don't realize that for video shoots you have to wake up at like 5 in the morning for your call time. So when we did that part at the very end of the video where we're talking to the camera and looking all silly, we were so tired. But sometimes that ends up being your best shots." Eventually, she called Rolston's final product "excellent", while Lopes said that after two failed attempts the director finally gave them a "real video".

=== Release and synopsis ===
Watkins performing in the video wearing her famous, barely buttoned and wind-blown satin pajamas

The clip debuted on MTV in the last week of October 1994. It opens with each girl, wearing different colored, barely buttoned and wind-blown satin pajamas, singing and dancing individually in front of a distinct brightly colored background. Watkins wears blue in front of a pink background, Lopes—red with a blue background, and Thomas—pink with a red background. In other scenes Thomas's colors have been color corrected to grey for artistic reasons. Added to these takes are a few close-up shots of a twirling blue trumpet. The trio and their accompanying female dancers are later shown in black-and-white shots, practicing the choreography and making fun of Lopes for trying to breakdance while walking on her hands. Thomas described the scene as "most fun part" of the shoot, calling it a "classic TLC moment". VH1's writer Seher Sikandar described the dance during the song's chorus as the "modified butterfly with the swing-scoop arm", while The Telegraph's Bernadette McNulty's dance tip for her readers was: "Feet apart, bounce your knees as low as they will go while winding your hips." In another scene, Watkins is seen in a closed bar singing into an old-fashioned microphone, being backed by a trumpeter, with her love interest, played by Omar Lopez. Throughout the clip, Watkins keeps giving the man an incredulous look that suggests he might be cheating. The video ends with the trio dancing arguing jokingly. This was Thomas's favorite scene. "Creep" was released in the United Kingdom in January 1996.

The group acknowledged one scene that showed the exposed left lower part of Watkins's breasts received public attention.

An alternative cut for the video has also been made. The original version appeared on three of their video albums: CrazyVideoCool (1995), Now & Forever: The Video Hits (2003) and Artist Collection (2004). CrazyVideoCool included excerpts of previously-scrapped versions and commentary from TLC.

=== Reception and impact ===
Many publications considered the video "iconic" and "classic". David Asante of MOBO Awards' blog called it "one of the most celebrated pop videos of all time". Daniel Ralston, host of MTV's Videohead podcast said Rolston flipped the "paradigm" on "Creep", "Whatta Man" and many of his works, where the women were in control and men were shown in a way that women were often depicted in male artists' videos. Idolator's Robbie Daw found the women comfortable with their own sexuality in the clip and said "What girl in the mid-90s did not want to emulate that?". Anthony DeCurtis of Vibe claimed that the visuals for "Creep" and "Red Light Special" set the standard for video eroticism at the time.

Lindsay Zoladz, a writer of Pitchfork, observed when most people think of TLC, their brains immediately go to the sounds and images of CrazySexyCool—"Waterfalls", "Red Light Special" and the silk pajamas in "Creep". Ebony's Michael A. Gonzales reminisced about the time when the video debuted on MTV, TLC returned as the "lipstick liberators", much to the surprise of a public used to their tomboy style. The journalist then compared the "splashy" video to its previous versions as "less urban" and more "Madison Avenue commercial chic". Like Gonzales, PopMatters' writer Quentin B. Huff also noticed the "striking" difference between the T-shirt and baggy pants look on their last video "What About Your Friends" and the new "silky nightgown come-ons" look on "Creep" and "Red Light Special". In the book Experiencing Music Video: Aesthetics and Cultural Context, author Carol Vernallis felt the women's outfits in "Creep" suggested their "sexual availability" but the low-angle camera placement, and the texture and movement of billowing silk fabric suggest a "phallic sexuality".

After the video's release, the pajamas created "a fashion stir". The group intended to create a low-price fashion line called "Creepwear" but it was ultimately scrapped. Dazed Digital's editor Tempe Nakiska later mentioned the trio's pajamas as "one of the greatest group coordinates of all time" while Canadian Fashion magazine chose the clip as one of the most fashionable. VH1's Seher Sikandar listed the video's choreography as one of the top-twenty R&B dance routines of the 1990s. It appeared at number six on Consequence of Sound's fifty best 1994 videos list, and at number 30 on Complex's top fifty R&B clips of the 1990s.

The visual was one of several parodied in Blink 182's video "All the Small Things" in 2000. Keri Hilson's 2010 music video "Pretty Girl Rock" had the singer with two backup dancers dressed in silk pajamas imitating Watkins and the group from the original clip. In 2014, shot-for-shot re-enactments of the videos for "Creep", "Waterfalls" and "No Scrubs" were produced for their biopic CrazySexyCool: The TLC Story, with Keke Palmer playing Thomas, Drew Sidora as Watkins and rapper Lil Mama as Lopes, the three wearing TLC's original wardrobe from each video. In 2016, the pajamas were said to have inspired Thomas and rapper-actor Nick Cannon's outfits in his music video for "If I Was Your Man", where Thomas has a cameo role as Cannon's love interest.

== Live performances ==
TLC first performed "Creep" on television for the Nickelodeon series All That on January 7, 1995, followed by a performance on the May 6 episode of Saturday Night Live along with "Red Light Special". Complex chose the All That performance as one of the best of the series, while "Red Light Special" appeared on the compilation SNL25 – Saturday Night Live, The Musical Performances Volume 2 (1999), though Billboard's Michael Paoletta described it as "awful". Later in July, the trio joined other artists on the 16th Annual Budweiser Superfest Tour, with "Creep" added to their playlist. On stage, they performed the song to an audience of 3,000–6,000 in front of the letters "CrazySexyCool". Many girls wore cropped T-shirts with oversized jeans held up by thick belts. Chicago Tribune's reporter Rohan B. Preston said their set "lit torches for female desire" their songs "Creep" and "Red Light Special". Complex chose their performance of "CrazySexyMedley"—which included "Ain't 2 Proud 2 Beg", "Kick Your Game", "Creep" and "Waterfalls"—at the 1995 MTV Video Music Awards as one of the ceremony's twenty best performances of all-time. Writer Edwin Ortiz declared: "Back in the '90s, no female R&B act could touch TLC." A "Hitmix" medley was put together for their September 28 appearance on Top of the Pops, made of three CrazySexyCool singles: "Creep", "Waterfalls" and "Diggin' on You".

In October 1999, they performed the song in their famous silk pajamas during FanMail Tour's third act, which represented the songs of CrazySexyCool. Its January 29, 2000, show in Atlanta was taped for the March 18 pay-per-view special TLC: Sold Out, while a few clips of the January 23 concert at MCI Center, in Washington, D.C. were later included on the CD and DVD of TLC 20: 20th Anniversary Hits (2013), a Japan-only compilation. After Lopes's death in 2002, Watkins and Thomas first appeared as a two-piece group at Giant Stadium, New York City for Z100's annual Zootopia concert on June 1, 2003. For what was billed as the group's final performance, they wore baggy white jumpsuits while singing "Creep" with four backup dancers. The duo added the song to their greatest-hits performance on the finale of their reality show R U the Girl, which aired on September 21, 2005.

Seven years later, the two performed the song at the Japanese Springroove Music Festival on April 4, 2009, and at the October 17 set of Justin Timberlake's charity concert, Justin Timberlake and Friends, at the Mandalay Bay Events Center, Las Vegas. This performance marked their first live-concert US appearance in six years, however, the Las Vegas Review-Journal reported that the girls had been lip-syncing throughout the show. On October 16, 2013, TLC sang the song during their hit-medley on talk show The View with a separate televised live rendition of the track for VH1's Super Bowl Blitz concert at the Beacon Theatre on January 30, 2014, where they wore revealing black lace attire. Intermittently, "Creep" was added to many of their performances, notably the 2015 The Main Event tour with main act New Kids on the Block, and other shows across America, Canada, Australia, New Zealand, Japan and the Philippines.

== Cover versions and usage in media ==
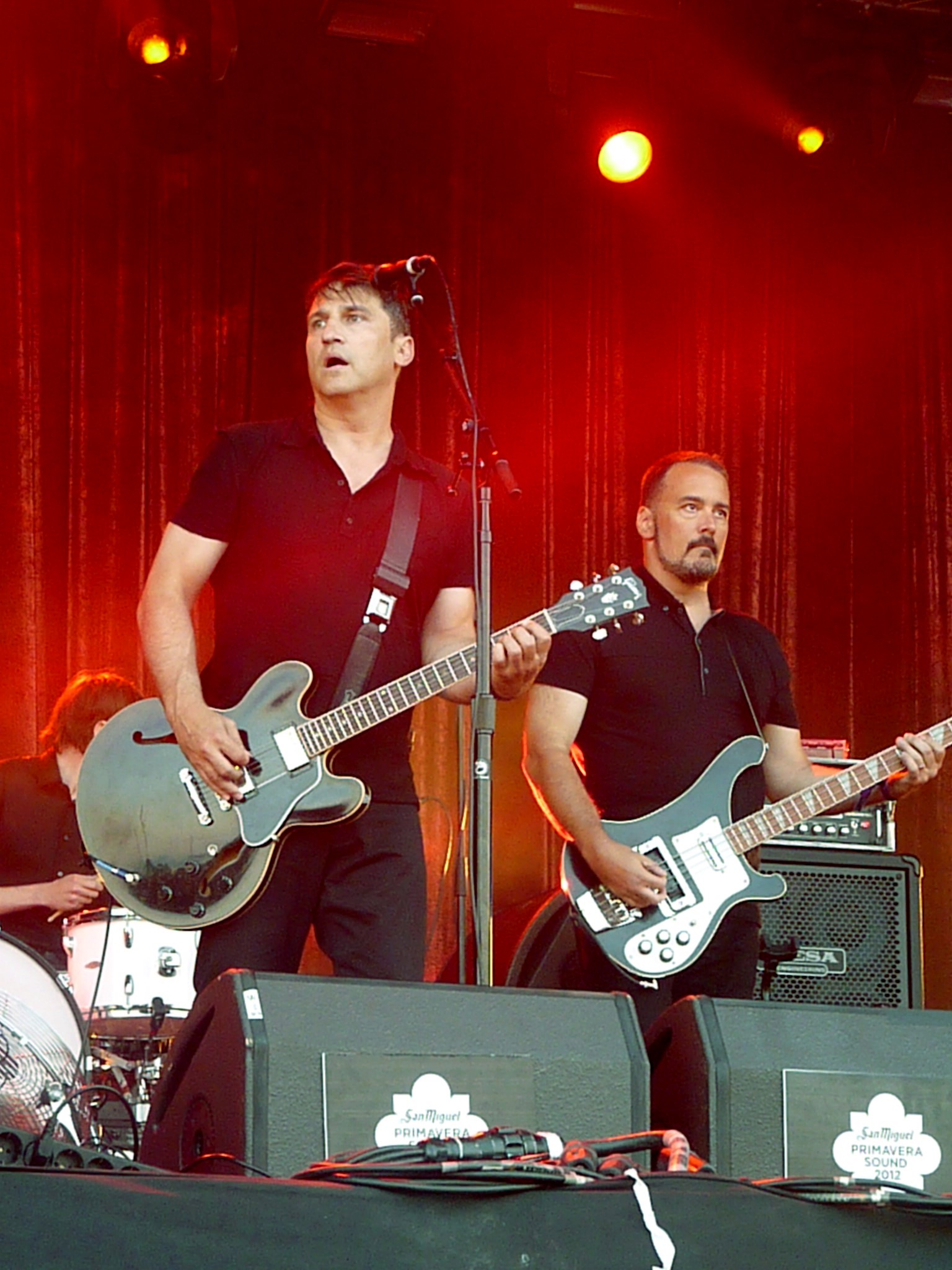
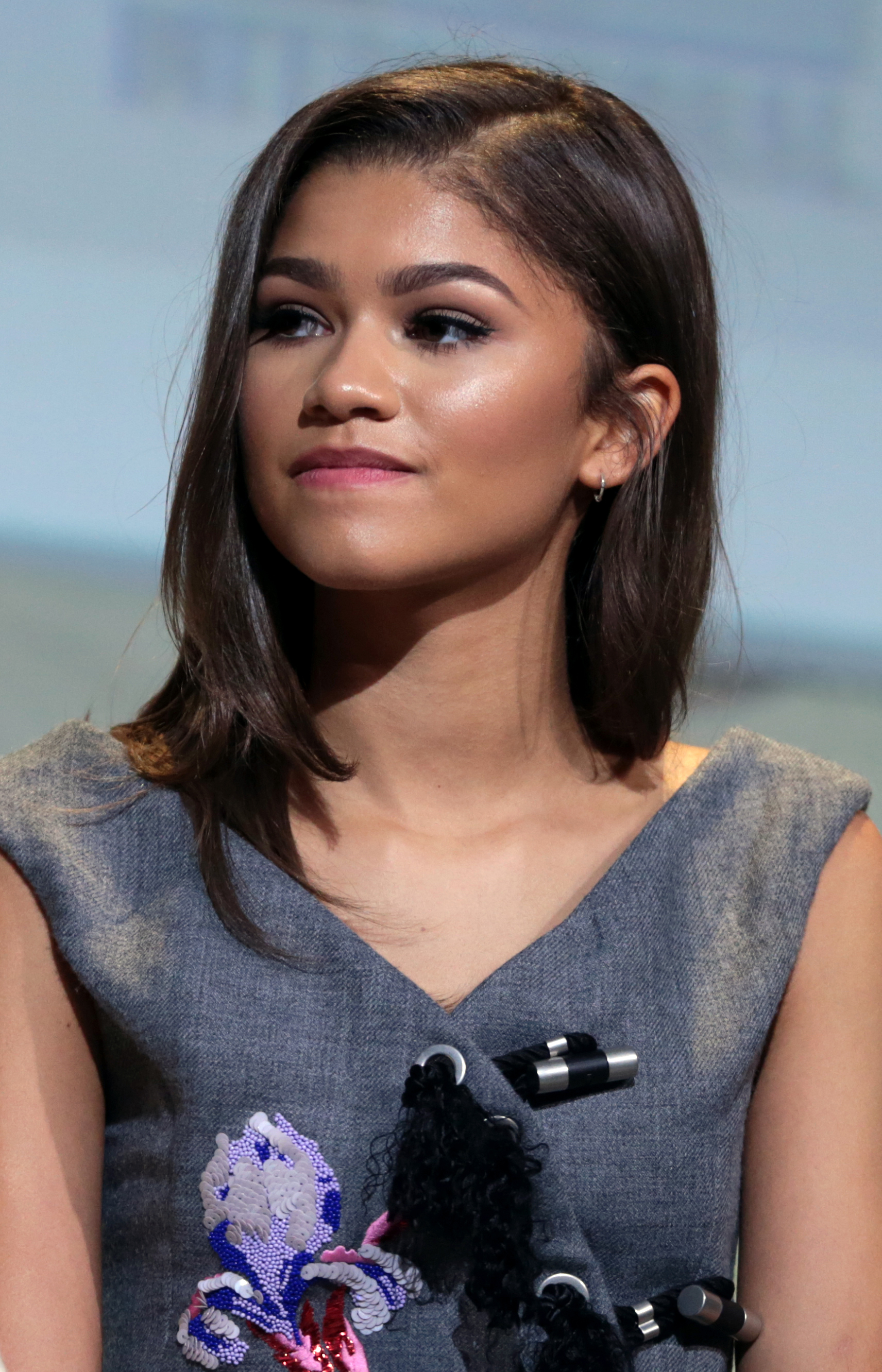
Rock band The Afghan Whigs (left) covered "Creep" in 1996 while singer Zendaya (right) sampled the track for "Something New", a single featuring Chris Brown, in 2016.

In 1996, American rock band The Afghan Whigs covered the song and included it on two of their extended plays, Honky's Ladder and Bonnie & Clyde EP. Journalist Jason Ankeny from AllMusic said the rendition proved that "even if [band member Greg Dulli] doesn't possess a heart, he at least has a brain -- albeit in his pants". According to Spin, "Creep" was also reportedly sung by the famous Las Vegas entertainer Wayne Newton. In 2014, singers Nick Carter and Jordan Knight covered the song as part of a 1990s hits medley on their North American tour. On the 2015 season of Idols South Africa contestants Mmatema Moremi, Busisiwe Mthembu and Nonhle Mhlongo performed the song during the show's Hell Week round. The X Factor UK's contestant Honey G covered the track during the bootcamp episode aired in 2016.

"Creep" has been covered, sampled and recreated by many hip-hop and R&B artists. Two notable recordings were released on SoundCloud in 2013: Haitian-Canadian record producer Kaytranada's remix of the song called "Kaytranada's Creepier Edition" in January and GoldLink's rap rendition in December. In July 2015, American singer-songwriter Eric Bellinger re-wrote and recorded a new version of the track for his album Cuffing Season. He invited Watkins to contribute vocals for a new verse. "When I heard [the original version] flip I immediately knew I had to at least try to get T-Boz on it since that was her solo song with [TLC]! Luckily when she heard the record she loved it!" Bellinger said in a statement sent to MTV News. The track's new content finds Bellinger making promises to never cheat on his lover. "Creep" appeared on The Game's "Sex Skit" from his album The Documentary 2.5, released in October 2015. In February 2016, singer Zendaya sampled the song for her single "Something New" with Chris Brown. She said: "The song, when I first heard it, already had that TLC sample in it. And that's kind of what I think made me want to record it." Watkins is confirmed to have a cameo on its music video, which remains unreleased.

In other media, "Creep" was included on "CAT", an episode from season one of the television series New York Undercover, which first aired on February 23, 1995. In December of that year, the song was used on the soundtrack of the film Waiting to Exhale; TLC also recorded a new song, "This Is How It Works", for the film's soundtrack album. In 2010, "Creep" and "Waterfalls" were played in the comedy film The Other Guys, with a running gag that Michael Keaton's character would subconsciously reference TLC's lyrics without having any idea who the group is. In literature, South African poet and novelist Mandla Langa mentioned the trio's music video in his book The Memory of Stones in 2000, referring to them as "the legend". The song can be heard on the soundtracks for video games The Hip Hop Dance Experience, Everybody Dance and Dance Central Spotlight.

== Track listings and formats ==
=== "Creep" ===
European CD; US cassette; Japanese mini-CD single

1. "Creep" (album version) – 4:29
2. "Creep" (instrumental album version) – 4:47

UK 12-inch single

1. "Creep" (album version) – 4:30
2. "Creep" (Untouchables mix) – 5:26
3. "Creep" (Untouchables instrumental) – 5:18
4. "Creep" (Jermaine's Jeep mix) – 5:11
5. "Creep" (Super Smooth mix) – 4:44
6. "Creep" (Jermaine's acappella mix) – 5:09

UK CD single

1. "Creep" (album version) – 4:28
2. "Ain't 2 Proud 2 Beg" (Smoothed Down extended remix) – 5:53
3. "Creep" (Untouchables mix) – 5:22
4. "Creep" (Jermaine's acappella mix) – 5:09

UK and Germany maxi-CD single

1. "Creep" (album version) – 4:29
2. "Creep" (Super Smooth mix) – 4:42
3. "Creep" (Jermaine's Jeep mix) – 5:09
4. "Creep" (Jermaine's acappella mix) – 5:09
5. "Creep" (Untouchables instrumental) – 5:18
6. "Creep" (DARP mix) – 4:50

US 12-inch single No. 1

1. "Creep" (album version) – 4:27
2. "Creep" (Jermaine's Jeep mix) – 5:09
3. "Creep" (instrumental album version) – 4:47
4. "Creep" (Jermaine's acappella mix) – 5:09

US 12-inch single No. 2

1. "Creep" (Untouchables mix) – 5:22
2. "Creep" (DARP mix) – 4:50
3. "Creep" (Untouchables TV mix) – 5:23
4. "Creep" (Smooth mix) – 5:23
5. "Creep" (Untouchables instrumental) – 5:18

US maxi-CD single

1. "Creep" (album version) – 4:30
2. "Creep" (Jermaine's Jeep mix) – 5:11
3. "Creep" (Untouchables mix) – 5:26
4. "Creep" (Super Smooth mix) – 4:44
5. "Creep" (DARP mix) – 4:51
6. "Creep" (Untouchables instrumental) – 5:18

=== "Creep '96" ===
UK 12-inch single

1. "Creep" (Maxx remix) – 5:12
2. "Creep" (Jermaine's Jeep mix) – 5:13
3. "Creep" (Tin Tin Out remix) – 8:35
4. "Waterfalls" (DARP remix) – 4:32

UK cassette single

1. "Creep (radio edit – original version) – 4:28
2. "Waterfalls" (single edit) – 4:21

European CD single

1. "Creep (radio edit – original version) – 4:28
2. "Waterfalls" (single edit) – 4:21
3. "Creep" (Maxx remix) – 5:11
4. "Creep" (Tin Tin Out remix) – 8:35

== Credits ==
Credits adapted from the liner notes of the CD single, CrazySexyCool and CrazyVideoCool.

Recording and management

- Recorded and mixed at DARP Studios (Atlanta)
- Mastered at The Hit Factory (New York City)
- Contains a sample of "Hey Young World", written by Ricky Walters and performed by Slick Rick, published by Def American Songs, Inc., courtesy of Def Jam Recordings, Inc.
- Contains a sample from "Who the Cap Fits", written by Edmund Carl Aiken Jr. PKA Shinehead, and performed by Shinehead, published by African Love Music/Def American Songs, Inc. under license from African Love Music
- Managed by Hiriam Management
- Published by EMI April Music Inc., Darp Music (ASCAP)

Personnel

- Dallas Austin – writing, production, instrumentation, executive production
- Atvi Speights – record engineering, mixing
- Leslie Brathwaite – record engineering
- Carl Glover – record engineering assistance
- Brian Smith – record engineering assistance
- Sol Messiah – scratching
- Rick Sheppard – MIDI and sound design
- Debra Killings – background vocals
- Chris Gehringer – mastering
- Antonio M. Reid – executive production
- Kenneth Edmonds – executive production
- Perri Reid – executive production
- Dah Len – photography
- Davett Singletary – creative direction
- Christopher Stern – art direction

== Charts ==
=== Weekly charts ===
Weekly chart performance for "Creep"
Chart (1994–1995)	Peak position
Australia (ARIA)	20
Belgium (Ultratop 50 Flanders)	45
Canada Top Singles (RPM)	41
Canada Dance/Urban (RPM)	3
Europe (Eurochart Hot 100)	62
Europe (European Dance Radio)	3
Europe (European Hit Radio)	16
France (SNEP)	23
Germany (GfK)	39
Israel (IBA)	15
Netherlands (Dutch Top 40)	27
Netherlands (Single Top 100)	19
New Zealand (Recorded Music NZ)	4
Scottish Singles Sales (Official Charts)	44
Switzerland (Schweizer Hitparade)	26
UK Singles (Official Charts)	22
UK Dance (Official Charts)	12
UK Hip Hop/R&B (Official Charts)	4
US Billboard Hot 100	1
US Dance Singles Sales (Billboard)	1
US Hot R&B/Hip-Hop Songs (Billboard)	1
US Pop Airplay (Billboard)	9
US Rhythmic Airplay (Billboard)	1
US Cash Box Top 100	2

Weekly chart performance for "Creep '96"
Chart (1996)	Peak position
Australia (ARIA) Creep 96	45
Europe (Eurochart Hot 100)	43
Ireland (IRMA)	9
Netherlands (Dutch Top 40 Tipparade) Creep 96	19
Netherlands (Single Top 100 Tipparade) Creep 96	5
Sweden (Sverigetopplistan)	56
Scottish Singles Sales (Official Charts)	17
UK Singles (Official Charts)	6
UK Dance (Official Charts)	8
UK Hip Hop/R&B (Official Charts)	3
UK Club Chart (Music Week)	75

=== Year-end charts ===
Year-end chart performance for "Creep"
Chart (1995)	Position
Australia (ARIA)	85
Brazil (Crowley)	17
Canada Dance/Urban (RPM)	35
New Zealand (RIANZ)	35
US Billboard Hot 100	3
US Hot R&B Singles (Billboard)	1
US Maxi-Singles Sales (Billboard)	5
US Top 40/Mainstream (Billboard)	25
US Top 40/Rhythm-Crossover (Billboard)	1
US Cash Box Top 100	8

=== Decade-end charts ===
Decade-end chart performance for "Creep"
Chart (1990–1999)	Position
US Billboard Hot 100	21

=== All-time charts ===
All-time chart performance for "Creep"
Chart (1958–2018)	Position
US Billboard Hot 100	172

== Certifications ==
Certifications for "Creep"
Region	Certification	Certified units/sales
Canada (Music Canada)	Gold	40,000^{‡}
New Zealand (RMNZ)	Platinum	30,000^{‡}
United Kingdom (BPI)	Gold	400,000^{‡}
United States (RIAA)	Platinum	1,000,000^{^}
^{^} Shipments figures based on certification alone.^{‡} Sales+streaming figures based on certification alone.

== See also ==
- List of number-one R&B singles of 1994 (U.S.)
- List of number-one R&B singles of 1995 (U.S.)
- List of Billboard Hot 100 number-one singles of 1995

== Bibliography ==
- Beebe, Roger (2007). Medium Cool: Music Videos from Soundies to Cellphones. Duke University Press. ISBN 978-0-8223-4162-8.
- Gambaccini, Paul; Read, Mike; Rice, Tim; Rice, Jonathan "Jo" (2004). British Hit Singles & Albums (17th ed.). HIT Entertainment/Guinness World Records. ISBN 0-85112-199-3.
- Hess, Mickey (2007). Icons of Hip Hop: An Encyclopedia of the Movement, Music, and Culture, Volume 2. Greenwood Publishing Group. ISBN 978-0-313-33904-2.
- Krulik, Nancy (2002). Lisa Lopes: The Life of a Supernova. Simon & Schuster. ISBN 1-4391-0409-3.
- Langa, Mandla (2000). The Memory of Stones. New Africa Books. ISBN 0-86486-408-6.
- Pollock, Bruce (2005). Rock Song Index: The 7500 Most Important Songs for the Rock and Roll Era (2 ed.). Routledge. ISBN 0-415-97073-3.
- Poulson-Bryant, Scott; Fontaine, Smokey (2002). What's Your Hi-Fi Q?: From Prince to Puff Daddy, 30 Years of Black Music Trivia. Fireside Books. ISBN 0-7432-2955-X.
- Vernallis, Carol (2004). Experiencing Music Video: Aesthetics and Cultural Context. Columbia University Press. ISBN 0-231-11799-X.
- Vibe (2001). Hip Hop Divas. Three Rivers Press. ISBN 0-609-80836-2.
