= List of Billboard Hot 100 top-ten singles in 1992 =

This is a list of singles that have peaked in the Top 10 of the Billboard Hot 100 during 1992. TLC, Boyz II Men, Mariah Carey, En Vogue, and Michael Jackson each had three top-ten hits in 1992, tying them for the most top-ten hits during the year.

With the new chart methodology implemented on November 30, 1991, it had a drastic effect on the amount of top tens throughout the year. A total of 77 songs reached the top ten, a huge decline from 111 songs from the previous year, with 68 songs that peaked that year while the remaining nine peaked in 1991 or 1993. 13 songs hit number one that year, while 10 songs peaked at number two.

One effect the new chart methodology had were songs that spend a lot more weeks in the top ten than usual from the previous years. Fifteen songs spent twelve weeks or more in the top 10, the first to do so since early 1984. "End of the Road" spent a then-record 19 weeks in the top 10 in a single chart run, alongside a record 13-week stay at number one.

== Top-ten singles ==
- (#) – 1992 Year-end top 10 single position and rank

List of Billboard Hot 100 top ten singles which peaked in 1992
Top ten entry date	Single	Artist(s)	Peak	Peak date	Weeks in top ten
Singles from 1991
November 30	"All 4 Love" (#9)	Color Me Badd	1	January 25	14
December 7	"Can't Let Go"	Mariah Carey	2	January 25	11
December 14	"Finally"	CeCe Peniston	5	January 18	10
December 21	"2 Legit 2 Quit"	MC Hammer	5	January 11	4
Singles from 1992
January 11	"Smells Like Teen Spirit"	Nirvana	6	January 11	8
January 11	"Addams Groove"	MC Hammer	7	January 11	2
January 11	"Don't Let the Sun Go Down on Me"	George Michael & Elton John	1	February 1	8
January 18	"Diamonds and Pearls"	Prince and the New Power Generation	3	February 15	9
January 18	"I Love Your Smile"	Shanice	2	February 1	11
January 25	"Mysterious Ways"	U2	9	January 25	1
January 25	"I'm Too Sexy"	Right Said Fred	1	February 8	12
February 1	"Tell Me What You Want Me to Do"	Tevin Campbell	6	February 29	7
February 8	"To Be with You"	Mr. Big	1	February 29	9
February 15	"Remember the Time"	Michael Jackson	3	March 7	9
February 29	"Masterpiece"	Atlantic Starr	3	April 11	9
March 7	"Save the Best for Last" (#4)	Vanessa Williams	1	March 21	13
March 7	"Tears in Heaven" (#6)	Eric Clapton	2	March 28	12
March 7	"Good for Me"	Amy Grant	8	March 21	3
March 21	"I Can't Dance"	Genesis	7	April 11	4
March 21	"Breakin' My Heart (Pretty Brown Eyes)"	Mint Condition	6	April 11	5
March 28	"Make It Happen"	Mariah Carey	5	April 11	7
April 4	"Beauty and the Beast"	Celine Dion & Peabo Bryson	9	April 18	2
April 11	"Ain't 2 Proud 2 Beg"	TLC	6	April 25	9
April 11	"Bohemian Rhapsody"	Queen	2	May 9	8
April 18	"Jump" (#3)	Kris Kross	1	April 25	13
April 18	"My Lovin' (You're Never Gonna Get It)" (#7)	En Vogue	2	May 16	13
April 25	"Hazard"	Richard Marx	9	April 25	2
April 25	"Live and Learn"	Joe Public	4	May 23	8
May 2	"Everything About You"	Ugly Kid Joe	9	May 2	4
May 9	"Under the Bridge" (#8)	Red Hot Chili Peppers	2	June 6	12
May 16	"One"	U2	10	May 16	1
May 23	"In the Closet"	Michael Jackson	6	May 30	4
May 30	"Baby Got Back" (#2)	Sir Mix-a-Lot	1	July 4	15
May 30	"Damn! I Wish I Was Your Lover"	Sophie B. Hawkins	5	June 27	7
June 6	"I'll Be There"	Mariah Carey	1	June 20	8
June 6	"If You Asked Me To"	Celine Dion	4	July 11	8
June 13	"The Best Things in Life Are Free"	Luther Vandross & Janet Jackson featuring BBD & Ralph Tresvant	10	June 13	3
June 20	"Achy Breaky Heart"	Billy Ray Cyrus	4	July 18	10
June 20	"Tennessee"	Arrested Development	6	July 18	5
July 4	"Wishing on a Star"	The Cover Girls	9	July 18	5
July 18	"Baby-Baby-Baby" (#5)	TLC	2	August 15	14
July 18	"This Used to Be My Playground"	Madonna	1	August 8	8
July 18	"Just Another Day" (#10)	Jon Secada	5	August 1	12
July 25	"Life Is a Highway"	Tom Cochrane	6	August 22	6
August 1	"November Rain"	Guns N' Roses	3	August 29	10
August 1	"End of the Road" (#1)	Boyz II Men	1	August 15	19
August 1	"Giving Him Something He Can Feel"	En Vogue	6	September 12	7
August 8	"Too Funky"	George Michael	10	August 8	1
August 15	"Move This"	Technotronic featuring Ya Kid K	6	September 5	3
August 22	"Stay"	Shakespears Sister	4	September 19	7
August 29	"Humpin' Around"	Bobby Brown	3	September 12	8
September 12	"Sometimes Love Just Ain't Enough"	Patty Smyth & Don Henley	2	September 26	11
September 12	"Jump Around"	House of Pain	3	October 10	11
September 19	"The One"	Elton John	9	September 19	1
September 19	"She's Playing Hard to Get"	Hi-Five	5	October 17	7
September 26	"Please Don't Go"	KWS	6	October 17	5
October 10	"People Everyday"	Arrested Development	8	October 10	4
October 10	"When I Look Into Your Eyes"	FireHouse	8	October 17	3
October 10	"I'd Die Without You"	P.M. Dawn	3	October 31	16
October 24	"Erotica"	Madonna	3	October 24	4
October 24	"How Do You Talk to an Angel"	The Heights	1	November 14	10
October 31	"Free Your Mind"	En Vogue	8	October 31	1
November 7	"Rump Shaker"	Wreckx-n-Effect	2	December 26	15
November 7	"Real Love"	Mary J. Blige	7	December 5	9
November 7	"What About Your Friends"	TLC	7	November 21	10
November 14	"If I Ever Fall in Love"	Shai	2	November 21	15
November 28	"I Will Always Love You"	Whitney Houston	1	November 28	16
November 28	"Good Enough"	Bobby Brown	7	December 26	10

=== 1991 peaks ===
List of Billboard Hot 100 top ten singles in 1992 which peaked in 1991
Top ten entry date	Single	Artist(s)	Peak	Peak date	Weeks in top ten
November 9	"When a Man Loves a Woman"	Michael Bolton	1	November 23	9
November 9	"It's So Hard to Say Goodbye to Yesterday"	Boyz II Men	2	December 14	11
November 16	"Set Adrift on Memory Bliss"	P.M. Dawn	1	November 30	8
November 23	"Blowing Kisses in the Wind"	Paula Abdul	6	November 30	7
November 30	"Black or White"	Michael Jackson	1	December 7	10
December 14	"Wildside"	Marky Mark and the Funky Bunch	10	December 14	5

=== 1993 peaks ===
List of Billboard Hot 100 top ten singles in 1992 which peaked in 1993
Top ten entry date	Single	Artist(s)	Peak	Peak date	Weeks in top ten
October 31	"Rhythm Is a Dancer"	Snap!	5	January 2	14
December 12	"In the Still of the Nite"	Boyz II Men	3	January 16	11
December 26	"Saving Forever for You"	Shanice	4	January 30	10

== See also ==
- 1992 in music
- List of Billboard Hot 100 number ones of 1992
- Billboard Year-End Hot 100 singles of 1992
