= CrazyVideoCool =

Video by TLC
- Released: November 7, 1995
- Recorded: 1994–95
- Length: 29:40
- Label: 6 West Home Video; BMG Video
- Director: Matthew Rolston; F. Gary Gray
- Producer: Bille Woodruff

TLC chronology
| Oooooooohhh... On the Video Tip (1993) | CrazyVideoCool (1995) | Now & Forever: The Video Hits (2003) |

CrazyVideoCool is the second video album from American R&B trio TLC. The collection was released in the US after the release of the video, Diggin' on You in 1995, while in other countries it was released a year later. The compilation includes four complete videos from CrazySexyCool, as well as bonus excerpts from the unreleased versions of Creep, and the uncensored video for Red Light Special. In addition to the video 'Making of's', it also features interviews and live performances. The video peaked #5 in the Billboard Top Music Videos chart.

== Track listing ==
| No. | Title | Director(s) | Length |
|---|---|---|---|
| 1. | "CrazySexyCool montage" |
| 2. | "Excerpts from never-released 'Creep' videos" | Lionel C. Martin (second version) |
| 3. | "Interview" |
| 4. | "Creep" (music video) | Matthew Rolston |
| 5. | "Interview" |
| 6. | "Red Light Special" (music video) | Rolston |
| 7. | "Excerpts from sexier versions of 'Red Light Special'" | F. Gary Gray |
| 8. | "The making of 'Waterfalls'" |
| 9. | "Waterfalls" (music video) | Gray |
| 10. | "Behind the scenes of 'Diggin' on You'" |
| 11. | "Diggin' on You" (music video) | Gray |
| 12. | "Interview" |

== Charts ==
| Chart | Position |
|---|---|
| US Billboard Top Music Videos | 5 |

== Certifications and sales ==
| Region | Certification | Certified units/sales |
|---|---|---|
| United States (RIAA) | Gold | 50,000^{^} |
^{^} Shipments figures based on certification alone.

== Credits ==
Credits adapted from the liner notes of CrazyVideoCool.

Recording and management

- Contains a sample of "Hey Young World", written by Ricky Walters and performed by Slick Rick, published by Def American Songs, Inc., courtesy of Def Jam Recordings, Inc.
- Contains a sample from "Who the Cap Fits", written by Edmund Carl Aiken, Jr. professionally known as Shinehead, and performed by Shinehead, published by African Love Music/Def American Songs, Inc. under license from African Love Music

Personnel

- Bille Woodruff — producer
- Michelle Montgomery — associate producer
- Davett Singletary — executive in charge of production
- Antonio M. Reid — video executive producer
- Kenneth Edmonds — video executive producer
- Jon Marett — audio supervision
- Jon Herron — audio post engineer
- Sandy Lawrence — audio post engineer
- Arnold Turner — photographer
- Matthew Rolston — director
