= Hat 2 da Back =

Single by TLC

from the album Ooooooohhh... On the TLC Tip
- Released: September 3, 1992
- Genre: New jack swing
- Length: 4:16 (album version); 4:09 (radio edit)
- Label: LaFace; Arista
- Songwriters: Dallas Austin; Lisa "Left Eye" Lopes; Kevin Wales
- Producer: Dallas Austin

TLC singles chronology
"What About Your Friends" (1992)	"Hat 2 da Back" (1992)	"Get It Up" (1993)

Music video
- "Hat 2 da Back" on YouTube

"Hat 2 da Back" is a song by American girl group TLC from their debut studio album, Ooooooohhh... On the TLC Tip (1992). It was released as the album's fourth and final single. The song contains samples of "Big Ole Butt" by LL Cool J and "What Makes You Happy" by KC and the Sunshine Band. "Hat 2 da Back" reached number 30 on the Billboard Hot 100 and number 14 on Billboard's Hot R&B Singles chart.

== Music video ==
The music video is built around a remixed version of the song. The video depicts the group singing the song during a photo shoot and a concert, where a man is watching them and fantasizing about them in tight clothing as opposed to the baggy clothing they favor; ironically this foreshadowed them wearing gradually tighter and more feminine clothing from the CrazySexyCool era onwards. Hip hop duos Kris Kross and Illegal appear in the video.

== Track listings ==
- US CD single
1. "Hat 2 da Back" (Remix Radio Edit) – 4:12
2. "Hat 2 da Back" (Extended Remix) – 5:50
3. "Hat 2 da Back" (Remix Instrumental) – 4:12
- US 12-inch single

(Note: On some versions of the 12-inch single, the "Remix Radio Edit" is not mentioned on the record sleeve but is contained on the label and recording proper. This was fixed on later pressings.)

A1. "Hat 2 da Back" (Extended Remix) – 5:50
A2. "Hat 2 da Back" (Remix Radio Edit) – 4:12
B1. "Hat 2 da Back" (Album Version) – 4:16
B2. "Hat 2 da Back" (Remix Instrumental) – 4:12

- US cassette single
1. "Hat 2 da Back" (Radio Edit) – 4:07
2. "Hat 2 da Back" (Album Version) – 4:16

== Charts ==
=== Weekly charts ===
Chart (1993)	Peak position
New Zealand (Recorded Music NZ)	22
US Billboard Hot 100	30
US Dance Singles Sales (Billboard)	26
US Hot R&B/Hip-Hop Songs (Billboard)	14
US Rhythmic Airplay (Billboard)	14

=== Year-end charts ===
Chart (1993)	Position
US Hot R&B/Hip-Hop Songs (Billboard)	100
