= Ooooooohhh... On the TLC Tip =

1992 studio album by TLC

Studio album by TLC
- Released: February 25, 1992
- Recorded: April–December 1991
- Studios: Doppler, LaCoCo and Bosstown (Atlanta, Georgia); House of Hits (Chestnut Ridge, New York)
- Genres: R&B; hip-hop; new jack swing; pop
- Length: 55:32
- Label: LaFace
- Producers: Dallas Austin; Babyface; Jermaine Dupri; Da Funky Bunch; Kayo; Marley Marl; L.A. Reid; Daryl Simmons

TLC chronology
| Ooooooohhh... On the TLC Tip (1992) | CrazySexyCool (1994) |

Singles from Ooooooohhh... On the TLC Tip
- 1. "Ain't 2 Proud 2 Beg" Released: November 22, 1991; 2. "Baby-Baby-Baby" Released: June 5, 1992; 3. "What About Your Friends" Released: August 21, 1992; 4. "Hat 2 da Back" Released: September 3, 1992

Ooooooohhh... On the TLC Tip is the debut studio album by American girl group TLC, released on February 25, 1992, by LaFace Records. The title of the album comes from the last line of Left Eye's rap on "Ain't 2 Proud 2 Beg".

The album peaked at number 14 on the US Billboard 200 and has been certified quadruple platinum by the Recording Industry Association of America (RIAA), denoting shipments in excess of four million copies in the United States. It is also TLC's third most successful album (after CrazySexyCool and FanMail, respectively), having sold over six million copies worldwide.

== Background ==
TLC signed their first contract with LaFace Records on February 28, 1991 (amended April 3, 1991, with Thomas), and began production on their debut album. They collaborated with Babyface, L.A. Reid, Dallas Austin, Da Funky Bunch, Jermaine Dupri, and Marley Marl, who helped Lopes with the songwriting. The album was finished in December 1991.

== Critical reception ==
Professional ratings
Review scores
| Source | Rating |
|---|---|
| AllMusic | 3/5 stars |
| Robert Christgau | (neither) |
| The Encyclopedia of Popular Music | 2/5 stars |
| Entertainment Weekly | A |
| The Rolling Stone Album Guide | 2/5 stars |

Ken Tucker of Entertainment Weekly praised the effort as well as the group and its message, calling TLC "a perfect pop group for the times." In a fairly positive review, Steve Huey of AllMusic states that "although it's uneven, the best moments of On the TLC Tip deserved their popularity, and set the stage for the group's blockbuster success the next time out."

== Commercial performance ==
Ooooooohhh... On the TLC Tip debuted at number 105 on the US Billboard 200, and reached number 14 on the chart and number three on the Top R&B/Hip-Hop Albums chart. It was certified quadruple platinum by the Recording Industry Association of America (RIAA) on May 1, 1996, and by October 2003, it had sold 2.5 million copies in the United States. The album had sold over six million copies worldwide as of December 2011.

== Track listing ==
| No. | Title | Writer(s) | Producer(s) | Length |
|---|---|---|---|---|
| 1. | "Intro" | | | 0:30 |
| 2. | "Ain't 2 Proud 2 Beg" | Dallas Austin; Lisa Lopes | Austin | 5:36 |
| 3. | "Shock Dat Monkey" | Antonio Reid; Kenneth Edmonds; Daryl Simmons; Lopes | Reid; Babyface; Simmons^{[a]}; Kayo^{[a]} | 5:08 |
| 4. | "Intermission I" | | | 0:19 |
| 5. | "Hat 2 da Back" | Austin; Lopes; Kevin Wales | Austin | 4:16 |
| 6. | "Das da Way We Like 'Em" | Lopes; Tionne Watkins; Rozonda Thomas; Marlon Williams | Marl | 5:01 |
| 7. | "What About Your Friends" | Austin; Lopes | Austin | 4:53 |
| 8. | "His Story" | Austin | Austin | 4:23 |
| 9. | "Intermission II" | | | 0:59 |
| 10. | "Bad by Myself" | Jermaine Dupri; Dionne Farris; Terrence Shelton; Lopes | Dupri; Da Funky Bunch | 3:55 |
| 11. | "Somethin' You Wanna Know" | Simmons; Edmonds; Reid; Lopes; Kayo | Simmons; Kayo | 5:43 |
| 12. | "Baby-Baby-Baby" | Reid; Edmonds; Simmons | Reid; Babyface; Simmons | 5:15 |
| 13. | "This Is How It Should Be Done" | Lopes; Williams | Marl | 4:27 |
| 14. | "Depend on Myself" | Austin; Lopes | Austin | 4:11 |
| 15. | "Conclusion" | | | 0:48 |

=== Notes ===
- ^{^[a]} signifies a co-producer
- Most digital platforms list "Das Da Way We Like 'Em" under the alternate title "Way We Like 'Em"

=== Sample credits ===
- "Ain't 2 Proud 2 Beg" samples "Escape-ism" by James Brown, "Jungle Boogie" by Kool & the Gang, "School Boy Crush" by Average White Band, "Fly, Robin, Fly" by Silver Convention, and "Take Me to the Mardi Gras" by Bob James.
- "Shock Dat Monkey" samples "Get Me Back on Time, Engine Number 9" by Wilson Pickett, "Funky Drummer" by James Brown, and "Funky President (People It's Bad)" by James Brown.
- "Hat 2 da Back" samples "Big Ole Butt" by LL Cool J and "What Makes You Happy" by KC and the Sunshine Band.
- "Das da Way We Like 'Em" samples "Think (About It)" by Lyn Collins and "UFO" by ESG.
- "Bad by Myself" samples "Welcome to the Terrordome" by Public Enemy, "Peter Piper" by Run-DMC, "Last Night Changed It All (I Really Had a Ball)" by Esther Williams, and "Peace Is Not the Word to Play" by Main Source.
- "This Is How It Should Be Done" samples "We're a Winner" by the Impressions and "I Know You Got Soul" by Eric B. & Rakim.
- "Depend on Myself" samples "Son of Shaft" and "Humpin'" by the Bar-Kays.

== Personnel ==
Credits adapted from the liner notes of Ooooooohhh... On the TLC Tip.

=== Musicians ===
- Dallas Austin – arrangements (tracks 2, 5, 7, 8, 14); shouts (track 2); keyboards, drum programming, bass, guitar
- Rick Sheppard – programming (tracks 2, 5, 7, 8, 14); sampling (tracks 2, 7, 8, 14)
- Debra Killings – background vocals (tracks 2, 5, 7, 8, 12, 14)
- TLC – background vocals (tracks 2, 3, 5–8, 10–14); shouts (track 2)
- Kevin Wales – shouts (track 2)
- Eloc – shouts (track 2)
- Fabian Ford – shouts (track 2)
- Babyface – keyboards (tracks 3, 12)
- L.A. Reid – drums (tracks 3, 11, 12); percussion (track 12)
- Kayo – bass (tracks 3, 11, 12); background vocals (track 3)
- Donald Parks – programming (tracks 3, 11, 12)
- X-Man – scratching, sampling (tracks 3, 5)
- Daryl Simmons – additional vocal arrangements (as DeRock Simmons) (tracks 5, 7); keyboards (track 11)
- Marley Marl – arrangements (tracks 6, 13)
- Darren Lighty – keyboards, programming (tracks 6, 13)
- Mary Brown – background vocals (track 6)
- Marsha McClurkin – background vocals (track 6)
- Jermaine Dupri – arrangements, vocal arrangements, all instruments, programming (track 10)
- Dionne Farris – vocal arrangements, background vocals (track 10)
- Seldon "Big Wally" Henderson – additional strings (track 10)
- Tye-V – background vocals (track 11)

=== Technical ===
- Dallas Austin – production, mixing (tracks 2, 5, 7, 8, 14)
- Dave Way – mixing (tracks 2, 3, 5, 7, 8, 11, 12, 14); mix engineering
- L.A. Reid – production (tracks 3, 12); mixing (tracks 3, 11, 12); executive production
- Babyface – production (tracks 3, 12); executive production
- Daryl Simmons – co-production (track 3); production (tracks 11, 12)
- Kayo – co-production (track 3); production (track 11)
- Marley Marl – production, mixing (tracks 6, 13); mix engineering
- Jermaine Dupri – production, mixing (track 10)
- Da Funky Bunch – production (track 10)
- Darin Prindle – recording engineering
- Jim "Z" Zumpano – recording engineering, mix engineering assistance
- John Pace – recording engineering
- Alvin Speights – recording engineering, mix engineering
- Frank Heller – recording engineering
- Steve "Stizz" S'berg – recording engineering assistance
- Brandi Parisi – recording engineering assistance
- John Rogers – recording engineering assistance
- Mitch Eaton – recording engineering assistance
- Phil Tan – recording engineering assistance, mix engineering assistance
- Matt Still – recording engineering assistance, mix engineering assistance
- Yvette Whitaker – album coordination
- Constance Armstrong – album coordination
- Herb Powers Jr. – mastering

=== Artwork ===
- Calvin Lowery – art direction, design
- Michael Lavine – photography
- Davett Singletary – art coordination
- Perri Reid – art coordination
- TLC – album concept

== Charts ==
=== Weekly charts ===
Weekly chart performance for Ooooooohhh... On the TLC Tip
| Chart (1992–1993) | Peak position |
|---|---|
| Australian Albums (ARIA) | 99 |
| Canada Top Albums/CDs (RPM) | 35 |
| US Billboard 200 | 14 |
| US Top R&B/Hip-Hop Albums (Billboard) | 3 |

=== Year-end charts ===
1992 year-end chart performance for Ooooooohhh... On the TLC Tip
| Chart (1992) | Position |
|---|---|
| US Billboard 200 | 43 |
| US Top R&B/Hip-Hop Albums (Billboard) | 5 |

1993 year-end chart performance for Ooooooohhh... On the TLC Tip
| Chart (1993) | Position |
|---|---|
| US Billboard 200 | 54 |
| US Top R&B/Hip-Hop Albums (Billboard) | 35 |

== Certifications ==
Certifications for Ooooooohhh... On the TLC Tip
| Region | Certification | Certified units/sales |
|---|---|---|
| Canada (Music Canada) | Platinum | 100,000^{^} |
| Japan (RIAJ) | Gold | 100,000^{^} |
| United States (RIAA) | 4× Platinum | 2,500,000 |
^{^} Shipments figures based on certification alone.

== Ooooooohhh... On the Video Tip ==
Ooooooohhh... On the Video Tip

Video by TLC
- Released: November 7, 1993
- Recorded: 1991–1993
- Length: 45 minutes (VHS); 54 minutes (LaserDisc; 1997 reissue)
- Label: LaFace
- Directors: Darren Grant; F. Gary Gray; Joseph Kahn; Lionel C. Martin; Matthew Rolston
- Producers: Lionel C. Martin; Matthew Rolston

TLC chronology
| Ooooooohhh... On the Video Tip (1993) | CrazyVideoCool (1996) |

Oooooooohhh... On the Video Tip is a compilation video album by TLC, containing all the music videos made for the group's debut album, as well as making-of features for the videos "Ain't 2 Proud 2 Beg", "Hat 2 da Back", "Baby-Baby-Baby", "Get It Up", "What About Your Friends" and "Sleigh Ride". Additional material includes, interviews, live performances and specially filmed segues. The compilation peaked at number seven on Billboard's Top Music Videos chart.

=== Track listing ===
| No. | Title | Director(s) | Length |
|---|---|---|---|
| 1. | "Ooooooohhh on the Video Tip" (intro) | Joseph Kahn | 2:11 |
| 2. | "Ooooooohhh... on the TLC Interview" | Faith Jones | 6:20 |
| 3. | "Behind the Scenes – Ain't 2 Proud 2 Beg" | Lionel C. Martin | 4:30 |
| 4. | "Ain't 2 Proud 2 Beg" (music video) | Lionel C. Martin | 4:10 |
| 5. | "Ain't 2 Proud 2 Beg" (live) | Thompson Lennier | 3:30 |
| 6. | "Behind the Scenes – What About Your Friends" | Matthew Rolston | 2:55 |
| 7. | "What About Your Friends" (music video) | Matthew Rolston | 4:20 |
| 8. | "Baby-Baby-Baby" (music video) | Keith Ward; Perri Reid | 4:10 |

==== Bonus ====
- Interactive Menu
- "Sleigh Ride" (music video) – 4:00
- "Hat 2 da Back" (music video) – 4:10
- "Get It Up" (music video) – 4:10
- "Baby-Baby-Baby" (live) – 4:30

=== Charts ===
Chart performance for Ooooooohhh... On the Video Tip
| Chart (1992) | Peak position |
|---|---|
| US Top Music Videos (Billboard) | 7 |
