= Baby-Baby-Baby =

1992 single by TLC

- European release artwork

Single by TLC

from the album Ooooooohhh... On the TLC Tip
- Released: June 5, 1992
- Genre: R&B
- Length: 5:12 (album version); 3:59 (album radio edit); 4:18 (remix radio edit)
- Label: LaFace; Arista
- Songwriters: Kenneth Edmonds; Antonio Reid; Daryl Simmons
- Producers: L.A. Reid; Babyface; Daryl Simmons

TLC singles chronology
"Ain't 2 Proud 2 Beg" (1991)	"Baby-Baby-Baby" (1992)	"What About Your Friends" (1992)

"Baby-Baby-Baby" is a song by American girl group TLC. It was the second single released from their debut studio album, Ooooooohhh... On the TLC Tip (1992), and their second consecutive top-10 hit. It was the most successful single from the album, reaching number two on the US Billboard Hot 100 and number one on the Billboard Hot R&B Singles chart, giving TLC their first number-one hit on the latter.

== Background ==
"Baby-Baby-Baby" was written and produced by Babyface, L.A. Reid and Daryl Simmons. The song features lead vocals from Tionne "T-Boz" Watkins, with Rozonda "Chilli" Thomas adlibbing and singing the middle-8 sections. It is the first song not to contain a rap by Lisa "Left Eye" Lopes, who instead recorded a rap for the song's remix version.

== Critical reception ==
Allmusic gave "Baby-Baby-Baby" a 5-star rating.

== Commercial performance ==
"Baby-Baby-Baby" held the runner-up spot on the Billboard Hot 100 for six consecutive weeks, from August 15 to September 19, 1992. It also reached number one on the Billboard Hot R&B Singles chart. "Baby-Baby-Baby" finished at number five on the Billboard Year-End Hot 100 Singles of 1992, and was certified Platinum by the Recording Industry Association of America (RIAA) in 1992.

== Music video ==
"Baby-Baby-Baby" had a video depicting TLC at Bowie State University campus and in their dorms, where they have a slumber party. One of the posters reads 'Protection is Priority'.

== Charts ==
=== Weekly charts ===
Weekly chart performance for "Baby-Baby-Baby"
Chart (1992–1993)	Peak position
Australia (ARIA)	95
Canada Top Singles (RPM)	13
Europe (European Dance Radio)	5
Israel (Israeli Singles Chart)	29
UK Singles (Official Charts)	55
UK Dance (Music Week)	44
US Billboard Hot 100	2
US Dance Singles Sales (Billboard)	19
US Hot R&B/Hip-Hop Songs (Billboard)	1
US Pop Airplay (Billboard)	9
US Rhythmic Airplay (Billboard)	2
US Cash Box Top 100	2

=== Year-end charts ===
Year-end chart performance for "Baby-Baby-Baby"
Chart (1992)	Position
US Billboard Hot 100	5
US Hot R&B Singles (Billboard)	7
US Cash Box Top 100	3

=== Decade-end charts ===
Decade-end chart performance for "Baby-Baby-Baby"
Chart (1990–1999)	Position
US Billboard Hot 100	80

== Certifications ==
Certifications and sales for "Baby-Baby-Baby"
Region	Certification	Certified units/sales
United States (RIAA)	Platinum	1,000,000^{^}
^{^} Shipments figures based on certification alone.

== Release history ==
Release dates and formats for "Baby-Baby-Baby"
Region	Date	Format(s)	Label(s)	Ref.
United States	June 5, 1992	12-inch vinyl; cassette	LaFace	
Japan	July 22, 1992	Mini-CD	LaFace; Arista	
United Kingdom	August 10, 1992	7-inch vinyl; 12-inch vinyl; CD; cassette	LaFace; Arista	
Sweden	August 31, 1992	CD	LaFace; Arista	
Australia	September 14, 1992	12-inch vinyl; CD; cassette	LaFace; Arista	

== See also ==
- List of number-one R&B singles of 1992 (U.S.)
