= What About Your Friends =

Single by TLC

from the album Ooooooohhh... On the TLC Tip
- Released: August 21, 1992
- Genre: New jack swing; R&B
- Length: 4:55 (album version); 4:00 (radio edit without rap); 4:06 (radio edit with rap)
- Label: LaFace; Arista
- Songwriters: Dallas Austin; Lisa "Left Eye" Lopes
- Producer: Dallas Austin

TLC singles chronology
"Baby-Baby-Baby" (1992)	"What About Your Friends" (1992)	"Hat 2 da Back" (1992)

Music video
- "What About Your Friends" on YouTube

"What About Your Friends" is a song by American group TLC, released as the third single from their debut album, Ooooooohhh... On the TLC Tip (1992). It was released on August 21, 1992, and reached number seven on the Billboard Hot 100, becoming the group's third consecutive top-10 single. A remix to the song, titled "What About Your Friends (Extended Mix)", includes the first ever appearance by the Atlanta hip-hop duo Outkast.

== Composition ==
"What About Your Friends" was written by Dallas Austin and TLC member Lisa "Left Eye" Lopes, and features lead vocals by T-Boz and Chilli. The song samples "Blues & Pants" by James Brown.

== Critical reception ==
Daryl McIntosh from Albumism noted that "What About Your Friends" "calls into question the topic of loyalty and true friendship, making you evaluate the character of those within your inner circle."

== Music video ==
The main performance scenes of the music video for "What About Your Friends" was directed by Lionel C. Martin, and features the girls walking in an alley surrounded by backup dancers, underneath a bridge, on an outside staircase, on an apartment roof, in a slushie bar and wearing graffiti clothes in front of a graffiti-covered wall. Two versions of the video were made: one focuses on more of the performance shots of the girls and scenes of them infiltrating a stylish fashion show, while the other features scenes of a party in a big park where the girls are being very happy, dancing and having fun with their friends and some family members; including a scene of them reprising their roles as hillbillies from the "Ain't 2 Proud 2 Beg" video at the end. Jermaine Dupri makes a cameo appearance.

== Commercial performance ==
The song reached number seven on the Billboard Hot 100, becoming the group's third consecutive top ten single, and reached No. 2 on the Hot R&B Singles chart, behind "Games" by Chuckii Booker. The single was certified gold by the RIAA. In the United Kingdom, "What About Your Friends" peaked at No. 59.

== Charts ==
=== Weekly charts ===
Chart (1992–1993)	Peak position
Australia (ARIA)	79
Canada Top Singles (RPM)	44
Canada Dance/Urban (RPM)	4
Europe (European Dance Radio)	20
Israel (IBA)	33
Netherlands (Dutch Top 40 Tipparade)	8
Netherlands (Single Top 100)	58
New Zealand (Recorded Music NZ)	19
UK Singles (Official Charts)	59
UK Dance (Music Week)	33
US Billboard Hot 100	7
US Dance Singles Sales (Billboard)	5
US Hot R&B/Hip-Hop Songs (Billboard)	2
US Pop Airplay (Billboard)	18
US Rhythmic Airplay (Billboard)	1

=== Year-end charts ===
Chart (1992)	Position
US Billboard Hot 100	88
US Hot R&B/Hip-Hop Songs (Billboard)	67

Chart (1993)	Position
US Billboard Hot 100	62
US Hot R&B/Hip-Hop Songs (Billboard)	72

== Certifications ==
Region	Certification	Certified units/sales
United States (RIAA)	Gold	500,000^{^}
^{^} Shipments figures based on certification alone.

== Release history ==
Region	Date	Format(s)	Label(s)	Ref.
United States	August 21, 1992	12-inch vinyl; CD; cassette	LaFace	
United Kingdom	October 12, 1992	7-inch vinyl; 12-inch vinyl; CD; cassette	LaFace; Arista	
Australia	November 16, 1992	CD; cassette	LaFace	
Japan	November 21, 1992	Mini-CD	LaFace; Arista	
Australia	December 7, 1992	12-inch vinyl	LaFace	
