= Ain't 2 Proud 2 Beg =

1991 single by TLC

Single by TLC

from the album Ooooooohhh... On the TLC Tip
- Released: November 22, 1991
- Recorded: April 1991
- Genre: New jack swing
- Length: 5:37 (album version); 4:10 (single edit)
- Label: LaFace; Arista
- Songwriters: Dallas Austin; Lisa Lopes; Roger Ball; Robert Bell; Ronald Bell; Donald Boyce; George Brown; Malcolm Duncan; Steven Ferrone; Alan Gorrie; Owen McIntyre; Robert "Spike" Mickens; Claydes Smith; Hamish Stuart; Dennis Thomas; Richard Westfield
- Producer: Dallas Austin

TLC singles chronology
"Word to the Badd!!" (1991)	"Ain't 2 Proud 2 Beg" (1991)	"Baby-Baby-Baby" (1992)

Music video
- "Ain't 2 Proud 2 Beg" on YouTube

"Ain't 2 Proud 2 Beg" is the debut single by American girl group TLC, from their debut album, Ooooooohhh... On the TLC Tip (1992). It was released by LaFace Records on November 22, 1991 (promo) and late January 1992 (retail). The song would ultimately peak at number six on the US Billboard Hot 100 and number two on Billboard's Hot R&B/Hip-Hop Singles & Tracks. The single also reached the top 20 in the UK Singles Chart. The song describes the group explaining that they don't mind begging for attention from their significant others. Songwriters Dallas Austin and Lisa 'Left Eye' Lopes received a nomination for the 1993 Grammy Award for Best R&B Song. The song appeared in video games Dance Central 3 and the 2022 reboot of Saints Row.

== Critical reception ==
In a retrospective review, Daryl McIntosh from Albumism remarked that on the song, "the fresh look and unique sound of the southern fried trio exploded with flavor that satisfied every taste bud as Chilli’s sweet soprano contrasted T-Boz’s tangy contralto, and Left Eye’s spicy lyrics and natural charisma brought all of the ingredients together." He added, "Throw in Dallas Austin’s production, and you had the perfect musical gumbo that listeners never imagined could be enjoyed in a single serving." Robert Hilburn from Los Angeles Times wrote, "The title may be borrowed from a ‘60s Motown hit, but the playful, kinetic hip-hop attitude--youthful with a feminist edge--is right to the minute."

== Music video ==
The accompanying music video for "Ain't 2 Proud 2 Beg", filmed and produced in late 1991, features the girls wearing condoms, baggy clothes, and Lisa with a big hat and sunglasses. The video shows the girls singing, dancing and rapping and will occasionally have the girl's nicknames at the bottom of the screen. Some shots feature the group outside with people in the background and then them in front of a white background. In a BET interview, T-Boz and Chilli said they were trying to warm-up to the cameras in this video because it was their first one, and that Lisa was a natural because it was her "big break" and what she had "been waiting for". T-Boz also said amusedly that you can see her playing with her side-burns in the beginning, and Chilli stated it was her least favorite video they did. The end of the video shows the girls in character as hillbillies. The radio edit of the song is used instead of the album version. Their then-manager, Pebbles, also appears at the end of the video.

== Track listings ==
- US 12-inch vinyl (73008-24009-1; Released: 1992)

A: "Ain't 2 Proud 2 Beg" (Smoothed Down Extended Remix) - 5:52
AA: "Ain't 2 Proud 2 Beg" (Album Version) - 5:38
B: "Ain't 2 Proud 2 Beg" (Dallas' Dirt Mix) - 5:52
BB: "Ain't 2 Proud 2 Beg" (Left Eye's "3 Minutes And Counting") - 5:41
BBB: "Ain't 2 Proud 2 Beg" (Rap Version) - 4:51
BBBB: "Ain't 2 Proud 2 Beg" (Instrumental) - 5:37

- UK CD (665 265; Released: 1992)
1. "Ain't 2 Proud 2 Beg" (U.S. 7-inch Edit) - 4:10
2. "Ain't 2 Proud 2 Beg" (Skratch 7-inch Edit) - 4:20
3. "Ain't 2 Proud 2 Beg" (Ben Liebrand 12-inch Club Mix) - 6:20
4. "Ain't 2 Proud 2 Beg" (Smoothed Down Extended Remix) - 5:55
- UK CD (665 265; Released: 1992)
1. "Ain't 2 Proud 2 Beg" (U.S. 7-inch Edit)
2. "Ain't 2 Proud 2 Beg" (Skratch Mix 7-inch Edit)
3. "Ain't 2 Proud 2 Beg" (Smoothed Down Extended Mix)
4. "Ain't 2 Proud 2 Beg" (Ben Liebrand 12-inch Club Mix)
5. "Ain't 2 Proud 2 Beg" (Left Eye's "3 Minutes And Counting")
- UK 12-inch vinyl (615 265; Released: 1992)

A: "Ain't 2 Proud 2 Beg" (Smoothed Down Extended Remix)
AA: "Ain't 2 Proud 2 Beg" (Left Eye's "3 Minutes And Counting")
AAA: "Ain't 2 Proud 2 Beg" (Rap Version)
B: "Ain't 2 Proud 2 Beg" (Ben Liebrand 12-inch Club Mix)
BB: "Ain't 2 Proud 2 Beg" (Ben Liebrand 12-inch Dub Mix)

- German 7-inch vinyl (115 265; Released: 1992)

A: "Ain't 2 Proud 2 Beg" (U.S. 7-inch Edit) - 4:10
B: "Ain't 2 Proud 2 Beg" (Skratch 7-inch Edit) - 4:20

- German 12-inch vinyl (615 265; Released: 1992)

A: "Ain't 2 Proud 2 Beg" (Ben Liebrand 12-inch Club Mix) - 6:20
AA: "Ain't 2 Proud 2 Beg" (Ben Liebrand 12-inch Dub Mix) - 5:44
B: "Ain't 2 Proud 2 Beg" (Smoothed Down Extended Remix) - 5:55

- US CD (73008-24009-2; Released: 2001; Reissue)
1. "Ain't 2 Proud 2 Beg" (Album Version) - 5:39
2. "Ain't 2 Proud 2 Beg" (Smoothed Down Radio Remix) - 4:37
3. "Ain't 2 Proud 2 Beg" (Smoothed Down Extended Remix) - 5:53
4. "Ain't 2 Proud 2 Beg" (Dallas' Dirt Mix) - 5:56
5. "Ain't 2 Proud 2 Beg" (Left Eye's "3 Minutes And Counting") - 5:47
6. "Ain't 2 Proud 2 Beg" (Rap Version) - 4:52

== Sample credits ==
The song uses seven samples. The most notable sample used is a sped-up sample of "School Boy Crush" by Average White Band. This same sample was used on Floetry's "Wanna B Where U R", "Microphone Fiend" by Eric B. & Rakim and Immature's "Watch Me Do My Thing". Immature, Eric B. & Rakim and Floetry also sped up their sample. The song also samples "Jungle Boogie" by Kool & the Gang (several elements), "Escapism" by James Brown (some of Brown's interjections), "Fly, Robin, Fly" by Silver Convention, "Get Me Back on Time, Engine Number 9, Pt. 1" by Wilson Pickett (the drumlines of both "Robin" and "Engine" were combined to make the drumline for "Beg"), "Take Me to the Mardi Gras" by Bob James (some SFX) and "I Want to Take You Higher" by Sly and the Family Stone.

== Charts ==
=== Weekly charts ===
Chart (1992)	Peak position
Australia (ARIA)	28
Canada Dance/Urban (RPM)	3
Europe (Eurochart Hot 100)	53
Europe (European Dance Radio)	6
Israel (Israeli Singles Chart)	21
Netherlands (Dutch Top 40)	25
Netherlands (Single Top 100)	24
New Zealand (Recorded Music NZ)	35
UK Singles (Official Charts)	13
UK Airplay (Music Week)	47
UK Dance (Music Week)	5
UK Club Chart (Music Week)	9
US Billboard Hot 100	6
US Dance Singles Sales (Billboard)	1
US Hot R&B/Hip-Hop Songs (Billboard)	2

=== Year-end charts ===
Chart (1992)	Position
US Billboard Hot 100	36
US Hot R&B Singles (Billboard)	26
US Maxi-Singles Sales (Billboard)	10

== Certifications ==
Region	Certification	Certified units/sales
United States (RIAA)	Platinum	1,000,000^{^}
^{^} Shipments figures based on certification alone.

== Release history ==
Region	Date	Format(s)	Label(s)	Ref.
United States	November 22, 1991	12-inch vinyl; cassette	LaFace	
Australia	April 20, 1992	CD; cassette	LaFace	
United Kingdom	June 8, 1992	7-inch vinyl; 12-inch vinyl; CD; cassette	Arista; LaFace	
Sweden	June 29, 1992	CD	Arista; LaFace	

== See also ==
- N.E. Heartbreak
