= Camille Thurman =

American saxophonist, singer, and composer

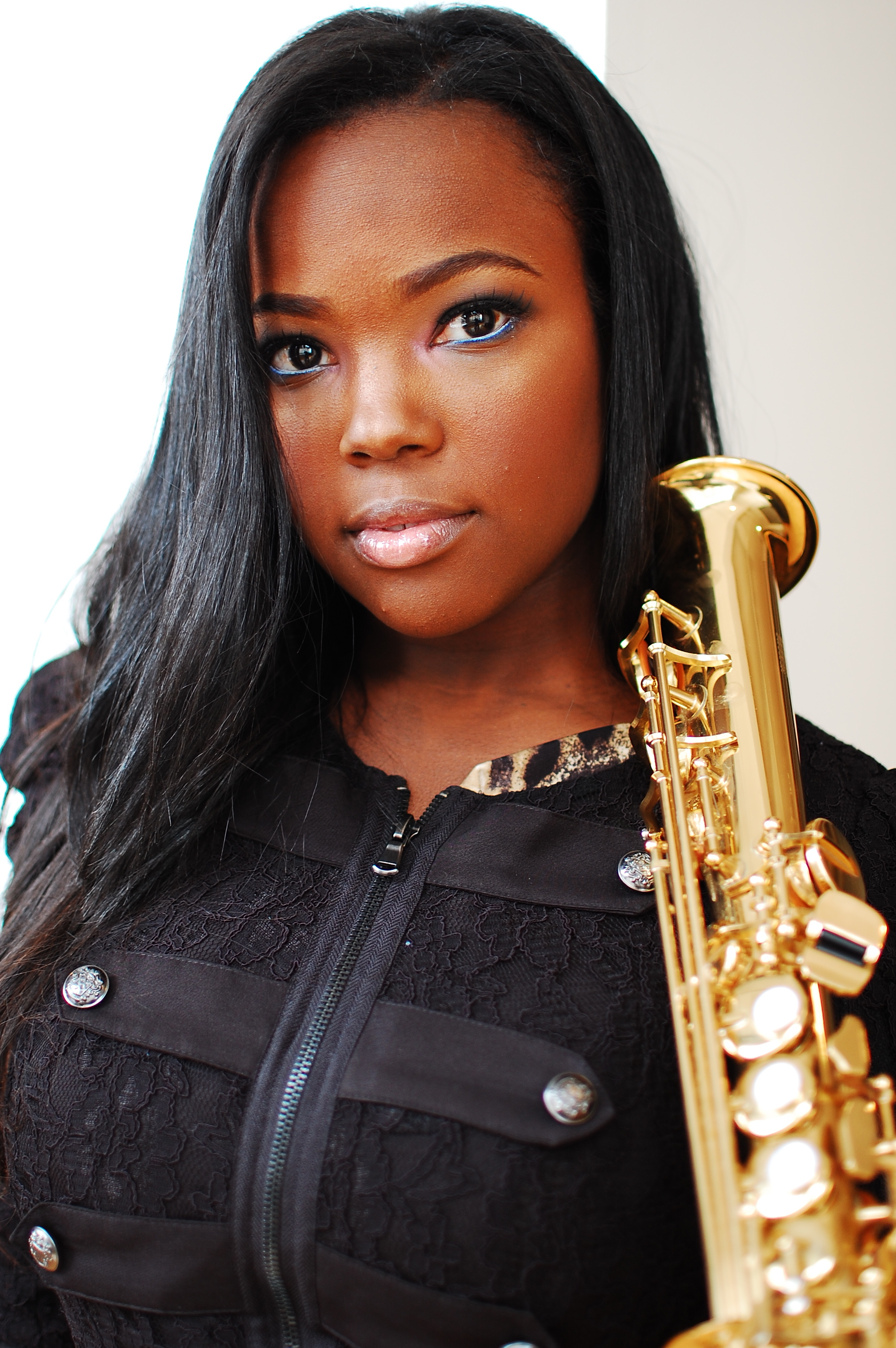
- Camille Thurman in 2013

Background information
- Born: December 22, 1986 (age 39); Queens, New York
- Genre: Jazz
- Occupation: Musician
- Instruments: Saxophone, flute, vocals
- Years active: 2008–present
- Label: Chesky
- Member of: Jazz at Lincoln Center Orchestra
- Website: camillethurmanmusic.com

Camille Thurman (born December 22, 1986) is an American jazz saxophonist, singer, composer, and member of the Jazz at Lincoln Center Orchestra. Her first two albums, released by Chesky Records in 2018 and 2017, peaked at #3 and #25 respectively on the Billboard Jazz Albums Chart. She has performed at the Kennedy Center, and was a runner up for the 2013 Sarah Vaughan International Jazz Vocal Competition.

== Early life ==
Thurman, who is of African American heritage, took up music at a young age, as she grew up in the St. Albans section of Queens, New York, practicing vocals, piano, and flute before attending Fiorello H. LaGuardia High School of Music & Art and the Performing Arts. She first picked up the tenor saxophone, the instrument she is best known for playing, at the age of 15. She went on to earn a bachelor's degree in geological & environmental science from Binghamton University.

== Musical career ==
Thurman moved back to New York City following her graduation, and played with a wide array of jazz musicians, particularly crediting saxophone player Tia Fuller and vocalist/bassist Mimi Jones with helping her in those early years. Thurman went on to place as a finalist in the 2013 Sarah Vaughan International Vocal Competition, garnering significant attention, and leading to her first record deal.

Later in 2013, Thurman released her first album, Origins, on Jones' label, Hot Tone Music. She followed up with her second album on Hot Tone, Spirit Child, in 2014.

Over December 2014 to January 2015 Thurman appeared alongside Charenee Wade, Cyrille Aimée, Allan Harris and an eight-piece band including bassist Mimi Jones in Alex Webb (musician)'s jazz theatre show Cafe Society Swing, at New York's 59E59 Theaters, which received a Critic's Pick from The New York Times.

Thurman later signed to Chesky Records, and released her third album, Inside the Moment, on May 19, 2017, which debuted at #25 on the Billboard Jazz Albums Chart.

Thurman released her fourth album, Waiting for the Sunrise, through Chesky Records on August 24, 2018, and the album debuted at #2 on the Billboard Traditional Jazz Albums Chart.

== Awards and honors ==
- 16th Independent Music Award Nominated - Jazz Song with Vocals "Cherokee"
- 17th Independent Music Award - Jazz Album with Vocals - Waiting for the Sunrise
- 17th Independent Music Award - Jazz Song with Vocals - "The Nearness of You"
- NAACP 50th Image Awards Nominated - Outstanding Jazz Album
