= List of alumni of the Royal Central School of Speech and Drama =

This is a list of notable people who studied at the Royal Central School of Speech and Drama in London.

== A ==
- Joss Ackland
- Rodney Ackland
- Razaaq Adoti
- Naana Agyei-Ampadu
- Riz Ahmed
- Hajaz Akram
- Wendy Allnutt
- Joe Alwyn
- Katie Amess
- Gene Anderson
- Nonso Anozie
- Peggy Ashcroft
- Juliet Aubrey

== B ==
- Paul Bailey
- Rae Baker
- Patrick Baladi
- Jill Balcon
- Ben Baldwin
- Elliot Barnes-Worrell
- Anthony Bate
- Gina Beck
- Michael Beck
- Elizabeth Bell
- Lynda Bellingham
- John Bennett
- Joseph A. Bennett
- Emily Bevan
- Haley Bishop
- Dorothy Black
- Jasmine Blackborow
- Christopher Blake
- Claudie Blakley
- Claire Bloom
- Domini Blythe
- Catherine Bohart
- Adebayo Bolaji
- James Bolam
- Tony Boncza
- Gary Bond
- Philip Bond
- Bette Bourne
- Zoe Boyle
- Betsy Brantley
- James Bree
- Jeremy Brett
- Sally Bretton
- Tim Brinton
- Tom Brittney
- Fern Britton
- Dorothy Bromiley
- Ben Browder
- Ian Brown
- Francesca Buller
- Alex Bulmer
- Jessie Burton
- Michelle Butterly
- Georgia Byng

== C ==
- Michael Cacoyannis
- Selina Cadell
- Phyllis Calvert
- Gavin Campbell
- Anita Carey
- Paul Chahidi
- Peter Chelsom
- Oliver Chris
- Julie Christie
- Jeremy Clyde
- Lucy Cohu
- Maurice Colbourne
- Pauline Collins
- Kenneth Connor
- Giles Cooper
- Shane Cortese
- George Coulouris
- Claire Cox
- Wendy Craig
- Heather Craney
- Anna Cropper
- Tim Crouch
- Lizzie Cundy

== D ==
- Ryan Davies
- Peter Davison
- Gregory de Polnay
- Jeffery Dench
- Judi Dench
- Sandra Dickinson
- Shaun Dingwall
- Sebastian Doggart
- Amanda Donohoe
- Katharine Doré
- Deelee Dubé
- Lindsay Duncan
- Lord David Dundas
- Hilary Dwyer

== E ==
- Christopher Eccleston
- Jennifer Ehle
- Janet Ellis
- Michael Elphick
- Polly Elwes
- Barry Evans
- Monica Evans
- Robert Evans
- Rupert Everett
- Clive Exton

== F ==
- Lourdes Faberes
- James Farrar
- James Faulkner
- Abi Finley
- Jonathan Firth
- Carrie Fisher
- Alison Fiske
- Mark Fleischmann
- Jerome Flynn
- Barry Foster
- Michael Fox
- William Fox
- James Frain
- Martin Freeman
- Dawn French
- Sonia Friedman

== G ==
- Gael García Bernal
- Alexia Gardner
- Andrew Garfield
- Chris Gascoyne
- Richard Gibson
- Philip Glenister
- Jamie Glover
- Nickolas Grace
- Michael Grandage
- Deborah Grant
- Patricia Greene
- Adrian Greensmith
- Rosamund Greenwood
- Selina Griffiths
- Paul Groothuis
- Hermione Gulliford
- Jack Gwillim

== H ==
- Kenneth Haigh
- Suzanna Hamilton
- Jake Harders
- Ben Hardy
- David Hargreaves
- Kit Harington
- Jared Harris
- Ryan Hawley
- Karen Hayley
- Cherry Healey
- Ian Hendry
- Jennifer Hennessy
- Kate Hennig
- Marie Herbert
- Ian Hogg
- David Horovitch
- William Houston
- Colin Hurley

== IJ ==
- Martins Imhangbe
- Polly Irvin
- Jason Isaacs
- Ana Inés Jabares-Pita
- Ann Jellicoe
- Hannah John-Kamen
- Caroline John
- Cush Jumbo

== K ==
- Rose Keegan
- Pat Keen
- Jane Kelly
- Jeremy Kemp
- Jonathan Kent
- Annette Kerr
- Pat Keysell
- Delena Kidd
- Geoffrey Kirkness
- Jules Knight
- Will Knightley
- Alice Krige

== L ==
- Elise Lamb
- Paula Lane
- John Laurie
- Roger Leach
- Helen Lederer
- Anna Lee
- Olivia Lee
- Alison Leggatt
- David Leland
- Rebecca Lenkiewicz
- Matthew Jay Lewis
- Gabriella Licudi
- Ariel Lin
- Jennie Linden
- Rebecca Lock
- Robert Longden
- Jon Lord
- Cherie Lunghi
- John Lynch
- Molly Lynch
- Susan Lynch
- David Lyon

== M ==
- Angus Macfadyen
- Vivian MacKerrell
- Anna Mackmin
- Anna Madeley
- Tamzin Malleson
- Sarah Manners
- Amy Manson
- Joseph Marcell
- Freddy Marks
- Eleanor Matsuura
- Melina Matthews
- Irene Mawer
- Richard Mayes
- Colin McCormack
- Andrew McCulloch
- Virginia McKenna
- Neil McPherson
- Siobhan McSweeney
- Leonie Mellinger
- Jane Menelaus
- Camille Mitchell
- Helen Montagu
- Lucy Montgomery
- Stephen Moore
- Richard Morant
- Diana Morgan
- Joseph Morgan
- Adam Morris
- Alexander Morton
- Aoife Mulholland
- Patrick Mynhardt

== N ==
- Robin Nedwell
- David Neilson
- Kate Nelligan
- James Nesbitt
- Hannah New
- Jonathan Newth
- David Nicholls
- Phoebe Nicholls
- Rosemary Nicols
- Graham Norton

== O ==
- Tracy-Ann Oberman
- Ita O'Brien
- David O'Hara
- Patrick O'Kane
- Laurence Olivier
- James Ottaway
- Indra Ové
- John Owen-Jones
- David Oxley

== PQ ==
- Rachel Parris
- Richard Pasco
- Tom Payne
- Tessa Peake-Jones
- Neil Pearson
- Stjepan Perić
- Mouche Phillips
- Harold Pinter
- Morgane Polanski
- Ben Price
- James Purefoy
- Moira Quirk

== R ==
- Anthony Read
- Lynn Redgrave
- Vanessa Redgrave
- Enn Reitel
- Emma Relph
- Katrina Retallick
- Julian Rhind-Tutt
- Natasha Richardson
- Michael Ripper
- Linus Roache
- Bruce Robinson
- Tony Robinson
- Patsy Rodenburg
- Rebecca Root
- George Rose
- Vanessa Rosenthal
- Finn Ross
- Dominic Rowan
- Julia Roy
- Catherine Russell

== S ==
- Pamela Salem
- Julian Sands
- Jennifer Saunders
- Lucy Scott
- Kristin Scott Thomas
- Heather Sears
- Andy Secombe
- German Segal
- Nicholas Selby
- Rufus Sewell
- Jack Shepherd
- Josette Simon
- Susan Skipper
- Mina Smallman
- Liz Solari
- Karla Souza
- Claire Stansfield
- Emma Stansfield
- Carol Starks
- Nathan Stewart-Jarrett
- Sara Stewart

== T ==
- Zoë Tapper
- Catherine Tate
- Mandala Tayde
- Beryl Te Wiata
- Victoria Tennant
- Karl Theobald
- Siân Thomas
- Kim Thomson
- Christopher Timothy
- Abi Titmuss
- Ann Todd
- Stephen Tompkinson
- Kathleen Turner

== UV ==
- Mary Ure
- John Van Eyssen
- Tasha de Vasconcelos
- Paul Venables
- Wanda Ventham
- Deepak Verma
- Richard Vernon
- Charlie Vickers

== WXYZ ==
- Julian Wadham
- Gok Wan
- Zoë Wanamaker
- Lalla Ward
- Michael Ward
- Deborah Warner
- Timothy Watson
- Kevin Whately
- Frances White
- Debbie Wilcox, Baroness Wilcox of Newport
- Finty Williams
- Julia Wilson-Dickson
- Mary Wimbush
- Frank Windsor
- Duncan Wisbey
- Susan Wooldridge
- Irene Worth
- Angus Wright
- Stewart Wright
- Alexis Zegerman
