= Alex Webb (musician) =

British songwriter and musician

Alex Webb (born 1961) is a British songwriter and musician and former journalist. Educated at Manchester University and the University of Connecticut, he is the brother of the late guitarist and composer Nick Webb (the founder of Acoustic Alchemy), the nephew of actress Sylvia Syms and cousin of actress Beatie Edney.

== Musical career ==
Since the 1980s, Webb has played with numerous jazz, pop and reggae groups including Manchester's Carmel and Harlem Spirit. As a songwriter, he has collaborated with many UK jazz musicians and vocalists, including Ayanna Witter-Johnson, Tammy Weis, Nicola Emmanuelle, Jo Harrop, and Alexander Stewart. His songs have been recorded by Liane Carroll, China Moses, Alexia Gardner, Mina Agossi, David McAlmont and Alexander Stewart, among others. Musicians he has performed live with include Gary Crosby, Guy Barker, Danny Moss, Art Themen, Denys Baptiste, Nathaniel Facey, Gwyneth Herbert and China Moses. He also performed as a percussionist in the London School of Samba for a period in the early 1990s.

Since 2008, he has also directed and performed in a number of music and spoken word productions, including the jazz history shows Strayhorn the Songwriter (about composer/arranger Billy Strayhorn) in 2010 and Jazz at Cafe Society (about the 1940s New York club) in 2011 – both commissioned by the London Jazz Festival. Jazz at Cafe Society had a successful run at London's Tricycle Theatre in July 2012 and was repeated at London's Leicester Square Theatre as Cafe Society Swing in December 2013 and June 2014. In November 2013, Webb created a narrated jazz show based on two years in the life of jazz musician Charlie Parker called Charlie Parker on Dial which played at the London Jazz Festival and subsequently at London's Ronnie Scott's Jazz Club.

Cafe Society Swing ran for three weeks at New York's 59E59 Theaters over Christmas 2014 with a US cast including vocalists Charenee Wade, Cyrille Aimée, Allan Harris and an eight-piece band including saxophonist Camille Thurman and bassist Mimi Jones, with Webb MD-ing from the piano chair. It attracted positive reviews including a Critic's Pick from The New York Times. The show has since toured the UK in a concert format, fronted by vocalists Vimala Rowe and Ciyo Brown. It also ran for two weeks at Theatre Royal Stratford East in June 2018 with China Moses and Judi Jackson joining Vimala Rowe and Ciyo Brown in singing roles.

In June 2016, Webb released the CD Call Me Lucky on Splash Point Records under the name Alex Webb & The Copasetics, which contained 13 original songs sung by 11 different jazz vocalists, including Allan Harris, David McAlmont, Alexia Gardner, and some of his previous collaborators such as Liane Carroll and China Moses. The album received universally warm reviews.

During mid 2017, Webb premiered a musical he had co-composed with Camilla Beeput at the Norfolk & Norwich, Bath and Aldeburgh festivals. Stormy: the Life of Lena Horne was a one-woman show, played by Beeput, that told the story of the African-American singer, actress and civil rights activist through Beeput's script and a series of Beeput-Webb compositions. The show received excellent reviews, including from The Times, which called it "a bravura one-woman display from the charismatic Camilla Beeput". Since 2018, Webb has, with saxophonist Tony Kofi, co-led a group celebrating the music of Cannonball Adderley and created a words-and-music project based on the music of Billie Holiday.

In November 2019, Webb released an album of original songs and unusual cover versions with David McAlmont – The Last Bohemians by McAlmont & Webb (Copasetic/Lateralize) – which received highly positive reviews and, in March 2020, Webb was featured on Tony Kofi's Another Kind of Soul (Last Music Co), a live album documenting the band's Cannonball Adderley project.

In January 2022, Webb released another album, British Standard Time, on Lateralize Records which featured vocalists Jo Harrop, Carroll Thompson, Tony Momrelle and Luca Manning performing songs by British songwriters and composers. The album was well-received by critics, was a Jazz FM Album of The Week and made an editor's choice by Jazzwise magazine. In November 2024, Webb released an album with vocalist Ineza, Women's Words, Sisters' Stories, described by Jazzwise magazine as ‘Immensely enjoyable … effortlessly combines melodic beauty with emotional depth’ (****). The album documents the show which Ineza and he were touring, which showcases female songwriters and composers. In 2024, Webb also put together a seven-piece live tribute to Duke Ellington called The Pocket Ellington, featuring significant UK players including Alan Barnes, Tony Kofi and Dave Green.

== Other work ==
Webb has worked at the BBC World Service, BBC News Online and BBC Radio 3. At Radio 3, he co-ordinated the BBC Radio 3 Awards for World Music and, with BBC Radio 2, the BBC Jazz Awards. He has also worked in music publishing (at the UK Music Publishers Association) and at the music venues Band on the Wall in Manchester (1983–1986), Peter Ind's Bass Clef in London (1988–1989) and the Barbican Centre (2007–2011). He has also worked a freelance journalist for many publications including The Guardian, The Independent, Straight No Chaser and New Statesman; from 1996 to 1997, he was a political journalist and researcher for Alastair Stewart's Sunday Programme on GMTV. He is a member of the Musicians' Union (UK), PRS for Music and Phonographic Performance Limited and has spent some time as a university lecturer in music and events management.
