= Charenee Wade =

American jazz musician

- Education: Manhattan School of Music
- Occupations: vocalist, educator
- Musical career
- Website: www.chareneewade.com

Charenee Wade is an American jazz, soul and R&B singer, composer, arranger, improvisor, and educator.

== Early life ==
Charenee Wade was born and raised in Brooklyn, New York, United States and began singing at the age of 12. She participated in the Betty Carter's Jazz Ahead Program performing her original music at the Kennedy Center in Washington, D.C. She participated in the Dianne Reeves Artists Workshop at Carnegie Hall in New York City. Wade was selected for the JAS Academy Summer Sessions as a young artist in 2007-2009 which was directed by Christian McBride. Her earlier influences in music was Sarah Vaughan and Betty Carter.

== Career ==
Wade is an international and national performer. She is well studied in jazz and classical music. She has performed at the Jazz Gallery, Zinc Bar, Lincoln Center's Dizzy Coca-Cola's, Smalls in New York City. Her debut album was Love Walked In which was released in 2010. Wade has been a featured singer in many trios, big bands, etc., being featured on the Grammy nominated Big Band Urban Folktales and double Grammy nominated Multiverse CDs with the Bobby Sanabria Multiverse Big Band, to a 100-piece Jazz Philharmonic Orchestra.

She has studied with Carmen Lundy, Peter Eldridge, Bob Stewart, Miles Griffith, Lenora Zenzailai Helm, Luciana Souza, Cecil Bridgewater, Pamela Baskin-Watson.

Wade has performed at Festival du Riou, the Montreaux Jazz Festival, and the Ascona New Orleans Jazz Festival. She opened for Herbie Hancock at the Clifford Brown Jazz Festival in 2003. She was on tour with the Oleg Butman Trio performing at various venues in Moscow, and the Province Jazz Festival in Orenburg. In 2004, she performed with Rufus Reid the bassist-composer.

Her second album is a tribute to the work of Gil Scott-Heron, and is titled the “Offering: The Music of Gil Scott-Heron & Brian Jackson”. It was released on the Motéma Music label. The album features Christian McBride, Lakecia Benjamin, Dave Stryker, Stefon Harris, Marcus Miller, Malcolm-Jamal Warner.

She has been a guest vocalist on album releases by Tia Fuller, Eric Reed, and the Eyal Vilner Big Band.

2014 - December to January 2015 - Starred alongside Cyrille Aimée, Allan Harris and an eight-piece band including saxophonist Camille Thurman and bassist Mimi Jones in Alex Webb (musician)'s jazz theatre show Cafe Society Swing at New York's 59E59 Theaters, attracting positive reviews including a Critic's Pick from the New York Times.

2015 - October - Special guest vocalist with the Rob Garcia Sextet tribute to the music of Max Roach.

2017 - August - Charlie Parker Jazz Festival with the Lee Konitz Quartet / Terri Lyne Carrington and Social Science / Louis Hayes / Charenee Wade.

Artists who have performed with her band & artists she has performed with; Brandon McCune, Paul Beaudry, Alvester Garnett, Lakecia Benjamin, Nikara Warren, Brandon McCune, bassist Lonnie Plaxico, Alvester Garnett, Brianna Thomas, Catherine Russell.

2017 - October - Wade in Shanghai, China with Camille Thurman Group at the Jazz at Lincoln Center in Shanghai with pianist and composer Helen Sung.

2017 - October - Wade Wade and Camille Thurman Quartet, and with vocalist Sachal Vasandani, Jazz at Lincoln Center Shanghai at The Central in the Bund, Shanghai, China.

== Teaching ==
She teaches workshops and music clinics, and has been a talent judge in music competitions. She is a professor at the Aaron Copland School of Music in New York, and teaches with the Jazzmobile workshop program. She also teaches teenagers at New Jersey Performing Arts Center. She says as an educator, "The goal is to help each individual to acquire the essential skills needed to become well-rounded musician, while nurturing their passion for music. I strongly believe that music has the power to change lives and through self expression, can bring positivity to communities for the betterment of society and culture".

She has also taught at the New Orleans Louis "Satchmo" Armstrong Jazz Camp.

== Awards ==
She was first runner up in the 2010 Thelonious Monk competition.

== Discography ==
- 2011 - Love Walked In (Self-Produced)
- 2015 - The Offering : The Music of Gil Scott-Heron & Brian Jackson. On the Motéma Music label. The album features Christian McBride, Lakecia Benjamin, Stefon Harris, Marcus Miller, Malcolm-Jamal Warner.
