= Kyle Roussel =

American musician (born 1988)

- Born: April 26, 1988 (age 38); Boutte, Louisiana, U.S.
- Genres: Jazz, Soul, Gospel, Funk, Soul, R&B, Pop, Hip-Hop, Brass Band, Classical, Rock, Dance, EDM
- Occupations: Musician, record producer
- Instruments: Piano, Organ, Keyboards, and Drums
- Years active: 2006–present
- Website: kylearoussel.com

Kyle Roussel (born April 26, 1988) is an American musician, producer, composer, arranger, engineer, bandleader, educator, and actor from New Orleans, Louisiana. He is known as one of New Orleans’ most prominent pianists and has worked with a number of high-profile New Orleans acts.

== Early life, education, and influences ==
Roussel was raised in Boutte, Louisiana, a small town on the outskirts of New Orleans, Louisiana. From a young age, he began picking out songs on his sister's toy keyboard by ear until Frozine Francis, a proper piano teacher married to his uncle's father (and mother of popular movie composer Elvin Ross), started teaching him. He began studying classical piano with her at age 9, and began playing in churches at age 12, including a number of denominations including Catholic, Methodist, AME, CME, Pentecostal, Baptist, COGIC, Full Gospel, and non-denominational. He regularly participated in classical piano competitions on weekends and played at multiple churches on Sundays until one of his church members recommended that he audition for New Orleans Center for Creative Arts, where he was first introduced to jazz. There he was mentored by the late Alvin Batiste, along with Michael Pellera, Mike Rihner, and Chris Severin. After graduating high school in 2006, he was offered a scholarship to attend Berklee School of Music but decided to attend the University of New Orleans on a full paid scholarship.

== Music career ==
=== Early career ===
Roussel attended Hahnville High School and was a 2006 graduate of the New Orleans Center for Creative Arts (NOCCA). He's also an alumnus of The University of New Orleans with a degree in Jazz Studies, where he studied with Victor Atkins, Steve Masakowski, Ed Petersen, and Brian Seeger. While still in college, he began to work with Delfeayo Marsalis who introduced him to Ellis Marsalis Jr., who instructed Roussel privately despite having already technically retired from teaching. Roussel cites James Booker, Professor Longhair, Stevie Wonder, Allen Toussaint, Dr. John, and Henry Butler as some of his primary influences.

=== As a touring musician ===
Roussel's career as a touring musician started with The Headhunters and Glen David Andrews, followed shortly thereafter with stints with the Dirty Dozen Brass Band, Preservation Hall Jazz Band, and many others. His touring has spanned the entire continental United States and over 40 countries worldwide. He has performed on stage with many notable artists such as Jon Batiste, Ziggy Modeliste, The Head and the Heart, My Morning Jacket, Arcade Fire, Dave Matthews Band, Corrine Bailey Rae, Chance the Rapper, The Revivalists, Nathaniel Rateliff and the Night Sweats, Hurray for the Riff Raff, José James, Dave Grohl, PJ Morton, Jimmy Buffett, Shovels & Rope, Robert Plant, Ivan Neville, Jupiter & Okwess, Pete Townshend, Amos Lee, Beck, Amanda Shaw, Trombone Shorty, Mannie Fresh, Cyril Neville, Robert Randolph of Robert Randolph and the Family Band, Allison Russell, Gary Clark Jr., George Porter Jr., Boyfriend (musician), Big Freedia, Pell, and Lauren Daigle.

Roussel's career has seen him perform at festivals such as the Coachella Valley Music and Arts Festival, Bonnaroo Music and Arts Festival, Electric Forest, Fuji Rock Festival, Lollapalooza, Outside Lands (festival), Austin City Limits Music Festival, Glastonbury Festival, Pitchfork Music Festival, Hangout Music Festival, Newport Folk Festival, Newport Jazz Festival, Summerfest, South by Southwest, Rolling Loud, Telluride Jazz Festival, and Umbria Jazz Festival. He's also played in popular venues such as Madison Square Garden, Preservation Hall, Carnegie Hall, Lincoln Center, Red Rocks Amphitheatre, The Gorge Amphitheatre, Hollywood Bowl, The Greek Theatre, Walt Disney Concert Hall, The Fillmore, The O2, and Blue Note Tokyo. As a culture bearer, he often appears multiple times at the New Orleans Jazz & Heritage Festival, including on his birthday in 2025 where he "thrilled the WWOZ Jazz Tent crowd."

In 2024, Steinway & Sons announced an endorsement and partnership with Roussel

=== As a producer and studio musician ===
As a session musician, Roussel has worked with artists such as Irma Thomas, Tyler Perry, Ludwig Göransson, The Headhunters, Terence Blanchard, Preservation Hall Jazz Band, John Boutté, Donald Harrison, Jr., Herlin Riley, Victor Goines, Glen David Andrews, Roland Guerin, Khris Royal, Ivan Neville, George Porter Jr., Jamison Ross, Cedric Burnside, PJ Morton, Big Freedia, The Soul Rebels, Curren$y, Mannie Fresh, Quiana Lynell.

As a producer, Roussel has produced records for Shango[BUNMI] Durotimi, Roussel Maajon, and Quiana Lynell.

=== Solo projects ===
Roussel's first album as a leader (Rookie of the Year) was released in 2014, from which he cites influences including Jazz, Funk, Rock, Classical, New Orleans music, and Electronic elements. The album features Shannon Powell, Weedie Braimah, Bill Summers, Alvin Ford, Alexey Marti, Roland Guerin, DJ Raymond, and Darryl McCoy Jr.

His second album as a leader (NOLA à la Mode) was released in 2023 in a solo piano format featuring songs by New Orleans musicians James Booker, Professor Longhair, Allen Toussaint, Dr. John, Jelly Roll Morton, and Harold Battiste along with a handful of original compositions.

Roussel's third album, Church of New Orleans, was released on January 24, 2025, and features special guests such as Irma Thomas, Ivan Neville, Preservation Hall Jazz Band, and John Boutte. The following day, he premiered the album in the historic New Orleans venue Tipitina's alongside a "star-studded" lineup of guest artists. The album was nominated for a Grammy Award for Best Regional Roots Music Album at the 2026 Grammys.

== Acting career ==
Roussel appeared as an actor with a major role in the AMC series Interview with the Vampire as Jelly Roll Morton, and has also appeared in other major motion pictures such as Black or White, Girls Trip, One Night in Miami..., and Music Pictures: New Orleans.

== Awards and nominations ==
| Year | Nominee / work | Category | Award | Result |
|---|---|---|---|---|
| 2025 | Church of New Orleans | Best Regional Roots Album | Grammy Awards | Nominated |

== Discography ==
=== Personal projects ===
- Rookie of the Year (2014)
- Nola Á La Mode (2023)
- Church of New Orleans (2024)

=== Complete discography ===
- The Headhunters – Platinum (Owl Studios, 2011)
- Khris Royal and Dark Matter – Khris Royal and Dark Matter (Independent, 2011)
- Glen David Andrews – Live at the Three Muses (Louisiana Red Hot Records, 2012)
- Mainline Brass Band – Mainline Brass Band (Independent, 2012)
- Gast Waltzing – Jazzed Up in New Orleans (WPR Jazz, 2013)
- Cedric Burnside Project – He Me When I Say (Independent, 2013)
- Lena Prima – Starting Something (Independent, 2014)
- Michaela Harrison – Listen to the Music (Independent, 2014)
- Denise Gordon – Sunday’s Service (Independent, 2014)
- Kyle Roussel – Rookie of the Year (Independent, 2014)
- Terence Blanchard – Black or White Soundtrack (Relativity Music Group, 2015)
- Pastor Dale Jay Sanders – It Had to be Him (Independent, 2015)
- Ana Popovic – Trilogy, Vol. 3 (ArtisteXclusive Records, 2016)
- Delfeayo Marsalis and the Uptown Jazz Orchestra – Make America Great Again! (Troubadour Jass, 2016)
- Khari Allen Lee and The New Creative Collective – A New Earth (Independent, 2016)
- The Preservation Hall Jazz Band – So It Is (Sub Pop Records, 2017)
- Roderick Paulin – Slow but Steady (Independent, 2017)
- Haruka Kikuchi – Japan: New Orleans Collection Series Vol. 4 (Independent, 2017)
- Uncle Nef – Blues (Ropeadope, 2017)
- The Preservation Hall Jazz Band – Run Stop & Drop! (Sony Music, 2017)
- Brian Fallon – Sleepwalkers (Island Records, 2018)
- Uncle Nef – Love Songs (Ropeadope, 2019)
- The Preservation Hall Jazz Band – A Tuba to Cuba Soundtrack (Sub Pop Records, 2019)
- The Soul Rebels – Poetry In Motion (Mack Avenue Records, 2019)
- Irma Thomas, Mannie Fresh, Curren$y, Preservation Hall Jazz Band – Offline Playlist (Sub Pop Records, 2019)
- PJ Morton, Big Freedia, Boyfriend – Preservation Hall Jazz Band Holiday Jukebox (Sub Pop Records, 2019)
- Delfeayo Marsalis and the Uptown Jazz Orchestra – Jazz Party (Troubadour Jass, 2020)
- Haruka Kikuchi – Japan: New Orleans Collection Series (Independent, 2020)
- Ingrid Lucia – Wanderlust (Independent, 2020)
- Dominic Minix – Try Again (Independent, 2020)
- Irma Thomas – Love is the Foundation (Newvelle Records, 2020)
- Uncle Nef – Empty Room (Guava Records, 2021)
- Shangobunmi Durotimi – Beaming Out (Roussel Records, 2021)
- Tyler Perry – A Jazzman’s Blues Soundtrack (Sony Music, 2022)
- The Preservation Hall Jazz Band – Holiday (Sub Pop Records, 2022)
- Delfeayo Marsalis and the Uptown Jazz Orchestra – Uptown on Mardi Gras Day (Troubadour Jass, 2023)
- Kyle Roussel – Nola à la Mode (Roussel Records, 2023)
- Roussel Maajon – Roussel Maajon (Independent, 2023)
- The Headhunters – Live from Brooklyn Bowl (Ropeadope, 2023)
- Stephen Walker – Midnight Cocktails (Independent, 2023)
- Sean Ardoin – Mosaic (Zydekool Records, 2023)
- Quiana Lynell – Pillow Talk (Q Sound, 2023)
- Branford Marsalis – Rustin Soundtrack (Netflix Music, 2023)
- Terence Blanchard – Music from Tiana’s Bayou Adventure (Walt Disney Records, 2024)
- Delfeayo Marsalis and the Uptown Jazz Orchestra – Crescent City Jewels (Troubadour Jass, 2024)
- The Headhunters – The Stunt Man (Ropeadope, 2024)
- Kyle Roussel – Church of New Orleans (Tiger Turn, 2025)
- Alune Wade – New African Orleans (Enja Yellowbird, 2025)
