= Inside the Moment =

Live album by Camille Thurman
- Released: May 19, 2017
- Venue: Rockwood Music Hall
- Genre: Jazz
- Length: 49:16
- Label: Chesky
- Producer: David Chesky

Camille Thurman chronology
Origins (2014)	Inside the Moment (2017)	Waiting for the Sunrise (2018)

Inside the Moment is the third album by American jazz vocalist and saxophone player Camille Thurman. It debuted at No. 25 on the Billboard Jazz Albums Chart after being released by Chesky Records on May 19, 2017. The album was recorded live at the Rockwood Music Hall on February 19, 2017. The track "Cherokee" was nominated for an Independent Music Award.

== Track listing ==
1. "The Night Has a Thousand Eyes" – 7:21
2. "Sassy's Blues" – 7:40
3. "Road Song" – 6:13
4. "Detour Ahead" – 7:43
5. "Nefertiti" – 7:43
6. "A Flower Is a Lovesome Thing" – 7:42
7. "Cherokee" – 4:54

== Personnel ==
- Camille Thurman - Vocals, Tenor Saxophone
- Ben Allison - Bass
- Mark Whitfield - Guitar
- Billy Drummond - Drums
- Jeremy Pelt - Trumpet
- David Chesky - Producer
- Norman Chesky - Producer
- Nicholas Prout - Recording, Editing, Mastering
- Mor Mezrich - Second Engineer
- Janelle Costa - Assistant Engineer
