= Laurin Talese =

American jazz singer

- Origin: Cleveland, Ohio
- Genres: Jazz, Traditional Pop, Folk, Soul
- Occupations: Actor, Composer, Lyricist, Vocalist
- Website: www.laurintalese.com

Laurin Talese is an American vocalist and composer. Her 2016 album Gorgeous Chaos peaked at 16 of the Billboard magazine's Traditional Jazz Album charts. She has performed and recorded with musicians such as Adam Blackstone, Christian McBride, Robert Glasper, Gregory Porter, and Patti Labelle.

== Early life ==
Laurin Talese was born and raised in Cleveland, Ohio, United States. At 14, Talese received a scholarship to study classical voice at the Cleveland Institute of Music under the instruction of A. Grace Lee Mims. She left her native Cleveland for the University of the Arts, in Philadelphia, where she majored in vocal performance and graduated in 2004.

== Music career ==
Her debut album, Gorgeous Chaos, was released in 2016 and charted at 14 on Billboard. In 2018, Talese won the Sarah Vaughan International Jazz Vocal Competition. The following year she made her debut at the Newport Jazz Festival. In 2019, Talese represented the United States as a cultural ambassador with American Music Abroad – an initiative of the U.S. Department of State's Bureau of Educational and Cultural Affairs. In 2020, Talese was awarded the New Jazz Works grant funded by the Doris Duke Charitable Foundation.

In a 2019 interview, Talese cited singers Sarah Vaughan and Nancy Wilson as musical influences.

== Discography ==
- 2016: Gorgeous Chaos (CD Baby)
