= Veracruzana University =

Mexican university

- Universidad Veracruzana
- Motto: Art, Science, Light
- Type: State
- Established: September 11, 1944
- Rector: Martín Gerardo Aguilar Sánchez
- Faculty: 6,085
- Undergraduates: 73,273 (2006-2007)
- Location: Xalapa, Veracruz, Mexico
- Mascots: Luzio and Lis
- Website: uv.mx

Location: Xalapa, Veracruz, Mexico

Veracruzana University (Spanish: Universidad Veracruzana) is a public autonomous university located in the Mexican state of Veracruz, established in 1944.

With 58,247 students, it is the university with the most students in the state of Veracruz.

Its academic organization is a structure based on academic areas, schools, education programs and research institutes. Because of geographic dispersion, academic activities are coordinated by the Academic Secretariat and four Vice-Rector's Offices. General Directions of the academic areas: Arts, Biology and Agricultural Sciences, Health Sciences, Economics and Business Administration, Liberal Arts and Technical coordinate as well each school and educational programs. The Department of Research coordinates the plans and activities of the research institutes, and the Direction of Art Dissemination operates the artistic groups and the cultural activities programs.

== History ==
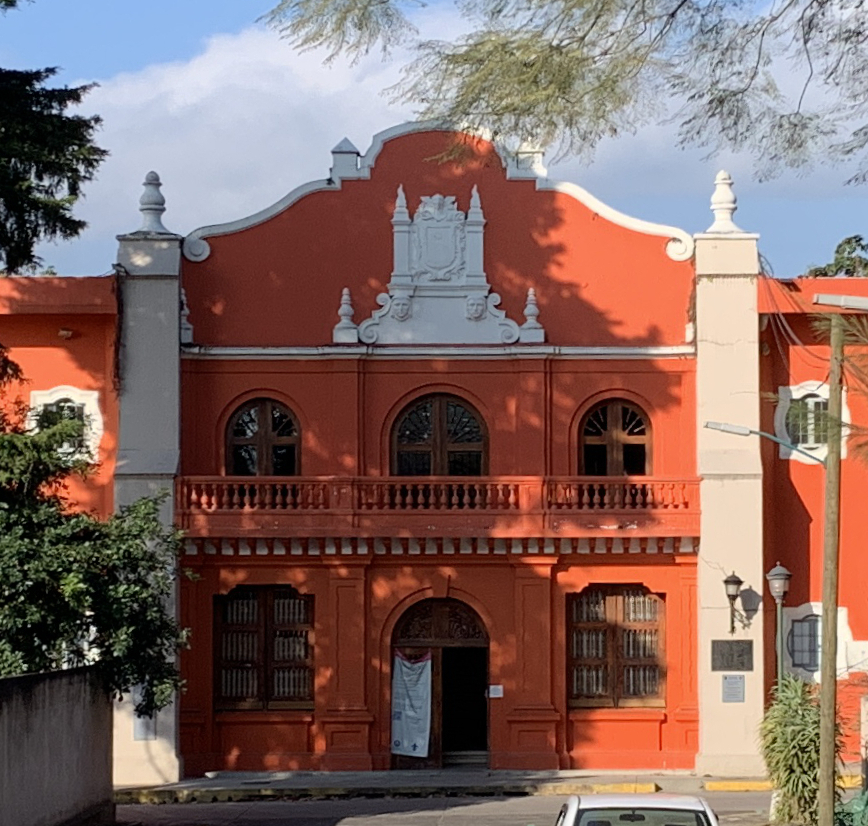
Department of Statistics and Informatics.

The University of Veracruz was formally established on September 11, 1944. Its foundation was the consolidation of the colleges of higher education in the region. It continued the activities of existing middle and high schools along with nursing and midwifery academies from Orizaba, Xalapa and Veracruz. Immediately after, the Law School, the School of Fine Arts, the Archaeology Department, the Superior School of Music and the university radio station, XEXB, were founded. The main campus is in Xalapa.

During the 1950s, the university consolidated and grew: New faculties were founded, new programs were developed and new high schools were created, not only in Xalapa but also in Veracruz and Orizaba. This did not stop until 1968 when secondary education was separated from the Universidad Veracruzana by decree.

The institution's growth and expansion continued in the 1970s, as occurred for other higher education institutions (HEI) in the country. The regionalization of the university was consolidated, more schools were created and the first graduate programs were developed. Research activities fostered the creation of new institutes and the Gynecology and Obstetrics Hospital. In addition, the arts were boosted when art groups were created, giving recognition to the university.

In the next decade, expansion and growing of the different academic entities decreased, new academic plans and programs were approved.

In the '90s, the Universidad Veracruzana faced new challenges reflecting changing social, economic, and political conditions, and dealing with international competition and the deficiency of financial aid, all of which made public universities reconsider their academic organizational structure. The educational development plan was based upon the General Development Plan 1997-2005.2 In this context, the institution entered an innovation process with the Programa de Consolidación y Proyección Hacia el Siglo XXI, 1997-2003 (Consolidation and Projection towards the 21st Century program, 1997-2001).3 In 1997, the state government recognized the right of the institution to have a new social and legal status and awarded the institution with autonomy. The same year, Doctor Víctor Arredondo became the university's president.

Finances came to a head in 2016, when in February it was announced that legal action would be taken against the state administration to claim funding it was entitled to. On March 10, a massive march was held, the result of a call from the General University Council, in defense of the University. Protesters rejected an amendment to Article 98 of the Law of the State Pension Institute (IPE) and the reduction of the 2016 budget. More than 51,000 university staff and students marched across the state to protest debts and poor funding. Pensioners and retirees, artists, union members, and members of other academic communities of other institutions joined them. It was the largest demonstration in the history of the University. In 2017, on January 31, the LXIV Legislature of the State Congress voted in favor of budgetary autonomy for the University of Veracruz (UV) and laid the groundwork for establishing by law a higher percentage of the state budget allocated to the university. This was completed in November, when Decree 350 amended the Political Constitution to give no less than 4% of the state budget to UV.

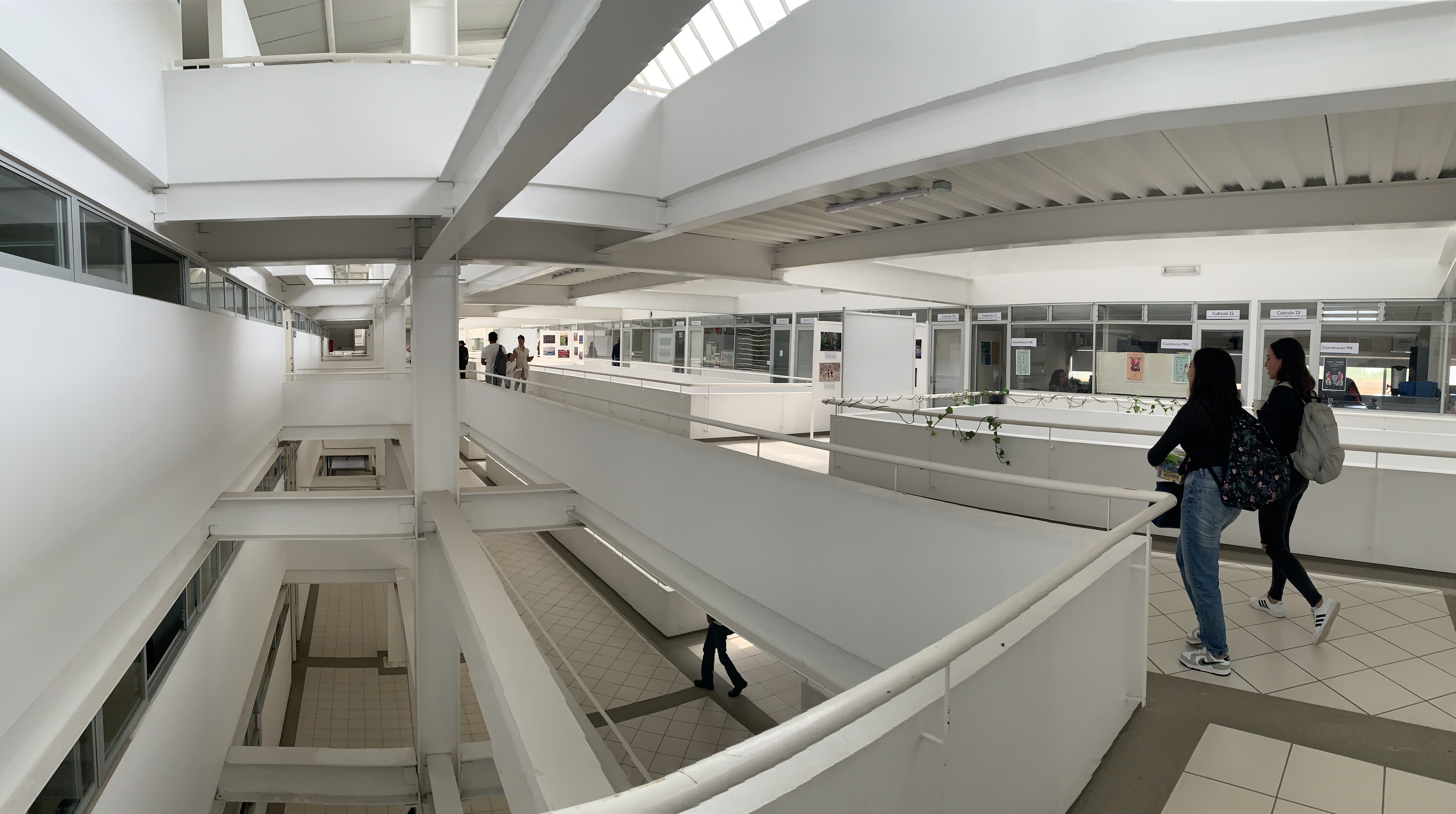
Pasillos Facultad de Pedagogía UV. Xalapa, Veracruz

Over more than 80 years of its existence, the Universidad Veracruzana expanded its services to many areas of the state of Veracruz. Present in five of the most important economic regions of the state with schools in 14 cities: Xalapa, Veracruz, Boca del Río, Orizaba, Córdoba, Río Blanco, Amatlán, Nogales, Camerino Z. Mendoza, Poza Rica, Tuxpan, Minatitlán, Coatzacoalcos and Acayucan. Only a few universities in the country had this accelerated geographical development. Its conversion had happened with five integrated campuses on each one of the regions. Today, Veracruzana is one of the largest universities in Mexico, with over 70,000 students enrolled.

== Regions and campuses ==
Veracruz University Regions

The Veracruzana University is administered in five regions, also known as campuses. The main administration is located in Xalapa, while the other regions have vice-rectorates. Except for the Xalapa campus, each region comprises more than one city, and the University's buildings are located in 14 municipalities.

The regions are as follows:

- Xalapa
- Veracruz, which also includes the municipality of Boca del Río.
- Coatzacoalcos-Minatitlán, comprised of the campuses in these cities, plus those in Acayucan and Huazuntlán.
- Orizaba-Córdoba, which also includes Ciudad Mendoza, Nogales, Río Blanco, Peñuela, Amatlán de los Reyes, and Tequila.
- Poza Rica-Tuxpan, plus Ixhuatlán de Madero and Espinal.

In the region of Xalapa, the university has 32 schools, 22 institutes and research centers, one Children's Musical Induction Center, one Language Center, one Foreign Languages Department, two Self-access Language Learning Centers, two Arts Workshops, one Foreign Students School, one Advanced Technology Lab, one Analytic Resolution Support Services Unit, one School Hospital and one Library Services and Information Unit (USBI).

In Veracruz, Veracruz: 13 schools, four institutes and research centers, one Children's Musical Induction Center, one Language Center, two Self-access Language Learning Centers, one Art Workshop and one USBI.

In Orizaba-Córdoba, Veracruz: 8 schools, two Language Centers, two Self-access Language Learning Centers and an Advanced Technology Lab. In Poza Rica: 13 schools, one Language Center, a Self-access Language Learning Center, and two Art Workshops.

Coatzacoalcos-Minatitlán, Veracruz, 8 schools, one Language Center, two Self-access Learning Centers and two USBIs. Furthermore, it is associated with the North American Mobility Project, a transnational academic program that links it to Georgia Southern University in the United States and Wilfrid Laurier University in Canada.

== Notable alumni ==
- Raquel Torres Cerdán - chef and anthropologist.
- Juan Pablo Villalobos - writer.
- Fernanda Melchor - writer.
- Arsenio Dominguez - Secretary General of the UN International Maritime Organization.
- Lucía Gutiérrez Rebolloso - jazz singer.
- Emilio Carballido - Writer.
