= Allan Harris (musician) =

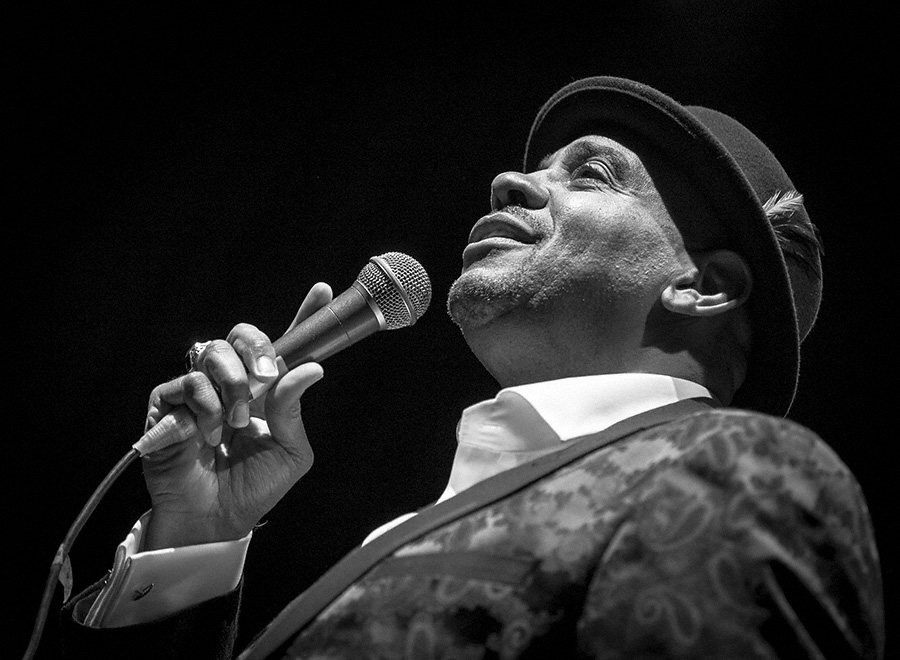
- Harris performing at Cosmopolite in Oslo in 2016

Background information
- Origin: Brooklyn, New York City
- Genres: Jazz
- Occupation: Singer

Allan Harris (born April 4, 1956) is a jazz vocalist, guitarist, and songwriter from Harlem, New York. Described as having a "formidable baritone with … husky edges and deep resonant low notes", and Harris has been called a protean talent. Harris is known for both his albums and his live performances. His album Convergence a collaboration with pianist Takana Miryamoto was critically praised, and his album Cross That River (2006) was widely covered for its perspective on issues of ethnicity in the American western expansion.

He released an album in 2016 entitled Nobody's Gonna Love You Better.

Harris's album Cross That River was the subject of a 2006 story on the National Public Radio program All Things Considered, which explored Harris's journey into the roles of African-Americans in the western expansion of the United States in the 19th century. Harris also has used Cross That River as a teaching tool in schools in New York,and North Carolina. Cross That River is also a musical which had its debut at the New York Musical Theatre Festival in 2009. It received a residency grant from Chamber Music America and has been included in the Kennedy Center's Performing Arts Series (2008).

In 2014 Allan Harris appeared in the music theatre show Cafe Society Swing by Alex Webb (musician) in a three-week run at 59E59 Theaters in New York City with a cast including vocalists Charenee Wade and Cyrille Aimée and an eight-piece band including bassist Mimi Jones. It attracted positive reviews including a Critic's Pick from The New York Times.

== Discography ==
- Setting the Standard (Love Productions Records, 1994)
- It's a Wonderful World (Mons, 1995)
- Here Comes Allan Harris and the Metropole Orchestra (Mons, 1996)
- The Music of Duke Ellington (Mons, 1999) - with Claire Martin
- Love Came: The Songs of Strayhorn (Love, 2001)
- Cross That River (Love, 2006)
- Nat King Cole: Long Live the King (Love, 2007)
- Cry of the Thunderbird (Love, 2008)
- Dedicated to You: Allan Harris Sings a Nat King Cole Christmas (Love, 2010)
- Open Up Your Mind (Love, 2011)
- Convergence (Love, 2012) - with Takana Miryamoto
- Black Bar Jukebox (Love, 2015)
- Nobody's Gonna Love You Better: Black Bar Jukebox Redux (Love, 2016)
- The Genius of Eddie Jefferson (Resilience, 2018) - with Richie Cole
- Kate's Soulfood (Love, 2021)
- Live at Blue Llama Jazz Club (Live at Blue Llama Records, 2023)
- The Poetry of Jazz: Live at Blue Llama (Live at Blue Llama Records, 2025)

== See also ==
- Encyclopedia of Jazz Musicians
- Vimeo interview
- Jazziz
