= Cyrille Aimée =

French jazz singer

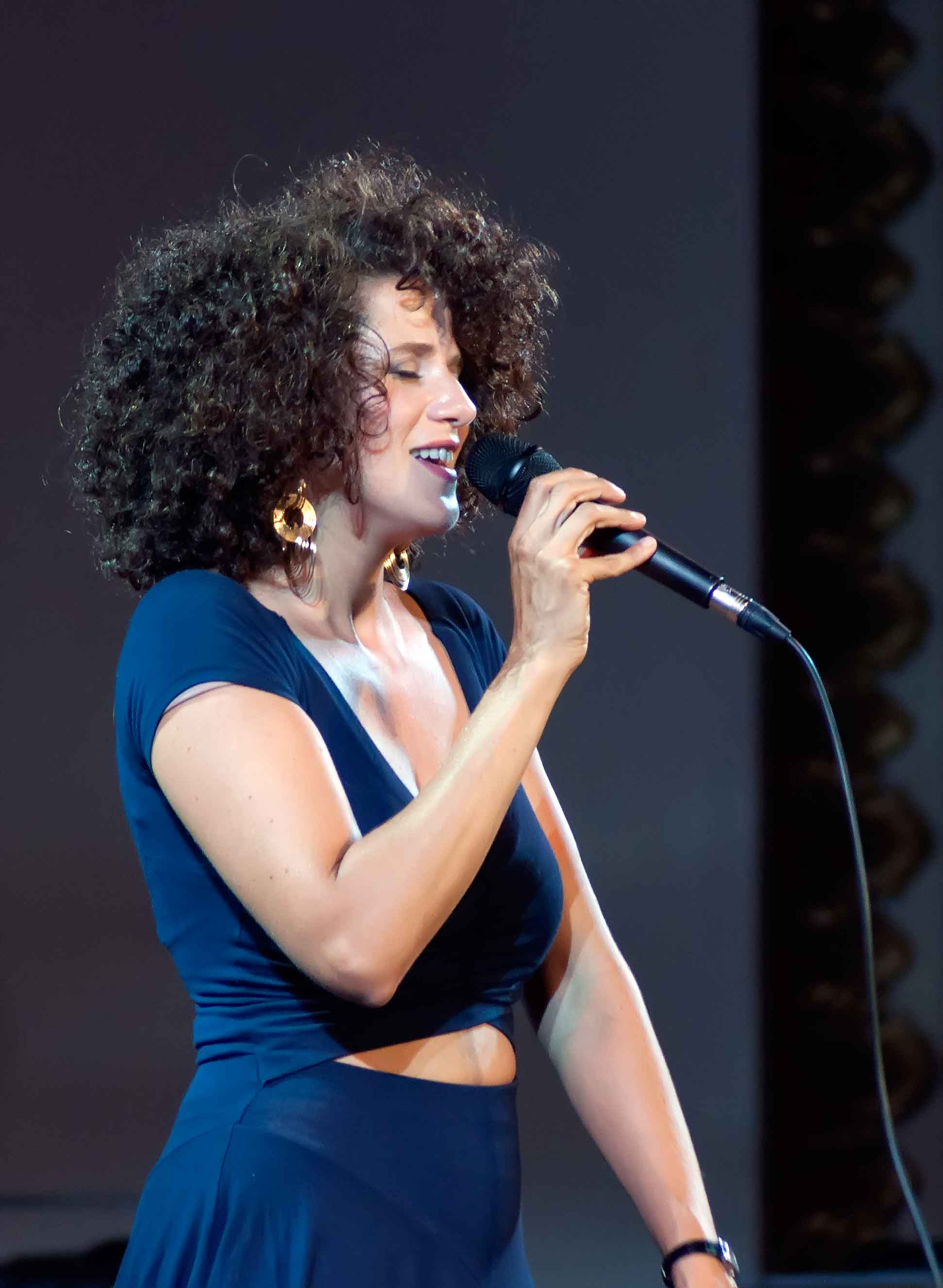
- Aimée in 2018

Background information
- Born: Cyrille Aimée Daudel; 10 August 1984 (age 42); Samois-sur-Seine, Fontainebleau, France
- Genre: Jazz
- Occupation: Singer
- Instrument: Vocals
- Label: Mack Avenue
- Website: www.cyrillemusic.com

Cyrille Aimée Daudel (French: [si.ʁil ɛ.me]; born 10 August 1984) is a French jazz singer.

== Biography ==
She grew up in the French town of Samois-sur-Seine, in Fontainebleau, France. Her father is French and her mother is from the Dominican Republic.

She won the Montreux Jazz Festival Competition in 2007, was a finalist in the Thelonious Monk International Jazz Competition in 2010, and won the Sarah Vaughan International Jazz Vocal Competition in 2012.

Her 2019 album Move On featured cover versions of songs by Stephen Sondheim. The album received praise from Sondheim, and one of its songs, "Marry Me a Little", was nominated for a Grammy Award.

== Critical reception ==
New York Times music reviewer Stephen Holden described Aimée as a blend of Michael Jackson and Sarah Vaughan and wrote that the "saucy... jazz singer [stood] with one foot in tradition and the other in electronics," that her voice had a "tart, girlish chirp", and that her Surreal Band fused traditional and futuristic electronics with textures mixing jazz and funk. New York Times reviewer Nate Chinen wrote that she had a "sweet, girlish voice that she controls with a sniper's precision".

Star-Ledger reviewer Ronni Reich described her sound as "instantly recognizable" with a "soft, girlish buzz with a touch of an Edith Piaf-like quaver." Reviewer John Fordham in The Guardian wrote that she is a "subtle and articulate vocalist" who is "light-stepping, casually fluent and persuasive" and sometimes "coolly understated in a soft glide." Classicalite reviewer Mike Greenblatt described Aimée as "talented, precocious, funny, cultured, with the kind of instantly-recognizable voice that has no known precedent."

Aimée was singled out for particular praise for her role in Alex Webb's music theatre piece Cafe Society Swing at New York's 59E59 Theaters in Christmas 2014, where she starred alongside vocalists Charenee Wade and Allan Harris. The show received a Critic's Pick in the New York Times.

== Emmet's Place ==
Aimée is a frequent guest of the NYC jazz pianist Emmet Cohen, where she performs a variety of songs. Her most popular performance on his Youtube channel was a cover of a Louis Armstrong classic "La vie en Rose" which reached over 8 million views. Additionally she had a popular performance of the song "After You've Gone".

== Discography ==
- One More by Crème Fraîche: The Lost Recordings (2006)
- Cyrille Aimée and the Surreal Band (2009)
- Smile (Cyrille Aimée Music, 2009) with Diego Figueiredo
- Just the Two of Us (Venus, 2010) with Diego Figueiredo
- Live at Small's (SmallsLIVE, 2010)
- A Very Gypsy Christmas (GotMusic, 2011)
- Burstin' Out, Chicago Jazz Orchestra with Cyrille Aimée (Origin, 2013)
- Live at Birdland (Cyrille Music, 2013)
- It's a Good Day (Mack Avenue, 2014)
- Let's Get Lost (Mack Avenue, 2016)
- Live (Mack Avenue, 2018)
- Move On: A Sondheim Adventure (Mack Avenue, 2019)
- I'll Be Seeing You (Daudel, 2021)
- Petite Fleur (Storyville, 2021)
- à Fleur de Peau (Whirlwind Recordings, 2024)
- Cyrille Aimée: 4.24 (Cyrille Aimée Music, 2024)
