= Lucía Gutiérrez Rebolloso =

Mexican jazz singer

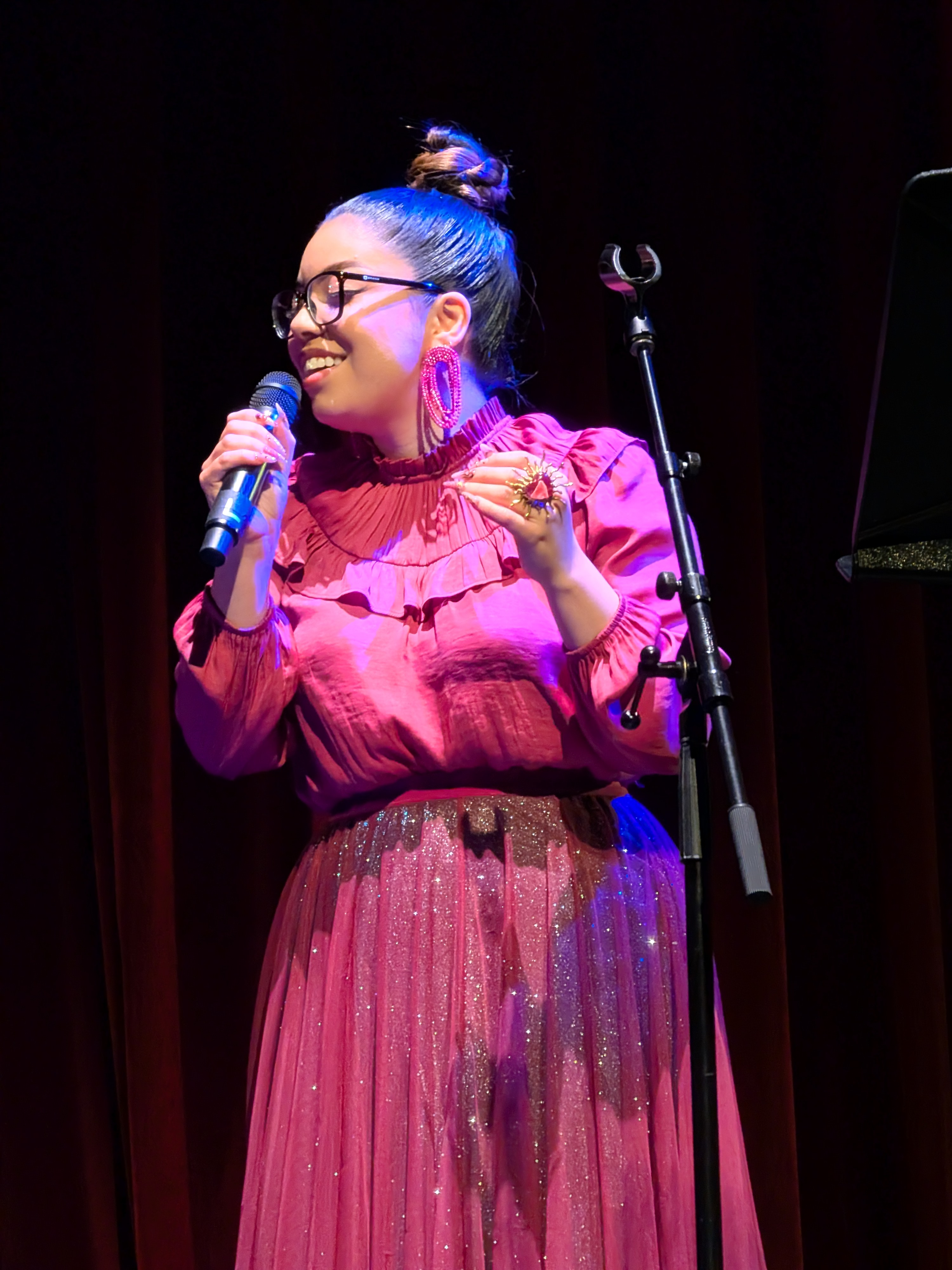
- Lucía Gutiérrez Rebolloso in 2026.

Background information
- Born: Veracruz, Mexico
- Genres: Jazz; Bolero; Son Jarocho
- Occupation: Singer
- Award: Sarah Vaughan International Jazz Vocal Competition
- Website: www.luciasings.com

Lucía Gutiérrez Rebolloso is a Mexican jazz singer. Rebolloso won the Sarah Vaughan International Jazz Vocal Competition in 2022, becoming the first Mexican singer to win the award.

== Early life and education ==
Lucía Gutiérrez Rebolloso was born in Veracruz, Mexico. She grew up singing son jarocho at 5 years old, with her parents, Laura Rebolloso and Ramón Gutiérrez, who are son jarocho musicians and founders of the son jarocho group Son de Madera.

Rebolloso graduated from Universidad Veracruzana in 2022 with a bachelor's degree in jazz studies.

== Career ==
In 2022, Rebolloso won the Sarah Vaughan International Jazz Vocal Competition. She is the first Mexican singer to win this award with an English and Spanish interpretation of "Cuando vuelva a tu lado/What a Difference a Day Makes" by composer María Grever.

Gutiérrez Rebolloso has collaborated with Natalia Lafourcade and Aloe Blacc. She released her self-titled debut album, Lucía, in 2025.
