= Open Fire (1994 film) =

1994 British television film

- Genre: Crime drama
- Written by: Paul Greengrass
- Directed by: Paul Greengrass
- Starring: Rupert Graves; Samuel West; Douglas Hodge; Kate Hardie; Eddie Izzard; Jim Carter; Colin McCormack; Sam Halpenny; Joe Tucker; Aran Bell
- Composers: Seamus Beaghen; Bruce Smith
- Country of origin: United Kingdom
- Original language: English

Production
- Executive producer: Simon Shaps
- Producer: Jeff Pope
- Cinematography: Alan Jones
- Editor: Clive Maltby
- Running time: 105 minutes
- Production company: London Weekend Television

Original release
- Network: ITV
- Release: 12 November 1994

Open Fire is a British television crime drama film, made for ITV, and first broadcast on 12 November 1994. The film was written and directed by Paul Greengrass, and concerns the police manhunt for David Martin, who escaped from custody following his arrest for shooting a police officer, leading to the shooting in error of another man, Stephen Waldorf. The film stars Rupert Graves as Martin, with Samuel West as Waldorf, Douglas Hodge as investigating officer DC Peter Finch, and Kate Hardie as Sue Stephens. Open Fire was filmed in Belsize Park and Hampstead, London. It has never been released commercially.

The UK based TV Channel Talking Pictures TV has shown Open Fire, firstly on 5 October 2024.

== Plot ==
The film concerns the manhunt for David Martin and the events surrounding this. Stephen Waldorf, a 26-year-old film editor, was mistakenly identified as Martin and shot by police firearms officers. The story focuses on Finch, a young police officer who, at the beginning of the film, is awarded a medal for bravery in the course of duty after he arrested an armed criminal, and David Martin. Martin — a transvestite with a provocative and aggressive temperament — is released from prison having served his latest sentence. He has escaped twice during his time in custody, and is soon in trouble once again. During the course of a burglary at a private cinema, Martin shoots a police officer as he tries to escape. After he is later arrested, he promptly escapes and goes on the run. By 1983 he is Britain's most wanted man, and a massive police manhunt is under way to apprehend him.

As the hunt for Martin intensifies, police identify a suspect whom they believe might be the fugitive, but after he is shot by Finch, he turns out not to be Martin. The car driver fled the scene. Finch is subsequently suspended from duty. The case becomes a police scandal, with Finch accused of attempted murder. Martin is finally caught after being chased into an Underground station and along a railway tunnel, where police eventually corner and arrest him, without any shot being fired.

== Cast ==
- Rupert Graves as David Martin
- Samuel West as Steven Waldorf
- Douglas Hodge as DC Peter Finch
- Kate Hardie as Sue Stephens
- Eddie Izzard as Rich
- Jim Carter as Det Chief Supt. Young
- Colin McCormack as Det. Chief Supt. Haylor
- Sam Halpenny as DC Peter Van Dee
- Joe Tucker as DS Paul Johnson
- Aran Bell as PC Nicholas Carr
- Gwyneth Powell as Gloria Martin
- Trevor Byfield as Ralph Martin
- Susan Tordoff as Susan Finch
