= China Moses =

American singer and broadcaster (born 1978)

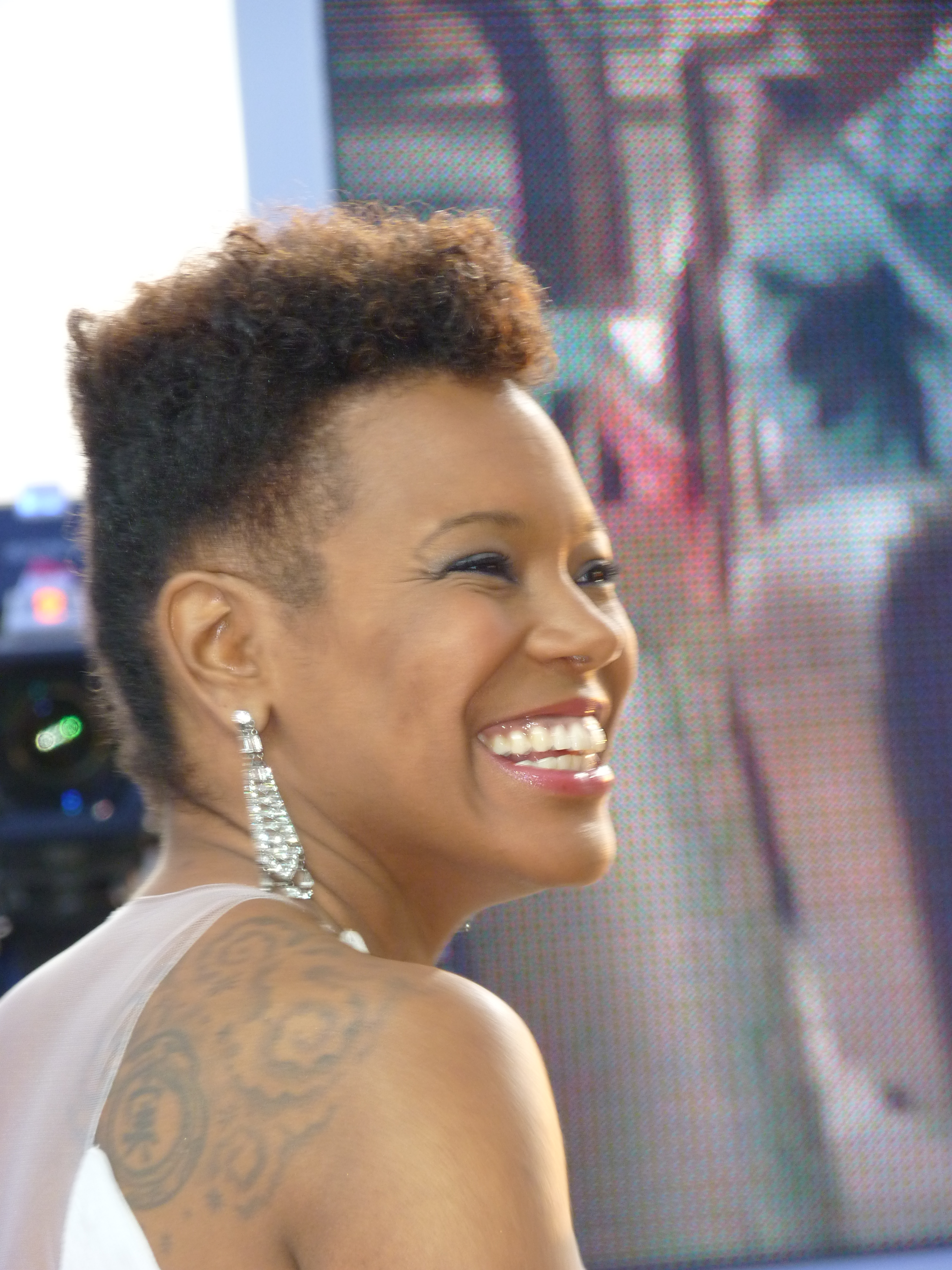
- Moses in Cannes, 2012

Background information
- Born: January 9, 1978 (age 48); Los Angeles, California, U.S.
- Genres: Jazz, R&B, soul, pop
- Occupations: Singer and television host
- Instrument: Vocals
- Years active: 1995–present
- Labels: Blue Note, EMI, UMG
- Website: www.chinamoses.com
- Parent(s): Dee Dee Bridgewater and Gilbert Moses

China Moses (born January 9, 1978, in Los Angeles) is an American singer and television host.

== Life and career ==
Born in Los Angeles, California, United States, China Moses is the daughter of jazz singer Dee Dee Bridgewater and director Gilbert Moses. She released her first single, "Time" (1996), at the age of 18, along with her first video directed by Jean-Baptiste Mondino. This was followed by three albums: China (1997), On tourne en rond ("We Turn Around") (2000), and Good Lovin (2004). She worked on her albums with Swedish hip-hop label Breaking Bread, as well as with artists such as DJ Mehdi, Diam's, Karriem Riggins, Guru, Anthony Marshall, and sound engineer Bob Power.

She has appeared on music channels such as MCM (1999–2001) and MTV France (2004–2011). In 2011, she joined the team for the 8th season of French TV show Le Grand Journal on Canal+, which she left in July 2012. From October 2011 to December 2012 she presented Jazz Radio's Made in China, a daily program that aired from 7pm to 8pm. In a bid to manage her activities as an entertainer, China launched her own production company, MadeInChina Productions, in 2008.

Moses and French pianist Raphaël Lemonnier created a show called Gardenias for Dinah, a tribute to their mutual idol Dinah Washington, who was also the inspiration for the album This One’s for Dinah, which was released in 2009 by Blue Note.

After their worldwide tour, which included Europe, India, Lebanon, Canada, and Japan, Moses and Lemonnier's next work was a tribute to the great blues and jazz female singers who have inspired or have influenced Moses. These include Dinah Washington ("Resolution Blues", "You're Crying") and some of her precursors and peers: Mamie Smith ("Crazy Blues"), Lil Green ("Why Don't You Do Right?"), as well as stars such as Esther Phillips ("Cherry Wine (Little Esther song)"), Nina Simone ("Just Say I Love Him", "Work Song"), Etta James ("I Just Wanna Make Love to You"), Janis Joplin ("Move Over"), and Donna Summer ("Hot Stuff"). Other songs have been adapted specifically for stage performances such as: "Kitchen Man" by Bessie Smith, "Today I Sing the Blues" by Helen Humes and Aretha Franklin, and "Love Me or Leave Me" sung by Billie Holiday. Moses has said: "Our stage performances are organized like a show. I love to tell stories, I see myself as a jazz storyteller and I like to make sure that people smile in between songs."^{Ref?} The album Crazy Blues was released in 2012.

In 2013, she became a music expert consultant to the French electricity supplier ERDF. She hosted the TV documentary Soul Power as part of the summer series Summer of Soul on Arte.

In addition to her participation on André Manoukian's album So in Love (2010, Blue Note France/EMI), Moses presented a new show in the fall of 2013 featuring torch songs such as "Don't Let Me Be Misunderstood", "Lullaby of Birdland" and "I've Got You Under My Skin". Additionally, she performs in Cafe Society Swing, a show written and produced by Alex Webb that revives the good times of the legendary 1940s New York nightclub, Cafe Society, which promoted racial equality and progressive causes, and where "Strange Fruit" was performed for the first time by Billie Holiday.

Moses co-presented and sang at the first UNESCO International Jazz Day in Paris, France, in 2012, and performed numerous times for US UNESCO. She initiated a documentary on the first and second International Jazz Day in Paris. In 2013, she was invited to participate in the Young Leaders Program of the French-American Foundation.

On several occasions, Moses has shared the stage with her mother, Dee Dee Bridgewater, and she has been accompanied by orchestras such as the Deutsches Filmorchester Babelsberg and the WDR Big Band.

In 2017, Moses released on the MPS imprint the album Nightintales, written in five days with Black British multi-instrumentalist Anthony Marshall. The pair recorded the album in London at the analogue studio, Snap Studios. The album features Luke Smith on piano, Neville Malcolm on bass and Jerome Brown on drums, three top Black British musicians of the UK soul-jazz scene.

== Discography ==
=== As leader ===
- 1997: China (Source/Virgin)
- 2000: On tourne en rond (Source)
- 2004: Good Lovin (EMI)
- 2009: This One's for Dinah (MadeInChina Productions/Blue Note France/EMI)
- 2012: Crazy Blues (MadeInChina/Decca/Universal Classics and Jazz International)
- 2017: Nightintales (MadeInChina/MPS)
- 2021: & The Vibe Tribe (MadeInChina/MPS)
- 2026: it’s complicated… (MadeInChina Productions)

=== As sidewoman ===
- 1995 : Sol En Si (Solidarité Enfants Sida)
  - "For Your Love" (duo with Dee Dee Bridgewater, her mother)
- 1997 : Rue Case-Nègres by Nèg'Marrons
  - "Ménage à 4"
- 1997 : Jazz à St-Germain
  - "Lover Man"
- 1998 : Détournement de son by Fabe
  - "Superstars, Superheros"
- 2000 : Loa Project Vol. 2 by DJ Cam
- 2000 : Les Lascars contre le Sida
  - "Ton passé"
- 2001 : Kimberlite
  - "Tell Me How Much" (duo with Will Roberson)
- 2001 : Supernova Superstar by Sinclair
  - "Qu'est-ce qui me pousse"
- 2001 : Les Voix de l'Espoir, a feminine collective founded by Princess Erika
  - "Que serais-je demain?"
- 2001 : Jalane by Jalane
  - "On a tous pêché" (trio with Jalane and K-reen)
  - "Chéri" (Chœurs)
  - "Prise au piège" (Chœurs)
  - "Jalousie" (Chœurs)
- 2003 : Flic$ & Hor$-la-loi by Gomez & Dubois
  - "Hôtel Commissariat"
- 2003 : Brut de femme by Diam's
  - "Évasion"
- 2003 : Soulshine Vol 2 by DJ Cam
  - "He's Gone"
- 2004 : Honneur aux Dames by Takfarinas
  - "Sih Sit"
  - "C'est l'amour"
- 2005 : Peines de Maures by La Caution
  - "Boite de macs"
- 2005 : Mr Freedom by Gabin
  - "The Other Way Around"
  - "She's Still Watching Me"
  - "Thousand and One Nights"
  - "Just Be Yourself"
- 2007 : Tribute to Polnareff
  - "Lettre à France" (duo with Weepers Circus)
- 2010 : The Princess and the Frog by The Walt Disney Company: Tiana (lead character)
- 2010 : Alpha Omega by Wayne Beckford
  - "Come on Over"
- 2010 : So in Love by André Manoukian
- 2010 : Alarash by Alarash
- 2013 : Swingin the Count by Cedric Caillaud Trio
  - "Lil' Darlin"
- 2013 : Ikiz Checking In by Ikiz
  - "Insanely"

== Music videos ==
- 1997 : Time, directed by Jean-Baptiste Mondino
- 2000 : Être La Bas, directed by Kool-Mangaa
- 2004 : Ce Serait Si Simple (with Djibril Cissé), directed by John Gabriel Biggs
- 2009 : Mad About the Boy directed by Aurélien Poitrimoult
- 2009 : Dinah's Blues
- 2009 : Dinah's Blues Live
- 2009 : Fine Fine Daddy Live, produced by MadeInChina Productions
- 2013 : China Moses à l'International Jazz Day
- 2013 : Crazy Blues, directed by Alastair "Gee-Lock" Christopher

== Voice over ==
- 2007 : Sound design for MTV France Channels
- 2009 : The Princess and the Frog: Tiana (European French dub)
- 2012 : Advertisement Levi's Go Forth, France
- 2019 : The Lion King : Soloist

== Acting ==
- 1997: Moesha (TV Series): Chyna
- Songs in the Key of Strife (1997): Chyna
- 2013 : Battle of the Year: MTV France Host
