= Quiana Lynell =

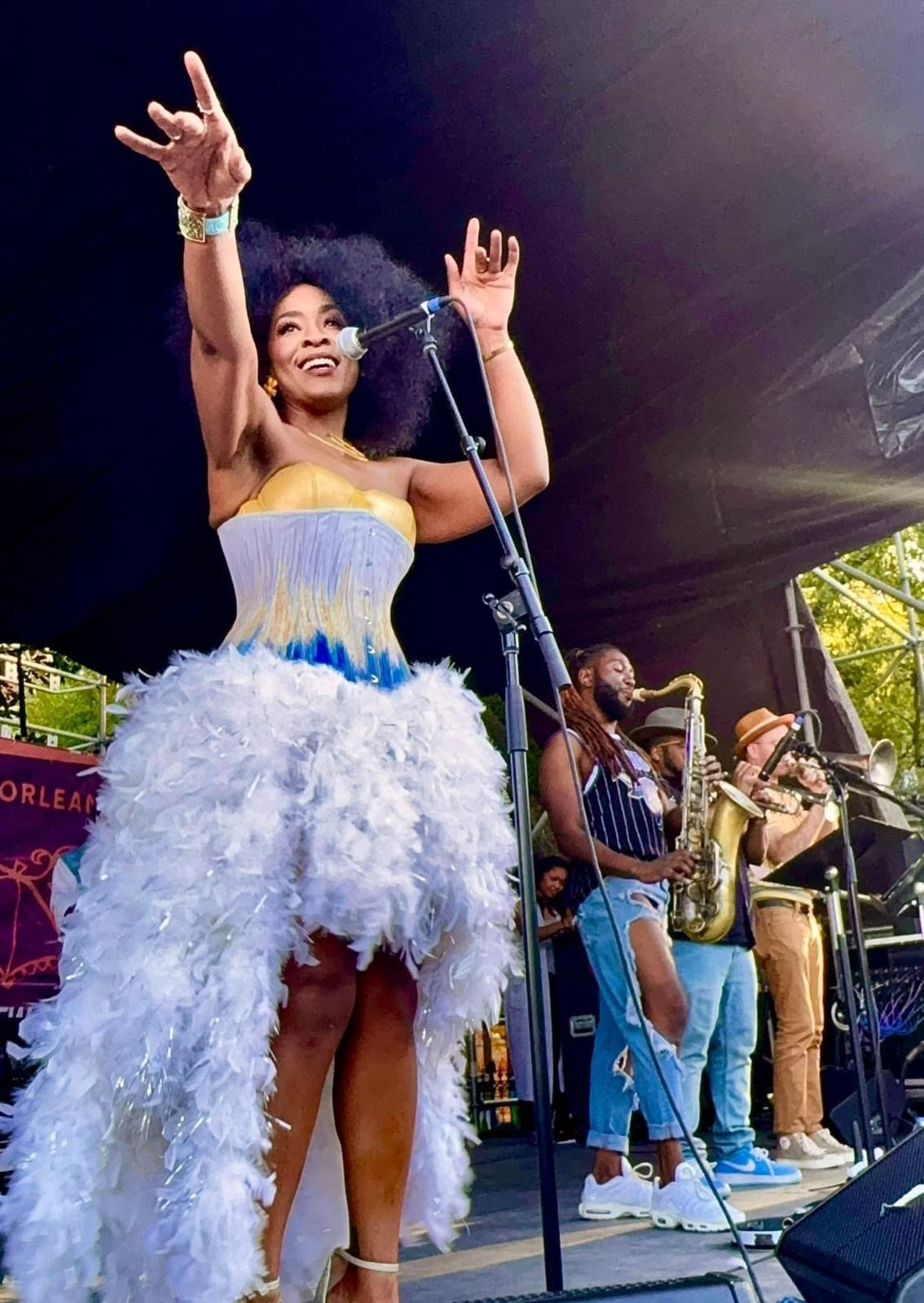
- Performing at the New Orleans French Quarter Fest 2024

Background information
- Born: April 16, 1981 (age 45); Tyler, Texas, U.S.
- Genres: Jazz, blues, funk, R&B, gospel
- Occupations: Vocalist, song writer
- Instrument: Singing
- Label: Concord Records
- Website: quianalynell.com

Quiana Lynell (born April 16, 1981) is an American blues and jazz singer, arranger and songwriter.

== Early life ==
Lynell was born in Tyler, Texas. She grew up in a religious home and was exposed to gospel music from a young age. During high school she was in the all-state choir.

== Education ==
Lynell moved to Baton Rouge for her education. Lynell earned a B.A. degree in Vocal Performance from Louisiana State University on a scholarship.

== Career ==
Lynell began her singing career as a classical singer and was a member of the St. James Episcopal Church choir in Baton Rouge. After meeting Janelle Brown, lead singer of the zydeco group 2 Da T, she began exploring additional musical genres, including zydeco and R&B. She has been mentored by notable artists such as Aaron Neville, Germaine Bazzle, and Wendell Brunious.

In 2017 she won the Sarah Vaughan International Jazz Vocal Competition and as a result of the award she received a recording contract with Concord Records.

Lynell has performed with Nona Hendryx, Terence Blanchard, Jon Cowherd, Marvin Sewell, Eric Harland, Herbie Hancock, Patti Austin, Bilal, Ledisi, and with local artists and bands in Louisiana. She regularly performs at venues in New Orleans and Baton Rouge, including at the New Orleans Jazz and Heritage Festival on multiple occasions. She has also performed with the Baton Rouge Symphony Orchestra as a principle Soprano In 2017, with the Preservation Hall Jazz Band, Lynell performed a tribute concert to Ella Fitzgerald, celebrating her 100th birthday. In 2018, Lynell was a featured artist with Bernard Purdie's All-Star Shuffle, and Bobbi Humphrey, at Brooklyn Academy of Music's R&B Festival in Brooklyn.

In 2016, Lynell released the EP Loving Me (Q Sound) and the single Baton Rouge (Q Sound). Lynell has been a featured soloist on studio albums.

Lynell has developed the educational program, "Made in America: Lyrically Speaking: Breaking Down Jazz, Blues and Soul in American Music, from the Vocalist Perspective", which has been used in clinics across the United States to educated students on jazz, blues and traditional American music from the vocalist perspective. She is also the founder of the running club, Musicians Run, aimed at promoting running to local musicians in Baton Rouge.

Lynell has held several teaching positions, including as band directors in elementary and middle schools. Since 2016 she has been a private vocal instructor and an adjunct professor at Loyola University New Orleans, Louisiana.

== Discography ==
- 2018: Live at the 2018 New Orleans Jazz and Heritage Festival (Munck Music)
- 2019: A Little Love (Concord Jazz)
- 2022: Live at the 2022 New Orleans Jazz and Heritage Festival (Munck Music)

== Awards ==
- 2017: Winner of Sarah Vaughan International Jazz Vocal Competition
- 2017: Nominee for Best Emerging Artist, Best of the Beat Awards

== Personal life ==
Lynell has two children and lives in Baton Rouge.
