= Deelee Dubé =

British jazz vocalist

Deelee Dubé (born Sitandile Dube on 15 January) is a British jazz vocalist and songwriter.

She signed to Concord Jazz and made her debut performance at the 38th edition of the Montréal International Jazz Festival in July 2017.

== Background ==
Born in London, Dubé is the first British winner of the Sarah Vaughan International Jazz Vocal Competition at the James Moody Jazz Festival. She is the daughter of South African jazz musician Jabu Nkosi.

She held a weekly Monday night residency as a house vocalist Upstairs at Ronnie Scott's Jazz Club from 2015 with Italian tenor saxophonist and host Renato D’Aiello.

Dubé is described as having 'a voice of the purest gold' with 'a deep grainy power and quick-witted musicality'.

In 2021, her debut studio album, recorded on the Concord Jazz label, received five nominations and subsequently won the Best International Jazz Collaboration award at the South African Mzantsi Jazz Awards.

Dubé featured in Florence and the Machine’s “Dog Days Are Over” (2010 version) music video which was nominated on 3 August 2010 for four MTV Video Music Awards in the categories Video of the Year, Best Rock Video, Best Art Direction and Best Cinematography, and won for Best Art Direction on 12 September 2010.

== Discography ==
- 2020: Trying Times (Concord Jazz)
