= James Moody Jazz Festival =

Annual jazz festival held in Newark, New Jersey, USA

TD James Moody Jazz Festival

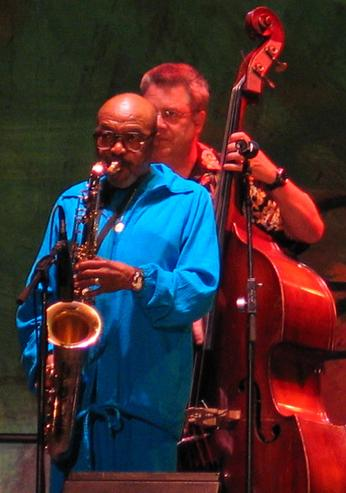
- The jazz saxophonist James Moody
- Status: Active
- Genre: Jazz festival
- Frequency: Annually in November
- Venue: New Jersey Performing Arts Center, Newark Museum of Art, others in the city
- Location: Newark, New Jersey
- Inaugurated: October 15, 2012
- Sponsor: TD Bank

The James Moody Jazz Festival is an annual jazz festival held in Newark, New Jersey.

== Background ==
The festival, organized by the New Jersey Performing Arts Center has been a fall gathering of musicians and audiences held at various Newark venues since 2012. Jazz musician Christian McBride oversees and curates the event. The festival is named for jazz saxophonist James Moody.

== Venues ==
Various locations throughout Newark host festival events. Sites include the Newark Museum of Art, the New Jersey Performing Arts Center, Newark jazz club Clement's Place, Bethany Baptist Church, and NICO Kitchen + Bar.

== Sarah Vaughan International Jazz Vocal Competition ==
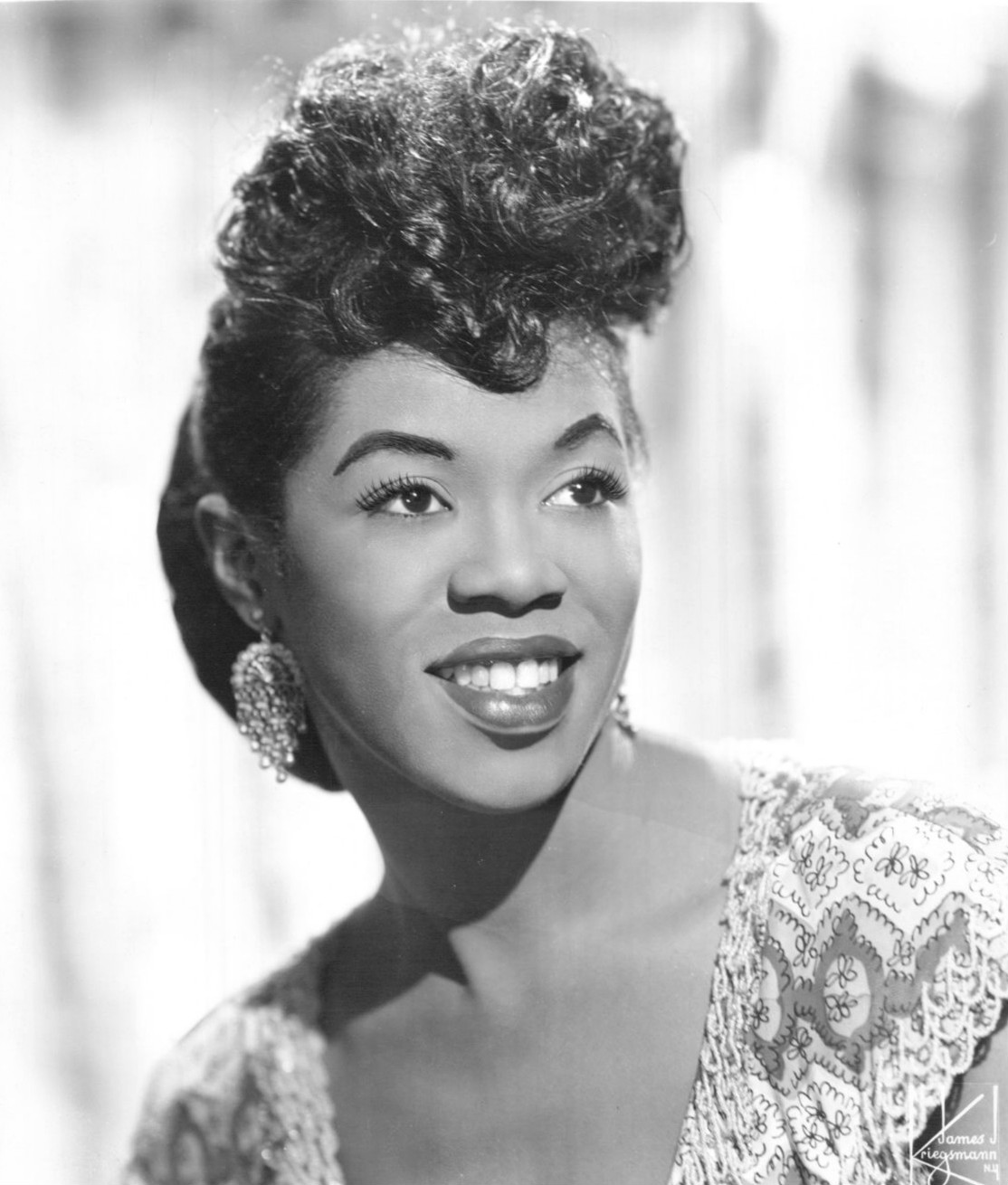
Jazz vocalist Sarah Vaughan in 1955

The festival hosts an annual jazz vocalist competition named for Newark-born jazz singer Sarah Vaughan. The event, as of the 2020s, is open to solo vocalists of all nationalities who are not signed to a major record label. The competition judges contestants on criteria "that includes vocal quality, intonation, ability to swing, individuality, and improvisation."

Initially open only to female vocalists, in the early 2020s the competition began allowing male vocalists to apply. The competition is also known as the "Sassy Awards" for Vaughn's nickname.

=== Winning vocalists by year ===
Winners to date are:

2012: Cyrille Aimee

2013: Jazzmeia Horn

2014: Ashleigh Smith

2015: Arianna Neikrug

2016: Deelee Dubé

2017: Quiana Lynell

2018: Laurin Talese

2019: Samara Joy

2020: Gabrielle Cavassa, Tawanda Suessbrich-Joaquim

2021: G. Thomas Allen

2022: Lucía Gutiérrez Rebolloso

2023: Tyreek McDole

2024: April May Webb

2025: Kate Kortum

== See also ==
- New Jersey music venues by capacity
- North to Shore Festival
