= Colin McCormack =

Welsh actor (1941–2004)

- Born: John Colin McCormack; 2 December 1941; Penarth, Glamorgan, Wales
- Died: 19 June 2004 (aged 62); London, England
- Other name: Colin MacCormack
- Education: Royal Central School of Speech and Drama
- Years active: 1955–2004
- Spouse: Wendy Allnutt (m. 1968)
- Children: 2

John Colin McCormack (2 December 1941 – 19 June 2004) was a Welsh actor who enjoyed success in classical stage performances and television shows including BBC TV's Dixon of Dock Green, a show he returned to twenty years later when he played a police constable. McCormack also appeared in several feature films during his career.

McCormack was probably best known for his recurring role as Alan in the 1984 science fiction series Chocky and for playing Kevin Masters in EastEnders.

McCormack's electric presence and square jaw coupled with his imposing athletic build usually saw him typecast as a soldier or policeman. He nonetheless appeared in a wide range of roles including Man About the House, The Good Life and Yes Minister. He also tutored and coached at the Guildhall School of Music and Drama where his students included Ewan McGregor, Daniel Craig and Damian Lewis.

McCormack died of cancer aged 62 after a short illness, following a tour of Romeo and Juliet in Hong Kong with the Royal Shakespeare Company.

== History ==
=== Early life and career ===
McCormack was born in Penarth near Cardiff in Glamorgan, Wales on 2 December 1941, during the Second World War, the eldest son of a railway worker. Educated at Kings College, a private junior school in Cardiff and Penarth Grammar School he appeared in several school plays and also joined the local Victoria Youth Drama Group, appearing in several amateur productions and drama competitions. While still in school, at the age of fourteen in 1955, he was chosen after an audition to play a young crime victim on an early episode of BBC TV's Dixon of Dock Green.

McCormack was a rugby player. In later years he became a squash player.

On leaving grammar school McCormack initially chose to attend an arts course at Cardiff Art College. Despite these early studies, acting remained his first love and he eventually secured a place at the Central School of Speech and Drama in London as a further step towards a professional acting career.

His first professional stage performance came in 1964 as a member of the Bristol Old Vic repertory company when he appeared in the play Bartholomew Fair followed by dozens of ensemble productions over the next few years.

=== Stage appearances ===
==== Royal Shakespeare Company ====
His work at the Old Vic came to the attention of the Royal Shakespeare Company. In 1967 he was invited to join them at their Stratford upon Avon headquarters and he remained associated with them until his death. His first appearance with the Royal Shakespeare Company at Stratford was as a citizen in Coriolanus and during his first full season with the company he went on to play a courtier in Trevor Nunn's production of The Revenger's Tragedy, the First Suitor in All's Well That Ends Well, Donalbain in Peter Hall's production of Macbeth, and Third Musician in Romeo and Juliet.

In the 1970s he played Angus in Macbeth at the Aldwych Theatre, London, Udy in Howard Barker's The Hang of the Gaol, Florence in The Adventures of Awful Knawful at the Warehouse Theatre during 1978 and Chachava in The Caucasian Chalk Circle. The decade ended with McCormack playing Borachio in Much Ado About Nothing in a Royal Shakespeare Company UK tour that started in the autumn of 1979 and continued over into the spring of 1980.

The 1980 season continued with McCormack taking four different roles in Barker's The Loud Boy's Life when he played Costall, Dampsing, Streatham, and Imber. He starred as Macduff in the Barbican Theatre's 1988 showing of Adrian Noble's Macbeth and again in 1989. Also that year he played Mr. Hardacre in Edward Bond's play Restoration, Sebastian in The Tempest at the Royal Shakespeare Theatre, and Kent in the Almeida Theatre's King Lear directed by Cicely Berry.

The 1990s started with McCormack taking a starring role as gang member Dolin in the stage production of A Clockwork Orange at the Barbican Theatre. He returned to the Royal Shakespeare Company for the 1998 and 1999 seasons when the company alternated performances of three plays where he played Mike in Richard Nelson's Goodnight Children Everywhere, the Duke of Milan in The Two Gentlemen of Verona, and Baptista in the bawdy Elizabethan comedy The Taming of the Shrew. He reprised the last role for a small-scale Royal Shakespeare Company tour of the UK during the summer of 2000.

During the last few years of his life McCormack played the Earl of Salisbury in King John several times over the 2001 and 2002 seasons, Casca in Julius Caesar at both the Royal Shakespeare Theatre and the Barbican, and filled three separate roles in Gregory Doran's "Season of Rarities" during the winter of 2002–2003: He was Lord Audley in Edward III, Bramble in Eastward Ho! and Pietro in The Malcontent.

==== Royal Court Theatre company ====
McCormack's occasional association with Royal Court Theatre company started in 1982 when he appeared in G.F. Newman's play Operation Bad Apple. He returned to the Royal Court in 1986 to star in the original stage production of Jim Cartwright's seminal play Road. Also that year he appeared at the Theatre Upstairs in the Royal Court's production of Andrea Dunbar's Shirley. In 1991, he took a leading role in Griselda Gambaro's Putting Two and Two Together again at the Theatre Upstairs and starred in the 1992 production of Timberlake Wertenbaker's unusual play Three Birds Alighting in a Field.

==== Other theatre companies ====
McCormack's other stage appearances include playing Islayev during the Cambridge Theatre Company's (CTC) 1987 tour of A Month in the Country and Pinchwife in The Country Wife in 1991 also with the Cambridge Theatre Company. He took on the dual roles of Chandebise and Poche in Feydeau's A Flea in Her Ear by the Welsh company "Theatr Clwyd" in 1993 and in a number of non-company appearances played Wangel in Ibsen's The Lady from the Sea at the Blackfriars Theatre in 1996, Lord Kent in the Haymarket Theatre's 1997 showing of King Lear, Estragon in Waiting for Godot in 2000 at the Mercury Theatre, Colchester.

McCormack's last UK stage appearance was as Nicholas in Harold Pinter's One for the Road at the Battersea Arts Centre during 2003. Pinter himself was particularly taken with McCormack's impressive interpretation and personally wrote to him afterwards, saying:

"I thought your Nicholas was absolutely terrific. What power and awesome lucidity."

=== Theatre ===
Year	Title	Role	Theatre Company	Director	Notes
1971	Confessions of a Justified Sinner	Drummond	Lyceum Theatre, Edinburgh	Richard Eyre	Edinburgh International Festival

=== Television roles ===
Year	TV Show	Role (If Known)	Other notes
1955	Dixon of Dock Green	Young boy victim	First TV appearance following a BBC audition
1966	Z-Cars	Running youth	1 Episode – Series 5
1970	Please Sir!	Skinhead 'yobbo'	1 Episode in Series 1
1971	Trial	Petrol pump attendant	1 Episode "Debris"
1972	Van der Valk	Sailor	1 Episode "One herring's not enough"
1972	Public Eye	Book Shop Manager	1 Episode "Girl in Blue"
1973	Thriller	Peter	1 Episode "The Eyes have it"
1973	Warship	Petty Officer James	1 Episode "Sub smash"
1973	New Scotland Yard	Detective Sergeant Edge	1 Episode "Edge"
1973	Softly, Softly	Tommy Jarvis	1 Episode "Night Watch"
1973	Spy Trap	Detective Inspector Tarr	1 Episode "A dirty sort of War"
1974	Dixon of Dock Green	Police Constable Wakeman	1 Episode "Sounds" – McCormack's second appearance on the show after a nineteen-year gap
1973–1974	Man About the House	Bernard	3 Episodes "It's only money", "While the cat's away" and "Somebody out there likes me"
1975	Centre Play	Telephone caller	1 Episode "Post Mortem"
1975	Quiller	Press reporter	1 Episode "Objective Caribbean"
1977	The Good Life	Mr Batty	1 Episode "Our speaker today"
1977	Doctor Who	The Commander	2 Episodes "The Sun Makers – Part 3" and "The Sun Makers – Part 4"
1978	Armchair Thriller	Detective Sergeant Bowen	1 Episode "The girl who walked too quickly"
1978	Out	Keith	Unknown episodes
1978	The Sweeney	David Wade	1 Episode "The bigger they are"
1980	The Gentle Touch	Jack Ledley	1 Episode "Break in"
1981	When the Boat Comes In	Starkey	1 Episode "Back to dear old Blighty"
1981	Yes Minister	Bodyguard	1 Episode "The death list"
1982	Kelly Monteith	(unknown)	1 Episode (Series 4 Episode 2)
1978 & 1983	The Professionals	PC Edwards & Inspector	2 Episodes "In The Public Interest" (1978) and "The Ojuka Situation" (1983)
1979–1983	Terry and June	Jack	3 Episodes "Flying Carpets" (1979), "Uncle Terry, Auntie June" (1980) and "Tea and no sympathy" (1983)
1983	Storyboard	George Taylor	1 Episode "Woodentop"
1984	Chocky	Alan	Featured in the entire series
1984	The Lenny Henry Show	As himself in several sketches	1 Episode
1987	Casualty	Dr Gregory Newman	Several episodes
1990	The Chief	Assistant Chief Constable Peter Leech	Appeared in the entire second series
1991	Forever Green	Brian Allerton	1 Episode (Series 2 Episode 3)
1991	EastEnders	Kevin Masters	Multiple episodes
1992	Ruth Rendell Mysteries	Ken Harrison	1 Episode "Kissing the gunner's daughter"
1992	A Touch of Frost	Caretaker	1 Episode "Conclusions"
1993	Spender	Bob Bamford	1 Episode "Kid"
1994	Martin Chuzzlewit	Bullamy	Appeared in the entire series
1994	Open Fire	Detective Chief Superintendent Haylor	TV Play
1996	Kavanagh QC	Sam Lomax	1 Episode "A stranger in the family"
1996	Pie in the Sky	David Arthur Melchett	1 Episode "Coddled Eggs"
1997	Supply and Demand	Superintendent Harper	Appeared in entire series
1994–1997	The Knock	Detective Superintendent Ray Parker	3 Episodes in Series one and three
1997	Inspector Morse	Hargreaves	1 Episode "Death Is Now My Neighbour"
2000	Longitude	Inn keeper	TV play – McCormack's last recorded TV appearance

=== Filmography ===
Year	Film title	Role (If Known)	Other notes
1971	Death Line	Policeman 1	a.k.a. "Raw Meat" in the US. Was killed with a spade by a tube train cannibal
1981	The Winter's Tale	Dion	AKA for US video release " The Complete Dramatic Works of William Shakespeare: The Winter's Tale"
1991	Let Him Have It	Army Recruitment Doctor	AKA for French cinema release "Âge de vivre"
1995	First Knight	Sir Mador	
2004	Raw Meat	Cameraman	Filmed during 2003, the year before McCormack's death

== Personal life ==
McCormack met the actress and movement specialist Wendy Allnutt while they were studying together at the Central School of Speech and Drama in 1963, and they married in 1968 after they had both graduated. They remained married until his death in 2004 and had two children, Katherine and Andrew.

Throughout his stage and television career McCormack cultivated an interest in historic churches and medieval architecture.

== Death ==
In late 2003 McCormack was playing Lord Capulet in a tour of Hong Kong with the Royal Shakespeare Company's Romeo and Juliet when he first started to feel unwell. On his return to England he consulted doctors and learned that he had cancer. He died in hospital in June 2004.
