= Wendy Allnutt =

English actress (born 1946)

- Born: 1 May 1946 (age 80); Lincoln, England
- Education: Royal Central School of Speech and Drama
- Occupations: Actress; acting teacher
- Years active: 1967–present
- Spouse: Colin McCormack
- Children: 2

Wendy Allnutt (born 1 May 1946) is an English stage and screen actress.

She now teaches at the Guildhall School of Music and Drama, leading a degree course in Training Actors Movement.

== Life ==
Born in Lincoln, Allnutt trained for an acting career at the Central School of Speech and Drama from 1963 to 1966. She soon gained many parts on and off stage, and a full-face portrait of her filled the cover of TV Times magazine dated 3 February 1968.

In 1967, Dennis Potter sent Allnutt what has been called a love-letter in print, in which he said

Wendy Allnutt is paralysingly beautiful, with huge, dark eyes which suddenly flood with warmth or freeze into an icy indifference. She can also act...”

Allnutt had met fellow actor Colin McCormack in her first year at the Central School of Speech and Drama and married him in East Berkshire in 1968. They were still together when McCormack died in 2004 and had two children together, Katherine and Andrew McCormack.

As well as her work on screen, she also appeared in Royal Shakespeare Company productions and in West End theatre. She went on to develop a second career in teaching, working at the London Academy of Music and Dramatic Art and the Guildhall School of Music and Drama, and also teaching courses in Italy. In 2003, she was the choreographer for a production of Oliver Goldsmith's She Stoops to Conquer.

== Films ==
- Oh! What a Lovely War (1969), as Flo Smith
- Wuthering Heights (1970)
- All Coppers Are... (1972) as Peg
- From Beyond the Grave (1974), as Pamela
- When Eight Bells Toll (1971), as Sue Kirkside
- The Funny Side of Christmas (1982)
- Priest of Love (1984) as Maria Huxley

== Television ==
- The Avengers: Invasion of the Earthmen (1969), as Sarah
- Bel Ami (1971), as Suzanne Walter
- The Regiment (1972–1973), as Charlotte Gaunt
- Napoleon and Love (1974), as Madame Tallien
- Man About the House (1975), as Susan
- King Lear (BBC, 1976), as Cordelia
- John Macnab (1976), as Agatha Raden
- Juliet Bravo (series 1, 1980), as Jennie Randall
- Sorry!, as Annette (series 1) and Jennifer (series 6)
- Dear John (1987), as Wendy
