= Waiting for the Sunrise =

Studio album by Camille Thurman
- Released: August 24, 2018
- Studio: Hirsch Center
- Genre: Jazz
- Length: 50:53
- Label: Chesky
- Producer: David Chesky

Camille Thurman chronology
Inside the Moment (2017)	Waiting for the Sunrise (2018)

Waiting for the Sunrise is the fourth album by American jazz vocalist and saxophone player Camille Thurman. It was released by Chesky Records on August 24, 2018, and debuted at No. 2 on the Billboard magazine Traditional Jazz Album Chart.

NPR called the album a "full display" of Thurman's talents on vocals and saxophone, and JazzTimes said "track for track, the recording is a revelation."

== Awards ==
- 17th Independent Music Award - Jazz Album with Vocals - Waiting for the Sunrise
- 17th Independent Music Award - Jazz Song with Vocals - "The Nearness of You"
- NAACP 50th Image Awards Nominated - Outstanding Jazz Album

== Track listing ==
1. "I Just Found Out About Love" – 3:26
2. "Some of These Days" – 6:31
3. "Tarde" – 3:32
4. "After You've Gone" – 7:41
5. "September in the Rain" – 4:44
6. "The Nearness of You" – 5:03
7. "Easy to Love" – 3:03
8. "I'm on Your Side" – 5:42
9. "World Waiting for Sunrise" – 7:21
10. "If You Love Me (Really Love Me)" – 3:59

== Personnel ==
- Camille Thurman - vocals, tenor saxophone
- Jeremy Pelt - trumpet
- Jack Wilkins - guitar
- Cecil McBee - bass
- Steve Williams - drums
- David Chesky - producer
- Norman Chesky - producer
