= Alexia Gardner =

- Born: Alexia Elewise Gardner; 2 August 1968 (age 58); Birmingham, England, UK
- Education: Royal Central School of Speech and Drama
- Occupations: Singer; songwriter; record producer
- Spouse: Markus Benz (m. 2002)
- Parent: Owen and Gloria Gardner
- Relatives: Paula Gardner(sister); Anthony Gardner (brother); Alexia Hope Diamany(niece)
- Musical career
- Genres: Jazz; R&B; Reggae
- Website: alexiajazz.com

Alexia Elowise Benz-Gardner (born 2 August 1968) is a British-Jamaican singer, songwriter, and record producer. Born and raised in Birmingham, England and Kingston, Jamaica, she performed in various singing competitions and church events as a child. Both of which were performed with her sister, Paula, in a duo called, "High Profile". After the two sisters went their separate ways, Alexia debuted her first studio album Rest of your life (2002). Which was followed by Jammin (2005), the last album recorded in Shanghai, China before her move to Switzerland.

Following the move in 2005, she released her only album recorded with the Offbeat Trio (a Swiss Based Band), Chasing Hope (2009), which landed Alexia a nomination for two Grammys; Best New Artist and Best Jazz Album which was followed by her latest album, A Little Closer (2011).

Alexia has also not forgotten her drama links, after graduating from Central School of Speech and Drama, Alexia appeared in multiple small plays before debuting in Switzerland as Aida in the musical, Aida. However, after 8 years in Switzerland, Alexia and her manager/husband, Markus, relocated to New York City, where she held her New York debut titled, Alexia Gardner in Manhattan on Broadway in September 2015 which succeeded the release of her documentary of the same title which followed Alexia's career so far and her life in the Big Apple.

== Early life ==
Alexia Elowise Gardner was born in Birmingham, England to Gloria Gardner, a chef and later a restaurateur, and Owen Gardner, a welder. Alexia's name is a tribute to her grandfather on her mother's side; Alexander. Alexia was the first born and has two younger siblings Paula (1969) and Anthony (1971). After being born in the U.K, the three children moved in with their aunt and uncle in Jamaica and lived there for 5 years before returning to their hometown.

In her childhood, Alexia and Paula would often sing at church services and events before the two became a duo, "High Profile". With their parents supporting them, Paula took Piano lessons and Alexia took Singing lessons bringing both skills to the duo. After the better half of their childhood and teenage years as a duo, with University on the horizon both sisters went their separate ways Paula becoming a teacher and Alexia continuing her musical and drama interests and attended Central School of Speech and Drama.

== Career ==
=== 1989–2005: Cruise Ships and Asia ===
After graduating for CSSD in 1989, Alexia started teaching in schools in her hometown putting her dreams on hold momentarily, however after a few years she took up the opportunity to be the entertainment on a cruise liner in 1996 (MS Sapphire).

In the late 1990s/early 2000s, Alexia started her journey in Asia starting with a hotel residency in Hong Kong then Singapore (here she and her sister sang the South African National Anthem for Nelson Mandela) and after Jakarta, she spent the longest time in Shanghai after marrying the love of her life Markus Benz who then became her manager.

The move to Shanghai was pivotal, as she released her debut album "Rest of your Life" in 2002, which boosted her presence in Shanghai and Alexia started rubbing shoulders with the "Big Wigs" in the jazz circuit in Shanghai.

=== 2006–2014: Goodbye Shanghai, Hello Switzerland ===
In July 2006, after the release of her second album "Jammin", Alexia moved to Switzerland (her husband's homeland), she hit the ground running, with the collaboration with the Offbeat Trio and the creation of the Alexia Gardner Trio which performed with her on multiple gigs in Switzerland, France, Germany and Austria.

The next album in 2009, "Chasing Hope" was nominated for two Grammys in the same year. This album was with the Offbeat Trio and also was awarded the Swiss Jazz Award in 2011. The album was 14 tracks long and included a lot of Jazz Classics as well as original songs including Chasing Hope (the title track). The inspiration for the song came from the move from Shanghai to Switzerland after living very close to her sister and niece, Paula and Alexia Hope and after moving missed her niece very much. Her family was also featured on the album, on the track "Island in the Sun" both Paula and Alexia Hope (credited at Hope Diamany) were the harmonies on the song while Paula appeared on another track "moon river".

In between Alexia's second and third albums, Alexia took a brief break and took to the stage as the Nubian princess, Aida in the musical of the same name put on by the West Side Singers Switzerland.

The third album "A little closer" was the last album recorded in Switzerland with one of the singles being about her not yet confirmed move to New York. After confirming the move, Alexia began a brief Swiss Tour where she sang her most loved hits, her final show being packed and sold out.

=== 2014–present: Alexia Gardner in Manhattan and Hanging with Mr. Man ===
Alexia moved from Switzerland to New York in 2014 and after approximately 10 months in the states, Alexia debuted in New York (September 2015) where she performed for the first time at Symphony Space surrounded by fans, long time friends and family. A few months after which, in association with Little River Productions, Alexia released her documentary titled, "Alexia Gardner in Manhattan" reflecting her life and her music

In early 2016, Alexia announced that she would be releasing her fourth album, sometime in the near future titled, "Hanging with Mr. Man"

== Personal life ==
=== Family ===
Music is central to Alexia's family life; her sister, niece, father, and cousins are all musicians. It's no wonder that she often showcases her family members at events. For instance, on New Year's 2012–13, Alexia collaborated with her niece Alexia Hope for a duet version of "Mo betta blues," and her niece performed a rendition of Alicia Keys' "No one." Alexia and her husband have deep connections with Switzerland, fostering a strong relationship with the Swiss Consulate in New York, which sponsored her debut.

== Artistry ==
=== Voice ===
It's who you are

— Alexia Gardner when asked what quote described her career, voice and music

Alexia's vocal range spans three octaves. She has said on multiple occasions that her music is Jazz or a Jazz fusion with elements of R&B, Pop and Reggae all fused together.

=== Influences ===
Alexia names her influences as Barbra Streisand because she "taught me (Alexia) that my voice was my instrument and I have to care for it.", although in the starting of her career she was influenced by Diana Ross and later Sarah Vaughn.

== Discography ==
Year	Album	Notes
2002	Rest of Your Life	Debut Album
2006	Jammin	
2009	Chasing Hope	Nominated for two Grammys Swiss Jazz Award Winner
2011	A Little Closer	
2016–	Hanging with Mr. Man	In production
