= Mimi Jones =

American jazz bassist and educator (born 1972)

- Jones in 2025

Background information
- Born: Miriam Sullivan; March 25, 1972 (age 54)
- Origin: New York City, U.S.
- Genres: Jazz
- Occupations: Musician; composer; bandleader; music educator
- Instruments: Double bass; vocals
- Years active: 1990s–present
- Label: Hot Tone Music
- Website: mimijonesmusic.com

Mimi Jones (born March 25, 1972, in New York City) is an American jazz bassist, vocalist, composer, bandleader, educator, and founder of the record label Hot Tone Music.

== Early life ==
Mimi Jones was born Miriam Sullivan in New York City and was raised in the Bronx. She attended the Harlem School of the Arts and Fiorello H. LaGuardia High School. She studied with Linda McKnight and attended the Jazz Mobile Workshop. There, she studied with bassist Lisle Atkinson, who became her mentor.

She later received a full scholarship to the Manhattan School of Music conservatory in New York, where she attended workshops by Charles Davis, Barry Haris, Yusef Latif, Max Roach, and other prominent jazz figures, and later graduated from the conservatory.

== Career ==
For over two decades, Jones has worked as a sidewoman and as leader, with three CDs on her own record label, Hot Tone Music. Her music incorporated a range of genres, with a foundation in jazz.

She has toured throughout Africa, Asia, Europe, South America, and the Caribbean, and is recognized as a U.S. Jazz Ambassador. As a sidewoman, she has performed with Kenny Barron, Frank Ocean, Dianne Reeves, Tia Fuller, Ingrid Jensen, Dee Dee Bridgewater, Marc Cary, Toshi Reagon, Rachel Z, Sean Jones, Ravi Coltrane, and Terri Lyne Carrington's Grammy-winning Mosaic Project.

Alongside ArcoIris Sandoval, Jones has also served as co-director of the D.O.M.E. Experience, a multimedia project "created to inspire its audience to become aware of environmental and social issues, within the community and globally, through choreography, composition, and cinematography."

== Discography ==
=== As leader/co-leader ===
- 2009: A New Day (Hot Tone Music HTM 101)
- 2013: Balance (Hot Tone Music HTM 103)
- 2016: Feet in the Mud (Hot Tone Music HTM 108)

With Allegra Levy, Carmen Staaf, and Allison Miller

- Out of the Question (SteepleChase SCCD 31961)
