= 59E59 Theaters =

Theatrical venues in Manhattan, New York

Coordinates: 40.763442°N 73.970489°W

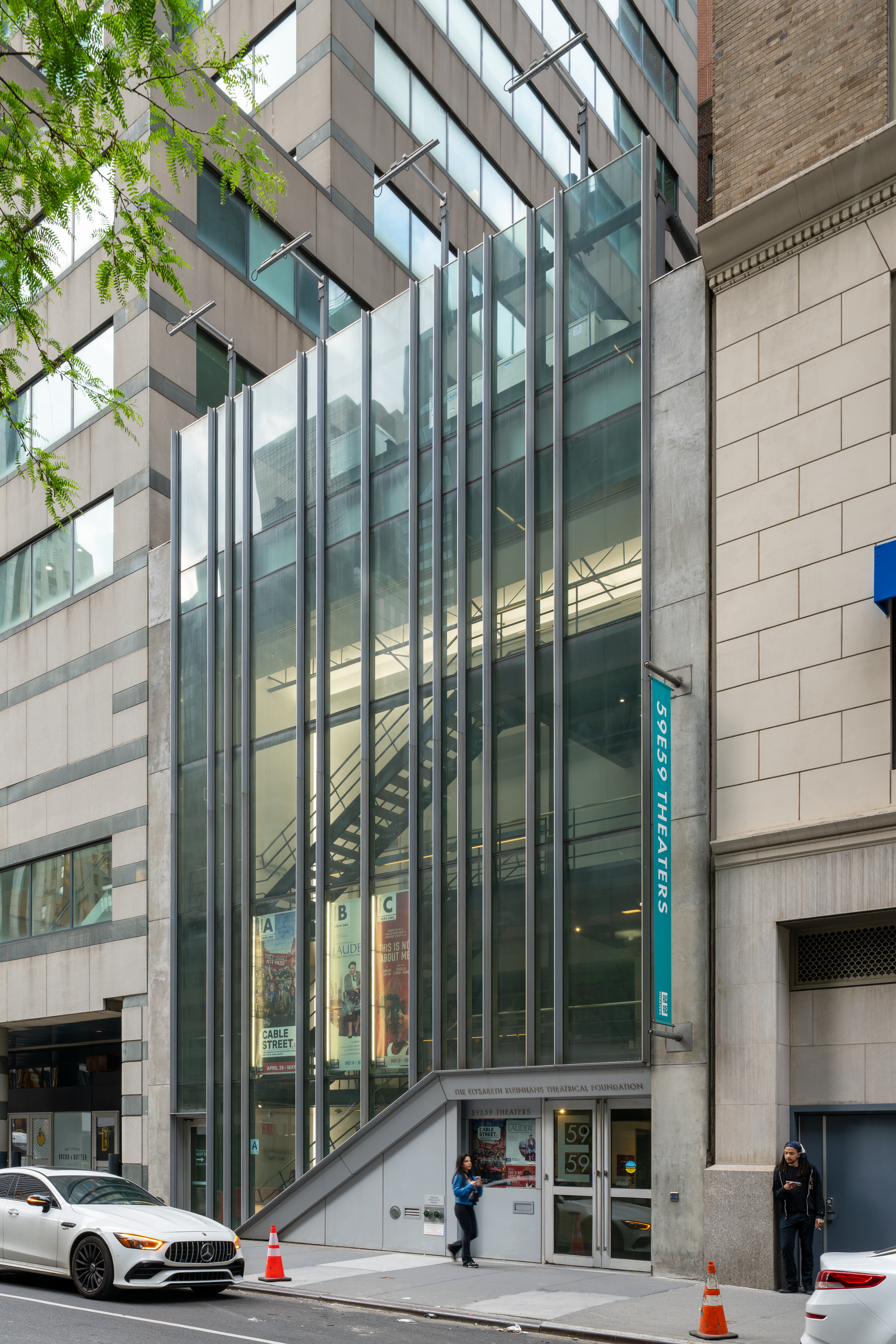
- Exterior of 59E59 Theaters building
- Interactive map of 59E59 Theaters
- Address: 59 E 59th St; New York
- Owner: Elysabeth Kleinhans Theatrical Foundation
- Capacity: Theater A 196, Theater B 98, Theater C 50–70, respectively
- Type: Off-Broadway, Off-off-Broadway

Construction
- Opened: 2004
- Architect: Leo Modrcin

Website
- http://www.59e59.org

59E59 Theaters is a live theatrical venue at 59 East 59th Street in Midtown Manhattan, New York City, United States. The building's three stages host both off-Broadway (in Theater A) and off-off-Broadway productions (in Theaters B and C). The complex is owned and operated by the Elysabeth Kleinhans Theatrical Foundation, a not-for-profit foundation.

== History ==
Elysabeth Kleinhans established the Elysabeth Kleinhans Theatrical Foundation to create a new theater complex in East Midtown Manhattan. In 2002, the building at 59 East 59th Street was donated to the Foundation. The building was soon renovated, creating three new theaters: Theater A (the largest), Theater B, and Theater C. The new building and its theaters were designed by architect, Leo Modrcin.

59E59 Theaters opened its inaugural season in February 2004 with a production of The Stendhal Syndrome produced by then resident company, Primary Stages, in Theater A. Shortly following, in April 2004, the other two spaces, Theater B and Theater C, opened their doors with the Theaters' first annual Brits Off Broadway—a festival dedicated to premiering new work by Off Broadway-style British companies.

Since 2004, the theaters have been continuously occupied with shows running from three to seven weeks. They run about 30 productions every year.

In 2017, Elysabeth Kleinhans and Peter Tear stepped down from their roles, and Val Day, a longtime agent with William Morris and ICM, was appointed as Artistic Director. With the addition of a new Artistic Director, 59E59 Theaters moved to the final phase of transitioning from the founding team to a traditional theater management structure, a process which started in 2012 with the appointment of Brian Beirne as Managing Director.

In 2024, 59E59 Theatres celebrated its 20th Anniversary. In celebration of this, the Elysabeth Kleinhans Theatrical Foundation made a $10 million donation to make the performance spaces and equipment rental-free for incoming productions and theater companies.

=== Brits Off Broadway Season ===
Brits Off Broadway is an annual season showcasing work from the United Kingdom. The Season usually takes place during the months of April, May, and June and comprises between 6 and 9 productions across the three theater spaces.

The inaugural Brits Off Broadway Season launched in April 2004. The first festival featured Tim Crouch's My Arm, Frantic Assembly and the Mu Lan Theatre Company's Heavenly, Sun is Shining, and Plaines Plough and John Tiffany's The Straits.

In 2006, Charles Isherwood of The New York Times hailed the festival as "a highlight of the theatrical year in New York." Past seasons have seen work by Richard Bean (One Man, Two Guvnors) and Alan Ayckbourn (The Norman Conquests, Bedroom Farce) amongst other notable British playwrights.

59E59 also hosts an annual festival called East to Edinburgh, a preview of new plays going to the Edinburgh Festival Fringe from North America.

== Design ==
59E59 has three theater spaces. Theater A, the largest of the three, features off-Broadway shows for six-week runs. It has proscenium seating with 189 seats. Theater B and Theater C both feature off-off-Broadway shows for 3-5 week runs. Theater B has 98 seats with proscenium seating. Theater C has a flexible seating layout, with one-sided seating possible with 48 seats, or two-sided seating possible with 53 seats.

All three theaters were designed by architect Leo Modrcin with the intention of creating an "inviting ambiance." The street facade features a glazed metal curtain and laminated wire glass. It is three stories tall, with the lobby and stairwell visible from the outside.

== Recognition ==
In 2008, 59E59 Theaters was awarded a Drama Desk Award for Excellence in Theater.

== Notable productions ==
- The Immortal Jellyfish Girl (2023) - Drama Desk Nomination
- The Stendhal Syndrome by Terrence McNally (2004) - First production
- The Lucky Star (2022) - Longest-running production
