= Esperanza Spalding discography =

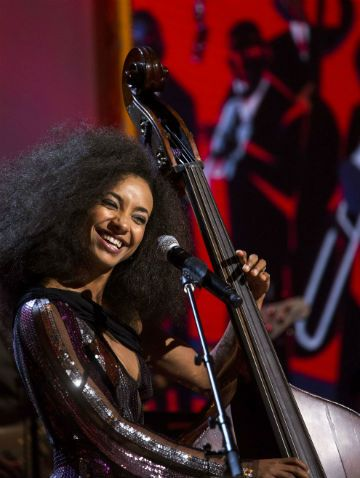
- Studio albums: 8
- Soundtrack albums: 3
- Live albums: 2
- Music videos: 20
- Collaborations: 11

The discography of American musician and singer Esperanza Spalding includes 8 studio albums, 2 live albums, 11 guest appearances, and 20 music videos.

== Albums ==
=== Studio albums ===
List of studio albums, with selected chart positions
Title	Album details	Peak chart positions						
Title	Album details	US	US Jazz	FRA	NLD	NOR	SWE	SWI
Junjo	Released: April 18, 2006; Label: Ayva Musica; Formats: CD, LP, digital download	—	—	—	—	—	—	—
Esperanza	Released: May 20, 2008; Label: Heads Up International; Formats: CD, digital download	138	3	—	—	12	37	—
Chamber Music Society	Released: August 17, 2010; Label: Heads Up International; Formats: CD, LP, digital download	34	1	92	50	13	—	—
Radio Music Society	Released: March 20, 2012; Label: Heads Up International; Formats: CD, digital download	10	1	54	59	33	—	75
Emily's D+Evolution	Released: March 4, 2016; Label: Concord; Formats: CD, digital download, vinyl	88	1	181	175	—	—	—
Exposure	Released: December 16, 2017; Label: Concord; Formats: Limited edition CD (only 7,777 copies pressed)	—	—	—	—	—	—	—
12 Little Spells	Released: October 19, 2018; Label: Concord; Formats: CD, digital download, vinyl, streaming	—	1	—	—	—	—	—
Songwrights Apothecary Lab	Released: September 24, 2021; Label: Concord; Formats: CD, digital download, vinyl, streaming	—	11	—	—	—	—	—
Milton + esperanza (with Milton Nascimento)	To be released (August 9, 2024)	—	—	—	—	—	—	—

=== Live albums ===
List of live albums, with selected chart positions
Title	Album details
Live at the Detroit Jazz Festival	Released: September 9, 2022; Label: Candid; Formats: CD, digital download, vinyl, streaming
Alive at the Village Vanguard	Released: January 6, 2023; Label: Palmetto; Formats: CD, digital download, vinyl, streaming

== EPs ==
Title	Details
Live at the Village Vanguard - Rough Mix	Released: May 9, 2020; Label: Bandcamp; Formats: Digital download, limited release
Triangle	Released: April 3, 2021; Label: Concord Records; Formats: Digital download

== Singles ==
Title	Year	Peak chart positions		Album
Title	Year	US Adult R&B	JPN	Album
"Little Fly"	2010	—	—	Chamber Music Society
"Black Gold"	2012	26	21	Radio Music Society
"Radio Song"	2012	—	—	Radio Music Society
"Crowned & Kissed"	2012	—	—	Radio Music Society
"One"	2016	—	—	Emily's D+Evolution
"Unconditional Love"	2016	—	—	Emily's D+Evolution
"Lest We Forget"	2019	—	—	12 Little Spells
“Outubro” (with Milton Nascimento)	2024	—	—	Milton + esperanza
“Um Vento Passou” (with Milton Nascimento and Paul Simon)	2024	—	—	Milton + esperanza

== Guest appearances ==
List of guest appearances on albums
Title	Album details
Blanket Music (with Noise for Pretend)	Release date: October 30, 2001; Label: Hush
Happy You Near (with Noise for Pretend)	Release date: July 2, 2002; Label: Hush
Transfiguration of Vincent (M. Ward)	Release date: March 18, 2003; Label: Merge
Duende (with Nando Michelin)	Release date: November 21, 2006; Label: Fresh Sound New Talent
The Toys of Men (Stanley Clarke)	Release date: October 16, 2007; Label: Heads Up International
Folk Art (Joe Lovano & Us Five)	Release date: May 5, 2009; Label: Blue Note
Big Neighborhood (Mike Stern)	Release date: August 11, 2009; Label: Heads Up International
Reencontro (with Nando Michelin)	Release date: January 4, 2010; Label: Blue Music Group
Mwaliko (with Lionel Loueke)	Release date: 9 February 2010; Label: Blue Note
Bird Songs (with Joe Lovano & Us Five)	Release date: 2011; Label: Blue Note
Sound Travels (with Jack DeJohnette)	Release date: January 17, 2012; Label: Golden Beams/eOne
Cross Culture (with Joe Lovano & Us Five)	Release date: January 8, 2013; Label: Blue Note
The Electric Lady (with Janelle Monáe)	Release date: September 6, 2013; Label: Bad Boy Records
A Legendary Christmas (with John Legend)	Release Date: October 26, 2018; Label: Columbia
Waiting Game (with Terri Lyne Carrington + Social Science)	Release date: November 8, 2019; Label: Motema Music
Triune (with Nicholas Payton & Karriem Riggins)	Release date: August 29, 2025; Label: Smoke Sessions Records

== Music videos ==
List of music videos date released
Song	Release date
"Little Fly"	July 15, 2011
"Black Gold"	January 31, 2012
"Radio Song"	March 19, 2012
"Crowned & Kissed"	June 29, 2012
"I Can't Help It"	July 3, 2012
"We Are America"	November 18, 2013
"Good Lava"	January 8, 2016
"One"	February 25, 2016
"12 Little Spells"	October 19, 2018
"To Tide Us Over"	October 19, 2018
"Until the Next Full"	October 19, 2018
"Thang"	October 19, 2018
"Touch in Mine"	October 19, 2018
"The Longing Deep Down"	October 19, 2018
"You Have to Dance"	October 19, 2018
"Now Know"	October 19, 2018
"All Limbs Are"	October 19, 2018
"Readying to Rise"	October 19, 2018
"Dancing the Animal"	October 19, 2018
"With Others"	October 19, 2018
"Outubro"	May 15, 2024
