= Ganavya =

Indian and American singer, songwriter, and musician

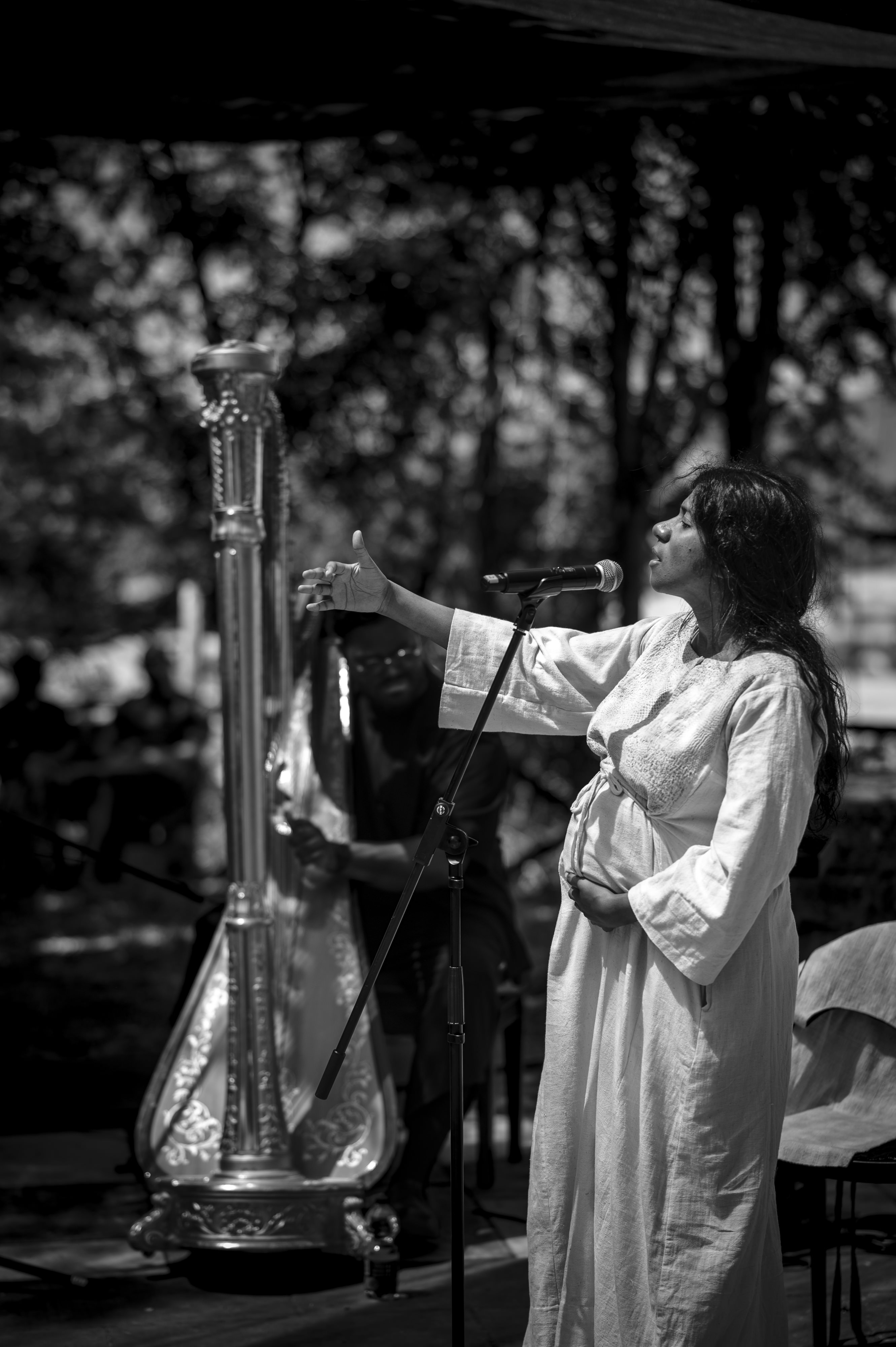
- Ganavya performing in 2026.

Background information
- Born: Ganavya Doraiswamy; July 21, 1991; New York City, United States
- Website: www.ganavya.com

Ganavya Doraiswamy (born 1991), stylized professionally as ganavya, is an Indian and American singer, songwriter, and musician. She has released four albums, most recently Nilam in 2025, and has collaborated with musicians including Quincy Jones, A. R. Rahman, and Esperanza Spalding.

== Biography ==
Ganavya Doraiswamy was born on July 21, 1991, in New York City, United States. When she was 7, her family moved to the town of Senkottai, and then later to Chennai, the capital of the South Indian state of Tamil Nadu. In India, Ganavya learned to play jalatharangam from her grandmother Seetha Doraiswamy, and studied Carnatic music and Bharatanatyam. Her mother practiced the Pandharpur Wari. She has one brother.

Ganavya was homeschooled for portions of her childhood instead prioritizing arts training, but later obtained undergraduate degrees in theater and psychology at Florida International University at 19. She then worked briefly as a rehabilitation counselor at Everglades Correctional Institution in Florida before earning a graduate degree at Berklee College of Music. After graduating, Ganavya taught a course on South Asian music at Berklee Valencia.

She has a graduate degree in Ethnomusicology from UCLA and a Ph.D. in Creative Practice and Critical Inquiry from Harvard University, where she helped lead the Songwrights Apothecary Lab, an experimental music-based research lab founded by Spalding. Her dissertation advisors were Esperanza Spalding and Claire Chase, with committee members including Peter Sellars.

She co-founded the We Have Voice Collective.

== Career ==
In 2015, Ganavya recorded Aikyam: Onnu, a collection of jazz standards, which she translated to her native language of Tamil, and abhangs. The album was released in 2018.

In 2024, Ganavya released her second album like the sky I've been too quiet, co-produced by Shabaka Hutchings, and named after a line from a poem by Kaveh Akbar. Her third album Daughter of a Temple was recorded in 2022 at the Moores Opera House with over 40 featured musicians including Esperanza Spalding, Wayne Shorter, Shabaka Hutchings, Immanuel Wilkins, Rasika Shekar and Vijay Iyer and was released at the end of 2024 on Leiter. The album is a selection of material from a week-long gathering, with initial decisions being made by Ganavya and Spalding, with the final round of mixing being led by Nils Frahm in Funkhaus Berlin. Daughter of a Temple was Giles Peterson's Best Album of the Year, and was named by The Guardian as one of the best global albums of 2024. Her fourth album Nilam was released in 2025, and features vocals in Tamil, English, and Old Marathi. In 2025, a track from Nilam titled "Pasayadan" was listed as Barack Obama's favorite tracks of the year. Nilam was Songlines Album of the Year.

Ganavya has collaborated with Quincy Jones, Nils Frahm, Esperanza Spalding, Immanuel Wilkins, A.R. Rahman, Charles Lloyd, Alfredo Rodríguez, Shabaka Hutchings, Joy Harjo, and Lauren Groff. She is a solo vocalist on multiple Grammy Award winning tracks, notably for Songwrights Apothecary Lab, for which she helped create a lab by the same name at Harvard led by Spalding, and for having written and sung the first Tamil lyrics to win a Latin Grammy for Residente's "Antes Que El Mundo Se Acabe". She has a longstanding collaborative relationship with Peter Sellars, most recently having co-created an opera titled Nine Jewelled Deer with set design by Julie Mehretu.

== Albums ==
- Aikyam: Onnu (2018)
- like the sky I've been too quiet (2024)
- Daughter of a Temple (2024)
- Nilam (2025)
