= Noturno Copacabana =

2003 album by Guinga

Studio album by Guinga
- Released: 2003
- Recorded: April–May 2003
- Genre: MPB
- Length: 56:10
- Label: Velas
- Producer: Paulinho Albuquerque

Guinga chronology
Cine Baronesa (2001)	Noturno Copacabana (2003)	Graffiando Vento (2004)

Noturno Copacabana is a Brazilian popular music album by Brazilian musician Guinga, released by the label Velas in 2003. It was nominated for a Latin Grammy for Best Brazilian Popular Music Album at the 2004 ceremony.

== Background ==
Released in 2003 by the Velas label, Noturno Copacabana marks the sixth studio album by Brazilian musician Guinga, ten years after his album Delírio Carioca, released in 1993. Born in the Madureira neighborhood in Rio de Janeiro and a resident of Leblon, Guinga stated in an interview with journalist Luciana Ribeiro of Jornal do Brasil that the album dates back to when he moved into a “tiny apartment on Rua Barata Ribeiro", marking his arrival in Copacabana.

Regarding the neighborhood, he stated, “Copacabana is the essence of Brazil, with all its colorful characters, from prostitutes to luminaries like Oscar Niemeyer. When I lived there, my refrigerator was in the living room; I was just starting my career as a dentist, but I put down roots in the South Zone, from which I’ve never left.” To journalist Carlos Calado of Folha de S.Paulo, he stated that he had no qualms about “showing his more feminine, more passionate side.”

The album features songs by Paulo César Pinheiro, Aldir Blanc, Simone Guimarães, Francisco Bosco, and Mauro Aguiar. In an interview with journalist Elisa Rosa of Jornal do Commercio, he stated that it took two years to record the album.

== Track listing ==
No.	Title	Writer(s)	Length
1.	"Garoa e Maresia"	Guinga	3:15
2.	"Abluesado"	Guinga / Aldir Blanc	5:05
3.	"Silêncio de Iara" (with Ana Luiza)	Guinga / Luis Felipe Gama	4:06
4.	"Desavença"	Guinga / Simone Guimarães	3:01
5.	"Noturno Copacabana"	Guinga / Francisco Bosco	4:32
6.	"Depois do Sonho"	Guinga / Luis Felipe Gama	5:11
7.	"Concubinato" (with Fátima Guedes)	Guinga / Mauro Aguiar	3:27
8.	"Senhorinha"	Guinga / Paulo César Pinheiro	5:21
9.	"Na Surdina"	Guinga	3:45
10.	"Rasgando Seda"	Guinga / Simone Guimarães	4:06
11.	"Pra Jackson e Almira"	Guinga / Simone Guimarães	3:18
12.	"Fonte Abandonada" (with Leila Pinheiro / Quarteto Maogani)	Guinga / Paulo César Pinheiro	3:31
13.	"Dichavado"	Guinga	3:37
14.	"Canção Desnecessária"	Guinga / Mauro Aguiar	3:50
Total length:			56:10

== Reception ==
=== Critics ===
Journalist and music critic Tárik de Souza, writing for Jornal do Brasil, gave the album a positive review, stating that it “exudes erudition and depth across various forms of Brazilian popular music and adds a few more bricks to a solid body of work built without the frivolity of fleeting fame.” Julinho Bittencourt, writing for the newspaper A Tribuna, gave the album a very positive review and added, “Guinga’s Noturno Copacabana is music for grown-ups. It embodies the kind of country we want, far removed from what we have. It is centered on the music, without gimmicks, tricks, flashy outfits, or glitter. It is crafted with the utmost care and affection.”

According to the newspaper O Fluminense, when the musician Chico Buarque heard the track O Silêncio de Iara, he called Guinga and told him it was the “song of the century.”

=== Prizes ===
In 2004, the album was nominated for a Latin Grammy Award for Best MPB Album. At the ceremony held at the Shrine Auditorium in Los Angeles, California, the album ended the night with a nomination, losing out to the debut album Maria Rita by singer Maria Rita.

Year	Award	Category	Venue	Result	Ref.
2004	Latin Grammy Awards	Best MPB album	Shrine Auditorium, Los Angeles, California, United States	Nominated	

== Tour ==
To celebrate the album’s release, a series of concerts was held in various cities, including Brasília, São Paulo, Rio de Janeiro, and Curitiba, as well as in Perugia, at the Umbria Jazz Festival in Italy.

== Personnel ==
The following musicians contributed to the album:

- Guinga – guitar, vocals
- Lula Galvão – guitar
- Jorge Helder – bass
- Carlos Malta – flute
- Nailor Proveta – alto saxophone
- Paulo Sérgio Santos – clarinet, bass clarinet, alto saxophone
- Jessé Sadoc – flugelhorn, trumpet
- Nelson Oliveira – trumpet
- Sérgio de Jesus – trombone
- Bocão – trombone
- João Cortez – drums
- Armando Marçal – percussion
- Gilson Peranzzetta – accordion
- David Chew – cello
- Marcus Ribeiro Oliveira – cello
- Marie Christine Springuel – viola
- Jesuína Noronha Passaroto – viola
- Fátima Guedes – vocals
- Leila Pinheiro – vocals
- Quarteto Maogani – viola
- Ana Luiza – vocals
