= Emily Elbert =

American singer-songwriter

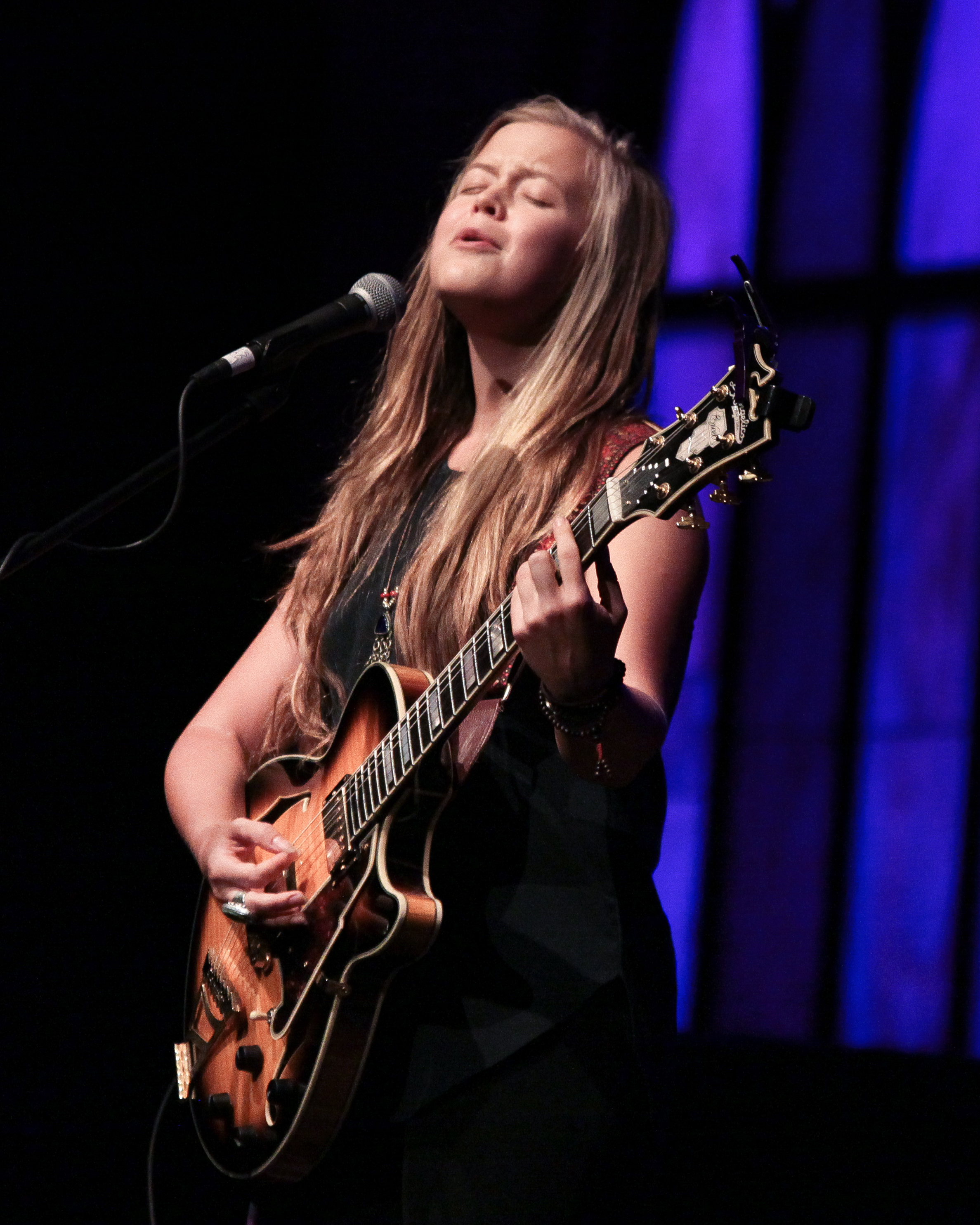
- Emily Elbert in Plymouth, Massachusetts (Denise Maccaferri photography)

Background information
- Born: Emily Caroline Elbert; December 21, 1988 (age 37); Dallas, Texas, U.S.
- Genres: Folk, soul, jazz, pop
- Occupation: Singer-songwriter
- Instruments: Vocals, guitar
- Years active: 2006–present
- Website: www.emilyelbert.com

Emily Caroline Elbert (born December 21, 1988) is an American singer-songwriter and guitarist.

Elbert was a member of Esperanza Spalding's experimental jazz and theater project from 2015 to 2016. The band toured internationally and recorded Emily's D+Evolution. In 2019, she joined the band of songwriter Jenny Lewis. In 2022 she joined Jacob Collier's band, undertaking a world tour. Elbert has also worked with Lorde, Sara Bareilles, Mike Gordon of Phish, Dweezil Zappa, and Bruno Major, and is currently in the touring band of Leon Bridges.

== Biography ==
Elbert was born in Dallas, Texas. Early influences cited include Antonio Carlos Jobim, Stevie Wonder, James Taylor, and Jimi Hendrix. She recorded her first album Bright Side while in high school, paid for by local gigs and crowd-funding, and began touring the U.S. independently. At 18, Elbert was awarded a full scholarship to Berklee College of Music. While there, she continued to tour nationally and internationally, and released two more independent albums, Proof, and Alive, In Love, both of which were also crowd-funded. In 2010, Glamour magazine named Elbert one of their Top 10 College Women of the Year. In 2013, Elbert released Evolve, an EP recorded at Brooklyn, New York's Mason Jar Music.

Since then, Elbert released several singles: "Letting Go" (2016), "Here and Now" (2016) and "True Power" (2017), a protest song about Donald Trump, benefitting the American Civil Liberties Union. In a press release, Elbert spoke about "True Power": "My love for rhythm, harmony, and story sharing is woven in with my compassion for the Earth and its people. Songs can be powerful tools used in their defense... As a young, queer, woman, an environmentalist, and someone who believes in equality and human rights for people of all races, faiths, and cultural backgrounds, I can’t sit back and be a silent witness to injustice. ...Donald Trump may have bought and bullied his way into the presidency, but true power is in the hands of the people when they come together. That’s what this song is about." Elbert released a full album of music focused on social justice, We Who Believe in Freedom, in October 2018.

Her sixth independent album, Woven Together, was released in August 2022. In 2023, Elbert joined Norah Jones on a 10-date U.K. and Ireland tour, as her opening act.

== Events and touring ==
Elbert has performed in more than 35 countries, and opened for artists including Norah Jones, Emily King, Nick Hakim, Big Thief, Richie Havens, Victor Wooten, Leon Russell, Kaki King, The Wood Brothers, G. Love & Special Sauce, Tuck & Patti, Jorge Drexler, Bruno Major, Moonchild, Robben Ford, Los Angeles Guitar Quartet, Joan Osborne. and Jacob Collier.

As a supporting musician, Elbert has played in the touring bands of Esperanza Spalding, Jenny Lewis, Jacob Collier, and Leon Bridges. She also performed on television specials and other events with Sara Bareilles, Lorde, and Mike Gordon of Phish, and in the opening sequence of Beyoncé's 2024 Beyoncé Bowl.

== Discography ==
- Bright Side (Full Sun, 2006)
- Proof (2010)
- Alive, in Love (2011)
- Evolve (2013)
- Letting Go / Here and Now (2016)
- True Power (2017)
- We Who Believe in Freedom (2018)
- Woven Together (2022)

=== As guest ===
- Via Zammata - Dweezil Zappa (2015)
- Emily's D+Evolution - Esperanza Spalding (2016)
- Dakar Suite - Leni Stern (2016)

=== As writer ===
- A Song for Every Moon - Bruno Major (2017)
- To Let a Good Thing Die - Bruno Major (2020)
- Columbo - Bruno Major (2023)
