= Raymond Angry =

American keyboardist and record producer

- Raymond Angry performing at the 2026 FIFA World Cup on July 4, 2026 with The Roots

Background information
- Also known as: Mr. Goldfinger
- Born: July 4, 1972 (age 54); Albany, Georgia, U.S.
- Origin: Miami, Florida, U.S.
- Genres: Pop, Soul, R&B, Jazz
- Occupations: Musician, songwriter, arranger, producer
- Instruments: Piano, Keyboards, Hammond organ, Fender Rhodes, Clavinet, Moog synthesizer, Farfisa organ, Wurlitzer, Keytar
- Years active: 1994–present
- Member of: The Roots, The Tonight Show Band, The Council of Goldfinger
- Website: https://rayangry.com

Raymond "Ray" Angry (b. July 4, 1972) is an American keyboardist, record producer, and composer known for his work across soul, R&B, pop, and jazz. Angry also uses the alias "Mister Goldfinger". He has joined the hip-hop band The Roots on tour and in The Tonight Show Band on The Tonight Show Starring Jimmy Fallon.

Since the 1990s, Angry has contributed songs and played on many hit records. He wrote Christina Aguilera's "Slow Down Baby", Ja Rule's "Real Life Fantasy" and Melanie Fiona's "Priceless". Angry has collaborated with notable acts including Cindy Blackman, Mike Mangini, Tom "Bones" Malone, David Gilmore, Betty Wright and James Poyser. He has also worked with Patti LaBelle, Louie Vega, Jeremiah, Mobb Deep, Elvis Costello, Peter Gallagher and Elliott Yamin. He also played on records by Robbie Williams, Joss Stone and has toured with D'Angelo. He released his first album as lead artist, One in 2018, followed by Ray Angry Three in 2023.

== Early life ==
Ray Angry was born in Albany, Georgia on July 4, 1972. Growing up in Miami, his first instrument was the baritone tuba, followed by the French horn. Angry started playing piano around age five in church and arts programs in Miami, Florida. He attended Norland Middle School, and auditioned to then attend the New World School of the Arts. His early musical education focused on classical piano, with Angry performing in piano recitals and competitions, citing inspiration from composers Johann Sebastian Bach, Sergei Rachmaninoff, and Thomas Whitfield.

Angry attended Howard University, pursuing a double major in Classical and Jazz Piano. He took a leave of absence to pursue a world tour with the band Shai from 1992-1994, before re-enrolling to matriculate.

== Career ==
Ray Angry's first live recording was on Yolanda Adams's 1996 album, Live in Washington, on a Hammond B-3 organ. In the 2000s, he began regularly sitting in as a studio musician for major recording artists in New York, NY, including the artists Joss Stone, Christina Aguilera, Mark Ronson, and others.

In 2010, Angry was the musical director for Off the Wall: A Michael Jackson Tribute. In 2013 he received a Grammy nomination as part of The Roots' record Undun.

In 2018, Ray Angry's debut LP album One, was recorded live to analog tape at Reservoir Studio in New York. Angry performed songs from the album on The Tonight Show Starring Jimmy Fallon in October, 2018.

In August 2020, Angry contributed to the live streamed recording of the singer Bilal's EP VOYAGE-19, created remotely during the COVID-19 pandemic lockdowns. It was released the following month with proceeds from its sales going to participating musicians in financial hardship from the pandemic.

=== Producer Mondays ===
Angry has hosted the creative platform and thinktank for art, "Producer Mondays" weekly at Nublu Club in New York since 2018. The event series includes a mixture of professional musicians and up-and-coming artist drop-ins, with a focus on cross-genre, original music.

== Studio Recordings ==
=== Albums - As lead artist ===
Title	Release date	Label	Format	Features
Ray Angry Three	2023	J.M.I. Recordings	vinyl, digital	
One	2018	J.M.I. Recordings	vinyl, digital	Myron Walden (trumpet/flute), Ambrose Akinmusire (trumpet), Derrick Hodge (bass) and Eric Harland (drums)

=== Albums - In a group ===
Title	Artists	Release date	Label	Format
Plumb	David Murray, Questlove, Ray Angry	2023	J.M.I. Recordings	vinyl, digital
Revive Music Presents Supreme Sonacy Vol. 1	Igmar Thomas, Raydar Ellis, Jeff “Tain” Watts, Ben Williams, Marcus Strickland, Brandee Younger, Keyon Harrold, Maurice Brown, Justin Brown, Kris Bowers, Jaleel Shaw, Marc Cary, Casey Benjamin, and others.	2015	Blue Note Records/REVIVE Music	CD, digital

=== Singles ===
Title	Artists	Release date	Label	Format
Keep on Loving You	Wallette ft. Ray Angry	November 11, 2024	Translation Enterprises d/b/a/ United Masters	digital

== Classical works ==
- Black Athena-Power (2022). Premiered November 2022, Lexington Symphony

== Film music ==
- Descendant (documentary). 2022. [soundtrack to the original score, unreleased]

== As featured ==
- Yolanda Adams. (1996). Live in Washington.
- Sandy Rivera. (2003). In the House.
- Joss Stone. (2004). Mind Body & Soul. S-Curve.
- Mick Jagger and Dave Stewart. (2004). Alfie.
- Robbie Williams. (2006). Rudebox.
- Christina Aguilera. (2006). Back to Basics.
- Elliott Yamin. (2007). Elliott Yamin.
- Mark Ronson. (2007). Version.
- Taylor Dayne. (2008). Satisfied.
- Melinda Doolittle (2009). Coming Back to You.
- Diane Birch (2009). Bible Belt.
- Melanie Fiona. (2009). The Bridge.
- Daniel Merriweather. (2010). Love & War.
- Miguel. (2010). All I Want Is You.
- Chiara Civello. (2010). 7752.
- Jaheim. (2010). Another Round.
- The Roots. (2010). How I Got Over.
- Dionne Warwick. (2011). Only Trust Your Heart.
- Ayọ. (2011). Billie-Eve.
- The Roots. (2011). Undun.
- Nikki Jean. (2011). Pennies in a Jar.
- Esperanza Spalding. (2012). Radio Music Society.
- DJ Khaled. (2012). Kiss the Ring.
- Joss Stone. (2012). The Soul Sessions Vol. 2.
- Ja Rule. (2012). Pain Is Love 2.
- Estelle. (2012). All of Me.
- James Maddock. (2013). Another Life.
- Elvis Costello and The Roots. (2013). Wise Up Ghost & Other Songs.
- John Legend. (2013). Love in the Future.
- Jaheim. (2013). Appreciation Day.
- Dianne Reeves. (2014). Beautiful Day.
- The Roots. (2014). …And Then You Shoot Your Cousin.
- Steve Wilson. (2017). Sit Back, Relax & Unwind. J.M.I. Recordings.
- Esperanza Spalding. (2017). Exposure.
