= Lula Galvão =

Brazilian musician

Lula Galvão (born Luis Guilherme Farias Galvão in 1962) is a Brazilian guitarist and arranger. He has worked with musicians including Caetano Veloso, Guinga, Rosa Passos, Leila Pinheiro Rosa Passos, Ivan Lins and Cláudio Roditi.

== Career ==
He began his career in Brasília, Federal District with singer Rosa Passos and later worked as an arranger and performer on several of her several albums. He performed with Ivan Lins at concerts in the United States (Hollywood Bowl, Blue Note Jazz Club, San Francisco Jazz Festival, Clifford Brown Jazz Festival) and in Japan. With Guinga he performed at the Festival of the Guitar (Córdoba, Spain), with the Los Angeles Philharmonic (Disney Hall) with Vince Mendoza, John F. Kennedy Center for the Performing Arts (Washington D.C.), Spivey Hall (Georgia), HotHouse jazz club (Chicago), with Rosa Passos at the jazz festival in Berne, Switzerland, and with cellist Jaques Morelenbaum in Europe. He has also performed with Helio Alves, Paquito D'Rivera, Claudio Roditi, and Raul de Souza. He has recorded with Chico Buarque, Chano Dominguez, Frank Gambale, Leila Pinheiro, Kenny Rankin, Henri Salvador, and Wagner Tiso. In Guitar Player magazine of Brazil, he was voted one of the ten most popular guitarists in Brazil.

== Discography ==
=== As leader ===
- 2009 Bossa da Minha Terra (Biscoito Fino)
- ‘Bossa Of My Land’(Groovin' High)

- 2019 ‘Alegria de Viver ‘

(Delta Records-Jazz Line)

=== As sideman ===
https://discografia.discosdobrasil.com.br/musico/1911

With Joyce

- 1999 Hard Bossa
- 2007 Samba Jazz & Outras Bossas with Tutty Moreno
- 2009 Slow Music

With Rosa Passos

- 1996 Pano Pra Manga
- 1993 Festa
- 2003 Entre Amigos with Ron Carter (Chesky)
- 2008 Romance

With others

- 1996 Claudio, Rio & Friends, Claudio Roditi
- 1997 Here in My Heart, Kenny Rankin (Private Music)
- 1999 Suite Leopoldina, Guinga
- 2001 Macale Canta Moreira, Jards Macalé
- 2001 Rio, Uri Caine (Winter & Winter)
- 2004 A Foreign Sound, Caetano Veloso
- 2004 O Doutor Do Baiao, Humberto Teixeira
- 2006 Révérence, Henri Salvador
- 2008 Celebrating Our Time to Remember, Thiago de Mello
- 2012 Kenny Barron & the Brazilian Knights, Kenny Barron (Sunnyside)
- 2022 Quietude, Eliane Elias (Candid)
- 2024 Milton + esperanza, Milton Nascimento and Esperanza Spalding, (Concord)
