= Leo Genovese =

Argentine musician (born 1979)

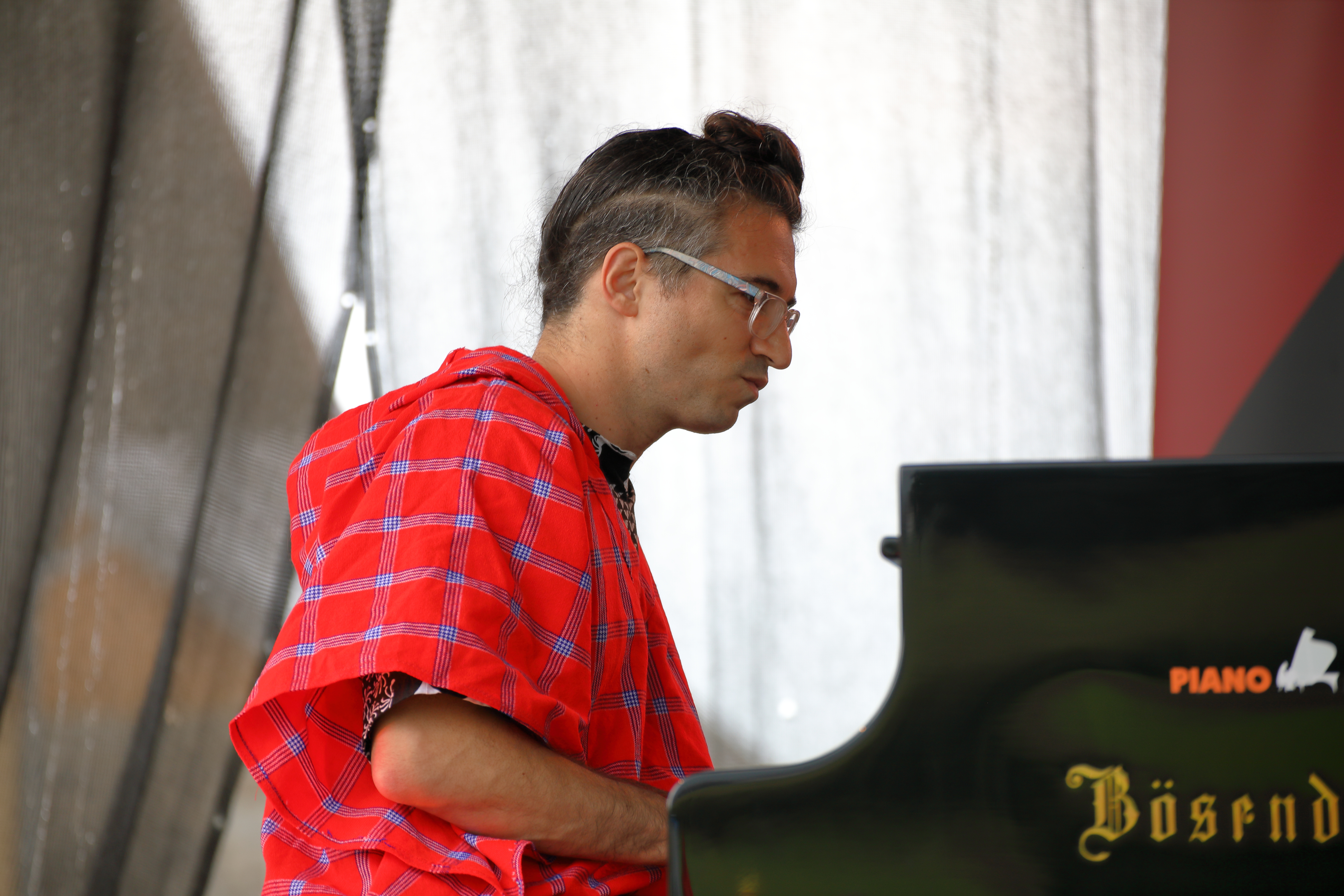
- Genovese performing in 2020
- Born: Leonardo Genovese; June 30, 1979 (age 47); Venado Tuerto, Argentina
- Occupations: Musician; composer
- Musical career
- Genres: Jazz; progressive rock; experimental rock; psychedelic rock
- Instruments: Piano; keyboards
- Years active: Mid-2000s–present
- Member of: The Mars Volta

Leonardo Genovese (born June 30, 1979) is an Argentine jazz pianist, keyboardist, and composer based in the United States. He has played and recorded with The Mars Volta.

== Life and career ==
Genovese was born in Venado Tuerto, Argentina, in 1979. He began playing the piano at the age of 5 or 6, but became more interested in playing around ten years later.

Genovese began studying music and accounting at the University of Rosario, but soon abandoned accountancy, and in 2001 he began studying at the Berklee College of Music. He graduated in 2003. His first album, Haiku II, was released the following year and was followed by Unlocked in 2008, but Genovese later talked them down, stating that they were "just a way to document where I was at the time". From 2005 he recorded and toured internationally with bassist and vocalist Esperanza Spalding.

A reviewer for The New York Times commented on Genovese's 2013 album, Seeds, that, "by refusing to privilege one historical style over another, he strengthens his claim as a polyglot". Down Beat observed that Genovese's compositions for the album "share an exploratory nature, whether the new terrain in question is a marriage of electronic and acoustic sounds, an unlikely use of chromatic scaling or the successful juxtaposition of otherwise disparate ideas."

Wayne Shorter & Leo Genovese, soloist won a Grammy Award for Best Improvised Jazz Solo for the Wayne Shorter composition "Endangered Species" for which Leo accompanied him on the album Live at the Detroit Jazz Festival. Genovese won the DownBeat Critics Award for Rising Star – Piano in 2023.

== Discography ==
An asterisk (*) indicates that the year is that of release.

=== As leader/co-leader ===
| Year recorded | Title | Label | Year released | Personnel/Notes |
|---|---|---|---|---|
| 2003 | Haikus II | Fresh Sound New Talent | 2004 | With Nathan Blehar (tenor sax), Phil Grenadier (trumpet), Demian Cabaud (bass), Francisco Mela (drums) |
| 2007? | Planet Safety | Soul Note | 2007 | Trio, with Dave Zinno (bass), Bob Gullotti (drums) |
| 2008? | Unlocked | Ropeadope | 2008 | Trio, with Justin Purtill (bass), Joe Hunt (drums); Genovese also plays wood flute |
| 2010 | Seeds | Palmetto | 2013 | With Dan Blake (saxes), John Lockwood (bass), Bob Gullotti (drums); Sergio Miranda (percussion); Esperanza Spalding (vocals), George Garzone (sax), Ricardo Vogt (guitar), Francisco Mela (drums) added on some tracks |
| 2017? | Trippeiros | Carimbo Porta-Jazz | 2017 | Trio, with Demian Cabaud (bass), Francisco Mela (drums) |
| 2017 | Live at the Detroit Jazz Festival | Candid | 2022 | Quartet, with Wayne Shorter, Terri Lyne Carrington, Esperanza Spalding |

=== As sideman ===
| Year recorded | Leader | Title | Label |
|---|---|---|---|
| 2007 | Esperanza Spalding | Esperanza | Heads Up |
| 2009 | Esperanza Spalding | Chamber Music Society | Heads Up |
| 2011 | Esperanza Spalding | Radio Music Society | Heads Up |
| 2011* | Francisco Mela and Cuban Safari | Tree of Life | Half Note |
| 2012* | Michael Feinberg | The Elvin Jones Project | Sunnyside |
| 2013* | Pancho Molina and Elias Meister | Open for Business | EMPM |
| 2014* | Sara Serpa and André Matos | Primavera | Inner Circle Music |
| 2014* | Miguel Fernandez | Afrikan Blues | Sax On |
| 2015* | George Garzone | Crescent | Jody Jazz & Jazz Hang Records |
| 2017* | Oscar Feldman | Gol | Zoho |
| 2017* | George Spanos | Reflections | Self Produced |
| 2020 | Omar Rodríguez-López | The Clouds Hill Tapes | Clouds Hill |
| 2021 | Esperanza Spalding | Songwrights Apothecary Lab | Concord |
| 2022 | The Mars Volta | The Mars Volta | Clouds Hill |
| 2022 | Jason Palmer | Con Alma | SteepleChase |
| 2023 | The Mars Volta | Que Dios Te Maldiga Mi Corazón | Clouds Hill |
| 2023 | Ohad Talmor | Back to the Land | Intakt |
| 2024 | Esperanza Spalding | Milton + esperanza | Concord |
| 2025 | The Mars Volta | Lucro Sucio; Los Ojos del Vacío | Clouds Hill |
| 2026 | The Mars Volta | Lucro Sucio; Unfinished Business | Rodriguez Lopez Productions |
