= Milton + Esperanza =

Studio album by Milton Nascimento and Esperanza Spalding
- Released: August 9, 2024
- Recorded: 2023
- Genre: Jazz
- Length: 67:30
- Languages: English; Portuguese
- Label: Concord
- Producer: Esperanza Spalding

Milton Nascimento chronology
Outros Cantos (2023)	Milton + Esperanza (2024)	Moon Over Minas (2024)

Esperanza Spalding chronology
Alive at the Village Vanguard (2023)	Milton + Esperanza (2024)

Singles from Milton + Esperanza
- 1. "Outubro" Released: May 15, 2024; 2. "Um Vento Passou (Para Paul Simon)" Released: June 21, 2024; 3. "Saudade dos Aviões da Panair (Conversando no Bar)" Released: July 17, 2024

Milton + Esperanza (stylized as Milton + esperanza) is a collaborative studio album by singer Milton Nascimento and jazz bassist and singer Esperanza Spalding. Concord Records released the album on August 9, 2024. Three tracks from the album were released as singles.

== Background ==
The album was recorded in Brazil during 2023 and includes 16 tracks: originals by Spalding as well as jazz and pop standards from Nascimento's catalogue. Spalding sings in Portuguese on most of the tracks. Nascimento, who was 81 at the time of recording, is heard on tracks "Cais", "Outubro", "Saci", "Morro Velho", and "Um Vento Passou (Para Paul Simon)". The album is dedicated to the memory of Wayne Shorter, who died in March 2023, aged 89. Nascimento and Spalding's first collaboration was on Spalding's 2010 album Chamber Music Society, with Nascimento singing on the track "Apple Blossom". Nascimento was introduced to Spalding's work by Herbie Hancock.

The list of guest stars includes musicians such as Paul Simon, Dianne Reeves, Lianne La Havas, Maria Gadu, Guinga, Tim Bernades, and Carolina Shorter, Wayne Shorter's widow. Singer-songwriter Paul Simon studied Portuguese for two weeks so as to sing the duet that Nascimento wrote for him.

Tracks "Outubro", "Um Vento Passou (Para Paul Simon)" and "Saudade dos Aviões da Panair (Conversando no Bar)" were released as singles.

== Reception ==
Professional ratings
Aggregate scores
Source	Rating
AnyDecentMusic?	8.0/10
Metacritic	84/100
Review scores
Source	Rating
AllMusic	4.5/5 stars
All About Jazz	4/5 stars
The Arts Desk	3/5 stars
Financial Times	4/5 stars
The Guardian	5/5 stars
The Irish Times	4.5/5 stars
Mojo	4/5 stars
The Observer	3/5 stars
The Record Collector	3/5 stars
Uncut	4.5/5 stars

Milton + Esperanza received critical acclaim from music critics. On Metacritic, which assigns a normalized score out of 100 to ratings from mainstream publications, the album received a weighted mean score of 84 based on 5 reviews, indicating "universal acclaim".

Matt Collar of AllMusic wrote, "At the center of all this are Nascimento and Spalding, whose smiling interplay helps make Milton + Esperanza feel like both a capstone to a monumental career and continuation of a musical legacy."

Jack Nicas of The New York Times stated, "There is little surprise that, at 81, Nascimento’s voice is not what it once was. It is quieter, unsteadier and at times straining to reach notes it once soared past. Yet it retains an undeniable warmth. It is weathered, broken in. And it provides a comforting presence throughout the album, like a grandparent’s hand in yours."

Ernesto Lechner of Rolling Stone added, "The result of their collaboration is Milton + Esperanza, an episodic, strikingly impressionistic album that combines reworked Nascimento classics with new Spalding originals, warm audio vignettes, and a couple of intriguing covers."

It was included in the list of 50 best albums of 2024 by the São Paulo Art Critics Association.

== Track listing ==
No.	Title	Writer(s)	Length
1.	"The Music Was There"	Justin Tyson	0:57
2.	"Cais"	Nascimento, Ronaldo Bastos	3:40
3.	"Late September"	Spalding	1:26
4.	"Outubro"	Nascimento	5:17
5.	"A Day in the Life"	Lennon–McCartney	4:36
6.	"Interlude for Saci"	Corey D. King	1:41
7.	"Saci" (featuring Guinga)	Guinga, Paulo César Pinheiro	3:28
8.	"Wings for the Thought Bird" (featuring Elena Pinderhughes and Orquestra Ouro Preto)	Spalding	3:06
9.	"The Way You Are"	Spalding	0:48
10.	"Earth Song" (featuring Dianne Reeves)	Michael Jackson	6:42
11.	"Morro Velho" (featuring Orquestra Ouro Preto)	Nascimento	5:15
12.	"Saudade dos Aviões da Panair (Conversando no Bar)" (featuring Lianne La Havas, Maria Gadú, Tim Bernardes, and Lula Galvão)	Nascimento, Fernando Brant	5:24
13.	"Um Vento Passou (Para Paul Simon)" (featuring Paul Simon)	Nascimento, Márcio Borges	4:36
14.	"Get It by Now"	Spalding	2:24
15.	"Outro Planeta"	Tyson	2:06
16.	"When You Dream" (featuring Carolina Shorter)	Wayne Shorter, Edgy Lee	9:26
Total length:			67:30

== Charts ==
Chart (2024)	Peak position
US Top Jazz Albums (Billboard)	15

== Personnel ==
- Milton Nascimento – vocals
- Esperanza Spalding – bass, vocals, producing, liner notes
- Matthew Stevens – guitar
- Justin Tyson – drums
- Eric Doob – drums
- Leo Genovese – piano
- Corey D. King – vocals, synths
- Kainã Do Jêje – percussion
- Ronaldinho Silva – percussion
- Lula Galvão – guitar
- Guinga – guitar
