= Emily's D+Evolution =

Studio album by Esperanza Spalding
- Released: 4 March 2016
- Studio: NRG Studios, North Hollywood, California; Magic Shop, New York City; HUMAN, New York City
- Genre: Jazz; jazz fusion; funk; art rock
- Length: 45:44
- Label: Concord
- Producer: Esperanza Spalding; Tony Visconti

Esperanza Spalding chronology
Radio Music Society (2012)	Emily's D+Evolution (2016)	Exposure (2017)

Emily's D+Evolution is the fifth studio album by American musician Esperanza Spalding, released on 4 March 2016 by Concord Records.

== Background ==
The album was co-produced by Spalding and longtime David Bowie collaborator Tony Visconti. On the album, Spalding sings through the alter ego of Emily, which is her middle name. In an interview, Spalding stated that Emily "is a spirit, or a being, or an aspect who I met, or became aware of. I recognize that my job...is to be her arms and ears and voice and body".

== Critical reception ==
Professional ratings
Aggregate scores
Source	Rating
AnyDecentMusic?	7.9/10
Metacritic	84/100
Review scores
Source	Rating
All About Jazz	4.5/5 stars
AllMusic	4.5/5 stars
Exclaim!	7/10
The Guardian	4/5 stars
Now	4/5 Ns
Pitchfork	8.6/10
PopMatters	9/10
Rolling Stone	4/5 stars
Stereophile	4.5/5 stars
Tom Hull	B

Emily's D+Evolution received widespread critical acclaim from contemporary music critics. At Metacritic, which assigns a normalized rating out of 100 to reviews from mainstream critics, the album received an average score of 84, based on 14 reviews, which indicates "universal acclaim".

Marcus J. Moore of Pitchfork Media praised the album, stating, "The lyrics are elusive at first, darting behind fast-moving songs and delivered in impressionistic, conversational bursts that recall the delivery of Joni Mitchell. But the fearless generosity behind them communicates itself loud and clear, and it's a spirit that animates the entire album. With it, Spalding has once again redefined an already singular career, dictating a vision entirely on her own terms". Michael J. Warren of Exclaim! commented, "Emily's D+Evolution is a tough album to get a full grasp on. It's not a neat alter ego side project; rather than going the Chris Gaines route, Esperanza Spalding is again flexing her range, showing that her playing style and voice can find a home in any genre. There are moments here where she falls into a nice pocket that the listener might wish she'd remain in for a little while longer." Christopher R. Weingarten of Rolling Stone added, "...Emily’s D+Evolution is a far more ambitious and thornier affair. The lyrics, flowing in disjunctive clusters, are about deleted narratives, glass ceilings and dreams deferred – ultimately a complex, funky prog-rock concept opera about love and identity.

== Track listing ==
All tracks are written by Esperanza Spalding, except where noted.

No.	Title	Writer(s)	Length
1.	"Good Lava"		3:38
2.	"Unconditional Love"		3:46
3.	"Judas"		4:10
4.	"Earth to Heaven"		3:52
5.	"One"		3:15
6.	"Rest in Pleasure"		4:59
7.	"Ebony and Ivy"		4:20
8.	"Noble Nobles"	Esperanza Spalding; Corey King	3:33
9.	"Farewell Dolly"		2:07
10.	"Elevate or Operate"		4:03
11.	"Funk the Fear"		5:07
12.	"I Want It Now"	Anthony Newley; Leslie Bricusse	2:51
Total length:			45:44

Deluxe Edition
No.	Title	Length
13.	"Change Us"	3:57
14.	"Unconditional Love (Alternate Version)"	9:40

== Personnel ==
Credits adapted from the liner notes of Emily's D+Evolution.

Main personnel

- Esperanza Spalding – vocals, bass (tracks 1–11, 13, 14), piano (10, 12), bass synthesizer (12)
- Matthew Stevens – guitar
- Karriem Riggins – drums (2–5, 7, 8, 10, 13), percussion (9)
- Justin Tyson – drums (1, 6, 11, 12, 14)
- Corey King – backing vocals (1, 2, 5–7, 12–14), synthesizer (6), trombone (8), keyboards (12)
- Emily Elbert – backing vocals (1, 6, 11, 12, 14)
- Nadia Washington – backing vocals (2, 5, 7, 13)
- Celeste Butler, Fred Martin, Katriz Trinidad, Kimberly L. Cook-Ratliff – backing vocals (11)

Additional personnel

- Esperanza Spalding – production
- Tony Visconti – production (2–5, 7–10, 13), mixing (2–5, 7, 9, 10)
- Kyle Hoffman – engineering
- Tim Price – engineering
- Erin Tonkon, Kyle McAulay, Martin Cooke, Nicolas Fournier – assistant engineering
- Rich Costey – mixing (1, 6, 8, 11, 12, 13)
- Mario Borgatta – assistant mixing
- Paul Blakemore – mastering
- Lawrence Azerrad – graphics, design
- Holly Andres – photography

== Charts ==
Chart (2016)	Peak position
Belgian Albums (Ultratop Flanders)	148
Dutch Albums (Album Top 100)	175
French Albums (SNEP)	181
US Billboard 200	88
US Top Jazz Albums (Billboard)	1
