= Guinga =

Brazilian guitarist and composer (born 1950)

Guinga (Carlos Althier de Souza Lemos Escobar; born June 10, 1950) is a Brazilian guitarist and composer born in Madureira, a working-class suburb of Rio de Janeiro. As a child, he was nicknamed "Gringo", because of his pale skin, and the artistic name "Guinga" comes from the way he pronounced the word.

== Biography ==
His uncle taught him to play the guitar when he was eleven years old. Guinga began composing music at the age of 14. In 1967, when he was 17, his song "Sou Só Solidão" reached the first eliminatory round in Rede Globo's second Festival Internacional da Canção. At the age of 26, he began his five-year classical guitar studies with Jodacil Damasceno.

During the 1970s, Guinga accompanied famous singers such as Beth Carvalho and João Nogueira and recorded with samba legends Cartola and Clara Nunes. He also began a fertile songwriting partnership with the poet and lyricist Paulo Cesar Pinheiro. Their songs were recorded by important artists like Elis Regina, Nelson Gonçalves, Miúcha, Clara Nunes, and Michel Legrand.

During the same time, Guinga embarked on a parallel career in dentistry, which he practiced for nearly thirty years. His music career took off in earnest in 1990, when Ivan Lins and Vitor Martins formed the Velas label in order to release Guinga's first album, with a repertoire of songs he co-authored with lyricist Aldir Blanc.

Guinga is known for his songwriting and his skill on the guitar. He is known for drawing on many musical genres, including choro, samba, baião, frevo, modinha, waltz, foxtrot, blues, classical music, and jazz. His compositions are often harmonically and rhythmically complex, while being melodic.

== Discography ==
Albums

- Simples e Absurdo (1991) Velas
- Delírio Carioca (1993) Velas
- Cheio de Dedos (1996) Velas
- Suíte Leopoldina (1999) Velas
- Cine Baronesa (2001) Velas
- A Música Brasileira deste Século por seus Autores e Intérpretes: Guinga (2002) Sesc
- Noturno Copacabana (2003) Velas
- Graffiando Vento - Guinga & Gabriele Mirabassi (2004) Egea
- Dialetto Carioca (2007) Egea
- Casa de Villa (2007) Biscoito Fino
- Saudade do Cordão - Guinga & Paulo Sérgio Santos (2009) Biscoito Fino
- Rasgando Seda - Guinga & Quinteto Villa-Lobos (2012) Sesc
- Francis e Guinga - Guinga & Francis Hime (2013) Biscoito Fino
- Roendopinho (2014) Acoustic Music Records
- Porto da Madama - Guinga & Maria João, Esperanza Spalding, Maria Pia De Vito and Monica Salmaso (2015) Selo Sesc
- Mar Afora - Guinga & Maria João (2015) Acoustic Music
- Dobrando a Carioca - Guinga & Zé Renato, Jards Macalé, Moacyr Luz (2016) Biscoito Fino
- Canção da Impermanência (2017) Acoustic Music Records
- Intimidade - Guinga & Stefania Tallini (piano) (2017) Alpha Music (2 songs by Guinga)
- Avenida Atlântica - Guinga & Quarteto Carlos Gomes (2017) Selo Sesc
- Guinga Invites Gabriel Mirabassi—Passos e Assovio - Guinga & Gabriel Mirabassi (2018) Acoustic Music
- Japan Tour 2019 - Guinga & Mônica Salmaso, Teco Cardoso & Neilor Proveta (2021) Biscoito Fino
- Zaboio (2021) Tratore
- Você, Você - Anna Paes Canta Guinga - Guinga & Anna Paes (2022) Kuarup
- Milton + esperanza - Milton Nascimento and Esperanza Spalding (2024) Concord

Contributing artist

- Bolero de Satá (Nina Ripe & Guinga) - Nina Ripe: Apaixonada (2011) (Nina Ripe Music)
- The Rough Guide to the Music of Brazil (1998) (World Music Network)

Radio program

- Especial Guinga 70 anos - RÁDIO CÂMARA, October 31, 2020
