= Park City Jazz Festival =

Music festival in Utah, United States

Park City Jazz Festival is a jazz festival held at the Deer Valley Resort in Park City, Utah. By 2006, the event had expanded to a three-day festival featuring nationally and internationally known jazz musicians and Grammy Award-winning performers. In addition to musical performances, the festival featured two performance stages, a festival village for local artisans and vendors, and food and beverage concessions.

Performers at the festival have included Chris Botti, Kirk Whalum, Gerald Albright, Robben Ford, Esperanza Spalding and Papa Grows Funk.

== Reception ==
The festival attracted nationally recognized jazz musicians and was noted for its outdoor setting at Deer Valley Resort. Despite periods of adverse weather during the 2006 festival, local coverage described attendance and performances as successful.
