= Rosa Passos =

Brazilian singer and guitarist

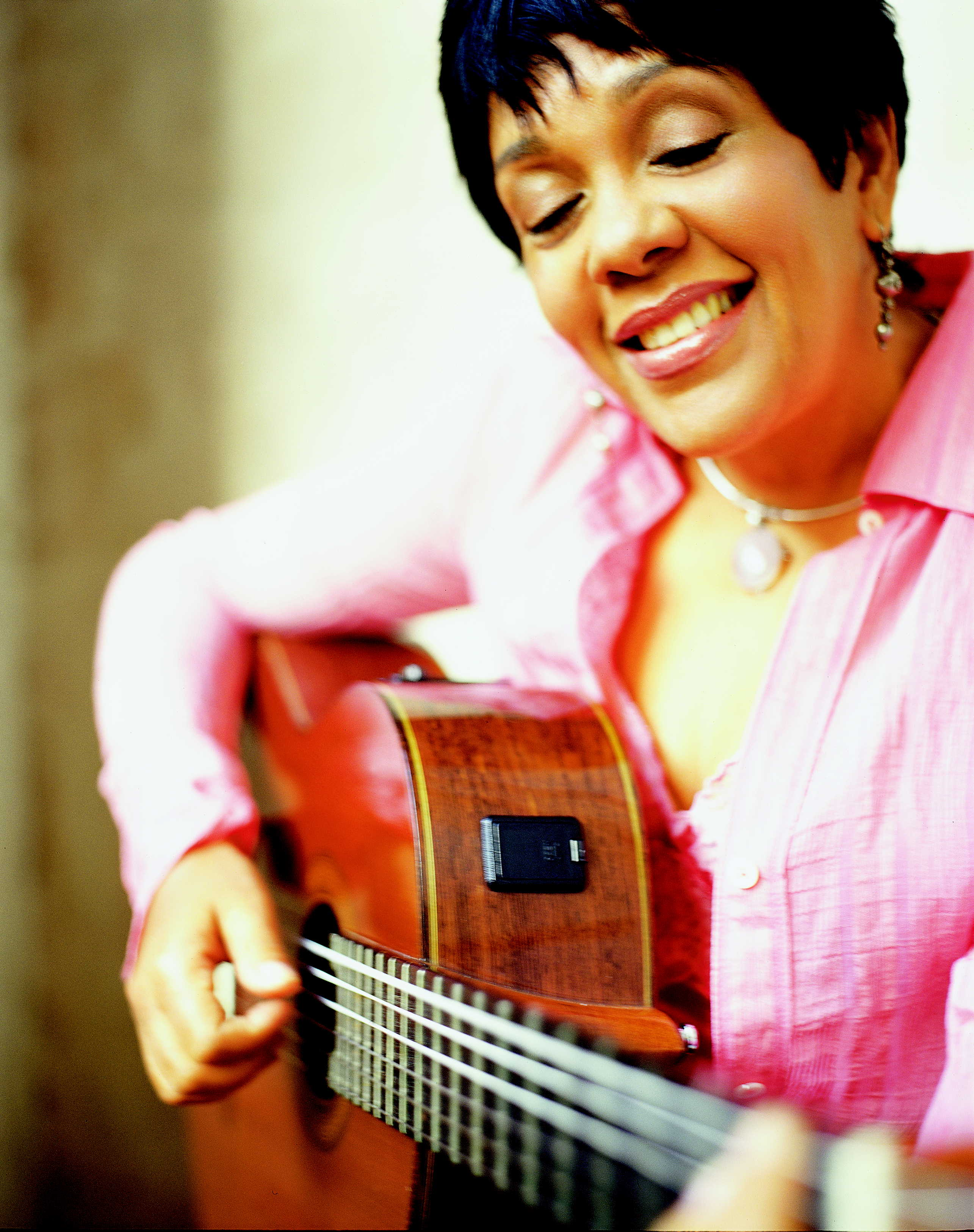

Background information
- Born: April 13, 1952; Salvador, Bahia, Brazil
- Genres: Latin, Brazilian jazz, Música popular brasileira, Jazz
- Occupations: Singer, musician
- Instrument: Guitar
- Years active: 1978–present
- Website: www.rosapassos.com.br

Rosa Passos (Brazilian Portuguese: [ˈʁozɐ ˈpasus]; born April 13, 1952) is a Brazilian singer and guitarist.

Passos began playing piano at age thirteen, but after listening to Dorival Caymmi and João Gilberto she abandoned the instrument to become a singer. In the late 1960s, she began appearing on television and at music festivals. In 1972 she submitted the song "Mutilados" under a pseudonym to the Globo Network's Festival Universitario and won first prize. She recorded her debut album in 1978, working with poet Fernando de Oliveira. A follow-up effort, Amorosa, followed nine years later, in 1988. In the 1990s she recorded several albums of songs by her major influences. She toured Europe in 1999 with Paquito D'Rivera and on her own in Europe and Japan in 2000. In 2004, Amorosa was re-released, and attracted notice in the United States, reaching No. 7 on the Billboard World Music album chart. In 2008, Passos was awarded an Honorary Doctorate of Music from Berklee College of Music.

== Discography ==
- Recriação (1979)
- Amorosa (1988)
- Curare (1991)
- Festa (1993)
- Pano Pra Manga (1996)
- Letra & Música – Ary Barroso (1997) (with Lula Galvao)
- O melhor de Rosa Passos (1997) (best-of compilation)
- Especial Tom Jobim (1998)
- Rosa Passos Canta Antonio Carlos Jobim – 40 Anos de Bossa Nova (1998)
- Morada do Samba (1999)
- Rosa Passos Canta Caymmi (2000)
- Me and My Heart (2001)
- Eu e Meu Coração (2003)
- Azul (2002)
- Entre Amigos (Chesky, 2003) (with Ron Carter)
- Amorosa (2004)
- Rosa Por Rosa (2005)
- Rosa (2006)
- Romance (2008)
- É Luxo Só (2011)
- Samba dobrado (2013)
- Rosa Passos canta Ary, Tom e Caymmi (2015)
- Amanhã Vai Ser Verão (2018)

As guest

- The Rough Guide to the Music of Brazil (1998) (World Music Network)
