= Radio Music Society =

Studio album by Esperanza Spalding
- Released: March 20, 2012
- Studio: Avatar Studios, Raydar Studios and MSR Studios (New York City, New York); Atlantic Sound Studios (Brooklyn, New York); Water Music Recorders (Hoboken, New Jersey); Kung Fu Bakery (Portland, Oregon); Rodby Studio (Chicago, Illinois); Zobiz (Porter Ranch, California)
- Genre: Contemporary jazz; big band; R&B; neo soul
- Length: 57:54
- Label: Heads Up International
- Producer: Esperanza Spalding; Q-Tip

Esperanza Spalding chronology
| Chamber Music Society (2010) | Radio Music Society (2012) | Emily's D+Evolution (2016) |

Singles from Radio Music Society
- 1. "Black Gold" Released: February 1, 2012; 2. "Radio Song" Released: March 26, 2012

Radio Music Society is the fourth studio album by Esperanza Spalding, which was released through the record label Heads Up International on March 20, 2012. The album earned Spalding Grammy Awards for Best Jazz Vocal Album and Best Instrumental Arrangement Accompanying Vocalist(s) for the track, "City of Roses".

== Critical reception ==
Professional ratings
Aggregate scores
| Source | Rating |
|---|---|
| AnyDecentMusic? | 6.2/10 |
| Metacritic | 74/100 |
Review scores
| Source | Rating |
| All About Jazz | 4/5 stars |
| AllMusic | 3.5/5 stars |
| The Austin Chronicle | 3/5 stars |
| Blurt Magazine | 7/10 stars |
| Entertainment Weekly | B |
| The Guardian | 4/5 stars |
| Rolling Stone | 2.5/5 stars |
| Slant | 3/5 stars |
| The Telegraph | 3/5 stars |
| The Times | 4/5 stars |

Radio Music Society was well received by music critics. At Metacritic, which assigns a normalized rating out of 100 to reviews from mainstream critics, the album received an average score of 74, based on 15 reviews, which indicates "generally favorable reviews". John Bungey of The Times noted the album's "journey through soul, gospel, balladry and big-band swing", and complimented Spalding's "light, airy voice". He wrote in conclusion: "For those who have hitherto found her considerable abilities easier to admire than enjoy, this is the most convincing display yet". A review in the monthly Kulturspiegel extra of the German Spiegel magazine noted that the poppy arrangements of the songs might help the album to become successful beyond the jazz genre. Jeff Artist of Okayplayer wrote "With her new companion LP, Radio Music Society, the young virtuoso branches out sonically, injecting her jazz roots with some modern soul and pop juice, maybe even inspiring the Bieber faithful to check in on what all the fuss is about... At just 11 tracks, this record flexes serious range, but what’s even more impressive is that it rarely sounds overextended".

== Commercial performance ==
In the United States, Radio Music Society became Spalding's first Top 10 album. It debuted at number 10 on the Billboard 200 chart and number one on the Top Jazz Albums chart with first week sales of 25,000 copies. The album has sold 135,000 copies in the US as of January 2016.

== Track listing ==
All tracks are written by Esperanza Spalding except where noted.

Radio Music Society track listing
| No. | Title | Writer(s) | Length |
|---|---|---|---|
| 1. | "Radio Song" | | 6:32 |
| 2. | "Cinnamon Tree" | | 5:36 |
| 3. | "Crowned & Kissed" | Spalding; Algebra Blessett | 4:35 |
| 4. | "Land of the Free" | | 1:54 |
| 5. | "Black Gold" (featuring Algebra Blessett & Lionel Loueke) | | 5:17 |
| 6. | "I Can't Help It" (featuring Joe Lovano) | Susaye Brown Greene; Stevie Wonder | 4:42 |
| 7. | "Hold On Me" | | 3:40 |
| 8. | "Vague Suspicions" | | 5:51 |
| 9. | "Endangered Species" (featuring Lalah Hathaway) | Spalding; Wayne Shorter; Joseph Vitarelli | 6:38 |
| 10. | "Let Her" | | 4:21 |
| 11. | "City of Roses" | | 4:35 |
| 12. | "Smile Like That" | | 4:18 |
| Total length: | | | 57:52 |

Japanese only bonus track
| No. | Title | Writer(s) | Length |
|---|---|---|---|
| 13. | "Jazz Ain't Nothin but Soul" (featuring Joe Lovano) | Norman Mapp | 3:37 |

== Personnel ==
=== Production ===
- Q-Tip – executive producer, co-producer (3, 11)
- Dave Love – associate executive producer
- Esperanza Spalding – producer
- Terri Lyne Carrington – additional production, post production
- Dan Hallas – local production
- Zulema Mejias – local production
- Joe Ferla – engineer, mixing (1, 2, 4–12)
- Erik Zobler – mixing (3)
- Chris Cardillo – additional recording, assistant engineer
- Raydar Ellis – additional recording
- James Frazee – additional recording, assistant engineer
- Sean Kelly – additional recording, assistant engineer
- Fernando Loderio – additional recording, assistant engineer
- Tim Marchiafava – additional recording, assistant engineer
- Brian Montgomery – additional recording
- Bob Stark – additional recording
- Blair Wells – additional recording, additional editing (1)
- Derik Lee – assistant mix engineer
- Brett Meyer – additional mix assistant
- Steve Rodby – mix preparation
- Jeremy Loucas – post production
- Paul Blakemore – mastering at CMG Mastering (Cleveland, Ohio)
- Jeff De Blois – artwork
- Roland Nicol – artwork, design
- Sandrine Lee – photography, additional photography
- John Abbott – additional photography
- David Bartolomi – additional photography
- Damian Conrad – additional photography
- Bailey Davidson – additional photography
- Christopher Drukker – additional photography
- Jesus Chuda Hidalgo – additional photography
- Jimmy Katz – additional photography
- Bransy Kayzakisn Rowe – additional photography
- Chanel Kennebrew – additional photography
- Matthew Murphy – additional photography
- Dion Ogust – additional photography
- Ben Wolf – additional photography
- Cassie O'Sullivan – stylist, make-up
- Daniel Florestano – management

=== Musicians ===
- Esperanza Spalding – vocals, electric bass (1–3, 5, 6, 9, 10, 12), arrangements (1–3, 5, 6, 8, 10–12), acoustic bass (7, 8, 11, 12), additional arrangements (9)
- Leo Genovese – acoustic piano (1–3, 9), Rhodes electric piano (1, 6, 8, 10–12), keyboards (2, 3), guembri (8, 9)
- James Weidman – organ (4)
- Raymond Angry – organ (5)
- Janice Scroggins – acoustic piano (7)
- Jef Lee Johnson – guitar (2, 9)
- Lionel Loueke – guitar (5), voice (5)
- Ricardo Vogt – guitar (6, 8, 10)
- Gilad Hekselman – guitar (12)
- Terri Lyne Carrington – drums (1–3, 5, 9, 11)
- Lyndon Rochelle – drums (6)
- Billy Hart – drums (7)
- Jack DeJohnette – drums (8, 10, 12)
- Jamey Haddad – percussion (1)
- Q-Tip – glockenspiel (11), vocals (11)
- Daniel Blake – sax solo (1), tenor saxophone (2, 3), soprano saxophone (8, 9), flute (8), alto saxophone (9), baritone saxophone (9), saxophones (10)
- Tivon Penicott – tenor saxophone (5)
- Joe Lovano – tenor saxophone (6, 13)
- Anthony Diamond – sax solo (11)
- Jeff Galindo – trombone (1, 3, 8, 10, 12)
- Corey King – trombone (5)
- Darren Barrett – trumpet (1–3, 9, 10, 12)
- Igmar Thomas – trumpet (5)
- Jody Redhage – cello (2)
- Olivia Deprado – violin (2)
- Wayne Shorter – arrangements (9)
- Gil Goldstein – additional arrangements (9)
- Gretchen Parlato – backing vocals (1, 6), spoken word (10)
- Justin Brown – backing vocals (1, 6)
- Alan Hampton – backing vocals (1)
- Becca Stevens – backing vocals (1, 6)
- Chris Turner – backing vocals (1)
- Algebra Blessett – vocals (5)
- Savannah Children's Choir – choral voices (5)
- Lalah Hathaway – vocals (9)
- Raydar Ellis – spoken word (10), sounds (10)
- Leni Stern – backing vocals (10)

American Music Program big band (Tracks 1, 7 & 11)

- Thara Memory – horn arrangements, conductor (1, 11)
- Dan Brewster – arrangement assistant (1, 7)
- Brian Ward – arrangement assistant (11)
- Kama Bell – clarinet
- Kama Bell, Renato Caranto, John Carey, Stanley Matabane, Andrew Olsen, Sam Seacrist and Kyle Zimmerman – alto saxophone
- Jeff Rathbone – baritone saxophone
- Hayden Conrad, Nicole Glover, Stanley Matabane, Aaron Reihs and Adam Reihs – tenor saxophone
- Jerry Stalnaker – bass trombone
- Stan Bock, Dan Brewster, Ian Garner, Javier Nero, Ashton Summers and Matt Warming – trombone
- Kiran Bosely, Noah Conrad, Noah Hocker, Benjamin C. McDonald, Tree Palmedo and Benjamin Seacrist – trumpet

== Charts ==
Chart performance for Radio Music Society
| Chart (2012) | Peak position |
|---|---|
| Dutch Albums (Album Top 100) | 59 |
| French Albums (SNEP) | 54 |
| Japanese Albums Chart | 39 |
| Norwegian Albums (VG-lista) | 33 |
| Spanish Albums (Promusicae) | 40 |
| Swedish Jazz Albums | 4 |
| Swiss Albums (Schweizer Hitparade) | 75 |
| US Billboard 200 | 10 |
| US Top Jazz Albums (Billboard) | 1 |
| US Indie Store Album Sales (Billboard) | 4 |

=== Singles ===
Chart performance for singles from Radio Music Society
| Year | Title | Chart | Peak position |
|---|---|---|---|
| 2012 | "Black Gold" | US Top Jazz Songs | 20 |
| 2012 | "Black Gold" | Japan Hot 100 | 21 |
| 2012 | "I Can't Help It" | US Top Jazz Songs | 26 |
