= Esperanza (Esperanza Spalding album) =

Studio album by Esperanza Spalding
- Released: May 20, 2008
- Recorded: 2007
- Studios: Wellspring Sound (Acton, Massachusetts); Big Time Audio (Jonesborough, Tennessee)
- Genres: Jazz; Latin
- Length: 67:36
- Languages: English; Portuguese; Spanish
- Label: Heads Up
- Producers: Esperanza Spalding; Niño Josele; Martin Walters

Esperanza Spalding chronology
| Junjo (2006) | Esperanza (2008) | Chamber Music Society (2010) |

Esperanza is the second studio album by American bassist and singer Esperanza Spalding.

== Description ==
It was released on May 20, 2008, by Heads Up International. Having been exposed to many cultures while growing up, Spalding sings in three languages on the album: English, Spanish and Portuguese. After Spalding's Grammy Award for Best New Artist in February 2011, the album entered the Billboard 200 at 138.

== Critical reception ==
Professional ratings
Review scores
| Source | Rating |
|---|---|
| All About Jazz | 3/5 stars |
| Allmusic | 4/5 stars |
| Tom Hull | B+ |

Thom Jurek of AllMusic stated, "On this recording she seeks to widen her musical adventure at every turn, but she does it with such with taste, refinement, and a playful sense of humor that virtually anyone who encounters this offering will find not only much to delight in, but plenty to be amazed by as well." Myles Tanzer in his book Music Is My Life: Soundtrack Your Mood With 80 Artists for Every Occasion commented, "...on that album she sings in three languages, sings her heart out, and plays masterfully." Nate Chinen of Vibe added, "Like the basketball that shares her name, Spalding bounces around. But this album doesn’t make a slapdash show of eclecticism. Spalding has fashioned something cohesive and diverse, calling upon a strong coalition of musicians and the depth of her own skills. It’s clear Esperanza’s definitely got game—and has no hung-ups about showing it." Jeff Winbush of All About Jazz added that the album "flat-out smokes, and showcases the Berklee-trained bassist as potentially one of the more promising young talents in jazz."

== Track listing ==
All tracks are written by Esperanza Spalding except where noted.

| No. | Title | Writer(s) | Length |
|---|---|---|---|
| 1. | "Ponta de Areia" | Milton Nascimento, Fernando Brant | 5:39 |
| 2. | "I Know You Know" | | 3:46 |
| 3. | "Fall In" | | 3:57 |
| 4. | "I Adore You" | | 7:27 |
| 5. | "Cuerpo y Alma (Body & Soul)" | Edward Heyman, Robert Sour | 8:01 |
| 6. | "She Got to You" | | 4:29 |
| 7. | "Precious" | | 4:24 |
| 8. | "Mela" | | 6:57 |
| 9. | "Love in Time" | | 5:47 |
| 10. | "Espera" | | 4:40 |
| 11. | "If That's True" | | 7:33 |
| 12. | "Samba em Preludio" | Vinícius de Moraes, Baden Powell | 5:11 |
| Total length: | | | 67:36 |

== Personnel ==
- Esperanza Spalding – vocals (1–10, 12), acoustic bass (1, 4–11), Doolin bass (2, 12), arrangements
- Leo Genovese – acoustic piano (1–11), Wurlitzer electric piano (6), Rhodes electric piano (10)
- Niño Josele – guitar (12)
- Otis Brown – drums (1, 2, 4, 5, 7, 9–11), backing vocals (4, 7)
- Horacio Hernandez – drums (4, 6, 8)
- Jamey Haddad – various percussions (1, 2, 4, 6), various cymbals (1, 2)
- Donald Harrison – alto saxophone (6, 11)
- Ambrose Akinmusire – trumpet (8, 11)
- Gretchen Parlato – backing vocals (1, 4)
- Theresa Perez – backing vocals (4)
- Victor Gould – co-arrangements (5)

=== Production ===
- Dave Love – executive producer
- Esperanza Spalding – producer
- Niño Josele – producer (12)
- Daniel Florestano – associate producer
- Martin Walters – co-producer, recording, mixing
- Eric Kilburn – assistant engineer
- Pablo Martin Caminero – guitar recording (12)
- Robert Friedrich – mastering at Telarc International Corporation (Cleveland, Ohio)
- Arantza Benito Melgar – production supervisor
- Natalie Singer – production supervisor
- Theresa Perez – local production, cover typography
- Robert Hoffman – art direction, design
- Johann Sauty – photography
- Raquel Gonzalez – stylist
- Megan McGeorge – wardrobe
- Carmen Romero – wardrobe

== Chart performance ==
Esperanza spent over 70 weeks on the Billboard Top Jazz Albums Chart.

| Chart (2009–10) | Peak position |
|---|---|
| Norwegian Albums (VG-lista) | 12 |
| Swedish Albums (Sverigetopplistan) | 37 |
| US Billboard 200 | 138 |
| US Independent Albums (Billboard) | 40 |
| US Top Catalog Albums (Billboard) | 16 |
| US Heatseekers Albums (Billboard) | 12 |
| US Top Jazz Albums (Billboard) | 3 |
