= Exposure (Esperanza Spalding album) =

Studio album by Esperanza Spalding
- Released: December 16, 2017
- Recorded: September 12–15, 2017
- Studio: NRG Recording Studios
- Genre: Jazz
- Length: 80:27
- Label: Concord
- Producer: Esperanza Spalding, Ray Angry, Matthew Stevens, Justin Tyson, Rob Schwimmer

Esperanza Spalding chronology
Emily's D+Evolution (2016)	Exposure (2017)	12 Little Spells (2018)

Exposure is the sixth studio album by bassist and singer Esperanza Spalding. It was released on December 16, 2017, by Concord Records. It is a limited edition album, with only 7,777 copies being available.

== Background ==
I thought: I just need a break from framing. I'm tired of backing everything up and explaining why this character does this and that.

—Spalding on her reasons for recording Exposure in a New York Times interview

With an aim to finish ten songs for this project, Spalding started broadcasting the writing, arranging, and recording of Exposure at 9am PST on September 12, 2017, via Facebook Live for 77 hours straight. The live stream took place at NRG Recording Studios and included breaks for sleep and sustenance, adding a layer of reality-TV voyeurism to the experiment. Spalding chose to do the experiment in 77 hours because she was once told by a reverend that "seven is a divine number. It’s the number of completion. It represents the earthly culmination of a divine thought", and she enjoyed that sentiment. She has stated that the premise of Exposure is that all the facets of creators only need the right environment to coalesce into completeness.

It’s called “Exposure”. “Exposure”. September 12th at 9am I’m going to the studio for three days with nothing prepared. It’s gonna be live-streamed on Facebook Live and for three days, during three days, we’re going to create, compose, write, record, produce, and finish an album in front of a live audience: you. Like I said, less time for us as creators forces us to just move forward and give you what’s in here. We can’t stop to judge, wonder, question “is it good enough? Is it right? Oh let me redo that.” Nah, nah, nah, it’s like life. We are performing for you. It’s real time and I presume you’ll have comments and thoughts and feedback and we’ll incorporate those too. So, it’s an exchange. I wanna take away all the layers we usually hide behind as creators and just get right to the conversation of creating directly for you. So when the three days is up and the recording button goes off and the cameras go off, that’s it. I’m not gonna touch it. I’m just gonna mix it and send it to you. So what it is I’m gonna send to you is a CD or an LP, but there’s only 7,777 copies because it was a moment in time! So if you get one, you get one. If you don’t, you don’t. So you can pre-order it now and that’s "Exposure".

— Spalding, announcing Exposure on her YouTube channel.

Exposure exists as a limited edition of 7,777 physical copies, all individually signed and numbered, as well as an original piece of notepaper Esperanza will have used to write the lyrics and music, allowing those who witnessed the process to own a piece of the creation itself, directly from the source. A second disc, labeled as "Undeveloped", was included with the album and consists of ten additional, bonus tracks of works made prior to the development of the Exposure.

All 7,777 physical albums were announced and available for pre-order on July 26, 2017, and were completely sold out on the final day of Spalding's live stream on September 15, 2017.

== Critical reception ==
Professional ratings
Review scores
Source	Rating
Jazzwise	3/5 stars
Pitchfork	7.7/10

In his review for Pitchfork, Seth Colter Walls commented, "As tempting as it may be to think that disciplined artists like Spalding can just turn on a genius tap and let the product flow, Exposure reveals some measure of what is required when an established artist hopes to improve and innovate." Kevin Le Gendre of Jazzwise noted, "Written, performed, recorded and mixed in 77 hours while live streamed on Facebook, the music stands up as a coherent piece of work, in which Spalding's melodic strength is consistent and the no-frills production actually a far cry from the somewhat overly dense predecessor Emily's D + Evolution. Put simply, Spalding has pulled out the stops with regard to her composing, straddling the line between jazz, soul and pop, while keeping the group identity strong. It is on the downtempo material that the assembled players gel most convincingly..."

== Track listing ==
All tracks are written by Esperanza Spalding except where noted.

Disc 1: Exposure
No.	Title	Writer(s)	Length
1.	"Swimming Toward the Black Dot"		4:52
2.	"Public Trance It"		4:33
3.	"Heaven in Pennies" (featuring Robert Glasper)	Robert Glasper, Spalding	6:18
4.	"Colonial Fire"		3:57
5.	"Coming to Life" (featuring Lalah Hathaway)	Lalah Hathaway, Spalding	4:10
6.	"Geriment"		2:20
7.	"I Am Telling You"		4:37
8.	"The Ways You Got the Love" (featuring Andrew Bird)	Andrew Bird, Spalding	5:19
9.	"I Do"		2:44
10.	"Double Jointed Canyon"	Justin Tyson, Matthew Stevens, Spalding	4:11
Total length:			43:05

Disc 2: Undeveloped (Pre-Exposure Practice)
No.	Title	Length
11.	"Helluva"	3:15
12.	"Tangerine"	3:55
13.	"Word Jungle"	4:00
14.	"Chelsea Mercy"	4:32
15.	"Work of Art"	2:10
16.	"Winning Machines"	5:37
17.	"Trouble"	3:47
18.	"4th Grade"	5:16
19.	"Whisper"	2:05
20.	"Fittest"	2:45
Total length:		80:27

== Personnel ==
Credits adapted from the liner notes of Exposure.

Main personnel

- Esperanza Spalding – vocals, acoustic bass, electric bass, kalimba
- Ray Angry – keyboards (not on Undeveloped tracks)
- Matthew Stevens – guitar
- Justin Tyson – drums
- Robert Glasper – piano (track 3)
- Lalah Hathaway – vocals (track 5)
- Andrew Bird – vocals, violin (track 8)
- Rob Schwimmer – continuum (Undeveloped tracks)
- Tavonna Miller – backing vocals (Undeveloped tracks)[was misspelled in the credits]
- Starr Busby – backing vocals (Undeveloped tracks)

Additional personnel

- Fernando Lodeiro – recording (tracks 1–11, 14–20), mixing
- Zach Brown (at Sullivan Street Studio) – recording (tracks 12 and 13)
- Rich Costey – mixing
- Paul Blakemore (at CMG Mastering, Cleveland, OH) – mastering
