= Holly Andres =

American photographer

- Born: 1977; Missoula, Montana, US
- Known for: Photography
- Website: www.hollyandres.com

Holly Andres (born 1977) is an American photographer and writer based in Portland, Oregon. Andres's work focuses on flamboyant, movie-like scenes which draw inspiration from her experiences as a child. Andres has said that she views her photo subjects as protagonists within a larger narrative. Usually, Andres's photographs take one of two moods: either "dark and mysterious or bright and witty."

== Education ==
Andres was originally trained as a painter. She earned her Bachelors in Fine Arts from The University of Montana in Painting and Drawing and her Masters in Fine Arts from Portland State University in Cinema Studies.

== Career ==
=== Fine art ===
Andres's first solo exhibition Sparrow Lane premiered in Portland, Oregon in 2008, then toured to San Francisco, New York City and Istanbul. The digital C-prints depict four young women and explore the female transition into adolescence, with allusions to Nancy Drew and Lewis Carroll's Alice's Adventures in Wonderland.

Her second body of work, The Fall of Spring premiered at Portland's Hartman Fine Art Gallery in April 2012. The constructed photographs unfold one event, a peaceful day at the park disrupted, from multiple perspectives. The large format, vibrant images create a heightened sense of drama in which loss of innocence and protective roles of mothers are explored.

The Fallen Fawn, a series of photographs, was inspired by a story about Andres's older sisters, who discovered an abandoned suitcase behind their childhood home one day. Andres reveals how they "took it home, hid it under their bed, and when they could, often during the night, secretly dressed up in this "mystery woman's" belongings. They dressed up in her clothes, wrapped their hair in her curlers and wore her lipstick." The title of the piece itself refers to the name Andres dubbed the mystery woman.

Wings is a series of photographs and a short film written, directed, and starring Andres's 13 year old niece Violet Bye. Violet set the film and story in the 70's saying "I wanted to put the film in a less accepting time, I always wondered what it would’ve been like for me to grow up in that time and those surroundings." The story was shared in an exhibit at Fairbanks Hall OSU, organized by Andres. The exhibit showcased photos from the project as well as objects from the recording organized in a cinematic and meaningful way.

Andres's work has been shown at Robert Mann Gallery (New York City), Robert Koch Gallery (San Francisco), Jackson Fine Art (Georgia), and Charles A. Harman Fine Art (Portland).

Her work has appeared in The New York Times Magazine, Time, The New Yorker, and Saks Fifth Avenue. She won the 2016 Photo District News (PDN) Photo Annual in Advertising Award and an AI-IP American Photograph Award.

=== Commercial/editorial work ===
Andres also works commercially as a photographer, working with many clients such as Refinery29, Vanity Fair Italy, Complex Magazine, Oregon Institute for Creative Research. and more.

In an interview with Peta Pixel, Andres reveals that her favorite editorial pieces give her the time to research, think, and craft images over the span of multiple days.
