= 12 Little Spells =

Studio album by Esperanza Spalding
- Released: October 19, 2018
- Recorded: 2018
- Studios: Atomic Sound, NYC
- Genre: Jazz
- Length: 55:41
- Label: Concord
- Producers: Esperanza Spalding; Matthew Stevens; Justin Tyson

Esperanza Spalding chronology
Exposure (2017)	12 Little Spells (2018)	Songwrights Apothecary Lab (2021)

12 Little Spells is the seventh studio album by American bassist and singer Esperanza Spalding. It was released on October 19, 2018, by Concord Records. Each song was released individually from October 7–18, 2018 and each track also contains a music video.

12 Little Spells debuted at number 31 on the US Billboard Top Album Sales and number 1 on the Jazz Albums chart. At the 62nd Annual Grammy Awards in 2020, the album won the Grammy Award for Best Jazz Vocal Album.

== Background ==
The album is a decidedly significant departure from her previous work, utilising an experimental framing device in which each song correlates to a single body part. With this, Spalding stated she hoped to distance herself from the identity of a "musician" and associate herself with an unbound experimentalism that cannot be categorised.

== Critical reception ==
Professional ratings
Review scores
Source	Rating
AllMusic	4/5 stars
DownBeat	3.5/5 stars
Jazz Forum	5/5 stars
Jazz Journal	4/5 stars
Jazzwise	4/5 stars
Mojo	4/5 stars
Paste	7.1/10
Rolling Stone	4/5 stars
The Times	4/5 stars
Tom Hull	B−

Lucas Phillips of Boston Globe commented "Weird is too often a cover for mediocrity or an epithet meant to describe what is foreign to us. Sure, Esperanza Spalding's new music and video project, "12 Little Spells," is weird. Weird like seeing the inside of the singer-bassist's eyeballs and an animation that for all the world resembles a uterus dancing to the beat. The music and lyrics lean in similar directions. But that isn't a cover for mediocrity, nor does it represent anything so unfamiliar".

Libby Cudmore of Paste added "Musically, there is nothing constrained about her performance as a vocalist or a bassist. It's extremely organic, as though each song is unfolding right before you, rather than after laboring in a recording studio... This is not dinner jazz, but no one who picks up an Esperanza Spalding album expects it to be. Her voice and her bass are a listener's guide on a tour with no map and no destination, but where wonders abound". Writing in Echoes, Adam Mattera singled out specific tracks for merit: "Touch In Mine" renders everything Solange has been retreading over her last couple of albums somewhat redundant, while in some alternate universe you could even imagine the Chic-in-outer-space groove of "You Have To Dance" being a hit". John Pareles and Jon Caramanica of The New York Times listed the album as the fourth best album of the year in the publication's 28 best albums of 2018 list, stating that in spite of "devious melodies, odd meters and cleverly interlocking patterns", Spalding achieves complex insight with "such breezy charm that the songs come across as lighthearted, [and] even lightheaded".

== Track listing ==
All tracks are written by Esperanza Spalding.

12 Little Spells
No.	Title	Corresponding Body Parts	Length
1.	"12 Little Spells"	Thoracic Spine	4:53
2.	"To Tide Us Over"	Mouth	4:53
3.	"Until the Next"	Eyes	4:17
4.	"Thang"	Hips	4:35
5.	"Touch in Mine"	Fingers	4:53
6.	"The Longing Deep Down"	Abdominal Portal	4:35
7.	"You Have to Dance"	Feet	3:27
8.	"Now Know"	Solar Portal	4:26
9.	"All Limbs Are"	Arms	3:36
10.	"Readying to Rise"	Legs	5:07
11.	"Dancing the Animal"	Mind	5:07
12.	"With Others"	Ears	5:52
Total length:			55:41

2019 iTunes Deluxe Edition
No.	Title	Corresponding Body Parts	Length
1.	"12 Little Spells"	Thoracic Spine	0:29
2.	"To Tide Us Over"	Mouth	4:53
3.	"'Til the Next"	Eyes	4:17
4.	"Thang"	Hips	4:35
5.	"Touch in Mine"	Fingers	4:53
6.	"The Longing Deep Down"	Abdominal Portal	4:35
7.	"You Have to Dance"	Feet	3:27
8.	"Now Know"	Solar Portal	4:26
9.	"All Limbs Are"	Arms	3:36
10.	"Readying to Rise"	Legs	5:07
11.	"Dancing the Animal"	Mind	5:07
12.	"With Others"	Ears	5:52
13.	"Lest We Forget"	Blood	5:16
14.	"How To"	Hair	3:54
15.	"Move Many"	Joints	2:55
16.	"Ways Together"	Shoulders	3:45
Total length:			71:31

== Charts ==
Chart (2018)	Peak position
US Top Album Sales (Billboard)	31
US Top Jazz Albums (Billboard)	1

== Personnel ==
- Esperanza Spalding – vocals, acoustic bass, electric bass
- Matt Stevens – guitar, electric bass
- Justin Tyson – drums, organ, synths, vocals, beats & programming
- Aaron Burnett – saxophone
- Burniss Travis – electric bass, acoustic bass, vocals
- Corey King – vocals
- Rob Schwimmer – continuum
- Orchestra ("12 Little Spells")
- Eric Reed – French horn
- Laura Weiner – French horn
- Brandon Ridenour – trumpet
- John Blevins – trumpet
- Richard Harris – tenor/bass trombone
- Julietta Curenton – flute, piccolo
- Katie Hyun – violin
- Sami Merdinian – violin
- Fernando Lodeiro – recording and mixing engineer
