= Songwrights Apothecary Lab =

Studio album by Esperanza Spalding
- Released: September 24, 2021
- Recorded: 2021
- Genre: Jazz
- Length: 60:47
- Label: Concord
- Producers: Esperanza Spalding; Corey King; Phoelix; Raphael Saadiq

Esperanza Spalding chronology
12 Little Spells (2018)	Songwrights Apothecary Lab (2021)	Live at the Detroit Jazz Festival (2022)

Singles from Songwrights Apothecary Lab
- 1. "Formwela 4" Released: June 11, 2021; 2. "Formwela 5" Released: June 18, 2021; 3. "Formwela 6" Released: June 25, 2021; 4. "Formwela 10" Released: August 26, 2021

Songwrights Apothecary Lab is the eighth studio album by American bassist and singer Esperanza Spalding. Concord Records released the album on September 24, 2021.

The album debuted at number 11 on the US Billboard Contemporary Jazz Albums chart. At the 64th Annual Grammy Awards, the album won Best Jazz Vocal Album award.

== Background ==
Songwrights Apothecary Lab is named after her affiliation of musicians and health practitioners. The release contains 12 pieces of music, called formwelas, written and recorded over several months in Spalding's traveling music laboratory in collaboration with various musicians, researchers, and practitioners. The album is presented as "half songwriting workshop, half guided research practice" that "brings musicians and practitioners of different disciplines, such as music therapy, neuroscience, Black American music, Sufism, and South Indian Carnatic music, together in the spirit of radical healing." Songwriting took place in New York City, Portland, and other places. Formwela 12 is skipped intentionally.

Spalding said, "It’s like the oldest thing ever….we’re playing with the origin of music. The origin of music being: a response to others in your community, in your surroundings. And the response is intuitive! When you hum for a baby or when you’re sitting with somebody who is grieving and you, you feel compelled to hum, or when you’re excited and go, “Wow!” That’s music!"

== Critical reception ==
Professional ratings
Review scores
Source	Rating
AllMusic	4/5 stars
DownBeat	4/5 stars
Le Devoir	3.5/5 stars
Pitchfork	7.5/10
Record Collector	3/5 stars
Tom Hull	B

Martin Johnson of JazzTimes stated, "It’s not hard to imagine in these times of pandemic, global climate crisis, and a capricious level of economic stratification that an artist would want to put healing music into the world, and consistent with Spalding’s previous efforts, Songwrights Apothecary Lab is forward and didactic. She consulted with neuroscientists and music therapists in creating the 12 songs here, each of which is designed to address specific emotions and stresses." Sheldon Pearce of The New Yorker commented, "When it comes to the music’s intended applications, the listener’s mileage may vary, but there is something enriching happening in these sessions. This is the opposite of improvisation—this music is carefully formulated, plotted with purpose—yet it retains much of the charm and the fearlessness of Spalding’s previous work. The compositions make efficient use of her relaxed voice, itself an instrument of healing capable of quieting the mind and unclenching the body." Tarisai Ngangura of Pitchfork called the album "a strangely romantic, sometimes didactic effort to mold the often private experience of listening and feeling the healing power of music."

== Track listing ==
No.	Title	Writer(s)	Length
1.	"Formwela 1"	Spalding	3:35
2.	"Formwela 2" (featuring Ganavya Doraiswamy)	Spalding	6:10
3.	"Formwela 3"	Spalding	7:05
4.	"Formwela 4"	Corey King, Spalding	4:19
5.	"Formwela 5" (featuring Corey King)	Corey King, Spalding	3:32
6.	"Formwela 6" (featuring Corey King)	Corey King, Spalding	3:10
7.	"Formwela 7"	Spalding	3:26
8.	"Formwela 8"	Leo Genovese, Spalding	11:39
9.	"Formwela 9"	Leo Genovese, Spalding	4:31
10.	"Formwela 10"	Spalding	3:28
11.	"Formwela 11"	Leo Genovese, Matthew Stevens	3:08
12.	"Formwela 13"	Spalding	6:44
Total length:			60:47

== Personnel ==
- Esperanza Spalding – bass, piano, vocals, producing
- Aaron Burnett – saxophone
- Ganavya Doraiswamy – vocals
- Leo Genovese – piano
- James Greeley – eagle-bone whistle
- Lamont Hamilton – bell
- Corey King – vocals, producing
- Francisco Mela – drums
- Phoelix – piano, synthesizer, vocals, xylophone, producing
- Chris Sholar – guitar
- Wayne Shorter – saxophone
- Matthew Stevens – guitar
- Thrive Choir – vocals
- Steve Turre – conch shell
- Justin Tyson – drums, percussion, vocals

== Charts ==
Chart (2021)	Peak position
US Top Contemporary Jazz Albums (Billboard)	11
