= Junjo =

Studio album by Esperanza Spalding
- Released: 2006, April 18
- Recorded: 2005, April 6–7
- Studio: PBS Studios (Westwood, MA)
- Genre: Jazz
- Length: 49:02
- Label: Ayva Musica
- Producer: Esperanza Spalding

Esperanza Spalding chronology
Junjo (2006)	Esperanza (2008)

Junjo is the debut studio album by American bassist and singer Esperanza Spalding. It was released on 18 April 2006 by Spanish label, Ayva Music.

== Background ==
The piano trio features pianist Aruán Ortiz, Francisco Mela on drums and then 22-year-old Spalding on upright bass, and providing vocals –often wordless– on all but two tracks. Besides compositions by Jimmy Rowles, Egberto Gismonti and Chick Corea the trio plays originals. The album draws on jazz as well as on a number of Brazilian and other Latin music styles.

== Critical reception ==
Professional ratings
Review scores
Source	Rating
All About Jazz	4.5/5 stars
Allmusic	3.5/5 stars
Tom Hull	B+

Michael G. Nastos from AllMusic calls Junjo "an exercise in joy and freedom", noting "the certainty of her concept and clarity of her vision ... an auspicious beginning." Jim Santella of All About Jazz commented, "Esperanza Spalding's debut drives jazz's modern mainstream with a hip-sounding classic piano trio. Her emotional, wordless vocals and conversational bass playing offer a delightful celebration of music as folk art. Spalding's bass playing gets noticed while she interprets traditional jazz favorites as well as fresh new originals." Jamie Katz of Vibe wrote, "...it's Spalding singular creations that make Junjo truly beguiling, signaling a new and important voice in jazz."

== Track listing ==
No.	Title	Writer(s)	Length
1.	"The Peacocks"	Jimmy Rowles	7:56
2.	"Loro"	Egberto Gismonti	5:06
3.	"Humpty Dumpty"	Chick Corea	5:51
4.	"Mompouana"	Aruán Ortiz	7:51
5.	"Perazuán"	Spalding, Ortiz	3:38
6.	"Junjo"	Spalding	5:13
7.	"Cantora de Yala"	Gustavo Leguizamón, Manuel J. Castilla	4:55
8.	"Two Bad"	Spalding	6:59
9.	"Perazela"	Francisco Mela, Spalding	1:32
Total length:			49:02

== Personnel ==
- Esperanza Spalding – vocals double bass
- Aruán Ortiz – grand piano
- Francisco Mela – drums

=== Production ===
- Pablo Valero – executive producer
- Esperanza Spalding – producer, liner notes
- Peter Kontrimas – recording, mixing, mastering
- Ellen Sitkin – design, booklet photography
- Youri Lenquette – cover photography
