= Live at the Detroit Jazz Festival =

Live album by Wayne Shorter, Terri Lyne Carrington, Leo Genovese, Esperanza Spalding
- Released: September 9, 2022
- Recorded: September 3, 2017
- Venue: Detroit International Jazz Festival
- Genre: Jazz, Latin jazz, Cuban jazz, Bossa Nova
- Length: 55:34
- Label: Candid
- Producer: Terri Lyne Carrington

Wayne Shorter chronology
Emanon (2018)	Live at the Detroit Jazz Festival (2022)

Terri Lyne Carrington chronology
New Standards Vol. 1 (2022)	Live at the Detroit Jazz Festival (2022)	We Insist 2025 (2025)

Leo Genovese chronology
Trippeiros (2017)	Live at the Detroit Jazz Festival (2022)

Esperanza Spalding chronology
Songwrights Apothecary Lab (2021)	Live at the Detroit Jazz Festival (2022)	Alive at the Village Vanguard (2023)

Live at the Detroit Jazz Festival is a collaborative live album by Wayne Shorter, Terri Lyne Carrington, Esperanza Spalding, and Leo Genovese. Candid released the album on September 9, 2022. It is also the final recording for Shorter prior to his death in 2023.

== Background ==
The album was recorded live at Carhartt Amphitheater Stage at the 2017 Detroit International Jazz Festival on September 3, 2017. The performance was one of Shorter’s last ones before his retirement and was dedicated to the memory of jazz pianist and composer Geri Allen. The album was nominated for the Best Jazz Instrumental Album at the 65th Annual Grammy Awards, where Shorter and Genovese won the Best Improvised Jazz Solo category for their work on the track "Endangered Species".

The record contains five tracks. Three of them are written by Wayne Shorter, one by Milton Nascimento, and one by Geri Allen, whose death prevented her from performing in Detroit. The double vinyl LP version of the album has a bonus track.

Shorter commented on his experiences at the concert: "With the mixture of people — male and female, varying ethnicities and backgrounds — sometimes we did things that sound larger than the four of us, with more of an orchestral approach. If there are things going on in the recording that can be heard by people to the extent that it can turn some thoughts around about life and culture… people who hear it may recognize that we are all different — and the same."

== Reception ==
Professional ratings
Review scores
Source	Rating
AllMusic	4/5 stars
Jazzwise	3/5 stars

Larry Applebaum of JazzTimes stated, "A remarkably adventurous performance, it’s finally being released as a double-LP vinyl set with a fascinating bonus track." Thom Jurek of AllMusic wrote, "Live at the Detroit Jazz Festival is a compelling exercise in kinetic, deeply emotional music making (mostly) in the moment . Given Shorter's retirement from performing (he is 89 with health issues) this amounts to a gift as well as a historical document." Stuart Nicholson of Jazzwise commented, "The quartet feel their way into the music and – to use a term Esperanza Spalding uses in the liner notes – they are ‘building the plane while flying it’." Steve Futterman of The New Yorker commented, "Shorter exhibits his instantly unmistakable sonic identity throughout a performance marked by intensity and uncommon musical empathy. It’s not every octogenarian whose work can offer inspiration and direction to today’s upcoming players, but Shorter is nothing if not a glorious anomaly."

== Track listing ==
No.	Title	Writer(s)	Length
1.	"Someplace Called "Where""	Richard Cummings Jr., Dianne Reeves, Wayne Shorter	14:19
2.	"Endangered Species"	Wayne Shorter, Esperanza Spalding, Joseph Vitarelli	21:42
3.	"Encontros e Despedidas"	Fernando Brant, Milton Nascimento	8:37
4.	"Drummers Song"	Geri Allen	4:41
5.	"Midnight in Carlotta's Hair"	Wayne Shorter	6:15
Total length:			55:34

== Personnel ==
Band

- Wayne Shorter – sax (soprano & tenor)
- Terri Lyne Carrington – drums
- Leo Genovese – keyboards, piano
- Esperanza Spalding – bass, vocals

Production

- Terri Lyne Carrington – producer
- Dean Albak – editing engineer
- Rob Griffin – mixing engineer
- Harold Larue – mastering engineer
- Ed Hatfield – engineer
- Tony Phillips – engineer
- Timothy Powell – engineer
- Chris Collins – artistic director
- Chris Woodrich – photography
- Marek Lazarski – band photo
- Yesim Tosuner – graphic design
