= Chamber Music Society =

Studio album by Esperanza Spalding
- Released: August 17, 2010
- Recorded: October 8–10, 2009 / January 14–19, 2010
- Studios: Bennett Studios (Englewood, New Jersey); Capitol Studios (Hollywood, California)
- Genres: Jazz, chamber music, third stream
- Length: 56:15
- Label: Heads Up
- Producers: Esperanza Spalding; Gil Goldstein

Esperanza Spalding chronology
Esperanza (2008)	Chamber Music Society (2010)	Radio Music Society (2012)

Chamber Music Society is the third studio album by American bassist and singer Esperanza Spalding. It was released on August 17, 2010 by Heads Up International. After Spalding's Grammy win for Best New Artist, the album re-entered the Billboard 200 at number 34 with sales of 18,000.

== Background ==
A video was made for the song "Little Fly". The song is a poem by William Blake set to music by Spalding.

A vinyl version of the album was released in February 2011. This version of the album included a bonus track titled "Morning" which was to be included on her Radio Music Society album.

Chamber Music Society was the best-selling contemporary jazz album of 2011.

== Critical reception ==
Professional ratings
Review scores
Source	Rating
The Absolute Sound	4/5 stars
AllMusic	5/5 stars
All About Jazz	5/5 stars
Billboard	73/100
The Daily Telegraph	2/5 stars
The Guardian	3/5 stars
Paste	7.1/10
Popmatters	8/10 stars
Rolling Stone	3/5 stars
Tom Hull	B−

Bill Friskics-Warren of The Washington Post noted "The mood throughout the album's 11 tracks is languid and improvisatory, with Spalding and members of her chamber ensemble weaving in and out of roomy arrangements that afford them as much chance to linger on a note as to take off on flights of melodic or rhythmic fancy. Their fusion of jazz, contemporary classical and other sources, including some understated funk, is as lively as it is original". Will Layman of PopMatters commented, "2010 brings Spalding’s most ambitious and complex music yet. Chamber Music Society delivers more of what a fan would expect –sinuous singing, a flexible, modern, acoustic jazz trio at the center, Latin rhythms that shift through funk, swing, and Brazilian grooves, but always in service of tuneful soul — while adding some daring new elements as well."

Zachary Sniderman of Paste Magazine wrote "Spalding’s voice is the warm heart of Chamber Music Society. Her best songs are anchored by that core, despite some experimental slips into the jazz deep-end. Spalding does better carving out a soundscape than acting like a sonic bulldozer. Still, Chamber Music Society is a fresh, slender album that shows both Spalding’s immense talent and the heart within it". Mark Kemp of Rolling Stone added, "Chamber Music Society finds Spalding stretching herself a bit too thin... But her talent is undeniable."

== Track listing ==
All songs written and composed by Esperanza Spalding, except where noted.

1. "Little Fly" (lyrics: William Blake, music: Esperanza Spalding) – 3:33
2. "Knowledge of Good and Evil" – 7:59
3. "Really Very Small" – 2:44
4. "Chacarera" (Leo Genovese) – 7:27
5. "Wild Is the Wind" (Dimitri Tiomkin, Ned Washington) – 5:37
6. "Apple Blossom" – 6:02
7. "As a Sprout" – 0:41
8. "What a Friend" – 4:54
9. "Winter Sun" – 6:48
10. "Inútil Paisagem" (lyrics: Aloísio de Oliveira, music: Antonio Carlos Jobim) – 4:38
11. "Short and Sweet" – 5:52

Japanese only bonus track
No.	Title	Writer(s)	Length
12.	"Midnight Sun"	lyrics: Johnny Mercer, music: Lionel Hampton and Sonny Burke

== Personnel ==
- Esperanza Spalding – voice, acoustic bass, string arrangements (1–4, 8, 11), arrangements (5, 6, 9), vocal arrangements (10)
- Leo Genovese – acoustic piano, Rhodes electric piano, melodica
- Ricardo Vogt – nylon guitar (6)
- Terri Lyne Carrington – drums
- Quintino Cinalli – percussion, candombe drums, bombo leguero
- David Eggar – cello, cello soloist (4, 5)
- Lois Martin – viola
- Entcho Todorov – violin
- Gil Goldstein – string arrangements (1–4, 8, 11)
- Gretchen Parlato – voice (2, 10), vocal arrangements (10)
- Milton Nascimento – voice (6)

=== Production ===
- Esperanza Spalding – producer
- Gil Goldstein – producer
- Dae Bennett – engineer
- Jay Newland – engineer
- Charlie Paakkari – engineer
- Al Perrotta – assistant engineer
- Paul Smith – assistant engineer
- Travis Stefel – assistant engineer
- Joe Ferla – mixing at Area 51 (Brooklyn, New York)
- Drea Young – mix assistant
- Steve Rodby – mix preparation at Rodby Studios (Chicago, Illinois)
- Paul Blakemore – mastering at Heads Up International (Cleveland, Ohio)
- Roland Nicol – package design
- Sandrine Lee – photography
- Jennifer Armstrong – photography assistant
- The Music Guild – photography (musical instruments)
- Cassie O'Sullivan – stylist, make-up, wardrobe

== Charts ==
Chart (2010)	Peak position
Dutch Albums (Album Top 100)	50
French Albums (SNEP)	92
Norwegian Albums (VG-lista)	13
UK Jazz & Blues Albums (Official Charts)	14
US Billboard 200	34
US Heatseekers Albums (Billboard)	1
US Top Jazz Albums (Billboard)	1
US Indie Store Album Sales (Billboard)	16
