= Esperanza Spalding =

American jazz bassist and singer

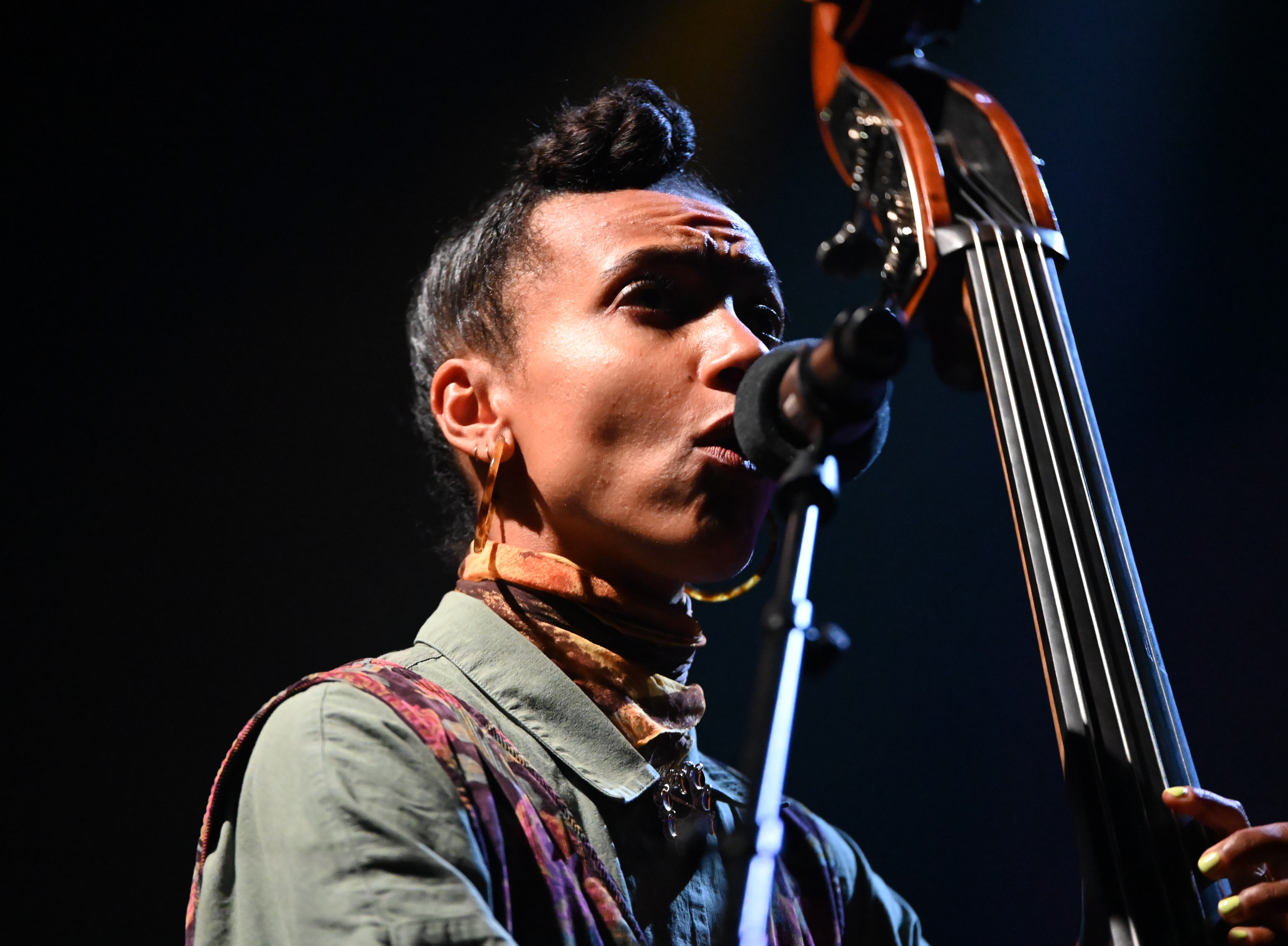
- Spalding performing in 2026

Background information
- Born: Esperanza Emily Spalding; October 18, 1984 (age 42); Portland, Oregon, U.S.
- Genres: Jazz; jazz fusion; bossa nova; Latin jazz; neo soul; R&B; third stream
- Occupations: Musician; composer; educator; bandleader
- Instruments: Double bass; bass guitar; vocals
- Years active: 2000–present
- Labels: Ayva Musica; Heads Up; Concord
- Website: www.esperanzaspalding.com

Esperanza Emily Spalding (born October 18, 1984) is an American bassist, singer, songwriter, and composer. Her accolades include five Grammy Awards, a Boston Music Award, a Soul Train Music Award, and two honorary doctorates: one from her alma mater Berklee College of Music and one from the California Institute of the Arts (CalArts).

Born and raised in Portland, Oregon, Spalding began playing music professionally in her childhood, performing as a violinist in the Chamber Music Society of Oregon at age five. She was later both self-taught and trained on other instruments, including guitar and bass. Her proficiency earned her academic scholarships to Portland State University and Berklee College of Music, both of which she attended, studying music.

Spalding released her first album, Junjo, in 2006 on the Spanish label Ayva Musica, after which she signed with the independent American label Heads Up, who released her 2008 self-titled album. Her third studio album, Chamber Music Society (2010), was a commercial success, charting at number 34 on the Billboard 200, and resulting in Spalding winning her first Grammy Award for Best New Artist. She saw further acclaim for her fourth release, Radio Music Society (2012), which earned the Grammy for Best Jazz Vocal Album, as well as the track "City of Roses" winning for Best Arrangement, Instrument and Vocals.

After spending the following several years performing as a supporting band player, Spalding released her fifth studio album, a funk rock-inspired concept album titled Emily's D+Evolution, co-produced by Tony Visconti, on Concord Records. The following year, she released the album Exposure, which was limited to 7,777 copies. Her subsequent sixth studio record, 12 Little Spells, was released in 2019, and peaked at number one on Billboard's Top Jazz Albums. The album also saw Spalding nominated for two Grammy Awards, winning in the Best Jazz Vocal Album category.

In addition to writing and performing music, Spalding has also worked as an instructor, first at the Berklee College of Music, beginning at age 20. In 2017, Spalding was appointed professor of the practice of music at Harvard University, a position from which she resigned in 2022.

== Life and career ==
=== 1984–2003: Early life and education ===
Esperanza Emily Spalding was born October 18, 1984, in Portland, Oregon, to an African American father and a mother of Welsh, Native American, and Hispanic descent. She was raised in the King neighborhood of northeast Portland, a neighborhood at that time known for gang violence. Her mother raised Spalding and her brother as a single parent. During her childhood, Spalding had juvenile idiopathic arthritis, and as a result spent much of her elementary school years being home-schooled, though she also attended King Elementary School in northeast Portland. During this period, Spalding found the opportunity to pick up instruction in music by listening to her mother's college professor, who instructed her mother in jazz guitar. Spalding said that she sometimes accompanied her mother to classes, sat listening under the piano, then at home repeated what the teacher had played. Spalding remained in the King neighborhood of Portland until age ten, when she relocated with her family to the suburbs of Portland.

Spalding's mother took note of her daughter's musical proclivity when Spalding was able to reproduce Beethoven by ear on the family's piano at a young age. Spalding herself credited watching classical cellist Yo-Yo Ma perform on an episode of Mister Rogers' Neighborhood as an integral part of her childhood, and it inspired her to pursue music. By the time Spalding was five, she had taught herself to play the violin and began performing professionally with the Chamber Music Society of Oregon. She remained with the group until she was 15 years old, and left as concertmaster. Though she has been described as a musical prodigy, Spalding has denounced this title, commenting in 2010: "I am surrounded by prodigies everywhere I go, but because they are a little older than me, or not a female, or not on a major label, they are not acknowledged as such."

Spalding also played oboe and clarinet in her youth before discovering the double bass while attending The Northwest Academy, a performing arts high school to which she had won a scholarship. She began performing live in clubs in Portland as a teenager, securing her first gig in a blues club at the age of 15, when she could play only one line on bass. One of the seasoned musicians with whom she played invited her to join the band's rehearsals, which led to regular performances spanning almost a year. According to Spalding, this served as a chance for her to learn and sharpen her abilities as a musician. When she was 15 or 16 years old, Spalding joined the local indie rock/pop group Noise for Pretend as a singer and lyricist. Although she had taken a few private voice lessons, which taught her how to project her voice, she said that her primary singing experience at the time had come from singing in the shower. Her desire to perform live evolved naturally out of the compositional process, when she would sing and play simultaneously to see how melody and voice fit together, but she acknowledges that performing both roles together can be challenging.

Spalding dropped out of The Northwest Academy at the age of 16, and after completing her GED, enrolled on a music scholarship in the music program at Portland State University, where she remembers being "the youngest bass player in the program." Although she lacked the training of her fellow students, she feels that her teachers nevertheless recognized her talent. She decided to apply to Berklee College of Music on the encouragement of her bass teacher, and did well enough in her audition to receive a full scholarship. In spite of the scholarship, Spalding found meeting living expenses a challenge, so her friends arranged a benefit concert that paid her airfare. Spalding's savings did not last long and she considered leaving music to study political science, a move jazz guitarist and composer Pat Metheny discouraged. He told her that she had "the 'X Factor'" and could make it if she applied herself. In 2002, she played bass on M. Ward's album Transfiguration of Vincent (Merge Records).

=== 2004–2007: Career beginnings, teaching, and Junjo ===
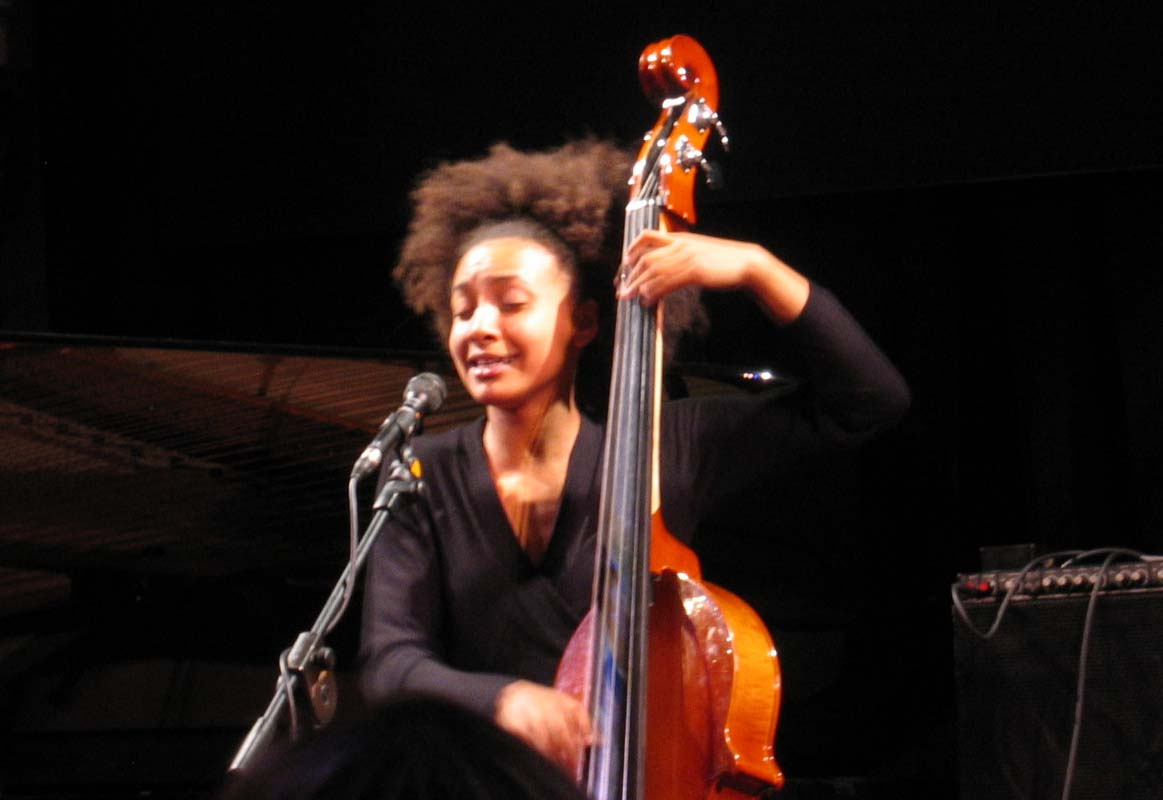
Spalding at the Umbria Jazz Festival in Perugia, Italy, 2007

Gary Burton, Executive Vice President at Berklee, said in 2004 that Spalding had "a great time feel, she can confidently read the most complicated compositions, and she communicates her upbeat personality in everything she plays."

Ben Ratliff wrote in The New York Times in 2006 that Spalding's voice is "light and high, up in Blossom Dearie's pitch range, and [that] she can sing quietly, almost in a daydream" and that Spalding "invents her own feminine space, a different sound from top to bottom." Spalding was the 2005 recipient of the Boston Jazz Society scholarship for outstanding musicianship. Almost immediately after graduation from college later the same year, Spalding was hired by Berklee College of Music to teach bass performance and private lessons, becoming one of the youngest instructors in the institution's history, at the age of 20. As a teacher, Spalding tries to help her students focus their practice through a practice journal, which can help them recognize their strengths and what they need to pursue.

Her debut album, Junjo, was released in April 2006 by Ayva Music. It was created to display the dynamic that she felt among her trio. Though Junjo was released solely under her name, Spalding considers it a group effort.

=== 2008–2010: Esperanza ===
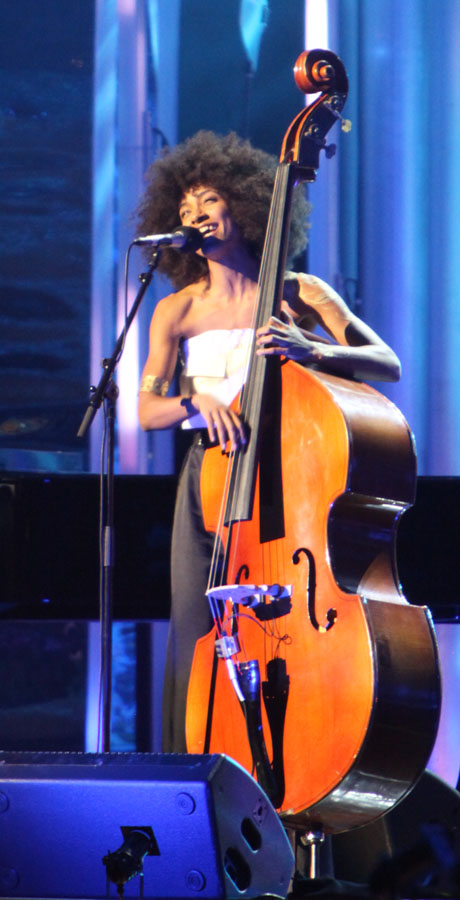
Spalding performs at the Nobel Peace Prize Concert of 2009

When asked in 2008 why she plays the bass instead of some other instrument, Spalding said that it was not a choice, but the bass "had its own arc" and resonated with her. Spalding has said that, for her, discovering the bass was like "waking up one day and realizing you're in love with a co-worker." By the time she randomly picked up the bass in music class and began experimenting with it, she had grown bored with her other instruments. Her band teacher showed her a blues line for the bass that she later used to secure her first gig. After that, she went in to play the bass daily and gradually fell in love.

Ratliff wrote in 2008 that one of Spalding's central gifts is "a light, fizzy, optimistic drive that's in her melodic bass playing and her elastic, small-voiced singing," but that "the music is missing a crucial measure of modesty." He added, "It's an attempt at bringing this crisscrossing [of Stevie Wonder and Wayne Shorter] to a new level of definition and power, but its vamps and grooves are a little obvious, and it pushes her first as a singer-songwriter, which isn't her primary strength."

Pat Metheny said in 2008 it was immediately obvious "that she had a lot to say [...] she has that rare 'x' factor of being able to transmit a certain personal kind of vision and energy that is all her own." Andrés Quinteros wrote in the Argentinian periodical 26Noticias in 2008 that Spalding is one of the greatest new talents on the jazz scene today. Patti Austin hired Spalding to tour with her internationally after Spalding's first semester at Berklee, where Spalding supported the singer on the Ella Fitzgerald tribute tour "For Ella".

In 2008, Spalding recalled the tour as educational, helping her learn to accompany a vocalist and also how to sustain energy and interest playing the same material nightly. She continued to perform with Austin periodically for three years. During the same period, while at Berklee, Spalding studied under saxophonist Joe Lovano, before eventually touring with him. They began as a trio, expanding into a quartet before joining quintet US5 and traveling across the United States from New York to California. As of 2008, she was also in the process of developing several courses for students at Berklee, including one learning harmony and theory through transcribing. Due to touring commitments, Spalding stopped giving classes at Berklee. She resides in both New York City and Austin, Texas.

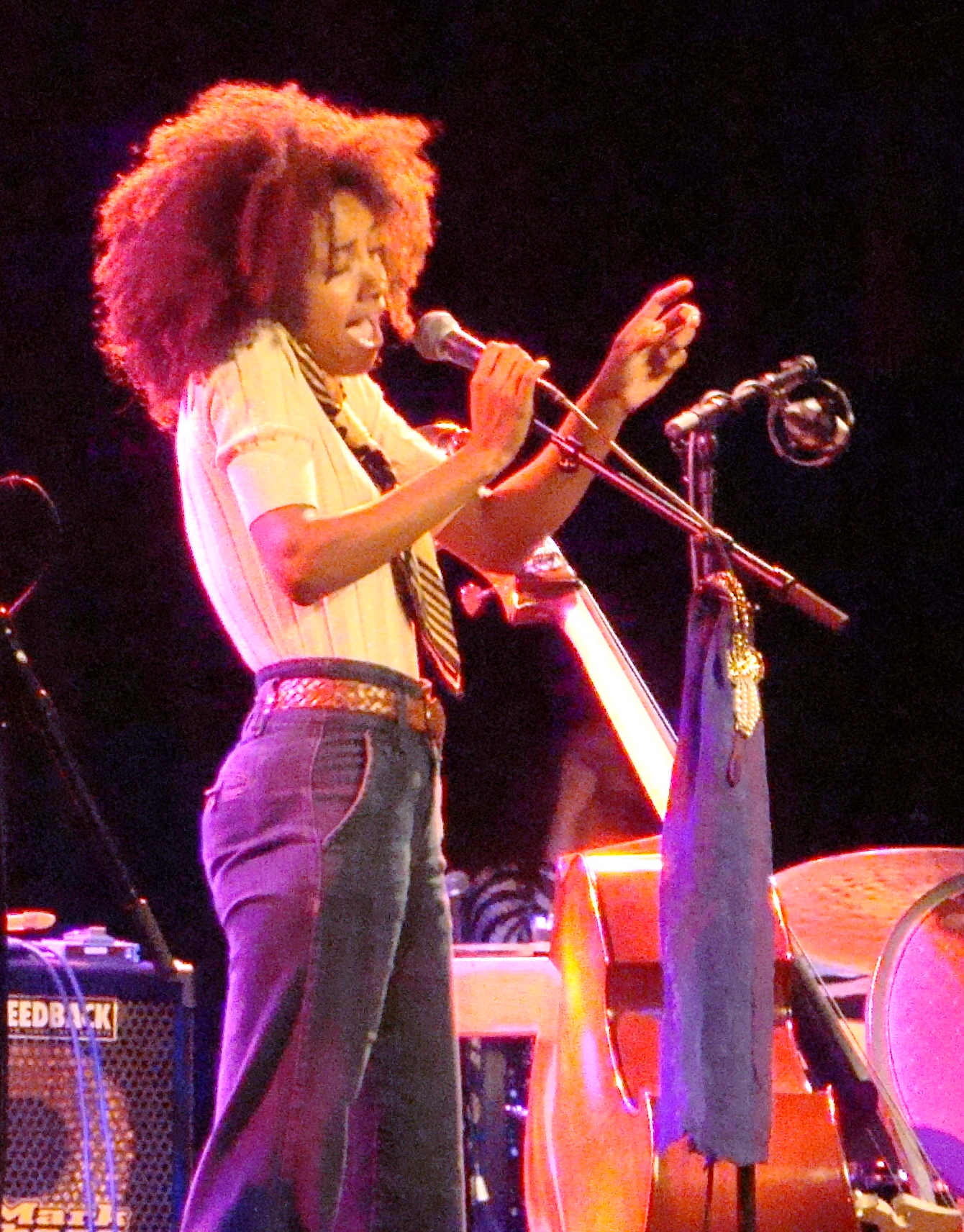
Spalding sings to the audience at the North Sea Jazz Festival, 2009

Esperanza is Spalding's second studio album. After Spalding's Grammy win in February 2011, the album entered the Billboard 200 at 138. With Esperanza, Spalding's material was meant to be more reflective of herself as an artist, with musicians selected to best present that material. Ed Morales from PopMatters wrote that Esperanza is "a sprawling collage of jazz fusion, Brazilian, and even a touch of hip-hop." Siddhartha Mitter wrote in The Boston Globe that Spalding's singing was noticeably different in Esperanza, making it more mainstream and attractive to a broader audience.

In December 2009, at the Nobel Peace Prize ceremonies, Spalding performed at Oslo City Hall in honor of the 2009 Laureate U.S. President Barack Obama, and again at the Nobel Peace Prize Concert the following day. She was personally selected by Obama, as per the tradition of having one laureate-invited-artist perform.

Spalding was also the featured final act for the opening night of the 2009 Park City Jazz Festival in Park City, Utah. She closed the show with a number along with bass artists Brian Bromberg and Sean O'Bryan Smith, who also performed earlier that day. As a tribute to Prince, Spalding was invited to sing along with Patti LaBelle, Alicia Keys and Janelle Monáe. Spalding performed the 1987 hit single "If I Was Your Girlfriend".

=== 2011–2015: Chamber Music Society and Radio Music Society ===
In 2011, Spalding collaborated with Tineke Postma on the track "Leave Me a Place Underground" from the album The Dawn of Light. She also collaborated with Terri Lyne Carrington on the album The Mosaic Project, where she features on the track "Crayola". Spalding also sang a duet with Nicholas Payton on the track "Freesia" from the 2011 album Bitches of Renaissance.

In the 53rd Grammy Awards that year, Spalding won the Grammy Award for Best New Artist.

Chamber Music Society is the third album by Spalding. After her Grammy win, the album re-entered the Billboard 200 at number 34 with sales of 18,000. A video was made for the song "Little Fly". The song is a poem by William Blake set to music by Spalding. A vinyl version of the album was released in February 2011. Commenting on the album, NPR Music's Patrick Jarenwattananon wrote that, "the finished product certainly exudes a level of sophisticated intimacy, as if best experienced with a small gathering in a quiet, wood-paneled room."

In November 2011, Spalding won "Jazz Artist of the Year" at the Boston Music Awards.

In February 2012, Spalding performed at the 84th Academy Awards, singing the Louis Armstrong standard "What a Wonderful World", alongside the Southern California Children's Chorus to accompany the video montage that celebrated the film industry greats who died in 2011 and early 2012.

Radio Music Society is Spalding's fourth studio album, released by Heads Up International in March 2012. Spalding hoped this album would showcase jazz musicians in an accessible manner suitable for mainstream radio.

In November 2013, Spalding released a single "We Are America" to protest the Guantánamo prison camps, with cameo performances by Stevie Wonder and Harry Belafonte. In 2015, she appeared on the NOVA production The Great Math Mystery, talking about the connection between music and mathematics.

=== 2016–present: Emily's D+Evolution, Exposure, and 12 Little Spells ===
In March 2016, Spalding released her fifth studio album, Emily's D+Evolution, a concept album featuring a funk rock sound. The album was co-produced by Spalding with longtime David Bowie collaborator Tony Visconti. On the album, Spalding sings through the alter ego of Emily (which is her middle name and childhood moniker), who she claims is a personification of a newfound innocence and authenticity to her composition. The album and corresponding tour featured musicians Matthew Stevens on guitar, Justin Tyson and Karriem Riggins on drums.

In July 2017, Spalding was appointed a professor of the Practice of Music at Harvard University. Five months later, in December, Spalding released Exposure, which is her sixth studio album. For this project, she embarked on a creative experiment beginning on September 12, 2017, setting out to create the album from start to finish in 77 consecutive hours, while streaming the whole creative process live on Facebook. Once completed, she released 7,777 limited edition recordings of the album. The packaging of the physical album included a piece of the original notepaper Esperanza used to write the lyrics and music, allowing those who witnessed the process to own a piece of the creation itself, directly from the source. About the experiment, Spalding stated that the live aspect of it forced her to be more creative, because there was no option to return to the same thing and try again.

From October 7–18, 2018, Spalding released twelve tracks—one per day—that together form her seventh studio album, 12 Little Spells. Each "spell" was accompanied by a music video released on her YouTube channel and correlates to a singular body part. Spalding described the album's experimental structure as a result of her gradual distancing from the title of an "artist", gravitating towards a concept-driven identity. On January 27, 2020, the album won the Grammy Award for Best Jazz Vocal Album.

In 2020 and 2021, Spalding worked with Wayne Shorter on a new operatic work titled Iphigenia, with Spalding writing the libretto. The opera premiered in select locations on both coasts of the United States in the fall of 2021 and in February 2022.

On September 24, 2022, National Sawdust hosted the premier of the opera, "A Good of Her Own Making," by Spalding and Jojo Abot.

On August 9, 2024, Spalding released a collaborative album, Milton + Esperanza, with Brazilian singer Milton Nascimento. In 2024, Spalding featured on the Odyssey album by Nubya Garcia.

Spalding was a nominee for the 2025 Grammys in the category of Jazz Vocal Album for her album Milton + Esperanza.

== Artistry ==
Spalding has an interest in the music of other cultures, including that of Brazil, where she once spent a month learning Portuguese. She has said that the melody and language of songs in Portuguese are inextricably connected. She sings in several languages, including English, Spanish, Portuguese, and French.

=== Influences ===
Spalding was mentored by Thara Memory. She has cited jazz bassists Ron Carter and Dave Holland as important influences on her music—Carter for the orchestration of his playing and Holland for the way his compositional method complements his personal style. She has described the saxophone player Wayne Shorter, and singer-songwriter Milton Nascimento, as heroes.

Spalding has said she loves fusion music and was influenced by a "wonderful arc that started 40 years ago [from 2008] where people kept incorporating modern sounds into their music." Spalding, who has expressed a desire to be judged for her musicianship rather than sex appeal, believes that in general, female musicians should try and present themselves in a strictly professional manner. In addition, to write original music, musicians must read and stay informed about the world. She has said she models her career on those of Madonna and Ornette Coleman, and also cited Joni Mitchell as a major musical inspiration. Spalding says that her mom was and will always be her role model.

=== Instruments ===
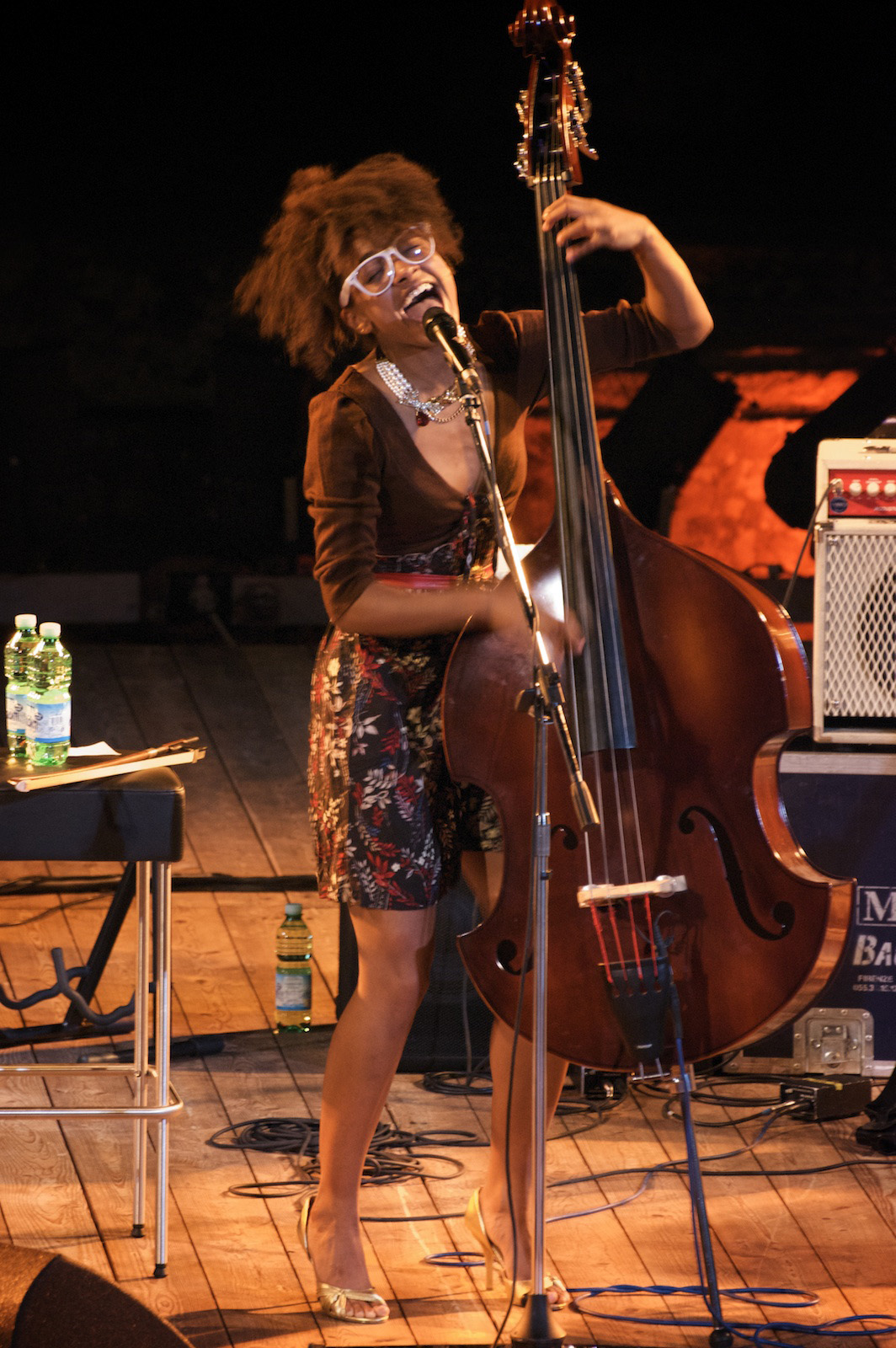
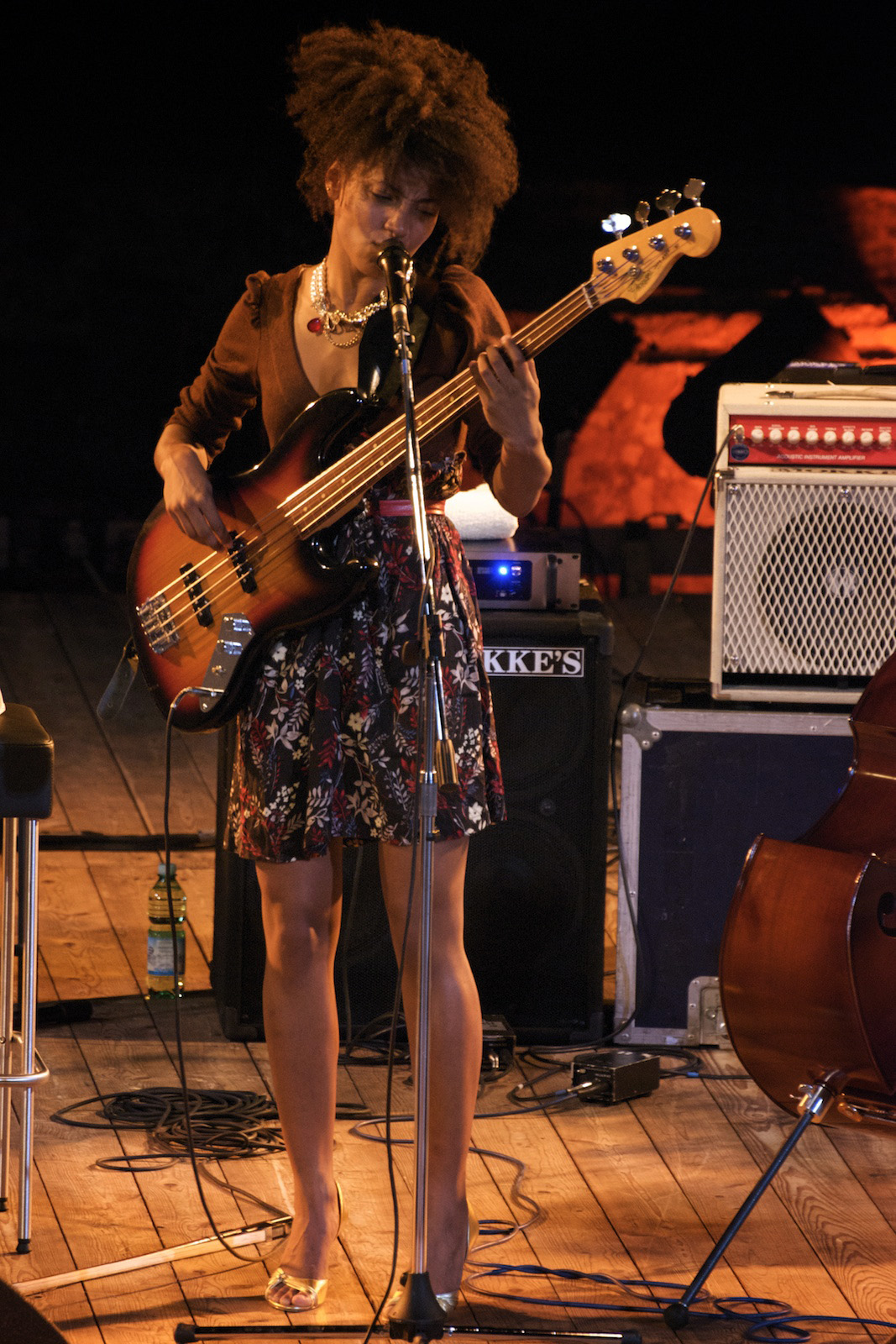
Spalding alternates between double bass and electric bass in her performances.

Electric bass

- Fender Jaco Pastorius Jazz Bass (fretless)
- South Paw Fretless 5-string
- Moollon Chambered Double P5 Fretless Bass

Acoustic Bass Guitar

- Doolin ABG4
- Godin A5 (semi-acoustic, 5-string, fretless)

Double bass

- 7/8 double bass (manufacturer unknown)
- Czech-Ease Standard model S1 acoustic road bass

Amplifiers

- Ampeg SVT-4PRO
- Ampeg PN-410HLF cab

Strings

- Fender 9050M Stainless Steel Flatwound Long Scale (.055–.105)

== Personal life ==
During her time as a student at Berklee she began dating fellow student and jazz trumpeter Christian Scott. They were in a relationship for four years. In a 2016 interview, Spalding stated she had residences in Brooklyn, New York, and Hillsboro, Oregon, the latter being where her family resides. She is a practitioner of the Soka Gakkai International (SGI) tradition of Nichiren Buddhism.

== Philanthropy ==
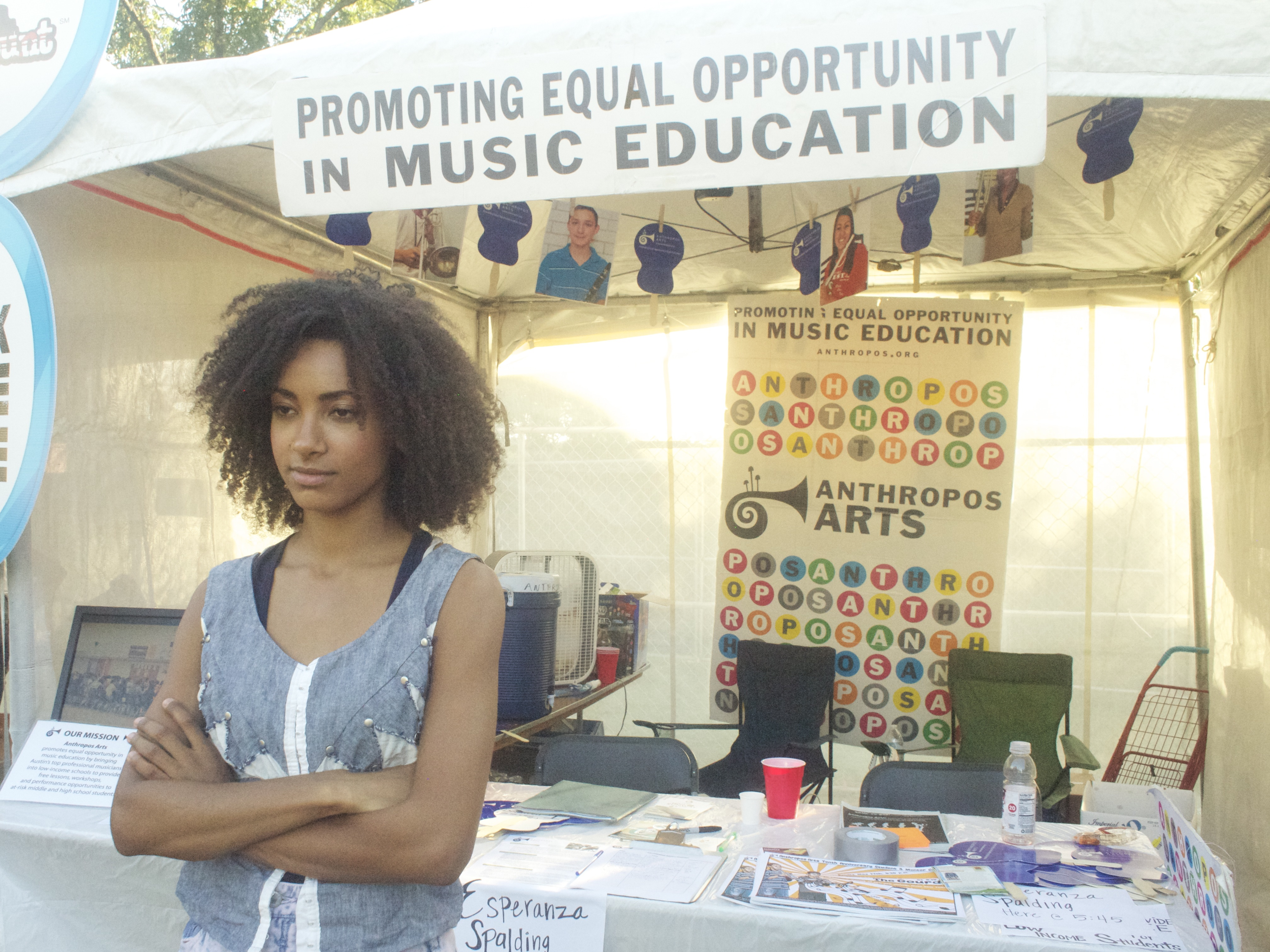
Spalding operating a music education booth at Austin City Limits Music Festival, 2012

During her 2012 tour, Spalding donated a portion of proceeds from merchandise sales to the non-profit organization Free the Slaves. The organization, based in Washington, D.C., works to combat human trafficking around the world. In 2013, she performed a benefit for the American Music Program Pacific Crest Jazz Orchestra, a music program founded by her mentor, Thara Memory.

On September 4, 2018, Spalding performed a benefit for Bienestar, a local housing and outreach non-profit based in Hillsboro, Oregon. Several weeks later, she appeared with Herbie Hancock at the Lions of Justice Festival, sponsored by Soka Gakkai International, to support the respect and dignified treatment of all people.

Spalding also is an advocate for parks and open spaces, and is a supporter of The Trust for Public Land.

=== Departure from Harvard ===
In November 2022, Spalding announced via email to department members that she would be resigning from her position. She cited a lack of motivation amongst Harvard administrators to incorporate her changes to the curriculums she taught, as well as their unwillingness to redistribute some of its subjugated land to create a safe space for artists of color.

== Discography ==
Studio albums

- Junjo (2006)
- Esperanza (2008)
- Chamber Music Society (2010)
- Radio Music Society (2012)
- Emily's D+Evolution (2016)
- Exposure (2017)
- 12 Little Spells (2018)
- Songwrights Apothecary Lab (2021)

Collaborative studio albums

- Milton + Esperanza with Milton Nascimento (2024)

== Accolades ==
Association	Nominated work	Year	Category	Result	Ref.
Boston Music Awards	Herself	2011	Jazz Artist of the Year	Won	
Grammy Awards	Herself	2011	Best New Artist	Won	
Grammy Awards	Bird Songs (Joe Lovano album)	2012	Best Jazz Instrumental Album	Nominated	
Grammy Awards	Radio Music Society	2013	Best Jazz Vocal Album	Won	
Grammy Awards	"City of Roses"	2013	Best Instrumental Arrangement Accompanying Vocalist(s)	Won	
Grammy Awards	"Radio Music Society"	2013	Best Long Form Music Video	Nominated	
Grammy Awards	12 Little Spells	2020	Best Jazz Vocal Album	Won	
Grammy Awards	12 Little Spells	2020	Best Arrangement, Instruments and Vocals	Nominated	
Grammy Awards	Songwrights Apothecary Lab	2022	Best Jazz Vocal Album	Won	
Grammy Awards	Live at the Detroit Jazz Festival (with Wayne Shorter, Terri Lyne Carrington, and Leo Genovese)	2023	Best Jazz Instrumental Album	Nominated	
Grammy Awards	Milton + Esperanza (with Milton Nascimento)	2025	Best Jazz Vocal Album	Nominated	
Smithsonian American Ingenuity Awards	Herself	2012	Performing Arts	Won	
Soul Train Music Awards	Herself	2012	Best Contemporary Jazz Artist/Group	Won	
Doris Duke Artist Award	Herself	2024	Jazz	Won	

== See also ==
- List of Afro-Latinos

== Sources ==
- Spalding, Esperanza; Fragoso, Sam (2016). Episode 26: Esperanza Spalding. Talk Easy.
