= Elena Pinderhughes =

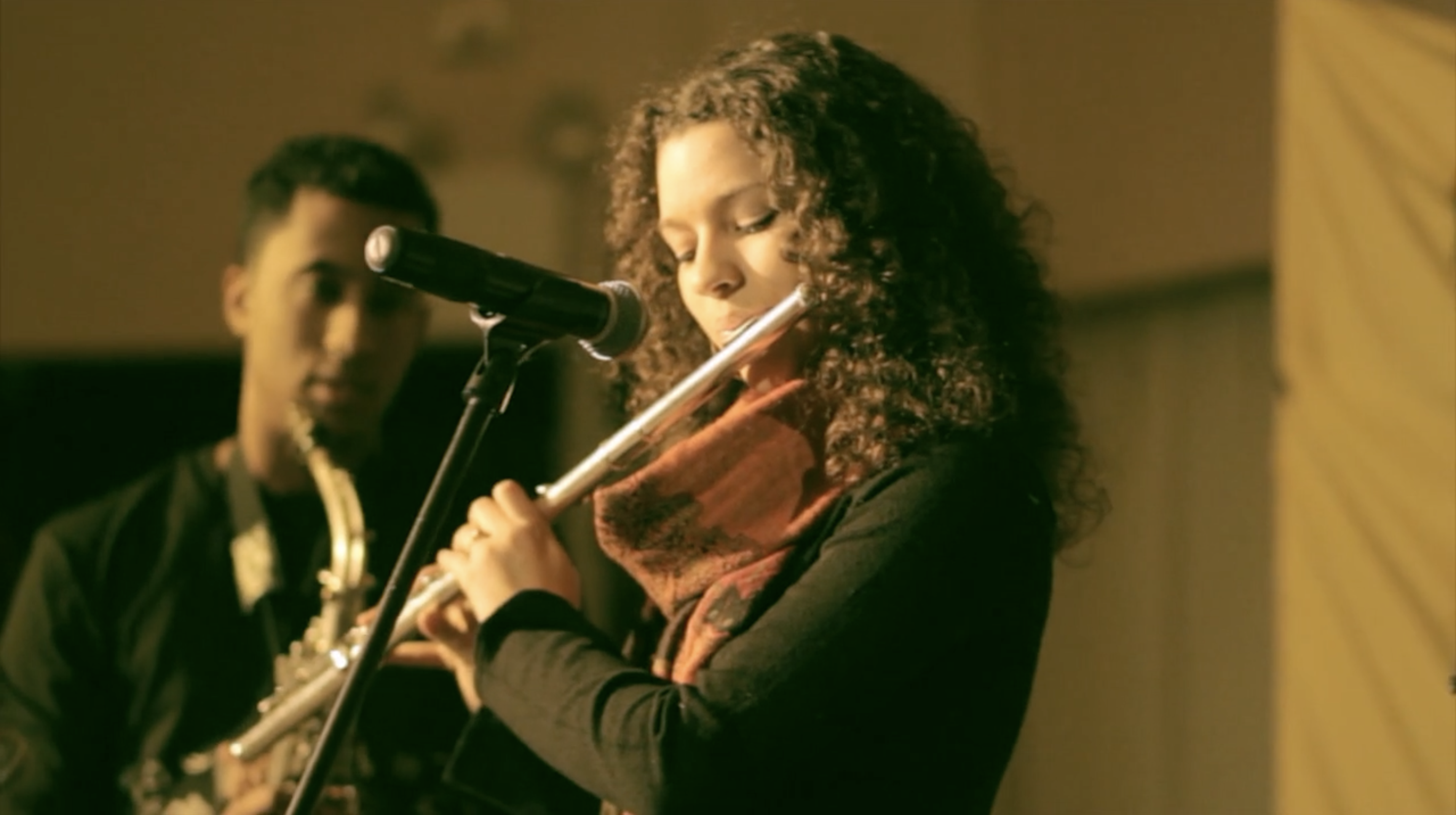
- Pinderhughes performing with Braxton Cook at the National Black Theatre in Harlem, 2014

Background information
- Born: Elena Pinderhughes; 1995 (age 29–30); Berkeley, California, U.S.
- Genres: Jazz; hip hop; R&B
- Occupations: Flutist; singer; composer
- Instruments: Flute; vocals; saxophone
- Years active: 2005-present
- Labels: SRP Music Group
- Website: www.thisiselena.org

Elena Pinderhughes (born 1995) is an American jazz flutist, singer, and composer. She has toured extensively with jazz trumpeter Chief Xian aTunde Adjuah and has also performed with Herbie Hancock, Common, Esperanza Spalding, Vijay Iyer, Lionel Loueke, Carlos Santana, and Josh Groban.

A former child prodigy, Pinderhughes was described by The Guardian in 2014 as "the most exciting jazz flautist to have emerged in years."

== Early life ==
Elena Pinderhughes was born in 1995 in Berkeley, California. Raised by professor and activist parents, she grew up in Berkeley with her older brother Samora Pinderhughes, a pianist. She is biracial.

Inspired by her brother to pursue music, she was first drawn to the flute after attending a Venezuelan concert at age four, and she began singing and playing flute at age seven. From ages 8 to 18, she attended the Young Musicians Choral Orchestra academy in the East Bay, where she studied flute and voice with a focus in jazz and classical music. After being named a Presidential Scholar, she moved to New York to attend the Manhattan School of Music.

== Career ==
When Elena and Samora Pinderhughes were 9 and 13 years old respectively, they professionally recorded their first album together, entitled Catch 22. At age 10, Elena Pinderhughes was featured in the HBO special The Music in Me, in which she played Latin jazz flute alongside other young musicians.

Upon moving to New York for college, Pinderhughes was propelled into the city's jazz scene, where she met and began collaborating with musicians such as Ambrose Akinmusire, Chief Xian aTunde Adjuah, and Terri Lyne Carrington. In 2015, Chief Xian aTunde Adjuah (then performing as Christian Scott) released an album featuring Pinderhughes titled Stretch Music, which he subtitled (Introducing Elena Pinderhughes). In 2016, Pinderhughes was named the number one "Rising Star" flutist in DownBeat magazine.

In October 2016, Pinderhughes performed in Common's NPR Tiny Desk Concert at the White House, alongside Robert Glasper, Bilal, Karriem Riggins, Derrick Hodge, and Keyon Harrold. She has also appeared in Tiny Desk Concerts by Chief Xian aTunde Adjuah in 2015, Zaytoven in 2019, and her brother Samora Pinderhughes in a virtual concert in 2022.

In September 2023, Pinderhughes performed a five-part suite titled "A Diaspora Journey" alongside Beninese guitarist Lionel Loueke at the Monterey Jazz Festival. Pinderhughes and Loueke also both performed with Herbie Hancock for his headlining set at the festival.

== Discography ==
=== As leader ===
- Catch 22 (2005) (with Samora Pinderhughes)

=== As featured musician ===
- Ambrose Akinmusire – The Imagined Savior Is Far Easier to Paint (2014)
- Tom Graf – Smokin' (2014)
- Chief Xian aTunde Adjuah – Stretch Music (2015)
- Common – Black America Again (2016)
- Ray Obiedo – Latin Jazz Project, Vol. 1 (2016)
- Chief Xian aTunde Adjuah – Diaspora (2017)
- Chief Xian aTunde Adjuah – Ruler Rebel (2017)
- Chief Xian aTunde Adjuah – The Emancipation Procrastination (2017)
- August Greene – August Greene (2018)
- Lupe Fiasco – Drogas Wave (2018)
- Chief Xian aTunde Adjuah – Ancestral Recall (2019)
- Taylor McFerrin – Love's Last Chance (2019)
- Chief Xian aTunde Adjuah – Axiom (2020)
- Childish Gambino – 3.15.20 (2020)
- Weedie Braimah – The Hands of Time (2021)
- Jon L. Smith – Yermo (2021)
- Terri Lyne Carrington – New Standards Vol. 1 (2022)
- Immanuel Wilkins – The 7th Hand (2022)
- Samora Pinderhughes – Grief (2022)
- Terrace Martin – Fine Tune (2023)
- Aja Monet – When the Poems Do What They Do (2023)
- Victoria Monét – Jaguar II (2023)
- Ben Wendel – All One (2023)
- American Fiction (2023)
- Yebba – Waterfall (I Adore You) (2023)
- Milton Nascimento and Esperanza Spalding – Milton + Esperanza (2024)
