= Bark Out Thunder Roar Out Lightning =

Studio album by Chief Xian aTunde Adjuah
- Released: July 28, 2023
- Studio: The Champagne Room West and Westlake Studios, Los Angeles, California, United States; Trombone Shorty Studios, New Orleans, Louisiana, United States
- Genre: Afro-jazz
- Length: 56:21
- Label: Ropeadope
- Producer: Chief Xian aTunde Adjuah

Chief Xian aTunde Adjuah chronology
Axiom (2020)	Bark Out Thunder Roar Out Lightning (2023)

"I'm born into a West African stylized chiefdom system that obviously has a relationship to the First Nations persons of this country. And being born into that particular cultural space in New Orleans, it kind of tethers you to the roots of a lot of these expressions, you know, the musical expressions that we're still contributing and building today."

—Chief Xian aTunde Adjuah on the influences for Bark Out Thunder Roar Out Lightning

Bark Out Thunder Roar Out Lightning is a 2023 album by American jazz musician Chief Xian aTunde Adjuah released by Ropeadope Records.

== Recording and release ==
This album is the first by Chief Xian aTunde Adjuah to not feature his signature instrument of trumpet. Instead, he crafted his own bowed string instrument and n'goni. The album explores his personal influences of both the music of his native New Orleans as well as West African music.

== Reception ==
Editors at Bandcamp chose this as Album of the Day, with critic John Morrison writing that it "gives us a glimpse of what a free, forward-looking Black musical form can be" and characterizing it as a "powerful melding of West African and Black American sensibilities"; the site also shortlisted it as one of the best jazz releases of July 2023. Andrew Sacher of BrooklynVegan included this as one of the notable releases of the week, writing that the album's mixture of "it's heavy on chanted vocals, polyrhythmic percussion, and the same interest in sound manipulation that he had in his jazz era" as well as "elements of popular American-centric music, from fuzzed-out rock guitars to electronic-seeming drums" works as the artist "has a way of making it sound compelling even to listeners who would otherwise be unfamiliar with the types of things he's referencing". Writing for Glide Magazine, Jim Hynes summed up his review "even the most ardent Chief Adjuah fans may not quite be ready for this non-jazz offering, but it proves increasingly infectious with repeated listens and marks yet another step forward for one of the most innovative artists of our time". In The New York Times, Giovanni Russonello called this release "a paean" to the legacy of Black Indian music, "and an announcement of how he plans to carry the torch forward". At Stereogum, editors chose to focus on this release for their monthly jazz review, connecting the work to other African-influenced jazz from America and critic Phil Freeman wrote that "it's possible to draw a line from Rewind That to Bark Out Thunder Roar Out Lightning and understand it all as part of one long narrative of reclamation, of declaration, of mourning and celebration and braggadocio and resistance, that is both uniquely New Orleans and deeply universal and human". In The Wall Street Journal, Larry Blumenfeld called the compositions "hypnotic" and praised the invented instruments.

Giovanni Russonello named this the best jazz album of 2023 in The New York Times. At Bandcamp, this album was chosen as one of the essential releases in their best albums of 2023 list. Phil Freeman of Stereogum asked jazz musicians to list their best jazz albums of the year and Lafayette Gilchrist included this album.

== Track listing ==
All songs written by Chief Xian aTunde Adjuah.

1. "Blood Calls Blood" – 7:40
2. "Trouble That Mornin'" – 4:39
3. "Xodokan Iko – Hu Na Ney" – 3:57
4. "Bark Out Thunder Roar Out Lightning" – 15:22
5. "Shallow Water [Tribute Big Chief Donald Harrison Sr. – Guardians of the Flame]" – 6:13
6. "On to New Orleans [Runnin' in 7's Redux]" – 3:19
7. "End Simulation" – 3:29
8. "Ashé Chief Donald [Tribute Big Chief Donald Harrison Jr. – Congo Square Nation]" – 2:31
9. "Golden Crown [Chief Xian aTunde Adjuah – Xodokan Nation]" – 3:56
10. "Bark Out Thunder Roar Out Lightning [Duo]" – 5:15

== Personnel ==
- Chief Xian aTunde Adjuah – Chief Adjuah's bow, Chief Adjuah's N'Goni, SPDSX, pan-African drum kit, bells, tambourine, percussion, synth percussion, vocals, sound design, production, executive production, concept ideation

Additional musicians

- Weedie Braimah – djembe, congas, tambourine, dun duns, percussion, and vocals on "Xodokan Iko – Hu Na Ney", "Bark Out Thunder Roar Out Lightning", "Shallow Water [Tribute Big Chief Donald Harrison Sr. – Guardians of the Flame]", "On to New Orleans [Runnin' in 7's Redux]", "Ashé Chief Donald [Tribute Big Chief Donald Harrison Jr. – Congo Square Nation]", and "Golden Crown [Chief Xian aTunde Adjuah – Xodokan Nation]"
- Luques Curtis – bass, guembri, and vocals on "Trouble That Mornin'" "Xodokan Iko – Hu Na Ney", "Shallow Water [Tribute Big Chief Donald Harrison Sr. – Guardians of the Flame]", "Ashé Chief Donald [Tribute Big Chief Donald Harrison Jr. – Congo Square Nation]", and "Golden Crown [Chief Xian aTunde Adjuah – Xodokan Nation]"
- Joe Dyson Jr. – pan-African drum kit on "On to New Orleans [Runnin' in 7's Redux]"
- Lioness Sia Fodey – vocals "Xodokan Iko – Hu Na Ney", "Shallow Water [Tribute Big Chief Donald Harrison Sr. – Guardians of the Flame]", and "Golden Crown [Chief Xian aTunde Adjuah – Xodokan Nation]"
- Corey Fonville – drums on "On to New Orleans [Runnin' in 7's Redux]"
- Marcus Gillmore – drums on "Xodokan Iko – Hu Na Ney" and "Shallow Water [Tribute Big Chief Donald Harrison Sr. – Guardians of the Flame]"
- Elé Howell – pan-African drum kit, drums, bells, tambourines, and vocals on "Xodokan Iko – Hu Na Ney", "Shallow Water [Tribute Big Chief Donald Harrison Sr. – Guardians of the Flame]", "Ashé Chief Donald [Tribute Big Chief Donald Harrison Jr. – Congo Square Nation]", "Golden Crown [Chief Xian aTunde Adjuah – Xodokan Nation]", and "Bark Out Thunder Roar Out Lightning [Duo]"
- Alfred Jordan – drums, percussion, tambourine, and vocals on "Xodokan Iko – Hu Na Ney", "Shallow Water [Tribute Big Chief Donald Harrison Sr. – Guardians of the Flame]", "Ashé Chief Donald [Tribute Big Chief Donald Harrison Jr. – Congo Square Nation]", and "Golden Crown [Chief Xian aTunde Adjuah – Xodokan Nation]"
- Amyna Love – vocals on "Xodokan Iko – Hu Na Ney", "Shallow Water [Tribute Big Chief Donald Harrison Sr. – Guardians of the Flame]", and "Golden Crown [Chief Xian aTunde Adjuah – Xodokan Nation]"
- Brian Richburg Jr. – drums, SPDSX, percussion, tambourines, and vocals on "Blood Calls Blood", "Xodokan Iko – Hu Na Ney", "Shallow Water [Tribute Big Chief Donald Harrison Sr. – Guardians of the Flame]", "End Simulation", "Ashé Chief Donald [Tribute Big Chief Donald Harrison Jr. – Congo Square Nation]", and "Golden Crown [Chief Xian aTunde Adjuah – Xodokan Nation]"
- Amina Scott – vocals on "Xodokan Iko – Hu Na Ney", "Shallow Water [Tribute Big Chief Donald Harrison Sr. – Guardians of the Flame]", and "Golden Crown [Chief Xian aTunde Adjuah – Xodokan Nation]"
- Trail Chief Kiel Adrian Scott – percussion and vocals on "Xodokan Iko – Hu Na Ney", "Shallow Water [Tribute Big Chief Donald Harrison Sr. – Guardians of the Flame]", "Ashé Chief Donald [Tribute Big Chief Donald Harrison Jr. – Congo Square Nation]", and "Golden Crown [Chief Xian aTunde Adjuah – Xodokan Nation]"
- Mizan Willis – dun duns, bells, shekere, percussion, and vocals on "Xodokan Iko – Hu Na Ney", "Shallow Water [Tribute Big Chief Donald Harrison Sr. – Guardians of the Flame]", and "Golden Crown [Chief Xian aTunde Adjuah – Xodokan Nation]"

Technical personnel

- Eric Ryan Anderson – photography
- Paul Blakemore – mastering in Cleveland, Ohio, United States
- Landon Edwards – assistant photography
- Colin Fatke – assistant photography
- Cara Harrison Daniels – executive production
- Chris Finney – recording at Trombone Shorty Studios, New Orleans, Louisiana, United States
- Eric Hurtgen – design
- Louis H. Marks – executive production
- Devan Mayfield – creative direction, concept ideation
- Qmillion – mixing at Flyin' Dread Studios, Los Angeles, CA
- Kiel Adrian Scott – concept ideation
- Dave Weingarten – recording at The Champagne Room West and Westlake Studios, Los Angeles, California, United States, mixing at The Champagne Room

== See also ==
- 2023 American music
- List of 2023 albums

== Notes ==
Percussion instruments include agboba, atsimevu, Batá drum, dundunba, ewe drums, kaganu, kalimba, kenkeni, kidi, mande drums, mbira, sangban, and sogo
