= Ninety Miles Project =

2011 jazz album and documentary film

Ninety Miles

Studio album by Christian Scott, David Sánchez, Stefon Harris, Harold Lopez Nussa, Rember Duharte
- Released: 21 June 2011
- Recorded: 2010
- Genre: jazz, Latin jazz
- Label: Concord Records
- Producer: John Burk, Chris Dunn

Christian Scott chronology
Yesterday You Said Tomorrow (2010)	Ninety Miles (2011)	Christian aTunde Adjuah (2012)

Professional ratings
Review scores
Source	Rating
Allmusic	4/5 stars

Ninety Miles Project is both a jazz album and documentary film recorded on Havana, Cuba, in May 2010, and features American jazz artists Christian Scott, Stefon Harris, and David Sánchez. The project also features Cuban composers and artists Rember Duharte and Harold Lopez Nussa. The album was released in 2010 on Concord Picante Records. The follow-up record, Ninety Miles Live at Cubadisco, was released on September 24, 2012.

== Background ==
The name alludes to the stretch of waters between America, Puerto Rico, and Cuba. The project extends a larger, more organic story—of jazz as a conduit for connection between the U.S. and Cuba and an expression of common roots—which is as old as the music itself, and which has been altered and often severely curtailed during the last half-century, due to travel restrictions related to the continuing U.S. embargo of Cuba.

The American members of Ninety Miles continue to tour, including shows at The Clifford Brown Jazz Festival, The Atlanta Jazz Festival, and at the Hollywood Bowl opening for Arturo Sandoval and The Buena Vista Social Club.

== Reception ==
In late 2011 both Downbeat Magazine and Jazziz Magazine featured cover stories on the project with Jazziz Magazine stating that the hyperkinetic polyrhythms laid down by pianist Rember Duharte's group on the opening track, "Ñengueleru," clearly distinguish this set from a conventional Latin-jazz date.

In his review of the album, Dave Gelly of the Observer wrote "Ninety miles is the distance separating Cuba from the US. After much hassle, these three US-based jazz musicians got to play with their Cuban counterparts in Havana and this is the result. It's well known that standards are ferociously high in Cuba, and the sheer sophistication of the musical dialogue is hugely impressive".

== Track listing ==
1. Nengueleru (5:03) (written by Rember Duharte)
2. E'Cha (4:14) (Harold Lopez-Nussa)
3. City Sunrise (6:45) (David Sanchez)
4. The Forgotten Ones (3:52) (David Sanchez)
5. Black Action Figure (6:21) (Stefon Harris)
6. Congo (6:28) (Rember Duharte)
7. And This Too Shall Pass (9:28) (Stefon Harris)
8. Brown Belle Blues (4:59) (Stefon Harris)
9. La Fiesta Va (5:48) (Harold Lopez-Nussa)

== Album personnel ==
- Stefon Harris – vibraphone
- David Sanchez – tenor saxophone
- Christian Scott – trumpet (except "The Forgotten Ones" and "La Fiesta Va")

(Tracks 1, 6, & 8)

- Rember Duharte – piano, vocals (track 6)
- Osmar Salazar – electric bass
- Eduardo Barroetabena – drums
- Jean Roberto San Miguel – bata, congas, percussion

(Tracks 2, 3, 5, 7, & 9)

- Harold Lopez-Nussa – piano
- Yandy Martinez Gonzalez – bass
- Ruy Adrian Lopez-Nussa – drums
- Edgar Martinez Ochoa – congas, djembe, percussion, bata (track 4)

== Chart performance ==
Chart (2011)	Position
Jazz Albums (Billboard)	13
