= Grammy Award for Best Spoken Word Poetry Album =

Award

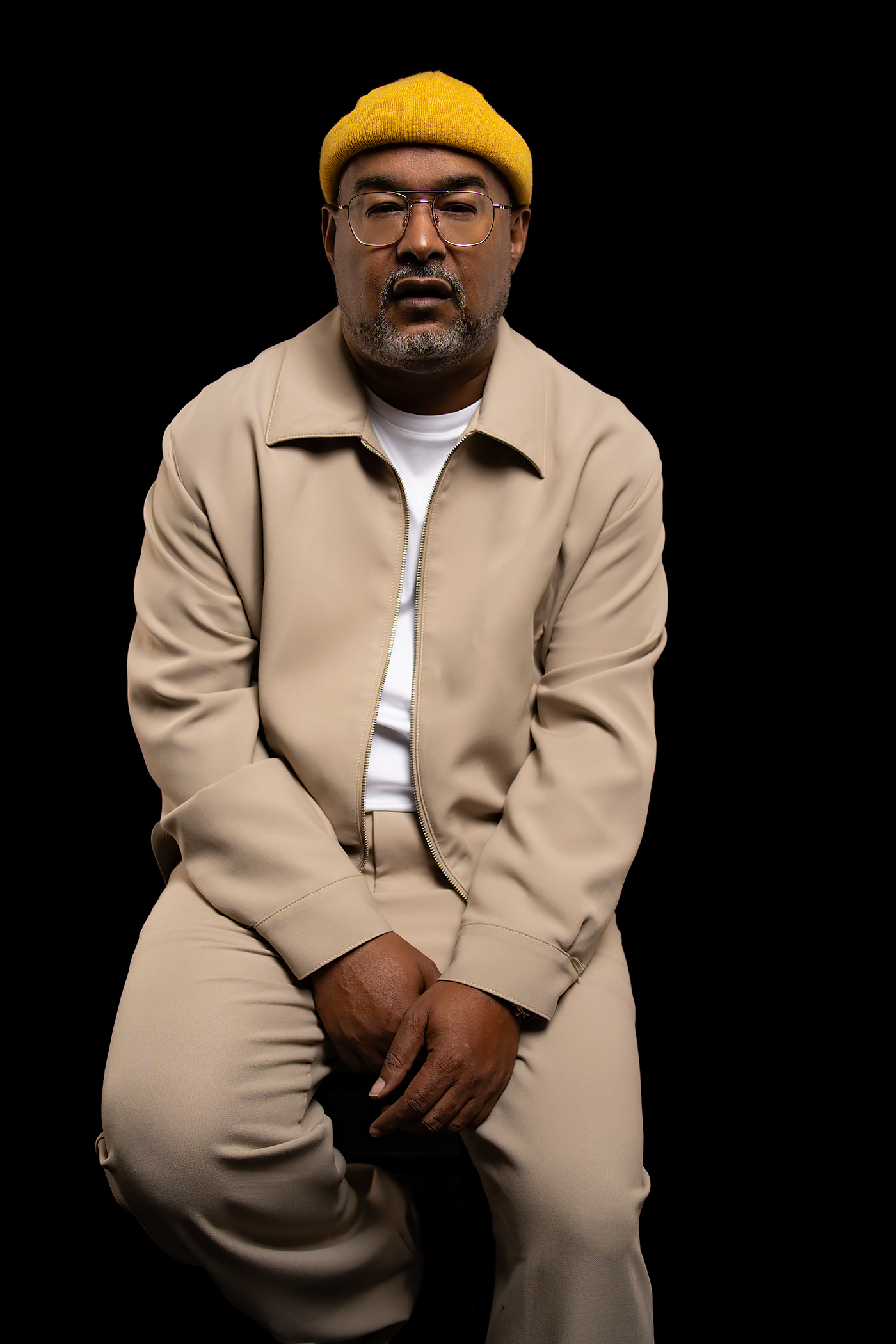
- Words for Days Vol. 1 by Mad Skillz (pictured) is the most recent recipient
- Awarded for: Quality spoken word poetry recordings
- Presented by: National Academy of Recording Arts and Sciences
- First award: 2023
- Currently held by: Mad Skillz – Words for Days Vol. 1 (2026)
- Website: grammy.com

The Grammy Award for Best Spoken Word Poetry Album is a category in the annual Grammy Awards, that was first presented at the 2023 show on February 5, 2023.

== Criteria ==
According to the Recording Academy, this new category "recognizes excellence in spoken word albums specific to the performance of poetry with or without music."

== History ==
Up to and including the 64th Grammy Awards, all spoken word recordings fell under one category, the Best Spoken Word Album. As of 2023, the Spoken Word category has been renamed Best Audio Book, Narration & Storytelling Recording. This category recognizes excellence in spoken word albums, but no longer includes spoken word poetry. The category was authored by and created due to six years of advocacy within the Recording Academy by poet J. Ivy, who then went on to win the first two years of the category's existence.

== Recipients ==
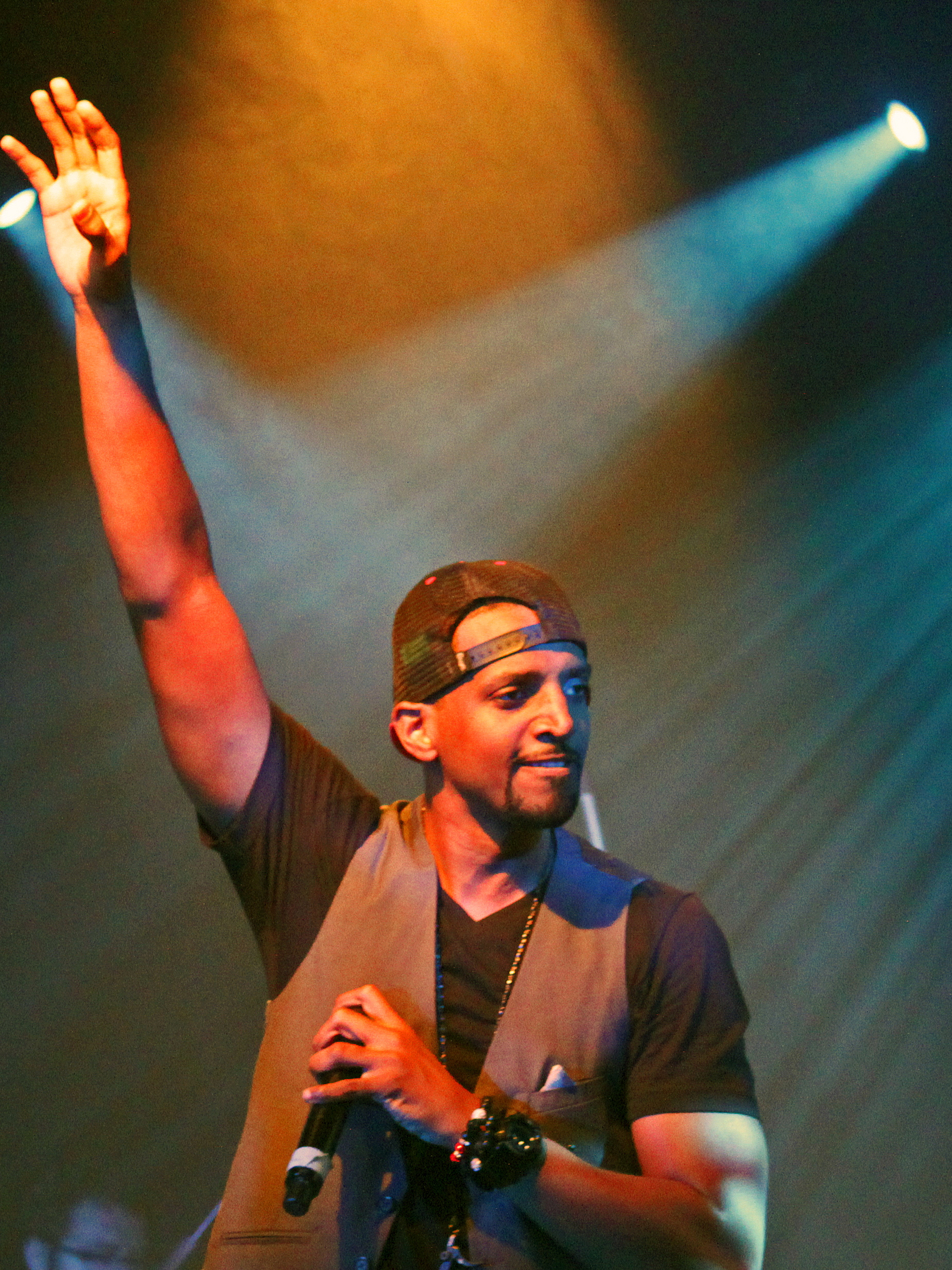
Two-time winner J. Ivy, performing in 2012

Year	Work	Artist
2023	The Poet Who Sat by the Door	J. Ivy
2023	Black Men Are Precious	Ethelbert Miller
2023	Call Us What We Carry: Poems	Amanda Gorman
2023	Hiding in Plain View	Malcolm-Jamal Warner
2023	You Will Be Someone's Ancestor. Act Accordingly.	Amir Sulaiman
2024	The Light Inside	J. Ivy
2024	A-You're Not Wrong B-They're Not Either: The Fukc-It Pill Revisited	Queen Sheba
2024	For Your Consideration'24 - The Album	Prentice Powell and Shawn William
2024	Grocery Shopping With My Mother	Kevin Powell
2024	When the Poems Do What They Do	Aja Monet
2025	The Heart, The Mind, The Soul	Tank and the Bangas
2025	Civil Writes: The South Got Something to Say	Queen Sheba
2025	Concrete & Whiskey Act II Part 1: A Bourbon 30 Series	Omari Hardwick
2025	Good M.U.S.I.C. Universe Sonic Sinema Episode 1: In the Beginning Was the Word	Malik Yusef
2025	The Seven Number Ones	Mad Skillz
2026	Words for Days Vol. 1	Mad Skillz
2026	A Hurricane in Heels: Healed people don't act like that — (partially recorded live @City Winery & other places)	Queen Sheba
2026	Black Shaman	Marc Marcel
2026	Pages	Omari Hardwick and Anthony Hamilton
2026	Saul Williams Meets Carlos Niño & Friends at Treepeople	Saul Williams, Carlos Niño and Friends
2027	Black Shaman Strikes Back	Marc Marcel
2027	The Color of Rain	Aja Monet
2027	A Hero and a Villain	Mad Skillz
2027	How Love Grows	Jwalt and ClayDough
2027	Leap Life	Saul Williams

^{^[I]} Each year is linked to the article about the Grammy Awards held that year.

== Artists with multiple wins ==
2 wins

- J. Ivy

== Artists with multiple nominations ==
3 nominations

- Mad Skillz
- Queen Sheba

2 nominations

- Omari Hardwick
- J. Ivy
- Marc Marcel
- Aja Monet
- Saul Williams
