= Luques Curtis =

American jazz bassist

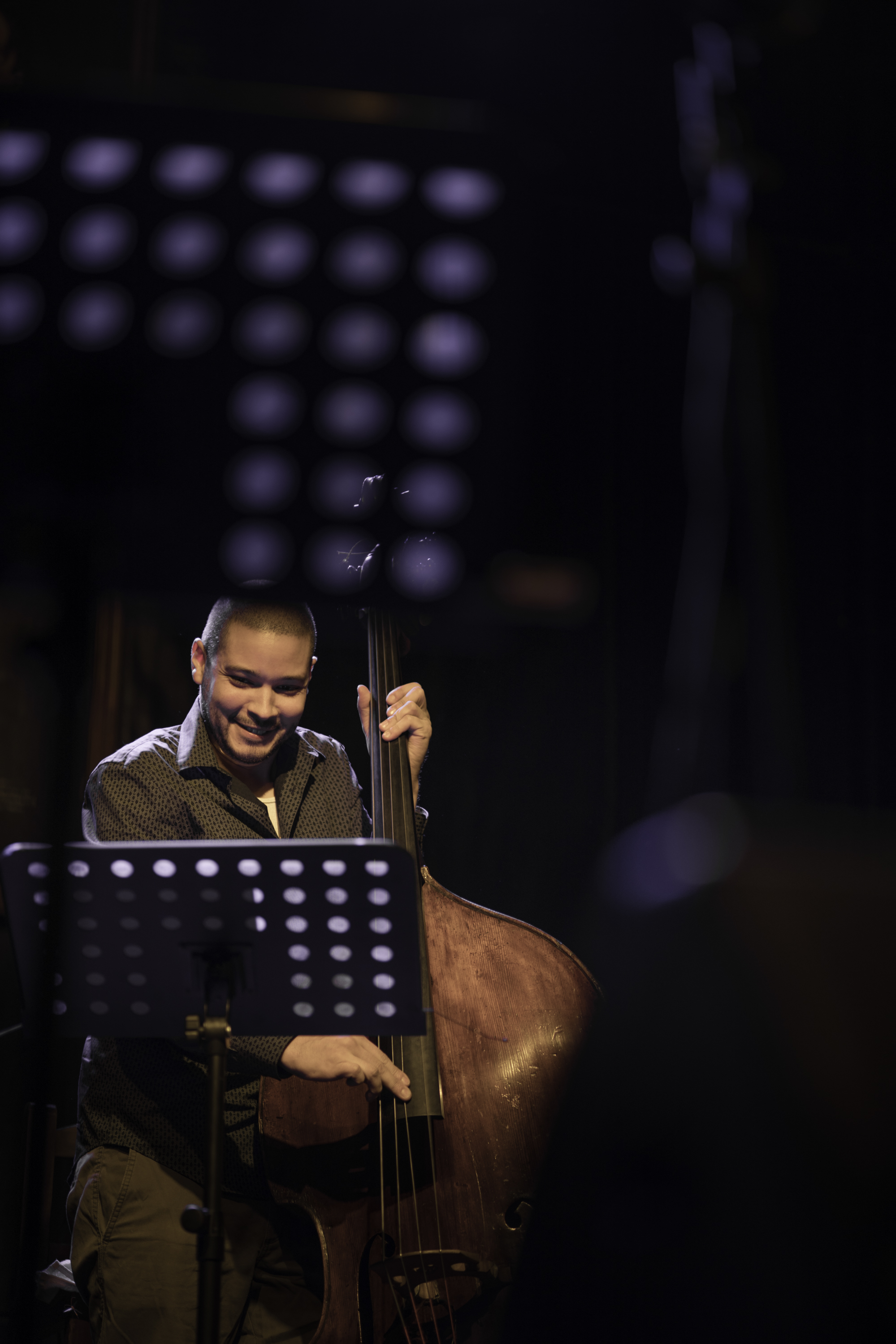

Background information
- Born: Luques Curtis; August 17, 1983 (age 43); Hartford, Connecticut, United States
- Genres: Jazz, Salsa, Latin jazz, World music
- Occupations: Musician, composer, record label CEO
- Instruments: Double bass, Bass
- Years active: 1995–present
- Label: Truth Revolution Records
- Website: luquescurtis.com

Luques Curtis (born August 17, 1983) is an American bassist from Hartford, Connecticut. Now based in New York City, Luques has been performing nationally and internationally with artists such as Eddie Palmieri, Ralph Peterson, Jr, Christian Scott, Gary Burton, and others. He is one of the owners and co-founders of independent jazz label Truth Revolution Records.

== Biography ==
Luques was born in Hartford, Connecticut and raised in the neighboring town of Windsor. He began playing the bass at 12 years old and attended the Greater Hartford Academy of the Arts and the Artists Collective, Inc. founded by Jackie McLean and Paul (PB) Brown. After high school, he earned a full scholarship to the prestigious Berklee College of Music, where he studied with John Lockwood and Ron Mahdi. While in Boston, he was also able to work with great musicians such as Gary Burton, Ralph Peterson, Donald Harrison, Christian Scott, and Francisco Mela. Luques collaborated with his older brother Zaccai Curtis and formed a group called Insight. The group released their first album ‘A Genesis’ in 2006 and then also formed The Curtis Brothers and The Curtis Brothers Quartet. They have released multiple records with their groups on their record label Truth Revolution Records.

== Discography ==
=== As co-leader ===
Insight

- A Genesis (2006)

Curtis Brothers

- Blood, Spirit, Land, Water, Freedom (2009)
- Completion of Proof (2012)

=== As sideman ===
Eddie Palmieri

- Sabiduria/Wisdom (2017)
- Full Circle (2018)
- Mi Luz Mayor (2018)

Bill O'Connell

- Rhapsody In Blue (2010)
- Zocalo (2013)
- Imagine (2014)
- Latin Jazz All Stars (2016)

Dave Valentin

- Come Fly with Me (2006)

Zhenya Strigalev

- The Change (2019)

Sean Jones

- Roots (2006)
- Kaleidoscope (2007)
- The Search Within (2009)
- No Need For Words (2011)
- Im*pro*vise (2014)

Albert Rivera

- Re-Introduction (2008)
- Inner Peace (2010)

Miguel Zenon

- Identities Are Changeable (2014)

Scott Tixier

- Cosmic Adventure (2016)

Matt Garrison

- Familiar Places (2010)

Louis Fouché

Subjective Mind (2012)

Orrin Evans

- Faith In Action (2010)
- Captain Black Big Band - Captain Black Big Band (2011)
- "...It was beauty" (2013)
- Captain Black Big Band - Mother's Touch (2014)
- Liberation Blues (2014)

Carlos Martin

- The Journey (2013)

Kervin Barreto

- First Impulse (2010)

Ali Bello

- Caracas - New York (2013)

Mitch Frohman

- From Daddy with Love (2013)

Natalie Fernandez

- Nuestro Tango (2014)

Sonora Latina

- Con Clave Para Bailar (2012)

Takuji Yamada

- Lite Blue (2008)

Soren Moller

- Résumé (2012)

Nicole Zuraitis

- Spread The Word (2012)

Ed Fast

- Straight Shot (2007)

John Santos

- La Esperanza (2011)

Chris Dempsey

- Onward (2008)

Francisco Mela

- Tree Of Life (2011)

Donald Harrison

- The Survivor (2006)

Darryl Yokley

- The Void (2012)

Romain Collin

- The Calling (2013)
- Press Enter (2015)

Jimmy Greene

- The Overcomer's Suite (2008)

Ralph Peterson

- The Duality Perspective (2012)

Shimrit Shoshan

- Keep It Movin' (2010)

Nils Weinhold

- Shapes (2011)

Gary Burton

- Next Generation (2005)

Christian Scott

- Rewind That (2006)
- Anthem (2007)
- Ruler Rebel (2017)
- The Emancipation Procrastination (2017)

Brian Lynch

- Simpactico (2006)
- Con Clave Vol. 2 (2010)

Dana Lauren

- It's You Or No One (2010)

Kris Allen

- Circle House (2011)

Andrei Matorin

- Opus (2009)

Samuel Bonnet

- Diasporapsodie (2014)

Brian Hogans

- Evidence Of Things To Come (2010)

David Weiss

- Venture Inward (2013)

Laine Cooke

- The Music Is The Magic (2014)

Eva Cortés

- In Bloom (2015)

Joanna Pascale

- Wildflower (2015)

Gian-Carla Tisera

- Nora La Bella (2014)

Lisa Hilton

- life is beautiful (2022)

=== Compilations ===
- Together (2012)
