= Ancestral Recall =

Ancestral Recall may refer to:

- Ancestral Recall, one of the Power Nine Magic: The Gathering cards
- Ancestral Recall (album), by Christian Scott, 2019
