= Axiom (Christian Scott album) =

Live album by Christian Scott
- Released: August 28, 2020
- Recorded: March 11–15, 2020
- Venue: Blue Note Jazz Club, NYC
- Genre: Jazz
- Length: 1:18:00
- Label: Ropeadope Records
- Producer: Christian aTunde Adjuah

Christian Scott chronology
Ancestral Recall (2019)	Axiom (2020)	Bark Out Thunder Roar Out Lightning (2023)

Professional ratings
Review scores
Source	Rating
All About Jazz	5/5 stars
AllMusic	4.5/5 stars
DownBeat	5/5 stars
Jazzwise	3/5 stars
Le Devoir	3.5/5 stars
Tom Hull	B+

Axiom is a live album by American jazz musician Christian Scott released on August 28, 2020 by Ropeadope Records label. The album is also available in a special deluxe edition and as a vinyl release.

== Background ==
Axiom is his third live release and contains a collection of tracks recorded in March 2020 in the New York's Blue Note Jazz Club during Scott's final pre-pandemic concert. The album was released to support his previous 2019 album Ancestral Recall. The concert saw Adjuah on trumpet as well as Elena Pinderhughes on flute, Alex Han on saxophone, Weedie Braimah on djembe, Lawrence Fields on piano, Kris Funn on bass, and Corey Fonville on drums. In a press release Scott explained "Axioms are essentially postulates from which an abstractly defined structure is based, a statement or proposition which is regarded as self-evidently true…Axioms serve as starting points for further reasoning and arguments. It’s difficult to find a more appropriate correlative to jazz and expansive music." Axiom consists of nine tracks. "Sunrise in Beijing" and "Diaspora" have originally appeared in Stretch Music (2015); "I Own the Night" is taken from the previous album Ancestral Recall (2019). "Guinnevere" is a composition that was originally written by singer-songwriter David Crosby; it is also related to Miles Davis, who interpreted it in his compilation album Circle in the Round (1979).

== Reception ==
Jim Hynes in his review for Glide Magazine stated, "Chief Adjuah made the right decision to put this live disc out. Somehow it makes his music, often abstract for many, more tangible, more accessible, and eminently more powerful too." Rob Shepherd of PostGenre wrote, "It suggests a new approach to sound, one even less defined by rigid categories. Instead, it builds off of the theory that if the underlying musical concept is of value, all that extends from it must be equally worthy. In the interim, it provides much to consider." Guillaume Bourgault-Côté of Le Devoir observed, "Scott relies on the material from his Ancestral Recall album to deploy this "stretch music" which is his: incandescent jazz with tribal rhythms, a sort of sound crossroads of Afro-American, native, West African music and everything that feeds Christian Scott in this quest that is both spiritual, musical and political."

The album was nominated for the 63rd Annual Grammy Awards as the Best Contemporary Instrumental Album. PopMatters included the album in its list of "20 jazz albums you might have missed in 2020."

== Track listing ==
All tracks are written by Christian Scott except track 3 written by David Crosby.

Axiom track listing
No.	Title	Length
1.	"X. Adjuah (I Own the Night)"	9:52
2.	"The Last Chieftain (for Big Chiefs Donald Harrison Sr. & Jr.)"	16:06
3.	"Guinnevere"	10:53
4.	"Songs She Never Heard"	9:39
5.	"Sunrise in Beijing"	4:47
6.	"Huntress (for Cara)"	9:17
7.	"Incarnation (Chief Adjuah — Idi of the Xodokan)"	6:45
8.	"Diaspora"	5:49
9.	"Introductions"	0:35
Total length:		1:18:00

== Personnel ==
- Christian Scott aTunde Adjuah – flugelhorn, trumpet, siren, percussion
- Weedie Braimah – djembe, congas, bata
- Corey Fonville – drums, sampler [SPDSX]
- Elena Pinderhughes – flute
- Lawrence Fields – piano, electric piano, keyboards
- Kris Funn – bass
- Qmillion – mixing
