= Matthew Stevens (musician) =

Canadian jazz guitarist and composer (born 1982)

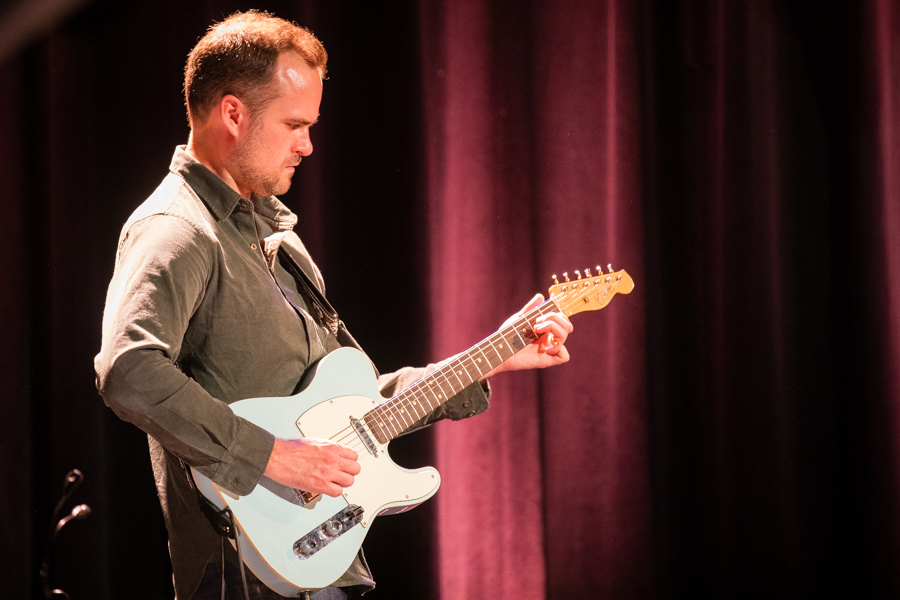
- Stevens performing in Oslo in 2019

Background information
- Also known as: Matt Stevens
- Born: January 8, 1982 (age 44)
- Origin: Toronto, Ontario, Canada
- Genres: Jazz
- Occupations: Musician; composer
- Instrument: Guitar
- Years active: c. 2004–present
- Labels: Whirlwind Recordings; Crystal Math Music Group
- Website: mattstevensmusic.com

Matthew Stevens (born 1982) is a Canadian jazz guitarist and composer.

== Biography ==
Stevens was born on 8 January 1982 in Toronto, Ontario, Canada, and studied piano and guitar at a young age. Since graduating from Berklee College of Music in 2004, Stevens has established himself in the contemporary jazz scene performing and recording with numerous artists including Christian Scott, Terri Lyne Carrington, and Esperanza Spalding.

Regarded to be one of the "most exciting up-and-coming jazz guitarists" in his generation, Stevens was placed in the Rising Star Guitar Category of the 63rd Annual DownBeat Critics Poll. His performances have been esteemed by numerous publications including Down Beat, NPR, Jazz Times, Billboard, and The New York Times.

His debut album as a leader, Woodwork, received stellar reviews from critics including Down Beat, All About Jazz, and the Ottawa Citizen. LA Weekly describes the album as "an amalgamation of modern jazz and neo-fusion elements which showcase ... sonic versatility and savvy producing chops".

Stevens has toured extensively in the US, Canada, Europe, Asia, South Africa, and South America. He is also a member of the adjunct faculty at the New School and has taught workshops at the Maryland Summer Jazz Workshop, USC, and Berklee College of Music.

Stevens currently resides in New York City, New York.

== Awards and honors ==
- 2015: DownBeat magazine: The 63rd Annual DownBeat Critics Poll / Rising Star Guitar Category
- 2016: DownBeat magazine: “25 for the Future”

== Discography ==
=== As a leader ===
- Woodwork (Whirlwind), 2015)
- Preverbal (Ropeadope, 2017)
- Pittsburgh (Whirlwind), 2021)

=== As a sideman ===
Year	Artist	Album	Label
2006	Christian Scott	Rewind That	Concord
2007	Christian Scott	Anthem	Concord
2008	Christian Scott	Live at Newport	Concord
2009	Walter Smith III & Mark Small	Bronze	Fresh Sound
2010	Jacky Terrasson	Push	Concord
2010	Christian Scott	Yesterday You Said Tomorrow	Concord
2011	Ben Williams	State of Art	Concord
2011	Sean Jones	No Need for Words	Mack Avenue
2012	ERIMAJ	Conflict of a Man	Don't Cry
2012	Christian Scott aTunde Adjuah	Christian aTunde Adjuah	Concord
2013	NEXT Collective	Cover Art	Concord
2013	Chris Turner	Lovelife Is a Challenge	Love Child
2013	Chet Doxas	Dive	Addo
2013	Leron Thomas	Whatever	Independent
2014	Harvey Mason	Chameleon	Concord
2014	Walter Smith III	Still Casual	Independent
2015	Justin Kauflin	Dedication	Qwest
2015	Michael Oien	And Now	Fresh Sound
2015	Ben Williams	Coming of Age	Concord Jazz
2015	Christian Scott aTunde Adjuah	Stretch Music	Ropeadope
2016	Esperanza Spalding	Emily's D+Evolution	Concord
2017	Christian Scott aTunde Adjuah	The Emancipation Procrastination	Ropeadope
2017	Esperanza Spalding	Exposure	Concord
2017	Linda May Han Oh	Walk Against Wind	Biophilia Records
2018	Esperanza Spalding	12 Little Spells	Concord
2019	Terri Lyne Carrington & Social Science	The Waiting Game	Motéma
2021	Esperanza Spalding	Songwrights Apothecary Lab	Concord
2022	Terri Lyne Carrington	New Standards Vol 1	Candid
2023	Walter Smith III	Return to Casual	Blue Note
2024	Esperanza Spalding	Milton + esperanza	Concord
