= Yesterday You Said Tomorrow =

Studio album by Christian Scott
- Released: February 1, 2010 (UK), March 30, 2010 (US)
- Recorded: April 22–25, 2009
- Studio: Van Gelder Recording Studio, Inc., Englewood Cliffs, NJ
- Genre: Jazz
- Length: 67:30
- Label: Concord Music Group
- Producer: Chris Dunn and Christian Scott

Christian Scott chronology
Live at Newport (2008)	Yesterday You Said Tomorrow (2010)	Christian aTunde Adjuah (2012)

Professional ratings
Review scores
Source	Rating
Allmusic	4/5 stars
The Los Angeles Times	3/4 stars
Entertainment Weekly	A−
Jazzwise	4/5 stars
Tom Hull	B

Yesterday You Said Tomorrow is a studio album by American jazz trumpeter Christian Scott. Concord Music Group released the album on February 1, 2010, in the UK and on March 30, 2010, in the US.

== Background ==
As Scott says in the album's liner notes, this album "was designed in subject matter and sound to have the brevity and character of the recordings of the '60s," inspired by the likes of Miles Davis, John Coltrane, Jimi Hendrix and Bob Dylan. Yesterday You Said Tomorrow is a successful manifestation of the music concept that he calls "stretch music". The concept understands and respects the jazz traditions that came before and doesn't attempt to replace them, instead trying to embrace within its rhythmic and harmonic frameworks as many musical forms and cultural languages as possible. His later albums Christian aTunde Adjuah and Stretch Music will be thoughtful extensions of that model.

== Reception ==
Graham Reid of Elsewhere stated "Recorded, mixed and mastered by Blue Note legend Rudy Van Gelder, this album has the sonic presence of some of the classic Sixties albums and Scott is on record saying he was inspired by albums like Dylan's Blonde on Blonde as much as politically engaged material by Coltrane and others. Scott is one of the most interesting and innovative musicians of his post-Wynton generation and this excellent album should secure his place as a leader in jazz which is not only different, interesting and emotionally engaging but music with depth which invites political and social discussion. That makes him a very rare musician – jazz or otherwise – indeed."

Chris May of All About Jazz wrote "Trumpeter Christian Scott started raising expectations in 2006, with Rewind That (Concord), and hit the spot again in 2007 and 2008. Those earlier promises of greatness are clinched by Yesterday You Said Tomorrow. Scott's fourth Concord album is a gym-ripped amalgam of edgy jazz, hip hop and rock rhythms, off-kilter ostinatos, intimate rhapsodies and full-on passions, all welded together by the New Orleans-born player's alternately caressing and searing horn, and by his most tightly focused band to date."

== Track listing ==
All tracks are written by Christian Scott unless otherwise indicated.

1. K.K.P.D. (7:08)
2. The Eraser (5:30), written by Thom Yorke
3. After All (7:55), written by Matthew Stevens
4. Isadora (6:16)
5. Angola, LA & The 13th Amendment (8:40)
6. The Last Broken Heart (Prop 8) (5:49)
7. Jenacide (The Inevitable Rise and Fall of the Bloodless Revolution) (6:51)
8. The American't (7:09)
9. An Unending Repentance (9:42)
10. The Roe Effect (Refrain in F♯ Minor) (3:17), written with Matthew Stevens

== Personnel ==
- Christian Scott – trumpet
- Matthew Stevens – guitar
- Milton Fletcher Jr. – piano
- Kristopher Keith Funn – bass
- Jamire Williams – drums

== Chart performance ==
Chart (2010)	Peak position
US Jazz Albums (Billboard)	8
