= Prentice Powell =

American spoken word artist and poet

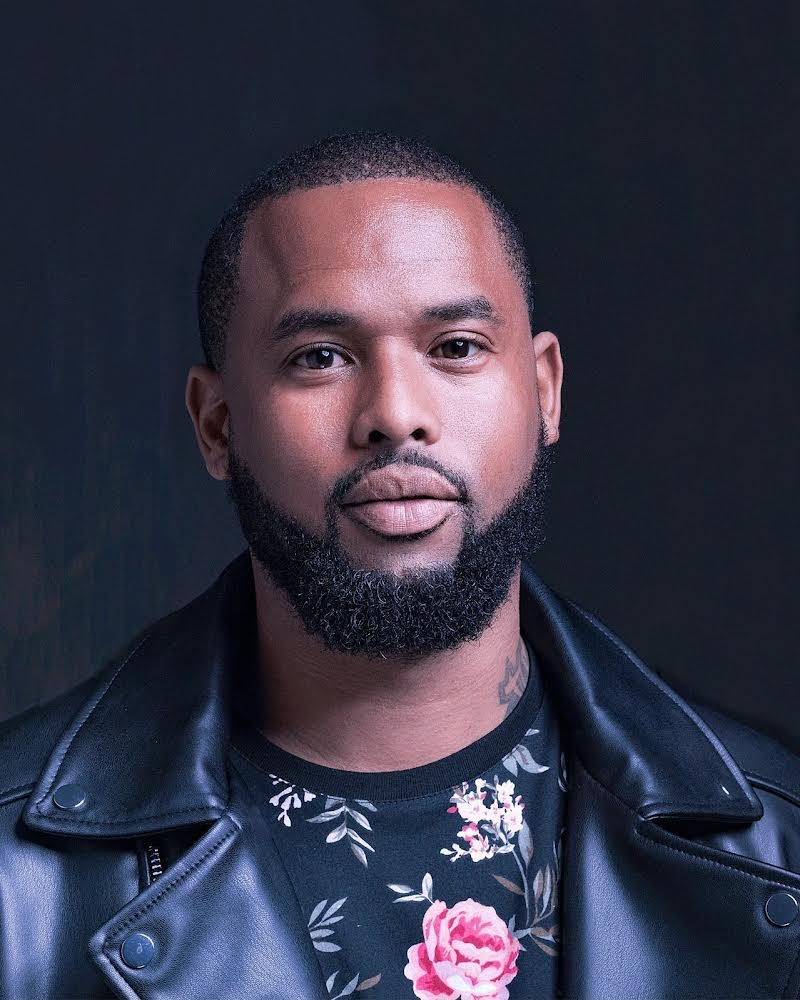
- Born: Prentice Powell; Oakland, California
- Occupations: Poet, writer
- Website: prenticepowell.com

Prentice Powell is an American spoken word poet, writer, and educator from Oakland, California. His work often explores themes of Black fatherhood, systemic injustice, and mental health. A National Poetry Slam finalist and Grand Slam Champion, he is known for his appearances on all six seasons of the television show Verses and Flow and was the first spoken word artist to perform on The Arsenio Hall Show. In 2024, his collaborative album with Shawn William, For Your Consideration '24, was nominated for Best Spoken Word Poetry Album at the 66th Annual Grammy Awards.

== Early life and influences ==
Powell was raised in Oakland, California, by his mother, a single parent who worked first as a police officer and later as a salon owner. This upbringing gave him a "robust sense of independence from an early age". A pivotal moment in his youth occurred after a rock-throwing incident led to an encounter with the juvenile justice system. Upon his release, his mother introduced him to Tommy Lindsey, the forensics speech and debate coach at James Logan High School. Lindsey became a key mentor, introducing Powell to theater and competitive speech, which Powell credits as the moment he "fell in love with words and the power of writing".

His introduction to spoken word poetry came from his cousin, Tyson Amir. Shortly after, his mother signed him up to perform at the Oakland Poetry Slam, launching his career in the local poetry community.

== Career ==
Prentice Powell composed and embarked on his first poem in 2003. In 2006, he became Oakland and San Francisco Grand Slam Champion. In 2007, Powell won Spoken-Word Artist of the Year at the Black Music Awards. In 2010, Powell was voted "Best Poet" by the Oakland East Bay Express. He has performed on stage with notable acts including Eric Roberson, Goapele, Amir Sulaiman, Stevie Wonder and more.

Powell was the first spoken-word artist to perform on The Arsenio Hall Show and is the only artist to have appeared on the program three times. He was the only poet to have appeared on all six seasons of TV One's Verses and Flow, with 11 episodes to his credit. In Season 5, he hosted the show's behind-the-scenes. He was the opening act for Grammy winner Jill Scott on her summer 2013 tour. On 5 February 2024, Powell attended the 66th Annual Grammy Awards event at Los Angeles.

== Career milestones and awards ==
Year	Achievement / Award	Notes and Sources
2003	National Poetry Slam Finalist	Placed in the top 15 individually, and his team placed 4th in the nation, within six months of writing his first poem.
2006	Oakland and San Francisco Grand Slam Champion	
2007	Spoken-Word Artist of the Year	Awarded at the Black Music Awards.
2010	"Best Poet"	Voted by the Oakland East Bay Express.
2013	NAACP Image Award Nominee (credited)	Powell is credited as a nominee in connection with his prominent role on the TV One series Verses and Flow, which was nominated for an Image Award that year.
2013	National Tour Opening Act	Opened for Jill Scott's summer tour with the poetry collective Fiveology.
2011-2015	Verses and Flow Appearances	The only poet to have appeared on all six seasons of the TV One series.
2013-2014	The Arsenio Hall Show Appearances	The first spoken word artist to perform on the show and the only artist to appear three times.
2024	Grammy Award Nominee	Nominated for Best Spoken Word Poetry Album for For Your Consideration '24.

== Advocacy and community work ==
In addition to his performance career, Powell is an educator and advocate. He has developed and taught creative writing courses with a focus on the youth development of African American boys and has also worked with autistic children with severe behavioral disorders.

Powell is the co-founder of the podcast and platform "All Black Men Need Therapy". The platform is described as a "critical space for Black men to explore and express their vulnerabilities and challenges without judgment" and aims to dismantle the stigma surrounding mental health in the Black community. He is also a member of Alpha Phi Alpha fraternity.

== Discography ==
Title	Album details	Notes
Public Service Announcement	Released: 2007; Label: N/A	Debut solo album.
For Your Consideration '24	Released: April 24, 2023; Label: Prentice Powell & Shawn William Records	Collaborative album with Shawn William.; Nominated for Best Spoken Word Poetry Album at the 66th Annual Grammy Awards.
PACK LIGHT	Released: August 26, 2025; Label: Digital University	
