= Aja Monet =

American contemporary poet and activist

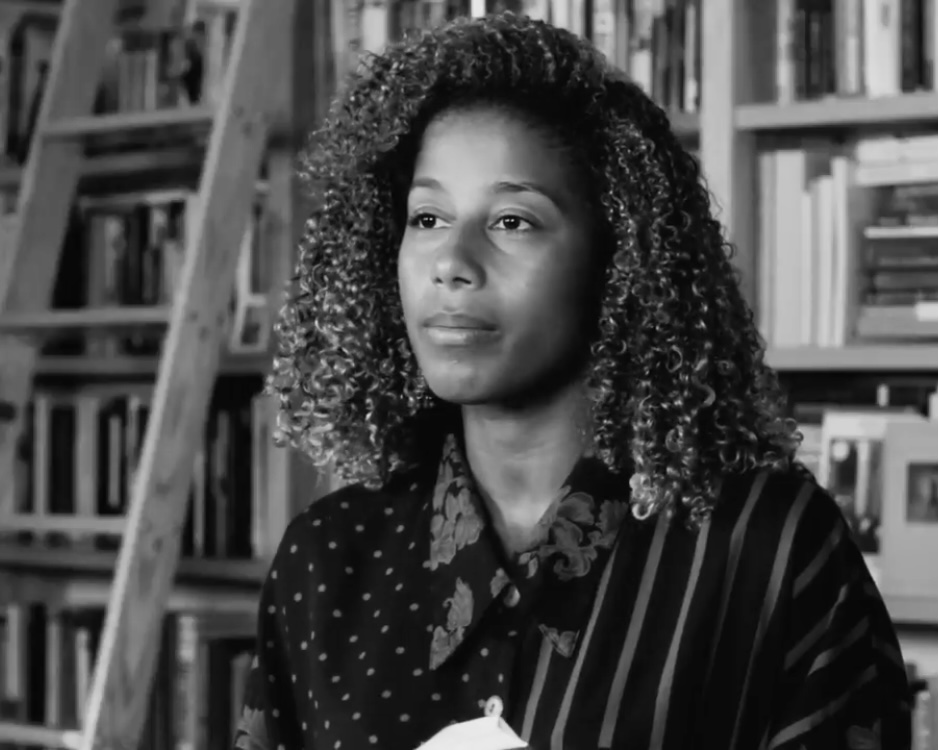
- Monet in 2017
- Born: Aja Monet Bacquie; August 21, 1987 (age 39); New York City, United States
- Occupations: Poet; writer; lyricist; activist
- Website: ajamonet.com

Aja Monet Bacquie (/ˈɑːʒə moʊˈneɪ/ AH-zhə moh-NAY; sometimes stylized in all lowercase) is an American contemporary poet, writer, lyricist and activist based in Los Angeles, California.

== Early life ==
Monet was raised in East New York, Brooklyn. She began writing poetry at age 8, due to her fascination with storytelling and typewriters. She started performing poetry in high school at Baruch College Campus High School in Manhattan. One of her first poetic memories was when she wrote a poem for a class that compelled the teacher, who encouraged Monet to continue writing. Monet competed with a poem for her high school talent show, and won, bringing her teachers to tears. She created the club SABA, Students Acknowledging Black Achievements, and got involved with the organization, Urban Word NYC, who taught Monet that poetry could be a career. She was invited by Mahogany L. Browne to a poetry workshop at a group home for pregnant teens in Inwood, which exposed her to how poetry could be used for community empowerment. When she was 17, she attended Brave New Voices, Youth Speaks' national poetry competition, which politicized her by showing her what issues teens were facing around the country. Her longtime collaborator, Saul Williams, has known Monet since she was 14.

Monet was in class at BCC High School when the 9/11 attacks occurred.

Monet has stated that she was more afraid of the police growing up than any other people in her community. According to the Village Voice, "Growing up in Brooklyn, Monet witnessed first-hand the mounting tensions between the police and the Black community in New York City. She remembers the pain she felt watching the heads of young Black boys being lowered into the backs of police cars, the anger that rose up when officers would "taunt" her uncle and brother during their patrols through her neighborhood."

== Career ==
Monet was the youngest poet to ever hold the title of Nuyorican Poets Café Grand Slam Champion at the age of 19 in 2007, and is the last woman to have won this title since.

She earned a Bachelor of Arts from Sarah Lawrence College and MFA in writing from Art Institute of Chicago.

=== Written work ===
Not far from her graduation, she published two E-books, Black Unicorn Sings (2010) and Inner-City Chants and Cyborg Ciphers (2014). She also did co-editing and arrangements of the spoken word Chorus: A Literary Mixtape (2012).

Monet was nominated for an NAACP Image Award for Outstanding Literary Work – Poetry for her collection My Mother Was a Freedom Fighter. A starred review in Publishers Weekly praised Monet's "stunning and evocative language" as she "strikingly illustrates the passage from girlhood to womanhood".

She is a contributor to the 2019 anthology New Daughters of Africa, edited by Margaret Busby, with poems "about love and intimacy as a primary aspect of freedom fighting".

=== Community work ===
In 2015, Monet spoke at a vigil for the #SayHerName movement, which was assembled by New York's African American Policy Forum to raise awareness about women victims of police brutality, and their erasure.

In 2015, Monet moved from Brooklyn to Miami to build a social justice arts community.

In 2020, Monet supported Bernie Sanders's 2020 campaign for president.

=== Collaborations with musicians ===
In 2019, Monet collaborated with Eryn Allen Kane for Kane's album, a tree planted by water.

In 2021, with Smoke Signals Collective, Monet released "The FREE Tape, a hip-hop-forward, self-described "soundtrack for liberation" made in conjunction with the group's many singers, poets and multi-instrumentalists."

In 2023, Monet released her debut album, when the poems do what they do, featuring Chief Xian aTunde Adjuah, Samora Pinderhughes, Marcus Gilmore, Lonnie Holley, Eryn Allen Kane, and Novena Carmel. The album received a four star rating from Jazzwise, which wrote, "Monet's spoken word poems variously thrill, challenge seduce and bring joy". The New York Times called the project, "a nuanced exploration of Blackness." Pitchfork granted the LP a 7.4 rating and wrote that the record expands on Monet's previous works, "taking us through storm-battered homes and jump rope competitions as she explores Black joy and the blight of capitalism." when the poems do what they do was later nominated for a 2024 GRAMMY Award for Best Spoken Word Poetry Album.

Monet is featured in Harry Belafonte's 2023 documentary, Following Harry.

== Work in Miami ==
=== Smoke Signals Studio ===
Monet previously lived in Little Haiti, Miami. Monet has said she connected to Florida's "indigenous African roots" and "climate gentrification" issues. In 2016, she co-founded Smoke Signals Studio in Miami—an arts collective dedicated to music, art, and community organizing. The studio runs on a barter system. Monet explains, "For every hour that someone spends in the this studio to record to make music, we hope for them to give an equal amount of time doing radical, political education or giving a training or workshop to other folks with the same skill set that they can provide. Let's say you're a really good guitar player, and you're here for an hour to use the studio. You could give an hour of guitar lessons to the community or to our young people."

=== VOICES: Poetry for the People ===
Monet coordinates the poetry workshop VOICES: Poetry for the People and organized its first annual Maroon Poetry Festival in the Liberty City section of Miami.

In 2019, she facilitated Where the Land Is Free, a project showcased by VOICES: Poetry for the People, on view at Wynwood's Bakehouse Art Complex. The exhibit featured Meet Your Neighbors, a piece by Calvin Early, which was composed of photographs of longtime Black and brown Wynwood residents. Where the Land Is Free was created in collaboration with Community Justice Project, "a group of movement lawyers that provides legal support to organizers and grassroots groups to strengthen their ability to fundamentally change the conditions of their oppression".

In 2016, according to Monet, residents of Little Farm Mobile Home neighborhood were being displaced from their homes by developers. She stated, "Community Justice Project worked hard to represent marginalized folks. They were working with Spanish and Creole-speaking people who didn't know how to fight back." CJP utilized Monet to lead poetry workshops with neighborhood residents so they could be empowered in the fight against predatory developers and gentrification. Together, they wrote and performed poetry and studied the Black Arts Movement, the Chicano Movement, the American Indian Movement. This project evolved into VOICES: Poetry for the People, Where the Land Is Free, and the Maroon Poetry Festival.

In 2019, VOICES partnered with Exchange for Change, a nonprofit that offers classes on a variety of topics at several Florida prisons, to hold poetry workshops for incarcerated writers.

== Work in Palestine ==
=== Flashmob in Nazareth ===
In 2015, Monet joined a flashmob in Nazareth organized by the Dream Defenders delegation to Palestine. The protest was facilitated by Patrisse Cullors who co-founded #BlackLivesMatter. During the gathering, Monet speaks, "We sit in a sea of settlements / While the sound of suffering / Sails lost in the listening / As the voices of heartache hail / The power of presence / People as portals / Passports to heaven / Here is a protest in the form of a prayer." The flashmob video's caption explains, "a historic trip to Palestine, freedom fighters from Los Angeles, Miami, Chicago, New York, Ferguson, and Atlanta were able to witness firsthand the effects of Israeli apartheid and occupation, and to learn from the people who are actively resisting on the front lines. In Nazareth, the delegates decided to do a solidarity demonstration as a call for support of the Boycott, Divestment, and Sanctions (BDS) campaign that was called for by Palestinian civil society in 2005." Together, the group danced the dabke, sang Sweet Honey in the Rock's "Ella's Song", and chanted "I believe that we will win!". The action was filmed and edited by Thorstein Thielow. The action occurred only months after the Ferguson uprising.

=== Commentary on Palestine ===
In 2017, Monet read "Apologies to All the People in Lebanon" by June Jordan, dedicated to the 600,000 Palestinian men, children, and women who lived in Lebanon from 1948 to 1983, on the Laura Flanders Show. About the piece, Monet stated, "Jordan begs us to trust one another and to tell the truth, to read the world more closely, to learn the wisdom of those who came before, who resisted before, and loved before."

On September 18, 2017, Monet spoke at Verso Books on Adalah-NY's and Jewish Voice for Peace's Free (Speech) Palestine panel. Monet spoke about common tone-policing and judgement towards the Palestinian people for their tactics of resisting oppression. She said, "We met with some Palestinian activists in Ramallah but one of the things the sister said was, '…if at some point, you, the person watching and witnessing, does not help the person who has the foot on their on their neck, get the foot off their neck, you have no right to talk about how they ought to resist the foot on their neck.'"

In 2020, Monet hosted a poetry reading through Haymarket Books, dedicated to her Palestinian comrades on Nakba Day, the day that marked the displacement of Palestinians and the declaration of the state of Israel. The reading featured Shadia Mansour, Remi Kanazi, Tahani Salah, Amir Sulaiman, Tef Poe, Frank Waln, Dareen Tatour, Hala Alyan, Tariq Luthun, Ahmad Abuznaid, and Mohammed El Kurd.

In 2021, she spoke on theGrio about Black-Palestinian solidarity with organizer and academic, Marc Lamont Hill and human rights attorney, Noura Erakat. In 2023 she signed the open letter Artists Against Apartheid.

She wrote the foreword for Mohammed El-Kurd's debut collection of poetry, Rifqa, written in the tradition of Ghassan Kanfani's Palestinian Resistance Literature.

In October 2023, Monet signed an open letter to US president Joe Biden of artists calling for a ceasefire of the Israeli bombardment of Gaza. In 2025, she joined the No Music for Genocide movement, geo-blocking her music from streaming in Israel, in response to "Israel's genocide in Gaza; occupation and ethnic cleansing of the West Bank".

== Bibliography ==
=== Books ===
- Amoako Boafo, 2022
- My Mother Was a Freedom Fighter, Haymarket Books, 2017
- The Black Unicorn Sings, Penmanship Books, 2010
- Chorus: A Literary Mixtape, MTV Books, 2012

=== Poems ===
- "For The Kids Who Live", Just Jazz Live Concert Series, 2021
- "Black Joy", Community Church of Sebastopol, 2020
- "Say Her Name", Summit, 2018
- "Give My Regards to Brooklyn", Summit, 2018
- "Dark Matter", The Laura Flanders Show, 2017
- "My Mother Was a Freedom Fighter", Women's March, 2017
- "You Make Holy War", Madame Noir, 2016
- "Weathering", College Unions Poetry Slam Invitational, 2015
- "The First Time", College Unions Poetry Slam Invitational, 2015
- "What I've Learned", The Nuyorican Poets Cafe, 2012
- "Truth or Dare", The Nuyorican Poets Cafe, 2008

== Discography ==
=== Albums ===
- When the Poems Do What They Do (drink sum wtr, 2023-06-09)
- the color of rain (drink sum wtr, 2026)

=== Singles ===
- "Give My Regards to Brooklyn" (drink sum wtr, 2022-06-29)
- "The Devil You Know" (drink sum wtr, 2023-02-22)
- "For Sonia" (drink sum wtr, 2023-04-19)
