= Anthem (Christian Scott album) =

Studio album by Christian Scott
- Released: August 28, 2007 (US); January 21, 2008 (UK)
- Recorded: January 26–30, 2007
- Studios: Fantasy, Berkeley, CA
- Genre: Jazz
- Length: 65:14
- Label: Concord
- Producers: Chris Dunn, Christian Scott

Christian Scott chronology
Rewind That (2006)	Anthem (2007)	Live at Newport (2008)

Anthem is a studio album by American jazz trumpeter Christian Scott released on August 28, 2007, via Concord Records.

== Background ==
Anthem is a Scott's emotional response to the continued suffering in 2007 of his fellow New Orleanians two years after Hurricane Katrina.

== Reception ==
Professional ratings
Review scores
Source	Rating
All About Jazz	4/5 stars
AllMusic	3.5/5 stars
The Guardian	3/5 stars
laut.de	5/5 stars
PopMatters	6/10

Steve Greenlee of JazzTimes stated "There's a reason the term "sophomore slump" exists, and trumpeter Christian Scott has hit it. There were high expectations surrounding him, though; his first disc, Rewind That, was an auspicious modern-jazz debut and one of the most enjoyable listens of 2006. His second album, Anthem? Not so much. OK, maybe that's being generous to a young man with a lot of promise. His new album is actually dreadful. It's dark and brooding, and while it was informed and inspired by Hurricane Katrina and government's failure to help the people of Scott's hometown, that's no excuse for the plodding dullness and striking lack of imagination that pervade Anthem".

Will Layman of PopMatters noted "Anthem is dark-toned. This is no surprise, given that it was written and performed in the wake of Hurricane Katrina and the failure of the government to sufficiently rescue Scott's hometown. The textures are big: fat rock drums, crunching guitars, spacious piano sound, and a Miles Davis-tinged middle register trumpet that crackles with jazz but seems equally likely to brood like a good indie-rocker should. There are passages that play like jazz ("Remains District" and "Katrina Eyes", both minor melodies given a snap of backbeat) and others that jump with a groove ("Re:"). There is also a final reprise of the title track that is given a spoken word overlay that brings home the music's political themes on a hip-hop tip. Much of the music is despairing, and understandably so".

Paul Sullivan of BBC wrote "Written in the wake of Hurricane Katrina in New Orleans – Scott's former hometown – Anthem is a dark, sometimes despairing document that meditates on the disaster as well as charting changes in the musician's burgeoning career and personal life. The beguiling mix of despondency and hope that ooze from opening track Litany Against Fear – think ringing electric guitars, sprawling post-rock rhythms and pounding piano creating an apocalyptic soundscape over which Scott writes plaintive messages in the air – act as a signpost for the rest of the album".

== Track listing ==
All tracks are written by Christian Scott unless otherwise indicated.

1. Litany Against Fear (5:51)
2. Void (5:00)
3. Anthem (Antediluvian Adaptation) (7:25)
4. RE: (2:14)
5. Cease Fire (5:48)
6. Dialect (4:40)
7. Remains Distant (5:29)
8. The Uprising (5:42), written by Aaron Parks
9. Katrina's Eyes (6:37)
10. The 9 (4:51), written with Louis Fouche
11. Like That (6:41)
12. Anthem (Post Diluvial Adaptation) – Feat. Brother J of X Clan (4:56), written with Jason Hunter

== Personnel ==
- Christian Scott – trumpet, cornet, flugelhorn, piano on track 4
- Matthew Stevens – guitar
- Aaron Parks – piano, Fender rhodes, synth bass on track 5, synth on tracks 6 and 8
- Walter Smith III – tenor saxophone
- Louis Fouche – alto saxophone
- Luques Curtis – bass on all tracks except 1, 4, and 5
- Esperanza Spalding – bass on tracks 1 and 4
- Marcus Gilmore – drums
- Brother J – vocals on track 12

== Chart performance ==
Chart (2007)	Peak position
US Jazz Albums (Billboard)	26
