= Christian aTunde Adjuah =

Studio album by Christian Scott
- Released: 25 June 2012 (UK), 31 July 2012 (US)
- Recorded: July 20–22, 25–27, 2011
- Studio: Sear Sound, New York City
- Genre: Jazz
- Length: 119:06
- Label: Concord Music Group
- Producer: Chris Dunn and Christian aTunde Adjuah

Christian Scott chronology
Ninety Miles (2011)	Christian aTunde Adjuah (2012)	Ninety Miles Live at Cubadisco (2012)

Professional ratings
Aggregate scores
Source	Rating
Metacritic	75/100
Review scores
Source	Rating
All About Jazz	5/5 stars
Allmusic	4/5 stars
The Guardian	4/5 stars
The Irish Times	4/5 stars
Jazzwise	4/5 stars
laut.de	4/5 stars
The List	4/5 stars
Mojo	4/5 stars
PopMatters	6/10
Tom Hull	B+

Christian aTunde Adjuah is a two-disc studio album by American jazz trumpeter Christian Scott released on 31 July 2012 by Concord Records.

== Background ==
Scott's 2010 album Yesterday You Said Tomorrow was a successful manifestation of the music concept that he calls "stretch music". The concept understands and respects the jazz traditions that came before and doesn't attempt to replace them, instead trying to embrace within its rhythmic and harmonic frameworks as many musical forms and cultural languages as possible. Christian aTunde Adjuah and later Stretch Music are thoughtful extensions of that trend.

== Reception ==
At Metacritic, that assigns a normalized rating out of 100 to reviews from mainstream critics, the album received an average score of 75, based on six reviews, which indicates "generally favorable reviews".

John Fordham of The Guardian wrote, "The double album Christian aTunde Adjuah broadens the themes further: to his family's African ancestry, contemporary inequality and racism, globalisation and war. It isn't a lecture, but a courageous and ambitious experiment. The proclamatory purity of Scott's trumpet sound could carry much of the set's message on its own, but guitarist Matthew Stevens' raw chords and churning vamps make effective contrasts with the leader's double-time passages." Chris May of All About Jazz noted, "Extra-musically, too, aTunde Adjuah is a manifesto for change. Scroll down the track listing: the titles reference issues such as the rape of 400 African women in the Sudanese town of Rokero by Janjaweed militiamen ("Fatima Aisha Rokero 400"), the killing of an innocent black teenager in Florida earlier this year ("Trayvon"), the demonization of the homeless in the US ("Vs. The Kleptocratic Union: Mrs McDowell's Crime"), the trafficking of women for the sex trade ("Away: Anuradha And The Maiti Nepal"), conflict in the Middle East ("Jihad Joe"), the legacy of slavery in the US ("Dred Scott"), police killings of innocent people in New Orleans in the wake of hurricane Katrina ("Danziger"), and HIV/AIDS ("The Berlin Patient: CCR5")... Scott's music is instrumental rather than vocal, so he addresses these issues not with words, but with attitude and vibe; track titles and liner notes are the only words you get. His message is no less coherent for that, and, while it may not have the narrative literalism of "conscious" rap music, it has the same relevance, accessibility and immediacy."

David Amidon of PopMatters noted, "Mostly, Christian aTunde Adjuah continues to emphasize Scott's apparent interest in the qualities of post-rock performers like Mogwai and Do Make Say Think. While his trumpet no doubt plays lead throughout the album, it's often hard to avoid getting the impression this time around that Matthew Stevens has earned equal sway within the band. Many of the tracks' most dominant melodies are his, with Scott's trumpet taking control by sheer volume as much as tonal impact. He is still by the far the most agreeable thing about this record, the reason you'd want to keep coming back for more, but this two disc set does feature plenty of songs that feel like a rock band playing host to a trumpet soloist rather than the other way around. This is where Scott's description of his compositional style - termed "stretch" or "forecasting cell" in his liners - comes into play. "Stretch jazz" essentially feels like an easy way to avoid saying "post rock + math rock + jazz", but his explanation for "forecasting cells" has more science to it."

== Track listing ==
All tracks are written by Christian Scott unless otherwise indicated.

=== Disc 1 ===
1. Fatima Aisha Rokero 400 (5:41)
2. New New Orleans (King Adjuah Stomp) (5:01)
3. Kruo Shinobi (Interlude) (2:25), written by Lawrence Fields and Jamire Williams
4. Who They Wish I Was (5:42), written with Kristopher Keith Funn
5. Pyrrhic Victory of aTunde Adjuah (5:17)
6. Spy Boy / Flag Boy (4:45)
7. Vs. The Kleptocratic Union (Ms. McDowell's Crime) (6:00)
8. Kiel (6:14)
9. Of Fire (Les Filles de la Nouvelle Orleans) (4:15)
10. Dred Scott (4:29)
11. Danziger (10:38)

=== Disc 2 ===
1. The Berlin Patient (CCR5) (3:50)
2. Jihad Joe (5:56)
3. Van Gogh (Interlude) (1:35), written with Lawrence Fields
4. Liar Liar (5:41)
5. I Do (4:03)
6. Alkebu Lan (5:33)
7. Bartlett (7:01), written by Matthew Stevens
8. When Marissa Stands Her Ground (6:24)
9. Cumulonimbus (Interlude) (2:26), written by Lawrence Fields
10. Away (Anuradha & The Maiti Nepal) (7:03)
11. The Red Rooster (3:37), written by Kristopher Keith Funn
12. Cara (5:30)

== Personnel ==
- Christian Scott – trumpet, siren, sirenette, reverse flugel
- Matthew Stevens – guitars
- Lawrence Fields – piano, Fender Rhodes, harpsichord
- Kristopher Keith Funn – bass
- Jamire Williams – drums
- Kenneth Whalum III – tenor saxophone on "I Do"
- Corey King – trombone on "Of Fire (Les Filles de la Nouvelle Orleans", "Liar Liar", "When Marissa Stands Her Ground", and "Away"
- Louis Fouche – alto saxophone on "Of Fire (Les Filles de la Nouvelle Orleans" and "When Marissa Stands Her Ground"

== Chart performance ==
Chart (2012)	Peak position
US Jazz Albums (Billboard)	2
