= When the Poems Do What They Do =

Studio album by Aja Monet
- Released: June 9, 2023
- Studio: Westlake Recording Studio, Los Angeles, California, United States
- Genre: Jazz; poetry; spoken word
- Length: 83:15
- Language: English
- Label: drink sum wtr
- Producer: Chief Xian aTunde Adjuah; Molly Hawkins; Aja Monet; Zach Tetreault

When the Poems Do What They Do is the debut studio album by American poet Aja Monet, released by drink sum wtr on June 9, 2023. The album has received positive reviews from critics.

== Reception ==
In Exclaim!, Tom Beedham called this album "a roadmap to somewhere greater" and states that the work has "emotional import [and] mechanical industry". At Okayplayer, Nereya Otieno compares this release to a weighted blanket and praises the storytelling of the songs as well as the musicianship. Marcus J. Moore of The New York Times compares this release to the spoken word scene of the 1990s and characterizes it as "a nuanced exploration of Blackness". NPR's Sheldon Pearce considers this a "wondrous debut album" that is "gorgeously meditative and potently groovy". Writing for Pitchfork, Mary Retta scored this album a 7.4 out of 10 for having "a profound and forceful clarity" and that the backing of veteran jazz musicians adds to the "gravitas and wonder" of Monet's poetry.

Staff at KCRW listed this the 17th best album of 2023. Graham Reid of The New Zealand Herald included this in his favorite albums of 2023.

== Track listing ==
All songs written by Chief Xian aTunde Adjuah, Weedie Braimah, Luques Curtis, Marcus Gilmore, Aja Monet, Elena Pinderhughes, and Samora Pinderhughes.

1. "i am" – 3:48
2. "why my love?" – 4:37
3. "black joy" – 6:17
4. "unhurt" – 6:36
5. "weathering" – 5:42
6. "the perfect storm" – 8:03
7. "the devil you know" – 9:59
8. "what makes you feel loved?" – 2:31
9. "for sonia" – 7:05
10. "yemaya" – 12:39
11. "castaway" – 4:34
12. "give thanks" – 6:29
13. "for the kids who live" – 4:56

== Personnel ==
- Aja Monet – vocals, production, executive production
- Chief Xian aTunde Adjuah – bow, trumpet, production
- Paul Blakemore – mastering
- Weedie Braimah – percussion (including djembe)
- Luques Curtis – bass guitar
- Def Sound – assistant production
- Delphine Diallo – cover photography
- Marcus Gilmore – drums
- Rob Lewis – vinyl design
- Brodie Means – assistant engineering
- Elena Pinderhughes – flute
- Samora Pinderhughes – piano
- Dave Weingarten – engineering, mixing

== See also ==
- List of 2023 albums
