= Live at Newport (Christian Scott album) =

Live album by Christian Scott
- Released: 4 November 2008 (US), 10 November 2008 (UK)
- Recorded: 9 August 2008
- Venues: JVC Jazz Festival, Newport
- Genre: Jazz
- Length: 73:39 (CD), approx. 108 minutes (DVD)
- Label: Concord Music Group
- Producers: Chris Dunn and Christian Scott

Christian Scott chronology
Anthem (2007)	Live at Newport (2008)	Yesterday You Said Tomorrow (2010)

Professional ratings
Review scores
Source	Rating
AllMusic	3.5/5 stars
All About Jazz	4.5/5 stars
Toronto Star	3/4 stars
Tom Hull	B

Live at Newport is a live album by American jazz trumpeter Christian Scott released in 2008 via Concord Records label.

== Reception ==
Josef Woodard of JazzTimes noted "From one perspective, it might seem a bit premature for young trumpeter Christian Scott to be releasing a live album, with only two major label studio albums out since his emergence on the scene in 2006. On the plus side, Live at Newport, with material drawn from his earlier albums mixed in with new tunes, offers up a glimpse at Scott's intriguing and evolving band in the more open and in-the-moment setting of a live show, and captured at a historic festival, no less... As a trumpeter, Scott demonstrates an appreciation for musical finery. Though a strong player, he heeds a romantic impulse and resists excessive technical overkill. He savors long, nuanced tones, loops fragmented phrases and generally seeks to hone a voice to call his own in the crowded ranks of good trumpeters on the scene. So far, so good, whatever his place in the genre game."

S. Victor Aaron of Something Else Reviews wrote "It's hard to escape the comparison of this date to Miles Davis’ historic performance at this same Newport festival exactly fifty years prior. Although Scott's music and even his trumpet playing are (ahem) miles apart, I gather that as Davis did back then, Scott and his band are turning heads with his Newport appearance, too. New Orleans was always known for raising forward-thinking jazz musicians. Christian Scott offers proof that this proud tradition is alive and well."

== Track listing ==
All tracks are written by Christian Scott unless otherwise indicated. The album includes elements of "Straight, No Chaser", written by Thelonious Monk.

=== CD ===
1. Died in Love (6:56)
2. Litany Against Fear (11:26)
3. Isadora (5:09)
4. Rumor (14:00), written by Matthew Stevens
5. Anthem (9:13)
6. The Crawler (6:50), written by Matthew Stevens
7. James Crow Jr., Esq. (10:58), written with Louis Fouche
8. Rewind That (9:07)

=== DVD ===
1. Died in Love
2. Litany Against Fear
3. Isadora
4. Rumor
5. Anthem
6. James Crow Jr., Esq.
7. Rewind That

All access documentary "The Newport Experience".

== Personnel ==
- Christian Scott – trumpet
- Walter Smith III – tenor saxophone (CD tracks 2, 4, 5–8)
- Matthew Stevens – guitar
- Aaron Parks – piano
- Joe Sanders – bass
- Jamire Williams – drums

== Chart performance ==
Chart (2008)	Peak position
US Jazz Albums (Billboard)	41
