= Stefon Harris =

American jazz musician (born 1973)

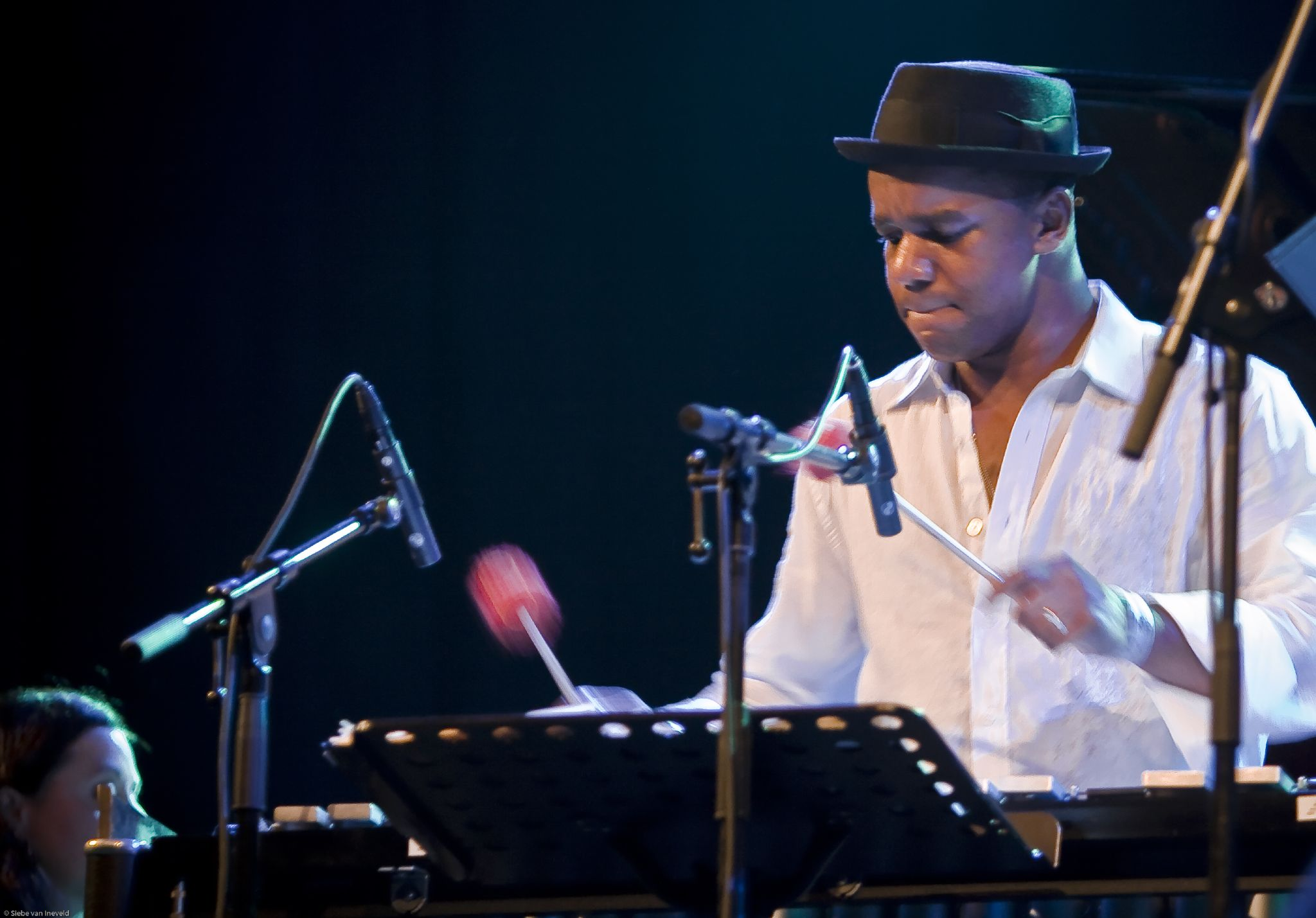
- Harris at the North Sea Jazz Festival 2007

Background information
- Born: Stefon DeLeon Harris; March 23, 1973 (age 53); Albany, New York, U.S.
- Genres: Jazz; classical
- Occupation: Musician
- Instruments: Vibraphone; marimba
- Years active: 1996–present
- Label: Blue Note
- Website: stefonharris.com

Stefon DeLeon Harris (born March 23, 1973) is an American jazz vibraphonist.

== Biography ==
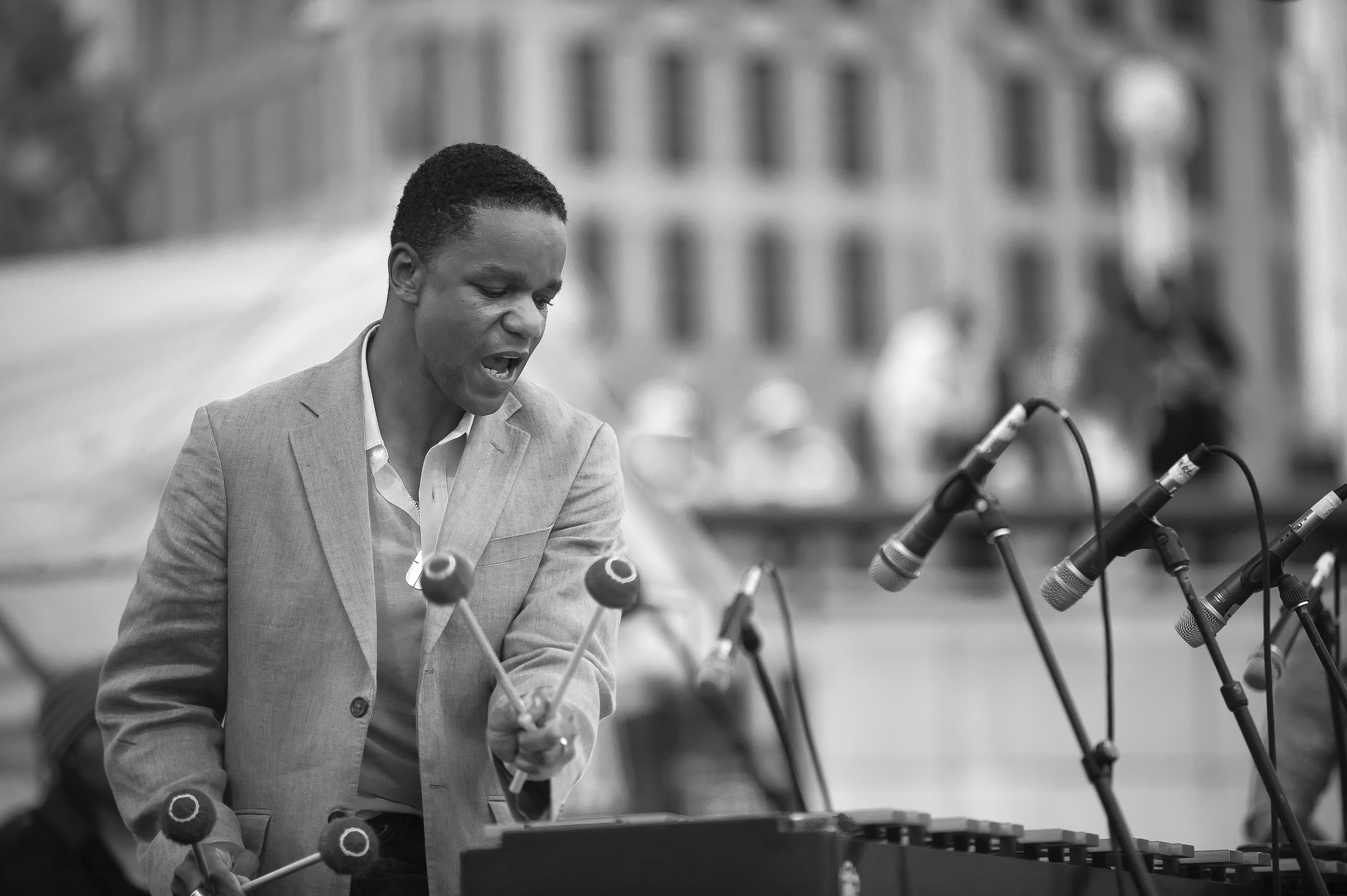
Stefon Harris at the 30th Detroit International Jazz Festival

A native of Albany, New York, Harris intended to work for the New York Philharmonic until he heard the music of Charlie Parker. During the 1990s he recorded with Charlie Hunter and Steve Turre as a session musician. He signed with Blue Note, which released his debut album, A Cloud of Red Dust (1998). His second album, Black Action Figure, was nominated for a Grammy Award. In 2001 he worked with pianist Jacky Terrasson at the Village Vanguard in New York City and recorded the album Kindred with him during the same year. His album The Grand Unification Theory (2003) won the Martin E. Segal Award from Jazz at Lincoln Center.

In April 2009, he headlined at the Orange County Performing Arts Center in Orange County, California.

Harris collaborated with saxophonist David Sánchez and trumpeter Christian Scott in 2011 on the album Ninety Miles. They recorded the album in Havana, Cuba.

== Discography ==
=== As leader/co-leader ===
- A Cloud of Red Dust (Blue Note, 1998)
- Black Action Figure (Blue Note, 1999)
- Kindred with Jacky Terrasson (Blue Note, 2001)
- The Grand Unification Theory (Blue Note, 2003)
- Evolution (Blue Note, 2004)
- African Tarantella: Dances With Duke (Blue Note, 2006)
- Urbanus (Concord, 2009)
- Ninety Miles with David Sánchez and Christian Scott (Concord Picante, 2011)
- Ninety Miles Live at Cubadisco with David Sánchez and Christian Scott (Concord Picante, 2012)
- Sonic Creed (Motema, 2018)

=== As a member ===
New Directions
With Greg Osby, Mark Shim, Jason Moran, Tarus Mateen, Nasheet Waits

- Blue Note New Directions (Blue Note/Somethin' Else, 1999)

The Classical Jazz Quartet

- Tchaikovsky's Nutcracker (Vertical Jazz, 2001)
- The Classical Jazz Quartet Plays Bach (Vertical Jazz, 2002)
- The Classical Jazz Quartet Play Rachmaninov (Kind of Blue, 2006)
- The Classical Jazz Quartet Play Tchaikovsky (Kind of Blue, 2006)
- Christmas (Kind of Blue, 2006)

The SFJAZZ Collective

- Live 2008: 5th Annual Concert Tour - The Works of Wayne Shorter (SFJAZZ, 2008)[3CD]
- Live 2010: 7th Annual Concert Tour - The Works of Horace Silver (SFJAZZ, 2010)[3CD]
- Live in New York 2011 - Season 8 - The Music of Stevie Wonder (SFJAZZ, 2011)
- Wonder - The Songs of Stevie Wonder (SFJAZZ, 2012)
- Live: SFJAZZ Center 2013 - The Music of Chick Corea (SFJAZZ, 2013
- Miguel Zenón Retrospective: Original Compositions, 2004-2016 (SF Jazz Collective, 2018)

=== As sideman ===
With Diana Krall

- Christmas Songs (Verve, 2005)
- Turn Up the Quiet (Verve, 2017) – rec.2016

With others

- Tim Warfield, Jazz Is, A Whisper in the Midnight (Criss Cross, 1995)
- Atsushi Ikeda, Everybody's Music (King, 1995)
- Terell Stafford, Centripetal Force (Candid, 1996)
- Joe Henderson, Porgy & Bess (Verve, 1997)
- Charlie Hunter, Return of the Candyman (Blue Note, 1998)
- Jason Moran, Soundtrack to Human Motion (Blue Note, 1999)
- Jacky Terrasson, A Paris... (Blue Note, 2000)
- Kurt Elling, Man in the Air (Blue Note, 2003)
- Kenny Barron, Images (Sunnyside, 2004)
- Buster Williams, Griot Libertè (HighNote, 2004)
- Janis Siegel, Sketches of Broadway (Telarc, 2004)
- Lea DeLaria, Double Standards (Telarc, 2005)
- Raul Midón, State of Mind (Manhattan, 2005)
- Greg Osby, The Inner Circle (Blue Note, 2002) – rec.1999
- Joshua Redman, Momentum (Nonesuch, 2006)
- Steve Turre, Keep Searchin' (HighNote, 2006)
- Ry Cooder, My Name Is Buddy (Nonesuch, 2007)
- Courtney Pine, Transition in Tradition (Destin-E, 2009)
- Christian Sands, Christmas Stories (Mack Avenue, 2023)
