= Ninety Miles Live at Cubadisco =

Live album by Christian Scott
- Released: September 24, 2012
- Recorded: May 18, 2010
- Venue: Teatro Amadeo Roldan, Havana, Cuba
- Genre: Jazz
- Length: 59:53
- Label: Concord Picante CPI-34173ADV
- Producer: Chris Dunn

Christian Scott chronology
Christian aTunde Adjuah (2012)	Ninety Miles Live at Cubadisco (2012)	Stretch Music (2015)

Ninety Miles Live at Cubadisco is a live album by Stefon Harris, David Sanchez, and Christian Scott. The record is the follow-up to the project Ninety Miles (2011), a video documentary accompanied by a studio-recorded CD which focused on the jazz and popular music traditions of New Orleans and New York and the musical and cultural connections with Cuba and the rest of the Caribbean. The name alludes to that stretch of waters between America, Puerto Rico, and Cuba. The album was recorded on May 18, 2010 at Cubadisco, one of the biggest music festivals in Cuba, at Teatro Amadeo Roldán in Havana, and released on September 24, 2012 via Concord Picante label.

== Reception ==
Michael J. West of JazzTimes stated "Ninety Miles, the Afro-Cuban recording by vibraphonist Stefon Harris, saxophonist David Sánchez and trumpeter Christian Scott, was among 2011’s best releases; Cubadisco, its new live follow-up, includes six of the nine compositions performed on the studio album. Head-to-head comparison is inevitable, and Cubadisco wins. It’s among 2012’s best... The record’s best moment, though, belongs to Harris. After call-and-response between Sánchez and Scott on “City Sunrise” has exploded into minor-key counterpoint, ratcheting up the tension unbearably, the vibraphonist follows with a slow, sweet major-key release, an emotional moment heightened by Harris’ high, wordless singing along with his solo. It’s a moment of spontaneous beauty that the studio album can’t touch. All of that record’s pathos, tension and craft are present on Cubadisco, with an added boost of energy."

Lew Whittington of Huffington Post noted "This recording captures the dimensional quality of this live performance, so tightly engineered on site and well-mixed at Village Studios L.A. Harris, Sanchez, Scott and the other members of the band are in top form, and it’s easy to hear that these players are in the moment with this audience, great that this single evening is now preserved. In the meantime, let’s hope they get together again and tour this.

== Track listing ==
No.	Title	Writer(s)	Length
1.	"And This Too Shall Pass"	Harris	12:30
2.	"Brown Bell Blues"	Harris	5:25
3.	"City Sunrise"	Sánchez	12:38
4.	"The Forgotten Ones"	Sánchez	5:05
5.	"Congo"	Rember Duharte	6:14
6.	"Paradise Found"		7:34
7.	"La Fiesta Va"	Harold López-Nussa	10:27
Total length:			59:53
