= Ancestral Recall (album) =

Studio album by Christian Scott
- Released: March 22, 2019
- Recorded: April–December, 2018
- Studios: The Champagne Room West and The Parlor, New Orleans, LA
- Genre: Jazz
- Length: 1:01:28
- Label: Ropeadope Records
- Producer: Christian aTunde Adjuah

Christian Scott chronology
The Emancipation Procrastination (2017)	Ancestral Recall (2019)	Axiom (2020)

Professional ratings
Aggregate scores
Source	Rating
Metacritic	88/100
Review scores
Source	Rating
All About Jazz	4/5 stars
AllMusic	4.5/5 stars
DownBeat	4/5 stars
Exclaim!	8/10
Jazz Revelations	4/5 stars
Le Devoir	4.5/5 stars
Pitchfork	8/10
Tom Hull	B+

Ancestral Recall is a studio album by American jazz trumpeter Christian Scott released on March 22, 2019 by Ropeadope Records label. The album also features poet and songwriter Saul Williams.

== Background ==
The record is a follow-up album to his critically acclaimed triptych of albums named The Centennial Trilogy released in 2017. However, unlike the 2017 trilogy, Ancestral Recall is filled with many guest vocals. Scott explained that the title track and the whole album are "built as a map to decolonize sound; to challenge previously held misconceptions about some cultures of music; to codify a new folkloric tradition and begin the work of creating a national set of rhythms". To do so, he has weaved West African, First Nation, and African Diaspora/Caribbean rhythms and styles. He also mentioned that "All forms of expression in sound are valid, as all people are... this is the mantra of Ancestral Recall". The album consists of 12 tracks written mostly by Scott. The album was recorded on April 10, 15; September 6, 20; December 1, 2 of 2018 by Dave Weingarten at The Champagne Room West—and on April 29 and 30 of 2018 by Nick Guttmann at The Parlor, New Orleans, LA. The title track was released on February 5, 2019.

Wales Arts Review included the record in its list of the best 50 albums of 2019. Also, NPR included the album in its list of best music of 2019, ranking it #15.

== Reception ==
At Metacritic, that assigns a normalized rating out of 100 to reviews from mainstream critics, the album received an average score of 88, based on five reviews, which indicates "universal acclaim". JazzTimes included the album in the top 40 new albums of the year, ranking it #8. The review stated, "With its layers of roiling African-suffused percussion crossbreeding with Western instrumentation, gripping spoken-word interludes, and Adjuah’s own trumpet and electronics, Ancestral Recall teems with audacity and authority."

Giovanni Russonello of The New York Times stated "Since 2015 he has placed a new emphasis on patterned, polyrhythmic drumming, using a tightened-up approach and more explicitly melding the sounds of modern hip-hop with ancient, diasporic rhythms... The new album unifies the winning elements of Mr. Scott’s past work: the historical syncretism, the tensile band energy, the powerful physicality. Mr. Scott is not a collegiate-sounding trumpet player, and he plays with as much deference to New Orleanian and continental African traditions as to bebop. As a result, he plays fewer notes than most jazz trumpeters today, and his projection is more immediately majestic. He is following a path of his own, and so far, it’s still breaking new ground". Piotr Orlov of Pitchfork Media added "On Ancestral Recall, few elements are left tethered to the time-worn rules of “jazz,” yet, as the title makes abundantly clear, the past remains paramount, and old global cultures the preferred engines into the future. Led by voice, drums, and electronics, this version of stretch music cuts most recognizable instrumental sounds loose". In her review for DownBeat, Suzanne Lorge commented, "At times on Ancestral Recall, trumpeter Christian Scott aTunde Adjuah’s playing is so full of meaning that you almost can make out the intended words." Relix's Jeff Tamarkin wrote, "This is relentlessly powerful stuff, yet it’s never overwhelming—it floats in the air more than it pounds. Adjuah doesn’t need to work overtime to find his way into your head and heart; Ancestral Recall welcomes you in."

Matt Bauer of Exclaim! stated "Far more textured, and with a deeper rhythmic foundation than Adjuah's previous offerings, Ancestral Recall is a syncopated and immersive delight... Cohesive and eclectic, Ancestral Recall is a sonic expedition to remember". Matt Collar of AllMusic commented "Ancestral Recall is a stylistically and culturally dynamic album borne out of Scott's deep awareness of his New Orleans roots and African American history, and his ability to push his forward-thinking post-bop skills into musical traditions far beyond jazz. However, the real revelation is that the album also manages to feel intensely personal, imbued throughout with a deep sensuality and romantic creative vision that feels distinctly his own". Jim Hynes of Glide Magazine stated "Close your eyes and imagine a New Orleans multi-cultural street parade 50 or 60 years from now – pulsating rhythms, chants, and soaring horns that shift seamlessly from acoustic to electronic modes. There’s just so much to feast the ears on, that it takes multiple listens to begin to digest it. All forms of expression in sound are valid, according to Adjuah. You’ll hear more than you can possibly count, many you’ve never heard before, especially when considering the amalgam of all".

== Track listing ==
Ancestral Recall track listing
No.	Title	Writer(s)	Length
1.	"Her Arrival"	Scott	4:36
2.	"I Own the Night"	Scott, Williams	5:01
3.	"The Shared Stories of Rivals [KEITA]"	Scott, Williams	4:38
4.	"Forevergirl"	Sarah Elizabeth Charles, Mike Ward Jr., Christian Scott, Chris Turner	5:37
5.	"Diviner [Devan]"	Scott	3:55
6.	"Overcomer"	Scott	4:58
7.	"Songs She Never Heard"	Scott	6:04
8.	"Ritual (Rise of Chief Adjuah)"	Scott	6:02
9.	"Prophesy"	Scott, Williams	4:11
10.	"Before"	Scott	6:23
11.	"Double Consciousness"	Scott	3:56
12.	"Ancestral Recall"	Scott, Williams	6:07
Total length:			1:01:28

== Personnel ==
- Christian Scott – African drums, drums, flugelhorn, keyboards, mallets, percussion, siren, trumpet, vocals
- Weedie Braimah – percussion, vocals
- Mike Larry Draw – vocals
- Corey Fonville – drums
- Amadou Kouyate – percussion
- Kris Funn – bass
- Lawrence Fields – piano
- Devan Mayfield – vocals
- Themba Mkhatshwa – percussion
- Elena Pinderhughes – flute
- Munir Zakee Richard – percussion
- Logan Richardson – alto
- Chris Turner – vocals
- Saul Williams – vocals
- Qmillion – mixer
- Dave Weingarten - recording engineer
- Nick Guttmann - recording engineer

== Chart performance ==
Chart	Peak position
US Top Jazz Albums (Billboard)	9
