= Rewind That =

Studio album by Christian Scott
- Released: March 28, 2006 (US), April 17, 2006 (UK)
- Recorded: February 9–11, 2005
- Studio: Fantasy Studios, Berkeley, CA
- Genre: Jazz
- Length: 64:23
- Label: Concord Music Group
- Producer: Chris Dunn, Christian Scott

Christian Scott chronology
Two of a Kind (2004)	Rewind That (2006)	Anthem (2007)

Professional ratings
Review scores
Source	Rating
Allmusic	2.5/5 stars
All About Jazz	3.5/4 stars
PopMatters	8/10 stars
Sputnikmusic	3.9/5
Tom Hull	B+

Rewind That is a studio album by American jazz trumpeter Christian Scott on Concord Records released on March 28, 2006. It is his debut album for Concord Records. Rewind That was nominated for a Grammy.

== Reception ==
Quentin Huff of PopMatters wrote "And then there's Rewind That, Scott's 11-track debut. What else can you do except be jealous of trumpet playing this textured, this lush, and arrangements this smooth? Not content to simply cover tunes by the greats, Scott has the audacity to compose his own, like the funky tune "Caught Up" or his danceable tribute to his twin brother Kiel. Wait a minute. Twin brother? You mean there are TWO of them? (Kiel, a talented visual artist, contributed some nice photography for the album cover and liner notes.) This album features Scott's interplay of music and storytelling, using the actual instruments of course but also the song titles themselves to create a package of tunes that sound like the score for a collection of short stories or miniature films. I felt this way when I first heard the album and was further convinced by Scott's comments on the press release, "Everyone wanted me to do a straight-ahead album, but that's like meeting a woman and trying to be like her last boyfriend. You've got to be special." There he goes again (sigh), insisting on being different."

Ken Dryden of Allmusic stated "Christian Scott ... shows promise as a soloist, but none of his compositions and arrangements on his debut recording as a leader is particularly memorable. His heavy reliance on hip-hop and R&B influences rather than jazz results in a sameness that proves distracting from his solos."

== Track listing ==
All tracks are written by Christian Scott unless otherwise indicated. In the CD liner notes, "Kiel" is given the subtitle "(Song for my Brother)".

1. Rewind That (5:18)
2. Say It (6:27)
3. Like This (5:00)
4. So What (4:04), written by Miles Davis
5. Rejection (7:22)
6. Lay in Vein (6:17)
7. She (4:46)
8. Suicide (6:42)
9. Caught Up (5:32)
10. Paradise Found (6:35), written by Donald Harrison, Jr.
11. Kiel (6:20)

== Personnel ==
- Christian Scott – trumpet
- Walter Smith III – tenor saxophone (except on "Rewind That")
- Matthew Stevens – guitar (except on "So What")
- Zaccai Curtis – Fender rhodes ("Rewind That", "Say It", "Rejection", "Lay in Vein", & "Caught Up"), Wurlitzer ("She", "Like This", "So What", "Suicide", & "Kiel")
- Luques Curtis – acoustic bass (all tracks except electric bass on "Rewind That" & "Like This")
- Thomas Pridgen – drums
- Donald Harrison – alto saxophone ("Suicide", "So What", "Kiel", & "Paradise Found")

== Chart performance ==
Chart (2006)	Peak position
US Jazz Albums (Billboard)	28
