= Stretch Music =

Studio album by Chief Xian aTunde Adjuah
- Released: September 18, 2015
- Recorded: December 17–19, 2014
- Studio: The Berklee College of Music's; Shames Family Scoring Stage, Boston, MA; The Parlor, New Orleans, LA
- Genre: Jazz
- Length: 50:56
- Label: Ropeadope Records RAD-285, Stretch Music
- Producer: Chris Dunn

Chief Xian aTunde Adjuah chronology
Ninety Miles Live at Cubadisco (2012)	Stretch Music (2015)	Ruler Rebel (2017)

Professional ratings
Review scores
Source	Rating
Financial Times	4/5 stars
Jazzwise	4/5 stars
Pitchfork	7.5/10
Spectrum Culture	3.5/5 stars
Tom Hull	B+

Stretch Music (Introducing Elena Pinderhughes) is a studio album by American jazz trumpeter Chief Xian aTunde Adjuah released on September 18, 2015, by Ropeadope Records. This is his fifth full-length studio album as a leader.

== Background ==
Adjuah explains that his concept of stretch music (or "forecasting cells" in his liners) is an approach to create a more absorbent and sensitive kind of jazz. The concept fully understands and respects the jazz traditions that came before and doesn't attempt to replace them, instead trying to embrace within its rhythmic and harmonic frameworks as many musical forms and cultural languages as possible. "We are attempting to stretch—not replace—jazz's rhythmic, melodic and harmonic conventions to encompass as many musical forms/languages/cultures as we can," he says on his website. He started exploring this approach on his 2010 album Yesterday You Said Tomorrow. His next albums Christian aTunde Adjuah and Stretch Music are thoughtful extensions of that trend.

== Reception ==
Carter Moon of XFDR Magazine stated: "What [Adjuah] did best on this album was choose the right percussionists to play along with him. Corey Fonville and Joe Dyson Jr. consistently lay down a fantastic breakbeat backbone on every track to lend the vibrancy and immediacy of great hip hop. The explosion of hip hop-inspired contemporary jazz has started interesting conversations in both genres. Hip hop is often thought of as being lowbrow music, but its recent fraternization with jazz has drawn out the sheer musical intuition that makes the genre so effective. Conversely, hip hop gives jazz a looser and less intellectual feeling – it's music that’s actually fun to listen to that comes as much from the heart and the gut as the head. [Chief Xian aTunde Adjuah] fits perfectly in this new merging of genres, and it’s exciting to imagine him collaborating with any of the Brainfeeder artists and exploring work with rappers. Even if he never comes in direct contact with these parts of the musical world, Stretch Music is an exciting enough of a contribution to be more than enough."

In listing it among his ten favorite albums of the 2010s, Rob Shepherd of PostGenre noted: "Instead of choosing to focus primarily on [jazz or hip hop], it pulls both forms from a place of equal footing toward a middle where they merge into one new and vibrant music. Flourishes from other influences – particularly alternative rock, R&B, African drum music, Caribbean music, brass band and second-line music from his home city of New Orleans – are sprinkled throughout as well. Although wholly individualistic, one is left wondering whether perhaps this is the future of trumpet music – now fully realized – that Miles Davis once imagined back during the last decade of his life."

Nathan Stevens of Spectrum Culture wrote: "Stretch Music might be the most appropriate title for an album this year. The genre in question here is jazz, but it’s stretched and mutated at all different angles and sides, stretched to its limits. Of course, that's not surprising when the man behind the stretching has a few Edison awards kicking around his house and education from the Berklee College of Music. That doesn’t sell [Chief Xian aTunde Adjuah] in quite the right way, though. It makes his work sound a bit too academic and sterile and, rest assured, it ain’t that. The trumpet master's fluttering approach to jazz devours textures from hip-hop just as easily as it samples from Latin grooves." Larry Blumenfeld of Wall Street Journal commented: "Mr. Adjuah has a way with melody and drama. Yet the most captivating aspect is the degree to which this music sounds like a conversation among the nine musicians in his band (plus, on some tracks, two guests)—not simply calls-and-responses, but more so ideas considered and traded with due care in real time."

== Track listing ==
Stretch Music track listing
No.	Title	Writer(s)	Length
1.	"Sunrise in Beijing" (feat. Elena Pinderhughes)	Adjuah	5:04
2.	"Twin"	Adjuah	4:15
3.	"Perspectives"	Adjuah	4:21
4.	"West of the West"	Adjuah	8:07
5.	"Liberation Over Gangsterism" (feat. Elena Pinderhughes)	Adjuah	4:09
6.	"The Corner" (feat. Braxton Cook)	Kris Funn	1:34
7.	"Of a New Cool"	Adjuah	7:34
8.	"Runnin 7's (For Big Chief Donald Harrison Sr.)"	Adjuah	2:07
9.	"Tantric"	Adjuah	4:24
10.	"The Last Chieftain" (feat. Matthew Stevens)	Adjuah	7:11
11.	"The Horizon"	Lawrence Fields	2:10
Total length:			50:56

== Personnel ==
- Chief Xian aTunde Adjuah – trumpet, sirenette and reverse flugelhorn
- Elena Pinderhughes – flute
- Braxton Cook – alto, straight alto
- Corey King – trombone
- Cliff Hines – guitar
- Lawrence Fields – piano
- Kris Funn – bass
- Corey Fonville – drums, SPD-SX pad (tracks 1 2 3 4 5 7 8 9 10)
- Joe Dyson Jr. – pan-African drums, SPD-SX (tracks 1 2 5 6 7 8 9 10 11)
- Warren Wolf – vibraphone (track 7)

== Chart performance ==
Chart (2015)	Peak position
US Jazz Albums (Billboard)	7
