= Zaccai Curtis =

American pianist and composer (born 1981)

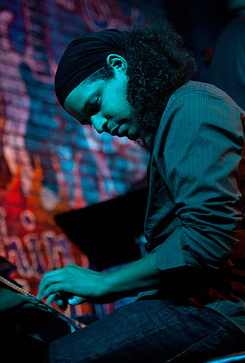
- Curtis in 2014

Background information
- Born: December 25, 1981 (age 44); New York City, US
- Genres: Jazz, Latin jazz
- Occupations: Musician, composer
- Instrument: Piano
- Label: Truth Revolution
- Website: Official website

Zaccai Greg Curtis (born December 25, 1981) is an American pianist and composer of Puerto Rican and African American descent. He won the 2025 Grammy Award for Best Latin Jazz Album for his album Cubop Lives!

== Biography ==
Curtis studied at Jackie McLean's Artists Collective school in Hartford, Connecticut. Curtis founded Truth Revolution, a record label that he refers to as "Truth Revolution Recording Collective, a working community of artists". The label issued Andy González's Entre Colegas, which was nominated for a 2017 Grammy Award.

Curtis and his brother, bassist Luques, are part of The Curtis Brothers Band (not to be confused with Michael and Richard Curtis, who also recorded as The Curtis Brothers). Their music is strongly influenced by Art Blakey and The Jazz Messengers.

The Curtis Brothers Band's first album, Blood, Spirit, Land, Water, Freedom, was followed around 2012 by Completion of Proof. Their album Algorithm, released around 2019, featured trumpeter Brian Lynch, alto saxophonist Donald Harrison, and drummer Ralph Peterson. Zaccai wrote all of the compositions that appear on the recording.

Curtis is also faculty at the University of Rhode Island, the Jackie McLean Institute at the HARTT School, and Western Connecticut State University.

== Discography ==
- Insight (2000)
- Blood, Spirit, Land, Water, Freedom (2010)
- Completion of Proof (2012)
- Nuestro Tango (2013)
- Algorithm (2020)
- Cubop Lives! (2024)
