= Harold López-Nussa =

Cuban jazz pianist

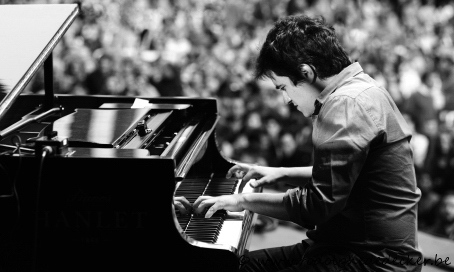

Background information
- Born: July 13, 1983; Havana, Cuba
- Genres: Pop, rock, jazz, Latin jazz
- Occupation: Musician
- Instrument: Piano
- Labels: Colibrí, Harmonia Mundi, World Village, Mack Avenue Records, Blue Note Records
- Website: www.haroldpiano.com

Harold López-Nussa Torres is a Cuban jazz pianist. He lives in Havana's Vedado neighborhood in Cuba and has French ancestry on his grandmother's side.

López-Nussa gave a concert in the 2006 Montreux Jazz Festival and recorded with Claude Nobs support, "Sobre el Atelier" in a Swiss studio.

== Career ==
López-Nussa was born into a musical family in Havana on July 13, 1983. His father, Ruy López-Nussa Lekszycki, and his younger brother Ruy Adrián López-Nussa are drummers and percussionist. His uncle Ernán López-Nussa is a well-known jazz pianist. His mother, Mayra Torres, was a piano teacher.

He started on piano when he was eight years old, attending the Manuel Saumell Elementary School of Music and Amadeo Roldán Conservatory. After graduating from the Instituto Superior de Artes, he toured with Omara Portuondo. In 2003, he worked with the Cuban National Symphony Orchestra. Two years later, he participated in a piano contest at the Montreux Jazz Festival and won first place. He released his first solo album, Canciones, in 2007. He has worked with Leo Brouwer, Gilles Peterson, and Alune Wade, and he has recorded with his father and brother.

== Discography ==
- 2007: Canciones (Colibrí)
- 2007: Sobre el Atelier (Harmonia Mundi)
- 2009: Herencia with Felipe Cabrera and Ruy Adrián López-Nussa (World Village)
- 2011: El Pais de Las Maravillas (World Village)
- 2013: New Day (Harmonia Mundi)
- 2015: Havana – Paris – Dakar (World Village)
- 2016: El Viaje (Mack Avenue Records)
- 2018: Un Dia Cualquiera (Mack Avenue Records)
- 2020: Te Lo Dije (Mack Avenue Records)
- 2023: Timba A La Americana (Blue Note Records)
- 2025: Nueva Timba with Ruy Adrián López-Nussa and Grégoire Maret (Blue Note Records)
