= Chief Xian aTunde Adjuah =

American jazz composer and trumpeter

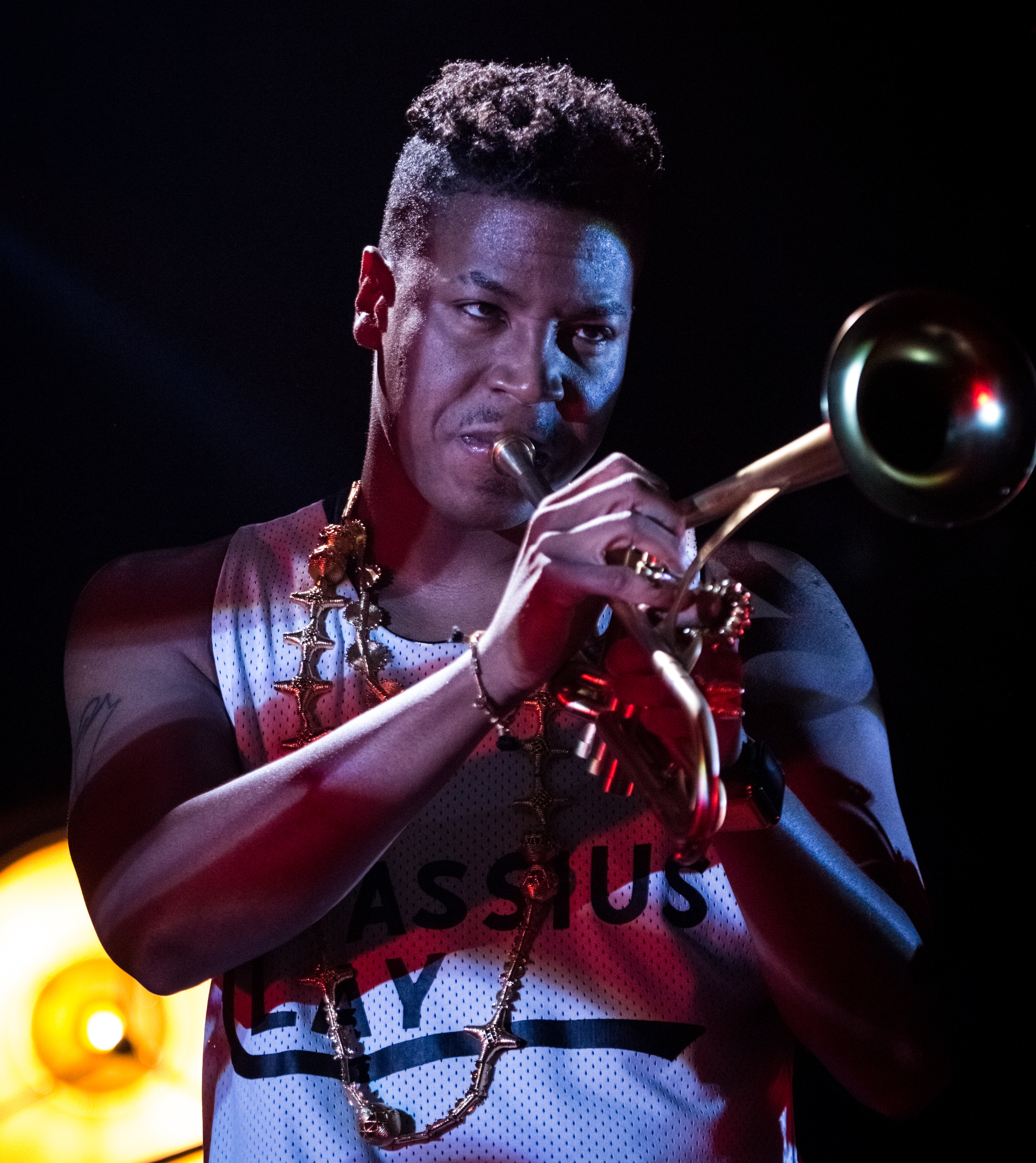
- Adjuah live in 2016 at Leverkusener Jazztage

Background information
- Also known as: Chief Adjuah, aTunde Adjuah, X. Adjuah, Xian Adjuah
- Born: Christian Scott; March 31, 1983 (age 43); New Orleans, Louisiana, U.S.
- Genres: Jazz; jazz-fusion; hip hop; alternative rock
- Occupations: Musician; composer
- Instruments: Trumpet; flugelhorn; drums; percussion; keyboards; cornet; soprano trombone
- Years active: 1996–present
- Labels: Universal; Concord; Ropeadope; Stretch; Impromp2
- Member of: R+R=NOW
- Website: chiefadjuah.com

Chief Xian aTunde Adjuah (/ˈzaɪ.ən/) (born March 31, 1983, formerly Christian Scott) is an American jazz trumpeter, multi-instrumentalist, composer, and producer.

He has been nominated for six Grammy Awards and is a two-time Edison Award winner. He has been named the Jazz FM Innovator of the Year and the Jazz Journalists Association Trumpeter of the Year. He has also received the Herb Alpert Award in the Arts, the Changing Worlds Peace Maker Award, and the Doris Duke Performing Arts Award. Adjuah is the nephew of jazz saxophonist Donald Harrison Jr. Adjuah is the Chieftain of the Xodokan Nation of Maroons and Grand Griot of New Orleans, an honor bestowed by the Ashé Cultural Center as part of annual rites commemorating the Maafa.

== Early life ==
Adjuah was born on March 31, 1983, in New Orleans, Louisiana, to Cara Harrison and Clinton Scott III. He has an identical twin brother, writer-director Kiel Adrian Scott. He began studying jazz with his uncle, jazz alto saxophonist Donald Harrison Jr, when he was 12. He attended the New Orleans Center for Creative Arts (NOCCA) for high school and studied jazz under the guidance of program directors Clyde Kerr Jr. and Kent Jordan. Adjuah appeared on Harrison Jr.’s albums Paradise Found and Kind of New after joining his uncle's quintet at age 16. He graduated from NOCCA in 2001.

== Career ==
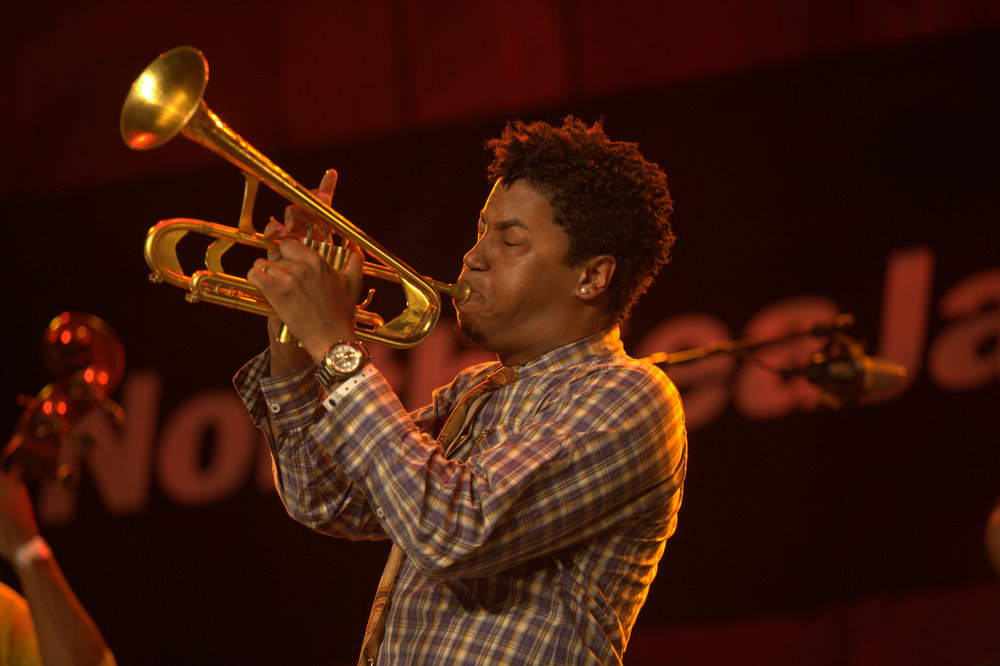
Scott in 2009

=== 2002–2009: Berklee, signing with Concord, major-label debut Rewind That, Live at Newport ===
Adjuah received a scholarship to attend Berklee College of Music in Boston, Massachusetts, where he majored in professional music with a concentration in film scoring and graduated in 2004. As a Berklee student, he started Impromp2 Records and released his first recording, Christian Scott (2002). As a student, he was a member of the Berklee Monterey Quartet, recorded as part of the Pat Metheny and Gary Burton–led Art:21 student cooperative quintet, and studied under the direction of Charlie Lewis, Dave Santoro, and Gary Burton.

Adjuah was signed to Concord Music in 2005. That year, he was featured on Nnenna Freelon's Grammy nominated Blueprint of a Lady. His Concord Records debut album Rewind That (2006) received a Grammy nomination for Best Contemporary Jazz Album.

In 2007, he released Anthem and, in 2008, Live at Newport, a CD/DVD set. Of this album, NPR raved "[Adjuah] Ushers In New Era of Jazz.”

He was named one of Ebony's 30 Young Leaders Under 30 in 2007.

=== 2010–2012: Yesterday You Said Tomorrow, Stretch Music, and Cuban collaborations ===
2010 saw the release of Yesterday You Said Tomorrow, which received an Edison Award, and the naissance of Adjuah's "Stretch Music" concept. Public radio station WNYC's Soundcheck has described Stretch Music as a fusion of "Trap Music (Southern hiphop, mixed with techno, dub, and dutch house), traditional West African percussion and New Orleanian Afro-Native American styles." According to scholar Stuart Nicholson, Adjuah coined "Stretch Music" because he "wanted to stretch the definition of jazz beyond the prescriptivist definitions of music."

In 2010, Adjuah toured with Atoms for Peace, a supergroup that was formed by Radiohead's Thom York of Radiohead and featured Red Hot Chili Peppers bassist Flea. That same year, he formed Ninety Miles with David Sánchez and Stefon Harris. The group spent a week recording with Cuban musicians Rember Duharte and Harold Lopez Nussa in Havana, Cuba. From this collaboration came the 2010 studio album Ninety Miles Project, a 2011 documentary of the same title, and the 2012 album Ninety Miles Live at Cubadisco, recorded at the 2010 Cubadisco festival in Havana.

In 2012, Adjuah released the double studio album Christian aTunde Adjuah. Reviewer John Fordham called it a "tour de force" and a "courageous and ambitious experiment." The album garnered Adjuah his second Edison Award for Best International Jazz Artist.

=== 2014–2020: Stretch Music, the Centennial Trilogy, R+R=NOW, and Axiom ===
Adjuah established his Stretch Music label in 2014. That same year he signed a partnership with Ropeadope Records. The inaugural release was 2015's album Stretch Music.

In 2017, Adjuah released three albums, collectively titled The Centennial Trilogy. The albums' launch commemorated the 100th anniversary of the first jazz recordings of 1917. The three releases are Ruler Rebel, Diaspora, and The Emancipation Procrastination. The Emancipation Procrastination was nominated for a 2018 Grammy Award in the Best Contemporary Instrumental Album.

Also in 2017, Adjuah joined R+R=NOW, "a supergroup assembled by Robert Glasper but functionally egalitarian." The sextet features Adjuah, Glasper, Terrace Martin, Derrick Hodge, Taylor McFerrin, and Esperanza Spalding drummer Justin Tyson. Blue Note Records issued the band's 2018 studio album Collagically Speaking as well as their 2021 live album R+R=NOW Live. Notably the band performed select dates during Glasper's "momentus" 24-night, 48-show residency at the famed Blue Note Jazz Club in October 2018.

In 2019 Adjuah released Ancestral Recall, which received a Grammy nomination for Best Contemporary Instrumental Album.

His next album, Axiom, was released in 2020 and was recorded live over five nights at the Blue Note Jazz Club in March 2020, just before New York City's live venues were closed due to the COVID-19 pandemic. Axiom received a Grammy nomination for Best Contemporary Instrumental Album.

Adjuah also received two Grammy nominations for Best Jazz Solo Performance for "Guinnevere" in 2020 and for "Sackodougou" in 2021.

=== 2021–2023: Chief Adjuah & the Sound Carved from Legend and the Doris Duke Award ===
In 2021, Adjuah formed a new group, Chief Adjuah & the Sound Carved from Legend, which played the closing night of New Orleans's Prospect.5 triennial in January 2022.

In 2022 Adjuah was the face of the BMW XM advertising campaign.

In 2023, Adjuah won the Doris Duke Foundation's Doris Duke Artist Award.

=== 2023: Bark Out Thunder Roar Out Lightning ===
On June 28, 2023, Adjuah released Bark Out Thunder Roar Out Lightning on Ropeadope Records. It is the first album on which Adjuah does not play the trumpet, instead using instruments of his own design. On the album, Adjuah "connects to a lineage of Black Indian recordings" like "Iko." Offbeat magazine hailed Adjuah's evolving sound, saying that with the record Adjuah "proves himself once again as an insightful and progressive musician forwarding the flames of ancestral cultures."

== Custom instrument design and development ==
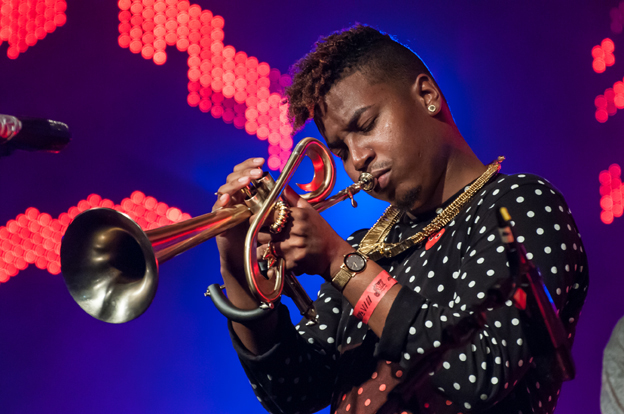
Adjuah with his Adams Reverse Flugel flugelhorn

Adjuah has designed a series of modified brass instruments produced and sold by Adams Musical Instruments. He told Interview in 2017 that his innovations are due in part to disliking the sound of the instrument: "Part of the reason why I create my own line of trumpets and all these different types of B-flat instruments is because I fucking hate the sound of the trumpet. It’s terrible!" His tilted-bell trumpet often garners comparisons to those played by Dizzy Gillespie, which featured bells bent upward at a 45-degree angle. Adjuah's is tilted upward at a 22-degree angle. The Reverse Flugel, which Adams markets as the Adjuah Trumpet, is an "inverted flugelhorn with shepherd's crooks" that is able to sound notes in a higher register. He has also developed the Siren (a trumpet-cornet hybrid), and a smaller version dubbed the Sirenette.

He also developed a double-sided electric harp, which he calls an "Adjuah bow." It combines the features of two traditional West African instruments, the ngoni and the kora. The bow was manufactured to Adjuah's specifications by Bob Grawi.

== Personal life ==
Adjuah married jazz vocalist Isadora Mendez in 2013. They have since divorced. Adjuah is the grandson of Big Chief Donald Harrison Sr. and the nephew of jazz saxophonist-composer, NEA Jazz Master Big Chief Donald Harrison, Jr.

=== Chiefdom and cultural lineage ===
Adjuah's family lineage comes from the Maroon culture and Mardi Gras Indian tradition of New Orleans. (Adjuah has said that he considers "Mardi Gras Indian" a pejorative term and prefers "Afro New Orleanian or Black Indian.") His maternal grandfather, Donald Harrison Sr., who began masking in 1949, led three Mardi Gras Indian tribes before founding and leading the Guardians of the Flame in 1988. His maternal uncle Donald Harrison Jr. is Big Chief of the Congo Square Nation Afro-New Orleans Cultural Group. Adjuah began participating in his grandfather's Guardians of the Flame in 1988 with his twin brother Kiel Adrian Scott as "spy boy" and "flag boy" respectively. He joined his uncle's Congo Square Nation in 1999 as "gang spy". Today, Adjuah is Chieftain of Xodokan Nation of maroons. In 2023, Adjuah was named Grand Griot of New Orleans at the Maafa Commemoration hosted by the Ashe Cultural Arts Center, a position previously held by his maternal grandmother, Guardians Institute founder Herreast Harrison.

=== Name change ===
Born Christian Andre Scott, he began performing under the name Christian Scott aTunde Adjuah in 2012 as a way of reflecting his family's West African and Indigenous lineage. "aTunde" and "Adjuah" are ancient cities in what is today Ghana. Of his name change he has said, "I wanted to create something that better reflected my identity and my background. I don't know specifically that my family came from Ghana – they may have come from Senegal or the Congo – but I sure as hell know that I'm not Scottish." In 2023, he had his name legally changed to Xian aTunde Adjuah and performs under Chief Adjuah.

== Film and television credits ==
- 2010: Passion Play, musician, Nate Poole's trumpet
- 2016: Articulate (subject)
- 2016: Samaria, executive producer, orchestration, trumpeter
- 2020:The Photograph, trumpeter (uncredited)
- 2020: American Masters In the Making: "Christian Scott aTunde Adjuah: The New Chief" (subject)

== Discography ==
=== As leader ===
- 2002: Christian Scott (Impromp2, 2003)
- 2005: Rewind That (Concord Jazz, 2006)
- 2007: Anthem (Concord Jazz, 2007)
- 2001–04: Two of a Kind with Donald Harrison (Nagel Heyer, 2008)
- 2008: Live at Newport (Concord Jazz, 2008) – live
- 2010: Yesterday You Said Tomorrow (Concord Jazz, 2010)
- 2011: Ninety Miles Project (Concord Jazz, 2011)
- 2012: Ninety Miles Live at Cubadisco (Concord Jazz, 2012) – live
- 2012: Christian aTunde Adjuah (Concord Jazz, 2012)
- 2015: Stretch Music (Ropeadope Records, 2015)
- 2017: Diaspora (Ropeadope/Stretch, 2017)
- 2017: Ruler Rebel (Ropeadope/Stretch, 2017)
- 2017: The Emancipation Procrastination (Ropeadope/Stretch, 2017)
- 2018: Collagically Speaking with R+R=NOW (Blue Note, 2018)
- 2019: Ancestral Recall (Ropeadope/Stretch, 2019)
- 2020: Axiom (Ropeadope, 2020) – live
- 2021: R+R=NOW Live with R+R=NOW (Blue Note, 2021) – live
- 2023: Bark Out Thunder Roar Out Lightning (Ropeadope, 2023)

=== As sideman ===
With Donald Harrison

- Real Life Stories (Nagel Heyer, 2002) – recorded in 2001
- Kind of New (Candid, 2002)
- Paradise Found (Fomp, 2003)

With others

- Philip Bailey, Love Will Find a Way (Verve, 2019)
- David Benoit, Jazz for Peanuts (Peak, 2008)
- DJ Logic & Jason Miles, Global Noize (Shanachie, 2008)
- Boney James, Shine (Concord, 2006)
- Jose James, No Beginning No End 2 (Rainbow Blonde, 2020)
- Ledisi, It's Christmas (Verve Forecast, 2008)
- Harvey Mason, Chameleon (Concord, 2014)
- Marcus Miller, Tutu Revisited (Dreyfus, 2011)
- Melissa Morgan, Until I Met You (Telarc, 2009)
- Akua Naru, The Miner's Canary (Urban Era, 2015)
- Sergio Pamies, Borrachito (Bebyne, 2011)
- Prince, Planet Earth (NPG/Columbia, 2007)
- Soulive, Live at the Blue Note Tokyo (P-Vine, 2010)
- Ben Williams, Coming of Age (Concord Jazz, 2015)
