= Wiidope =

US musical group

wiidope
- Genres: Hip hop, R&B, Dance, Pop
- Occupations: Producer, Music engineer, Songwriter, Composer
- Years active: 2009–present
- Members: Carl Seanté aka Clef Wonder; Kofi Owusu-Ofori; Kyuwon Kim
- Website: www.wiidope.com

wiidope is a production group of three musicians, composers and engineers that assembled in 2009 while attending Berklee College of Music for postgraduate studies. Members are Carl Seanté (McGrier II), Kofi Owusu-Ofori and Kyuwon "Q" Kim. Their most notable works include YouTube/MTV personality Todrick Hall, RuPaul, Brandy, Tamar Braxton, Korean Boy-band SHINee and their work on the Grammy Award winning album, The Mosaic Project, with jazz drummer, composer and vocalist Terri Lyne Carrington.

== Notable works ==
Year	Song(s) Credited	Artist(s)	Writers/Composers/Producers	Album/Film & Label	Awards/Charts
2018	All Songs	Todrick Hall, Brandy, Tamar Braxton, Jade Novah, Nick Burroughs, Keala Settle, RuPaul, Cynthia Erivo, Shangela, feat. Tiffany Haddish, Jennifer Lewis	Hall, McGrier, Owusu-Ofori, Ducornet	Forbidden	Dem Beats Single Debut Top 100 iTunes Charts March 23, 2018 Album Debut #1 on Pop Charts, #2 Overall
2015-2017	All Songs	Todrick Hall, Jordin Sparks, Tamar Braxton, Amber Riley, Jay Armstrong, Nicole Scherzinger, RuPaul, Shoshana Bean, Raven Symone, Joseph Gordon-Levitt, Perez Hilton, Bob The Drag Queen	Katherine Fairfax Wright (Director, Documentary)	Todrick Hall: Behind The Curtain	Best Documentary Feature Film North Carolina Gay and Lesbian Film Festival 2017 Nominee Chicken & Egg Award SXSW 2017
2015-2017	All Songs	Todrick Hall, Jordin Sparks, Tamar Braxton, Amber Riley, Jay Armstrong, Nicole Scherzinger, RuPaul, Shoshana Bean, Raven Symone, Joseph Gordon-Levitt, Perez Hilton, Bob The Drag Queen	Hall, McGrier, Owusu-Ofori, Ducornet	Straight Outta Oz	Best Documentary Feature Film North Carolina Gay and Lesbian Film Festival 2017 Nominee Chicken & Egg Award SXSW 2017
2013-2014	All Songs	Todrick Hall, Victoria Justice, Joey Graceffa, Glozell, Kingsley, Harvey Guillén, Tre Melvin, Miles Jai, Orlando Brown, Brashaad Mayweather, Tevin William, J-Light, Kimberly Cole	Frank Churchill, Amethyst Kelly Charlotte Aitchison George Astasio Jason Pebworth Jon Shave Kurtis McKenzie, Hall, McGrier, Owusu-Ofori, Kim, Jean-Ives Ducornet	Snow White & The Seven Thugz'	
2013-2014	Misc. Songs and Material (previously credited)	Todrick Hall, IM5 (Cole Pendery, Dana Vaughns, Gabe Morales, Will Behlendorf, David Scarzone), Vonzell Solomon, Chester Lockhart, Carlie Craig, Thursday Lyons & Rotating Cast	Hall, McGrier, Owusu-Ofori, Kim, Ducornet	Twerk Du Soleil	
2013-2014	Disney Dudez 2 & 3 (Mashups) Monsterbia (Mashup) Bang Bang Fancy	Todrick Hall, IM5 (Cole Pendery, Dana Vaughns, Gabe Morales, Will Behlendorf, David Scarzone), Vonzell Solomon, J-Light, Vegaz Taelor	Hall, McGrier, Owusu-Ofori, Kim	IM5 & Todrick Hall Presents: #Bandcamp IM5 & Todrick Hall Presents: Disney Dudez'	As of March 2015, The series' holds over 25 million views
2013-2014	Twerkin In The Rain Sound Of Trap Music All That Azz Greasy Where You At Christmas Mr. Grinch Welcome Christmas	Todrick Hall, Carlie Craig, Daynah Cooper	Nacio Herb Brown, Richard Rodgers, Jim jacobs, Warren Casey, John Kander, Hall, McGrier, Owusu-Ofori, Kim	What The Funny Presents: Todrick Hall WhatTheFunny.com Executive Producer: Marlon Wayans, Rick Alvarez	As of March 2015, Series holds over 5 million views on multiple networks
2013-2014	Take A Picture I Can Imma Diva Mrs. Timberlake Grind	Todrick Hall, Sideara St. Claire, Jayleen Griffin, Asia'h Epperson, Lauren Berry, Kendra Hill, Michael Rexford	Hall, McGrier, Owusu-Ofori, Kim	MyISH Presents: Pop Star High	As of March 2015, Series holds over 6.7 million views
2013-2014	We Are America	Esperanza Spalding	Spalding, Prince (TAFKAP), Chris Turner, McGrier, Owusu-Ofori, Kim	Untitled; Independent	
2012	Run Dat Back	Jadagrace	McGrier, Owusu-Ofori, Kim, Dodd-Waddington	Now That's What I Call Music, Vol. 42 Universal Music Group	Top 20 Billboard Dance
2012	Lil Mama (wiimix)	J-Light	Dodd-Waddington, McGrier, Owusu-Ofori	106 & Park Live Performance "Wild Out Wednesday" (W.O.W.) Air-Date: 2012-03-28 18:00 EST; 18:00 PST BET Networks (Viacom)	"W.O.W." Champion BET 106 & Park (J-Light)
2011	Sisters On The Rise (Transformation) Simply Beautiful Remix	Cassandra Wilson, Shea Rose, Nona Hendryx, Esperanza Spalding, Terri Lyne Carrington, Ingrid Jensen, Tia Fuller	Terri Lyne Carrington, Nona Hendryx, Kevan Staples, Carol Pope, Rose, McGrier, Owusu-Ofori, Kim	The Mosaic Project Concord Jazz	Best Jazz Vocal Album 54th Grammy Awards 2012. No.4 Billboard Charts (Jazz Albums) Jazz Award for Songwriting SESAC (Shea Rose)
2011	All Songs	Shea Rose, Christel, Raheem Jamal, Kofi	Rose, McGrier, Owusu-Ofori, Kim, Daniel Rose, Christel Rushing, Raheem Jamal	Little Warrior Independent	R&B/Soul/Urban Contemporary Artist of the Year (Shea Rose) Boston Music Awards 2011
2010	Up & Down	SHINee	McGrier, Owusu-Ofori, Kim, Misfit, Jonghyun	Lucifer SM Entertainment/Universal Records/EMI Music Japan/Avex Asia	#1 Album_{(KOREA)}
2010	NO, NO, NO	Spontania	McGrier, Owusu-Ofori, Kim, Massattack, Tarantula, Kaori	Departures Universal Music Group Far Eastern Tribe Records	

== Notable acts and credits ==
- Brandy
- Chester Gregory
- Cynthia Erivo
- Esperanza Spalding
- IM5
- Jadagrace
- Jade Novah
- Jeeve Ducornet
- Jordin Sparks
- Joseph Gordon-Levitt
- Keala Settle
- Nicole Scherzinger
- Nona Hendryx
- Prince
- Raney Shockne
- Raven Symone
- RuPaul
- Shea Rose
- SHINee
- Shoshana Bean
- Tamar Braxton
- Terri Lyne Carrington
- Todrick Hall
- Vonzell Solomon
- WeeklyChris

== Mentors ==
- Susan Rogers
- Prince Charles Alexander
- David Jeong
- Kerry Gordy
