= Doug Johnson (pianist) =

American jazz and classical pianist

Doug Johnson is an American jazz and classical pianist who has performed with Esperanza Spalding and Grace Kelly. He teaches at the Berklee College of Music and at Wellesley College.

== Education ==
Doug Johnson received a B.M. from Michigan State University and an M.M. from the New England Conservatory, where he studied with Dave Holland and George Russell.

== Performances ==
Johnson has performed extensively in the U.S. at major venues such as the Jazz Standard in New York City. In Europe, he has performed in London, Vienna, Berlin, Paris, and Copenhagen. Festivals he has played at include Montreal, Toronto, Tanglewood, Oslo, Boston, Warsaw, and Newport Jazz Festival.

He has performed with Esperanza Spalding's quintet. Other musicians he has performed with include Luciana Souza, Mili Bermejo, Chiara Civello, the Grand Rapids Symphony, and the Handel and Haydn Society.

== Discography ==
- The March of Time, 2008

With Grace Kelly

- Mood Changes, 2009
- Every Road I Walked, 2006
- Times Too, 2005
- Dreaming, 2004
