= Mike Marciano =

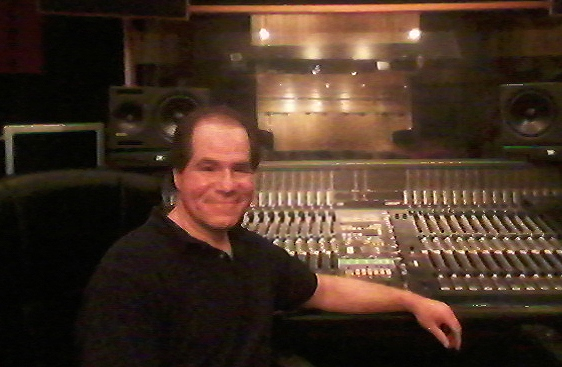
- Occupation: Audio engineer

Mike Marciano is an audio engineer. He has won two Grammy awards, and has been nominated for a Grammy six times. He is also a multi platinum and gold record, Junos and GMA award recipient. He started his career in 1980, recording, mixing and mastering exclusively at Systems Two Recording Studio in Brooklyn, New York.

Early in his career, he worked with many well-known rock and heavy metal groups, including Type O Negative, Carnivore, Agnostic Front, Life of Agony. Many of his hardcore and metal credits are noted in Encyclopaedia Metallum. His work with Type O Negative was used in multiple movie soundtracks and other media.

Since the early 90s, he has worked with some of the top musicians in the jazz field, including like Wynton Marsalis (and his Grammy-nominated Joe Cool's Blues), Brad Mehldau, Robert Glasper,Clark Terry, Elvin Jones, and Steve Coleman. His work with Don Braden was used as the theme song for Cosby.

== Accolades ==
In 2011, he received his first Grammy Award for Best Jazz Vocal Album "The Mosaic Project" by Terri Lynne Carrington. Then, in 2013 he received his second Grammy Award for Best Jazz Instrumental Album, "Money Jungle: Provocative in Blue", by Terri Lynne Carrington.

In 2016, Marciano recorded In for a Penny, In for a Pound by Henry Threadgill, which received a Pulitzer Prize for Music.

The same year his work on Impromptu by the Rodriguez Brothers was also nominated for a Grammy Award.

In 2017, his work on Madera Latino by Brian Lynch was nominated for a Grammy.

In 2018, Two additional projects that Marciano engineered were nominated for Grammy's,Tipico by Miguel Zenón and Art of the Arrangement by Doug Beavers.

Also in 2019, Mike's work on Happened, Happening by Yuying Hsu won him a Golden Melody Award for Best Instrumental Recording Album - Technical Category.

In 2019, his work on Elio Villafranca's Cinque was nominated for a Best Latin Jazz Album Grammy Award.

In 2020, his work on Carib by David Sánchez was nominated for a Grammy Award in the Best Latin Jazz album category.

In 2021, Mike received his Grammy Win certificate for his mastering work on "Puertos: Music from International Waters": by The Emilio Solla Tango Jazz Orchestra, Best Jazz Album

Also in 2021, he received a Juno award for Andy Milne and Unison's Best Jazz Album Award for reMission.

Also in 2021, another project Mike recorded, mixed and mastered received a Grammy Award nomination for Best Latin Jazz Album for Dafnis Prieto Sextet "Transparency"

Mike is credited on well over 1,300 recordings. He continues his career as "Systems Two", recording, mixing, and mastering some of today's top jazz albums.

=== Gold and Platinum RIAA Certified Awards ===
- Life is Killing Me Single (Cert. Gold 2026)
- Mortal Kombat Soundtrack (Cert. Platinum 1996)
- Howard Stern - Private Parts (Cert. Platinum 1997)
- Bloody Kisses (Cert. Gold 1995, Cert. Platinum 2000)
- October Rust (Cert. Gold 2000)
- Nativity in Black - A Tribute to Black Sabbath (Cert. Gold 2000)
- After Dark DVD (Cert. Gold 2000)

== Recorded work in media ==
=== Use on movie soundtracks ===
- Bride of Chucky ("Love You to Death" by Type O Negative)
- Freddy vs. Jason ("We Were Electrocute" by Type O Negative)
- I Know What You Did Last Summer ("Summer Breeze" by Type O Negative)
- Howard Stern - Private Parts ("Pictures of Matchstick Men" by Ozzy Osbourne with Type O Negative)
- Mortal Kombat ("Blood and Fire" by Type O Negative)
- The Blair Witch Project ("Haunted" by Type O Negative)
- Nosferatu (Type O Negative Compilation)
- Descent 2

=== Use in other media ===
- Cosby (theme song)
- Descent (video game)
- Descent II – The Vertigo Series
- Blood
- Grand Theft Auto IV
- The Darkness
- NASCAR: Crank It Up
