= Douglas Johnson =

Douglas Johnson may refer to:

- Doug Johnson (American football) (born 1977), American football player
- Doug Johnson (Australian footballer) (1920–2002), Australian footballer
- Doug Johnson (Loverboy), keyboardist for the Canadian rock group Loverboy
- Doug Johnson (Minnesota politician) (1942–2022), American politician and educator
- Doug Johnson (pianist), American jazz and classical pianist
- Doug Johnson (record producer), American record producer and songwriter
- Douglas Wilson Johnson (1878–1944), American geomorphologist
- Douglas Johnson (historian) (1925–2005), British historian
- Douglas H. Johnson, American expert on Sudan
- Georgia Douglas Johnson (1880–1966), African-American poet and playwright

== See also ==
- Douglas Johnston (disambiguation)
- Douglas Johnstone (disambiguation)
