= Arturo Stable =

Cuban-American musician, educator, arts administrator, filmmaker, author

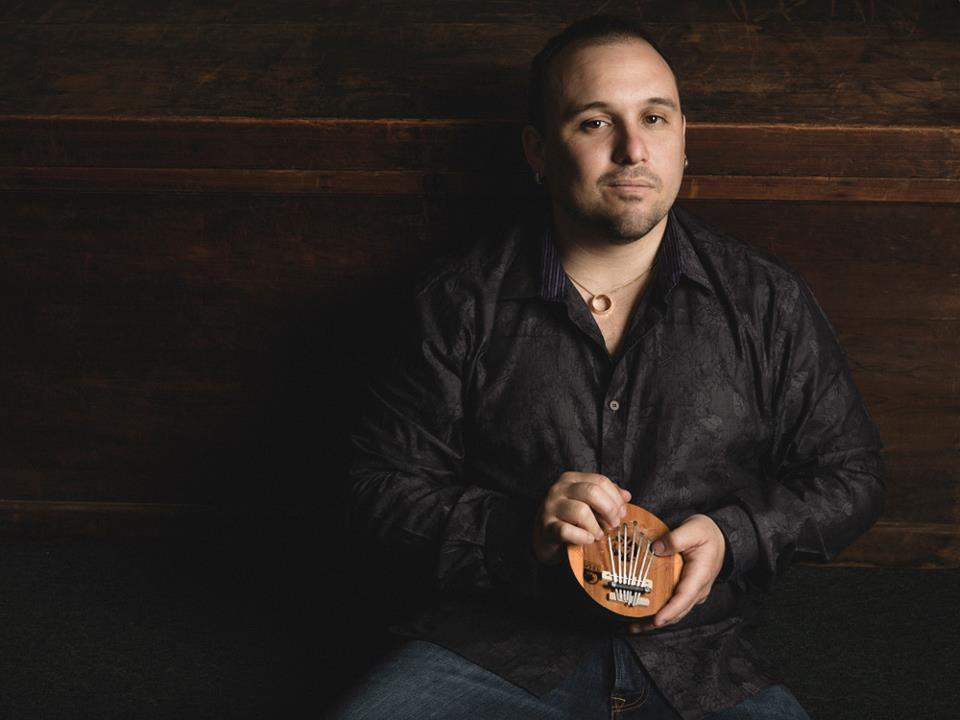

Background information
- Origin: Santiago de cuba, Cuba
- Genres: Jazz, Latin jazz, Afro-Cuban jazz
- Occupations: Musician, producer, educator and entrepreneur
- Instruments: Conga, bongo, timbal, bata drums, frame drums, darbuka, djembe, pandero and cajon
- Years active: 1990s–present
- Labels: Origen Records, Motéma
- Website: www.astablefreedom.com

Arturo Stable is a Cuban-American musician, educator, arts administrator, entrepreneur, filmmaker, and author. He is recognized for his work in Latin jazz and contemporary music, and has performed internationally as both a solo artist and collaborator. Stable has released several albums as a leader and teaches at the university level in the United States.

== Early life and education ==
Stable was born in Santiago de Cuba. His family later moved to Havana, where he completed formal studies in music and composition, earning a degree in percussion from the Amadeo Roldán Conservatory, followed by a degree in music education from Puebla State University. He later pursued contemporary writing and production at Berklee College of Music and completed a master’s degree in jazz composition and music business at the University of the Arts.

== Biography ==
In 1993, Stable relocated to Puebla, Mexico, where he worked as a sideman across Latin jazz, rock, and traditional styles. He also began his career as an educator, teaching classical and Afro-Cuban percussion at the Puebla State University (Benemérita Universidad Autónoma de Puebla).

After his graduation from Berklee College of Music, he became a foundational member and Dean of the Percussion Department at Musinetwork School of Music, a contemporary music online school.

Stable then began producing music albums. He has released 3 albums as a leader and 1 album as co-leader with Elio Villafranca. The album Jazz Meets the Classics, recorded together with Paquito D'Rivera, won the Best Latin Jazz Album category in the 16th Annual Latin GRAMMY Awards. Stable also featured in Money Jungle: Provocative in Blue by Terri Lyne Carrington, which won the Grammy for Best Jazz Vocal Album during the 56th Annual GRAMMY Awards. He also participated and helped direct various Jazz Music Festivals in the U.S. and abroad.

He has performed at national and international jazz festivals including the San Francisco Jazz Festival and the Vitoria-Gasteiz jazz festival. He appeared at the 10th International Puebla Festival in Mexico. He also served as adjunct artistic director of the inaugural Puebla Jazz Festival, collaborating with the Puebla State University and other sponsoring institutions.

Since 2017, Stable has expanded his work beyond performance into arts consulting, festival curation, film, and writing. In 2018, he served as a consultant for the Kimmel Center for the Performing Arts. He also founded two major percussion events: the Philadelphia Percussion Festival, established in 2012, and the UCLA International Percussion Festival, launched in 2022. In addition to his work in music, he directed and produced two documentary films, The Artist Body (2021) and Son Habana (2024). He also published a novel, Ebony Brown: The Awakening, released in 2025.

After becoming a consummate musician, Stable decided to expand his career to new artistic mediums and disciplines, focusing more on management, production and marketing. He also now holds a Master's degree in Jazz Composition and Music Business from the University of the Arts (Philadelphia).

Stable currently teaches music at a university.

== Discography ==
=== Albums as leader ===
- 3rd Step (Origen Records, 2004) – Arturo's first album as a band leader.
- Notes on Canvas (Origen Records, 2007) – with the participation of more than 15 musicians, featuring among them Grammy Award winners Paquito D'Rivera and David Sánchez.
- Call (Origen Records, 2009) – a quintet outing showcasing pianist Aruan Ortiz, bassist Edward Perez, saxophonist Javier Vercher and drummer Francisco Mela, with special guest Ian Izquierdo on violin.
- Cuban Crosshatching (Origen Records, 2013) – features jazz notables, Lionel Loueke and Seamus Blake.

=== Albums as co-leader ===
- Dos Y Mas (Motéma, 2012) – the debut recording of Elio Villafranca and Arturo Stable's piano and percussion collaboration.
