= Mood Changes (album) =

Studio album by Grace Kelly
- Released: May 5, 2009
- Genre: Jazz
- Label: Pazz Productions

Grace Kelly chronology
GRACEfulLEE (2008)	Mood Changes (2009)	Man with the Hat (2011)

Mood Changes is a jazz album by American saxophonist and vocalist Grace Kelly. It was released on May 5, 2009. The tracks "101" and "I Want to Be Happy" were winners of the 2008 ASCAP Young Jazz Composers Award and the 2008 Downbeat Magazine student music awards. The liner notes were written by the Los Angeles Times journalist, Don Heckman.

== Track listing ==
Tracks

1. "Happy Theme Song" (5:32)
2. "Comes Love" (5:54)
3. "Tender Madness" (4:26)
4. "101" (6:12)
5. "But Life Goes On" (4:00)
6. "Ain't No Sunshine" (6:13)
7. "Here, There and Everywhere" (6:13)
8. "I'll Remember April" (3:17)
9. "It Might As Well Be Spring" (5:38)
10. "I Want to Be Happy" (4:26)

== Personnel ==
- Grace Kelly – alto/soprano/tenor saxophones and vocals
- Jason Palmer – trumpet
- Doug Johnson – piano
- John Lockwood – bass, electric bass
- Jordan Perlson – drums (1,3,4,8,9)
- Terri Lyne Carrington – drums (2,5,6,7,10)
- Adam Rogers – guitar (6,7)
- Hal Crook – trombone (10)
