= Laurie Geltman =

American singer

Laurie Geltman (born in Baltimore and raised in Boston), is an American rock singer-songwriter-guitarist. She studied at the Berklee College of Music as a film score major, and began performing in the early 1990s with the experimental rock group Vasco da Gama. She was a Boston Music Awards winner in 1998 for Outstanding Female Vocalist. After that, she began her solo career. She released her first album, Departure, herself, then her second album, No Power Steering on her own label. A year after its release, No Power Steering was re-released by Eastern Front Records. She also released her third album Motion Pictures, on her own label. Her song "Ghost in the House" appeared on the Respond I compilation, a benefit CD for domestic violence groups, which includes also songs from Patty Larkin, Melissa Ferrick, Jenny Reynolds and Faith Soloway among others.

== Discography ==
- Departure (self-released) (1992)
- No Power Steering (1997)RBP (1998) Eastern Front Records/Koch Int'l
- Motion Pictures (recorded live at Club Passim) (1999)
- Up From Down (under band name LAYNE) (2006)
- "Radio" (Single) Laurie Geltman (Released Feb. 17, 2023)
- "Break Up This Fallow Ground" (Single) Laurie Geltman (Released March 1st, 2024)
