= Diamond Cut =

Diamond Cut may refer to:

- Diamond cut
- Diamond Cut (Bonnie Tyler album), 1979
- Diamond Cut (Tia Fuller album), 2018

== See also ==
- Diamond Cut Productions, an American company
