= Jazz Is a Spirit =

Studio album by Terri Lyne Carrington
- Released: 2002
- Recorded: February 2001
- Studio: Master Control Studio, Burbank, California
- Genre: Jazz
- Length: 1:03:17
- Label: ACT; 9408-2
- Producer: Terri Lyne Carrington

Terri Lyne Carrington chronology
Real Life Story (1989)	Jazz Is a Spirit (2002)	Structure (2004)

Jazz Is a Spirit is an album by drummer Terri Lyne Carrington. It was recorded before an audience at Master Control Studio in Burbank, California during February 2001, and was released in 2002 by the German label ACT Music. On the album, Carrington is joined by saxophonists Gary Thomas and Katisse Buckingham, trumpeters Terence Blanchard and Wallace Roney, keyboardists Herbie Hancock and Greg Kurstin, guitarists Paul Bollenback, Kevin Eubanks, Jeff Richman, and Danny Robinson, bassists Bob Hurst and Malcolm-Jamal Warner, and percussionists Ed Barguiarena and Darryl "Munyungo" Jackson.

When asked about the album title, Carrington responded: "one day my good friend Dianne Reeves told me that she heard Abbey Lincoln, when asked the same question, proclaim, 'Jazz Is a Spirit.' I immediately realized that I agreed and that she had hit the proverbial nail on the head penning this phrase and I have quoted it, giving her props, ever since."

The track titled "Mr. Jo Jones" is a drum solo accompanied by a spoken recording of Papa Jo Jones, who was a friend of Carrington's family, and who occasionally allowed Carrington to sit in with his band when she was a youth. Carrington reflected: "going to see Papa Jo was special because I knew that he was the father of modern jazz drumming... Also, listening to him and watching him swing, he had a style about him–the way he swung was just different to the more modern players I was listening to at that time." Regarding Carrington's playing on the track, author Meta DuEwa Jones wrote that her "tips, taps, raps, and crackles of percussive sound all color Jones's language while also containing it as a kind of solo performance. In so doing, she reminds us that every moment of speech is a potential performative interaction."

== Reception ==
Professional ratings
Review scores
Source	Rating
AllMusic	3.5/5 stars
The Penguin Guide to Jazz	3/4 stars

In a review for AllMusic, Jonathan Widran wrote: "This free-spirited recording emerges from the fun of bebop and traditional jazz balladry into the more challenging realm of tribal rhythms and global-mindedness -- a wacky journey to be sure, but true to her heart of wanderlust and her contention that, indeed, jazz can only be defined as a spirit... Innovative yet sometimes maddening, this is above all else her truest heart."

The authors of The Penguin Guide to Jazz Recordings noted that "the playing is of a very high calibre," and stated that Hancock "proves that he remains an immense creative force when he's set a decent challenge."

Ron Wynn of Jazz Times commented: "Carrington... knows that nothing's done more to kill jazz's viability among younger people than stuffiness, so she tries to keep things loose without sacrificing improvisational quality... Fully aware of her abilities, she's more concerned with moving the music ahead and expanding her audience and focus than in reasserting her credentials via a string of frenetic solos."

Billboard's Steven Graybow stated that the album "builds its foundation upon Carrington's notion of jazz as a creative spirit, ripe with a sense of history, that guides and nurtures music and, in the larger sense, life itself."

Writing for All About Jazz, David Adler called the album a "forceful and well-paced record," while AAJ's C. Michael Bailey described it as "a hip, high profile offering," commenting: "Ms. Carrington, for her part, is a great rhythm master, equal parts intellectual Max Roach and physical Art Blakey, all filtered through the 1990s." In a separate AAJ review, Jim Santella wrote: "Put this one at the top of your 'best of' list for the year."

Jeff Melton of Exposé Online remarked: "it is works such as this that keep the jazz tradition alive and well in the United States and abroad."

== Track listing ==
1. "Jazz Is" (Terri Lyne Carrington) – 2:29
2. "Little Jump" (Lars Danielsson) – 7:39
3. "The Corner" (Terri Lyne Carrington) – 7:04
4. "Lost Star" (Terri Lyne Carrington) – 4:11
5. "Samsara (For Wayne)" (Terri Lyne Carrington) – 7:24
6. "Journey Agent" (Terri Lyne Carrington) – 1:32
7. "Journey East From West" (Terri Lyne Carrington) – 0:49
8. "Journey of Now" (Bob Hurst, Terri Lyne Carrington) – 4:13
9. "Giggles" (Terri Lyne Carrington) – 6:13
10. "Middle Way" (Terri Lyne Carrington) – 6:56
11. "Princess" (Niels Lan Doky, Terri Lyne Carrington) – 5:31
12. "Witch Hunt" (Wayne Shorter) – 3:02
13. "Mr. Jo Jones" (Terri Lyne Carrington) – 2:24
14. "Jazz Is a Spirit" (Terri Lyne Carrington) – 3:44

== Personnel ==
- Terri Lyne Carrington – drums
- Gary Thomas – tenor saxophone (tracks 2–5, 9–12), flute (track 3)
- Katisse Buckingham – soprano saxophone (track 3)
- Terence Blanchard – trumpet (track 10)
- Wallace Roney – trumpet (tracks 2, 7, 8, 14)
- Herbie Hancock – piano (tracks 2, 5, 10)
- Greg Kurstin – keyboards (tracks: 1, 3, 4, 7–9, 12, 14)
- Paul Bollenback – guitar (tracks 2–4, 9, 11)
- Kevin Eubanks – guitar (tracks 5, 7)
- Jeff Richman – guitar (tracks 8, 12)
- Danny Robinson – guitar (tracks 1, 14)
- Bob Hurst – bass (tracks 2–5, 7–12)
- Malcolm-Jamal Warner – bass, voice (tracks 1, 14)
- Ed Barguiarena – percussion (tracks 1, 7, 14)
- Darryl "Munyungo"Jackson – percussion (tracks 3, 8, 14)
- Wren T. Brown – spoken introduction (track 2)
- Papa Jo Jones – voice (track 13)
