= Every Road I Walked =

Studio album by Grace Kelly
- Released: December 1, 2006
- Genre: Jazz
- Label: PAZZ Productions

Grace Kelly chronology
Times Too (2005)	Every Road I Walked (2006)	GRACEfulLEE (2008)

Every Road I Walked is an album by American jazz saxophonist and vocalist Grace Kelly.

It was released on December 1, 2006, and features three award-winning songs:

- "Every Road I Walked" – 2007 ASCAP Young Jazz Composers Award and 2007 International Songwriting Competition Award
- "Filosophical Flying Fish" – 2006 ISC Award
- "Summertime" – Downbeat Magazine 2006 Student Music Award for Arrangement.

== Track listing ==
1. "Every Road I Walked" – 5:37
2. "I’ll Remember April" – 5:10
3. "East of the Sun (West of the Moon)" – 5:12
4. "Some Other Time" – 4:58
5. "I Will" – 4:13
6. "Nowhere to Run" – 4:53
7. "'Round Midnight" – 6:43
8. "Filosophial Flying Fish" – 3:58
9. "Samba de Verao (So Nice)" – 4:05
10. "Somewhere Over the Rainbow" – 4:19
11. "Here's to That Rainy Day" – 4:49
12. "Finish Line" – 4:49
13. "What If I Told You" – 4:29
14. "Summertime" – 6:38

== Personnel ==
- Grace Kelly – Vocals, alto saxophone, soprano saxophone
- Doug Johnson – Piano
- John Lockwood – Bass
- Terri Lyne Carrington – Drums

Special guests

- Christian Scott – Trumpet
- Adam Larrabee – Guitar
- Rick McLaughlin – Bass
- Jordan Perlson – Drums

== Reviews ==
- http://allmusic.com/album/every-road-i-walked-r1028386
- Positive https://www.allaboutjazz.com/every-road-i-walked-grace-kelly-self-produced-review-by-dan-mcclenaghan

Receiving a 3 1/2 * review in All About Jazz and Jazz Times
