= Structure (Terri Lyne Carrington, Jimmy Haslip, Greg Osby, and Adam Rogers album) =

2004 album

Studio album by Terri Lyne Carrington, Adam Rogers, Jimmy Haslip, and Greg Osby
- Released: 2004
- Recorded: November 2003
- Studio: Castle Oaks Studio, Calabasas, California
- Genre: Jazz
- Length: 59:29
- Label: ACT; 9427-2
- Producer: Jimmy Haslip, Terri Lyne Carrington

Terri Lyne Carrington chronology
Jazz Is a Spirit (2002)	Structure (2004)	More to Say (Real Life Story: NextGen) (2009)

Structure is an album by drummer Terri Lyne Carrington on which she is joined by guitarist Adam Rogers, bassist Jimmy Haslip, and saxophonist Greg Osby. It was recorded at Castle Oaks Studio in Calabasas, California during November 2003, and was released in 2004 by the German label ACT Music.

== Reception ==
Professional ratings
Review scores
Source	Rating
AllMusic	3.5/5 stars
The Penguin Guide to Jazz	4/4 stars
The Guardian	4/5 stars
All About Jazz	4/5 stars

In a review for AllMusic, Scott Yanow wrote: "Whether it be overt funky pieces, brooding ballads or the well-titled 'Fire,' the music is explorative, unpredictable and usually grooving. Well worth exploring by fans of creative funk/jazz."

The authors of The Penguin Guide to Jazz Recordings awarded the album a full 4 stars, and stated: "If it wasn't the classic she has in her, Structure comes close... No waste, nothing crowded – an outstanding example of modern jazz."

Writing for The Guardian, John Fordham called the album an "intelligent, economical quartet set," and commented: "A few longueurs and one or two uneventful tunes, but mostly very impressive."

Russ Musto of All About Jazz described the album as Carrington's "most focused and cohesive effort to date," and remarked that it "may not be what fans of her hard bop or funk-driven projects would expect, but the music is bound to please discerning listeners." He stated: "Structure is an atypical fusion date, combining elements of early ECM and M-BASE music into a heady concoction that is both physically and mentally stimulating." AAJ's John Kelman noted: "With the kind of interpretive ability and broad musical view that has made her an in-demand player... Carrington flexes her musical muscle to a greater degree on Structure than on her previous two recordings... it's really a collective effort, with everyone playing at the top of their game... Structure ultimately proves that it's possible to bring together a group of players who have not played together previously and make some real magic."

In an article for Jazz Times, Ron Wynn wrote: "Structure's music is geared as much, if not more, toward group interaction than monster solos, and the foursome lays down some wicked riffs grooves and delivers marvelous unison sections."

== Track listing ==
1. "Mindful Intent" (Terri Lyne Carrington) – 5:31
2. "Black Halo" (Greg Osby) – 6:25
3. "Ethiopia" (Joni Mitchell) – 6:18
4. "The Invisible" (Adam Rogers) – 6:22
5. "Spiral" (Jimmy Haslip) – 6:22
6. "Facets Squared" (Greg Osby) – 4:30
7. "Solace" (Terri Lyne Carrington) – 5:22
8. "Fire" (Ed Barguiarena, Terri Lyne Carrington) – 8:31
9. "Omega" (Jimmy Haslip) – 5:19
10. "Columbus, Ohio" (Adam Rogers) – 4:47

== Personnel ==
- Terri Lyne Carrington – drums, percussion, vocals
- Adam Rogers – acoustic guitar, electric guitar
- Jimmy Haslip – bass
- Greg Osby – alto saxophone
