= Douglas Johnstone =

Douglas Johnstone may refer to:

- Doug Johnstone (born 1970), writer and musician
- Dougie Johnstone (born 1969), footballer

== See also ==
- Douglas Johnston (disambiguation)
- Douglas Johnson (disambiguation)
