= Douglas Johnston =

Douglas Johnston may refer to:

- Douglas Johnston, Lord Johnston (1907–1985), Scottish politician and judge
- Douglas H. Johnston (1856–1939), governor of the Chickasaw Nation
- Douglas M. Johnston, Scottish-born academic and author
- Doug Johnston, curler, see 2012 The Dominion Tankard

== See also ==
- Douglas Johnstone (disambiguation)
- Douglas Johnson (disambiguation)
