= Tineke Postma =

Dutch jazz saxophonist (born 1978)

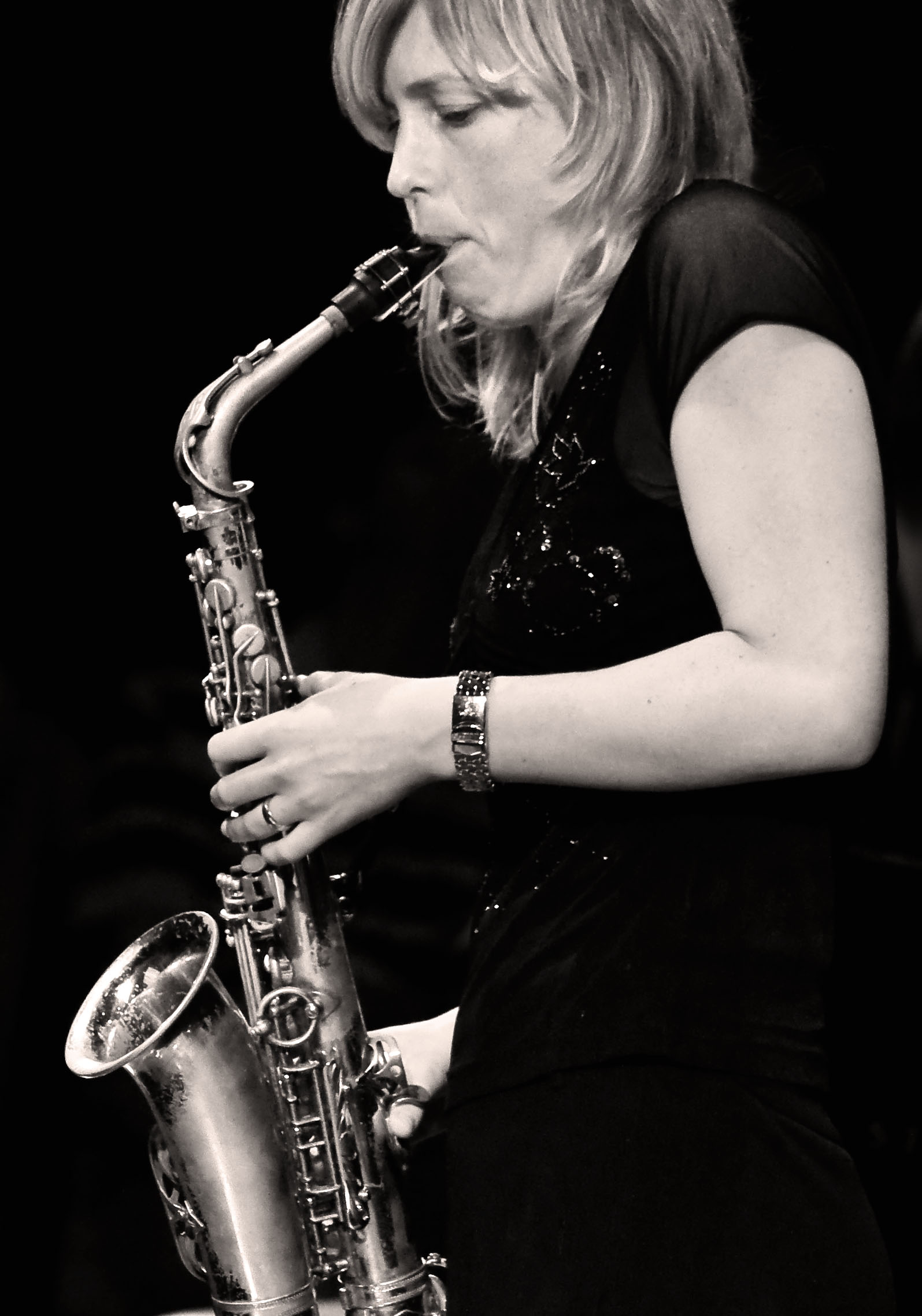

Background information
- Born: 31 August 1978 (age 47); Heerenveen, Netherlands
- Genres: Jazz
- Occupation: Musician
- Instrument: Saxophone
- Years active: 1989–present
- Website: tinekepostma.com

Tineke Postma (born August 31, 1978) is a Dutch jazz saxophonist and composer.

Saxophonist and composer Tineke Postma was named a rising star for soprano saxophone in DownBeat’s 2019 critics poll. She tours internationally as a leader and side person and has released seven albums as a leader, receiving great critical acclaim internationally. Postma also has appeared on numerous albums as a guest soloist. Her latest album of original compositions, Freya, was released in 2020 and featured Ralph Alessi, Kris Davis, Matt Brewer, and Dan Weiss.

== Career ==
At the age of eleven, Postma began playing the saxophone. She studied at the Amsterdam Conservatory and Manhattan School of Music between 1996 and 2003 and obtained a master's degree in music. Her teachers included David Liebman, Dick Oatts, and Chris Potter. In 2005, she began teaching at the Amsterdam Conservatory and is part of the saxophone faculty at Codarts Conservatory Rotterdam.

Postma worked with Terri Lyne Carrington on the Grammy Award winning album The Mosaic Project in 2011. She has performed with Greg Osby, Geri Allen, Ivan Paduart, Esperanza Spalding, and the Metropole Orchestra. In 2019, Postma was named Rising Star for Soprano Saxophone in DownBeat magazine's Critics Poll.

== Discography ==
- For the Rhythm (Munich, 2005)
- A Journey That Matters (Foreign Media, 2007)
- The Traveller (Etcetera, 2009)
- The Dawn of Light (Challenge, 2011)
- Le Peuple Des Silencieux (W.E.R.F., 2014)
- Sonic Halo (Challenge, 2014)
- We Will Really Meet Again with Nathalie Loriers, Nicolas Thys (W.E.R.F., 2016)
- Freya (Edition, 2020)
- Aria (Edition, 2023)
- Voya (Clap Your Hands, 2025)
