= Money Jungle: Provocative in Blue =

Studio album by Terri Lyne Carrington
- Released: February 25, 2013
- Genre: Jazz
- Label: Concord Jazz

Terri Lyne Carrington chronology
The Mosaic Project (2011)	Money Jungle: Provocative in Blue (2013)	The Mosaic Project: Love and Soul (2015)

Money Jungle: Provocative in Blue is an album by Terri Lyne Carrington. It was released by Concord Jazz. It won the 2013 Grammy Award for Best Jazz Instrumental Album.

== Recording and music ==
Drummer Terri Lyne Carrington's album is based on Money Jungle, a recording by pianist Duke Ellington with double bassist Charles Mingus and drummer Max Roach, which was released in 1963. Her core trio for the recording included pianist Gerald Clayton and bassist Christian McBride. Carrington said that she did not realize that her recording was made fifty years after Money Jungle, and that she had made the decision to do it about half a dozen years earlier.

All but three of the tracks were written by Ellington. Carrington's "Grass Roots" is a blues, her "No Boxes (Nor Words)" is a post-bop piece, while Clayton's ballad "Cut Off" alludes to Ellington's "Solitude". On "Rem Blues/Music", Shea Rose and Herbie Hancock read Ellington's poem "Music".

== Release and reception ==
Professional ratings
Review scores
Source	Rating
AllMusic	5/5 stars
Down Beat	3/5 stars
The Guardian	4/5 stars

Money Jungle: Provocative in Blue was released by Concord Jazz on February 25, 2013. It won the 2013 Grammy Award for Best Jazz Instrumental Album.

The Down Beat reviewer wrote that the presence of guests reduced the focus of the album, and commented that the trio tracks were more successful. The JazzTimes reviewer criticized as obvious the use of "money-themed sound bites by present and former presidents", but described the album as a whole as "wholly engrossing". For AllMusic's Thom Jurek, the spoken sound bites were "an artistic, musical indictment of the pervasive corruption in Western capitalism"; he praised Carrington because she "reveals the pervasive nature [of] the blues in the original album's compositions and intent, and underscores how their importance resonates in jazz's present tense".

== Track listing ==
All tracks were written by Duke Ellington, except where noted.

1. "Money Jungle" – 6:21
2. "Fleurette Africain" – 5:56
3. "Backward Country Boy Blues" – 6:00
4. "Very Special" – 4:11
5. "Wig Wise" – 6:17
6. "Grass Roots" (Terri Lyne Carrington) – 4:38
7. "No Boxes (Nor Words)" (Carrington) – 5:37
8. "A Little Max (Parfait)" – 5:01
9. "Switch Blade" – 6:28
10. "Cut Off" (Gerald Clayton) – 5:08
11. "Rem Blues/Music" – 6:44

== Personnel ==
- Terri Lyne Carrington – drums
- Gerald Clayton – piano
- Christian McBride – bass
- Clark Terry – trumpet, vocals (track 2)
- Robin Eubanks – trombone (tracks 2, 9)
- Antonio Hart – flute (tracks 2, 9)
- Tia Fuller – flute (track 2), alto saxophone (track 9)
- Nir Felder – guitar (track 3)
- Arturo Stable – percussion (track 8)
- Lizz Wright – vocals (track 3)
- Shea Rose – vocals (track 11)
- Herbie Hancock – vocals (track 11)
