= Shea Rose =

American singer-songwriter

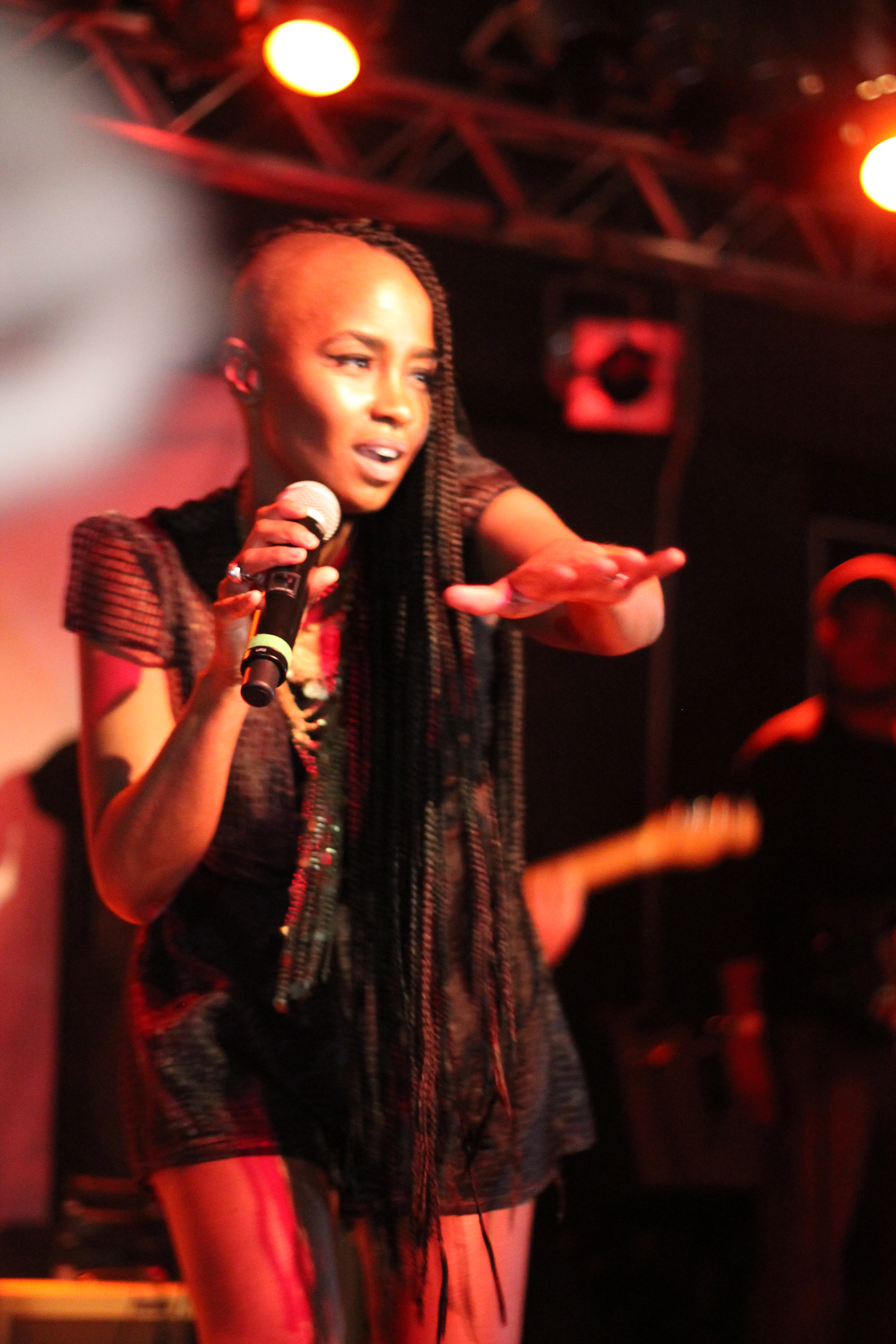
- Shea Rose performing at Brighton Music Hall in Boston, MA

Background information
- Born: Boston, Massachusetts, United States
- Genres: Singer-songwriter, soul, rock, hip hop, folk
- Instruments: Voice, guitar, piano
- Years active: 2010–present
- Label: Independent
- Website: shearose.com

Shea Rose is a singer-songwriter, performing artist, and music curator based in Boston, Massachusetts. She explores soul, rock, and hip hop while congruently inspiring her community to use the power of music for social change.

== Music career ==
Rose has been described by former Boston Globe music critic Steve Morse as "that rare artist who can bridge diverse styles such as soul, funk, rock, rap and jazz – and bring her unique stamp to each." She has been labeled the "artist most likely to make an impact on the national stage" by the Boston Globe. In addition to her independent releases, Rose is a featured songwriter and performer on two Grammy award-winning jazz albums, The Mosaic Project (2011) and Money Jungle: Provocative in Blue (2012), both produced by drummer Terri Lyne Carrington and featuring a cast of musicians including Esperanza Spalding, Patrice Rushen, and Herbie Hancock. Rose received a SESAC National Performance Activity Award for her collaboration on "The Mosaic Project".

Rose has shared the stage with Gladys Knight, Macy Gray, Nneka, Alice Smith, and Talib Kweli, and she has performed internationally in Bucharest, Romania, Athens, Greece, Naples, Italy, St. Michaels, Barbados, Santiago/Havana, Cuba and Kingston, Jamaica.

Rose graduated from Berklee College of Music in 2011 and has received numerous awards and honors since, including multiple Boston Music Awards and a scholarship from the Songwriters Hall of Fame for "excellence in songwriting."

=== D.T.M.A. (Dance This Mess Around) - 2017 ===
In 2017, Rose released the D.T.M.A. (Dance This Mess Around) EP. Rose recorded and produced the album independently with funding from a Kickstarter before being offered a contract by Virgin Records, and before turning it down. The album, which was released one track at a time with accompanying artwork and behind-the-scenes interviews, follows Rose's personal and creative evolution during this journey. The songs describe a struggle with the conformity that often accompanies mainstream success and a desire for freedom and self-expression. She's Got Her Ticket describes Rose's transition "from the tough star with her eyes on success, to a stripped-down confident woman who has found herself."

The accompanying D.T.M.A. interviews reveal a behind the scenes look at the EP, depicting the challenges and effort that went into making it, as well as the process and Rose's personal experiences while creating this project.

=== "Black Boys On Mopeds" – 2016 ===
In the summer of 2016, Rose released a cover of Sinéad O’Connor's "Black Boys on Mopeds," available on iTunes, Spotify, and Bandcamp. Though the lyrics reference England in the 1990s, Rose felt that the song served as a universal statement on the social and political climate of the world in 2016. The song came to mind after the shooting and unrest in Ferguson. As more and more stories of police brutality came out, Rose was hesitant to release her recording, fearing it could be taken the wrong way. As the song goes, "To say what you feel is to dig your own grave." But following the shootings of Alton Sterling and Philando Castile, and with a Presidential election coming that year, Rose chose to use her platform to spark a conversation about the disquieting conditions across the world.

Together with producer Simone Scazzocchio, Rose presented this song not as a musical performance, but as a conversation with the community. This conversation took place through social media on both Facebook Live and a Twitter live chat, as well as in person at community meetings and listening parties.

=== Little Warrior – 2011 ===
“Little Warrior" is not only the title of her album, but a moniker that Shea Rose embodies physically and artistically. Rose expresses the "Little Warrior" on stage, through her music and fashion sense, and in her daily life with her music for social change initiatives and outreach. She describes a "Little Warrior" as:

Little Warrior: (noun) An Empowered, Independent, Tenacious, and Resilient Woman; A Citizen of the World, Zealous in nature, who uses Amity and Strength as her weapons of choice when presented with any battle.

In the summer of 2015, Rose launched her "Warrior Wednesday" campaign, where she interviewed several "Warrior Women" in the Boston area to share their words of wisdom to other young women. Featured guests included Boston City Councilor Ayanna Pressley and Editor and Chief of Boston Common Magazine Lisa Pierpont. One video was shared every Wednesday on Rose's YouTube and social media pages.

=== Rock 'n Rose – 2010 ===
Rock ‘n Rose, Shea Rose's first EP (2010), was an introduction to her genre-blending style. At that time, Rose was known for her soulful rap-meets-rock sound, a big Afro, and killer heels. Her image was a fearless rapper with a rock-edge, but that was only one side of her. Rose's image has evolved greatly since this EP, as revealed through her more recent releases.

== Other activities ==
=== Community Outreach ===
Off stage, Rose is dedicated to working with local and national communities to promote music for social change. Her outreach includes volunteering, live and in-studio performances, coaching, workshops, lectures, and clinics. She has worked with over 30 community organizations and served as an AmeriCorps State and National program volunteer for two years. Rose is the recipient of the Berklee College of Music, Walter W. Harp Liberal Arts Music and Society Award for her demonstration of outstanding achievement in research, civic engagement, and performance relating to music and society. She's an "Artist for the Amazon," representing the Amazon Aid Foundation, and co-wrote their call-to-action song, "Anthem for the Amazon," to raise awareness about the environmental issues in the rainforest. She is also an artist representative for Music2Life, a non-profit foundation started by Noel Paul Stookey of Peter, Paul and Mary, and partners with the Safer is S.E.X.Y. campaign, spreading HIV awareness among teenage girls in underserved communities.

=== Fashion ===
Rose was named one of the "Most Stylish Bostonians," gracing the cover of Boston Globe magazine's annual style issue, and has also appeared on the covers of Improper Bostonian, Exhale and Performer magazines. She's been featured in brand campaigns for CoverGirl, Tory Burch, Puma, Plndr and Converse, and she made her international television debut hosting the "Boston Contemporary" episode of CNN's travel and lifestyle show, "CNNGo.”

=== TEDx Talk ===
Rose was chosen as a speaker for TEDx Beacon Street in the fall of 2014. Her talk, entitled "Somebody Stole My Voice Again," addressed her experience following vocal surgery to remove a polyp:

The voice has been described as the “muscle of the soul”. Then why do most of us cringe at the sound of hearing our own voice? Through personal stories and singing, Shea Rose, a two-time Boston Music Award winner and Berklee College of Music graduate, shares what she discovered about the human voice, after a major surgery on her vocal cords.

The full talk is available to view on YouTube.

=== Isabella Stewart Gardner Museum RISE Series ===
Currently, Rose is curating the RISE Music Series at the Isabella Stewart Gardner Museum in Boston with Composer/Producer Simone Scazzocchio. RISE features local, national, and international aspiring and established artists from the realms of pop, rock, and hip-hop. Since September 2015, Rose and Scazzocchio have brought artists including KING, Yuna, Will Dailey, and Goapele to the museum's performance space and sonic cube, Calderwood Hall.

== Awards and nominations ==
- 2016: Boston Music Awards Nominee, R&B Artist of the Year
- 2015: Boston Music Awards Nominee, R&B Artist of the Year, Pop Artist of the Year
- 2014: Boston Music Awards Nominee, Pop/R&B Artist of the Year
- 2013: Boston Music Awards Nominee, Female Vocalist of the Year
- 2012: Boston Music Awards Winner, Artist of the Year, Pop/R&B
- 2012: SESAC Award for collaboration on Grammy Winning Jazz Album, "The Mosaic Project"
- 2012: Songwriters Hall of Fame Abe Olman Scholarship Award recipient for ‘Excellence in Songwriting’
- 2012: Red Bull Soundstage/Universal Music Group featured artist and fan-driven contest winner, featured at SXSW
- 2011: Boston Music Awards Winner, Artist of the Year, R&B/Soul/Urban Contemporary
- 2010: Chosen by Queen Latifah as spokesmodel for CoverGirl Ignite Your Persona campaign

== Discography ==
=== Independent Releases ===
- 2017 D.T.M.A. (Dance This Mess Around) (EP)
- 2016 "Black Boys On Mopeds" (single)
- 2011 Little Warrior (mixtape)
- 2010 Rock 'n Rose (EP)

=== Collaborations ===
- Terri Lyne Carrington – Money Jungle: Provocative in Blue (Concord Jazz, 2013) Grammy Winner
- Terri Lyne Carrington – The Mosaic Project (Concord Jazz, 2011) Grammy Winner
