= Elio Villafranca =

Cuban-American Jazz pianist

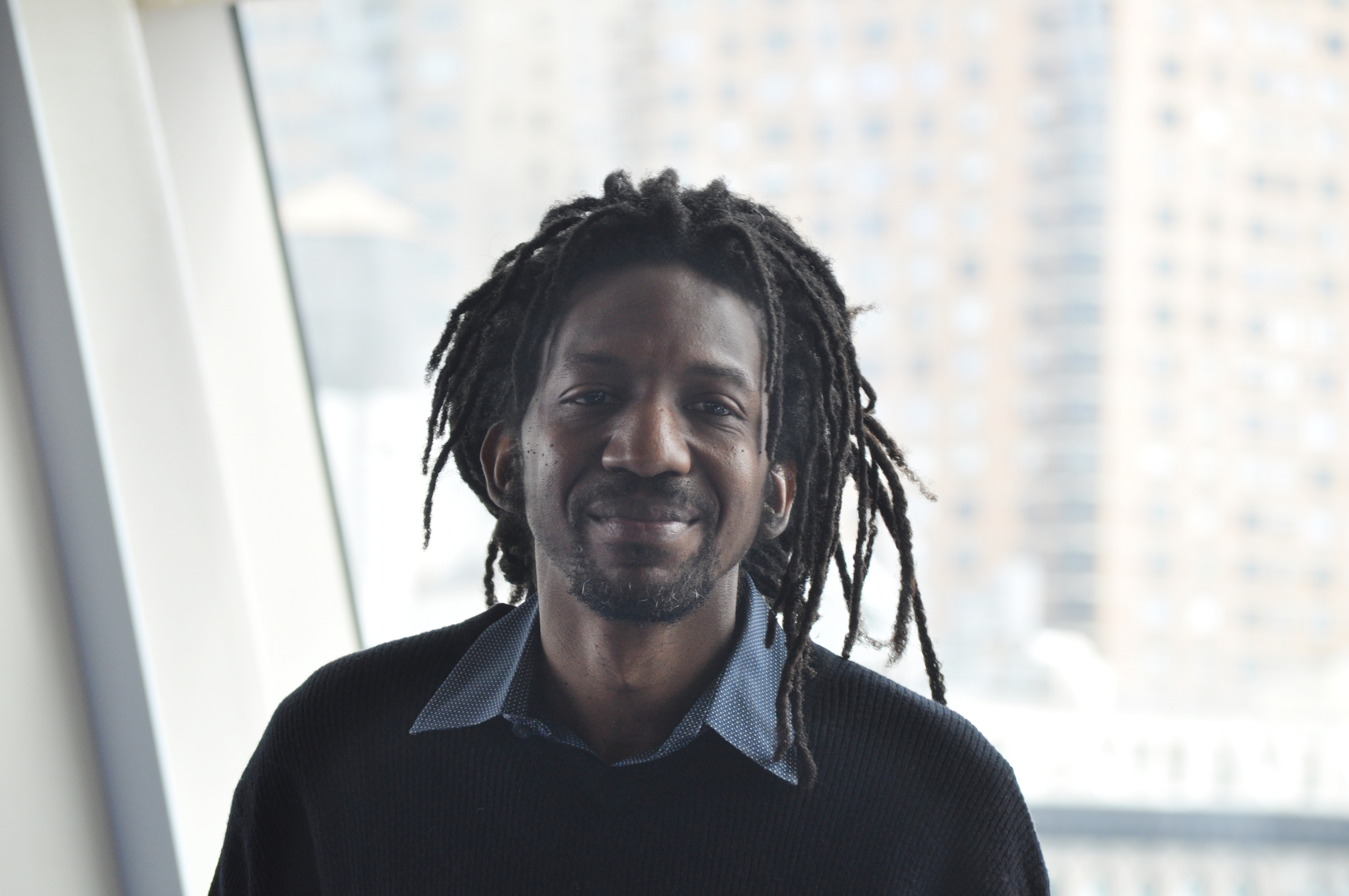
- Born: Pinar del Río, Cuba
- Occupation: Jazz musician
- Years active: 1990s - Present
- Website: eliovillafranca.com

Elio Villafranca is a Cuban jazz pianist and composer. He was born in the Cuban province of Pinar del Río, and studied in the faculty of music of the Instituto Superior de Arte in Havana. He worked on Things I Wanted to do by Chembo Corniel, which was nominated for Best Latin Jazz Album at the 2010 Grammy Awards; his album Cinque was nominated in 2020. In 2014 he received the first JALC Millennium Swing Award. He teaches at the Manhattan School of Music, at Temple University, and at the Juilliard School of Music, where he specializes in jazz ensemble.

He has received awards including the 2017 Sunshine Award, the 2018 Downbeat Critic's Poll "Rising Stars Keyboard" and the 2019 Downbeat Critic's Poll "Rising Stars Pianist". In 2021 he received a Guggenheim Fellowship in music composition.

== Discography ==
As Leader

- 2003 – Incantations/Encantaciones – 50 best jazz albums of the year by JazzTimes Magazine (Universal Latin) Feat: Pat Martino-guitar, Terell Stafford – trumpet, Jane Bunnett – sax/flute, Dafnis Prieto – drums, Carlos Henriquez – bass, Pedrito Martines – percussion/vocals, Chembo Corniel – percussion.
- 2007 – The Source in Between – Top 10 of the JazzWeek World Top 50 Chart for eleven weeks. (Ceiba Tree Music) Feat: Eric Alexander – tenor sax, Dafnis Prieto – dr., Ferenc Nemeth, dr., Jeff Carnet – bass, Yosvany Terry – alto sax, Arturo Stable – percussion.
- 2011 – Dynamic Resolution Elio Villafranca Special guest Charles Flores (Produced by Ceiba Tree Music and 16 Eyes Records, and distributed by Acoustic Sounds). 180gram Audiophile LP and CD
- 2012 – Dos y Mas – Elio Villafranca with Arturo Stable (Motema Music)
- 2012 – Elio Villafranca & The Jass Syncopators – Flower by the Dry River (Produced and distributed by Elusive Disc and Direct Grace Records) A Double 33RPM LPs album. Feat. drummer Victor Lewis, saxophonists Vincent Herring, JD Allen, trumpet Bruce Harris, bassist Gregg August, and Los Pleneros de la 21.
- 2014 – Elio Villafranca & The Jass Syncopators – Caribbean Tinge, Live a Dizzy’s Club CocaCola (Motema Music)
- 2014 – Old Waters, New River. Elio Villafranca/Spiros Exaras (Harbinger Records)
- 2018 – Cinque – featuring Wynton Marsalis, Vincent Herring, Freddie Hendrix, Greg Tardy, Lewis Nash, and Steve Turre
