= Doug Johnson (Australian footballer) =

Australian rules footballer

Personal information
- Full name: Douglas Clarence Johnson
- Born: 2 December 1920; Werribee, Victoria
- Died: 19 October 2000 (aged 79)
- Original team: Brunswick
- Height: 175 cm (5 ft 9 in)
- Weight: 66 kg (146 lb)

Playing career^{1}
Years	Club	Games (Goals)
1948–49	North Melbourne	20 (3)
- ^{1} Playing statistics correct to the end of 1949.

Douglas Clarence Johnson (2 December 1920 – 19 October 2000) was an Australian rules footballer who played with North Melbourne in the Victorian Football League (VFL).
