= Grace Kelly (musician) =

American jazz musician

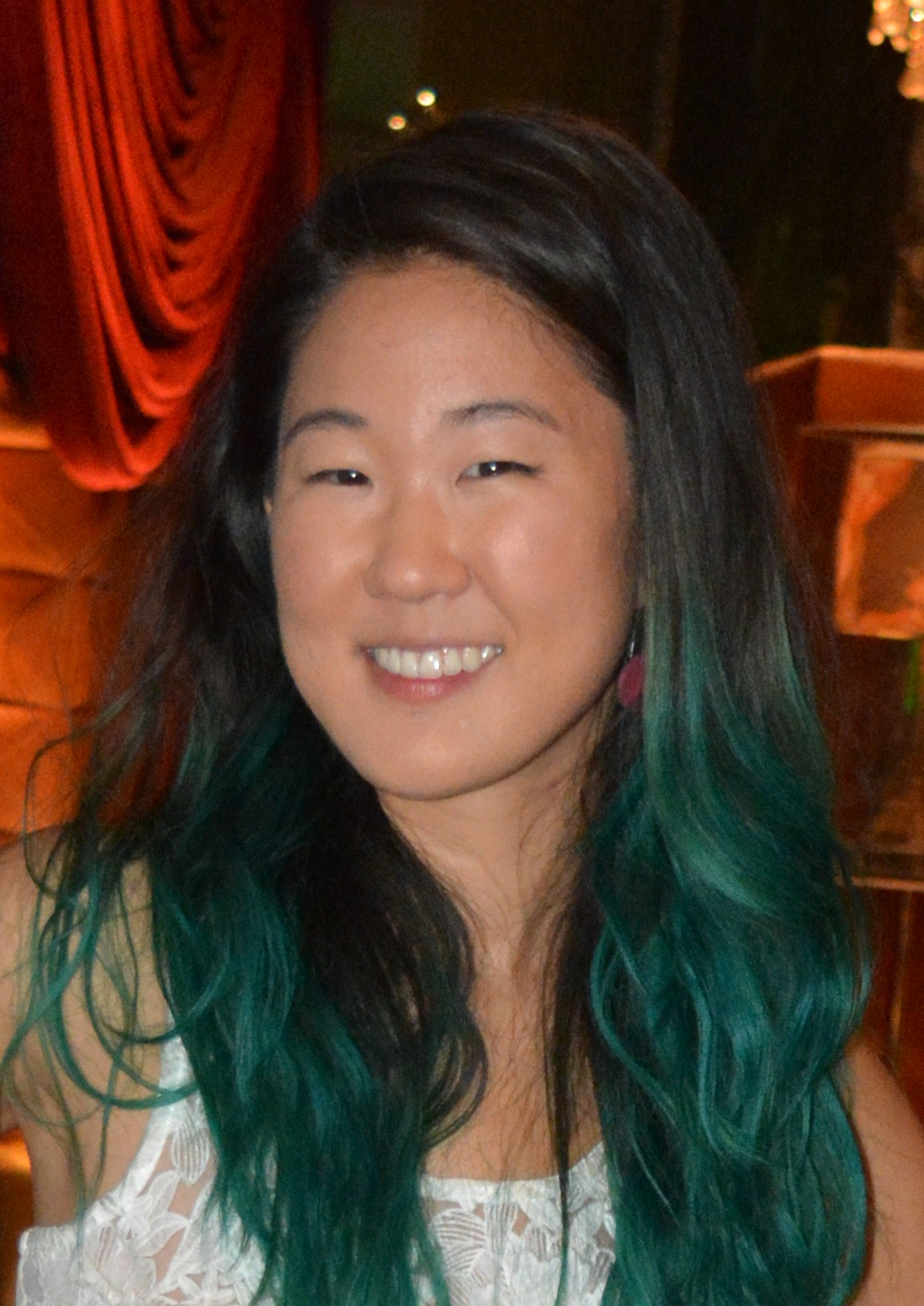
- Kelly in 2015

Background information
- Born: Grace Chung; May 15, 1992 (age 34); Wellesley, Massachusetts, U.S.
- Origin: Boston, Massachusetts, U.S.
- Genre: Jazz
- Occupations: Musician, composer, arranger, educator
- Instruments: Saxophone, vocals, EWI
- Years active: 2004–present
- Label: PAZZ Productions
- Website: gracekellymusic.com

Grace Kelly (born Grace Chung; May 15, 1992) is an American jazz musician, composer, and arranger. Kelly has produced and released recordings of her own, scored soundtracks, and tours with her band. She was named one of Glamour magazine's Top 10 College Women in 2011;, she has been featured on CNN.com and on the NPR radio shows Piano Jazz with both Marian McPartland and Jon Weber, as well as on WBGO's JazzSet with Dee Dee Bridgewater.

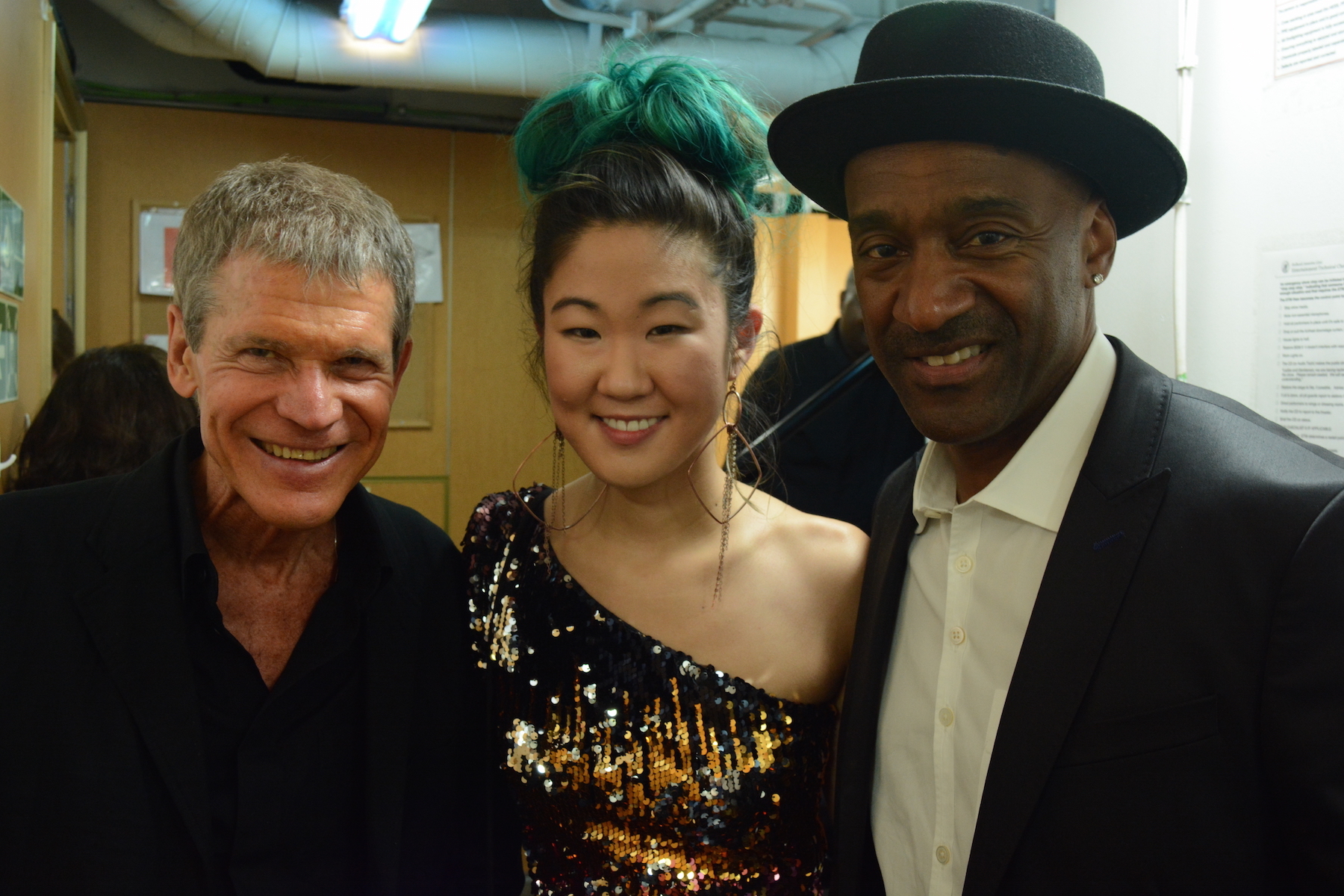
David Sanborn, Grace Kelly and Marcus Miller

Working professionally since she was a preteen, Kelly was dubbed a prodigy in the jazz world. In 2014, she worked with the producer Stewart Levine on her EP, Working for the Dreamers, which was released in September of that year.

Kelly was featured in the December 2015 issue of Vanity Fair as a significant millennial in the jazz world. She was also named "Rising Star – Alto Saxophone" in DownBeat's 2016 Critics Poll. Her Trying to Figure It Out (2016 PAZZ) release was voted the number-two Jazz Album of the Year in the 2016 DownBeat readers' poll.

== Early life and education ==
Born Grace Chung in Wellesley, Massachusetts, to Korean parents, she moved to Brookline, Massachusetts, when she was 2 years old. She briefly played clarinet and classical piano before finding her voice on the saxophone. Kelly stated, "Saxophone reminds me of the human voice. And I always felt this very compelling, this feeling, that someone was singing to me. The Girl from Ipanema was on repeat in my household when I was a little girl and thought: ‘I wanna learn this one day.’ It’s one of the instruments that’s closest to expressing the human voice.”

Her mother remarried in 1997 to Robert Kelly, who legally adopted Grace a few years later, thus changing her name to Grace Kelly. Kelly wrote her first song "On My Way Home" at age seven. Kelly counts it a major breakthrough in her career when singer/songwriter Fred Taylor approached her after she sat in with vocalist Ann Hampton Callaway at Scullers Jazz Club. He offered to book her first headlining show at a major jazz venue.

Kelly left Brookline High School at age 16 and earned her GED. After studying in the Jazz Department of New England Conservatory of Music's School of Preparatory Education, she enrolled at Berklee College of Music, where she graduated in December 2011 with a Bachelor of Arts in professional music at age 19. Kelly has studied saxophone with Jeremy Udden, James Merenda, George Garzone, Lee Konitz, Greg Osby, Jerry Bergonzi, and Allan Chase.

== Career ==
On March 15, 2005, when she was just 12, Kelly released her first CD, Dreaming. While in the recording stages, she met Ann Hampton Callaway, a jazz cabaret singer, who offered to write the liner notes to Kelly's first CD. Grace won numerous ASCAP Young Jazz Composer Awards. Grace previously won the "Jazz Artist of the Year" for the third time at the 2016 Boston Music Awards' which she had won previously in 2008 and 2010. Kelly was also voted alto saxophonist of the year by the 2016 NYC Jazz Fans Decision Award.

=== Touring ===
In 2009, she played with the Foxboro High School Jazz Ensemble and Dave Brubeck for the "Let Freedom Swing/Celebration Of America" concert held at the John F. Kennedy Center for the Performing Arts.

That same year, Kelly was selected by the Boston Celtics to play the national anthem at the TD Garden for preseason and play-off games.

For the Kennedy Center's 15th Annual Mary Lou Williams Women in Jazz Festival, in 2010, Kelly performed as part of an all-star quintet of Dee Dee Bridgewater, Geri Allen, Terri Lyne Carrington, and Esperanza Spalding for a set that celebrated the 100th anniversary of Mary Lou Williams's birth.

In 2012, Kelly was selected to perform at the 30th Annual NEA Jazz Masters Ceremony with Phil Woods and Wynton Marsalis and the Jazz at Lincoln Center Orchestra.

=== Collaborations ===
At 15, Kelly and NEA jazz master Lee Konitz recorded the album, GRACEfulLEE. The album gained a 4 1/2-star review from DownBeat.

At 18, she released her sixth album, Man with the Hat, recorded as a collaboration with another NEA jazz master Phil Woods. The title of the album honors Woods, who has had a signature leather cap as his trademark since 1976. The title of the album also refers to when Woods invited Kelly, when she was 14 years old, on stage during one of his performances and presented her with his iconic leather cap as a gift after her solo on "I'll Remember April".

In 2017, when she recorded Go Time: Brooklyn 2, Kelly had Leo Pellegrino as a guest. On November 30, 2019, Pellegrino and Kelly announced the official formation of a new "group, a band... a collaboration" called 2SAXY, which would consist of a duet between Kelly on alto saxophone and Pellegrino on baritone saxophone.

=== Charting ===
Kelly's 2013 single "Sweet Sweet Baby", recorded for the Woodward Avenue Records label, reached number 7 on the Billboard Smooth Jazz Singles chart. The track was also included on the label's 9 Mile Road compilation.

=== Film and television ===
Kelly is a featured performer in the 2014 documentary Sound of Redemption: The Frank Morgan Story, co-produced by author Michael Connelly and directed by N.C. Heikin. In the documentary, she performs "Somewhere Over the Rainbow" as part of a tribute concert held in San Quentin State Prison, where Frank Morgan was incarcerated at different times in his life. The documentary had its world premiere at the Los Angeles Film Festival on June 14, 2014 and was followed the next day by a tribute concert at the Grammy Museum, featuring Kelly, George Cables, Ron Carter, Mark Gross, and Roy McCurdy. The documentary was selected for multiple additional film festivals, including the 2014 Hot Springs Documentary Film Festival, the 2014 Maine International Film Festival, the 2014 Virginia Film Festival, the 2014 Atlanta Film Festival, the 2015 Palm Springs International Film Festival, and the 2015 Vancouver International Film Festival.

Kelly has performed many times with jazz musician Jon Batiste and his band Stay Human as the house band for the New York City-based late night television show The Late Show with Stephen Colbert as well as at other New York City locations.

Kelly released her tenth CD, Trying to Figure It Out, in 2016; it includes the track "Blues For Harry Bosch", a composition written for the Amazon produced television series Bosch. In the second season, episode 2, of the series, Kelly is featured, as herself, performing "Blues For Harry Bosch" in a scene in front of main character Harry Bosch Titus Welliver and his Lieutenant Amy Aquino filmed at the Catalina Jazz Club.

Kelly was executive producer and music composer of the 2017 short film The Bird Who Could Fly, directed by Raphael Sbarge, written by Robert Munic and Raphael Sbarge. The film won multiple awards in the "Asians on Film Festival of Shorts 2016 Fall Quarter".

== Charity work ==
In partnership with Berklee College of Music, Kelly established the Fred Taylor Scholarship Fund by producing, emceeing, and performing at an all-star benefit concert at the Berklee Performance Center on September 12, 2017, raising enough funds to establish an endowed scholarship fund.

== Discography ==
=== As leader ===
- Grace Kelly With Strings: "At The Movies" (PAZZ Productions/La Reserve); Bryan Carter, Eli Bishop, Kyle Gordon
- Feels Like Home (Feat. Elliott Skinner) (2019) single (PAZZ Productions); Julian Waterfall Pollack, Julia Adamy, Ross Pederson
- GO TiME: Live In LA (2019) (PAZZ Productions); Feat. Sarah Reich, Julian Waterfall Pollack, Julia Adamy, Ross Pederson
- GO TiME: Brooklyn 2 (2018) (PAZZ Productions); Julian Waterfall Pollack, Julia Adamy, Ross Pederson
- GO TiME: Brooklyn (2018) (PAZZ Productions); Julian Waterfall Pollack, Julia Adamy, Ross Pederson
- She's The First (2016) single (PAZZ Productions) written by Grace Kelly and April Bender.
- Trying To Figure It Out (2016) (PAZZ Productions) Jon Batiste, Michael League (leader of Snarky Puppy), Mocean Worker, Shayna Steele, Henry Hey, Tim Lefebvre, Lemar Carter, Pete McCann, Ross Pederson, Jeff Babko, Steve Hass, and others.
- Working For The Dreamers (2014) (PAZZ Productions); Sunny Levine, Amir Yaghmai, Gabriel Noel
- "Sweet Sweet Baby" (2013) (single) (PAZZ Productions); Alain Mallet, Mike Bono, Duke Levine, Spencer Stewart, Eric Law, Gabe Smith, John Nellen, Vishall Nayak. The single reached #10 on Billboard Smooth Jazz Singles Chart
- Live at Scullers (2013) (PAZZ Productions); Pete McCann, Mark Walker, Jason Palmer, Zach Brown, Chantale Sterling, Jaime Woods, Eric Law
- Grace (2011) (Pazz Productions); George Russell Jr., Peter Clemente, Jamey Haddad
- Man with the Hat (2011) (PAZZ Productions); Phil Woods, Monty Alexander, Evan Gregor, Bill Goodwin, Jordan Perlson
- Mood Changes (2009) (PAZZ Productions); Terri Lyne Carrington, Jason Palmer, Doug Johnson, John Lockwood, with special guests Adam Rogers and Hal Crook
- GRACEfulLEE (2008) (PAZZ Productions); Lee Konitz, Russell Malone, Rufus Reid, Matt Wilson
- Every Road I Walked (2006) (PAZZ Productions); Terri Lyne Carrington, Doug Johnson, John Lockwood, and special guest Christian Scott
- Times Too (2005) (PAZZ Productions); Doug Johnson, John Lockwood, Yoron Israel
- Dreaming (2004) (PAZZ Productions); Doug Johnson, John Lockwood, Jordan Perlson

=== As sidewoman ===
With The Manhattan Transfer

- The Junction (2018) When asked about her personal favorite song on the new CD, Bentyne said, "I love every single song because each song represents us as a whole. We all participated in writing. So I will say, today 'Blues For Harry Bosch.' I heard this wild, wonderful; sax player, Grace Kelly on YouTube and her video for this piece was thrilling!"

With Terri Lyne Carrington

- The Mosaic Project: Love and Soul (Concord/Universal, 2015)

With Vance Gilbert

- BaD Dog Buffet (2014); Tom Eaton, Larry Luddecke, Kevin Barry, Grace Kelly, Richard Gates, Lorne Entress, Neal Eckstein, Joe Walsh, Darol Anger, Roy Sludge

With Bill Banfield's Jazz Urbane

- Playing With Other Peoples Heads: Songs (2014); Bill Banfield, Grace Kelly, Christian Scott, Greg Osby, Alex Han, Kevin Ross, Terri Lyne Carrington, Stokley Williams, George Duke, Annette Philip, Jessica Newry, Amelia Sophia Ali, Jesse Taitt, Madelyn Hawke, Lucia Paniker

With Bob Dorough

- Duets (2013); featuring New York Voices, Nellie McKay, JD Walter, Heather Masse, Val Hawk, Craig Kastelnik, Janis Siegel, Donna Antonow, Grace Kelly, Vicki Doney, Nancy Reed

With Various Artists

- A Tribute To Phil Woods (2018) Recorded live on September 8, 2016, as a guest soloist along with Bob Dorough, Houston Person, Randy Brecker, Ada Rovatti with Phil Woods Quintet and Big Band.
- Walkin’ & Swingin’ (2010); The Kennedy Center Women In Jazz Festival; Dee Dee Bridgewater, Geri Allen, Esperanza Spalding, Terri Lyne Carrington, Grace Kelly, Sherri Maricle & The Diva Jazz Orchestra, Virginia Mayhew, Anne Patterson's Maiden Voyage, Catherine Russell, Carmen Staaf
- Collaboration with The Fearless Flyers on their debut album Tailwinds (2020)

== Film credits ==
- The Bird Who Could Fly (2017) Director: Raphael Sbarge, Writers: Robert Munic and Raphael Sbarge, Executive Producer: Grace Kelly, Composer: Grace Kelly
- Bosch (2016, Season 2 Episode 2) Director: Alex Zakrzewski, Writer: Joe Gonzalez
- Starcrossed (2015) Director: Chase Mohseni; starring Mischa Barton, Eric Roberts, Grant Harvey. Musical contributions by Kelly.
- Sound of Redemption: The Frank Morgan Story (2014) Producer: James Egan; Director: NC Heikin documentary about alto saxophonist Frank Morgan (musician) and premiered at Los Angeles Film Festival in 2014. Executive produced and script by best selling novelist Michael Connelly. Interview and music performed by Kelly alongside Ron Carter, Ed Reed, George Cables, Delfeayo Marsalis, Marvin Smith, Mark Gross among others.
- Delta Rising (2009) Directors: Michael Afendakis, Laura Bernieri; a blues documentary featuring Willie Nelson, Morgan Freeman and others. Performance by Kelly.
- Guy and Madeline on a Park Bench (2009) Director: Damien Chazelle. Musical contribution by Kelly.
- Men in Green (2009) Producers: John Ippolito, Laura Bernieri (also Director); a behind-the-scenes documentary with the legends of the Boston Celtics hosted by Satch Sanders. Film score composed and performed by Kelly.

== Music videos ==
List of music videos
Song	Date released
"Sweet Sweet Baby"	November 26, 2011
"Ready Set Stay"	April 24, 2013
"Eggshells"	June 25, 2013
"Working For The Dreamers"	September 24, 2014
"Blues For Harry Bosch"	March 22, 2016
"She's The First"	November 1, 2016
"Worth It"	June 29, 2017

== Awards ==
- 2016 Winner 64th Annual Downbeat Critics Poll
