= Times Too =

Studio album by Grace Kelly
- Released: December 15, 2005
- Genre: Jazz

Grace Kelly chronology
Dreaming (2005)	Times Too (2005)	Every Road I Walked (2006)

Times Too is an album by American jazz saxophonist and vocalist Grace Kelly. It was released on December 15, 2005.

Times Too is Kelly's second release, a double disc, and features a blend between pop and jazz standards and originals. It was recorded when she was 13 years old.

== Track listing ==
Disc one

1. "Isfahan" – 4:58
2. "All the Things You Are" – 3:58
3. "Fly Me to the Moon (In Other Words)" – 4:21
4. "You Stepped Out of a Dream" – 5:09
5. "'Round Midnight" – 7:44
6. "Leave Me or Leave Me" – 3:34
7. "Fast Metabolism" – 3:38
8. "Blood Count" – 6:48

Disc two

1. "Key to the Missing Door" – 4:56
2. "Oh Darling" – 4:29
3. "Cuttin' In" – 5:05
4. "Time to Be Free" – 3:12
5. "New Found Beat" – 3:26
6. "Time to Be Free" (Instrumental) – 3:34
7. "Time Tickin' Away" – 4:13
8. "Signed, Sealed, Delivered (I'm Yours)" – 3:55

== Personnel ==
- Grace Kelly – Alto saxophone, vocals
- Doug Johnson – Piano
- John Lockwood – Bass
- Yoron Israel – Drums

Special guests

- Adam Larrabee – Guitar
- Nik Walker – Vocals
- Ron Reid – Steel drums
- Jeremy Udden – Alto saxophone

== Reviews ==
- http://allmusic.com/album/times-too-r827853/review
