= Jenny Reynolds =

American folk singer-songwriter

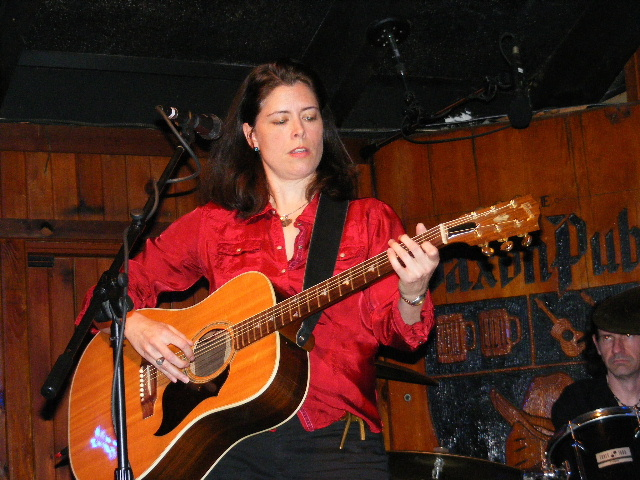
- Reynolds performing at the Saxon Pub in Austin, Texas, April 5, 2008

Background information
- Genres: Folk music
- Occupation(s): Musician, songwriter, teacher, writer
- Instrument(s): Vocals, guitar
- Years active: early 1990s–present
- Website: Official web site

Jenny Reynolds is an American folk singer-songwriter. She began her career performing at open mics in the Boston area in the early 1990s, while working as a high-school English teacher. After several years of performing, she quit teaching to pursue music full-time, though she continues to do creative writing workshops with schoolchildren. She moved to Austin, Texas in 2003, and was a Kerrville New Folk Finalist the same year.

Her song "Whisper" appeared on a Signature Sounds compilation CD titled Respond. The release, which also featured tracks by Lori McKenna, Catie Curtis, Jennifer Kimball, and others, raised money for domestic violence causes.

== Discography ==
- Colored in Poetry (1998)
- Bare (EP) (2000)
- Bet on the Wind (2003)
- Next to You (2008)
- Any Kind of Angel (2020)
