= Man with the Hat =

Man With the Hat

Studio album by Grace Kelly and Phil Woods
- Released: January 25, 2011
- Genre: Jazz
- Label: PAZZ Productions

Man with the Hat is an album by American jazz saxophonists Grace Kelly and Phil Woods. It was released on January 25, 2011. Allmusic review.

The title of the album refers to when Woods invited Kelly, when she was 14 years old, on stage during one of his performances and presented her with his iconic leather cap as a gift after her solo on "I'll Remember April".

Kelly, in tribute, wrote the title track, "Man with the Hat", in honor of Woods.

== Track listing ==
1. "Man with the Hat" (8:45)
2. "Love Song" (5:19)
3. "People Time" (6:33)
4. "Ballad for Very Sad and Very Tired Lotus Eaters" (7:00)
5. "Gone" (5:04)
6. "Everytime We Say Goodbye" (4:12)
7. "The Way You Look Tonight" (6:22)

== Personnel ==
- Grace Kelly – alto saxophone, vocals
- Phil Woods – alto saxophone
- Monty Alexander – piano, rhodes, melodica
- Evan Gregor – bass
- Bill Goodwin – drums
- Jordan Perlson – percussion (track 5)
