= Dreaming (Grace Kelly album) =

Studio album by Grace Kelly
- Released: January 1, 2005
- Genre: Jazz
- Label: PAZZ Productions

Grace Kelly chronology
Dreaming (2005)	Times Too (2005)

Dreaming is an album by the American jazz saxophonist and vocalist Grace Kelly. It was released January 1, 2005.

Dreaming is Kelly's debut studio album, recorded when she was 12 years old. It features six originals and six standards.

== Track listing ==
1. "Dreaming" - (3:09)
2. "On My Way Home" - (3:03)
3. "Smile" - (3:32)
4. "Baby, Baby" (Instrumental) - (3:38)
5. "Blue Skies/ In Walked Bud" - (3:23)
6. "Tinkerbell" - (4:19)
7. "Straighten Up and Fly Right" - (1:41)
8. "Baby, Baby" - (3:04)
9. "Can't Buy Me Love" - (4:27)
10. "G-Bop" - (4:05)
11. "Stardust" - (3:58)
12. "One By One" - (5:59)

== Personnel ==
- Grace Kelly - Vocals, Alto Saxophone
- John Lockwood- Bass
- Ken Berman - Piano (1, 2, 4, 6, 8)
- Doug Johnson - Piano (3, 5, 7, 9, 10, 11, 12)
- Guy Goodwin - Drums (1, 2, 4, 6, 8)
- Jordan Perlson - Drums (3, 5, 7, 9, 10, 11, 12)
- David Eure - Violin (2)
