= The Mosaic Project (album) =

Studio album by Terri Lyne Carrington
- Released: July 19, 2011
- Genre: R&B, jazz
- Length: 71:39
- Label: Concord Jazz
- Producer: Robert Hebert, Frank White, Terri Lyne Carrington

Terri Lyne Carrington chronology
More to Say...Real Life Story (2009)	The Mosaic Project (2011)	Money Jungle: Provocative in Blue (2013)

The Mosaic Project is an album by jazz drummer Terri Lyne Carrington released in 2011 on Concord Jazz Records. The album reached No. 2 on the Billboard Contemporary Jazz Albums chart and No. 4 on the Billboard Top Jazz Albums chart.

== Overview ==
The album is part jazz, part rhythm and blues (R&B), with vocals contributed by Cassandra Wilson, Dianne Reeves, Dee Dee Bridgewater, Gretchen Parlato, Esperanza Spalding, and Nona Hendryx.

Carrington wrote five of the songs, including "Magic and Music", a tribute to singer Teena Marie, who died in 2010 seven months before The Mosaic Project was released.

== Covers ==
Lyne Carrington covered Ethel Merman's "I Got Lost in His Arms", "Michelle" by the Beatles and "Simply Beautiful" by Al Green on the album.

== Critical reception ==
Professional ratings
Review scores
Source	Rating
Jazz Times	(favourable)
AllMusic	4/5 stars
BBC	(favourable)
The Independent	(favourable)
The Guardian	4/5 stars
New York Times	(favourable)
Financial Times	(favourable)
Boston Globe	(favourable)

Jeff Tamarkin of Jazz Times proclaimed that "Carrington’s percussion and kit playing is potent throughout" on an LP where "seemingly unrelated elements coalesce into a greater, cohesive whole". Lara Bellini of the BBC noted that the album "steers clear of easy compartmentalization with its openness and freedom" and "offers, simply, some of the best jazz around." Nick Coleman of The Independent also described The Mosaic Project as "accessible, song-based contemporary jazz at its most earnest, ordered and empowering".

The Mosaic Project also won a Grammy Award for Best Vocal Jazz Album.

== Track listing ==
No.	Title	Writer(s)	Length
1.	"Transformation"	Nona Hendryx/Carole Pope/Kevan Staples	5:33
2.	"I Got Lost in His Arms"	Irving Berlin	4:58
3.	"Michelle"	John Lennon/Paul McCartney	6:52
4.	"Magic and Music"	Carrington	3:45
5.	"Echo"	Bernice Johnson Reagon	7:14
6.	"Simply Beautiful"	Al Green	4:30
7.	"Unconditional Love"	Geri Allen	5:56
8.	"Wistful"	Carrington	4:48
9.	"Crayola"	Esperanza Spalding	4:29
10.	"Soul Talk"	Carrington/Hendryx	5:55
11.	"Mosaic Triad"	Carrington	5:59
12.	"Insomniac"	Carrington	5:13
13.	"Show Me a Sign"	Carmen Lundy	2:28
14.	"Sisters on the Rise (A Transformation)"	Hendryx/Pope/Staples/Shea Rose	3:59

== Personnel ==
- Terri Lyne Carrington – drums, percussion, arranger, producer
- Cassandra Wilson – vocals
- Dianne Reeves – vocals
- Dee Dee Bridgewater – vocals
- Gretchen Parlato – vocals
- Carmen Lundy – vocals
- Nona Hendryx – vocals
- Shea Rose – vocals
- Esperanza Spalding – vocals, bass
- Mimi Jones – bass
- Anat Cohen – clarinet, bass clarinet, soprano saxophone
- Tineke Postma – alto saxophone, soprano saxophone
- Patrice Rushen – keyboards, piano
- Geri Allen – keyboards, piano
- Helen Sung – keyboards, piano
- Ingrid Jensen – flugelhorn, trumpet
- Hailey Niswanger – flute
- Linda Taylor – guitar
- Chia-Yin Carol Ma – violin
- Sheila E. – percussion
- Angela Davis – commentary

Technical

- Robert Hebert – executive producer
- Frank White – executive producer
- Bernie Yaged – associate producer
- Martin Walters – mixing
- Mike Marciano – engineer
- Erik Zobler – engineer
- Chaye DeGasperin – engineer
- Jeremy Loucas – engineer, mixing
- wiidope – Remix engineer, mixing
- Paul Blakemore – mastering
