= Terri Lyne Carrington =

American drummer (born 1965)

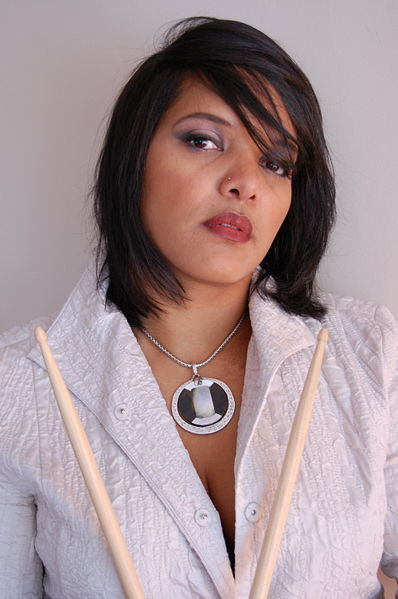

Background information
- Born: August 4, 1965 (age 61); Medford, Massachusetts, U.S.
- Genres: Jazz, R&B
- Occupations: Musician, composer, educator
- Instrument: Drums
- Years active: 1981–present
- Labels: Concord Jazz, E1, Video Arts, Verve Forecast, ACT, GrooveJazz Media
- Website: www.terrilynecarrington.com
- Education: Berklee College of Music

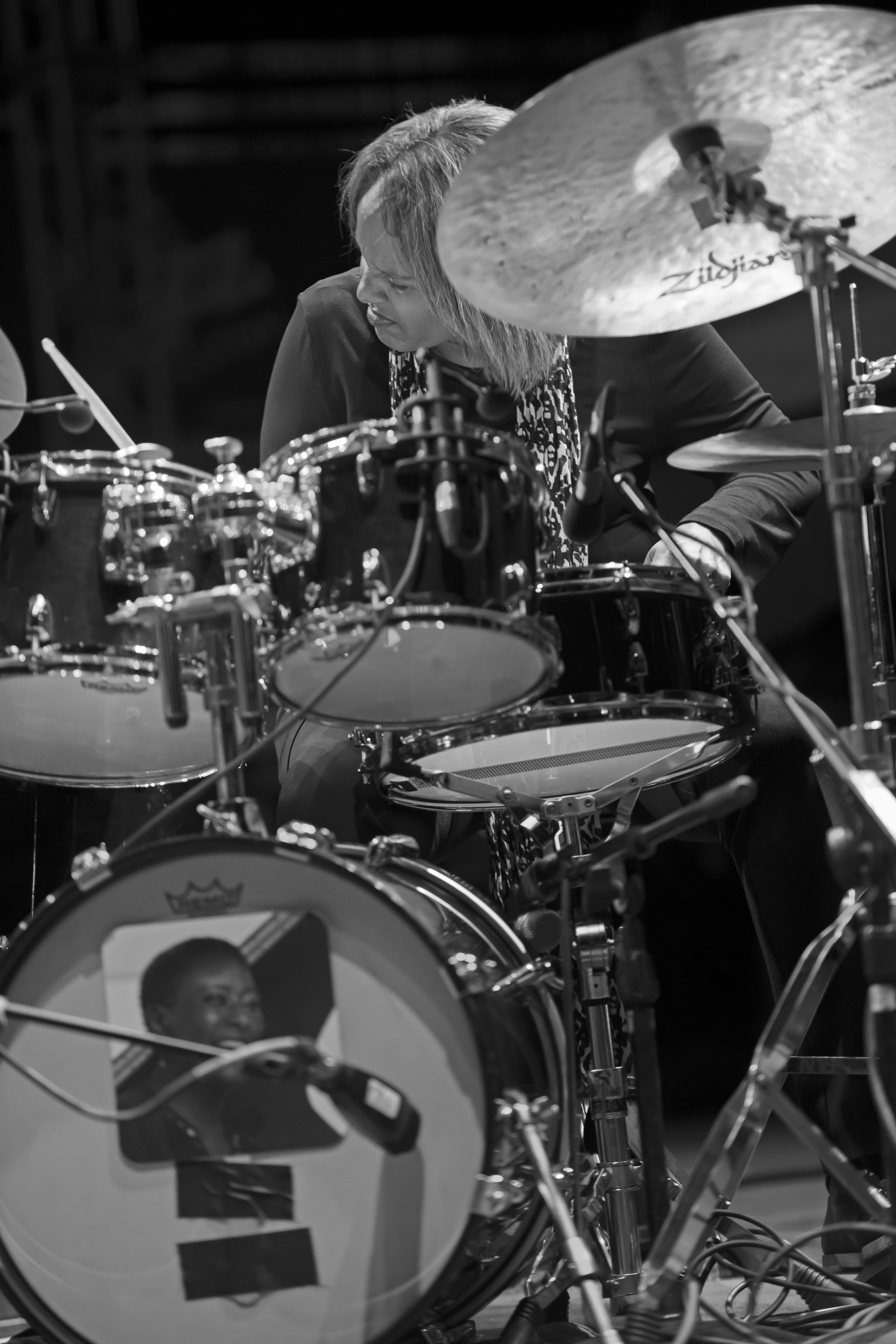
Carrington at the 2017 Detroit Jazz Festival

Terri Lyne Carrington (born August 4, 1965) is an American jazz drummer, composer, producer, and educator. She has played with Dizzy Gillespie, Stan Getz, Clark Terry, Herbie Hancock, Wayne Shorter, Joe Sample, Al Jarreau, Yellowjackets, and many others. She toured with each of Hancock's musical configurations (from electric to acoustic) between 1997 and 2007.

In 2007, she was appointed professor at her alma mater, Berklee College of Music, where she received an honorary doctorate in 2003. Carrington serves as founder and artistic director of the Berklee Institute of Jazz and Gender Justice and The Carr Center in Detroit, Michigan. She also serves on the board of trustees for The Recording Academy, board of directors for International Society for Jazz Arrangers and Composers and the advisory board for The History Makers and New Music USA.

She has won four Grammy Awards, including a 2013 award for Best Jazz Instrumental Album, which established her as the first female musician to win a Grammy in this category. She has been nominated for seven Grammy Awards, including her 2026 nomination for We Insist 2025! in the Best Jazz Vocal Album category.

Carrington is also a weekly host of Future Flavors with Terri Lyne Carrington, a one-hour show on SiriusXM's Real Jazz (channel 67).

== Early years ==
Carrington was born on August 4, 1965, in Medford, Massachusetts, United States, into a musical family: her mother played piano as a hobby and her father was a saxophonist and president of the Boston Jazz Society. At the age of seven, Carrington was given a set of drums that had belonged to her grandfather, Matt Carrington, who had played with Fats Waller and Chu Berry. After studying privately for three years, she gave her first major performance at the Wichita Jazz Festival with Clark Terry.

At the age of 11, she received a full scholarship to Berklee College of Music. She graduated from Medford High School in 1981 and enrolled in the Berklee College of Music for three semesters.

At Berklee College of Music she played with musicians such as Kevin Eubanks, Donald Harrison, and Greg Osby. She also studied under drum instructor Alan Dawson and made a private recording entitled TLC and Friends, with Kenny Barron, Buster Williams, George Coleman and her father.

== Music career ==
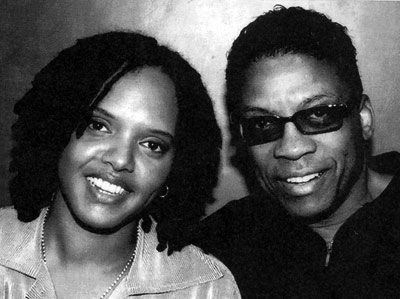
Carrington and Herbie Hancock

In 1983, encouraged by her mentor, Jack DeJohnette, Carrington moved to New York, where she worked with Lester Bowie, Stan Getz, James Moody, David Sanborn, Pharoah Sanders, and Cassandra Wilson. In the late 1980s, Carrington moved to Los Angeles, where she was the house drummer for The Arsenio Hall Show and later the drummer on Quincy Jones' late-night TV show VIBE hosted by Sinbad.

As a bandleader, she has worked with Geri Allen, James Genus, Josh Harri, Bob Hurst, Everette Harp, Nona Hendryx, Munyungo Jackson, Ingrid Jensen, Aruan Ortiz, Greg Phillinganes, Tineke Postma, Patrice Rushen, Nêgah Santos, Dwight Sills, Esperanza Spalding, Helen Sung, and Gary Thomas.

In summer 2011, she appeared with Wayne Shorter, John Patitucci, Danilo Perez in South America. She was musical director of the Sing the Truth Tour with Dianne Reeves, Lizz Wright and Angelique Kidjo (with Romero Lubambo, Geri Allen, James Genus, and Munyungo Jackson).

As a recording artist, in 1988 Carrington started concentrating her efforts on writing and producing her own works, resulting in Real Life Story, her 1989 Grammy-nominated debut album with Gerald Albright, Hiram Bullock, Greg Osby, Dianne Reeves, Patrice Rushen, Carlos Santana, John Scofield, Wayne Shorter, and Grover Washington Jr.; Jazz Is a Spirit, her 2002 European album with Terence Blanchard, Kevin Eubanks. Herbie Hancock, Wallace Roney, and Gary Thomas; and Structure, her 2004 European album with Greg Osby, Jimmy Haslip, and Adam Rogers.

In 2009, Carrington released More to Say ... Real Life Story: NextGen, a sequel to Real Life Story. The album includes Walter Beasley, George Duke, Lawrence Fields, Ray Fuller, Everette Harp, Jimmy Haslip, Robert Irving III, Chuck Loeb, Christian McBride, Les McCann, Lori Perry, Greg Phillinganes, Patrice Rushen, Dwight Sills, Chris Walker, Kirk Whalum, Anthony Wilson, Nancy Wilson, and a special appearance by Sonny Carrington.

In 2011, The Mosaic Project, her fifth album and her first for Concord Jazz, was released. It won the 2011 Grammy Award for Best Jazz Vocal Album. Carrington's 2013 album, Money Jungle: Provocative in Blue, included covers of songs by Duke Ellington, Charles Mingus, and Max Roach's 1962 album, Money Jungle, and won the 2013 Grammy Award for Best Jazz Instrumental Album. She is the first female musician to win a Grammy in this category.

Carrington's interdisciplinary work includes collaborations with visual artists Mickalene Thomas, Carrie Mae Weems, and choreographer Winifred R. Harris.

In October 2020, the National Endowment for the Arts (NEA) announced Carrington as one of four recipients of the NEA Jazz Masters Fellowships, celebrated in an online concert and show on April 22, 2021. Awarded in recognition of lifetime achievement, the honor is bestowed on individuals who have made significant contributions to the art form. The other 2021 recipients were Albert "Tootie" Heath, Phil Schaap, and Henry Threadgill.

September 2022 saw the publication of Carrington's book New Standards: 101 Lead Sheets by Women Composers and her album New Standards Vol. 1, an ambitious new endeavor created to uplift the voices of women composers. The 2022 album of 11 selections from the songbook features an all-star band plus a dozen special guests. Carrington also released a children's book, Three of a Kind - The Allen Carrington Spalding Trio, a non-fiction illustrated poem about three women who became musical companions through their love of jazz.

== Awards and honors ==
Year	Event	Work	Award	Result
1989	Boston Music Award		Outstanding Percussionist	Won
1990	Boston Music Award		Outstanding Drummer	Won
1990	32nd Grammy Awards	Real Life Story	Best Jazz Fusion Performance	Nominated
2003	Berklee College of Music		Honorary Doctorate	
2012	54th Grammy Awards	The Mosaic Project	Best Jazz Vocal Album	Won
2014	56th Grammy Awards	Money Jungle: Provocative in Blue	Best Jazz Instrumental Album	Won
2015	University of Pittsburgh		Lifetime Achievement Award	Won
2015	57th Grammy Awards	Dianne Reeves's Beautiful Life (produced by Carrington)	Best Jazz Vocal Album	Won
2018	The Jazz Gallery		Founders Award	Won
2018	Jazz Congress		Bruce Lundvall Visionary Award	Won
2019	Doris Duke Charitable Foundation		Doris Duke Artist Award	Won
2020	DownBeat Critics Poll		Jazz Artist	Won
2020	DownBeat Critics Poll	Waiting Game	Jazz Album	Won
2020	DownBeat Critics Poll	Terri Lyne Carrington & Social Science	Jazz Group	Won
2020	JJA Jazz Awards		Musician of the Year	Won
2020	JJA Jazz Awards		Drummer of the Year	Won
2020	Manhattan School of Music		Honorary Doctorate	
2021	63rd Annual Grammy Awards	Waiting Game (with Social Science)	Best Jazz Instrumental Album	Nominated
2021	JJA Jazz Awards		Musician of the Year	Won
2021	JJA Jazz Awards		Drummer of the Year	Won
2022	York University		Honorary Doctorate	
2023	65th Grammy Awards	New Standards Vol. 1 (with Kris Davis, Linda May Han Oh, Nicholas Payton, and Matthew Stevens)	Best Jazz Instrumental Album	Won
2023	65th Grammy Awards	Live at the Detroit Jazz Festival (with Wayne Shorter, Leo Genovese, and Esperanza Spalding)	Best Jazz Instrumental Album	Nominated

== Discography ==
=== As leader/co-leader ===
- TLC and Friends (CEI, 1981)
- Real Life Story (Verve Forecast, 1989)
- Jazz Is a Spirit (ACT, 2002)
- Structure with Adam Rogers, Jimmy Haslip, Greg Osby (ACT, 2004)
- Onetake: Volume Two with Robi Botos, Phil Dwyer, Marc Rogers (Alma, 2005)
- More to Say (Real Life Story: NextGen.) (E1 Entertainment, 2009)
- The Mosaic Project (Concord Jazz, 2011)
- Money Jungle: Provocative in Blue (Concord Jazz, 2013)
- The Mosaic Project: Love and Soul (Concord/Universal, 2015)
- The Act Years (ACT, 2015) – compilation with selections from Jazz Is a Spirit, Structure, and Nguyên Lê's Purple: Celebrating Jimi Hendrix
- Perfection, Murray, Allen & Carrington Power Trio, (Motéma, 2016)
- Waiting Game, Terri Lyne Carrington & Social Science, (Motéma, 2019)
- New Standards Vol. 1 with Nicholas Payton, Kris Davis, Linda May Han Oh, Matthew Stevens (Candid, 2022)
- Live at the Detroit Jazz Festival with Wayne Shorter, Leo Genovese, Esperanza Spalding (Candid, 2022)
- We Insist 2025! with Christie Dashiell (Candid, 2025)
- Trip the Night Fantastic, Terri Lyne Carrington & Social Science (Candid, 2026)

=== As sidewoman ===
Release	Leading artist	Album	Label
1985	Rufus Reid Trio	Seven Minds	Sunnyside
1986	Nancy Harrow	You're Nearer	Tono Records
1986	Mulgrew Miller	Work!	Landmark
1986	Scott Robinson	Winds of Change	MultiJazz
1987	Greg Osby	Greg Osby and Sound Theatre	JMT
1987	Michele Rosewoman	Quintessence	Enja
1988	Niels Lan Doky	The Truth - Live at Montmartre	Storyville
1988	John Scofield	Flat Out	Gramavision
1988	Wayne Shorter	Joy Ryder	Columbia
1988	Cassandra Wilson	Blue Skies	JMT
1989	Niels Lan Doky	Daybreak	Storyville
1989	Robin Eubanks	Different Perspectives	JMT
1990	Eric Marienthal	Crossroads	GRP
1990	John Patitucci	Sketchbook	GRP
1991	Dianne Reeves	I Remember	Blue Note
1992	David Benoit	Letter to Evan	GRP
1992	Mitchel Forman	What Else?	RCA
1992	Gary Thomas	Till We Have Faces	JMT
1992	Gust William Tsilis	Heritage	Ken
1992	Tony Lakatosh	Different Moods	Lipstick Records
1993	John Beasley	Change of Heart	Windham Hill
1993	Dianne Reeves	Art & Survival	EMI
1993	Nino Tempo	Nino	Atlantic Jazz
1993	Gary Thomas	Exile's Gate	JMT
1994	Gabrielle Goodman	Until We Love	JMT
1994	Klymaxx	One Day	Eighteen Sixty Three EP Wrekudz
1994	Dianne Reeves	Quiet After the Storm	Blue Note
1994	Patrice Rushen	Anything but Ordinary	Sindrome
1995	Paul Bollenback	Original Visions	Challenge
1995, 1997	Doky Brothers	Doky Brothers, Vol. 1 & 2	Blue Note
1995	James Moody	Moody's Birthday Celebration: Live at the Blue Note	Warner
1995	Wayne Shorter	High Life	Verve
1995	Nino Tempo	Live at Cicada	Atlantic
1996	Stan Getz	His Last Recording / In Concert	Loft
1996	Cæcilie Norby	My Corner of the Sky	Blue Note
1996	Danilo Perez	PanaMonk	Impulse!
1996	Michael Wolff Trio	2 AM	Cabana Boy
1996	Rachel Z	Room of One's Own	NYC
1997	James Moody	Moody Plays Mancini	Warner
1997	Dianne Reeves	That Day	Blue Note
1998	Herbie Hancock	Gershwin's World	Verve
1998	Niels Lan Doky	Niels Lan Doky	Verve Forecast
1998	Mulgrew Miller	Chapters 1 and 2	32 Jazz
2000	Paul Bollenback	Double Vision	Challenge
2000	Greg Osby	The Invisible Hand	Blue Note
2000	Diane Schuur	Friends for Schuur	Concord Jazz
2002	Herbie Hancock	The Jazz Channel Presents Herbie Hancock (DVD)	Image Entertainment
2002	Herbie Hancock	Future 2 Future - Live (DVD)	Columbia
2002	Nguyên Lê	Purple – Celebrating Jimi Hendrix	ACT
2003	Wayne Shorter	Alegría	Verve
2003	Cassandra Wilson	Glamoured	Blue Note
2004	Diana Krall	The Girl in the Other Room	Verve
2005	Rita Coolidge	And So Is Love	Paddle Wheel
2005	Don Friedman	Live at Jazz Baltica	Skip Records
2006	Tineke Postma	For the Rhythm	Munich
2006	George Duke	In a Mellow Tone	BPM
2006	Jan Shapiro	Back to Basics	Jan Shapiro
2006	Grace Kelly	Every Road I Walked	PAZZ Productions
2007	Tineke Postma	A Journey That Matters	Foreign Media Jazz
2009	Grace Kelly	Mood Changes	Pazz Productions
2009	Teena Marie	Congo Square	Stax
2009	Tineke Postma	The Traveller	Etcetera
2009	Mike Stern	Big Neighborhood	Heads Up
2010	Esperanza Spalding	Chamber Music Society	Heads Up
2010	Nona Hendryx	Mutatis Mutandis	Righteous Babe
2010	Mikkel Nordsø	Five Steps 2 Seven	Stunt Records
2012	Jazz Soul Seven	Impressions of Curtis Mayfield	BFM Jazz
2012	Esperanza Spalding	Radio Music Society	Heads Up
2012	Hey Rim Jeon	Introducing Hey Rim Jeon	PHASE ONE
2013	Dianne Reeves	Beautiful Life	Concord
2014	Gabrielle Goodman	Spiritual Tapestry	Goodness Music
2015	Franco Ambrosetti	After the Rain	Enja
2016	Grégoire Maret	Wanted Sunnyside	Sunnyside
2018	Tia Fuller	Diamond Cut	Mack Avenue
2018	Lewis Porter (Trio with John Patitucci)	Beauty & Mystery	Altrisuoni
2018	Kenny Werner	Church on Mars	Newvelle
2018	Luren Henderson	Ármame	Brontosaurus Records
2020	Tim Ray	Excursions and Adventures	Whaling City Sound
2022	Walter Smith III & Matthew Stevens	In Common III	Whirlwind Recordings
2022	Hey Rim Jieon	Groovitude	Baseline Live Entertainment
2024	Kevin Harris	Embers	N/A
2024	Cédric Henriot	French Stories	Plus Loin Music
2025	Milena Casado	Reflections of Another Self	Candid Records
2026	Matthew Stevens	Matthew Stevens	Candid Records
