= Diamond Cut (Tia Fuller album) =

Studio album by Tia Fuller
- Released: 2018
- Label: Mack Avenue

Diamond Cut is an album by Tia Fuller, released in 2018.

== Track listing ==
| No. | Title | Music | Length |
|---|---|---|---|
| 1. | "In the Trenches" | Tia Fuller | 6:18 |
| 2. | "Save Your Love for Me" | Buddy Johnson, arr. by Warren Wolf | 5:40 |
| 3. | "I Love You" | Cole Porter, arr. by Tia Fuller | 6:22 |
| 4. | "Queen Intuition" | Tia Fuller | 6:01 |
| 5. | "Joe'n Around" | Tia Fuller | 4:15 |
| 6. | "Crowns of Grey" | Tia Fuller | 5:55 |
| 7. | "The Coming" | Tia Fuller | 6:59 |
| 8. | "Soul Eyes" | Mal Waldron, arr. by Tia Fuller | 5:40 |
| 9. | "Delight" | Tia Fuller | 5:02 |
| 10. | "Fury of Da'mond" | Tia Fuller | 4:00 |
| 11. | "Tears of Santa Barbara" | Tia Fuller | 4:25 |
| 12. | "Joe'n Around" (Alternate Take) | Tia Fuller | 3:07 |
| Total length: | | | 1:03:44 |
