= GRACEfulLEE =

Studio album by Grace Kelly and Lee Konitz
- Released: 2008
- Genre: Jazz
- Length: 54:10
- Label: Pazz Productions

Professional ratings
Review scores
| Source | Rating |
|---|---|
| AllMusic | 3.5/5 stars |

GRACEfulLEE is an album by American jazz saxophonists Grace Kelly and Lee Konitz. It was released on July 8, 2008.

GRACEfulLEE is Kelly's fourth studio album. It has received positive reviews from music critics, including a four and a half star review from Down Beat Magazine in November 2008. Down Beat went on to name the album as one of the "Best CDs of 2008" in January 2009 and then one of the "Best CDs of the 2000s the next year. The cover of this album made a brief appearance in the television series, Bosch, produced by Amazon Studios, recreating a scene from the novel The Black Box (A Harry Bosch Book) by Michael Connelly. when Harry Bosch tries to interest his daughter in Jazz by noting some of the younger artists of the genre.

The cross-generation collaboration on this album was duly noted by John Fordham of the Guardian in his four-star review:"Those who have heard Konitz's unquenchably inventive, tirelessly curious improvising will relish his cliche-purged style. But the formidable Kelly's grasp of that approach, and twisting of it with wayward diversions and rhythmic surprises, brings the sometimes laconic Konitz to the boil." It is also solidified with comments on

Kelly's collaboration with Lee Konitz continued into 2014, appearing as a guest with the Quartet onstage at the 60th Newport Jazz Festival of that year.

== Track listing ==
1. "Subconscious Lee" – 8:54
2. "Just Friends" – 3:44
3. "GRACEfulLEE" – 8:28
4. "There Is No Greater Love" – 6:02
5. "Alone Together" – 2:26
6. "Buzzing Around" – 1:12
7. "Thingin'" – 9:39
8. "Call of the Spirits" – 4:09
9. "NY at Noon" – 1:50

== Personnel ==
- Grace Kelly – Alto saxophone
- Lee Konitz – Alto saxophone
- Russell Malone – Guitar
- Rufus Reid – Bass
- Matt Wilson – Drums
