= Tia Fuller =

American saxophonist (born 1976)

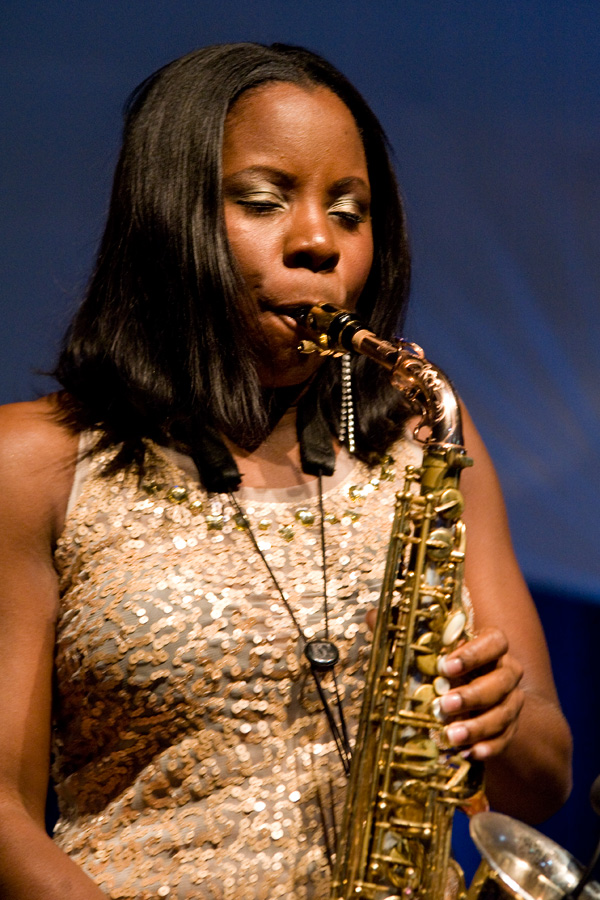
- Tia Fuller, Moers Festival 2011

Background information
- Born: March 27, 1976 (age 50); Aurora, Colorado, U.S.
- Genre: Jazz
- Occupations: Musician, composer, educator
- Instrument: Saxophone
- Label: Mack Avenue
- Website: www.tiafuller.com

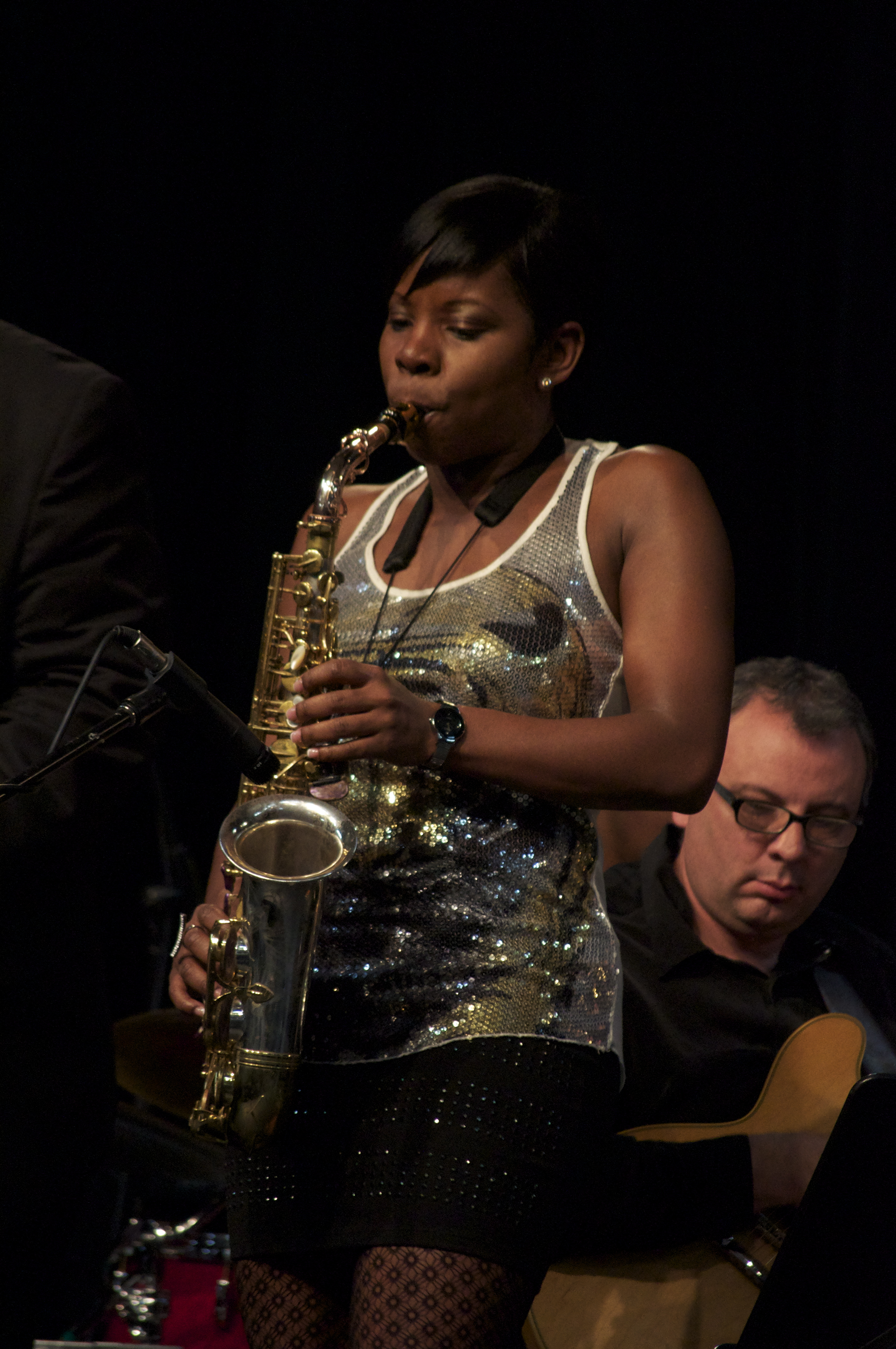
Tia Fuller in concert

Tia Fuller (born March 27, 1976) is an American saxophonist, composer, and educator, and a member of the all-female band touring with Beyoncé. Fuller is currently a faculty member in the ensembles department at Berklee College of Music. Fuller was a Featured Jazz Musician in Pixar's animated film Soul. For the film Fuller plays an alto saxophone with a Vandoren mouthpiece for the character Dorothea Williams. The appearance of Dorothea Williams is influenced by Fuller, and the character's speaking lines are voiced by Angela Bassett.

== Background ==
Fuller was born in Aurora, Colorado to jazz musicians Fred and Ethiopia Fuller. Her father, Fred, plays bass and her mother, Ethiopia, sings. She grew up playing classical piano at the age of three and listening to her parents rehearse in the basement of their home, as well as to the music of John Coltrane, Sarah Vaughan and Charlie Parker. She studied classical piano for 10 years, started playing the flute at the age of nine, and took up the saxophone and became interested in jazz in high school. Her sister, Shamie Royston, is a jazz pianist and a regular member of Fuller's ensemble.

Fuller began playing saxophone at Gateway High School, after which she continued her musical education at Spelman College in Atlanta, Georgia, under the tutelage of Joseph Jennings. While at Spelman, she performed with Ray Charles. In 1998, she graduated magna cum laude with a Bachelor of Arts degree in Music, and later went on to complete a Master's in Music, Jazz Pedagogy, and Performance in 2000 from the University of Colorado at Boulder.

== Career ==
Fuller has regularly performed with a number of jazz artists, including Esperanza Spalding, Terri Lyne Carrington, Ralph Peterson Septet, the T.S. Monk Septet, the Jon Faddis Jazz Orchestra, the Rufus Reid Septet, the Sean Jones Quintet and the Nancy Wilson Jazz Orchestra.

Fuller has led a quartet which includes Shamie Royston on piano, Kim Thompson on drums, and Miriam Sullivan on bass, and with whom she has recorded the albums Pillar of Strength (2005, Wambui), Healing Space (2007, Mack Avenue), and Decisive Steps (2010, Mack Avenue).

In 2006, she was a member of the all-female band touring with Beyoncé.

In 2012, she toured with Esperanza Spalding as leader of the Radio Music Society horn section, in which she played saxophone in dialogue with Spalding's scat singing.

In 2019, she recorded with Roy Haynes, Jon Batiste, Linda May Han Oh and Marcus Gilmore for The Walt Disney Company's movie Soul.

Fuller was nominated for a Grammy Award for her 2019 album Diamond Cut, produced by Terri Lyne Carrington, whom she has described as one of her mentors.

She was artist in residence at the Burlington Discover Jazz Festival.

She teaches at Berklee College of Music.

== Discography ==
=== As leader ===
- Pillar of Strength (Wambui, 2005)
- Healing Space (Mack Avenue, 2007)
- Decisive Steps (Mack Avenue, 2010)
- Angelic Warrior (Mack Avenue, 2012)
- Diamond Cut (Mack Avenue, 2018)

=== Compilations ===
- It's Christmas on Mack Avenue (Mack Avenue, 2014)

=== As sideman ===
with Joe Budden

- Joe Budden (Def Jam, 2003)

with Miki Hayama

- Vibrant (Art Union @ Jazz, 2004)

with Faye Carol

- Faye Sings The Blues (Getdown, 2026)

with Sean Jones

- Eternal Journey (Mack Avenue, 2004)
- Gemini (Mack Avenue, 2005)
- Roots (Mack Avenue, 2006)
- Kaleidoscope (Mack Avenue, 2007)

with Brad Leali

- Maria Juanez (TCB Music, 2007)

with Nancy Wilson

- Turned to Blue (MCG Jazz, 2006)
