= 2024 in jazz =

- Decade: 2020s in jazz
- Music: 2024 in music
- Standards: List of jazz standards
- See also: 2023 in jazz – 2025 in jazz

This is a timeline documenting events of jazz in the year 2024.

== Events ==
=== January ===
- January 27 – Domi and JD Beck tour in Singapore

=== February ===
- February 4 – The 66th Annual Grammy Awards occur.

=== July ===
- July 9 – Kamasi Washington starts his first ever UK tour, at a bar in Herne Hill, UK

=== October ===
- October 11–20 – Headliners at the Stockholm Jazz Festival include Bill Frisell, Julius Rodriguez, Sona Jobarteh, Gogo Penguin and The Headhunters.

== Albums ==
Month	Day	Album	Artist	Label	Notes	Ref.
January	19	Cloudward	Mary Halvorson	Nonesuch Records		
January	19	Foreverland	Keyon Harrold	Concord Jazz		
January	19	Technically Acceptable	Ethan Iverson	Blue Note Records		
January	17	live	Clown Core		Recorded November 17th 2023	
January	26	The Room	Sam Gendel and Fabiano do Nascimento	Real World		
January	26	Trust the process	Filippo Ieraci, Simone Serafini and Jacopo Zanette	Amerio Stefano edizioni musicali		
February	2	Compassion	Vijay Iyer, Linda May Han Oh, Tyshawn Sorey	ECM Records		
February	9	Nublues	Joel Ross	Blue Note Records		
March	1	Speak to Me	Julian Lage	Blue Note Records		
March	8	Visions	Norah Jones	Blue Note Records		
March	8	Eagle's Point	Chris Potter with Brad Mehldau, Brian Blade, and John Patitucci	Edition Records		
April	5	Echoes of the Inner Prophet	Melissa Aldana	Blue Note Records		
April	12	Who Killed AI?	Kenny Garrett and Svoy	Mack Avenue Records		
May	3	Fearless Movement	Kamasi Washington	Young		
May	31	Night Reign	Arooj Aftab	Verve Records		
August	9	Milton + Esperanza	Milton Nascimento and Esperanza Spalding	Concord Records		
September	20	50	Herb Alpert	Herb Alpert Presents		
September	27	Planetarium	Ben Monder			
September	27	Against the Fall of Night	Sungazer			
October	11	Portrait	Samara Joy	Verve		
October	24	Portrait of Right Now	Jocelyn Gould			

== Awards ==
=== Grammy Awards ===
The 66th Annual Grammy Awards were held on February 4, 2024 honoring the best recordings, compositions, and artists from October 1, 2022, to September 15, 2023, as chosen by the members of the Recording Academy.

Jazz
Best Jazz Performance: "Tight" – Samara Joy; "Movement 18' (Heroes)" – Jon Batiste; "Basquiat" – Lakecia Benjamin; "Vulnerable (Live)" – Adam Blackstone featuring The Baylor Project & Russell Ferranté; "But Not For Me" – Fred Hersch & Esperanza Spalding	Best Jazz Vocal Album: How Love Begins – Nicole Zuraitis; For Ella 2 – Patti Austin featuring Gordon Goodwin's Big Phat Band; Alive at the Village Vanguard – Fred Hersch & Esperanza Spalding; Lean In – Gretchen Parlato & Lionel Loueke; Mélusine – Cécile McLorin Salvant
Best Jazz Instrumental Album: The Winds of Change – Billy Childs; The Source – Kenny Barron; Phoenix – Lakecia Benjamin; Legacy: The Instrumental Jawn – Adam Blackstone; Dream Box – Pat Metheny	Best Large Jazz Ensemble Album: Basie Swings The Blues – The Count Basie Orchestra directed by Scotty Barnhart; The Chick Corea Symphony Tribute – Ritmo – ADDA Simfònica, Josep Vicent, Emilio Solla; Dynamic Maximum Tension – Darcy James Argue's Secret Society; Olympians – Vince Mendoza & Metropole Orkest; The Charles Mingus Centennial Sessions – Mingus Big Band
Best Latin Jazz Album: El Arte del Bolero Vol. 2 – Miguel Zenón & Luis Perdomo; Quietude – Eliane Elias; My Heart Speaks – Ivan Lins with the Tbilisi Symphony Orchestra; Vox Humana – Bobby Sanabria Multiverse Big Band; Cometa – Luciana Souza & Trio Corrente	Best Alternative Jazz Album: The Omnichord Real Book – Meshell Ndegeocello; Love in Exile – Arooj Aftab, Vijay Iyer, Shahzad Ismaily; Quality Over Opinion – Louis Cole; SuperBlue: The Iridescent Spree – Kurt Elling, Charlie Hunter, SuperBlue; Live at the Piano – Cory Henry

== All critically reviewed albums ranked ==
Metacritic

Number	Artist	Album	Average score	Number of reviews	Reference
1	Charles Lloyd	The Sky Will Still Be There Tomorrow	95	6	
2	Julian Lage	Speak to Me	91	4	
3	Arooj Aftab	Night Reign	89	12	
4	Blue Lab Beats	Blue Eclipse	87	4	
5	Vijay Iyer	Compassion	86	6	
6	Ezra Collective	Dance, No One's Watching	85	10	
7	Out Of/Into	Motion 1	85	5	
8	Mary Halvorson	Cloudward	84	8	
9	Meshell Ndegeocello	No More Water: The Gospel of James Baldwin	84	7	
9	Sun Ra Arkestra	Lights On a Satellite	84	7	
9	Amaro Freitas	Y’Y	84	7	
10	Esperanza Spalding and Milton Nascimento	Milton + Esperanza	84	5	
10	Bill Frisell	Orchestras	84	5	
10	Madeleine Peyroux	Let's Walk	84	5	
11	Placenta	Carlos Niño	84	4	
11	Joel Ross	Nublues	84	4	
11	Orquesta Akokán	Caracoles	84	4	
11	Zara McFarlane	Sweet Whispers: Celebrating Sarah Vaughan	84	4	
12	Nala Sinephro	Endlessness	83	13	
13	Shabaka Hutchings	Perceive Its Beauty, Acknowledge Its Grace	83	9	
14	Nubya Garcia	Odyssey	83	9	
15	Kamasi Washington	Fearless Movement	82	16	
16	Wendy Eisenberg	Viewfinder	82	7	
17	Mary Halvorson	Cloudward	81	9	
18	The Necks	Bleed	81	6	
18	SML	Small Medium Large	81	6	
19	Anna Butterss	Mighty Vertebrate	81	5	
20	Pat Metheny	MoonDial	80	4	
21	Fievel Is Glauque	Rong Weicknes	77	7	

== Deaths ==
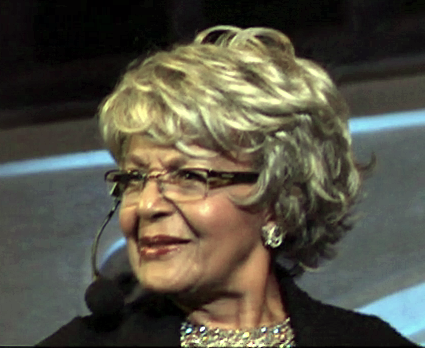
Eleanor Collins

- January 25 – Bruno Amstad, Swiss jazz singer, 59 (cancer)
- January 26
  - Dean Brown, American jazz fusion guitarist and session musician, 68 (cancer)
  - Michel Hausser, French jazz vibraphonist, 96
- January 29 – Tony Cedras, South African jazz musician, 71
- March 3 – Eleanor Collins, 104, Canadian jazz singer and TV host
- April 5 – Phil Nimmons, Canadian jazz clarinetist, 100
- April 7 – Joe Viera, German saxophonist and festival founder, 91
- May 7 – Jan Ptaszyn Wróblewski, Polish jazz musician, composer and arranger, 88
- June 9 – Alex Riel, Danish jazz and rock drummer, 83
- August 3 – Shaun Martin, American jazz keyboardist from Snarky Puppy, 45
- August 23 – Russell Malone, American jazz guitarist, 60
- November 12 – Roy Haynes, American jazz drummer, 99

== See also ==
- List of 2024 albums
- List of jazz festivals
- List of years in jazz
- 2024 in music
