= 66th Annual Grammy Awards =

2024 US music awards ceremony

- Date: February 4, 2024
- Location: Crypto.com Arena; Los Angeles, California
- Hosted by: Trevor Noah

Highlights
- Most awards: Phoebe Bridgers (4)
- Most nominations: SZA (9)
- Website: grammy.com

Television/radio coverage
- Network: CBS; Paramount+
- Viewership: 16.9 million

The 66th Annual Grammy Awards honored the best recordings, compositions, and artists from October 1, 2022, to September 15, 2023, as chosen by the members of The Recording Academy, on February 4, 2024. In its 21st year at the Crypto.com Arena in Los Angeles, the ceremony was broadcast on CBS and available to stream on Paramount+, and was hosted by Trevor Noah for the fourth time.

The nominations were announced on November 10, 2023; SZA received the most nominations with nine, followed by Victoria Monét, Phoebe Bridgers (solo and as part of boygenius), and Serban Ghenea with seven each. Monét's 2-year-old daughter, Hazel, became the youngest nominee in Grammy Awards history; she was a featured artist on her mother's song "Hollywood", which was nominated for Best Traditional R&B Performance.

Bridgers was the night's biggest winner, receiving four awards: Three as part of Boygenius (Best Rock Song, Best Rock Performance, and Best Alternative Music Album) and Best Pop Duo/Group Performance alongside SZA. SZA, Monét, and Killer Mike received three awards each. Taylor Swift made history as the first singer to win Album of the Year four times, and Swift announced the release of her album The Tortured Poets Department while accepting the award for Best Pop Vocal Album. Engineer Serban Ghenea extended his record with a fifth award in the category as well. South African singer Tyla was the winner of the inaugural Best African Performance award. Paramore became the first female-fronted rock band to win the Grammy Award for Best Rock Album.

In the big four categories, Swift's Midnights won the aforementioned Album of the Year prize; Miley Cyrus's "Flowers" won Record of the Year; Billie Eilish and her brother Finneas won Song of the Year for "What Was I Made For?" (from the soundtrack of Barbie); and Victoria Monét took home Best New Artist.

== Background ==
For the 2024 ceremony, the academy announced several changes for different categories, the introduction of new categories, and updates on eligibility rules:

=== Category changes ===
- Three new categories – Best African Music Performance, Best Alternative Jazz Album and Best Pop Dance Recording – were added. There are 94 categories total.
- Two categories, Producer of the Year, Non-Classical and Songwriter of the Year, Non-Classical, were moved to the General Field and can now be voted on by the entire Grammy voting membership.
- The number of nominees in the "Big Four" General Field categories (Album of the Year, Record of the Year, Song of the Year, and Best New Artist) was reduced again from ten to eight.
- In order to qualify as a nominee on a project nominated for Album of the Year, the credited [lead] artists, featured artists, songwriters, producers, engineers, mixers and mastering engineers must play on a total of 20% of an album's playing time. There had previously been no minimum level of involvement required at the preceding two Grammy Awards.
- The requirement that a project must include at least 51% performance-based material has been removed from the Best Music Film category.
- Best Regional Mexican Music Album (including Tejano) has been renamed Best Música Mexicana Album (including Tejano).
- Best Improvised Jazz Solo has been renamed Best Jazz Solo Performance.

=== Field changes ===
The Grammy ballot was reduced from 26 fields to 11, not including the General Field. The Recording Academy stated that this was done to ensure that all voting members were able to exercise all 10 of their allocated votes, as this was prevented when some fields only contained one category. In addition to their votes in the General Field, voters are encouraged to cast up to ten genre category votes spread across a maximum of three fields. As of the 66th Annual Grammy Awards, the fields are listed as follows:

1. General (6 categories)
2. Pop & Dance/Electronic Music (6 categories)
3. Rock, Metal & Alternative Music (6 categories)
4. R&B, Rap & Spoken Word Poetry (10 categories)
5. Jazz, Traditional Pop, Contemporary Instrumental & Musical Theater (9 categories)
6. Country & American Roots Music (13 categories)
7. Gospel & Contemporary Christian Music (5 categories)
8. Latin, Global, African, Reggae & New Age, Ambient or Chant Music (10 categories)
9. Children's, Comedy, Audiobook Narration and Storytelling, Visual Media & Music Video/Film (9 categories)
10. Package, Notes & Historical (4 categories)
11. Production, Engineering, Composition & Arrangement (8 categories)
12. Classical Music (8 categories)

=== Artificial intelligence ineligibility ===
On June 16, 2023, in response to the rapidly developing field of artificial intelligence (AI), the Recording Academy declared that "only human creators are eligible to be submitted for consideration for, nominated for, or win a Grammy Award. A work that contains no human authorship is not eligible in any categories." The organization further specified that works featuring AI-generated material are eligible for an award only if a human contributed to the work meaningfully in the creation process and that contributors of only AI-generated material are not eligible for an award. This controversy was cleared up when the song "Heart on My Sleeve" by ghostwriter977, which uses AI voice cloning to mimic the vocals of Drake and The Weeknd, was submitted for Grammy consideration. While the song was written by a human, it was deemed ineligible due to its AI vocals, illegal usage of those vocals without clearance by either artists' record labels, and lack of commercial availability.

== Performers ==
The first three performers for the ceremony, Billie Eilish, Dua Lipa, and Olivia Rodrigo, were announced on January 15, 2024. The second batch of performers, consisting of Travis Scott, Luke Combs and Burna Boy, were announced on January 21. Billy Joel, who performed on the Grammys for the first time in 22 years, was announced on January 25, the same day that the performers for the Premiere ceremony were revealed to be J. Ivy, Jordin Sparks, Larkin Poe, Pentatonix, Sheila E, Laufey and more. U2 joined the lineup on January 27, with a performance from their U2:UV residency at Sphere in Las Vegas. Joni Mitchell, who made her debut performance at the ceremony, was announced on January 28. SZA joined the lineup on January 29. Performers for the In Memoriam segment were announced on February 2, with Miley Cyrus confirmed to perform in the ceremony on the same day. Playboi Carti also performed with Travis Scott.

=== Premiere ceremony ===
List of performers at the premiere ceremony
Artist(s)	Song(s)
J. Ivy Jordin Sparks Larkin Poe Pentatonix Sheila E.	"Let's Go Crazy"
Brandy Clark SistaStrings	"Dear Insecurity"
Kirk Franklin	"All Things"
Laufey	"From the Start"
Gaby Moreno El David Aguilar	"Luna de Xelajú"
Adam Blackstone Harvey Mason Bob James Terrace Martin Robert Glasper	"Nautilus"

=== Main ceremony ===
List of performers at the 66th Annual Grammy Awards
Artist(s)	Song(s)
Dua Lipa	"Training Season" "Houdini"
Tracy Chapman Luke Combs	"Fast Car"
SZA	"Snooze" "Kill Bill"
Billie Eilish Finneas O'Connell	"What Was I Made For?"
Miley Cyrus	"Flowers"
Olivia Rodrigo	"Vampire"
U2	"Atomic City" (from the Sphere in Paradise, Nevada)
Stevie Wonder Annie Lennox Wendy & Lisa Jon Batiste Ann Nesby Cory Henry Jimmy Jam & Terry Lewis Fantasia Adam Blackstone	In Memoriam "For Once in My Life" "The Best Is Yet to Come" (tribute to Tony Bennett) "Nothing Compares 2 U" (tribute to Sinéad O'Connor) "Ain't No Sunshine" "Lean on Me" "Optimistic" (tribute to Clarence Avant) "Proud Mary" (tribute to Tina Turner)
Joni Mitchell Brandi Carlile SistaStrings Blake Mills Lucius Allison Russell Jacob Collier	"Both Sides, Now"
Travis Scott Playboi Carti	"My Eyes" "I Know ?" "Fein"
Burna Boy 21 Savage Brandy	"On Form" "City Boys" "Sittin' on Top of the World"
Billy Joel Laufey	"Turn the Lights Back On" "You May Be Right"

== Presenters ==
Justin Tranter was announced as the host for the Premiere ceremony on January 25, 2024, alongside the list of presenters. The presenters for the main ceremony were announced on January 31. Watsonx, a generative AI tool of IBM, was used to generate editorial content around nominees during the presentation.

Premiere ceremony

- Justin Tranter ― host
- Carly Pearce
- Jimmy Jam
- Molly Tuttle
- Natalia Lafourcade
- Patti Austin
- Rufus Wainwright

Main ceremony

- Mariah Carey ― Presented Best Pop Solo Performance
- Christina Aguilera and Maluma ― Presented Best Música Urbana Album
- Kacey Musgraves ― Presented Best Country Album
- Lizzo ― Presented Best R&B Song
- U2 ― Presented Best Pop Vocal Album
- Lenny Kravitz ― Introduced Jon Batiste
- Oprah Winfrey ― Introduced Fantasia
- Lionel Richie ― Presented Song of the Year
- Brandi Carlile — Introduced Joni Mitchell
- Samara Joy — Presented Best New Artist
- Meryl Streep and Mark Ronson — Presented Record of the Year
- Celine Dion — Presented Album of the Year

== Winners and nominees ==
First round voting took place from October 11 to October 20, 2023. The nominations were announced on November 10 on a livestream by Arooj Aftab, Vince Gill and Amy Grant, Jimmy Jam, Jon Bon Jovi, Samara Joy, Muni Long, Cheryl Pawelski, Kim Petras, Judith Sherman, St. Vincent, Jeff Tweedy, Weird Al Yankovic, Gayle King, Nate Burleson, Tony Dokoupil, and Harvey Mason Jr.

Final round voting took place from December 14, 2023, to January 4, 2024. Winners were announced during the Grammy Awards Premiere Ceremony and telecast. Winners appear first and highlighted in bold.

=== General Field ===
General Field
**Record of the Year**: **"Flowers" – Miley Cyrus**; **Kid Harpoon & Tyler Johnson, producers; Michael Pollack, Brian Rajaratnam & Mark "Spike" Stent, engineers/mixers; Joe LaPorta, mastering engineer**; "Worship" – Jon Batiste; Jon Batiste, Jon Bellion, Pete Nappi & Tenroc, producers; Serban Ghenea & Pete Nappi, engineers/mixers; Chris Gehringer, mastering engineer; "Not Strong Enough" – Boygenius; Boygenius & Catherine Marks, producers; Owen Lantz, Catherine Marks, Mike Mogis, Bobby Mota, Kaushlesh "Garry" Purohit & Sarah Tudzin, engineers/mixers; Pat Sullivan, mastering engineer; "What Was I Made For?" – Billie Eilish; Billie Eilish & Finneas, producers; Billie Eilish, Rob Kinelski & Finneas, engineers/mixers; Chris Gehringer, mastering engineer; "On My Mama" – Victoria Monét; Deputy, Dernst Emile II & Jeff Gitelman, producers; Patrizio Pigliapoco & Todd Robinson, engineers/mixers; Colin Leonard, mastering engineer; "Vampire" – Olivia Rodrigo; Daniel Nigro, producer; Serban Ghenea, Michael Harris, Chris Kasych, Daniel Nigro & Dan Viafore, engineers/mixers; Randy Merrill, mastering engineer; "Anti-Hero" – Taylor Swift; Jack Antonoff & Taylor Swift, producers; Jack Antonoff, Serban Ghenea, Laura Sisk & Lorenzo Wolff, engineers/mixers; Randy Merrill, mastering engineer; "Kill Bill" – SZA; Rob Bisel & Carter Lang, producers; Rob Bisel, engineer/mixer; Dale Becker, mastering engineer.
**Album of the Year**: **Midnights – Taylor Swift**; **Jack Antonoff & Taylor Swift, producers; Jack Antonoff, Zem Audu, Serban Ghenea, David Hart, Mikey Freedom Hart, Sean Hutchinson, Ken Lewis, Michael Riddleberger, Laura Sisk & Evan Smith, engineers/mixers; Jack Antonoff & Taylor Swift, songwriters; Randy Merrill, mastering engineer**; World Music Radio – Jon Batiste; Jon Batiste, Jon Bellion, Nick Cooper, Pete Nappi & Tenroc, producers; Jon Batiste, Pete Nappi, Kaleb Rollins, Laura Sisk & Marc Whitmore, engineers/mixers; Jon Batiste, Jon Bellion, Jason Cornet & Pete Nappi, songwriters; Chris Gehringer, mastering engineer; The Record – Boygenius; Boygenius & Catherine Marks, producers; Owen Lantz, Will Maclellan, Catherine Marks, Mike Mogis, Bobby Mota, Kaushlesh "Garry" Purohit & Sarah Tudzin, engineers/mixers; Julien Baker, Phoebe Bridgers & Lucy Dacus, songwriters; Pat Sullivan, mastering engineer; Endless Summer Vacation – Miley Cyrus; Kid Harpoon, Tyler Johnson & Mike Will Made It, producers; Pièce Eatah, Craig Frank, Paul David Hager, Stacy Jones, Brian Rajaratnam & Mark "Spike" Stent, engineers/mixers; Miley Cyrus, Gregory Aldae Hein, Thomas Hull, Tyler Johnson, Michael Len Williams II & Michael Pollack, songwriters; Joe LaPorta, mastering engineer; Did You Know That There's a Tunnel Under Ocean Blvd – Lana Del Rey; Jack Antonoff, Zach Dawes, Lana Del Rey & Drew Erickson, producers; Jack Antonoff, Michael Harris, Dean Reid & Laura Sisk, engineers/mixers; Jack Antonoff, Lana Del Rey & Mike Hermosa, songwriters; Ruairi O'Flaherty, mastering engineer; The Age of Pleasure – Janelle Monáe; Sensei Bueno, Nate "Rocket" Wonder & Nana Kwabena, producers; Mick Guzauski, Nate "Rocket" Wonder, Jayda Love, Janelle Monáe & Yáng Tan, engineers/mixers; Jarrett Goodly, Nathaniel Irvin III, Janelle Monáe Robinson & Nana Kwabena Tuffuor, songwriters; Dave Kutch, mastering engineer; Guts – Olivia Rodrigo; Daniel Nigro, producer; Serban Ghenea, Sterling Laws, Mitch McCarthy, Daniel Nigro, Dave Schiffman, Mark "Spike" Stent, Sam Stewart & Dan Viafore, engineers/mixers; Daniel Nigro & Olivia Rodrigo, songwriters; Randy Merrill, mastering engineer; SOS – SZA; Rob Bisel, ThankGod4Cody & Carter Lang, producers; Rob Bisel, engineer/mixer; Rob Bisel, Cody Fayne, Carter Lang & Solána Rowe, songwriters; Dale Becker, mastering engineer
**Song of the Year**: **"What Was I Made For?"**; **Billie Eilish O'Connell & Finneas O'Connell, songwriters (Billie Eilish)**; "A&W"; Jack Antonoff, Lana Del Rey & Sam Dew, songwriters (Lana Del Rey); "Anti-Hero"; Jack Antonoff & Taylor Swift, songwriters (Taylor Swift); "Butterfly"; Jon Batiste & Dan Wilson, songwriters (Jon Batiste); "Dance the Night"; Caroline Ailin, Dua Lipa, Mark Ronson & Andrew Wyatt, songwriters (Dua Lipa); "Flowers"; Miley Cyrus, Gregory Aldae Hein & Michael Pollack, songwriters (Miley Cyrus); "Kill Bill"; Rob Bisel, Carter Lang & Solána Rowe, songwriters (SZA); "Vampire"; Daniel Nigro & Olivia Rodrigo, songwriters (Olivia Rodrigo)
**Best New Artist**: **Victoria Monét**; Gracie Abrams; Fred Again; Ice Spice; Jelly Roll; Coco Jones; Noah Kahan; The War and Treaty
**Producer of the Year, Non-Classical**: **Jack Antonoff**; 1. **Being Funny in a Foreign Language (The 1975) (A)**; 2. **Did You Know That There's a Tunnel Under Ocean Blvd (Lana Del Rey) (A)**; 3. **Midnights (Taylor Swift) (A)**; Dernst "D'Mile" Emile II; 1. Jaguar II (Victoria Monét) (A); Hit-Boy; 1. "Bus Stop" (Don Toliver featuring Brent Faiyaz) (T); 2. "Just Face It" (Dreamville with Blxst) (T); 3. King's Disease III (Nas) (A); 4. Magic 3 (Nas) (A); 5. Magic 2 (Nas) (A); 6. "Slipping Into Darkness" (Hit-Boy & The Alchemist) (S); 7. Surf or Drown Vol. 1 (Hit-Boy) (A); 8. Surf or Drown Vol. 2 (Hit-Boy) (A); 9. Victims & Villains (Musiq Soulchild & Hit-Boy) (A); Metro Boomin; 1. "Am I Dreaming" (Metro Boomin featuring Roisee & ASAP Rocky) (S); 2. "Calling" (Metro Boomin featuring Nav, A Boogie wit da Hoodie & Swae Lee) (S); 3. "Creepin'" (Metro Boomin featuring 21 Savage & The Weeknd) (S); 4. "More M's" (Drake & 21 Savage) (S); 5. "Oh U Went" (Young Thug featuring Drake) (S); 6. "Superhero (Heroes & Villains)" (Metro Boomin, Future & Chris Brown) (S); 7. "Til Further Notice" (Travis Scott featuring James Blake & 21 Savage) (S); 8. "Trance" (Metro Boomin featuring Travis Scott & Young Thug) (S); 9. "War Bout It" (Lil Durk featuring 21 Savage) (S); Daniel Nigro; 1. "Casual" (Chappell Roan) (S); 2. "Divide" (Dermot Kennedy) (S); 3. Guts (Olivia Rodrigo) (A); 4. "Hot to Go!" (Chappell Roan) (S); 5. "Kaleidoscope" (Chappell Roan) (S); 6. "Red Wine Supernova" (Chappell Roan) (S); 7. "Welcome to My Island" (Caroline Polachek) (S)	**Songwriter of the Year, Non-Classical**: **Theron Thomas**; 1. **"All My Life" (Lil Durk featuring J. Cole) (S)**; 2. **"Been Thinking" (Tyla) (S)**; 3. **"Cheatback" (Chlöe & Future) (T)**; 4. **"How We Roll" (Ciara & Chris Brown) (S)**; 5. **"Make Up Your Mind" (Cordae) (S)**; 6. **"Pretty Girls Walk" (Big Boss Vette) (S)**; 7. **"Seven" (Jung Kook & Latto) (S)**; 8. **"Told Ya" (Chlöe & Missy Elliott) (T)**; 9. **"You and I" (Sekou) (T)**; Edgar Barrera; 1. "Cuestion de Tiempo" (Don Omar) (T); 2. "Falsa Alarma (En Vivo)" (Grupo Firme) (T); 3. "Gucci los Paños" (Karol G) (T); 4. "La Despedida" (Christian Nodal) (T); 5. "Mi Ex Tenía Razón" (Karol G) (T); 6. "Que Vuelvas" (Various Artists) (T); 7. "Un Cumbión Dolido" (Christian Nodal) (T); 8. "un x100to" (Grupo Frontera & Bad Bunny) (T); 9. "Yo Pr1mero" (Rels B) (S); Jessie Jo Dillon; 1. "Buried" (Brandy Clark) (T); 2. "Girl in the Mirror" (Megan Moroney) (T); 3. "Halfway to Hell" (Jelly Roll) (T); 4. "I Just Killed a Man" (Catie Offerman) (S); 5. "Memory Lane" (Old Dominion) (S); 6. "Neon Cowgirl" (Dan + Shay) (T); 7. "Screen" (Hardy) (T); 8. "The Town In Your Heart" (Lori McKenna) (T); 9. "Up Above the Clouds (Cecilia's Song)" (Brandy Clark) (T); Shane McAnally; 1. "Come Back to Me" (Brandy Clark) (S); 2. "Good with Me" (Walker Hayes) (S); 3. "He's Never Gunna Change" (Lauren Daigle) (S); 4. "I Should Have Married You" (Old Dominion) (S); 5. "Independently Owned" (Alex Newell & Original Broadway Cast of Shucked) (S); 6. "Never Grow Up" (Niall Horan) (S); 7. "Start Nowhere" (Sam Hunt) (S); 8. "Walmart" (Sam Hunt) (S); 9. "We Don't Fight Anymore" (Carly Pearce & Chris Stapleton) (S); Justin Tranter; 1. "Gemini Moon" (Reneé Rapp) (T); 2. "Honey! (Are U Coming?)" (Måneskin) (S); 3. "I Want More" (Marisa Davila & Cast of Grease: Rise of the Pink Ladies) (S); 4. "Jersey" (Baby Tate) (S); 5. "A Little Bit Happy" (Talk) (S); 6. "Pretty Girls" (Reneé Rapp) (S); 7. "River" (Miley Cyrus) (S)

=== Pop & Dance/Electronic ===
Pop & Dance/Electronic Field
**Best Pop Solo Performance**: **"Flowers" – Miley Cyrus**; "Paint the Town Red" – Doja Cat; "What Was I Made For?" – Billie Eilish; "Vampire" – Olivia Rodrigo; "Anti-Hero" – Taylor Swift	**Best Pop Duo/Group Performance**: **"Ghost in the Machine" – SZA featuring Phoebe Bridgers**; "Thousand Miles" – Miley Cyrus featuring Brandi Carlile; "Candy Necklace" – Lana Del Rey featuring Jon Batiste; "Never Felt So Alone" – Labrinth featuring Billie Eilish; "Karma" – Taylor Swift featuring Ice Spice
**Best Pop Vocal Album**: **Midnights – Taylor Swift**; Chemistry – Kelly Clarkson; Endless Summer Vacation – Miley Cyrus; Guts – Olivia Rodrigo; - – Ed Sheeran	**Best Dance/Electronic Recording**: **"Rumble" – Skrillex, Fred Again & Flowdan**; **Beam, Elley Duhé, Fred Again & Skrillex, producers; Skrillex, mixer**; "Blackbox Life Recorder 21F" – Aphex Twin; Richard D James, producer; Richard D James, mixer; "Loading" – James Blake; James Blake & Dom Maker, producers; James Blake, mixer; "Higher Than Ever Before" – Disclosure; Cirkut, Guy Lawrence & Howard Lawrence, producers; Guy Lawrence, mixer; "Strong" – Romy & Fred Again; Fred Again, Stuart Price & Romy, producers; Fred Again & Stuart Price, mixers
**Best Pop Dance Recording**: **"Padam Padam" – Kylie Minogue**; **Lostboy, producer; Guy Massey, mixer**; "Baby Don't Hurt Me" – David Guetta, Anne-Marie & Coi Leray; Johnny Goldstein, Toby Green, David Guetta & Mike Hawkins, producers; Serban Ghenea, mixer; "Miracle" – Calvin Harris featuring Ellie Goulding; Burns & Calvin Harris, producers; Calvin Harris, mixer; "One in a Million" – Bebe Rexha & David Guetta; Burns & David Guetta, producers; Serban Ghenea, mixer; "Rush" – Troye Sivan; Styalz Fuego, Novodor & Zhone, producers; Alex Ghenea, mixer	**Best Dance/Electronic Album**: **Actual Life 3 (January 1 – September 9 2022) – Fred Again**; Playing Robots into Heaven – James Blake; For That Beautiful Feeling – The Chemical Brothers; Kx5 – Kx5; Quest for Fire – Skrillex

=== Rock, Metal & Alternative ===
Rock, Metal & Alternative Field
**Best Rock Performance**: **"Not Strong Enough" – Boygenius**; "Sculptures of Anything Goes" – Arctic Monkeys; "More Than a Love Song" – Black Pumas; "Rescued" – Foo Fighters; "Lux Æterna" – Metallica	**Best Metal Performance**: **"72 Seasons" – Metallica**; "Bad Man" – Disturbed; "Phantom of the Opera" – Ghost; "Hive Mind" – Slipknot; "Jaded" – Spiritbox
**Best Rock Song**: **"Not Strong Enough" – Julien Baker, Phoebe Bridgers & Lucy Dacus, songwriters (Boygenius)**; "Angry" – Mick Jagger, Keith Richards & Andrew Watt, songwriters (The Rolling Stones); "Ballad of a Homeschooled Girl" – Daniel Nigro & Olivia Rodrigo, songwriters (Olivia Rodrigo); "Emotion Sickness" – Dean Fertita, Joshua Homme, Michael Shuman, Jon Theodore & Troy Van Leeuwen, songwriters (Queens of the Stone Age); "Rescued" – Dave Grohl, Rami Jaffee, Nate Mendel, Chris Shiflett & Pat Smear, songwriters (Foo Fighters)	**Best Rock Album**: **This Is Why – Paramore**; But Here We Are – Foo Fighters; Starcatcher – Greta Van Fleet; 72 Seasons – Metallica; In Times New Roman... – Queens of the Stone Age
**Best Alternative Music Performance**: **"This Is Why" – Paramore**; "Belinda Says" – Alvvays; "Body Paint" – Arctic Monkeys; "Cool About It" – Boygenius; "A&W" – Lana Del Rey	**Best Alternative Music Album**: **The Record – Boygenius**; The Car – Arctic Monkeys; Did You Know That There's a Tunnel Under Ocean Blvd – Lana Del Rey; Cracker Island – Gorillaz; I Inside the Old Year Dying – PJ Harvey

=== R&B, Rap & Spoken Word Poetry ===
R&B, Rap & Spoken Word Poetry Field
**Best R&B Performance**: **"ICU" – Coco Jones**; "Summer Too Hot" – Chris Brown; "Back to Love" – Robert Glasper featuring Sir & Alex Isley; "How Does It Make You Feel" – Victoria Monét; "Kill Bill" – SZA	**Best Traditional R&B Performance**: **"Good Morning" – PJ Morton featuring Susan Carol**; "Simple" – Babyface featuring Coco Jones; "Lucky" – Kenyon Dixon; "Hollywood" – Victoria Monét featuring Earth, Wind & Fire & Hazel Monét; "Love Language" – SZA
**Best R&B Song**: **"Snooze" – Kenny B. Edmonds, Blair Ferguson, Khris Riddick-Tynes, Solána Rowe & Leon Thomas, songwriters (SZA)**; "Angel" – Halle Bailey, Theron Feemster & Coleridge Tillman, songwriters (Halle Bailey); "Back to Love" – Darryl Andrew Farris, Robert Glasper & Alex Isley, songwriters (Robert Glasper featuring Sir & Alex Isley); "ICU" – Darhyl Camper Jr., Courtney Jones, Raymond Komba & Roy Keisha Rockette, songwriters (Coco Jones); "On My Mama" – Dernst Emile II, Jeff Gitelman, Victoria Monét, Kyla Moscovich, Jamil Pierre & Charles Williams, songwriters (Victoria Monét)	**Best Progressive R&B Album**: **SOS – SZA**; Since I Have a Lover – 6lack; The Love Album: Off the Grid – Diddy; Nova – Terrace Martin and James Fauntleroy; The Age of Pleasure – Janelle Monáe
**Best R&B Album**: **Jaguar II – Victoria Monét**; Girls Night Out – Babyface; What I Didn't Tell You (Deluxe) – Coco Jones; Special Occasion – Emily King; Clear 2: Soft Life (EP) – Summer Walker	**Best Rap Performance**: **"Scientists & Engineers" – Killer Mike featuring André 3000, Future and Eryn Allen Kane**; "The Hillbillies" – Baby Keem featuring Kendrick Lamar; "Love Letter" – Black Thought; "Rich Flex" – Drake & 21 Savage; "Players" – Coi Leray
**Best Melodic Rap Performance**: **"All My Life" – Lil Durk featuring J. Cole**; "Sittin' on Top of the World" – Burna Boy featuring 21 Savage; "Attention" – Doja Cat; "Spin Bout U" – Drake & 21 Savage; "Low" – SZA	**Best Rap Song**: **"Scientists & Engineers" – Andre Benjamin, Paul Beauregard, James Blake, Michael Render, Tim Moore & Dion Wilson, songwriters (Killer Mike featuring André 3000, Future and Eryn Allen Kane)**; "Attention" – Rogét Chahayed, Amala Zandile Dlamini & Ari Starace, songwriters (Doja Cat); "Barbie World" – Isis Naija Gaston, Ephrem Louis Lopez Jr. & Onika Maraj, songwriters (Nicki Minaj & Ice Spice featuring Aqua); "Just Wanna Rock" – Mohamad Camara, Symere Woods & Javier Mercado, songwriters (Lil Uzi Vert); "Rich Flex" – Brytavious Chambers, Isaac "Zac" De Boni, Aubrey Graham, J. Gwin, Anderson Hernandez, Michael "Finatik" Mulé & Shéyaa Bin Abraham-Joseph, songwriters (Drake & 21 Savage)
**Best Rap Album**: **Michael – Killer Mike**; Her Loss – Drake & 21 Savage; Heroes & Villains – Metro Boomin; King's Disease III – Nas; Utopia – Travis Scott	**Best Spoken Word Poetry Album**: **The Light Inside – J. Ivy**; A-You're Not Wrong B-They're Not Either: The Fukc-It Pill Revisited – Queen Sheba; For Your Consideration'24 – The Album – Prentice Powell and Shawn William; Grocery Shopping with My Mother – Kevin Powell; When the Poems Do What They Do – Aja Monet

=== Jazz, Traditional Pop, Contemporary Instrumental & Musical Theater ===
Jazz, Traditional Pop, Contemporary Instrumental & Musical Theater Field
**Best Jazz Performance**: **"Tight" – Samara Joy**; "Movement 18' (Heroes)" – Jon Batiste; "Basquiat" – Lakecia Benjamin; "Vulnerable (Live)" – Adam Blackstone featuring The Baylor Project & Russell Ferranté; "But Not for Me" – Fred Hersch & Esperanza Spalding	**Best Jazz Vocal Album**: **How Love Begins – Nicole Zuraitis**; For Ella 2 – Patti Austin featuring Gordon Goodwin's Big Phat Band; Alive at the Village Vanguard – Fred Hersch & Esperanza Spalding; Lean In – Gretchen Parlato & Lionel Loueke; Mélusine – Cécile McLorin Salvant
**Best Jazz Instrumental Album**: **The Winds of Change – Billy Childs**; The Source – Kenny Barron; Phoenix – Lakecia Benjamin; Legacy: The Instrumental Jawn – Adam Blackstone; Dream Box – Pat Metheny	**Best Large Jazz Ensemble Album**: **Basie Swings the Blues – The Count Basie Orchestra directed by Scotty Barnhart**; The Chick Corea Symphony Tribute – Ritmo – ADDA Simfònica, Josep Vicent, Emilio Solla; Dynamic Maximum Tension – Darcy James Argue's Secret Society; Olympians – Vince Mendoza & Metropole Orkest; The Charles Mingus Centennial Sessions – Mingus Big Band
**Best Latin Jazz Album**: **El Arte del Bolero Vol. 2 – Miguel Zenón & Luis Perdomo**; Quietude – Eliane Elias; My Heart Speaks – Ivan Lins with the Tbilisi Symphony Orchestra; Vox Humana – Bobby Sanabria Multiverse Big Band; Cometa – Luciana Souza & Trio Corrente	**Best Alternative Jazz Album**: **The Omnichord Real Book – Meshell Ndegeocello**; Love in Exile – Arooj Aftab, Vijay Iyer, Shahzad Ismaily; Quality Over Opinion – Louis Cole; SuperBlue: The Iridescent Spree – Kurt Elling, Charlie Hunter, SuperBlue; Live at the Piano – Cory Henry
**Best Traditional Pop Vocal Album**: **Bewitched – Laufey**; To Steve with Love: Liz Callaway Celebrates Sondheim – Liz Callaway; Pieces of Treasure – Rickie Lee Jones; Holidays Around the World – Pentatonix; Only the Strong Survive – Bruce Springsteen; Sondheim Unplugged (The NYC Sessions), Vol. 3 – Various Artists	**Best Contemporary Instrumental Album**: **As We Speak – Béla Fleck, Zakir Hussain, Edgar Meyer featuring Rakesh Chaurasia**; On Becoming – House of Waters; Jazz Hands – Bob James; The Layers – Julian Lage; All One – Ben Wendel
**Best Musical Theater Album**: **Some Like It Hot – Christian Borle, J. Harrison Ghee, Adrianna Hicks & NaTasha Yvette Williams, principal vocalists; Mary-Mitchell Campbell, Bryan Carter, Scott M. Riesett, Charlie Rosen & Marc Shaiman, producers; Scott Wittman, lyricist; Marc Shaiman, composer & lyricist (Original Broadway Cast)**; Kimberly Akimbo – Victoria Clark, principal vocalist; John Clancy, David Stone & Jeanine Tesori, producers; Jeanine Tesori, composer; David Lindsay-Abaire, lyricist (Original Broadway Cast); Parade – Micaela Diamond, Alex Joseph Grayson, Jake Pedersen & Ben Platt, principal vocalists; Jason Robert Brown & Jeffrey Lesser, producers; Jason Robert Brown, composer & lyricist (2023 Broadway Cast); Shucked – John Behlmann, Andrew Durand, Caroline Innerbichler & Alex Newell, principal vocalists; Brandy Clark, Jason Howland, Shane McAnally & Billy Jay Stein, producers; Brandy Clark & Shane McAnally, composers/lyricists (Original Broadway Cast); Sweeney Todd: The Demon Barber of Fleet Street – Annaleigh Ashford & Josh Groban, principal vocalists; Thomas Kail & Alex Lacamoire, producers; Stephen Sondheim, composer & lyricist (2023 Broadway Cast)

=== Country & American Roots ===
Country & American Roots Field
**Best Country Solo Performance**: **"White Horse" – Chris Stapleton**; "In Your Love" – Tyler Childers; "Buried" – Brandy Clark; "Fast Car" – Luke Combs; "The Last Thing on My Mind" – Dolly Parton	**Best Country Duo/Group Performance**: **"I Remember Everything" – Zach Bryan featuring Kacey Musgraves**; "High Note" – Dierks Bentley featuring Billy Strings; "Nobody's Nobody" – Brothers Osborne; "Kissing Your Picture (Is So Cold)" – Vince Gill & Paul Franklin; "Save Me" – Jelly Roll with Lainey Wilson; "We Don't Fight Anymore" – Carly Pearce featuring Chris Stapleton
**Best Country Song**: **"White Horse" – Chris Stapleton & Dan Wilson, songwriters (Chris Stapleton)**; "Buried" – Brandy Clark & Jessie Jo Dillon, songwriters (Brandy Clark); "I Remember Everything" – Zach Bryan & Kacey Musgraves, songwriters (Zach Bryan featuring Kacey Musgraves); "In Your Love" – Tyler Childers & Geno Seale, songwriters (Tyler Childers); "Last Night" – John Byron, Ashley Gorley, Jacob Kasher Hindlin & Ryan Vojtesak, songwriters (Morgan Wallen)	**Best Country Album**: **Bell Bottom Country – Lainey Wilson**; Rolling Up the Welcome Mat – Kelsea Ballerini; Brothers Osborne – Brothers Osborne; Zach Bryan – Zach Bryan; Rustin' in the Rain – Tyler Childers
**Best American Roots Performance**: **"Eve Was Black" – Allison Russell**; "Butterfly" – Jon Batiste; "Heaven Help Us All" – The Blind Boys of Alabama; "Inventing the Wheel" – Madison Cunningham; "You Louisiana Man" – Rhiannon Giddens	**Best Americana Performance**: **"Dear Insecurity" – Brandy Clark featuring Brandi Carlile**; "Friendship" – The Blind Boys of Alabama; "Help Me Make It Through the Night" – Tyler Childers; "King of Oklahoma" – Jason Isbell and the 400 Unit; "The Returner" – Allison Russell
**Best American Roots Song**: **"Cast Iron Skillet" – Jason Isbell, songwriter (Jason Isbell and the 400 Unit)**; "Blank Page" – Michael Trotter Jr. & Tanya Trotter, songwriters (The War and Treaty); "California Sober" – Aaron Allen, William Apostol & Jon Weisberger, songwriters (Billy Strings featuring Willie Nelson); "Dear Insecurity" – Brandy Clark & Michael Pollack, songwriters (Brandy Clark featuring Brandi Carlile); "The Returner" – Drew Lindsay, JT Nero & Allison Russell, songwriters (Allison Russell)	**Best Americana Album**: **Weathervanes – Jason Isbell and the 400 Unit**; Brandy Clark – Brandy Clark; The Chicago Sessions – Rodney Crowell; You're the One – Rhiannon Giddens; The Returner – Allison Russell
**Best Bluegrass Album**: **City of Gold – Molly Tuttle & Golden Highway**; Radio John: Songs of John Hartford – Sam Bush; Lovin' of the Game – Michael Cleveland; Mighty Poplar – Mighty Poplar; Bluegrass – Willie Nelson; Me/And/Dad – Billy Strings	**Best Traditional Blues Album**: **All My Love for You – Bobby Rush**; Ridin' – Eric Bibb; The Soul Side of Sipp – Mr. Sipp; Life Don't Miss Nobody – Tracy Nelson; Teardrops for Magic Slim Live at Rosa's Lounge – John Primer
**Best Contemporary Blues Album**: **Blood Harmony – Larkin Poe**; Death Wish Blues – Samantha Fish and Jesse Dayton; Healing Time – Ruthie Foster; Live in London – Christone "Kingfish" Ingram; LaVette! – Bettye LaVette	**Best Folk Album**: **Joni Mitchell at Newport – Joni Mitchell**; Traveling Wildfire – Dom Flemons; I Only See the Moon – The Milk Carton Kids; Celebrants – Nickel Creek; Jubilee – Old Crow Medicine Show; Seven Psalms – Paul Simon; Folkocracy – Rufus Wainwright
**Best Regional Roots Music Album**: **New Beginnings** – **Buckwheat Zydeco Jr. & The Legendary Ils Sont Partis Band**; **Live: Orpheum Theater Nola** – **Lost Bayou Ramblers & Louisiana Philharmonic Orchestra**; Live at the 2023 New Orleans Jazz & Heritage Festival – Dwayne Dopsie & The Zydeco Hellraisers; Made in New Orleans – New Breed Brass Band; Too Much to Hold – New Orleans Nightcrawlers; Live at the Maple Leaf – The Rumble featuring Chief Joseph Boudreaux Jr.

=== Gospel & Contemporary Christian ===
Gospel & Contemporary Christian Field
**Best Gospel Performance/Song**: **"All Things" – Kirk Franklin**; **Kirk Franklin, songwriter**; "God Is Good" – Stanley Brown featuring Hezekiah Walker, Kierra Sheard & Karen Clark Sheard; Stanley Brown, Karen V Clark Sheard, Kaylah Jiavanni Harvey, Rodney Jerkins, Elyse Victoria Johnson, J Drew Sheard II, Kierra Valencia Sheard & Hezekiah Walker, songwriters; "Feel Alright (Blessed)" – Erica Campbell; Erica Campbell, Warryn Campbell, William Weatherspoon, Juan Winans & Marvin L. Winans, songwriters; "Lord Do It for Me (Live)" – Zacardi Cortez; Marcus Calyen, Zacardi Cortez & Kerry Douglas, songwriters; "God Is" – Melvin Crispell III	**Best Contemporary Christian Music Performance/Song**: **"Your Power" – Lecrae & Tasha Cobbs Leonard**; "Believe" – Blessing Offor; Hank Bentley & Blessing Offor, songwriters; "Firm Foundation (He Won't) [Live]" – Cody Carnes; "Thank God I Do" – Lauren Daigle; Lauren Daigle & Jason Ingram, songwriters; "Love Me Like I Am" – For King & Country featuring Jordin Sparks; "God Problems" – Maverick City Music, Chandler Moore & Naomi Raine; Daniel Bashta, Chris Davenport, Ryan Ellis & Naomi Raine, songwriters
**Best Gospel Album**: **All Things New: Live in Orlando – Tye Tribbett**; I Love You – Erica Campbell; Hymns (Live) – Tasha Cobbs Leonard; The Maverick Way – Maverick City Music; My Truth – Jonathan McReynolds	**Best Contemporary Christian Music Album**: **Church Clothes 4 – Lecrae**; My Tribe – Blessing Offor; Emanuel – Da' T.R.U.T.H.; Lauren Daigle – Lauren Daigle; I Believe – Phil Wickham
**Best Roots Gospel Album**: **Echoes of the South – Blind Boys of Alabama**; Tribute to the King – The Blackwood Brothers Quartet; Songs That Pulled Me Through the Tough Times – Becky Isaacs Bowman; Meet Me at the Cross – Brian Free & Assurance; Shine: The Darker the Night the Brighter the Light – Gaither Vocal Band

=== Latin, Global, African, Reggae & New Age, Ambient or Chant ===
Latin, Global, African, Reggae & New Age, Ambient or Chant Field
**Best Latin Pop Album**: **X Mí (Vol. 1) – Gaby Moreno**; La Cuarta Hoja – Pablo Alborán; Beautiful Humans, Vol. 1 – AleMor; A Ciegas – Paula Arenas; La Neta – Pedro Capó; Don Juan – Maluma	**Best Música Urbana Album**: **Mañana Será Bonito – Karol G**; Saturno – Rauw Alejandro; Data – Tainy
**Best Latin Rock or Alternative Album**: **Vida Cotidiana** – **Juanes**; **De Todas las Flores – Natalia Lafourcade**; Martínez – Cabra; Leche de Tigre – Diamante Eléctrico; EADDA9223 – Fito Páez	**Best Música Mexicana Album (including Tejano)**: **Génesis – Peso Pluma**; Bordado a Mano – Ana Bárbara; La Sánchez – Lila Downs; Motherflower – Flor de Toloache; Amor Como en las Películas de Antes – Lupita Infante
**Best Tropical Latin Album**: **Siembra: 45° Aniversario (En Vivo en el Coliseo de Puerto Rico, 14 de Mayo 2022) – Rubén Blades, Roberto Delgado & Orquesta**; Voy a Ti – Luis Figueroa; Niche Sinfónica – Grupo Niche, Orquesta Sinfónica Nacional de Colombia; Vida – Omara Portuondo; Mimy & Tony – Tony Succar, Mimy Succar; Escalona Nunca se Había Grabado Así – Carlos Vives	**Best Global Music Performance**: **"Pashto" – Béla Fleck, Edgar Meyer & Zakir Hussain featuring Rakesh Chaurasia**; "Shadow Forces" – Arooj Aftab, Vijay Iyer & Shahzad Ismaily; "Alone" – Burna Boy; "Feel" – Davido; "Milagro y Desastre" – Silvana Estrada; "Abundance in Millets" – Falu & Gaurav Shah featuring PM Narendra Modi; "Todo Colores" – Ibrahim Maalouf featuring Cimafunk & Tank and the Bangas
**Best African Music Performance**: **"Water" – Tyla**; "Amapiano" – Asake & Olamide; "City Boys" – Burna Boy; "Unavailable" – Davido featuring Musa Keys; "Rush" – Ayra Starr	**Best Global Music Album**: **This Moment – Shakti**; Epifanías – Susana Baca; History – Bokanté; I Told Them... – Burna Boy; Timeless – Davido
**Best Reggae Album**: **Colors of Royal – Julian Marley & Antaeus**; Born for Greatness – Buju Banton; Simma – Beenie Man; Cali Roots Riddim 2023 – Collie Buddz; No Destroyer – Burning Spear	**Best New Age, Ambient Or Chant Album**: **So She Howls – Carla Patullo featuring Tonality and the Scorchio Quartet**; Aquamarine – Kirsten Agresta-Copely; Moments of Beauty – Omar Akram; Some Kind of Peace (Piano Reworks) – Ólafur Arnalds; Ocean Dreaming Ocean – David Darling & Hans Christian

=== Children's, Comedy, Audio Book Narration & Storytelling, Visual Media & Music Video/Film ===
Children's, Comedy, Audio Book Narration & Storytelling, Visual Media & Music Video/Film Field
**Best Children's Album**: **123 Andrés – We Grow Together Preschool Songs**; Andrew & Polly – Ahhhhh!; Pierce Freelon and Nnenna Freelon – Ancestars; DJ Willy Wow! – Hip Hope for Kids!; Uncle Jumbo – Taste the Sky	**Best Comedy Album**: **What's In a Name? – Dave Chappelle**; I Wish You Would – Trevor Noah; I'm an Entertainer – Wanda Sykes; Selective Outrage – Chris Rock; Someone You Love – Sarah Silverman
**Best Audio Book, Narration & Storytelling Recording**: **The Light We Carry: Overcoming in Uncertain Times – Michelle Obama**; Big Tree – Meryl Streep; Boldly Go: Reflections on a Life of Awe and Wonder – William Shatner; The Creative Act: A Way of Being – Rick Rubin; It's OK to Be Angry About Capitalism – Bernie Sanders	**Best Compilation Soundtrack for Visual Media**: **Barbie the Album – Various Artists**; Aurora – Daisy Jones & the Six; Black Panther: Wakanda Forever – Various Artists; Guardians of the Galaxy, Vol. 3: Awesome Mix, Vol. 3 – Various Artists; Weird: The Al Yankovic Story – "Weird Al" Yankovic
**Best Score Soundtrack Album for Visual Media**: **Oppenheimer – Ludwig Göransson**; The Fabelmans – John Williams; Indiana Jones and the Dial of Destiny – John Williams; Black Panther: Wakanda Forever – Ludwig Göransson; Barbie – Mark Ronson & Andrew Wyatt	**Best Score Soundtrack for Video Games and Other Interactive Media**: **Star Wars Jedi: Survivor – Stephen Barton and Gordy Haab**; Call of Duty: Modern Warfare II – Sarah Schachner; God of War Ragnarök – Bear McCreary; Hogwarts Legacy – Peter Murray, J Scott Rakozy and Chuck Myer; Stray Gods: The Roleplaying Musical – Jess Serro, Tripod and Austin Wintory
**Best Song Written for Visual Media**: **"What Was I Made For?" (from Barbie)**; **Billie Eilish O'Connell & Finneas O'Connell, songwriters (Billie Eilish)**; "Dance the Night" (from Barbie); Caroline Ailin, Dua Lipa, Mark Ronson & Andrew Wyatt, songwriters (Dua Lipa); "Barbie World" (from Barbie); Isis Naija Gaston, Ephrem Louis Lopez Jr. & Onika Maraj, songwriters (Nicki Minaj & Ice Spice featuring Aqua); "Lift Me Up" (from Black Panther: Wakanda Forever); Ryan Coogler, Ludwig Göransson, Robyn Fenty & Temilade Openiyi, songwriters (Rihanna); "I'm Just Ken" (from Barbie); Mark Ronson & Andrew Wyatt, songwriters (Ryan Gosling)
**Best Music Video**: **"I'm Only Sleeping" – (The Beatles)**; **Em Cooper, video director; Jonathan Clyde, Sophie Hilton, Sue Loughlin and Laura Thomas, video producers**; "In Your Love" – Tyler Childers; Bryan Schlam, video director; Kacie Barton, Silas House, Nicholas Robespierre, Ian Thornton and Whitney Wolanin, video producers; "What Was I Made For?" – Billie Eilish; Billie Eilish, video director; Michelle An, Chelsea Dodson and David Moore, video producers; "Count Me Out" – Kendrick Lamar; Dave Free and Kendrick Lamar, video directors; Jason Baum and Jamie Rabineau, video producers; "Rush" – Troye Sivan; Gordon von Steiner, video director; Kelly McGee, video producer	**Best Music Film**: **Moonage Daydream – (David Bowie)**; **Brett Morgen, video director and video producer**; How I'm Feeling Now – (Lewis Capaldi); Joe Pearlman, video director; Sam Bridger, Isabel Davis and Alice Rhodes, video producers; Live from Paris, The Big Steppers Tour – (Kendrick Lamar); Mike Carson, Dave Free and Mark Ritchie, video directors; Cornell Brown, Debra Davis, Jared Heinke and Jamie Rabineau, video producers; I Am Everything – (Little Richard); Lisa Cortés, video director; Caryn Capotosto, Lisa Cortés, Robert Friedman and Liz Yale Marsh, video producers; Dear Mama – (Tupac Shakur); Allen Hughes, video director; Joshua Garcia, Loren Gomez, James Jenkins and Stef Smith, video producers

=== Package, Notes & Historical ===
Package, Notes & Historical Field
**Best Historical Album**: **Written in Their Soul: The Stax Songwriter Demos**; **Robert Gordon, Deanie Parker, Cheryl Pawelski, Michele Smith & Mason Williams, compilation producers; Michael Graves, mastering engineer; Michael Graves, restoration engineer (Various Artists)**; Fragments – Time Out of Mind Sessions (1996–1997): The Bootleg Series, Vol. 17; Steve Berkowitz & Jeff Rosen, compilation producers; Steve Addabbo, Greg Calbi, Steve Fallone, Chris Shaw & Mark Wilder, mastering engineers (Bob Dylan); The Moaninest Moan of Them All: The Jazz Saxophone of Loren McMurray, 1920–1922; Colin Hancock, Meagan Hennessey & Richard Martin, compilation producers; Richard Martin, mastering engineer; Richard Martin, restoration engineer (Various Artists); Playing for the Man at the Door: Field Recordings from the Collection of Mack McCormick, 1958–1971; Jeff Place & John Troutman, compilation producers; Randy LeRoy & Charlie Pilzer, mastering engineers; Mike Petillo & Charlie Pilzer, restoration engineers (Various Artists); Words & Music, May 1965 – Deluxe Edition; Laurie Anderson, Don Fleming, Jason Stern, Matt Sullivan & Hal Willner, compilation producers; John Baldwin, mastering engineer; John Baldwin, restoration engineer (Lou Reed)	**Best Album Notes**: **Written in Their Soul: The Stax Songwriter Demos**; **Robert Gordon & Deanie Parker, album notes writers (Various Artists)**; Evenings at The Village Gate: John Coltrane with Eric Dolphy (Live); Ashley Kahn, album notes writer (John Coltrane & Eric Dolphy); I Can Almost See Houston: The Complete Howdy Glenn; Scott B. Bomar, album notes writer (Howdy Glenn); Mogadishu's Finest: The Al Uruba Sessions; Vik Sohonie, album notes writer (Iftin Band); Playing for the Man at the Door: Field Recordings from the Collection of Mack McCormick, 1958–1971; Jeff Place & John Troutman, album notes writers (Various Artists)
**Best Recording Package**: **Stumpwork**; **Luke Brooks, James Theseus Buck, & Annie Collinge, art directors (Dry Cleaning)**; The Art of Forgetting; Caroline Rose, art director (Caroline Rose); Cadenza 21'; Hsing-Hui Cheng, art director (Ensemble Cadenza 21'); Electrophonic Chronic; Perry Shall, art director (The Arcs); Gravity Falls; iam8bit, art director (Brad Breeck); Migration; Yu Wei, art director (Leaf Yeh)	**Best Boxed or Special Limited Edition Package**: **For The Birds: The Birdsong Project**; **Jeri Heiden & John Heiden, art directors (Various Artists)**; The Collected Works of Neutral Milk Hotel; Jeff Mangum, Daniel Murphy & Mark Ohe, art directors (Neutral Milk Hotel); Gieo; Duy Dao, art director (Ngọt); Inside: Deluxe Box Set; Bo Burnham & Daniel Calderwood, art directors (Bo Burnham); Words & Music, May 1965 – Deluxe Edition; Masaki Koike, art director (Lou Reed)

=== Production, Engineering, Composition & Arrangement ===
Production, Engineering, Composition & Arrangement Field
**Producer of the Year, Classical**: **Elaine Martone**; 1. **Ascenso (Santiago Cañón-Valencia) (A)**; 2. **Berg: Three Pieces from Lyric Suite; Strauss: Suite from Der Rosenkavalier (Franz Welser-Möst & The Cleveland Orchestra) (A)**; 3. **Between Breaths (Third Coast Percussion) (A)**; 4. **Difficult Grace (Seth Parker Woods) (A)**; 5. **Man Up / Man Down (Constellation Men's Ensemble) (A)**; 6. **Prokofiev: Symphony No. 5 (Franz Welser-Möst & The Cleveland Orchestra) (A)**; 7. **Rachmaninoff & Gershwin: Transcriptions by Earl Wild (John Wilson) (A)**; 8. **Sirventés — Music from the Iranian Female Composers Association (Brian Thornton, Katherine Bormann, Alicia Koelz, Eleisha Nelson, Amahl Arulanadam & Nathan Petipas) (A)**; 9. **Walker: Antifonys; Lilacs; Sinfonias Nos. 4 & 5 (Franz Welser-Möst & The Cleveland Orchestra) (A)**; David Frost; 1. The American Project (Yuja Wang, Teddy Abrams, Louisville Orchestra) (A); 2. Arc II — Ravel, Brahms, Shostakovich (Orion Weiss) (A); 3. Blanchard: Champion (Yannick Nézet-Séguin, Latonia Moore, Ryan Speedo Green, Eric Owens, Stephanie Blythe, Metropolitan Opera Chorus & Orchestra) (A); 4. Contemporary American Composers (Riccardo Muti & Chicago Symphony Orchestra) (A); 5. The Guitar Player (Mattias Schulstad) (A); 6. Mysterium (Anne Akiko Meyers, Grant Gershon & Los Angeles Master Chorale) (A); 7. Verdi: Rigoletto (Daniele Rustioni, Piotr Beczala, Quinn Kelsey, Rosa Feola, Varduhi Abrahamyan, Andrea Mastroni, The Metropolitan Opera Chorus & Orchestra) (A); Morten Lindberg; 1. An Old Hall Ladymass (Catalina Vicens & Trio Mediæval) (A); 2. Thoresen: Lyden Av Arktis — La Terra Meravigliosa (Christian Kluxen & Arktisk Filharmoni) (A); 3. The Trondheim Concertos (Sigurd Imsen & Baroque Ensemble of the Trondheim Symphony Orchestra) (A); 4. Yggdrasil (Tove Ramlo-Ystad & Cantus) (A); Dmitriy Lipay; 1. Adès: Dante (Gustavo Dudamel & Los Angeles Philharmonic) (A); 2. Fandango (Gustavo Dudamel, Anne Akiko Meyers & Los Angeles Philharmonic) (A); 3. Price: Symphony No. 4; Dawson: Negro Folk Symphony (Yannick Nézet-Séguin & Philadelphia Orchestra) (A); 4. Rachmaninoff: The Piano Concertos & Paganini Rhapsody (Yuja Wang, Gustavo Dudamel & Los Angeles Philharmonic) (A); 5. Walker: Lyric for Strings; Folksongs for Orchestra; Lilacs for Voice & Orchestra; Dawson: Negro Folk Symphony (Asher Fisch & Seattle Symphony) (A); Brian Pidgeon; 1. Fuchs: Orchestral Works, Vol. 1 (John Wilson & Sinfonia of London) (A); 2. Music for Strings (John Wilson & Sinfonia of London) (A); 3. Nielsen: Violin Concerto; Symphony No. 4 (James Ehnes, Edward Gardner & Bergen Philharmonic Orchestra) (A); 4. Pierre Sancan — A Musical Tribute (Jean-Efflam Bavouzet, Yan Pascal Tortelier & BBC Philharmonic) (A); 5. Poulenc: Orchestral Works (Bramwell Tovey & BBC Concert Orchestra) (A); 6. Rachmaninoff: Symphony No. 3; Vocalise; The Isle of the Dead (John Wilson & Sinfonia of London) (A); 7. Schubert: Symphonies, Vol. 3 (Edward Gardner & City of Birmingham Symphony Orchestra) (A); 8. Shostakovich: Symphonies No. 12 & 15 (John Storgårds & BBC Philharmonic) (A); 9. Tchaikovsky: Orchestral Works (Alpesh Chauhan & BBC Scottish Symphony Orchestra) (A)	**Best Remixed Recording, Non-Classical**: **"Wagging Tongue" (Wet Leg Remix)**; **Wet Leg, remixers (Depeche Mode)**; "Alien Love Call"; BadBadNotGood, remixers (Turnstile & BadBadNotGood featuring Blood Orange); "New Gold" (Dom Dolla Remix); Dom Dolla, remixer (Gorillaz featuring Tame Impala & Bootie Brown); "Reviver" (Totally Enormous Extinct Dinosaurs Remix); Totally Enormous Extinct Dinosaurs, remixer (Lane 8); "Workin' Hard" (Terry Hunter Remix); Terry Hunter, remixer (Mariah Carey)
**Best Immersive Audio Album**: The Diary of Alicia Keys; **George Massenburg & Eric Schilling, immersive mix engineers; Michael Romanowski, immersive mastering engineer; Alicia Keys & Ann Mincieli, immersive producers (Alicia Keys)**; Act 3 (Immersive Edition); Ryan Ulyate, immersive mix engineer; Michael Romanowski, immersive mastering engineer; Ryan Ulyate, immersive producer (Ryan Ulyate); Blue Clear Sky; Chuck Ainlay, immersive mix engineer; Michael Romanowski, immersive mastering engineer; Chuck Ainlay, immersive producer (George Strait); God of War Ragnarök (Original Soundtrack); Eric Schilling, immersive mix engineer; Michael Romanowski, immersive mastering engineer; Kellogg Boynton, Peter Scaturro & Herbert Waltl, immersive producers (Bear McCreary); Silence Between Songs; Aaron Short, immersive mastering engineer (Madison Beer)	**Best Instrumental Composition**: **"Helena's Theme"**; **John Williams, composer (John Williams)**; "Amerikkan Skin"; Lakecia Benjamin, composer (Lakecia Benjamin featuring Angela Davis); "Can You Hear the Music"; Ludwig Göransson, composer (Ludwig Göransson); "Cutey and the Dragon"; Gordon Goodwin & Raymond Scott, composers (Quartet San Francisco featuring Gordon Goodwin's Big Phat Band); "Motion"; Edgar Meyer, composer (Béla Fleck, Edgar Meyer & Zakir Hussain featuring Rakesh Chaurasia)
**Best Engineered Album, Classical**: **Contemporary American Composers**; **David Frost & Charlie Post, engineers; Silas Brown, mastering engineer (Riccardo Muti & Chicago Symphony Orchestra)**; The Blue Hour; Patrick Dillett, Mitchell Graham, Jesse Lewis, Kyle Pyke, Andrew Scheps & John Weston, engineers; Helge Sten, mastering engineer (Shara Nova & A Far Cry); Fandango; Alexander Lipay & Dmitriy Lipay, engineers; Alexander Lipay & Dmitriy Lipay, mastering engineers (Gustavo Dudamel, Anne Akiko Meyers, Gustavo Castillo & Los Angeles Philharmonic); Sanlikol: A Gentleman of Istanbul – Symphony for Strings, Percussion, Piano, Oud, Ney & Tenor; Christopher Moretti & John Weston, engineers; Shauna Barravecchio & Jesse Lewis, mastering engineers (Mehmet Ali Sanlıkol, George Lernis & A Far Cry); Tchaikovsky: Symphony No. 5 & Schulhoff: Five Pieces; Mark Donahue, engineer; Mark Donahue, mastering engineer (Manfred Honeck & Pittsburgh Symphony Orchestra)	**Best Engineered Album, Non-Classical**: **Jaguar II**; **John Kercy, Kyle Mann, Victoria Monét, Patrizio "Teezio" Pigliapoco, Neal H Pogue & Todd Robinson, engineers; Colin Leonard, mastering engineer (Victoria Monét)**; Desire, I Want to Turn Into You; Macks Faulkron, Daniel Harle, Caroline Polachek & Geoff Swan, engineers; Mike Bozzi & Chris Gehringer, mastering engineers (Caroline Polachek); History; Nic Hard, engineer; Dave McNair, mastering engineer (Bokanté); Multitudes; Michael Harris, Robbie Lackritz, Joseph Lorge & Blake Mills, engineers (Feist); The Record; Owen Lantz, Will Maclellan, Catherine Marks, Mike Mogis, Bobby Mota, Kaushlesh "Garry" Purohit & Sarah Tudzin, engineers; Pat Sullivan, mastering engineer (Boygenius)
**Best Arrangement, Instrumental or A Cappella**: **"Folsom Prison Blues"**; **John Carter Cash, Tommy Emmanuel, Markus Illko, Janet Robin & Roberto Luis Rodriguez, arrangers (The String Revolution featuring Tommy Emmanuel)**; "Angels We Have Heard on High"; Nkosilathi Emmanuel Sibanda, arranger (Just 6); "Can You Hear the Music"; Ludwig Göransson, arranger (Ludwig Göransson); "I Remember Mingus"; Hilario Durán, arranger (Hilario Durán and His Latin Jazz Big Band featuring Paquito D'Rivera); "Paint It Black"; Esin Aydingoz, Chris Bacon, Alana Da Fonseca, Mick Jagger, & Keith Richards, arrangers (Wednesday Addams)	**Best Arrangement, Instrumental and Vocals**: **"In the Wee Small Hours of the Morning"**; **Erin Bentlage, Jacob Collier, Sara Gazarek, Johnaye Kendrick & Amanda Taylor, arrangers (säje featuring Jacob Collier)**; "April in Paris"; Gordon Goodwin, arranger (Patti Austin featuring Gordon Goodwin's Big Phat Band); "Com Que Voz (Live)"; John Beasley & Maria Mendes, arrangers (Maria Mendes featuring John Beasley & Metropole Orkest); "Fenestra"; Godwin Louis, arranger (Cécile McLorin Salvant); "Lush Life"; Kendric McCallister, arranger (Samara Joy)

=== Classical ===
Classical Field
**Best Orchestral Performance**: **Adès: Dante**; **Gustavo Dudamel, conductor (Los Angeles Philharmonic)**; Bartók: Concerto for Orchestra; Four Pieces; Karina Canellakis, conductor (Netherlands Radio Philharmonic Orchestra); Price: Symphony No. 4; Dawson: Negro Folk Symphony; Yannick Nézet-Séguin, conductor (The Philadelphia Orchestra); Scriabin: Symphony No. 2; The Poem of Ecstasy; JoAnn Falletta, conductor (Buffalo Philharmonic Orchestra); Stravinsky: The Rite of Spring; Esa-Pekka Salonen, conductor (San Francisco Symphony)	**Best Opera Recording**: **Blanchard: Champion**; **Yannick Nézet-Séguin, conductor; Ryan Speedo Green, Latonia Moore & Eric Owens; David Frost, producer (The Metropolitan Opera Orchestra; The Metropolitan Opera Chorus)**; Corigliano: The Lord of Cries; Gil Rose, conductor; Anthony Roth Costanzo, Kathryn Henry, Jarrett Ott & David Portillo; Gil Rose, producer (Boston Modern Orchestra Project & Odyssey Opera Chorus); Little: Black Lodge; Timur; Andrew McKenna Lee & David T. Little, producers (The Dime Museum; Isaura String Quartet)
**Best Choral Performance**: **Saariaho: Reconnaissance**; **Nils Schweckendiek, conductor (Uusinta Ensemble; Helsinki Chamber Choir)**; Carols After a Plague; Donald Nally, conductor (The Crossing); The House of Belonging; Craig Hella Johnson, conductor (Miró Quartet; Conspirare); Ligeti: Lux Aeterna; Ragnar Bohlin, choral director (San Francisco Symphony Chorus); Rachmaninoff: All-Night Vigil; Steven Fox, conductor (The Clarion Choir)	**Best Chamber Music/Small Ensemble Performance**: **Rough Magic – Roomful of Teeth**; American Stories – Anthony McGill & Pacifica Quartet; Beethoven for Three: Symphony No. 6, Pastorale and Op. 1, No. 3 – Yo-Yo Ma, Emanuel Ax & Leonidas Kavakos; Between Breaths – Third Coast Percussion; Uncovered, Vol. 3: Coleridge-Taylor Perkinson, William Grant Still & George Walker – Catalyst Quartet
**Best Classical Instrumental Solo**: **The American Project – Yuja Wang; Teddy Abrams, conductor (Louisville Orchestra)**; John Luther Adams: Darkness and Scattered Light – Robert Black; Akiho: Cylinders – Andy Akiho; Difficult Grace – Seth Parker Woods; Of Love – Curtis Stewart	**Best Classical Vocal Solo**: **Walking in the Dark**; **Julia Bullock, soloist; Christian Reif, conductor (Philharmonia Orchestra)**; Because; Reginald Mobley, soloist; Baptiste Trotignon, pianist; Broken Branches; Karim Sulayman, soloist; Sean Shibe, accompanist; 40@40; Laura Strickling, soloist; Daniel Schlosberg, pianist; Rising; Lawrence Brownlee, soloist; Kevin J. Miller, pianist
**Best Classical Compendium**: **Passion for Bach and Coltrane**; **Alex Brown, Harlem Quartet, Imani Winds, Edward Perez, Neal Smith & A.B. Spellman; Silas Brown & Mark Dover, producers**; Fandango; Anne Akiko Meyers; Gustavo Dudamel, conductor; Dmitriy Lipay, producer; Julius Eastman, Vol. 3: If You're So Smart, Why Aren't You Rich?; Christopher Rountree, conductor; Lewis Pesacov, producer; Mazzoli: Dark with Excessive Bright; Peter Herresthal; Tim Weiss, conductor; Hans Kipfer, producer; Sardinia; Chick Corea; Chick Corea & Bernie Kirsh, producers; Sculptures; Andy Akiho; Andy Akiho & Sean Dixon, producers; Zodiac Suite; Aaron Diehl Trio & The Knights; Eric Jacobsen, conductor; Aaron Diehl & Eric Jacobsen, producers	**Best Contemporary Classical Composition**: **Montgomery: Rounds – Jessie Montgomery, composer (Awadagin Pratt, A Far Cry & Roomful of Teeth)**; Adès: Dante – Thomas Adès, composer (Gustavo Dudamel & Los Angeles Philharmonic); Akiho: In That Space, At That Time – Andy Akiho, composer (Andy Akiho, Ankush Kumar Bahl & Omaha Symphony); Brittelle: Psychedelics – William Brittelle, composer (Roomful of Teeth); Mazzoli: Dark with Excessive Bright – Missy Mazzoli, composer (Peter Herresthal, James Gaffigan & Bergen Philharmonic)

== Special merit awards ==
=== MusiCares Person of the Year ===
MusiCares Person of the Year is a charity award celebrating an artist's creative achievements and their dedication to philanthropy.

- Jon Bon Jovi

=== Lifetime Achievement Awards ===
- Donna Summer
- Gladys Knight
- Laurie Anderson
- N.W.A
- Tammy Wynette
- The Clark Sisters

=== Grammy Trustees Award ===
- Peter Asher
- DJ Kool Herc
- Joel Katz

=== Technical Grammy Award ===
- Tom Kobayashi
- Tom Scott

=== Grammy Music Educator Award ===
- Annie Ray

=== Dr. Dre Global Impact Award ===
- Jay-Z
- Mariah Carey
- Lenny Kravitz

=== Best Song for Social Change ===
- "Refugee" – K'naan, Gerald Eaton & Steve McEwan

== Multiple nominations and awards ==
The following received multiple awards:

Four:

- Phoebe Bridgers

Three:

- Boygenius
- Killer Mike
- Victoria Monét
- SZA
- Zakir Hussain

Two:

- Fred Again
- André 3000
- Jack Antonoff
- Miley Cyrus
- Billie Eilish
- Béla Fleck
- Jason Isbell
- Lecrae
- Finneas O'Connell
- Paramore
- Taylor Swift

The following received multiple nominations:

Nine:

- SZA

Seven:

- Phoebe Bridgers
- Serban Ghenea
- Victoria Monét

Six:

- Jack Antonoff
- Jon Batiste
- Brandy Clark
- Boygenius
- Miley Cyrus
- Billie Eilish
- Ludwig Göransson
- Olivia Rodrigo
- Taylor Swift

== In Memoriam ==
The following individuals were included a montage during the In Memoriam performance at the ceremony. An expanded list of those who died during the previous year was included on the Grammy website.

- Tony Bennett
- Harry Belafonte
- Astrud Gilberto
- Robbie Robertson
- Wayne Shorter
- Bill Lee
- Jerry Moss
- Les McCann
- Peter Schickele
- Tom Smothers
- Carla Bley
- André Watts
- Denny Laine
- Dick Waterman
- Chita Rivera
- Jimmy Buffett
- Shane MacGowan
- Mary Weiss
- Jane Birkin
- Wayne Kramer
- Jim Ladd
- Andy Rourke
- David Lindley
- Ryuichi Sakamoto
- David Jolicoeur
- Randy Meisner
- Charlie Robison
- Michael Rhodes
- Gary Rossington
- María Jiménez
- Melinda Wilson
- Gary Wright
- Sinéad O'Connor
- Burt Bacharach
- Cynthia Weil
- Seymour Stein
- Terry Kirkman
- Phil Quartararo
- George Winston
- Jaquelyne Ledent-Vilain
- Charlie Monk
- Menahem Pressler
- Melanie
- Ahmad Jamal
- Clarence Avant
- Rudolph Isley
- Jean Knight
- Sixto Rodriguez
- Marlena Shaw
- Jerry Bradley
- Russell Batiste Jr.
- Jeffrey Foskett
- Rita Lee
- Royal Blakeman
- Bobby Caldwell
- Aaron Spears
- DJ Mark the 45 King
- Gangsta Boo
- Chris Strachwitz
- Kris L. Claver
- Magoo
- Kendall A. Minter
- Gordon Lightfoot
- Tina Turner
