= Dreambox (disambiguation) =

Dreambox is a Linux-powered DVB digital satellite and cable decoder set-top box.

Dreambox may also refer to:

- "Dreambox", a song by The Frogs from their 1996 album My Daughter the Broad
- DreamBox (company), an educational software service provider

== See also ==
- Dream Box, a 2023 studio album by Pat Metheny
