= The Poet Who Sat by the Door =

2022 album by J. Ivy

Studio album by J. Ivy
- Released: September 2022
- Genre: Spoken word
- Length: 50:22
- Labels: Word & Soul

J. Ivy chronology
Catching Dreams: Live at Fort Knox Chicago (2021)	The Poet Who Sat by the Door (2022)	The Light Inside (2023)

The Poet Who Sat by the Door is an album by the American spoken word poet J. Ivy, released in September 2022. At the 65th Annual Grammy Awards in February 2023 it became the first recording to win the Grammy Award for Best Spoken Word Poetry Album, a category J. Ivy had campaigned to create as a Recording Academy trustee. The win also made him the first poet to receive a Grammy since Maya Angelou.

== Background and title ==
J. Ivy spent roughly six years advocating for a Grammy category devoted to poetry, separate from the spoken word category that had come to be dominated by celebrity audiobooks; the Recording Academy announced the new category in June 2022, and this album was released that September.

The title alludes to Sam Greenlee's 1969 novel The Spook Who Sat by the Door, whose protagonist works inside an institution to change it from within — a parallel J. Ivy drew to his own position gathering information on behalf of poets while serving inside the Recording Academy.

== Content ==
The album sets spoken word performances over musical production, with contributions from Sir the Baptist. Guests include John Legend, Slick Rick, PJ Morton, BJ the Chicago Kid, Ledisi, Musiq Soulchild, Ursula Rucker, Omari Hardwick, Abiodun Oyewole of the Last Poets, and the singer-songwriter Tarrey Torae. The track "Running" features vocals by John Legend. J. Ivy has said he recorded the album in about two months, after spending two years working on the documentary series jeen-yuhs: A Kanye Trilogy.

== Reception and accolades ==
The Poet Who Sat by the Door won Best Spoken Word Poetry Album at the 65th Annual Grammy Awards on February 5, 2023, the first time the award was presented. Other nominees in the category included Amanda Gorman, Malcolm-Jamal Warner, E. Ethelbert Miller, and Amir Sulaiman. Accepting the award, J. Ivy said, "Let it be known, this is for the poets y'all."

== Track listing ==
No.	Title	Featured performer(s)
1.	"Listen"	Sir the Baptist, Abiodun Oyewole
2.	"Running"	John Legend, Verse, Slick Rick
3.	"Lay Down"	Tarrey Torae, Ursula Rucker, Omari Hardwick
4.	"Text Sex"	
5.	"Fire"	Church PPL
6.	"A Mile in His Soul"	Tarrey Torae
7.	"Not of This World"	
8.	"Without You"	BJ the Chicago Kid
9.	"Learn You a Lesson"	Tarrey Torae, Sunni Patterson, PJ Morton
10.	"I See You"	
11.	"Buffalo Soldier"	Yaw
12.	"Beauty of the Journey"	
13.	"Vibrations II"	
14.	"Pass the Plate"	Ledisi, Musiq Soulchild, Church PPL
