= Cornelia Lampton =

American pianist and music educator

Cornella Lampton
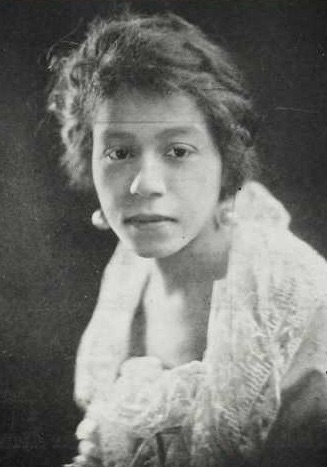
- Cornella Lampton, from the 1924 Howard University yearbook.
- Born: Cornella Derrick Lampton
- Died: August 9, 1928; Chicago
- Other names: Cornelia Lampton, Cornelia Lampton Forrest, Cornelia Lampton Dawson
- Occupation: Musician
- Spouse: William Levi Dawson (m. 1927)

Cornella Derrick Lampton (1896 – August 9, 1928), later Cornella Lampton Dawson, was an American pianist and music educator. She was the first woman to earn a bachelor's degree in music at Howard University.

== Early life and education ==
Cornella Derrick Lampton was from Greenville, Mississippi, the youngest daughter of clergyman Edward Wilkinson Lampton and Lula M. Lampton. The family moved to Chicago after one of her sisters demanded to be addressed as "Miss Lampton" by the phone company, and the argument escalated to threats against the family.

She was the first woman to earn a bachelor's degree at Howard University's Conservatory of Music, graduating in 1914. She attended the Chicago Musical College, where she studied piano with Alexander Raab and Percy Grainger, and from 1925 to 1927 pursued further studies in piano with James Friskin, on a scholarship at the Juilliard Musical Foundation.

== Career ==
Cornella Lampton performed as a pianist in recitals and on radio programs, and taught piano. She was also music editor of the Chicago Whip. She was a member of the National Association of Negro Musicians, and the Chicago Music Association. In 1927, she spoke and played at the 137th Street YWCA in New York, giving a program on "song and folk song."

== Personal life and legacy ==
Cornella Lampton married composer and musician William Levi Dawson in May 1927. She died in August 1928, aged 32, in Chicago. Reports ascribed her death to complications after an appendectomy. Her remains were buried in Greenville. One of her students, Vivienne Shurland, established the Cornelia Lampton Scholarship Fund in her memory, for music students at Howard University.
