= Negro Folk Symphony =

1934 composition by William L Dawson (revised 1952)

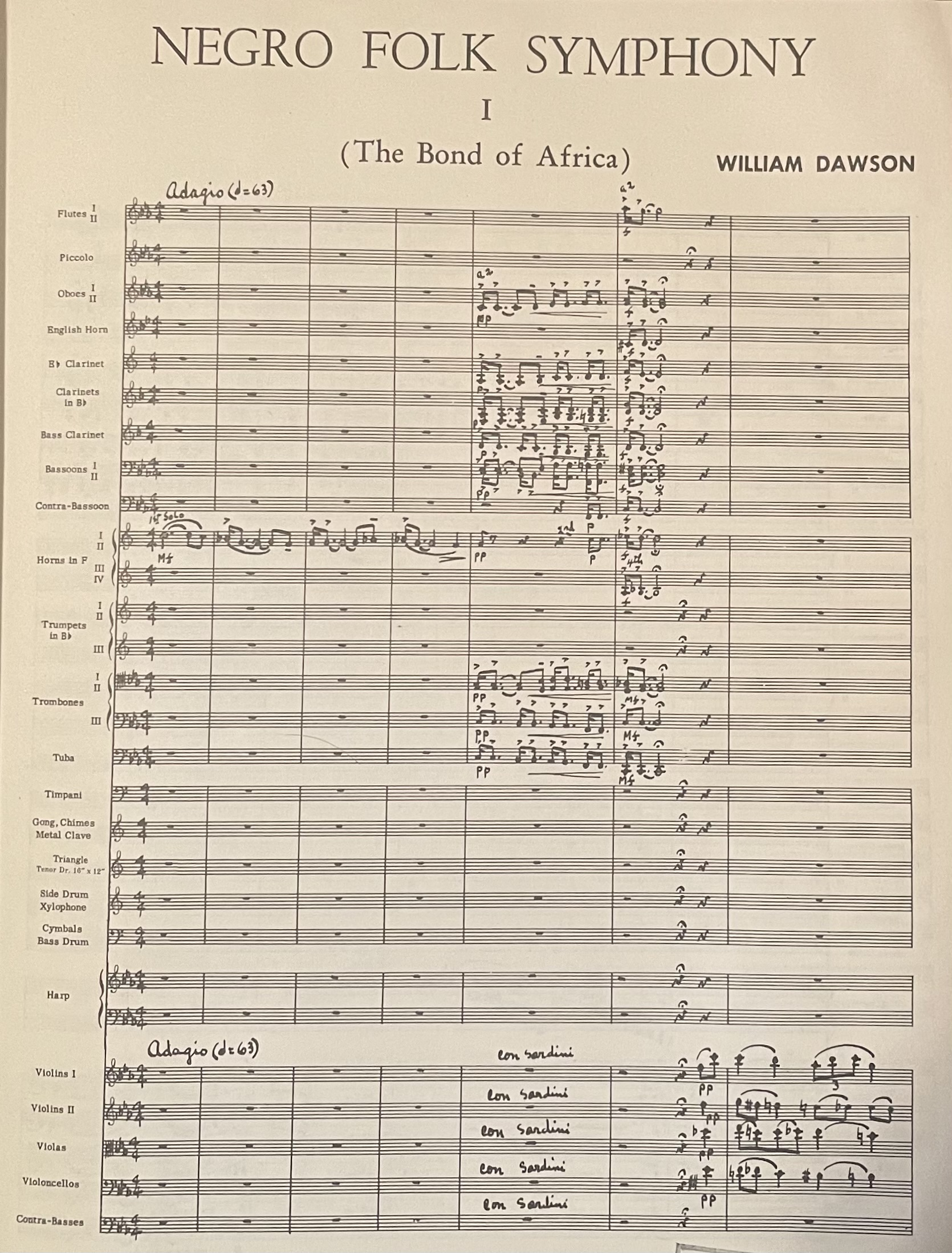
Negro Folk Symphony. Sheet music. Courtesy of Shawnee Press, Inc., 2023.

The Negro Folk Symphony is a symphony composed by William L. Dawson in 1934 and revised in 1952. Leopold Stokowski and the Philadelphia Orchestra debuted the Negro Folk Symphony on November 14, 16, and 17, 1934, with a follow-up performance at New York's Carnegie Hall on November 20.

It was recorded by the Detroit Symphony Orchestra conducted by Neeme Järvi in 2001. A recording by the Vienna Radio Symphony Orchestra and conducted by Arthur Fagen was released in June 2020.

== Composition ==
Dawson began working on his Symphony No. 1 In the late 1920s while living in Chicago. The initial four performances of Dawson's symphony by a major orchestra made him only the third African American composer, after William Grant Still in 1931 and Florence Price in 1933, to achieve such a milestone. Audiences responded enthusiastically, breaking tradition by applauding after the second movement and giving standing ovations at the symphony's conclusion. Critics, both Black and white, praised the work—a rare honor for any new American composition, especially by a Black composer. Despite its initial success and critical acclaim, the Negro Folk Symphony, like many works by Black composers, soon faded from the spotlight.

The work consists of three movements:

1. The Bond of Africa
2. Hope in the Night
3. O, Le' Me Shine, Shine Like a Morning Star!

== Title ==
While the word "Negro" might feel outdated today, but for Dawson and many of his generation, it held deep pride and respect. Even though preferences had shifted by the time of his death in 1990, Dawson preferred this term, finding "Black" too narrow to fully reflect his heritage.

As for "folk" in the symphony's title, Dawson was not the first to incorporate folk songs into symphonic music for the concert stage. He often pointed to composers like Tchaikovsky and Brahms, who also drew from their nations' folk traditions. Antonín Dvořák, in particular, served as a major influence on Dawson, as his Symphony No. 9, From the New World, famously drew on African American musical themes. Listeners who know Dvořák's symphony may hear Dawson's nod to it within the Negro Folk Symphony.

Dawson's approach to folk music in the symphony, however, is entirely his own. In his 1934 program notes, he highlighted three spirituals he cherished from childhood: "Oh, My Little Soul Gwine Shine Like a Star" (or "Dig My Grave"), "O Le' Me Shine", and "Hallelujah, Lord, I Been Down into the Sea". These are not widely known spirituals, but Dawson's artful integration of each into the symphony creates a seamless unity, where folk tunes and symphonic structure blend into a singular, cohesive form.

== Revision ==
During 1952–53, Dawson embarked on a tour across West Africa, spending several weeks immersing himself in the local music and capturing recordings that profoundly influenced him. When he returned to the United States, he infused these new inspirations into a substantial revision of his symphony, enhancing and expanding upon the original work, which had already garnered acclaim. This revised version is the one commonly performed today and is available in professional recordings. In recent years, particularly after the rise of the Black Lives Matter movement, the Negro Folk Symphony has seen a resurgence in performances as orchestras increasingly recognize the importance of works by Black composers from both the past and present.
