= J. Ivy =

American spoken word artist

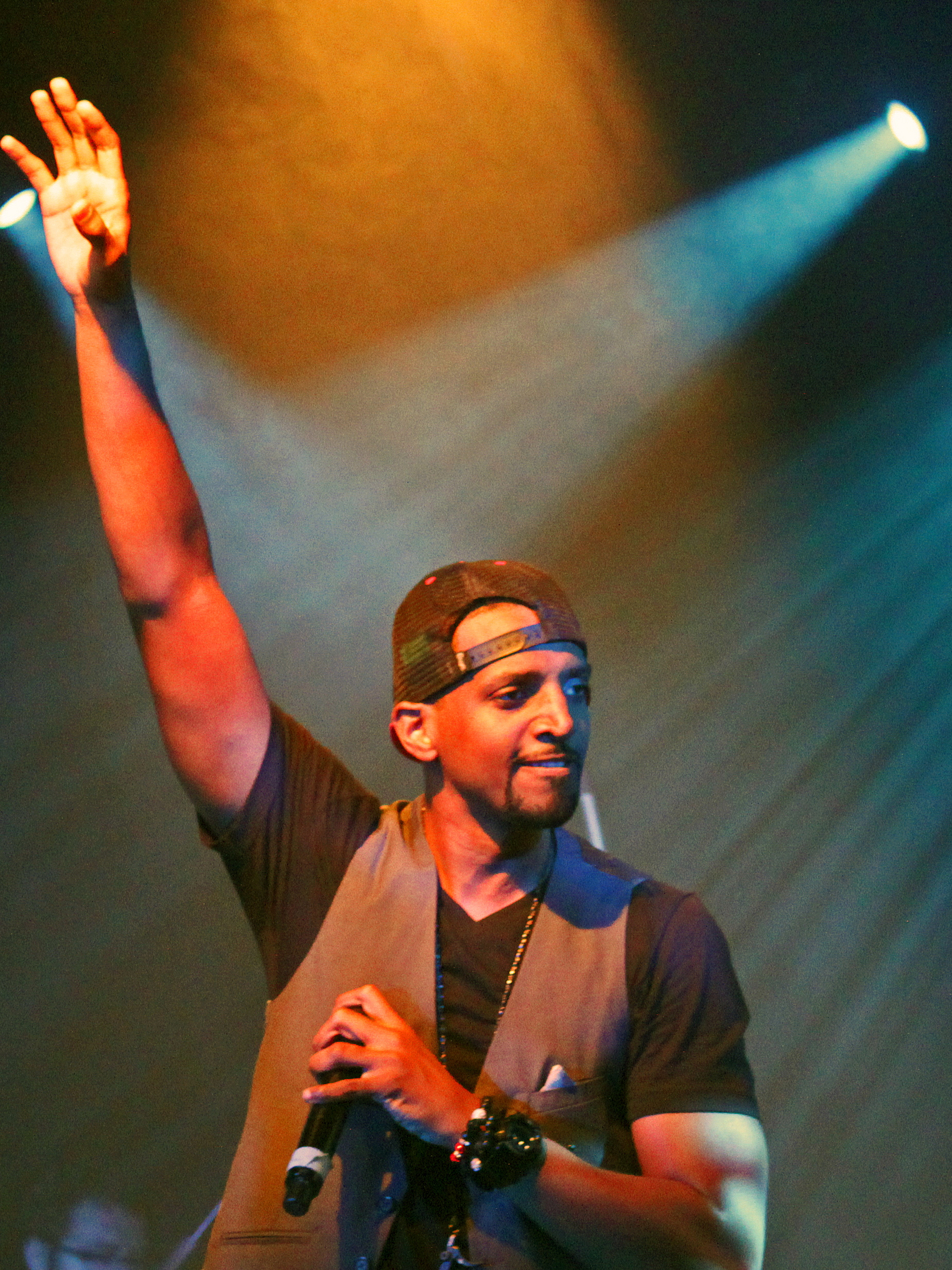
- J. Ivy performing "HERE I AM" Book Concert in New York City in 2012

Background information
- Born: James Ivy Richardson II; March 3, 1976 (age 50); Chicago, Illinois, U.S.
- Education: Illinois State University (BA)
- Genre: Spoken word
- Occupations: Poet; writer; author

James Ivy Richardson II (born March 3, 1976) is an American performance poet, spoken word artist, songwriter, and author. He won his first Grammy Award in 2023 with his sixth album, The Poet Who Sat by the Door.

Richardson is a three-time HBO Def Poet and is known for his performance on Kanye West's debut album The College Dropout (2004), which featured him on the song "Never Let Me Down" along with Jay-Z. He received an NAACP Image Award for his writing and on-camera narration of the BET documentary Muhammad Ali: The People's Champ.

== Early life and education ==
J. Ivy was born March 3, 1976, as James Ivy Richardson II in Chicago, Illinois to James Ivy Richardson Sr. and Pamela Richardson. His father was a disc jockey and on-air personality who went by Jim Richards and hosted the morning hour show on radio station WVON. Pamela Richardson was a registered nurse.

J. Ivy grew up on Chicago's South side with his family until the age of 14 before moving to the South suburbs of Chicago, where he attended Rich Central High School in Olympia Fields, Illinois. Ivy discovered his poetry talent during his junior year when his English teacher asked him to perform a piece he had written for a routine homework assignment. He performed in front of the student body and received a standing ovation. J. was heavily influenced by his mother, who supported his budding talent by encouraging him to continue writing and publish his burgeoning body of work. After his successful school performance, J took his poetry passion as a serious hobby and began writing and performing regularly.

== Music career ==
J. Ivy attended Illinois State University, where he became known on campus as "The Poet" and delved deeper into the art form. After college, J. Ivy returned to Chicago and frequently performed on the local arts circuit. As his popularity grew, J. Ivy was featured several times on Chicago's WGCI radio station and later became the host of "Rituals" (from 1997 to 2000), the most popular poetry night in Chicago and perhaps the nation at that time. He was eventually asked to come on Russell Simmons' Def Poetry Jam on HBO. He received a standing ovation for his performance of "I Need to Write" and was invited back for two encore appearances in later seasons where he performed his signature poems "Dear Father" and "Never Let Me Down".

Fellow Chicagoan Kanye West heard about J. Ivy from mutual friends while he was working on his debut album The College Dropout for Roc-A-Fella Records. He contacted Ivy and offered him the opportunity to be on the song, "Never Let Me Down" which also featured Jay-Z. The College Dropout album earned a Grammy Award for Best Rap Album. The night J. Ivy recorded his verse on "Never Let Me Down", he heard music from a singer named John Stephens. Ivy was so inspired by Stephens' music that he began to call him John Legend. J. Ivy is also featured in the first episode of the Kanye three part documentary Jeen-yuhs.

His distinct hip-hop poetic style caught the attention of many who were not accustomed to hearing poetry incorporated into music in this manner which led him to collaborating with many artists including John Legend, Estelle, Slum Village, Maurice Brown, Smoke DZA, and more. On October 26, 2010, J. Ivy released his second studio album HERE I AM, which features guest artists Abiodun Oyewole of the Last Poets, Jessica Care Moore, Jesse Boykins III, Blitz the Ambassador, Chris Rob, Amanda Seales, Mikkey Halsted, and more.

In 2014, J. Ivy released a mixtape titled Diggin' in the Papes Vol. 1, which features a host of collaborative records Ivy has created with hip-hop artists and producers like Crooked I, the Cool Kids, Ski Beatz, Slum Village, Carl Thomas, Tall Black Guy, and more.

In 2017, J. Ivy released his third studio album, My Daddy's Records, an album created for his book Dear Father: Breaking the Cycle of Pain.

J. Ivy is currently the Chicago Chapter President of the Recording Academy and is the first spoken-word artist to hold a Chapter President seat in the history of the Recording Academy.

== Literary career ==
In 2012, J. Ivy followed up his album HERE I AM with the release of his book HERE I AM: Then & Now, a compilation of the album's lyrics, stories regarding the inspiration for the album, and additional poetry. In January 2014, J. Ivy signed a book deal with Beyond Words Publishing, an imprint of Atria Books & Simon & Schuster, for the January 2015 release of his new book Dear Father: Breaking the Cycle of Pain, which is based on J. Ivy's poem "Dear Father" (as seen on HBO's Def Poetry Jam).

== Advertising and voice-over work ==
Ivy's voice-over work has included NBC Sunday Night Football, the NBA draft and the US Open, and he has appeared in a national AARP advertisement. In 2018 he was featured in Allstate's "Pillars & Poetry" tour of historically black colleges and universities, which included a student spoken word competition. In 2023 he became a spokesperson for Bulleit bourbon.

== Charity and community involvement ==
J. Ivy supports programs that bring arts into the school system. He is a regular performer in Chicago Public Schools. J. Ivy was a guest speaker/performer at Deepak Chopra's 2012 Annual Sages & Scientists Symposium and was the official MC for the 2013 & 2014 edition. Additionally, J. Ivy has conducted poetry workshops and given performances for Reading Is Fundamental, The Kanye West Foundation, and Steve Harvey's Mentoring Camp For Young Men, where he presented his Dear Father Initiative, which teaches the power of forgiveness and promotes social emotional healing through the exercise of writing and journaling.

== Film and television appearances ==
J. Ivy has appeared on many programs and series, including: ER, The Martha Stewart Show, ABC's BCS Selection Show, ABC's All-America Team Show, ABC's FedEx Orange Bowl Championship Game, ABC's Monday Night Football, ABC's NBA Finals, Russell Simmons' Def Poetry Jam on HBO, HBO's Bob Costas Now, HBO Boxing, MTV's Who's Got Game, MTV's 2004 New Year's Eve Bash (2004), MTV's Black History Month Special (2004), MTV's My Block, VH-1's Best Year Ever (2005), B.E.T.'s Lyric Café, BET's Black Carpet Series, B.E.T.'s Harlem Nights, the independent film, Backstabbers (1999), ESPN's 2015 Scripps National Spelling Bee, and B.E.T.'s "Ali: The People's Champ, which won an NAACP Image Award. In 2018 Ivy's national T.V. commercial for AARP premiered on Super Bowl Sunday during the episode of NBC's This Is Us and has run through 2019. In January 2019 J. Ivy wrote for, starred in, and narrated B.E.T.'s documentary Martin: The Legacy of a King. He was also featured in Episode 1 of AMC's Hip-Hop: The Songs that Shook America.

== Personal life ==
After dating for six years, J. Ivy married singer-songwriter Tarrey Torae, on September 4, 2005, in Chicago, Illinois.

== Awards and nominations ==
Award	Year	Nominee / work	Category	Result	Ref.
Grammy Awards	2022	Catching Dreams: Live at Fort Knox Chicago	Best Spoken Word Album	Nominated	
Grammy Awards	2023	The Poet Who Sat by the Door	Best Spoken Word Poetry Album	Won	
Grammy Awards	2023	The Urban Hymnal (as executive producer; album by Tennessee State University Aristocrat of Bands)	Best Roots Gospel Album	Won	
Grammy Awards	2024	The Light Inside	Best Spoken Word Poetry Album	Won	
Grammy Awards	2027	"47th Street"	Best R&B Collaboration or Duo/Group Performance	Pending	

== Discography ==
=== Studio albums ===
- Here I Am (2010)
- My Daddy's Records (2017)
- Catching Dreams (2020)
- The Poet Who Sat by the Door (2022)
- The Light Inside (2023)

=== Live albums ===
- Catching Dreams: Live at Fort Knox Chicago (2021)
