= Alone (Burna Boy song) =

Song by Burna Boy

from the album Black Panther: Wakanda Forever – Music from and Inspired By
- Released: 4 November 2022
- Recorded: 2022
- Genre: Afrobeats
- Length: 3:35
- Label: Roc Nation; Def Jam; Hollywood
- Songwriters: Damini Ogulu; Ludwig Göransson; Peace Oredope; Austin Iwar
- Producers: Ludwig Göransson; P.Priime; Tay Iwar

"Alone" is a song by Nigerian singer and songwriter Burna Boy, released on 4 November 2022, as part of the soundtrack album Black Panther: Wakanda Forever – Music from and Inspired By. The song was written by Burna Boy.

"Alone" received widespread acclaim for its emotional depth, vocal delivery, and the seamless fusion of Afrobeats with cinematic production. It is regarded as one of the standout tracks on the soundtrack album.

== Background and release ==
In 2022, Burna Boy was announced as one of the African artists contributing to the soundtrack of Black Panther: Wakanda Forever. The soundtrack aimed to showcase diverse musical influences, particularly from African artists, to reflect themes of heritage, loss, and strength within the film.

"Alone" was released globally on November 4, 2022, along with the full soundtrack album under Marvel Music and Hollywood Records.

== Accolades ==
Year	Awards ceremony	Award description(s)	Results
2023	The Headies	Best Recording of the Year	Nominated
2023	The Headies	Songwriter of the Year (Damini Ebunoluwa Ogulu, Austin Iornongu Iwar Jr., Peace Oredope, and Ludwig Göransson for "Alone")	Nominated
2024	Grammy Awards	Best Global Music Performance	Nominated

== Charts ==
Chart performance for "Alone"
Chart (2022)	Peak position
Canada Hot 100 (Billboard)	73
France (SNEP)	19
Global 200 (Billboard)	143
Ireland (IRMA)	50
Netherlands (Single Top 100)	58
Sweden (Sverigetopplistan)	33
Portugal (AFP)	97
Switzerland (Schweizer Hitparade)	45
UK Singles (Official Charts)	28
UK Hip Hop/R&B (Official Charts)	12
UK Afrobeats (OCC)	1
US Rhythmic Airplay (Billboard)	2
US World Digital Song Sales (Billboard)	3

== Certifications ==
Region	Certification	Certified units/sales
France (SNEP)	Gold	100,000^{‡}
New Zealand (RMNZ)	Gold	15,000^{‡}
Nigeria (TCSN)	Platinum	100,000^{‡}
Portugal (AFP)	Gold	12,000^{‡}
United Kingdom (BPI)	Silver	200,000^{‡}
United States (RIAA)	Gold	500,000^{‡}
^{‡} Sales+streaming figures based on certification alone.
