= Heart on My Sleeve (Ghostwriter977 song) =

2023 song with AI vocals of Drake and the Weeknd

Song by Ghostwriter977 with AI vocals from Drake and the Weeknd
- Released: April 4, 2023
- Genre: Hip hop
- Length: 2:16
- Songwriter: Ghostwriter977
- Producer: Ghostwriter977 (Note: On the song's intro, an unauthorized producer tag by Metro Boomin can be heard before Drake's chorus.)

"Heart on My Sleeve" (stylized in lowercase) is a song written and produced by TikTok user Ghostwriter977, with vocals made to resemble Canadian musicians Drake and the Weeknd through the use of artificial intelligence (AI). The song was self-released on April 4, 2023, on various streaming platforms like Apple Music, Spotify and YouTube.

Notable for its AI usage, "Heart on My Sleeve" was taken down by Universal Music Group (UMG). The song had accrued attention on TikTok and had garnered millions of views across a variety of platforms.

== Background and release ==
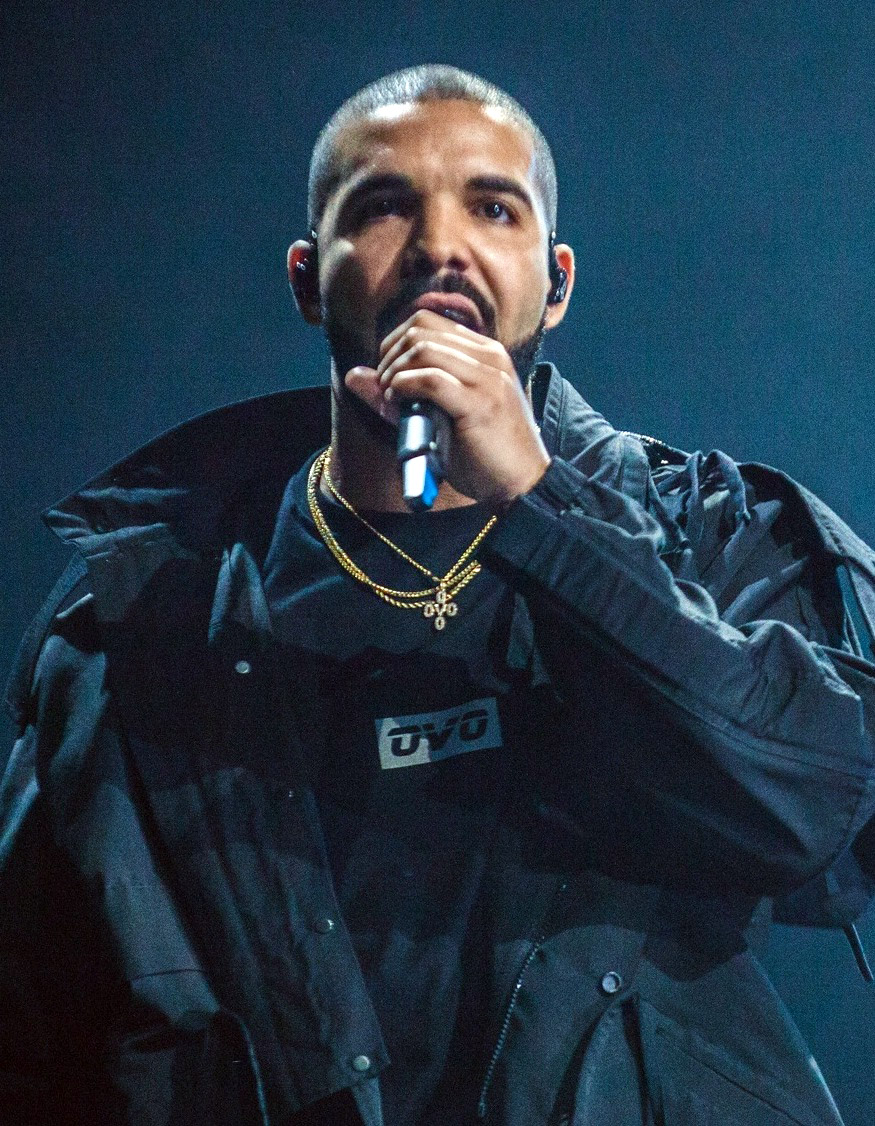
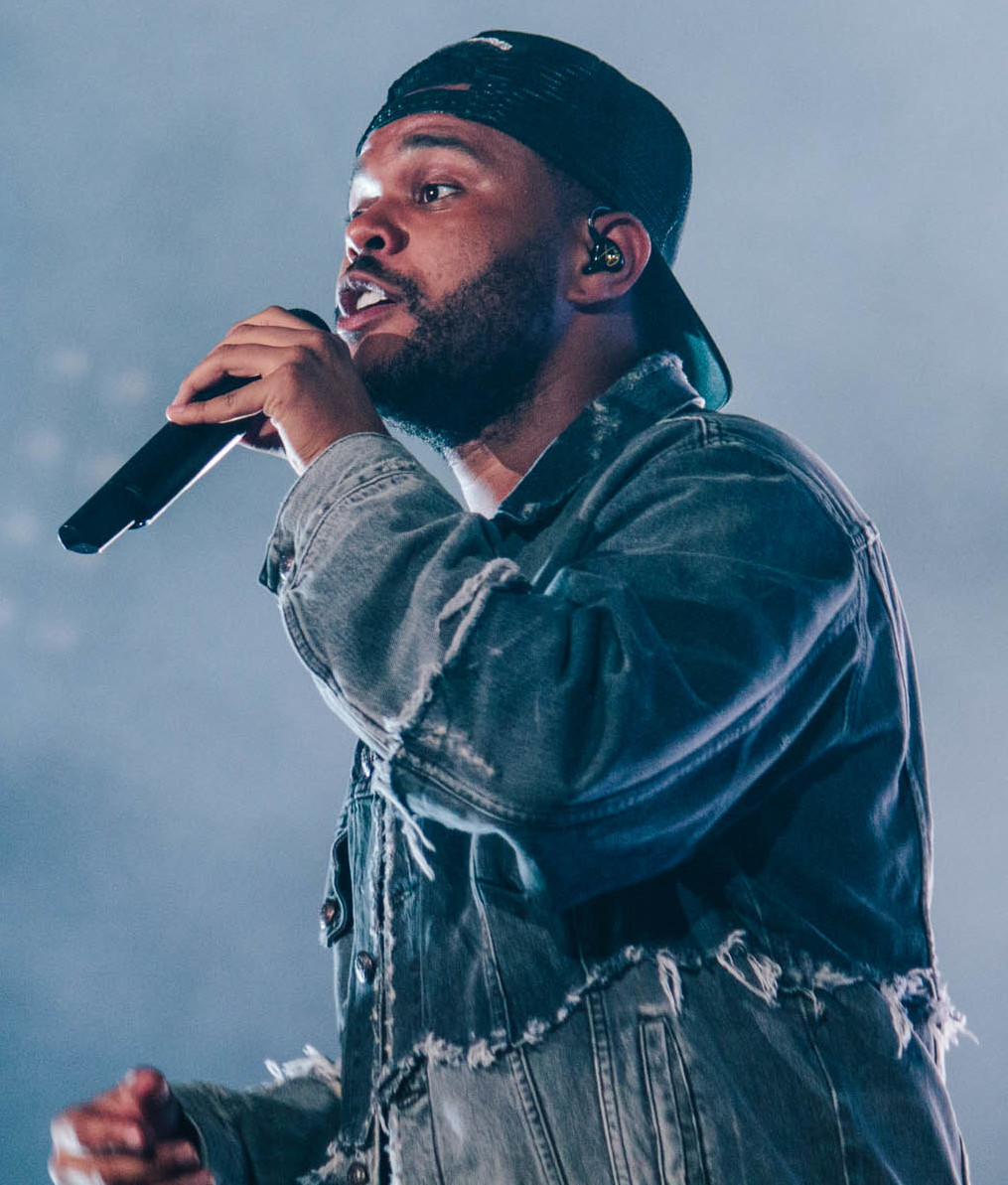
Drake (left) and the Weeknd (right) are featured on "Heart on My Sleeve" despite having no involvement in its production.

In April 2023, Drake responded to an Instagram video of an AI-generated version of him covering "Munch (Feelin' U)" (2022), a song by American rapper Ice Spice, calling it "the final straw". Drake's response came days after his label, Universal Music Group (UMG), requested that Spotify and Apple Music block AI companies from accessing its songs. Voices of other artists have also been used to cover other songs, such as Barbadian singer Rihanna covering Beyoncé's "Cuff It" (2022), American rapper Kanye West covering "Hey There Delilah" (2006) by Plain White T's, British singer Freddie Mercury covering Michael Jackson's "Thriller" (1983), and American singer Ariana Grande covering Drake's "Passionfruit" (2017).

On April 4, TikTok user Ghostwriter977 uploaded "Heart on My Sleeve" to Spotify, Apple Music, SoundCloud, Amazon Music, Deezer, YouTube, and Tidal. A one-minute snippet of the song was then put onto TikTok on April 15. Ghostwriter977 released several videos following the song's wider release onto TikTok, including one showing an apparent screenshot of a text message between Ghostwriter977 and "Rob (Attorney)" with the caption, "Offer in from Republic", referencing Republic Records, Drake and the Weeknd's label. The song was remixed by a YouTube user.

On April 17, UMG filed a takedown notice of the song across multiple platforms. Ghostwriter977 then linked to his page on Laylo—a service allowing creators to notify fans of new releases—asking fans of the song to add their phone number. While some theorized that Laylo may have orchestrated the song's release to draw up attention for their service, the company later clarified that they were not involved with the song. An investigation by The Verge found that UMG may have been able to claim the video through Metro Boomin's producer tag—"If Young Metro don't trust you I'm gon' shoot you"—featured at the beginning of the song; YouTube requires copyright holders to claim that a certain part of a video infringed upon copyright. Since the song's release, UMG has been manually taking down videos using YouTube's report system. Reportedly, the company cannot use YouTube's Content ID system as it does not own the song.

Although the identity of Ghostwriter977 is unknown, the user later stated that he was a ghostwriter who "got paid close to nothing just for major labels to profit". Ghostwriter977's identity has been a topic of speculation. The Verge suggested that Ghostwriter977 may either be UMG and Drake, a legitimate ghostwriter, or Laylo. However, Laylo issued a statement saying it was not behind the account.

== Music and lyrics ==
"Heart on My Sleeve" features AI-generated vocals of Canadian musicians Drake and the Weeknd. The song begins with a tag from American record producer Metro Boomin (although he did not create the song) along with a four-note piano loop which repeats throughout the song. The song's lyrics references artists like Selena Gomez, Justin Bieber, and 21 Savage. Drake and Bieber collaborated on the 2013 song "Right Here" and from January to October 2017, Gomez was in a relationship with The Weeknd, having dated Bieber from 2011 to 2015; Drake has collaborated with 21 Savage on numerous occasions, including the songs "Sneakin'", "Mr. Right Now" (with Metro Boomin), "Knife Talk" (with Project Pat), and the US Billboard Hot 100 number-one "Jimmy Cooks", as well as the collaborative album Her Loss (2022). The Weeknd and 21 Savage have collaborated on one song: Metro Boomin's "Creepin'".

== Reception ==
Prior to its removal, "Heart on My Sleeve" racked up 600,000 streams on Spotify, 275,000 views on YouTube, and 15 million views on TikTok. One unofficial Twitter reupload of the song garnered 6.9 million views. More than a thousand videos on TikTok have used the song, according to Vice. The BBC estimated that the song earned at least US$1,888 from Spotify alone; Billboard estimated that the song may have earned US$9,400 globally across all platforms. The song's removal may result in the royalties being withheld.

The song has posed questions on the ethics and legality of creating songs with AI. Stanford University associate professor Ge Wang, talking about AI-created songs, said that the "cat is not going back in the bag". Lauren Chanel, a writer on technology and culture, wrote in an article by The New York Times that AI-generated vocals may allow "people who are not Black to put on the costume of a Black person". Meanwhile, American rapper Meek Mill called the song "flame".

== Legacy ==
"Heart on My Sleeve" has caused an influx of songs using Drake's voice; one such song, "Laser Bong", was reportedly made in several minutes using the digital audio workstation software Ableton Live by Switched on Pop (2019) co-author Charlie Harding, using an article from The Verge about a laser bong. On September 5, Ghostwriter977 released "Whiplash", a song featuring the AI-generated vocals of American rappers Travis Scott and 21 Savage. According to The New York Times, Ghostwriter977 seeks a Grammy Award for "Heart on My Sleeve"; The Recording Academy CEO Harvey Mason Jr. reached out to Ghostwriter977 after the release of "Heart on My Sleeve".
