= Leaf Yeh =

Taiwanese singer-songwriter

Leaf Yeh 葉穎
- Born: Taiwan
- Origin: Taiwan
- Genres: Indiepop
- Occupation: Singer
- Instruments: Vocals; Flute; Piano

Leaf Yeh (Chinese: 葉穎) is a Taiwanese indie singer-songwriter. Leaf Yeh was awarded the 2nd place in the NCCU Golden Melody (Mandarin: 政大金旋獎), and released her first album "Departure" (Mandarin: 出發) in 2013. She was also a member of the underground band Roli., and shortly thereafter, under the name Leaf, she became the lead singer of Night Keepers (Mandarin: 守夜人), releasing "Nightland" (Mandarin: 永夜島) during her time in the group. She left the group in early 2017 and has since uploaded songs as a solo artist on the website StreetVoice.

After the initial pop song "Departure", she gradually changed her music style from pop to indie music, and in 2018, she released her solo EP "Photosynthesis" (Mandarin: 光合) with "Leaf", and in the album "Birth&Death" (Mandarin: 生滅), she added elements of world music, which is rarely found in Taiwanese music, and mixed in many styles and instruments, such as: didgeridoo, sitar, handpan, etc. In 2022, her album Live Like Me won the "Best Composer" award at the 13th Golden Indie Music Awards

== Discography ==
=== EP ===
| Title | Release date | Track |
|---|---|---|
| 光合 Photosynthesis | 2018 | 1. 海面之上 Above the water 2. 原味 Original; 3. 失去論 Newborn; 4. 等她 Marie |

=== Studio albums ===
| Title | Release date | Track |
|---|---|---|
| 出發 Departure | April 3, 2013 | 1. 愛情門徒; 2. 愛自有解答; 3. 月光砂; 4. 再見要再見; 5. 給自己的信; 6. 每一次; 7. 會心一笑; 8. 愛情觀; 9. 欠著; 10. Sweet Lullaby |
| 生滅 Birth&Death | September 27, 2019 | 1. 春天的你; 2. 冬天的他; 3. 生滅 Birth&Death; 4. 取巧; 5. 捕夢網; 6. 星星; 7. 花瓣; 8. 席地而坐; 9. Harmonic; 10. 小王子; 11. 合・流; Note: "The Little Prince" and "Hopscotch" are included in the digital edition of "Funeral on the Rose Planet". |
| 活得像自己的名字 Live Like Me | May 25, 2022 | 1. 謝謝你總是讓我傷心; 2. 就是愛著如此奇怪的你; 3. 吹眠; 4. 自己的房間; 5. 愛咿; 6. 給一點溫暖; 7. 原來是寂寞; 8. Spark！; 9. 你哭完該笑了; 10. 只是需要你的陪伴 |

=== Singing on campus ===
- April 16, 2020 Chung Yuan Christian University Odeon Music Center

== Performances ==
=== Full-length movies ===
- 2023 "Dimming" as Pluto

== Award record ==
| Year | Ceremony | Award | Work | Result |
|---|---|---|---|---|
| 2019 | The 10th Golden Indie Music Awards | Best Crossover or World Music Single | Clever | Nominated |
