= MoonDial =

2024 jazz album by Pat Metheny

Studio album by Pat Metheny
- Released: July 26, 2024
- Studio: High Rocks
- Length: 61:25
- Labels: BMG; Modern
- Producer: Pat Metheny

Pat Metheny chronology
Dream Box (2023)	MoonDial (2024)

MoonDial is a 2024 studio album released by jazz musician Pat Metheny. It features solo performances by Metheny on a custom built baritone guitar and contains a mix of both originals and covers. The album received generally positive reviews from critics.

== Background ==
Metheny recorded Moondial while on break from his Dream Box tour. On the album, he played on a custom built baritone guitar made by the luthier Linda Manzer. He also tuned the guitar to a custom tuning system, which required custom Nylon strings as most could not handle the system. Metheny struggled to find strings that worked, until he saw some that were made by an Argentinian-based company being used by another player in a video. He bought the strings on Amazon, which arrived the day before his Dream Box tour started. Metheny stated that he felt like the guitar's tuning made it feel like the guitar was "three two-string instruments that just happen to be sitting right next to each other". The middle two strings were tuned up an octave from standard tuning, while the other four were a fourth or fifth below it.

Metheny recorded Moondial over the course of a week in the Hudson Valley. He used an AEA R88 ribbon mic with a Go Acoustic internal pickup. It is the third album of Metheny playing solo acoustic guitar. No overdubs were done on the album. The album features 12 compositions, comprising a mix of both originals and covers. Metheny had written most of the original tracks during the Dream Box tour, except for "This Belongs to You", a composition he originally recorded in 2012.

== Reception ==
Professional ratings
Aggregate scores
Source	Rating
Metacritic	80/100
Review scores
Source	Rating
All About Jazz	3.5/5 stars
AllMusic	4/5 stars
Jazzwise	4/5 stars
Mojo	4/5 stars
Uncut	3.5/5 stars
Tom Hull	B+

According to the review aggregator Metacritic, MoonDial received "generally favorable reviews" based on a weighted average score of 80 out of 100 from four critic scores. Thom Jurek wrote in AllMusic, "If you appreciate Metheny's acoustic guitar recordings, MoonDial will undoubtedly delight, and its elegance folds seamlessly into its predecessors". Doug Collette in Glide Magazine wrote that "There's an emotional investment in play on Moondial by which Pat derives a tangible pleasure that correlates directly to his sense of accomplishment". Stuart Nicholson of Jazzwise particularly praised Metheny's renditions of "Here, There, And Everywhere", "Angel Eyes", and "My Love and I" for hitting "the right mood here with performances of subtlety, nuance, warmth and humanity".

== Track listing ==
All tracks are written by Pat Metheny, except where noted.

MoonDial track listing
No.	Title	Lyrics	Music	Length
1.	"MoonDial"			6:24
2.	"La Crosse"			4:48
3.	"You're Everything"	Neville Potter	Chick Corea	2:38
4.	"Here, There and Everywhere"	John Lennon / Paul McCartney	John Lennon / Paul McCartney	4:24
5.	"We Can't See It, But It's There"			2:59
6.	"Falcon Love"			7:14
7.	"Everything Happens to Me / Somewhere"	Tom Adair / Stephen Sondheim	Matt Dennis / Leonard Bernstein	7:12
8.	"Londonderry Air"		Traditional	5:03
9.	"This Belongs to You"			5:28
10.	"Shōga"			3:15
11.	"My Love and I"	Johnny Mercer	David Raskin	3:51
12.	"Angel Eyes"	Earl K. Brent	Matt Dennis	6:56
13.	"MoonDial (epilogue)"			1:13
Total length:				61:25

== Personnel ==
- Pat Metheny – baritone guitar
