= The Light Inside =

Studio album by J. Ivy
- Released: 2023
- Genre: Spoken word
- Length: 33:03

The Light Inside is the seventh album by American spoken word artist J. Ivy. It earned him a Grammy Award for Best Spoken Word Poetry Album in 2024.
