= I Only See the Moon =

Studio album by The Milk Carton Kids
- Released: 2023
- Label: Far Cry

Professional ratings
Review scores
Source	Rating
AllMusic	4/5 stars
The Times	5/5 stars
PopMatters	9/10 stars

I Only See the Moon is an album by The Milk Carton Kids. It was nominated for the Grammy Award for Best Folk Album in 2024, and was named one of the 15 best folk albums of 2023 by PopMatters.

== Track listing ==
I Only See the Moon track listing
No.	Title	Length
1.	"All of the Time in the World to Kill"	2:52
2.	"Star Shine"	3:14
3.	"When You're Gone"	2:45
4.	"Wheels & Levers"	4:38
5.	"I Only See the Moon"	2:37
6.	"Running on Sweet Smile"	3:21
7.	"One True Love"	4:33
8.	"Body & Soul"	3:29
9.	"North Country Ride"	6:08
10.	"Will You Remember Me?"	3:51
Total length:		37:48
