= William L. Dawson (composer) =

American composer (1899–1990)

William Levi Dawson
- Portrait of Dawson (circa 1931)
- Born: September 26, 1899; Anniston, Alabama
- Died: May 2, 1990 (aged 90); Montgomery, Alabama
- Education: Tuskegee Institute; Horner Institute of Fine Arts; American Conservatory of Music
- Occupations: Composer; Conductor; Musicologist
- Works: Negro Folk Symphony
- Parents: George W. Dawson (father); Eliza Starkey Dawson (mother)

William Levi Dawson (September 26, 1899 – May 2, 1990) was an American composer, choir director, professor, and musicologist.

== Early life and education ==
William Levi Dawson was born in Anniston, Alabama in 1899, the first of seven children born to Eliza Starkey Dawson and George W. Dawson. In 1912, he ran away from home to study music full-time as a pre-college student at the historically Black institution Tuskegee Institute (now University) under the tutelage of school president Booker T. Washington. Dawson paid his tuition by working as a music librarian and a manual laborer in the school’s Agricultural Division. He also participated as a member of Tuskegee’s choir, band and orchestra, playing several instruments, composing scores, and traveling with the Tuskegee Singers for five years. Dawson graduated from Tuskegee in 1921.

In 1925, he received a Bachelor of Music in theory at the Horner Institute of Fine Arts in Kansas City, Missouri. He continued his education at the American Conservatory of Music in Chicago, and graduated in 1927 with a master’s degree in composition.

In addition, Dawson studied composition and orchestration with Henry V. Stearns at Washburn College, counterpoint with Sir Carl Busch in Kansas City, and conducting with Felix Borowski at Chicago Musical College.

== Career ==
Dawson began his teaching career in the Kansas City public school system. He served as first trombonist with the Civic Orchestra of Chicago from 1927 to 1930, and with Redpath Chautauqua.

In 1931, Dawson organized and headed the School of Music at Tuskegee (Institute) University. He would remain on faculty for twenty five years, and during his tenure he appointed a large number of faculty members who later became well known for their work in the field. Additionally, Dawson also developed the Tuskegee Institute Choir into an internationally renowned ensemble; the choir performed for President Herbert Hoover in the White House, for President Franklin D. Roosevelt at Hyde Park, and the opening of Radio City Music Hall in New York City.

Dawson began composing at a young age, and early in his compositional career, his Trio for Violin, Cello, and Piano was performed by the Kansas City Symphony.

=== Negro Folk Symphony ===
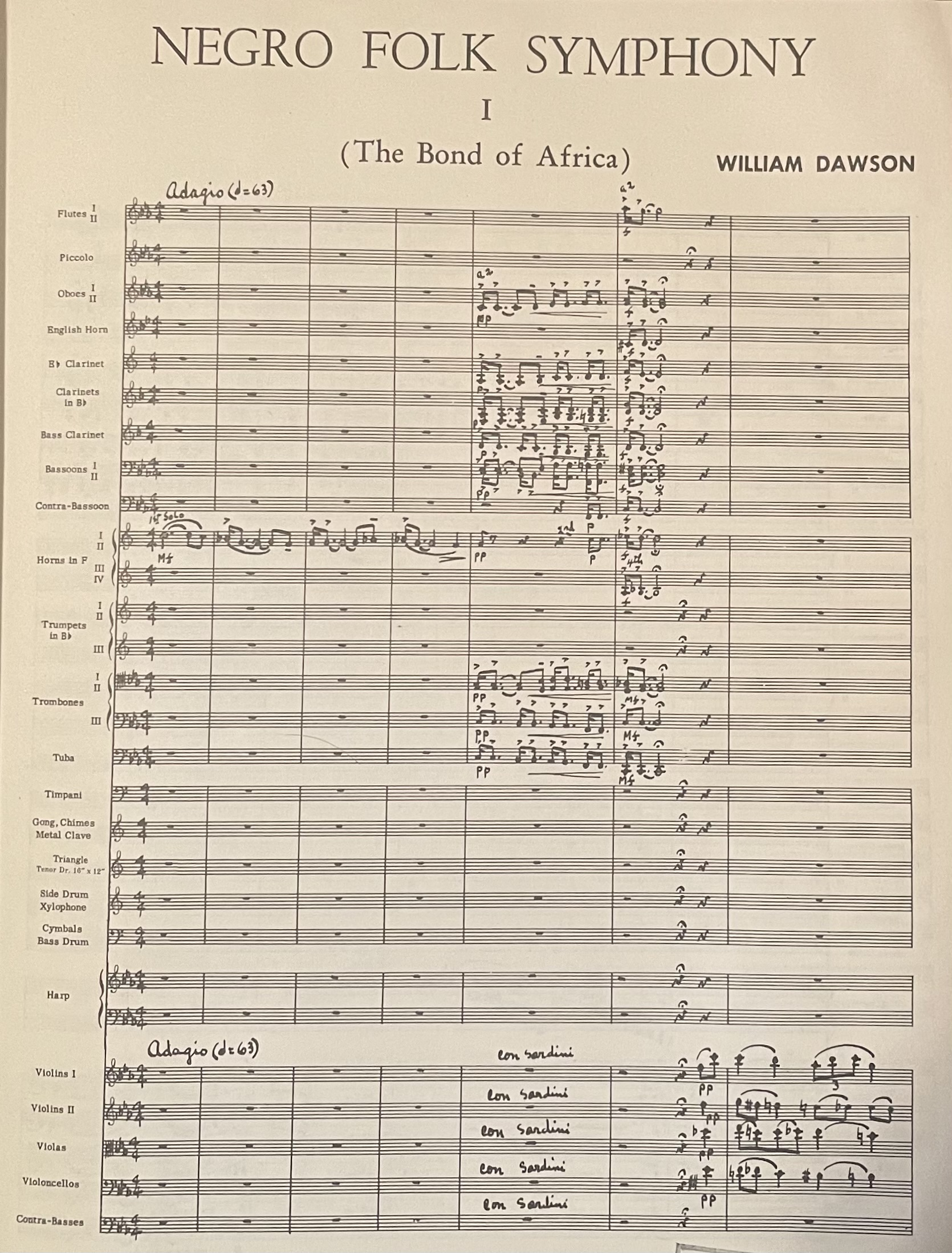
Negro Folk Symphony. Sheet music. Courtesy of Shawnee Press, Inc., 2023.

In November of 1934, Dawson's Negro Folk Symphony was premiered at Carnegie Hall by the Philadelphia Orchestra under the leadership of Leopold Stokowski. Dawson's goal was to write a symphony in the Negro Folk Idiom, and in the symphonic form used by European composers of the Romantic-Nationalist School (Dawson). He was greatly inspired by Dvorak and his views on nationalism in music. The entire work mirrors the Negro Spiritual. The symphony was a huge success and it garnered a great deal of attention from many critics. The success was however short lived. After four back-to-back performances in November, Dawson receded from the headlines, and the symphony was put to rest for 18 years.

The symphony was revised in 1952 with added African rhythms inspired by the composer's trip to West Africa. This new version was recorded by Stokowski and the American Symphony Orchestra in 1963. Dawson said that the composition was an attempt to convey the missing elements that had been lost when Africans came into bondage outside their homeland. The piece would go on to be his only symphony. Following its premiere, it was performed a few times in the span of 18 months before it was forgotten for decades.

In June 2020, the piece was recorded by the ORF Vienna Radio Symphony Orchestra. It was revived and performed by both the Seattle Symphony (conducted by Roderick Cox, a champion of the work) and Oregon Symphony in 2022, then again in early 2023 by the Los Angeles Philharmonic (with Cox conducting) and the Oakland Symphony. A live recording of the Seattle Symphony's performance was released in 2023 alongside works by George Walker. Then, on February 2, 2023, the symphony was performed by the Philadelphia Orchestra making it 5th live performance since its premiere, under director Yannick Nezet Seguin. On February 24, 2024, it was again performed by the Las Vegas Philharmonic, under music director Donato Cabrera at The Smith Center for the Performing Arts.

==== I. The Bond of Africa ====
In the symphony's first movement, Dawson uses original melodies in the style of spirituals for the first theme, and for the second theme, he quotes melodies from actual spirituals. According to the composer "a link was taken out of a human chain when the first African was taken from the shores of his native land and sent into slavery. This missing link is represented by a French Horn motif that opens the first movement. This motif can be heard in all three movements of the symphony.

==== II. Hope in the Night ====
This second movement is the heart of the symphony. It is a heavy movement that gives listeners the space to feel all of the turmoil and pain that African slaves had to endure. It opens with 3 soft strokes of a gong, followed by a melody played by the English Horn. According to the composer, this is meant to represent an "atmosphere of the humdrum life of a people whose bodies were baked by the sun and lashed with the whip for two hundred and fifty years; whose lives were prescribed before they were born". He uses original melodies for all of the themes of the second movement. After a big swell to its full climax, the music fades into the distance and the drumbeat continues. The slow fade out meant to represent a struggle that never came to a resolution.

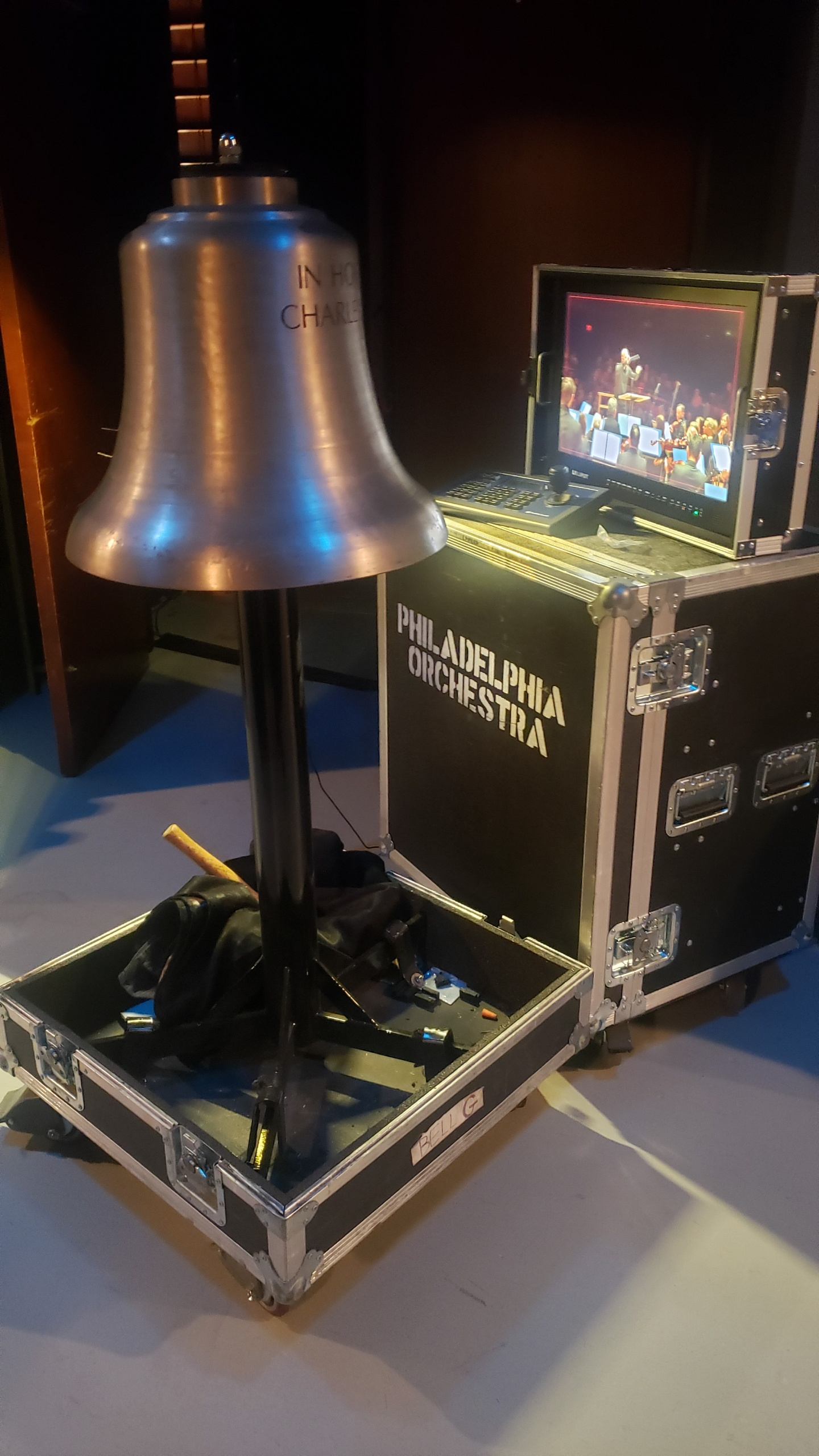
The bell that was used by the Philadelphia Orchestra during the third movement of the Negro Folk Symphony

==== III. O Let Me Shine! ====
For all themes within this movement, Dawson quotes actual spirituals. This movement moves quickly from one idea to the next. In the 2023 performance by the Philadelphia Orchestra, a bell was struck repeatedly towards the end to represent church bells tolling, a prominent motif within African American history. The symphony ends on an ominous note, providing the listener with a sense of incompletion, again meant to represent an unresolved struggle.

=== Choral arrangements ===
Besides chamber music, he is also known for his contributions to both orchestral and choral literature. His best-known works are arrangements of and variations on spirituals. His most popular spirituals include "Ezekiel Saw the Wheel," "Jesus Walked the Lonesome Valley," "Talk about a Child That Do Love Jesus," and "King Jesus Is a-Listening."

Dawson's arrangements of traditional African-American spirituals are widely published in the United States and are regularly performed by school, college and community choral programs. According to Dominique-René de Lerma of Lawrence University, in notes to "The Spirituals of William L. Dawson" produced by The St Olaf Choir in 1997, "What is even more striking than the richness of Dawson's textures is the lushness of his sonorities, exhibiting his remarkable insight into vocal potentials."

== Personal ==
Dawson married pianist Cornelia Lampton in 1927; she died in 1928.

On September 21, 1935, Dawson married Cecile DeMae Nicholson of Watonga, Oklahoma. Mrs. Dawson owned and operated Le Petite Bazaar, a women's clothing shop.

William L. Dawson died on May 2, 1990, at the age of 90 in Montgomery, Alabama. He is buried in the Tuskegee University cemetery.

== Notable works ==
- Out in the Fields (1928)
- Negro Folk Symphony (1934)
  1. The Bond of Africa
  2. Hope in the Night
  3. O Let Me Shine!
- Soon Ah Will Be Done (1934)
- Jesus Walked the Lonesome Valley
- King Jesus Is a-Listening
- Talk about a Child That Do Love Jesus
- There is a Balm in Gilead (1939)
- Steal Away (1942)
- Every Time I Feel the Spirit (1946)
- Swing Low (1946)
- Mary Had a Baby (1947) Christmas spiritual, dedicated to Robert Shaw
- Ain'a That Good News (1967)
- Ezekiel Saw The Wheel
- My Lord, What A Morning

== Honors ==
- Honorary Doctor of Music, Tuskegee Institute, 1956.
- University of Pennsylvania Glee Club Award of Merit, in honor of his contribution to music for male choruses, 1968.
- Alabama Arts Hall of Fame, 1975.
- Phi Mu Alpha Sinfonia, Alpha Alpha chapter, elected to the music fraternity, 1977.
- Honorary doctorate, Lincoln University, 1978.
- Alabama Arts Award, 1980.
- Honorary doctorate, Ithaca College, 1982.
- Alumni Merit Award, Tuskegee Institute, 1983.
- Alabama Music Hall of Fame, 1989 Inductee.
- Tuskegee University Board of Trustees Distinguished Service Award, 1989.
- Alabama Music Educators Association Hall of Fame, Inaugural class of 2008.
- American Choral Directors Association Wall of Honor.
