= Dig My Grave =

Bahamian Spiritual

Dig My Grave is a Bahamian rhyming spiritual used for burials. Henry Edward Krehbiel wrote:

Relics of ancient ceremonies connected with death and burial have survived amongst the American negroes and have been influential in producing some strangely beautiful and impressive songs. One of these, 'Dig My Grave', from the Bahamas, where the songs, though they have much community of both poetical and musical phrase with them, yet show a higher development than do the slave songs of the States, is peculiarly impressive.

== Lyrics ==
Dig my grave long an' narrow,
Make my coffin long and strong,
Dig my grave long an' narrow,
Make my coffin long and strong.

Bright angels to my feet,
Bright angels to my head,
Bright angels to carry me when I die.

Oh! Mi little soul's goin' shine, shine,
Oh! Mi little soul goin' shine like a stahr,
Oh! Mi little soul goin' shine like a stahr,
Good Lawd, I'm bound for 'even at rest.
