= Live at the Piano =

Live album by Cory Henry
- Released: 2023
- Recorded: February 27, 2023
- Studio: Apogee Studios in Los Angeles
- Genre: Jazz

Live at the Piano is an album by Cory Henry. It earned a Grammy Award nomination for Best Alternative Jazz Album.
