= Phoenix (Lakecia Benjamin album) =

Studio album by Lakecia Benjamin
- Released: 2023
- Genre: Jazz
- Label: Whirlwind

Phoenix is an album by Lakecia Benjamin. It earned a Grammy Award nomination for Best Jazz Instrumental Album.
