= Dream Box =

Studio album by Pat Metheny
- Released: June 16, 2023
- Recorded: 2021–2022
- Studio: High Rocks
- Genre: Jazz
- Length: 56:01
- Label: Modern
- Producer: Pat Metheny

Pat Metheny chronology
| Side-Eye NYC (V1.IV) (2021) | Dream Box (2023) | MoonDial (2024) |

Dream Box is a solo studio album by American guitarist Pat Metheny. It was released on June 16, 2023, through Modern Recordings. It received generally favorable reviews from critics. It was nominated for Best Jazz Instrumental Album at the 66th Annual Grammy Awards.

== Background ==
Dream Box consists of solo guitar works by Pat Metheny. It includes six original compositions and his cover versions of "Never Was Love", "I Fall in Love Too Easily", and "Morning of the Carnival".

== Critical reception ==
Professional ratings
Aggregate scores
| Source | Rating |
|---|---|
| Metacritic | 76/100 |
Review scores
| Source | Rating |
| All About Jazz | 4/5 stars |
| AllMusic | 4/5 stars |
| Jazzwise | 4/5 stars |
| laut.de | 3/5 stars |
| Pitchfork | 7.6/10 |
| Spectrum Culture | 70% |
| Tom Hull | B+ |

According to the review aggregator Metacritic, Dream Box received "generally favorable reviews" based on a weighted average score of 76 out of 100 from 5 critic scores.

Sam Sodomsky of Pitchfork stated, "Favoring minor keys and loose sketches of melody, Metheny embraces the scattered, jetlagged genesis." He added, "This is music made for late nights and bleary eyes, wistful and half-awake." Thom Jurek of AllMusic commented that "The electric guitar ballads on Dream Box offer unvarnished introspection, uncanny musical vision, and gorgeous technique."

== Accolades ==
It was nominated for Best Jazz Instrumental Album at the 66th Annual Grammy Awards.

== Track listing ==
All tracks are written by Pat Metheny, except where noted.

Dream Box track listing
| No. | Title | Writer(s) | Length |
|---|---|---|---|
| 1. | "The Waves Are Not the Ocean" | | 5:39 |
| 2. | "From the Mountains" | | 8:20 |
| 3. | "Ole & Gard" | | 6:33 |
| 4. | "Trust Your Angels" | | 5:28 |
| 5. | "Never Was Love" | Russ Long | 5:57 |
| 6. | "I Fall in Love Too Easily" | Jule Styne; Sammy Cahn | 5:08 |
| 7. | "P.C. of Belgium" | | 5:00 |
| 8. | "Morning of the Carnival" | Luiz Bonfá; Antônio Maria | 6:42 |
| 9. | "Clouds Can't Change the Sky" | | 7:14 |
| Total length: | | | 56:01 |

== Personnel ==
Credits adapted from liner notes.

- Pat Metheny – electric guitar, baritone guitar

=== Production ===
- Pat Metheny – producer, arranger
- Pete Karam – recording, mixing, mastering
- Steve Rodby – mixing/mastering consultancy
- Doyle Partners – design

== Charts ==
Chart performance for Dream Box
| Chart (2023) | Peak position |
|---|---|
| Belgian Albums (Ultratop Wallonia) | 158 |
| French Albums (SNEP) | 109 |
| German Albums (Offizielle Top 100) | 21 |
| Italian Albums (FIMI) | 78 |
| Swiss Albums (Schweizer Hitparade) | 30 |
| Scottish Albums (OCC) | 47 |
| UK Album Downloads (OCC) | 90 |
| UK Independent Albums (OCC) | 19 |
| UK Jazz & Blues Albums (OCC) | 4 |
| US Top Contemporary Jazz Albums (Billboard) | 1 |
| US Top Jazz Albums (Billboard) | 2 |
