= Lalah Hathaway discography =

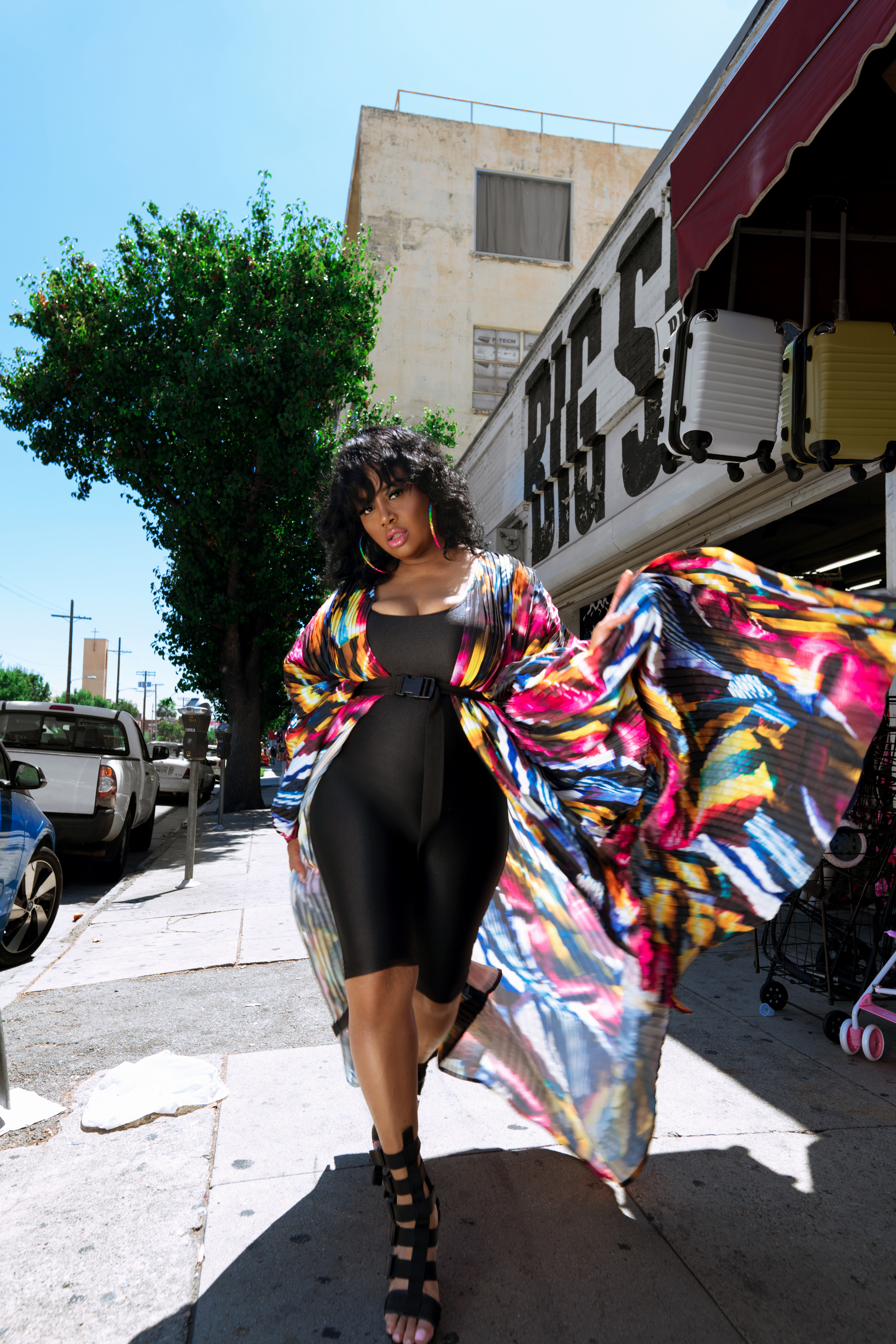
- Hathaway in 2008.
- Studio albums: 6
- Live albums: 1
- Compilation albums: 1
- Collaborative albums: 1

This is the discography for American singer Lalah Hathaway.

== Albums ==
=== Studio albums ===
List of studio albums, with selected chart positions
Title	Details	Peak chart positions			
Title	Details	US	US R&B	US Jazz	US Indie
Lalah Hathaway	Released: October 20, 1990; Label: Virgin; Formats: CD, LP, cassette	191	18	—	—
A Moment	Released: May 31, 1994; Label: Virgin; Formats: CD, LP, cassette	—	40	—	—
Outrun the Sky	Released: September 24, 2004; Label: Mesa/Bluemoon; Formats: CD, digital download	—	34	—	—
Self Portrait	Released: June 3, 2008; Label: Stax; Formats: CD, digital download	63	6	—	—
Where It All Begins	Released: October 18, 2011; Label: Stax; Formats: CD, digital download	32	7	—	—
Honestly	Released: October 20, 2017; Label: Hathaway, eOne Music; Formats: CD, digital download	—	—	—	9
VANTABLACK	Released: June 14, 2024; Label: Hathaway, SoNo Recording Group; Formats: CD, digital download	—	—	—	—

=== Collaborative albums ===
List of collaborative albums, with selected chart positions
Title	Details	Peak chart positions			
Title	Details	US	US R&B	US Jazz	US Indie
The Song Lives On (with Joe Sample)	Released: April 20, 1999; Label: PRA, GRP; Formats: CD, LP	196	53	2	—

=== Live albums ===
List of live albums, with selected chart positions
Title	Details	Peak chart positions			
Title	Details	US	US R&B	US Jazz	US Indie
Lalah Hathaway Live	Released: October 30, 2015; Label: Hathaway, eOne Music; Formats: CD, digital download	33	2	—	3

=== Remix albums ===
List of remix albums, with selected chart positions
Title	Details
VANTABLACK: EXPANSION PACK	Released: July 18, 2025; Label: Hathaway, SoNo Recording Group; Formats: digital download

=== Compilations albums ===
List of compilation albums, with selected chart positions
Title	Details
It's Somethin' – The Virgin Years	Released: September 13, 2019; Label: 90/90, Cherry Red; Formats: CD, digital download

== Singles ==
=== As lead artist ===
List of singles as lead artist, with selected chart positions, showing year released and album name
Title	Year	Peak chart positions					Album
Title	Year	US	US R&B	US Adult R&B	US Dance	UK	Album
"Inside the Beat"	1987	—	—	—	—	—	Non-album single
"Heaven Knows"	1990	89	3	—	35	66	Lalah Hathaway
"Baby Don't Cry"	1990	—	18	—	—	54	Lalah Hathaway
"It's Somethin'"	1991	—	21	—	—	—	Lalah Hathaway
"I'm Coming Back"	1991	—	54	—	—	—	Lalah Hathaway
"Night & Day"	1991	—	—	—	—	—	Night & Day EP
"Let Me Love You"	1994	—	37	13	—	—	A Moment
"Separate Ways"	1994	—	—	—	—	—	A Moment
"These Are the Things"	1994	—	—	—	—	—	A Moment
"Anyone Can Be A Hero"	1994	—	—	—	—	—	Blankman OST
"When Your Life Was Low"	1999	—	—	20	—	—	The Song Lives On
"Fever"	1999	—	—	—	—	—	The Song Lives On
"Forever, for Always, for Love"	2004	112	37	1	—	—	Outrun the Sky
"Better and Better"	2004	—	—	21	—	—	Outrun the Sky
"Let Go"	2008	—	51	16	24	—	Self Portrait
"That Was Then"	2008	—	—	32	—	—	Self Portrait
"If You Want To"	2011	—	72	24	—	—	Where It All Begins
"You Were Meant for Me"	2011	—	84	29	—	—	Where It All Begins
"Shine" (featuring DivaGeek)	2013	—	—	—	—	—	Non-album single
"Little Ghetto Boy" (solo or featuring Snoop Dogg)	2015	—	—	—	—	—	Live
"Angel"	2015	—	—	1	—	—	Live
"I Can't Wait"	2017	—	—	20	—	—	Honestly
"Call on Me (Remix)" (featuring Redman)	2018	—	—	—	—	—	Honestly
"Show Me Your Soul" (with Robert Glasper)	2021	—	—	26	—	—	Non-album single
"Canvas" (with Ariza)	2022	—	—	—	—	—	Non-album single
"Now" (with Juan Winans)	2022	—	—	—	—	—	Non-album single
"This Christmas" (with Donny Hathaway)	2022	—	—	—	—	—	Non-album single
"The Energy"	2023	—	—	—	—	—	Vantablack
"So In Love"	2024	—	—	11	—	—	Vantablack

=== As featured artist ===
List of singles as featured artist, with selected chart positions, showing year released and album name
Title	Year	Peak chart positions					Album
Title	Year	US Gosp.	US R&B	US Adult R&B	US Jazz	UK	Album
"Family Affair" (B.E.F. featuring Lalah Hathaway)	1991	—	—	—	—	37	Music of Quality and Distinction Volume Two
"Love Like This" (Grover Washington featuring Lalah Hathaway)	1992	—	31	—	—	—	Next Exit
"One More Chance" (Art Porter featuring Lalah Hathaway)	1996	—	—	36	—	—	Lay Your Hands on Me
"Waiting in Vain" (Kirk Whalum featuring Lalah Hathaway)	2010	21	—	—	—	—	Everything is Everything: The Music of Donny Hathaway
"Every Promise" (Earnest Pugh featuring Lalah Hathaway)	2012	23	—	—	—	—	Best of – The E Factor
"Waiting in Vain" (Dianne Reeves featuring Lalah Hathaway)	2014	—	—	—	25	—	Beautiful Life
"Insanity" (Gregory Porter featuring Lalah Hathaway)	2016	—	—	15	—	—	Take Me to the Alley
"Coastin'" (Boney James featuring Lalah Hathaway)	2021	—	—	17	—	—	Detour

== Album appearances ==
Year	Song	Album
1992	"Love Like This" Grover Washington Jr. feat. Lalah Hathaway	Next Exit
1993	"It's Not Heaven If You're Not There" The Winans feat. Lalah Hathaway	All Out
1993	"Round Midnight" Marcus Miller feat. Lalah Hathaway	The Sun Don't Lie
1994	"I Surrender" Gerald Albright feat. Lalah Hathaway	Smooth
1995	"Flying Easy" Pete Escovedo feat. Lalah Hathaway	Flying South
1996	"One More Chance" Art Porter feat. Lalah Hathaway	Lay Your Hands on Me
1996	"Summer Breeze" Wayman Tisdale feat. Lalah Hathaway	In The Zone
1998	"My Only" Wayman Tisdale feat. Lalah Hathaway	Decisions
1998	"I Just Wanna Stop" Chris Minh Doky feat. Lalah Hathaway	Minh
1998	"24/7" Bread and Butter feat. Lalah Hathaway & Roy Hargrove	The Adventures of Bread and Butter, Vol. 1
1998	"Summertime" Marcus Miller feat. Lalah Hathaway	Live & More
1999	"All I Ask of You" Ricky Peterson feat. Lalah Hathaway	Souvenir
1999	"When I'm with You" David Sanborn feat. Lalah Hathaway & Eric Benet	Inside
1999	"I Want You" John Tropea feat. Lalah Hathaway	A Simple Way to Say.. I Love You
2000	"A Simple Song" Alex Bugnon feat. Lalah Hathaway	As Promised
2001	"Ghetto Heaven" Hiram Bullock feat. Lalah Hathaway	Color Me
2002	"Earth" Me'shell NdegeOcello feat. Lalah Hathaway	Cookie: The Anthropological
2002	"Someday We'll All Be Free" Take 6 feat. Lalah Hathaway	Beautiful World
2003	"You've Got a Friend" Ken Hirai feat. Lalah Hathaway	Ken's Bar
2003	"I Loves You Porgy," "Burning Down the House," "When Your Life Was Low," "People Make the World Go Round," "Killing Me Softly" (Marcus Miller feat. Lalah Hathaway)	The Ozell Tapes: The Official Bootleg
2004	"Don't Forget to Remember" Donald Lawrence feat. Lalah Hathaway & Ramsey Lewis	I Speak Life
2005	"La Villette" Marcus Miller feat. Lalah Hathaway	Silver Rain
2005	"Heaven" Me'Shell NdegeOcello feat. Lalah Hathaway	The Spirit Music Jamia: Dance of the Infidel
2006	"Silent Nocturne"/"Have Yourself a Merry Little Christmas"(Israel & New Breed feat. Lalah Hathaway	A Timeless Christmas
2006	"Brazilian Rhyme" Marcus Miller feat. Lalah Hathaway	Another Side Of Me: Selections Of Marcus Miller
2007	"Heaven" Mike City feat. Lalah Hathaway	We Are Family 2007: Artists & Friends for Hurricane Relief
2007	"Love's Holiday" feat. Lalah Hathaway	Interpretations: Celebrating the Music of Earth, Wind & Fire
2007	"Thought You Should Know" Carl Thomas feat. Lalah Hathaway	So Much Better
2008	"Ooh" Marcus Miller feat. Lalah Hathaway	Marcus
2008	"Lost Without You (Spoken Words)" Marcus Miller feat. Taraji P. Henson and Lalah Hathaway	Marcus
2009	"Dealing" Eric Roberson feat. Lalah Hathaway	Music Fan First
2009	"A Telephone Call Away" George Benson feat. Lalah Hathaway	Songs and Stories
2010	"He's Been Just That Good" Kirk Whalum feat. Lalah Hathaway	The Gospel According to Jazz Chapter 3
2010	"It's What I Do" Kirk Whalum feat. Lalah Hathaway	The Gospel According to Jazz Chapter 3
2010	"The Thrill is Gone" Kirk Whalum feat. Lalah Hathaway	The Gospel According to Jazz Chapter 3
2010	"It's A Man's, Man's, Man's World" Mindi Abair feat. Lalah Hathaway	In Hi-Fi Stereo
2010	"You Had to Know" Kirk Whalum feat. Lalah Hathaway	Everything Is Everything: The Music of Donny Hathaway
2010	"Come Over" Natalie Stewart feat. Lalah Hathaway	Floetic Soul
2012	"Endangered Species" Esperanza Spalding feat. Lalah Hathaway	Radio Music Society
2012	"My Worship" John P. Kee feat. Frank McComb, PJ Morton, Lalah Hathaway, Patrick Dopson, Maranda Curtis Willis, Lil' Mo, Le'Andria Johnson, Dathan Thigpen, Zacardi Cortez, Kim Burrell, Lowell Pye, Glenn Jones & Shelia Lakin	Life and Favor
2012	"Cherish the Day" Robert Glasper feat. Lalah Hathaway	Black Radio
2012	"Every Promise" Earnest Pugh feat. Lalah Hathaway	The Very Best of Earnest Pugh: The E Factor
2012	"Pick Up" L.A. Players feat. Lalah Hathaway	Sweet & Sexy Soul
2013	"Something" Snarky Puppy feat. Lalah Hathaway	Family Dinner - Volume One
2013	"Ultimate Relationship" Donald Lawrence feat. Lalah Hathaway	20 Year Celebration, Vol. 1: Best for Last
2013	"Jesus Children" Robert Glasper Experiment feat. Lalah Hathaway and Malcolm-Jamal Warner	Black Radio 2
2013	"Have Yourself a Merry Little Christmas" John Stoddart feat. Lalah Hathaway	Only on Christmas Day
2014	"Waiting in Vain" Dianne Reeves feat. Lalah Hathaway	Beautiful Life
2014	"Sweet Baby" Al Jarreau feat. Lalah Hathaway	My Old Friend: Celebrating George Duke
2014	"If This World Were Mine" Ruben Studdard feat. Lalah Hathaway	Unconditional Love
2015	"We Are Young, Gifted & Black" Common feat. Lalah Hathaway	Nina Revisited...A Tribute to Nina Simone
2015	"Nothing Like You" Kenny Lattimore feat. Lalah Hathaway	Anatomy of A Love Song
2015	"Momma" Kendrick Lamar (backing vocals by and sample of Lalah Hathaway)	To Pimp A Butterfly
2015	"Complexion (A Zulu Love)" Kendrick Lamar (backing vocals by Lalah Hathaway)	To Pimp A Butterfly
2015	"The Blacker the Berry" Kendrick Lamar (backing vocals by Lalah Hathaway)	To Pimp A Butterfly
2015	"This Too Will Pass" Terri Lyne Carrington feat. Lalah Hathaway	The Mosaic Project: Love and Soul
2015	"When" Kirk Franklin feat. Kim Burrell and Lalah Hathaway	Losing My Religion
2015	"Spark & Tingle" Malcolm-Jamal Warner feat. feat. Lalah Hathaway	Selfless
2016	"Oakland" Terrace Martin feat. Lalah Hathaway	Velvet Portraits
2016	"Insanity" Gregory Porter feat. Lalah Hathaway	Take Me to the Alley
2017	"Made for Love" Charlie Wilson feat. Lalah Hathaway	In It to Win It
2017	"Coming to Life" Esperanza Spalding feat. Lalah Hathaway	Exposure
2018	"Lovely Day" José James feat. Lalah Hathaway	Lean On Me
2019	"Reachin' 2 Much" Anderson .Paak feat. Lalah Hathaway	Ventura

== Soundtrack appearances ==
Year	Song	Album
1994	"Anyone Can Be a Hero"	Blankman Soundtrack
1996	"God Rest Ye Merry Gentlemen" (Lalah Hathaway, Marcus Miller, Joshua Redman)	World Christmas (Special Olympics)
1998	"On My Own" (Lalah Hathaway feat. Warren Wiebe)	Burt Bacharach... Applause "The Look of Love"
1999	"Looking Back on Your Love"	ELT Songs from L.A. (VA)
2000	"All This Time" (Lalah Hathaway feat. Marcus Miller)	Ladies Man
2003	"My Love (Holy Night)"	Cover Morning Musume: Hello Project in International
2010	"Sun"	For Colored Girls Soundtrack
2016	"Surrender"	Hidden Figures

== Music videos ==
- "Heaven Knows"
- "Baby Don't Cry"
- "Something"
- "Love Like This" (Grover Washington feat. Lalah Hathaway)
- "Let Me Love You"
- "Family Affair"
- "Let Go"
- "Dealing" (Eric Roberson feat. Lalah Hathaway)
- "Little Ghetto Boy"
- "Mirror"
- "Ghetto Boy" (Remix feat. Snoop Dogg & Robert Glasper)
- "I Can't Wait"
- "Honestly"
- "So In Love"

== Concert DVDs ==
- The Gospel According to Jazz Chapter 3 DVD (Kirk Whalum feat. Lalah Hathaway et al.) includes the 2011 Grammy winning song "It's What I Do"
