= Little Ghetto Boy =

Song by Earl DeRouen and Edward Howard

Song by Donny Hathaway

from the album Live and Come Back, Charleston Blue
- Released: February 1972
- Recorded: 1971
- Genre: Soul
- Label: Atlantic
- Songwriters: Earl DeRouen; Edward Howard
- Producers: Jerry Wexler; Arif Mardin

"Ghetto Boy"

Single by Lalah Hathaway featuring Snoop Dogg and Robert Glasper

from the album Live
- Released: January 22, 2016
- Recorded: 2015
- Genre: R&B; hip hop
- Label: eOne Music
- Songwriters: Lalah Hathaway, Calvin Broadus Jr., Robert Glasper
- Producer: Terrace Martin

Lalah Hathaway singles chronology
"If You Want To" (2011)	"Ghetto Boy" (2016)

"Little Ghetto Boy" is a soul song composed by Earl DeRouen and Edward Howard, and first recorded in 1971 by Donny Hathaway for his 1972 Live album. The song also appeared on the Come Back, Charleston Blue soundtrack later that year, in studio quality.

Forty-three years later, the song was then covered by Hathaway's daughter Lalah Hathaway for her 2015 Live album. The cover was then remixed in January 2016 under the title "Ghetto Boy" with a guest appearance from Snoop Dogg and Robert Glasper, and was released via eOne Music.

== Meaning ==
The song depicts the devastation of those underprivileged, while speaking about the courage and resilience in the state of struggle, inspiring one to rise above their circumstances.

== Inspiration ==
When speaking on her cover version, Lalah Hathaway stated that the inspiration came from her father, saying: "The truth of the song rings the same today as it did forty years ago. The fact that I can deliver this truth with the same conviction my father felt all those years ago is extraordinary."

== Campaign ==
Lalah Hathaway formed a campaign for people to share art, music, poetry, sculptures, photos, etc.) inspired by the song.

== Awards ==
Lalah's cover version won the 2016 Grammy Award for Best Traditional R&B Performance, while its parent album also received a Grammy a year later.
