= Tiffany Gouché =

American singer (born 1988)

- Born: Tiffany Venise Gouché; September 20, 1988 (age 37); Inglewood, California
- Genres: R&B; soul; neo soul
- Occupations: Singer; songwriter; record producer
- Instruments: Piano; guitar
- Years active: 2012–present

Tiffany Gouché (born September 20, 1988), also known as TGooch, is an American singer, songwriter, and producer from Inglewood, California.

== Early life ==
Tiffany Gouché was born on September 20, 1988 in Inglewood, California. Gouché comes from a family she has described as musical and Christian. She is the cousin of both Inglewood musicians SiR, and Netflix's Rhythm + Flow inaugural winner D Smoke. Growing up, the family would often perform together singing Gospel and jazz. In 2007, Gouché with her cousins formed a music collective by the name of Woodworks.

== Career ==
Gouché garnered attention with her 2015 EP Pillow Talk. She has worked or shared the stage with Masego, Ty Dolla $ign, Solange, Anderson .Paak, Jill Scott, Lauryn Hill, Missy Elliott, Iggy Azalea, Usher, JMSN, Pussycat Dolls and Terrace Martin.

Gouché produced the entirety of Lalah Hathaway's 2017 Honestly.

Gouché also collaborated with Terrace Martin on his Grammy-nominated Velvet Portraits.

She is featured on the Little Simz tracks "Closer", "Just a Dose", and "Heart Said".

While LionHeart featured songs sung from a heterosexual perspective (possibly because the mixtape was made up of polished demos of songs written for other artists), Gouché's later releases have fully embraced her lesbian identity.

== Personal life ==
Gouché's mother died when she was 14 years old.

Gouché is queer.

Gouché's cousin, singer SiR, signed with Top Dawg Entertainment in 2017.

== Discography ==
=== Studio albums ===
- LionHeart (2012)
- Fantasy (2014)
- Pillow Talk (2015)
- The Found Album (2023)

=== Extended plays ===
- Dive/Down (2017)

=== As producer ===
- This Joy by Resistance Revival Chorus (2020)
- Honestly by Lalah Hathaway (2017)
- "The Lights" by Little Simz (2015)
- "Heart Said" by Little Simz (2015)
- Seven Sundays by SiR (2015)
- "Closer" by Little Simz (2014)

=== As collaborator ===
- "Queen Tings" with Masego (2018)
- "Love on Replay" with Kenyon Dixon (2022)

=== As featured artist ===
- "Oracle" by Issa Ali 9also featuring Jessica Care Moore) (2021)
- "Shine" by Robert Glasper (also featuring D Smoke) (2021)
- "Love is You" by E R N E (2021)
- "End Love" by Gabe Pigeé (2021)
- "Ain't You" by D Smoke (2019)
- "Pastor" by JAG (2019)
- "Shit Covered in Gold" by Mac Ayres (2019)
- "It's a Man's World" by SiR (also featuring Asiahn) (2019)
- "Are You Listening" by SiR (2017)
- "Never Enough" by Terrace Martin (2016)
- "Heart Said" by Little Simz (2015)
- "Just a Dose" by Little Simz (2014)
- "Closer" by Little Simz (2014)
- "Bring it Back" by SiR (2014)
- "Gone" by Terrace Martin (2013)
- "In the Sky" by Terrace Martin (also featuring Emon) (2011)
- "Galaxy" by Ill Camille (2011)

=== As songwriter ===
- "Shine" by Robert Glasper (2021)
- "You Ain't Ready" by SiR (2015)
- "Jahraymecofasola" by Jill Scott (2015)
- "Closer" by Little Simz (2014)
- "In the Sky" by Terrace Martin (also featuring Emon) (2011)
- "Takin' Over the World" by The Pussycat Dolls (2008)
- "How We Do It (In the UK) Remix" by Lloyd (2008)

=== Vocal credits ===
- "Dat Feelin'" by Chris Dave and the Drumhedz (2018)
- Honestly by Lalah Hathaway (2017)
- "Set it Off" by Casey Veggies (2015)
- "Let Me" by Iman Omari (2014)
- "Testify" by Iman Omari (2013)
- The Way You See by Jackie Gouché (2008)
