= My Heart Is Yours (disambiguation) =

"My Heart Is Yours" is a song by Didrik Solli-Tangen, Norwegian entry in the Eurovision Song Contest 2010.

My Heart Is Yours may also refer to:

- "My Heart Is Yours" (Passion song), 2014
- "My Heart Is Yours", 1970 single by Wilbert Harrison
- "My Heart Is Yours", 2010 single by Justin Nozuka
- "My Heart Is Yours", song by American R&B singer Vesta Williams from Vesta
- My Heart Is Yours, 1990 album by Doyle Lawson
- My Heart is Yours (TV series), 2014 Mexican telenovela

== See also ==
- "Yours Is My Heart Alone", an aria from the 1929 operetta The Land of Smiles
- "My Heart Is Set on You", a 1990 song by Lionel Cartwright
- Dil Bhi Tera Hum Bhi Tere (lit. 'My Heart Is Yours, So Am'), a 1960 Indian Hindi-language film by Arjun Hingorani, starring Dharmendra in his debut
