= Lalah Hathaway Live =

Live album by Lalah Hathaway
- Released: October 30, 2015
- Length: 78:49
- Label: Hathaway Entertainment; eOne

Lalah Hathaway chronology
Where It All Begins (2011)	Lalah Hathaway Live (2015)	Honestly (2017)

Singles from Lalah Hathaway Live
- 1. "Angel" Released: August 7, 2015; 2. "Little Ghetto Boy" Released: January 22, 2016

Lalah Hathaway Live is the first live album by American singer Lalah Hathaway. It was released on October 30, 2015 through her own label, Hathaway Entertainment, and eOne. The album won Best R&B Album at the 59th Annual Grammy Awards in February 2017. She also earned a Grammy for Best Traditional R&B Performance for her cover of "Angel" by Anita Baker.

It is the spiritual successor to her father Donny's Live, which was recorded in 1972. In addition to her own songs, there are covers of many songs by artists like Baker ("Angel"), Luther Vandross ("Forever, for Always, for Love"), Vesta Williams ("I'm Coming Back"), Randy Crawford ("When Your Life Was Low"), as well as her father's hits ("Little Ghetto Boy" and "You Were Meant for Me").

== Critical reception ==
Professional ratings
Review scores
Source	Rating
AllMusic	4/5 stars

AllMusic editor Andy Kellman rated the album four out of five stars. He wrote: "Like her father's album [Live], Lalah's includes a performance of "Little Ghetto Boy," and the faithful version here opens a set that easily bounces from point to point in her discography. Among the standouts are the consecutive "Baby Don't Cry" and "I'm Coming Back," both originally recorded for Lalah Hathaway, and an 11-minute version of Luther Vandross' "Forever, for Always, for Love" that best displays the increased depth and richness of Hathaway's voice [...] Topped off with a pair of new, high-quality studio cuts that help fill the compact disc edition to capacity, this is essential for Hathaway fans."

SoulTracks critic L. Michael Gipson note that "compared to what is currently in the marketplace, discovering this album is akin to striking oil in the Dakotas. Lalah Hathaway's enormous talent and technical proficiency are all evident throughout and Hathaway at 80% is better than too many to name at their fullest throttle [...] Perhaps the potential success of this project will encourage Hathaway to make more than one live recording, outside of the revered guest spots on Marcus Miller's and Kirk Whalum's respective concert recordings. Her own legacy, independent of her father's, certainly deserves it."

== Commercial performance ==
Lalah Hathaway Live debuted at number 33 on the US Billboard 200 chart in the week of November 11, 2015, selling 15,000 copies in its first week. It also debuted at number two on the Top R&B/Hip-Hop Albums and number three on the Independent Albums chart, marking her highest-charting set yet on the former chart, while becoming her first entry on the latter.

== Track listing ==
Lalah Hathaway Live track listing
No.	Title	Writer(s)	Length
1.	"Little Ghetto Boy"	Earl DeRouen; Edward Howard	3:56
2.	"Baby Don't Cry"	Angela Winbush	3:21
3.	"Change Ya Life"	Gary Taylor	8:01
4.	"You Were Meant for Me"	William Peterkin	4:29
5.	"Angel"	Patrick Moten; Sandra Sully	5:42
6.	"These Are the Things"	Keith Crouch	3:01
7.	"Little Girl"/"Breathe"	Hathaway; Michael Ripoll; Rahsaan Patterson; Rex Rideout; Sandra St. Victor	6:29
8.	"This Is Your Life"	Hathaway; Jonathan Richmond; Juanita Wynn	5:11
9.	"When Your Life Was Low"	Joe Sample; Will Jennings	7:03
10.	"Forever, for Always, for Love"	Luther Vandross	11:14
11.	"Lean on Me" (featuring Robert Glasper)	Hathaway; Crouch	7:20
12.	"Mirror"	Hathaway; David Gaines; Guordan Banks	3:53

Bonus tracks
No.	Title	Writer(s)	Length
13.	"Brand New"	Hathaway; Ben Jones; Vula Malinga	5:45
14.	"Whatever"	Hathaway; DJ Camper; Al Sherrod Lambert; Fields Blanchard Jr.; Saeed Renaud; Varren Wade	3:35
Total length:			78:49

Best Buy exclusive bonus tracks
No.	Title	Writer(s)	Length
15.	"Give It to Me"	Hathaway; Jones; Malinga	5:04
16.	"Love Don't Love Nobody"	Camper; Corey Woods	3:11

== Personnel ==
- Lalah Hathaway – vocals
- Michael Aaberg – keyboards, organ
- Dennis Clark – vocals
- Brian Collier – drums
- Errol Cooney – guitar
- DJ Spark – DJ
- Ben Jones – bass, guitar
- Vula Malinga – vocal arrangements, vocals
- Jason Morales – vocals
- Jairus Mozee – guitar
- Phil Peskett – piano
- Eric Seats – drums
- Eric Smith – bass
- Bobby Sparks II – keyboards, organ
- Stacey Lamont Sydnor – percussion
- Lynette Williams – keyboards

=== Production ===
- Producers: Darhyl Camper, Divageek, Lalah Hathaway, Ben Jones, Eric Smith
- Engineers: Les Cooper, Anthony Jeffries, Benita Lewis (mixing engineer), Coobie Lewis (mastering, mixing), Josh Lewis, Jimi Randolph (monitor engineer), Jeremy Underwood, Brian Vibberts

== Charts ==
Chart performance for Lalah Hathaway Live
Chart (2015–16)	Peak position
US Billboard 200	33
US Independent Albums (Billboard)	3
US Top R&B/Hip-Hop Albums (Billboard)	2

== Release history ==
Release dates and formats for Lalah Hathaway Live
Region	Date	Format(s)	Label	Ref.
United States	October 30, 2015	CD; digital download	Hathaway Entertainment; eOne	
