= Where It All Begins (Lalah Hathaway album) =

Studio album by Lalah Hathaway
- Released: October 18, 2011
- Length: 54:55
- Label: Stax
- Producer: Mike City; Errol Cooney; Dre & Vidal; Ernest Green; Lalah Hathaway; JR Hutson; Phil Ramone; Jonathan Richmond; Bobby Sparks

Lalah Hathaway chronology
Self Portrait (2008)	Where It All Begins (2011)	Lalah Hathaway Live (2015)

Singles from Where It All Begins
- 1. "If You Want to" Released: August 13, 2011; 2. "You Were Meant For Me"; 3. "My Everything"

"Where It All Begins" is the sixth studio album by American singer Lalah Hathaway. It was released on Stax Records and Concord Music Group on October 18, 2011.

== Background ==
An homage to her father Donny Hathaway, the artwork for Where It All Begins features a collage of her father album covers, with Hathaway inserted in place of her father on most of them. In addition to family photos depicted throughout the booklet, the album features a cover version of Donny Hathaway's "You Were Meant for Me," the original of which was issued as a single a few months prior to his death. Where It All Begins also features a remake of the song "I'm Coming Back" with Rachelle Ferrell, originally recorded by Vesta Williams for her 1986 album Vesta as well a remake of Hathaway's own "I’m Coming Back," first released in 1991.

== Critical reception ==
Professional ratings
Review scores
Source	Rating
AllMusic	4/5 stars
PopMatters	3/10 stars

AllMusic editor Andy Kellman found that Where It All Begins "picks up where 2008'sSelf Portrait left off, though the pop-R&B-type moves – buzzing synthesizers, harder beats – are a little more pronounced. "If You Want To," a gleaming disco-funk track co-written by Rahsaan Patterson, is the best of that lot; the remainder of the album’s highlights are relatively subdued, led by the gliding, atmospheric title track – a stunning throwback to lyrically inward, sonically otherworldly soul-jazz of the '70s."

Elias Leight from PopMatters felt that "though [Hathaway] tries her hand at a number of styles, her results are all similarly unimaginative. It is hard to pinpoint exactly where Hathaway goes wrong, but Where It All Begins is uninteresting. At a time when exciting new things are happening on many fronts of R&B, Hathaway offers a dull tour through the overdone and the bland."

== Chart performance ==
Where It All Begins debuted and peaked at number 32 on the US Billboard 200 in the week of November 5, 2011, becoming Hathaway's highest-charting album yet. It also reached number seven on the Billboard's Top R&B/Hip-Hop Albums chart, making it her second album to reach the top ten.

== Track listing ==
Where It All Begins track listing
No.	Title	Writer(s)	Producer(s)	Length
1.	"Strong Woman"	Andre Harris; Vidal Davis; Dave Young; Bryan Sledge	Dre & Vidal	3:07
2.	"Where It All Begins"	Lalah Hathaway; Ernest Green	Hathaway; Green	5:45
3.	"My Everything"	Hathaway; Jonathan Richmond	Hathaway; Richmond	4:12
4.	"Small of My Back"	Lee Hutson, Jr.	JR Hutson	4:47
5.	"If You Want to"	Hathaway; Richmond; Rahsaan Patterson; Terrence Lilly	Hathaway; Richmond	3:28
6.	"Always Love You"	Michael Flowers	Mike City	4:08
7.	"Lie to Me"	Harris; Davis; Edwin Serrano; Rich King	Dre & Vidal	4:33
8.	"This Could Be Love"	Hathaway; Green; Lewis Williams	Hathaway; Green; Bobby Sparks	4:52
9.	"Wrong Way"	James Fauntleroy II; Hutson	Hutson	3:44
10.	"You Were Meant for Me"	William James Peterkin	Hathaway; Phil Ramone	4:03
11.	"I'm Coming Back" (featuring Rachelle Ferrell)	Gary Taylor	Hathaway; Ramone	6:57
12.	"Dreamland"	Hathaway; Errol Cooney; James Day	Hathaway; Cooney	5:19
Total length:				54:55

Apple Music bonus tracks
No.	Title	Writer(s)	Producer(s)	Length
13.	"My Heart"	Flowers	City	3:42
14.	"This Could Be Love" (The Wednesday Mix)	Hathaway; Green; Williams	Hathaway; Green; Sparks	7:39

Best Buy bonus tracks
No.	Title	Writer(s)	Producer(s)	Length
13.	"Lose Yourself"	Flowers	City	4:03
14.	"We're All in This Together"	Flowers	City

== Charts ==
Chart performance for Where It All Begins
Chart (2011)	Peak position
US Billboard 200	32
US Top R&B/Hip-Hop Albums (Billboard)	7

== Release history ==
Release dates and formats for Where It All Begins
Region	Date	Format(s)	Label	Ref.
United States	October 18, 2011	CD; digital download	Stax	
