= Vesta 4 U =

Studio album by Vesta Williams
- Released: November 21, 1988
- Studios: Skip Saylor Recording, Motown/Hitsville U.S.A. Recording Studios
- Length: 46:58
- Label: A&M
- Producers: Attala Zane Giles; David Crawford; Tena Clark

Vesta Williams chronology
Vesta (1986)	Vesta 4 U (1988)	Special (1991)

Professional ratings
Review scores
Source	Rating
AllMusic	3/5 stars

Vesta 4 U is the second studio album by American R&B singer Vesta Williams, released on November 21, 1988, on A&M Records.

== Commercial performance ==
The album peaked at No. 131 on the Billboard 200 and 26 on Top R&B Albums chart. Four singles were released from the album, with three reaching R&B top ten. "Sweet, Sweet Love" and "Congratulations" were both R&B hits, peaking top five on Billboard's Hot R&B Singles chart. Williams scored her only charting pop song with "Congratulations", peaking to number 55 on the Billboard Hot 100.

== Track listing ==
Side one
No.	Title	Writer(s)	Length
1.	"Here/Say"	Attala Zane Giles, Vesta Williams	4:57
2.	"All on You"	Attala Zane Giles, Vesta Williams	4:11
3.	"4 U"	Attala Zane Giles	5:15
4.	"Sweet, Sweet Love"	Attala Zane Giles, Vesta Williams, Billy Osborne	5:37

Side two
No.	Title	Writer(s)	Length
5.	"How You Feel"	Attala Zane Giles, Vesta Williams	5:01
6.	"Best I Ever Had"	Vesta Williams, Eric Daniels	4:06
7.	"Hunger"	Vesta Williams, David Crawford	4:29
8.	"Congratulations"	Tena Clark, Gary Prim, Vesta Williams	4:25
9.	"Running into Memories"	Tena Clark, Gary Prim, Vesta Williams	4:20

== Charts ==
=== Weekly charts ===
Weekly chart performance for Vesta 4 U
Chart (1989)	Peak position
US Billboard 200	131
US Top R&B/Hip-Hop Albums (Billboard)	26

=== Year-end charts ===
Year-end chart performance for Vesta 4 U
Chart (1989)	Position
US Top R&B/Hip-Hop Albums (Billboard)	44

Singles

Chart performance for singles from Special
Year	Single	Chart	Position
1988	"Sweet, Sweet Love"	Hot R&B Singles	4
1989	"4 U"	Hot R&B Singles	9
1989	"Congratulations"	Billboard Hot 100	55
1989	"Congratulations"	Hot R&B Singles	5
1989	"How You Feel"	Hot R&B Singles	70
