= Congratulations (Vesta song) =

1989 single by Vesta

Single by Vesta

from the album Vesta 4 U
- B-side: "Once Bitten, Twice Shy"
- Released: 1989
- Recorded: 1988
- Genre: R&B
- Length: 4:27
- Label: A&M
- Songwriter(s): Vesta Williams; Tena Clark; Gary Prim
- Producer(s): Tena Clark

Vesta singles chronology
"Sweet, Sweet Love" (1988)	"Congratulations" (1989)	"Do Ya" (1991)

"Congratulations" is a song co-written and performed by American contemporary R&B singer Vesta Williams (then known mononymously as Vesta), issued as the third and final official single from her second studio album Vesta 4 U. It was her only single to appear on the Billboard Hot 100, peaking at #55 on the chart in 1989.

== Chart positions ==
Chart (1989)	Peak position
US Billboard Hot 100	55
US Hot R&B/Hip-Hop Singles & Tracks (Billboard)	5
