= Special (Vesta Williams album) =

Studio album by Vesta Williams
- Released: July 29, 1991
- Length: 57:28
- Label: A&M
- Producer: Attala Zane Giles; David Crawford; Tena Clark

Vesta Williams chronology
Vesta 4 U (1988)	Special (1991)	Everything-N-More (1993)

Professional ratings
Review scores
Source	Rating
AllMusic	3/5 stars
Entertainment Weekly	B

Special is the third studio album by American R&B singer Vesta Williams, released on A&M Records on July 29, 1991.

== Commercial performance ==
The album peaked to number 15 on Billboard's Top R&B Albums chart. William's scored her biggest charting R&B hit with the lead single, "Special", peaking at number two on Billboard's Top R&B Singles chart.

== Track listing ==
All tracks are written by Vesta Williams and Attalla Zane Gilles, except where noted.

Special track listing
No.	Title	Length
1.	"Special"	5:06
2.	"I Don't Wanna Cry Anymore"	5:20
3.	"Person to Person"	5:03
4.	"Can't Get Enough of Your Love"	4:31
5.	"Where Does the Love Go?" (Vesta Williams, Dean Gant)	5:04
6.	"Thank You for the Chance" (Vesta Williams, Tena Clark, Gary Prim)	3:59
7.	"The Rib Joint"	2:48
8.	"TLC"	4:37
9.	"Do Ya"	5:35
10.	"Dont Trip" (Vesta Williams, Attalla Zane Gilles, L. Haggard)	5:38
11.	"Compassion"	6:28
12.	"I Promise Love" (Vesta Williams, Attalla Zane Gilles, Cornelius Mims)	5:19

== Charts ==
=== Weekly charts ===
Weekly chart performance for Special
Chart (1991)	Peak position
US Top R&B/Hip-Hop Albums (Billboard)	15

=== Year-end charts ===
Year-end chart performance for Special
Chart (1991)	Position
US Top R&B/Hip-Hop Albums (Billboard)	79

=== Singles ===
Chart performance for singles from Special
Year	Single	Chart	Position
1991	"Special"	Hot R&B Singles	2
1991	"Do Ya"	Hot R&B Singles	43
