= Made in Chicago (Lalah Hathaway album) =

Made In Chicago

Studio album by Lalah Hathaway
- Released: October 1, 2026
- Genres: R&B; Soul
- Length: 39:22
- Labels: Hathaway Entertainment; SRG-ILS Group; Virgin Music Group
- Producers: Lalah Hathaway; Phil Beaudreau

Lalah Hathaway chronology
Vantablack (2024)	Made In Chicago (2026)

Singles from Made In Chicago
- 1. "47th Street" Released: August 7, 2026; 2. "Can't Let Go" Released: August 28, 2026

Made In Chicago is the ninth studio album by Lalah Hathaway. The album was released on October 1, 2026. This date coincides with the birthdate of the artist's father Donny Hathaway, himself a significant figure in American soul music. Hathaway describes the album as a tribute to her origins in Chicago, Illinois. The lead single "47th Street" featuring poet J. Ivy was released August 8, 2026; its title references the street in Chicago where Hathaway's family lived.

Hathaway told producer Phil Beaudreau, “I wanted to write a Chicago record, but it had to be a mixture of the actual city of Chicago and the actual music that I grew up listening to in Chicago. Because that, for me, is the most salient point, the most important point. He presented ’47th Street’ to me and it just sounded so ballsy, and it sounded like it was ready to fight.”

Second single "Can't Let Go" was released August 28, 2026.

== Track listing ==
All tracks are written and produced by Lalah Hathaway and Phil Beaudreau, except where noted.

No.	Title	Writer(s)	Length
1.	"47th Street" (featuring J. Ivy)	Lalah Hathaway; Phil Beaudreau; James Ivy Richardson	03:49
2.	"So Smart"		04:16
3.	"Follow"	Eric Dawkins; Aaron Sledge; Berris Bolton	03:26
4.	"Can't Let Go"		04:00
5.	"Every Little Thing"	Beaudreau; Amber Navran; Michael Louis Aaberg; Justin Tyson; Errol Cooney; Eric Smith	05:57
6.	"Rainbo"		04:07
7.	"Someday"		03:30
8.	"Time"		03:25
9.	"Magic"		06:52
Total length:			39:22

== Personnel ==
- Lalah Hathaway - vocals
- Phil Beaudreau - trumpet, guitar, background vocals, percussion, mixing engineer, mastering engineer, programming
- Amber Navran - saxophone
- Hailey Niswanger - saxophone
- Elena Pinderhughes - flutist
- Justin Tyson - drums
- Roland Gajate Garcia - percussion
- Eric "Pikfunk" Smith - guitar, bass
- Errol Cooney - guitar
- Michael Aaberg - piano, rhodes
- MAE.SUN - tenor saxophone
- J. Ivy - spoken word
