= Grammy Award for Best Traditional R&B Performance =

Accolade presented at the Grammy Awards

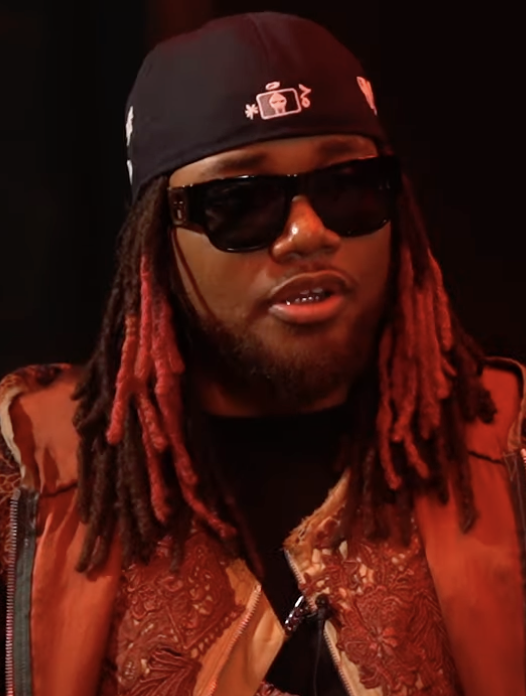
- "Vibes Don't Lie" by Leon Thomas is the most recent recipient
- Awarded for: quality traditional R&B vocal performances
- Country: United States
- Presented by: National Academy of Recording Arts and Sciences
- First award: 1999
- Currently held by: Leon Thomas – "Vibes Don't Lie" (2026)
- Website: grammy.com

The Grammy Award for Best Traditional R&B Performance is an accolade presented at the Grammy Awards, a ceremony that was established in 1958 and originally named the Gramophone Awards, to performers of quality traditional R&B vocal performances. The award was first given in 1999; until 2003, only albums were nominated, now just singles or tracks are. Honors in several categories are presented at the ceremony annually by the National Academy of Recording Arts and Sciences of the United States to "honor artistic achievement, technical proficiency and overall excellence in the recording industry, without regard to album sales or chart position." As of the 67th Annual Grammy Awards, the eligibility criteria for the category was amended to "more accurately represent recordings that embody the classical elements of R&B/soul music, distinguishing them from contemporary interpretations of the genre".

Between 1999 and 2002, this accolade was originally known as Best Traditional R&B Vocal Album. It was renamed in 2003 as Best Traditional R&B Vocal Performance. Since 2012, the category has been known as Best Traditional R&B Performance.

The award goes to the artist. The producer, engineer and songwriter can apply for a Winners Certificate.

As of the 69th Annual Grammy Awards, Lalah Hathaway and Beyoncé have the most wins (3) in this category, and Hathaway has the most nominations (7) in this category. At the 66th Annual Grammy Awards, two-year-old Hazel Monét became the youngest ever Grammy nominee for her feature on her mother's song, "Hollywood".

== Recipients ==
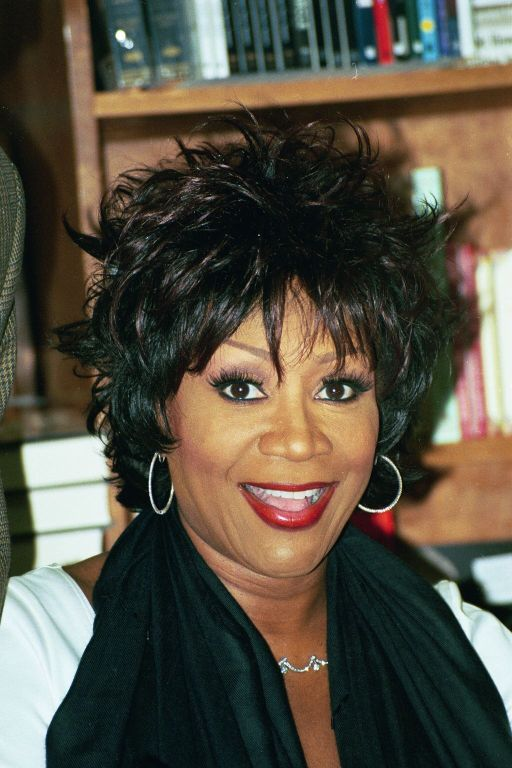
Patti LaBelle was the first recipient of the award.

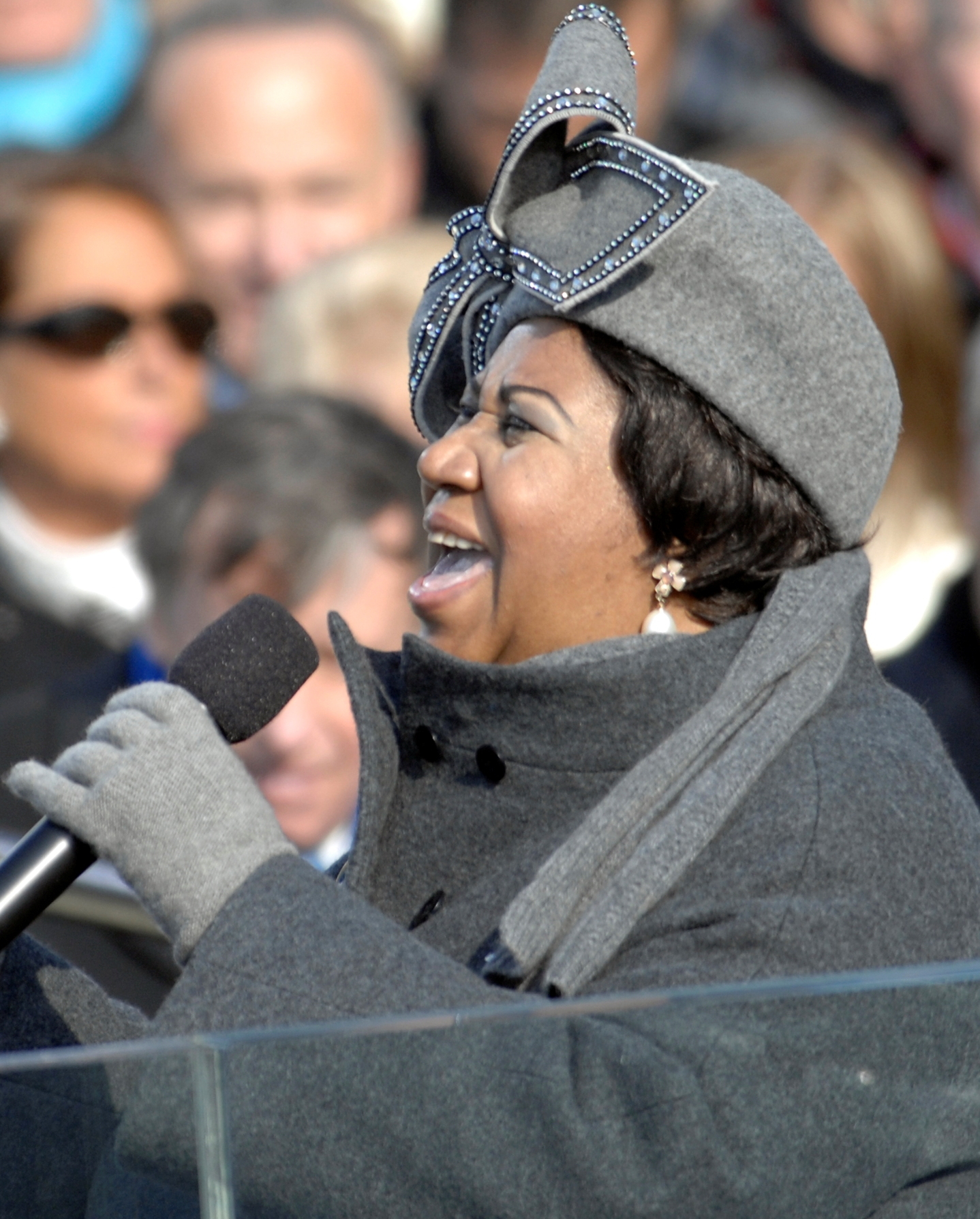
Aretha Franklin is the second most awarded artist in the category, with two wins.

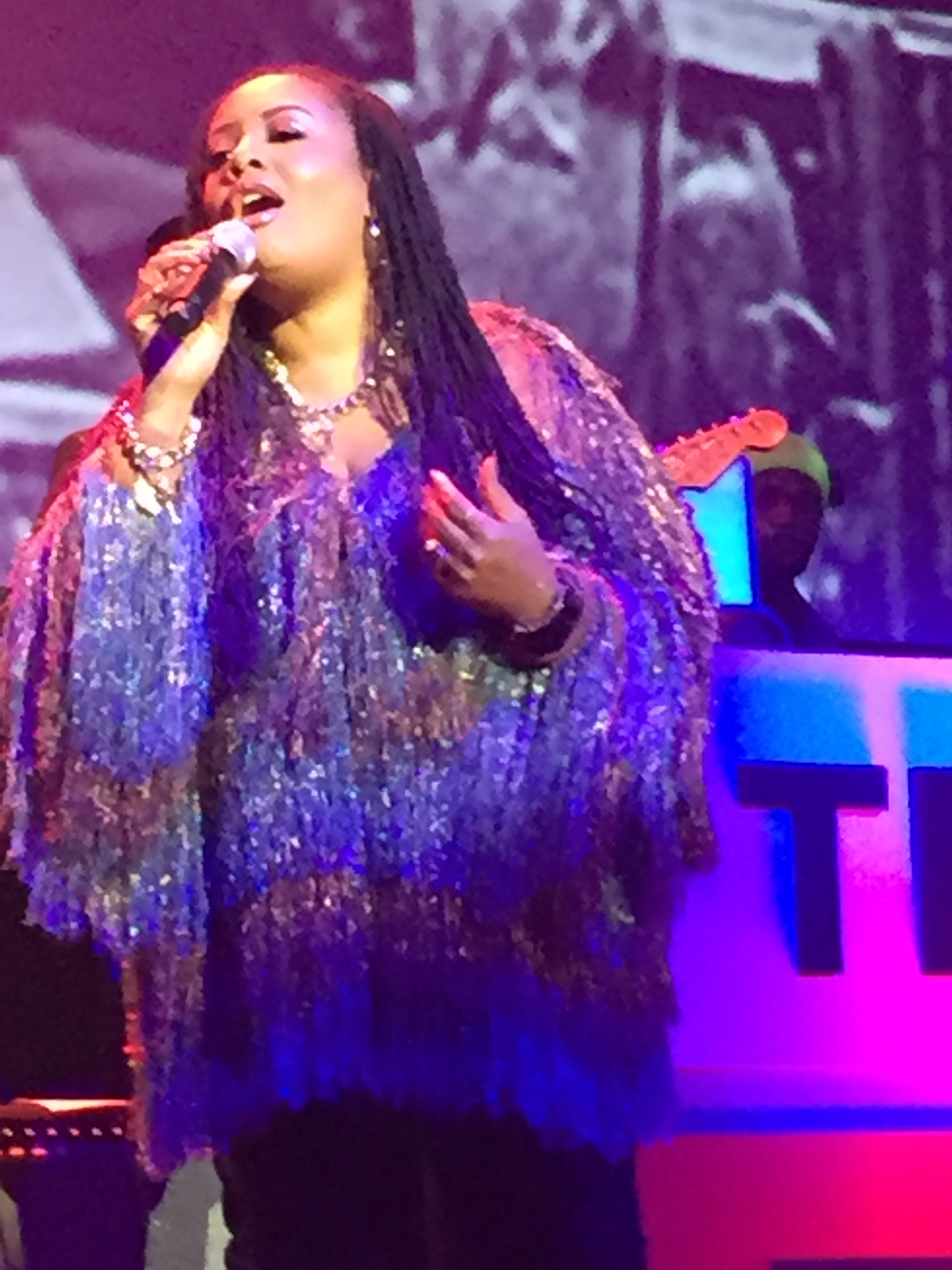
Lalah Hathaway is tied with Beyoncé as the most awarded artist in this category, with three wins.

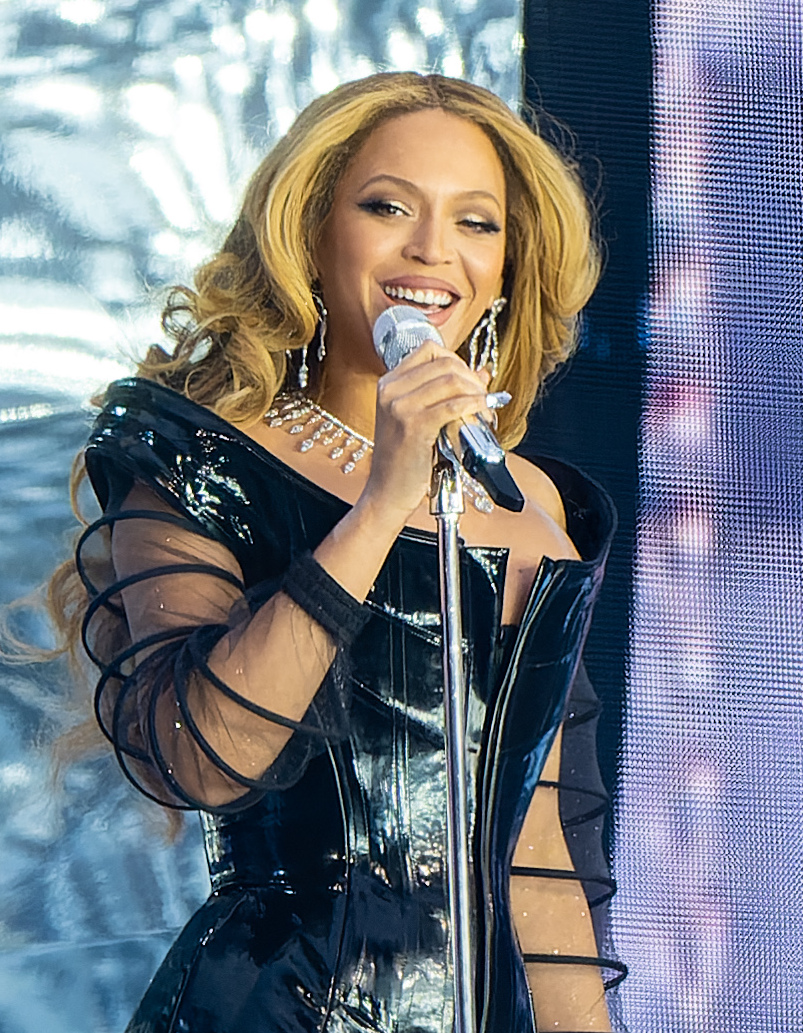
Beyoncé is tied with Lalah Hathaway as the most awarded artist in this category, with three wins.

=== 1990s ===
Year	Artist	Work
1999
1999	Patti LaBelle	Live! One Night Only
1999	Regina Belle	Believe in Me
1999	Aaron Neville	To Make Me Who I Am
1999	The Temptations	Phoenix Rising
1999	Luther Vandross	I Know

=== 2000s ===
Year	Artist	Work
2000
2000	Barry White	Staying Power
2000	Peabo Bryson	Unconditional Love
2000	The Neville Brothers	Valence Street
2000	Wilson Pickett	It's Harder Now
2000	Smokey Robinson	Intimate
2001
2001	The Temptations	Ear-Resistible
2001	Will Downing	All the Man You Need
2001	George Duke	Cool
2001	Jeffrey Osborne	That's for Sure
2001	Johnnie Taylor	Gotta Get the Groove Back
2002
2002	Gladys Knight	At Last
2002	Regina Belle	This Is Regina!
2002	Lamont Dozier	An American Original
2002	Miki Howard	Three Wishes
2002	The O'Jays	For the Love...
2003
2003	Chaka Khan and the Funk Brothers	"What's Going On"
2003	Ann Nesby and Al Green	"Put It on Paper"
2003	Remy Shand	"Rocksteady"
2003	The Temptations	"Lady"
2003	Luther Vandross	"Any Day Now"
2004
2004	Aretha Franklin	"Wonderful"
2004	Earth, Wind & Fire	"Hold Me"
2004	Anthony Hamilton	"Comin' from Where I'm From"
2004	Patti LaBelle	"Way Up There"
2004	Kelly Price	"He Proposed"
2005
2005	Prince	"Musicology"
2005	Anita Baker	"You're My Everything"
2005	Ray Charles and B.B. King	"Sinner's Prayer"
2005	Al Green	"I Can't Stop"
2005	Patti LaBelle	"New Day"
2006
2006	Aretha Franklin	"A House Is Not a Home"
2006	Mariah Carey	"Mine Again"
2006	Fantasia	"Summertime"
2006	Alicia Keys	"If I Was Your Woman"
2006	John Legend	"Stay with You"
2007
2007	George Benson and Al Jarreau featuring Jill Scott	"God Bless the Child"
2007	Anita Baker	"Christmas Time Is Here"
2007	Mary J. Blige and Raphael Saadiq	"I Found My Everything"
2007	Sam Moore, Billy Preston, Zucchero, Eric Clapton and Robert Randolph	"You Are So Beautiful"
2007	The Temptations	"How Sweet It Is (to Be Loved by You)"
2008
2008	Gerald Levert	"In My Songs"
2008	Otis Clay	"Walk a Mile in My Shoes"
2008	Randy Crawford and Joe Sample	"All Night Long"
2008	Ann Nesby	"I Apologize"
2008	Ryan Shaw	"I Am Your Man"
2009
2009	Al Green featuring Anthony Hamilton	"You've Got the Love I Need"
2009	Wayne Brady	"A Change Is Gonna Come"
2009	Linda Jones, Helen Bruner and Terry Jones	"Baby I Know"
2009	Raphael Saadiq	"Love That Girl"
2009	Jazmine Sullivan	"In Love with Another Man"

=== 2010s ===
Year	Artist	Work
2010
2010	Beyoncé	"At Last"
2010	Anthony Hamilton	"Soul Music"
2010	Boney James and Quinn	"Don't Let Me Be Lonely Tonight"
2010	Ann Nesby	"Sow Love"
2010	Calvin Richardson	"Woman Gotta Have It"
2011
2011	John Legend and the Roots	"Hang on in There"
2011	R. Kelly	"When a Woman Loves"
2011	Calvin Richardson	"You're So Amazing"
2011	Ryan Shaw	"In Between"
2011	Betty Wright	"Go" (Live)
2012
2012	CeeLo Green featuring Melanie Fiona	"Fool for You"
2012	Eric Benet	"Sometimes I Cry"
2012	R. Kelly	"Radio Message"
2012	Raphael Saadiq	"Good Man"
2012	Betty Wright and The Roots	"Surrender"
2013
2013	Beyoncé	"Love On Top"
2013	Anita Baker	"Lately"
2013	Melanie Fiona	"Wrong Side of a Love Song"
2013	Gregory Porter	"Real Good Hands"
2013	SWV	"If Only You Knew"
2014
2014	Gary Clark Jr.	"Please Come Home"
2014	Fantasia	"Get It Right"
2014	Maysa	"Quiet Fire"
2014	Gregory Porter	"Hey Laura"
2014	Ryan Shaw	"Yesterday"
2015
2015	Robert Glasper Experiment featuring Lalah Hathaway and Malcolm-Jamal Warner	"Jesus Children"
2015	Marsha Ambrosius and Anthony Hamilton	"As"
2015	Angie Fisher	"IRS"
2015	Kem	"Nobody"
2015	Antonique Smith	"Hold Up Wait a Minute (Woo Woo)"
2016
2016	Lalah Hathaway	"Little Ghetto Boy"
2016	Faith Evans	"He Is"
2016	Jazmine Sullivan	"Let It Burn"
2016	Tyrese	"Shame"
2016	Charlie Wilson	"My Favorite Part of You"
2017
2017	Lalah Hathaway	"Angel"
2017	William Bell	"The Three of Me"
2017	BJ the Chicago Kid	"Woman's World"
2017	Fantasia	"Sleeping with the One I Love"
2017	Jill Scott	"Can't Wait"
2018
2018	Childish Gambino	"Redbone"
2018	The Baylor Project	"Laugh and Move On"
2018	Anthony Hamilton featuring The Hamiltones	"What I'm Feelin'"
2018	Ledisi	"All the Way"
2018	Mali Music	"Still"
2019
2019	Leon Bridges (TIE)	"Bet Ain't Worth the Hand"
2019	PJ Morton featuring Yebba (TIE)	"How Deep Is Your Love"
2019	Bettye LaVette	"Don't Fall Apart on Me Tonight"
2019	Major	"Honest"
2019	Charlie Wilson featuring Lalah Hathaway	"Made for Love"

=== 2020s ===
Year	Artist	Work
2020
2020	Lizzo	"Jerome"
2020	BJ the Chicago Kid	"Time Today"
2020	India.Arie	"Steady Love"
2020	Lucky Daye	"Real Games"
2020	PJ Morton featuring Jazmine Sullivan	"Built for Love"
2021
2021	Ledisi	"Anything for You"
2021	The Baylor Project	"Sit on Down"
2021	Chloe x Halle	"Wonder What She Thinks of Me"
2021	Mykal Kilgore	"Let Me Go"
2021	Yebba	"Distance"
2022
2022	H.E.R.	"Fight for You"
2022	Jon Batiste	"I Need You"
2022	BJ the Chicago Kid, PJ Morton and Kenyon Dixon featuring Charlie Bereal	"Bring It on Home to Me"
2022	Leon Bridges featuring Robert Glasper	"Born Again"
2022	Lucky Daye featuring Yebba	"How Much Can a Heart Take"
2023
2023	Beyoncé	"Plastic Off the Sofa"
2023	Snoh Aalegra	"Do 4 Love"
2023	Babyface featuring Ella Mai	"Keeps on Fallin'"
2023	Adam Blackstone featuring Jazmine Sullivan	"'Round Midnight"
2023	Mary J. Blige	"Good Morning Gorgeous"
2024
2024	PJ Morton featuring Susan Carol	"Good Morning"
2024	Babyface featuring Coco Jones	"Simple"
2024	Kenyon Dixon	"Lucky"
2024	Victoria Monét featuring Earth, Wind & Fire and Hazel Monét	"Hollywood"
2024	SZA	"Love Language"
2025
2025	Lucky Daye	"That's You"
2025	Marsha Ambrosius	"Wet"
2025	Kenyon Dixon	"Can I Have This Groove"
2025	Lalah Hathaway featuring Michael McDonald	"No Lie"
2025	Muni Long	"Make Me Forget"
2026
2026	Leon Thomas	"Vibes Don't Lie"
2026	Durand Bernarr	"Here We Are"
2026	Lalah Hathaway	"Uptown"
2026	Ledisi	"Love You Too"
2026	SZA	"Crybaby"
2027
2027	Durand Bernarr	"I Found Myself"
2027	Lalah Hathaway	"Can't Let Go"
2027	Jill Scott	"Beautiful People"
2027	Leon Thomas	"My Muse"
2027	The Womack Sisters	"If I Let You"

^{^[I]} Each year is linked to the article about the Grammy Awards held that year.

== Artists with multiple nominations/wins ==
=== Multiple Wins ===
3 wins

- Beyoncé
- Lalah Hathaway

2 wins

- Aretha Franklin
- PJ Morton

=== Multiple Nominations ===
7 nominations
- Lalah Hathaway

5 nominations

- Anthony Hamilton

4 nominations

- PJ Morton

3 nominations

- Beyoncé
- Patti LaBelle
- The Temptations
- Anita Baker
- Raphael Saadiq
- Ryan Shaw
- Fantasia
- Ledisi
- Jill Scott
2 Nominations
- Aretha Franklin
- John Legend
- R. Kelly
- Calvin Richardson
- Betty Wright
- Melanie Fiona
- Gregory Porter
- Charlie Wilson
- Leon Bridges
- Leon Thomas
- Durand Bernarr

== See also ==
- List of Grammy Award categories
- List of R&B musicians
