= Heaven Knows (Lalah Hathaway song) =

Single by Lalah Hathaway

from the album Lalah Hathaway
- B-side: "U-Godit Gowin' On"
- Released: June 28, 1990
- Recorded: 1989–1990
- Genre: R&B
- Length: 5:17
- Label: Virgin
- Songwriter(s): Derek Bramble
- Producer(s): Derek Bramble

Lalah Hathaway singles chronology
"Inside the Beat" (1987)	"Heaven Knows" (1990)	"Baby Don't Cry" (1990)

"Heaven Knows" is a song performed by American contemporary R&B singer Lalah Hathaway, issued as the first single from her eponymous debut studio album. The song peaked at #3 on the Billboard R&B chart in 1990.

== Chart positions ==
=== Weekly charts ===
Chart (1990)	Peak position
US Hot Dance Music/Maxi-Singles Sales (Billboard)	35
US Hot R&B/Hip-Hop Songs (Billboard)	3

=== Year-end charts ===
Chart (1990)	Position
US Hot R&B/Hip-Hop Songs (Billboard)	28
