= Next Exit (album) =

Studio album by Grover Washington Jr.
- Released: 1992
- Studio: Various
- Genre: Jazz, R&B
- Length: 50:54
- Label: Columbia C 469088 1
- Producer: Grover Washington Jr., Bob Baldwin, Sergio George, Donald Robinson

Grover Washington Jr. chronology
Time Out of Mind (1989)	Next Exit (1992)	All My Tomorrows (1994)

Professional ratings
Review scores
Source	Rating
All About Jazz	4.5/5 stars
AllMusic	2/5 stars
The Penguin Guide to Jazz Recordings	2.5/4 stars
The Rolling Stone Jazz & Blues Album Guide	2/5 stars

Next Exit is a studio album by American jazz saxophonist Grover Washington Jr. The album was released in 1992 on Columbia Records label. Next Exit includes composition "Summer Chill" which was co-written by his son and nominated for a Grammy.

== Reception ==
Steve Aldrich of AllMusic commented "The man who wrote the book on R&B/fusion returns with yet another set of what he does best. Washington's sax shares time with vocal tracks featuring the likes of Nancy Wilson, Lalah Hathaway, and the Four Tops. A solid, if predictible outing". A reviewer of All About Jazz stated "Any Grover excursion is worth listening to and Next Exit is one of Grover's finer outings... There are so many wonderful tracks on this album that it is an essential addition to your own collection of you don't have it already. Fusion Jazz at its very finest and highly recommended by this veteran of the airwaves".

== Track listing ==
No.	Title	Writer(s)	Length
1.	"Take Five (Take Another Five)"	Paul Desmond	5:00
2.	"Your Love"	Randall Bowland, D. Richard Lewis, Donald Robinson	4:58
3.	"Only for You (Siempre Para Ti)"	Grover Washington, Jr., Richard Lee Steacker	5:14
4.	"Greene Street"	Joe McBride	4:49
5.	"Next Exit"	Grover Washington, Jr.	5:08
6.	"I Miss Home"	Bill Jolly	3:54
7.	"Love Like This"	Terry Cox	4:50
8.	"Summer Chill"	Grover Washington III, Grover Washington, Jr.	4:37
9.	"Till You Return to Me"	Bob Baldwin, Porter Carroll III	3:59
10.	"Get on Up"	John Bolden, Teddy Bolden	4:15
11.	"Check Out Grover"	Richard Lee Steacker	4:10
Total length:			50:54

== Personnel ==
- Grover Washington Jr. – alto saxophone (1, 3, 7, 11), tenor saxophone (2, 4, 5, 8, 9), soprano saxophone (3, 6, 10), arrangements (4), horn section (5, 8, 10), horn arrangements (5, 8, 11), backing vocals (10)
- John Bolden – keyboards (1, 5, 7, 10), keyboard bass (1, 5, 7, 10), percussion (1, 5, 7, 10), rhythm arrangements (1, 5, 7, 10), vocal arrangements (1, 7), horn arrangements (5, 10), drum programming (10), backing vocals (10)
- Teddy Bolden – keyboards (1, 5, 7, 10), drum programming (1, 5, 7, 10), percussion (1, 5, 7, 10), rhythm arrangements (1, 5, 7, 10), vocal arrangements (1, 7), horn arrangements (5, 10), backing vocals (10)
- Donald Robinson – keyboards (2), arrangements (2)
- Sergio George – acoustic piano (3), synthesizers (3), backing vocals (3), arrangements (3)
- Ramsey Lewis – grand piano (4)
- James McBride – keyboards (4), programming (4)
- Bill Jolly – keyboard programming (6), MIDI programming (6), arrangements (6)
- James Lloyd – keyboards (8, 11), keyboard bass (8)
- Bob Baldwin – keyboards (9), MIDI programming (9), drum programming (9), arrangements (9)
- Curtis Dowd – keyboards (11)
- Randy Bowland – guitars (2)
- Richard Lee Steacker – guitars (4, 6, 8, 11), arrangements (11)
- Doc Powell – guitars (7)
- Rodney Millon – guitars (10)
- Gerald Veasley – bass (2, 4, 6, 9)
- Ruben Rodriguez – bass (3)
- Cornelius Mims – bass (5)
- Keith Roster – bass (7, 10)
- Jim Salamone – drum programming (2, 8, 11), percussion programming (2), keyboard programming (8, 11), E-mu Emulator III programming (8, 11), sequencing (8, 11), arrangements (8, 11)
- Darryl Washington – drums (6)
- Robert Allende – percussion (3)
- Leonard Gibbs – percussion (4)
- Miguel Fuentes – percussion (6), congas (8)
- Kathleen Thomas – strings (2)
- Lewis Kahn – trombone (3)
- Jose "Ite" Jerez – trumpet (3)
- Grover Washington III – arrangements (8)
- Rich Figueroa – backing vocals (1, 7)
- Dionne Knighton – backing vocals (1, 7)
- Latesha Theirry – backing vocals (1, 7)
- Claude Woods – backing vocals (1, 7)
- Nancy Wilson – lead vocals (2)
- Annette Hardeman – backing vocals (2)
- Paula Holloway – backing vocals (2), lead vocals (11)
- Michelle Kornegay – backing vocals (2)
- Gabriela Anders – backing vocals (3)
- Chip Landry – backing vocals (3)
- Ray Sepúlveda – backing vocals (3)
- Lalah Hathaway – lead and backing vocals (7)
- Levi Stubbs – lead vocals (9)
- The Four Tops – backing vocals (9)
- Bunny Sigler – vocal arrangements and conductor (9)
- Doug E. Fresh – human beatbox (11)
- Man Slaughter – rap (11)

Strings on "Love Like This"

- Suzie Katayama – arrangements and conductor
- Sid Page – concertmaster, violin
- Maurice Grants – cello
- Roger Lebow – cello
- Joel Derouin – violin
- Berj Garabedian – violin
- Vanessa Kibbe – violin

== Production ==
- George Butler – executive producer
- Grover Washington Jr. – producer (1, 4–8, 10, 11), mixing (4, 6, 9)
- John Bolden – co-producer (1, 5, 7, 10), mixing (1, 5, 7, 10)
- Teddy Bolden – co-producer (1, 5, 7, 10), mixing (1, 5, 7, 10)
- Donald Robinson – producer (2), mixing (2)
- Sergio George – producer (3), mixing (3)
- Jim Salamone – co-producer (8, 11), recording (8, 11), mixing (8, 11)
- Grover Washington III – co-producer (8)
- Bob Baldwin – producer (9)
- Richard Lee Steacker – co-producer (11)
- Al Phillips – recording (1, 5, 7, 10), mixing (1, 5, 7, 10)
- Martin Schmelzle – recording (1, 5)
- Al Alberts Jr. – recording (2), mixing (2)
- John "Fig" Ficarotta – recording (3)
- Peter Humphreys – recording (3–7, 10), mixing (4, 6, 9), mastering
- David Lescoe – recording (3), mixing (3)
- Dan McKay – recording (7)
- Marty Lester – recording (7)
- Glenn Barratt – recording (8, 11), mixing (11)
- Mike Iacopelli – vocal recording (9)
- Scott MacMinn – recording (11)
- Bruce Weedon – mixing (8)
- Joe Nicolo – mixing (11)
- Brian Wittmer – assistant engineer (5, 7, 10)
- Craig Caruth – assistant engineer (8, 11)
- Yuval Kossovsky – assistant engineer (11)
- Ray Monahan – Pro Tools editing (11)
- Nimitr Sarkananda – mastering
- Paul Silverthorn – production coordinator
- Diane Delgado-Jorge – production assistant
- Mike Traylor – production assistant
- Elieen Whelihan – production assistant
- Carol Chen – art direction, design
- Frank Schramm – photography

== Charts ==
=== Weekly charts ===
Chart (1992)	Peak position
US Billboard 200	149
US Top R&B/Hip-Hop Albums (Billboard)	26
US Top Jazz Albums (Billboard)	1

=== Year-end charts ===
Chart (1992)	Position
US Top R&B/Hip-Hop Albums (Billboard)	96
