= A Moment =

Studio album by Lalah Hathaway
- Released: May 31, 1994
- Length: 56:48
- Label: Virgin
- Producer: Chuckii Booker; Bread and Butter; Keith Crouch; David Delhomme; Lalah Hathaway; Raymond Jones; Sami McKinney; Brian Alexander Morgan; K.C. Porter; Martyn Ware

Lalah Hathaway chronology
Lalah Hathaway (1990)	A Moment (1994)	The Song Lives On (1999)

Singles from A Moment
- 1. "Let Me Love You" Released: April 27, 1994; 2. "Separate Ways"/"Family Affair" Released: November 1, 1994

A Moment is the second studio album by American singer Lalah Hathaway. It was released by Virgin Records on May 31, 1994, in the United States.

== Promotion ==
The album's first single was "Let Me Love You," produced by Brian Alexander Morgan. A video was also shot for the single. The follow-up single was "Separate Ways," released as a double-A side single with "Family Affair." The Martyn Ware-produced "Family Affair" was actually released in 1991 and billed as "BEF featuring Lalah Hathaway".

== Critical reception ==
Professional ratings
Review scores
Source	Rating
AllMusic	3/5 stars

AllMusic editor Alex Henderson found that like Hathaway's debut album, A Moment "is a mixed bag ranging from the strong to the decent to the routine (depending on who's producing and/or writing a particular song) [...] Overall, this is a slightly weaker effort than Hathaway's debut. One hoped that eventually, she would live up to her promise and deliver a truly outstanding album, one that would become a huge name in R&B."

== Track listing ==
A Moment track listing
No.	Title	Writer(s)	Producer(s)	Length
1.	"Let Me Love You"	Brian Alexander Morgan	Morgan	5:32
2.	"Rise"	Keith Crouch	Crouch	4:43
3.	"Family Affair"	Sylvester Stewart	Martyn Ware	4:06
4.	"These Are the Things (You Do to Me)"	Crouch	Crouch	4:23
5.	"Do You Suppose"	Lori Perry; Raymond Jones; Sami McKinney	Jones; McKinney	5:34
6.	"Better as a Memory"	K.C. Porter; McKinney	Porter; McKinney	4:23
7.	"Bad by Myself"	Chuckii Booker	Booker	4:23
8.	"Lean On Me"	Lalah Hathaway; Crouch	Crouch	4:52
9.	"Separate Ways"	Crouch	Crouch	4:28
10.	"Long After U Have Gone"	Hathaway; David Delhomme	Hathaway; Delhomme	4:33
11.	"I'm Not Over You"	Hathaway; Delhomme; McKinney	Hathaway; Delhomme	4:21
12.	"A Moment"	Hathaway; Delhomme; Andrew Sherman; Craig Glanville	Bread and Butter; Delhomme^{[a]}	2:07
13.	"So They Say" (Hathaway)		Hathaway	3:27
Total length:				56:48

Notes

- ^{^[a]} signifies additional producers

== Charts ==
Chart performance for A Moment
Chart (1994)	Peak position
US Top R&B/Hip-Hop Albums (Billboard)	40
