= Lalah Hathaway (album) =

Studio album by Lalah Hathaway
- Released: June 29, 1990
- Recorded: 1989-1990
- Studios: Ocean Way Recording, M'Bila Studios and Soundcastle (Hollywood, CA); Pacifique Studios (North Hollywood, CA); Lion Share, The Playhouse, Summa Music Group, Westlake Studios, Craigland Studios, Silverlake Studios and Elumba Studios (Los Angeles, CA); Devonshire Sound Studios (Burbank, CA); Aire L.A. Studios (Glendale, CA)
- Genres: R&B
- Length: 45:06
- Label: Virgin
- Producers: Chuckii Booker; Derek Bramble; Craig T. Cooper; Andre Fischer; Gary Taylor; Angela Winbush

Lalah Hathaway chronology
Lalah Hathaway (1990)	A Moment (1994)

Singles from Lalah Hathaway
- 1. "Heaven Knows" Released: June 28, 1990; 2. "Baby Don't Cry" Released: October 24, 1990; 3. "It's Somethin'" Released: March 7, 1991; 4. "I'm Coming Back" Released: June 6, 1991

Lalah Hathaway is the debut studio album by American singer Lalah Hathaway. It was released by Virgin Records on June 29, 1990, in the United States.

== Promotion ==
The album's first single was "Heaven Knows", produced by Derek Bramble. The follow-up single was "Baby Don't Cry", produced by Angela Winbush. The third single was "Somethin'". Virgin also released Night and Day, an EP available only in Japan. The disc featured two versions of the song "Night and Day" as well as two songs taken from the Lalah Hathaway album. Promotional music videos were shot for the singles "Heaven Knows", "Baby Don't Cry", and "Somethin'".

== Critical reception ==
Professional ratings
Review scores
Source	Rating
AllMusic	4/5 stars
The New York Times	(favorable)

AllMusic editor Alex Henderson found that "the material on this CD ranges from excellent to routine, depending on who's writing and/or producing a particular song. Hathaway doesn't always have fantastic material to work with, but when she does, the results are quite memorable."

== Track listing ==
Lalah Hathaway track listing
No.	Title	Writer(s)	Producers	Length
1.	"Somethin'"	David Foster; Brenda Russell	Andre Fischer	3:38
2.	"Heaven Knows"	Derek Bramble	Bramble	5:17
3.	"Baby Don't Cry"	Angela Winbush	Winbush	4:04
4.	"Smile"	Russell Ferrante; Marilyn Scott	Fischer	4:55
5.	"U-Godit Gowin On"	Craig T. Cooper; Deborah Cooper	C. Cooper	3:28
6.	"I'm Coming Back"	Gary Taylor	Taylor; Fischer^{[a]}	5:37
7.	"Stay Home Tonight"	Martin Van Blockson	Fischer	4:16
8.	"I Gotta Move On"	Winbush	Winbush; Fischer^{[a]}	4:46
9.	"Sentimental"	Chuckii Booker	Booker	3:42
10.	"Obvious"	C. Cooper; D.Cooper; Denise Stewart	C. Cooper	5:16
Total length:				45:06

Notes

- ^{^[a]} signifies additional producers

== Personnel ==
- Lalah Hathaway – all vocals (1, 4, 6–10), lead vocals (2, 3, 5), backing vocals (3, 5)
- Randy Kerber – keyboards (1)
- Larry Williams – synthesizers (1, 7)
- Derek Bramble – keyboards (2), bass (2), drum programming (2)
- Monty Seward – keyboards (2)
- Angela Winbush – keyboards (3, 8), synthesizers (3, 8), drum programming (3, 8), backing vocals (3, 8), arrangements (3, 8)
- Jeff Lorber – additional synthesizers (3), additional programming (3, 8), flutes (8), strings (8)
- Russell Ferrante – keyboards (4, 7)
- Craig T. Cooper – all instruments (5, 10), arrangements (5, 10)
- Gary Taylor – keyboards (6), Oberheim DMX programming (6), arrangements (6)
- Marc Hugenberger – synthesizers (6)
- Larry Steelman – synthesizers (8)
- Chuckii Booker – all instruments (9), arrangements (9)
- Dean Parks – guitars (4)
- Michael Thompson – guitars (6)
- Donald Griffin – guitars (7)
- Neil Stubenhaus – bass (1, 7)
- Jimmy Haslip – bass (4)
- Jeff Porcaro – drums (1)
- Will Kennedy – drums (4, 7)
- Luis Conte – percussion (4)
- Marc Russo – saxophone (1, 4, 7)
- Sam Riney – saxophone (8)
- Andre Fischer – arrangements (1, 4, 7), drums (6), percussion (6), additional arrangements (6, 8), additional keyboards (8), additional synthesizers (8), additional drum programming (8)
- Jerry Hey – arrangements (1, 4, 7)
- Jean McClain – backing vocals (2)
- Deborah Cooper – backing vocals (5)
- Natalie Cole – backing vocals (uncredited, 7)

The "Gowin' On" Handclappers (Track 5)

- Antoinette Brown, Robbie Casey, Deborah Cooper, Jai Diamond, Gerald Farwell, Robert "Bullet" Harris, Cat Miller, Kirtland, Maria A. Manning, Kelvin McKisic and Denise Stewart
- For Real (Josina Elder, Phaenicia Grant, Shiro Stokes and Wendi Williams)

== Production ==
- John Brown – executive producer
- Marsha Burns – production coordinator (2)
- Melanie Nissen – art direction
- Tracy Veal – design
- Jean Paul Mann – front cover photography
- David Roth – inside photography
- Celestine Cloutier – wardrobe stylist
- Victor Joseph – wardrobe stylist
- Tara Posey – make-up

Technical

- Dan Hersch – mastering at DigiPrep (Hollywood, California)
- Al Schmitt – engineer (1, 4), mixing (1, 4, 7), recording (7)
- Jeff Balding – engineer (2), mixing (2)
- Mitch Gibson – recording (3)
- Dennis Stefani – recording (3)
- Jeff Lorenzen – mixing (3)
- Robert Biles – engineer (5, 10), mixing (5, 10)
- Craig T. Cooper – engineer (5), mixing (5)
- Jeff Woodruff – engineer (6, 8), mixing (6, 8)
- Rob Seifert – recording (9)
- Craig Burbidge – mixing (9)
- Mike Mancini – additional engineer (2)
- Richard McKernon – additional engineer (4)
- Doug Rider – additional engineer (4)
- Steve Sykes – additional engineer (4)
- Kyle Bess – assistant engineer (2)
- Steve Harrison – assistant engineer (2)
- James Johnson – assistant engineer (2)
- Darren Prindle – assistant engineer (5)
- Anthony Jeffries – assistant engineer (9)
- Mike Scotella – assistant engineer (9)
- Karen Shellenberger – assistant engineer (10)
- Al Singleton – assistant engineer (10)

== Charts ==
=== Weekly charts ===
Weekly chart performance for Lalah Hathaway
Chart (1990)	Peak position
US Billboard 200	191
US Top R&B/Hip-Hop Albums (Billboard)	18

=== Year-end charts ===
Year-end chart performance for Lalah Hathaway
Chart (1990)	Position
US Top R&B/Hip-Hop Albums (Billboard)	99
Chart (1991)	Position
US Top R&B/Hip-Hop Albums (Billboard)	81
