= Self Portrait (Lalah Hathaway album) =

Studio album by Lalah Hathaway
- Released: June 3, 2008
- Length: 57:21
- Label: Stax
- Producers: Kenneth Crouch; Paula Gallitano; Lalah Hathaway; Manuel Hugas; Terrace Martin; Rex Rideout; Wiboud Burkens

Lalah Hathaway chronology
Outrun the Sky (2004)	Self Portrait (2008)	Where It All Begins (2011)

Singles from Self Portrait
- 1. "Let Go" Released: April 21, 2008; 2. "That Was Then" Released: 2008

Self Portrait is the fifth studio album by American singer Lalah Hathaway. It was released by Stax Records on June 3, 2008 in the United States. Chiefly produced by Rex Rideout, it marked her debut with the label and became Hathaway's highest-charting album by then, reaching number six on the US Billboard Top R&B/Hip-Hop Albums, her first top ten entry on that chart.

== Background ==
The title and release date of Self Portrait were announced in Hathaway's official MySpace page in March 2008. The album features production contributions from Rex Rideout as well as Paula Gallitano, Kenneth Crouch, and Terrace Martin. Hathaway also worked with singer-songwriters Sandra St. Victor and singer Rahsaan Patterson on Self Portrait. Commenting on her decision to name the album Self Portrait, Hathaway told Essence in 2008: "This is the first record that I've ever worked on from start to finish including developing the concept, styling, the sequence and selection of the songs, the musicians, the producers, the marketing, the way it sounds – everything. That's why I call it Self-Portrait because it's my fifth album but it feels like my first."

== Promotion ==
Opening track "Let Go," produced by Rex Rideout and co-written by Rahsaan Patterson, was seclected as the album's lead single. Co-produced by Hathaway, it also features Patterson on background vocals. Issued to radio stations on April 21, 2008, it peaked at number 16 on Billboard's Adult R&B Songs chart. The album's second single "That Was Then," co-written by Sandra St. Victor, was released in late 2008. It reached number 32 on the Adult R&B Songs chart.

After the release of Self Portrait, Hathaway went on tour, which began on July 12, 2009 at the Omaha Jazz and Blues Festival, and concluded in Atlanta on September 19, 2009. In January 2009, Hathaway appeared on BETJ in an interview and performing before an audience.

== Critical reception ==
Professional ratings
Review scores
Source	Rating
About.com	3/5 stars
AllMusic	4/5 stars
Daily Express	4/5 stars

AllMusic editor Andy Kellman called Self Portrait "more mellow and unified than 2004's Outrun the Sky." He found that "the album maintains a steady flow, whether the backdrops feature midtempo dance rhythms and horns, deep basslines and finger snaps, or acoustic guitars and glistening keyboards. Nothing is bound to jump out of the speakers and pull you around the room, but there's an unshakable lingering effect with nearly every song. More than anything, the album helps bring back the art of the subtly seductive slow jam, despite the lyrical range, which covers personal issues almost as frequently as relationships."

In his review for SoulTracks, Akim Bryant noted that Hathaway "delivers a satisfying collection of new material intended to further solidify her declaration of empowerment." He fehlt that she "has truly developed into a first rate song stylist, and her velvet-textured voice transcends all of the melodies on Self Portrait. The song selection doesn't necessarily vary wildly in terms of tempo or aura, but Lalah knows exactly who she is and the type of artistry she wants to be remembered for." Billboard wrote: "Instead of standing behind dad Donny's formidable shadow, Lalah Hathaway has resolutely sculpted her own soulful identity. That’s never been more apparent than on her fourth solo album, her most personal – and stunning – project to date [...] Like top-shelf cognac, Hathaway's passionate vocals go down smooth and spread head-to-toe warmth – a fitting symbol for the next generation of Stax soul."

== Track listing ==
Self Portrait track listing
No.	Title	Writer(s)	Producer(s)	Length
1.	"Let Go"	Lalah Hathaway; Rahsaan Patterson; Rex Rideout	Rideout	4:06
2.	"Breathe"	Hathaway; Rideout; Michael Ripoll	Rideout	5:04
3.	"On Your Own"	Hathaway; Patterson; Rideout	Rideout	6:39
4.	"For Always"	Hathaway; Rideout	Rideout	4:23
5.	"That Was Then"	Hathaway; Rideout; Sandra St. Victor	Rideout	5:09
6.	"Learning to Swim"	Hathaway	Paula Gallitano	4:39
7.	"1 Mile" (rap by Andre Edwards)	Hathaway; Edwards; Terrace Martin; Marlon Williams	Martin	4:28
8.	"Little Girl"	Hathaway; Patterson; Rideout; St. Victor	Rideout	4:22
9.	"What Goes Around"	Hathaway; Gallitano	Gallitano	5:39
10.	"Naked Truth" (duet with Rahsaan Patterson)	Hathaway; Kenneth Crouch; St. Victor	Crouch	4:10
11.	"UDO"	Hathaway; Martin; Craig Brockman; Terrin Mosley; Williams	Martin	3:36
12.	"Tragic Inevitability"	Hathaway; Wiboud Burkens; Manuel Hugas	Hathaway; Burkens; Hugas	5:04
Total length:				57:21

iTunes Store bonus track
No.	Title	Length
13.	"Let Go (Video)"

== Charts ==
Chart performance for Self Portrait
Chart (2008)	Peak position
US Billboard 200	63
US Top R&B/Hip-Hop Albums (Billboard)	6

== Release history ==
Release dates and formats for Self Portrait
Region	Date	Format(s)	Label	Ref.
United States	June 3, 2008	CD; digital download	Stax	
