= Outrun the Sky =

Studio album by Lalah Hathaway
- Released: September 28, 2004
- Length: 45:06
- Labels: Mesa; Blue Moon
- Producers: Mike City; David Delhomme; Bud Harner; Lalah Hathaway; Chris Parks; Rex Rideout; Vivian Sessoms

Lalah Hathaway chronology
The Song Lives On (1999)	Outrun the Sky (2004)	Self Portrait (2008)

Singles from Outrun the Sky
- 1. "Forever, for Always, for Love" Released: 2004; 2. "Better and Better" Released: 2004; 3. "How Many Times" Released: 2004

Outrun the Sky is the fourth studio album by American singer Lalah Hathaway. It was released on September 28, 2004, via then Universal-distributed Mesa/Blue Moon Recordings. Her first album in a decade, it peaked at number 34 on the US Billboard Top R&B/Hip-Hop Albums chart.

== Background ==
In 2003, Hathaway signed with Universal-distributed Mesa/Blue Moon Records. In 2004, she released a cover version of Luther Vandross's song "Forever, for Always, for Love" which later appeared on the all-star tribute album Forever, for Always, for Luther (2004) and peaked at number one on Billboard's Adult R&B Songs chart. For her fourth album, Hathaway consulted producers Rex Rideout, Mike City, and David Delhomme as well as Vivian Sessoms and Chris Parks to work with her.

Hathaway took an active hand in the production of Outrun the Sky, writing or co-writing nine songs on the album and producing or co-producing six of them. The album's closing track was originally written in 1993 after Hathaway had moved to Los Angeles. She cited it "the most personal song on the album." The track, "Better And Better" began as a track intended for Eric Benét's album of the same name (2005). His finished track is the same as the one used on this album. Benét's lead and backgrounds were simply removed, and Hathaway's were added.

== Promotion ==
Originally recorded for the all-star tribute album Forever, for Always, for Luther (2004), Outrun the Sky was preceded by Hathaway's rendition of the same titled Luther Vandross song. Also serving as the album lead single, it became her first number one hit on Billboard's Adult R&B Songs chart. Follow-up "Better and Better," produced by Mike City, reached number 21 on the same chart. A third single, "How Many Times," also produced by City, failed to chart.

Following the release of the album's first two singles, Hathaway went on the Daughters of Soul tour, put together by Sandra St. Victor of The Family Stand, co-headlining by St. Victor, Nona Hendryx, Chaka Khan's daughter Indira, Nina Simone's daughter Simone, and Joyce Kennedy of Mother's Finest. On its initial run in 2004, it played four dates at three European jazz festivals, including the Nice Jazz Festival in France, the Pori Jazz Festival in Finland and the Jazzaldia Festival in San Sebastián, Spain.

== Critical reception ==
Professional ratings
Review scores
Source	Rating
AllMusic	3.5/5 stars
Orlando Sentinel	4/5 stars

Outrun the Sky earned generally positive reviews from music critics. AllMusic editor David Jeffries responded that "it's her warm voice, smooth delivery, and allegiance to fad-free R&B that keeps the faithful patiently waiting. Delivering on all counts, Outrun the Sky is a fan's dream and the singer's best showcase since her debut." He called the album a "showcase" on which Hathaway not only does "cover a wider spectrum of tones and moods but she also producers and writes most of the highlights of the album." Jim Abbott of the Orlando Sentinel wrote "Outrun the Sky is worth the wait for fans of old-school singing without the self-indulgent histrionics that American Idol contestants confuse with emotion. Although these 13 songs lack the distinctive punch needed to rival Alicia Keys — the gold standard for modern R&B; — the album is filled with subtle charm."

Mark Anthony Neal from PopMatters found that Outrun the Sky was in the spirit of Hathaway's previous album The Song Lives On but "finds its place. There are obvious attempts to garner some support from urban radio [...] but Hathaway'’s strength throughout her career has been the ballad. No longer feeling the need to compete with some of her R&B peers, Hathaway makes the transition here to song stylist — think Nancy Wilson — adding a level of depth by writing many of the project's songs." SoulTracks critic Chris Rizik noted that "while her 1999 disc with Joe Sample, The Song Lives On, was a career album that couldn't be replicated, with Outrun the Sky Lalah Hathaway has created a classy and welcome addition to her discography that should be gobbled up by her patient, devoted fans."

== Track listing ==
Outrun the Sky track listing
No.	Title	Writer(s)	Producer(s)	Length
1.	"How Many Times"	Lalah Hathaway; Michael Flowers	Mike City	3:40
2.	"Back Then"	Hathaway; Chris Parks; Vivian Sessoms	Parks; Sessoms	4:50
3.	"Your Favorite Song"	Flowers	City	4:07
4.	"Forever, for Always, for Love"	Luther Vandross	Rex Rideout; Bud Harner	5:52
5.	"Better and Better"	Flowers	City	4:04
6.	"Outrun the Sky"	Hathaway	Hathaway	3:06
7.	"If U Ever"	Hathaway; David Delhomme	Hathaway; Delhomme	3:48
8.	"In the End"	Parks; Sessoms	Parks; Sessoms	4:15
9.	"Admit It"	Hathaway; Parks; Sessoms; Wondress Hutchinson	Parks; Sessoms; Hathaway^{[a]}	5:34
10.	"Stronger"	Hathaway; Delhomme	Hathaway; Delhomme	5:47
11.	"We Were 2"	Hathaway; Delhomme	Hathaway; Delhomme	8:10
12.	"More"	Hathaway; Delhomme	Hathaway; Delhomme	5:11
13.	"Boston"	Hathaway	Hathaway	5:37
Total length:				45:06

Notes

- ^{^[a]} signifies additional producers

== Personnel ==
- Lalah Hathaway – vocals, backing vocals (2, 7, 8)
- Mike City – other instruments (1, 3), all instruments (5)
- Chris Parks – keyboards (2, 8, 9), guitars (2, 6–13), bass (2, 6–13), drum programming (2, 8, 9)
- Rex Rideout – keyboards (4), programming (4)
- Sundra Manning – Hammond B3 organ (4)
- Tim Carmon – Rhodes piano (6, 7, 10–13), organ (6, 7, 10–13), Hammond B3 organ (9)
- David Delhomme – keyboards (6, 7, 10–13), guitars (6, 7, 10–13)
- Erick Walls – guitars (1, 3)
- Ray Fuller – guitars (4)
- John "Jubu" Smith – guitars (6, 7, 10–13), additional guitars (9)
- Sekou Bunch – bass (4)
- Doug Livingston – pedal steel guitar (6, 10)
- Michael White – drums (4)
- Poogie Bell – drums (6, 7, 10–13)
- Lenny Castro – percussion (4)
- Ricky Rodriguez – percussion (6, 7, 10–13)
- Brandon Fields – saxophones (4)
- Nick Lane – trombone (3), horn arrangements (4)
- Lee Thornburg – trumpet (4)
- Vivian Sessoms – backing vocals (2, 8)
- Kenya Hathaway – backing vocals (7, 10)
- Jenny Douglas-McRae – backing vocals (8)

=== Production ===
- George Nauful – executive producer, A&R direction
- Raymond A. Shields II – executive producer, management
- Pat Shields – A&R coordination, marketing
- Jack Frisch – art direction, design
- Kate Garner – photography
- Katrina Porter – hair stylist
- Kim Todd – make-up
- Marie Flemings – clothing

Technical

- Steve Hall – mastering at Future Disc (Hollywood, California)
- Jim Morgan – recording (1)
- Dave Pensado – mixing (1, 3, 5)
- Chris Parks – recording (2, 8, 9)
- Craig Burbidge – mixing (2, 6–13)
- Franny Graham – recording (3, 5)
- Steve Sykes – recording (4)
- Ray Bardani – mixing (4)
- Anthony Jeffries – recording (6, 7, 10–13)
- Ethan Wiloughby – mix assistant (1)
- Jason Merritt – mix assistant (4)
- Mark Green – additional engineer (4)
- Rex Rideout – additional engineer (4)

== Charts ==
Chart performance for Outrun the Sky
Chart (2004)	Peak position
US Top R&B/Hip-Hop Albums (Billboard)	34

== Release history ==
Release dates and formats for Outrun the Sky
Region	Date	Format(s)	Label	Ref.
United States	September 28, 2004	CD; digital download	Mesa; Blue Moon	
