= Interpretations: Celebrating the Music of Earth, Wind & Fire =

Interpretations: Celebrating the Music of Earth, Wind and Fire

Compilation album by Various Artists
- Released: March 27, 2007
- Genre: R&B
- Label: Stax Records
- Producer: Maurice White

Professional ratings
Review scores
Source	Rating
Allmusic	3/5 stars
PopMatters	(8/10)
People	(favorable)
Atlanta Journal-Constitution	(A−)
Philadelphia Inquirer	(A−)
USA Today	(favorable)

Interpretations: Celebrating the Music of Earth, Wind and Fire is a tribute album to the R&B band Earth, Wind & Fire produced by Maurice White and released in March 2007 on Stax Records. The album reached No. 28 on the Billboard Top R&B/Hip-Hop Albums chart.

== Overview ==
The album was executively produced by Maurice White and was the first to be released on the revived Stax Records label.

== Critical reception ==
Mike Joseph of PopMatters gave an 8 out of 10 score, scribing "The fact that Interpretations: Celebrating the Music of Earth, Wind & Fire is as solid as it is proves that there are exceptions to every rule. On this compact, efficient compilation (which also serves as the relaunch of the legendary soul label Stax), the most successful soul band of the ’70s is given their due by an impressive collection of today’s top R&B musicians (and one of their formidable peers)." Jason Christopher Monger of AllMusic gave 3 out of 5 stars exclaiming "Released on Stax, this better than average tribute album works pretty well". Jonathan Takiff of the Philadelphia Inquirer gave an A−, noting Interpretations "loads up the icons' slow burns and brassy midtempo grooves with some sharp turns." Sonia Murray of the Atlanta Journal Constitution also gave an A−, calling the album "one of the best R&B releases this year."

As well Dwele's cover of "That's the Way of the World" and Meshell Ndegeocello's rendition of "Fantasy" were both Grammy nominated for Best Urban/Alternative Performance.

== Singles ==
Kirk Franklin's cover of "September" reached No. 17 on the Billboard Adult R&B Songs chart and No. 26 on the Hot Gospel Songs chart.

== Track listing ==
No.	Title	Writer(s)	Performer	Length
1.	"Shining Star"	Philip Bailey, Larry Dunn, Maurice White	Chaka Khan	4:01
2.	"Be Ever Wonderful"	Larry Dunn, Maurice White	Angie Stone	4:04
3.	"September"	Al McKay, Maurice White, Allee Willis	Kirk Franklin	3:56
4.	"Devotion"	Philip Bailey, Maurice White	Ledisi	4:56
5.	"Can't Hide Love"	Skip Scarborough	The Randy Watson Experience	5:18
6.	"Love's Holiday"	Skip Scarborough, Maurice White	Lalah Hathaway	4:02
7.	"That's the Way of the World"	Charles Stepney, Maurice White, Verdine White	Dwele	5:16
8.	"After the Love Has Gone"	Bill Champlin, David Foster, Jay Graydon	Mint Condition	4:39
9.	"Reasons"	Philip Bailey, Charles Stepney, Maurice White	Musiq Soulchild	4:51
10.	"Fantasy"	Eduardo del Barrio, Maurice White, Verdine White	Me'Shell Ndegéocello	3:41

== Accolades ==
Year	Publication	Country	Accolade	Rank
2007	Atlanta Journal-Constitution	U.S.	Your 2007 Top CDs	*
