= The Song Lives On =

Studio album by Lalah Hathaway & Joe Sample
- Released: April 20, 1999
- Studios: Ocean Way Recording (Hollywood, California)
- Genres: Jazz; R&B
- Length: 56:35
- Label: GRP
- Producers: Joe Sample; Bill Schnee

Lalah Hathaway chronology
A Moment (1994)	The Song Lives On (1999)	Outrun the Sky (2004)

Joe Sample chronology
Sample This (1997)	The Song Lives On (1999)	The Pecan Tree (2002)

The Song Lives On is a collaborative studio album by former Jazz Crusaders member Joe Sample and R&B singer Lalah Hathaway. It was released by GRP Records on April 20, 1999, in the United States.

== Background ==
In 1998, Lalah Hathaway and Joe Sample began working on their collaborative album. Hathaway sang most of the lead vocals on such songs as lead single "When Your Life Was Low" and a cover of The Crusaders' hit "Street Life," while Sample supplied the instruments like piano. The second single was the covered song "Fever".

== Critical response ==
Professional ratings
Review scores
Source	Rating
AllMusic	4/5 stars

The album received a favorable review from AllMusic editor Jonathan Widran. He stated that "the daughter of the popular late R&B singer Donny, husky voiced Lalah Hathaway is the perfect foil for Joe Sample's compelling notion that The Song Lives On. Finding a happy medium between the graceful straight-ahead jazz trio vibe of his Invitation album and the plucky pop energy of Spellbound, Sample provides Hathaway on seven of the 11 tunes with a showcase for her sultry approach."

== Commercial performance ==
The Song Lives On peaked at number two on the US Billboard Top Jazz Albums. In response to the album's commercial success, Hathaway and Sample were honored with Billboard/BET On Jazz Award for "Mainstream Jazz Album."

== Track listing ==
All tracks produced by Joe Sample and Bill Schnee.

The Song Lives On track listing
No.	Title	Writer(s)	Length
1.	"The Song Lives On"	Sample	5:09
2.	"Fever"	Cooley, Davenport	5:40
3.	"Come Along with Me"	Gimbel, Sample	5:12
4.	"Living in Blue"	Sample	4:45
5.	"Street Life"	Jennings, Sample	5:49
6.	"When Your Life Was Low"	Jennings, Sample	5:43
7.	"One Day I'll Fly Away"	Jennings, Sample	5:40
8.	"When the World Turns Blue"	Jennings, Sample	4:29
9.	"For All We Know"	Coots, Lewis	5:13
10.	"Bitter Sweet"	Sample	3:58
11.	"A Long Way from Home"	Sample	4:57
Total length:			56:35

Japanese bonus track
No.	Title	Length
12.	"It's a Sin to Tell a Lie"	4:57
Total length:		61:32

== Personnel ==
- Lalah Hathaway – vocals, vocal arrangement
- Joe Sample – acoustic piano, Rhodes piano, instrumental arrangements
- David Delhomme – synthesizers (1, 3–9), organ (11)
- Michael Thompson – electric guitars (1–7)
- Jay Anderson – bass
- Walfredo Reyes Jr. – drums
- Lenny Castro – percussion (1–8, 10)
- Kirk Whalum – saxophone (1, 2, 6, 7)

=== Production ===
- Joe Sample – producer
- Bill Schnee – producer, recording, mixing
- Koji Egawa – mix assistant
- Alan Sanderson – recording assistant
- Doug Sax – mastering at The Mastering Lab (Hollywood, California)
- John Cabalka – art direction
- Steven Silverstein – photography
- Patrick Rains – management for Joe Sample
- Raymond A. Shields II – management for Lalah Hathaway

== Charts ==
Chart performance for The Song Lives On
Chart (1999)	Peak position
US Billboard 200	196
US Top Jazz Albums (Billboard)	2
US Top R&B/Hip-Hop Albums (Billboard)	53
