= Honestly (Lalah Hathaway album) =

Studio album by Lalah Hathaway
- Released: October 20, 2017
- Length: 28:44
- Label: Hathaway Entertainment
- Producer: Tiffany Gouché; Lalah Hathaway

Lalah Hathaway chronology
Lalah Hathaway Live (2015)	Honestly (2017)	Vantablack (2024)

Singles from Honestly
- 1. "I Can't Wait" Released: July 14, 2017; 2. "Honestly" Released: 2017; 3. "Call On Me" Released: September 14, 2018

Honestly is the seventh studio album by American singer Lalah Hathaway. It was released on October 20, 2017 through her own label, Hathaway Entertainment. The album, produced entirely by Tiffany Gouche and Hathaway, earned two Grammy Award nominations in 2019, with "Y O Y" being nominated for Best R&B Performance and Honestly receiving a Best R&B Album nomination. A deluxe edition of the album was released digitally on June 27, 2018.

== Reception ==
In a Vibe magazine interview, Desire Thompson described Honestly this way: "Even after making history, the singer would rather test the limits of her resounding vocals than float comfortably on one sound. While listening to cuts from her forthcoming album honestly, there's an electronic-bluesy presence, a stark difference from her 2015 project. There's also bold stances on love throughout tracks like "change ya life" and "what you need," paired with joyous cuts "i can't wait" and the revolutionary Lecrae-assisted jam, "don't give up."

SoulTracks critic L. Michael Gipson found that "the project will read for some as yet another vain attempt by a veteran artist to "go young" and be "on trend." These are expectations no Lalah Hathaway devotee has ever had of this singular mahogany voice, whose claim to fame came through the doors of purist jazz, fusion, and classic soul, and that’s without her famous pedigree. But, in a seeming attempt to reach for those a generation after those who grew up as young adults with Hathaway, Honestly is a project riddled with overused production techniques, trap and other radio urban pop sounds, and gratuitously coarse language."

== Chart performance ==
Honstely debuted and peakead at number nine on the US Billboard Independent Albums chart in the week of November 21, 2015.

== Track listing ==
All tracks produced by Tiffany Gouché and Lalah Hathaway.

Honestly track listing
No.	Title	Writer(s)	Length
1.	"Honestly"	Lalah Hathaway; Tiffany Gouché	2:42
2.	"Don't Give Up"	Hathaway; Gouché; Lecrae Moore	3:30
3.	"Change Ya Life"	Hathaway; Gouché	2:59
4.	"What U Need"	Hathaway; Gouché	3:30
5.	"Call on Me"	Hathaway; Gouché	3:45
6.	"Won't Let It Go"	Hathaway; Gouché	3:37
7.	"Storm"	Hathaway; Gouché	1:06
8.	"Y O Y"	Hathaway; Gouché	3:50
9.	"I Can't Wait"	Hathaway; Gouché	4:01
Total length:			28:48

Deluxe edition
No.	Title	Length
1.	"Honestly"	2:41
2.	"Don't Give Up" (featuring Lecrae)	3:30
3.	"Change Ya Life"	2:59
4.	"What U Need" (featuring Tiffany Gouché)	3:30
5.	"Call on Me" (remix/extended version featuring Redman)	4:08
6.	"Won't Let It Go"	3:37
7.	"Storm"	1:06
8.	"Y O Y"	3:49
9.	"I Can't Wait"	3:49
10.	"I Can't Wait" (Teddy Riley Remix)	3:59
11.	"I Can't Wait" (Robert Glasper Remix)	3:30
12.	"I Can't Wait" (L's Remix)	3:50
13.	"I Can't Wait" (The Twilite Tone Remix)	6:24
14.	"Change Ya Life" (acoustic)	2:56
15.	"Call on Me"	3:44

Note

- All track titles are stylized in lowercase.

== Charts ==
Chart performance for Honestly
Chart (2017)	Peak position
US Independent Albums (Billboard)	9

== Release history ==
Release dates and formats for Honestly
Region	Date	Edition(s)	Format(s)	Label	Ref.
Various	October 20, 2017	Standard	CD; digital download	Hathaway Entertainment	
Various	October 20, 2017	Deluxe	digital download	Hathaway Entertainment	
