= Vesta Williams =

American contemporary R&B singer (1957–2011)

Background information
- Born: Mary Vesta Williams; December 1, 1957; Coshocton, Ohio, U.S.
- Died: September 22, 2011 (aged 53) El Segundo, California, U.S.
- Genres: R&B; soul; funk; urban contemporary
- Occupations: Singer–songwriter; actress
- Instrument: Vocals
- Years active: 1985–2011
- Labels: A&M; PolyGram

Mary Vesta Williams (December 1, 1957 – September 22, 2011) was an American singer-songwriter, who performed across genres such as soul, funk, R&B, Quiet storm, jazz soul and Urban Contemporary. Originally credited as Vesta Williams, she was simply known as Vesta beginning in the 1990s. She was known for her four–octave vocal range. She once sang "The Star-Spangled Banner" for the Los Angeles Lakers game opener using all four of those octaves.

Although Williams never had any albums certified gold nor any top 40 hits on the Billboard Hot 100, she scored six top 10 hits on the United States Billboard R&B chart from the mid–1980s to the early–1990s that included "Once Bitten, Twice Shy" (1986), "Sweet Sweet Love" (1988), "Special" (1991), and her 1989 single and signature song, "Congratulations".

== Biography ==
Born in Coshocton, Ohio, United States, Williams' father was a disc jockey. Her family moved from Ohio to Los Angeles in the 1960s. While there, Williams and her three sisters, Margaret, Marte and Marlena, appeared on the television show Jack and Jill as "The Williams Sisters". Later, she returned to Ohio but decided to go back to Los Angeles in order to launch a solo career. Former Fifth Dimension member Ron Townson put Williams in his band Wild Honey.

Following that stint, Williams found work as a backup singer, working with artists such as Chaka Khan, Gladys Knight, Sting, Stephanie Mills, Anita Baker and Gordon Lightfoot. Williams sang on the original version of Joe Sample's "The Survivor", and met producer David Crawford while working with his group Klique. After doing session work, she landed a recording contract with A&M Records and her debut album, Vesta, was released in 1986. The album featured her first top 10 R&B hit "Once Bitten, Twice Shy", which became her only UK hit and performed modestly on the US R&B charts.

Her 1988 release, Vesta 4 U, produced the top 10 R&B hits "Sweet Sweet Love", "4 U", and "Congratulations", with the latter peaking at #55 on the Hot 100 chart and #5 on the R&B chart. "Congratulations" was Vesta's only single to enter the Hot 100 chart. Her only album to appear on the US Billboard 200, peaking at No. 131. There were persistent rumors that the song was inspired by the dissolution of her long-time relationship with Bruce Willis and that Demi Moore was directly responsible for ending it. In 1991, Williams released her third album entitled Special, with the title track as a single. "Special" became her highest-charting song on the R&B chart at #2, but sales of the album were less than that of Vesta 4 U. Her next album, 1993's Everything-N-More, produced only a minor R&B hit, "Always".

In 1989, Polygram Records purchased A&M Records. Williams' 1998 album Relationships was released under the Polygram name, and it became a modest seller, appearing on the R&B charts. Following the release of Relationships, A&M/Polygram did not renew her contract. Williams continued to work as a session singer, landing spots on albums by such artists as Phil Perry, Howard Hewett, and George Duke. She "[sang] jingles for television commercials for companies like McDonald's, Coca-Cola and Honda." That same year, she performed the opening theme to the ABC miniseries, The Women of Brewster Place.

Williams portrayed a saloon singer in the 1993 film Posse, directed by Mario Van Peebles. During this time period she had a R&B minor hit "Always" in 1993. Williams was on the television series Sister, Sister. Her singing voice is featured in the theme song of UPN's Malcolm & Eddie starring Malcolm-Jamal Warner and Eddie Griffin.

In 2000, Polygram released a compilation album, featuring songs from Williams and former A&M artist CeCe Peniston. In 2007, Williams released an album of R&B songs on Shanachie Records entitled Distant Lover. Produced by Chris "Big Dog" Davis, Distant Lover was a cover album featuring songs originally recorded by Bill Withers, Stevie Wonder, Smokey Robinson, Marvin Gaye, Sade, and Deniece Williams. Her last recording was the song "Dedicated," released on 7 December 2010 on Stimuli Music.

By 2002, Williams had become a radio personality, and was co-hosting a morning show on KRNB in Dallas/Fort Worth. In recent years, Williams had lost 100 pounds, going from size 26 to size 6.

Her final performance occurred on September 17, 2011, in Portsmouth, Virginia, at the Autumn Jazz Explosion, just five days before her death. Williams was taping an episode of TV One's Unsung at the time of her death; it aired on January 2, 2012.

== Death ==
On September 22, 2011, Williams was found dead in a hotel room in El Segundo, California, a suburb of Los Angeles. According to the Los Angeles County Coroner's Office, she was found dead at 6:15 p.m. (PDT), A spokesperson for the coroner's office stated that the autopsy did not say the cause of death. In late December 2011, the family released this statement through singer/producer Norwood Young, reporting her official cause of death: "Following three months of intensive coroner's autopsy and toxicology research, it has been definitively determined that the cause of death for our beloved Vesta was 'natural death' from 'hypertensive heart disease,'" adding: "An enlarged heart can remain undetected for many years."

Vesta Williams was laid to rest at Forest Lawn Memorial Park (Hollywood Hills) on October 4, 2011, following a memorial service at West Angeles Church of God in Christ in Los Angeles, California. A private reception was held following the interment.

She is survived by her mother, daughter, three sisters and three grandchildren.

== Discography ==
=== Studio albums ===
Year	Title	Peak chart positions				Record label
Year	Title	US	US R&B	US Heat	NLD	Record label
1986	Vesta	—	43	—	67	A&M
1988	Vesta 4 U	131	26	—	—	A&M
1991	Special	—	15	—	—	A&M
1993	Everything-N-More	—	65	—	—	A&M
1998	Relationships	—	55	26	—	i.e. music
2007	Distant Lover	—	—	—	—	Shanachie
2013	Seven	—	—	—	—	Bronx Bridge
"—" denotes a recording that did not chart or was not released in that territory.

=== Compilation albums ===
- Winning Combinations (with CeCe Peniston) (2000, A&M/Universal)

=== Singles ===
Year	Title	Peak chart positions							
Year	Title	US	US R&B	US A. R&B	US Dan	IRE	NLD	NZ	UK
1986	"Once Bitten Twice Shy"	—	8	—	—	21	20	42	14
1987	"Something About You"	—	46	—	21	—	—	—	—
1987	"Don't Blow a Good Thing"	—	17	—	5	—	—	—	89
1987	"Suddenly It's Magic"	—	—	—	—	—	—	—	88
1987	"You Make Me Want To (Love Again)"	—	90	—	—	—	—	—	—
1988	"Sweet, Sweet Love"	—	4	—	—	—	—	—	—
1989	"4 U"	—	9	—	—	—	—	—	—
1989	"Congratulations"	55	5	—	—	—	—	—	—
1989	"How You Feel"	—	70	—	—	—	—	—	—
1990	"I'll Be Good to You" (with Najee)	—	9	—	—	—	—	—	—
1991	"Special"	—	2	—	—	—	—	—	—
1991	"Do Ya"	—	43	—	—	—	—	—	87
1993	"Always"	—	44	27	—	—	—	—	—
1998	"You Still Do It"	—	—	31	—	—	—	—	—
1998	"Somebody for Me"	—	—	9	—	—	—	—	—
2010	"Dedicated"	—	—	—	—	—	—	—	—
2013	"Better Days"	—	—	35	—	—	—	—	—
"—" denotes a recording that did not chart or was not released in that territory.

=== Music videos ===
- "Once Bitten Twice Shy" (1986)
- "Something About You" (1987)
- "Don't Blow a Good Thing" (1987)
- "Sweet Sweet Love" (1988)
- "4 U" (1989)
- "Congratulations" (1989)
- "How You Feel" (1989)
- "Special" (1991)
- "Do Ya" (1991)
- "Always" (1993)
- "Somebody for Me" (1998)
- "Dedicated" (2010)

== See also ==
- A&M
