= Vesta (album) =

Studio album by Vesta Williams
- Released: December 15, 1986
- Genres: R&B, Pop
- Length: 41:40
- Label: A&M Records
- Producers: Bryan Loren, Billy Valentine, Jeremy Lubbock, David Crawford, John McClain (Exe. Producer)

Vesta Williams chronology
Vesta (1986)	Vesta 4 U (1988)

Professional ratings
Review scores
Source	Rating
AllMusic	3/5 stars

Vesta is the debut studio album by American R&B singer Vesta Williams, released on December 15, 1986 on A&M Records.

== Commercial performance ==
The album was a minor hit reaching 43 on Billboard's Top R&B Albums chart. The album scored two R&B hit songs, the lead single "Once Bitten, Twice Shy" peaking to number 9 on R&B singles and top 20 on Dutch and UK singles chart. "Don't Blow a Good Thing" reaching number 17, Williams also scored her first big dance hit as the single reached the top five on Billboard's Hot Dance Club Play chart. Overall sales of the album are unknown, it was reported by Billboard (magazine) to have sold only 420,000 between 1986 and 1987 though it endured on the Billboard R&B Album chart for over a year.

== Track listing ==
Side one
No.	Title	Writer(s)	Length
1.	"Something About You"	Bryan Loren	4:11
2.	"Sweet Thang"	Bryan Loren	5:08
3.	"Don't Blow a Good Thing"	Bryan Loren	4:35
4.	"Get Out of My Life"	Bryan Loren, Tami Meggett	5:16
5.	"I Can Make Your Dreams Come True"	Bryan Loren	3:41

Side two
No.	Title	Writer(s)	Length
6.	"My Heart Is Yours"	Bryan Loren, Billy Valentine	5:27
7.	"You Make Me Want To (Love Again)"	Leon Ware, Billy Valentine	4:58
8.	"It's You"	Leon Ware	3:50
9.	"Don't Let Me Down"	Vesta Williams, Louis Russell	4:12
10.	"Once Bitten Twice Shy"	Vesta Williams, Dean Gant	4:03
11.	"I'm Coming Back"	Gary Taylor	4:47

European release
No.	Title	Writer(s)	Length
1.	"Something About You"	Bryan Loren	4:11
2.	"Sweet Thang"	Bryan Loren	5:08
3.	"Don't Blow a Good Thing"	Bryan Loren	4:35
4.	"Get Out of My Life"	Bryan Loren, Tami Meggett	5:16
5.	"I Can Make Your Dreams Come True"	Bryan Loren	3:41
6.	"Suddenly It's Magic"	Amy La Television, Willie Wilcox	5:04
7.	"My Heart Is Yours"	Bryan Loren, Billy Valentine	5:27
8.	"You Make Me Want To (Love Again)"	Leon Ware, Billy Valentine	4:58
9.	"It's You"	Leon Ware	3:50
10.	"Don't Let Me Down"	Vesta Williams, Louis Russell	4:12
11.	"Once Bitten Twice Shy"	Vesta Williams, Dean Gant	4:03

- "I'm Coming Back" is a bonus track only available on cassette and CD.

== Charts ==
Chart (1986)	Peak position
U.S. Billboard R&B/Hip-Hop Albums	43
