= Vantablack (album) =

Studio album by Lalah Hathaway
- Released: June 14, 2024
- Genre: R&B
- Length: 54:43
- Labels: Hathaway Entertainment; SoNo Recording Group
- Producers: Lalah Hathaway; Phil Beaudreau; Eric Dawkins; Warryn Campbell; Ariza

Lalah Hathaway chronology
Honestly (2017)	Vantablack (2024)	Made in Chicago (2026)

Vantablack (stylized in all caps) is the eighth studio album by Lalah Hathaway. The album earned a Grammy nomination in the category of Best R&B Album.

== Critical reception ==
Professional ratings
Review scores
Source	Rating
AllMusic	4/5 stars

Andy Kellman of AllMusic took note of "Like she took her father and Roberta Flack's "Be Real Black for Me" to heart and then some, Lalah Hathaway titled her eighth solo album after the darkest known pigment and poured the same warm and loving sentiments into the music. Purists who didn't appreciate the bold left turn the singer took with Honestly might be hesitant as they approach this follow-up with four guest MCs and another explicit tag. To the contrary, VANTABLACK, produced by Hathaway with Phil Beaudreau, Ariza, Warryn Campbell and Eric Dawkins rotating at the controls, is closer in sound to Where It All Begins, given that the stylistic descriptors for all of the songs would have to include soul with preceding modifiers such as modern, throwback, hip-hop, folk, and pop.

== Track listing ==
No.	Title	Writer(s)	Length
1.	"BLACK. (feat. Rapsody & Common)"	Phil Beaudreau, Marlanna Evans, Lalah Hathaway, Lonnie Lynn	02:37
2.	"No Lie (feat. Michael McDonald)"	Phil Beaudreau, Lalah Hathaway	04:29
3.	"Mood for You (feat. MC Lyte)"	Warryn Campbell, Affion Crockett, Eric Dawkins, Lalah Hathaway, Lana Moorer, Juan Winans	03:55
4.	"You Don't Know (feat. Phonte)"	BeMyFiasco, Phil Beaudreau, Phonte Coleman, Lalah Hathaway	02:19
5.	"Vantablack"	Juan Andres Carreno Ariza, Lalah Hathaway	02:37
6.	"Returning"	Juan Andres Carreno Ariza, Lalah Hathaway	04:54
7.	"So in Love"	Phil Beaudreau, Lalah Hathaway	04:06
8.	"I AM"	Juan Andres Carreno Ariza, Nicole Cohen, Lalah Hathaway	02:56
9.	"The Machine"	Juan Andres Carreno Ariza, Lalah Hathaway	02:43
10.	"Myth of Being"	Juan Andres Carreno Ariza, Nicole Cohen, Lalah Hathaway	03:20
11.	"Higher"	Phil Beaudreau, Lalah Hathaway, Stephanie Thom	03:47
12.	"The Energy"	Juan Andres Carreno Ariza, Nicole Cohen, Lalah Hathaway	03:40
13.	"#BITMFW"	Phil Beaudreau, Lalah Hathaway	02:55
14.	"Clearly"	Phil Beaudreau, Lalah Hathaway	04:18
15.	"Lower (feat. Gerald Albright)"	Gerald Albright, Phil Beaudreau, Lalah Hathaway	01:55
16.	"Tunnels (feat. WILLOW)"	Phil Beaudreau, Lalah Hathaway, Willow Smith	04:12
Total length:			54:43
