= Lalah Hathaway =

American singer (born 1968)

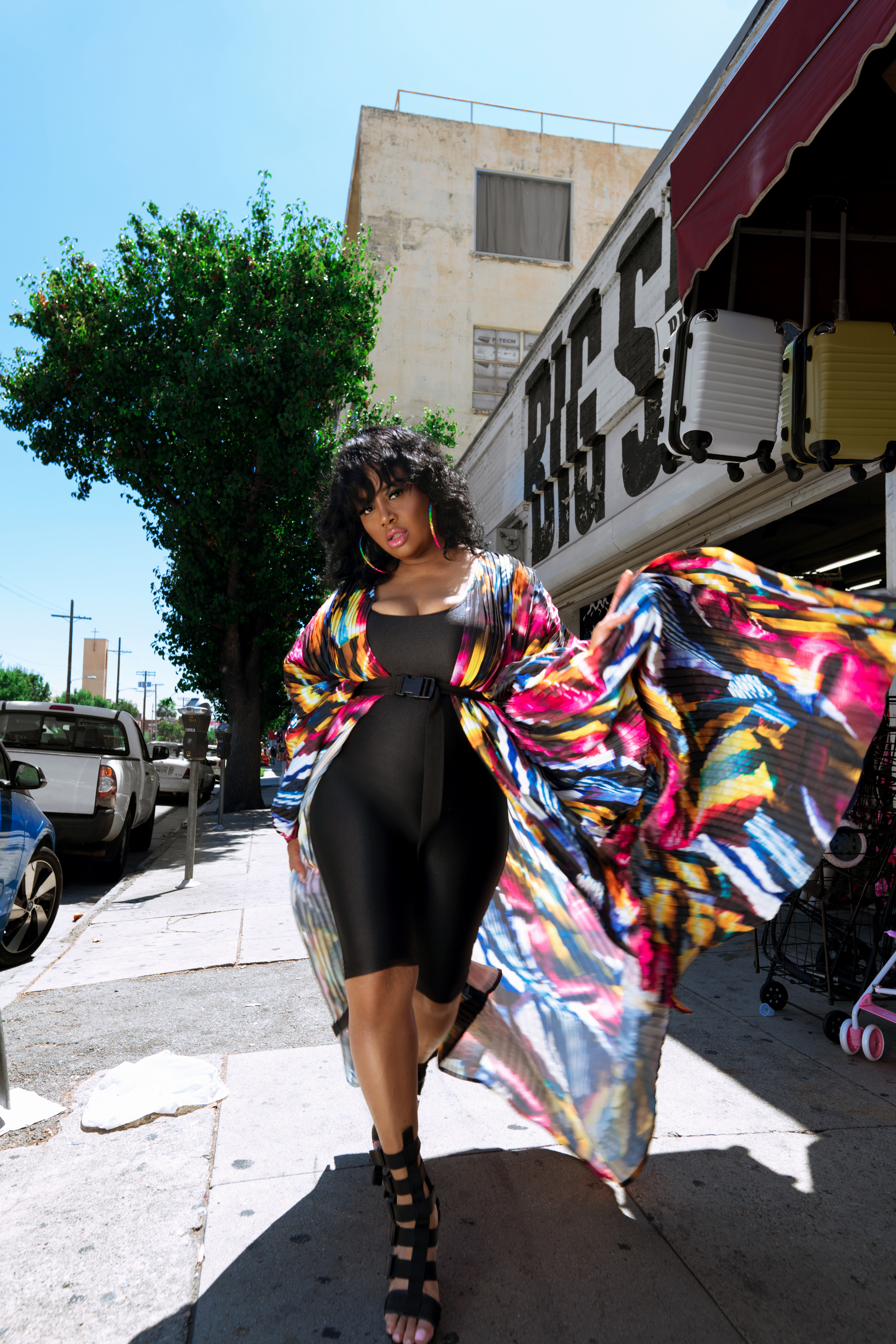
- Hathaway in 2021

Background information
- Born: Eulaulah Donyll Hathaway; December 16, 1968 (age 57); Chicago, Illinois, U.S.
- Genres: R&B; jazz; neo soul; gospel
- Occupations: Singer; songwriter; music producer
- Instruments: Vocals; keyboards
- Years active: 1987–present
- Labels: Caroline; E1; Stax; Sanctuary; Virgin; SoNo Recording Group
- Website: lalahhathaway.com

Eulaulah Donyll "Lalah" Hathaway (born December 16, 1968) is an American singer-songwriter and music producer. Credited as the "First Daughter of Soul", she is the first-born daughter of musician and soul singer Donny Hathaway.

She rose to fame in the 1990s with the release of her debut self-titled album, Lalah Hathaway (1990). The album's lead single "Heaven Knows" peaked in the top-five on the US Billboard Hot R&B/Hip-Hop Songs chart. Her follow-up album A Moment (1994) failed to make a commercial impact and ultimately released Hathaway from her recording contract with Virgin Records. In April 1999, she briefly re-emerged with her third album The Song Lives On, a collaborative album with musician Joe Sample. After another hiatus, Hathaway released her fourth album Outrun the Sky (2004). The album's lead single "Forever, for Always, for Love" peaked at number one on the US Adult R&B Songs chart. She later released two albums: Self Portrait (2008) and Where It All Begins (2011) on Stax Records.

In 2014, Hathaway's song "Something", featured on Snarky Puppy's album Family Dinner – Volume 1 (2013), won a Grammy Award for Best R&B Performance at the 56th Annual Grammy Awards. Her song "Jesus Children" secured a Grammy Award for Best Traditional R&B Performance at the 57th Annual Grammy Awards in 2015. In October 2015, she released a live album. The album spawn a cover version of Anita Baker's song "Angel", which became Hathaway's second number-one song on the US Adult R&B Songs chart. The success of the project garnered three Grammy Awards; including a Grammy Award for Best R&B Album. She has since released two albums Honestly (2017) and Vantablack (2024) on her independent label Hathaway Entertainment.

Hathaway received an honorary doctorate from Berklee College of Music in 2022.

== Early life ==
Eulaulah Donyll Hathaway was born on December 16, 1968, in Chicago, Illinois, to Eulaulah Hathaway (née Vann), a classically trained vocalist and session singer, and Donny Hathaway, a musician and soul singer. Lalah's younger sister, Kenya Hathaway, is also a singer. She also has a half-sister named Donnita Hathaway. Hathaway's father Donny Hathaway died when she was ten years old. Lalah attended the American Conservatory of Music where she learned piano. She wrote her first songs while attending Chicago Academy for the Arts. She later enrolled in Berklee College of Music.

== Career ==
=== 1987–1995: Career beginnings and Virgin Records ===
In 1987, Hathaway released her debut single "Inside the Beat" on Allegiance Records. She released her self-titled first album in June 1990, on Virgin Records. The album peaked at number 191 on the U.S. Billboard 200 and number 18 on the US R&B Albums chart. The album's first two singles "Heaven Knows" and "Baby Don't Cry" peaked in the top twenty on the US Hot R&B Singles chart. Despite positive reviews from music critics and performances on American musical variety television shows Showtime at the Apollo and Soul Train, the album failed to become a commercial success. In March 1991, Hathaway recorded a song "Night and Day" for a commercial by Japanese cigarette company Mild Seven. The song was exclusively released in Japan as a single without Hathaway's consent. In July 1991, Hathaway released a cover version of Sly and the Family Stone's song "Family Affair" on British Electric Foundation's album Music of Quality and Distinction Volume 2. The song peaked at number thirty-seven on the UK Singles Chart. In 1992, Hathaway appeared as a featured vocalist on American jazz saxophonist Grover Washington Jr.'s album Next Exit. The single "Love Like This", which featured Hathaway, peaked at number thirty-one on the Hot R&B Singles chart.

In May 1994, she released her second album A Moment, which only peaked at number forty on the US Top R&B Albums chart. The album's lead single "Let Me Love You" reached number thirty-seven on the Hot R&B Singles chart. After the album's second single "Separate Ways" failed the chart, Hathway was dropped from Virgin Records.

=== 1996–2005: GRP Records and The Song Lives On ===
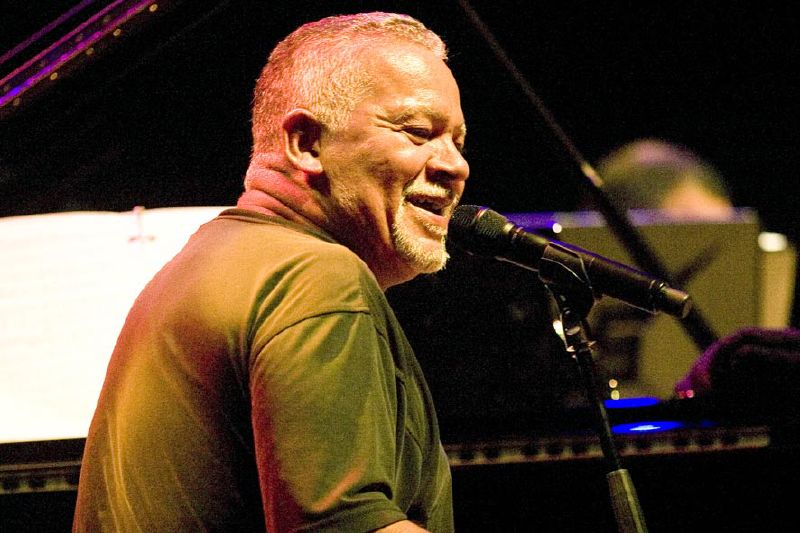
Hathaway collaborated with Joe Sample (pictured) on the album The Song Lives On

In 1996, Hathaway performed a rendition of jazz standard "Summertime" for Marcus Miller's live album Live & More. Through her friendship with Miller, Hathaway was introduced to American musician Joe Sample. In 1999, Hathaway signed a one-album deal with GRP Records, a jazz record label which featured Joe Sample on its roster. In collaboration with Sample, Hathaway released her third album The Song Lives On in April 1999. The Song Lives On peaked at number two on Billboard's Jazz Albums chart and at number fifty-three on the US Top R&B Albums chart. The album's lead single "When Your Life Was Low" peaked at number twenty on the US Adult R&B Songs chart.

In 2003, Hathaway signed with Mesa/Bluemoon Recordings. She released her fourth album Outrun the Sky on October 5, 2004, which peaked at number thirty-four on Billboard's Top R&B/Hip-Hop Albums chart. The album's lead single "Forever, for Always, for Love" became her first number one song on the US Adult R&B Songs chart. The follow-up single "Better and Better" peaked at number twenty-one. In May 2005, she embarked on the Daughters of Soul Tour alongside Sandra St. Victor, Nona Hendryx, Joyce Kennedy, Lisa Simone, and Indira Khan.

=== 2006–2012: Stax Records ===
In 2007, Hathaway signed a two-album recording contract with Stax Records. In March 2007, Stax Records released a tribute album Interpretations: Celebrating the Music of Earth, Wind & Fire, which featured Hathaway's cover version of Earth, Wind & Fire's song "Love's Holiday". In April 2008, Hathaway released the single "Let Go", which peaked at number fifty-one on the US Hot R&B/Hip-Hop Songs chart and number sixteen on the Adult R&B Songs chart. Two months later, Hathaway released her fifth album Self Portrait in June 2008. The album debuted at number sixty-three on the US Billboard 200 and number six on the US Top R&B/Hip-Hop Albums; her highest charting debut during that time. In October 2008, "That Was Then" was released as the second single and peaked at number thirty-two on the US Adult R&B Songs chart. The song was nominated for Best Female R&B Vocal Performance at the 52nd Annual Grammy Awards in 2010; her first Grammy Award nomination. In November 2008, Hathaway toured alongside Will Downing and Gerald Albright for the Soulful Christmas Tour.

In 2010, Hathaway collaborated with American musician Kirk Whalum on the song "He's Been Just that Good" for his album The Gospel According to Jazz: Chapter III. The song peaked at number twenty-one on the US Gospel Airplay chart. "He's Been Just that Good" also earned a nomination for Best Gospel Performance at the 53rd Annual Grammy Awards in 2011. In October 2011, Hathaway released her sixth album Where It All Begins. Where It All Begins became her highest-debuting album on the US Billboard 200, peaking at number thirty-two. The album's lead single "If You Want To" peaked at number twenty-four on the Adult R&B Songs chart. The album's follow-up single "You Were Meant for Me" peaked at number twenty-nine on the Adult R&B Songs chart.

=== 2013–2023: Career breakthrough and Hathaway Entertainment ===
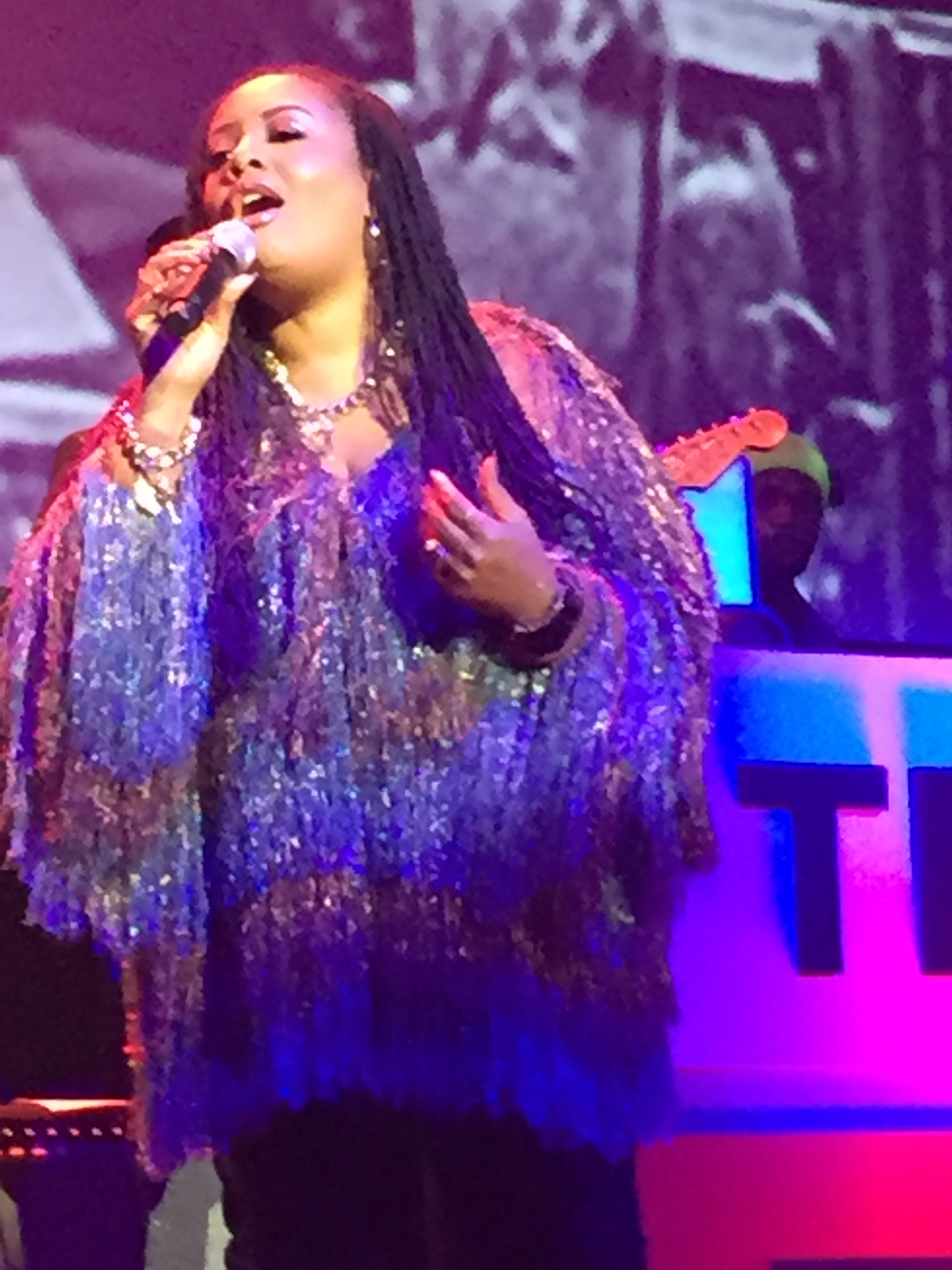
Hathaway performing in 2018

In September 2013, Snarky Puppy released their studio live album Family Dinner – Volume 1, which features a collaborative performance of Snarky Puppy and Hathaway on a re-recorded version of Hathaway's song "Something". The song won a Grammy Award for Best R&B Performance at the 56th Annual Grammy Awards in 2014. In October 2013, Hathaway featured on the song "Jesus Children" for Robert Glasper's album Black Radio 2. The song won a Grammy Award for Best Traditional R&B Performance at the 57th Annual Grammy Awards in 2015.

In October 2015, Hathaway released her live album Lalah Hathaway Live on eOne Music. The album became her highest-debuting album on the US Top R&B/Hip-Hop Albums chart, debuting and peaking at number two. The album's lead single "Little Ghetto Boy" won a Grammy Award for Best Traditional R&B Performance at the 58th Annual Grammy Awards in 2016. The album's second single "Angel", a cover version of Anita Baker's song, became her second number-one song on the Adult R&B Songs chart. The song held the top position for nine weeks. Hathaway's version of "Angel" won a Grammy Award for Best Traditional R&B Performance at the 59th Annual Grammy Awards in 2017. Her live album also won a Grammy Award for Best R&B Album.

In July 2017, she released a single titled "I Can't Wait" which peaked at number twenty on the Adult R&B Songs chart. On October 20, 2017, she released her seventh album Honestly on her own independent label Hathaway Entertainment. The album peaked at number nine on Billboard's Independent Albums chart. In June 2018, she released a deluxe edition of her album Honestly. In 2021, Hathaway was featured on the song "Coastin'" for Boney James' album Detour. "Coastin'" peaked at number seventeen on the Adult R&B Songs chart.

=== 2024–present: Vantablack ===
In June 2024, she released her eighth album Vantablack on her own record label Hathaway Entertainment. On November 8, 2024, Hathaway headlined the Palm Springs Women's Jazz Festival which was held at the Annenberg Theater in Palm Springs, California.

== Artistry ==
=== Voice and musical style ===
So some folks know the Joe Sample or the Kirk Whalum records, and they think I'm a jazz singer. There are people that know about the Donald Lawrence and the John P. Kee and Take 6 records so they think I'm a gospel singer. Others know about the Mary J. Blige or the Snoop records or the Kendrick records so they think I'm like an R&B singer or whatever that is called now. They've heard records with Gregory Porter and they think I'm a neo soul singer or they’ve heard records with Jose James and they think I'm a neo soul singer. Wherever folks are on their path, wherever they meet me, that's what they think that I do and that is okay for me because I do all of those things.

— Lalah Hathaway

Hathaway's voice is classified as a contralto. Music critic Alex Henderson of AllMusic described Hathaway's voice as "a big vocal range, but also plenty of charisma, passion, and charm to go with it." She is also known for multiphonic singing which allows her to "split" her voice and sing several notes at the same time. Hathaway's method generates two distinct pitches from the vocal folds directly.

Her music includes various styles of musical genres such as contemporary R&B, neo soul, funk, jazz, pop, and gospel. Her debut album Lalah Hathaway (1990) followed a contemporary R&B sound, while her third album The Song Lives On (1999) featured a jazz sound. Hathaway also continued performing jazz music on Kirk Whalum's The Gospel According to Jazz: Chapter III (2010) and Boney James' "Coastin'" (2021).

=== Influences ===
Hathaway has always cited her father Donny Hathaway as a major musical influence. Hathaway has covered several of her father's songs including "Little Ghetto Boy", "You Were Meant for Me", and "This Christmas"; the latter of which was recorded as a posthumous duet with Donny Hathaway using with instrumentation and unreleased vocals by Donny from an unreleased demo of the song from 1970. Hathaway and her sister Kenya Hathaway performed "Where Is the Love" at the Grammy Salute To Music Legends in 2019.

Hathaway also cites Miles Davis as another major music influence. In an interview with DownBeat, Hathaway stated, "I never met Miles, but he was a huge influence. I see myself as a vocalist who improvises, which I got from Miles. Kind of Blue is at the top of my [list of] 10 Desert Island albums. Miles plays pure." Hathaway was heavily influenced by Ella Fitzgerald, and once said "She helped me define my voice as an instrument." Her other musical influences include Prince, Joni Mitchell, Stevie Wonder, Marcus Miller, Anita Baker, Luther Vandross, Chet Baker, and Patti LaBelle.

== Business and ventures ==
In 2015, Hathaway founded her own entertainment company Hathaway Entertainment which formed as an imprint based from eOne Music, the company began as a production unit for music and videos in 2017. The company has distributed Hathaway's albums such as Lalah Hathaway Live (2015), Honestly (2017), and Vantablack (2024).

=== Philanthropy ===
Hathaway was a national ambassador for Susan G. Komen's Circle of Promise; a breast cancer organization. The Circle of Promise campaign aimed to educate and mobilize the African-American community in the fight against breast cancer. Although Hathaway no longer serves an official ambassador, she continues to encourage women about the cancer. In 2022, Hathaway partnered with the Wesley Community Service Center (WCSC), to raise money for an education facility, which will house a Head Start program and other community services for Portsmouth, Virginia and Hampton Roads residents.

== Discography ==
Albums

- Lalah Hathaway (1990)
- A Moment (1994)
- The Song Lives On (with Joe Sample) (1999)
- Outrun the Sky (2004)
- Self Portrait (2008)
- Where It All Begins (2011)
- Honestly (2017)
- Vantablack (2024)
- Made In Chicago (2026)

== Awards and nominations ==
=== Grammy Awards ===
Year	Category	Work	Result	Ref.
2010	Best Female R&B Vocal Performance	"That Was Then"	Nominated	
2011	Best Female R&B Vocal Performance	"He's Been Just That Good"	Nominated	
2014	Best R&B Performance	"Something"	Won	
2015	Best Traditional R&B Performance	"Jesus Children"	Won	
2016	Best Traditional R&B Performance	"Little Ghetto Boy"	Won	
2017	Best Traditional R&B Performance	"Angel"	Won	
2017	Best R&B Album	Lalah Hathaway Live	Won	
2019	Best Traditional R&B Performance	"Made for Love"	Nominated	
2019	Best R&B Performance	"Y O Y"	Nominated	
2019	Best R&B Album	Honestly	Nominated	
2025	Best Traditional R&B Performance	"No Lie"	Nominated	
2025	Best R&B Album	Vantablack	Nominated	
2026	Best Traditional R&B Performance	"Uptown"	Nominated	
2027	Best Traditional R&B Performance	"Can't Let Go"	Pending	
2027	Best R&B Collaboration or Duo/Group Performance	"47th Street" (featuring J. Ivy)	Pending	

=== Soul Train Music Awards ===
Year	Category	Work	Result	Ref.
2016	Centric Certified Award	—	Nominated	
2017	Best R&B/Soul Female Artist	—	Nominated	
2017	Soul Train Certified Award	—	Nominated	
