= Covered (Robert Glasper album) =

Covered: Recorded Live at Capitol Studios

Studio album by The Robert Glasper Trio
- Released: June 16, 2015
- Recorded: December 2–3, 2014
- Studios: Capitol Studios (Hollywood, California)
- Genre: Jazz
- Length: 71:54
- Label: Blue Note
- Producer: Robert Glasper

Robert Glasper chronology
Black Radio 2 (2013)	Covered: Recorded Live at Capitol Studios (2015)	Everything's Beautiful (2016)

Covered: Recorded Live at Capitol Studios (simply shortened as Covered) is the seventh album by American musician Robert Glasper. It was released on June 16, 2015, via Blue Note Records. Recording sessions took place at Capitol Studios in Hollywood on the 2 and 3 December 2014. Production was handled by Robert Glasper himself, with Don Was and Nicole Hegeman serving as executive producers. It features song covers of artists like John Legend, Radiohead and Joni Mitchell with a few original tracks mixed in. Harry Belafonte, Iskinder "Skindoo" Adefris-Yaxley, Josiah Xavier Brown, Musiq Soulchild, Ralphie "Hoop" Richardson, Riley Kirkland Glasper and Samuel Josef Brown have provided special guest appearances on the project.

The album peaked at number 190 on the Billboard 200 and number two on both the Traditional Jazz Albums and Jazz Albums charts in the United States. It was also nominated for a Grammy Award for Best Jazz Instrumental Album at the 58th Annual Grammy Awards, but lost to John Scofield's Past Present.

== Background ==
For this album, Glasper reunited with Vicente Archer and Damion Reid as The Robert Glasper Trio with whom he released Canvas and In My Element and went back to the instrumentation of his earlier sounds. Glasper used material from artists such as Radiohead, John Legend, Joni Mitchell, Kendrick Lamar and Jhené Aiko, blending several different music genres into a more coherent sound than he put out with his other band. Four of the twelve tracks on the album were at least partially written by Glasper himself.

== Critical reception ==
Professional ratings
Aggregate scores
Source	Rating
Metacritic	74/100
Review scores
Source	Rating
AllMusic	4/5 stars
Los Angeles Times	2.5/4 stars
Pitchfork	6.7/10
PopMatters	8/10; 7/10
The Arts Desk	4/5 stars
The Guardian	4/5 stars
Tom Hull	B+

Covered was met with generally favorable reviews from music critics. At Metacritic, which assigns a normalized rating out of 100 to reviews from mainstream publications, the album received an average score of 74 based on eight reviews.

AllMusic's Thom Jurek praised the album, writing "this set is welcoming, open, and warm: it invites fans of all of his musical pursuits along for the ride". Rob Caldwell of PopMatters wrote that the album "stands, in the end, as a multi-layered work possessing an air of adventure, while still remaining accessible. It's a rewarding collection by one of the most significant composers and interpreters in contemporary jazz". John Fordham of The Guardian wrote: "quotes on black self-respect from Harry Belafonte and the haunting sound of a piano-shadowed children's chorus namechecking African-Americans who have died at police hands furnish some sobering context for a warm, musical and humane Glasper venture". Another PopMatters reviewer, Will Layman, stated: "on Covered Glasper does not try to answer his critics directly, but he certainly plays both wonderfully and from the heart". Marcus J. Moore of Pitchfork wrote: "it's a no-frills record that recedes into the background without much fuss, which works for and against the album's overall impact". Chris Barton of Los Angeles Times resumed: "amid so much rewarding yet familiar ground, Covered sounds more like a step sideways rather than forward".

== Track listing ==
Covered track listing
No.	Title	Writer(s)	Length
1.	"Intro"	Robert Glasper	2:12
2.	"I Don't Even Care"	Glasper; Natalie McIntyre; Tsidi Ibrahim	7:42
3.	"Reckoner"	Thomas Yorke; Jonathan Richard Guy Greenwood; Colin Charles Greenwood; Edward John O'Brien; Philip James Selway	5:07
4.	"Barangrill"	Roberta Joan "Joni" Mitchell	7:06
5.	"In Case You Forgot"	Glasper	13:01
6.	"So Beautiful" (featuring Musiq Soulchild)	Lee Hutson Jr.; Taalib Johnson	7:39
7.	"The Worst"	Brian Keith Warfield; Maclean Robinson; Jhené Aiko Chilombo; Charles Edward Hugo; Pharrell Williams; Shawn Corey Carter	5:21
8.	"Good Morning"	Andrew Ramsey; Britten Newbill; John Stephens; Shannon Sanders	4:51
9.	"Stella by Starlight"	Victor Young; Edward Washington	4:37
10.	"Levels"	Bilal Oliver	7:38
11.	"Got Over" (featuring Harry Belafonte)	Glasper; Harold Bellanfanti Jr.	2:07
12.	"I'm Dying of Thirst" (featuring Iskinder "Skindoo" Adefris-Yaxley, Josiah Xavier Brown, Ralphie "Hoop" Richardson, Riley Kirkland Glasper and Samuel Josef Brown)	Quincy Jones; Kendrick Lamar; Alan Bergman; Marilyn Bergman	4:33
Total length:			71:54

== Personnel ==
The Robert Glasper Trio

- Robert Glasper – piano, arrangement
- Vicente Archer – bass
- Damion Reid – drums

Other musicians

- Taalib "Musiq Soulchild" Johnson – featured artist (track 6)
- Harold "Harry Belafonte" Bellanfanti Jr. – featured artist (track 11)
- Iskiner "Skindoo" Adefris-Yaxley – featured artist (track 12)
- Josiah Xavier Brown – featured artist (track 12)
- Ralphie "Hoop" Richardson – featured artist (track 12)
- Riley Kirkland Glasper – featured artist (track 12)
- Samuel Josef Brown – featured artist (track 12)

Production

- Robert Glasper – producer
- Keith Lewis – engineering, mixing
- Hayden Miller – art direction, design
- Don Q. Hannah – photography
- Mitch Blackman – booking

== Charts ==
Chart performance for Covered
Chart (2005)	Peak position
Belgian Albums (Ultratop Flanders)	113
US Billboard 200	190
US Top Jazz Albums (Billboard)	2
