= Real Enemies =

Studio album by Darcy James Argue's Secret Society
- Released: 2016
- Recorded: February 1 and 4, 2016
- Genre: Jazz
- Length: 78:46
- Label: New Amsterdam

Darcy James Argue's Secret Society chronology
Brooklyn Babylon (2013)	Real Enemies (2016)	Dynamic Maximum Tension (2023)

Real Enemies is an album by Darcy James Argue's Secret Society. It earned Argue and the Secret Society a Grammy Award nomination for Best Large Jazz Ensemble Album.

== Track listing ==
All tracks are written by Darcy James Argue.

No.	Title	Length
1.	"You Are Here"	8:06
2.	"Enemy Within"	4:37
3.	"Dark Alliance"	7:04
4.	"Trust No One"	5:20
5.	"Silent Weapons for Quiet Wars"	6:47
6.	"Best Friends Forever"	4:26
7.	"The Hidden Hand"	6:15
8.	"Casus Belli"	5:37
9.	"Crisis Control"	7:02
10.	"Apocalypse Is a Process"	5:47
11.	"Never a Straight Answer"	7:27
12.	"Who Do You Trust?"	4:17
13.	"You Are Here (Reprise)"	6:01

== Personnel ==
- Darcy James Argue – producer, liner notes
- Jonathan Powell – flugelhorn
- Matt Holman – flugelhorn
- Nadje Noordhuis – flugelhorn
- Ingrid Jensen – trumpet
- Jacob Garchik – trombone
- Mike Fahie – trombone
- Ryan Keberle – trombone
- Rob Wilkerson – alto saxophone
- Dave Pietro – alto saxophone, piccolo
- John Ellis – tenor saxophone
- Sam Sadigursky – tenor saxophone, clarinet
- Carl Maraghi – baritone saxophone
- Adam Birnbaum – piano, electric piano
- Matt Clohesy – bass
- Sebastian Noelle – guitar
- Alan Ferber – producer
- James Urbaniak – engineer, narrator
- Brian Montgomery – engineer, mixing, producer
- Dustin Marshall – engineer
- Alex Hendrickson – assistant engineer
- Jack Mason – assistant engineer
- Randy Merrill – mastering
