= Dynamic Maximum Tension =

Studio album by Darcy James Argue's Secret Society
- Released: September 8, 2023
- Genre: Jazz
- Label: Nonesuch

Darcy James Argue's Secret Society chronology
Real Enemies (2016)	Dynamic Maximum Tension (2023)

Dynamic Maximum Tension ratings
Review scores
Source	Rating
All About Jazz	4/5 stars
DownBeat	4.5/5 stars
Jazzwise	4/5 stars

Dynamic Maximum Tension is an album by Darcy James Argue's Secret Society. It earned a Grammy Award nomination for Best Large Jazz Ensemble Album.

== Track listing ==
1. Dymaxion
2. All In
3. Ebonite
4. Last Waltz for Levon
5. Wingèd Beasts
6. Your Enemies Are Asleep
7. Codebreaker
8. Ferromagnetic
9. Single-Cell Jitterbug
10. Tensile Curves
11. Mae West: Advice

== Personnel ==
- Darcy James Argue – composer, conductor
- Dave Pietro – piccolo, flute, alto flute, soprano sax, alto sax
- Rob Wilkerson – flute, clarinet, soprano sax, alto sax
- Sam Sadigursky – clarinet, tenor sax
- John Ellis – clarinet, bass clarinet, tenor sax
- Carl Maraghi – clarinet, bass clarinet, baritone sax
- Seneca Black – trumpet, flugelhorn
- Liesl Whitaker – trumpet, flugelhorn
- Matt Holman – trumpet, flugelhorn
- Nadje Noordhuis – trumpet, flugelhorn
- Mike Fahie – trombone
- Ryan Keberle – trombone
- Jacob Garchik – trombone
- Jennifer Wharton – bass trombone, tuba
- Sebastian Noelle – acoustic/electric guitar
- Adam Birnbaum – acoustic/electric piano
- Matt Clohesy – contrabass, electric bass
- Jon Wikan – drum set, cajón
- Ingrid Jensen – trumpet (1, 3–6, 8, 9, 11), flugelhorn (1, 3–6, 8, 9, 11)
- Brandon Lee – trumpet (2, 7, 10), flugelhorn (2, 7, 10)
- Sara Caswell – violin (10), hardanger d'amore (10)
- Cécile McLorin Salvant – vocals (11)
