= John Ellis (saxophonist) =

- Born: John Axson Ellis; April 13, 1974 (age 51); North Carolina
- Genres: Jazz
- Occupation: Musician
- Instrument: Saxophone
- Years active: 1990s–present
- Labels: Hyena, Parade Light
- Website: johnaxsonellis.com

John Axson Ellis (born April 13, 1974) is an American jazz saxophonist. He performed in the group Doublewide with Jason Marsalis.

== Career ==
A native of North Carolina, Ellis learned clarinet and piano as a child. During the 1990s in New Orleans he studied with Ellis Marsalis and performed with Brian Blade and Nicholas Payton. He released his debut album, Language of Love, independently in 1996. He received a music degree from the New School in New York City and won second place in the 2002 Thelonius Monk Institute of Jazz International Saxophone Competition. He traveled to Africa as a cultural ambassador for the United States Information Agency.

With playwright Andy Bragen Ellis composed the theatrical works Dreamscapes, The Ice Siren, and Mobro. An album version of The Ice Siren with Gretchen Parlato on vocals was released in 2020.

Ellis has worked with The Holmes Brothers, Charlie Hunter, John Patitucci, Lonnie Smith, Sting, Helen Sung, and Miguel Zenón.

== Discography ==
=== As leader/co-leader ===
- Language of Love (Riding Between Cars Recordings, 1997)
- Roots, Branches & Leaves (Fresh Sound, 2002) – recorded in 2000
- One Foot in the Swamp (Hyena, 2005)
- By a Thread (Hyena, 2006)
- Dance Like There's No Tomorrow (Hyena, 2008)
- Puppet Mischief (ObliqSound, 2010)
- It's You I Like (Criss Cross, 2012) – recorded in 2011
- MOBRO with Andy Bragen (Parade Light, 2014)
- Charm (Parade Light, 2015)
- The Ice Siren with Andy Bragen (Parade Light, 2020)
- When the World Was Young (Independent, 2020)
- All Things Bright (Independent, 2020)
- Bizet: Carmen in Jazz (Blue Room Music, 2023)
- Heroes (Blue Room Music, 2025)
- Fireball (Sunnyside, 2026)

=== As sideman ===
With Charlie Hunter

- Songs from the Analog Playground (Blue Note, 2001)
- Right Now Move (Ropeadope, 2003)
- Friends Seen and Unseen (Ropeadope, 2004)
- Copperopolis (Ropeadope, 2006)

With Anne Mette Iversen

- Milo Songs (Bjurecords, 2011)
- So Many Roads (Bjurecords, 2014)
- Round Trip (Bjurecords, 2016)
- Racing a Butterfly (Bjurecords, 2020)

With Kat Edmonson

- Take to the Sky (Convivium, 2009)
- Way Down Low (Okeh, 2013)

With Kendrick Scott

- Conviction (Concord Jazz, 2013)
- We Are the Drum (Blue Note, 2015)

With Ben Sidran

- Don't Cry for No Hipster (Nardis, 2012)
- Picture Him Happy (Bonsai Music, 2017)

With Lonnie Smith

- In the Beginning (Pilgrimage, 2013)[2CD]
- Evolution (Blue Note, 2016)

With others

- Darcy James Argue, Brooklyn Babylon (New Amsterdam, 2013)
- Will Bernard, Just Like Downtown (Posi-Tone, 2013)
- Laila Biali, Out of Dust (ACT, 2020)
- Erin Bode, The Little Garden (Native Language, 2008)
- Sean Costello, Sean Costello (Tone-Cool, 2004)
- Caramelos de Cianuro, 8 (Sonografica, 2016)
- Gilfema, Gilfema + 2 (Obliqsound, 2008)
- Robert Glasper, Mood (Fresh Sound, 2003)
- Jon Gordon, Evolution (ArtistShare, 2009)
- Norah Jones, ... Featuring Norah Jones (Blue Note, 2010) – compilation
- Kathy Kosins, Vintage (Mahogany, 2005)
- Michael Leonhart, Suite Extracts Vol. 1 (Sunnyside, 2019)
- Mike Moreno, Between the Lines (World Culture Music, 2007)
- Igor Lumpert, Eleven (Clean Feed, 2018) – recorded in 2017
- Eric Revis, Laughter's Necklace of Tears (11:11, 2009)
- Robert Sadin, Art of Love: (Deutsche Grammophon, 2009)
- Kate Schutt, Telephone Game (ArtistShare, 2008)
- Leo Sidran, Cool School (Bonsai Music, 2018)
- Edward Simon, Venezuelan Suite (Sunnyside, 2013) – recorded in 2012
- Sting, If on a Winter's Night... (Deutsche Grammophon/Cherrytree, 2009)
- Helen Sung, Sung Without Words (Stricker Street, 2018)
