= Canvas (album) =

Studio album by Robert Glasper
- Released: October 4, 2005
- Recorded: May 13–25, 2005
- Studio: Systems Two, Brooklyn
- Genre: Jazz fusion, post-bop
- Length: 64:28
- Label: Blue Note
- Producer: Eli Wolf

Robert Glasper chronology
| Mood (2004) | Canvas (2005) | In My Element (2007) |

Canvas is a studio album by jazz pianist and composer Robert Glasper, released on the Blue Note label. The album is Glasper's first for a major label.

== Reception ==
Professional ratings
Review scores
| Source | Rating |
|---|---|
| AllMusic | 4/5 stars |
| All About Jazz | 4/5 stars |
| The Guardian | 3/5 stars |
| PopMatters | 4/10 |
| The Penguin Guide to Jazz Recordings | 4/4 stars |
| Tom Hull | B |

The AllMusic review by Ronnie D. Langford Jr. stated "Canvas is both melodic and adventurous, and will please both Glasper's fans and anyone who appreciates good piano jazz".

On All About Jazz, Chris May said "his music is firmly—gloriously—in the Tyner/Hancock/Jarrett tradition: harmonically and melodically rich, rhythmically virile, and focused on in-the-moment improv. ... A beautiful balance of energy, momentum, and melody, Canvas announces the arrival of a new keyboard star-in-the-making, and a burning new trio. Wonderful stuff".

In The Guardian, John Fordham observed "Robert Glasper is a 26-year-old Houston-born piano virtuoso with a light, dancing touch. ... On the face of it, Canvas sounds like the work of just another mostly-acoustic keyboard threesome in a jazz landscape teeming with such outfits. Glasper applies wistful Bill Evans chords to softly waltzing ballads. He fuels uptempo pieces with taut and shapely bursts of Hancockish virtuosity and adopts a gently rocking lyricism along the lines of Jarrett and Mehldau here and there. ... The originals are by no means as striking as the playing, but you can hear why Blue Note has hopes for this newcomer, who is steeped in tradition yet audibly contemporary".

In JazzTimes, David R. Adler wrote "Canvas situates Glasper to full advantage. ... All the tracks but “Riot” are originals, although Glasper's take on Hancock stands out as an artistic centerpiece. Playing Rhodes as well as piano, he takes a seemingly inconsequential snippet of the melody and loops it as a five-bar phrase for soloing. As an example of sonic and formal creativity, this is a stunner. But it's also a window into Glasper's emerging sound, in which advanced jazz lines, neosoul cadences and hints of hip-hop rhythm all play a role.".

On PopMatters, Robert R. Calder was less positive noting "This is on the whole a disappointing set, the fault probably being Blue Note's, for not getting more variety from this undoubtedly extraordinarily able young pianist from Texas ... The tendency here is to play a chorus, followed by a chorus, followed by a chorus, and round and round it goes, even if the time signature's changing. He shouldn't have been allowed to record so much running on the spot. He is a young pianist of talent who can do amazing things".

== Track listing ==
All songs composed by Robert Glasper except "Riot" composed by Herbie Hancock.

1. "Rise and Shine" – 7:37
2. "Canvas" – 9:57
3. "Portrait of an Angel" – 5:24
4. "Enoch's Meditation" – 8:12
5. "Centelude" – 1:06
6. "Jelly's da Beener" – 7:46
7. "Chant" – 8:17
8. "Riot" – 6:20
9. "North Portland" – 5:51
10. "I Remember" – 5:58

== Personnel ==
Musicians

- Robert Glasper – piano
- Vicente Archer – bass
- Damion Reid – drums
- Mark Turner – tenor saxophone (tracks 2 & 8)
- Bilal – vocals (tracks 7 & 10)

Production

- Eli Wolf – Producer, A&R
- Chris Cofoni – A&R administration
- Joe Marciano – engineer (recording, mixing)
- Mike Marciano – engineer (mastering)
- Max Ross – assistant engineer (pro-tools)
- Burgess Management – management
- Perry Greenfield – product manager
- Gordon H Jee – creative director
- Burton Yount – art direction, design
- Clay Patrick McBride – photography
