= Miles Ahead =

Miles Ahead may refer to:

- Miles Ahead (album), 1957 album by Miles Davis
- Miles Ahead (film), 2015 film about Miles Davis
- Miles Ahead (soundtrack), soundtrack to the film
