= Barangrill =

1972 song by Joni Mitchell

"Barangrill" is a 1972 song written and originally recorded by Canadian singer songwriter Joni Mitchell on her fifth studio album, For the Roses. It is the third track on the album and its style is illustrative of Mitchell's growing focus on jazz which became central to her work for the rest of the decade. Jazz pianist Robert Glasper later covered the song on his album Covered: Recorded Live at Capitol Studios, noting his love for the song's poetry and its chord changes.

Mitchell has discussed the themes and origins of the song on a number of occasions. At the Troubadour in the autumn of 1972, she referred to the song as a search for a guru in ordinary settings such as restaurants and gas stations. She has also said that it concerns the search for answers to spiritual and philosophical questions spurred by a personal crisis, and the search leading one to a restaurant in British Columbia. In one interview, Mitchell used the song as an example of how her songwriting adapts from the details of her real life experiences.

"Barangrill", along with the rest of For the Roses, was added to the National Recording Registry maintained by the Library of Congress in 2007.
