= Damion Reid =

American drummer (born 1979)

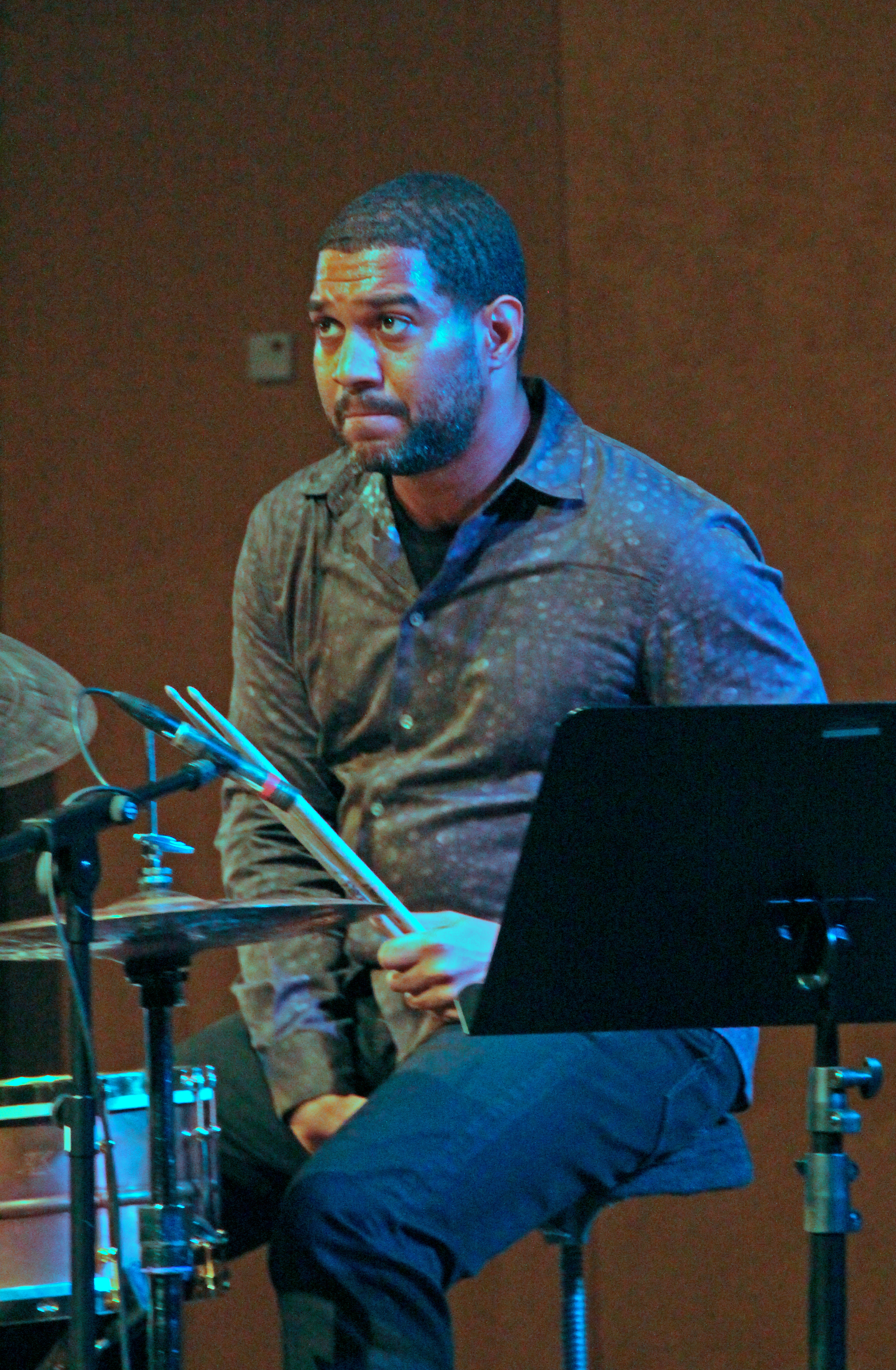
- Damion Reid in 2016

Background information
- Born: 16 June 1979 (age 47); West Covina, California, United States
- Genres: Jazz, hip hop, rock, R&B
- Occupation: Musician
- Instrument: Drums
- Website: damionreid.com

Damion Reid (born June 16, 1979) is an American drummer. Critics have praised his "controlled fury" and "microscopically complex beats."

== Biography ==
Damion Reid was born June 16, 1979, in West Covina, California, east of Los Angeles, into a musical family. He played in church as a child and studied with drummer Billy Higgins. He has attended the New England Conservatory of Music, where his teachers included Cecil McBee, Danilo Pérez, Fred Buda and George Russell. Reid was a 1998 recipient of NEC's Alan Dawson Scholarship, and in 1999 was accepted into the Thelonious Monk Institute of Jazz at the University of Southern California. Reid has also attended The New School in New York City.

He has performed with Greg Osby, Terence Blanchard, Robert Glasper, Cassandra Wilson, Bruce Hornsby, Jacky Terrasson, Ravi Coltrane, Reggie Workman, Marcus Belgrave, Lauryn Hill, Angie Stone, Robert Hurst, Angélique Kidjo, Meshell Ndegeocello, Jason Moran, Steve Lehman, Mark Shim, Dianne Reeves, Mark Turner, Bunky Green, Steve Coleman and the Five Elements, Greg Ward's Phonic Juggernaut, the Steve Lehman Trio, various projects led by guitarist Miles Okazaki, Rudresh Mahanthappa and Bunky Green's APEX and the Steve Lehman-Rudresh Mahanthappa co-led project Dual Identity.

Reid's work on the Robert Glasper Trio album Covered earned him a Grammy nomination in 2016.

He currently lives in Brooklyn, New York, US.

== Discography ==
- Robert Hurst – Unrehurst (Bebob, 2001)
- Robert Glasper – Mood (Fresh Sound, 2002)
- Lucian Ban – Premonition (CIMP, 2003)
- Laurent Coq – Like a Tree in the City (Sunnyside, 2003)
- Robert Glasper – Canvas (Blue Note, 2005)
- Ergo – Quality Anatomechanical Music Since 2005 (Actuator, 2006)
- Robert Glasper – In My Element (Blue Note, 2007)
- Richard Reid – Have a Cup With (Roughhouse, 2008)
- Laurent Coq – Eight Fragments of Summer (88 Trees, 2009)
- Rudresh Mahanthappa and Steve Lehman – Dual Identity (Clean Feed, 2010)
- Rudresh Mahanthappa and Bunky Green – Apex (Pi Recordings, 2010)
- Greg Ward – Greg Ward's Phonic Juggernaut (Thirsty Ear, 2011)
- Rudresh Mahanthappa – Samdhi (ACT Music, 2011)
- Steve Lehman – Dialect Fluorescent (Pi Recordings, 2012)
- Steve Lehman and Sélébéyone – Sélébéyone (Pi Recordings, 2016)
- Steve Lehman – The People I Love (Pi Recordings, 2019)
- Jure Pukl – Abstract Society (Storyville Records, 2012)
- Michal Bugala – Y (Bugo Bros, 2012)
- Jonathan Finlayson – Moment and the Message (Pi Recording, 2013)
- Laurent Coq and Walter Smith III – The Lafayette Suite (Jazz & People, 2015)
- Robert Glasper – Covered (Blue Note, 2015)
- Liberty Ellman – Radiate (Pi Recordings, 2015)
- Igor Bezget, Marko Crnec & Damion Reid – Organics (Artomatik, 2016)
- Steve Lehman – Sélébéyone (Pi Recordings, 2016)
- Steve Lehman – The People I Love (Pi Recordings, 2019)

== Filmography ==
- Icons Among Us (Paradigm Studio, 2009)
- Brown Sugar (20th Century Fox, 2002)
- Sound of New York Ep. 6: Damion Reid (Qwest TV, 2017)

== Endorsements ==
Reid endorses Tama drums and hardware; Meinl Percussion cymbals; Aquarian drumheads; Vic Firth drumsticks, mallets and rutes; Westone in-ear monitors; and Trick drum pedals. In the past, Reid has endorsed Sonor and Sakae drums. AK Drums has produced a snare drum inspired by Reid's playing.
