= Maiden Voyage (composition) =

Jazz music composition composed by Herbie Hancock

"Maiden Voyage" opening vamp: Dsus chord in D Dorian, or mixolydian.

"Maiden Voyage" is a jazz composition by Herbie Hancock from his 1965 album Maiden Voyage. It features Hancock's quartet – trumpeter Freddie Hubbard, bassist Ron Carter and drummer Tony Williams – together with saxophonist George Coleman. It is one of Hancock's best-known compositions and has become a jazz standard.

The piece was used in a Yardley commercial and was originally listed on the album's master tape as "TV Jingle" until a friend of Hancock's sister came up with the new name. In the liner notes for the Maiden Voyage album, Hancock states that the composition was an attempt to capture "the splendor of a sea-going vessel on its maiden voyage".

Interviewed for KCET TV in 2011, Hancock said he considered Maiden Voyage to be his favorite of all of the compositions he had written.

== Harmonic Structure ==
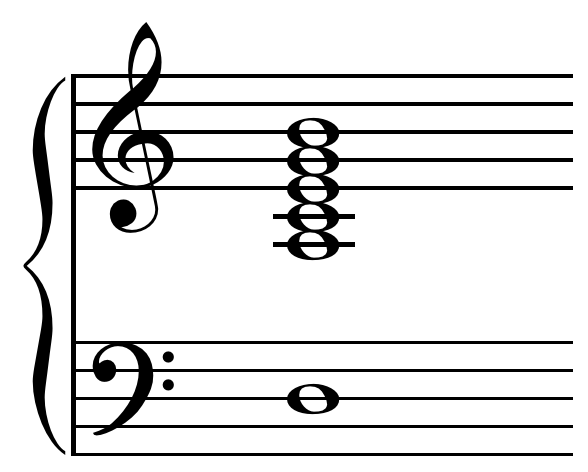
Opening chord: minor eleventh chord (Am9/D).

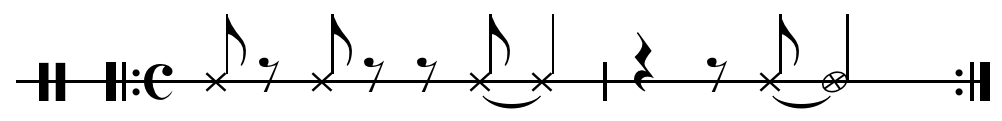
Rhythmic ostinato, a transformation of the bossa nova rhythm.

A modal jazz piece, the composition follows a 32-bar AABA form with only two chords in each section:

Ami7/D   |   |   |   |   Cmi7/F    |   |   |   |
Ami7/D   |   |   |   |   Cmi7/F    |   |   |   |
Bbmi7/Eb |   |   |   |   Dbm9      |   |   |   |
Ami7/D   |   |   |   |   Cmi7/F    |   |   |   |   [6]

There are several different perspectives on exactly how to label or interpret these harmonies. The chord voicings used by Hancock make extensive use of perfect fourths, and could be interpreted as quartal harmonies: for example, the opening chord Am7/D has the notes A, C, E, G, D, and the same notes in a different order spell out a series of perfect fourths creating a quartal chord, E, A, D, G, C.

Another common analysis in print is to label each chord a suspended chord. In this perspective, the first chord Am7/D (D, A, C, E, G) can be thought of as a Dm9 chord (D, F, A, C, E) with a suspended 4th (G instead of F). Along these lines, Jazz.com's Ted Gioia describes the harmonic progression used as "four suspended chords," Jerry Coker describes the progression as "only sus. 4 chords," From this perspective, the first chord is really an extended Dm chord with a suspension.

On the other hand, The Real Book lists the chords as four minor seventh chords with the bass note a fifth below the root which matches Hancock's description of the opening chord (right). The Real Book erroneously spells the fourth chord (measures 22-24) as A♭-7/D♭, while Owens correctly identifies it as C♯m13. The inclusion of the E natural in the original recording of the song supports Owens' interpretation of the chord. While the pitches of C♯m13 and A♭-7/D♭ may appear to be enharmonic equivalents, the presence of the E natural in the fourth chord distinguishes the two chords.

== Recorded Versions ==
- Herbie Hancock, on his album Maiden Voyage
- Bobby Hutcherson, on his album Happenings
- Ramsey Lewis, on his album Maiden Voyage
- Grant Green, on the album Alive!
- Brian Auger and the Trinity, on the 1970 album Befour
- Jazz rock band Blood, Sweat, and Tears, on their 1972 album New Blood
- Jon Lucien, on the 1975 album Song for My Lady featuring lyrics by Herbie Hancock's sibling Jean Hancock.
- Norman Connors, on the 1975 album Saturday Night Special.
- The rock band Phish performed the song in their early concerts. A live version was released on their album Colorado '88.
- Toto, on their 2002 album Through the Looking Glass. This recording included elements of Hancock's 1974 song "Butterfly".
- Robert Glasper, on his 2004 album Mood. He recorded it again on his 2007 album In My Element, this time as a medley with Radiohead's "Everything in Its Right Place".
- Mr Jukes, on the 2019 Blue Note Re:Imagined compilation.
