= Infernal Machines =

Studio album by Darcy James Argue's Secret Society
- Released: May 12, 2009
- Recorded: December 15–17, 2008
- Genre: Jazz, big band
- Length: 67:01
- Label: New Amsterdam
- Producer: Sherisse Rogers, Paul Cox, and Darcy James Argue

Darcy James Argue's Secret Society chronology
Infernal Machines (2009)	Brooklyn Babylon (2012)

Infernal Machines is the debut studio album by Darcy James Argue's big band Secret Society. The album was released May 12, 2009 by New Amsterdam Records and was nominated for a Grammy Award.

== Reception ==
Professional ratings
Review scores
Source	Rating
AllMusic	4/5 stars
All About Jazz	5/5 stars

The album was praised for its "impressionistic" elements and fresh outlook on jazz orchestra culture. It is credited with "launch[ing Argue] from Brooklyn-based unknown into the international conversation (and touring circuit)". The AllMusic review stated "Argue's music is a stunning display in diversity within drawn out, developed themes, requiring a keen ear. It's an exceptional example of new jazz music that deserves a broad forum for listening and appreciating". On All About Jazz Troy Collins wrote "Although the halcyon days of the big bands are long past, Infernal Machines stands defiant, updating the big band tradition for the new millennium while presenting exciting possibilities for the future".

== Track listing ==
All compositions by Darcy James Argue

1. "Phobos" – 11:02
2. "Zeno" – 7:14
3. "Transit" – 7:01
4. "Redeye" – 10:12
5. "Jacobin Club" – 10:55
6. "Habeas Corpus (for Maher Arar)" – 10:57
7. "Obsidian Flow" – 9:40

== Personnel ==
- Erica von Kleist – winds
- Sam Sadigursky – winds
- Rob Wilkerson – winds
- Mark Small – winds
- Josh Sinton – winds
- Seneca Black – trumpet and flugelhorn
- Laurie Frink – trumpet and flugelhorn
- Tom Goehring – trumpet and flugelhorn
- Nadje Noordhuis – trumpet and flugelhorn
- Ingrid Jensen – trumpet and flugelhorn
- Mike Fahie – trombone
- James Hirschfeld – trombone
- Ryan Keberle – trombone
- Jennifer Wharton – bass trombone
- Sebastian Noelle – acoustic and electric guitar
- Mike Holober – piano and Rhodes electric piano
- Matt Clohesy – contrabass and bass guitar
- Jon Wikan – drums and percussion
