= In My Element =

Studio album by Robert Glasper
- Released: March 20, 2007
- Recorded: September 21–November 1, 2006
- Studio: Systems Two Studios (Brooklyn, NY)
- Genre: Post-bop
- Length: 1:12:59
- Label: Blue Note
- Producer: Eli Wolf; Robert Glasper

Robert Glasper chronology
Canvas (2005)	In My Element (2007)	Double-Booked (2009)

Professional ratings
Review scores
Source	Rating
All About Jazz	4/5 stars
AllMusic	4/5 stars
PopMatters	9/10
The Penguin Guide to Jazz	3.5/4 stars
Tom Hull	B+

In My Element is the third studio album by American musician Robert Glasper. It was released on March 20, 2007 via Blue Note Records. Recording sessions took place at Systems Two Studios in Brooklyn from September 21, 2006 to November 1, 2006. Production was handled by Glasper himself together with Eli Wolf. It features contributions from Vicente Archer on bass, Damion Reid on drums and spoken word from Reverend Joe Ratliff.

In the United States, the album peaked at number 9 on the Jazz Albums and number 6 on the Traditional Jazz Albums charts.

== Track listing ==
No.	Title	Writer(s)	Length
1.	"G&B"	Robert Glasper	8:29
2.	"Of Dreams to Come"	Glasper	8:11
3.	"F.T.B."	Glasper	5:57
4.	"Y'outta Praise Him" (Intro)	Glasper	3:35
5.	"Y'outta Praise Him"	Glasper	6:46
6.	"Beatrice"	Sam Rivers	8:56
7.	"Medley: Maiden Voyage/Everything in Its Right Place"	Herbie Hancock; Radiohead	8:43
8.	"J Dillalude"	Glasper; James Yancey	4:26
9.	"Silly Rabbit"	Glasper	7:20
10.	"One for 'Grew"	Glasper	6:33
11.	"Tribute"	Glasper	3:43
Total length:			1:12:59

== Personnel ==
- Robert Glasper – piano, producer
- Vicente Archer – bass
- Damion Reid – drums
- Reverend Joe Ratliff – voice (track 11)
- Eli Wolf – producer
- Joe Marciano – recording, mixing
- Mike Marciano – mastering
- Max Ross – engineering assistant
- Carla Leighton – art direction, design
- Jessica Chornesky – photography
- Jos L. Knaepen – photography
- Keith Karwelies – A&R
- Gordon H Jee – creative director
- Angelika Beener – project coordinator
- Shanieka D. Brooks – product manager

== Charts ==
Chart (2007)	Peak position
US Top Jazz Albums (Billboard)	9
