= Mood (Robert Glasper album) =

Studio album by Robert Glasper
- Released: November 16, 2004
- Recorded: 17–20 May 2002
- Studio: Systems Two Recording Studio
- Genre: Jazz
- Length: 67:51
- Label: Fresh Sound New Talent
- Producer: David Weiss

Robert Glasper chronology
Mood (2004)	Canvas (2005)

Professional ratings
Review scores
Source	Rating
All About Jazz	4/5 stars
AllMusic	4/5 stars

Mood is a debut studio album by American jazz pianist Robert Glasper recorded together with Robert Hurst on bass and Damion Reid on drums. The record was released on November 16, 2004 by Fresh Sound New Talent.

== Background ==
The album includes nine tracks with seven written by Glasper. It also includes covers of Herbie Hancock's track "Maiden Voyage" and Irving Berlin's "Blue Sky", and features singer Bilal. The album was well-received and convinced Blue Note to add Glasper to its selective roster.

== Reception ==
Michael G. Nastos of AllMusic stated, "Robert Glasper's debut as a leader displays his immense talent in full force as a legitimate original modern jazz voice. The majority of selections are with a trio, perfectly suiting his inclination to improvise, and hints at the hip-hop rhythms of his generation. The clear highlight is his bomb virtuosic interpretation of "Blue Skies." Ideas flow into infinity, he's insanely inspired, with bright melodies bursting like a supernova. He uses chord substitutions liberally and during an unaccompanied bridge, his emotions burn at length." All About Jazz review commented, "Overall, this is a nice if not quite outstanding record. Those who have heard Glasper live or on record—on Mark Whitfield's Raw he is particularly fine—will welcome this worthy first outing by the young pianist. And for those as yet unacquainted with Glasper, there are plenty of younger pianists by whom one could do worse. Look for Mr. Glasper to be an in-demand sideman and recording artist for a long time."

== Track listing ==
No.	Title	Writer(s)	Length
1.	"Maiden Voyage"	Herbie Hancock	5:11
2.	"Lil Tipsy"	Glasper	9:21
3.	"Alone Together"	Arthur Schwartz, Howard Dietz	10:08
4.	"Mood"	Glasper	9:49
5.	"Don't Close Your Eyes"	Glasper	5:11
6.	"Blue Skies"	Irving Berlin	9:28
7.	"Interlude"	Glasper	2:15
8.	"In Passing"	Glasper	8:34
9.	"L.N.K. Blues"	Glasper	7:46
Total length:			67:51

== Personnel ==
- Bob Hurst – bass
- Damion Reid – drums
- Robert Glasper – piano
- John Ellis – saxophone (track 9)
- Marcus Strickland – saxophone (track 9)
- Bilal – vocals (tracks 1 5)
- Mike Moreno – guitar (track 4)
