= Better Angels (album) =

Studio album by Peter Bernstein
- Released: September 27, 2024
- Recorded: April 1, 2024
- Studio: Power Station Studio A (New York City)
- Genre: Jazz
- Label: Smoke Sessions

Better Angels is an album by jazz guitarist Peter Bernstein. It was recorded in 2024 and released later that year by Smoke Sessions Records.

== Background ==
Bernstein and pianist Brad Mehldau had recorded together several times previously. Bernstein was contacted by Smoke Sessions Records around three weeks before the recording, proposing to record him with Mehldau and drummer Al Foster. They added bassist Vicente Archer, who had played on Foster's previous Smoke Sessions recording.

== Music and recording ==
The album was recorded on April 1, 2024, at Studio A, Power Station, New York City. The material is a mix of standards and originals. There were no rehearsals. "No Problem" is a Latin jazz composition by Duke Jordan. As the record label intended to release an LP version of the album, Bernstein decided to record two solo tracks – one to end each side of the LP.

== Release and reception ==
Better Angels was released by Smoke Sessions Records on September 27, 2024. The Jazzwise reviewer concluded: "It's a classy, slow-cookin' record that consistently hits the spot."

== Track listing ==
1. "Perpetual Pendulum" – 6:28
2. "Ditty for Dewey" – 6:11
3. "You Go to My Head" – 6:17
4. "Born to Be Blue" – 2:54
5. "Better Angels" – 5:53
6. "Hazel Eyes" – 6:08
7. "No Problem" – 5:53
8. "Lament" – 3:47

== Personnel ==
- Peter Bernstein – guitar
- Brad Mehldau – piano
- Vicente Archer – bass
- Al Foster – drums
