= For the Roses =

Studio album by Joni Mitchell
- Released: November 1972
- Recorded: 1972
- Studio: A&M (Hollywood)
- Genres: Folk rock; soft rock; jazz
- Length: 40:20
- Label: Asylum
- Producer: Joni Mitchell

Joni Mitchell chronology
Blue (1971)	For the Roses (1972)	Court and Spark (1974)

Singles from For the Roses
- 1. "You Turn Me On, I'm a Radio" Released: October 1972; 2. "Cold Blue Steel and Sweet Fire" Released: 9 March 1973

For the Roses is the fifth studio album by the Canadian singer-songwriter Joni Mitchell. It was released in November 1972, between her two biggest commercial and critical successes—Blue and Court and Spark. In 2007 it was one of 25 recordings chosen that year by the Library of Congress to be added to the National Recording Registry.

For the Roses features the single "You Turn Me On, I'm a Radio", which Mitchell wrote sarcastically out of a record company request for a radio-friendly song. The single peaked at number 25 on the Billboard Hot 100 chart, becoming Mitchell's first top 40 hit released under her own name (as a songwriter, several other performers had had hits with songs that she had written). "Cold Blue Steel and Sweet Fire", a menacing and jazzy portrait of her then lover James Taylor's heroin addiction, which was also released as a single, backed with "Blonde in the Bleachers" and the Beethoven-inspired "Judgement of the Moon and Stars" were also popular.

== Cover art ==
While the final cover depicts a conventional picture of Mitchell in a forest setting, she originally intended for the cover to be one of her own ink-and-felt-pen drawings, titled For the Roses and featuring "a bunch of roses sticking out of a horse's ass" (the imagery of which related to her feelings on the music industry). When this was rejected by Asylum Records on the grounds that they wanted her face on the cover, Mitchell presented them with a full-rear nude photograph of herself standing on ocean rocks, and was only dissuaded after David Geffen pointed out that "she wouldn't like (an) 'Only $4.99' (sticker) slapped across her ass." The nude photograph was used for the inner gatefold of the album instead.

== Critical reception ==
Professional ratings
Retrospective reviews
Review scores
Source	Rating
AllMusic	4.5/5 stars
Christgau's Record Guide	A
Encyclopedia of Popular Music	5/5 stars
The Great Rock Discography	7/10
Music Story	5/5 stars
MusicHound Rock	4/5 stars
Pitchfork	9.1/10
The Rolling Stone Album Guide	4/5 stars
Uncut	8/10

For the Roses was met with critical acclaim. The New York Times said in 1973, "Each of Mitchell's songs on For the Roses is a gem glistening with her elegant way with language, her pointed splashes of irony and her perfect shaping of images. Never does Mitchell voice a thought or feeling commonly. She's a songwriter and singer of genius who can't help but make us feel we are not alone." Writing for Rolling Stone, Stephen Davis applauded the singer's ability to explore a variety of emotional perspectives, sometimes in the course of one song: "Her great charm and wit, her intense vocal acting and phrasing abilities (the way she chooses to deal with a single word can change the feeling of an entire song) and the sheer power and gumption of her presence combine to bring it all off and make it shine." Randall Davis from the Arcadia Tribune found it difficult to analyze but ultimately "a very nice album, pleasant to listen to and, as always with Joni, it is full of sensitive, meaningful lyrics placed against a background of light rock with folky rhythms." In The Michigan Daily, Mike Harper called it the folk rock album of the year, "deeply personal and at times self-denyingly severe", saying "this album lacks the innocence of, say, Ladies of the Canyon but what it gains in womanly heart and wisdom is unmistakably greater: sincere but moreover real, For the Roses is emotionally fulfilling in the best sense of the word."

For the Roses was named the seventh best album of 1972 in Robert Christgau's year-end list for Newsday. In his review for Creem, he said the music lacked the liveliness of Blue's "All I Want" and the lyrics' insularity diminished her voice, but he ultimately regarded the album as a "remarkable work" and the year's aesthetically boldest record. "Mitchell has integrated the strange shifts of her voice into an almost 'classical' sounding music", Christgau wrote, calling it "hypnotic when you give it a chance to work". It was voted number 148 in Colin Larkin's All Time Top 1000 Albums 3rd Edition (2000).

In 2007, the Library of Congress added the album to its National Recording Registry. In an essay accompanying the selection, Cary O'Dell wrote that the record was "Mitchell's first overt foray into jazz, a genre that, for the next several years, would come to dominate her art."

== Track listing ==
All tracks are written by Joni Mitchell.

Side one
No.	Title	Length
1.	"Banquet"	3:01
2.	"Cold Blue Steel and Sweet Fire"	4:17
3.	"Barangrill"	2:52
4.	"Lesson in Survival"	3:11
5.	"Let the Wind Carry Me"	3:56
6.	"For the Roses"	3:48
Total length:		21:05

Side two
No.	Title	Length
1.	"See You Sometime"	2:56
2.	"Electricity"	3:01
3.	"You Turn Me On, I'm a Radio"	2:39
4.	"Blonde in the Bleachers"	2:42
5.	"Woman of Heart and Mind"	2:38
6.	"Judgement of the Moon and Stars (Ludwig's Tune)"	5:19
Total length:		19:15

== Personnel ==
- Joni Mitchell – vocals, guitar, piano
- Tom Scott – woodwinds, reeds
- Wilton Felder – bass
- Russ Kunkel – drums
- Bobbye Hall – percussion
- Bobby Notkoff – strings
- James Burton – electric guitar on "Cold Blue Steel and Sweet Fire"
- Graham Nash – harmonica on "You Turn Me On I'm a Radio"
- Stephen Stills – rock and roll band on "Blonde in the Bleachers"

Technical

- Henry Lewy – sound engineer, production guidance
- Anthony Hudson – art direction, design
- Joel Bernstein – photography

== Charts ==
=== Weekly charts ===
Weekly chart performance for For the Roses
Chart (1972–1973)	Peak position
Australian Albums (Kent Music Report)	19
Canada Top Albums/CDs (RPM)	5
US Billboard 200	11
US Cash Box Top 100 Albums	9

=== Year-end charts ===
Year-end chart performance for For the Roses
Chart (1973)	Position
US Billboard 200	69

== Certifications ==
Region	Certification	Certified units/sales
United States (RIAA)	Gold	500,000^{^}
^{^} Shipments figures based on certification alone.
