= Mike Moreno =

American jazz guitarist and composer

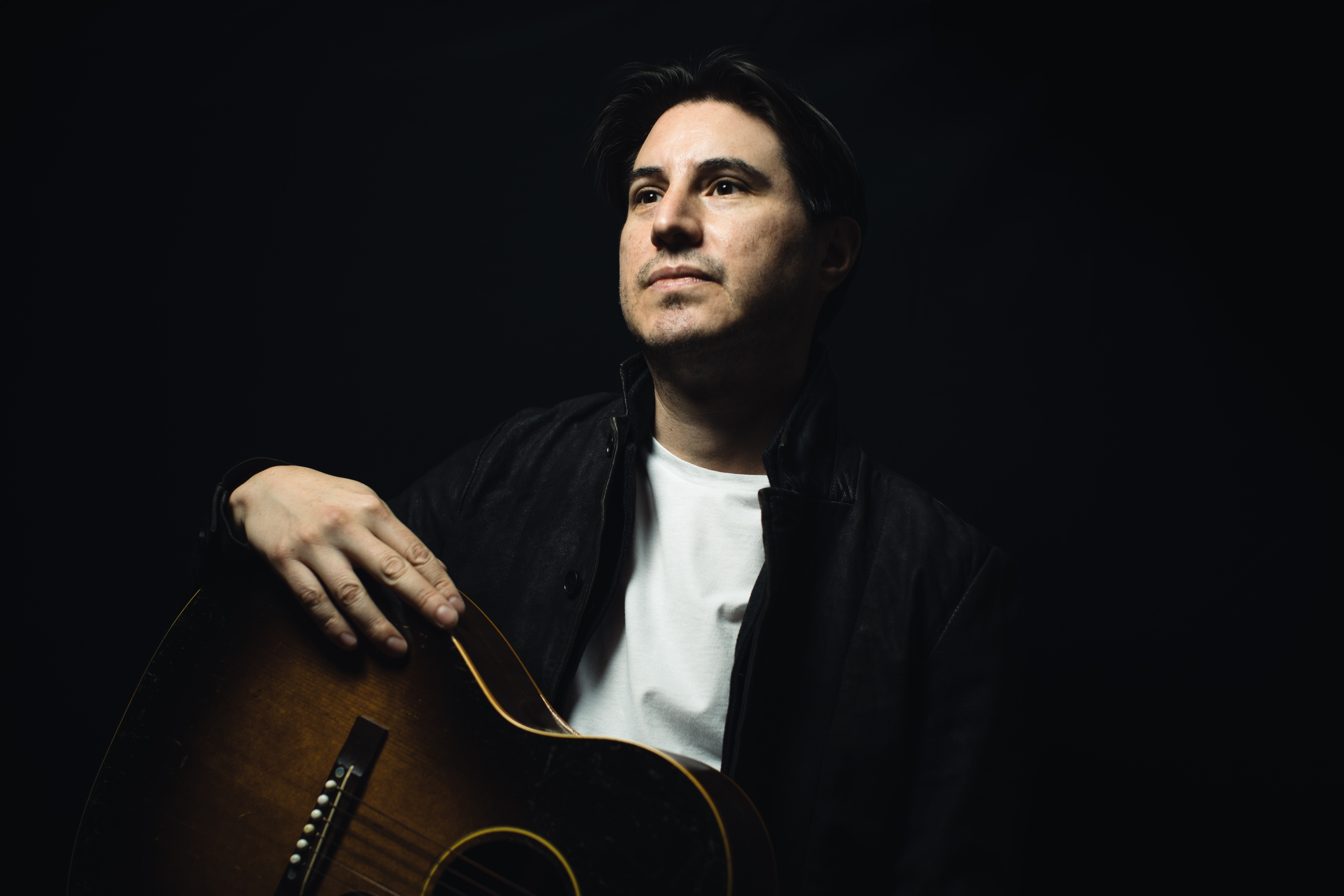

Background information
- Born: October 8, 1978 (age 47); Houston, Texas
- Genres: Jazz
- Occupations: Guitarist, composer, bandleader
- Instrument: Guitar
- Labels: World Culture, Criss Cross
- Website: www.mikemoreno.com

Mike Moreno (born October 8, 1978) is a jazz guitarist and composer from Houston, Texas.

According to an NPR interview in 2008, Moreno's main musical influences include trumpeter Freddie Hubbard, saxophonist Wayne Shorter, and pianist Herbie Hancock, as well as guitarists Pat Metheny and Bill Frisell.

== Career ==
Moreno began his musical training at the age of fifteen at the High School for the Performing and Visual Arts in Houston. In 1997, at the age 18, he moved to New York City to attend the New School for Jazz and Contemporary Music on a scholarship. Moreno has since toured and recorded extensively with many prominent musicians in jazz today, including The Joshua Redman Elastic Band, Lizz Wright Band, Nicholas Payton Quartet, Meshell Ndegeocello, The Robert Glasper Experiment, Kendrick Scott Oracle, Stefon Harris Black Out, Aaron Parks Quartet, Terence Blanchard Quintet, Melissa Aldana, Kurt Elling Weather Report Tribute Band, Greg Osby 4, Wynton Marsalis and the Jazz at Lincoln Center Orchestra, Jeff "Tain" Watts Quintet, Kenny Garrett Quintet, and Ravi Coltrane Quartet. He has also recorded and played with mainstream artists such as Bilal and Q-Tip, as well as peers John Ellis, Jeremy Pelt, and Marcus Strickland. Mike is on the Faculty at Manhattan School of Music, where he teaches a course he designed titled "Popular Songs From Film" that's based on his Patreon course Standards From Film.

As a bandleader, Moreno has released six records. These include Lotus, released December 2015, Another Way, released March 2012, and his debut album, Between The Lines, released March 2007, all through World Culture Music. Moreno's other records have been released through the Criss Cross Jazz label: First in Mind, released May 2011, Third Wish, released May 2008, and 3 for 3, released October 2017.

== Discography ==
=== As leader ===
- Between the Lines (World Culture Music, 2007)
- Third Wish (Criss Cross, 2008)
- First in Mind (Criss Cross, 2011)
- Another Way (World Culture, 2012)
- Lotus (World Culture, 2015)
- Three for Three (Criss Cross, 2017)
- Standards from Film (Criss Cross, 2022)

=== As sideman ===
With John Ellis

- By a Thread (Hyena, 2006)
- It's You I Like (Criss Cross, 2012)
- MOBRO (Parade Light, 2014)

With Kendrick Scott

- Reverence (Criss Cross, 2009)
- Conviction (Concord Jazz 2013)
- We Are the Drum (Blue Note, 2015)
- A Wall Becomes a Bridge (Blue Note, 2019)

With others

- Bilal, 1st Born Second (Interscope, 2001)
- Ralph Bowen, Total Eclipse (Posi-Tone, 2012)
- Jimmy Greene, Flowers: Beautiful Life Vol. 2 (Mack Avenue, 2017)
- Eldar Djangirov, Re-Imagination (Sony BMG, 2007)
- Armen Donelian, Leapfrog (Sunnyside, 2011)
- James Francies, Flight (Blue Note, 2018)
- Robert Glasper, Mood (Fresh Sound, 2003)
- Stefon Harris, Sonic Creed (Motema, 2018)
- Michael Janisch, Purpose Built (Whirlwind, 2009)
- Aaron Parks, Invisible Cinema (Blue Note, 2008)
- Jeremy Pelt, Profile (Fresh Sound, 2002)
- Jeremy Pelt, Identity (Maxjazz, 2005)
- Q-Tip, The Renaissance (Universal Motown, 2008)
- Bob Reynolds, Can't Wait for Perfect (Fresh Sound, 2006)
- Dayna Stephens, Reminiscent (Criss Cross, 2015)
- Logan Richardson, Cerebral Flow (Fresh Sound, 2007)
- Jochen Rueckert, Charm Offensive (Pirouet, 2016)
- Myron Walden, In This World to Feel (Demi Sound, 2010)
- Sam Yahel, Jazz Side of the Moon (Chesky, 2008)
