= Igor Lumpert =

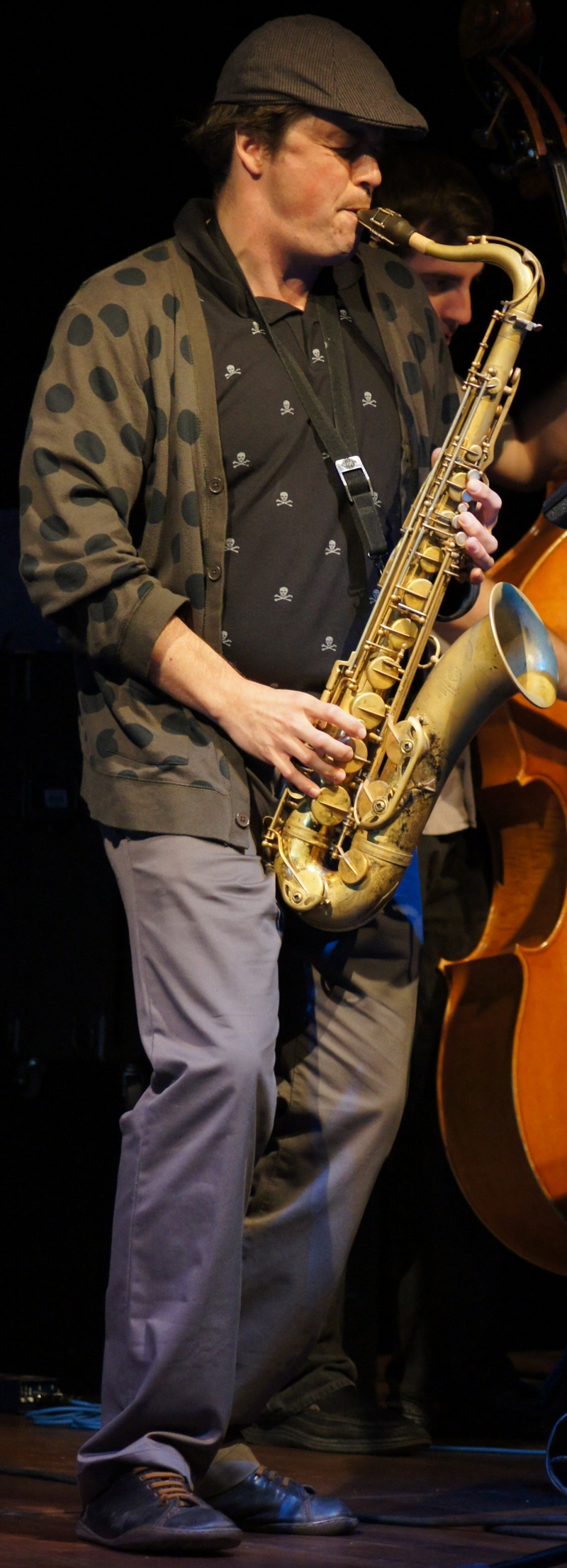
- Igor Lumpert playing saxophone

Background information
- Born: October 27, 1975 (age 50); Novo Mesto, SFR Yugoslavia
- Genres: Jazz
- Occupation: Musician
- Instrument: Saxophone
- Years active: 2000–present
- Website: igorlumpert.com

Igor Lumpert (born October 27, 1975) is a Slovene jazz saxophonist.

Lumpert began his professional training at age 19 at the Bruckner Conservatory in Linz, Austria, where he studied with Doug Hammond and Harry Sokal. During this period, he was a member of Munich-based band Sidewinders, winner of the "Best Jazz Group of Germany" award. After completing his studies with honors, Lumpert was invited by one of the world's finest bassists, Reggie Workman, to study at the New School University in New York City. He received a scholarship and moved to New York in fall 2000.

Lumpert's music spans jazz, funk, Eastern European rhythms, and modern neo-bop sketches. He has performed with jazz legends including Reggie Workman, John Abercrombie, Chico Hamilton, Sonny Simmons, Boris Kozlov, and Andy McKee.

Lumpert has performed at jazz festivals in Munich, Ljubljana, Novi Sad, the Cankar Centre in Ljubljana, at major jazz clubs in New York including the Jazz Standard, Cornelia Street Cafe, Supper Club, and Birdland and venues in Vienna, Munich, Linz, Zagreb, Belgrade, Sarajevo, Novi Sad, Athens, Crete, Venice, and Hungary.
