= Sam Sadigursky =

- Born: April 17, 1979 (age 47); Los Angeles, California
- Genres: Jazz
- Occupations: Musician, composer
- Instruments: Clarinet, saxophone
- Labels: New Amsterdam, Adhyâropa Records
- Website: www.samsadigursky.com

Sam Sadigursky (born April 17, 1979) is a clarinetist, saxophonist, flutist and composer.

== Biography ==
=== Early life ===
Sam Sadigursky (born April 17, 1979) was born and raised in Los Angeles, California. His parents are both classically trained musicians from the former Soviet Union. His father Isaac Sadigursky is an accordionist and clarinetist who later became a piano technician, and his mother Raya Sadigursky is a classical pianist and piano teacher. He played piano briefly at an early age and then began playing saxophone at the age of 11 and then clarinet at age 15. In high school, Sadigursky was the recipient of the John Coltrane Young Artist Award, the NFAA YoungArts award, the Music Center Spotlight Awards, a member of the Grammy All-American High School Big Band, and toured Japan as part of the Monterey Jazz Festival All Stars. During this time, he also performed with Brad Mehldau, Milt Hinton, Charlie Byrd and Bob Florence, and performed at Carnegie Hall as part of the JVC Jazz Festival.

Sadigursky attended William Paterson University starting in 1997 and graduated in 2001. While still in college, he recorded an album as part of the collective group Spirals, which included Jacob Sacks, Don Peretz and Eivind Opsvik, and also played on veteran Japanese clarinetist Eiji Kitamura's album Jazz Party, an album which also featured bassist Ray Brown, cornetist Bill Berry, and drummer Jake Hanna. During this time, he also toured with pianist and GRP recording artist Sergio Salvatore.

=== Career ===
Sadigursky has performed or recorded with the Mingus Orchestra, Brad Mehldau, Gabriel Kahane, Fred Hersch, Tom Jones, Darcy James Argue, Linda Oh, Anat Fort, Joe Phillips, Michael Leonhart, Red Baraat, Nico Muhly, Judd Greenstein, Jamie Baum, Ljova and Max ZT. Also prominent on the Latin music scene, he has performed with Edmar Castaneda, Lucia Pulido, Pablo Mayor's Folklore Urbano, Toto la Momposina, La Cumbiamba eNeYe, Sofia Rei, US Poet Laureate Robert Pinsky, Pedro Guirado, Emilio Teubal, Diego Obregon, Rebolu, Sebastian Cruz, and Roberto Rodriguez and the Cuban Jewish All Stars. Sadigursky is also widely known in the Reform Jewish music scene, and has played with many of the world's most noted cantors.

Since 2005, Sadigursky has been a member of Darcy James Argue's Secret Society. Their 2009 album Infernal Machines, was nominated for a Grammy award in the big band category, and was followed in 2013 by Brooklyn Babylon, which was based on the multi-media collaboration with Daniel Zezelj which debuted at Brooklyn Academy of Music, and also received a Grammy nomination. Real Enemies, released in 2016, which was also based on a multimedia show debuted at BAM, was also nominated for a Grammy in the big band category.

In 2020, Sadigursky became a member of the Philip Glass Ensemble.

He is a recipient of grants and awards from Chamber Music America, the Jerome Foundation, ASCAP, and the Puffin Foundation, and his music has been reviewed by The New York Times, JazzTimes, the Fort Worth Weekly, All About Jazz, and the Detroit Free Press. He has been a guest on WNYC's Ear to Ear, The Jazz Session, Minnesota Public Radio's The Jazz Connection, and WNYC's Soundcheck, and has performed at the Newport Jazz Festival, Kennedy Center, London Jazz Festival, Moers Festival (Germany), Radio France, Montreal Jazz Festival, Monterey Jazz Festival, BMW Jazz Festival (Brazil), Winter Jazz Fest (NYC), Jazz a Parque (Bogota, Colombia), and the Wangaratta Jazz Festival (Australia), among others.

From 2017 to 2019, he was the onstage clarinetist for the acclaimed Broadway musical The Band's Visit, which won 10 Tony Awards, the Grammy award for Cast Album of the Year, and a Daytime Emmy award for their appearance on the Today Show.

He is featured on the soundtrack to the 2004 film Seeing Other People, Clint Eastwood's Monterey Jazz Festival: 40 Legendary Years, Juan Fisher's Buscando a Miguel, the 2013 HBO documentary Six by Sondheim, the incidental music for the 2013 Broadway production of Cat on a Hot Tin Roof, Knock Down the House, Rebecca Hall's 2021 film Passing and Godfrey Reggio's Once Within a Time (2022).

=== Albums as a leader ===
Sam released his first album as a leader in 2008, The Words Project, which consists of his original musical settings of poetry, and features vocalists Monika Heidemann, Becca Stevens, Heather Masse, and Noam Weinstein, along with Sadigursky (saxophone, clarinets, and alto flute), Pete Rende (piano/Rhodes/pump organ), Nate Radley (guitar), Eivind Opsvik (bass), Tommy Crane (drums), and Robert Burkhart (cello). The album was selected as one of the top ten releases of the year by critic Steve Smith of Time Out New York, who also named it the vocal album of the year. The album features settings of poems by Osip Mandelstam, Paul Auster, Marina Tsvetaeva, Czeslaw Milosz, Penelope Shuttle, Sylvia Plath, Donald Justice, and Maxine Kumin.

Sadigursky followed this album with Words Project II in 2010, which features settings of poems and texts by Langston Hughes, Audre Lord, Sadi Ranson, Andrew Boyd, David Ignatow, Czeslaw Milosz, and Dunya Mikhail. The album features vocalists Monika Heidemann, Becca Stevens, and Wendy Gilles, along with Sadigursky (saxophone), Nate Radley (guitar/banjo), Pete Rende (piano/Rhodes/pump organ), Eivind Opsvik (bass), Bill Campbell (drums) and Richie Barshay (percussion). The cover of the album features the painting Leaping Kiss, by Chilean-born artist Pablo Campos.

In 2011, Sadigursky released Words Project III: Miniatures, which was recorded and co-produced by Michael Leonhart. Unlike Sadigursky's previous albums, which were recorded live over the course of two days each, the album was tracked individually over the course of a year, and features thick layers of voices, loops, brass, strings, percussion and various electronics. Featured vocalists include Karlie Bruce, Christine Correa, Monika Heidemann, Sunny Kim, Jamie Leonhart, Michael Leonhart, Heather Masse, Sam Sadigursky, and Roland Satterwhite. The instrumentalists include Sadigursky (woodwinds/percussion/keyboard), Michael Leonhart (trumpets/percussion/keyboards), Gary Wang (guitar/bass), Jessie Reagan (cello), Chern-Hwei Fung (violin/viola), Richie Barshay (percussion), Michael Beers (English horn), Sunny Jain (tabla), Frank Basile (baritone saxophone), Sebastian Cruz (guitar/percussion), Roland Satterwhite (violin), Andrew McKenna Lee (guitar), and Dan Loomis (bass). Amongst the featured poets are Carl Sandburg, David Ignatow, Sadi Ranson, William Carlos Williams, Maureen McLane, Michael Lally, Emily Dickinson, Kenneth Patchen, and others.

In 2013, Sadigursky followed up with Words Project IV, which solely features vocalist Christine Correa. It was recorded in France and features Sadigursky (saxophones), Laurent Coq (piano), Yoni Zelnik (bass), and Karl Jannuska (drums/percussion). It features settings of poems and words by Fernando Pessoa, Carl Sandburg, Bertold Brecht, George W. Bush, Sadi Ranson, and Spencer Reece. The cover of the album is based on a drawing by artist John Roach.

Also in 2013, Sadigursky released Crosswords:Mots Croises, which is a collaboration with Laurent Coq based on their 2009 French American Cultural Exchange grant from Chamber Music America and features dual settings of poems in both French and English. It includes the same personnel as Words Project IV, with the addition of French vocalist Laurence Allison, and is based on settings of work by William Carlos Williams, D.H. Lawrence, Blaise Cendrars and Eugène Guillevic, along with respective translations of each work. With the exception of Crosswords: Mots Croises, which was self-released, all four Words Project albums were released by New Amsterdam Records.

In 2015, he released Follow the Stick on BJU Records. The group on the album was a throwback to the instrumentation of many of the early clarinet-lead jazz groups, and featured Bobby Avey (piano), Chris Dingman (vibes/marimba), Jordan Perlson (drums), along with special guests Jason Palmer (trumpet) and Ljova (viola). The album was chosen as a Downbeat Critic's Pick and also lead to Sadigursky being named a Rising Star clarinetist in the Downbeat magazine Critics' Poll since 2016.

In 2022, he released The Solomon Diaries, a three album set of original music inspired by the dramatic rise and fall of the Borscht Belt region, which features Nathan Koci on accordion. The same year, he also released Figures/Broken Pieces, a set of 16 original piano works inspired by notable and interesting lives lost in 2020, featuring pianists Glenn Zaleski, Nick Sanders, and Dahveed Behroozi.

=== Published works ===
Sadigursky has published three books of original clarinet etudes. 25 Clarinet Etudes Book 1 was published in 2009, and then followed by 25 Clarinet Etudes Book 2 in 2011, which was followed by 10 Extended Etudes for Clarinet in 2017. Most of the etudes in Book 1 were recorded by clarinetist Marianne Gythfeldt and bass clarinetist Michael Lowenstern has recorded several of the etudes in Book 2. In 2012, he wrote 12 Intervallic Etudes for Saxophone, which is published by Delatour, France.

== Discography ==
=== As leader/co-leader ===
- Spirals with Jacob Sacks (Unleaded 1999)
- The Words Project (New Amsterdam Records 2007)
- Words Project II (New Amsterdam Records 2008)
- Words Project III - Miniatures (New Amsterdam Records 2010)
- Words Project IV (New Amsterdam Records 2013)
- Crosswords/Mots Croices - Sam Sadigursky/Laurent Coq (2013)
- Follow the Stick (BJU 2015)
- 5 Movements for Solo Clarinet (2016)
- The Solomon Diaries Vol. I-III (Adhyâropa Records 2022)
- Figures/Broken Pieces (Adhyâropa Records 2022)
