= Laurent Coq =

French jazz pianist and composer

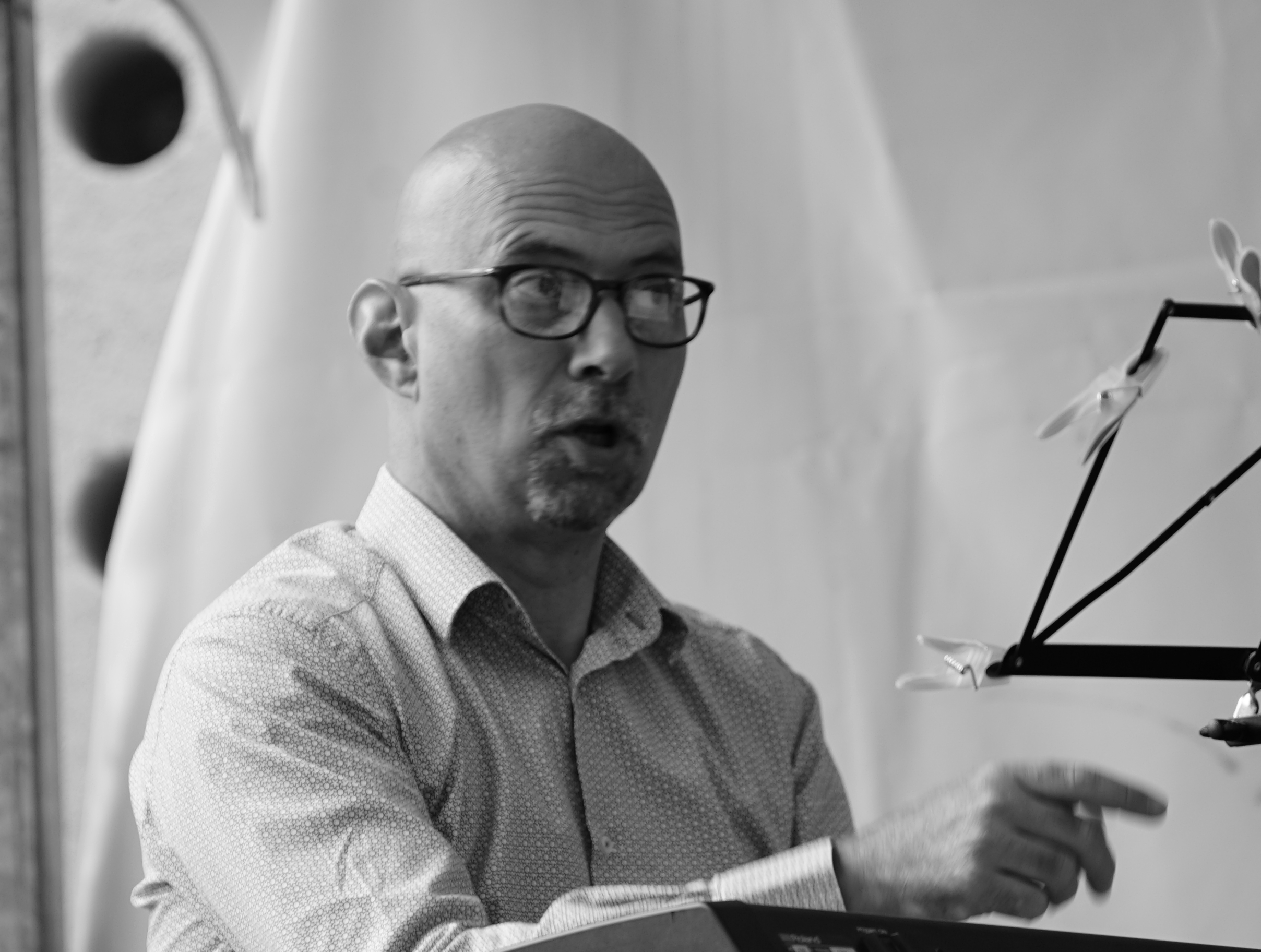

Background information
- Born: 22 February 1970 (age 55); Marseille, France
- Genres: Jazz
- Occupation: Musician
- Instrument: Piano
- Years active: 1980s–present
- Labels: Enja, Sunnyside
- Website: www.laurentcoq.com

Laurent Coq (born 22 February 1970) is a French jazz pianist and composer.

== Life and career ==
Coq began playing the piano at the age of seven. He studied at the Centre d'informations musicales in Paris, at which time he also played in a trio with bassist Jules Bikôkô bi Njami and drummer Daniel Garcia Bruno, and in a variety of other bands. Coq was awarded a government grant in 1994 to travel to the U.S., where he studied with pianists Bruce Barth, John Hicks and Mulgrew Miller.

Coq's 2011 album Rayuela, co-led with saxophonist Miguel Zenón, was inspired by Julio Cortázar's novel of the same title. The Down Beat reviewer commented that "Rayuela experiments with song structures and the connections between tunes to express emotions and motifs each artist observed by reading the [book]".

== Discography ==
An asterisk (*) indicates that the year is that of release.

=== As leader/co-leader ===
Year recorded	Title	Label	Personnel/Notes
1997	Jaywalker	Enja	Quartet, with Jean-Christophe Béney (tenor sax), Jules Bikoko bi Njami (bass), Daniel Garcia-Bruno (drums)
1999	Versatile	Cristal	Quartet, with Jean-Christophe Béney (tenor sax), Jules Bikoko bi Njami (bass), Philippe Soirat (drums)
2001	Live @ the Duc des Lombards	Cristal	Trio, with David El-Malek (tenor sax), Olivier Zanot (alto sax)
2003	Like a Tree in the City	Sunnyside	Trio, with Jérôme Sabbagh (tenor sax), Brandon Owens (bass), Damion Reid (drums)
2004	Spinnin'	Cristal	Trio, with Reuben Rogers (bass), Otis Brown III (drums)
2006	The Thing to Share	Cristal	With Olivier Zanot (alto sax), David El-Malek (tenor), Laurence Allison (vocals)
2008	Eight Fragments of Summer	88 Trees	Quartet, with Jérôme Sabbagh (tenor sax), Joe Sanders (bass), Damion Reid (drums)
2011	Rayuela	Sunnyside	Quartet, with Miguel Zenón (alto sax), Dana Leong (cello, trombone), Dan Weiss (drums, percussion)
2011	Crosswords		With Sam Sadigursky (tenor sax, soprano sax, flute), Yoni Zelnik (bass), Karl Jannuska (drums), Laurence Allison and Christine Correa (vocals)
2012	Dialogue	Sunnyside	Some tracks duo, with Ralph Lavital (guitar); some tracks trio, with Nicolas Pelage (vocals) added
