= Miles Ahead (soundtrack) =

Miles Ahead (Original Motion Picture Soundtrack)

Soundtrack album by various artists
- Released: April 1, 2016
- Genre: Jazz
- Length: 75:54
- Label: Columbia/Legacy

Robert Glasper film soundtrack chronology
Miles Ahead (Original Motion Picture Soundtrack) (2016)	The Photograph (Original Motion Picture Soundtrack) (2020)

Miles Ahead is the original motion picture soundtrack of the 2015 film of the same name. Released on April 1, 2016, the soundtrack features music by Miles Davis, Robert Glasper, and Taylor Eigsti, with dialogue tracks by Don Cheadle, Ewan McGregor, and Phil Schaap. Consisting of 24 tracks, the ranges of album's genre include jazz-instrumental, jazz-funk, trumpet jazz, modal music, hard bop, fusion and hiphop (on the closing track).

"Solea", "Seven Steps to Heaven", "Nefertiti", "Duran", "Black Satin", "Back Seat Betty", "So What", "Frelon brun", and "Go Ahead John (part two C)" are some of the most well-known songs on the album. There are four new compositions written/co-written by Glasper. The album stands as a double portrait of Davis, since the album consists of both contemporary songs of recent artists and the past original compositions of Davis. The album won the Grammy Award for "Best Compilation Soundtrack for Visual Media" at 59th Annual Grammy Awards.

== Track listing ==
No.	Title	Artist(s)	Length
1.	"Miles Ahead"	Miles Davis	4:28
2.	"Dialogue: 'It takes a long time...'"	Don Cheadle	0:05
3.	"So What"	Miles Davis	9:22
4.	"Taylor Made"	Taylor Eigsti	1:01
5.	"Dialogue: 'Listen, you talk too goddamn much...'"	Don Cheadle, Phil Schaap	0:34
6.	"Solea (Excerpt)"	Miles Davis	4:50
7.	"Seven Steps to Heaven (Edit)"	Miles Davis	3:24
8.	"Dialogue: 'If you gonna tell a story...'"	Don Cheadle	0:07
9.	"Nefertiti (Edit)"	Miles Davis	4:54
10.	"Frelon brun"	Miles Davis	5:36
11.	"Dialogue: 'Sometimes you have these thoughts...'"	Don Cheadle	0:14
12.	"Duran (Take 6 Edit)"	Miles Davis	5:35
13.	"Dialogue: 'You own my music...'"	Don Cheadle	0:07
14.	"Go Ahead John (part two C)"	Miles Davis	3:38
15.	"Black Satin (Edit)"	Miles Davis	3:11
16.	"Dialogue: 'Be musical about this shit...'"	Don Cheadle	0:07
17.	"Prelude, Pt. 2"	Miles Davis	6:34
18.	"Dialogue: 'Y'all listening to them...?'"	Don Cheadle	0:05
19.	"Junior's Jam"	Robert Glasper	3:28
20.	"Francessence"	Robert Glasper	2:08
21.	"Back Seat Betty (Excerpt)"	Miles Davis	5:31
22.	"Dialogue: 'I don't like the word jazz...'"	Don Cheadle, Ewan McGregor	0:18
23.	"What's Wrong with That?"	Robert Glasper	5:14
24.	"Gone 2015 (feat. Pharoahe Monch)"	Robert Glasper	5:30

== Tracks that appeared in the film but not on the soundtrack album ==
- "Inner Vice" – Written and performed by Robert Glasper
- "Gone" – Written by Gil Evans and performed by Miles Davis
- "Blue in Green" – Written and performed by Miles Davis
- "Sanctuary" – Written by Wayne Shorter and performed by Miles Davis
- "Teo" – Written and performed by Miles Davis
- "Moja (Part 1)" – Written and performed by Miles Davis
- "Moja (Part 2)" – Written and performed by Miles Davis
- "East of the Rockfort Rock" – Performed by Sir Coxsone Sound
- "Lowdown" – Written by Boz Scaggs and David Paich and performed by Boz Scaggs
- "Getaway" – Written by Beloyd Taylor and Peter Cor, performed by Earth, Wind & Fire
- "Blow the Horns" – Written and performed by Black Milk
