= Robert Glasper =

American jazz pianist, record producer, and songwriter

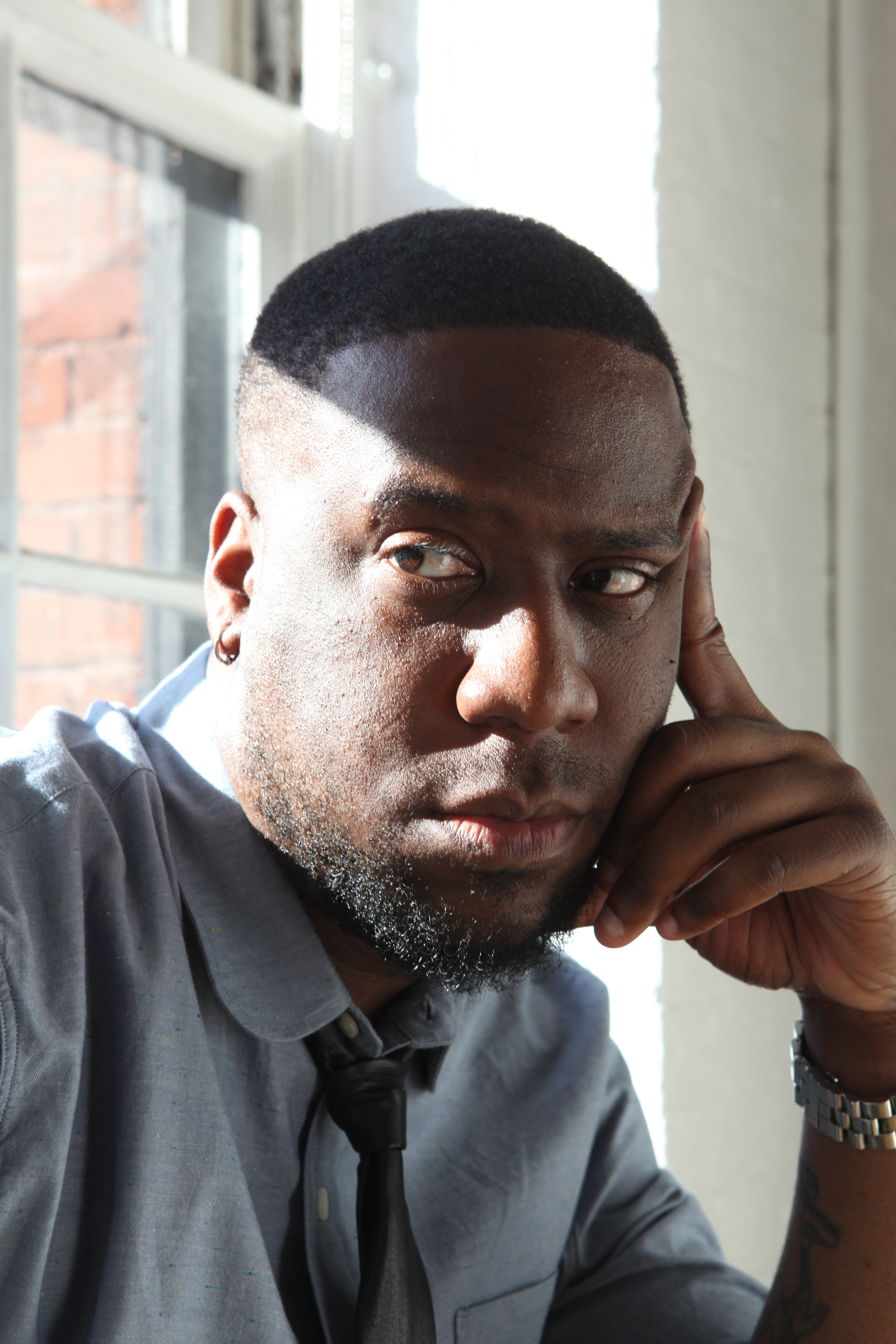
- Glasper in 2013

Background information
- Born: Robert Andre Glasper; April 5, 1978 (age 48)
- Origin: Houston, Texas, U.S.
- Education: New School for Jazz and Contemporary Music
- Genres: Jazz; hip-hop; R&B; neo soul; fusion jazz
- Occupations: Record producer; songwriter; arranger; keyboardist
- Instruments: Piano; keyboards; synthesizers
- Years active: 2003–present
- Labels: Sounds of Crenshaw; Loma Vista; Columbia; Legacy; Blue Note; Fresh Sounds
- Member of: August Greene; Robert Glasper Experiment; Dinner Party
- Website: robertglasper.com

Robert Andre Glasper (born April 5, 1978) is an American pianist, record producer, songwriter, and musical arranger. His music embodies numerous musical genres, primarily centered on jazz. Glasper has won five Grammy Awards from 11 nominations.

Glasper's breakout album, Black Radio (2012), peaked at number 15 on the Billboard 200 chart and won Best R&B Album at 55th Annual Grammy Awards. The following year, he released its sequel, Black Radio 2. In 2015, he played keyboards on Kendrick Lamar's album To Pimp a Butterfly, and appeared on the soundtrack for the 2015 drama film Miles Ahead.

Outside of his own musical work, he has co-written or produced albums for Mac Miller, Anderson .Paak, The Kid Laroi, Banks, Herbie Hancock, Big K.R.I.T., Brittany Howard, Bilal, Denzel Curry, Q-Tip, and Talib Kweli, among others. He won the 2017 Primetime Emmy Award for Outstanding Original Music and Lyrics for his song "A Letter to the Free" featured in Ava DuVernay's documentary, 13th, along with Common and Karriem Riggins. Glasper also composed the score for the documentary film The Apollo, and composed the original score for Issa Rae's The Photograph.

He has also been an Artist in Residence at venues including the London Jazz Festival, North Sea Jazz Festival, The Kennedy Center, Hollywood Bowl, Carnegie Hall, and the Blue Note Jazz Club.

== Life and career ==
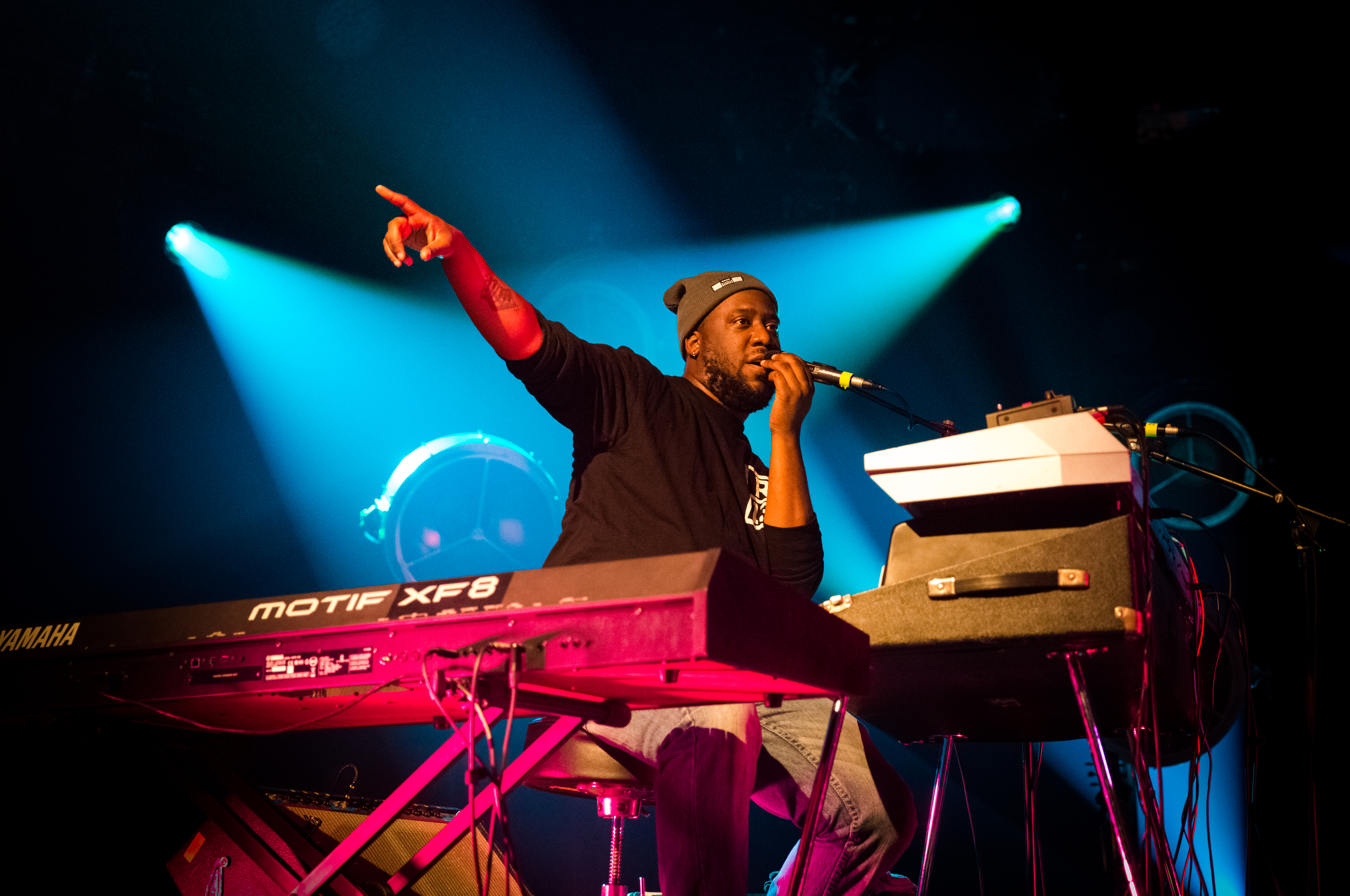
Glasper live at Leverkusener Jazztage (Germany) on November 9, 2016

=== Early life ===
Glasper's earliest musical influence was his mother, Kim Yvette Glasper, who sang jazz and blues professionally. She took her son with her to club dates rather than leave him with babysitters. She was the music director at the East Wind Baptist Church, where Glasper first performed in public. He performed during services at three churches: Baptist, Catholic, and Seventh-day Adventist. Glasper has said that he first developed his sound in church, where he learned his own way to hear harmony and was inspired to mix church and gospel harmonies with jazz harmonies.

Glasper attended Elkins High School in Missouri City, Texas, and the High School for the Performing and Visual Arts. In tenth grade he performed with the jazz band at Texas Southern University. He was in the second Vail Jazz Workshop in 1997, and went on to attend the New School for Jazz and Contemporary Music in New York City. At the New School, Glasper met neo-soul singer Bilal. They began performing and recording together, which led to associations with a variety of hip-hop and R&B artists parallel to Glasper's emerging jazz career.

According to Glasper, he became interested in hip-hop after listening to A Tribe Called Quest.

=== Career ===
Glasper's playing career was launched in earnest while still studying at The New School in New York when he started touring as a sideman with some of the established greats of the scene (bassist Christian McBride, and trumpeters Terence Blanchard and Roy Hargrove). At the same time, Robert was forging a friendship with his New School-mate Bilal, as well as a musical bond that saw them embedded in a burgeoning hip-hop and neo soul movement alongside era-defining artists such as Jill Scott, The Roots, and J Dilla—during which time Glasper became music director for Yasiin Bey (formerly Mos Def).

Glasper released his first album, Mood, in 2002 on the Fresh Sound New Talent label. Mood features six original compositions alongside versions of the jazz standards including Herbie Hancock's "Maiden Voyage". Primarily a piano trio recording, with Bob Hurst on bass and Damion Reid on drums, the album also features saxophonists Marcus Strickland and John Ellis, along with the vocalist Bilal.

Around this time, Glasper recorded with Bilal at Electric Lady Studios for the singer's unreleased but widely leaked second album, Love for Sale.

In 2005, Glasper released his debut on Blue Note Records, Canvas, with what was to become his regular piano trio lineup of Vicente Archer on bass and Damion Reid on drums. The album features nine original compositions alongside a cover of Herbie Hancock's "Riot".

His third album, In My Element, was released in 2007 and includes songs written in honor of Glasper's mother ("Tribute") and hip-hop producer J Dilla ("J Dillalude"). The pianist also revisits Hancock's "Maiden Voyage" in fusion style, moving between contemporary and classic as it segues into a version of Radiohead's "Everything in Its Right Place", and quoting Duke Ellington's "Fleurette Africaine".

Glasper's 2009 album, Double-Booked, is divided between songs performed by Glasper in an acoustic piano trio format, and his groundbreaking electric group, The Experiment, with Derrick Hodge, Casey Benjamin, and Chris Dave. The album features guest vocals and spoken-word appearances by Bilal and Yasiin Bey (formerly Mos Def). The track "All Matter", which featured Bilal, received a 2010 Grammy Award nomination for Best Urban/Alternative Performance.

In February 2012, Glasper released his fifth album Black Radio, which featured performances by a lineup of neo-soul and hip-hop artists including Lupe Fiasco, Bilal, Lalah Hathaway, Erykah Badu, and Yasiin Bey. Black Radio was met with both commercial success (a No. 10 debut on Billboard's Top Current Albums chart) and critical acclaim, with Rolling Stone declaring that it "feels like a blueprint forward", and went on to win the 2013 Grammy for best R&B album. In 2012 a concert at the Village Vanguard was recorded on video and published on YouTube. In November 2012, Black Radio Recovered: The Remix EP was released with five remixed tracks from the prior album, including remixes by Questlove, Solange, Georgia Muldrow, Pete Rock, and 9th Wonder.

In October 2013, Glasper released Black Radio 2. The core remained the Robert Glasper Experiment, featuring Glasper on keyboards, Derrick Hodge on bass, Mark Colenburg on drums, and Casey Benjamin on vocoder and saxophone. Guest vocalists included Common, Brandy, Jill Scott, Marsha Ambrosius, Anthony Hamilton, Faith Evans, Norah Jones, Snoop Dogg, Lupe Fiasco, and Emeli Sandé. Notably, Lalah Hathaway and Malcolm-Jamal Warner were featured on a cover of Stevie Wonder's "Jesus Children of America", a dedication to the victims of the Sandy Hook Elementary School shootings. The track would go on to win the Grammy for Best Traditional R&B Performance in 2015, whilst the album was nominated for Best R&B album.

On June 16, 2015, Robert Glasper released Covered, a return to his acoustic piano trio format alongside musicians Damion Reid and Vicente Archer. The album features cover songs, drawn from an eclectic variety of artists, including Radiohead, John Legend, Kendrick Lamar, and Joni Mitchell. The album was recorded live at Capitol Studios in 2014. Covered was nominated for the Grammy Award for Best Jazz Instrumental Album.

2015 saw Glasper and Lauryn Hill co-produce Nina Revisited... A Tribute to Nina Simone, an all-star tribute album pegged to the release of Liz Garbus's documentary What Happened, Miss Simone? The album features artists bringing a contemporary reimagining of Nina Simone's catalogue including contributions from Usher, Common, and Mary J. Blige.

In 2015, Glasper served as producer, composer, and arranger for the film Miles Ahead, a biopic documenting the life of jazz trumpeter Miles Davis, whom Glasper cites as being one of his major musical influences. The soundtrack primarily consists of arrangements and interpretations of some of Davis's most well-known compositions, with the exception of a few tunes written by Glasper himself, and won him the 2017 Grammy for Best Compilation Soundtrack for Visual Media.

In 2016, Glasper was able to pay further tribute to Davis, releasing Everything's Beautiful on May 27, 2016, his first with Columbia Records and Legacy Recordings. The album serves as a tribute to Davis by way of remixes and reinterpretations of several of his original works. The album debuted in the top ten Billboard Hip Hop and R&B charts, the highest Miles Davis charted according to Rolling Stone. Although Davis died in 1991, he is credited as a co-artist of the album. The album includes features from Stevie Wonder, Bilal, Illa J, Erykah Badu, Phonte, Hiatus Kaiyote, Laura Mvula, Georgia Anne Muldrow, Ledisi, and John Scofield.

September 16, 2016, marked Glasper's return to his electric group, the Robert Glasper Experiment, with the release of ArtScience: the first Experiment LP where all members write and produce, and the first with no guest vocalists, although Glasper himself sings on the album. It features saxophonist and vocalist Casey Benjamin, bassist Derrick Hodge and drummer Mark Colenburg alongside Glasper, and was recorded in New Orleans. Glasper would go on to release a remix version of the album in collaboration with Kaytranada in 2018 entitled Robert Glasper x Kaytranada: The ArtScience Remixes.

2016 saw Glasper receive attention for his prominent role on Kendrick Lamar's critically acclaimed album To Pimp a Butterfly, notably playing on the Grammy-winning track "These Walls".

In October 2016, Glasper co-hosted the inaugural Blue Note Cruise alongside Gregory Porter. The cruise became an annual event and Robert co-hosts it each year with bassist Marcus Miller.

Robert Glasper at the 2026 New York Film Festival for 14th

In January 2017, Glasper performed with Christina Aguilera at Taking the Stage, the celebratory concert commemorating the opening of the Smithsonian's new National Museum of African American History and Culture in Washington, D.C. It was hosted by Dave Chappelle and featured a plethora of other icons of black music and culture including Stevie Wonder, Mary J. Blige, Chuck D, and others. The concert was made into a feature-length program and broadcast on ABC in June 2020.

In February 2017, Glasper partnered with Afropunk as Creative and Musical Director for their special Unapologetically Black show, performed at the Apollo Theater. A celebration of African American protest music, the show featured Jill Scott, Bilal, Staceyann Chin, and Toshi Reagon alongside a special big band ensemble led by Glasper.

On September 29, 2017, Glasper released Our Point of View with the Blue Note All Stars band, for which he brought together other leading figures of his generation for a special project celebrating the legacy and future of Blue Note Records. The record featured each artist's original compositions as well as a jam session, recorded live in the studio, where the band were joined by Glasper's heroes and jazz icons Herbie Hancock and Wayne Shorter. Don Was co-produced the album with Glasper and footage of the recording session features on Sophi Huber's 2019 documentary, Blue Note Records: Behind the Notes.

In September 2017, Glasper appeared on a live stream with Esperanza Spalding while recording "Heaven in Pennies" for Spalding's album Exposure, which was released in December 2017.

In 2018, Glasper formed two new supergroups: R+R=Now with Terrace Martin, Derrick Hodge, Taylor McFerrin, Christian Scott, and Justin Tyson; and August Greene with Common and Karriem Riggins, accompanied by Burniss Travis and Samora Pinderhughes.

R+R=Now stands for Reflect+Respond=Now, a nod to Nina Simone's statement that "An artist's duty, as far as I'm concerned, is to reflect the times" and a reference to the current political climate. R+R=Now's debut album, Collagically Speaking, was released on June 15, 2018.

August Greene was formed by Glasper, Common, and Riggins after Glasper and Riggins jointly produced Common's Black America album, which included the Emmy-winning track "Letter to the Free", which featured on Ava DuVernay's documentary 13th. The group had previously performed together for a special edition of the Tiny Desk Concerts concert series at the White House in 2016, the only one done in the location. August Greene released their self-titled debut album on February 21, 2018.

In October 2018, Glasper launched the first of what would become his annual month-long residencies at the Blue Note Jazz Club. In 2018, Glasper appeared on The Potash Twins series 'Beats + Bites' (Bravo TV) along with Wynton Marsalis, Smino & Tom Colicchio.

Each year, in the course of playing 56 sold-out shows across 30 days, Glasper curates a program true to the breadth of his portfolio, vision and bandmates. Projects have included a tribute to Stevie Wonder with Luke James, a band with Yasiin Bey (formerly Mos Def) and a trio with Esperanza Spalding. Guests have ranged from Common, Black Thought, Yebba and Q-Tip to Angela Davis and Ilyasah Shabazz, Dave Chappelle and Tiffany Haddish, many of whom have made unscripted appearances performing with Glasper as well as watching the show.

In the summer of 2019, Glasper was Artist in Residence at the North Sea Jazz Festival, curating and performing over the weekend with a series of special bands and projects across the festival's stages.

In September 2019, Glasper was Artist in Residence at the John F. Kennedy Center for the Performing Arts. He commemorated the opening of their new building with a two-week series of events and outreach. On October 3, 2019, Glasper released the mixtape Fuck Yo Feelings, his first recording with Loma Vista Recordings, on the first day of his 56-show 2019 residency at the Blue Note Jazz Club. Fuck Yo Feelings is the result of a two-day session in which Glasper texted invitations to his musician friends to stop by the studio and organically create together. Featured artists, who included Herbie Hancock, Cordae, Buddy, Andra Day, Yebba, Baby Rose and Rapsody, often composed their contributions on the spot. The album's name mirrors a tattoo that Glasper got a week before recording. In 2019, Glasper appeared in Toni Thai Sterrett's "Potty Break" web series as an R&B artist named "The Hawk". Glasper closed out 2019 by composing the original music for the documentary The Apollo, which tells the story of the Harlem venue of the same name. Glasper co-wrote and performed the film's end credit song "Don't Turn Back Now" alongside Ledisi.

In 2020, Glasper wrote the score for the film The Photograph. Released on February 14, 2020, the film was directed by Stella Meghie and stars Issa Rae and Lakeith Stanfield. On June 25, 2020, Robert Glasper, Kamasi Washington, Terrace Martin, and 9th Wonder announced the formation of a supergroup, Dinner Party. They released a single, "Freeze Tag", followed by their self-titled debut album on July 10, 2020. In March 2020 March Glasper performed at the March On Washington with Derrick Hodge and George Clinton. On August 27 2020, Glasper released "Better Than I Imagined", the first single from his forthcoming Black Radio 3 album. It features H.E.R. and Meshell Ndegeocello. In August 2020, Glasper contributed to the live streamed recording of the singer Bilal's EP Voyage-19, created remotely during the COVID-19 pandemic lockdowns. It was released the following month with proceeds from its sales going to participating musicians in financial hardship from the pandemic. In September 2020, Glasper collaborated with Common to write and perform the ending theme song for the educational Netflix show Bookmarks, in which Black celebrities and artists read children's books by Black authors to spark meaningful conversations about empathy, equality, justice, self-love, and anti-racism. Presented by Marley Dias, the show features readings by Lupita Nyong'o, Jill Scott, Misty Copeland, Karamo Brown and more.

On January 14, 2022, Glasper announced on his Instagram page that on February 25 he would be releasing the third installment in his Black Radio series, entitled Black Radio III.

For the 2026 Grammy Awards, he received a nomination for the album Keys To The City Volume One in the Best Alternative Jazz Album category.

== Musical style ==
Glasper's albums are centered on his work as a solo artist, and two bands: The Robert Glasper Trio (Glasper on piano, drummer Damion Reid, and bassist Vicente Archer) as an acoustic jazz trio, and The Robert Glasper Experiment (Glasper, drummer Chris Dave, saxophonist/vocoderist Casey Benjamin and bassist Derrick Hodge) as a multi-genre electronic act. "That's what makes this band unique... We can go anywhere, literally anywhere, we want to go. We all have musical ADD and we love it." With primary influences in neo-soul, hip-hop, jazz, gospel, and R&B, Glasper also has reinterpreted songs from rock acts Nirvana, Radiohead, Soundgarden, and David Bowie. As a jazz artist, Rashod D. Ollison reviewed him after the release of Canvas as "a gifted jazz musician with a brilliant, energetic technique and a fresh, mesmerizing sense of melody and composition".

Glasper claims that the music of Miles Davis has had a significant influence on his style throughout his career as a musician. Both the soundtrack for Miles Ahead and the tribute album Everything's Beautiful are clear indications of this influence. Glasper himself said: "I'm obviously influenced by Miles Davis – even just the psyche of how he thinks about music... how he moves through, and always wanted to reflect the times he's in. That's what I'm doing now. He opened that door."

== Awards and nominations ==
Grammy Awards

| Year | Nominee / work | Award | Result |
|---|---|---|---|
| 2010 | "All Matter" (with Bilal) | Best Urban/Alternative Performance | Nominated |
| 2013 | Black Radio | Best R&B Album | Won |
| 2013 | "Gonna Be Alright (F.T.B.)" (with Ledisi) | Best R&B Performance | Nominated |
| 2015 | Black Radio 2 | Best R&B Album | Nominated |
| 2015 | "Jesus Children of America" (with Lalah Hathaway & Malcolm-Jamal Warner) | Best Traditional R&B Performance | Won |
| 2016 | Covered: Recorded Live at Capitol Records | Best Jazz Instrumental Album | Nominated |
| 2017 | Miles Ahead | Best Compilation Soundtrack for Visual Media | Won |
| 2021 | Fuck Yo Feelings | Best Progressive R&B Album | Nominated |
| 2021 | "Better Than I Imagined" (with H.E.R. & Meshell Ndegeocello) | Best R&B Song | Won |
| 2023 | Black Radio III | Best R&B Album | Won |
| 2023 | Black Radio III | Best Engineered Album, Non-Classical | Nominated |
| 2024 | "Back to Love" (with Sir & Alex Isley) | Best R&B Performance | Nominated |
| 2024 | "Back to Love" (with Sir & Alex Isley) | Best R&B Song | Nominated |

== Discography ==
=== Studio albums ===
| Year released | Year recorded | Title | Label | Notes | Chart positions |
|---|---|---|---|---|---|
| 2004 | 2002 | Mood | Fresh Sound New Talent | Most tracks trio, with Bob Hurst (bass), Damion Reid (drums); two tracks quartet, with Bilal (vocals) added; one track quintet with John Ellis (tenor sax), Mike Moreno (guitar) added; one track quintet with Ellis and Marcus Strickland (tenor sax) added | - |
| 2005 | 2005 | Canvas | Blue Note | Most tracks trio, with Vicente Archer (bass), Damion Reid (drums); two tracks quartet, with Mark Turner (tenor sax) or Bilal (vocals) added; one track quintet, with Turner and Bilal added | - |
| 2007 | 2006 | In My Element | Blue Note | Most tracks trio, with Vicente Archer (bass), Damion Reid (drums); one track with Reverend Joe Ratliff (spoken word) added | - |
| 2009 | | Double-Booked | Blue Note | Some tracks trio with Derrick Hodge (electric bass), Casey Benjamin (alto sax, vocoder); some tracks quartet, with Mos Def or Bilal (vocals) added; some tracks trio with Vicente Archer (bass), Chris Dave (drums) | - |
| 2012 | | Black Radio | Blue Note | With Casey Benjamin (vocoder, flute, sax, synthesizer), Derrick Hodge (bass), Chris Dave (drums, percussion); with Jahi Sundance (turntables) added on some tracks; plus various featured artists | US No. 15, UK No. 81 |
| 2013 | | Black Radio 2 | Blue Note | With Casey Benjamin (sax, synthesizer, vocoder), Derrick Hodge (bass) Mark Colenburg (drums, percussion); plus various featured artists | US No. 16, UK No. 86 |
| 2015 | 2014 | Covered | Blue Note | Most tracks trio, with Vicente Archer (bass), Damion Reid (drums); plus various featured artists | US No. 190 |
| 2016 | | Everything's Beautiful | Columbia/Legacy | uses samples of Miles Davis | US No. 152 |
| 2016 | | ArtScience | Blue Note | | US No. 129 |
| 2019 | | Fuck Yo Feelings | Loma Vista Recordings | With Chris Dave (drums), Derrick Hodge (bass), Affion Crockett, Buddy, Denzel Curry, Terrace Martin, James Poyser, YBN Cordae, Bilal, Herbie Hancock, Mick Jenkins, Yebba, Andra Day, Staceyann Chin, Baby Rose, Rapsody, SIR, B Kelly, Song Bird, Muhsinah, Queen Sheba, Yasiin Bey. | - |
| 2022 | | Black Radio III | Loma Vista Recordings | With featured vocals by Amir Sulaiman, Killer Mike, BJ the Chicago Kid, Big K.R.I.T., D Smoke, Tiffany Gouché, Q-Tip, Esperanza Spalding, Yebba, H.E.R., Meshell Ndegeocello, Lalah Hathaway, Common, Musiq Soulchild, Posdnuos, Gregory Porter, Ledisi, Ant Clemons, Jennifer Hudson, PJ Morton, Ty Dolla Sign, India Arie | - |
| 2024 | | Let Go | Loma Vista Recordings | Initially released in an exclusive streaming partnership coinciding with Apple Music's Black Music Month. Featuring Meshell Ndegeocello; with Kendrick Scott (drums), bassist Burniss Travis (bass), and Chris Sholar (guitar). | - |
| 2025 | | Code Derivation | Loma Vista Recordings | Featuring instrumentalists Walter Smith III, Mike Moreno, Kendrick Scott, Vicente Archer, Keyon Harrold and an additional feature from Marcus Strickland, along with producers Riley Glasper, MMYYKK, Hi-Tek, Black Milk, Taylor McFerrin and Karriem Riggins. . | - |
| 2025 | | Keys To The City Volume One | Loma Vista Recordings | Featuring Black Thought, Thundercat, Norah Jones, Meshell Ndegeocello, Esperanza Spalding, T3, Bilal, and Yebba. | - |

=== EPs ===
- Black Radio Recovered: The Remix EP (Blue Note, 2012)
- Porter Chops Glasper (Blue Note, February 25, 2014)
- Dinner Party, with Terrace Martin, Kamasi Washington and 9th Wonder (Sounds of Crenshaw/Empire, July 10, 2020)
- Enigmatic Society, with Terrace Martin, Kamasi Washington and 9th Wonder (Sounds of Crenshaw/Empire, April 14, 2023)
- In December, with PJ Morton, Sevyn Streeter, Cynthia Erivo, Tarriona "Tank" Ball, Alex Isley, Andra Day, and The Baylor Project. The seven-track EP was available to stream on Apple Music in November 2023 and released on vinyl by Loma Vista a year later.

=== Soundtracks ===
- Miles Ahead: Original Motion Picture Soundtrack (Columbia/Legacy, 2015)
- The Photograph: Original Motion Picture Soundtrack (Back Lot Music, 2020)
- Miles & Juliette (TBA)

=== With R+R=Now ===
- Collagically Speaking (Blue Note, 2018)
