= Darcy James Argue =

Canadian jazz composer and bandleader (born 1975)

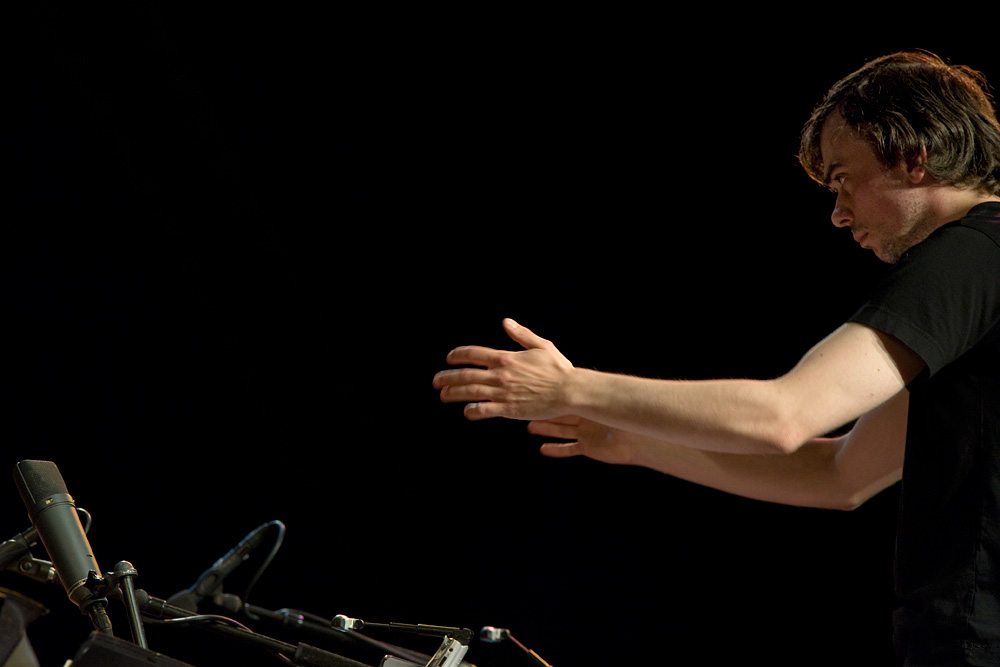
- Argue at the Moers Festival, 2009

Background information
- Born: May 23, 1975 (age 51); Vancouver, British Columbia, Canada
- Genres: Jazz
- Occupations: Musician, composer, bandleader
- Instrument: Piano
- Years active: 2005–present
- Label: New Amsterdam
- Member of: Darcy James Argue's Secret Society
- Website: secretsocietymusic.org

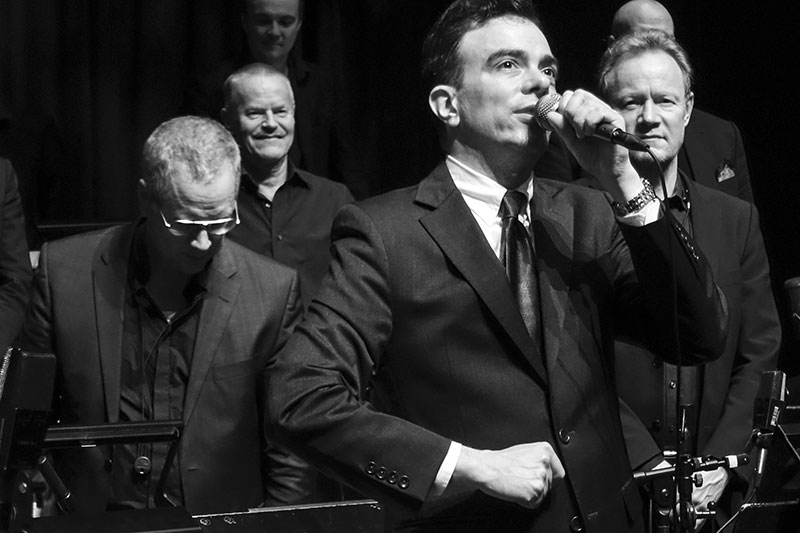
Darcy James Argue and the Danish Radio Big Band (2016)

Darcy James Argue (born May 23, 1975) is a jazz composer and bandleader known for his work with his 18-piece ensemble, Secret Society.

== Biography ==
Argue was born in Vancouver, British Columbia. He studied at McGill University in Montreal from 1993–1998, and in 2000 he moved to the U.S. to study composition at New England Conservatory of Music with jazz composer Bob Brookmeyer. Following his studies at New England Conservatory, Argue moved to Brooklyn in 2003.

== Secret Society ==
In 2005, Argue founded Darcy James Argue's Secret Society, an 18-piece big band. In 2009, they released their first studio album, Infernal Machines, on New Amsterdam Records, an independent record label in New York City. It received a Grammy Award nomination for Best Large Jazz Ensemble Album and a Juno Award nomination in Canada for Contemporary Jazz Album of the Year. It was recognized multiple times in the Down Beat magazine Critics' Poll and included on annual lists at The New York Times, NPR, The Wall Street Journal, Paste, and the Ottawa Citizen.

The Society's second album, Brooklyn Babylon (2013), was based on a multimedia performance created with visual artist Danijel Zezelj and premiered at the BAM Next Wave Festival in November 2011. It too received Grammy and Juno Award nominations. It won the top positions for Arranger and Big Band in the 2013 Down Beat Critics' Poll, was named Best Album of 2013 by The New Republic, and was included in the Top 10 Albums of the 2013 NPR Music Jazz Critics' Poll.

Their third album, Real Enemies (New Amsterdam, 2016) was commissioned by and premiered at the BAM Next Wave Festival. Like Brooklyn Babylon, it was created as part of a multimedia performance, in partnership with the writer-director Isaac Butler and the theatrical film designer Peter Nigrini. It received a Grammy nomination for Best Large Jazz Ensemble Album.

In September 2023, the Society released their fourth album, Dynamic Maximum Tension, on Nonesuch Records. It received the group's fourth Grammy nomination for Best Large Jazz Ensemble Album.

== Commissions ==
Argue has received commissions from the Fromm Music Foundation, the Jazz Gallery, the Manhattan New Music Project, the Jerome Foundation, and Brooklyn Academy of Music, as well as ensembles including the Danish Radio Big Band, the Hard Rubber Orchestra, the Jazz Knights, and the Orquestra Jazz de Matosinhos. He is the recipient of grants and fellowships from New Music USA, the Aaron Copland Fund for Music, the Mid Atlantic Arts Foundation, the Canada Council for the Arts, and the MacDowell Colony.

== Awards and honors ==
- Charlie Parker Composition Prize, BMI Jazz Composers' Workshop (2004)
- Grammy Award nominations, Best Large Jazz Ensemble Album: Infernal Machines (2011), Brooklyn Babylon (2014), Real Enemies (2016), Dynamic Maximum Tension (2023)
- Juno Award nomination, Contemporary Jazz Album of the Year (2010, 2014)
- Music Fellowship, New York Foundation for the Arts (2013)
- Doris Duke Performing Artist Award (2015)
- Guggenheim Fellowship in Music Composition (2015)

== Discography ==
- Infernal Machines (New Amsterdam, 2009)
- Brooklyn Babylon (New Amsterdam, 2013)
- Real Enemies (New Amsterdam, 2016)
- Dynamic Maximum Tension (Nonesuch, 2023)
