= Vicente Archer =

American jazz bassist, composer, and bandleader

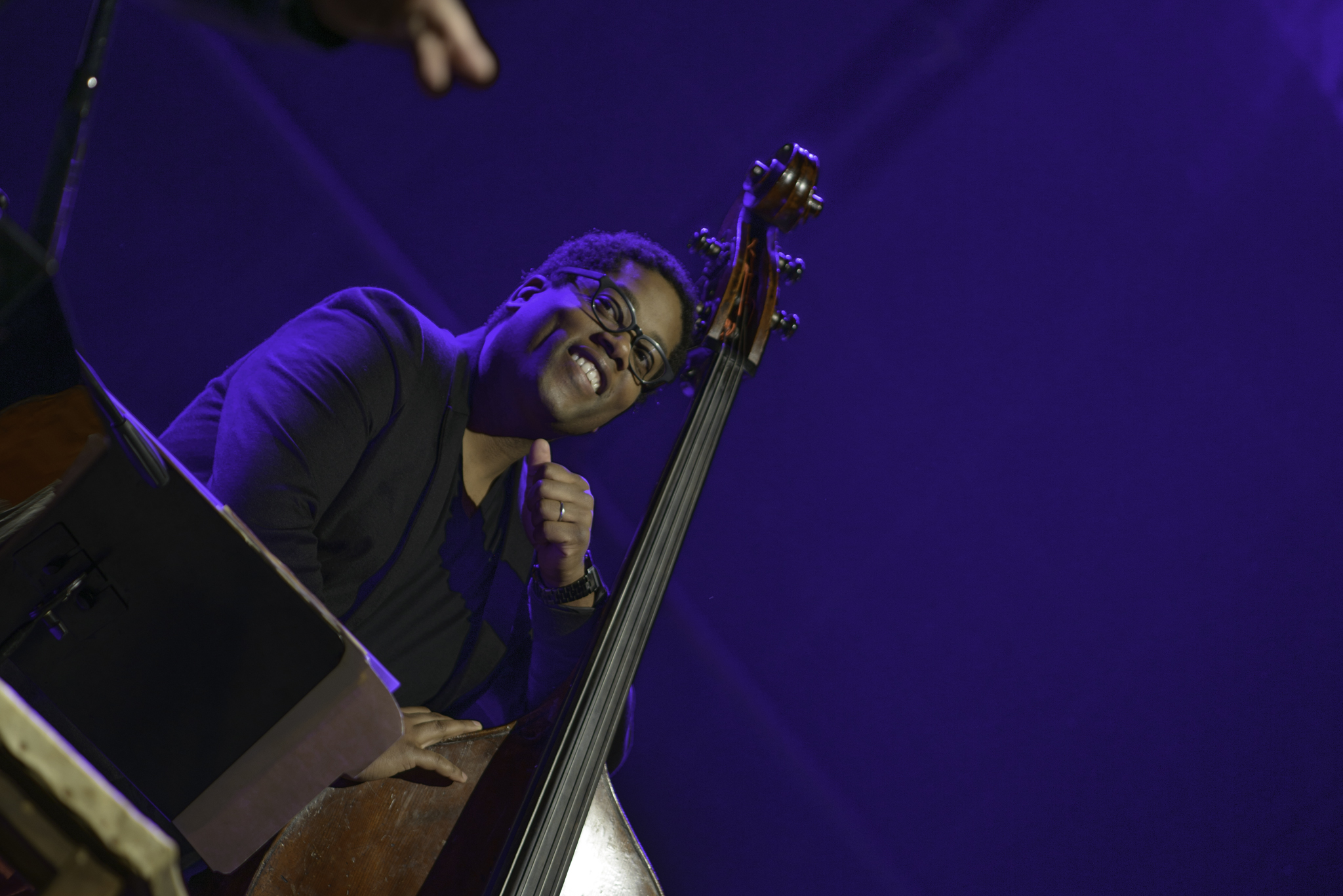
- Archer at the 18th Punta del Este International Jazz Festival, Uruguay, 2014

Background information
- Born: Woodstock, New York, U.S.
- Genres: Jazz; hip-hop; folk
- Occupations: Musician; composer; bandleader
- Instrument: Double bass
- Years active: 2000s–present

Vicente Archer (born in Woodstock, New York) is an American jazz bassist, composer, and bandleader. He has performed with John Scofield, Nicholas Payton, Robert Glasper, Norah Jones, Amos Lee, and many others, and has appeared on five Grammy-nominated and two Grammy-winning recordings.

== Biography ==
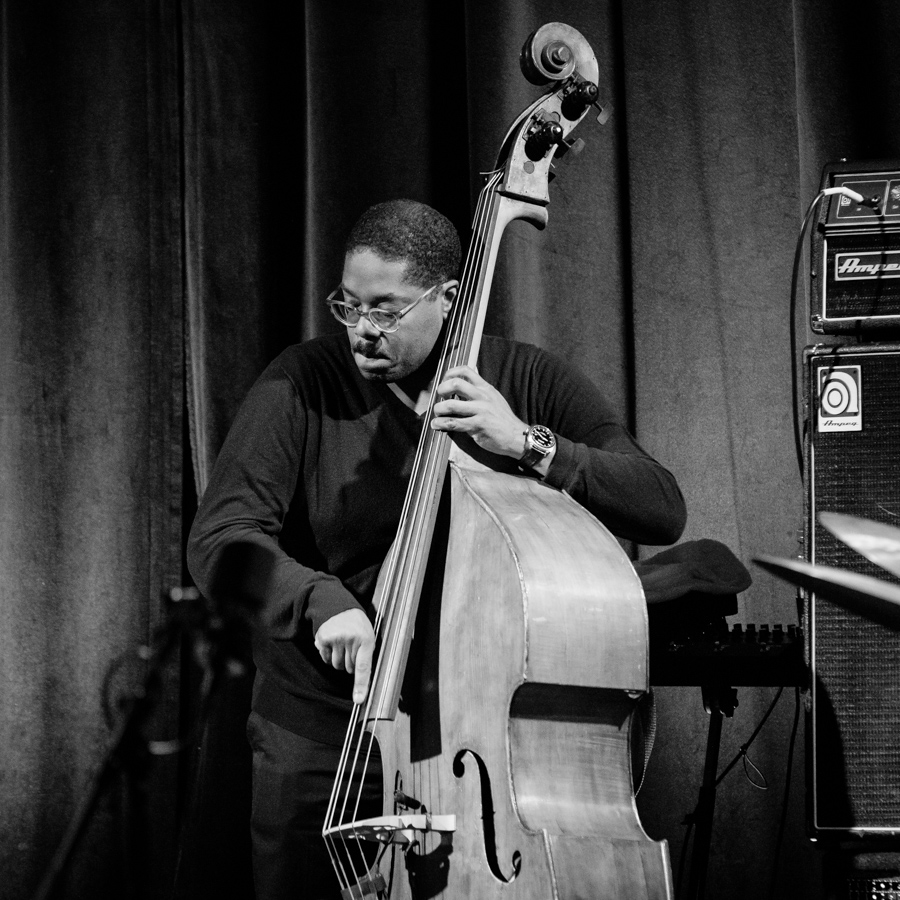
Archer at Nasjonal Jazzscene, Victoria Teater, Oslo, 2019

From Woodstock, New York, Archer absorbed much of the historical town's arts culture, his music ranging from folk to jazz to hip-hop. He attended New England Conservatory of Music and Northeastern University in Boston, where he earned a degree in business. While in college, he picked up the double bass with swiftness. Within eight months, he was asked by alto saxophonist Donald Harrison to join his group. Archer's first recording appearance is on Harrison's Impulse! album Free to Be. Soon after, he began recording and performing with Pat Metheny, Common, Norah Jones, Jill Scott, H.E.R., Terence Blanchard, Mary J. Blige, Freddie Hubbard, Brad Mehldau, Wynton Marsalis, Amos Lee, Kenny Garrett, Willie Nelson, among others. Currently, he is one of the most sought bassist of his generation, appearing on over 150 records and is touring with Grammy award winning artists Robert Glasper, Nicholas Payton, and John Scofield.

== Discography ==
- Bruce Barth Trio, Live at Smalls (SmallsLIVE, 2011) – with Rudy Royston
- John Scofield, Combo 66 (Verve, 2018)
- Peter Bernstein, Better Angels (Smoke Sessions, 2024)
- Black Art Jazz Collective: Presented by the Side Door Jazz Club (Sunnyside Records, 2016) – with Jeremy Pelt, Wayne Escoffery, Xavier Davis, James Burton III, and Johnathan Blake
