= Everything's Beautiful =

2016 studio album by Robert Glasper and Miles Davis

Studio album by Robert Glasper and Miles Davis
- Released: May 27, 2016
- Studios: Brooklyn Recording (Brooklyn, New York); Thingamajig Lab 2 (Brooklyn); Anu It! Studio (Harlem, New York); KING Creative Studios (Los Angeles, California); Westlake Recording Studios (Los Angeles); Wonderland Studios (Los Angeles); Brightlady Studios (Raleigh, North Carolina); The Peanut Gallery (Raleigh); Klearlight Studio (Dallas, Texas); Precious House Studios (Dallas); State of the Ark (London); Willow Grove Studio (Australia)
- Genres: Alternative R&B; alternative hip hop
- Length: 46:57
- Labels: Blue Note; Legacy; Columbia
- Producers: Robert Glasper; Jewels; Rashad Smith; Erykah Badu; 9th Wonder; Hiatus Kaiyote; Paris Strother; Georgia Anne Muldrow; Anu~Sun; Black Milk; DJ Spinna

Robert Glasper chronology
Covered: Recorded Live at Capitol Records (2015)	Everything's Beautiful (2016)	ArtScience (2016)

Everything's Beautiful is an album by American musician Robert Glasper based on Miles Davis' samples. It was released on May 27, 2016, jointly through Blue Note and Legacy/Columbia Records.

== Background ==
Recording sessions took place at Anu It! Studio, Brooklyn Recording and the Thingamajig Lab 2 in New York, Klearlight Studios and Precious House Studios in Dallas, the Peanut Gallery and Brightlady Studios in Raleigh, Willow Grove Studios in Australia, State of the Ark in London, King Creative Studios and Wonderland Studios in Los Angeles, with additional recording at Westlake Recording Studios. Production was handled by Robert Glasper, Jewels, Rashad Smith, 9th Wonder, Paris Strother, Anu~Sun, Black Milk, DJ Spinna, and Steve Berkowitz. Erykah Badu, Georgia Anne Muldrow, Phonte and Hiatus Kaiyote co-produced the tracks they were featured on. Other guest appearances came from Bilal, Illa J, Laura Mvula, Ledisi, Stevie Wonder and We Are King, as well as contributions from bassists Derrick Hodge, Braylon Lacy and Burniss Travis, guitarists Danny Leznoff, Kyle Bolden and John Scofield, as well as saxophonist Lakecia Benjamin and harpist Brandee Younger. Adam Block, Erin Davis, Nicole Hegeman and Vince Wilburn Jr. executive produced the album.

In the United States, the album peaked at number 152 on the Billboard 200, at number-one on both the Top Contemporary Jazz Albums and Jazz Albums, at number five on the Top R&B Albums, at number 10 on the Top R&B/Hip-Hop Albums, and at number 17 on the Tastemakers. It also reached number 50 in Switzerland, number 85 in the Netherlands, number 94 in Germany, number 178 in France, and number 44 and number 118 in Flanders and Wallonia (Belgium) respectively.

== Critical reception ==
Professional ratings
Aggregate scores
Source	Rating
Metacritic	73/100
Review scores
Source	Rating
AllMusic	3.5/5 stars
Exclaim!	9/10
Jazz Forum	4/5 stars
Pitchfork	7.4/10
PopMatters	8/10
Rolling Stone	3.5/5 stars
The Spill Magazine	3/5
The Independent	4/5
The Times	3/5 stars
Tom Hull	B+

Everything's Beautiful was met with generally favorable reviews from music critics. At Metacritic, which assigns a normalized rating out of 100 to reviews from mainstream publications, the album received an average score of 73 based on eleven reviews.

Matt Bauer of Exclaim! gave the album 9 out of 10 stating: "Everything's Beautiful, indeed". Emmanuel Elone of PopMatters found the album "is not the real tribute; it's Glasper's determination to evolve the genre that is, and I don't think Miles Davis would have it any other way". Andy Gill of The Independent wrote: "Erykah Badu lends a childlike charm to the sunburnt fizz of Glasper's bossa nova version of "Maiysha (So Long)", with Miles's trumpet shining through towards the end". Seth Colter Walls of Pitchfork wrote: "a trio of cuts toward the middle of Everything's Beautiful suffers from feeling less robustly reimagined than the rest of the set--placing a slight drag on momentum". AllMusic's Andy Kellman wrote: "considering the disparate source material and the quantity of vocalists, instrumentalists, and producers involved, it's remarkable how smoothly the album flows from one track to the next. Unsurprisingly, it's most appealing to fans of Glasper and those he involved". Greg Tate of Rolling Stone stated: "Glasper and his confreres have used Davis' inspiration to craft a moving and misterioso assemblage that, true-to-the-living Davis, refuses any scent of museum entombment".

In mixed reviews, The Wire critic suggested: "Glasper is undoubtedly a class act, but the lacks the wildness a Madlib or a Flying Lotus might have brought to this project". Mojo reviewer clared: "smooth soul or hip hop tropes being largely the order of the day here". Siddhartha Mitter of The Boston Globe wrote: "the middle of the album is a problem, especially the Hiatus Kaiyote number, "Little Church", a strange, bloodless clunker that drags down the Mvula ("Silence Is the Way") and KING ("Song for Selim") features that follow. The Badu track, the electro-bossa nova "Maiysha (So Long)", is fine but familiar. Miles Davis concept aside, Glasper's still in Black Radio mode. It works, but it needs a little dirt, and probably a new challenge". Mark Streeter of Now wrote: "in a way, this could be Glasper's Black Radio Volume 3: The Davis Edition. However, positioning the album as a tribute runs counter to his forward-looking use of the material".

== Track listing ==
Everything's Beautiful track listing
No.	Title	Writer(s)	Producer(s)	Length
1.	"Talking Shit"	Robert Glasper; Curtis Jews; Josef Zawinul; Miles Davis	Robert Glasper; Jewels	3:09
2.	"Ghetto Walkin'" (featuring Bilal)	Bilal Oliver; Glasper; Davis	Robert Glasper; Jewels	3:42
3.	"They Can't Hold Me Down" (featuring Illa J)	John Derek Yancey; Glasper; Davis	Robert Glasper; Rashad Smith	2:14
4.	"Maiysha (So Long)" (featuring Erykah Badu)	Erica Wright; Davis	Robert Glasper; Rashad Smith; Erykah Badu	7:29
5.	"Violets" (featuring Phonte)	Phonte Coleman; Glasper; Davis	9th Wonder	3:23
6.	"Little Church" (featuring Hiatus Kaiyote)	Hermeto Pascoal; Davis	Hiatus Kaiyote	6:35
7.	"Silence Is the Way" (featuring Laura Mvula)	Laura Pauline Amanda Douglas; Zawinul; Davis	Robert Glasper; Jewels	5:17
8.	"Song for Selim" (featuring King)	Paris Strother; Amber Strother; Anita Bias; Davis	Paris Strother	2:39
9.	"Milestones" (featuring Georgia Anne Muldrow)	Davis	Georgia Anne Muldrow	4:16
10.	"I'm Leaving You" (featuring Ledisi)	Ledisi Anibade Young; Glasper; Davis	Robert Glasper; Anu~Sun; Black Milk; Steve Berkowitz	3:13
11.	"Right on Brotha"	Christopher Robinson; Vincent Williams; Wayne Shorter; Davis	DJ Spinna; Chris Rob (co.)	5:00
Total length:				46:57

== Credits ==
For producers and featured vocalists see track listing above.

1. mixed by Anu~Sun at Anu It! Studio, Harlem; Derrick Hodge: bass; contains samples of Miles Davis' voice from the Jack Johnson sessions, Nefertiti, the In a Silent Way sessions and Joe Zawinul's piano from the In a Silent Way sessions
2. recorded & mixed by Anu~Sun at Anu It! Studio; Robert Glasper: keyboards, Derrick Hodge: bass; contains a sample of "The Ghetto Walk" written by Miles Davis, as performed by Miles Davis
3. recorded by James Benjamin, mixed by Anu~Sun; Robert Glasper: keyboards, Danny Leznoff: guitar, Derrick Hodge: bass
4. recorded by Jimi Bowman, mixing by Chris Tabron (assisted by Caleb Laven); Robert Glasper: keyboards, percussion, Braylon Lacy: bass, Erykah Badu and Rashad "Ringo" Smith: percussion; contains a sample of "Maiysha" written by Miles Davis, as performed by Miles Davis
5. recording by 9th Wonder, Phonte Coleman and Bianca Rodriguez, Burniss Travis: bass, Bianca Rodriguez: additional backing vocals; contains a sample from Kind of Blue
6. recorded & mixed by Hiatus Kaiyote at Willow Grove Studios in Australia; contains a sample of "Blue in Green" written by Miles Davis, as performed by Miles Davis
7. recorded & mixed by Jewels; Robert Glasper: piano; contains a sample of "In a Silent Way" written by Josef Zawinul, as performed by Miles Davis
8. recorded and mixd by Paris Strother; Kyle Bolden: guitar; contains a sample of "Selim" written by Miles Davis, as performed by Miles Davis
9. recorded & mixed by Georgia Anne Muldrow; Robert Glasper: piano
10. recorded by Andy Taub at Brooklyn Recording, Brooklyn, recorded and mixed by Anu~Sun at Anu It! Studio; John Scofield: guitar, Burniss Travis: bass; contains a sample of music and Miles Davis talking from Jack Johnson sessions
11. recorded by Femi Jiya, mixed by Chris Tabron (assisted by Caleb Laven), Cristian F. Perez: Pro Tools; Chris Rob: piano, Fender Rhodes, synthesizer, Lakecia Benjamin: alto and tenor saxophone, Brandee Younger: harp, Stevie Wonder: harmonica, DJ Spinna: drum programming, percussion; contains a sample of "Right Off" written by Miles Davis, as performed by Miles Davis, and an interpolation of "Nefertiti" written by Wayne Shorter

=== Production ===
- Qmillion – additional recording at Westlake Recording Studios, Los Angeles
- Robert Glasper – liner notes
- Adam Block, Erin Davis, Nicole Hegeman and Vincent Wilburn Jr. – executive producers
- Steve Berkowitz – executive producer (track 10)
- Frank Harkins – art direction
- Alice Butts – design
- Francine Turk – cover design
- Jim Lane and Tara Master – project management and direction

== Charts ==
Chart performance for Everything's Beautiful
Chart (2016)	Peak position
Belgian Albums (Ultratop Flanders)	44
Belgian Albums (Ultratop Wallonia)	118
Dutch Albums (Album Top 100)	85
French Albums (SNEP)	178
German Albums (Offizielle Top 100)	94
Swiss Albums (Schweizer Hitparade)	50
US Billboard 200	152
US Top Contemporary Jazz Albums (Billboard)	1
US Top Jazz Albums (Billboard)	1
US Indie Store Album Sales (Billboard)	17
US Top R&B Albums (Billboard)	5
US Top R&B/Hip-Hop Albums (Billboard)	10
