= ArtScience =

Studio album by Robert Glasper Experiment
- Released: September 16, 2016
- Studio: The Parior Recording Studio (New Orleans, Louisiana)
- Genre: Alternative R&B; jazz-funk
- Length: 70:34
- Label: Blue Note
- Producer: Casey Benjamin; Derrick Hodge; Mark Colenburg; Robert Glasper

Robert Glasper chronology
| Everything's Beautiful (2016) | ArtScience (2016) | Fuck Yo Feelings (2019) |

ArtScience is a studio album by American musician Robert Glasper. It was released on September 16, 2016, via Blue Note Records, his last one with that music label. Recording sessions took place at the Parior Recording Studio in New Orleans. Production was handled by Casey Benjamin, Derrick Hodge, Mark Colenburg and Glasper himself. It features contributions from Jahi Sundance on turntables and Mike Severson on guitar. The album peaked at number 129 on the US Billboard 200 albums chart.

== Critical reception ==
Professional ratings
Aggregate scores
| Source | Rating |
|---|---|
| Metacritic | 78/100 |
Review scores
| Source | Rating |
| AllMusic | 4/5 stars |
| Exclaim! | 8/10 |
| Pitchfork | 7.6/10 |
| PopMatters | 7/10 |
| The Guardian | 4/5 stars |
| Tom Hull | B+ |

ArtScience was met with generally favorable reviews from music critics. At Metacritic, which assigns a normalized rating out of 100 to reviews from mainstream publications, the album received an average score of 78 based on eight reviews.

AllMusic's Thom Jurek praised the album, stating that it is an "excellent step forward". Ryan B. Patrick of Exclaim! wrote: "at this point, Glasper, along with bassist Derrick Hodge, saxophonist Casey Benjamin, and drummer Mark Colenburg, are a well-oiled musical machine. As the Robert Glasper Experience, the quartet embrace jazz as they steer the genre into exciting directions". John Fordham of The Guardian wrote: "Glasper has signaled an impatience with jazz on earlier Experiment ventures, but very definitely not on this one". Marcus J. Moore of Pitchfork found the album "the Robert Glasper Experiment's most realized effort, mainly because they've stopped relying on outside talent to get their point across. They've created their own vibe, one that needed their own voices to truly resonate". Adriane Pontecorvo of PopMatters wrote: "an ingenious blend of soulful tunes and undeniable technique, ArtScience signals a bright, self-reliant future for the Robert Glasper Experiment".

== Track listing ==
| No. | Title | Writer(s) | Length |
|---|---|---|---|
| 1. | "This Is Not Fear" | Robert Glasper; Casey Benjamin; Mark Colenburg | 3:18 |
| 2. | "Thinkin Bout You" | Glasper; Derrick Hodge; Muhammad Ayers | 3:12 |
| 3. | "Day to Day" | Benjamin | 5:24 |
| 4. | "No One Like You" | Glasper; Benjamin | 9:18 |
| 5. | "You and Me" | Glasper; Benjamin; Colenburg; Hodge | 4:38 |
| 6. | "Tell Me a Bedtime Story" | Herbie Hancock | 7:05 |
| 7. | "Find You" | Glasper; Benjamin; Colenburg; Hodge | 6:46 |
| 8. | "In My Mind" | Glasper; Colenburg | 6:07 |
| 9. | "Hurry Slowly" | Benjamin | 5:36 |
| 10. | "Written in Stone" | Glasper; Benjamin; Jahi Lake; Ryan Coleman | 5:01 |
| 11. | "Let's Fall in Love" | Glasper; Aaliyah Niambi; Matthew Vorzimer | 7:33 |
| 12. | "Human" | Terry Lewis; James Harris III | 6:36 |
| Total length: | | | 1:10:34 |

== Personnel ==
- Robert Glasper – keyboards (tracks: 1, 2, 4, 5, 7, 8, 10–12), piano (tracks: 1, 3–5, 7–12), Rhodes organ (tracks: 1, 3–9, 11, 12), vocals (tracks: 2, 11), producer
- Casey Benjamin – vocals (tracks: 1, 3–6, 9, 10, 12), keyboards (tracks: 1, 2, 3, 5, 7, 9, 11, 12), alto saxophone (tracks: 1, 8, 9), vocoder (tracks: 4–6, 12), soprano saxophone (tracks: 4, 6, 9), backing vocals (track 7), producer
- Derrick Hodge – bass, vocals (tracks: 1, 7), producer
- Mark Colenburg – drums, vocals (track 1), percussion (tracks: 2, 3, 7), producer
- Jahi Sundance – turntables (tracks: 1, 11), whistle (track 10)
- Mike Severson – guitar (tracks: 4, 7, 9)
- Riley Glasper – vocals (track 7)
- Keith Lewis – engineering

== Charts ==
Chart performance for ArtScience
| Chart (2016) | Peak position |
|---|---|
| Belgian Albums (Ultratop Flanders) | 165 |
| Belgian Albums (Ultratop Wallonia) | 197 |
| US Billboard 200 | 129 |
| US Top Jazz Albums (Billboard) | 1 |
| US Indie Store Album Sales (Billboard) | 21 |
| US Top R&B/Hip-Hop Albums (Billboard) | 5 |
