= Black Radio 2 =

Studio album by Robert Glasper Experiment
- Released: October 29, 2013
- Recorded: 2013
- Studio: Main: Westlake Studios (Los Angeles, CA); Vocal recordings: ADBP Studios (Detroit, MI); Fever Recording Studios (Los Angeles, CA); Brooklyn Recording (Brooklyn, NY); Arts & Crafts Studios (New York, NY); The Dogghouse (Los Angeles, CA); The Attic Recording (Chicago, IL)
- Genre: Jazz; R&B
- Length: 59:36
- Label: Blue Note
- Producer: Robert Glasper

Robert Glasper Experiment chronology
Black Radio (2012)	Black Radio 2 (2013)	ArtScience (2016)

Robert Glasper chronology
Black Radio (2012)	Black Radio 2 (2013)	Covered: Recorded Live at Capitol Studios (2015)

Black Radio 2 is the sixth studio album by American musician Robert Glasper. It was released on October 29, 2013, via Blue Note Records as the sequel to the Robert Glasper Experiment's 2012 Black Radio marking his second album with the band.

The album was mainly recorded at Westlake Studios in Los Angeles, while several vocal recording sessions took place at ADBP Studios in Detroit, Fever Recording Studios and The Dogghouse in Los Angeles, Brooklyn Recording and Arts & Crafts Studios in New York, and The Attic Recording in Chicago. Production was handled by Glasper himself, with co-producers Eli Wolf, who also served as executive producer together with Nicole Hegeman, and Terrace Martin.

It features guest appearances from Anthony Hamilton, Brandy, Common, Dwele, Emeli Sandé, Faith Evans, Jill Scott, Lalah Hathaway, Luke James, Lupe Fiasco, Malcolm-Jamal Warner, Marsha Ambrosius, Norah Jones, Patrick Stump and Snoop Dogg, as well as Bilal, Eric Roberson, Jazmine Sullivan, Jean Grae and Macy Gray appeared on a deluxe version of the album.

At the 57th Annual Grammy Awards held in 2015, the album was nominated for a Grammy Award for Best R&B Album, but lost to Toni Braxton and Babyface's Love, Marriage & Divorce. The album's cut "Jesus Children" has won a Grammy Award for Best Traditional R&B Performance.

Its sequel, Black Radio III, was released on February 25, 2022, via Loma Vista Recordings.

== Critical reception ==
Professional ratings
Aggregate scores
Source	Rating
Metacritic	71/100
Review scores
Source	Rating
AllMusic	3.5/5 stars
Clash	7/10
Evening Standard	3/5 stars
Exclaim!	8/10
Financial Times	4/5 stars
Los Angeles Times	3/4 stars
PopMatters	8/10
Record Collector	2/5 stars
The Guardian	3/5 stars
The Line of Best Fit	4/10

Black Radio 2 was met with generally favourable reviews from music critics. At Metacritic, which assigns a normalized rating out of 100 to reviews from mainstream publications, the album received an average score of 71, based on eleven reviews.

AllMusic's Thom Jurek praised the album, saying "while it's true that it possesses fewer standout performances, it's wholly consistent, and on some level, it's braver for relying on original material to carry it. It requires more listening to appreciate fully. Taken as a whole, however, it serves and fulfills the role of a sequel: the album deepens the band's music-making aesthetic, and further establishes their sound not only as a signature, but even, perhaps, as its own genre". Chaka V. Grier of Exclaim! suggested: "Black Radio 2 will leave fans hungry for Black Radio 3". Chris Barton of Los Angeles Times resumed: "this is an R&B record, and a solid one". Will Layman of PopMatters stated: "song for song, it's also a more consistently terrific album to listen to, with the flow of catchy pop material undeniable and just enough edge in the form of hip-hop influence". Marcus J. Moore of Clash called it "a good, albeit safe recording".

In mixed reviews, Paul Bowler of Record Collector wrote: "what began as a series of bold experimentations dressed in a warm fuzzy melding of genres feels half-baked second time around". Robbie Wojciechowski of The Line of Best Fit found the album "just falls short of being anything more than generic sounding pop, produced by a jazz trio tinted by success".

== Commercial performance ==
In the United States, the album reached at number 16 on the Billboard 200, topped both the Jazz Albums and the Contemporary Jazz Albums, number 3 on the Top R&B/Hip-Hop Albums and number 2 on the Top R&B Albums charts. It also peaked at number 86 on the UK Albums Chart and number 5 on the Official UK Hip Hop and R&B Charts in the United Kingdom, number 22 in Japan, number 87 in South Korea and number 186 in France.

The song "Calls" made it to No. 18 on the US Adult R&B Airplay. The song "Somebody Else" reached No. 48 on the R&B/Hip-Hop Airplay and No. 15 on the Adult R&B Airplay in the US. The song "I Stand Alone" peaked at No. 41 on the Billboard Japan Hot 100.

== Track listing ==
No.	Title	Writer(s)	Length
1.	"Baby Tonight (Black Radio 2 Theme) / Mic Check 2"	Robert Glasper; Casey Benjamin; Derrick Hodge; Mark Colenburg	4:23
2.	"I Stand Alone" (featuring Common and Patrick Stump)	Glasper; Benjamin; Lonnie Lynn; Patrick Stump	4:53
3.	"What Are We Doing" (featuring Brandy)	Glasper; Brandy Norwood; Claude Kelly	3:34
4.	"Calls" (featuring Jill Scott)	Glasper; Jill Scott	5:42
5.	"Worries" (featuring Dwele)	Glasper; Colenburg; Paul Morton Jr.	3:37
6.	"Trust" (featuring Marsha Ambrosius)	Glasper; Marsha Ambrosius	7:29
7.	"Yet to Find" (featuring Anthony Hamilton)	Glasper; Andrea Martin	4:40
8.	"You Own Me" (featuring Faith Evans)	Glasper; Arita Lockett; Muhammad Ayers	4:25
9.	"Let It Ride" (featuring Norah Jones)	Glasper; Muhsinah Abdul-Karim	7:07
10.	"Persevere" (featuring Snoop Dogg, Lupe Fiasco and Luke James)	Glasper; Calvin Broadus; Wasalu Jaco; Luke James Boyd; Anu~Sun	4:35
11.	"Somebody Else" (featuring Emeli Sandé)	Glasper; Adele Gouraguine	3:43
12.	"Jesus Children" (featuring Lalah Hathaway and Malcolm-Jamal Warner)	Stevland Hardaway Morris	5:28
Total length:			59:36

Deluxe Version
No.	Title	Writer(s)	Length
13.	"Big Girl Body" (featuring Eric Roberson)	Glasper; Colenburg; Eric Roberson	5:05
14.	"You're My Everything" (featuring Bilal and Jazmine Sullivan)	Glasper; Ayers	4:19
15.	"I Don't Even Care" (featuring Macy Gray and Jean Grae)	Glasper; Natalie McIntyre; Tsidi Ibrahim	3:32
16.	"Lovely Day"	William Harrison Withers Jr.; Clarence Alexander Scarborough	5:07

Japanese Deluxe Version
No.	Title	Writer(s)	Length
17.	"Trust (Alternate Version)" (featuring Marsha Ambrosius and Common)	Glasper; Ambrosius	6:01

== Personnel ==
- Robert Glasper Experiment
  - Robert Glasper – Rhodes electric piano, piano, synth, producer
  - Casey Benjamin – saxophone, synth, vocoder
  - Derrick Hodge – bass
  - Mark Colenburg – drums, percussion
- Lonnie "Common" Lynn – vocals (tracks: 2, 17)
- Patrick Stump – vocals (track 2)
- Brandy Norwood – vocals (track 3)
- Jill Scott – vocals (track 4)
- Andwele "Dwele" Gardner – vocals & vocal engineering (track 5)
- Marsha Ambrosius – vocals (tracks: 6, 17)
- Anthony Hamilton – vocals (track 7)
- Faith Evans – vocals (track 8)
- Norah Jones – vocals (track 9)
- Calvin "Snoop Dogg" Broadus – vocals (track 10)
- Wasalu "Lupe Fiasco" Jaco – vocals (track 10)
- Luke James – vocals (track 10)
- Emeli Sandé – vocals (track 11)
- Eulaulah "Lalah" Hathaway – vocals (track 12)
- Malcolm-Jamal Warner – vocals (track 12)
- Eric Roberson – vocals (track 13)
- Bilal Sayeed Oliver – vocals (track 14)
- Jazmine Sullivan – vocals (track 14)
- Natalie "Macy Gray" McIntyre – vocals (track 15)
- Tsidi "Jean Grae" Ibrahim – vocals (track 15)
- Michael Eric Dyson – additional vocals (track 2)
- John P. Kee – additional vocals (track 6)
- Wayne Brady – additional vocals (track 10)
- Jahi Sundance – turntables (tracks: 2, 12)
- Eli Wolf – co-producer (track 9), executive producer, A&R
- Terrace Martin – co-producer & vocal engineering (track 10)
- Keith "Qmillion" Lewis – recording, mixing, engineering
- Josh Mosser – vocal engineering (track 3)
- Larry Whitt – vocal engineering (track 6)
- Andy Taub – vocal engineering (tracks: 7, 9, 11)
- Greg Magers – vocal engineering (track 10)
- Anu~Sun – vocal engineering (track 10)
- Marcus Johnson – engineering assistant
- Chris Athens – mastering
- Nicole Hegeman – executive producer, management
- JC Pagán – creative director, design
- Janette Beckman – photography
- Don Q. Hannah – additional photography
- Steve Cook – A&R
- Vincent Bennett – management

== Charts ==
Chart (2013)	Peak position
French Albums (SNEP)	186
Japanese Albums (Oricon)	22
South Korean Albums (Circle)	87
UK Albums (OCC)	86
UK R&B Albums (OCC)	5
US Billboard 200	16
US Top Jazz Albums (Billboard)	1
US Top Contemporary Jazz Albums (Billboard)	1
US Top R&B/Hip-Hop Albums (Billboard)	3
US Top R&B Albums (Billboard)	2
