= As It Is =

As It Is may refer to:

- As It Is (album), by John Taylor and Palle Danielsson, 1996
- As It Is (band), a British-American rock band formed in 2012
- As It Is, a 2010 short film starring Shelli Boone

== See also ==
- "As It Was", a 2022 song by Harry Styles
