= Ms. Triniti =

- Also known as: Triniti Bhaguandas
- Born: Jeanette-Triniti Marilyn Bhaguandas; March 6, 1978 (age 48)
- Origin: EnglandTrinidad; United States
- Genres: Dancehall, Reggae, Soca fusion, Pop
- Occupations: Recording artist, vocalist, songwriter
- Instruments: Singer-songwriter, dancer
- Years active: 2003–present
- Labels: Sony/Columbia (2003–2004)Universal Music Japan; Nicetunes UK (2005); Unseen Lab (2004–present); EMI Japan (2005–2008); Universal Music Canada (2009–present)Get Up Concertii Italy (2010–present); Sony/ATV Music Publishing (2010–present)
- Website: mstrinitimusic.com

Jeanette-Triniti Marilyn Bhaguandas (born March 6, 1978), better known by her stage name Ms. Triniti, is a Soca - Ragga - fusion singer-songwriter who mixes the Soca, dancehall, reggae and pop genres.

She is an independent artist, though has had two Top 20 Billboard R&B/Hip-Hop sales singles, two Top 5 singles in Jamaica, two of which reached number 1, as well as four studio albums on EMI/Japan to date.

== Early life ==
Bhaguandas was born in London, England, to an Indian Trinidadian father and an American mother. She spent her childhood years mostly in England, but traveling back and forth between Trinidad. She currently resides in Los Angeles. Her family name is Paguandas but was later changed to Bhaguandas by her father.

== Career ==
Ms. Triniti was signed to Sony/Columbia Records in 2003, but the album was never released. The recorded single became an underground hit in Japan and was followed with the album Ragga Hop which spent four weeks at number 1 on the HMV Reggae album charts. Soca Ragga Hop was later released on EMI/Japan in 2005. The album peaked at 39 on the Japanese Oricon Chart. Ms. Triniti was also signed to Sony Publishing Japan. Her second single, "Bongce Along" feat. E-Dee, produced by Qmillion, became a number 5 hit on Jamaica's Top 30 Singles chart in 2007, reached top 20 Billboard R&B/Hip Hop Sales Chart and earned her the Nomination for "Best New Artist" at Jamaica's EME awards. She has performed all over the world, including Germany, Italy, Ghana, Jamaica, Tanzania, Rwanda, Switzerland, Canada, Trinidad and Japan, has toured with Sean Paul, opened for Ja Rule, Fat Joe, Lil Wayne, Ludacris, T-Pain, Omarion and Beenie Man. Ms. Triniti collaborations include, "Lockdown" featuring Vybz Kartel which reached number 7 on Jamaica's Top 30 singles chart. "Burnin Burnin" feat Beenie Man, which spent two weeks at number 1 on Jamaica's Video charts (December 2008), and became her first number-one song on Jamaica's Top 30 Dancehall Singles Chart. Recently Ms Triniti hit number 1 again in Jamaica with her hit "If I was ur Girl". The song spent two weeks on the Dancehall Top 25, Hype TV's Top 10 video chart and Reggae Video Alley Top 10. Other collaborations include "Love It Like That" with Cham on his Ghetto Story album in 2006, "Never gonna Know" feat Da'ville and "1000 Lifetimes" with Beenie Man, 2008.

Ms Triniti has released five studio albums in Japan on EMI Records, Universal Records and Nippon Crown Records.

Ms. Triniti's music has been featured in numerous movies and TV shows, including The Layover, Big Momma's House, Kidnapped, Yellow, Zoom, Two for the Money, Like Mike II, The Boys & Girls Guide to Getting Down, featuring "Big Ups" and "Na ga Hold us Back"; Nadine in Dateland, featuring "Big Ups"; Yellow, featuring "Bongce Along"; Center Stage Two, featuring "Wi Burnin" and "Technique"; Khloe and Khourtney Take Miami, feat "Burnin Burnin" and "If I was ur Girl"; Keeping Up with the Kardashians, featuring "You're the Bomb" by DNC featuring Ms. Triniti; DollHouse; Canada's Next Top Model, and Stuck in the Middle.

== Discography ==
=== Albums ===
- 2005: Ragga Hop
- 2006: Do or Dare
- 2007: The Naked Truth
- 2009: Warrior Princess
- 2012: Ragga Lovers

=== Singles ===
- 2006 "Bongce Along" feat. E-Dee | Unseen Lab | ULR44912
- 2007 "Woy Yoy Yoy" | Trinigirl Music/Unseen Lab | ULR44932
- 2008 "Burnin Burnin" feat. Beenie Man | Trinigirl Music/Unseen Lab | ULR44962
- 2009 "Mr Deejay" | Trinigirl Music/EMI
- 2010 "Lockdown" feat. Vybz Kartel | Heart 2 Art Music
- 2011 "If I Was Your Girl" | Unseen Lab | ULR45901

=== Videos ===
- 2004 Based on a True Story
- 2005 Fa Da Love Of Da Dancehall
- 2005 Any Weh You Like It
- 2005 I Remember
- 2006 Bongce Along feat. E-Dee
- 2007 Wi Burnin (Woy Yoy Yoy)
- 2008 Burnin Burnin feat. Beenie Man
- 2009 Mr. Deejay
- 2010 Lockdown feat. Vybz Kartel
- 2011 If I Was Your Girl
- 2012 Baby I love you

== Filmography ==
Film
Year	Film	Role	Notes
2010	Six Days in Paradise	Soprano Vocalist (in Miata)	Film Debut
2011	Out the Gate	Herself	

== Awards ==
=== Won ===
- 2011 Tanzania Music Awards – Best Video and Best Ragga/Dancehall Song ('Action' with CPWAA, Mangwair & Dully Sykes)

=== Nominations ===
- 2008 Jamaica's EME Awards (Excellence in Music and Entertainment Awards) – Best New Female Artist
- 2012 Tanzania Music Awards – Best Ragga/Dancehall Song ('Good look' with AY)
