= Qmillion =

- Also known as: Qmillion Riddim
- Born: Keith Lewis
- Genres: Soul, R&B, pop, jazz, alternative, dancehall, reggae, hip hop, electronic,
- Occupations: Record producer, mix engineer, composer, songwriter
- Instruments: Vocals, keyboards, bass, guitar programmer
- Years active: 1984–present
- Website: qmillion.com

Qmillion (born Keith Lewis, in the US), is an American record producer, mix engineer, composer, and songwriter based in Los Angeles, California, United States. Qmillion's achievement for recording and mixing recording artist Robert Glasper's critically acclaimed Black Radio album, gained him a Grammy Award for Best R&B Album at the 55th Grammy Awards in 2013. and most recently nominated for Grammy Award for Best Engineered Album, Non-Classical for Black Radio III by Robert Glasper on the 2023 Grammys. He has also written songs for films, including "Nights Like This" for The Five Heartbeats, and composed the score for the film Out the Gate.

== Career ==
Qmillion's professional musical career began in Minneapolis where he collaborated with Jesse Johnson as a member of Johnson's band before he wrote and produced songs with Johnson for TaMara and the Seen, Paula Abdul, Cheryl Lynn, and After 7. In 1992 Qmillion moved to Los Angeles, produced and wrote songs for, Brownstone, Shello, Paula Abdul, George Howard, Billy Preston, E-Dee, Ms. Triniti, Beenie Man, Wayne Wonder, Kurupt among others.

In 2011, Qmillion carried several credits in "Out the Gate" a feature film loosely based on the life of E-Dee; writing the screenplay and composing the score to the picture. The film was released to theaters in Los Angeles, New York, Atlanta, Toronto, as well as Jamaica. Newspaper Atlanta Daily World wrote the movie "appears to be on its way to becoming a classic".

In 2013 Qmillion's achievement for recording and mixing recording artist Robert Glasper's critically acclaimed Black Radio album, gained him a Grammy Award for Best R&B Album at the 55th Grammy Awards.

In 2022 Qmillion was nominated for Grammy Award for Best Engineered Album, Non-Classical for Black Radio III by Robert Glasper on the 2023 Grammys, and won for or Black Radio III by Robert Glasper Grammy Award for Best R&B Album at the 65th Grammy Awards. To date, he has mixed projects with 14 Grammy nominations, 4 of those projects have won.

== Songs in film and television ==
Amongst the many composed by Qmillion, several were written especially for film. It began with The Five Heartbeats, "Nights Like This", written by Johnson and Qmillion (under the name Keith Lewis). The song, performed by After 7 rose to Top Ten Billboard R&B. Writing songs specific for feature films continued with White Men Can't Jump, Beautiful, The Sweetest Thing, Center Stage 2 all leading to him composing the score to Hurricane in the Rose Garden, and Out the Gate.

A select list of Film and Television shows featuring Qmillion compositions include: America's Got Talent, biography, Blue Bloods, The Bad Girls Club", Born to Style, Bring It!, Challengers, Dish Nation, Dr. Oz Show, The Fabulous Life of, Greek, Happyland, Hey Paula, Kardashians, Leeza Show, LOL Comedy Series", Love & Hip-Hop: Atlanta, Marrying the Game, New Atlanta, Nick Studio 10, One Tree Hill, The Queen Latifah Show, Vibe, Yo Mama, The Five Heartbeats, The Sweetest Thing, Phat Beach, White Men Can't Jump, Pootie Tang, Center Stage 2, Out the Gate

== Discography ==
=== Producer ===
- 1987 TaMara and the Seen (A&M Records) ("Tears":writer)
- 1989 Cheryl Lynn (Virgin Records) "Whatever it Takes"
- 1990 Kool Skool (Capitol) (album)
- 1990 Three Shade Brown (Interscope Records) (album)
- 1991 After 7 (Virgin Records) "Nights Like This"
- 1992 Jesse Johnson (White Men Cant Jump:Soundtrack) (EMI Records)
- 1993 George Howard (GRP/MCA) "Grazin in the Grass"
- 1994 Shello (Giant/Warner Bros) "West Coast Boogie" and others
- 1995 Brownstone (MJJ/Sony) "Pass the Lovin"
- 1997 Billy Preston Minister of Music (PepperCo)
- 2004 Ms. Triniti Ragga Hop (Toshiba/EMI)"
- 2005 E-Dee R U Ready EP (Unseen Lab)
- 2006 Ms. Triniti Do or Dare (EMI Japan)
- 2006 E-Dee (Unseen Lab) JA 2 LA 2 Di World
- 2007 Various Artists Unseen Family Compilation Vol 1(Unseen Lab)
- 2007 Ms. Triniti Naked Truth (Virgin/EMI)
- 2009 Ms. Triniti Wi Burnin (Unseen Lab)
- 2010 Ms. Triniti Burnin Burnin (feat Beenie Man) (Unseen Lab)
- 2009 Ms. Triniti Warrior Princess (Universal)
- 2011 E-Dee Rightful Place (Unseen Lab
- 2012 Various Artists "Out the Gate:Motion Picture Soundtrack" (Unseen Lab)
- 2013 Kurupt Money Bitches Power (mixtape) "Listen"
- 2014 E-Dee "So Badmind" (Unseen Lab)
- 2014 Kurupt MoonRocks (mixtape) "Livin 4 2Day"
- 2015 Jillian Speer "Daggers & Suede" EP

=== As mix engineer ===
- 1996 Mint Condition- Definition of a Band (A&M) (Funky Weekend)
- 1998 Billy Preston – "Billy's Back"
- 2001 Billy Preston – "Music from my Heart"
- 2001 Billy Preston – "Minister of Music" (PepperCo)
- 2004 Billy Preston – "Salute to the Beatles" (PMG)
- 2009 Robert Glasper – Double-Booked (Blue Note) GRAMMY NOMINATED
- 2010 Kenneth Whalum – "To Those Who Believe")
- 2012 Robert Glasper – Black Radio (Blue Note) GRAMMY AWARD
- 2012 Robert Glasper – Black Radio Recovered: The Remix EP (Blue Note)
- 2012 Various Artists – "Out the Gate:Motion Picture Soundtrack (Unseen Lab)"
- 2013 Robert Glasper – Black Radio 2 (Blue Note) GRAMMY NOMINATED
- 2013 Kurupt – "Money Bitches Power" (mixtape) "Listen"
- 2013 Chris Dave and the Drumhedz – (mixtape) (several songs)
- 2014 Seun Kuti – "A Long Way to the Beginning"(Knitting Factory
- 2014 Bo Saris – "Gold"(Deram)"
- 2014 Kurupt – "Moon Rocks" (mixtape) "Living for Today"
- 2015 Robert Glasper – Covered (Blue Note, 2015) GRAMMY NOMINATED
- 2015 Jillian Speer – "Daggers & Suede" EP
- 2016 Tweet - "Charlene" (E One) - Album
- 2016 Derrick Hodge – "The Second" (Blue Note) - Album
- 2016 Robert Glasper – "ArtScience" (Blue Note) - Album
- 2016 Seun Kuti - "Struggle Sounds" (Sony) - EP
- 2017 Maurice "Mobetta" Brown - "The Mood" (Mobetta/Ropeadope)
- 2018 Seun Kuti - "Black Times" (Strut) - Album GRAMMY NOMINATED
- 2018 R+R=NOW - "Collegially Speaking" (Blue Note) - Album
- 2018 Justin Kauflin - "Coming Home" (Qwest) - Album
- 2018 Phony Ppl - "Mozaik" (300 Ent) - Album
- 2018 Alfredo Rodriquez - "Duo" (Mack Ave) - Album
- 2019 Tank and the Bangas - "Green Balloon" - (Verve)
- 2019 Christian Scott - “Ancestral Recall (album)” (Ropeadope) - Album GRAMMY NOMINATED
- 2019 Robert Glasper – "Fu*k Yo Feelings" (Loma Vista) - Album GRAMMY NOMINATED
- 2019 Mykal Kilgore - "Man Born Black" GRAMMY NOMINATED
- 2020 Derrick Hodge – "Color Of Noise" (Blue Note) - Album
- 2020 Ledisi - The Wild Card - (Listen Back) - (3 songs mixed)
- 2020 Christian Scott - Axiom (Stretch Music/Ropeadope) - Album GRAMMY NOMINATED

== Awards ==
- Qmillion won a Grammy Award, Robert Glasper's 2012 Best Contemporary R&B Album, Robert Glasper-Black Radio.
- Qmillion also mixed Grammy Award-winning Robert Glasper's 2014 Best Traditional R&B Performance,"Jesus Children" feat. Lalah Hathaway and Malcolm-Jamal Warner

and Grammy Award-winning Robert Glasper's 2020 Best R&B Song "Better Than I Imagined" featuring H.E.R. and Meshell Ndegeocello

== Grammy Nominated ==
- 2009 Robert Glasper-Double-Booked (Blue Note) NOMINATED Grammy Award for Best Urban/Alternative Performance
- 2012 Robert Glasper-Black Radio (Blue Note) GRAMMY AWARDBest R&B Album, Best R&B Performance
- 2013 Robert Glasper-Black Radio 2 (Blue Note) NOMINATED Best R&B Album
- 2013 Robert Glasper-Jesus Children (ft. Lalah Hathaway (Blue Note) GRAMMY AWARDBest R&B Performance
- 2015 Robert Glasper-Covered: Recorded Live at Capitol Records (Blue Note, 2015) NOMINATED Best Jazz Instrumental Album
- 2018 Seun Kuti - "Black Times" - Album NOMINATEDBest World Music Album
- 2019 Tank and the Bangas - "Green Balloon" - (Verve) NOMINATEDBest New Artist
- 2019 Christian Scott - “Ancestral Recall (album)” (Ropeadope) - Album NOMINATEDBest Contemporary Instrumental Album
- 2019 Robert Glasper – "Fuck Yo Feelings" (Loma Vista) - Album NOMINATED Best Progressive R&B Album
- 2019 Mykal Kilgore - "Man Born Black" NOMINATED Best Traditional R&B Performance
- 2020 Christian Scott - “Axiom” (Stretch Music/Ropeadope) - Album NOMINATED Best Contemporary Instrumental Album
- 2022 Robert Glasper - "Black Radio III" (Loma Vista) Album WON Best R&B Album
- 2022 Terrace Martin - "Drones" (Sounds of Crenshaw/BMG)Atmos Mix NOMINATEDBest Progressive R&B Album
- 2022 Amir Sulaiman - "You Will Be Someones Ancestor. Act Accordingly." album NOMINATED Best Spoken Word Poetry Album
