= Black Radio III =

Black Radio 3
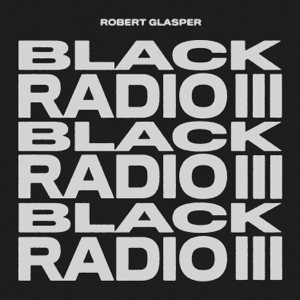

Studio album by Robert Glasper
- Released: February 25, 2022
- Studios: AbLab Studios, NJ; Creation Studios; GM Hideaway Studios; Gumbo Studios; Henson Recordings; Layera Studios; Night Night Studios; Vocal Throne Studio Room; WoodWorks Records Studio
- Genres: jazz, jazz rap, hip-hop, soul, R&B
- Length: 67:15
- Label: Loma Vista
- Producer: Robert Glasper

Robert Glasper chronology
Dinner Party (2020)	Black Radio 3 (2022)	Let Go (2024)

Black Radio 3 (stylized as BLACK RADIO III) is an album by American musician Robert Glasper. It was released on February 25, 2022, via Loma Vista Recordings, serving as the follow-ups to 2012's Black Radio and 2013's Black Radio 2. It was produced by Glasper along with co-producers Terrace Martin, Bryan-Michael Cox and Jahi Sundance, and mixed by Qmillion.

== Background ==
The album features a host of guest appearances from Amir Sulaiman, Ant Clemons, Big K.R.I.T., BJ the Chicago Kid, Common, D Smoke, Esperanza Spalding, Gregory Porter, H.E.R., India.Arie, Jennifer Hudson, Killer Mike, Lalah Hathaway, Ledisi, Meshell Ndegeocello, Musiq Soulchild, PJ Morton, Posdnuos, Q-Tip, Tiffany Gouché, Ty Dolla $ign and Yebba.

The album marked a commercial decline in the Black Radio Series, after it failed to chart on the Billboard 200. However, it received favorable reviews from music critics. At the 65th Grammy Awards, it was nominated for Best Engineered Album, Non-Classical, and won Best R&B Album. The track "Better Than I Imagined" featuring H.E.R. and Me'Shell Ndegéocello also received the Grammy for Best R&B Performance that year.

== Critical reception ==
Professional ratings
Aggregate scores
Source	Rating
AnyDecentMusic?	7.3/10
Metacritic	75/100
Review scores
Source	Rating
AllMusic	4/5 stars
DownBeat	3/5 stars
Jazzwise	3/5 stars
Loud and Quiet	5/10
Mojo	3/5 stars
Paste	8.2/10
Record Collector	4/5 stars
Rolling Stone	3.5/5 stars
Tom Hull	B+
Uncut	8/10

According to the review aggregator Metacritic, Black Radio III received "generally favorable reviews" based on a weighted average score of 75 out of 100 from 4 critic scores. Aggregator AnyDecentMusic? gave it 7.3 out of 10, based on their assessment of the critical consensus.

Mancy Gant of the Rolling Stone wrote: "As an enjoyable fan-service sequel intended to offer music of comfort and solace, Black Radio III is fine. As an artist, Glasper is allowed to get into his beatmaker bag, relaunch the Black Radio brand, and leave the New Jazz Thing bleeding edge to others. But one can’t help but wish the stakes were a bit higher." Saby Reyes-Kulkarni of Paste stated: "Black Radio III makes a rather compelling case for jazz and hip-hop as mutually sustaining forms that not only beautify and propel one another forward, but also provide the inspiration for the rest of us to do the same amongst ourselves. The album grapples openly with America’s collective inability to come to terms with the paradox of being fascinated by a people and a culture that it’s put so much energy into denigrating."

== Track listing ==
Black Radio III – Standard edition
No.	Title	Writer(s)	Producer(s)	Length
1.	"In Tune" (featuring Amir Sulaiman)	Robert Andre Glasper; Amir Sulaiman	Robert Glasper	3:18
2.	"Black Superhero" (featuring Killer Mike, BJ the Chicago Kid and Big K.R.I.T.)	Glasper; Michael Render; Bryan James Sledge; Justin Scott	Robert Glasper	5:55
3.	"Shine" (featuring D Smoke and Tiffany Gouché)	Glasper; Daniel Anthony Farris; Tiffany Venise Gouché; Justin Tyson	Robert Glasper	6:28
4.	"Why We Speak" (featuring Q-Tip and Esperanza Spalding)	Glasper; Kamaal Fareed; Esperanza Spalding; Burniss Travis	Robert Glasper	6:19
5.	"Over" (featuring Yebba)	Glasper; Abbey Smith	Robert Glasper	4:55
6.	"Better Than I Imagined" (featuring H.E.R. and Me'Shell Ndegéocello)	Glasper; Gabriella Wilson; Meshell Ndegeocello	Robert Glasper	4:51
7.	"Everybody Wants to Rule the World" (featuring Lalah Hathaway and Common)	Roland Orzabal; Ian Stanley; Christopher Hughes	Robert Glasper	5:41
8.	"Everybody Love" (featuring Musiq Soulchild and Posdnous)	Glasper; Taalib Johnson; Kelvin Mercer; Alexander Lloyd	Robert Glasper; Jahi Sundance (co.)	5:03
9.	"It Don't Matter" (featuring Gregory Porter and Ledisi)	Glasper; Gregory Porter; Ledisi Young; Tyson; Christopher Dave	Robert Glasper	5:27
10.	"Heaven's Here" (featuring Ant Clemons)	Glasper; Anthony Clemons Jr.	Robert Glasper; Bryan-Michael Cox (co.)	3:56
11.	"Out of My Hands" (featuring Jennifer Hudson)	Glasper; Jennifer Hudson; Brittany Chikyra Barber	Robert Glasper; Terrace Martin (co.)	5:35
12.	"Forever" (featuring PJ Morton and India.Arie)	Glasper; Paul S. Morton Jr.; India Arie Simpson	Robert Glasper	5:45
13.	"Bright Lights" (featuring Ty Dolla $ign)	Glasper; Tyrone Griffin Jr.	Robert Glasper; Terrace Martin (co.)	4:02
Total length:				67:15

Black Radio III – Japanese edition (bonus tracks)
No.	Title	Writer(s)	Producer(s)	Length
14.	"Better Than I Imagined" (Instrumental)	Glasper; Wilson; Ndegeocello	Robert Glasper	4:20
15.	"Easy to See" (featuring BJ the Chicago Kid)	Glasper; Sledge	Robert Glasper	1:53
Total length:				73:35

Black Radio III – Supreme Edition
No.	Title	Producer(s)	Length
14.	"Lemonade" (featuring PJ Morton)	Robert Glasper	1:20
15.	"Therapy Pt. 2" (featuring Mac Miller)	Robert Glasper	3:22
16.	"Something I Wouldn't Do" (featuring Estelle)	Robert Glasper	5:45
17.	"Lola Crying" (Interlude)	Robert Glasper	1:30
18.	"My Queen" (featuring Luke James)	Robert Glasper	4:42
19.	"Hi" (featuring India Arie)	Robert Glasper	2:24
20.	"Invitation" (featuring Emily King)	Robert Glasper	3:41
21.	"Easy to See" (Interlude) (featuring BJ the Chicago Kid)	Robert Glasper	1:54
22.	"Voyage to Atlantis" (featuring Bilal & Alex Isley)	Robert Glasper	6:40

Notes

- Track 2 contains spoken words from Christian Scott aTunde Adjuah and voices of Josephine Hodge and Riley Glasper.

== Charts ==
Chart performance for Black Radio III
Chart (2022)	Peak position
Belgian Albums (Ultratop Flanders)	176
Japanese Hot Albums (Billboard Japan)	60
Japan (Oricon)	46
Scottish Albums (Official Charts)	58
Swiss Albums (Schweizer Hitparade)	66
UK Album Downloads (Official Charts)	23
