= Out the Gate (film) =

- Release Poster
- Directed by: R. Steven Johnson and Qmillion
- Written by: Qmillion; Everton Dennis
- Produced by: Keith Lewis; Everton Dennis; Susanne Lovejoy; Philippo Francinni; R. Steven Johnson; Cynthia Enriquez
- Starring: Paul Campbell; Oliver Samuels; Shelli Boone; Everton Dennis
- Cinematography: Livingston Siwell
- Edited by: Norem Furia
- Music by: Qmillion
- Production company: Far I Films
- Distributed by: Far I Films (Theatrical)
- Release dates: 19 October 2011 (Jamaica); 13 May 2011 (United States)
- Running time: 104 minutes
- Countries: Jamaica; United States
- Languages: English; Jamaican Patois

Out the Gate is a 2011 Jamaican action film that follows Everton Dennis, played by Everton Dennis as he leave his home in Jamaica to make it big in the United States in music. It stars Paul Campbell, Oliver Samuels, Shelli Boone, and Everton Dennis, was written by Qmillion and Everton Dennis and directed by R. Steven Johnson and Qmillion. The picture had its official limited release in the United States and Jamaica Distributed by Far I Films in 2011 followed by the DVD in 2012. The film was released to theaters in Los Angeles, New York, Atlanta, Toronto, as well as Jamaica. Newspaper Atlanta Daily World wrote the movie "appears to be on its way to becoming a classic."

== Plot ==
The film tells the story of a dreamer, Everton (Everton Dennis) who after things go wrong in his home town of (Toll Gate) Clarendon, leaves for the United States to make it big in music, where the Don of LA (Paul Campbell) demands more than he can deliver.

== Cast ==
- Paul Campbell as "Badz"
- Oliver Samuels as "Uncle Willie"
- Shelli Boone as "Tamika"
- Everton Dennis as "E-Dee"

== Soundtrack ==
- "Ghetto Yutes Rise" feat. I-Octane by E-Dee
- "Bruk Whyne" by E-Dee
- "Hot Like Fiyah" by Junior P.
- "Everyday" by Mr. Lexx
- "Bongce Along" feat E-Dee by Ms. Triniti
- "Wi Party" feat Akapello by E-Dee
- "Bottle Service" feat. Jadakiss by Duane Darock
- "Time Fi Move Up" feat. Vannichi and E-Dee by Qmillion
- "Cant Stop Wi" feat Busy Signal by Karl Morrison
- "No Other Girl" by E-Dee

== Release dates ==
- US Theatrical Release (Limited) - May 13, 2011
- US Soundtrack Release - June 5, 2012
- US Video/DVD Release - Dec 11, 2012
