= Casey Benjamin =

American musician (1978–2024)

- Born: October 10, 1978; New York City, U.S.
- Died: March 30, 2024 (aged 45)
- Genres: Jazz, Hip-hop, R&B, Funk, Pop, New Wave
- Occupations: Saxophonist, vocoderist, keyboardist, producer, songwriter
- Instruments: Saxophone (alto and soprano), Vocoder, Keyboard
- Formerly of: Robert Glasper Experiment, HEAVy, Stefon Harris's Blackout

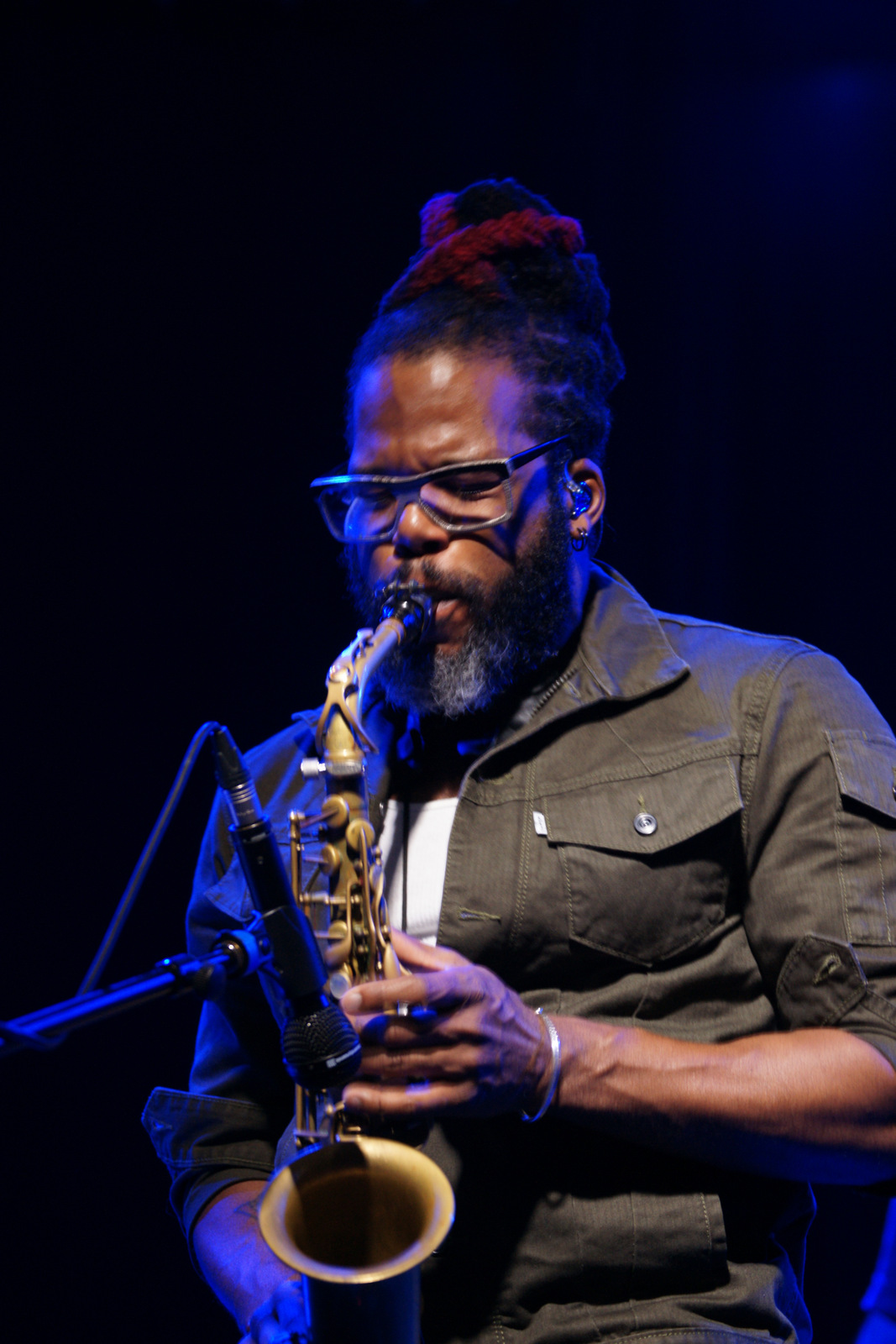
Benjamin performing in 2012

Casey Benjamin (October 10, 1978 – March 30, 2024) was an American saxophonist (alto and soprano), vocoderist, keyboardist, producer, and songwriter. He was a member of the Robert Glasper Experiment which won a Grammy Award for Best R&B Album for their album Black Radio. He was one half of the funk pop new wave duo HEAVy with vocalist Nicky Guiland.

Benjamin was also a member of Stefon Harris's band Blackout and worked with numerous artists at the intersection of jazz, hip-hop, and R&B, including Roy Hargrove, Betty Carter, Derrick Hodge, Victor Bailey, Kris Bowers, Kendrick Lamar, Nas, Q-Tip, Mos Def, Lupe Fiasco, Kanye West, Busta Rhymes, Diddy, Heavy D, Consequence, DJ Logic, Wyclef Jean, Bilal, Mary J. Blige, John Legend, and Beyonce. He also worked with rockers Vernon Reid and Melvin Gibbs. In 2011, he was the keyboard/saxophonist for Patrick Stump's live solo project tour.

Benjamin was from South Jamaica, Queens, New York City. He picked up the saxophone at eight years old and continued studying the instrument at Fiorello H. LaGuardia High School of Music & Art and Performing Arts. He also attended workshops with jazz pianist Barry Harris. Later, he attended The New School for Jazz and Contemporary Music in Manhattan, where he met Robert Glasper.

Benjamin died suddenly on March 30, 2024, at the age of 45. The cause of his death was a pulmonary thromboembolism (blood clot). According to a statement released by his family on his social media, he was recovering from a recent surgery at the time of his death.

== Discography ==
=== As sideman ===
Year recorded	Leader	Title	Label
2004	Stefon Harris	Evolution	Blue Note
2009	Robert Glasper	Double Booked	Blue Note
2009	Stefon Harris	Urbanus	Concord
2011	Robert Glasper	Black Radio	Blue Note
2012	Kris Bowers	Heroes + Misfits	Concord
2013	Robert Glasper	Black Radio 2	Blue Note
