= Oliver Samuels =

Jamaican comedian and actor (born 1948)

Oliver Samuels CD
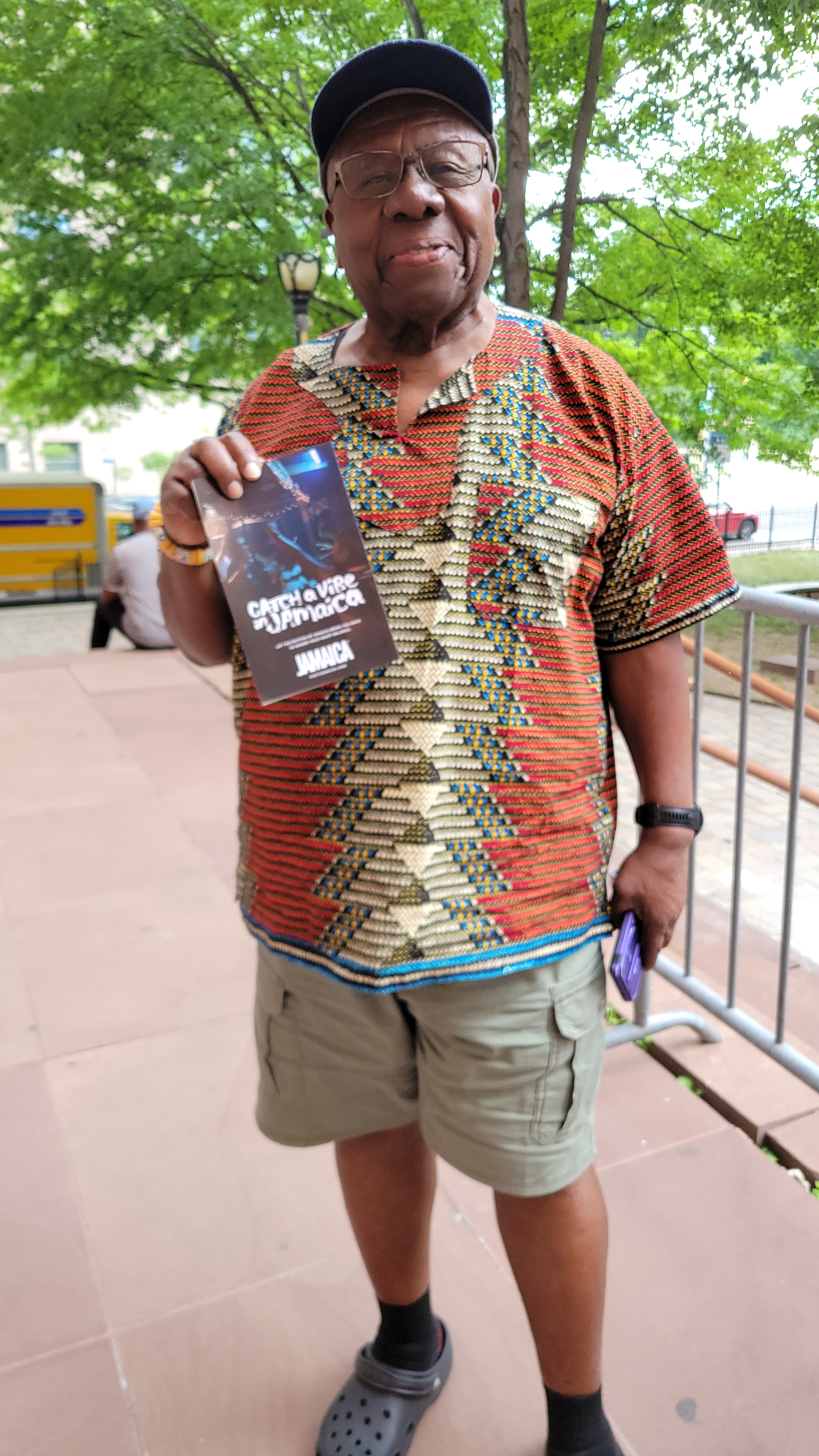
- Samuels in 2026.
- Born: Oliver Adolphus Samuels; 4 November 1948 (age 77); Saint Mary, Colony of Jamaica, British Empire
- Notable work: Oliver at Large
- Children: 6
- Relatives: Brother, Christopher Humber

Oliver Adolphus Samuels CD (born 4 November 1948) is a Jamaican comedian and actor. He has been described as the Jamaican "King of Comedy", performing both stand-up and comic theatre.

== Filmography ==
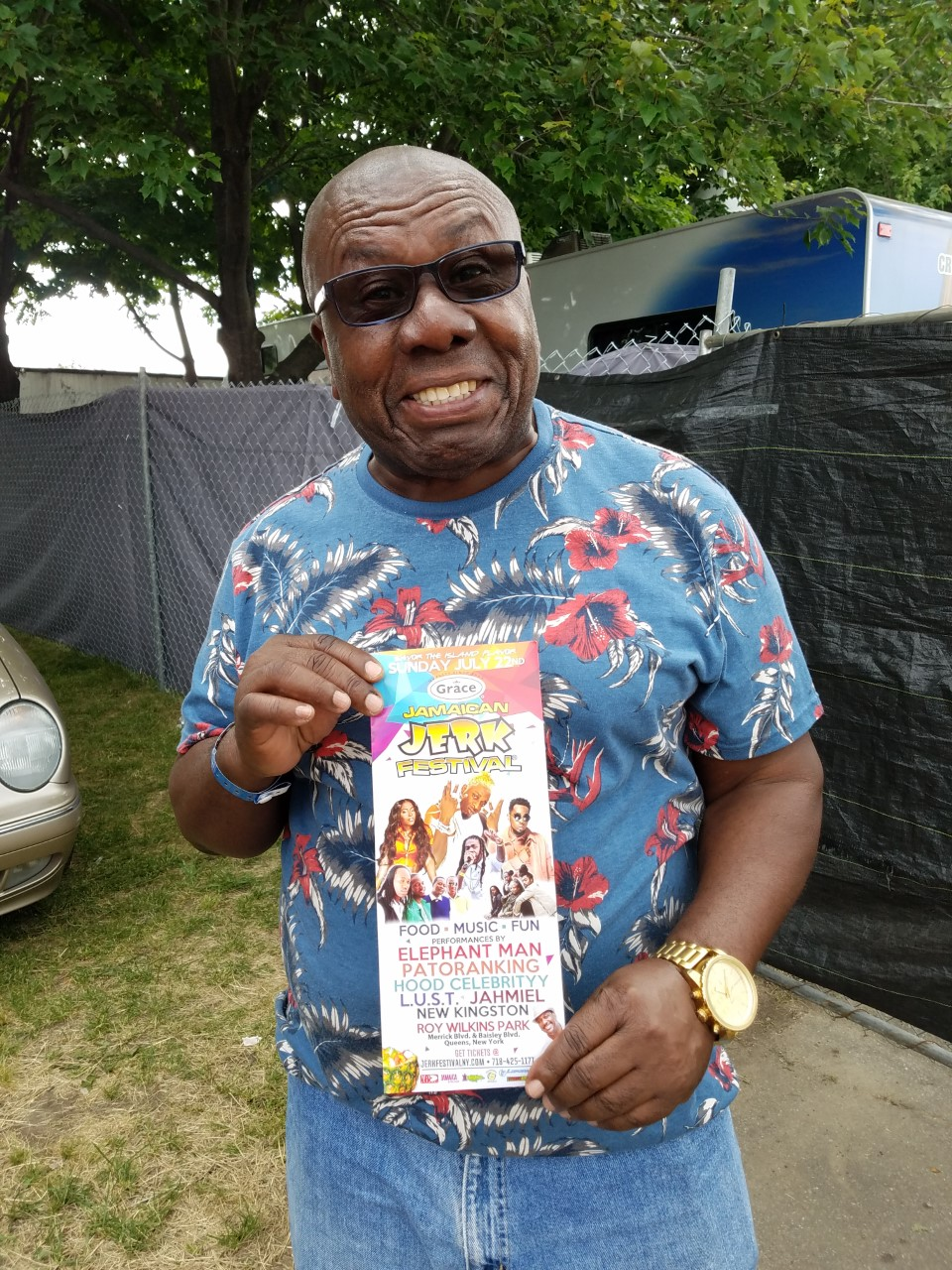
Samuels in 2018

Year	Title	Role	Notes
2006	Class of '73	Mr. B. Pringle	
1976	Smile Orange	Snail race	
1982	Countryman	Pillion	
1987	Hammerhead		
1989	The Mighty Quinn	Rupert	
1987/1988	Oliver at Large	Thomas	
1993–1996	Chef!	Dad / Justin	2 episodes
1994	Great Moments in Aviation	Thomas	
2005	Almost Heaven	Hotel Manager	
2011	Out the Gate	Uncle Willie	

== Plays ==
Common Law as Winston 6 November (2009), Midnight at Puss Creek (2011), Di Prodigal Pickney (2025).
