= Double-Booked =

Double Booked

Studio album by Robert Glasper
- Released: August 25, 2009
- Studio: Systems Two (Brooklyn, NY); Brooklyn Recording (Brooklyn, NY)
- Length: 1:12:19
- Label: Blue Note
- Producer: Robert Glasper

Robert Glasper chronology
In My Element (2007)	Double Booked (2009)	Black Radio (2012)

Professional ratings
Review scores
Source	Rating
AllMusic	4/5 stars
Billboard	4/5 stars
PopMatters	6/10
The Guardian	4/5 stars
Tom Hull	B−
Under the Radar	8/10 stars

Double Booked is the fourth studio album by American pianist and record producer Robert Glasper. It was released on August 25, 2009, via Blue Note Records. Recording sessions took place at Systems 2 Studios and Brooklyn Recording in New York City. Produced entirely by Glasper himself, it features contributions from drummer Chris Dave, bassists Vicente Archer and Derrick Hodge and saxophonist Casey Benjamin, as well as Bilal, Mos Def, Questlove, Terence Blanchard and Jahi Sundance.

== Track listing ==
The Robert Glasper Trio
No.	Title	Writer(s)	Length
1.	"Intro"		0:30
2.	"No Worries"	Robert Glasper	7:08
3.	"Yes I'm Country (And That's OK)"	Glasper	8:08
4.	"Downtime"	Glasper	5:23
5.	"59 South"	Glasper	6:13
6.	"Think of One"	Thelonious Monk	9:13

The Robert Glasper Experiment
No.	Title	Writer(s)	Length
7.	"4eva"	Glasper; Dante Smith	2:17
8.	"Butterfly"	Herbert Hancock; Benjamin Maupin; Jean Hancock	6:02
9.	"Festival"	Glasper	10:04
10.	"For You"	Sameer Gupta; Casey Benjamin	2:12
11.	"All Matter"	Bilal Sayeed Oliver	6:35
12.	"Open Mind"	Derrick Hodge	8:34
Total length:			1:12:19

== Personnel ==
- Robert Glasper – piano, electric piano, producer
- Chris Dave – drums
- Vicente Archer – double bass (tracks: 1–6)
- Derrick Hodge – bass guitar (tracks: 7–12)
- Casey Benjamin – alto saxophone & vocoder (tracks: 7–12)
- Terence Blanchard – voice (track 1)
- Dante "Mos Def" Smith – rap vocals (track 7)
- Ahmir "?uestlove" Thompson – voice (track 7)
- Bilal Oliver – vocals (tracks: 11, 12)
- Jahi Sundance – scratches (track 12)
- Joe Marciano – recording & mixing (tracks: 1–6)
- Keith "Qmillion" Lewis – recording & mixing (tracks: 7–12)
- Mike Marciano – mastering
- Konstantin Dzhibilov – art direction, design
- Joey Lawrence – photography
- Marques Green – additional photography
- Eli Wolf – A&R
- Gordon H Jee – creative director
- Shanieka D. Brooks – product management

== Charts ==
Chart (2007)	Peak position
US Top Jazz Albums (Billboard)	7
