= Jillian Speer =

American singer-songwriter and musician (born 1979)

- Born: February 18, 1979 (age 47); Seattle, Washington, U.S.
- Origin: United States
- Genres: Folk music Acoustic; Folk; Soft Rock
- Occupations: Singer-songwriter, record label owner
- Instrument: Guitar
- Years active: 2000–present
- Label: Speerit Records
- Members: Jillian Speer – vocals, acoustic Guitar
- Website: www.jillianspeer.com

Jillian Speer is an American singer-songwriter and musician. Her current album, Deeper This Way, was released in 2016. Her music genre has been described as adult alternative, punk folk, soulful rock, and world music.

== Early life ==
Born and raised north of Seattle in the United States Pacific Northwest, she thrived on dance, music, and acting, studying dance from age three (ballet, tap, jazz, and modern), and competing nationally and regionally till she was 16 years old. She started studying voice at nine, and classical guitar at ten. At age 16, Speer received an international scholarship to study in India for one year, where she became a certified yoga instructor and learned how to play the sitar.

== Career ==
After living in India for a year, Speer returned to the US and began recording her compositions. Collaborating with musicians from the Seattle area she completed her first demo at 18, and moved to Los Angeles. She began doing live shows and building a following while she recorded her first album. Indian influences permitted her first album, incorporating Hindu chants, and lyrics about the earth, over acoustic guitar and world rhythms. Over time between live shows and pure hustle, she sold thousands of copies of her independent release, "Silent Teaching" that was nominated for Best Album at the LA Music Awards in 2001. In the following year she opened several dates for Jewel. Speer came close to signing deals with major labels, but never found the right home for her music. After a hiatus, Jillian re-emerged in 2015, backed by an all-star band on her six-song EP "Daggers & Suede", followed by the full-length album "Deeper This Way" which dropped in 2016 and is currently on the college radio charts.

== Achievements ==
- She has played at New York City's Songwriters Hall of Fame, and two of California's biggest music festivals, Reggae on the River and Earthdance Festival.
- Her title song, "Angel Among Us", was released on a Songwriters Hall of Fame compilation CD.
- Speer has been nominated "Best Album of the Year," by the 2001 LA Music Awards.
- Her music has been on Party of Five, the television series.
- Two of her songs are in a feature film being played on Showtime and HBO called Purpose.
- In 2005, an entertainment segment about Speer was featured on Oprah's cable channel, Oxygen.

== Discography ==
=== Albums ===
- Silent Teaching (2001)
- Deeper This Way (2016)

=== Singles/EP ===
- Daggers & Suede (EP) (2015)
- Remixing The Stone (EP) (2015)
- Zion (2016)

=== Music Videos ===
- Zion (2016)
- Daggers & Suede (2016)
