= Fuck Yo Feelings =

Mixtape by Robert Glasper
- Released: October 3, 2019
- Studios: Henson Recording Studios (Los Angeles, California); Sound Inn Studio (Tokyo, Japan); More Than Enough Studios
- Genre: Jazz rap
- Length: 1:11:13
- Label: Loma Vista
- Producer: Robert Glasper

Professional ratings
Review scores
Source	Rating
AllMusic	3/5 stars
Jazz Forum	4.5/5 stars
laut.de	3/5 stars
Mojo	3/5 stars
Pitchfork	5.9/10
The Spill Magazine	4/5 stars
Tom Hull	B+

Fuck Yo Feelings is a mixtape by American musician Robert Glasper. It was released on October 3, 2019 through Loma Vista Recordings, his first one with that music label.

== Background ==
Recording sessions took place at Henson Recording Studios in Los Angeles, at Sound Inn Studio in Tokyo, and at More Than Enough Studios. Production was handled by Glasper himself, with co-producers Chris Dave, Derrick Hodge and Curtis Jews. It features guest appearances from Affion Crockett, Andra Day, Baby Rose, Bilal, Bridget Kelly, Buddy, Denzel Curry, Herbie Hancock, James Poyser, Mick Jenkins, Mos Def, Muhsinah, Queen Sheba, Rapsody, SiR, Song Bird, Staceyann Chin, Terrace Martin, YBN Cordae and Yebba.

The album was nominated for the Grammy Award for Best Progressive R&B Album at the 63rd Annual Grammy Awards, but lost to Thundercat's It Is What It Is.

== Track listing ==
No.	Title	Writer(s)	Length
1.	"Intro" (featuring Affion Crockett)	Robert Glasper; Affion Crockett; Christopher Dave; Derrick Hodge	4:48
2.	"This Changes Everything" (featuring Buddy, Denzel Curry, Terrace Martin and James Poyser)	Glasper; Simmie Sims; Denzel Curry; Dave; Hodge	4:16
3.	"Gone" (featuring YBN Cordae, Bilal and Herbie Hancock)	Glasper; Cordae Amari Dunston; Bilal Oliver; Herbert Hancock; Dave; Hodge	3:44
4.	"Let Me In" (featuring Mick Jenkins)	Glasper; Jayson Jenkins; Dave; Hodge	4:39
5.	"In Case You Forgot"	Glasper	1:41
6.	"Indulging in Such"	Glasper	4:03
7.	"Fuck Yo Feelings" (featuring Yebba)	Glasper; Abigaile Smith; Dave; Hodge; Sir Darryl Farris	2:30
8.	"Endangered Black Woman" (featuring Andra Day and Staceyann Chin)	Glasper; Cassandra Monique Batie; Staceyann Chin; Dave; Hodge; Muhammad Ayers	3:45
9.	"Expectations" (featuring Baby Rose, Rapsody and James Poyser)	Glasper; Baby Rose; Marlanna Evans; Dave; Hodge; Tim Maxwey; Davionne	4:54
10.	"All I Do" (featuring SiR, Bridget Kelly and Song Bird)	Glasper; Farris; Bridget Kelly; Theresa Wilson; Dave; Hodge	6:53
11.	"Aah Whoa" (featuring Muhsinah and Queen Sheba)	Glasper; Muhsinah Abdul-Karim; Queen Sheba; Dave; Hodge	2:54
12.	"I Want You"	Glasper; Farris	2:47
13.	"Trade in Bars Yo" (featuring Herbie Hancock)	Glasper; Hancock; Dave; Hodge	1:42
14.	"DAF Fall Out"	Glasper; Dave; Hodge	2:01
15.	"Sunshine"	Glasper; Dave; Hodge; Dunston	1:52
16.	"Liquid Swords"	Glasper; Dave; Hodge	4:37
17.	"DAF FTF"	Glasper; Dave; Hodge	4:32
18.	"Treal" (featuring Yasiin Bey)	Glasper; Dante Smith; Dave; Hodge	7:27
19.	"Cold"	Glasper; Curtis Jews	2:00
Total length:			1:11:13

== Charts ==
Chart performance for Fuck Yo Feelings
Chart (2019)	Peak position
US Top Jazz Albums (Billboard)	6
