= Shelli Boone =

American actress

- Born: United States
- Occupation: Actress
- Years active: 2004–present
- Website: https://shelliboone.com/

Shelli Boone is an American actress most known for portraying Evan Reed in Saints & Sinners. Her other work includes the films Holla, Crossover, Tied Up, Out the Gate and Murder in Mexico: The Bruce Beresford-Redman Story, and the sitcom How I Met Your Mother. She also appeared in an episode of Grey's Anatomy.

Boone is the Artistic Director of the Willie Agee Playhouse in Inglewood, California.

== Filmography ==
=== Film ===
Year	Title	Role	Notes
2004	Tied Up	Ria	
2004	Tha' Crib	Peaches	
2006	Crossover	Shelli	
2006	Holla	Monica	
2007	A New Tomorrow	Female Whitehead Campaigner	
2008	Voyeur: In Hindsight	Shelli Boone	
2008	Remembering Phil	CCA Receptionist	
2008	Auto Recovery	Andres	
2009	He Who Finds a Wife	Lauren Alexander	
2009	See Dick Run	Joanna	
2010	The Company We Keep	Nicole	
2010	Where's Henry	Melissa	
2010	Something Like a Business	Starlight	
2011	Out the Gate	Tamika	
2011	He Who Finds a Wife 2: Thou Shall Not Covet	Lauren Alexander	
2012	House Arrest	Keisha	
2013	Holla II	Veronica	
2014	Battered	Detective Yale	
2020	Reality Queen!	Rochelle Ritzy	
2022	Grimcutty	Principal	
2022	A Miracle Before Christmas	Sandra	
2023	Lethal Legacy	Victoria	

=== Television ===
Year	Title	Role	Notes
2006	Entourage	Assistant	Episode: "I Wanna Be Sedated"
2007	Drake & Josh	Lady Cop #2	Episode: "Helicopter"
2007	Saints & Sinners	Evan Reed	49 episodes
2009	Southland	Girl #2	Episode: "See the Woman"
2009	House	Molly	Episode: "Under My Skin"
2009	Hot Sluts	Tawny	4 episodes
2010	Tyler Perry's House of Payne	Carol	Episode: "Thug Life"
2011	Grey's Anatomy	Paula Glass	Episode: "P.Y.T. (Pretty Young Thing)"
2011	Hot in Cleveland	Lori	Episode: "Indecent Proposals"
2011	How I Met Your Mother	Bridesmaid	Episode: "The Best Man"
2012	Private Practice	Bridget	Episode: "Losing Battles"
2012	Castle	Chantal	Episode: "A Dance With Death"
2012	Mr. Box Office	Robin	Episode: "Super Fan"
2013–2014	Sistah Did What?	Alex	5 episodes
2015	Murder in Mexico	Sonya	Television film
2017	Highland Park	Sherie	Episode: "Pilot"
2018	Dear White People	Cupcake	Episode: "Volume 2: Chapter V"
2019	Friends and More	Monifa Josephs	2 episodes
2019	Baker's Boys	Bresha	Television film
2020	Psycho Escort	Betty	Television film
2020	NCIS: Los Angeles	Claudia Lazzez	Episode: "Cash Flow"
2021	I Think You Should Leave with Tim Robinson	Liz	Episode: "They said that to me at a dinner."
2021	All American	Tina Hicks	2 episodes
2021	Why Women Kill	Rona	4 episodes
2021	S.W.A.T.	Carolyn	Episode: "West Coast Offense"
2021–2022	No Other Way	Various roles	3 episodes
2022	The Rookie	Olivia Terry	Episode: "Take Back"
2022–2023	All American: Homecoming	Tina Hicks	4 episodes
2023	CSI: Vegas	Mimi Khan	Episode: "When the Dust Settles"
