= Chris Rob =

American singer

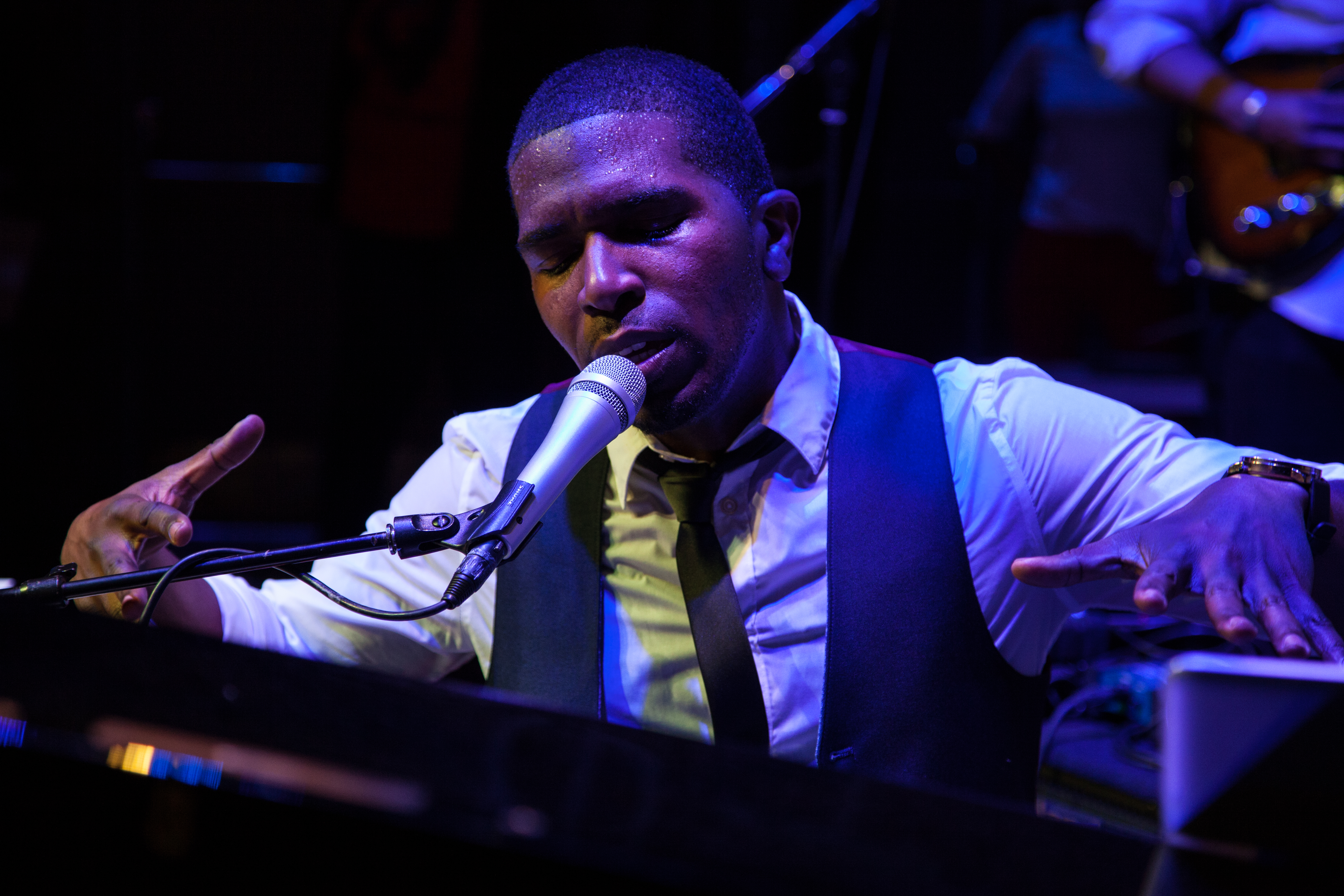
- The Brooklyn Academy of Music, April 2014

Background information
- Born: Christopher Robinson; Chicago, Illinois, U.S.
- Genres: Hip hop; R&B; soul; funk
- Occupations: Singer; songwriter; producer
- Instruments: Vocals; piano; keyboards
- Years active: 2002–present
- Website: chrisrobmusic.com

Christopher Robinson, known as Chris Rob, is an American musician, originally from Chicago, who currently resides in Brooklyn, New York. Rob, the younger brother of actor-comedian Craig Robinson, attended Roosevelt University in Chicago and earned a degree in music.

== Early life ==
Rob was born and raised in the South Side of Chicago. Through the early influence of his mother, a classical concert pianist and musical educator, Rob developed into a multi-instrumentalist playing the piano, electric piano, organ, drums, guitar, and bass guitar. Rob credits his mother, older brother Craig Robinson, and artists such as, Herbie Hancock, Nina Simone, Daryl Coley, Steely Dan, and DJ Premier as significant influences of his musical framework.

== Career ==
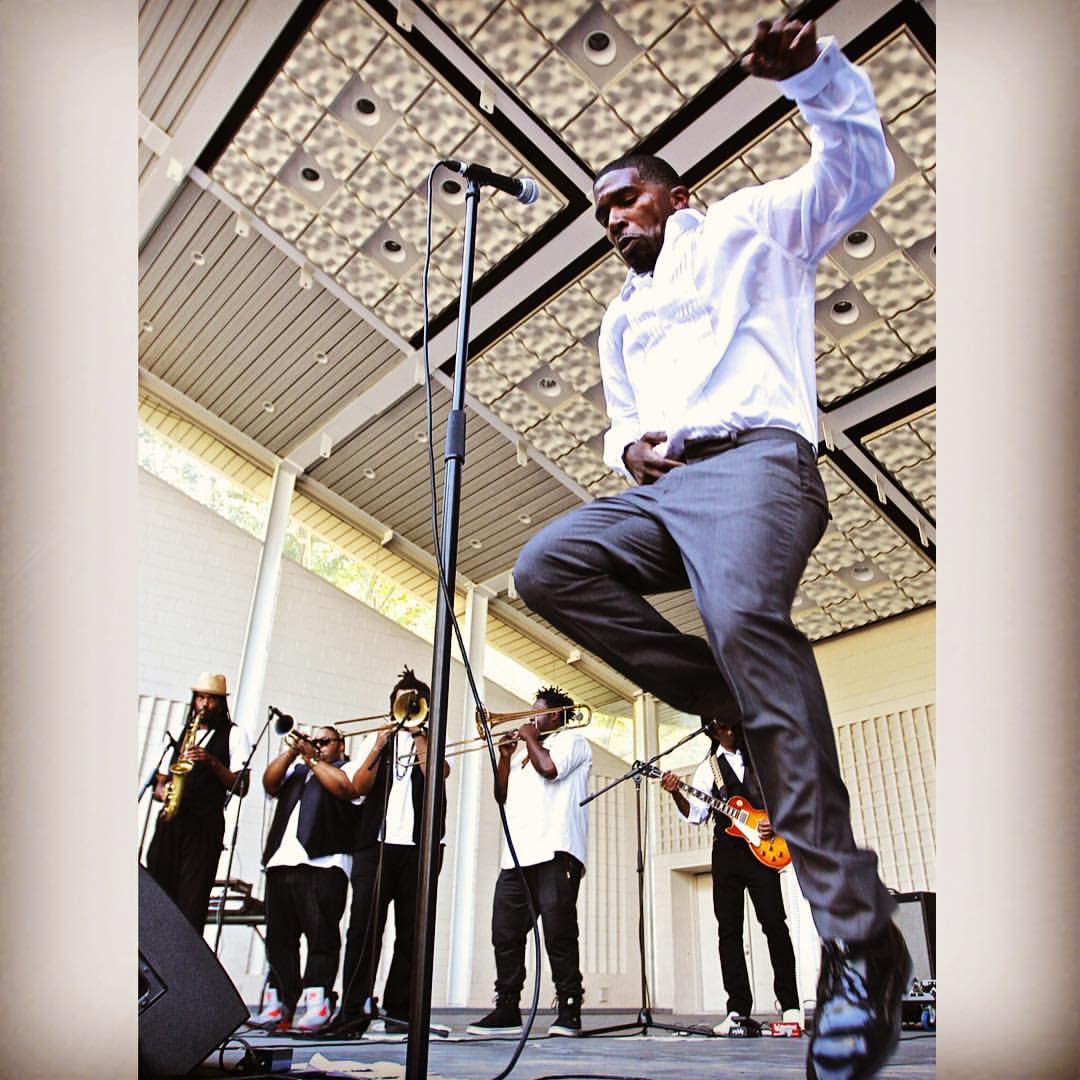
Chris Rob performing in Harlem, NY in August 2015

Rob performed as the opening act at a pre-Grammy brunch sponsored by attorney Londell McMillan and the Artist Empowerment Coalition; and was also featured on both the ASCAP and BMI showcases in lower Manhattan.{{unreliable source?]}} While on tour as the keyboardist and backup vocalist, he also took on the position of musical director for John Legend's 'Get Lifted' Tour.

Chris Rob also performed with Stevie Wonder in Washington D.C. for President Barack Obama's inauguration festivities. In addition to his own solo shows, Rob directs the stage for classic hip hop artists including Pete Rock & CL Smooth, Black Moon, Talib Kweli, and The Real Live Show. He collaborates heavily with producers like DJ Spinna and Devo Springsteen. Rob toured with Atlantic Records' artist Laura Izibor as well as his own older brother, actor/comedian Craig Robinson (NBC's "The Office").

He has also opened for or played with Prince & the New Power Generation, Elton John, Snoop Dogg, John Mayer, Ashford & Simpson, Jill Scott, The Roots, The Black Eyed Peas, Alicia Keys, Barry Manilow, Roberta Flack, Common, Meshell Ndegeocello, Cee-Lo Green, Anthony Hamilton, and Patti Austin.

His television appearances include The Grammy Awards, "Oprah", "The Tonight Show with Jay Leno", "The Office", "Late Night with Conan O'Brien", "The Ellen DeGeneres Show", "Jimmy Kimmel Live!", The Soul Train Awards, "Entertainment Tonight", "Raymond is Laat" (Amsterdam), "Top of the Pops" (Amsterdam, London), and Jools Holland (London). Rob has released four studio albums and his latest single No Doubt was released in June 2018.

== Discography ==
List of Rob's solo studio albums with complete track listings
Title	Album Details
The Official Bootleg of Chris Rob Vol. 1	Release Year: 2003; Track List: 1. Prelude; 2. Said You'd Never Leave Me; 3. Make Love Tonight; 4. Dance With Me; 5. Tell 'Em; 6. Jessie Bell; 7. Naima; 8. Said You'd Never Leave Me (Live at S.O.B.'s, New York); 9. Tell 'Em (Live at S.O.B.'s, New York)
The Official Bootleg of Chris Rob Vol. 2	Release Year: 2008; Track List: 1. Codeword featuring Nemiss; 2. Take Time; 3. Creepin (Into My Mind); 4. Ghetto People; 5. Good Girl, Hood Girl); 6. Til We Had Sexxx; 7. Call U 8. Dirty Movie (Live at The Temple Bar, L.A.); 9. U Can't Run (Live at Bowery Poetry Club, N.Y)
Mental Notes	Release Year: 2010; Track List: 1. Not Guilty; 2. Sex.Money. & Drugs; 3. Waiting 4 You; 4. Check Out Dat Body; 5. Take Time; 6. Everyday; 7. 3 AM Sailing
Sound of Da Struggle	Release Year: 2016; Track List: 1. Hold On; 2. She's on the Move; 3. Taking Too Long; 4. The War Inside; 5. For Colored Boys (featuring Talib Kweli & M.O.E Money); 6. Special Lady; 7. Love You Up
