= Mark Colenburg =

American drummer

Mark Colenburg (born in St. Louis, MO), is an American drummer and percussionist.

== Life and career ==
Colenburg started using household objects as drums at the age of 2, and had his first performance at his home church at the age of 6. While in high school, he joined a music ministry under Levi "Too" King and played drums on his first professional recording and played with Willie Akins. Colenburg won the Outstanding Musicianship Award, the All Suburban Jazz Ensemble Drum Chair and the All State Jazz Ensemble Drum Chair in Missouri.

After high school, Colenburg moved to New York to attend the Mannes School of Music at The New School University. His breakout gig in New York was with rapper Common, which led to work with Q-Tip and other hip-hop headliners as well as jazz musicians Cecil McBee, Chico Freeman, Kenny Garrett and Stefon Harris.

In New York, he became exposed to various genres of music. Colenburg has performed with Mos Def, Lauryn Hill, Amel Larrieux, Kurt Rosenwinkel, Lalah Hathaway, and Macy Gray.

In 2011, Colenburg joined the Robert Glasper Experiment, which explores fusions between jazz and hip-hop. In 2016, he served as Producer, Composer, Drummer, and vocalist on Artscience for Robert Glasper Experiment.

Colenburg is a Grammy Award Nominee for "Best R&B Album" for Robert Glasper Experiment, Black Radio II and Grammy Award-winning drummer for "Best Traditional R&B Performance" on "Jesus Children" with Robert Glasper Experiment, Lalah Hathaway, Malcolm-Jamal Warner.

Colenburg plays drums on "Water Games" on the album 2015 REVIVE Music Presents: Supreme Sonacy (Vol. 1), a compilation album produced by REVIVE in partnership with Blue Note Records. In 2016, Colenburg played drums on several tracks for Derrick Hodge's album The Second. The album was released on August 8, 2016. Mark also collaborated with Tribe Called Quest for their release We Got It From Here, Thank You For 4 Your Service.

Colenburg has appeared on various television broadcasts including Conan and The Tonight Show with Jimmy Fallon.
