= Black Radio =

Studio album by Robert Glasper Experiment
- Released: February 28, 2012
- Genres: Jazz; jazz rap; hip-hop; R&B; neo soul
- Length: 65:18
- Label: Blue Note Records
- Producer: Robert Glasper

Robert Glasper chronology
Double-Booked (2009)	Black Radio (2012)	Black Radio 2 (2013)

Professional ratings
Review scores
Source	Rating
AllMusic	5/5 stars
The New Zealand Herald	3/5
Tom Hull – on the Web	B+

Black Radio is an album by Robert Glasper, recorded with his electric quartet, Robert Glasper Experiment. Released on February 28, 2012, on the Blue Note label, the album won Best R&B Album at the 55th Grammy Awards and also received a nomination for Best R&B Performance for the album cut "Gonna Be Alright (F.T.B.)", which featured R&B singer Ledisi, in February 2013.

== Track listing ==
No.	Title	Writer(s)	Producer(s)	Length
1.	"Lift Off / Mic Check" (featuring Shafiq Husayn)	Robert Glasper, S. Husayn	R. Glasper	3:57
2.	"Afro Blue" (featuring Erykah Badu)	Mongo Santamaria, Oscar Brown	R. Glasper	5:13
3.	"Cherish the Day" (featuring Lalah Hathaway)	Sade Adu, Andrew Hale, Stuart Matthewman	R. Glasper	5:53
4.	"Always Shine" (featuring Lupe Fiasco and Bilal)	R. Glasper, W. Jaco	R. Glasper	5:22
5.	"Gonna Be Alright (F.T.B.)" (featuring Ledisi)	R. Glasper, L. Young	R. Glasper	6:13
6.	"Move Love" (featuring KING)	R. Glasper, Paris Strother	R. Glasper	3:22
7.	"Ah Yeah... That's Just Great" (featuring Musiq Soulchild and Chrisette Michele)	R. Glasper, P. Gallitano, Derrick Hodge, T. Johnson, C. M. Payne	R. Glasper, Bryan-Michael Cox	5:13
8.	"The Consequences of Jealousy" (featuring Meshell Ndegeocello)	R. Glasper, M. Ndegeocello	R. Glasper	6:12
9.	"Why Do We Try" (featuring Stokley)	Jeffrey Allen (2)	R. Glasper	6:32
10.	"Black Radio" (featuring Yasiin Bey)	R. Glasper, D. Hodge, Chris E. Dave, D. Smith	R. Glasper	5:26
11.	"Letter to Hermione" (featuring Bilal)	David Bowie	R. Glasper	4:52
12.	"Smells Like Teen Spirit"	Kurt Cobain, Dave Grohl, Krist Novoselic	R. Glasper	7:24
Total length:				65:10

iTunes bonus track
No.	Title	Writer(s)	Producer(s)	Length
13.	"A Love Supreme"	John Coltrane	R. Glasper	5:20

European bonus track
No.	Title	Writer(s)	Producer(s)	Length
13.	"Fever" (featuring Hindi Zahra)	R. Glasper, H. Zahra	R. Glasper, H. Zahra	6:48

Japanese bonus track
No.	Title	Writer(s)	Producer(s)	Length
13.	"Twice"	Little Dragon	R. Glasper	5:26

Notes

- "Afro Blue" cover as performed by Mongo Santamaria.
- "Cherish the Day" cover as performed by Sade.
- "Gonna Be Alright (F.T.B.)" additional vocals of "F.T.B." from album In My Element as performed by Robert Glasper.
- "Letter to Hermione" cover as performed by David Bowie.
- "Smells Like Teen Spirit" cover as performed by Nirvana.
- "A Love Supreme" cover as performed by John Coltrane.
- "Twice" cover as performed by Little Dragon.

== Black Radio Recovered: The Remix EP ==
No.	Title	Writer(s)	Producer(s)	Length
1.	"Afro Blue (9th Wonder's Blue Light Basement Remix)" (featuring Erykah Badu and Phonte)	M. Santamaria, P. Coleman	R. Glasper, 9th Wonder (signifies a remixer)	5:07
2.	"Black Radio (Pete Rock Remix)" (featuring Yasiin Bey)	R. Glasper, D. Hodge, Chris E. Dave, D. Smith	R. Glasper, Pete Rock (signifies a remixer)	4:51
3.	"The Consequences of Jealousy (Georgia Anne Muldrow Sassy Geemix)" (featuring Meshell Ndegeocello)	R. Glasper, M. Ndegeocello	R. Glasper, Georgia Anne Muldrow (signifies a remixer)	4:37
4.	"Twice (?uestlove's Twice Baked Remix)" (featuring Solange Knowles and The Roots)	R. Glasper, S. Knowles	R. Glasper, ?uestlove (signifies a remixer)	9:22
5.	"Letter to Hermione (Robert Glasper and Jewels Remix)" (featuring Bilal and Black Milk)	D. Bowie, C. Cross	R. Glasper, DJ Jewels Baby (signifies a remixer)	4:14
6.	"Dillalude #2"	R. Glasper	R. Glasper	9:10
Total length:				37:21

== Personnel ==
The Robert Glasper Experiment

- Robert Glasper — Keyboards, Piano, Fender Rhodes (Exc. tracks 10, 11), synthesizer (track 10), arrangements (tracks 2, 11, 12)
- Casey Benjamin — Vocoder (tracks 1, 3, 4, 8, 12), flute (tracks 2, 11), saxophone (tracks 3, 6, 9, 10), synthesizer (tracks 3–5, 12), arrangement (track 8)
- Derrick Hodge — Bass
- Chris Dave — Drums, percussion
- Jahi Sundance — Turntables (tracks 1, 8, 10, 12)
- Stokley Williams — Percussion (track 9)

Featured Artists

- Shafiq Husayn — Vocals (track 1)
- Erykah Badu — Vocals (track 2, Remix EP track 1)
- Lalah Hathaway — Vocals (track 3, 12)
- Bilal — Vocals (track 4, 11, Remix EP track 5)
- Lupe Fiasco — Vocals (track 4)
- Ledisi — Vocals (track 5)
- KING (track 6)
  - Anita Bias — Vocals
  - Amber Strother — Vocals
  - Paris Strother — Keyboards
- Chrisette Michele — Vocals (track 7)
- Musiq Soulchild — Vocals, snapping (track 7)
- MeShell Ndegeocello — Vocals (track 8, Remix EP track 3)
- Stokley Williams — Vocals (track 9), percussion (tracks 9, 12)
- Yasiin Bey — Vocals (track 10, Remix EP track 2)
- Hindi Zahra — Vocals (European bonus tracks)
- Phonte — Vocals (Remix EP track 1)
- Solange Knowles — Vocals (Remix EP track 4)
- The Roots — (Remix EP track 4)
- Black Milk — Vocals (Remix EP track 5)
- 9th Wonder — Remixing (Remix EP track 1)
- Pete Rock — Remixing (Remix EP track 2)
- Georgia Anne Muldrow — Remixing (Remix EP track 3)
- ?uestlove — Remixing (Remix EP track 4)
- DJ Jewels Baby — Remixing (Remix EP track 5)

Production

- Recorded at Threshold, Los Angeles, CA, by Keith Lewis, assisted by Todd Bergman.
- Vocals and piano for "Afro Blue" recorded by Max Ross at Systems Two, Brooklyn, NY.
- Mixed by Qmillion at Flying Dread STudios, Venice, CA.
- Mastering by Chris Athens at Sterling Sound, New York, NY.
- Produced by Robert Glasper, except track 7 co-produced by Bryan-Michael Cox
- Nicole Hegeman — Executive producer, production coordination, management
- Eli Wolf — Executive producer, A&R
- Vincent Bennett — Management
- Gordon H. Jee — Art direction
- Giuliyani — Original artwork on cover
- Michael Schreiber — Photography
- Jewell Green — Photography
- Cognito — Photography
- Angelika Beener — Liner notes

== Charts ==
=== Original charts ===
Chart (2012)	Peak position
French Albums (SNEP)	165
Dutch Albums (Album Top 100)	71
Japanese Albums (Oricon)	54
UK Albums (Official Charts)	81
US Billboard 200	15
US Top R&B/Hip-Hop Albums (Billboard)	4
US Top Jazz Albums (Billboard)	1

=== Remix charts ===
Chart (2012)	Peak position
US Billboard 200	200
US Top R&B/Hip-Hop Albums (Billboard)	26
US Top Jazz Albums (Billboard)	2

=== Year-end charts ===
Chart (2012)	Position
US Top R&B/Hip-Hop Albums	75
US Top Jazz Albums	8
