= Derrick Hodge =

American musician and composer

- Born: July 5, 1979 (age 47); Philadelphia, Pennsylvania, U.S.
- Genres: Jazz, hip hop soul, urban contemporary
- Occupations: Record producer, bass guitarist
- Instruments: Bass guitar, double bass
- Years active: 2000–present
- Label: Blue Note
- Website: derrickhodge.com

Derrick Hodge (born July 5, 1979) is an American record producer, musical director, bandleader, and bass guitarist. A two-time Grammy Award recipient, Hodge was named a Sundance Composer Fellow and received a Motif Award — one of world's highest honors for Child Advocacy. His bass performance on Common's album Be has been recognized as one of top 20 basslines in hip-hop.

As a performer, Hodge has founded and played in bands and groups as diverse and as influential as R+R=Now, the Robert Glasper Experiment and The Blue Note All Stars, as a producer he has collaborated with Quincy Jones, Don Was and Common, and as a musical director, he has worked with artists such as Yasiin Bey, Nas, and notably held the position with Maxwell from 2009 to 2019.

== Career ==
Growing up just outside Philadelphia, Hodge's talent was quickly recognized by members of the city's neo soul movement, and while still in college, he became the bass player and musical director for artists including Jill Scott, Maxwell, Floetry, James Posyer and Musiq Soulchild. Simultaneously he was forging a career in jazz circles with other musicians including Terence Blanchard, Donald Byrd, Mulgrew Miller and Bootsie Barnes.

As a Blue Note Recording Artist Hodge has released three critically acclaimed solo projects: Live Today (2013), The Second (2016), and Color Of Noize (2020)

In 2014, Hodge became the first Black composer to compose Hip Hop for the National Symphony Orchestra when he acted as Orchestral Arranger and music director for the iconic event “20th anniversary celebration of Illmatic which saw Nas perform the album with the National Symphony Orchestra, conducted by Steven Reineke. The event - which was named by FENDER as one of the top moments in Hip Hop history - was also the first time Hip Hop was ever performed by the National Symphony Orchestra and at the Kennedy Center.

=== Later career (2011–present) ===
Hodge was signed to Blue Note Records after meeting record producer and Blue Note president Don Was in September 2011. On August 6, 2013, his solo album, Live Today, was released with guest appearances by Common ("Live Today"), vocalist Alan Hampton ("Holding Onto You"), Robert Glasper ("Live Today"), Chris Dave, Mark Colenburg, Travis Sayles, Keyon Harrold, and Aaron Parks. He has also worked with Floetry, Osvaldo Golijov, Anthony Hamilton, Gerald Levert, Donnie McClurkin, James Moore, Mos Def, Musiq Soulchild, Q-Tip, Jill Scott, Timbaland, and Kanye West. He has toured and recorded with Clark Terry, Mulgrew Miller, Terell Stafford, and Terence Blanchard.

He appeared on Flow and A Tale of God's Will (A Requiem for Katrina) (2007), which were nominated for four Grammy Awards, winning one for Best Large Jazz Ensemble Album. He also appeared on rapper Common's albums Be and Finding Forever, which won a Grammy Award. Hodge was musical director for R&B singer Maxwell from 2009 to 2013, and was featured as bassist on Maxwell's BLACKsummers'night, which peaked at No. 1 on the Billboard 200 and Billboard Top R&B/Hip-Hop Albums as well as winning a Grammy Award for Best R&B Album in 2010. Hodge won a Grammy Award for Best R&B Album in 2013 with the Robert Glasper Experiment for Black Radio and in 2023 with Black Radio 3.

Hodge was a contributing composer for the musical score of When the Levees Broke: A Requiem in Four Acts, an HBO documentary produced by Spike Lee, aired in August 2006, as well as choral arranger for the ending credits of Miracle at St. Anna also directed by Lee. He was sole composer of the score for the documentary film Faubourg Treme: The Untold Story of Black New Orleans directed by Dawn Logsdon, written by Lolis Eric Elie and released in 2008. Other film credits include music composer for The Recruiter directed by Edet Belzberg, The Black Candle directed by M. K. Asante Jr., as well as scores for director and playwright David E. Talbert. "Infinite Reflections" was commissioned by the Chicago Symphony Orchestra and arranged for small brass ensemble

== Discography ==
=== As leader ===
- Live Today (Blue Note, 2013)
- The Second (Blue Note, 2016)
- Color of Noize (Blue Note, 2020)

=== As group ===
Blue Note All Stars

- Our Point of View (Blue Note, 2017)[2CD]

=== As sideman ===
With Bilal

- Airtight's Revenge (Plug, 2010) – recorded in 2008–10
- A Love Surreal (eOne, 2013)

With Terence Blanchard

- Flow (Blue Note, 2005)
- Inside Man (Varese Sarabande, 2006)
- A Tale of God's Will (A Requiem for Katrina) (Blue Note, 2007)
- Choices (Concord Jazz, 2009)

With Common

- Be (Geffen, 2005)
- Finding Forever (Geffen, 2007)
- Go! Common Classics (Geffen, 2010)
- The Dreamer/The Believer (Warner Bros., 2011)
- Nobody's Smiling (Def Jam, 2014)

With Robert Glasper

- Double-Booked (Blue Note, 2009)
- Black Radio (Blue Note, 2011)
- Black Radio 2 (Blue Note, 2013)
- ArtScience (Blue Note, 2016)
- Fuck Yo Feelings (Loma Vista, 2020)

With Kenny Lattimore

- Weekend (Arista, 2001)
- Uncovered/Covered (Verity, 2006)

With Maxwell Rivera

- BLACKsummers'night (Columbia, 2009)
- blackSUMMERS'night (Columbia, 2016)
- Pretty Wings (Columbia, 2009)

With Mulgrew Miller

- Live at Yoshi's Volume One (MAXJAZZ, 2004)
- Live at Yoshi's Volume Two (MAXJAZZ, 2005)
- Live at the Kennedy Center Volume One (MAXJAZZ, 2006)
- Live at the Kennedy Center Volume Two (MAXJAZZ, 2007)

With Gretchen Parlato

- In a Dream (ObliqSound, 2009)
- The Lost and Found (ObliqSound, 2011)

With others

- Philip Bailey, Love Will Find a Way (Verve, 2019)
- Terri Lyne Carrington, Waiting Game (Motéma, 2019)
- Freddy Cole, This Love of Mine (HighNote, 2005)
- Brian Culbertson, A Soulful Christmas (GRP, 2006)
- Floetry, Floetic (DreamWorks, 2002)
- Vivian Green, A Love Story (Columbia, 2002)
- Anthony Hamilton, Comin' from Where I'm From (Arista, 2003)
- Stefon Harris, African Tarantella: Dances with Duke (Blue Note, 2006)
- Gerald Levert, The G Spot (Elektra, 2002)
- Lionel Loueke, Heritage (Blue Note, 2012)
- Q-Tip, The Renaissance (Universal Motown, 2008) – recorded in 2003–08
- Karriem Riggins, Headnod Suite (Stones Throw, 2017)
- Kendrick Scott, Reverence (Criss Cross, 2010) – recorded in 2008
- Terell Stafford, New Beginnings (MAXJAZZ, 2003)
- Helen Sung, Helenistique (Fresh Sound, 2006) – recorded in 2005
- Clark Terry, Live at Marihans (Chiaroscuro, 2005)[2CD] – live recorded in 2004
